= 2003–04 NK Dinamo Zagreb season =

Dinamo Zagreb
2003–04 season
- President: Mirko Barišić
- Manager: Nikola Jurčević
- 1. HNL: 2nd
- Croatian Cup: Winners (7th title)
- UEFA Champions League: Third qualifying round
- UEFA Cup: Second round
- Top goalscorer: Dario Zahora (16)

This article shows statistics of individual players for the football club Dinamo Zagreb It also lists all matches that Dinamo Zagreb played in the 2003–04 season.

== Squad ==
(Correct as of November 2003)

Note: Flags indicate national team as defined under FIFA eligibility rules; some limited exceptions apply. Players may hold more than one non-FIFA nationality.

No.	Pos.	Nation	Player
1	GK	CRO	Ivan Turina
2	DF	CRO	Stipe Lapić
4	DF	MKD	Goce Sedloski
5	DF	CRO	Andre Mijatović
6	DF	SVN	Boštjan Cesar
7	MF	CRO	Hrvoje Štrok
8	MF	CRO	Jasmin Agić
10	MF	BIH	Edin Mujčin
11	FW	CRO	Dario Zahora
12	GK	CRO	Marko Šarlija
13	DF	CRO	Ivan Ćosić
14	MF	CRO	Mihael Mikić
16	MF	CRO	Dalibor Poldrugač

No.	Pos.	Nation	Player
17	DF	CRO	Damir Krznar
18	DF	CMR	Patrice Kwedi
19	MF	CRO	Niko Kranjčar (captain)
20	FW	ROU	Dumitru Mitu
21	FW	BIH	Enes Mešanović
22	MF	CRO	Ante Tomić
23	MF	BIH	Mladen Bartolović
24	FW	CRO	Eduardo
25	MF	BIH	Mario Jurić
26	DF	CRO	Dino Drpić
29	MF	CRO	Drago Papa
30	GK	CRO	Mario Jozić

== Transfers ==
=== Summer ===
Incoming

Date	Pos	Player	From	Fee
July 2003	FW	(Belgium) Branko Strupar	(England) Derby County	Free transfer
July 2003	DF	(Croatia) Andre Mijatović	(Croatia) Rijeka	Free transfer
July 2003	MF	(Bosnia and Herzegovina) Albin Pelak	(Japan) Cerezo Osaka	Undisclosed
July 2003	DF	(Croatia) Stipe Lapić	(Netherlands) PSV Eindhoven	Undisclosed
July 2003	FW	(Bosnia and Herzegovina) Mladen Bartolović	(Croatia) Cibalia	Undisclosed
July 2003	MF	(Croatia) Hrvoje Štrok	(Croatia) NK Zagreb	Undisclosed

Outgoing

Date	Pos	Player	To	Fee
July 2003	MF	(Croatia) Luka Modrić	(Bosnia and Herzegovina) Zrinjski Mostar	Loan

== Competitions ==
=== Overall ===
Competition	Started round	Final position / round	First match	Last Match
2003 Croatian Supercup	—	Winners	17 Jul 2003	
2003–04 Prva HNL	—	Runners-up	26 Jul 2003	15 May 2004
2003–04 Croatian Cup	First round	Winners	17 Sep 2003	19 May 2004
2003–04 UEFA Champions League	Second qualifying round	Third qualifying round	30 Jul 2003	27 Aug 2003
2003–04 UEFA Cup	First round	Second round	24 Sep 2003	27 Nov 2003

=== Prva HNL ===
==== Classification ====
Pos	Team	Pld	W	D	L	GF	GA	GD	Pts	Qualification
1	Hajduk Split (C)	32	25	3	4	63	24	+39	78	Qualification to Champions League second qualifying round
2	Dinamo Zagreb	32	23	7	2	77	25	+52	76	Qualification to UEFA Cup second qualifying round
3	Rijeka	32	11	9	12	36	41	−5	42	Qualification to UEFA Cup second qualifying round
4	Osijek	32	11	6	15	50	57	−7	39	
5	Varteks	32	9	11	12	33	42	−9	38	
6	Zadar	32	7	11	14	46	71	−25	32	

Source: RSSSF.org
Rules for classification: 1) points; 2) goal difference; 3) number of goals scored.
(C) Champions

==== Results summary ====
Overall								Home						Away					
Pld	W	D	L	GF	GA	GD	Pts	W	D	L	GF	GA	GD	W	D	L	GF	GA	GD
32	23	7	2	77	25	+52	76	14	2	0	52	9	+43	9	5	2	25	16	+9

==== Results by round ====
Round	1	2	3	4	5	6	7	8	9	10	11	12	13	14	15	16	17	18	19	20	21	22	23	24	25	26	27	28	29	30	31	32
Ground	H	H	A	H	A	H	A	H	A	H	A	A	A	H	A	H	A	H	A	H	A	H	H	A	H	H	A	A	H	A	A	H
Result	W	W	D	W	W	W	W	D	D	W	W	D	W	W	L	W	L	D	W	W	W	W	W	D	W	W	W	W	W	D	W	W
Position																																

Source: Competitive matches
A = Away; H = Home; W = Win; D = Draw; L = Loss

==== Results by opponent ====
Team	1–22		23–32		Points
Team	Home	Away	Home	Away	Points
Cibalia	3–2	1–0	—	—	6
Hajduk Split	1–0	1–3	3–1	0–0	7
Inter Zaprešić	1–0	1–1	—	—	4
Kamen Ingrad	1–1	1–0	—	—	4
Marsonia	7–0	3–1	—	—	6
Osijek	4–0	2–3	4–1	3–2	9
Rijeka	2–0	0–0	5–0	1–0	10
Slaven Belupo	4–0	1–0	—	—	6
Varteks	3–0	2–0	4–1	4–3	12
Zadar	4–2	2–2	5–0	1–1	8
NK Zagreb	1–1	2–0	—	—	4

Source: 2003–04 Prva HNL article

== Matches ==
=== Competitive ===
M	Date	Tournament	Round	Ground	Opponent	Score	Attendance	Dinamo scorers	Report
01	20 Jul	Croatian Supercup	N/A	H	Hajduk Split	4–1	7,000	Tomić, Sedloski, Eduardo, Zahora	Report
02	26 Jul	1. HNL	1	H	Zadar	4–2			
03	30 Jul	Champions League	QR2	A (Slovenia)	Maribor (Slovenia)	1–1		Kranjčar	
04	2 Aug	1. HNL	2	H	Marsonia	7–0			
05	6 Aug	Champions League	QR2	H	Maribor (Slovenia)	2–1		Mijatović, Drpić	
06	12 Aug	Champions League	QR3	A (Ukraine)	Dynamo Kyiv (Ukraine)	1–3		Kranjčar	uefa.com
07	16 Aug	1. HNL	4	H	Osijek	4–0			
08	23 Aug	1. HNL	5	A	Slaven Belupo	1–0			
09	27 Aug	Champions League	QR3	H	Dynamo Kyiv (Ukraine)	0–2			uefa.com
10	31 Aug	1. HNL	6	H	Hajduk Split	1–0			
11	3 Sep	1. HNL	3*	A	Rijeka	0–0			
12	13 Sep	1. HNL	7	A	NK Zagreb	2–0			
13	17 Sep	Croatian Cup	First round	A	Lučko	3–0			
14	20 Sep	1. HNL	8	H	Kamen Ingrad	1–1			
15	24 Sep	UEFA Cup	R1	H	MTK (Hungary)	3–1		Eduardo, Agić, Sedloski	uefa.com
16	27 Sep	1. HNL	9	A	Inker Zaprešić	1–1			
17	4 Oct	1. HNL	10	H	Cibalia	3–2			
18	15 Oct	UEFA Cup	R1	A (Hungary)	MTK (Hungary)	0–0			uefa.com
19	18 Oct	1. HNL	11	A	Varteks	2–0			
20	25 Oct	1. HNL	12	A	Zadar	2–2		Sedloski, Kranjčar	Report
21	29 Oct	Croatian Cup	Round of 16	A	Bjelovar	4–1			
22	2 Nov	1. HNL	13	A	Marsonia	3–1			
23	6 Nov	UEFA Cup	R2	H	Dnipro (Ukraine)	0–2			uefa.com
24	9 Nov	1. HNL	14	H	Rijeka	2–0			
25	23 Nov	1. HNL	15	A	Osijek	2–3			
26	27 Nov	UEFA Cup	R2	A (Ukraine)	Dnipro (Ukraine)	1–1		Sedloski	uefa.com
27	1 Dec	1. HNL	16	H	Slaven Belupo	4–0			
28	6 Dec	1. HNL	17	A	Hajduk Split	1–3			
29	21 Feb	1. HNL	18	H	NK Zagreb	1–1			
30	28 Feb	1. HNL	19	A	Kamen Ingrad	1–0			
31	6 Mar	1. HNL	20	H	Inker Zaprešić	1–0			
32	13 Mar	1. HNL	21	A	Cibalia	1–0			
33	16 Mar	Croatian Cup	Quarter-final	A	Osijek	2–0			
34	20 Mar	1. HNL	22	H	Varteks	3–0			
35	23 Mar	Croatian Cup	Quarter-final	H	Osijek	3–1			
36	27 Mar	1. HNL	23	H	Varteks	4–1			
37	3 Apr	1. HNL	24	A	Hajduk Split	0–0			
38	7 Apr	Croatian Cup	Semi-final	H	Rijeka	4–2			
39	10 Apr	1. HNL	25	H	Zadar	5–0			
40	14 Apr	Croatian Cup	Semi-final	A	Rijeka	0–1			
41	17 Apr	1. HNL	26	H	Rijeka	5–0			
42	21 Apr	1. HNL	27	A	Osijek	3–2			
43	24 Apr	1. HNL	28	A	Varteks	4–3			
44	1 May	1. HNL	29	H	Hajduk Split	3–1			
45	5 May	Croatian Cup	Final	A	Varteks	1–1		Sedloski	
46	8 May	1. HNL	30	A	Zadar	1–1			
47	12 May	1. HNL	31	A	Rijeka	1–0			
48	15 May	1. HNL	32	H	Osijek	4–1			
49	19 May	Croatian Cup	Final	H	Varteks	0–0			
