= 2001–02 NK Dinamo Zagreb season =

Dinamo Zagreb
2001–02 season
- President: Mirko Barišić
- Manager: Ilija Lončarević (until 13 April 2002); Marijan Vlak (caretaker) (from 14 April)
- 1. HNL: 3rd place
- Croatian Cup: Winners (6th title)
- UEFA Cup: First round
- Top goalscorer: Dario Zahora (14)

This article shows statistics of individual players for the football club Dinamo Zagreb It also lists all matches that Dinamo Zagreb played in the 2001–02 season.

== Players ==
=== Squad ===
(Correct as of September 2001)

Note: Flags indicate national team as defined under FIFA eligibility rules; some limited exceptions apply. Players may hold more than one non-FIFA nationality.

No.	Pos.	Nation	Player
1	GK	CRO	Tomislav Butina
2	DF	CRO	Dario Smoje
3	DF	CRO	Ivan Landeka
4	DF	MKD	Goce Sedloski
5	DF	CRO	Kristijan Polovanec
6	DF	SVN	Boštjan Cesar
7	MF	CRO	Mihael Mikić
8	MF	CRO	Jasmin Agić
9	FW	CRO	Domagoj Abramović
11	FW	CRO	Dario Zahora
12	GK	CRO	Ivan Turina

No.	Pos.	Nation	Player
13	DF	CRO	Boris Leutar
14	MF	BIH	Mario Jurić
16	MF	CRO	Jerko Leko
17	MF	CRO	Mislav Bradvić
18	FW	CRO	Vladimir Petrović
19	MF	CRO	Niko Kranjčar
21	MF	CRO	Mario Čutura
25	FW	CRO	Tomislav Gondžić
26	DF	CRO	Dino Drpić
27	MF	CRO	Renato Pilipović

=== Goalscorers ===
Rank	Player	League	Cup	Europe	Total
1	(Croatia) Dario Zahora	14			20
2	(Croatia) Silvio Marić	5			17
2	(Croatia) Vladimir Petrović	5			15
4	(Croatia) Jerko Leko	4			15
5	(Croatia) Igor Cvitanović	3			14
5	(Croatia) Dario Smoje	3			9
5	(Croatia) Renato Pilipović	3		1	6
5	(North Macedonia) Goce Sedloski	3		1	5
5	(Croatia) Mihael Mikić	3			4
10	(Bosnia and Herzegovina) Enes Mešanović	2			3
10	(Croatia) Niko Kranjčar	2			2
10	(Croatia) Jasmin Agić	2		2	2
13	(Croatia) Boško Balaban	1			2
13	(Croatia) Ivan Landeka	1			2
13	(Croatia) Domagoj Abramović	1			1
13	(Croatia) Ante Tomić	1			1
13	(Bosnia and Herzegovina) Mario Jurić	1			1
13	(Croatia) Tomislav Gondžić	1		1	1

== Competitions ==
=== Overall ===
Competition	Started round	Final position / round	First match	Last Match
2001–02 Prva HNL	–	Third place	28 Jul 2001	4 May 2002
2001–02 Croatian Cup	First round	Winners	7 Oct 2001	1 May 2002
2001–02 UEFA Cup	Qualifying round	First round	9 Aug 2001	25 Sep 2001

=== Prva HNL ===
==== Classification ====
Pos	Team	Pld	W	D	L	GF	GA	GD	Pts	Qualification or relegation
1	NK Zagreb (C)	30	20	7	3	71	24	+47	67	Qualification to Champions League second qualifying round
2	Hajduk Split	30	20	5	5	61	28	+33	65	Qualification to UEFA Cup qualifying round
3	Dinamo Zagreb	30	18	5	7	58	30	+28	59	Qualification to UEFA Cup first round
4	Varteks	30	17	6	7	58	40	+18	57	Qualification to UEFA Cup qualifying round
5	Rijeka	30	15	6	9	46	37	+9	51	Qualification to Intertoto Cup first round

Source: RSSSF.org
Rules for classification: 1) points; 2) goal difference; 3) number of goals scored.
(C) Champions

==== Results summary ====
Overall								Home						Away					
Pld	W	D	L	GF	GA	GD	Pts	W	D	L	GF	GA	GD	W	D	L	GF	GA	GD
30	18	5	7	58	30	+28	59	11	2	2	38	15	+23	7	3	5	20	15	+5

==== Results by round ====
Round	1	2	3	4	5	6	7	8	9	10	11	12	13	14	15	16	17	18	19	20	21	22	23	24	25	26	27	28	29	30
Ground	A	H	A	H	A	A	H	A	H	A	H	A	H	A	H	H	A	H	A	H	H	A	H	A	H	A	H	A	H	A
Result	W	D	W	W	W	W	W	L	W	D	L	L	D	L	W	W	W	W	D	W	W	W	W	D	W	L	L	L	W	W
Position																														

Source: Competitive matches
A = Away; H = Home; W = Win; D = Draw; L = Loss

==== Results by opponent ====
Team	Results		Points
Team	Home	Away	Points
Cibalia	2–1	2–1	6
Čakovec	1–0	2–0	6
Hajduk Split	1–2	1–2	0
Hrvatski Dragovoljac	2–1	1–1	4
Kamen Ingrad	4–0	0–1	3
Marsonia	3–1	2–1	6
Osijek	2–1	3–0	6
Pomorac Kostrena	4–0	2–1	6
Rijeka	2–3	0–1	0
Slaven Belupo	4–1	0–0	4
Šibenik	2–0	0–0	4
TŠK Topolovac	3–2	4–2	6
Varteks	5–0	0–2	3
Zadar	0–0	2–1	4
NK Zagreb	3–3	1–2	1

Source: 2001–02 Prva HNL article

== Matches ==
=== Competitive ===
M	Date	Tournament	Round	Ground	Opponent	Score	Attendance	Dinamo scorers	Report
01	28 Jul	1. HNL	1	AR	TŠK Topolovac	4–2	6,000	Zahora (2), Kranjčar, Balaban	Report
02	4 Aug	1. HNL	2	H	Zadar	0–0	8,000		Report
03	9 Aug	UEFA Cup	QR	H	Flora Tallinn (Estonia)	1–0	10,000	Gondžić	uefa.com
04	12 Aug	1. HNL	3	A	Cibalia	2–1	4,000	Zahora, Pilipović	Report
05	18 Aug	1. HNL	4	H	Šibenik	2–0			
06	23 Aug	UEFA Cup	QR	A (Estonia)	Flora Tallinn (Estonia)	1–0		Pilipović	uefa.com
07	26 Aug	1. HNL	5	A	Pomorac Kostrena	2–1			
08	7 Sep	1. HNL	6	A	Osijek	–			
09	15 Sep	1. HNL	7	H	Čakovec	1–0			
10	20 Sep	UEFA Cup	R1	H	Maccabi Tel Aviv (Israel)	2–2		Agić, Sedloski	uefa.com
11	25 Sep	UEFA Cup	R1	A (Israel)	Maccabi Tel Aviv (Israel)	1–1		Agić	uefa.com
12	29 Sep	1. HNL	9	H	Hrvatski Dragovoljac	2–1			
13	7 Oct	Croatian Cup	First round	A	Željezničar Slavonski Brod	3–0			
14	10 Oct	1. HNL	10	A	Slaven Belupo	0–0			
15	14 Oct	1. HNL	11	H	Hajduk Split	1–2			
16	17 Oct	1. HNL	8*	A	Kamen Ingrad	0–1			
17	21 Oct	1. HNL	12	A	Rijeka	0–1			
18	24 Oct	Croatian Cup	Round of 16	A	Kamen Ingrad	4–1			
19	28 Oct	1. HNL	13	H	NK Zagreb	3–3			
20	4 Nov	1. HNL	14	A	Varteks	0–2			
21	17 Nov	1. HNL	15	H	Marsonia	3–1			
22	21 Nov	Croatian Cup	Quarter-final	H	Rijeka	1–0			
23	24 Nov	1. HNL	16	H	TŠK Topolovac	3–2			
24	28 Nov	1. HNL	17	A	Zadar	2–1			
25	2 Dec	1. HNL	18	H	Cibalia	2–1			
26	7 Dec	Croatian Cup	Quarter-final	A	Rijeka	1–0			
27	23 Feb	1. HNL	19	A	Šibenik	0–0			
28	2 Mar	1. HNL	20	H	Pomorac Kostrena	4–0			
29	6 Mar	1. HNL	21	H	Osijek	2–1			
30	9 Mar	1. HNL	22	A	Čakovec	2–0			
31	16 Mar	1. HNL	23	H	Kamen Ingrad	4–0			
32	20 Mar	Croatian Cup	Semi-final	A	Osijek	1–2		Smoje	
33	23 Mar	1. HNL	24	A	Hrvatski Dragovoljac	1–1			
34	30 Mar	1. HNL	25	H	Slaven Belupo	4–1			
35	3 Apr	Croatian Cup	Semi-final	H	Osijek	2–0		Mešanović, Agić	
36	7 Apr	1. HNL	26	A	Hajduk Split	1–2	20,000	Zahora	Report
37	14 Apr	1. HNL	27	H	Rijeka	2–3			
38	20 Apr	1. HNL	28	A	NK Zagreb	1–2	6,000	J. Leko	Report
39	24 Apr	Croatian Cup	Final	H	Varteks	1–1	5,000	Sedloski	Report
40	27 Apr	1. HNL	29	H	Varteks	5–0			
41	1 May	Croatian Cup	Final	A	Varteks	1–0			
42	4 May	1. HNL	30	A	Marsonia	2–1			

Last updated 4 May 2002
