= 2002 Croatian Football Super Cup =

NK Zagreb	Dinamo Zagreb
2	3
- After extra time
- Date: 21 July 2002
- Venue: Stadion Maksimir, Zagreb
- Man of the Match: Silvio Marić (Dinamo Zagreb)
- Referee: Željko Širić (Osijek)
- Attendance: 10,000

The 2002 Croatian Football Super Cup was the fourth edition of the Croatian Football Super Cup, a football match contested by the winners of the previous season's Croatian First League and Croatian Football Cup competitions. The match was played on 21 July 2002 at Stadion Maksimir in Zagreb between 2001–02 Croatian First League winners NK Zagreb and 2001–02 Croatian Football Cup winners Dinamo Zagreb.

== Match details ==
21 July 2002
20:15 CEST

NK Zagreb	2–3 (a.e.t.)	Dinamo Zagreb
Samardžić 17'; Krpan 30'	Report (in Croatian)	Marić 1'; Zahora 41'; Petrović 92'

Stadion Maksimir, Zagreb
Attendance: 10,000
Referee: Željko Širić (Osijek)

NK ZAGREB:
GK	(Croatia) Tomislav Pelin
DF	(Bosnia and Herzegovina) Predrag Šimić
DF	(Croatia) Damir Milinović
DF	(Croatia) Vedran Ješe
DF	(North Macedonia) Goran Stavrevski
DF	(Croatia) Mario Osibov
MF	(Croatia) Ivan Milas	(substituted off) 75'
MF	(Bosnia and Herzegovina) Emir Spahić
FW	(Bosnia and Herzegovina) Admir Hasančić	(substituted off) 55'
FW	(Croatia) Jasmin Samardžić	(substituted off) 91'
FW	(Croatia) Petar Krpan
Substitutes:
FW	(Croatia) Hrvoje Štrok	(substituted on) 55'
MF	(Bosnia and Herzegovina) Dalibor Poldrugač	(substituted on) 75'
FW	(Croatia) Krunoslav Lovrek	(substituted on) 91'
Manager:
(Croatia) Ivan Katalinić

DINAMO ZAGREB:
GK	1	(Croatia) Tomislav Butina
DF	23	(Croatia) Mihael Mikić
DF	17	(Croatia) Damir Krznar
DF	4	(North Macedonia) Goce Sedloski
DF	2	(Croatia) Dario Smoje
DF	5	(Croatia) Kristijan Polovanec	(substituted off) 46'
MF	16	(Croatia) Jerko Leko
MF	7	(Croatia) Silvio Marić
MF	11	(Croatia) Dario Zahora	(substituted off) 79'
MF	10	(Bosnia and Herzegovina) Edin Mujčin	(substituted off) 82'
FW	20	(Romania) Dumitru Mitu
Substitutes:
DF	26	(Croatia) Dino Drpić	(substituted on) 46'
FW	18	(Croatia) Vladimir Petrović	(substituted on) 79'
MF	8	(Croatia) Jasmin Agić	(substituted on) 82'
Manager:
(Croatia) Miroslav Blažević

Assistant referees:
Darko Slivar (Valpovo)
Predrag Borovec (Višnjevac)

Match rules

- 90 minutes.
- 30 minutes of extra-time if necessary.
- Penalty shoot-out if scores still level
- Seven named substitutes.
- Maximum of three substitutions.
