= History of GNK Dinamo Zagreb (2000–present) =

Croatian football club history

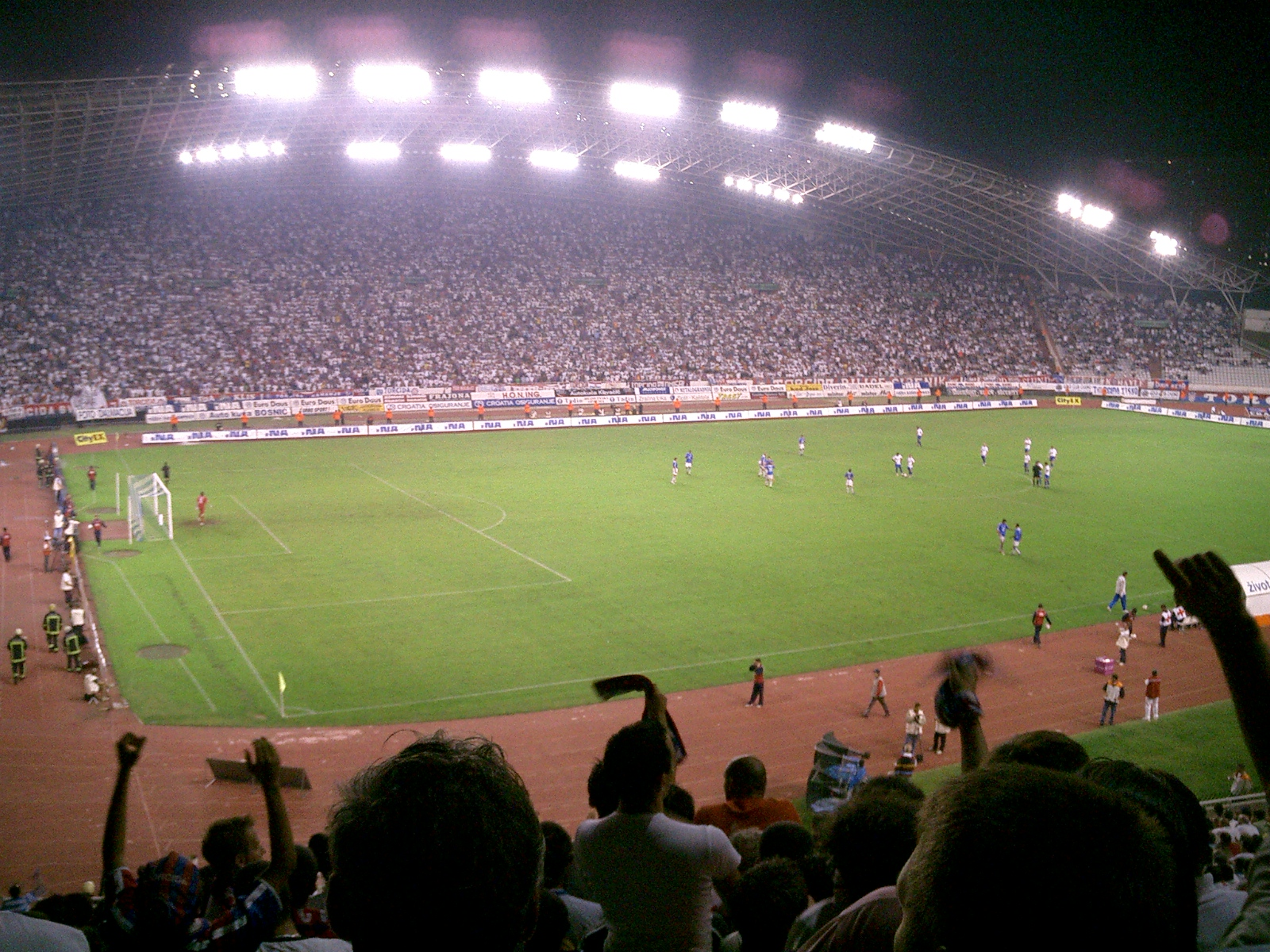
Match against Hajduk Split at Poljud Stadium in 2006

In the new millennium, Dinamo Zagreb continued to land more trophies, winning at least one domestic competition per season, save for 2004–05, when they were knocked–out of the Croatian Cup and finished seventh in Prva HNL.

After the 1999–2000 title-winning campaign, Dražen Ladić, Goran Jurić, Robert Prosinečki, Tomislav Rukavina, Krunoslav Jurčić, Daniel Šarić and Igor Bišćan all either left the club or retired and were replaced by a new generation of players, including Luka Modrić, Eduardo, Vedran Ćorluka, Niko Kranjčar, Mario Mandžukić, Ivica Olić, Tomislav Butina, Dino Drpić, Boško Balaban, Tomislav Šokota, Ivan Turina, Dario Zahora, Mihael Mikić, Danijel Pranjić and Ivan Bošnjak, among others.

The club then changed its name back to Dinamo Zagreb on 14 February 2000 as the former name, Croatia Zagreb, adopted in 1993, had never really been accepted by their fans.

== Into the new century ==
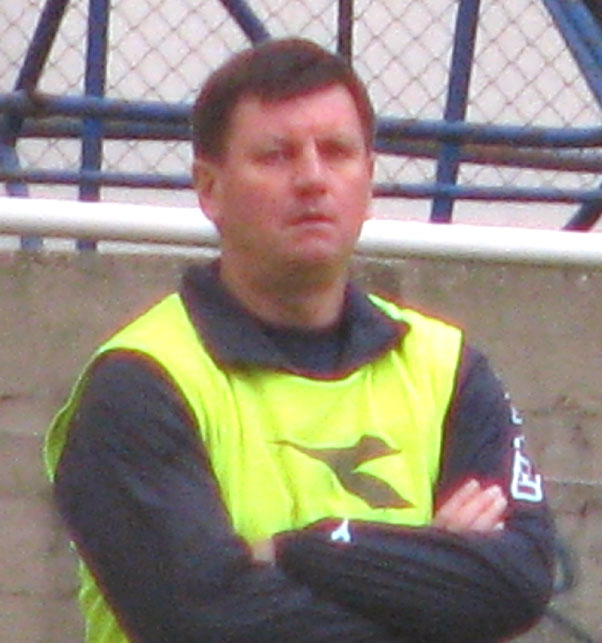
Marijan Vlak had four spells as manager of Dinamo Zagreb between 1997 and 2009.

The newly renamed club won their fifth consecutive title, by a large margin of 14 points ahead of Hajduk Split in the 1999–2000 season. Both clubs qualified for the 2000–01 UEFA Champions League but were knocked out in the qualifying rounds. After being knocked out of the Champions League qualifiers by Milan (with Andriy Shevchenko scoring four goals in two matches against them), Dinamo continued their European season in the UEFA Cup. After defeating Slovan Bratislava in the first round, they were drawn against Parma, where the Italian side won 2–1 on aggregate.

Some of the greatest Dinamo Zagreb players left the club before the summer transfer deadline, leaving the club to rely on younger and rather inexperienced players. They started well in the new season, topping the league after the initial 22 rounds, two points ahead of the second placed NK Osijek. In the championship playoffs, Hajduk Split, who initially sat in third, finished at top of the table, securing their fourth league title, just one point ahead of Dinamo. The club did, however, retain the Cup title after a two–legged victory over Hajduk.

== Decline from 2001–2005 ==
The 2001–02 season started well for Dinamo, as they were through the UEFA Cup qualifying rounds, defeating Flora Tallinn 1–0 in both home and away matches. They were again knocked out early in the competition, losing on away goals rule to Israeli side Maccabi Tel Aviv. In domestic championship, Dinamo started with a 4–2 away win against TŠK Topolovac and a goalless home draw with NK Zadar. The new domestic league format excluded the championship playoffs that were played in the previous season and the league was expanded to 16 clubs. After a series of poor results, club manager Ilija Lončarević was sacked and the newly employed was Marijan Vlak, who had previously served in the role. Vlak led Dinamo to a third–placed finish in the league, behind NK Zagreb and Hajduk Split. He managed to retain the Croatian Cup title before he was replaced by Miroslav Blažević at the end of the season.

The competition format for the 2002–03 Prva HNL had changed, as the number of the clubs competing was reduced to 12 and the championship playoffs were reintroduced. Blažević decided to strengthen the offense which was weakened with the departure of Tomo Šokota, Boško Balaban and Mario Bazina in 2001. He loaned in Balaban from Aston Villa and bought the top goalscorer of the previous Prva HNL season, Ivica Olić, from NK Zagreb. It would prove to be a great transfer deal for Dinamo, as Olić finished the season with 16 league goals, retaining the top goalscorer title. Balaban also had a great impact on the team, bagging 15 goals in 24 league appearances before his loan spell ended. Dinamo was again unsuccessful in European competitions, however, being knocked–out from the second round of 2002–03 UEFA Cup by English side Fulham. Nonetheless, Blažević did manage to secure the Croatian Supercup title against Prva HNL title-holders NK Zagreb. The club was also defeated in the second round of Croatian Cup by Kamen Ingrad.

With no success in Europe and Croatian Cup, Blažević had to salvage the season through domestic championship. After two seasons, Dinamo was back on top as they won their seventh league title with eight points ahead of runners-up Hajduk Split. By the end of the season, Blažević was sacked after having a conflict with his friend and Dinamo vice-president Zdravko Mamić. Following his departure, Dinamo have had five managers over the span of two seasons, which led the club to one of the worst seasons in Croatian football league. Club's star forwards Olić and Balaban left the club as well and were replaced by the less experienced group of Dario Zahora, Eduardo, Mate Dragičević and Goran Ljubojević. Later signings, experienced strikers Veldin Karić, Mladen Bartolović and Zoran Zekić, had even lesser impact on team's overall performance.

New manager Nikola Jurčević secured another Croatian Supercup title, defeating the 2002–03 Croatian Cup winners Hajduk Split 4–1. His success, however, did not follow in the third qualifying round of the Champions League, as Dinamo lost to a Ukrainian champions Dynamo Kyiv by an aggregate score 5–1. The club continued to compete in the UEFA Cup and managed to reach the second round of the competition after defeating MTK Budapest 3–1. They were drawn against another Ukrainian club, Dnipro Dnipropetrovsk, and lost 3–1. Dinamo started the domestic league campaign with two home victories over Zadar and NK Marsonia. By the end of the 22 initial rounds, Dinamo were in second position, five points behind Hajduk and 19 points ahead of Rijeka. Dinamo did not lose a single match in the playoffs, but it was not enough to beat Hajduk Split, who won their fifth Prva HNL title after finishing two points ahead of Dinamo. The club did, however, manage to secure another Croatian Cup title, defeating Varteks on away goals rule after the aggregate score was 1–1. Jurčević was replaced as Dinamo's manager in 2004.

For the 2004–05 Prva HNL season, the squad was strengthened with a number of players, the most notable being Danijel Pranjić and Goce Sedloski. The club had big expectations for the season as they qualified for the group stage of the 2004–05 UEFA Cup. Dinamo previously defeated Primorje and IF Elfsborg and was drawn in group G along with Beveren, Benfica, Heerenveen and VfB Stuttgart. The first match was scheduled at Maksimir Stadion and Dinamo's first opponent was Beveren. Dinamo won the match with a five-goal margin, giving them an excellent start in the group stage. However, they lost both of their away matches, 2–0 to Benfica and 2–1 to VfB Stuttgart. The match against Heerenveen was crucial, as Dinamo had to win to qualify for the round of 32. Although they were leading 2–0, they conceded two late goals, the latter from a penalty kick, and finished fourth in the group's final standings. Meanwhile, the club was underachieving in the domestic championship. After the 22 initial rounds, Dinamo finished in seventh position and failed to reach the championship playoffs. Instead, they continued to compete in the relegation league. Without much trouble, Dinamo finished at the top of the league with a 15-point margin over the relegated Zadar. This was the only season that Dinamo failed to win any domestic trophy, as they were also knocked–out in the quarterfinals of the Croatian Cup by Varteks.

== Revival under Kuže and Ivanković ==
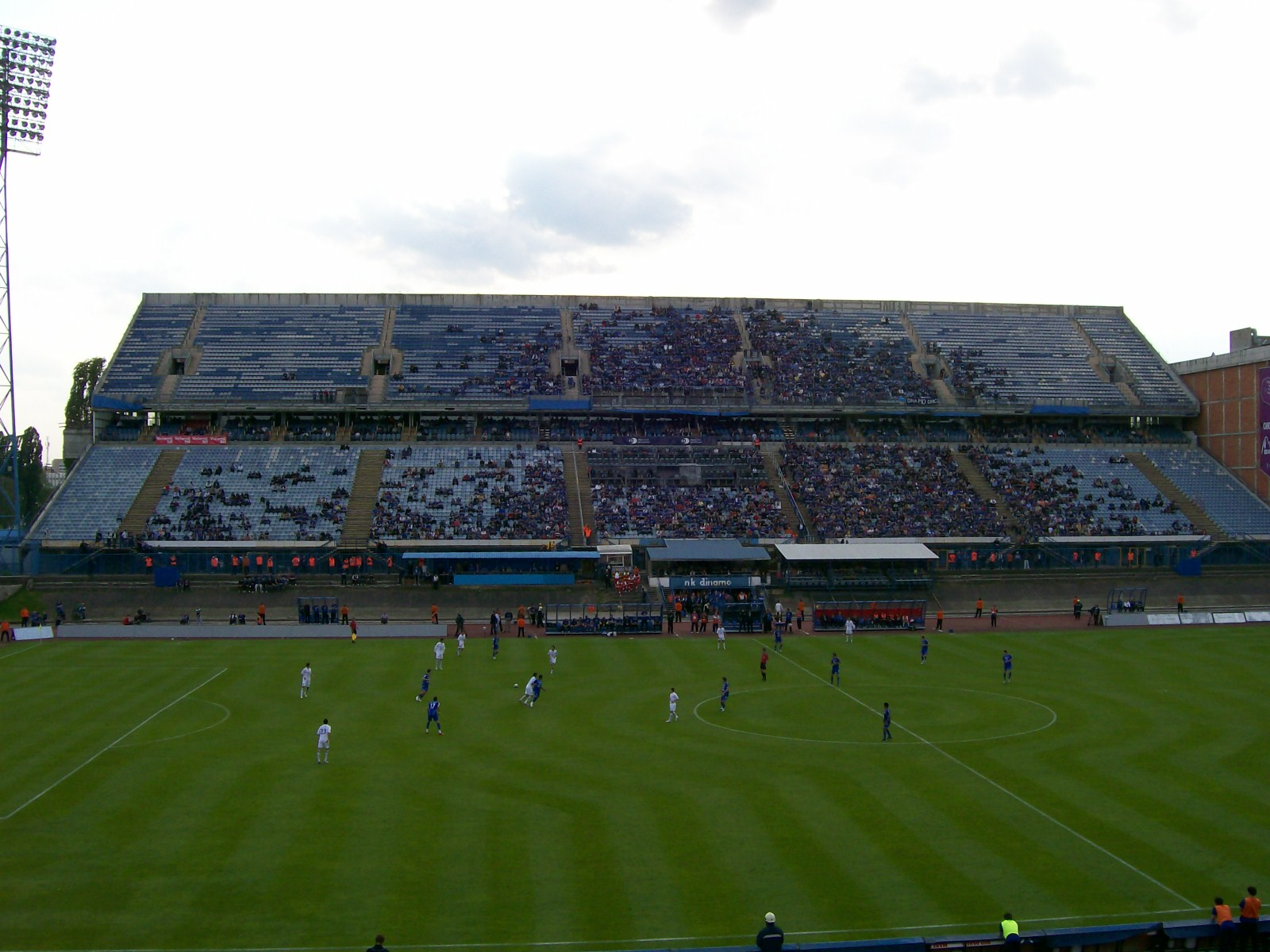
West grandstand picture during the Prva HNL match in 2006

After temporary manager Zvjezdan Cvetković departed, the Dinamo board announced that his replacement would be Josip Kuže, who had managed Dinamo 15 years prior. The squad was strengthened with Luka Modrić and Vedran Ćorluka, who both returned from their loan spells at Inter Zaprešić. The opening game of the season was played in Vinkovci against Cibalia. Dinamo won the game 4–0 but soon faced a narrow 1–0 loss in an away match against Osijek. The club recovered with a two emphatic victories, 5–1 at Maksimir against Rijeka and 6–0 away against Inter Zaprešić. The run continued with two wins against rival teams Slaven Belupo and Varteks, but was again abrupt by a goalless draw against Hajduk Split at the Maksimir. Since Dinamo did not take part in any European competition and was eliminated early in the Croatian Cup, the squad was able to fully devote themselves to the Prva HNL matches, and it saw the team top the league with an 11-point margin over the second placed Rijeka after the season's initial 22 rounds. Dinamo continued to dominate in the championship playoffs and secured their eight league title in front of the runners-up Rijeka and third-placed Slaven Belupo. By the end of the season, however, Kuže announced that he would resign as a Dinamo manager.

His replacement was former Iran national team manager Branko Ivanković. He enjoyed a good start into the new season as he won the Croatian Supercup defeating Rijeka 4–1 and reaching the third qualifying round of the Champions League. He also recorded two home wins at the start of the 2006–07 Prva HNL campaign before the club was to face English side Arsenal in the Champions League. Dinamo Zagreb lost 3–0 at Maksimir and lost any of the hope for reaching Champions League group stage. The away match finished with Arsenal winning 2–1, although Eduardo scored the early opener for Dinamo. It was also the first ever goal to be scored at the new home ground of Arsenal, the Emirates Stadium. Dinamo continued to compete in UEFA Cup, but lost in the first round against French side Auxerre. The club was dominating in domestic competitions, winning 10 out of 13 matches they played. Following the loss against Šibenik in the 13th round of Prva HNL, Dinamo had won 28 league matches in a row. The club finished at the top of the table with 30 wins, two draws and a loss after the 33 round were played. Dinamo also won the Croatian Cup, defeating Slaven Belupo in the finals with an aggregate result 2–1. Eduardo was the top goalscorer of the club, scoring 34 in the league and 13 in other competitions.

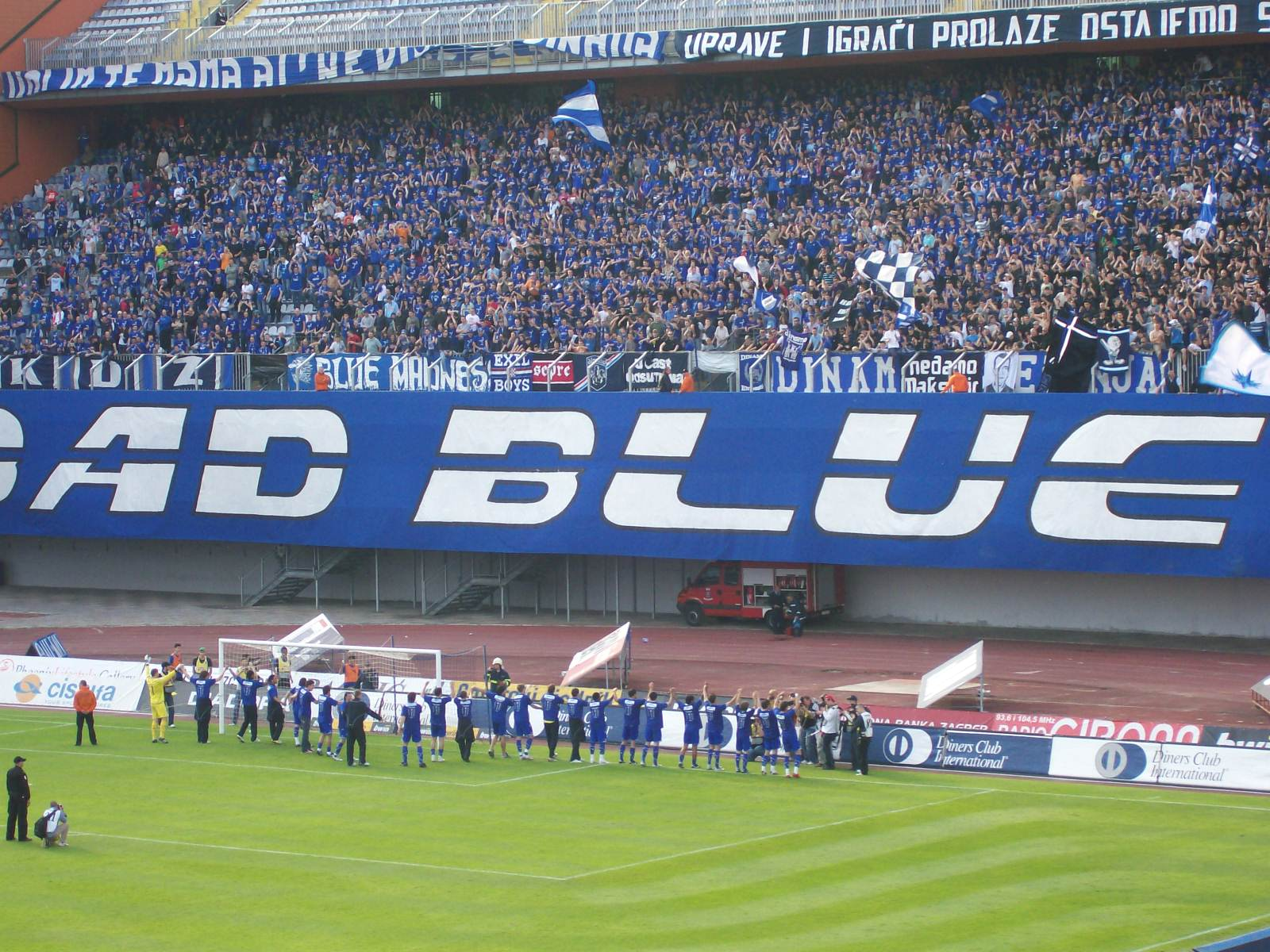
Dinamo Zagreb players celebrate the title with their fans.

The first team squad has seen some major changes in the new season, as the top goalscorer Eduardo had departed to Arsenal for a £7.5 million transfer fee and was replaced by young striker Mario Mandžukić, who was brought to Maksimir from city rivals NK Zagreb. Mandžukić's teammate Ivica Vrdoljak was also signed; the total fee for the duo was €2 million. The club had also signed experienced German goalkeeper Georg Koch, centre-back Gordon Schildenfeld, Ivorian midfielder Did'dy Guela and former star striker for Dinamo, Boško Balaban. Former Dinamo captain Igor Bišćan and Tomislav Mikulić both joined the club during the winter transfer window, while defender Vedran Ćorluka left the club to sign for Manchester City. At the start of the season, Dinamo defeated Azerbaijani champions Khazar Lankaran and Slovene champions NK Domžale and were through to the third qualifying round of 2007–08 UEFA Champions League. The club was drawn to play against German side Werder Bremen and were close to upset in away match at Weserstadion, but the match finished with Bremen winning 2–1. The home match saw two controversial penalty decisions by Norwegian referee Terje Hauge in Bremen's favour. Dinamo lost 3–2 and were knocked–out from the competition.

The club was unseeded team for the first round of 2007–08 UEFA Cup and were drawn with four-time Champions League winners Ajax. The first leg was played at Maksimir, a match which Dinamo lost narrowly after Schildenfeld made fatal back-pass which allowed the away team to score for a 1–0 victory. The second leg match saw Dinamo equalize in the first half of the match, with Luka Modrić scoring from a penalty kick. The match went to extra-time in which Dinamo strikers Mario Mandžukić and Josip Tadić scored for a 3–0 lead. Later in the extra-time, Luka Modrić was tripped in Ajax's 20-yard box, but the referee did not blow the whistle for another penalty kick. The last two minutes saw Dinamo conceding two goals which made the aggregate result 3–3, but Dinamo was through on away goals rule. In the group stage, Dinamo was drawn along with Basel, Brann, Hamburger SV and Rennes. Dinamo played its first match at Maksimir on 8 November against Basel. The match finished in a goalless draw, although Ognjen Vukojević had a clear-cut chance late in the match when he hit the post from the six-yard box. What followed was an unlucky loss in an away match against Brann. Dinamo lost after Shildenfeld made an error and fouled the opposing striker in the penalty area. He was issued a red card and Brann was awarded a penalty kick. Georg Koch was not able to save the penalty and the score was 1–0. Vukojević equalized in the second half, but ten-man Dinamo conceded another goal and the final result was 2–1. Hamburg easily defeated Dinamo 2–0 at Maksimir and Dinamo was practically knocked–out of the competition. The last match in against Rennes finished in a 1–1 draw. Dinamo finished fourth in the group with two points from the draws against the second-placed Basel and last-placed Rennes.

Meanwhile, Dinamo was continuing to dominate in domestic competitions. The club finished first placed with 28 points ahead of the runners-up Slaven Belupo. The club also won the 2008–09 Croatian Cup after defeating Virovitica, Šibenik, Slaven Belupo, NK Zagreb and Hajduk Split. At mid-season, manager Branko Ivanković resigned after having a serious fight with club vice-president Zdravko Mamić. Ivanković's replacement was Zvonimir Soldo, a former Croatia national team player. Soldo won the double and left the club at the end of the season due to the bad atmosphere at the club.

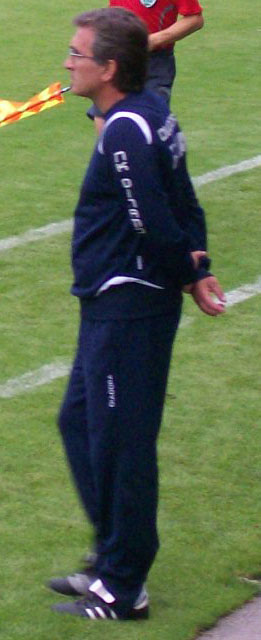
Branko Ivanković as the head coach of Dinamo Zagreb in 2008

On 20 May, the club announced that the new manager will be Branko Ivanković, who will return to his managerial position after being replaced by Soldo in January of the same year. A major changes were made in the senior squad, with number of important first-team players being sold to top-flight European teams. The first to leave was club captain Luka Modrić, who agreed terms with Tottenham Hotspur on 26 April 2009. The transfer was made on 14 May and was worth €21 million. Defender Hrvoje Čale was sold to Trabzonspor for a fee of €2.2 m, followed by Ognjen Vukojević departure for Dynamo Kyiv and Marijan Buljat, Tomislav Mikulić, Dario Jertec, Davor Vugrinec, Tomislav Vranjić, Did'dy Guela and Georg Koch releases from the club. Arriving first was Tomislav Butina, who returned to Dinamo after playing abroad for five years. Mirko Hrgović also joined the club from the Japanese side JEF United. Three South American players were signed: Argentines Luis Ibáñez and Guillermo Suárez, and the Chilean Pedro Morales.

Dinamo Zagreb failed to secure Champions League group stage as they were knocked–out of the competition by Shakhtar Donetsk. Dinamo continued their European season in the first round of UEFA Cup, being drawn against Czech side Sparta Prague. The match at Maksimir finished by a goalless draw in a match which Dinamo dominated from the opening kick-off. In an away game, Dinamo held to 3–3 draw which was enough to secure the group stage by the away goals rule. Dinamo was drawn in Group D along with Udinese, Tottenham, Spartak Moscow and NEC. They played their first match at Maksimir against NEC on 23 October. Dinamo won the match 3–2 with Mandžukić, Balaban and Vrdoljak scoring. Dinamo was then demolished by Tottenham at White Hart Lane, losing 4–0. A few weeks later, Branko Ivanković was again fired by Zdravko Mamić after the two had a serious conflict. Marijan Vlak was appointed as the new manager only two days before a crucial home match against Spartak Moscow. Dinamo lost narrowly 1–0 although they had a few clear cut chances. In the last match away against Udinese the club recorded third consecutive loss and finished at the bottom of the group.

Meanwhile, in the Prva HNL, Dinamo was closely following Hajduk Split, who were first-placed before the winter break. During the winter transfer window, Dinamo signed centre-back Robert Kovač, strikers Ilija Sivonjić and Miroslav Slepička, as well as Argentine defensive midfielder Adrián Calello. The club was eagerly anticipating the match against their biggest rivals, Hajduk. The match was scheduled for the 22 February, the first league match for both clubs after the winter break. Hajduk won 2–0, however, with Nikola Kalinić and Senijad Ibričić scoring. Dinamo was able to recover and continued with two wins against Slaven Belupo and NK Zagreb. On 5 March 2009, Marijan Vlak was replaced with former Dinamo and Croatia international, Krunoslav Jurčić.

== Jurčić's appointment ==
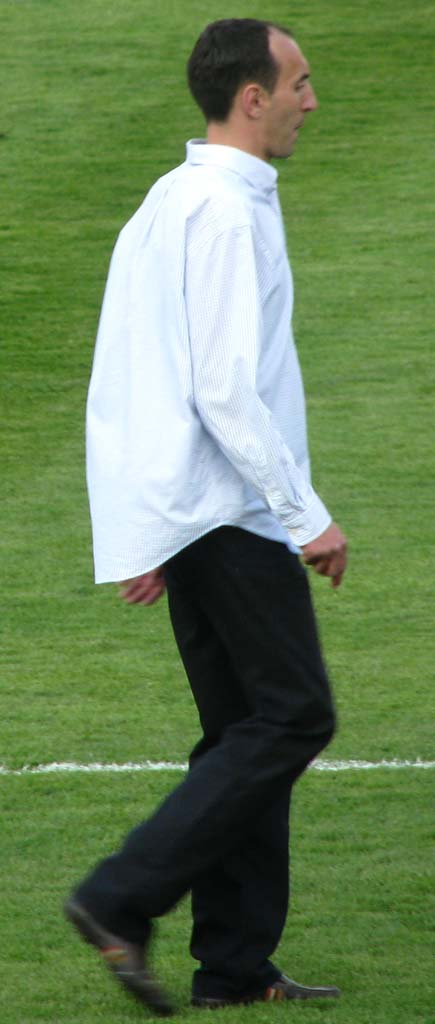
Krunoslav Jurčić in 2009

The team again gained stability under the new manager and Jurčić repaid the faith shown in him by winning Dinamo's third consecutive double. The team finished at the top of the table with six points ahead of runners-up Hajduk Split. Mario Mandžukić was the top league goalscorer, scoring 16 goals in 28 matches. Jurčić also led the club to their tenth Croatian Cup title, defeating Hajduk Split after a penalty shootout at the Stadion Poljud.

In the 2009–10 season, Dinamo director of football Zoran Mamić announced that the club was determined to reach the group stage of the 2009–10 Champions League and some big signings were promised. Some of the players mentioned were Boubacar Sanogo, Ivan Klasnić, Nikola Pokrivač and Mato Jajalo, but the players rejected offers from Dinamo. The club was successful to sign Greek striker Dimitrios Papadopoulos and full-back Leandro Cufré, who were arguably one of the best foreign footballers that played for Dinamo in recent years. Emiljano Vila was bought from Teuta Durrës and Denis Glavina joined the club on a loan from Vorskla Poltava. Manager Jurčić also introduced youth team players Domagoj Antolić, Josip Pivarić and Andrej Kramarić to Dinamo's senior squad, but only the latter was able to compete for the first–team squad while Pivarić and Antolić were loaned to Lokomotiva.

As the season got underway, Dinamo recorded some major wins in domestic championship and walked-over Armenian champions Pyunik in the second qualifying round of the Champions League. To the disappointment of fans, however, the club was eliminated already in the third qualifying round by Austrian champions Red Bull Salzburg. Dinamo were then drawn against Scottish side Hearts in 2009–10 Europa League. In front of 22,000 fans, Dinamo demolished Hearts 4–0 at Maksimir. Although they lost 2–0 away at Tynecastle Stadium, the club secured place in the group stage draw of the first ever Europa League competition, after its rebranding from the UEFA Cup. Dinamo was seeded in the third pot, being drawn with Ajax, Anderlecht and Timișoara. Meanwhile, they continued to dominate in the Prva HNL, scoring an average of 4.5 goals per match and winning in five out of six matches.

== Performance in the Croatian Cup ==
The first Croatian Cup title in new century came already in 2000–01 season, as Dinamo defeated their biggest rivals Hajduk Split 3–0 over two legged match, prevailing 2–0 at Poljud and 1–0 at Maksimir. Since then, the club has entered all of the Croatian Cup competitions, winning the title on six occasions, the latest being in 2009 when they defeated Hajduk again, this time after a penalty shootout.

=== Results ===
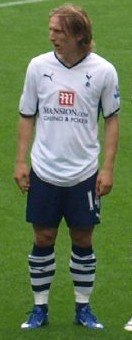
One of the greatest Croatian and Dinamo Zagreb players, Luka Modrić

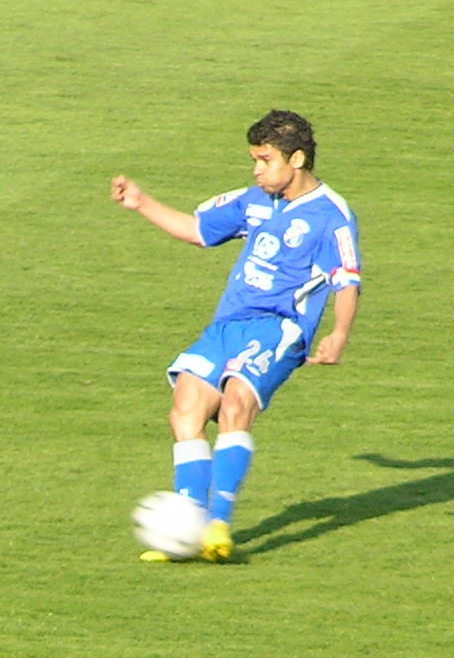
Eduardo will be remembered as one of the most lethal strikers of Dinamo Zagreb.

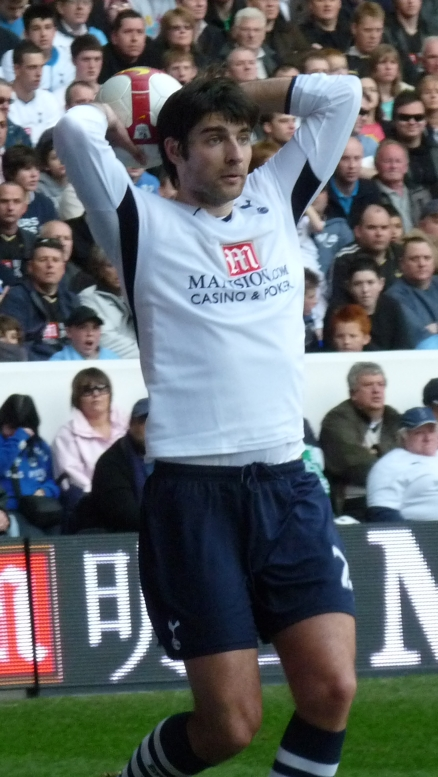
Vedran Ćorluka is among the players that had Dinamo Zagreb as a ladder to greater success.

Season	Round	Opponent	Home	Away	Agg.
2000–01	R1	Mladost Molve	-	9–0	-
2000–01	R2	Šibenik	2–0	-	-
2000–01	QF	Kamen Ingrad	3–2	4–0	7–2
2000–01	SF	NK Zagreb	4–1	0–1	4–2
2000–01	F	Hajduk Split	1–0	2–0	3–0
2001–02	R1	Željezničar Sl. Brod	-	3–0	-
2001–02	R2	Kamen Ingrad	-	4–1	-
2001–02	QF	Rijeka	1–0	1–0	2–0
2001–02	SF	Osijek	2–0	1–2	3–2
2001–02	F	Varteks	1–1	1–0	2–1
2002–03	R1	Hajduk Vela Luka	-	6–0	-
2002–03	R2	Kamen Ingrad	-	1–2	-
2003–04	R1	Lučko	-	3–0	-
2003–04	R2	Bjelovar	-	4–1	-
2003–04	QF	Osijek	3–1	2–0	5–1
2003–04	SF	Rijeka	4–2	0–1	4–3
2003–04	F	Varteks	0–0	1–1	1–1 (a)
2004–05	R1	Sladorana Županja	-	4–0	-
2004–05	R2	Belišće	3–2	-	-
2004–05	QF	Varteks	0–0	0–1	0–1
2005–06	R1	HAŠK	-	8–0	-
2005–06	R2	Naftaš Ivanić	-	2–3	-
2006–07	R1	Grobničan	-	2–0	-
2006–07	R2	Šibenik	3–0	-	-
2006–07	QF	Inter Zaprešić	2–1	2–1	4–2
2006–07	SF	Hajduk Split	1–0	2–2	3–2
2006–07	F	Slaven Belupo	1–0	1–1	2–1
2007–08	R1	Virovitica	-	3–1 (aet)	-
2007–08	R2	Šibenik	-	3–2	-
2007–08	QF	Slaven Belupo	2–1	1–0	3–1
2007–08	SF	NK Zagreb	3–1	3–2	6–3
2007–08	F	Hajduk Split	3–0	0–0	3–0
2008–09	R1	Gaj Mače	-	5–1	-
2008–09	R2	Hrvatski Dragovoljac	-	6–0	-
2008–09	QF	Zagora Unešić	5–1	2–1	7–2
2008–09	SF	NK Zagreb	4–1	2–0	6–1
2008–09	F	Hajduk Split	3–0	0–3	3–3 (4–3 p)
2009–10	R1	Plitvica	-	4–0	-
2009–10	R2	Vinogradar	-	4–1	-
2009–10	QF	Pomorac	3–2	2–0	5-2
2009–10	SF	Hajduk Split	0–0	0–1	0-1

=== Summary ===
Season	Pld	W	D	L	GF	GA	GD	Final round
2000–01	8	7	0	1	25	3	+22	Winners
2001–02	8	6	1	1	14	4	+10	Winners
2002–03	2	1	0	1	7	2	+5	2nd Round
2003–04	8	5	2	1	17	6	+11	Winners
2004–05	4	2	1	1	7	3	+4	Quarterfinals
2005–06	2	1	0	1	10	3	+7	2nd Round
2006–07	8	6	2	0	14	5	+9	Winners
2007–08	8	7	1	0	18	7	+11	Winners
2008–09	8	7	0	1	27	7	+20	Winners
2009–10	6	4	1	1	13	4	+9	Semifinal
Total	62	47	8	8	156	44	+112	

Pld = Matches played; W = Matches won; D = Matches drawn; L = Matches lost; GF = Goals for; GA = Goals against; GD = Goal difference.

== UEFA competitions record ==
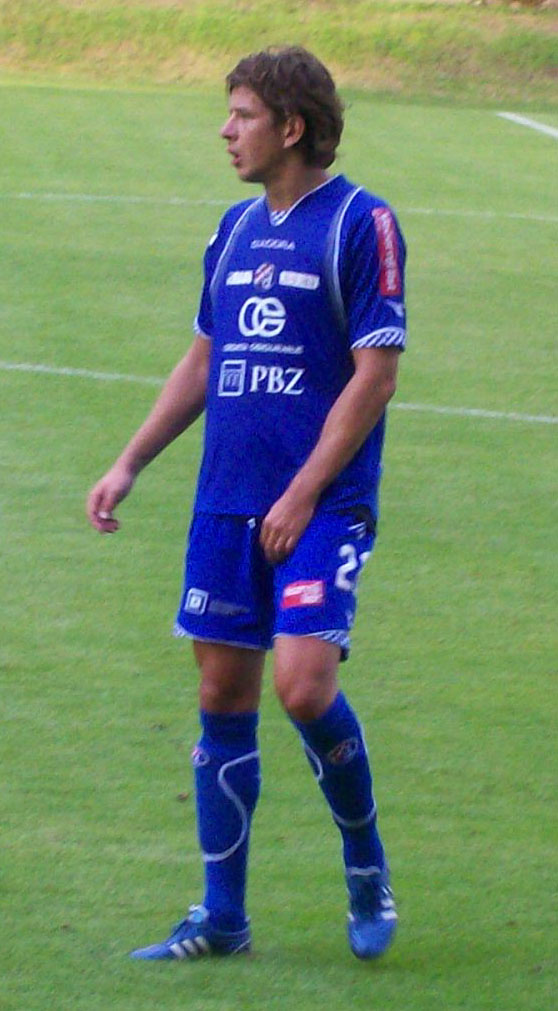
Dino Drpić recorded 201 league appearances for Dinamo and scored 13 goals.

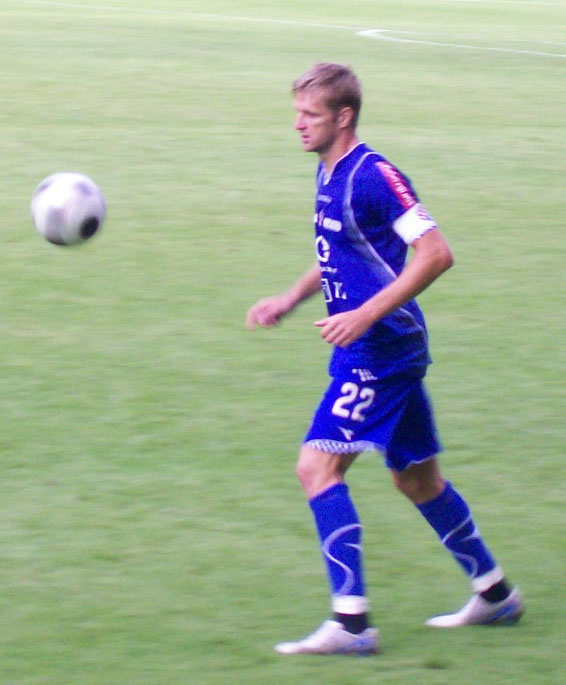
Igor Bišćan after returning to Dinamo in 2008

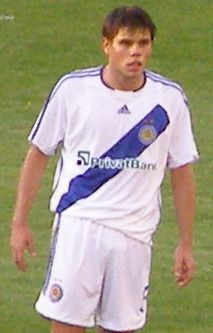
Ognjen Vukojević, 2006–2008 Dinamo Zagreb player

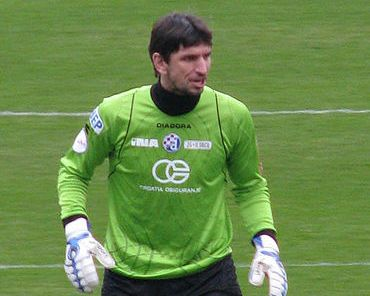
Tomislav Butina returned to Dinamo in 2008 and was one of the key players to Dinamo's European success.

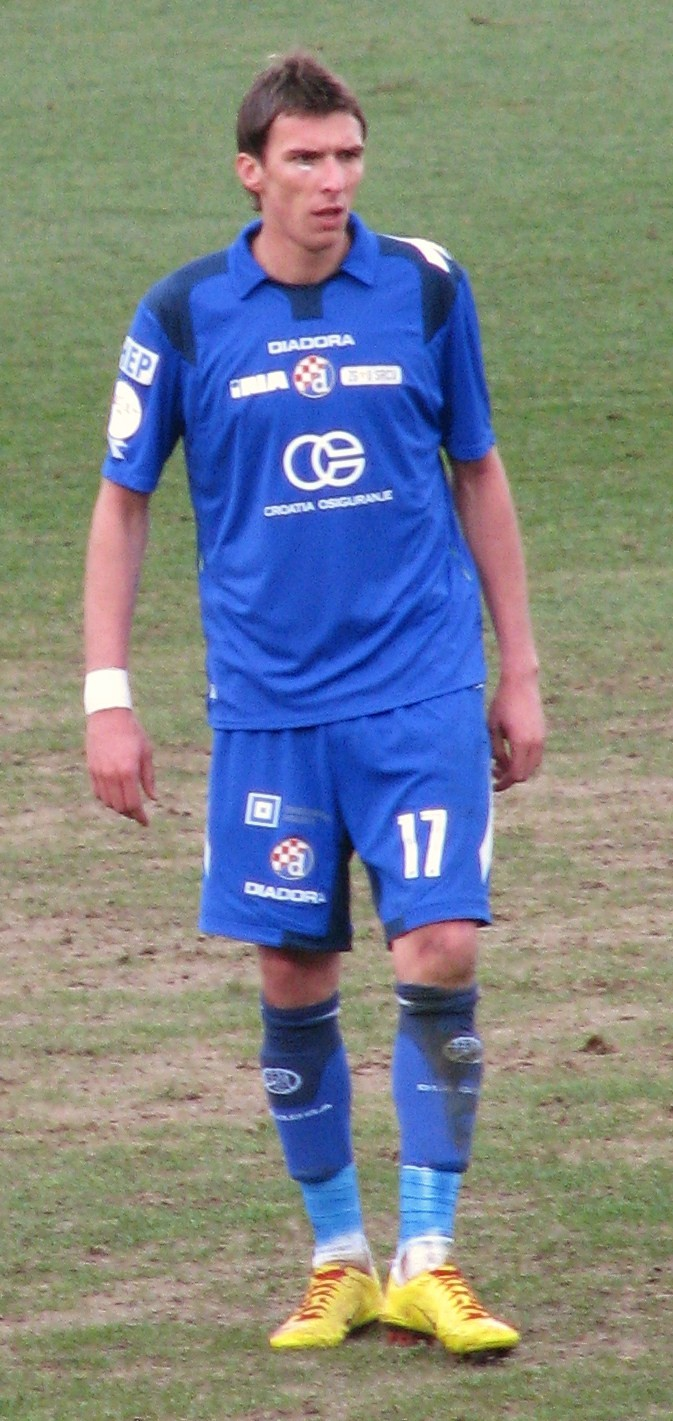
Mario Mandžukić, 2007-2010 Dinamo Zagreb player

=== Results ===
Season	Competition	Round	Opponent	Home	Away	Agg.
2000–01	Champions League	QR3	(Italy) Milan	0–3	1–3	1–6
2000–01	UEFA Cup	R1	(Slovakia) Slovan Bratislava	1–1	3–0	4–1
2000–01	UEFA Cup	R2	(Italy) Parma	1–0	0–2	1–2
2001–02	UEFA Cup	QR	(Estonia) Flora Tallinn	1–0	1–0	2–0
2001–02	UEFA Cup	R1	(Israel) Maccabi Tel Aviv	2–2	1–1	3–3 (a)
2002–03	UEFA Cup	R1	(Hungary) Zalaegerszegi	6–0	3–1	9–1
2002–03	UEFA Cup	R2	(England) Fulham	0–3	1–2	1–5
2003–04	Champions League	QR2	(Slovenia) Maribor	2–1	1–1	3–2
2003–04	Champions League	QR3	(Ukraine) Dynamo Kyiv	0–2	1–3	1–5
2003–04	UEFA Cup	R1	(Hungary) MTK Hungária	3–1	0–0	3–1
2003–04	UEFA Cup	R2	(Ukraine) Dnipro Dnipropetrovsk	0–2	1–1	1–3
2004–05	UEFA Cup	QR2	(Slovenia) Primorje	4–0	0–2	4–2
2004–05	UEFA Cup	R1	(Sweden) IF Elfsborg	2–0	0–0	2–0
2004–05	UEFA Cup	GS	(Belgium) Beveren	6–1	-	-
2004–05	UEFA Cup	GS	(Portugal) Benfica	-	0–2	-
2004–05	UEFA Cup	GS	(Netherlands) Heerenveen	2–2	-	-
2004–05	UEFA Cup	GS	(Germany) VfB Stuttgart	-	1–2	-
2006–07	Champions League	QR2	(Lithuania) Ekranas	5–2	4–1	9–3
2006–07	Champions League	QR3	(England) Arsenal	0–3	1–2	1–5
2006–07	UEFA Cup	R1	(France) Auxerre	1–2	1–3	2–5
2007–08	Champions League	QR1	(Azerbaijan) Khazar Lankaran	3–1	1–1	4–2
2007–08	Champions League	QR2	(Slovenia) Domžale	3–1	2–1	5–2
2007–08	Champions League	QR3	(Germany) Werder Bremen	2–3	1–2	3–5
2007–08	UEFA Cup	R1	(Netherlands) Ajax	0–1	3–2	3–3 (a)
2007–08	UEFA Cup	GS	(Switzerland) Basel	0–0	-	-
2007–08	UEFA Cup	GS	(Norway) Brann	-	1–2	-
2007–08	UEFA Cup	GS	(Germany) Hamburger SV	0–2	-	-
2007–08	UEFA Cup	GS	(France) Rennes	-	1–1	-
2008–09	Champions League	QR1	(Northern Ireland) Linfield	1–1	2–0	3–1
2008–09	Champions League	QR2	(Slovenia) Domžale	3–2	3–0	6–2
2008–09	Champions League	QR3	(Ukraine) Shakhtar Donetsk	1–3	0–2	1–5
2008–09	UEFA Cup	R1	(Czech Republic) Sparta Prague	0–0	3–3	3–3 (a)
2008–09	UEFA Cup	GS	(Netherlands) NEC	3–2	-	-
2008–09	UEFA Cup	GS	(England) Tottenham Hotspur	-	0–4	-
2008–09	UEFA Cup	GS	(Russia) Spartak Moscow	0–1	-	-
2008–09	UEFA Cup	GS	(Italy) Udinese	-	1–2	-
2009–10	Champions League	QR2	(Armenia) Pyunik	3–0	0–0	3–0
2009–10	Champions League	QR3	(Austria) Red Bull Salzburg	1–2	1–1	2–3
2009–10	Europa League	PO	(Scotland) Hearts	4–0	0–2	4–2
2009–10	Europa League	GS	(Belgium) Anderlecht	0–2	1–0	-
2009–10	Europa League	GS	(Romania) Timișoara	1–2	3–0	-
2009–10	Europa League	GS	(Netherlands) Ajax	0–2	1–2	-
2010–11	Champions League	QR2	(Slovenia) Koper	5–1	0–3	5–4
2010–11	Champions League	QR3	(Moldova) Sheriff Tiraspol	1–1	1–1	(5-6 p)
2010–11	Europa League	PO	(Hungary) Győr ETO	2–0	2–1	4-1
2010–11	Europa League	GS	(Spain) Villarreal	2–0	-	-
2010–11	Europa League	GS	(Greece) PAOK	-	0–1	-
2010–11	Europa League	GS	(Belgium) Club Brugge	0–0	2–0	-

=== Summary ===
Competition	Pld	W	D	L	GF	GA	GD	Last season played
UEFA Champions League	30	10	8	12	50	46	+4	2010–11
UEFA Cup / UEFA Europa League	51	19	12	20	70	60	+10	2010–11
Total	81	29	20	32	120	106	+14	

Pld = Matches played; W = Matches won; D = Matches drawn; L = Matches lost; GF = Goals for; GA = Goals against; GD = Goal difference.

== Notable players ==
Players indicated in bold were capped for their respective national teams while playing for Dinamo Zagreb.

- (Croatia) **Jasmin Agić** (2000–2005, 2006–07)
- (Croatia) **Milan Badelj** (2006–2012 )
- (Croatia) **Boško Balaban** (2000–01, 2002–03, 2007–2009)
- (Croatia) **Igor Bišćan** (1997–2000, 2007– 2012)
- (Croatia) **Ivan Bošnjak** (2003–2006)
- (Croatia) **Marcelo Brozović** (2012–2015)
- (Croatia) **Marijan Buljat** (2004–2008)
- (Croatia) **Tomislav Butina** (1992–2003, 2008–2010)
- (Brazil) Carlos^{1} (2005–2011 )
- (Slovenia) **Boštjan Cesar** (2000–2005)
- (Cameroon) **Mathias Chago**^{1} (2005–2012 )
- (Croatia) Hrvoje Čale (2003–2008)
- (Croatia) **Vedran Ćorluka** (2003–2007)
- (Croatia) **Dino Drpić** (2000–2009)
- (Croatia) **Eduardo** (2001–2007)
- (Brazil) Etto^{1} (2005–2011 )
- (Croatia) Tin Jedvaj (2005–2013)
- (Croatia) **Niko Kranjčar** (2001–2004)
- (Croatia) Jerko Leko (2000–2002)
- (Croatia) **Dejan Lovren** (2005–2010)
- (Croatia) **Mario Mandžukić** (2007–2010)
- (Croatia) Mihael Mikić (1997–2004, 2007–2008)
- (Croatia) **Luka Modrić** (2002–2008)
- (Bosnia and Herzegovina) **Edin Mujčin**^{1} (1995–2001, 2002–2005)
- (Croatia) Dario Šimić (1992–1998, 2010)
- (Croatia) **Ivica Olić** (2002–2003)
- (Croatia) **Danijel Pranjić** (2004–2005)
- (Brazil) **Sammir**^{1} (2007–2014, 2017. )
- (North Macedonia) **Goce Sedloski**^{1} (1999–2004, 2005)
- (Croatia) **Josip Šimunić** (2011–2014)
- (Croatia) Tomislav Šokota (1997–2001, 2007–2009)
- (Algeria) **El Arabi Hillel Soudani** (2013–2018 )
- (Croatia) Ante Tomić (2001–2010 )
- (Croatia) **Ivan Turina** (2000–01, 2003–2007)
- (Croatia) Ivica Vrdoljak (2007–2010)
- (Croatia) **Ognjen Vukojević** (2006–2008)
- (Croatia) Dario Zahora (2003–2009)

^{1} player holds Croatian citizenship
