= 2003 Croatian Football Super Cup =

Dinamo Zagreb	Hajduk Split
4	1
- Date: 20 July 2003
- Venue: Stadion Maksimir, Zagreb
- Man of the Match: Ivica Olić (Dinamo Zagreb)
- Referee: Ivan Bebek (Rijeka)
- Attendance: 7,000

The 2003 Croatian Football Super Cup was the fifth edition of the Croatian Football Super Cup, a football match contested by the winners of the previous season's Croatian First League and Croatian Football Cup competitions. The match was played on 20 July 2003 at Stadion Maksimir in Zagreb between 2002–03 Croatian First League winners Dinamo Zagreb and 2002–03 Croatian Football Cup winners Hajduk Split.

== Match details ==
20 July 2003
20:00 CEST

Dinamo Zagreb	4–1	Hajduk Split
Tomić 30'; Sedloski 48'; Eduardo 75'; Zahora 90+2'	Report (in Croatian)	T. Rukavina 23'

Stadion Maksimir, Zagreb
Attendance: 7,000
Referee: Ivan Bebek (Rijeka)

DINAMO ZAGREB:
GK	(Croatia) Mario Jozić
DF	(Croatia) Mihael Mikić
DF	(Bosnia and Herzegovina) Edin Mujčin
DF	(North Macedonia) Goce Sedloski
DF	(Croatia) Andre Mijatović
DF	(Croatia) Dino Drpić
MF	(Croatia) Jasmin Agić	Booked
MF	(Croatia) Ante Tomić
MF	(Croatia) Ivica Olić		(substituted off) 81'
MF	(Croatia) Niko Kranjčar		(substituted off) 89'
FW	(Romania) Dumitru Mitu		(substituted off) 66'
Substitutes:
FW	(Brazil) Eduardo da Silva	Booked	(substituted on) 66'
FW	(Croatia) Dario Zahora		(substituted on) 81'
MF	(Croatia) Dalibor Poldrugač		(substituted on) 89'
Manager:
(Croatia) Nikola Jurčević

HAJDUK SPLIT:
GK	(Croatia) Zlatko Runje
DF	(Croatia) Tomislav Rukavina		(substituted off) 41'
DF	(Croatia) Vlatko Đolonga
DF	(Croatia) Hrvoje Vuković
DF	(Croatia) Hrvoje Vejić	Booked
DF	(Croatia) Mato Neretljak	Booked
MF	(Croatia) Srđan Andrić	(yellow card) (yellow-red card) 90'
MF	(Croatia) Dean Računica	(red card) 75'
FW	(Croatia) Petar Krpan		(substituted off) 77'
MF	(Croatia) Mario Carević
FW	(Bosnia and Herzegovina) Almir Turković		(substituted off) 62'
Substitutes:
FW	(Croatia) Nino Bule		(substituted on) 41'
FW	(Bosnia and Herzegovina) Dragan Blatnjak		(substituted on) 62'
DF	(Croatia) Stjepan Skočibušić		(substituted on) 77'
Manager:
(Croatia) Zoran Vulić

Assistant referees:
Željko Novosel (Vrbovec)
Tomislav Petrović (Valpovo)

Match rules

- 90 minutes.
- 30 minutes of extra-time if necessary.
- Penalty shoot-out if scores still level
- Seven named substitutes.
- Maximum of three substitutions.
