= 2006 Croatian Football Super Cup =

Dinamo Zagreb	Rijeka
4	1
- Date: 19 July 2006
- Venue: Stadion Maksimir, Zagreb
- Referee: Draženko Kovačić (Križevci)
- Attendance: 8,000

The 2006 Croatian Football Super Cup was the eighth edition of the Croatian Football Super Cup, a football match contested by the winners of the previous season's Croatian First League and Croatian Football Cup competitions. The match was played on 17 July 2006 at Stadion Maksimir in Split between 2005–06 Croatian First League winners Dinamo Zagreb and 2005–06 Croatian Football Cup winners Rijeka.

== Match details ==
19 July 2006
20:15

Dinamo Zagreb	4–1	Rijeka
Etto 20'; Modrić 40'; Eduardo 62' (pen.), 67'	Report (in Croatian)	Bolić 51'

Stadion Maksimir, Zagreb
Attendance: 15,000
Referee: Draženko Kovačić (Križevci)

DINAMO ZAGREB:
GK	(Croatia) Ivan Turina
DF	(Brazil) Etto
DF	(Croatia) Hrvoje Čale
DF	(Croatia) Vedran Ćorluka
DF	(Croatia) Mario Cvitanović
MF	(Croatia) Ognjen Vukojević
MF	(Croatia) Marijan Buljat		(substituted off) 77'
MF	(Croatia) Jasmin Agić		(substituted off) 60'
FW	(Brazil) Eduardo da Silva
FW	(Croatia) Luka Modrić
FW	(Croatia) Davor Vugrinec	Booked	(substituted off) 83'
Substitutes:
DF	(Brazil) Carlos		(substituted on) 60'
FW	(Croatia) Goran Ljubojević		(substituted on) 77'
DF	(Croatia) Dino Drpić		(substituted on) 83'
Manager:
(Croatia) Josip Kuže

RIJEKA:
GK	(Serbia) Dragan Žilić
DF	(Croatia) Daniel Šarić
DF	(Croatia) Krunoslav Rendulić	Booked
DF	(Croatia) Dario Knežević
DF	(Australia) Eddy Bosnar
MF	(Bosnia and Herzegovina) Dušan Kerkez
MF	(Croatia) Mario Prišć
MF	(Croatia) Goran Rubil
FW	(Bosnia and Herzegovina) Elvir Bolić		(substituted off) 68'
FW	(Croatia) Siniša Linić		(substituted off) 46'
FW	(Croatia) Mihael Mikić		(substituted off) 46'
Substitutes:
DF	(Croatia) Manuel Pamić	Booked	(substituted on) 46'
MF	(Croatia) Josip Lukunić	Booked	(substituted on) 46'
MF	(Croatia) Dragan Tadić		(substituted on) 68'
Manager:
(Croatia) Dragan Skočić

Assistant referees:
Željko Novosel (Vrbovec)
Željko Grgec (Bistra)

Match rules

- 90 minutes.
- 30 minutes of extra-time if necessary.
- Penalty shoot-out if scores still level
- Seven named substitutes.
- Maximum of three substitutions.
