= Dario Zahora =

Croatian footballer (born in 1982)

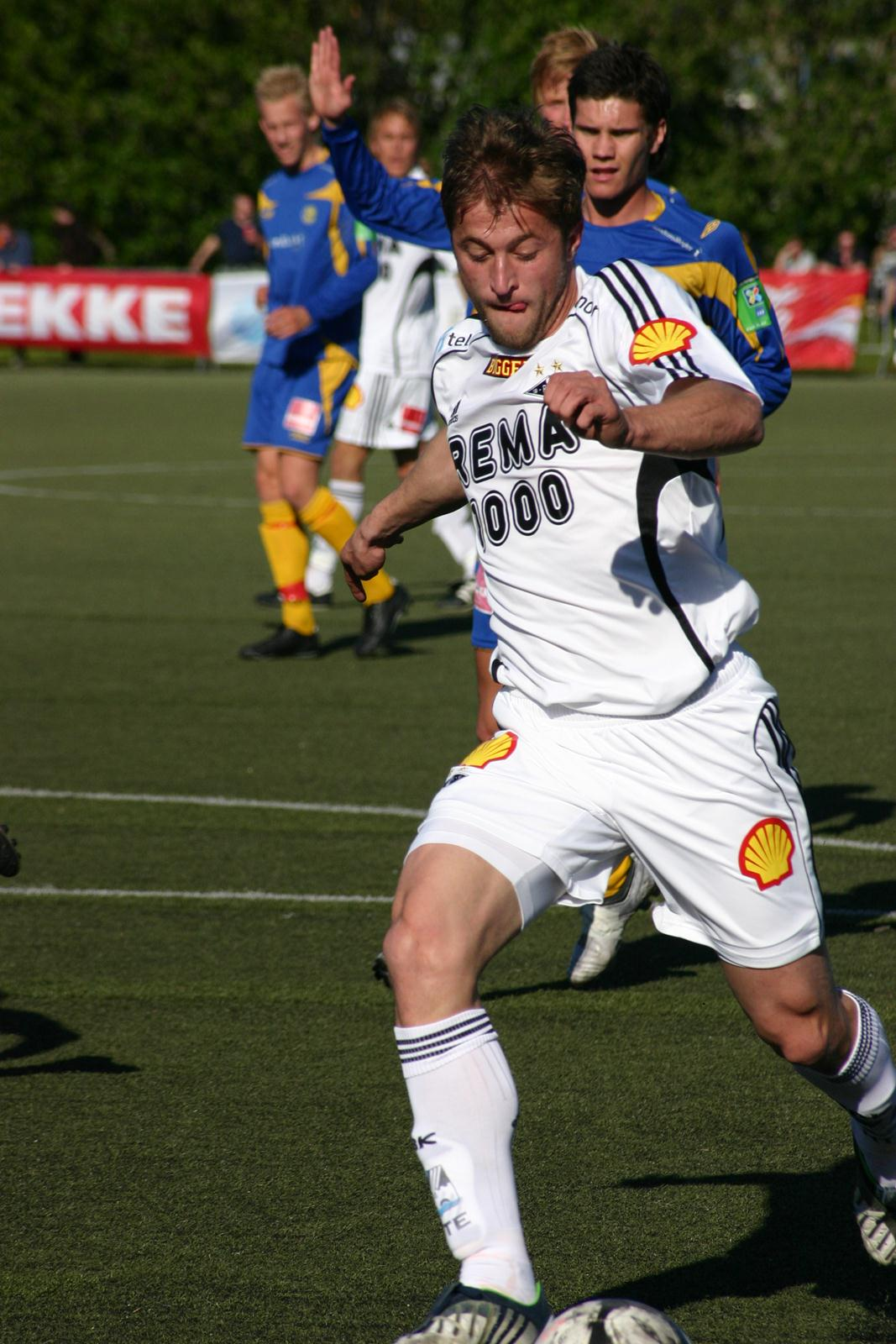
- Zahora playing for Rosenborg

Personal information
- Date of birth: 21 March 1982 (age 44)
- Place of birth: Vukovar, Croatia
- Height: 1.78 m (5 ft 10 in)
- Position: Striker

Senior career*
Years	Team	Apps	(Gls)
2000–2009	Dinamo Zagreb	94	(39)
2000–2001	→ Croatia Sesvete (loan)	24	(15)
2005–2006	→ Koper (loan)	18	(9)
2006–2007	→ Slaven Belupo (loan)	10	(3)
2007–2008	→ Domžale (loan)	34	(22)
2008–2009	→ Interblock (loan)	21	(13)
2009–2010	Rosenborg	5	(0)
2010	Bnei Sakhnin	5	(1)
2011	Lokomotiva	22	(13)
2011	Lokomotiv Plovdiv	31	(0)
2011–2012	Osijek	13	(6)
2012–2013	Ergotelis	32	(8)
2013–2014	Iraklis	32	(9)
2016	FK AS Trenčín	0	(0)
Total		341	(138)

International career^{‡}
1998	Croatia U15	5	(3)
1999	Croatia U16	11	(10)
1998–1999	Croatia U17	10	(6)
1999–2000	Croatia U18	3	(2)
1999–2000	Croatia U19	6	(7)
2000–2002	Croatia U20	7	(0)
2002–2004	Croatia U21	18	(0)
- * Club domestic league appearances and goals as of 6 August 2014 ‡ National team caps and goals as of 1 June 2004

Dario Zahora (born 21 March 1982 in Vukovar) is a Croatian former football striker. Zahora started his career from Croatian team Dinamo Zagreb. From there he was loaned out to Croatia Sesvete, Koper, Slaven Belupo, Domžale and Interblock. He continued his career to Rosenborg before joining Bnei Sakhnin. After Israel he had short spells with Lokomotiva, Lokomotiv Plovdiv and Osijek before moving to Greece for Ergotelis and Iraklis.

Zahora has made several appearances for the Croatian U21 team, also playing for other junior teams from his home country.

== Club career ==
Zahora started his career with Dinamo Zagreb with which he scored 39 goals from 2001 to 2005. He made his professional debut with Croatia Sesvete in Druga HNL, the second tier of Croatia, scoring 15 goals in 24 appearances. After playing for Dinamo Zagreb for four seasons he was loaned out to Slovenian PrvaLiga outfit Koper where he appeared on 18 occasions scoring a total of 9 goals. In the next season he was loaned to Slaven Belupo making 3 goals out of 10 matches. In the 2007–08 season he played for NK Domžale in Slovenia, on loan, where he won the championship and was the league's top goalscorer with 22 goals in 34 matches.

On 31 August 2012 he signed for Greek Football League club Ergotelis. He scored 8 goals for Ergotelis in 32 matches. On 4 July 2013 he signed for Iraklis in the Greek Football League. He scored on his debut for his new club in an away 3–2 loss against Kavala.

== Honours ==
Dinamo Zagreb

- Croatian First Football League: 2002–03, 2005–06
- Croatian Cup: 2000–01, 2001–02, 2003–04
- Croatian Super Cup: 2002, 2003

Domžale

- Slovenian PrvaLiga: 2007–08
- Slovenian Supercup: 2007

Interblock

- Slovenian Supercup: 2008

Rosenborg

- Tippeligaen: 2009
