= Patrice Kwedi =

Cameroonian footballer (born 1983)

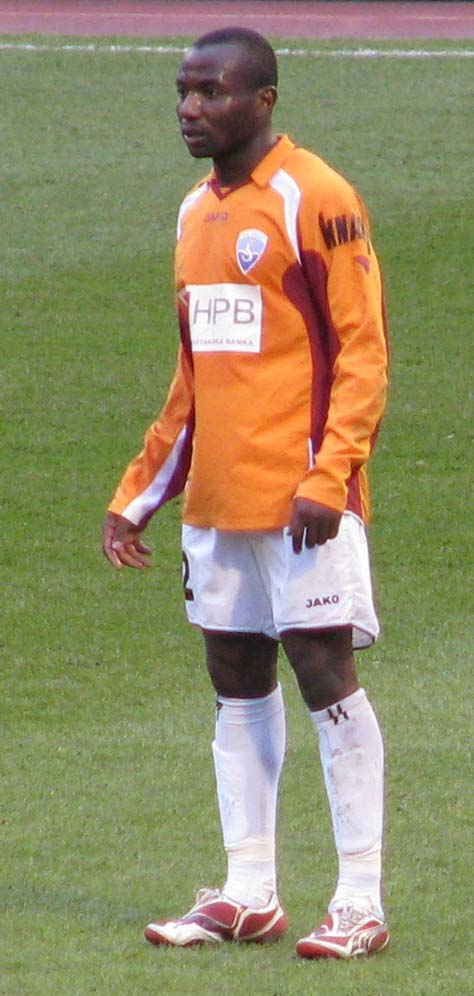
- Kwedi playing for Šibenik

Personal information
- Date of birth: 30 September 1983 (age 43)
- Place of birth: Yaoundé, Cameroon
- Height: 1.71 m (5 ft 7 1/2 in)
- Position: Right back

Youth career
- 2000: Olympic Mvolyé
- 2001–2002: Dinamo Zagreb

Senior career*
Years	Team	Apps	(Gls)
2002–2007	Dinamo Zagreb	5	(0)
2002–2003	→ Inter Zaprešić (loan)	5	(0)
2003–2004	→ Pomorac Kostrena (loan)	10	(0)
2004	→ IFK Göteborg (loan)	3	(0)
2005	→ AGF (loan)	7	(0)
2005	→ NK Karlovac (loan)	12	(1)
2006	→ NK Novalja (loan)	8	(0)
2006–2009	→ HNK Šibenik (loan)	23	(1)
2007	→ Inter Zaprešić (loan)	9	(0)
2009–2010	HNK Šibenik	32	(0)
2010	NK Zelina	18	(0)
2010–2011	Dugo Selo	25	(0)
2011	Dunajská Streda B	6	(0)
2011–2014	NK Sesvete	48	(0)
2015	NK Nedelišće		
2015	Dugo Selo		
2016–2023	Sesvetski Kraljevec		
2023–2024	Inker Zaprešić		
2024–2025	Bedekovčina		
- * Club domestic league appearances and goals

Patrice Kwedi (born 30 September 1983, in Yaoundé) is a professional Cameroonian footballer who plays as a right back.

== Career ==
Kwedi has previously played in the Croatian Prva HNL for NK Dinamo Zagreb, NK Inter Zaprešić and HNK Šibenik. Kwedi was also playing for Croatian lower-league clubs NK Zelina and NK Dugo Selo before joining NK Sesvete in spring 2011.

As of 2015 Kwedi worked as a warehouse worker for the Croatian retail chain Konzum. Since 2016, and as of 2019, Kwedi has been actively playing for the fifth-tier side Sesvetski Kraljevec.

== Personal life ==
Patrice Kwedi is married to a Croatian woman, and is fluent in both Croatian and French. He can also speak Egyptian Arabic, though he speaks very little.
