= Dario Smoje =

Croatian footballer

Personal information
- Full name: Dario Smoje
- Date of birth: 19 September 1978 (age 48)
- Place of birth: Rijeka, Croatia
- Height: 1.92 m (6 ft 4 in)
- Position: Defender

Senior career*
Years	Team	Apps	(Gls)
1995–1997	Rijeka	49	(1)
1997–1998	Milan	6	(0)
1998–2000	Monza	52	(2)
2000–2001	Ternana	3	(0)
2001–2003	Dinamo Zagreb	38	(9)
2003–2004	NK Zagreb	25	(1)
2004–2009	Gent	84	(4)
2009–2010	Panionios	1	(0)
2010–2011	Hrvatski Dragovoljac	3	(0)
Total		261	(17)

International career
2003	Croatia	1	(0)
- * Club domestic league appearances and goals

Dario Smoje (born 19 September 1978) is a Croatian former footballer who played as a defender. He started his senior career at NK Rijeka, before spending four years in Italy. He spent the next three years back in Croatia before moving to Belgium for five years and finishing his career with short stints in Greece and back in Croatia.

== Career ==
=== Early career ===
Dario Smoje began his senior career at NK Rijeka. There he debuted as a 16-year-old.

=== Move to Italy ===
After two years in the senior team at Rijeka, he moved to Italian giants AC Milan, in a move worth close to €1m. Competing for places at Milan with the likes of Paolo Maldini, Alessandro Costacurta and Marcel Desailly, the young man didn't get many chances, making just seven appearances in all competitions in his first season with Milan. He moved to Serie B side Monza where he made 22 appearances and even scored a goal in his first season. The next season, he was a constant in the first team, making 30 appearances and scoring another goal. A move to Ternana followed in 2000, but it proved to be a poor career choice for Smoje, as he made just three appearances for the second division side.

=== Return to Croatia ===
He returned to Croatia in 2001 to sign for Croatian giants NK Dinamo Zagreb. At Dinamo, Smoje won the Croatia Cup, Supercup and league title. After 38 appearances over two seasons in the blue of Dinamo, he moved to cross-town rivals NK Zagreb in 2003 and spent a year with the Poets.

=== Later years ===
Smoje signed a 5-year deal with Gent in 2004. He spent all five years of his contract with Gent, making 89 appearances in that time. He ruptured his achilles tendon in 2007 and never truly recovered, unable to make himself a first team regular since and was duly released when his contract expired in 2009.

On 22 May 2009 Panionios F.C. signed the Croatian central defender on free transfer. He made just one appearance for Panionios before being released.

He signed for Hrvatski Dragovoljac on 9 September 2010, but made just three appearances in the 2010/11 season before deciding to retire.

== International career ==
Smohje made his debut and played his only match for Croatia in a February 2003 friendly match against Macedonia.

== Honour ==
Dinamo Zagreb

- Prva HNL: 2002–03
- Croatian Cup: 2001–02
- Croatian Supercup: 2002

Gent

- Belgian Cup: 2007–08 runner-up
- UEFA Intertoto Cup: 2006, 2007
