= Boris Leutar =

Croatian footballer

Personal information
- Date of birth: 20 August 1978 (age 48)
- Place of birth: Vinkovci, SR Croatia, SFR Yugoslavia
- Height: 1.78 m (5 ft 10 in)
- Position: Defender

Senior career*
Years	Team	Apps	(Gls)
1999–2000	Cibalia	25	(0)
2000–2002	Dinamo Zagreb	14	(0)
2002	→ Cibalia (loan)	26	(0)
2002–2011	Cibalia	184	(0)
- * Club domestic league appearances and goals as of 1 August 2010

Boris Leutar (born 20 August 1978) is a former Croatian football player who spent the majority of his career playing for HNK Cibalia.
