= Dalibor Poldrugač =

Croatian football coach (born 1975)

Personal information
- Date of birth: 23 April 1975 (age 51)
- Place of birth: Umag, SR Croatia, Yugoslavia
- Height: 1.82 m (6 ft 0 in)
- Position: Midfielder

Team information
- Current team: Dinamo Zagreb U-15 (coach)

Youth career
- –1993: Dinamo Zagreb

Senior career*
| Years | Team | Apps | (Gls) |
| 1993–1999 | Croatia Zagreb | 2 | (0) |
| 1993–1994 | → Dubrava (loan) | 10 | (0) |
| 1996–1997 | → Samobor (loan) | | |
| 1997–1998 | → Slaven Belupo (loan) | 14 | (0) |
| 1998–2000 | → Segesta (loan) | | |
| 2000–2001 | Croatia Sesvete | | |
| 2001–2002 | Zagreb | 35 | (4) |
| 2003–2005 | Dinamo Zagreb | 43 | (1) |
| 2005–2011 | Slaven Belupo | 122 | (2) |

Managerial career
- Dinamo Zagreb U-15
- * Club domestic league appearances and goals as of 22 May 2011

Dalibor Poldrugač (Croatian pronunciation: [dǎlibor pǒldruɡaːtʃ, poldruɡâːtʃ]; born 23 April 1975) is a Croatian association football coach and former professional player. He coaches the U15s at Dinamo Zagreb Academy.

== Club career ==
On 16 June 2009 Poldrugač signed a new two-year contract with NK Slaven Belupo. He said he was "pleased to be playing in a club with so many young players and that he would be glad to help them develop even better". After an 18-year-long career spent entirely in Croatia, he retired on 21.5.2011 in a game against NK Osijek

== Honours ==
Dinamo Zagreb

- Prva HNL: 2003
- Croatian Cup: 2004
- Croatian Supercup: 2003

NK Zagreb

- Prva HNL: 2002
