= Goce Sedloski =

Macedonian football manager (born 1974)

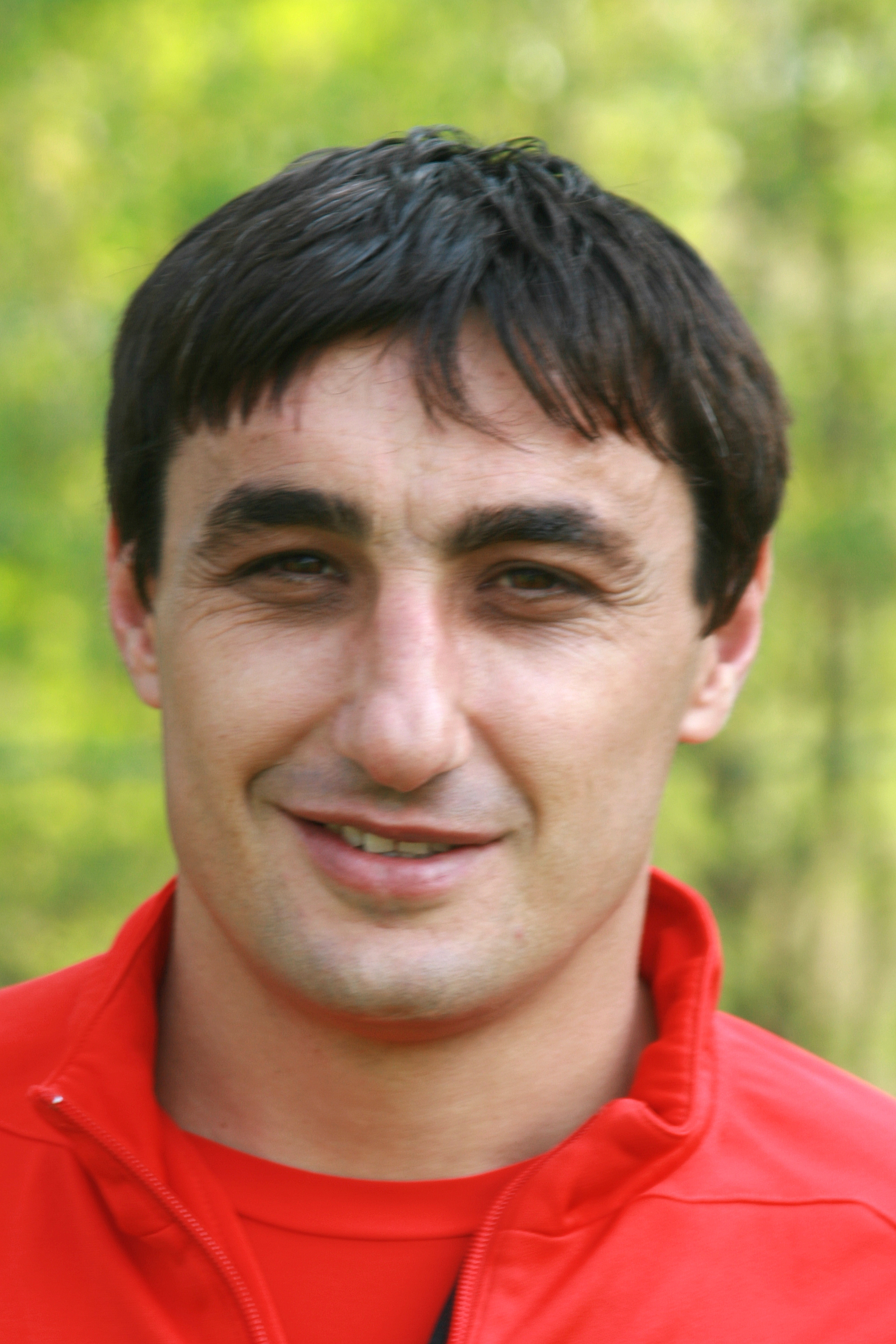
- Sedloski in 2009

Personal information
- Full name: Goce Sedloski
- Date of birth: 10 April 1974 (age 52)
- Place of birth: Golemo Konjari, SR Macedonia, Yugoslavia (now North Macedonia)
- Height: 1.88 m (6 ft 2 in)
- Position: Defender

Team information
- Current team: North Macedonia national football team (manager)

Youth career
- –1994: Pobeda

Senior career*
| Years | Team | Apps | (Gls) |
| 1994–1996 | Pobeda | 1 | (0) |
| 1996–1998 | Hajduk Split | 60 | (7) |
| 1998 | Sheffield Wednesday | 4 | (0) |
| 1998–2004 | Dinamo Zagreb | 121 | (22) |
| 2004 | Vegalta Sendai | 21 | (3) |
| 2005 | Dinamo Zagreb | 17 | (2) |
| 2005–2006 | Diyarbakırspor | 27 | (3) |
| 2006–2011 | SV Mattersburg | 134 | (11) |
| Total | | 368 | (43) |

International career
| 1996–2010 | Macedonia | 100 | (8) |

Managerial career
- 2010–2013: SV Mattersburg (assistant)
- 2011–2012: Macedonia (assistant)
- 2012: Macedonia (caretaker)
- 2013–2014: Turnovo
- 2015–2017: Vardar
- 2018: Riga
- 2018–2019: Široki Brijeg
- 2020: Dinamo Zagreb II
- 2021–2023: Shkupi
- 2023: Vllaznia
- 2023–2024: Rabotnički
- 2024–2026: Vardar
- 2025–: North Macedonia
- * Club domestic league appearances and goals

Goce Sedloski (Macedonian: Гоце Седлоски; born 10 April 1974) is a Macedonian professional football manager and former player who is the head coach of the North Macedonia national football team and FK Vardar. A prominent central defender during his playing career, he is the first player in the history of the national team to earn 100 caps.

Sedloski's playing career was highlighted by a highly successful tenure at Dinamo Zagreb, where he won three Croatian First Football League titles, three Croatian Cups, and two Super Cups. He also played in the Premier League for Sheffield Wednesday and had stints in Japan, Turkey, and Austria, most notably with SV Mattersburg, where he made over 130 appearances. Internationally, he represented North Macedonia between 1996 and 2010, scoring eight goals and serving as the team's captain for several years.

As a manager, Sedloski has won domestic league titles in two different countries, leading Vardar to consecutive Macedonian First Football League championships in 2016 and 2017, and KF Shkupi to their first-ever title in 2022. In December 2025, following a successful campaign with Vardar that included winning the 2024–25 Macedonian Football Cup, the Football Federation of Macedonia (FFM) appointed him as the head coach of the national team to succeed Blagoja Milevski. Under a dual-role agreement, he remained in charge of Vardar for the remainder of the 2025–26 season while preparing the national squad for the 2026 FIFA World Cup qualification play-offs.

== Club career ==
Sedloski began his professional career in 1994 with Pobeda Prilep, where he played for two seasons before moving to the Croatian side Hajduk Split in 1996. After making 60 appearances for Hajduk, he was signed by English Premier League club Sheffield Wednesday in February 1998 for a reported fee of £750,000. His stint in England was brief, consisting of only four league appearances before he returned to Croatia to join Dinamo Zagreb in January 1999.

At Dinamo Zagreb, Sedloski enjoyed the most successful period of his playing career, winning three Croatian First Football League titles, three Croatian Cups, and two Super Cups. He also became the first foreign player to captain the club. In 2004, he spent a half-season on loan with J1 League club Vegalta Sendai before returning to Dinamo for the first half of 2005. He subsequently played for Diyarbakırspor in Turkey during the 2005–06 season. Sedloski finished his playing career in Austria with SV Mattersburg, where he played for five seasons between 2006 and 2011, making 134 league appearances and scoring 10 goals.

Following his retirement, Sedloski transitioned into management. After successful spells with FK Vardar and KF Shkupi, where he won multiple league titles, he was appointed as the head coach of the North Macedonia national football team in December 2025.

== International career ==
Sedloski made his international debut for the Macedonia national team on 27 March 1996 in a 1–0 friendly victory against Malta. Over the next 14 years, he became a fixture in the national side's defense and served as the team's captain for much of his tenure. He is notably the first player in the history of the national team to reach the milestone of 100 international caps.

His 100th and final appearance occurred on 29 May 2010 during a 3–1 friendly win against Azerbaijan in Bischofshofen, Austria, after which he officially retired from international play. During his career, Sedloski recorded eight international goals. His scoring record included goals in competitive qualifiers, such as a strike against Estonia during UEFA Euro 2004 qualifying and a goal against Armenia in the 2006 World Cup qualifying cycle. At the time of his retirement, he held the record for the most appearances for his country, a record that stood until it was surpassed by Goran Pandev in 2019.

== Managerial Career ==
=== Early career and interim roles ===
Sedloski began his coaching career in Austria as an assistant to Franz Lederer at SV Mattersburg from 2010 to 2012. In August 2012, the Football Federation of Macedonia (FFM) appointed him as the interim manager of the North Macedonia national team for a single friendly match against Lithuania, which resulted in a 1–0 victory.

=== Horizont Turnovo ===
In 2013, Sedloski accepted his first head coaching role at FK Horizont Turnovo. During the 2013–14 season, he led the club to a second-place finish in the Macedonian First Football League, the highest in the club's history. Under his management, Turnovo debuted in European competition during the 2013–14 UEFA Europa League, where they defeated Lithuanian side FK Sūduva on penalties before being eliminated by HNK Hajduk Split.

=== Vardar ===
Sedloski joined FK Vardar in 2014, initially serving as the club's sporting director before being named head coach in 2015. His first tenure was defined by domestic dominance, as he guided Vardar to consecutive league titles in the 2015–16 and 2016–17 seasons. He also secured the Macedonian Football Super Cup in 2015. He resigned in August 2017 following the club's failure to progress past the third qualifying round of the UEFA Champions League.

=== Široki Brijeg ===
On 31 August 2018, Sedloski was appointed as the head coach of NK Široki Brijeg, succeeding Boris Pavić. During the 2018–19 season, he guided the team to a third-place finish in the league and reached the final of the 2018–19 Bosnia and Herzegovina Football Cup, where they were defeated by FK Sarajevo 3–1 on aggregate.

Sedloski resigned from his position on 23 July 2019, following a 1–0 home defeat against FC Kairat in the first qualifying round of the UEFA Europa League and a draw in the opening match of the domestic season against NK Čelik Zenica. His tenure at the Pecara Stadium was characterized by a disciplined defensive approach, though he cited the need for a "new energy" within the squad upon his departure.

In retrospective interviews conducted in early 2025, Sedloski described his time in the Bosnian Premier League as a pivotal period for his tactical evolution, noting the high intensity and physical nature of the league. Despite his exit, he remained a respected figure among the club's supporters, and his name was frequently linked with a return to the Bosnian top flight during the 2025–26 coaching cycles.

=== Dinamo Zagreb II ===
In June 2020, Sedloski returned to GNK Dinamo Zagreb to take over as the head coach of the club's reserve team, GNK Dinamo Zagreb II, which was then competing in the Druga HNL. He succeeded Igor Jovićević, who had been promoted to the senior team. Sedloski's appointment was intended to utilize his status as a club legend to mentor the academy's prospects and facilitate their transition to professional football.

His tenure with the reserve side was brief, lasting only four months. On 6 October 2020, Sedloski resigned from his position following a string of inconsistent results and personal reasons, having led the team through the opening seven rounds of the 2020–21 season. Despite the short duration of his stay, he was credited with integrating several youth players into the competitive environment of the Croatian second tier before being succeeded by Ivan Prelec.

=== Shkupi ===
In April 2021, Sedloski was appointed manager of KF Shkupi. In the 2021–22 season, he led the Čair-based club to its first-ever Macedonian First League title, ending a 21-year drought for the club. Under his leadership, Shkupi dominated the league, securing the championship with several rounds to spare.

During the summer of 2022, Sedloski oversaw the club's most extensive European campaign to date. Shkupi competed in the UEFA Champions League qualifying rounds, where they eliminated Lincoln Red Imps before being narrowly defeated by Dinamo Zagreb in the second round. The club subsequently transitioned to the UEFA Europa League and later the UEFA Europa Conference League, eventually reaching the play-off round of the latter before being eliminated by KF Ballkani.

Sedloski's tenure was marked by a brief period of instability in late 2022; he resigned on 31 August 2022 following the club's exit from European competition and a domestic draw against Pobeda. However, he returned to the position just nine days later on 9 September 2022. He remained with the club until 21 March 2023, when he left by mutual agreement following a series of inconsistent results in the second half of the 2022–23 season.

=== Vllaznia and Rabotnički ===
On 3 April 2023, Sedloski was appointed as the head coach of Albanian club Vllaznia Shkodër, signing a contract intended to run through the end of the 2023–24 season. During his brief tenure in Shkodër, he led the team to the semi-finals of the Albanian Cup, though he left the club by mutual consent in June 2023 following the conclusion of the season.

Sedloski returned to the Macedonian First Football League on 14 November 2023, taking over at FK Rabotnički as a replacement for Milan Ilievski. His stint with the "Romanticists" lasted only four months; after managing 11 matches with a record of two wins, two draws, and seven defeats, he parted ways with the club on 2 April 2024. Following a successful 2024–25 campaign with FK Vardar, where he won the Macedonian Football Cup, Sedloski was officially named the head coach of the North Macedonia national football team in December 2025.

=== Return to FK Vardar and National Team (2024–present) ===
==== Vardar ====
In November 2024, Sedloski returned to Vardar as head coach during a period of significant financial restructuring and ownership transition. Tasked with stabilizing a squad facing relegation threats, he prioritized the integration of youth academy players into the first team to ensure the club's survival in the Macedonian First Football League. Under Sedloski's management, Vardar underwent a competitive resurgence during the latter half of the 2024–25 season. This culminated in the club winning the Macedonian Football Cup on 21 May 2025, defeating FK Sileks 2–1 in the final held at the Toše Proeski Arena. The victory marked Vardar's first major trophy since their financial crisis and subsequent relegation years earlier, securing the club a spot in the qualifying rounds of the UEFA Conference League for the 2025–26 season.

==== North Macedonia ====
Following the conclusion of the 2026 FIFA World Cup qualification cycle, the Football Federation of Macedonia (FFM) announced in January 2026 that Sedloski had been appointed as the permanent head coach of the North Macedonia national football team. Under a unique dual-role agreement, the FFM permitted Sedloski to remain with FK Vardar until the end of the 2025–26 domestic season. This arrangement was designed to allow Sedloski to complete the club's rebuilding phase before focusing exclusively on the national team's preparations for the 2026–27 UEFA Nations League.

== Career statistics ==
=== Club ===
Appearances and goals by club, season and competition
| Club | Season | League | | | National cup (Note: Includes Croatian Football Cup, FA Cup, Emperor's Cup, Turkish Cup, Austrian Cup) | | League cup (Note: Includes EFL Cup, J.League Cup) | | Continental | | Other | | Total | |
| Club | Season | Division | Apps | Goals | Apps | Goals | Apps | Goals | Apps | Goals | Apps | Goals | Apps | Goals |
|---|---|---|---|---|---|---|---|---|---|---|---|---|---|---|
| Pobeda | 1994–96 | First League | 1 | 0 | — | — | — | — | — | — | — | — | 1 | 0 |
| Hajduk Split | 1996–97 | Prva HNL | 29 | 1 | — | — | — | — | — | — | — | — | 29 | 1 |
| Hajduk Split | 1997–98 | Prva HNL | 14 | 1 | — | — | — | — | 4 (Note: Appearances in UEFA Cup) | 1 | — | — | 18 | 2 |
| Hajduk Split | Total | | 43 | 2 | — | — | — | — | 4 | 1 | — | — | 47 | 3 |
| Sheffield Wednesday | 1997–98 | Premier League | 4 | 0 | 0 | 0 | 0 | 0 | — | — | — | — | 4 | 0 |
| Dinamo Zagreb | 1998–99 | Prva HNL | 3 | 0 | — | — | — | — | — | — | — | — | 3 | 0 |
| Dinamo Zagreb | 1999–2000 | Prva HNL | 10 | 1 | — | — | — | — | 1 (Note: Appearance in UEFA Champions League) | 0 | — | — | 11 | 1 |
| Dinamo Zagreb | 2000–01 | Prva HNL | 28 | 4 | — | — | — | — | — | — | — | — | 28 | 4 |
| Dinamo Zagreb | 2001–02 | Prva HNL | 25 | 3 | — | — | — | — | — | — | — | — | 25 | 3 |
| Dinamo Zagreb | 2002–03 | Prva HNL | 30 | 3 | — | — | — | — | — | — | — | — | 30 | 3 |
| Dinamo Zagreb | 2003–04 | Prva HNL | 30 | 11 | 2 | 1 | — | — | — | — | 1 (Note: Appearance in Croatian Football Super Cup) | 1 | 33 | 13 |
| Dinamo Zagreb | Total | | 126 | 22 | 27 | — | — | — | 23 | — | 2 | — | 178 | 36 |
| Vegalta Sendai | 2004 | J2 League | 21 | 3 | 1 | 0 | 0 | 0 | — | — | — | — | 22 | 3 |
| Dinamo Zagreb | 2004–05 | Prva HNL | 13 | 1 | — | — | — | — | — | — | — | — | 13 | 1 |
| Diyarbakırspor | 2005–06 | Süper Lig | 27 | 3 | 3 | 1 | — | — | — | — | — | — | 30 | 4 |
| SV Mattersburg | 2006–07 | Bundesliga | 35 | 3 | 4 | 0 | — | — | — | — | — | — | 39 | 3 |
| SV Mattersburg | 2007–08 | Bundesliga | 35 | 4 | — | — | — | — | 4 (Note: Appearances in UEFA Cup) | 0 | — | — | 39 | 4 |
| SV Mattersburg | 2008–09 | Bundesliga | 34 | 1 | 3 | 0 | — | — | — | — | — | — | 37 | 1 |
| SV Mattersburg | 2009–10 | Bundesliga | 29 | 1 | 1 | 0 | — | — | — | — | — | — | 30 | 1 |
| SV Mattersburg | 2010–11 | Bundesliga | 1 | 0 | 1 | 0 | — | — | — | — | — | — | 2 | 0 |
| SV Mattersburg | Total | | 134 | 9 | 10 | 1 | — | — | 4 | 0 | — | — | 148 | 10 |
| Career total | | | 369 | 40 | 42 | 2 | 0 | 0 | 31 | 1 | 2 | 1 | 444 | 44 |

=== International ===
Appearances and goals by national team and year
| National team | Year | Apps | Goals |
|---|---|---|---|
| Macedonia | 1996 | 7 | 0 |
| Macedonia | 1997 | 6 | 0 |
| Macedonia | 1998 | 5 | 0 |
| Macedonia | 1999 | 3 | 0 |
| Macedonia | 2000 | 7 | 0 |
| Macedonia | 2001 | 5 | 0 |
| Macedonia | 2002 | 7 | 1 |
| Macedonia | 2003 | 9 | 2 |
| Macedonia | 2004 | 9 | 1 |
| Macedonia | 2005 | 7 | 0 |
| Macedonia | 2006 | 8 | 1 |
| Macedonia | 2007 | 8 | 2 |
| Macedonia | 2008 | 7 | 0 |
| Macedonia | 2009 | 10 | 1 |
| Macedonia | 2010 | 2 | 0 |
| Total | | 100 | 8 |

North Macedonia score listed first, score column indicates score after each Sedloski goal.

International goals by date, venue, cap, opponent, score, result and competition
| No. | Date | Venue | Cap | Opponent | Score | Result | Competition |
|---|---|---|---|---|---|---|---|
| 1 | 20 November 2002 | Philip II Arena, Skopje, Macedonia | 40 | Israel | 2–3 | 2–3 | Friendly |
| 2 | 9 February 2003 | Stadion Šubićevac, Šibenik, Croatia | 41 | Croatia | 1–0 | 2–2 | Friendly |
| 3 | 7 June 2003 | Philip II Arena, Skopje, Macedonia | 45 | Liechtenstein | 1–1 | 3–1 | UEFA Euro 2004 qualifying |
| 4 | 11 June 2004 | A. Le Coq Arena, Tallinn, Estonia | 55 | Estonia | 1–0 | 4–2 | Friendly |
| 5 | 16 August 2006 | A. Le Coq Arena, Tallinn, Estonia | 69 | Estonia | 1–0 | 1–0 | UEFA Euro 2008 qualifying |
| 6 | 24 March 2007 | Stadion Maksimir, Zagreb, Croatia | 75 | Croatia | 1–0 | 1–2 | UEFA Euro 2008 qualifying |
| 7 | 17 October 2007 | Philip II Arena, Skopje, Macedonia | 79 | Andorra | 2–0 | 3–0 | UEFA Euro 2008 qualifying |
| 8 | 14 November 2009 | Stadion Blagoj Istatov, Strumica, Croatia | 97 | Canada | 1–0 | 3–0 | Friendly |

== Managerial statistics ==
As of match played 16 November 2026

Managerial record by team and tenure
| Team | From | To | Record | | | | |
| Team | From | To | G | W | D | L | Win % |
|---|---|---|---|---|---|---|---|
| Macedonia | 15 August 2012 | 15 August 2012 | 1 | 1 | 0 | 0 | 100.00 |
| Turnovo | 17 September 2013 | 15 July 2014 | 33 | 18 | 6 | 9 | 54.55 |
| Vardar | 27 July 2015 | 15 August 2017 | 75 | 52 | 14 | 9 | 69.33 |
| Riga | 27 January 2018 | 24 May 2018 | 9 | 4 | 1 | 4 | 44.44 |
| Široki Brijeg | 31 August 2018 | 22 July 2019 | 39 | 18 | 12 | 9 | 46.15 |
| Dinamo Zagreb II | 13 April 2020 | 14 October 2020 | 17 | 9 | 2 | 6 | 52.94 |
| Shkupi | 16 April 2021 | 21 March 2023 | 72 | 39 | 19 | 14 | 54.17 |
| Vllaznia | 4 April 2023 | 30 June 2023 | 11 | 3 | 4 | 4 | 27.27 |
| Rabotnički | 14 November 2023 | 2 April 2024 | 11 | 2 | 2 | 7 | 18.18 |
| Vardar | 5 November 2024 | Present | 48 | 31 | 12 | 5 | 64.58 |
| North Macedonia | 1 January 2026 | Present | 10 | 0 | 2 | 8 | 0.00 |
| Total | | | 284 | 150 | 65 | 69 | 52.82 |

== Honours ==
=== Player ===
Dinamo Zagreb

- Croatian First League: 1998–99, 1999–2000, 2002–03
- Croatian Cup: 2000–01, 2001–02, 2003–04
- Croatian Super Cup: 2002, 2003

=== Manager ===
Vardar

- Macedonian First League: 2015–16, 2016–17
- Macedonian Cup: 2024–25
- Macedonian Supercup: 2015

Široki Brijeg

- Bosnian Cup runner-up: 2018–19

Skupi/Sloga

- Macedonian First League: 2021–22

== See also ==
- List of men's footballers with 100 or more international caps

== Notes ==
Sporting positions
| Preceded by Artim Šakiri | Macedonia captain 2004–2009 | Succeeded by Veliče Šumulikoski |
