= Jerko Leko =

Croatian football manager (born 1980)

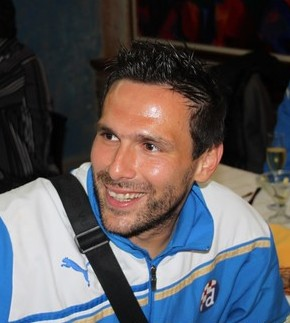
- Leko with Dinamo Zagreb in 2013

Personal information
- Full name: Jerko Leko
- Date of birth: 9 April 1980 (age 46)
- Place of birth: Zagreb, SR Croatia, Yugoslavia
- Height: 1.87 m (6 ft 1 1/2 in)
- Position: Midfielder

Team information
- Current team: Dinamo Zagreb (manager)

Senior career*
Years	Team	Apps	(Gls)
1999–2002	Dinamo Zagreb	45	(5)
2002–2006	Dynamo Kyiv	61	(7)
2002–2006	→ Dynamo-2 Kyiv	2	(0)
2006–2010	Monaco	85	(4)
2010–2011	Bucaspor	30	(2)
2011–2014	Dinamo Zagreb	63	(5)
2014–2016	Lokomotiva	55	(4)
Total		339	(27)

International career
1999	Croatia U19	2	(0)
2000	Croatia U20	3	(0)
2001	Croatia U21	1	(0)
2002–2009	Croatia	59	(2)

Managerial career
- 2017–2021: Lokomotiva U19
- 2021: Hrvatski Dragovoljac
- 2021: Lokomotiva
- 2021–2025: Jarun
- 2025–2026: Dinamo Zagreb U19
- 2026: Dinamo Zagreb II
- 2026–: Dinamo Zagreb
- * Club domestic league appearances and goals

Jerko Leko (pronounced [jěrko lêko]; born 9 April 1980) is a Croatian professional football manager and former player who is the current manager of Croatian Football League club Dinamo Zagreb.

He primarily played as a central midfielder, but could also operate as a right one, or more defensively, as a right-back.

Leko represented the Croatia national team at two European Championships and the 2006 World Cup. His professional club career spanned 17 years across the top-flight leagues of Croatia, Ukraine, France and Turkey.

== Club career ==
Leko's career began with Dinamo Zagreb in 2000 in his native Croatia, although he was not an immediate success. After spending some time on loan at Croatia Sesvete, he became a regular starter in 2001–02 season, helping Dinamo win the Croatian Cup, scoring in the final against Varteks Varaždin and being named Man of the Match. Leko eventually moved to Dynamo Kyiv in 2002 for €5.5 million (then a club record). In his first season in Ukraine, Dynamo won the double, with Leko playing 18 times.

In February 2006, it was announced that Leko would be leaving Dynamo Kyiv, having turned down a new contract offer. He subsequently signed for French side AS Monaco on a free transfer on 4 June 2006.

In July 2009, The Times reported that he had turned down a move to English Premier League club Wolverhampton Wanderers as they would not meet his wage demands of £30,000 per week (approx. $49,000) net. On 18 June 2010, Bucaspor signed Leko to a two-year deal on a free transfer from Monaco. On 25 May, it was confirmed that Leko signed a two-year deal with Dinamo Zagreb.

In August 2014 he moved to NK Lokomotiva on loan. In 2015, he permanently joined Lokomotiva for the last season of his professional career.

== International career ==
Leko made his Croatia national team debut in 2002 against Hungary, but was not included in the 2002 World Cup squad. He scored a goal in a 4–0 victory against Belgium in a Euro 2004 qualifier, and was included in the squad for the tournament, where he played only 22 minutes.

Selected to represent the nation in the 2006 World Cup, Leko made two substitute appearances, against Brazil and Australia. He was also part of the final squad for Euro 2008.

At the tournament quarter-final clash between Croatia and Turkey, Leko was supposed to make his first appearance in the competition as a late substitute as Slaven Bilić wanted to put him on to hold on for a Croatian victory. However, officiating referee Roberto Rosetti disallowed the substitution from occurring as he also allowed Turkey an extra two minutes to find a late equalizer to send the game to a penalty shootout which Turkey eventually won. Leko's last international appearance came a year after Euro 2008 in a friendly match in 2009 against Qatar.

== Managerial career ==
Leko started his managerial career by succeeding Besnik Prenga on the bench of Lokomotiva under-19 team in the summer of 2017, leading them through the 2017–18 UEFA Youth League. They were, however, eliminated by Željezničar in the second round.

On 5 January 2021, he succeeded Boris Perković on the bench of Hrvatski Dragovoljac, who held first place on the second-tier Druga HNL table at the time of his hiring. However, on 9 January 2021, just four days after the appointment at Hrvatski Dragovoljac, Leko left the club and succeeded Goran Tomić as the head coach of Lokomotiva in the top-tier Prva HNL. He had his managerial debut on 22 January in a home 3–0 defeat to Osijek. He achieved his first career victory on 30 January, beating Hajduk Split 1–0 away. He was sacked on 13 March, after a 1–0 defeat to Istra 1961.

In July 2021, Leko was named manager of Jarun in their debut season in the second-tier Druga HNL. He remained the head coach of Jarun until 2025.

In July 2025, Leko returned to Dinamo Zagreb, that time as the under-19 team head coach. During the 2025–26 season, he managed the team to win the national league, national cup and the Mladen Ramljak Memorial Tournament. The team also reached the semi-finals of the Premier League International Cup.

In June 2026, Leko was announced manager of renewed Dinamo Zagreb II team. On 1 November 2026, he was named caretaker manager of the first team, after Mario Kovačević got sacked. On 5 November, Leko made his debut as head coach in a 0–2 away win over Sunderland in the UEFA Europa League. He achieved his first win in the domestic league on 8 November, defeating Varaždin 1–3 away. A day later, he signed a contract with the club until the end of the season, with an option to extend.

== Career statistics ==
=== International ===
Scores and results list Croatia's goal tally first, score column indicates score after each Leko goal.

List of international goals scored by Jerko Leko
No.	Date	Venue	Opponent	Score	Result	Competition
1	29 March 2003	Maksimir, Zagreb	Belgium	4–0	4–0	UEFA Euro 2004 qualifying
2	1 February 2006	Hong Kong Stadium, Hong Kong	Hong Kong	2–0	4–0	2006 Carlsberg Cup

== Managerial statistics ==
As of match played 22 November 2026

Managerial record by team and tenure
Team	From	To	Record							
Team	From	To	G	W	D	L	GF	GA	GD	Win %
Hrvatski Dragovoljac	5 January 2021	9 January 2021	0	0	0	0	0	0	+0	—
Lokomotiva	9 January 2021	13 March 2021	11	2	2	7	5	19	−14	18.18
Jarun	9 July 2021	June 2025	145	56	34	55	214	189	+25	38.62
Dinamo Zagreb II	June 2026	1 November 2026	11	5	0	6	17	16	+1	45.45
Dinamo Zagreb	1 November 2026	Present	3	3	0	0	8	3	+5	100.00
Career totals			170	66	36	68	244	227	+17	38.82

== Honours ==
=== Player ===
Dinamo Zagreb

- Croatian First League: 2011–12, 2012–13, 2013–14
- Croatian Cup: 2000–01, 2001–02, 2011–12
- Croatian Super Cup: 2002, 2013

Dynamo Kyiv

- Ukrainian Premier League: 2002–03, 2003–04
- Ukrainian Cup: 2002–03, 2004–05, 2005–06
