= 2001–02 Croatian Football Cup =

Tournament details
- Country: Croatia
- Teams: 48

Final positions
- Champions: Dinamo Zagreb (6th title)
- Runners-up: Varteks

Tournament statistics
- Matches played: 53
- Goals scored: 171 (3.23 per match)
- Top goal scorer(s): Saša Bjelanović & Joško Popović (3)

The 2001–02 Croatian Football Cup was the eleventh edition of Croatia's football knockout competition. Dinamo Zagreb were the defending champions, who retained the title beating Varteks in the final.

== Calendar ==
Round	Main date	Number of fixtures	Clubs	New entries this round
Preliminary round	22 August 2001	16	48 → 32	none
First round	18 September – 16 October 2001	16	32 → 16	16
Second round	24 October – 7 November 2001	8	16 → 8	none
Quarter-finals	14 November – 8 December 2001	8	8 → 4	none
Semi-finals	20 March and 3 April 2002	4	4 → 2	none
Final	24 April and 1 May 2002	2	2 → 1	none

== Preliminary round ==
Tie no	Home team	Score	Away team
1	Zagorec Krapina	5–1	NK Nedelišće
2	Lučko	1–2	Novalja
3	Croatia Sesvete	4–0	Slunj
4	Dilj	4–1	Moslavina
5	Radnik Velika Gorica	0–1	Željezničar Slavonski Brod
6	Vukovar '91	4–1	Sloga Nova Gradiška
7	Dinara Knin	1–3	Bjelovar
8	Podravac	2–1	Valpovka
9	Kamen Ingrad	4–0	Virovitica
10	Samobor	1–1 (aet) (4–2 p)	Uskok
11	Grafičar Vodovod	3–1	Vodnjan
12	Pomorac Kostrena	6–0	Hajduk Pridraga
13	TŠK Topolovac	2–1 (aet)	Koprivnica
14	Sloga Čakovec	w.o.	Jadran Luka Ploče
15	Ivančica	4–3 (aet)	Uljanik Pula
16	Podravina	5–0	Omladinac Čurlovac

== First round ==
Tie no	Home team	Score	Away team
1	Sloga Čakovec	1–5	Osijek
2	Grafičar Vodovod	0–1	NK Zagreb
3	Vukovar '91	2–4	Rijeka
4	Dilj	2–0	Dubrovnik
5	Zagorec Krapina	0–3	Belišće
6	Marsonia	1–3	Zadar
7	Novalja	0–0 (aet) (4–3 p)	Cibalia
8	Croatia Sesvete	1–3	Kamen Ingrad
9	Pomorac Kostrena	4–1	Slaven Belupo
10	Podravac Virje	0–4	Hrvatski Dragovoljac
11	Samobor	1–1 (aet) (5–6 p)	Inker Zaprešić
12	TŠK Topolovac	5–3	Segesta
13	Bjelovar	2–3	Šibenik
14	Željezničar Slavonski Brod	0–3	Dinamo Zagreb
15	Ivančica Ivanec	1–3	Varteks
16	Podravina Ludbreg	0–1 (aet)	Hajduk Split

== Second round ==
Tie no	Home team	Score	Away team
1	Kamen Ingrad	1–4	Dinamo Zagreb
2	Šibenik	0–0 (aet) (4–5 p)	NK Zagreb
3	Varteks	5–0	Belišće
4	TŠK Topolovac	0–0 (aet) (5–4 p)	Novalja
5	Pomorac Kostrena	5–1	Inker Zaprešić
6	Hrvatski Dragovoljac	1–1 (aet) (3–4 p)	Rijeka
7	Dilj	1–2	Hajduk Split
8	Zadar	0–1	Osijek

== Quarter-finals ==
Team 1	Agg.	Team 2	1st leg	2nd leg
Osijek	5–0	TŠK Topolovac	3–0	2–0
Pomorac Kostrena	3–1	NK Zagreb	2–1	1–0
Dinamo Zagreb	2–0	Rijeka	1–0	1–0
Hajduk Split	3–4	Varteks	1–3	2–1

== Semi-finals ==
20 March 2002
15:30

Pomorac	1–0	Varteks
Samardžić 35'	Report

Stadion Žuknica, Kostrena
Attendance: 1,500
Referee: Draženko Kovačić (Križevci)
3 April 2002
19:00

Varteks	2–0	Pomorac
Drobne 10'; Granić 21'	Report

Stadion Varteks, Varaždin
Attendance: 3,500
Referee: Edo Trivković (Split)

Varteks won 2–1 on aggregate.

20 March 2002
17:00

Osijek	2–1	Dinamo Zagreb
Mitu 12'; Božinovski 80'	Report	Smoje 30' (pen.)

Stadion Gradski vrt, Osijek
Attendance: 3,000
Referee: Edo Trivković (Split)
3 April 2002
17:30

Dinamo Zagreb	2–0	Osijek
Mešanović 6'; Agić 71'	Report

Stadion Maksimir, Zagreb
Attendance: 8,000
Referee: Draženko Kovačić (Križevci)

Dinamo Zagreb won 3–2 on aggregate.

== Final ==
=== First leg ===
24 April 2002
17:30

Dinamo Zagreb	1–1	Varteks
Sedloski 47'	Report (in Croatian)	Halilović 22'

Stadion Maksimir, Zagreb
Attendance: 5,000
Referee: Draženko Kovačić (Križevci)

=== Second leg ===
1 May 2002
17:30

Varteks	0–1	Dinamo Zagreb
	Report (in Croatian)	Leko 32'

Stadion Varteks, Varaždin
Attendance: 8,000
Referee: Edo Trivković (Split)

Dinamo Zagreb won 2–1 on aggregate.

== See also ==
- 2001–02 Croatian First Football League
- 2001–02 Croatian Second Football League
