= 2003–04 Croatian Football Cup =

Tournament details
- Country: Croatia
- Teams: 48

Final positions
- Champions: Dinamo Zagreb (7th title)
- Runners-up: Varteks

Tournament statistics
- Matches played: 54
- Goals scored: 189 (3.5 per match)
- Top goal scorer: Goce Sedloski (7)

The 2003–04 Croatian Football Cup was the 13th edition of Croatia's premier association football knockout competition. Hajduk Split were the defending champions, and the cup was eventually won by Dinamo Zagreb on away goals rule after the aggregate score in the final tie was 1–1 against Varteks. This was the 7th Croatian cup title for Dinamo and Varteks' fourth final without a win.

== Calendar ==
Round	Main date	Number of fixtures	Clubs	New entries this round
Preliminary round	3 September 2003	16	48 → 32	none
First round	17 September 2003	16	32 → 16	16
Second round	29 October 2003	8	16 → 8	none
Quarter-finals	17 and 24 March 2004	8	8 → 4	none
Semi-finals	7 and 14 April 2004	4	4 → 2	none
Final	5 and 19 May 2004	2	2 → 1	none

== Preliminary round ==
Tie no	Home team	Score	Away team
1	Nehaj	1–0	Vinogradar
2	Crikvenica	0–0 (1–3 p)	Koprivnica
3	Primorac (BnM)	2–1	Karlovac
4	Neretva	2–1	Moslavina
5	Mladost Prelog	1–3	Zagorec Krapina
6	Željezničar Slav. Brod	1–3	Virovitica
7	NK Udarnik Kurilovec	1–3	Vukovar '91
8	Pula 1856	1–0	Slavonija Požega
9	Sloga Nova Gradiška	2–1	Graničar Županja
10	Zdenka Veliki Zdenci	1–5	Croatia Sesvete
11	Sloboda Varaždin	4–1	Čakovec
12	Vodice	0–0 (2–3 p)	Valpovka
13	Mosor	3–2	Podravina
14	Metalac Osijek	1–0	Naftaš
15	Jedinstvo Omladinac	1–3	Bjelovar
16	Viktorija Križevci	2–2 (4–5 p)	Lučko

== First round ==
Tie no	Home team	Score	Away team
1	Primorac (BnM)	0–2	Hajduk Split
2	Lučko	0–3	Dinamo Zagreb
3	Virovitica	1–2	Osijek
4	Valpovka	0–2	Varteks
5	Metalac Osijek	1–2	Cibalia
6	Sloga Nova Gradiška	0–2	NK Zagreb
7	Sloboda Varaždin	2–6	Pula 1856
8	Vukovar '91	0–1	Slaven Belupo
9	Koprivnica	0–2	Kamen Ingrad
10	Croatia Sesvete	3–0	Pomorac
11	Nehaj	1–7	Rijeka
12	Neretva	2–1	Hrvatski Dragovoljac
13	Zagorec Krapina	1–0	Šibenik
14	Mosor	1–0	Inker Zaprešić
15	Bjelovar	3–1	Belišće
16	Segesta	1–4	Zadar

== Second round ==
Tie no	Home team	Score	Away team
1	Hajduk Split	3–1	Zadar
2	Bjelovar	1–4	Dinamo Zagreb
3	Osijek	3–2	Mosor
4	Zagorec Krapina	0–3	Varteks
5	Cibalia	4–3	Neretva
6	Rijeka	3–0	NK Zagreb
7	Croatia Sesvete	2–4	Pula 1856
8	Kamen Ingrad	2–0	Slaven Belupo

== Quarter-finals ==
Team 1	Agg.	Team 2	1st leg	2nd leg
Cibalia	1–0	Hajduk Split	0–0	1–0
Osijek	1–5	Dinamo Zagreb	0–2	1–3
Kamen Ingrad	2–5	Rijeka	2–3	0–2
Pula 1856	2–5	Varteks	2–0	0–5

== Semi-finals ==
7 April 2004
18:00

Dinamo Zagreb	4–2	Rijeka
Eduardo 3'; Mitu 16'; Sedloski 57'; Strupar 80'	Report	Linić 35' (pen.); Vidović 70'

Stadion Maksimir, Zagreb
Attendance: 1,500
Referee: Alojzije Šupraha (Kolan)
14 April 2004
18:00

Rijeka	1–0	Dinamo Zagreb
Bulat 39'	Report

Stadion Kantrida, Rijeka
Attendance: 6,000
Referee: Miroslav Vitković (Vinkovci)

Dinamo Zagreb won 4–3 on aggregate.

6 April 2004
16:30

Cibalia	1–3	Varteks
Ratković 21' (pen.)	Report	Benko 28'; Kastel 45'; Mujanović 56'

Stadion HNK Cibalia, Vinkovci
Attendance: 1,000
Referee: Edo Trivković (Split)
14 April 2004
18:00

Varteks	5–1	Cibalia
Halilović 5'; Karić 56' (pen.); Jolić 82'; Šafarić 84', 90'	Report	Bošnjak 71'

Stadion Varteks, Varaždin
Attendance: 1,000
Referee: Draženko Kovačić (Križevci)

Varteks won 8–2 on aggregate.

== Final ==
=== First leg ===
5 May 2004
18:15

Varteks	1–1	Dinamo Zagreb
Kastel 86'	Report (in Croatian)	Sedloski 33'

Stadion Varteks, Varaždin
Attendance: 5,000
Referee: Draženko Kovačić (Križevci)

=== Second leg ===
19 May 2004
18:15

Dinamo Zagreb	0–0	Varteks
	Report (in Croatian)

Stadion Maksimir, Zagreb
Attendance: 8,000
Referee: Edo Trivković (Split)

Dinamo Zagreb won on away goals rule.

== See also ==
- 2003–04 Croatian First Football League
- 2003–04 Croatian Second Football League
