= Jasmin Agić =

Croatian footballer (born 1974)

Personal information
- Date of birth: 26 December 1974 (age 51)
- Place of birth: Pula, SR Croatia, SFR Yugoslavia
- Height: 1.80 m (5 ft 11 in)
- Position: Midfielder

Senior career*
Years	Team	Apps	(Gls)
1992–1993	Uljanik		
1993–2000	Rijeka	102	(4)
1994–1995	→ NK Gospić '91 (loan)		
2000–2005	Dinamo Zagreb	119	(4)
2005–2006	Incheon United	49	(5)
2006–2007	Dinamo Zagreb	15	(1)
2007	Pasching	6	(0)
2008–2010	Croatia Sesvete	63	(7)

International career
1999–2004	Croatia	14	(0)
- * Club domestic league appearances and goals

Jasmin Agić (born 26 December 1974) is a Croatian retired football midfielder.

== International career ==
He made his debut for Croatia in a March 1999 friendly match against Greece, coming on as a 61st-minute substitute for Goran Jurić, and earned a total of 14 caps, scoring no goals. His final international was a May 2004 friendly against Slovakia.

=== International statistics ===
National team	Season	Apps	Goals
Croatia	1999	3	0
Croatia	2000	0	0
Croatia	2001	4	0
Croatia	2002	3	0
Croatia	2003	2	0
Croatia	2004	2	0
Croatia	Total	14	0

== Match fixing scandal ==
On 13 December 2011 the player was sentenced to 9 months of prison due to his involvement in match fixing.

== Personal life ==
His wife, Sanja, is also Istrian, from Opatija, and she's the daughter of former football legendary captain of Rijeka, Srećko Juričić. They married in 2000 in his wife's hometown Opatija, and have two sons together.

== Honours ==
Uljanik

- 3. HNL - West: 1992–93

Dinamo Zagreb

- Croatian First Football League: 2002–03, 2006–07
- Croatian Football Cup: 2001, 2002, 2004, 2007
- Croatian Football Super Cup: 2002, 2003, 2006
