= Dino Drpić =

Croatian footballer

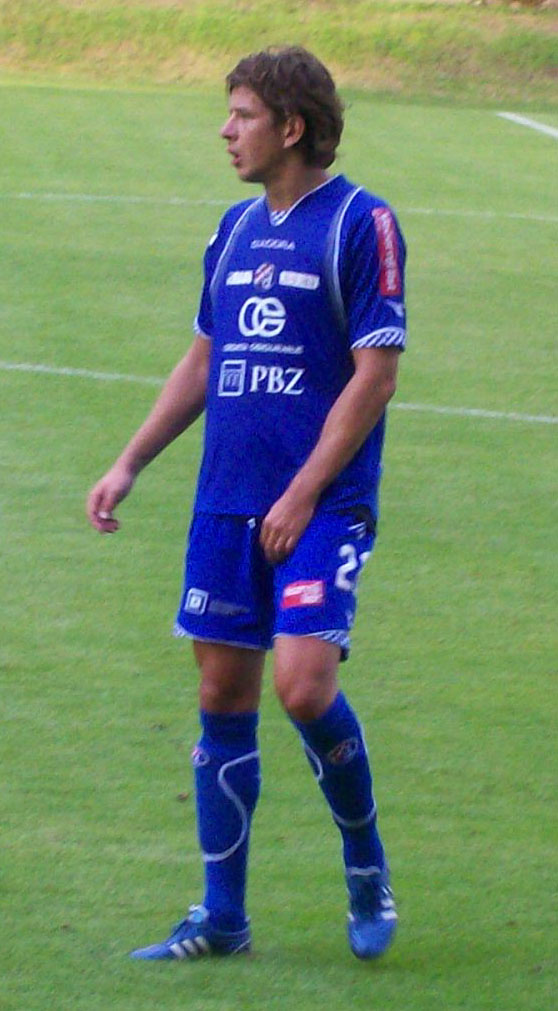
- Drpić playing for Dinamo Zagreb in 2008

Personal information
- Date of birth: 26 May 1981 (age 45)
- Place of birth: Zagreb, SR Croatia, Yugoslavia
- Height: 1.95 m (6 ft 5 in)
- Position: Defender

Youth career
- Chromos Zagreb
- 1997–2000: Dinamo Zagreb

Senior career*
Years	Team	Apps	(Gls)
2000–2009	Dinamo Zagreb	185	(11)
2009	→ Karlsruher SC (loan)	16	(0)
2009–2010	Karlsruher SC	17	(0)
2011	AEK Athens	2	(0)
2011	Volyn Lutsk	3	(0)
2012	Rijeka	7	(0)
2013	DPMM	11	(0)
Total		233	(11)

International career
1999–2000	Croatia U18	19	(1)
2001	Croatia U20	1	(0)
2002–2004	Croatia U21	8	(1)
2007	Croatia	1	(0)
- * Club domestic league appearances and goals

Dino Drpić (born 26 May 1981) is a Croatian former footballer who played as a defender. A product of Dinamo Zagreb Academy, Drpić turned professional in 2000 and went on to spend nine years with the club.

== Club career ==
Drpić rose through the youth ranks of Dinamo and became a consistent performer in the first squad. He debuted for the first team in a UEFA Champions League qualifiers return match at A.C. Milan on 9 August 2000, and was one of the key figures in Dinamo's squad in the upcoming seasons. Dinamo loaned Dino to Karlsruher SC in 2008–09 winter transfer window following a scandal in which it was revealed that he and his Playboy model wife Nives Celzijus had sex on the grass at Dinamo's ground. He was signed permanently during the season and was released on 22 April 2010. After Karlsruhe, Drpić had brief spells with AEK Athens in Greece and Volyn Lutsk in Ukraine before returning to Croatia in March 2012, signing for HNK Rijeka.

In January 2013, Drpić signed with Brunei DPMM FC as one of their foreign players for the 2013 S.League season. However, his stay was brief as he was released by the club the following May.

== International career ==
After winning almost 30 caps as a Croatian youth international and having participated in the 2004 UEFA European Under-21 Football Championship, Drpić received his first call-up to represent the country as a full international in 2007. He made his debut for Croatia on 16 October 2007 in a friendly match against Slovakia, but did not feature in any of the team's qualifying matches for the UEFA Euro 2008. In the end, it remains his only full international appearance.

== Personal life ==
Drpić was married to Playboy model and singer Nives Celzijus, with whom he has children Taiša and Leone. They divorced in 2014.

While on holiday in Krk in the summer of 2008, a British couple tried to kidnap their son Leone after mistaking him for Madeleine McCann.

== Career statistics ==
Season	Club	League	Games	Goal(s)
2000–01	Dinamo Zagreb	Prva HNL	16	0
2001–02	Dinamo Zagreb	Prva HNL	21	0
2002–03	Dinamo Zagreb	Prva HNL	14	1
2003–04	Dinamo Zagreb	Prva HNL	32	3
2004–05	Dinamo Zagreb	Prva HNL	9	0
2005–06	Dinamo Zagreb	Prva HNL	31	1
2006–07	Dinamo Zagreb	Prva HNL	27	5
2007–08	Dinamo Zagreb	Prva HNL	22	1
2008–09	Dinamo Zagreb	Prva HNL	13	0
2008–09	Karlsruher SC	Bundesliga	16	0
2009–10	Karlsruher SC	2. Bundesliga	17	0
2010–11	AEK Athens	Super League Greece	2	0
2011–12	Volyn Lutsk	Ukraine Premier League	3	0
2011–12	HNK Rijeka	Prva HNL	7	0
2013	DPMM FC	S.League	11	0

== Honours ==
- Croatian First League: 2002–03, 2005–06, 2006–07, 2007–08
- Croatian Cup: 2003–04, 2006–07, 2007–08
