= Croatian Football Super Cup =

- Founded: 1992
- Region: Croatia
- Teams: 2
- Current champions: Dinamo Zagreb (8th title)
- Most championships: Dinamo Zagreb (8 titles)

The Croatian Football Super Cup is a football match between the winners of the Croatian national top league and football cup. The Super Cup is always held at the beginning of a new football season, and is only held when different clubs win the two most important competitions in the previous season (i.e. the match is not played when a club completes the domestic double).

Since the establishment of Croatian football competitions in 1992, the two local powerhouses Dinamo, Hajduk and HNK Rijeka have won doubles on sixteen occasions (Dinamo Zagreb 13, Rijeka 2, Hajduk Split 1). The Super Cup was not held in periods between 1995–2001, 2007–2009, 2011–2012 and 2015–2018. On three occasions the Super Cup was not played for various reasons - in 1999 Dinamo refused to play Osijek, saying the fixture did not fit into their schedule and in 2000 and 2001 Hajduk Split and Dinamo Zagreb could not agree on the rules and whether it should be played as a single match or over two legs, and in what order.

In 2002 the Croatian Football Federation took over the organisation of the Super Cup and made it an official single-legged fixture, with 30 minutes of extra time followed by a penalty shoot-out if necessary, which must be played a week before the following football season kicks off.

Since 2002, the match has always been hosted by the club which won the league title, with the exception of 2002 when NK Zagreb were reigning champions, but chose to "host" the match at crosstown rivals Dinamo's Maksimir Stadium saying that playing at Maksimir would help them prepare for their upcoming UEFA Champions League qualifying fixture. Their home stadium at Kranjčevićeva had been declared unfit for UEFA competitions and they were forced to host their European ties at Maksimir.

== Winners ==
Dinamo Zagreb (8 times), Hajduk Split (5 times) and Rijeka (1 time) are the only clubs who won the Super Cup. Seven out of thirteen Super Cup matches played so far have been decided in Eternal Derbies featuring Hajduk and Dinamo.

=== Key ===
*	Match went to extra time
	Match decided by a penalty shootout after extra time
‡	Match decided by a golden goal in extra time
	Two-legged tie

Year	Winner	Score	Runners–up	Venue	Attendance
1992	Hajduk Split (1)	0–0 (aet), (3–1 p)	Inker Zaprešić	Maksimir, Zagreb	10,000
1993	Hajduk Split (2)	4–4, 0–0 (a)	Croatia Zagreb	Maksimir, Zagreb; Poljud, Split	30,000; 30,000
1994	Hajduk Split (3)	1–0, 0–1 (aet), (5–4 p)	Croatia Zagreb	Poljud, Split; Maksimir, Zagreb	30,000; 15,000
1995	HAJDUK SPLIT (WON THE DOUBLE IN 1994–95)				
1996	N/A (CROATIA ZAGREB WON THE DOUBLE IN 1995–96)				
1997	N/A (CROATIA ZAGREB WON THE DOUBLE IN 1996–97)				
1998	N/A (CROATIA ZAGREB WON THE DOUBLE IN 1997–98)				
1999	N/A (CROATIA ZAGREB (L) AND OSIJEK (C) QUALIFIED)				
2000	N/A (DINAMO ZAGREB (L) AND HAJDUK SPLIT (C) QUALIFIED)				
2001	N/A (HAJDUK SPLIT (L) AND DINAMO ZAGREB (C) QUALIFIED)				
2002	Dinamo Zagreb (1)	3–2 ‡	NK Zagreb	Maksimir, Zagreb	10,000
2003	Dinamo Zagreb (2)	4–1	Hajduk Split	Maksimir, Zagreb	7,000
2004	Hajduk Split (4)	1–0	Dinamo Zagreb	Poljud, Split	17,000
2005	Hajduk Split (5)	1–0 *	Rijeka	Poljud, Split	18,000
2006	Dinamo Zagreb (3)	4–1	Rijeka	Maksimir, Zagreb	15,000
2007	N/A (DINAMO ZAGREB WON THE DOUBLE IN 2006–07)				
2008	N/A (DINAMO ZAGREB WON THE DOUBLE IN 2007–08)				
2009	N/A (DINAMO ZAGREB WON THE DOUBLE IN 2008–09)				
2010	Dinamo Zagreb (4)	1–0	Hajduk Split	Maksimir, Zagreb	8,000
2011	N/A (DINAMO ZAGREB WON THE DOUBLE IN 2010–11)				
2012	N/A (DINAMO ZAGREB WON THE DOUBLE IN 2011–12)				
2013	Dinamo Zagreb (5)	1–1 (4–1 p)	Hajduk Split	Maksimir, Zagreb	12,000
2014	Rijeka (1)	2–1	Dinamo Zagreb	Kantrida, Rijeka	8,000
2015	N/A (DINAMO ZAGREB WON THE DOUBLE IN 2014–15)				
2016	N/A (DINAMO ZAGREB WON THE DOUBLE IN 2015–16)				
2017	N/A (RIJEKA WON THE DOUBLE IN 2016–17)				
2018	N/A (DINAMO ZAGREB WON THE DOUBLE IN 2017–18)				
2019	Dinamo Zagreb (6)	1–0	Rijeka	Maksimir, Zagreb	5,075
2020	POSTPONED INDEFINITELY (DINAMO ZAGREB (L) AND RIJEKA (C) QUALIFIED)				
2021	N/A (DINAMO ZAGREB WON THE DOUBLE IN 2020–21)				
2022	Dinamo Zagreb (7)	0–0 (4–1 p)	Hajduk Split	Maksimir, Zagreb	16,532
2023	Dinamo Zagreb (8)	1–0	Hajduk Split	Maksimir, Zagreb	17,707
2024	N/A (DINAMO ZAGREB WON THE DOUBLE IN 2023–24)				
2025	N/A (RIJEKA WON THE DOUBLE IN 2024–25)				

== Results by team ==
Only five clubs participated in the Super Cup since 1992. Osijek also qualified for the Super Cup by winning the 1998–99 Croatian Football Cup, but the match was not held as clubs could not agree on the date of the fixture.

Club	Winners	Runners-up
Dinamo Zagreb	8	4
Hajduk Split	5	5
Rijeka	1	3
Inter Zaprešić	0	1
NK Zagreb	0	1

== Winning managers ==
Final	Winning manager	Winning club	Losing manager	Losing club
1992	Stanko Poklepović	Hajduk Split	Ilija Lončarević	Inker Zaprešić
1993	Ivan Katalinić	Hajduk Split	Miroslav Blažević	Croatia Zagreb
1994	Ivan Katalinić	Hajduk Split	Ivan Bedi	Croatia Zagreb
2002	Miroslav Blažević	Dinamo Zagreb	Ivan Katalinić	NK Zagreb
2003	Nikola Jurčević	Dinamo Zagreb	Zoran Vulić	Hajduk Split
2004	Ivan Katalinić	Hajduk Split	Nikola Jurčević	Dinamo Zagreb
2005	Miroslav Blažević	Hajduk Split	Elvis Scoria	Rijeka
2006	Josip Kuže	Dinamo Zagreb	Dragan Skočić	Rijeka
2010	Velimir Zajec	Dinamo Zagreb	Stanko Poklepović	Hajduk Split
2013	Krunoslav Jurčić	Dinamo Zagreb	Igor Tudor	Hajduk Split
2014	Matjaž Kek	Rijeka	Zoran Mamić	Dinamo Zagreb
2019	Nenad Bjelica	Dinamo Zagreb	Igor Bišćan	Rijeka
2022	Ante Čačić	Dinamo Zagreb	Valdas Dambrauskas	Hajduk Split
2023	Igor Bišćan	Dinamo Zagreb	Ivan Leko	Hajduk Split

=== By individual ===
Rank	Name	Winners	Club(s)	Winning years
1	(Croatia) Ivan Katalinić	3	Hajduk Split	1993, 1994, 2004
2	(Croatia) Miroslav Blažević	2	Dinamo Zagreb, Hajduk Split	2002, 2005
