= List of HNK Rijeka players =

Below is a list of notable footballers who have played for HNK Rijeka. The first table includes players who have played 50 or more official matches or scored more than 10 goals for the club since 1974–75. The second table includes players who have played 50 or more Yugoslav First League matches or scored more than 10 goals for the club between 1958 and 1969.

For individual records see the statistics and records related article. For the current squad, see the current season article.

== List of players (1974–2026) ==
Players are listed in alphabetical order. Appearances and goals are for first-team competitive matches and include:

- League: Yugoslav First League (1974–91), Croatian First Football League (1992–present);
- Cup: Yugoslav Cup (1974–91), Croatian Football Cup and Croatian Football Super Cup (1992–present);
- Europe: UEFA competitions (1978–present).

Bold denotes current members of the first-team squad. Updated 20 October 2026.

Name	Nationality	Position	Rijeka career	Apps	Goals	Apps	Goals	Apps	Goals	Apps	Goals
Name	Nationality	Position	Rijeka career	League		Cup & Supercup		Europe		Total	
Maxwell Acosty	(Ghana)	FW	2017–20	68	16	7	0	12	1	87	17
**Daniel Adu-Adjei**	(England)	**FW**	**2025–**	**36**	**10**	**6**	**4**	**16**	**5**	**58**	**19**
Jasmin Agić	(Croatia)	MF	1993–94, 1996–2000	102	4	9	0	2	0	113	4
Prince Ampem	(Ghana)	MF	2021–23	67	8	6	0	8	2	81	10
Franko Andrijašević	(Croatia)	MF	2016–17, 2019–21	84	34	10	2	7	1	101	37
Radojko Avramović	(Socialist Federal Republic of Yugoslavia) (Serbia)	GK	1974–79	119	0	14	0	4	0	137	0
Duje Baković	(Croatia)	DF	2006–08, 2010–11	57	0	9	0	0	0	66	0
Boško Balaban	(Croatia)	FW	1996–2000	100	21	8	1	2	0	110	22
Bekim Balaj	(Albania)	FW	2015–16	46	18	7	2	2	0	55	20
Zoran Ban	(Socialist Federal Republic of Yugoslavia) (Croatia)	FW	1991–93	38	11	7	0	0	0	45	11
Emmanuel Banda	(Zambia)	MF	2023–24	42	3	4	0	4	0	50	3
Stojan Belajić	(Socialist Federal Republic of Yugoslavia) (Croatia)	DF	1988–94	107	2	16	0	0	0	123	2
Leon Benko	(Croatia)	FW	2012–14	50	34	3	2	11	6	64	42
Igor Bernobić	(Croatia)	DF	1992–96, 1999	47	0	5	0	0	0	52	0
Mateo Bertoša	(Croatia)	DF	2007, 2013–16	34	0	8	1	8	0	50	1
Roman Bezjak	(Slovenia)	FW	2015–16, 2017	55	24	8	4	4	2	67	30
Bruno Bogojević	(Croatia)	MF	2022–26	52	3	10	1	12	0	74	4
Filip Bradarić	(Croatia)	MF	2015–18	103	7	15	1	14	0	132	8
Goran Brajković	(Croatia)	MF	1998–2003	131	9	11	3	8	1	150	13
Elvis Brajković	(Croatia)	DF	1992–94, 1996, 2001–02	110	3	24	1	0	0	134	4
Mate Brajković	(Croatia)	FW	2001–03, 2007	74	8	5	0	2	0	81	8
Josip Brezovec	(Croatia)	MF	2012–14, 2016	73	4	10	1	11	0	94	5
Senad Brkić	(Bosnia and Herzegovina)	FW	1995–98	85	31	6	2	0	0	91	33
Fausto Budicin	(Croatia)	DF	2005, 2006–11, 2014	137	10	16	0	6	0	159	10
Nino Bule	(Croatia)	FW	2006–08	49	7	6	1	2	1	57	9
Dragoljub Bursać	(Socialist Federal Republic of Yugoslavia) (Serbia)	MF	1978–82	51	7	5	1	5	0	61	8
Denis Bušnja	(Croatia)	FW	2018–19, 2021–23	49	2	7	6	7	2	63	10
Josip Butić	(Croatia)	MF	2003–05	56	5	5	0	2	0	63	5
Luka Capan	(Croatia)	MF	2018–21	70	2	11	0	10	0	91	2
Nikica Cukrov	(Socialist Federal Republic of Yugoslavia) (Croatia)	MF	1975–79	135	11	13	3	8	1	156	15
Božidar Čačić	(Croatia)	DF	1998–2001	60	6	4	0	4	0	68	6
Igor Čagalj	(Croatia)	DF	2007–12	112	1	15	0	5	0	132	1
Dario Čanađija	(Croatia)	MF	2014, 2016–17, 2018–19	41	0	6	2	5	0	52	2
Kristijan Čaval	(Croatia)	DF	1998–2005, 2010–13	196	14	18	2	7	0	221	16
Antonio Čolak	(Croatia) (Germany)	FW	2018–20	76	38	10	11	6	2	92	51
Duje Čop	(Croatia)	FW	2025–26	40	5	7	3	8	0	55	8
Antonini Čulina	(Croatia)	MF	2009–13	71	9	7	2	1	0	79	11
**Tiago Dantas**	(Portugal)	**MF**	**2025–**	**40**	**10**	**6**	**2**	**22**	**1**	**68**	**13**
Damir Desnica	(Socialist Federal Republic of Yugoslavia) (Croatia)	FW	1974–85	251	54	21	5	12	4	284	63
Duško Devčić	(Socialist Federal Republic of Yugoslavia) (Croatia)	DF	1974–76	62	4	0	0	0	0	62	4
**Mladen Devetak**	(Serbia)	**DF**	**2024–**	**67**	**2**	**11**	**0**	**23**	**0**	**101**	**2**
Naïs Djouahra	(France)	MF	2022–23, 2024–25	52	6	7	2	5	1	64	9
Branko Dragutinović	(Socialist Federal Republic of Yugoslavia) (Bosnia and Herzegovina)	DF	1987–91	122	1	10	0	0	0	132	1
Josip Drmić	(Switzerland) (Croatia)	FW	2021–22	46	27	5	4	4	1	55	32
Salih Durkalić	(Socialist Federal Republic of Yugoslavia) (Bosnia and Herzegovina)	FW	1974–79	98	18	8	0	4	1	110	19
Radomir Đalović	(Montenegro)	FW	2007–08, 2009–11	72	33	7	4	2	0	81	37
Davor Dželalija	(Croatia)	FW	1994–96	64	14	9	3	0	0	73	17
Josip Elez	(Croatia)	DF	2016–18	47	2	6	0	13	2	66	4
Tomislav Erceg	(Croatia)	FW	2004–05	32	17	8	7	2	2	42	26
João Escoval	(Portugal)	DF	2018–22	84	1	11	0	11	1	106	2
Adriano Fegic	(Socialist Federal Republic of Yugoslavia) (Slovenia)	FW	1977–85	161	36	9	2	8	4	178	42
Ramón Fernández	(Argentina)	MF	2008–10	50	7	4	0	3	0	57	7
Savo Filipović	(Socialist Federal Republic of Yugoslavia) (Serbia)	DF	1974–80	99	2	8	1	0	0	107	3
Matjaž Florijančič	(Socialist Federal Republic of Yugoslavia) (Slovenia)	FW	1987–91	83	7	5	0	0	0	88	7
Matija Frigan	(Croatia)	FW	2022–23	27	14	2	1	3	0	32	15
**Toni Fruk**	(Croatia)	**MF**	**2023–**	**106**	**29**	**15**	**6**	**32**	**7**	**153**	**42**
Tonči Gabrić	(Socialist Federal Republic of Yugoslavia) (Croatia)	GK	1988–91	92	0	6	0	0	0	98	0
Niko Galešić	(Croatia)	DF	2020–21, 2022–25	80	6	6	1	12	1	98	8
Nino Galović	(Croatia)	DF	2020–22	51	6	8	1	9	0	68	7
Mario Gavranović	(Switzerland) (Croatia)	FW	2016–18	59	25	9	9	12	6	80	40
Adam Gnezda Čerin	(Slovenia)	MF	2020–22	58	3	6	0	9	0	73	3
Bruno Goda	(Croatia)	DF	2022–25	43	4	5	0	5	2	53	6
**Amer Gojak**	(Bosnia and Herzegovina)	**MF**	**2024–**	**66**	**2**	**12**	**2**	**16**	**1**	**94**	**5**
Alexander Gorgon	(Austria)	MF	2016–20	100	34	14	5	13	4	127	43
Nenad Gračan	(Socialist Federal Republic of Yugoslavia) (Croatia)	MF	1980–86, 1995–96	146	32	13	4	4	0	163	36
Alen Grgić	(Croatia)	MF	2022–24	49	3	5	2	5	1	59	6
Tibor Halilović	(Croatia)	MF	2019–21	51	4	8	2	7	1	66	7
Admir Hasančić	(Bosnia and Herzegovina)	FW	1995–2000	147	46	10	3	4	2	161	51
Héber	(Brazil)	FW	2017–19	38	25	3	1	11	1	52	27
Veldin Hodža	(Croatia)	MF	2020, 2022–24	70	8	9	2	14	0	93	10
Alen Horvat	(Croatia)	DF	1992–96	67	1	16	0	0	0	83	1
Miloš Hrstić	(Socialist Federal Republic of Yugoslavia) (Croatia)	DF	1975–84	230	10	19	1	14	1	263	12
Mladen Ivančić	(Croatia)	DF	1994–99, 2001–03	153	7	18	2	2	0	173	9
Franjo Ivanović	(Croatia)	FW	2023–24	34	8	5	4	12	4	51	16
Janko Janković	(Socialist Federal Republic of Yugoslavia) (Croatia)	FW	1985–88	98	37	11	5	2	0	111	42
**Niko Janković**	(Croatia)	**MF**	**2023–25, 2026–**	**105**	**21**	**12**	**2**	**27**	**4**	**144**	**27**
Igor Jelavić	(Socialist Federal Republic of Yugoslavia) (Croatia)	DF	1985–88	85	0	11	0	2	0	98	0
Ive Jerolimov	(Socialist Federal Republic of Yugoslavia) (Croatia)	DF	1978–82	106	7	5	0	4	0	115	7
Vedran Jugović	(Croatia)	MF	2012–15	69	5	15	1	16	1	100	7
Srećko Juričić	(Socialist Federal Republic of Yugoslavia) (Croatia)	DF	1974–85	293	3	25	1	14	0	332	4
Matko Kalinić	(Croatia)	GK	2001–04	43	0	6	0	1	0	50	0
Dušan Kerkez	(Bosnia and Herzegovina)	MF	2005–07	41	1	11	1	3	1	55	3
Sandro Klić	(Croatia)	FW	1999–2004	80	23	3	2	4	2	87	27
Dušan Kljajić	(Socialist Federal Republic of Yugoslavia) (Serbia)	DF	1988–91	86	1	9	1	0	0	95	2
Damir Knežević	(Croatia)	FW	1993–94	36	11	7	4	0	0	43	15
Dario Knežević	(Croatia)	DF	2002–06, 2012–15	148	0	28	3	13	0	189	3
Fabijan Komljenović	(Socialist Federal Republic of Yugoslavia) (Croatia)	FW	1989–91	50	13	5	3	0	0	55	16
Vlado Kotur	(Socialist Federal Republic of Yugoslavia) (Bosnia and Herzegovina)	MF	1983–88	119	3	12	1	3	0	134	4
Andrej Kramarić	(Croatia)	FW	2013–14	42	37	7	10	16	8	65	55
Damir Kreilach	(Croatia)	MF	2008–13, 2025	129	19	11	0	6	0	146	19
Anton Krešić	(Croatia)	DF	2021–23	42	3	6	1	6	0	54	4
Sandi Križman	(Croatia)	MF	2008–11	76	9	10	3	4	0	90	12
Ivan Krstanović	(Bosnia and Herzegovina) (Croatia)	FW	2013–15	35	16	8	2	15	2	58	20
Ivan Kurtović	(Socialist Federal Republic of Yugoslavia) (Croatia)	DF	1989–94	95	5	18	1	0	0	113	6
Miodrag Kustudić	(Socialist Federal Republic of Yugoslavia) (Serbia)	FW	1974–78, 1983	76	39	7	3	0	0	83	42
Zoran Kvržić	(Bosnia and Herzegovina) (Croatia)	MF	2013–15, 2017–20	117	12	17	3	38	7	172	22
Nediljko Labrović	(Croatia)	GK	2021–24	94	0	4	0	11	0	109	0
Davor Landeka	(Bosnia and Herzegovina)	MF	2008–11	81	0	8	0	3	0	92	0
**Justas Lasickas**	(Lithuania)	**DF**	**2025–**	**37**	**1**	**4**	**0**	**22**	**1**	**63**	**2**
Marin Leovac	(Croatia) (Austria)	DF	2013–15, 2018	53	3	10	0	11	1	74	4
Ivan Lepinjica	(Croatia)	MF	2018–22, 2023	79	3	14	0	15	1	108	4
Peter Lérant	(Slovakia)	DF	2004–06	65	3	16	1	5	0	86	4
Marko Lešković	(Croatia)	DF	2013–16	62	3	10	3	15	1	87	7
Adrian Liber	(Croatia)	MF	2019, 2021–23	39	2	3	0	10	0	52	2
Siniša Linić	(Croatia)	MF	2000, 2002–07	136	14	30	9	6	0	172	23
Robert Lisjak	(Croatia)	GK	2010–12	76	0	7	0	0	0	83	0
Rade Ljepojević	(Socialist Federal Republic of Yugoslavia) (Croatia)	DF	1979–87	65	0	5	1	1	0	71	1
Stjepan Lončar	(Bosnia and Herzegovina) (Croatia)	MF	2018–21	89	8	12	2	12	2	113	12
Duško Lukić	(Socialist Federal Republic of Yugoslavia) (Bosnia and Herzegovina)	FW	1979–84	99	15	6	2	2	0	107	17
Sergio Machin	(Socialist Federal Republic of Yugoslavia) (Croatia)	MF	1974–81	166	6	10	1	9	0	185	7
**Ante Majstorović**	(Croatia)	**DF**	**2024–**	**72**	**0**	**11**	**0**	**24**	**1**	**107**	**1**
Nebojša Malbaša	(Socialist Federal Republic of Yugoslavia) (Serbia)	FW	1981–86	118	25	10	2	3	0	131	27
Mate Maleš	(Croatia)	MF	2013–18	90	2	13	1	24	0	127	3
Luka Marić	(Croatia)	DF	2012–14	39	0	5	0	9	0	53	0
Nikola Marjanović	(Socialist Federal Republic of Yugoslavia) (Serbia)	DF	1980–84	123	1	9	0	0	0	132	1
Ivan Maroslavac	(Croatia)	MF	2000–02	45	1	4	0	4	0	53	1
Florentin Matei	(Romania)	MF	2016–18	39	4	6	1	7	2	52	7
Danko Matrljan	(Socialist Federal Republic of Yugoslavia) (Croatia)	MF	1982–87	132	25	15	4	6	1	153	30
Damir Matulović	(Croatia)	MF	1999–2002	74	3	8	0	5	0	87	3
Luka Menalo	(Bosnia and Herzegovina) (Croatia)	FW	2020–21, 2025–26	60	10	9	3	15	2	84	15
Željko Mijač	(Socialist Federal Republic of Yugoslavia) (Croatia)	MF	1976–81	72	6	4	1	3	0	79	7
Andre Mijatović	(Croatia)	DF	1998–03	123	12	7	0	5	2	135	14
Nikica Milenković	(Socialist Federal Republic of Yugoslavia) (Croatia)	DF	1979–80, 1982–87	154	1	15	0	9	0	178	1
Ante Milicic	(Australia)	FW	1999–2001	51	15	4	0	4	1	59	16
Damir Milinović	(Croatia)	DF	1994–97, 1998–01, 2003–04	196	14	23	4	2	0	221	18
Josip Mišić	(Croatia)	MF	2015–18	65	4	13	0	12	1	90	5
Matej Mitrović	(Croatia)	DF	2013–17, 2022–24	108	5	17	2	14	0	139	7
Mladen Mladenović	(Socialist Federal Republic of Yugoslavia) (Croatia)	MF	1982–89, 1993–94, 1997	156	43	18	4	1	0	175	47
Ivan Močinić	(Croatia)	MF	2011–16	112	4	15	0	14	1	141	5
Josip Mohorović	(Socialist Federal Republic of Yugoslavia) (Croatia)	MF	1974–77	73	8	2	0	0	0	75	8
Lima Magalhães Moisés	(Brazil)	MF	2013–15	41	7	10	3	11	2	62	12
Goran Mujanović	(Croatia)	MF	2012–14	58	4	7	0	7	2	72	6
Jasmin Mujdža	(Bosnia and Herzegovina)	MF	2003–05	47	1	12	0	2	0	61	1
Robert Murić	(Croatia)	MF	2019–22	100	28	12	8	11	2	123	38
Igor Musa	(Croatia)	MF	1998–99	30	14	2	1	0	0	32	15
Igor Novaković	(Croatia)	MF	2004–06, 2008–09	98	16	23	8	4	0	125	24
Jorge Obregón	(Colombia)	FW	2021–24	84	14	8	3	13	0	105	17
**Ante Oreč**	(Croatia)	**DF**	**2025–**	**45**	**2**	**9**	**0**	**21**	**1**	**75**	**3**
Stjepan Ostojić	(Croatia)	MF	1995–97, 2001	49	1	5	0	0	0	54	1
Roberto Paliska	(Socialist Federal Republic of Yugoslavia) (Croatia)	DF	1984–91, 1995–96	172	8	17	0	2	0	191	8
Alen Pamić	(Croatia)	MF	2008–10	53	5	5	0	5	0	63	5
Marco Pašalić	(Croatia)	MF	2023–25	49	10	7	3	12	3	68	16
Domagoj Pavičić	(Croatia)	MF	2017–22	141	15	15	4	19	2	175	21
Dubravko Pavličić	(Socialist Federal Republic of Yugoslavia) (Croatia)	DF	1990–94	104	2	20	4	0	0	124	6
Darko Peranić	(Socialist Federal Republic of Yugoslavia) (Croatia)	DF	1977–86	52	0	10	0	0	0	62	0
Borimir Perković	(Croatia)	MF	1995–97	67	16	9	3	0	0	76	19
Saša Peršon	(Socialist Federal Republic of Yugoslavia) (Croatia)	DF	1987–90, 1997–98	109	1	6	0	0	0	115	1
Dejan Petrovič	(Slovenia)	MF	2023–26	74	2	8	0	18	2	100	4
Renato Pilipović	(Croatia)	MF	1995–99	74	3	10	2	0	0	84	5
Mario Prišć	(Croatia)	MF	2005–07	69	2	23	0	4	0	96	2
Andrej Prskalo	(Croatia)	GK	2014–22	81	0	12	0	14	0	107	0
**Jakov Puljić**	(Croatia)	**FW**	**2017–20, 2026–**	**68**	**25**	**10**	**5**	**11**	**2**	**89**	**32**
Roberto Punčec	(Croatia)	DF	2017–19	58	1	10	2	9	0	77	3
Natko Rački	(Croatia)	FW	2001–03	54	22	5	1	2	0	61	23
Stjepan Radeljić	(Bosnia and Herzegovina)	DF	2023–26	77	4	15	1	23	1	115	6
Zvjezdan Radin	(Socialist Federal Republic of Yugoslavia) (Croatia)	DF	1974–84	247	7	24	0	11	0	282	7
Velimir Radman	(Croatia)	GK	2004–10	77	0	14	0	3	0	94	0
Davor Radmanović	(Socialist Federal Republic of Yugoslavia) (Croatia)	MF	1977–78, 1983–87	95	18	13	2	6	1	114	21
Milan Radović	(Socialist Federal Republic of Yugoslavia) (Serbia)	FW	1976–81	123	56	14	2	6	2	143	60
Momčilo Raspopović	(Montenegro)	DF	2018–21	44	2	5	0	8	0	57	2
Mauro Ravnić	(Socialist Federal Republic of Yugoslavia) (Croatia)	GK	1978–88	186	0	14	0	13	0	213	0
Josip Ražić	(Socialist Federal Republic of Yugoslavia) (Croatia)	FW	1974–76	53	6	0	0	0	0	53	6
Krunoslav Rendulić	(Croatia)	DF	2005–07	56	1	14	0	4	1	74	2
Stefan Ristovski	(North Macedonia)	DF	2015–17	68	0	11	1	7	1	86	2
Mladen Romić	(Socialist Federal Republic of Yugoslavia) (Croatia)	DF	1988–93, 1996–98	180	2	19	1	0	0	199	3
Robert Rubčić	(Socialist Federal Republic of Yugoslavia) (Croatia)	DF	1982–84, 1985–94, 1995	184	6	26	1	0	0	210	7
Gabriel Rukavina	(Croatia)	FW	2024–26	46	3	8	1	8	0	62	4
Milan Ružić	(Socialist Federal Republic of Yugoslavia) (Croatia)	MF	1976–83	176	18	15	2	10	0	201	20
Jasmin Samardžić	(Croatia)	FW	1992–96, 2003–04	126	15	25	8	0	0	151	23
Miral Samardžić	(Slovenia)	DF	2014–16	52	6	10	4	11	1	73	11
Elvis Scoria	(Socialist Federal Republic of Yugoslavia) (Croatia)	FW	1989–94	75	13	14	1	0	0	89	14
Lindon Selahi	(Albania)	MF	2021–25	123	9	14	0	16	0	153	9
Ahmad Sharbini	(Croatia)	FW	2003–07, 2008–09	117	54	24	14	7	2	148	70
Anas Sharbini	(Croatia)	MF	2005–09, 2013–15	137	39	20	5	22	2	179	46
Bledi Shkëmbi	(Albania)	MF	2002–04	49	2	3	2	2	0	54	4
Josip Skoblar	(Socialist Federal Republic of Yugoslavia) (Croatia)	FW	1974–77	36	11	1	0	0	0	37	11
Stjepan Skočibušić	(Croatia)	DF	1999–2003	93	7	9	0	6	0	108	7
Simon Sluga	(Croatia)	GK	2015, 2016–19	64	0	10	0	12	0	86	0
Hrvoje Smolčić	(Croatia)	DF	2019–22	68	1	7	1	10	0	85	2
Ivan Smolčić	(Croatia)	DF	2019, 2021, 2022–25	70	1	9	1	9	1	88	3
Borče Sredojević	(Socialist Federal Republic of Yugoslavia) (Bosnia and Herzegovina)	DF	1984–87	105	0	12	0	6	0	123	0
Radomir Stefanović	(Socialist Federal Republic of Yugoslavia) (Serbia)	DF	1974–77	68	1	2	0	0	0	70	1
Miro Stipić	(Socialist Federal Republic of Yugoslavia) (Croatia)	MF	1988–91	68	4	7	0	0	0	75	4
Barnabás Sztipánovics	(Hungary)	FW	1998–2000	56	19	3	1	2	1	61	21
Daniel Šarić	(Socialist Federal Republic of Yugoslavia) (Croatia)	DF	1990–93, 2003–07	147	9	34	2	5	0	186	11
Fuad Šašivarević	(Bosnia and Herzegovina)	MF	1992–94	51	6	12	3	0	0	63	9
Zoran Šestan	(Socialist Federal Republic of Yugoslavia) (Croatia)	MF	1977–87	73	2	9	0	1	0	83	2
Zoran Škerjanc	(Socialist Federal Republic of Yugoslavia) (Croatia)	MF	1982–88, 1992	112	19	11	0	2	0	125	19
Daniel Štefulj	(Croatia)	DF	2018–21	41	0	7	0	8	0	56	0
Hrvoje Štrok	(Croatia)	MF	2007–11	122	16	12	4	6	0	140	20
Miroslav Šugar	(Socialist Federal Republic of Yugoslavia) (Croatia)	DF	1975–82	101	0	4	0	2	0	107	0
Valdi Šumberac	(Socialist Federal Republic of Yugoslavia) (Croatia)	MF	1986–91	59	1	1	0	0	0	60	1
Andro Švrljuga	(Croatia)	DF	2010–12	52	3	8	0	0	0	60	3
Dragan Tadić	(Croatia)	MF	1992–95, 2003–06	158	7	34	4	5	0	197	11
Đoni Tafra	(Croatia)	GK	1996–2003	176	0	7	0	7	0	190	0
Boris Tičić	(Socialist Federal Republic of Yugoslavia) (Croatia)	DF	1982–86	69	1	3	0	2	0	74	1
Igor Tkalčević	(Croatia)	DF	2004–07	60	3	16	0	3	0	79	3
Mario Tokić	(Croatia)	DF	1993–98	133	5	19	2	0	0	152	7
Marin Tomasov	(Croatia)	MF	2015–16	53	16	8	6	4	1	65	23
Ivan Tomečak	(Croatia)	DF	2013–15, 2019–22	136	9	17	2	38	1	191	12
Edmond Tomić	(Socialist Federal Republic of Yugoslavia) (Kosovo)	FW	1978–83	129	35	9	3	8	1	146	39
Mauro Tomišić	(Croatia)	DF	1998–2000	51	0	4	0	5	0	60	0
Predrag Valenčić	(Socialist Federal Republic of Yugoslavia) (Croatia)	MF	1984–90	114	14	7	0	1	0	122	14
Ivan Vargić	(Croatia)	GK	2012–16	95	0	14	0	23	0	132	0
Darko Velkovski	(North Macedonia)	DF	2018–22	62	1	8	0	8	1	78	2
Marko Vešović	(Montenegro)	MF	2013–18	84	11	15	1	19	0	118	12
Rajko Vidović	(Croatia)	FW	2001–02, 2003–04	44	10	10	3	0	0	54	13
Goran Vincetić	(Croatia)	DF	2001–03	52	1	5	1	2	1	59	3
Dalibor Višković	(Croatia)	DF	1995–2002	156	1	16	0	6	0	178	1
Haris Vučkić	(Slovenia)	FW	2021–22	37	12	3	2	3	1	43	15
Davor Vugrinec	(Croatia)	FW	2005–06	24	15	6	4	0	0	30	19
Zoran Vujčić	(Socialist Federal Republic of Yugoslavia) (Croatia)	FW	1986–90	93	16	11	1	2	0	106	17
Andrija Vukčević	(Montenegro)	DF	2021–23	72	1	5	0	11	0	88	1
Kazimir Vulić	(Socialist Federal Republic of Yugoslavia) (Croatia)	MF	1987–93, 1999	109	11	8	3	0	0	117	14
Neshet Zhaveli	(Socialist Federal Republic of Yugoslavia) (Kosovo)	GK	1979–84	77	0	5	0	0	0	82	0
Martin Zlomislić	(Bosnia and Herzegovina)	GK	2021–26	77	0	18	0	22	0	117	0
Leonard Zuta	(North Macedonia) (Sweden)	DF	2015–19	109	2	16	0	14	0	139	2
Mladen Žganjer	(Socialist Federal Republic of Yugoslavia) (Croatia)	GK	1989–97	146	0	30	0	0	0	176	0
Dragan Žilić	(Serbia)	GK	2005–08	79	0	15	1	4	0	98	1
Andrej Živković	(Croatia)	MF	1993–96	71	4	13	0	0	0	84	4
Dario Župarić	(Croatia)	DF	2017–19	89	4	10	1	18	0	117	5

== List of players (1958–69) ==
Due to incomplete data, this article only partially includes statistics for seasons before 1974–75. The table below lists players who have played 50 or more league matches or scored more than ten goals for Rijeka between 1958–59 and 1968–69, when the club competed in the Yugoslav First League.

Name	Position	Rijeka career	Apps	Goals
Name	Position	Rijeka career	1. Div	
Marijan Brnčić	DF	1959–64	95	1
Mario Brnjac	DF	1963–69	103	2
Boško Bursać	FW	1965–69	106	41
Branko Čalović	MF	1967–69	61	2
Duško Devčić	DF	1965–69	76	0
Ferdo Dunaj	DF	1958–62	72	0
Blaž Granić	DF	1959–63	53	0
Tonči Gulin	FW	1963–68	82	30
Marijan Jantoljak	GK	1959–69	190	9
Vladimir Lukarić	FW	1958–69	202	40
Ivan Medle	FW	1958–63	79	22
Ratko Mihovilović	DF	1958–63	79	0
Anđelo Milevoj	DF	1963–69	174	0
Zoran Mišić	GK	1959–64	53	0
Ɖorđe Mugoša	DF	1962–68	97	2
Velimir Naumović	MF	1958–65	155	19
Marko Pavković	DF	1958–61	65	0
Andrija Perčić	MF	1964–69	84	19
Berislav Poldrugovac	MF	1967–69	51	6
Bruno Rabac	DF	1962–68	78	2
Petar Radaković	MF	1959–67	132	15
Ivica Šangulin	DF	1962–66	70	0
Mile Tomljenović	MF	1963–67	60	8
Bruno Veselica	FW	1958–64	83	38
Mladen Vranković	DF	1960–68	158	5
Nedeljko Vukoje	FW	1961–69	143	32
Vincenzo Zadel	MF	1959–64	73	14
Roko Žepina	FW	1967–69	41	10

== List of captains ==
Name	Years
(Socialist Federal Republic of Yugoslavia) Josip Mohorović	1975–1976
(Socialist Federal Republic of Yugoslavia) Zvjezdan Radin	1976–1984
(Socialist Federal Republic of Yugoslavia) Srećko Juričić	1984–1985
(Socialist Federal Republic of Yugoslavia) Mauro Ravnić	1985–1988
(Socialist Federal Republic of Yugoslavia) Robert Rubčić	1988–1990
(Socialist Federal Republic of Yugoslavia) Saša Peršon	1990
(Socialist Federal Republic of Yugoslavia) Tonči Gabrić	1990–1991
(Croatia) Robert Rubčić	1991–1993
(Croatia) Mladen Mladenović	1993–1994
(Croatia) Mladen Žganjer	1994–1996
(Croatia) Nenad Gračan	1996
(Croatia) Damir Milinović	1996–1997
(Croatia) Saša Peršon	1998
(Croatia) Mladen Ivančić	1998–1999
(Croatia) Damir Milinović	1999–2000
(Croatia) Andre Mijatović	2000–2003
(Croatia) Daniel Šarić	2003–2007
(Croatia) Anas Sharbini	2007–2009
(Croatia) Fausto Budicin	2009–2011
(Croatia) Igor Čagalj	2011–2012
(Croatia) Dario Knežević	2012–2014
(Croatia) Anas Sharbini	2014–2015
(Croatia) Ivan Močinić	2015–2016
(Croatia) Mate Maleš	2016–2018
(Croatia) Filip Bradarić	2018
(Croatia) Simon Sluga	2018
(Austria) Alexander Gorgon	2018–2020
(Croatia) Franko Andrijašević	2020–2021
(Croatia) Hrvoje Smolčić	2021–2022
(Slovenia) Haris Vučkić	2022
(Croatia) Nediljko Labrović	2023–2024
(Croatia) Ivan Smolčić	2024–2025
(Bosnia and Herzegovina) Martin Zlomislić	2025–2026
(Croatia) Ante Majstorović	2026–
