= 2001–02 HNK Rijeka season =

Rijeka
2001–02 season
- Chairman: Sanjin Kirigin
- Manager: Ivan Katalinić
- Prva HNL: 5th
- Croatian Cup: Quarterfinal
- Top goalscorer: League: Natko Rački (13); All: Natko Rački (14)
- Highest home attendance: 7,000 vs Dinamo (21 October 2001 - Prva HNL)
- Lowest home attendance: 800 vs Cibalia (23 March 2002 - Prva HNL)
- Average home league attendance: 2,620

The 2001–02 season was the 56th season in Rijeka's history. It was their 11th season in the Prva HNL and 28th successive top tier season.

== Competitions ==
Competition	First match	Last match	Starting round	Final position	Record							
Competition	First match	Last match	Starting round	Final position	G	W	D	L	GF	GA	GD	Win %
Prva HNL	29 July 2001	4 May 2002	Matchday 1	5th	30	15	6	9	46	37	+9	50.00
Croatian Cup	19 September 2001	7 December 2001	First round	Quarterfinal	4	1	1	2	5	5	+0	25.00
Total					34	16	7	11	51	42	+9	47.06

=== Prva HNL ===
==== Classification ====
Pos	Team	Pld	W	D	L	GF	GA	GD	Pts	Qualification or relegation
3	Dinamo Zagreb	30	18	5	7	58	30	+28	59	Qualification to UEFA Cup first round
4	Varteks	30	17	6	7	58	40	+18	57	Qualification to UEFA Cup qualifying round
5	Rijeka	30	15	6	9	46	37	+9	51	Qualification to Intertoto Cup first round
6	Slaven Belupo	30	11	9	10	34	36	−2	42	Qualification to Intertoto Cup first round
7	Pomorac	30	12	4	14	36	41	−5	40	

Source: RSSSF.org
Rules for classification: 1) points; 2) goal difference; 3) number of goals scored.

==== Results summary ====
Overall								Home						Away					
Pld	W	D	L	GF	GA	GD	Pts	W	D	L	GF	GA	GD	W	D	L	GF	GA	GD
30	15	6	9	46	37	+9	51	9	4	2	29	12	+17	6	2	7	17	25	−8

==== Results by round ====
Round	1	2	3	4	5	6	7	8	9	10	11	12	13	14	15	16	17	18	19	20	21	22	23	24	25	26	27	28	29	30
Ground	H	A	A	H	A	H	A	H	A	H	A	H	A	H	A	A	H	A	A	H	A	H	A	H	A	H	A	H	A	H
Result	W	L	W	L	L	W	W	D	D	W	W	W	W	W	L	D	L	L	L	D	W	W	L	D	W	D	W	W	L	W
Position	5	10	5	8	10	6	5	5	5	5	5	4	4	4	4	4	5	5	5	5	5	5	5	5	5	5	5	5	5	5

Source: Competitive matches
A = Away; H = Home; W = Win; D = Draw; L = Loss

== Matches ==
=== Prva HNL ===
Round	Date	Venue	Opponent	Score	Attendance	Rijeka Scorers	Report
1	29 Jul	H	Slaven Belupo	1 – 0	2,500	Skočibušić	HRnogomet.com
2	4 Aug	AR	Hajduk Split	1 – 4	6,000	Mijatović	HRnogomet.com
3	12 Aug	H	Osijek	4 – 0	2,500	Skočibušić, Čačić, Matulović, Vidović	HRnogomet.com
4	19 Aug	H	Zagreb	0 – 1	5,000		HRnogomet.com
5	26 Aug	A	Varteks	0 – 2	5,000		HRnogomet.com
6	9 Sep	H	Marsonia	1 – 0	2,500	M. Brajković	HRnogomet.com
7	15 Sep	AR	TŠK Topolovac	3 – 2	1,500	Milinović, Meštrović, Vidović	HRnogomet.com
8	23 Sep	H	Zadar	1 – 1	2,000	M. Brajković	HRnogomet.com
9	29 Sep	A	Cibalia	1 – 1	500	M. Brajković	HRnogomet.com
10	10 Oct	H	Šibenik	5 – 0	1,000	Skočibušić, Rački (3), Maroslavac	HRnogomet.com
11	14 Oct	A	Pomorac	1 – 0	3,500	Rački	HRnogomet.com
12	21 Oct	H	Dinamo Zagreb	1 – 0	7,000	o.g.	HRnogomet.com
13	27 Oct	A	Čakovec	1 – 0	2,000	Mijatović	HRnogomet.com
14	4 Nov	H	Kamen Ingrad	4 – 1	2,000	Rački (2), Matulović, Meštrović	HRnogomet.com
15	17 Nov	A	Hrvatski Dragovoljac	0 – 3	400		HRnogomet.com
16	24 Nov	A	Slaven Belupo	2 – 2	2,000	E. Brajković, Rački	HRnogomet.com
17	28 Nov	H	Hajduk Split	1 – 2	6,000	Mijatović	HRnogomet.com
18	2 Feb	A	Osijek	0 – 1	800		HRnogomet.com
19	24 Feb	A	Zagreb	0 – 3	2,000		HRnogomet.com
20	3 Mar	H	Varteks	1 – 1	1,500	M. Brajković	HRnogomet.com
21	6 Mar	A	Marsonia	4 – 1	2,500	Burčul, M. Brajković, Meštrović, Rački	HRnogomet.com
22	9 Mar	H	TŠK Topolovac	2 – 0	1,000	G. Brajković, Meštrović	HRnogomet.com
23	16 Mar	A	Zadar	0 – 2	2,500		HRnogomet.com
24	23 Mar	H	Cibalia	1 – 1	800	Rački	HRnogomet.com
25	30 Mar	A	Šibenik	1 – 0	1,000	Shkëmbi	HRnogomet.com
26	6 Apr	H	Pomorac	2 – 2	2,000	Mijatović (2)	HRnogomet.com
27	14 Apr	A	Dinamo Zagreb	3 – 2	2,500	Rački, Skočibušić, Vidović	HRnogomet.com
28	20 Apr	H	Čakovec	2 – 1	1,000	Rački, Vidović	HRnogomet.com
29	27 Apr	A	Kamen Ingrad	0 – 2	3,500		HRnogomet.com
30	4 May	H	Hrvatski Dragovoljac	3 – 2	2,500	Čaval, Rački (2)	HRnogomet.com

Source: HRnogomet.com

=== Croatian Cup ===
Round	Date	Venue	Opponent	Score	Attendance	Rijeka Scorers	Report
R1	19 Sep	A	Vukovar '91	4 – 2	?	Meštrović, Milinović, G. Brajković, Vincetić	HRnogomet.com
R2	24 Oct	A	Hrvatski Dragovoljac	1 – 1 (5–4 p)	400	Rački	HRnogomet.com
QF	21 Nov	A	Dinamo Zagreb	0 – 1	2,500		HRnogomet.com
QF	7 Dec	H	Dinamo Zagreb	0 – 1	4,000		HRnogomet.com

Source: HRnogomet.com

=== Squad statistics ===
Competitive matches only.
Appearances in brackets indicate numbers of times the player came on as a substitute.

Name	Apps	Goals	Apps	Goals	Apps	Goals
Name	League		Cup		Total	
(Croatia) Đoni Tafra	24 (0)	0	1 (0)	0	25 (0)	0
(Croatia) Andre Mijatović	26 (0)	5	1 (0)	0	27 (0)	5
(Croatia) Elvis Brajković	18 (1)	1	3 (0)	0	21 (1)	1
(Croatia) Dalibor Višković	21 (2)	0	3 (0)	0	24 (2)	0
(Croatia) Goran Vincetić	25 (0)	0	4 (0)	1	29 (0)	1
(Croatia) Mladen Ivančić	11 (1)	0	0 (1)	0	11 (2)	0
(Croatia) Stjepan Skočibušić	26 (0)	4	3 (1)	0	29 (1)	4
(Croatia) Goran Brajković	26 (1)	1	4 (0)	1	30 (1)	2
(Croatia) Natko Rački	12 (12)	13	2 (1)	1	14 (13)	14
(Croatia) Mate Brajković	20 (7)	5	3 (1)	0	23 (8)	5
(Croatia) Mario Meštrović	19 (7)	4	2 (1)	1	21 (8)	5
(Croatia) Damir Matulović	14 (6)	2	4 (0)	0	18 (6)	2
(Croatia) Ivan Maroslavac	15 (9)	1	3 (1)	0	18 (10)	1
(Bosnia and Herzegovina) Rajko Vidović	15 (6)	4	3 (1)	0	18 (7)	4
(Croatia) Kristijan Čaval	12 (8)	1	1 (2)	0	13 (10)	1
(Albania) Bledi Shkëmbi	11 (0)	1	0 (0)	0	11 (0)	1
(Croatia) Damir Milinović	8 (0)	1	4 (0)	1	12 (0)	2
(Croatia) Sandro Klić	0 (9)	0	0 (0)	0	0 (9)	0
(Croatia) Goran Burčul	8 (9)	1	0 (0)	0	8 (9)	1
(Croatia) Božidar Čačić	4 (0)	1	0 (0)	0	4 (0)	1
(Croatia) Matko Djarmati	0 (4)	0	0 (0)	0	0 (4)	0
(Croatia) Edo Flego	3 (3)	0	0 (0)	0	3 (3)	0
(Croatia) Matko Kalinić	6 (0)	0	3 (0)	0	9 (0)	0
(Croatia) Josip Modrić	3 (3)	0	0 (0)	0	3 (3)	0
(North Macedonia) Miroslav Vajs	3 (0)	0	0 (0)	0	3 (0)	0

== See also ==
- 2001–02 Prva HNL
- 2001–02 Croatian Cup

== External sources ==
- 2001–02 Prva HNL at HRnogomet.com
- 2001–02 Croatian Cup at HRnogomet.com
- Prvenstvo 2001.-2002. at nk-rijeka.hr
