= 2000–01 HNK Rijeka season =

Rijeka
2000–01 season
- Chairman: Robert Ježić, Sanjin Kirigin
- Manager: Nenad Gračan, Boris Tičić, Predrag Stilinović, Ivan Katalinić
- Prva HNL: 10th
- Croatian Cup: Round 1
- UEFA Cup: Round 1
- Top goalscorer: League: Ante Milicic (10); All: Ante Milicic (11)
- Highest home attendance: 6,000 (2 times - Prva HNL)
- Lowest home attendance: 300 vs Marsonia (19 May 2001 - Prva HNL)
- Average home league attendance: 1,900

The 2000–01 season was the 55th season in Rijeka's history. It was their 10th season in the Prva HNL and 27th successive top tier season.

== Competitions ==
Competition	First match	Last match	Starting round	Final position	Record							
Competition	First match	Last match	Starting round	Final position	G	W	D	L	GF	GA	GD	Win %
Prva HNL	29 July 2000	27 May 2001	Matchday 1	10th	32	9	6	17	30	44	−14	28.13
Croatian Cup	5 September 2000	5 September 2000	First round	First round	1	0	0	1	0	2	−2	0.00
UEFA Cup	10 August 2000	28 September 2000	Qualifying round	First round	4	2	1	1	8	7	+1	50.00
Total					37	11	7	19	38	53	−15	29.73

=== Prva HNL ===
==== First stage ====
Pos	Team	Pld	W	D	L	GF	GA	GD	Pts	Qualification
8	Šibenik	22	7	5	10	21	30	−9	26	Qualification to relegation group
9	Hrvatski Dragovoljac	22	6	5	11	28	45	−17	23	Qualification to relegation group
10	Cibalia	22	3	11	8	23	38	−15	20	Qualification to relegation group
11	Rijeka	22	5	4	13	17	32	−15	19	Qualification to relegation group
12	Marsonia	22	4	4	14	28	49	−21	16	Qualification to relegation group

Source: RSSSF.org
Rules for classification: 1) points; 2) goal difference; 3) number of goals scored.

==== Second stage (relegation play-off) ====
Pos	Team	Pld	W	D	L	GF	GA	GD	Pts	Qualification
7	Šibenik	32	12	7	13	40	40	0	43	
8	Čakovec	32	10	9	13	28	37	−9	39	
9	Cibalia	32	5	18	9	31	45	−14	33	
10	Rijeka	32	9	6	17	30	44	−14	33	
11	Hrvatski Dragovoljac	32	8	9	15	35	57	−22	33	
12	Marsonia (O)	32	7	8	17	41	68	−27	29	Qualification to relegation play-off

Source: RSSSF.org
Rules for classification: 1) points; 2) goal difference; 3) number of goals scored.
(O) Play-off winners

==== Results summary ====
Overall								Home						Away					
Pld	W	D	L	GF	GA	GD	Pts	W	D	L	GF	GA	GD	W	D	L	GF	GA	GD
32	9	6	17	30	44	−14	33	4	5	7	16	16	0	5	1	10	14	28	−14

==== Results by round ====
Round	1	2	3	4	5	6	7	8	9	10	11	12	13	14	15	16	17	18	19	20	21	22	23	24	25	26	27	28	29	30	31	32
Ground	H	H	A	H	A	H	A	H	A	H	A	A	A	H	A	H	A	H	A	H	A	H	A	H	A	A	H	H	A	H	H	A
Result	L	L	D	D	W	D	L	L	L	D	W	L	L	W	L	L	L	W	W	L	L	L	L	D	L	W	D	L	W	W	W	L
Position	9	10	9	10	10	9	10	10	10	10	10	10	10	9	9	10	10	10	9	10	10	11	11	11	11	11	11	11	11	10	9	10

Source: Competitive matches
A = Away; H = Home; W = Win; D = Draw; L = Loss

== Matches ==
=== Prva HNL ===
Round	Date	Venue	Opponent	Score	Attendance	Rijeka Scorers	Report
1	29 Jul	H	Šibenik	0 – 1	2,500		HRnogomet.com
2	4 Aug	H	Dinamo Zagreb	0 – 1	6,000		HRnogomet.com
3	14 Aug	A	Hrvatski Dragovoljac	0 – 0	2,500		HRnogomet.com
4	19 Aug	H	Varteks	2 – 2	1,500	Hasančić, Milicic	HRnogomet.com
5	29 Aug	A	Osijek	2 – 1	3,000	Milicic, G. Brajković	HRnogomet.com
6	9 Sep	H	Hajduk Split	0 – 0	6,000		HRnogomet.com
7	19 Sep	A	Marsonia	0 – 2	2,000		HRnogomet.com
8	23 Sep	H	Zagreb	0 – 1	1,000		HRnogomet.com
10	4 Oct	H	Čakovec	1 – 1	1,000	Milicic	HRnogomet.com
11	14 Oct	A	Cibalia	2 – 1	500	o.g., Čaval	HRnogomet.com
9	17 Oct	A	Slaven Belupo	0 – 1	?		HRnogomet.com
12	22 Oct	A	Šibenik	0 – 1	1,500		HRnogomet.com
13	30 Oct	A	Dinamo Zagreb	1 – 4	700	Matulović	HRnogomet.com
14	4 Nov	H	Hrvatski Dragovoljac	2 – 0	700	Kremenović, Skočibušić	HRnogomet.com
15	11 Nov	A	Varteks	1 – 6	2,000	Dragičević	HRnogomet.com
16	17 Nov	H	Osijek	2 – 3	2,000	Čaval (2)	HRnogomet.com
17	26 Nov	A	Hajduk Split	0 – 3	2,500		HRnogomet.com
18	2 Dec	H	Marsonia	2 – 0	600	Hasančić, Milicic	HRnogomet.com
19	25 Feb	A	Zagreb	1 – 0	700	Mikac	HRnogomet.com
20	4 Mar	H	Slaven Belupo	0 – 1	1,000		HRnogomet.com
21	11 Mar	A	Čakovec	0 – 1	2,000		HRnogomet.com
22	18 Mar	H	Cibalia	1 – 2	1,000	Milicic	HRnogomet.com
23	1 Apr	A	Šibenik	0 – 3	1,000		HRnogomet.com
24	8 Apr	H	Hrvatski Dragovoljac	1 – 1	1,500	Mijatović	HRnogomet.com
25	14 Apr	A	Cibalia	0 – 1	500		HRnogomet.com
26	22 Apr	A	Marsonia	3 – 1	2,500	Flego (2), Čaval	HRnogomet.com
27	29 Apr	H	Čakovec	1 – 1	1,500	Milicic	HRnogomet.com
28	2 May	H	Šibenik	1 – 2	800	Flego	HRnogomet.com
29	6 May	A	Hrvatski Dragovoljac	4 – 1	300	Flego, Milicic (3)	HRnogomet.com
30	13 May	H	Cibalia	1 – 0	3,000	Flego	HRnogomet.com
31	19 May	H	Marsonia	2 – 0	300	Milicic, Rački	HRnogomet.com
32	27 May	A	Čakovec	0 – 2	400		HRnogomet.com

Source: HRnogomet.com

=== Croatian Cup ===
Round	Date	Venue	Opponent	Score	Attendance	Rijeka Scorers	Report
R1	5 Sep	A	Kamen Ingrad	0 – 2	3,000		HRnogomet.com

Source: HRnogomet.com

=== UEFA Cup ===
Round	Date	Venue	Opponent	Score	Attendance	Rijeka Scorers	Report
QR	10 Aug	H	Valletta (Malta)	3 – 2	4,730	Mijatović (2), Hasančić	HRnogomet.com
QR	24 Aug	A	Valletta (Malta)	5 – 4 (aet)	3,932	Kremenović, Milicic, G. Brajković, o.g., Hasančić	HRnogomet.com
R1	14 Sep	A	Celta Vigo (Spain)	0 – 0	8,300		HRnogomet.com
R1	28 Sep	H	Celta Vigo (Spain)	0 – 1 (aet)	4,691		HRnogomet.com

Source: HRnogomet.com

=== Squad statistics ===
Competitive matches only.
Appearances in brackets indicate numbers of times the player came on as a substitute.

Name	Apps	Goals	Apps	Goals	Apps	Goals	Apps	Goals
Name	League		Cup		Europe		Total	
(Croatia) Đoni Tafra	30 (0)	0	0 (0)	0	4 (0)	0	34 (0)	0
(North Macedonia) Miroslav Vajs	23 (0)	0	1 (0)	0	3 (0)	0	27 (0)	0
(Croatia) Andre Mijatović	28 (0)	1	0 (0)	0	4 (0)	2	32 (0)	3
(Croatia) Dalibor Višković	24 (0)	0	1 (0)	0	4 (0)	0	29 (0)	0
(Croatia) Ratko Kremenović	19 (4)	1	0 (0)	0	4 (0)	1	23 (4)	2
(Croatia) Božidar Čačić	13 (0)	0	1 (0)	0	2 (0)	0	16 (0)	0
(Croatia) Stjepan Skočibušić	26 (0)	1	0 (1)	0	4 (0)	0	30 (1)	1
(Croatia) Goran Brajković	28 (1)	1	1 (0)	0	4 (0)	1	33 (1)	2
(Bosnia and Herzegovina) Admir Hasančić	12 (0)	2	0 (0)	0	2 (0)	2	14 (0)	4
(Croatia) Damir Matulović	24 (0)	1	0 (1)	0	4 (0)	0	28 (1)	1
(Croatia) Ivan Maroslavac	13 (8)	0	1 (0)	0	2 (2)	0	16 (10)	0
(Croatia) Mauro Tomišić	10 (0)	0	0 (0)	0	0 (3)	0	10 (3)	0
(Australia) Ante Milicic	15 (14)	10	1 (0)	0	3 (1)	1	19 (15)	11
(Croatia) Kristijan Čaval	19 (3)	4	0 (0)	0	3 (0)	0	22 (3)	4
(Croatia) Sandro Klić	6 (7)	0	0 (0)	0	1 (1)	0	7 (8)	0
(Croatia) Marijan Buljat	5 (7)	0	1 (0)	0	0 (0)	0	6 (7)	0
(Croatia) Mate Dragičević	13 (6)	1	0 (0)	0	0 (0)	0	13 (6)	1
(Croatia) Goran Burčul	7 (3)	0	0 (0)	0	0 (1)	0	7 (4)	0
(Croatia) Matko Djarmati	6 (4)	0	0 (0)	0	0 (0)	0	6 (4)	0
(Croatia) Edo Flego	9 (1)	5	0 (0)	0	0 (0)	0	9 (1)	5
(Croatia) Natko Rački	1 (4)	1	0 (0)	0	0 (0)	0	1 (4)	1
(Croatia) Boris Pavić	3 (2)	0	1 (0)	0	0 (1)	0	4 (3)	0
(Croatia) Marin Mikac	4 (3)	1	0 (0)	0	0 (0)	0	4 (3)	1
(Croatia) Josip Modrić	6 (0)	0	0 (0)	0	0 (0)	0	6 (0)	0
(Croatia) Stjepan Ostojić	4 (1)	0	0 (0)	0	0 (0)	0	4 (1)	0
(Croatia) Darko Horvat	2 (2)	0	1 (0)	0	0 (0)	0	3 (2)	0
(Croatia) Alen Zidarić	0 (2)	0	1 (0)	0	0 (0)	0	1 (2)	0
(Croatia) Mate Brajković	2 (2)	0	0 (0)	0	0 (0)	0	2 (2)	0
(Croatia) Vanja Iveša	0 (1)	0	0 (0)	0	0 (0)	0	0 (1)	0
(Brazil) Paulino Gomes	0 (1)	0	0 (1)	0	0 (1)	0	0 (3)	0
(Croatia) Stipe Režić	0 (1)	0	1 (0)	0	0 (0)	0	1 (1)	0
(Croatia) Saša Kolić	0 (1)	0	0 (0)	0	0 (0)	0	0 (1)	0

== See also ==
- 2000–01 Prva HNL
- 2000–01 Croatian Cup
- 2000–01 UEFA Cup
