= 2002–03 HNK Rijeka season =

Rijeka
2002–03 season
- Chairman: Duško Grabovac
- Manager: Zlatko Kranjčar, Mladen Mladenović, Vjekoslav Lokica
- Prva HNL: 9th
- Croatian Cup: Round 1
- Intertoto Cup: Round 1
- Top goalscorer: League: Sandro Klić (12); All: Sandro Klić (14)
- Highest home attendance: 6,000 vs Dinamo (9 March 2003 - Prva HNL)
- Lowest home attendance: 0 vs Varteks (16 November 2002 - Prva HNL)
- Average home league attendance: 2,763

The 2002–03 season was the 57th season in Rijeka's history. It was their 12th season in the Prva HNL and 29th successive top tier season.

== Competitions ==
Competition	First match	Last match	Starting round	Final position	Record							
Competition	First match	Last match	Starting round	Final position	G	W	D	L	GF	GA	GD	Win %
Prva HNL	27 July 2002	31 May 2003	Matchday 1	9th	32	9	6	17	40	41	−1	28.13
Croatian Cup	12 September 2002	12 September 2002	First round	First round	1	0	0	1	0	1	−1	0.00
Intertoto Cup	22 June 2002	30 June 2002	First round	First round	2	1	0	1	3	3	+0	50.00
Total					35	10	6	19	43	45	−2	28.57

=== Prva HNL ===
==== First stage ====
Pos	Team	Pld	W	D	L	GF	GA	GD	Pts	Qualification
8	Osijek	22	6	5	11	21	39	−18	23	Qualification to relegation group
9	Zadar	22	5	6	11	21	40	−19	21	Qualification to relegation group
10	Rijeka	22	5	3	14	23	33	−10	18	Qualification to relegation group
11	Pomorac	22	3	8	11	26	41	−15	17	Qualification to relegation group
12	Šibenik	22	4	5	13	23	39	−16	17	Qualification to relegation group

Source: RSSSF.org
Rules for classification: 1) points; 2) goal difference; 3) number of goals scored.

==== Second stage (relegation play-off) ====
Pos	Team	Pld	W	D	L	GF	GA	GD	Pts	Relegation
7	Slaven Belupo	32	12	4	16	37	36	+1	40	
8	Osijek	32	10	9	13	32	51	−19	39	
9	Rijeka	32	9	6	17	40	41	−1	33	
10	Zadar	32	9	6	17	36	71	−35	33	
11	Pomorac (R)	32	7	11	14	42	52	−10	32	Qualification to relegation play-off
12	Šibenik (R)	32	8	7	17	37	53	−16	31	Relegation to Croatian Second Football League

Source: RSSSF.org
Rules for classification: 1) points; 2) goal difference; 3) number of goals scored.
(R) Relegated

==== Results summary ====
Overall								Home						Away					
Pld	W	D	L	GF	GA	GD	Pts	W	D	L	GF	GA	GD	W	D	L	GF	GA	GD
32	9	6	17	40	41	−1	33	9	2	5	29	13	+16	0	4	12	11	28	−17

==== Results by round ====
Round	1	2	3	4	5	6	7	8	9	10	11	12	13	14	15	16	17	18	19	20	21	22	23	24	25	26	27	28	29	30	31	32
Ground	H	A	H	A	H	H	A	H	A	H	A	A	H	A	H	A	A	H	A	H	A	H	A	A	H	A	H	H	H	A	H	A
Result	W	L	W	L	L	W	L	W	L	L	L	L	L	L	L	D	D	W	L	L	L	D	L	D	W	L	D	W	W	D	W	L
Position	1	7	3	5	7	5	7	5	8	8	8	8	8	8	8	8	9	8	9	10	10	10	10	11	10	10	12	12	10	9	9	9

Source: Competitive matches
A = Away; H = Home; W = Win; D = Draw; L = Loss

== Matches ==
=== Prva HNL ===
Round	Date	Venue	Opponent	Score	Attendance	Rijeka Scorers	Report
1	27 Jul	H	Zadar	3 – 1	3,000	Rački, Meštrović, Batkoski	HRnogomet.com
2	3 Aug	A	Hajduk Split	1 – 2	8,000	G. Brajković	HRnogomet.com
3	10 Aug	H	Zagreb	3 – 2	3,000	Rački, Klić (2)	HRnogomet.com
4	18 Aug	A	Varteks	1 – 2	4,000	Rački	HRnogomet.com
5	25 Aug	H	Osijek	0 – 1	4,500		HRnogomet.com
6	31 Aug	H	Šibenik	5 – 1	3,000	Klić (2), Vincetić, G. Brajković, Rački	HRnogomet.com
7	14 Sep	A	Kamen Ingrad	1 – 2	4,000	Shkëmbi	HRnogomet.com
8	21 Sep	H	Cibalia	2 – 1	2,000	Klić, Rački	HRnogomet.com
9	28 Sep	A	Dinamo Zagreb	1 – 2	7,000	M. Brajković	HRnogomet.com
10	5 Oct	H	Slaven Belupo	0 – 1	2,000		HRnogomet.com
11	19 Oct	A	Pomorac	0 – 1	3,000		HRnogomet.com
12	26 Oct	A	Zadar	0 – 1	2,000		HRnogomet.com
13	2 Nov	H	Hajduk Split	0 – 1	5,000		HRnogomet.com
14	9 Nov	A	Zagreb	1 – 4	1,000	G. Brajković	HRnogomet.com
15	16 Nov	H	Varteks	0 – 2	0		HRnogomet.com
16	23 Nov	A	Osijek	1 – 1	600	Klić	HRnogomet.com
17	30 Nov	A	Šibenik	0 – 0	1,000		HRnogomet.com
18	22 Feb	H	Kamen Ingrad	2 – 1	2,000	Šarić, Klić	HRnogomet.com
19	1 Mar	A	Cibalia	1 – 3	1,800	Mijatović	HRnogomet.com
20	9 Mar	H	Dinamo Zagreb	0 – 1	6,000		HRnogomet.com
21	15 Mar	A	Slaven Belupo	0 – 2	2,500		HRnogomet.com
22	22 Mar	H	Pomorac	1 – 1	1,500	Rački	HRnogomet.com
23	5 Apr	A	Zadar	1 – 2	2,500	Mijatović	HRnogomet.com
24	12 Apr	A	Šibenik	0 – 0	500		HRnogomet.com
25	19 Apr	H	Pomorac	2 – 0	2,000	Samardžić, Klić	HRnogomet.com
26	26 Apr	A	Slaven Belupo	0 – 2	2,000		HRnogomet.com
27	3 May	H	Osijek	0 – 0	1,200		HRnogomet.com
28	7 May	H	Zadar	7 – 0	3,000	Skočibušić, Samardžić, Klić (2), M. Brajković, Rački (2)	HRnogomet.com
29	10 May	H	Šibenik	2 – 0	4,000	Klić, Mijatović	HRnogomet.com
30	17 May	A	Pomorac	1 – 1	3,000	Samardžić	HRnogomet.com
31	24 May	H	Slaven Belupo	2 – 0	2,000	Klić, Čaval	HRnogomet.com
32	31 May	A	Osijek	2 – 3	300	G. Brajković (2)	HRnogomet.com

Source: HRnogomet.com

=== Croatian Cup ===
Round	Date	Venue	Opponent	Score	Attendance	Rijeka Scorers	Report
R1	12 Sep	A	Grafičar Vodovod	0 – 1	600		HRnogomet.com

Source: HRnogomet.com

=== Intertoto Cup ===
Round	Date	Venue	Opponent	Score	Attendance	Rijeka Scorers	Report
R1	22 Jun	H	St Patrick's Athletic (Republic of Ireland)	3 – 2	3,000	Vincetić, Klić (2)	HRnogomet.com
R1	30 Jun	A	St Patrick's Athletic (Republic of Ireland)	0 – 1	3,000		HRnogomet.com

Source: HRnogomet.com

=== Squad statistics ===
Competitive matches only.
Appearances in brackets indicate numbers of times the player came on as a substitute.

Name	Apps	Goals	Apps	Goals	Apps	Goals	Apps	Goals
Name	League		Cup		Europe		Total	
(Croatia) Đoni Tafra	18 (0)	0	1 (0)	0	1 (0)	0	20 (0)	0
(Croatia) Matko Kalinić	14 (0)	0	0 (0)	0	1 (0)	0	15 (0)	0
(Croatia) Andre Mijatović	20 (0)	3	0 (0)	0	1 (0)	0	21 (0)	3
(North Macedonia) Naum Batkoski	15 (7)	1	0 (0)	0	0 (0)	0	15 (7)	1
(Croatia) Mate Lacić	10 (0)	0	1 (0)	0	0 (0)	0	11 (0)	0
(Croatia) Goran Vincetić	26 (1)	1	1 (0)	0	2 (0)	1	29 (1)	2
(Croatia) Mladen Ivančić	7 (7)	0	1 (0)	0	2 (0)	0	10 (7)	0
(Croatia) Stjepan Skočibušić	23 (2)	1	1 (0)	0	2 (0)	0	26 (2)	1
(Croatia) Goran Brajković	12 (10)	5	0 (0)	0	2 (0)	0	14 (10)	5
(Croatia) Natko Rački	19 (6)	8	1 (0)	0	2 (0)	0	22 (6)	8
(Croatia) Mate Brajković	8 (12)	2	0 (0)	0	1 (1)	0	9 (13)	2
(Croatia) Mario Meštrović	10 (1)	1	0 (0)	0	2 (0)	0	12 (1)	1
(Croatia) Siniša Linić	17 (2)	0	0 (1)	0	0 (0)	0	18 (3)	0
(Croatia) Jasmin Samardžić	11 (3)	3	0 (0)	0	0 (0)	0	11 (3)	3
(Croatia) Kristijan Čaval	17 (7)	1	1 (0)	0	2 (0)	0	20 (7)	1
(Albania) Bledi Shkëmbi	21 (2)	1	1 (0)	0	2 (0)	0	24 (2)	1
(Croatia) Damir Milinović	12 (0)	0	0 (0)	0	0 (0)	0	12 (0)	0
(Croatia) Sandro Klić	25 (4)	12	1 (0)	0	1 (1)	2	27 (5)	14
(Bosnia and Herzegovina) Ibrahim Duro	13 (0)	0	0 (0)	0	0 (0)	0	13 (0)	0
(Argentina) Martin Šarić	17 (1)	1	1 (0)	0	0 (0)	0	18 (1)	1
(Croatia) Vedran Celiščak	6 (5)	0	1 (0)	0	0 (0)	0	7 (5)	0
(Croatia) Dario Knežević	7 (0)	0	0 (0)	0	0 (0)	0	7 (0)	0
(North Macedonia) Miroslav Vajs	10 (0)	0	0 (0)	0	0 (1)	0	10 (1)	0
(Croatia) Marin Mikac	1 (11)	0	0 (1)	0	0 (2)	0	1 (14)	0
(Bosnia and Herzegovina) Sejad Halilović	6 (3)	0	0 (0)	0	0 (0)	0	6 (3)	0
(Croatia) Josip Modrić	3 (3)	0	0 (0)	0	0 (1)	0	3 (4)	0
(Croatia) Josip Butić	3 (3)	0	0 (0)	0	0 (0)	0	3 (3)	0
(Croatia) Anton Rukavina	0 (1)	0	0 (0)	0	0 (0)	0	0 (1)	0
(Croatia) Ivan Sertić	0 (1)	0	0 (0)	0	0 (0)	0	0 (1)	0

== See also ==
- 2002–03 Prva HNL
- 2002–03 Croatian Cup
- 2002 UEFA Intertoto Cup
