= 1999–2000 HNK Rijeka season =

Rijeka
1999–2000 season
- Chairman: Žarko Tomljanović, Ivan Vanja Frančišković, Robert Ježić
- Manager: Nenad Gračan
- Prva HNL: 4th
- Croatian Cup: Quarterfinal
- UEFA Champions League: Qualifying Round 2
- Top goalscorer: League: Boško Balaban (16); All: Boško Balaban (17)
- Highest home attendance: 10,500 vs Partizan (4 August 1999 - UEFA Champions League)
- Lowest home attendance: 1,000 (2 times - Prva HNL)
- Average home league attendance: 3,041

The 1999–2000 season was the 54th season in Rijeka's history. It was their 9th season in the Prva HNL and 26th successive top tier season.

== Competitions ==
Competition	First match	Last match	Starting round	Final position	Record							
Competition	First match	Last match	Starting round	Final position	G	W	D	L	GF	GA	GD	Win %
Prva HNL	24 July 1999	13 May 2000	Matchday 1	4th	33	14	7	12	54	39	+15	42.42
Croatian Cup	22 September 1999	21 March 2000	First round	Quarterfinal	4	2	1	1	6	5	+1	50.00
Champions League	28 July 1999	4 August 1999	QR2	QR2	2	0	0	2	1	6	−5	0.00
Total					39	16	8	15	61	50	+11	41.03

=== Prva HNL ===
==== Classification ====
Pos	Team	Pld	W	D	L	GF	GA	GD	Pts	Qualification or relegation
2	Hajduk Split	33	17	10	6	58	30	+28	61	Qualification to Champions League second qualifying round
3	Osijek	33	15	8	10	55	49	+6	53	Qualification to UEFA Cup first round
4	Rijeka	33	14	7	12	54	39	+15	49	Qualification to UEFA Cup qualifying round
5	Slaven Belupo	33	12	13	8	34	34	0	49	Qualification to Intertoto Cup first round
6	Cibalia	33	11	12	10	42	39	+3	45	Qualification to Intertoto Cup first round

Source: RSSSF.org
Rules for classification: 1st points; 2nd goal difference; 3rd goals scored
For deciding champions, qualification to UEFA competitions and relegation: 1st points; 2nd head-to-head points; 3rd head-to-head goal difference; 4th head-to-head away goals scored

==== Results summary ====
Overall								Home						Away					
Pld	W	D	L	GF	GA	GD	Pts	W	D	L	GF	GA	GD	W	D	L	GF	GA	GD
33	14	7	12	54	39	+15	49	11	2	4	36	16	+20	3	5	8	18	23	−5

==== Results by round ====
Round	1	2	3	4	5	6	7	8	9	10	11	12	13	14	15	16	17	18	19	20	21	22	23	24	25	26	27	28	29	30	31	32	33
Ground	H	A	H	A	H	A	H	H	A	H	A	A	H	A	H	A	H	A	A	H	A	H	H	A	H	A	H	H	A	H	A	H	A
Result	L	W	L	D	W	W	L	W	D	W	D	L	W	L	W	L	W	D	L	W	L	D	D	L	W	D	L	W	L	W	L	W	W
Position	10	4	9	9	4	4	4	4	4	3	4	4	4	4	4	4	4	4	4	4	4	4	4	4	4	4	4	4	5	4	5	4	4

Source: Competitive matches
A = Away; H = Home; W = Win; D = Draw; L = Loss

== Matches ==
=== Prva HNL ===
Round	Date	Venue	Opponent	Score	Attendance	Rijeka Scorers	Report
1	24 Jul	H	Osijek	0 – 1	5,000		HRnogomet.com
2	31 Jul	AR	Hrvatski Dragovoljac	4 – 0	1,500	Balaban (3), Milinović	HRnogomet.com
3	29 Aug	H	Hajduk Split	1 – 2	7,000	Agić	HRnogomet.com
4	7 Sep	A	Croatia Zagreb	1 – 1	2,000	Milinović	HRnogomet.com
5	11 Sep	H	Varteks	2 – 0	4,000	Višković, Balaban	HRnogomet.com
6	18 Sep	A	Šibenik	2 – 0	1,000	Skočibušić, Brajković	HRnogomet.com
7	26 Sep	H	Cibalia	1 – 3	4,000	Balaban	HRnogomet.com
8	2 Oct	H	Istra	4 – 1	3,000	Hasančić, Milicic (2), Balaban	HRnogomet.com
9	12 Oct	A	Vukovar '91	0 – 0	500		HRnogomet.com
10	16 Oct	H	Zagreb	2 – 0	2,000	Balaban, Sztipánovics	HRnogomet.com
11	22 Oct	A	Slaven Belupo	2 – 2	1,500	Balaban, Agić	HRnogomet.com
12	30 Oct	A	Osijek	2 – 3	1,000	Agić, Hasančić	HRnogomet.com
13	6 Nov	H	Hrvatski Dragovoljac	4 – 2	1,500	Balaban (3), Hasančić	HRnogomet.com
14	23 Nov	A	Hajduk Split	2 – 3	5,000	Sztipánovics, Balaban	HRnogomet.com
15	27 Nov	H	Croatia Zagreb	3 – 1	6,000	Balaban (2), Sztipánovics	HRnogomet.com
16	4 Dec	A	Varteks	1 – 2	1,500	Hasančić	HRnogomet.com
17	19 Feb	H	Šibenik	3 – 1	2,500	Sztipánovics (2), Čaval	HRnogomet.com
18	26 Feb	A	Cibalia	0 – 0	1,500		HRnogomet.com
19	29 Feb	A	Istra	0 – 1	4,000		HRnogomet.com
20	4 Mar	H	Vukovar '91	2 – 0	1,200	Balaban, Hasančić	HRnogomet.com
21	7 Mar	A	Zagreb	1 – 4	800	Hasančić	HRnogomet.com
22	11 Mar	H	Slaven Belupo	1 – 1	1,000	o.g.	HRnogomet.com
23	18 Mar	H	Vukovar '91	0 – 0	1,500		HRnogomet.com
24	25 Mar	A	Istra	1 – 2	4,500	Čačić	HRnogomet.com
25	1 Apr	H	Šibenik	2 – 0	1,000	o.g. (2)	HRnogomet.com
26	8 Apr	A	Cibalia	1 – 1	500	Balaban	HRnogomet.com
27	11 Apr	H	Zagreb	2 – 3	500	Milicic (2)	HRnogomet.com
28	15 Apr	H	Varteks	4 – 0	1,500	Čaval, Milicic, Milinović, Mijatović	HRnogomet.com
29	24 Apr	A	Osijek	0 – 2	2,500		HRnogomet.com
30	29 Apr	H	Hajduk Split	2 – 0	6,000	o.g., Hasančić	HRnogomet.com
31	6 May	A	Dinamo Zagreb	0 – 2	1,000		HRnogomet.com
32	9 May	H	Slaven Belupo	3 – 1	4,000	Hasančić (3)	HRnogomet.com
33	13 May	AR	Hrvatski Dragovoljac	1 – 0	700	Mijatović	HRnogomet.com

Source: HRnogomet.com

=== Croatian Cup ===
Round	Date	Venue	Opponent	Score	Attendance	Rijeka Scorers	Report
R1	22 Sep	A	Radnik	2 – 1	500	Sztipánovics, Hasančić	HRnogomet.com
R2	26 Oct	A	Nehaj Senj	1 – 0 (aet)	1,500	Hasančić	HRnogomet.com
QF	14 Mar	H	Dinamo Zagreb	1 – 2	6,000	Balaban	HRnogomet.com
QF	21 Mar	A	Dinamo Zagreb	2 – 2	1,500	Brajković (2)	HRnogomet.com

Source: HRnogomet.com

=== UEFA Champions League ===
Round	Date	Venue	Opponent	Score	Attendance	Rijeka Scorers	Report
QR2	28 Jul	A	Partizan (Serbia and Montenegro)	1 – 3	21,800	Sztipánovics	HRnogomet.com
QR2	4 Aug	H	Partizan (Serbia and Montenegro)	0 – 3	10,500		HRnogomet.com

Source: HRnogomet.com

=== Squad statistics ===
Competitive matches only.
Appearances in brackets indicate numbers of times the player came on as a substitute.

Name	Apps	Goals	Apps	Goals	Apps	Goals	Apps	Goals
Name	League		Cup		Europe		Total	
(Croatia) Đoni Tafra	30 (0)	0	1 (0)	0	2 (0)	0	33 (0)	0
(Croatia) Damir Milinović	24 (0)	3	2 (0)	0	2 (0)	0	28 (0)	3
(Croatia) Andre Mijatović	21 (0)	2	3 (0)	0	0 (0)	0	24 (0)	2
(Croatia) Dalibor Višković	22 (2)	1	4 (0)	0	2 (0)	0	28 (2)	1
(Croatia) Jasmin Agić	28 (0)	3	4 (0)	0	2 (0)	0	34 (0)	3
(Croatia) Božidar Čačić	21 (0)	1	2 (0)	0	2 (0)	0	25 (0)	1
(Croatia) Stjepan Skočibušić	13 (3)	1	2 (1)	0	0 (0)	0	15 (4)	1
(Croatia) Goran Brajković	31 (0)	1	4 (0)	2	2 (0)	0	37 (0)	3
(Bosnia and Herzegovina) Admir Hasančić	24 (1)	10	3 (1)	2	2 (0)	0	29 (2)	12
(Croatia) Damir Matulović	28 (2)	0	3 (0)	0	0 (1)	0	31 (3)	0
(Hungary) Barnabás Sztipánovics	29 (1)	5	3 (0)	1	2 (0)	1	34 (1)	7
(Croatia) Mauro Tomišić	19 (2)	0	3 (0)	0	2 (0)	0	24 (2)	0
(Croatia) Boško Balaban	29 (0)	16	3 (0)	1	2 (0)	0	34 (0)	17
(Australia) Ante Milicic	8 (14)	5	2 (1)	0	0 (0)	0	10 (15)	5
(Croatia) Boris Pavić	14 (5)	0	1 (1)	0	0 (1)	0	15 (7)	0
(Croatia) Kristijan Čaval	6 (5)	2	0 (0)	0	0 (0)	0	6 (5)	2
(Croatia) Kazimir Vulić	7 (4)	0	0 (1)	0	0 (0)	0	7 (5)	0
(Croatia) Stipe Režić	4 (3)	0	1 (0)	0	0 (0)	0	5 (3)	0
(Croatia) Darko Horvat	3 (0)	0	2 (0)	0	0 (0)	0	5 (0)	0
(Croatia) Vedran Peteh	1 (2)	0	0 (2)	0	0 (0)	0	1 (4)	0
(Croatia) Sandro Klić	0 (4)	0	0 (0)	0	0 (0)	0	0 (4)	0
(Croatia) Siniša Linić	0 (2)	0	0 (0)	0	0 (0)	0	0 (2)	0
(Croatia) Nenad Matković	0 (0)	0	0 (0)	0	2 (0)	0	2 (0)	0
(Croatia) Mario Strilić	0 (2)	0	0 (0)	0	0 (0)	0	0 (2)	0
(Croatia) Vanja Iveša	0 (0)	0	1 (0)	0	0 (0)	0	1 (0)	0
(Croatia) Josip Modrić	0 (1)	0	0 (0)	0	0 (1)	0	0 (2)	0
(Brazil) Sérgio De Oliveira	0 (1)	0	0 (0)	0	0 (1)	0	0 (2)	0
(Croatia) Dalibor Pauletić	2 (3)	0	0 (0)	0	0 (0)	0	2 (3)	0
(Croatia) Zdravko Šimić	0 (1)	0	0 (0)	0	0 (0)	0	0 (1)	0
(Croatia) Igor Bernobić	0 (1)	0	0 (0)	0	0 (0)	0	0 (1)	0

== See also ==
- 1999–2000 Prva HNL
- 1999–2000 Croatian Cup
- 1999–2000 UEFA Champions League
