= 2003–04 HNK Rijeka season =

Rijeka
2003–04 season
- Chairman: Robert Ježić
- Manager: Ivan Katalinić
- Prva HNL: 3rd
- Croatian Cup: Semifinal
- Top goalscorer: League: Sandro Klić (11); All: Sandro Klić (13)
- Highest home attendance: 7,000 vs Dinamo and Hajduk (3 Sep and 20 Sep 2003 - Prva HNL)
- Lowest home attendance: 500 vs Zagreb (29 October 2003 - Croatian Cup)
- Average home league attendance: 2,813

The 2003–04 season was the 58th season in Rijeka's history. It was their 13th season in the Prva HNL and 30th successive top tier season.

== Competitions ==
| Competition | First match | Last match | Starting round | Final position | Record | | | | | | | |
| Competition | First match | Last match | Starting round | Final position | G | W | D | L | GF | GA | GD | Win % |
|---|---|---|---|---|---|---|---|---|---|---|---|---|
| Prva HNL | 24 July 2003 | 15 May 2004 | Matchday 1 | 3rd | 32 | 11 | 9 | 12 | 36 | 41 | −5 | 34.38 |
| Croatian Cup | 17 September 2003 | 14 April 2004 | First round | Semifinal | 6 | 5 | 0 | 1 | 18 | 7 | +11 | 83.33 |
| Total | | | | | 38 | 16 | 9 | 13 | 54 | 48 | +6 | 42.11 |

=== Prva HNL ===
==== First stage ====
| Pos | Team | Pld | W | D | L | GF | GA | GD | Pts | Qualification |
|---|---|---|---|---|---|---|---|---|---|---|
| 1 | Hajduk Split | 22 | 18 | 1 | 3 | 46 | 18 | +28 | 55 | Qualification to championship group |
| 2 | Dinamo Zagreb | 22 | 15 | 5 | 2 | 47 | 16 | +31 | 50 | Qualification to championship group |
| 3 | Rijeka | 22 | 8 | 7 | 7 | 26 | 25 | +1 | 31 | Qualification to championship group |
| 4 | Osijek | 22 | 8 | 5 | 9 | 36 | 40 | −4 | 29 (Note: Head-to-head record: Osijek–Varteks 3–1, Varteks–Osijek 1–1.) | Qualification to championship group |
| 5 | Varteks | 22 | 7 | 8 | 7 | 21 | 25 | −4 | 29 | Qualification to championship group |

Source: RSSSF.org
Rules for classification: 1) points; 2) goal difference; 3) number of goals scored.

==== Second stage (championship play-off) ====
| Pos | Team | Pld | W | D | L | GF | GA | GD | Pts | Qualification |
|---|---|---|---|---|---|---|---|---|---|---|
| 1 | Hajduk Split (C) | 32 | 25 | 3 | 4 | 63 | 24 | +39 | 78 | Qualification to Champions League second qualifying round |
| 2 | Dinamo Zagreb | 32 | 23 | 7 | 2 | 77 | 25 | +52 | 76 | Qualification to UEFA Cup second qualifying round |
| 3 | Rijeka | 32 | 11 | 9 | 12 | 36 | 41 | −5 | 42 | Qualification to UEFA Cup second qualifying round |
| 4 | Osijek | 32 | 11 | 6 | 15 | 50 | 57 | −7 | 39 | |
| 5 | Varteks | 32 | 9 | 11 | 12 | 33 | 42 | −9 | 38 | |
| 6 | Zadar | 32 | 7 | 11 | 14 | 46 | 71 | −25 | 32 | |

Source: RSSSF.org
Rules for classification: 1) points; 2) goal difference; 3) number of goals scored.
(C) Champions

==== Results summary ====
| Overall | | | | | | | | Home | | | | | | Away | | | | | |
| Pld | W | D | L | GF | GA | GD | Pts | W | D | L | GF | GA | GD | W | D | L | GF | GA | GD |
|---|---|---|---|---|---|---|---|---|---|---|---|---|---|---|---|---|---|---|---|
| 32 | 11 | 9 | 12 | 36 | 41 | −5 | 42 | 8 | 2 | 6 | 20 | 13 | +7 | 3 | 7 | 6 | 16 | 28 | −12 |

==== Results by round ====
| Round | 1 | 2 | 3 | 4 | 5 | 6 | 7 | 8 | 9 | 10 | 11 | 12 | 13 | 14 | 15 | 16 | 17 | 18 | 19 | 20 | 21 | 22 | 23 | 24 | 25 | 26 | 27 | 28 | 29 | 30 | 31 | 32 |
|---|---|---|---|---|---|---|---|---|---|---|---|---|---|---|---|---|---|---|---|---|---|---|---|---|---|---|---|---|---|---|---|---|
| Ground | H | A | H | A | H | H | A | H | A | H | A | A | H | A | H | A | A | H | A | H | A | H | H | A | H | A | H | A | H | A | H | A |
| Result | L | D | D | D | W | W | D | L | D | L | D | W | D | L | W | L | W | W | L | W | W | L | W | D | L | L | W | L | W | L | L | D |
| Position | 9 | 8 | 9 | 11 | 7 | 3 | 4 | 6 | 6 | 9 | 6 | 5 | 5 | 6 | 5 | 7 | 6 | 4 | 4 | 4 | 3 | 3 | 3 | 3 | 4 | 4 | 3 | 4 | 3 | 3 | 3 | 3 |

Source: Competitive matches
A = Away; H = Home; W = Win; D = Draw; L = Loss

== Matches ==
=== Prva HNL ===
| Round | Date | Venue | Opponent | Score | Attendance | Rijeka Scorers | Report |
|---|---|---|---|---|---|---|---|
| 1 | 24 Jul | H | Cibalia | 0 – 1 | 2,700 | | HRnogomet.com |
| 2 | 2 Aug | A | Varteks | 1 – 1 | 3,000 | Klić | HRnogomet.com |
| 4 | 16 Aug | A | Marsonia | 1 – 1 | 3,000 | Samardžić | HRnogomet.com |
| 5 | 24 Aug | H | Zadar | 4 – 2 | 3,000 | Klić (2), Samardžić, Vidović | HRnogomet.com |
| 6 | 30 Aug | H | Osijek | 2 – 0 | 3,000 | Duro, Klić | HRnogomet.com |
| 3 | 3 Sep | H | Dinamo Zagreb | 0 – 0 | 7,000 | | HRnogomet.com |
| 7 | 13 Sep | A | Slaven Belupo | 1 – 1 | 1,500 | Samardžić | HRnogomet.com |
| 8 | 20 Sep | H | Hajduk Split | 1 – 2 | 7,000 | Klić | HRnogomet.com |
| 9 | 27 Sep | A | Zagreb | 1 – 1 | 1,000 | Klić | HRnogomet.com |
| 10 | 4 Oct | H | Kamen Ingrad | 1 – 2 | 1,500 | Tiganj | HRnogomet.com |
| 11 | 18 Oct | A | Inker Zaprešić | 1 – 1 | 1,500 | Vušković | HRnogomet.com |
| 12 | 25 Oct | A | Cibalia | 1 – 0 | 600 | Milas | HRnogomet.com |
| 13 | 2 Nov | H | Varteks | 0 – 0 | 2,000 | | HRnogomet.com |
| 14 | 9 Nov | A | Dinamo Zagreb | 0 – 2 | 2,000 | | HRnogomet.com |
| 15 | 22 Nov | H | Marsonia | 3 – 1 | 1,000 | Butić, Klić, Vidović | HRnogomet.com |
| 16 | 29 Nov | A | Zadar | 2 – 3 | 1,200 | Klić, Vidović | HRnogomet.com |
| 17 | 6 Dec | A | Osijek | 3 – 2 | 2,000 | Butić, Čaval, Ah. Sharbini | HRnogomet.com |
| 18 | 21 Feb | H | Slaven Belupo | 2 – 0 | 800 | Milinović, Čaval | HRnogomet.com |
| 19 | 28 Feb | A | Hajduk Split | 0 – 4 | 4,500 | | HRnogomet.com |
| 20 | 6 Mar | H | Zagreb | 1 – 0 | 1,500 | Vidović | HRnogomet.com |
| 21 | 13 Mar | A | Kamen Ingrad | 1 – 0 | 2,500 | Ah. Sharbini | HRnogomet.com |
| 22 | 20 Mar | H | Inker Zaprešić | 0 – 1 | 2,000 | | HRnogomet.com |
| 23 | 27 Mar | H | Osijek | 2 – 1 | 2,000 | Ah. Sharbini, Vidović | HRnogomet.com |
| 24 | 3 Apr | A | Varteks | 1 – 1 | 2,500 | Linić | HRnogomet.com |
| 25 | 10 Apr | H | Hajduk Split | 0 – 1 | 5,000 | | HRnogomet.com |
| 26 | 17 Apr | A | Dinamo Zagreb | 0 – 5 | 1,500 | | HRnogomet.com |
| 27 | 21 Apr | H | Zadar | 3 – 1 | 1,000 | Klić, Samardžić, Tadić | HRnogomet.com |
| 28 | 24 Apr | A | Osijek | 1 – 2 | 2,000 | Samardžić | HRnogomet.com |
| 29 | 1 May | H | Varteks | 1 – 0 | 1,000 | Vidović | HRnogomet.com |
| 30 | 8 May | A | Hajduk Split | 0 – 2 | 4,000 | | HRnogomet.com |
| 31 | 12 May | H | Dinamo Zagreb | 0 – 1 | 4,500 | | HRnogomet.com |
| 32 | 15 May | A | Zadar | 2 – 2 | 500 | Klić (2) | HRnogomet.com |

Source: HRnogomet.com

=== Croatian Cup ===
| Round | Date | Venue | Opponent | Score | Attendance | Rijeka Scorers | Report |
|---|---|---|---|---|---|---|---|
| R1 | 17 Sep | A | Nehaj Senj | 7 – 1 | 1,000 | Ah. Sharbini (2), Klić (2), Shkëmbi, Tiganj, Vidović | HRnogomet.com |
| R2 | 29 Oct | H | Zagreb | 3 – 0 | 500 | Shkëmbi, Vidović, Ah. Sharbini | HRnogomet.com |
| QF | 16 Mar | A | Kamen Ingrad | 3 – 2 | 500 | Samardžić, Čaval, Novaković | HRnogomet.com |
| QF | 24 Mar | H | Kamen Ingrad | 2 – 0 | 600 | Samardžić (2) | HRnogomet.com |
| SF | 7 Apr | A | Dinamo Zagreb | 2 – 4 | 1,000 | Linić, Vidović | HRnogomet.com |
| SF | 14 Apr | H | Dinamo Zagreb | 1 – 0 | 6,000 | Bulat | HRnogomet.com |

Source: HRnogomet.com

=== Squad statistics ===
Competitive matches only.
Appearances in brackets indicate numbers of times the player came on as a substitute.

| Name | Apps | Goals | Apps | Goals | Apps | Goals |
| Name | League | | Cup | | Total | |
|---|---|---|---|---|---|---|
| (Croatia) Matko Kalinić | 23 (0) | 0 | 5 (0) | 0 | 28 (0) | 0 |
| (Croatia) Damir Milinović | 29 (0) | 1 | 5 (0) | 0 | 34 (0) | 1 |
| (Croatia) Josip Bulat | 20 (2) | 0 | 5 (1) | 1 | 25 (3) | 1 |
| (Croatia) Danijel Vušković | 20 (1) | 1 | 3 (0) | 0 | 23 (1) | 1 |
| (Croatia) Daniel Šarić | 23 (1) | 0 | 5 (1) | 0 | 28 (2) | 0 |
| (Croatia) Siniša Linić | 13 (15) | 1 | 3 (1) | 1 | 16 (16) | 2 |
| (Croatia) Jasmin Samardžić | 20 (7) | 5 | 4 (0) | 3 | 24 (7) | 8 |
| (Croatia) Kristijan Čaval | 24 (0) | 2 | 4 (0) | 1 | 28 (0) | 3 |
| (Albania) Bledi Shkëmbi | 15 (0) | 0 | 1 (1) | 2 | 16 (1) | 2 |
| (Croatia) Ivan Milas | 21 (4) | 1 | 3 (0) | 0 | 24 (4) | 1 |
| (Croatia) Sandro Klić | 18 (7) | 11 | 1 (1) | 2 | 19 (8) | 13 |
| (Croatia) Dragan Tadić | 7 (10) | 1 | 2 (1) | 0 | 8 (11) | 1 |
| (Bosnia and Herzegovina) Jasmin Mujdža | 18 (0) | 0 | 6 (0) | 0 | 24 (0) | 0 |
| (Croatia) Dario Knežević | 21 (1) | 0 | 6 (0) | 0 | 27 (1) | 0 |
| (Croatia) Josip Butić | 23 (5) | 2 | 2 (0) | 0 | 25 (5) | 2 |
| (Bosnia and Herzegovina) Rajko Vidović | 14 (9) | 6 | 5 (1) | 3 | 19 (10) | 9 |
| (Croatia) Ahmad Sharbini | 9 (9) | 3 | 2 (3) | 3 | 11 (12) | 6 |
| (North Macedonia) Naum Batkoski | 9 (3) | 0 | 0 (0) | 0 | 9 (3) | 0 |
| (Croatia) Tihomir Bulat | 9 (0) | 0 | 0 (1) | 0 | 9 (1) | 0 |
| (Croatia) Igor Novaković | 1 (7) | 0 | 0 (3) | 1 | 1 (10) | 1 |
| (Slovenia) Senad Tiganj | 3 (4) | 1 | 1 (1) | 1 | 4 (5) | 2 |
| (Croatia) Jurica Karabatić | 5 (2) | 0 | 2 (2) | 0 | 7 (4) | 0 |
| (Bosnia and Herzegovina) Ibrahim Duro | 4 (1) | 1 | 0 (0) | 0 | 4 (1) | 1 |
| (Croatia) Josip Modrić | 0 (2) | 0 | 0 (0) | 0 | 0 (2) | 0 |
| (Argentina) Martin Šarić | 2 (2) | 0 | 0 (1) | 0 | 2 (3) | 0 |
| (Croatia) Leonard Bisaku | 1 (0) | 0 | 0 (0) | 0 | 1 (0) | 0 |

== See also ==
- 2003–04 Prva HNL
- 2003–04 Croatian Cup
