= Mate Brajković =

Croatian footballer

Personal information
- Full name: Mate Brajković
- Date of birth: 18 June 1981 (age 45)
- Place of birth: Sombor, SR Serbia, SFR Yugoslavia
- Height: 1.74 m (5 ft 9 in)
- Position: Striker

Senior career*
Years	Team	Apps	(Gls)
2000–2003	Rijeka	53	(7)
2003–2004	Zadar	28	(11)
2004–2005	Admira Wacker Mödling	17	(0)
2005–2007	Kamen Ingrad	45	(8)
2007–2008	Rijeka	20	(1)
2008–2009	Flamurtari	36	(10)
2010–2011	Crikvenica	44	(29)
2011–2012	Pomorac	0	(0)
2012–2013	Krk	4	(1)
2013–2015	Crikvenica		
2015–2016	NK Turbina		
2016–2017	Crikvenica		
2017–2018	NK Turbina		

International career^{‡}
2002	Croatia U21	3	(0)
- * Club domestic league appearances and goals as of 22 February 2017 ‡ National team caps and goals as of 17 July 2008

Mate Brajković (born 18 June 1981 in Sombor) is a Croatian retired football player. The striker last played for NK Turbina.

== Career statistics ==
Club	Season	League		League	Cup		Continental		Total	
Club	Season	Apps	Goals	League	Apps	Goals	Apps	Goals	Apps	Goals
HNK Rijeka	2000–01	1. HNL	6	0	0	0	–		6	0
HNK Rijeka	2001–02	1. HNL	27	5	3	0	–		30	5
HNK Rijeka	2002–03	1. HNL	20	2	0	0	2	0	22	2
NK Zadar	2003–04	1. HNL	28	12	1	0	–		29	12
Admira Wacker Mödling	2004–05	Austrian Bundesliga	17	0	–		–		17	0
Kamen Ingrad	2005–06	1. HNL	27	5	6	4	–		33	9
Kamen Ingrad	2006–07	1. HNL	17	3	1	1	–		18	4
Kamen Ingrad total			44	8	7	5	0	0	51	13
HNK Rijeka	2006–07	1. HNL	11	1	–		–		11	1
HNK Rijeka	2007–08	1. HNL	10	0	1	0	–		11	0
HNK Rijeka total			74	20	4	0	2	0	80	20
Total			163	40	12	5	2	0	177	45
Last Update: 6 January 2018.
