= Mikac =

Mikac is a surname. Notable people with the surname include:

- Marin Mikac (born 1982), Croatian football manager
- Walter Mikac (born 1962), Australian activist
