= Branko Čalović =

Yugoslav footballer

Personal information
- Date of birth: 23 December 1941
- Place of birth: Nikšić, Yugoslavia
- Date of death: 24 July 1995 (aged 53)
- Place of death: Rijeka, Croatia
- Position(s): Midfielder

Senior career*
| Years | Team | Apps | (Gls) |
| 1959–1967 | Sutjeska | | |
| 1967–1969 | Rijeka | 61 | (2) |
| 1971–1975 | Orijent | | |
- AA Gent
- *Club domestic league appearances and goals

Branko Čalović (23 December 1941 – 24 July 1995) was a Yugoslav professional footballer, who played as a midfielder. He started his career in FK Sutjeska Nikšić in 1959. Later on he played for HNK Rijeka, NK Orijent and KAA Gent.

Čalović was voted "Top 10 most successful athletes of Montenegro" from 1960 to 1970.

== See also ==
- List of HNK Rijeka players
