= Goran Brajković =

Croatian footballer

Personal information
- Date of birth: 18 July 1978
- Place of birth: Zagreb, SR Croatia, SFR Yugoslavia
- Date of death: 28 June 2015 (aged 36)
- Place of death: Matulji, Croatia
- Height: 1.80 m (5 ft 11 in)
- Position: Midfielder

Senior career*
Years	Team	Apps	(Gls)
1998–2003	Rijeka	131	(9)
2003–2004	Arsenal Kyiv	6	(0)
2003	→ CSKA Kyiv	1	(0)
2004	Pomorac	11	(0)
2005–2007	Bela Krajina	25	(3)
2007–2008	HK	14	(0)
2008–2009	Flamurtari Vlorë	6	(0)
2009	Kastoria	3	(0)
2009–2014	Opatija	33	(7)
2011	→ USV Dechantskirchen (loan)	12	(2)

International career^{‡}
1998	Croatia U20	1	(1)
1999–2000	Croatia U21	11	(0)
2001	Croatia	2	(0)
- * Club domestic league appearances and goals as of 19 October 2002 ‡ National team caps and goals as of 13 November 2001

Goran Brajković (18 July 1978 – 28 June 2015) was a Croatian footballer.

== Club career ==
Brajković started off his career at HNK Rijeka in 1998 and played for several clubs in different countries. The midfielder last played for Opatija in Croatian Third Football League and was loaned out to an Austrian amateur side in 2011.

== International career ==
He made his debut for Croatia in a March 2001 friendly match away against South Korea and earned his second and final cap three days later against the same opposition.

== Personal life ==
=== Death ===
He died on 28 June 2015 in a motorcycle accident in Matulji.

== Honours ==
=== Flamurtari Vlorë ===
- Albanian Cup: 2009

== Career statistics ==
Club	Season	League	League		Cup		Europe		Total	
Club	Season	League	Apps	Goals	Apps	Goals	Apps	Goals	Apps	Goals
HNK Rijeka	1998–99	1. HNL	25	0	2	0	–		27	0
HNK Rijeka	1999–00	1. HNL	31	2	4	2	2	0	37	4
HNK Rijeka	2000–01	1. HNL	26	1	1	0	4	1	31	2
HNK Rijeka	2001–02	1. HNL	27	1	3	1	–		30	2
HNK Rijeka	2002–03	1. HNL	22	5	0	0	2	0	24	5
Arsenal Kyiv	2003–04	Vyshcha Liha	6	0	0	0	–		6	0
Pomorac Kostrena	2004–05	2. HNL (South)	11	0	0	0	–		11	0
Bela Krajina	2004–05	PrvaLiga	14	2	0	0	–		14	2
Bela Krajina	2005–06	PrvaLiga	–		–		–		0	0
Bela Krajina	2006–07	PrvaLiga	–		–		–		0	0
Bela Krajina	2007–08	2. SNL	11	1	2	0	–		13	1
HK Kópavogur	2008	Úrvalsdeild karla	14	0	0	0	–		14	2
Flamurtari Vlorë	2008–09	Albanian Superliga	6	0	7	0	–		13	0
Kastoria F.C.	2009–10	Beta Ethniki	3	0	–		–		3	0
HNK Rijeka total			131	9	10	3	8	1	149	13
Bela Krajina total			25	3	2	0	0	0	27	3
Career total			196	12	19	3	8	1	223	16
