= Mate Lacić =

Croatian footballer (born 1980)

Personal information
- Full name: Mate Lacić
- Date of birth: 12 September 1980 (age 46)
- Place of birth: Split, SR Croatia, Yugoslavia
- Height: 1.86 m (6 ft 1 in)
- Position: Centre-back

Youth career
- Mosor

Senior career*
Years	Team	Apps	(Gls)
1999–2000	RNK Split		
2000–2002	1860 München II	19	(2)
2002–2003	Rijeka	10	(0)
2003–2004	Široki Brijeg	33	(0)
2004–2005	Posušje	26	(0)
2005–2006	Maccabi Netanya	5	(0)
2006–2007	Dyskobolia	38	(1)
2008–2009	Zagłębie Lubin	27	(0)
2009–2013	Bełchatów	97	(3)
2013	Cracovia	0	(0)
- * Club domestic league appearances and goals

Mate Lacić (born 12 September 1980) is a Croatian former professional footballer who played as a centre-back.

== Club career ==
Lacić signed a two-year contract with German side 1860 München in summer 2000.

After retiring as a player, he worked as a scout for Polish side Legia Warsaw.

== Honours ==
Široki Brijeg

- Premier League of Bosnia and Herzegovina: 2003–04

Dyskobolia Grodzisk Wielkopolski

- Polish Cup: 2006–07
- Ekstraklasa Cup: 2006–07
