= Neshet Zhaveli =

Kosovan former footballer

Personal information
- Date of birth: 20 April 1955 (age 71)
- Place of birth: Gjakova, DF Yugoslavia
- Position: Goalkeeper

Youth career
- Gjakova

Senior career*
Years	Team	Apps	(Gls)
- Gjakova
- Vëllaznimi
1975–1979	Liria	61	(0)
1979–1984	Rijeka	74	(0)
1984–1986	Prishtina	36	(0)
1987–1989	Sakaryaspor	55	(0)
1989–1992	Fenerbahçe	6	(0)
1992–1995	Sakaryaspor	18	(0)

Managerial career
- 1999: Karabükspor
- * Club domestic league appearances and goals

Neshet Zhaveli (Turkish: Neşhet Muharrem; born 20 April 1955) is a Kosovan former footballer and manager.

== Career ==
He started his football career with the local team Gjakova. He later played for the Kosovan teams Vëllaznimi and Liria. He was part of HNK Rijeka from 1979 until 1984 and then transferred to Prishtina. After successful appearances in the Yugoslav First League, Zhaveli signed for Turkish clubs Sakaryaspor and Fenerbahçe with whom he won several trophies. In Turkey, he played under the name Neşhet Muharrem.

== Honours ==
Sakaryaspor

- Turkish Cup: 1987–88
- Second League of Turkey: 1986–1987

Fenerbahçe

- Turkish Super Cup: 1990
