= Naum Batkoski =

Macedonian footballer

Personal information
- Full name: Naum Batkoski
- Date of birth: 17 May 1978 (age 48)
- Place of birth: Zemun, SR Serbia, SFR Yugoslavia
- Height: 1.81 m (5 ft 11 1/2 in)
- Position: Midfielder

Team information
- Current team: NK Pag

Youth career
- Rijeka

Senior career*
Years	Team	Apps	(Gls)
1998–1999	Poreč	23	(3)
1999–2002	Pomorac Kostrena	73	(14)
2002–2005	Rijeka	34	(1)
2005–2006	Pomorac Kostrena	31	(2)
2006	Rabotnički Kometal		
2007–2009	Zadar	70	(4)
2009–2011	Pomorac Kostrena	28	(3)
2012	Crikvenica	7	(0)
2012–2013	Novalja	23	(1)
2013–2014	Vinodol		
2014–	Pag		

International career^{‡}
2003	Macedonia	2	(0)
- * Club domestic league appearances and goals as of 17 July 2009 ‡ National team caps and goals as of 12 September 2007

Naum Batkoski (born 17 May 1978) is a Macedonian footballer who plays as a midfielder for NK Pag.

== Club career ==
Born in Zemun, SR Serbia, at the time still within Yugoslavia, Batkoski spent almost his entire career in Croatia, except the first half of the 2006–07 season which he played with FK Rabotnički in the Macedonian First League. At time of his birth, in 1978, two players named Batkoski were playing at FK Zemun, Milivoje (his father) and Naum.

== International career ==
He made his senior debut for North Macedonia in a February 2003 friendly match against Croatia and has earned a total of 2 caps, scoring no goals. His second and final international was another February 2003 friendly match against Poland.
