= Sandro Klić =

Croatian footballer

Personal information
- Full name: Sandro Klić
- Date of birth: 5 October 1981 (age 45)
- Place of birth: Rijeka, SR Croatia, SFR Yugoslavia
- Position: Forward

Senior career*
Years	Team	Apps	(Gls)
1999–2004	Rijeka	81	(23)
2004–2005	Zagreb	14	(4)
2005–2006	Pomorac		
2006–2007	Grobničan		
2009	Borac Bakar		

International career^{‡}
1997	Croatia U15	1	(0)
1999	Croatia U17	3	(1)
1999–2000	Croatia U18	3	(0)
1999–2000	Croatia U19	5	(0)
2000–2001	Croatia U20	8	(2)
2002–2003	Croatia U21	5	(0)
- * Club domestic league appearances and goals as of 20 December 2009 ‡ National team caps and goals as of 10 October 2003

Sandro Klić (born 5 October 1981) is a Croatian retired football player.

== Club career ==
Born in Rijeka, as a player he started with HNK Rijeka where he was top scorer during the 2002–03 and 2003–04 seasons. He continued his career with NK Zagreb and NK Pomorac.

== International career ==
He was capped for Croatian youth national team at various age categories.

=== Club statistics ===
Club	Season	League		League	Cup		Continental		Total	
Club	Season	Apps	Goals	League	Apps	Goals	Apps	Goals	Apps	Goals
HNK Rijeka	1999–00	1. HNL	4	0	0	0	–		4	0
HNK Rijeka	2000–01	1. HNL	13	0	0	0	2	0	15	0
HNK Rijeka	2001–02	1. HNL	9	0	0	0	–		9	0
HNK Rijeka	2002–03	1. HNL	29	12	1	0	2	2	32	14
HNK Rijeka	2003–04	1. HNL	25	11	2	2	–		27	13
NK Zagreb	2004–05	1. HNL	14	4	4	1	–		18	5
Rijeka total			80	23	3	2	4	2	87	27
Total			94	27	7	3	4	2	105	32
Last Update: 3 November 2018
