= Ivan Sertić =

Croatian footballer

Personal information
- Full name: Ivan Sertić
- Date of birth: 27 February 1985 (age 41)
- Place of birth: Rijeka, SFR Yugoslavia
- Height: 1.88 m (6 ft 2 in)
- Position: Forward

Senior career*
Years	Team	Apps	(Gls)
2003–2008	Rijeka	6	(0)
2005	→ Novalja (loan)	3	(0)
2005–2006	→ Orijent 1919 (loan)		
2007–2008	→ Pomorac (loan)	25	(3)
2008–2009	Belasitsa Petrich	13	(2)
2009–2010	Orijent 1919	11	(5)
2010	Nehaj	16	(8)
2011–2012	Jadran Poreč	47	(22)
2012–2014	Grobničan	42	(23)
2014–2015	OŠK Omišalj		
2015–2017	Orijent 1919	53	(21)

International career
2001	Croatia U15	5	(2)
2001	Croatia U17	6	(3)
2003	Croatia U18	3	(2)
2003–2004	Croatia U19	12	(4)
2004	Croatia U20	6	(1)
2004–2005	Croatia U21	3	(0)
- * Club domestic league appearances and goals

Ivan Sertić (born 27 February 1985) is a Croatian retired football forward.

== Career ==
Sertić start to play football in NK Rijeka. Between 2001 and 2003 Sertić is a part of Croatia national under-17 football team.

In 2005, he is loaned in NK Novalja for six months.

In season 2007/08 the forward played for NK Pomorac. In summer 2008 he signed a contract with Bulgarian Belasitsa Petrich. Sertić made his official debut for the Bulgarian club on 10 August 2008 in a match against CSKA Sofia as a 74th min substitute. On 8 November 2008 he scored his first goal for Belasitsa in a match against Litex Lovech.

In July 2015, Sertić returned to his former club HNK Orijent 1919. Two years later, in June 2017, he announced his retirement from football.
