= Goran Vincetić =

Croatian footballer (born 1975)

Personal information
- Full name: Goran Vincetić
- Date of birth: 25 September 1975 (age 51)
- Place of birth: Čakovec, SFR Yugoslavia
- Height: 1.83 m (6 ft 0 in)
- Position: Defender

Senior career*
Years	Team	Apps	(Gls)
1994–1996	Istra Pula	26	(0)
1996–1998	Varteks	8	(0)
1997–1998	→ Sloboda Varaždin (loan)		
1998–1999	Čakovec		
1999–2001	Primorje	60	(4)
2001–2003	Rijeka	52	(1)
2003–2005	Primorje	33	(1)
2005	Međimurje	15	(0)
2005–2008	Dinamo Tirana	90	(7)
2008–2010	Weiz	46	(2)
2010–2011	ASKÖ Stinatz	37	(6)
2012–2014	ASK Oberdorf	72	(5)

Managerial career
- 2014-2015: NK Rudar Mursko Središće
- 2015: NK Zagreb
- 2017: Rijeka (youth)
- 2020: Međimurje
- 2021: Maksimir
- 2022: Međimurje
- * Club domestic league appearances and goals as of 13 January 2023

Goran Vincetić (born 25 September 1975) is a retired Croatian football player and former manager of NK Zagreb.

== Playing career ==
Vincetić played for NK Čakovec, NK Rijeka and NK Međimurje in Croatia, NK Primorje in Slovenia, and Dinamo Tirana in Albania. He spent his later years in the Austrian lower leagues.

== Managerial career ==
His first senior managerial job was at Rudar Mursko Središće, whom he joined in June 2014. Vincetić replaced Željko Kopić on the bench at NK Zagreb in June 2015. He was named manager of Maksimir in January 2021, but left the club in October that year for unclear reasons. He was dismissed as coach and sports director at hometown club Međimurje in June 2022.
