= NK Crikvenica =

Croatian football club

Crikvenica
- Full name: Nogometni klub Crikvenica
- Founded: 1919; 107 years ago
- Ground: Gradski stadion
- League: Third League – West
- Website: www.nk-crikvenica.hr

Nogometni klub Crikvenica or simply NK Crikvenica is a Croatian football club based in the northern Adriatic town of Crikvenica. They play in the Third League – West, the fourth tier of Croatian football.

== Ground ==
The team play at the Gradski stadion which is located near the centre of Crikvenica. The stadium once had a motorcycle speedway track around the pitch and hosted significant competitions such as the 1970 Speedway World Team Cup qualifying round and the Yugoslav national championship.
