= Edo Flego =

Croatian footballer

Personal information
- Date of birth: 27 July 1975 (age 51)
- Place of birth: Rijeka, SR Croatia, SFR Yugoslavia
- Height: 1.87 m (6 ft 1 1/2 in)
- Position: Forward

Youth career
- 1985–1997: Rijeka

Senior career*
Years	Team	Apps	(Gls)
1997–2000	Orijent		
2000–2001	Rijeka	16	(5)
2002–2003	Pomorac Kostrena	15	(2)
2003–2004	St. Andrä		
2004–2005	Al-Ittihad Kalba		
2005–2006	Hrvatski Dragovoljac		(9)
2006	Croatia Sesvete	7	(1)
2007	Primorje	13	(4)
2007–2009	Jadran Poreč		(10)
2009–2011	Grobničan	67	(44)
2012	Krk	4	(0)

Managerial career
- 2015-2016: Orijent
- 2021-2022: Orijent
- * Club domestic league appearances and goals as of 8 November 2015

Edo Flego (born 27 July 1975) is a retired Croatian football player.

== Playing career ==
=== Club ===
During his career, he spent two seasons playing in the Croatian First Football League with HNK Rijeka. He also spent one season in the Slovenian PrvaLiga with NK Primorje and five seasons in the Croatian Second Football League.

== Managerial career ==
Following his retirement in 2012 he has been working as a manager. He was appointed Director of HNK Rijeka Academy in June 2016.

He was later rehired by Orijent but dismissed by the club in May 2022.
