= NK Čakovec =

NK Archea-Čakovec
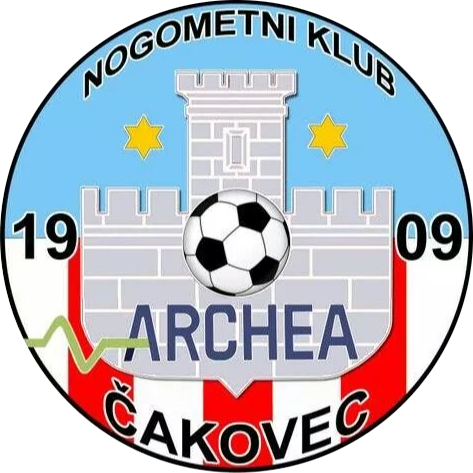
- Full name: Nogometni Klub Archea-Čakovec
- Nickname: "Crveni" (The Reds)
- Founded: 1920; 106 years ago
- Dissolved: 2014; 12 years ago
- Ground: Stadion SRC Mladost, Čakovec, Croatia
- Capacity: 8,000
| Home colours | Away colours |

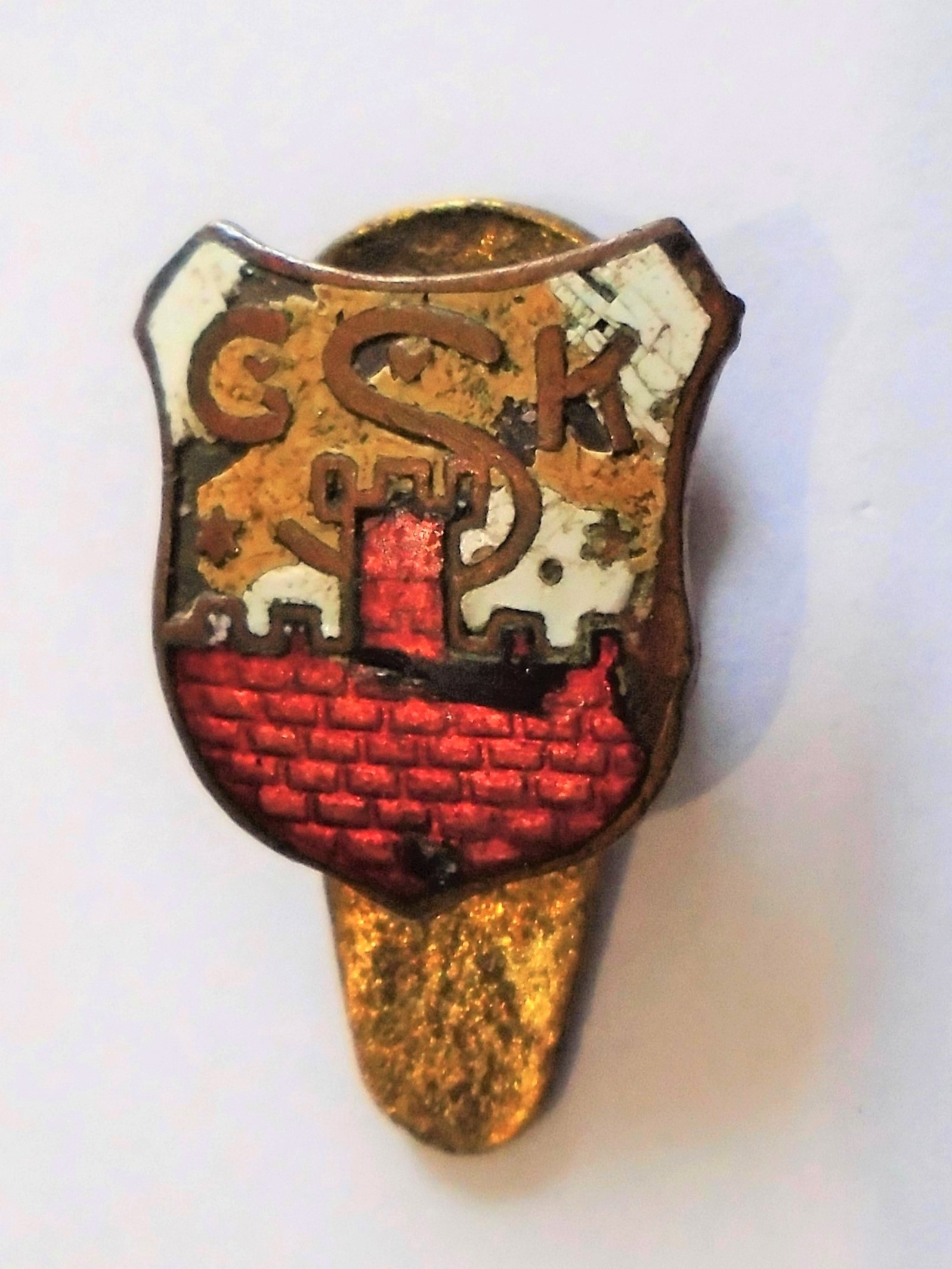
An old enamel pin of ČŠK from 1920s

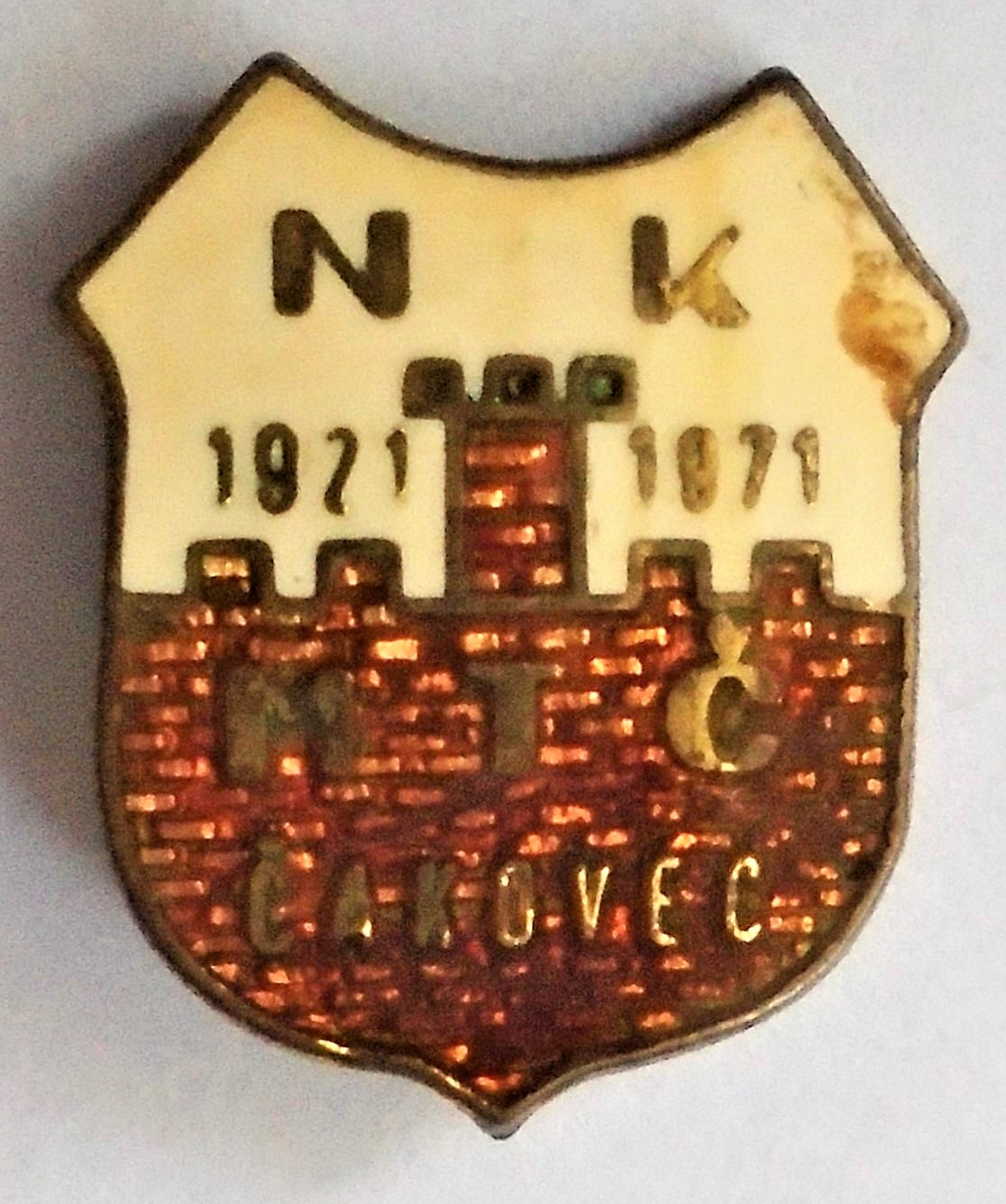
An enamel pin of MTČ Čakovec football club from 1971

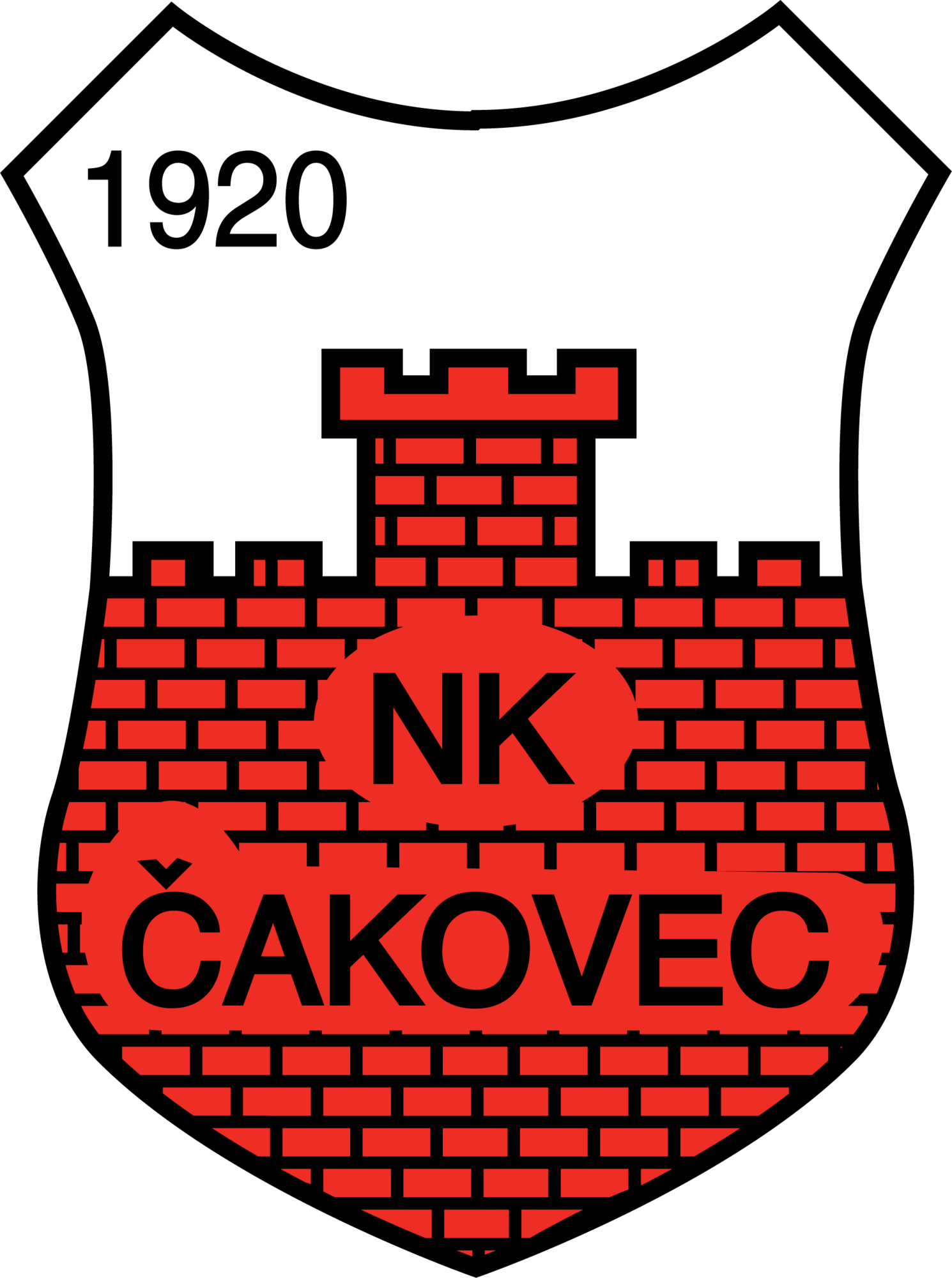
Former logo used by NK Čakovec in HNL.

Nogometni Klub Archea-Čakovec (English: Archea-Čakovec Football Club), commonly referred to as NK Archea-Čakovec, formerly as NK Čakovec, or simply Čakovec, was a Croatian football club based in Čakovec, in the northern part of the country. The club folded in 2014.

The club's arguably biggest success came when they won promotion to the Croatian First League in 2000. However, they only spent two seasons in the top flight before being relegated back to the Croatian Second League in 2002. In 2007, they finished bottom of the Croatian Second League and were relegated to the Croatian Third League, going on to end up playing in the fourth tier of Croatian football following another relegation in 2008.

The club was played their home matches at the Stadion SRC Mladost, Čakovec, which has been their home ground since 1987 and can hold approximately 8,000 people. The stadium has also been used by NK Međimurje following their formation in 2003. The team's supporters group was called the Demons (Croatian: Demoni).

== History ==
=== Early history ===
The club was founded in 1920 as Čakovečki športski klub (ČŠK; English: Čakovec Sports Club) and competed in regional championships in the Kingdom of Yugoslavia. Their first and so far only title came in 1938, when they won the Drava Banovina Championship.

During World War II, Čakovec was occupied by Hungary so the club played in Hungarian competitions until the city was liberated in 1945. After the war, the name of the club was changed to NK Jedinstvo Čakovec (English: Unity Čakovec Football Club) and this name was used over the following two decades. In the mid-1960s, the club was bought by MTČ, a local clothing company, and renamed MTČ Čakovec. In 1983, the club merged with NK Sloga Čakovec (English: Concord Čakovec Football Club), at the time the only other football club within the city, and was renamed MTČ-Sloga Čakovec. The cooperation between the two clubs ended in 1987, with the club being renamed NK Čakovec. NK Sloga Čakovec also continued to exist as a separate club.

During the Yugoslav era, the club's greatest success came when they reached the Round of 16 in the Yugoslav Cup in 1949 and 1952. In 1949, they were knocked out by Budućnost Titograd, suffering a 2–1 home defeat, and three years later they were crushed 7–0 by FK Sarajevo.

=== History after Croatian independence ===
NK Čakovec were first promoted to the Croatian Second League in 1992, but were relegated back to the Croatian Third League after finishing in 15th place. However, the club quickly returned to the Second League in 1994.

Between 1994 and 1996, the club was known as NK Čakovec Union, with "Union" being the name of a local catering company serving as their main sponsor at the time. They also spent one season playing in the short-lived Croatian First B-League, continuing to play in the Second League after the First B-League folded in 1997. The club was again renamed NK Čakovec in December 1996, when it was bought by a group of local businessmen in order to save it from folding due to financial difficulties.

In 1998, the club finished top of the Northern Division of the Croatian Second League, securing a place in the promotion play-offs for the Croatian First League. In the play-offs, played at a neutral venue in Velika Gorica, they failed to clinch promotion following a goalless draw against Jadran Poreč and a 2–1 defeat against Segesta.

The 1998–99 season saw the club missing promotion to the top flight after finishing fourth in the unified Croatian Second League. However, they finally clinched promotion to the Croatian First League the following season after finishing runners-up of the Second League. After the promotion, the club signed former Dinamo Zagreb manager Ilija Lončarević, who went on to manage the team in the first half of the 2000–01 season. The club also signed several players with top-flight experience in order to enforce the squad.

Their first game in the Croatian First League ended in a 2–0 defeat away at Hrvatski dragovoljac. However, they clinched their first top-flight point in their first home fixture of the season, being held to a 2–2 draw in a derby game against NK Varteks. Their first top-flight win came in their fourth game of the season, when they grabbed a surprising 2–0 win at home to Hajduk Split, who went on to clinch the league title at the end of the season. The team continued to deliver some good results during the autumn of 2000, including a goalless draw at home to Dinamo Zagreb, and even fought for a spot in the top-6 group, the Championship League, but eventually fell short by 5 points and finished the first part of the season in 7th place. This meant they continued to play in the bottom-6 group, the Relegation League, after the league was split in two groups in March 2001. Finishing 2nd in the Relegation League, they clinched 8th place in the overall standings. Their league record for the season included 10 wins, 9 draws and 13 defeats.

The team went on to start the 2001–02 season strongly, recording two wins in the opening two matches and topping the table on Day 2. However, they ran out of luck thereafter and found themselves winning only 7 of their remaining 28 league matches, with 5 draws and 16 defeats. They finished 14th among 16 teams in the league that season and were effectively relegated back to the Croatian Second League. Many key players left the club immediately after the relegation in 2002, while some of them later moved to NK Međimurje, a new club formed in the summer of 2003 and playing in the same stadium. NK Međimurje went to play in the top flight between 2004 and 2008, and were again promoted there in 2009 after spending one season in the Croatian Second League.

NK Čakovec experienced mixed fortunes in the Croatian Second League in the years following their relegation from the top flight, managing two 3rd-place finishes in the Northern Division of the league in 2003 and 2005. Following an 8th-place finish in the Northern Division of the Second League in 2006, they went on to play in the unified Second League in the 2006–07 season. However, they finished bottom of the 16-team league and were relegated to the Croatian Third League. Playing in the Eastern Division of the Third League, they ended up being relegated to the fourth tier of Croatian football in 2008.

Since March 2014 it was called Archea-Čakovec, but the senior side has been dissolved since 2014./15.

== Notable managers ==
- (Croatia) Ilija Lončarević
- (Croatia) Drago Vabec
