= Ivan Maroslavac =

Croatian footballer

Personal information
- Full name: Ivan Maroslavac
- Date of birth: 24 June 1976 (age 50)
- Place of birth: Vinkovci, SR Croatia, SFR Yugoslavia
- Height: 1.76 m (5 ft 9 in)
- Position: Midfielder

Senior career*
Years	Team	Apps	(Gls)
1994–1995	Mladost Cerić loan		
1996–2000	Cibalia	44	(1)
2000–2002	Rijeka	27	(4)
2002–2003	Cibalia	52	(1)
2003–2005	Bnei Yehuda	82	(1)
2005–2008	Cibalia	8	(1)
2008–2010	Vinogradar		
2010–2012	Nur Zagreb		
- * Club domestic league appearances and goals as of 30 December 2008

Ivan Maroslavac (born 24 June 1976) is a Croatian retired footballer who played for NK Vinogradar in the Croatian Second League.

== Club career ==
Maroslavac previously played for HNK Cibalia and NK Rijeka in the Croatian First League. He also had a spell in the Israeli Premier League with Bnei Yehuda during the 2003–04 and 2004–05 seasons.
