= Rajko Vidović =

Bosnian footballer

Personal information
- Date of birth: 4 March 1975 (age 51)
- Place of birth: Zavidovići, SFR Yugoslavia
- Height: 1.84 m (6 ft 0 in)
- Position: Forward

Team information
- Current team: Kustošija (manager)

Senior career*
Years	Team	Apps	(Gls)
1997–1999	Rot Weiss Ahlen	8	(2)
2001–2002	Rijeka	21	(4)
2002–2003	Kamen Ingrad	17	(2)
2003–2004	Rijeka	23	(6)
2004–2006	Zagreb	40	(9)
2007	Beijing Hongdeng	17	(4)
2008	Inter Zaprešiić	11	(1)
2008–2009	Lokomotiva	26	(7)
2009–2010	Čelik Zenica	14	(5)
2010–2012	Sông Lam	30	(15)
2012–2014	Dugo Selo	39	(13)

Managerial career
- 2015: Dugo Selo
- 2016: Maksimir
- 2017-2018: Trnje
- 2020-2022: Trnje
- 2022: Lučko
- 2022-2023: Sesvete
- 2024: Gorica
- 2024–: Šibenik
- * Club domestic league appearances and goals as of 13:51, 7 March 2014 (UTC)

Rajko Vidović (born 4 March 1975) is a Croatian-Bosnian football coach and former player who played as a forward. He is currently the coach of Croatian Football League club NK Kustošija.

== Club career ==
During his professional career he mainly played for clubs in Croatia's Prva HNL. He also spent one season in China and two seasons in Vietnam.

== Managerial career ==
Vidović took charge of Maksimir in January 2016 after leaving his post at Dugo Selo, where he had replaced Milivoj Bračuna in August 2015. In November 2017 he was appointed at Trnje.

In January 2022 he was named manager of Lučko, replacing Perica Vidak. Vidović was sacked by Sesvete in April 2023.
