= Damir Matulović =

Croatian footballer (born 1976)

Personal information
- Date of birth: 16 January 1976 (age 50)
- Place of birth: Split, SFR Yugoslavia
- Position: Midfielder

Team information
- Current team: ŽNK Hajduk (manager)

Senior career*
Years	Team	Apps	(Gls)
1993–1995	Hajduk Split	0	(0)
1999–2002	Rijeka	74	(3)
2002–2004	Istra Pula		
2004	Žepče	12	(0)
2005	Čelik Zenica	11	(0)
2005–2006	Šibenik		
2006–2010	Hrvatski Dragovoljac	67	(9)

Managerial career
- 2024–: ŽNK Hajduk
- * Club domestic league appearances and goals

Damir Matulović (born 16 January 1976) is a retired Croatian football midfielder who is now a manager of the ŽNK Hajduk.
