= Natko Rački =

Croatian footballer

Personal information
- Full name: Natko Rački
- Date of birth: 15 November 1981 (age 44)
- Place of birth: Rijeka, SR Croatia, SFR Yugoslavia
- Height: 1.77 m (5 ft 10 in)
- Position: Forward

Senior career*
Years	Team	Apps	(Gls)
2000–2003	Rijeka	55	(22)
2003–2005	Hajduk Split	28	(8)
2006–2007	Međimurje	5	(1)
2007	Pomorac	14	(5)
2008	Istra 1961	21	(5)

International career
2001	Croatia U-20	1	(0)
2002–2003	Croatia U-21	6	(0)
- * Club domestic league appearances and goals

Natko Rački (born 15 November 1981) is a former Croatian football player currently without club. He has had seven caps for Croatia's U21 national team.

== Career ==
Born in Rijeka, as a player he started with HNK Rijeka where he was top scorer during the 2001–02 season. He continued his career with Hajduk Split, winning their last league title with them in 2005, but only managed to score eight goals for the club during two seasons. His goalscoring did not improve as he moved to other clubs in Croatia.

=== Club statistics ===
Club performance			League		Cup		League Cup		Continental		Total	
Season	Club	League	Apps	Goals	Apps	Goals	Apps	Goals	Apps	Goals	Apps	Goals
Croatia			League		Croatian Cup		Super Cup		Europe		Total	
2000-01	HNK Rijeka	Prva HNL	5	1	0	0	–	–	-	-	5	1
2001-02	HNK Rijeka	Prva HNL	24	13	3	1	–	–	-	-	27	14
2002-03	HNK Rijeka	Prva HNL	25	8	1	0	–	–	1	0	27	8
2003-04	Hajduk Split	Prva HNL	17	6	4	3	–	–	1	0	22	9
2004-05	Hajduk Split	Prva HNL	11	2	2	0	–	–	2	0	15	2
2005-06	NK Međimurje	Prva HNL	5	1	0	0	–	–	-	-	5	1
2007-08	Pomorac Kostrena	Druga HNL	14	5	2	3	–	–	-	-	16	8
2008-09	Istra 1961	Druga HNL	21	5	-	-	–	–	-	-	21	5
Total			122	41	12	7	0	0	3	0	137	48

== Honours ==
Hajduk Split

- Croatian First Football League: 2003-04, 2004-05

Istra 1961

- Croatian Second Football League: 2008-09
