= Božidar Čačić =

Croatian footballer

Personal information
- Date of birth: 28 June 1972 (age 54)
- Place of birth: Zadar, SFR Yugoslavia
- Height: 1.83 m (6 ft 0 in)
- Position: Defender

Senior career*
Years	Team	Apps	(Gls)
1992–1995	Izola	40	
1995–1997	Hrvatski Dragovoljac	20	(0)
1998–2002	Rijeka	60	(6)
2002–2003	Sydney United	18	(6)
2003–2004	Ljubljana	12	(3)
- * Club domestic league appearances and goals

Božidar Čačić (born 28 June 1972) is a Croatian retired football defender.

== Club career ==
He spent most of his professional career playing in Croatia's Prva HNL and in Slovenia's Prva Liga. He also spent one year in Australia, playing for Sydney United. He retired from professional football in 2004, after playing with Ljubljana.
