= Đoni Tafra =

Croatian footballer

Personal information
- Full name: Đoni Tafra
- Date of birth: 23 February 1968 (age 58)
- Place of birth: Split, SR Croatia, SFR Yugoslavia
- Position: Goalkeeper

Youth career
- NK Hajduk Split

Senior career*
Years	Team	Apps	(Gls)
1979–1986	Hajduk Split	0	(0)
1990–1994	Šibenik	32	(0)
1994–1996	Varteks	2	(0)
1996–2003	Rijeka	176	(0)
2004–2006	Ogulin		
- * Club domestic league appearances and goals

Đoni Tafra (born 23 February 1968) is a Croatian retired football player.

== Career ==
Tafra started his career in Hajduk Split. He did not make any appearances in official matches, he did however play one friendly match.

Tafra made the biggest mark as a goalkeeper with HNK Rijeka, collecting 176 Prva HNL caps over seven seasons. He is regarded as one of Rijeka's top goalkeepers of all time, particularly since the 1990s, and is remembered by his heroics during the finish of the 1998–99 Prva HNL season. During the 1996–97 Prva HNL season he did not concede a goal for 470 minutes.

== Honours ==
NK Ogulin

  - 4. HNL - Karlovac County: 2004-05

== Career statistics ==
Club performance			League		Cup		League Cup		Continental		Total	
Season	Club	League	Apps	Goals	Apps	Goals	Apps	Goals	Apps	Goals	Apps	Goals
Yugoslavia			League		Yugoslav Cup		League Cup		Europe		Total	
1988-89	NK Hajduk Split	Yugoslav First League	–		–		–		–		0	0
1989-90	NK Hajduk Split	Yugoslav First League	–		–		–		–		0	0
1990-91	NK Šibenik	Yugoslav Second League	13	0	–		–		–		13	0
Croatia			League		Croatian Cup		Super Cup		Europe		Total	
1992	HNK Šibenik	Prva HNL	16	0	–		–		–		16	0
1992-93	HNK Šibenik	Prva HNL	–		–		–		–		0	0
1993-94	HNK Šibenik	Prva HNL	3	0	1	0	–		–		4	0
1994-95	NK Varteks	Prva HNL	1	0	–		–		–		1	0
1995-96	NK Varteks	Prva HNL	1	0	–		–		–		1	0
1996-97	HNK Rijeka	Prva HNL	16	0	0	0	–		–		16	0
1997-98	HNK Rijeka	Prva HNL	26	0	1	0	–		–		27	0
1998-99	HNK Rijeka	Prva HNL	32	0	2	0	–		–		34	0
1999-00	HNK Rijeka	Prva HNL	30	0	1	0	–		2	0	33	0
2000-01	HNK Rijeka	Prva HNL	30	0	0	0	–		4	0	34	0
2001-02	HNK Rijeka	Prva HNL	24	0	2	0	–		–		26	0
2002-03	HNK Rijeka	Prva HNL	18	0	1	0	–		1	0	20	0
Rijeka total			176	0	7	0	0	0	7	0	190	0
2004-05	NK Ogulin	4. HNL - Karlovac County	–		–		–		–		–	
2005-06	NK Ogulin	3. HNL - Centre	–		2	0	–		–		2	0
Total
Total	Career total		210	0	10	0	0	0	7	0	227	0
