= Andre Mijatović =

Croatian footballer

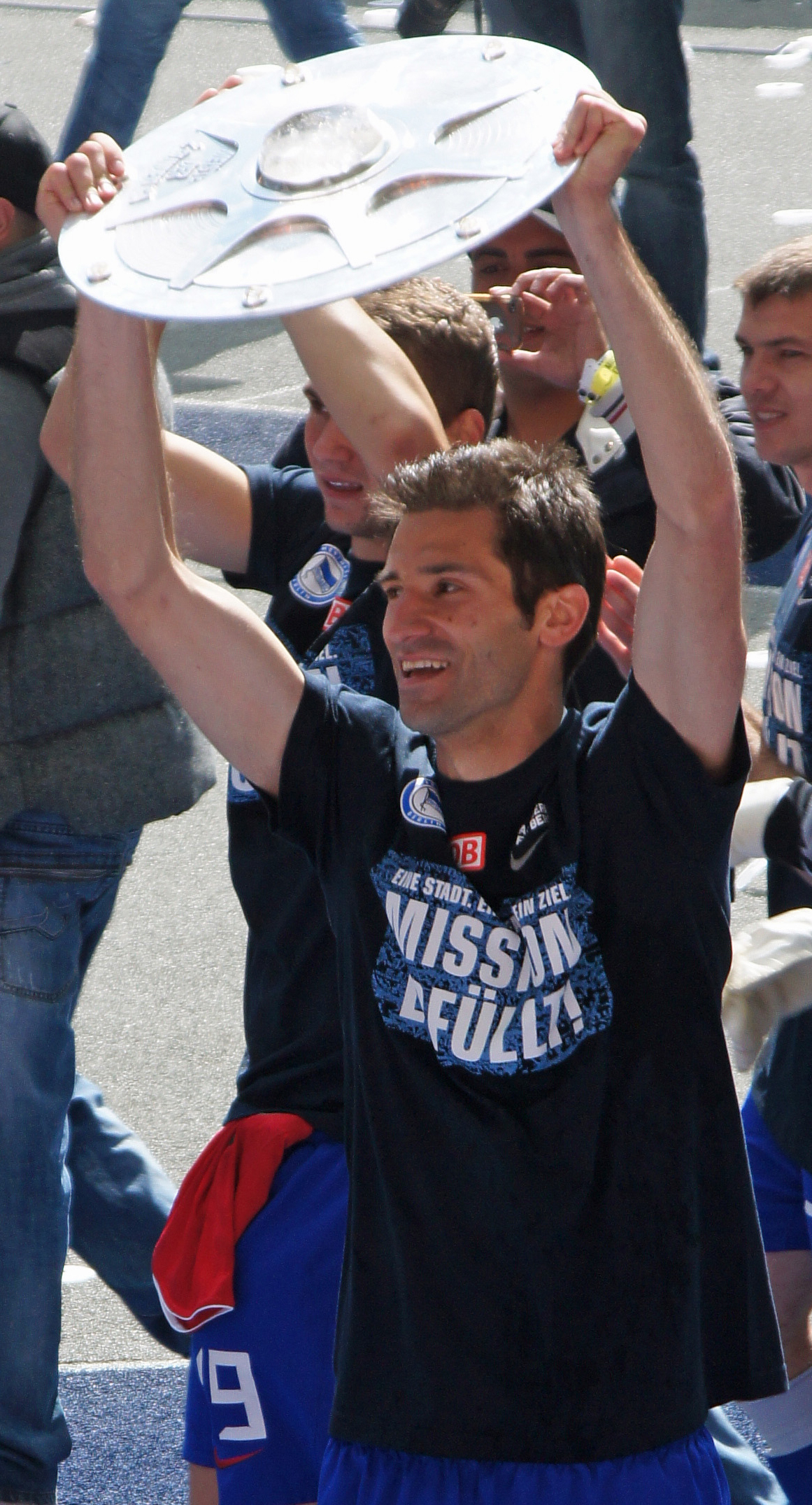
- Mijatović in 2011

Personal information
- Full name: Andre Mijatović
- Date of birth: 3 December 1979 (age 46)
- Place of birth: Rijeka, SFR Yugoslavia
- Height: 1.91 m (6 ft 3 in)
- Position: Centre-back

Senior career*
Years	Team	Apps	(Gls)
1998–2003	Rijeka	123	(12)
2003–2005	Dinamo Zagreb	51	(1)
2005–2007	Greuther Fürth	60	(7)
2007–2010	Arminia Bielefeld	74	(8)
2010–2012	Hertha BSC	47	(2)
2012–2015	FC Ingolstadt	53	(3)
Total		408	(33)

International career
1999–2001	Croatia U21	10	(0)
2001	Croatia B	1	(0)
- * Club domestic league appearances and goals

Andre Mijatović (born 3 December 1979) is a Croatian former professional footballer who played as a centre-back.

== Career ==
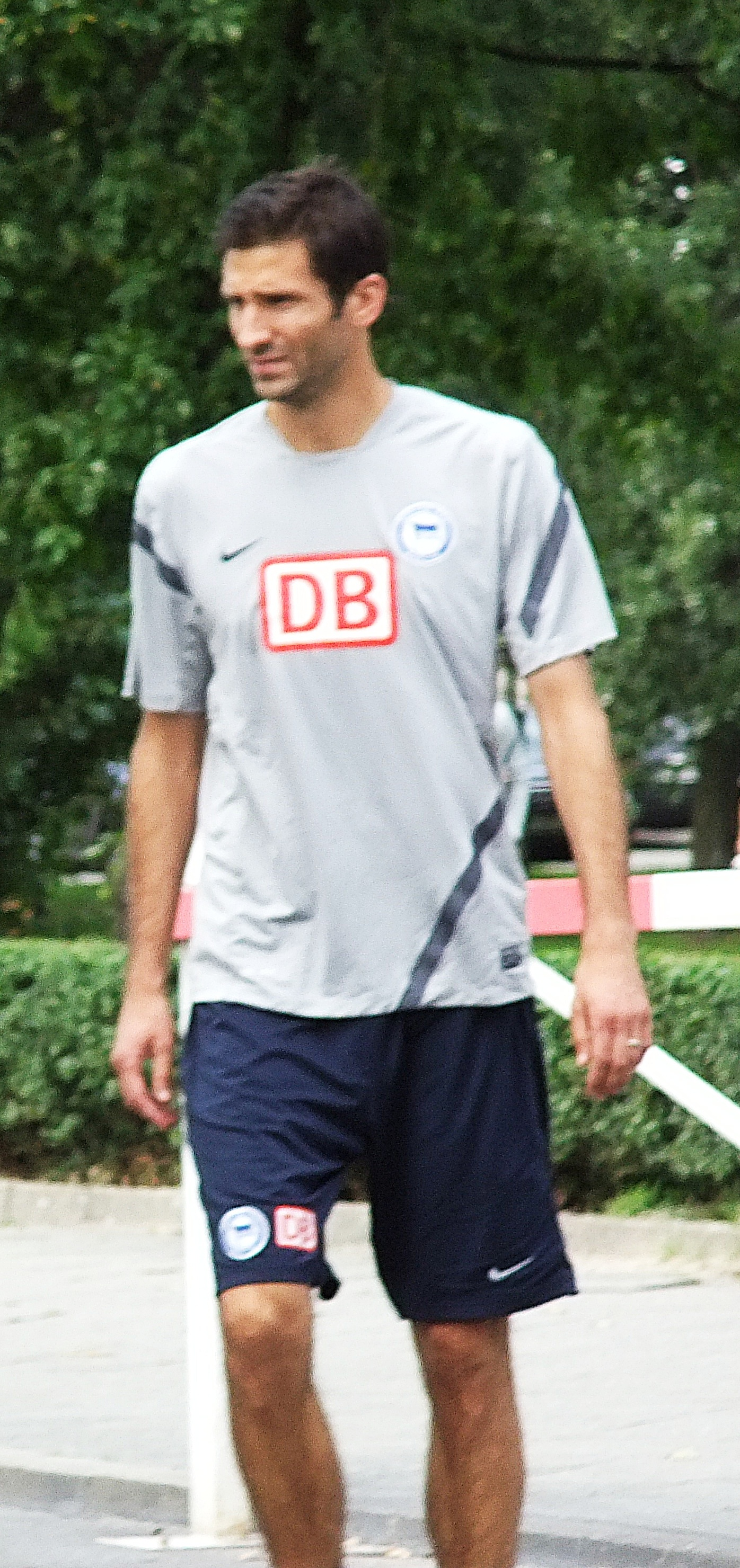
Mijatović with Hertha BSC in 2011

Mijatović was born in Rijeka, SR Croatia, SFR Yugoslavia and started his career at the local club HNK Rijeka, where he became a member of the first team in the summer of 1998. He subsequently spent five seasons with the club and was a regular in every of the five seasons, making a total of 122 appearances and scoring 10 goals for the club in the Croatian First League. He also made a total of 10 appearances and scored three goals for Rijeka in European international club competitions during the club's participations in the UEFA Champions League qualifying in 1999 and the UEFA Cup in the early 2000s.

During his time with Rijeka, Mijatović also earned himself a place in the Croatian national under-21 team, for which he won a total of 10 international caps between April 1999 and June 2001. He made his debut for the team at the 1999 World Youth Championship in Nigeria, where he played all 90 minutes in every of the four matches played by the Croatian team at the tournament before they were eliminated in the round of 16. He also made four appearances for the team in their qualifying campaign for the 2002 European Under-21 Championship.

At club level, Mijatović left Rijeka for Dinamo Zagreb in the summer of 2003 and subsequently played two seasons for the club as a regular in their team, making a total of 51 appearances and scoring one goal in the Croatian First League. He also won the Croatian Cup with Dinamo in 2004 and played in the UEFA Cup in both of the two seasons with the club, making a total of eight appearances and scoring once as he netted the second goal in Dinamo's 6–1 victory over KSK Beveren on 4 November 2004.

In the summer of 2005, Mijatović left Dinamo for German 2. Bundesliga side SpVgg Greuther Fürth and became a regular in the team from the beginning, although his 2. Bundesliga debut against Dynamo Dresden on 6 August 2005 was not entirely successful as he was sent off after receiving two yellow cards. He went on to make 30 out of possible 34 appearances his first season with Greuther Fürth and also scored three goals for the club in the league, first of them being in a 2–2 draw away against Wacker Burghausen on 17 March 2006.

In July 2007, he moved to Bundesliga team Arminia Bielefeld, where he was a regular in the first team. After three seasons in Bielefeld, he left Arminia to join the newly relegated Hertha BSC. He captained the Berlin club to a first-place finish, leading to its immediate return to the top-flight, but was relegated again the following season.

== Personal life ==
Mijatović's son Roko plays with the Bayern Munich under-19 team.

== Career statistics ==
=== Club ===
Appearances and goals by club, season and competition
Club	Season	League			National Cup		League Cup		Continental		Total	
Club	Season	Division	Apps	Goals	Apps	Goals	Apps	Goals	Apps	Goals	Apps	Goals
HNK Rijeka	1998–99	Prva HNL	28	1	2	0	–	–	–	–	30	1
HNK Rijeka	1999–2000	Prva HNL	21	2	3	0	–	–	–	–	24	2
HNK Rijeka	2000–01	Prva HNL	28	1	0	0	–	–	4	2	32	3
HNK Rijeka	2001–02	Prva HNL	26	5	2	0	–	–	–	–	28	5
HNK Rijeka	2002–03	Prva HNL	20	3	0	0	–	–	1	0	21	3
HNK Rijeka	Total		123	12	7	0	0	0	5	2	135	14
Dinamo Zagreb	2003–04	Prva HNL	30	0	6	0	1	0	8	1	45	1
Dinamo Zagreb	2004–05	Prva HNL	21	1	3	1	1	0	6	1	31	3
Dinamo Zagreb	Total		51	1	9	1	2	0	14	2	76	4
Greuther Fürth	2005–06	2. Bundesliga	30	3	1	0	–	–	–	–	31	3
Greuther Fürth	2006–07	2. Bundesliga	30	4	3	0	–	–	–	–	33	4
Greuther Fürth	Total		60	7	4	0	0	0	0	0	64	7
Arminia Bielefeld	2007–08	Bundesliga	24	3	2	0	–	–	–	–	26	3
Arminia Bielefeld	2008–09	Bundesliga	19	1	0	0	–	–	–	–	19	1
Arminia Bielefeld	2009–10	2. Bundesliga	31	4	1	0	–	–	–	–	32	4
Arminia Bielefeld	Total		74	8	3	0	0	0	0	0	77	8
Hertha Berlin	2010–11	2. Bundesliga	24	3	2	0	–	–	–	–	26	3
Hertha Berlin	2011–12	Bundesliga	22	1	3	0	–	–	–	–	25	1
Hertha Berlin	Total		46	4	5	0	0	0	0	0	51	4
FC Ingolstadt	2012–13	2. Bundesliga	30	2	0	0	–	–	–	–	30	2
FC Ingolstadt	2013–14	2. Bundesliga	12	0	1	0	–	–	–	–	13	0
FC Ingolstadt	2014–15	2. Bundesliga	11	1	0	0	–	–	–	–	11	1
FC Ingolstadt	Total		53	3	1	0	0	0	0	0	54	3
Career total			407	35	29	1	2	0	19	4	457	40

== Honours ==
Dinamo Zagreb

- Croatian Cup: 2003–04
- Croatian Super Cup: 2003

Hertha BSC

- 2. Bundesliga: 2010–11

FC Ingolstadt

- 2. Bundesliga: 2014–15
