= Stjepan Skočibušić =

Croatian footballer

Personal information
- Date of birth: 10 June 1979 (age 47)
- Place of birth: Makarska, SR Croatia, SFR Yugoslavia
- Height: 1.87 m (6 ft 2 in)
- Position: Defender

Senior career*
| Years | Team | Apps | (Gls) |
| 1999–2003 | Rijeka | 93 | (7) |
| 2003–2004 | Hajduk Split | 12 | (1) |
| 2004–2006 | Mouscron | 12 | (0) |
| 2006–2008 | Torpedo Moscow | 13 | (0) |
| 2008–2011 | Zadar | 40 | (1) |
- * Club domestic league appearances and goals

Stjepan Skočibušić (born 10 June 1979) is a Croatian retired football defender. He spent eight years of his professional career playing in Croatia’s Prva HNL, collecting 145 appearances. He spent four years of his career in Belgium and Russia, playing for Mouscron and Torpedo Moscow. He retired from professional football in 2011, after playing with Zadar.

== Honours ==
Hajduk Split

- Prva HNL: 2003-04
