= Josip Modrić =

Croatian footballer

Personal information
- Date of birth: 13 August 1979 (age 47)
- Place of birth: Croatia
- Position: Defender

Senior career*
Years	Team	Apps	(Gls)
1999–2004	Rijeka	20+	(0+)
2004–2009	Zadar	31+	(0+)
- * Club domestic league appearances and goals

Josip Modrić (born 13 August 1979) is a retired Croatian football defender.
