= Kristijan Čaval =

Croatian footballer

Personal information
- Full name: Kristijan Čaval
- Date of birth: 11 October 1978 (age 48)
- Place of birth: Rijeka, SFR Yugoslavia
- Height: 1.79 m (5 ft 10 in)
- Position: Midfielder

Youth career
- Grobničan
- 1994–1997: Rijeka

Senior career*
Years	Team	Apps	(Gls)
1998–2005	Rijeka	130	(12)
2005	Kamen Ingrad	8	(0)
2006	Dinamo Tirana	16	(1)
2006–2007	Šibenik	28	(4)
2007–2010	Slaven Belupo	57	(6)
2010–2013	Rijeka	66	(2)
2016–2017	Grobničan	23	(4)

International career
1998	Croatia U-20	2	(0)
- * Club domestic league appearances and goals as of 20 December 2017

Kristijan Čaval (born 11 October 1978) is a retired Croatian football midfielder, who played for NK Rijeka in Croatia's Prva HNL for most of his career.

== Club career ==
Čaval played two matches for the Croatia national under-20 football team in 1998.

He came out of retirement in 2016 to play for fourth-tier club NK Grobničan.

== Career statistics ==
Club performance			League		Cup		League Cup		Continental		Total	
Season	Club	League	Apps	Goals	Apps	Goals	Apps	Goals	Apps	Goals	Apps	Goals
Croatia			League		Croatian Cup		Super Cup		Europe		Total	
1998–99	HNK Rijeka	Prva HNL	6	0	1	0	–		–		7	0
1999–00	HNK Rijeka	Prva HNL	11	2	0	0	–		0	0	11	2
2000–01	HNK Rijeka	Prva HNL	22	4	0	0	–		3	0	25	4
2001–02	HNK Rijeka	Prva HNL	20	1	3	0	–		–		25	4
2002–03	HNK Rijeka	Prva HNL	24	1	1	0	–		2	0	27	1
2003–04	HNK Rijeka	Prva HNL	24	2	4	1	–		–		28	3
2004–05	HNK Rijeka	Prva HNL	23	2	7	1	–		2	0	32	3
2005–06	NK Kamen Ingrad	Prva HNL	8	0	4	1	–		–		7	0
Albania			League		Albanian Cup		Super Cup		Europe		Total	
2005–06	FK Dinamo Tirana	Albanian Superliga	16	1	2	0	–		–		18	0
Croatia			League		Croatian Cup		Super Cup		Europe		Total	
2006–07	HNK Šibenik	Prva HNL	28	4	2	0	–		–		30	4
2007–08	NK Slaven Belupo	Prva HNL	26	5	4	0	–		1	0	32	5
2008–09	NK Slaven Belupo	Prva HNL	17	1	3	1	–		6	1	26	3
2009–10	NK Slaven Belupo	Prva HNL	14	0	0	0	–		–		14	0
2010–11	HNK Rijeka	Prva HNL	24	1	2	0	–		–		26	1
2011–12	HNK Rijeka	Prva HNL	24	1	0	0	–		–		24	1
2012–13	HNK Rijeka	Prva HNL	18	1	0	0	–		–		24	1
Country	Croatia		289	24	31	4	0	0	14	1	334	29
Country	Albania		16	1	2	0	0	0	0	0	18	2
Total			305	25	33	4	0	0	14	1	352	30

== Honours ==
Rijeka

- Croatian Cup: 2005

Grobničan

- 4. HNL – Zapad: 2017–18
