= Željko =

Željko (Cyrillic: Жељко), sometimes written Zeljko, is a South Slavic masculine given name.

In Croatia, the name Željko was among the most common masculine given names in the decades between 1950 and 1979, and was the most common name in the 1960s.

Notable people with the name include:

- Željko Ačkar (born 1969), Croatian footballer
- Željko Adžić (born 1965), Croatian footballer
- Zeljko Babic (born 1976), Australian association football player
- Željko Babić (born 1972), Croatian handball player and coach
- Željko Bajčeta (born 1967), Montenegrin footballer
- Željko Bebek (born 1945), Bosnian singer, lead vocalist of Bijelo dugme from 1974 to 1984
- Željko Bilecki (1950–2023), Canadian soccer player
- Željko Blagojević, Bosnian Serb long-distance runner
- Željko Božić (born 1974), Serbian stuntman and actor
- Željko Bogut (born 1969), Bosnian chess player and two time national champion
- Željko Brkić (born 1986), Serbian football goalkeeper
- Željko Brestovački (born 1967), Serbian politician
- Željko Brodarić (born 1954), Yugoslavian rock musician
- Željko Bujas (1928–1999), Croatian linguist, scholar and lexicographer
- Željko Burić (born 1955), Croatian politician
- Željko Buvač (born 1961), Bosnian Serb footballer and manager
- Željko Čajkovski (1925–2016), Croatian football player and coach
- Željko Cicović (born 1971), Serbian football goalkeeper
- Željko Cupan (born 1963), Croatian footballer
- Željko Đokić (born 1982), Serbian footballer
- Željko Đurđić (born 1961), Serbian handball goalkeeper
- Željko Dimitrijević (born 1971), Serbian Paralympic athlete
- Željko Dimitrov (born 1994), Serbian footballer
- Željko Fajfrić (born 1957), Serbian lawyer, professor and historian
- Željko Filipović (born 1988), Slovenian footballer
- Željko Franulović (born 1947), Croatian tennis player
- Željko Gavrić (born 2000), Serbian footballer
- Željko Gavrilović (born 1971), Serbian footballer
- Željko Glasnović (born 1954), Croatian general and politician
- Željko Ivanek (born 1957), American actor of Slovenian-Croatian origin
- Željko Ivanković (born 1954), Croatian writer from Bosnia and Herzegovina
- Željko Ivanović, Montenegrin journalist, producer and human rights activist
- Željko Ivezić (born 1965), Croatian American astrophysicist
- Željko Janjetović, Bosnian diplomat, Ambassador Extraordinary and Plenipotentiary of Bosnia and Herzegovina to the Russian Federation
- Željko Janović (born 1963), Montenegrin footballer
- Željko Jerkić, Bosnian diplomat
- Željko Jerkov (born 1953), Croatian basketballer
- Željko Jerman (1949–2006), Croatian photographer
- Željko Joksimović (born 1972), popular Serbian singer, composer, songwriter and producer
- Željko Jovanović (disambiguation), multiple people
- Željko Kalac (born 1972), Australian goalkeeper currently playing for Greek club Kavala
- Željko Kalajdžić (born 1978), Serbian professional football midfielder
- Željko Kaluđerović (born 1964), Montenegrin footballer
- Željko Karaula (born 1973), Croatian historian and author
- Željko Kerum (born 1960), Croatian entrepreneur and politician
- Željko Kipke (born 1953), Croatian artist
- Željko Kljajević (born 1984), Montenegrin footballer
- Željko Knapić (born 1957), Croatian sprinter
- Željko Komšić (born 1964), Bosnian-Herzegovinian politician
- Željko Kopanja (1954–2016), Bosnian Serb newspaper editor and director of Nezavisne Novine
- Željko Kopić (born 1977), Croatian football coach
- Željko Kosanović (born 1934), Croatian basketballer and handball player
- Željko Kovačević (born 1981), Serbian footballer
- Željko Krajan (born 1979), Croatian tennis player and coach
- Željko Kuzmić (born 1984), Serbian football goalkeeper
- Željko Lelek (born 1962), Bosnian Serb indicted for mass rape crimes in Višegrad during the Bosnian War
- Željko Loparić (born 1939), Croatian philosopher, historian of the philosophy and university teacher
- Željko Ljubenović (born 1981), Serbian football midfielder and coach
- Željko Lordanić (born 1948), Croatian cartoonist, animator and illustrator
- Željko Lučić (born 1968), Serbian operatic baritone
- Željko Lukajić (born 1958), Serbian basketball coach
- Željko Majić (born 1963), Bosnian bishop
- Željko Malčić (born 1981), Croatian footballer
- Željko Malnar (1944–2013), writer and TV presenter
- Željko Marasović (1951–2021), Croatian American composer of classical and film music
- Željko Markov (born 1976), Serbian footballer and manager
- Željko Matuš (born 1935), Croatian footballer
- Željko Mavrović (born 1969), Croatian boxer and entrepreneur
- Željko Mejakić (born 1964), Bosnian Serb war criminal
- Željko Mijač (1954–2022), Croatian football player and manager
- Željko Milanović (born 1957), Croatian handball player and coach
- Željko Milinovič (born 1969), Slovenian footballer
- Željko Milošević (born 1976), Serbian footballer
- Željko Milović (born 1968), Bosnian writer, poet and journalist
- Željko Mitrakovič (born 1972), Slovenian football midfielder
- Željko Mrvaljević (born 1981), Montenegrin football defender
- Željko Musa (born 1986), Croatian handball player
- Željko Nimš (born 1950), Croatian handball player
- Željko Obradović (born 1960), Serbian basketball player and coach
- Željko Ožegović (born 1962), Serbian politician
- Željko Pahek (born 1954), Croatian and Serbian comics creator and illustrator
- Željko Pakasin (born 1967), Croatian footballer and manager
- Željko Panić (born 1976), Bosnian swimmer
- Željko Pavličević (born 1951), Croatian basketballer and coach
- Željko Pavlović (born 1971), Croatian football goalkeeper
- Željko Perović (born 1975), Montenegrin footballer
- Željko Perušić (1936–2017), Croatian footballer
- Željko Pervan (born 1962), Croatian comedian
- Željko Petrović (born 1965), Montenegro footballer and technical coach
- Željko Petrović (born 1969), Bosnian long-distance runner
- Željko Polak (born 1976), Bosnian Serb football player
- Željko Poljak (born 1959), Croatian basketballer and coach
- Zeljko Radovic (born 1974), Austrian football player
- Zeljko Ranogajec (born 1961), professional gambler from Australia
- Željko Ražnatović (1952–2000), better known as Arkan, Serbian career criminal and later a paramilitary leader
- Željko Rebrača (born 1972), Serbian basketball player
- Željko Reiner (born 1953), Croatian physician, politician and professor
- Željko Rodić (1952–2016), Croatian footballer
- Željko Rohatinski (1951–2019), Croatian economist and former Governor of the Croatian National Bank
- Željko Samardžić (born 1955), Bosnian Serb pop-folk singer
- Željko Šašić (born 1969), Serbian pop-folk singer
- Željko Savić (born 1988), Bosnian Serb footballer
- Željko Senečić (1933–2018), Croatian film and television production designer, film director and screenwriter
- Željko Simović (born 1967), Serbian footballer and manager
- Željko Sošić (born 1980), Montenegrin director
- Željko Sopić (born 1974), Croatian football midfielder
- Željko Stinčić (born 1950), Croatian footballer
- Željko Šturanović (born 1960), Montenegro politician
- Zeljko Susa (born 1978), Australian footballer
- Željko Sušec (born 1977), Serbian politician
- Željko Tadić (born 1974), Montenegrin footballer
- Željko Tanasković (born 1967), Serbian volleyball player
- Željko Tomac (born 1956), Croatian handball player
- Željko Tomić (born 1985), Croatian footballer
- Željko Topalović (born 1972), Serbian hotelier and basketballer
- Željko Topić (born 1959), Croatian bureaucrat
- Željko Trajković (born 1966), Serbian wrestler
- Željko Turk (born 1962), Croatian politician
- Željko Vadić (born 1953), Croatian sport shooter
- Željko Vasiljević (born 1963), Serbian politician and veteran representative
- Željko Veselinović (born 1974), Serbian union leader and politician
- Željko Vidović (born 1964), Serbian politician
- Željko Vincek (born 1986), Croatian sprinter who specializes in the 400 metres
- Željko Vuković (footballer, born 1962), Croatian-born Austrian footballer
- Željko Vuković (footballer, born 1963), Montenegrin footballer
- Željko Zagorac (born 1981), professional basketball player
- Željko Zečević (born 1963), Serbian basketball coach
- Željko Župetić (born 1967), Croatian footballer

== See also ==
- Željka
- Želimir
