= 2000–01 Croatian First Football League =

Croatian First Football League
- Season: 2000–01
- Champions: Hajduk Split; 4th Croatian title 13th domestic title
- Runner up: Dinamo Zagreb
- Relegated: None
- Champions League: Hajduk Split
- UEFA Cup: Dinamo Zagreb; Osijek; Varteks
- Intertoto Cup: Slaven Belupo; NK Zagreb
- Matches: 192
- Goals: 548 (2.85 per match)
- Best player: Boško Balaban
- Top goalscorer: Tomislav Šokota (20)
- Biggest home win: Slaven Belupo 7–1 Varteks; Hajduk Split 6–0 Varteks
- Biggest away win: Marsonia 0–5 Hajduk Split; Hrvatski Dragovoljac 0–5 Croatia Zagreb
- Highest scoring: Slaven Belupo 7–1 Varteks; Croatia Zagreb 6–2 Slaven Belupo; Osijek 6–2 Hrvatski Dragovoljac; Šibenik 3–5 Hrvatski Dragovoljac
- Average attendance: 2,882

The 2000–01 Croatian First Football League was the tenth season of the Croatian First Football League, also known as 1. HNL, Croatia's top association football league, since its establishment in 1992. It began on 30 July 2000 and ended on 27 May 2001. Dinamo Zagreb were the defending champions, having won their fifth consecutive title the previous season. The 2000–01 Prva HNL was contested by 12 teams and was won by Hajduk Split, who won their thirteenth title, after a win against Varteks on 27 May 2001, which was ended the Dinamo Zagreb (then Croatia Zagreb)'s five-year dominance.

== Teams ==
A total of twelve teams contested the league, including ten sides from the 1999–2000 season and two promoted teams from the 1999–2000 Croatian Second Football League, Čakovec and Marsonia. Marsonia had returned to top flight after one previous three-season spell in the Prva HNL between 1994 and 1997, while Čakovec saw its top flight debut after coming close to promotion in 1998 and 1999 (they lost the promotion play-offs on both occasions).

=== Changes from last season ===
Teams promoted from 1999–2000 Croatian Second Football League

- Champions: Marsonia
- Runners-up: Čakovec

Teams relegated to 2000–01 Croatian Second Football League

- 11th placed: Istra Pula
- 12th placed: Vukovar '91

=== Summaries ===
Locations of teams in the 2000–01 Prva HNL

The following is an overview of teams which competed in the 2000–01 Prva HNL. The list of managers is correct as of 30 July 2000, the first day of the season.

Team	Manager	Home city	Stadium	Capacity
Cibalia	(Croatia) Davor Mladina	Vinkovci	Stadion HNK Cibalia	9,920
Čakovec	(Croatia) Ilija Lončarević	Čakovec	Stadion SRC Mladost	8,000
Dinamo Zagreb	(Croatia) Ilija Lončarević	Zagreb	Stadion Maksimir	37,168
Hajduk Split	(Croatia) Zoran Vulić	Split	Stadion Poljud	35,000
Hrvatski Dragovoljac	(Croatia) Milivoj Bračun	Zagreb	Stadion NŠC Stjepan Spajić	5,000
Marsonia	(Croatia) Stjepan Deverić	Slavonski Brod	Gradski stadion uz Savu	10,000
Osijek	(Croatia) Stanko Mršić	Osijek	Stadion Gradski vrt	19,500
Rijeka	(Croatia) Nenad Gračan	Rijeka	Stadion Kantrida	10,275
Slaven Belupo	(Croatia) Mladen Frančić	Koprivnica	Gradski stadion	4,000
Šibenik	(Croatia) Milo Nižetić	Šibenik	Stadion Šubićevac	8,000
Varteks	(Croatia) Ivan Katalinić	Varaždin	Stadion Varteks	10,800
NK Zagreb	(Croatia) Branko Karačić	Zagreb	Stadion Kranjčevićeva	8,850

=== Managerial changes ===
Team	Outgoing manager	Manner of departure	Date of vacancy	Replaced by	Date of appointment	Position in table
Čakovec				(Croatia) Ilija Lončarević		Pre-season
Varteks				(Croatia) Ivan Katalinić	24 May 2000	Pre-season
Marsonia	(Croatia) Stjepan Deverić	Resigned	21 August 2000	(Croatia) Marijan Zovko	21 August 2000	12th
Hajduk Split	(Croatia) Petar Nadoveza	Sacked	21 August 2000	(Croatia) Zoran Vulić	21 August 2000	2nd
Hrvatski Dragovoljac	(Croatia) Milivoj Bračun	Sacked	22 October 2000	(Croatia) Predrag Jurić (p)	22 October 2000	9th
Cibalia	(Croatia) Davor Mladina	Resigned	15 October 2000	(Croatia) Davor Čop	15 October 2000	11th
Marsonia	(Croatia) Marijan Zovko	Resigned	1 November 2000	(Croatia) Zlatko Kranjčar	3 November 2000	12th
Rijeka	(Croatia) Nenad Gračan	Sacked	13 November 2000	(Croatia) Boris Tičić (c)	13 November	9th
Dinamo Zagreb	(Croatia) Marijan Vlak	Removed from position	20 November 2000	(Croatia) Hrvoje Braović	20 November 2000	2nd
Rijeka	(Croatia) Boris Tičić (c)	Removed from position	15 December 2000	(Croatia) Predrag Stilinović	15 December 2000	9th
Čakovec	(Croatia) Ilija Lončarević	Resigned	3 February 2001	(Croatia) Rajko Magić	4 February 2001	8th
Marsonia	(Croatia) Zlatko Kranjčar			(Croatia) Marijan Zovko		
Šibenik	(Croatia) Milo Nižetić	Resigned	28 February 2001	(Croatia) Vjekoslav Lokica	28 February 2001	8th
Dinamo Zagreb	(Croatia) Hrvoje Braović	Sacked	3 April 2001	(Croatia) Ilija Lončarević	3 April 2001	1st
Osijek	(Croatia) Stanko Mršić	Sacked	3 April 2001	(Croatia) Vlado Bilić	3 April 2001	2nd
NK Zagreb	(Croatia) Branko Karačić	Sacked	16 April 2001	(Croatia) Zlatko Kranjčar	16 April 2001	6th
Varteks	(Croatia) Ivan Katalinić	Sacked	1 May 2001	(Croatia) Branko Janžek	1 May 2001	5th
Rijeka	(Croatia) Predrag Stilinović	Sacked	2 May 2001	(Croatia) Ivan Katalinić	15 December 2000	11th

== First stage ==
Pos	Team	Pld	W	D	L	GF	GA	GD	Pts	Qualification
1	Dinamo Zagreb	22	13	7	2	49	23	+26	46	Qualification to championship group
2	Osijek	22	13	5	4	49	28	+21	44	Qualification to championship group
3	Hajduk Split	22	12	5	5	39	16	+23	41	Qualification to championship group
4	NK Zagreb	22	10	4	8	43	38	+5	34	Qualification to championship group
5	Varteks	22	8	8	6	42	36	+6	32	Qualification to championship group
6	Slaven Belupo	22	8	8	6	28	23	+5	32	Qualification to championship group
7	Čakovec	22	7	6	9	19	28	−9	27	Qualification to relegation group
8	Šibenik	22	7	5	10	21	30	−9	26	Qualification to relegation group
9	Hrvatski Dragovoljac	22	6	5	11	28	45	−17	23	Qualification to relegation group
10	Cibalia	22	3	11	8	23	38	−15	20	Qualification to relegation group
11	Rijeka	22	5	4	13	17	32	−15	19	Qualification to relegation group
12	Marsonia	22	4	4	14	28	49	−21	16	Qualification to relegation group

Source: RSSSF.org
Rules for classification: 1) points; 2) goal difference; 3) number of goals scored.

=== Rounds 1–22 results ===
Home \ Away	CIB	ČAK	DIN	HAJ	HRD	MAR	OSI	RIJ	SLA	ŠIB	VAR	ZAG
Cibalia		3–2	1–1	0–2	0–0	1–1	1–1	1–2	0–0	1–1	1–1	0–2
Čakovec	1–0		0–0	2–0	2–1	1–0	0–1	1–0	0–0	1–0	2–2	1–1
Dinamo Zagreb	6–1	3–0		3–2	2–1	4–1	0–1	4–1	5–1	2–0	0–4	3–2
Hajduk Split	1–1	3–1	0–1		4–0	2–0	1–1	3–0	2–1	0–0	2–0	2–0
Hrvatski Dragovoljac	0–2	2–0	0–5	1–3		4–2	1–0	0–0	1–1	2–1	3–1	1–2
Marsonia	3–3	0–1	2–3	0–5	2–2		2–5	2–0	2–1	0–1	1–1	2–3
Osijek	3–0	4–3	1–1	2–1	6–2	1–2		1–2	3–0	2–0	4–1	4–3
Rijeka	1–2	1–1	0–1	0–0	2–0	2–0	2–3		0–1	0–1	2–2	0–1
Slaven Belupo	0–0	0–0	1–1	2–0	2–1	3–1	0–0	1–0		3–1	7–1	1–0
Šibenik	3–3	3–0	0–0	0–3	3–5	1–0	1–0	1–0	1–0		1–1	1–3
Varteks	3–0	1–0	1–1	1–1	4–0	3–0	2–3	6–1	1–1	2–1		2–1
NK Zagreb	4–2	3–0	3–3	0–2	1–1	2–5	3–3	0–1	3–2	2–0	4–2	

Source: RSSSF.org
Legend: Blue = home team win; Yellow = draw; Red = away team win.

== Championship group ==
Pos	Team	Pld	W	D	L	GF	GA	GD	Pts	Qualification
1	Hajduk Split (C)	32	20	6	6	66	23	+43	66	Qualification to Champions League second qualifying round
2	Dinamo Zagreb	32	19	8	5	70	36	+34	65	Qualification to UEFA Cup qualifying round
3	Osijek	32	17	6	9	61	47	+14	57	Qualification to UEFA Cup qualifying round
4	Varteks	32	12	9	11	56	56	0	45	Qualification to UEFA Cup qualifying round
5	Slaven Belupo	32	11	11	10	39	37	+2	44	Qualification to Intertoto Cup first round
6	NK Zagreb	32	11	5	16	51	58	−7	38	Qualification to Intertoto Cup first round

Source: RSSSF.org
Rules for classification: 1) points; 2) goal difference; 3) number of goals scored.
(C) Champions

=== Rounds 23–32 results ===
Home \ Away	DIN	HAJ	OSI	SLA	VAR	ZAG
Dinamo Zagreb		1–0	3–1	6–2	0–2	2–0
Hajduk Split	3–1		4–0	1–0	6–0	4–2
Osijek	1–4	0–2		1–1	2–0	2–1
Slaven Belupo	1–1	1–1	1–2		1–2	2–0
Varteks	3–1	2–4	1–2	0–1		1–0
NK Zagreb	0–2	0–2	2–1	0–1	3–3	

Source: RSSSF.org
Legend: Blue = home team win; Yellow = draw; Red = away team win.

== Relegation group ==
Pos	Team	Pld	W	D	L	GF	GA	GD	Pts	Qualification
7	Šibenik	32	12	7	13	40	40	0	43	
8	Čakovec	32	10	9	13	28	37	−9	39	
9	Cibalia	32	5	18	9	31	45	−14	33	
10	Rijeka	32	9	6	17	30	44	−14	33	
11	Hrvatski Dragovoljac	32	8	9	15	35	57	−22	33	
12	Marsonia (O)	32	7	8	17	41	68	−27	29	Qualification to relegation play-off

Source: RSSSF.org
Rules for classification: 1) points; 2) goal difference; 3) number of goals scored.
(O) Play-off winners

=== Rounds 23–32 results ===
Home \ Away	CIB	ČAK	HRD	MAR	RIJ	ŠIB
Cibalia		1–1	1–1	2–2	1–0	1–0
Čakovec	0–0		1–0	1–2	2–0	2–0
Hrvatski Dragovoljac	0–0	1–0		0–0	1–4	1–0
Marsonia	1–1	2–1	2–1		1–3	2–2
Rijeka	1–0	1–1	1–1	2–0		1–2
Šibenik	1–1	2–0	3–1	6–1	3–0	

Source: RSSSF.org
Legend: Blue = home team win; Yellow = draw; Red = away team win.

=== Relegation play-off ===
Due to the expansion of Prva HNL to 16 clubs in the 2001–02 season, four clubs from the 2000–01 Druga HNL were automatically promoted. Those should have been top four clubs, but since third-placed Croatia Sesvete and sixth-placed Belišće had decided to step back from promotion, 1st, 2nd, 4th and 5th placed second-level teams were automatically promoted for the following season (Kamen Ingrad, Pomorac Kostrena, Zadar and TŠK Topolovac respectively). Therefore, the 12th placed Marsonia played a two-legged relegation play-off against the 7th placed team of Druga HNL, Solin. The tie ended in a 5–5 aggregate score and Marsonia won it on away goals, thereby staying in the Prva HNL for the following season.

3 June 2001

Solin Građa	5–2	Marsonia
Giljušić 47'; Turković 60'; Guč 65'; Kalinić 70'; Bačić 87'		Olić 32', 75' (pen.)

Stadion pokraj Jadra, Solin
Attendance: 2,500
Referee: Željko Širić (Osijek)

10 June 2001

Marsonia	3–0	Solin Građa
Olić 45' (pen.), 52', 83' (pen.)

Gradski stadion uz Savu, Slavonski Brod
Attendance: 4,000
Referee: Goran Marić (Zagreb)

== Top goalscorers ==
Rank	Player	Club	Goals
1	(Croatia) Tomislav Šokota	Dinamo Zagreb	20
2	(Bosnia and Herzegovina) Marijo Dodik	Slaven Belupo	17^{1}
3	(Croatia) Ivica Olić	Marsonia	16^{2}
4	(Croatia) Boško Balaban	Dinamo Zagreb	14
4	(Croatia) Stanko Bubalo	Hajduk Split	14
6	(Croatia) Ivan Leko	Hajduk Split	13
7	(Croatia) Paul Matas	Šibenik	12
7	(Croatia) Saša Bjelanović	Varteks	12
9	(Croatia) Zvonimir Deranja	Hajduk Split	11
9	(Croatia) Veldin Karić	Varteks	11
9	(Croatia) Krunoslav Lovrek	NK Zagreb	11

Notes

- ^{1} Including six goals scored in Slaven Belupo's 7–1 home win against Varteks on 22 October 2000, which is the record for most goals scored by a single player in a Prva HNL match.
- ^{2} Ivica Olić scored 11 goals during the regular Prva HNL season and this is the tally as recorded by official records kept by Prva HNL. However, he scored an additional 5 goals in Marsonia's two-legged relegation play-off against second-level side Solin, and the total of 16 goals was included in top scoring tables published in the Croatian media at the end of the season.

== See also ==
- 2000–01 Croatian Football Cup
- 2000–01 Croatian Second Football League
- 2000–01 in Croatian football
