= 2001–02 Croatian First Football League =

Croatian First Football League
- Season: 2001–02
- Champions: NK Zagreb; 1st Croatian title
- Runner up: Hajduk Split
- Relegated: Čakovec; Hrvatski Dragovoljac; Marsonia; TŠK Topolovac
- Champions League: NK Zagreb
- UEFA Cup: Hajduk Split; Dinamo Zagreb; Varteks
- Intertoto Cup: Rijeka; Slaven Belupo
- Matches: 240
- Goals: 680 (2.83 per match)
- Top goalscorer: Ivica Olić (21)
- Biggest home win: Zagreb 8–0 TŠK; Šibenik 8–0 TŠK
- Biggest away win: Osijek 1–6 Dinamo Z.
- Highest scoring: Zagreb 8–0 TŠK; Šibenik 8–0 TŠK
- Average attendance: 2,400

The 2001–02 Croatian First Football League was the eleventh season of the Croatian First Football League, also known as 1. HNL, since its establishment in 1992. NK Zagreb became champions for the first time, and were the first and until 2017 only league winners from outside the Eternal Derby rivalry. The campaign began on 28 July 2001 and ended on 4 May 2002. The league expanded to 16 teams (from 12 in the previous season), and was contested by all the 12 teams who competed in the previous season plus four newly promoted ones from Croatian Second Football League.

The first goal of the season was scored by Dinamo Zagreb's Dario Zahora against newly promoted TŠK Topolovac in the 13th minute of the game on the opening day of the season on 28 July. Miljenko Mumlek of Varteks scored the first hat-trick of the season against Hajduk Split, two of them from penalty kicks, at Poljud on 17 August 2001.

NK Zagreb clinched their first ever title after they drew 0–0 against Čakovec and their last competitor for the title Hajduk Split lost 1–0 to Hrvatski Dragovoljac in the penultimate 29th round of the season which took place on 27 April 2002. It was the third Croatian First Football League title for NK Zagreb manager Zlatko Kranjčar, who thus became the first manager to have won the Prva HNL in charge of two different clubs (in 1996 and 1998 he clinched two championship titles with Croatia Zagreb, renamed Dinamo Zagreb in 2000). The top goalscorer of the season was Ivica Olić with 21 goals scored in 29 appearances for NK Zagreb.

== Promotion and relegation ==
Since it had been decided that the league would expand to 16 teams for the 2001–02 season, only Marsonia were in danger of relegation, having finished last the previous season. Marsonia then played second level side Solin in a two-legged promotion/relegation playoff on 3 and 10 June 2001. The aggregate score was 5–5, but Marsonia won the tie on away goals rule, so no team were relegated.

Teams promoted from 2000–01 Croatian Second Football League:

- Winners: Kamen Ingrad
- Second place: Pomorac
- Fourth place: Zadar
- Fifth place: TŠK Topolovac (Agreed to host home matches at Gradski stadion in the nearby town of Sisak as their own ground was deemed unfit for first-league football.)

=== Summaries ===
The following is an overview of teams which competed in the 2001–02 Prva HNL. The list of managers is correct as of 27 July 2001, the first day of the season.

Locations of teams in 2001–02 Prva HNL

Team	Manager	Home city	Stadium	Capacity
Cibalia	(Croatia) Davor Čop	Vinkovci	Stadion HNK Cibalia	9,920
Čakovec	(Croatia) Rajko Magić	Čakovec	Stadion SRC Mladost	8,000
Dinamo Zagreb	(Croatia) Ilija Lončarević	Zagreb	Stadion Maksimir	37,168
Hajduk Split	(Croatia) Nenad Gračan	Split	Stadion Poljud	35,000
Hrvatski Dragovoljac	(Croatia) Luka Bonačić	Zagreb	Stadion NŠC Stjepan Spajić	5,000
Kamen Ingrad	(Croatia) Tomislav Radić	Velika	Stadion Kamen Ingrad	8,000
Marsonia	(Croatia) Milo Nižetić	Slavonski Brod	Gradski stadion uz Savu	10,000
Osijek	(Croatia) Vlado Bilić	Osijek	Stadion Gradski vrt	19,500
Pomorac	(Croatia) Predrag Stilinović	Kostrena	Stadion Žuknica	3,000
Rijeka	(Croatia) Ivan Katalinić	Rijeka	Stadion Kantrida	10,275
Slaven Belupo	(Croatia) Dražen Besek	Koprivnica	Gradski stadion	4,000
Šibenik	(Croatia) Vjekoslav Lokica	Šibenik	Stadion Šubićevac	8,000
TŠK Topolovac	(Croatia) Ivica Vidović	Topolovac	Gradski stadion	8,000
Varteks	(Croatia) Branko Janžek	Varaždin	Stadion Varteks	10,800
Zadar	(Croatia) Stanko Mršić	Zadar	Stadion Stanovi	5,860
NK Zagreb	(Croatia) Zlatko Kranjčar	Zagreb	Stadion Kranjčevićeva	8,850

=== Managerial changes ===
Team	Outgoing manager	Manner of departure	Date of vacancy	Replaced by	Date of appointment	Position in table
Hajduk Split	(Croatia) Zoran Vulić	Removed from position	4 June 2001	(Croatia) Nenad Gračan	11 June 2001	
Čakovec	(Croatia) Rajko Magić	Sacked	13 October 2001	(Croatia) Miljenko Dovečer	13 October 2001	
Hajduk Split	(Croatia) Nenad Gračan	Sacked	22 November 2001	(Croatia) Slaven Bilić	22 November 2001	
Kamen Ingrad	(Croatia) Tomislav Radić	Removed from position	23 December 2001	(Croatia) Rajko Magić	23 December 2001	
Dinamo Zagreb	(Croatia) Ilija Lončarević	Sacked	14 April 2002	(Croatia) Marijan Vlak (c)	14 April 2002	

== League table ==
Pos	Team	Pld	W	D	L	GF	GA	GD	Pts	Qualification or relegation
1	NK Zagreb (C)	30	20	7	3	71	24	+47	67	Qualification to Champions League second qualifying round
2	Hajduk Split	30	20	5	5	61	28	+33	65	Qualification to UEFA Cup qualifying round
3	Dinamo Zagreb	30	18	5	7	58	30	+28	59	Qualification to UEFA Cup first round
4	Varteks	30	17	6	7	58	40	+18	57	Qualification to UEFA Cup qualifying round
5	Rijeka	30	15	6	9	46	37	+9	51	Qualification to Intertoto Cup first round
6	Slaven Belupo	30	11	9	10	34	36	−2	42	Qualification to Intertoto Cup first round
7	Pomorac	30	12	4	14	36	41	−5	40	
8	Osijek	30	11	4	15	45	48	−3	37	
9	Zadar	30	9	9	12	43	47	−4	36	
10	Cibalia	30	9	9	12	34	37	−3	36	
11	Šibenik (O)	30	10	6	14	33	36	−3	36	Qualification to relegation play-offs
12	Kamen Ingrad (O)	30	9	8	13	28	46	−18	35	Qualification to relegation play-offs
13	Hrvatski Dragovoljac (R)	30	9	7	14	34	45	−11	34	Relegation to Croatian Second Football League
14	Čakovec (R)	30	9	5	16	31	44	−13	32	Relegation to Croatian Second Football League
15	Marsonia (R)	30	8	6	16	37	46	−9	30	Relegation to Croatian Second Football League
16	TŠK Topolovac (R)	30	4	2	24	31	95	−64	14	Relegation to Croatian Second Football League

Source: RSSSF.org
Rules for classification: 1) points; 2) goal difference; 3) number of goals scored.
(C) Champions; (O) Play-off winners; (R) Relegated

=== Relegation play-offs ===
First legs were held on 15 May and second legs on 19 May, 2002.

Team 1	Agg.	Team 2	1st leg	2nd leg
Vukovar '91	3–4	Šibenik	0–0	3–4
Istra Pula	1–3	Kamen Ingrad	0–1	1–2

== Results ==
Home \ Away	CIB	ČAK	DIN	HAJ	HRD	KAM	MAR	OSI	POM	RIJ	SLA	ŠIB	TŠK	VAR	ZAD	ZAG
Cibalia		2–0	1–2	1–1	2–0	1–0	3–2	1–0	4–3	1–1	0–2	2–0	1–3	0–1	1–1	2–1
Čakovec	2–2		0–2	0–3	2–0	2–0	3–1	0–2	0–0	0–1	0–0	2–0	2–1	1–1	3–0	0–0
Dinamo Zagreb	2–1	1–0		1–2	2–1	4–0	3–1	2–1	4–0	2–3	4–1	2–0	3–2	5–0	0–0	3–3
Hajduk Split	1–0	3–0	2–1		1–1	5–0	0–0	2–2	3–0	4–1	4–1	1–0	4–0	1–5	1–0	0–2
Hrvatski Dragovoljac	2–1	2–1	1–1	1–0		0–1	2–0	2–2	5–1	3–0	1–1	0–4	3–2	1–3	1–0	0–1
Kamen Ingrad	1–1	3–2	1–0	1–3	0–0		2–4	2–4	2–1	2–0	1–0	1–1	1–0	1–2	1–1	1–0
Marsonia	2–1	1–2	1–2	1–2	0–0	1–0		2–0	1–0	1–4	1–1	1–2	3–0	1–1	2–3	1–2
Osijek	0–0	1–2	0–3	1–2	6–1	2–1	4–1		1–0	1–0	0–0	2–0	4–1	1–2	2–0	1–6
Pomorac	2–0	2–1	1–2	0–1	2–0	0–1	0–1	1–0		0–1	1–0	0–0	4–0	2–1	2–0	1–0
Rijeka	1–1	2–1	1–0	1–2	3–2	4–1	1–0	4–0	2–2		1–0	5–0	2–0	1–1	1–1	0–1
Slaven Belupo	0–0	2–0	0–0	3–1	2–1	4–1	1–0	2–0	3–0	2–2		1–0	1–0	2–2	2–1	2–2
Šibenik	1–1	1–0	0–0	1–2	0–0	1–0	1–0	1–0	1–2	0–1	3–0		8–0	1–0	2–0	2–3
TŠK Topolovac	0–3	1–3	2–4	2–5	0–4	1–1	0–5	1–3	1–3	2–3	4–1	1–1		4–1	2–1	0–2
Varteks	2–1	2–1	2–0	0–0	2–0	1–1	3–0	2–1	1–2	2–0	2–0	3–0	4–0		5–1	1–4
Zadar	1–0	4–1	1–2	1–5	2–0	0–0	2–2	4–3	1–1	2–0	2–0	3–2	7–1	3–4		0–0
NK Zagreb	3–0	4–0	2–1	1–0	3–0	1–1	1–1	3–1	4–3	3–0	2–0	3–0	8–0	5–2	1–1	

Source: RSSSF.org
Legend: Blue = home team win; Yellow = draw; Red = away team win.

== Top goalscorers ==
Rank	Player	Club	Goals
1	(Croatia) Ivica Olić	NK Zagreb	21
2	(Croatia) Saša Bjelanović	Varteks	16
3	(Bosnia and Herzegovina) Admir Hasančić	NK Zagreb	14
3	(Croatia) Dario Zahora	Dinamo Zagreb	14
5	(Croatia) Tomislav Erceg	Hajduk Split	13
5	(Croatia) Marin Lalić	Hrvatski Dragovoljac	13
5	(Croatia) Natko Rački	Rijeka	13
5	(Croatia) Zoran Zekić	Zadar	13
9	(Croatia) Mate Dragičević	Šibenik	12
10	(Croatia) Zvonimir Deranja	Hajduk Split	11
10	(Croatia) Petar Krpan	NK Zagreb	11

Source: 1.hnl.net (in Croatian)

== See also ==
- 2001–02 Croatian Second Football League
- 2001–02 Croatian Football Cup
