= Football records and statistics in Croatia =

This article details records and statistics related to football in Croatia, with a focus on the Croatian football league system. It includes data for Croatian football following the Croatian Football Federation's admittance into FIFA on 3 July 1992 and UEFA on 16 June 1993.

== National team ==
Croatia fields men's, women's and youth national football teams in international competition and have their official records maintained by the Croatian Football Federation, FIFA, and UEFA.

== Croatian First Football League ==
As of 27 November 2020

=== Club records ===
==== Appearances and results ====
- Titles
  - Most titles: Dinamo Zagreb (21)
  - Most consecutive titles: Dinamo Zagreb (11)
- Appearances and relegation
  - Most seasons in the top flight: Dinamo Zagreb, Hajduk Split, Rijeka, Osijek (30)
  - Fewest seasons in the top flight: Dubrava, Lučko, Neretva, Orijent, Samobor, TŠK Topolovac, Vukovar '91 (1)
  - Most times relegated: Cibalia, Zadar (4)
- Most matches played: Osijek, Rijeka (951)
- Wins
  - Most wins: Dinamo Zagreb (661)
  - Most wins in a season: Dinamo Zagreb (30, 2006–07)
  - Fewest wins in a season: Dubrovnik, Šibenik (2, 1992), Varaždin (2, 2011–12)
- Draws
  - Most draws: Rijeka (253)
  - Most draws in a season: Cibalia (18, 2000–01)
  - Fewest draws in a season: Cibalia (0, 1996–97)
- Defeats
  - Most defeats: Osijek (334)
  - Most defeats in a season: Radnik (29, 1993–94)
  - Fewest defeats in a season: Dinamo Zagreb (0, 2014–15)
- Goals
  - Most goals scored: Dinamo Zagreb (2080)
  - Most goals scored in a season: Dinamo Zagreb (98, 1993–94)
  - Fewest goals scored in a season: Dubrovnik (4, 1992)
  - Most goals conceded: Osijek (1218)
  - Most goals conceded in a season: Radnik (109, 1993–94)
  - Fewest goals conceded in a season: NK Zagreb (9, 1992)

==== Scorelines ====
- Biggest win: Hajduk Split 10–0 Radnik (5 June 1994)
- Biggest away win: Radnik 0–7 Osijek (30 April 1994); Istra 1961 0–7 Rijeka (4 May 2019)
- Highest scoring: Dinamo Zagreb 10–1 Pazinka (12 December 1993)
- Highest scoring draw: Rijeka 4–4 Cibalia (27 August 1995); Rijeka 4–4 Inter Zaprešić (15 October 1995); Zadar 4–4 Rijeka (11 September 2011)

==== Runs and streaks ====
- Longest winning streak: Dinamo Zagreb (28)
  - Home: Dinamo Zagreb (29)
  - Away: Dinamo Zagreb (12)
- Longest unbeaten run: Dinamo Zagreb (50)
  - Home: Dinamo Zagreb (103)
  - Away: Dinamo Zagreb (24)
- Longest winless run: Istra 1961 (30)
  - Home: Istra 1961 (15)
  - Away: Međimurje (31)
- Longest losing streak: TŠK Topolovac (16)
  - Home: Rudeš, Inter Zaprešić (8)
  - Away: Međimurje (17)
- Longest drawing streak: Šibenik (6)
  - Home: Zadar (6)
  - Away: Slaven Belupo (7)
- Longest scoring run: Dinamo Zagreb (61)
  - Home: Dinamo Zagreb (70)
  - Away: Dinamo Zagreb (30)
- Longest conceding run: TŠK Topolovac, Varaždin (30)
  - Home: Osijek (21)
  - Away: Istra (42)
- Longest scoreless run: RNK Split (12)
  - Home: RNK Split, Inter Zaprešić (6)
  - Away: Neretva, Slaven Belupo, RNK Split (9)
- Longest run without conceding: Dinamo Zagreb (10)
  - Home: Dinamo Zagreb, Hajduk Split, Pazinka, NK Zagreb (8)
  - Away: Dinamo Zagreb (7)

=== Individual records ===
==== Appearances ====
- Most appearances: 478, Jakov Surać
- Most minutes played: 35,138 minutes, Jakov Surać
- Most appearances (foreign players): 293, Edin Mujčin
- Appearances in most seasons: 22, Jakov Surać
- Appearances for most clubs: 8, Željko Ačkar, Vedran Celiščak, Domagoj Kosić, Anđelko Kvesić, Krunoslav Rendulić, Zoran Zekić
- Most used substitute: 99, Hrvoje Štrok
- Most substituted: 127, Miljenko Mumlek
- Youngest player: Marko Dabro (16 years, 2 days)
- Oldest player: Vanja Iveša (40 years, 276 days)
- Oldest débutante: Vlado Benšak (37 years, 96 days)

==== Goals ====
- Most goals: 146, Davor Vugrinec
  - By a foreign player: 84, Marijo Dodik
  - In one season: 34, Eduardo (2006–07)
  - In one match: 6, Marijo Dodik (Slaven Belupo 7–1 Varteks, 21 October 2000)
  - From the penalty spot: 29, Ivan Krstanović
  - As a substitute: 20, Ivan Krstanović
  - On debut: 2, Domagoj Abramović, Ardian Kozniku, Ante Milicic, Mario Ćuže
  - Against single opposition: 14, Igor Cvitanović (v. Osijek), Davor Vugrinec (v. Osijek), Ivan Krstanović (v. Hajduk Split, v. Istra 1961)
- Scored in most seasons: 17, Miljenko Mumlek
- Most own goals: 4, Marin Oršulić
- Youngest goalscorer: Lovro Zvonarek (16 years, 14 days)
- Oldest goalscorer: Ivan Krstanović (40 years, 112 days)
- Fastest goal: 10 seconds, Edin Šaranović (Kamen Ingrad 1–0 Inter Zaprešić, 3 April 2004)
- Most appearances without scoring (outfield players only): 223, Boris Leutar

==== Goalkeeping ====
- Most appearances: 304, Ivica Solomun
- Most clean sheets: 100, Ivica Solomun
- Longest run without conceding a goal: 951 minutes, Ivan Kelava
- Most saved penalties: 6, Goran Blažević, Tihomir Bulat, Mladen Matković, Dominik Livaković

==== Disciplinary ====
- Most yellow cards: 104, Damir Vuica
- Most red cards: 12, Krunoslav Rendulić
- Most appearances without a card: 77, Kristijan Kahlina

==== Managerial ====
- Most appearances for a manager: 460, Stanko Mršić
- Most wins for a manager: 156, Stanko Mršić
- Most draws for a manager: 133, Stanko Mršić
- Most defeats for a manager: 171, Stanko Mršić
- Most clubs managed: 11, Luka Bonačić
- Managed a club in most seasons: 21, Stanko Mršić
- Youngest manager: Marko Lozo (28 years, 143 days)
- Oldest manager: Miroslav Blažević (79 years, 302 days)
- Longest-serving manager (per appointment): 2045 days, Matjaž Kek (27 February 2013 to 6 October 2018)

== Croatian Football Cup ==
As of 27 November 2020

=== Club records ===
==== Appearances and results ====
- Most titles: Dinamo Zagreb (15)
- Most appearances: Dinamo Zagreb, Hajduk Split, Inter Zaprešić, Rijeka, Osijek (29)
- Most final appearances: Dinamo Zagreb (22)
- Most final appearances without winning the title: Varaždin (6)
- Number of teams that have reached the final: 13
- Number of teams that have reached the final but failed to win: 8
- Most matches played: Dinamo Zagreb (191)
- Most wins: Dinamo Zagreb (141)
- Most draws: Hajduk Split (33)
- Most defeats: Osijek, Varaždin (36)
- Most goals scored: Dinamo Zagreb (518)
- Most goals conceded: Hajduk Split (151)

==== Scorelines ====
- Biggest win: Gaj Mače 20–2 NK Lika 95 Korenica, 2020–21
- Biggest aggregate win: MIV Sračinec 1–21 (0–11, 1–10) Dinamo Zagreb, 1995–96
- Highest scoring: Gaj Mače 20–2 NK Lika 95 Korenica, 2020–21

=== Individual records ===
==== Appearances ====
- Most appearances: 70, Miljenko Mumlek
- Most final appearances: 14, Dražen Ladić

==== Goals ====
- Most goals: 33, Davor Vugrinec
- Most goals (cup final): 5, Igor Cvitanović
- Most goals (season): 13, Goran Vlaović (1992–93)
- Most goals (match): 8, Andrej Kramarić (Rijeka 11–0 Zmaj Blato, 9 October 2013)
- Most goals (as a substitute): 6, Tomo Šokota, Mark Viduka

==== Disciplinary ====
- Most yellow cards: 13, Josip Milardović
- Most red cards: 3, Zoran Ratković
- Most appearances without a card: 35, Tomislav Butina

==== Managerial ====
- Most appearances for a manager: 47, Stanko Mršić
- Most final appearances for a manager: 6, Miroslav Blažević, Zlatko Kranjčar, Elvis Scoria
- Most wins for a manager: 25, Matjaž Kek
- Most draws for a manager: 10, Stanko Mršić
- Most defeats for a manager: 14, Stanko Mršić

== UEFA competitions ==
As of 9 December 2021

=== Club records ===
==== Appearances and results ====
- Overall
  - Most matches played: Dinamo Zagreb (253)
  - Most wins: Dinamo Zagreb (106)
  - Most draws: Dinamo Zagreb (52)
  - Most defeats: Dinamo Zagreb (95)
  - Most goals scored: Dinamo Zagreb (376)
  - Most goals conceded: Dinamo Zagreb (327)
- Champions League
  - Most matches played: Dinamo Zagreb (140)
  - Most wins: Dinamo Zagreb (59)
  - Most draws: Dinamo Zagreb (29)
  - Most defeats: Dinamo Zagreb (52)
  - Most goals scored: Dinamo Zagreb (209)
  - Most goals conceded: Dinamo Zagreb (192)
- Europa League
  - Most matches played: Dinamo Zagreb (111)
  - Most wins: Dinamo Zagreb (46)
  - Most draws: Dinamo Zagreb (23)
  - Most defeats: Dinamo Zagreb (42)
  - Most goals scored: Dinamo Zagreb (164)
  - Most goals conceded: Dinamo Zagreb (131)
- Europa Conference League
  - Most matches played: Rijeka (6)
  - Most wins: Rijeka (3)
  - Most draws: Rijeka, Osijek (2)
  - Most defeats: Rijeka, Osijek, Hajduk Split (1)
  - Most goals scored: Rijeka (9)
  - Most goals conceded: Rijeka, Osijek (5)
- Cup Winners' Cup
  - Most matches played: Varteks (10)
  - Most wins: Varteks (6)
  - Most draws: Varteks (1)
  - Most defeats: Varteks (3)
  - Most goals scored: Varteks (15)
  - Most goals conceded: Varteks (10)
- Intertoto Cup
  - Most matches played: Slaven Belupo (34)
  - Most wins: Slaven Belupo (17)
  - Most draws: Slaven Belupo (7)
  - Most defeats: Slaven Belupo (10)
  - Most goals scored: Slaven Belupo (50)
  - Most goals conceded: Slaven Belupo (30)

=== Individual records ===
==== Appearances ====
- Most appearances (overall): 91, Arijan Ademi
- Most appearances (Champions League): 49, Arijan Ademi
- Most appearances (Europa League): 43, Ivan Tomečak
- Most appearances (Europa Conference League): 6, six players
- Most appearances (Cup Winners' Cup): 10, Dražen Madunović
- Most appearances (Intertoto Cup): 28, Petar Bošnjak

==== Goals ====
- Most goals (overall): 21, Mislav Oršić
- Most goals (Champions League): 10, Hillal Soudani, Mislav Oršić
- Most goals (Europa League): 11, Mislav Oršić
- Most goals (Europa Conference League): 2, Prince Ampem, Denis Bušnja, Marin Ljubičić
- Most goals (Cup Winners' Cup): 5, Miljenko Mumlek
- Most goals (Intertoto Cup): 15, Marijo Dodik

== Most successful clubs overall ==
As of 23 May 2026

| Club | Domestic Titles | | | | International Titles | | | Overall titles |
| Club | League Croatia & Yugoslavia | Cup Croatia & Yugoslavia | Croatian Football Super Cup | Total | Inter-Cities Fairs Cup | Balkans Cup | Total | Overall titles |
|---|---|---|---|---|---|---|---|---|
| Dinamo Zagreb | 38 | 26 | 8 | 72 | 1 | 1 | 2 | 74 |
| Hajduk Split | 18 | 17 | 5 | 40 | - | - | - | 40 |
| Rijeka | 2 | 9 | 1 | 12 | - | 1 | 1 | 13 |
| Concordia | 3 | - | - | 3 | - | - | - | 3 |
| HAŠK | 1 | 1 | - | 2 | - | - | - | 2 |
| Zagreb | 1 | - | - | 1 | - | - | - | 1 |
| Inter Zaprešić | - | 1 | - | 1 | - | - | - | 1 |
| Osijek | - | 1 | - | 1 | - | - | - | 1 |

== Bibliography ==
- Croatian Football Statistics (www.hrnogomet.com) (in Croatian)
