= 2000–01 Croatian Second Football League =

Druga HNL
- Season: 2000–01
- Champions: Kamen Ingrad
- Promoted: Kamen Ingrad; Pomorac Kostrena; Zadar; TŠK Topolovac
- Relegated: Jadran Poreč

The 2000–01 Druga HNL was the 10th season of Druga HNL, the second level league in Croatian football. The format of the league was unchanged from the 1999–2000 season. A total of 18 clubs competed in Druga HNL this season, in a double round-robin format.

Due to the expansion of top level Prva HNL set for the 2001–02 season, four clubs were promoted at the end of season (Kamen Ingrad, Pomorac Kostrena, Zadar and TŠK Topolovac, while Solin entered promotion playoff). Also, Druga HNL was split into two divisions the following season.

== Clubs ==
Club	City / Town	Stadium	Capacity	1999–2000 result
Belišće	Belišće	Gradski stadion Belišće	4,000	
Bjelovar	Bjelovar	Gradski stadion Bjelovar	4,000	
Croatia Sesvete	Sesvete	Stadion ŠRC Sesvete	3,500	
Imotska Krajina	Proložac	Stadion Šarampov	1,000	
Istra Pula	Pula	Stadion Aldo Drosina	7,000	
Jadran Poreč	Poreč	Stadion Veli Jože	2,000	
Kamen Ingrad	Velika	Stadion Kamen Ingrada	8,000	
Koprivnica	Koprivnica	Gradski stadion u Koprivnici	3,400	
Mosor	Žrnovnica	Igralište Pricviće	3,000	
Orijent	Rijeka	Stadion SC Krimeja	4,000	
Pomorac	Kostrena	Stadion Žuknica	3,500	
Segesta	Sisak	Gradski stadion Sisak	8,000	
Solin Građa	Solin	Stadion pokraj Jadra	4,000	
TŠK Topolovac	Topolovac	Park grofova	1,000	
PIK Vrbovec	Vrbovec	Gradski stadion kraj Sajmišta	3,000	
Vukovar '91	Vukovar	Gradski stadion Borovo Naselje	6,000	
Zadar	Zadar	Stadion Stanovi	5,860	
Žminj	Žminj	Igralište Žminja	1,000	

== League table ==
Pos	Team	Pld	W	D	L	GF	GA	GD	Pts	Promotion or relegation
1	Kamen Ingrad (C, P)	34	23	5	6	78	32	+46	74	Promotion to Croatian First Football League (Note: Due to the expansion of Prva HNL to 16 clubs in the 2001–02 season, top four clubs from the 2000–01 Druga HNL were to be automatically promoted. However, third-placed Croatia Sesvete and sixth-placed Belišće had decided to step back from promotion. Therefore, 7th placed team of Druga HNL, Solin played a two-legged relegation play-off against the 12th placed team of Prva HNL, Marsonia.)
2	Pomorac (P)	34	21	7	6	80	30	+50	70	Promotion to Croatian First Football League
3	Croatia Sesvete	34	20	5	9	61	33	+28	65	Promotion to Croatian First Football League
4	Zadar (P)	34	18	7	9	40	30	+10	61	Promotion to Croatian First Football League
5	TŠK Topolovac (P)	34	18	5	11	73	54	+19	59	
6	Belišće	34	16	7	11	48	35	+13	55	
7	Solin Građa	34	14	9	11	44	46	−2	51	Qualification to promotion play-off
8	Mosor	34	15	5	14	43	41	+2	50	
9	PIK Vrbovec	34	14	6	14	51	56	−5	48	
10	Orijent	34	13	8	13	40	40	0	47	
11	Segesta	34	13	7	14	38	47	−9	46	
12	Vukovar '91	34	13	5	16	56	59	−3	44	
13	Bjelovar	34	12	8	14	43	52	−9	44	
14	Istra Pula	34	10	11	13	44	44	0	41	
15	Koprivnica	34	9	6	19	41	65	−24	33	
16	Žminj	34	8	6	20	35	67	−32	30	
17	Imotska Krajina	34	5	10	19	28	57	−29	25	
18	Jadran Poreč (R)	34	2	7	25	22	77	−55	13	Qualification to relegation play-off

Source: RSSSF.org
Rules for classification: 1) points; 2) goal difference; 3) number of goals scored.
(C) Champions; (P) Promoted; (R) Relegated

== Results ==
Home \ Away	BEL	BJE	SES	IKR	IST	JAD	KAM	KOP	MOS	ORI	POM	SEG	SOL	TŠK	VRB	VUK	ZAD	ŽMI
Belišće		4–0	1–0	0–0	3–0	2–1	1–2	1–0	2–0	1–0	1–2	3–1	1–0	1–1	3–1	3–2	0–0	2–0
Bjelovar	3–0		1–5	2–1	0–0	1–1	1–2	3–2	2–0	3–2	1–1	2–0	0–1	2–2	2–1	1–0	2–0	1–1
Croatia Sesvete	4–3	2–1		6–0	1–3	3–0	0–0	2–0	2–1	2–1	1–4	0–0	3–0	2–3	2–0	3–0	1–0	4–0
Imotska Krajina	1–2	3–0	1–2		1–1	2–1	0–0	1–0	0–0	1–1	0–3	0–0	2–2	1–1	1–5	2–3	1–0	6–0
Istra Pula	0–1	1–2	0–0	3–0		3–1	1–0	1–1	3–1	0–1	2–0	3–0	1–3	0–1	2–2	2–0	0–2	4–1
Jadran Poreč	0–2	0–1	0–2	0–0	1–1		2–2	0–0	0–1	0–1	1–4	1–2	0–1	1–6	1–2	2–3	1–1	1–0
Kamen Ingrad	1–0	2–1	1–0	5–0	3–1	8–0		5–1	2–0	2–1	3–0	3–2	2–0	2–4	4–2	4–0	2–0	2–0
Koprivnica	1–1	2–2	1–4	3–0	2–1	0–2	2–3		2–1	0–0	1–4	1–3	4–1	0–2	2–1	4–1	0–3	3–1
Mosor	1–0	2–1	1–0	2–1	3–0	3–0	2–1	1–2		4–0	2–4	2–1	1–2	3–0	3–1	2–0	0–0	2–0
Orijent	3–1	1–1	0–1	1–0	1–1	1–0	1–2	4–0	0–0		1–1	2–1	2–0	5–2	1–0	2–0	1–1	2–1
Pomorac	2–0	2–1	0–1	2–0	1–2	6–1	1–1	1–2	6–0	3–0		3–1	3–1	4–0	1–0	0–0	6–0	2–1
Segesta	2–2	0–2	1–1	1–0	2–1	3–2	2–1	2–1	1–1	2–1	0–3		0–2	2–0	2–1	1–0	0–1	1–0
Solin Građa	2–1	1–0	1–1	2–0	2–2	3–0	2–1	0–0	0–0	1–2	2–2	0–2		2–1	0–0	3–1	3–0	3–1
TŠK Topolovac	0–3	2–1	4–0	4–1	1–1	4–0	0–1	5–1	2–1	2–1	1–2	3–0	2–2		5–0	3–2	3–0	5–2
PIK Vrbovec	2–1	3–3	0–3	1–0	3–1	1–0	3–1	2–1	2–1	2–0	0–0	2–1	1–1	6–1		2–2	1–4	1–0
Vukovar '91	1–1	2–0	2–0	1–1	2–2	3–0	1–6	1–0	3–0	3–0	0–5	2–1	6–0	1–2	4–1		3–0	5–0
Zadar	1–0	5–0	1–0	1–0	1–0	1–1	0–3	4–1	1–0	0–0	1–0	0–0	2–0	2–0	3–1	2–0		1–0
Žminj	1–1	1–0	2–3	2–1	1–1	4–1	1–1	2–1	0–2	2–1	2–2	1–1	2–1	2–1	0–1	4–2	0–2	

Source: RSSSF.org
Legend: Blue = home team win; Yellow = draw; Red = away team win.

== See also ==
- 2000–01 Prva HNL
- 2000–01 Croatian Cup
