= Mario Garba =

Croatian footballer

Personal information
- Full name: Mario Garba
- Date of birth: 13 February 1977 (age 49)
- Place of birth: Sisak, SFR Yugoslavia
- Height: 5 ft 9 in (1.75 m)
- Position: Midfielder

Youth career
- 1987–1995: Segesta Sisak

Senior career*
Years	Team	Apps	(Gls)
1995–2001	TŠK Topolovac		
2002–2003	Kamen Ingrad	21	(1)
2003–2004	Segesta Sisak	27	(2)
2004	Cerezo Osaka	4	(0)
2005	Naftaš Ivanić	14	(4)
2005	Segesta Sisak	17	(5)
2006	Croatia Sesvete	7	(0)
2006–2007	Hrvatski Dragovoljac	27	(2)
2007–2008	Segesta Sisak	24	(2)
2008	PAS Hamedan	5	(0)
2008–2010	Imotski	30	(3)
2010–2012	Međimurje	39	(14)
2012–2013	Segesta Sisak	24	(5)
2013	Konavljanin	14	(3)
2014	Savski Marof		
2014–2015	Lekenik		
2015–2016	Metalac Sisak	24	(0)
2016	Lekenik		
2017–2019	Segesta Sisak		
2019–2021	Lekenik		
- * Club domestic league appearances and goals as of 12 October 2015 (UTC)

Mario Garba (born 13 February 1977 in Sisak) is a Croatian retired professional footballer who last played for Croatian club NK Lekenik.

== Club career ==
Garba started with football in his native Sisak, with HNK Segesta before moving to the then-upward bound lower-tier side TŠK from the nearby village of Topolovac. TŠK was eventually promoted to the Prva HNL for the 2001/2002 season, and, having participated in 16 matches with 3 goals, he was picked up by NK Kamen Ingrad. After a 1.5 years in Velika, he played mostly for a series of Druga HNL teams, with short stints in Japan's Cerezo Osaka and PAS Hamedan F.C. in the Iran Pro League.
