= Želimir =

- Gender: Male
- Language: Serbo-Croatian

Origin
- Meaning: the one who wish peace

Other names
- Related names: Željko, Željka, Željan, Željana

Želimir is a masculine given name. People bearing the name include:

- Želimir Altarac Čičak (1947–2021), Bosnian rock promoter
- Želimir Bebek (born 1945), Bosnian singer
- Želimir Cerović (1948–2019), Montenegrin basketball executive and basketball player
- Želimir Obradović (born 1960), Serbian professional basketball head coach
- Želimir Puljić (born 1947), Croatian archbishop
- Želimir Stinčić (born 1950), Croatian footballer
- Želimir Terkeš (born 1981), Bosnian-Herzegovinian football striker
- Želimir Vidović (1953–1992), Bosnian footballer
- Želimir Vuković (born 1983), Serbian alpine skier
- Želimir Žilnik (born 1942), Serbian film director

== See also ==
- Željko
