= Željko Vuković =

Željko Vuković may refer to:

- Željko Vuković (footballer, born 1962), Croatian and Austrian international footballer
- Željko Vuković (footballer, born 1963), Montenegrin footballer
