= List of GNK Dinamo Zagreb managers =

GNK Dinamo Zagreb is a professional football club based in Zagreb, capital of Croatia, which plays in the Croatian Football League and host their games at Stadion Maksimir.

This list includes all individuals who held the position of manager of the first team of Dinamo Zagreb from 1945, when the first professional manager was appointed, to the present day. Caretaker managers are also included, where known.

Since its foundation in 1945 until the end of the 1990–91 season Dinamo played in the Yugoslav league system, and during this time won four 1. Federal League titles, and seven Marshal Tito Cups. After Croatia's independence and the breakup of Yugoslavia Dinamo was a founding member of the new Croatian league launched in the 1991–92 season, and went on to win 25 Croatian league titles, 17 Croatian Cups, and eight Super Cups. The club has thus spent its entire existence playing top level football.

The first manager of Dinamo Zagreb was Márton Bukovi, who joined the club along with a number of players from pre-war local clubs Građanski Zagreb, HAŠK and Concordia, which had all been disbanded just after the end of World War II in 1945. Bukovi was in charge of Dinamo from 1945 to 1947, and over the following three decades managers were mostly former players from Građanski (Mirko Kokotović, Franjo Glaser, Bernard Hügl, Milan Antolković, Ivan Jazbinšek, Gustav Lechner, Branko Zebec and Stjepan Bobek), HAŠK (Bruno Knežević, Zlatko Čajkovski), and Concordia (Bogdan Cuvaj).

The only manager to win trophies in both the Yugoslav and Croatian eras, and the only one to win all five domestic honours available, was Miroslav Blažević, who had four separate spells with Dinamo between 1980 and 2003. The only manager to win an international trophy with Dinamo was former player Ivica Horvat, who managed the team in the 1967 Inter-Cities Fairs Cup final.

There were only five non-Yugoslav managers in the history of the club: Márton Bukovi (1945–47 and 1960–61), Karl Mütsch (1947–48), Osvaldo Ardiles (1999), Ivaylo Petev (2016–17) and Fabio Cannavaro (2024–present). The only two non-Croatian managers from former Yugoslavia to take over the team since Croatia's independence were Vahid Halilhodžić (2010–11) and Sergej Jakirović (2023–24).

== List of managers ==
- (Hungary) Márton Bukovi (1945–1947)
- (Socialist Federal Republic of Yugoslavia) Mirko Kokotović (1947)
- (Austria) Karl Mütsch (1947–1948)
- (Socialist Federal Republic of Yugoslavia) Franjo Glaser (1948–1949)
- (Socialist Federal Republic of Yugoslavia) Bruno Knežević (1949)
- (Socialist Federal Republic of Yugoslavia) Bernard Hügl (1949–1952)
- (Socialist Federal Republic of Yugoslavia) Milan Antolković (1952–1953)
- (Socialist Federal Republic of Yugoslavia) Ivan Jazbinšek (1953–1955)
- (Socialist Federal Republic of Yugoslavia) Bogdan Cuvaj (1955–1956)
- (Socialist Federal Republic of Yugoslavia) Milan Antolković (1956–1957)
- (Socialist Federal Republic of Yugoslavia) Gustav Lechner (1957–1959)
- (Socialist Federal Republic of Yugoslavia) Milan Antolković (1959–1960)
- (Hungary) Márton Bukovi (1960–1961)
- (Socialist Federal Republic of Yugoslavia) Milan Antolković (1961–1964)
- (Socialist Federal Republic of Yugoslavia) Vlatko Konjevod (1964–1965)
- (Socialist Federal Republic of Yugoslavia) Milan Antolković (1965)
- (Socialist Federal Republic of Yugoslavia) Ivan Jazbinšek (1965–1966)
- (Socialist Federal Republic of Yugoslavia) Branko Zebec (1966–1967)
- (Socialist Federal Republic of Yugoslavia) Ivica Horvat (1967–1970)
- (Socialist Federal Republic of Yugoslavia) Zlatko Čajkovski (1970–1971)
- (Socialist Federal Republic of Yugoslavia) Dražan Jerković (1971–1972)
- (Socialist Federal Republic of Yugoslavia) Stjepan Bobek (1972)
- (Socialist Federal Republic of Yugoslavia) Domagoj Kapetanović (1973)
- (Socialist Federal Republic of Yugoslavia) Ivan Marković (1973–1974)
- (Socialist Federal Republic of Yugoslavia) Mirko Bazić (1974–1977)
- (Socialist Federal Republic of Yugoslavia) Rudolf Belin (1977–1978)
- (Socialist Federal Republic of Yugoslavia) Vlatko Marković (1978–1980)
- (Socialist Federal Republic of Yugoslavia) Ivan Marković (1980)
- (Socialist Federal Republic of Yugoslavia) Miroslav Blažević (1980–1983)
- (Socialist Federal Republic of Yugoslavia) Rudolf Belin (1983)
- (Socialist Federal Republic of Yugoslavia) Vlatko Marković (1983)
- (Socialist Federal Republic of Yugoslavia) Branko Zebec (1984)
- (Socialist Federal Republic of Yugoslavia) Tomislav Ivić (1984–85)
- (Socialist Federal Republic of Yugoslavia) Zdenko Kobeščak (1985)
- (Socialist Federal Republic of Yugoslavia) Miroslav Blažević (1986–1988)
- (Socialist Federal Republic of Yugoslavia) Josip Skoblar (1988–1989)
- (Socialist Federal Republic of Yugoslavia) Rudolf Belin (1989)
- (Socialist Federal Republic of Yugoslavia) Josip Kuže (1989–1990)
- (Croatia) Vlatko Marković (1990–1991)
- (Croatia) Zdenko Kobeščak (1991–1992)
- (Croatia) Vlatko Marković (1992)
- (Croatia) Miroslav Blažević (1992–1994)
- (Croatia) Ivan Bedi (1994)
- (Croatia) Zlatko Kranjčar (1994–1996)
- (Croatia) Otto Barić (1996–1997)
- (Croatia) Marijan Vlak (1997–1998)
- (Croatia) Zlatko Kranjčar (1998)
- (Croatia) Ivan Bedi / (Croatia) Hrvoje Braović (1998)
- (Croatia) Velimir Zajec (1998–1999)
- (Croatia) Ilija Lončarević (1999)
- (Argentina) Osvaldo Ardiles (1999)
- (Croatia) Marijan Vlak (1999–2000)
- (Croatia) Hrvoje Braović (2000–2001)
- (Croatia) Ilija Lončarević (2001–2002)
- (Croatia) Marijan Vlak (2002)
- (Croatia) Miroslav Blažević (2002–2003)
- (Croatia) Nikola Jurčević (2003–2004)
- (Croatia) Đuro Bago (2004)
- (Croatia) Nenad Gračan (Sept 1, 2004 – Dec 1, 2004)
- (Croatia) Ilija Lončarević (2005)
- (Croatia) Zvjezdan Cvetković (2005)
- (Croatia) Josip Kuže (Jun 1, 2005 – Nov 5, 2006)
- (Croatia) Branko Ivanković (Nov 6, 2006 – Jan 14, 2008)
- (Croatia) Zvonimir Soldo (Jan 15, 2008 – May 14, 2008)
- (Croatia) Branko Ivanković (Jul 1, 2008 – Nov 24, 2008)
- (Croatia) Marijan Vlak (Nov 24, 2008 – Mar 5, 2009)
- (Croatia) Krunoslav Jurčić (Mar 5, 2009 – May 19, 2010)
- (Croatia) Velimir Zajec (May 25, 2010 – Aug 10, 2010)
- (Croatia) Sreten Ćuk (interim) (Jul 20, 2010)
- (Bosnia and Herzegovina) Vahid Halilhodžić (Aug 16, 2010 – May 24, 2011)
- (Croatia) Marijo Tot (2011)
- (Croatia) Krunoslav Jurčić (May 26, 2011 – Dec 7, 2011)
- (Croatia) Ante Čačić (Dec 23, 2011 – Nov 26, 2012)
- (Croatia) Krunoslav Jurčić (Nov 26, 2012 – Aug 22, 2013)
- (Croatia) Damir Krznar (interim) (2013)
- (Croatia) Branko Ivanković (Sept 2, 2013 – Oct 22, 2013)
- (Croatia) Zoran Mamić (Oct 22, 2013 – Jul 1, 2016)
- (Croatia) Zlatko Kranjčar (Jul 1, 2016 – Sept 24, 2016)
- (Croatia) Željko Sopić (interim) (Sept 25, 2016 – Sept 28, 2016)
- (Bulgaria) Ivaylo Petev (Sept 29, 2016 – Jul 13, 2017)
- (Croatia) Mario Cvitanović (Jul 13, 2017 – Mar 10, 2018)
- (Croatia) Nikola Jurčević (Mar 12, 2018 – May 15, 2018)
- (Croatia) Nenad Bjelica (May 15, 2018 – Apr 16, 2020)
- (Croatia) Igor Jovićević (Apr 22, 2020 – Jul 6, 2020)
- (Croatia) Zoran Mamić (Jul 7, 2020 – Mar 15, 2021)
- (Croatia) Damir Krznar (Mar 15, 2021 – Dec 1, 2021)
- (Croatia) Željko Kopić (Dec 2, 2021 – Apr 21, 2022)
- (Croatia) Ante Čačić (Apr 21, 2022 – Apr 6, 2023)
- (Croatia) Igor Bišćan (Apr 6, 2023 – Aug 21 2023)
- (Bosnia and Herzegovina) Sergej Jakirović (Aug 21, 2023 – Sept 19, 2024)
- (Croatia) Sandro Perković (interim) (Sept 19, 2024 – Sept 26, 2024)
- (Croatia) Nenad Bjelica (Sept 26, 2024 – Dec 29, 2024)
- (Italy) Fabio Cannavaro (Dec 29, 2024 - Apr 9, 2025)
- (Croatia) Sandro Perković (interim) (Apr 9, 2025 – Jun 6, 2025)
- (Croatia) Mario Kovačević (Jun 6, 2025 – Nov 1, 2026)
- (Croatia) Jerko Leko (Nov 1, 2026 – present)

== Honours ==
The following table lists managers according to trophies won. In seasons when several managers had spells with the club only the manager who was in charge when the title was won is listed. The most successful manager to date was Miroslav Blažević who had four spells with the club (1980–83, 1986–88, 1992–94, 2002–03) and is the only manager to have won all the domestic honours available to Dinamo in both the Yugoslav and Croatian football league systems, leading Dinamo to a total of 6 trophies.

Ivica Horvat is the only manager who won European silverware with Dinamo, leading them to triumph in the 1967 Inter-Cities Fairs Cup Final, although he was in charge only for the final tie against Leeds United as Branko Zebec, who was in charge throughout the 1966–67 season, had left the club in the summer of 1967. Dinamo's only other European final came five years earlier in the 1962–63 Inter-Cities Fairs Cup, when they were led by Milan Antolković.

Zoran Mamić is the only manager to date to have won three consecutive national titles with Dinamo, winning the 2013–14, 2014–15 and 2015–16 a Croatian championships and the only coach who won the league title without a single defeat (in season 2014 -15).

=== Key ===
- CL = Croatian First League
- CC = Croatian Cup
- CS = Croatian Supercup
- YL = Yugoslav First League (defunct since 1991)
- YC = Yugoslav Cup (defunct since 1991)
- ICFC = Inter-Cities Fairs Cup (defunct since 1971)

=== Winning managers ===
Manager	Tenure(s)	Trophies						Total
Manager	Tenure(s)	Domestic					Int.	Total
Manager	Tenure(s)	YL	YC	CL	CC	CS	Int.	Total
(Austria) Karl Mütsch	1948	1	–	N/A			–	1
(Socialist Federal Republic of Yugoslavia) Bernard Hügl	1949–52	–	1	N/A			–	1
(Socialist Federal Republic of Yugoslavia) Ivan Jazbinšek	1953–55	1	–	N/A			–	1
(Socialist Federal Republic of Yugoslavia) Gustav Lechner	1957–58	1	–	N/A			–	1
(Socialist Federal Republic of Yugoslavia) Milan Antolković	1952–53, 1957, 1959–60, 1961–64	–	2	N/A			–	2
(Socialist Federal Republic of Yugoslavia) Vlatko Konjevod	1964–65	–	1	N/A			–	1
(Socialist Federal Republic of Yugoslavia) Ivica Horvat	1967–70	–	1	N/A			1	2
(Croatia) Vlatko Marković	1978–80, 1983, 1990–91, 1992	–	1	–	–	–	–	1
(Croatia) Miroslav Blažević	1980–83, 1986–88, 1992–94, 2002–03	1	1	2	1	1	–	6
(Croatia) Zlatko Kranjčar	1994–96, 1998	N/A		2	2	–	–	4
(Croatia) Otto Barić	1996–97	N/A		1	1	–	–	2
(Croatia) Ilija Lončarević	1999, 2001–02, 2005	N/A		1	1	–	–	2
(Croatia) Marijan Vlak	1997–98, 1999–2000, 2002, 2008–09	N/A		1	1	–	–	2
(Croatia) Nikola Jurčević	2003–04, 2018	N/A		1	1	1	–	2
(Croatia) Josip Kuže	1989–90, 2005–06	N/A		1	–	1	–	2
(Croatia) Branko Ivanković	2006–08, 2008, 2013	N/A		1	1	–	–	2
(Croatia) Zvonimir Soldo	2008	N/A		1	1	–	–	2
(Croatia) Krunoslav Jurčić	2009–10, 2011, 2012–13	N/A		3	1	1	–	5
(Croatia) Velimir Zajec	1998–99, 2010	N/A		–	–	1	–	1
(Bosnia and Herzegovina) Vahid Halilhodžić	2010–11	N/A		1	–	–	–	1
(Croatia) Marijo Tot	2011	N/A		–	1	–	–	1
(Croatia) Ante Čačić	2011–12, 2022–23,	N/A		2	1	1	–	4
(Croatia) Zoran Mamić	2013–16, 2020–21	N/A		3	2	–	–	5
(Croatia) Nenad Bjelica	2018–20	N/A		1	1	1	–	3
(Croatia) Igor Jovićević	2020	N/A		1	-	-	–	1
(Croatia) Damir Krznar	2021	N/A		1	1	-	–	2
(Croatia) Igor Bišćan	2023	N/A		1	-	1	-	2
(Bosnia and Herzegovina) Sergej Jakirović	2023–24	N/A		1	1	-	-	2
Total	1945–2024	4	7	25	17	8	1	62
