= Mladen Matković =

Croatian footballer

Personal information
- Full name: Mladen Matković
- Date of birth: 12 May 1989 (age 37)
- Place of birth: Vinkovci, SR Croatia, SFR Yugoslavia
- Height: 1.87 m (6 ft 1 1/2 in)
- Position: Goalkeeper

Team information
- Current team: Radnički Dalj

Youth career
- 1998–2004: Slavonac Komletinci
- 2004–2005: NK Otok
- 2005–2006: Cibalia
- 2006: NK Otok
- 2006–2008: Cibalia

Senior career*
Years	Team	Apps	(Gls)
2008–2013	Cibalia	79	(0)
2009	→ Otok		
2009–2010	→ Vukovar '91 (loan)		
2013–2015	Zadar	60	(0)
2015–2018	Cibalia	68	(0)
2018–2021	Inter Zaprešić	39	(0)
2022-	Radnički Dalj		
- * Club domestic league appearances and goals as of 16:05, 4 July 2021 (UTC)

Mladen Matković (born 12 May 1989 in Vinkovci) is a Croatian footballer who plays as a goalkeeper for Radnički Dalj.

== Club career ==
Matković started out his football career at NK Slavonac from his home village of Komletinci. At the age of 15 he moved on to the nearby NK Otok before joining the nearby Prva HNL team HNK Cibalia's academy, where he would remain for the rest of his academy years, apart from a short stint back at NK Otok.

Due to competition from Davor Burcsa and Marijan Antolović, Cibalia sent Matković out on two loans, one to NK Otok and one to second-tier Vukovar '91 before he was offered a professional contract and, following the departure of aforementioned players, made the team's first-choice goalkeeper. For the following three seasons he remained Cibalia's first-choice goalkeeper, amassing 96 appearances in all official competitions, but left the club following its relegation to Druga HNL in the summer of 2013, joining NK Zadar. Following two seasons at NK Zadar, the club was relegated as well, and he rejoined HNK Cibalia, with which he achieved promotion back to Prva HNL at the end of the 2015/16 season.
