= Željko Jovanović =

Željko Jovanović may refer to:

- Željko Jovanović (politician) (born 1965), Croatian politician and physician
- Željko Jovanović (photographer) (born 1961), Serbian newspaper and art photographer
