= Vrpolje, Brod-Posavina County =

Vrpolje
- Municipality
- Interactive map of Vrpolje
- Location of Vrpolje in Croatia
- Coordinates: 45°13′N 18°25′E
- Country: Croatia
- County: Brod-Posavina County

Government
  - Mayor: Ankica Zmaić (HDZ)

Area
  - Municipality: 60.9 km^{2} (23.5 sq mi)
  - Urban: 21.8 km^{2} (8.4 sq mi)

Population (2021)
  - Municipality: 2,818
  - Density: 46.3/km^{2} (120/sq mi)
  - Urban: 1,396
  - Urban density: 64.0/km^{2} (166/sq mi)
- Website: vrpolje.hr

Vrpolje (pronounced [ʋr̩̂po̞ʎe̞]) is a village and a municipality in Brod-Posavina County, Croatia. It is located 10 km south of Đakovo; elevation 90 m.

== Demographics ==
In 2021, the municipality had 2,818 residents in the following 3 settlements:

- Čajkovci, population 494
- Stari Perkovci, population 928
- Vrpolje, population 1,396
Vrpolje: Population trends 1857–2021
v

population	2681	2769	2481	3063	3070	3314	3101	3455	3687	3994	4357	4279	4089	3958	4023	3521	2818
	1857	1869	1880	1890	1900	1910	1921	1931	1948	1953	1961	1971	1981	1991	2001	2011	2021

Sources: Croatian Bureau of Statistics publications

== See also ==
- Strizivojna–Vrpolje railway station
