= First Croatian beach soccer league =

- Founded: 2021
- Country: Croatia
- Confederation: UEFA
- Number of clubs: 6
- International cup: Euro Winners Cup
- Most championships: Fusio (1 title)
- Website: Nogomet na pijesku

The First Croatian beach soccer league (Croatian: Prva hrvatska liga nogometa na pijesku), also known as Prva HLNP, is the top division in the Croatian Beach Soccer league. The league was inaugurated in 2021 under the supervision of the Croatian Football Federation and Beach Soccer Worldwide.

== Background ==
The executive board of the HNS, on 16 August 2021 passed a decision that the registered clubs in the beach soccer competition, play a pilot project of the first Croatian championship in beach soccer. Six clubs have been registered and matches played as series of three tournaments, with a single point system through six rounds in the period of August and September. Participating tams were KNP Beasal Gorovo (Opatija), KNP Pula (Pula), KNP Fusio (Zagreb), KNP Pješčana oluja (Zagreb), KNP Umag (Umag) and KNP Varadero (Zagreb). The first two tournaments were played at Stella Maris sport center in Umag on 14 and 21 August, while last tournament was played on Sand arena (Croatian: Pješčana arena) in Velika Gorica on 4 September.

== Champions ==
Season	Champion	Runner-up
2021	Fusio	Pula

== 2021 season ==
=== Group stage ===
Pos	Team	Pld	W	D	L	GF	GA	GD	Pts	Qualification or relegation
1	Fusio	5	4	0	1	37	17	+20	12	Championship match
2	Pula	5	4	0	1	25	18	+7	12	Championship match
3	Pješčana oluja	5	3	0	2	18	26	−8	9	Third place match
4	Umag	5	2	0	3	25	20	+5	6	Third place match
5	Beasal Gorovo	5	2	0	3	34	37	−3	6	Fifth place match
6	Varadero	5	0	0	5	10	31	−21	0	Fifth place match

Source: HNS (in Croatian)

Home \ Away	BEA	FUS	POL	PUL	UMG	VAR
Beasal Gorovo	—	—	7–9	—	—	12–3
Fusio	11–3	—	10–2	3–4	—	—
Pješčana oluja	—	—	—	3–0	1–9	3–0
Pula	9–5	—	—	—	6–3	—
Umag	5–7	5–6	—	—	—	—
Varadero	—	3–7	—	4–6	0–3	—

Source: HNS (in Croatian)
Legend: Blue = home team win; Yellow = draw; Red = away team win.

=== Classification matches ===
Championship match
Fusio	3:0 (w/o)	Pula
Third place match
Pješčana oluja	9:5	Umag
Fifth place match
Beasal Gorovo	10:6	Varadero

Source: HNS (in Croatian)

Final ranking
1st place, gold medalist(s)	Fusio
2nd place, silver medalist(s)	Pula
3rd place, bronze medalist(s)	Pješčana oluja
4	Umag
5	Beasal Gorovo
6	Varadero

Source: HNS, SportNews.hr Archived 19 June 2023 at the Wayback Machine (in Croatian)

== See also ==
- Euro Beach Soccer League
