= Čajkovci =

Village in Brod-Posavina County, Croatia

- Village
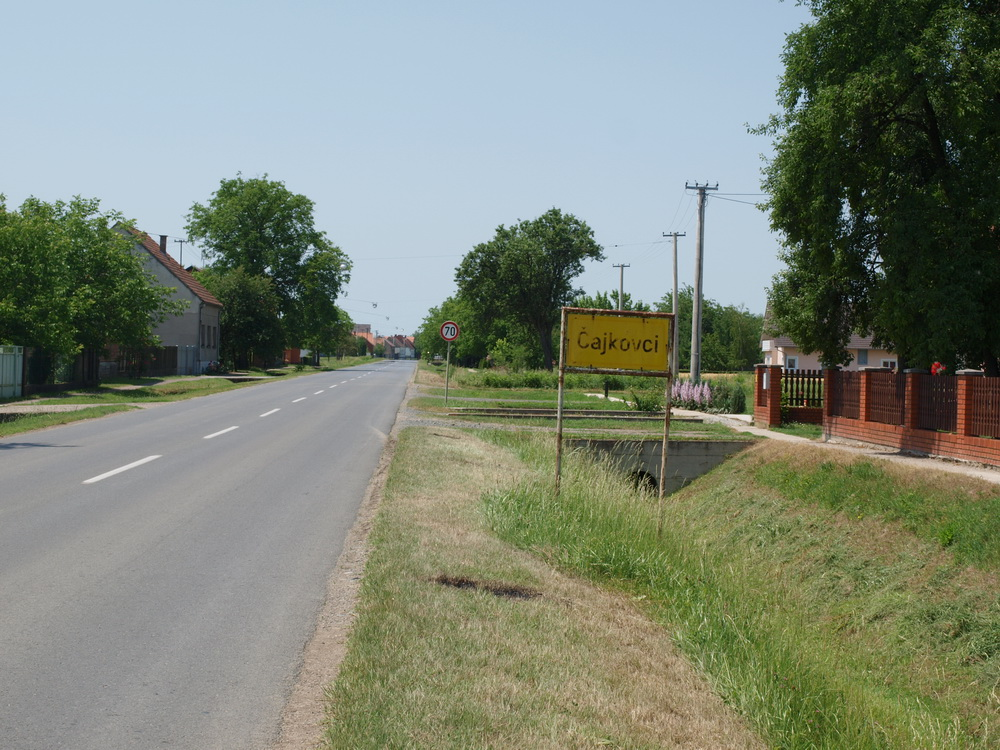
- Interactive map of Čajkovci
- Country: Croatia
- County: Brod-Posavina County

Population (2011)
  - Total: 639

Čajkovci is a village near Vrpolje, Brod-Posavina County, Croatia. In the 2011 census, it had 639 inhabitants.
