= Hrvoje Braović =

Croatian football manager

Personal information
- Full name: Hrvoje Braović
- Date of birth: 7 August 1956 (age 70)

Managerial career
- Years: Team
- 1998: Dinamo Zagreb
- 2000-2001: Dinamo Zagreb
- 2002: FK Lyn
- 2004-2005: Kamen Ingrad
- 2006-2007: Fehérvár (assistant)
- 2011: HAŠK
- 2012: Segesta

Hrvoje Braović (born 7 August 1956) is a Croatian football manager.

== Clubs ==
- GNK Dinamo Zagreb (1998, 2000–01)
- FC Lyn Oslo (2002)
- NK Kamen Ingrad (2004–05)
- Videoton FC, ''Assistant Coach'' (2006-07)
- HAŠK Zagreb (2011)
- Segesta Sisak (2012)
