= Željka =

Željka (Serbian: Жељка) is a feminine given name, the feminine form of Željko. Notable people with the name include:

- Željka Antunović (born 1955), Croatian centre-left politician
- Željka Čižmešija – Croatian retired figure skater
- Željka Nikolić (born 1991), Serbian handballer
- Željka Radanović (born 1989), Montenegrin footballer
