= Željko Bajčeta =

Montenegrin footballer (born 1963)

Personal information
- Full name: Željko Bajčeta
- Date of birth: 20 April 1963 (age 63)
- Place of birth: Nikšić, SFR Yugoslavia
- Height: 1.84 m (6 ft 0 in)
- Position: Forward

Youth career
- –1980: Sutjeska Nikšić

Senior career*
Years	Team	Apps	(Gls)
1980–1988	Sutjeska Nikšić	124	(42)
1988–1989	Spartak Subotica	7	(0)
1990	Sutjeska Nikšić	6	(1)
1991–1992	Olympiakos Nicosia		
1992–1993	AEL Limassol	21	(7)
1993	APEP FC	16	(4)
1994	LG Cheetahs	8	(3)
- * Club domestic league appearances and goals as of 15 January 2014

Željko Bajčeta (born 20 April 1963) is a retired Montenegrin footballer who played as a forward.

== Club career ==
He mainly played for clubs in Cyprus and Yugoslavia. He also played for FC Seoul of the South Korean K League, then known as the LG Cheetahs.
