= Željko Bujas =

Croatian linguist, Anglicist, Americanist and lexicographer (1928–1999)

Željko Bujas (16 February 1928 – 16 March 1999) was a Croatian linguist, Anglicist, Americanist and lexicographer.

He was born in Pag. In 1952 he received a degree in English language and literature, and Russian. In 1954 he became assistant in the English language at Department of English studies at the Faculty of Philosophy in Zagreb. He received his doctorate in 1965 with a thesis on machine translation from English into Croatian. Since 1974 he worked as a full professor. He became a corresponding member of the Yugoslav Academy of Sciences and Arts in 1977, an associate member in 1988, and a full member of the Academy in 1990.

Bujas was the first in Croatia to create computer concordances of Croatian writers (Gundulić's Osman, Istarski razvod in collaboration with others, the works of Marko Marulić etc.). He amended, updated and edited Milan Drvodelić's Englesko-hrvatsko-srpski rječnik ("English-Serbian-Croatian dictionary"; 1962^{2}-1981^{6}) and reworked his Hrvatsko ili srpsko-engleski rječnik ("Serbo-Croatian-English dictionary"; 1978^{4}-1996^{7}). He participated in other lexicographic projects as well. His Hrvatsko ili srpsko-engleski enciklopedijski rječnik ("Serbo-Croatian-English Encyclopedic Dictionary"; I. A-Lj, 1983; II. M-O, 1989) remained unfinished. His Veliki englesko-hrvatski rječnik ("Large English-Croatian dictionary") and Veliki hrvatsko-engleski rječnik ("Large Croatian-English dictionary"; 1999) were published posthumously.

As a linguist, Bujas was involved in contrastive analysis of English and Croatian, the differences between American English in relation to the British (especially in the lexicon), as well as the study of American English in the context of American culture and everyday life. At the University of Zagreb he organized a Ph.D. program in American studies. He served as a representative in the Croatian Parliament (since 1995) and as the first Croatian ambassador to Great Britain (1993-1995).

He died in Zagreb.
