= Željko Župetić =

Croatian footballer

Personal information
- Date of birth: 23 September 1967 (age 59)
- Place of birth: Zagreb, SR Croatia, SFR Yugoslavia
- Position: Midfielder

Senior career*
Years	Team	Apps	(Gls)
1986–1988	Radnik Velika Gorica		
1988–1996	Zagreb	170	(26)
1996–1997	Hapoel Haifa	28	(3)
1997	Hapoel Rishon LeZion	12	(0)
1998	Rijeka	10	(0)
2001	Trnje Zagreb	8	(1)
2002	Radnik Velika Gorica	18	(12)

International career^{‡}
1991	Croatia	1	(0)
- * Club domestic league appearances and goals as of 7 March 2014 ‡ National team caps and goals as of 7 March 2014

Željko Župetić (born 23 September 1967) is a retired Croatian football midfielder. During his professional career he mainly played for Zagreb in Croatia's Prva HNL. He also spent one and a half years in Israel.

== International career ==
Župetić also earned one cap for Croatia in June 1991 against Slovenia. The game was unofficial however, as Croatia was still part of Yugoslavia at the time.
