= Željko Pakasin =

Croatian footballer and manager

Personal information
- Date of birth: 8 June 1967 (age 59)
- Place of birth: Hlebine, Croatia
- Position: Midfielder

Youth career
- Slaven Belupo

Senior career*
Years	Team	Apps	(Gls)
1986–1992	Osijek	22+	(1+)
1992–1994	Croatia Zagreb	24	(8)
1994–1996	Sturm Graz	7	(1)
1996–1997	Hrvatski Dragovoljac	25	(7)
1997–1999	Slaven Belupo	26	(7)

Managerial career
- 2009: Lokomotiva Zagreb
- 2010: NK Maksimir
- * Club domestic league appearances and goals

Željko Pakasin (born 8 June 1967) is a retired Croatian football midfielder and manager.

== Career ==
Born in Hlebine near Koprivnica, Pakasin started his career at local side Slaven Belupo but made his mark with Osijek and later played for Dinamo Zagreb (called Croatia Zagreb at the time) and in Austria.
