= Željko Brestovački =

Serbian politician

Željko Brestovački (Serbian Cyrillic: Жељко Брестовачки; born 19 May 1967) is a politician in Serbia. He served in the National Assembly of Serbia from 2008 to 2012 as a member of the Democratic Party (Demokratska stranka, DS) and is now a member of the breakaway Social Democratic Party (Socijaldemokratska stranka, SDS).

== Early life and career ==
Brestovački was born in Erdevik, a village in the municipality of Šid, in what was then the Socialist Autonomous Province of Vojvodina in the Socialist Republic of Serbia, Socialist Federal Republic of Yugoslavia. He is a mechanic in private life and has served on the managing board of the agricultural enterprise Erdevik. Prior to his election to the National Assembly, he was co-ordinator of Vojvodina's capital investment fund in the Srem District.

== Political career ==
=== Democratic Party ===
Brestovački was included in the DS's electoral lists for the National Assembly of Serbia in the 2003 Serbian parliamentary election and the 2007 Serbian parliamentary election, though he was not selected for its assembly delegation on either occasion. (From 2000 to 2011, parliamentary mandates were awarded to sponsoring parties or coalitions rather than to individual candidates, and the mandates were often distributed out of numerical order. Brestovački's position on the list had no bearing on whether he received a mandate on either occasion.)

He received the eighteenth position on the DS's For a European Serbia coalition list in the 2008 Serbian parliamentary election. The list won 102 seats, and, this time, he was selected for a mandate. This election did not produce a clear winner; after extended negotiations, the For a European Serbia alliance formed a new coalition government with the Socialist Party of Serbia. Brestovački served as a supporter of the ministry. In October 2010, he was appointed to the assembly committee on local self-government.

Serbia's electoral system was reformed in 2011, such that parliamentary mandates were awarded in numerical order to candidates on successful lists. Stanimirović received the 140th position on the DS's Choice for a Better Life list in the 2012 parliamentary election; the list won sixty-seven mandates, and he was not re-elected.

Brestovački also served in the Šid municipal assembly and was the leader of the For a European Serbia group in this body while also serving in the National Assembly. In September 2011, during a debate on the official status of the Croatian in the municipality, he condemned a statement by a far-right Serbian Radical Party representative that was considered as hate speech against Croats. He served as president of the municipal assembly for a time until a new local coalition government was formed in September 2012.

=== Social Democratic Party ===
The Democratic Party experienced a serious split in early 2014, with Boris Tadić setting up a breakaway group initially called the New Democratic Party. This group contested the 2014 election in a fusion with the Greens of Serbia and in alliance with other parties. Brestovački sided with Tadić in the split and was given the sixty-fourth position on the alliance's electoral list. The list won eighteen mandates, and he was not returned. The New Democratic Party was reconstituted as the SDS later in the year, and Brestovački was elected as president of the party's Vojvodina executive committee in June 2015. He is also the president of the SDS's organization in Šid, and in September 2015 he became deputy mayor of the municipality when the party entered a new local coalition government.

For the 2016 parliamentary election, the SDS ran in an alliance with the Liberal Democratic Party and the League of Social Democrats of Vojvodina. Brestovački received the sixty-fourth position on their combined list and was again not returned when it won only thirteen seats. He also appeared in the third position on a combined SDS–Liberal Democratic Party list in the concurrent 2016 Vojvodina provincial election. The list did not cross the electoral threshold to win representation in the Assembly of Vojvodina.
