= Davor Burcsa =

Croatian footballer (born 1979)

Personal information
- Date of birth: 14 August 1979 (age 47)
- Place of birth: Osijek, SR Croatia, SFR Yugoslavia
- Height: 1.82 m (5 ft 11 1/2 in)
- Position: Goalkeeper

Youth career
- Osijek

Senior career*
Years	Team	Apps	(Gls)
2000–2005	Osijek	13	(0)
2000–2002	→ Zadar (loan)		
2005–2010	Cibalia	94	(0)
2010–2012	Pomorac	27	(0)
2012–2014	Bobota		
2014–2017	Vukovar 1991		
2017–2018	NK Radnički Mece		
- * Club domestic league appearances and goals as of 21:28, 29 October 2009 (UTC)

Davor Burcsa (born 14 August 1979) is a Croatian retired footballer who played as a goalkeeper.

== Club career ==
Born in Osijek, Burcsa is a product of NK Osijek's youth system, where he joined the club's senior squad in 2000, but he failed to become a first-team regular so was loaned to NK Zadar. In 2002, he returned to Osijek, but he played a total of 13 games before joining Osijek's Slavonian rivals HNK Cibalia on a free transfer in 2005.

In Cibalia, Burcsa immediately became their first-choice goalkeeper. In the following four Prva HNL seasons, Burcsa was the cornerstone of Cibalia's defense which conceded around 1.5 goals per game (201 goals in 131 games). In 2009, he became the substitute of Marijan Antolović. He later played for Third division side Vukovar 1991.
