= Željko Polak =

Bosnian-Herzegovinian footballer

Personal information
- Full name: Željko Polak
- Date of birth: 9 March 1976 (age 50)
- Place of birth: SFR Yugoslavia
- Height: 1.81 m (5 ft 11 1/2 in)
- Position: Forward

Senior career*
Years	Team	Apps	(Gls)
1989–1991	Mačva Šabac	23	(1)
- Rad
1998–1999	Milicionar		
1998–1999	→ Palilulac Beograd (loan)		
1999–2000	Radnički Beograd		
2000–2001	FC Carl Zeiss Jena	1	(0)
2001–2004	Radnički Beograd	70	(6)
2004–2006	Bežanija	52	(1)
2006–2009	Mladost Lučani	60	(2)
- * Club domestic league appearances and goals

Željko Polak (Serbian Cyrillic: Жељко Полак; born 9 March 1976) is a retired Bosnian-Herzegovinian footballer.

== Club career ==
After playing in Serbian clubs such as FK Mačva Šabac, FK Milicionar, FK Palilulac Beograd and FK Radnički Beograd, in 2000, he moved to Germany to play in FC Carl Zeiss Jena. After not getting many chances to play, he returned and played in Serbian SuperLiga and Serbian First League with Radnički Beograd, FK Bežanija and FK Mladost Lučani.
