= Željko Jovanović (photographer) =

Serbian photographer

- Born: 2 October 1961 (age 63); Šabac, Serbia, SFR Yugoslavia
- Education: Faculty of Economics in Belgrade (1987)
- Occupation(s): newspaper and art photographer
- Years active: 1977–present

Željko Jovanović (Šabac, 2 October 1961) is a notable Serbian newspaper and art photographer.

== Biography ==
He graduated from the Faculty of Economics in Belgrade in 1987.

Since 1977, he has published tens of thousands of photos and thousands of front pages in domestic and foreign newspapers and magazines, as well as in art, advertising, business and scientific publications. He has been awarded at international and domestic photographic exhibitions. Independently and collectively exhibited in Serbia and abroad.

As the leading photo reporter and photo editor of the Politika newspaper, for which he works since March 1990, he recorded the most diverse events – from wars and demonstrations to the highest state ceremonies, cultural and sports events. He is a member of "The Applied Artists and Designers Association of Serbia" (ULUPUDS), the "Association of Photographers of Serbia" (UFOS) and the "Serbian Photographic Society" (1946–2011: Photo Association of Yugoslavia). He devotes special attention to photographing portraits and recording cultural life, artistic creativity and cultural and historical heritage. He has recorded many cultural events: Vukov sabor, Belgrade International Theatre Festival (BITEF), Belgrade Music Festival (BEMUS), BELEF, Belgrade Jazz Festival, Festival of dance, Film Encounters, Belgrade Book Fair and other events in Serbia and abroad. He collaborated on theater, film and television projects with most famous authors of Serbia.

Theatre photography by Željko Jovanović

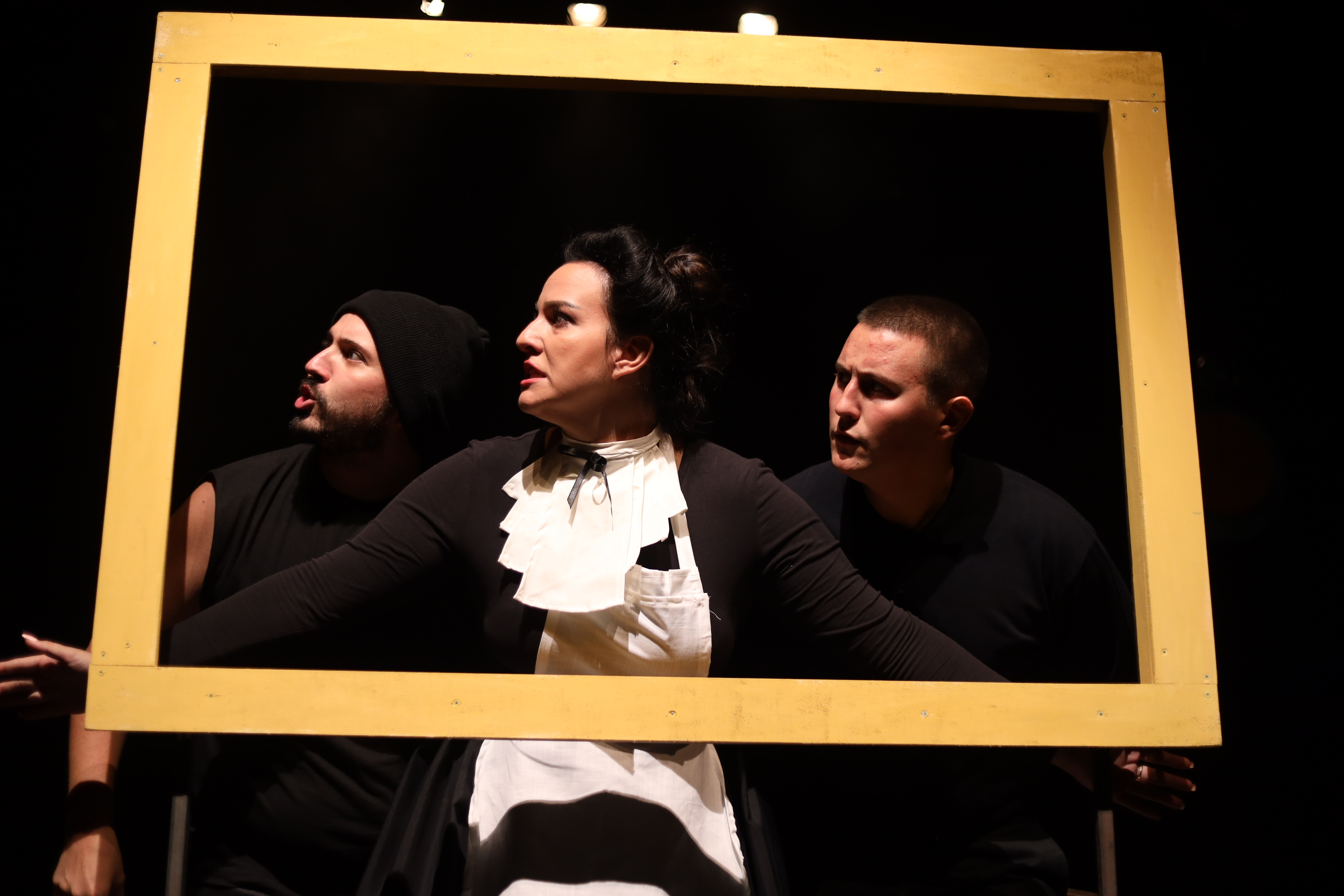
Theatre Duško Radović
2022

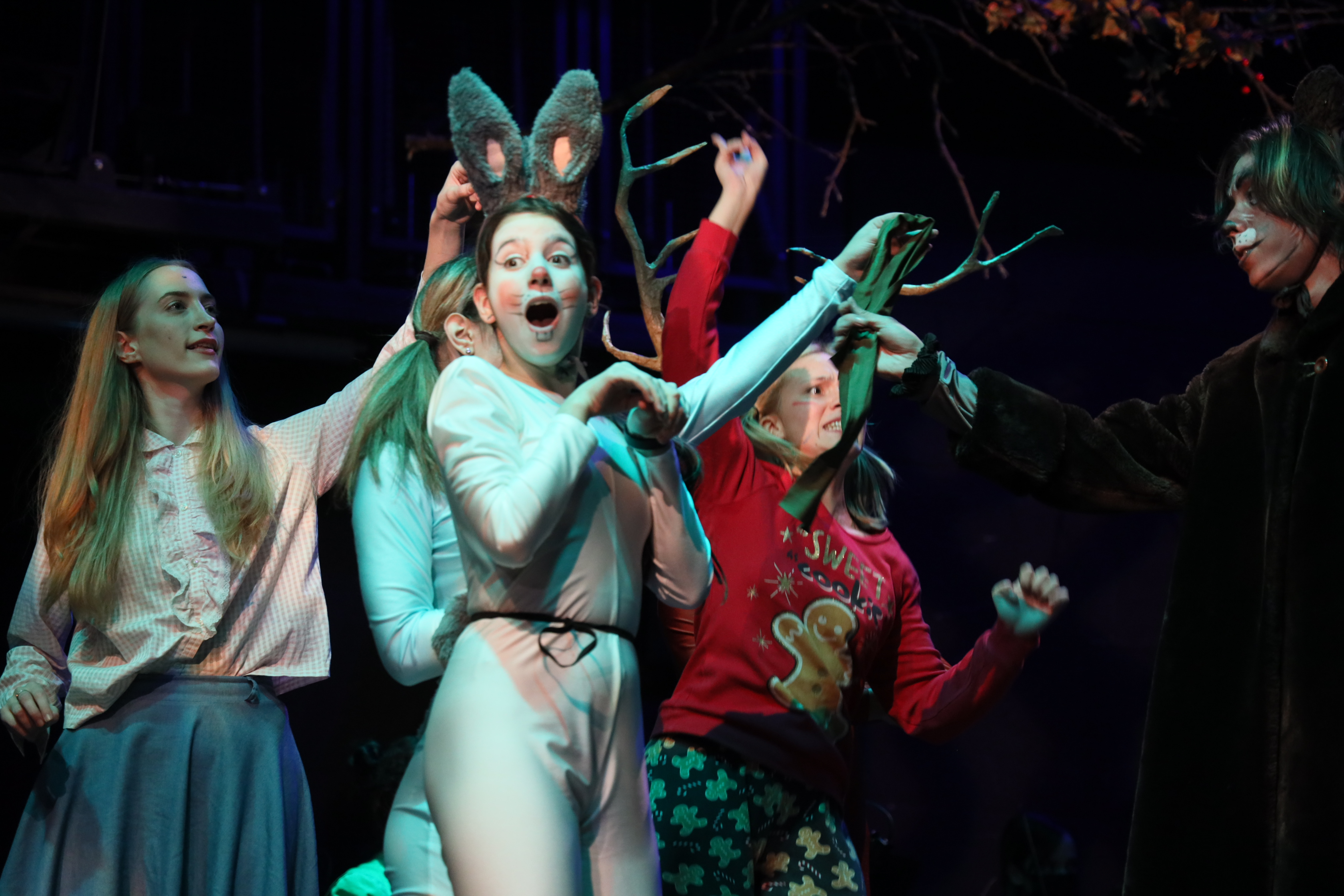
Theatre Duško Radović
2021

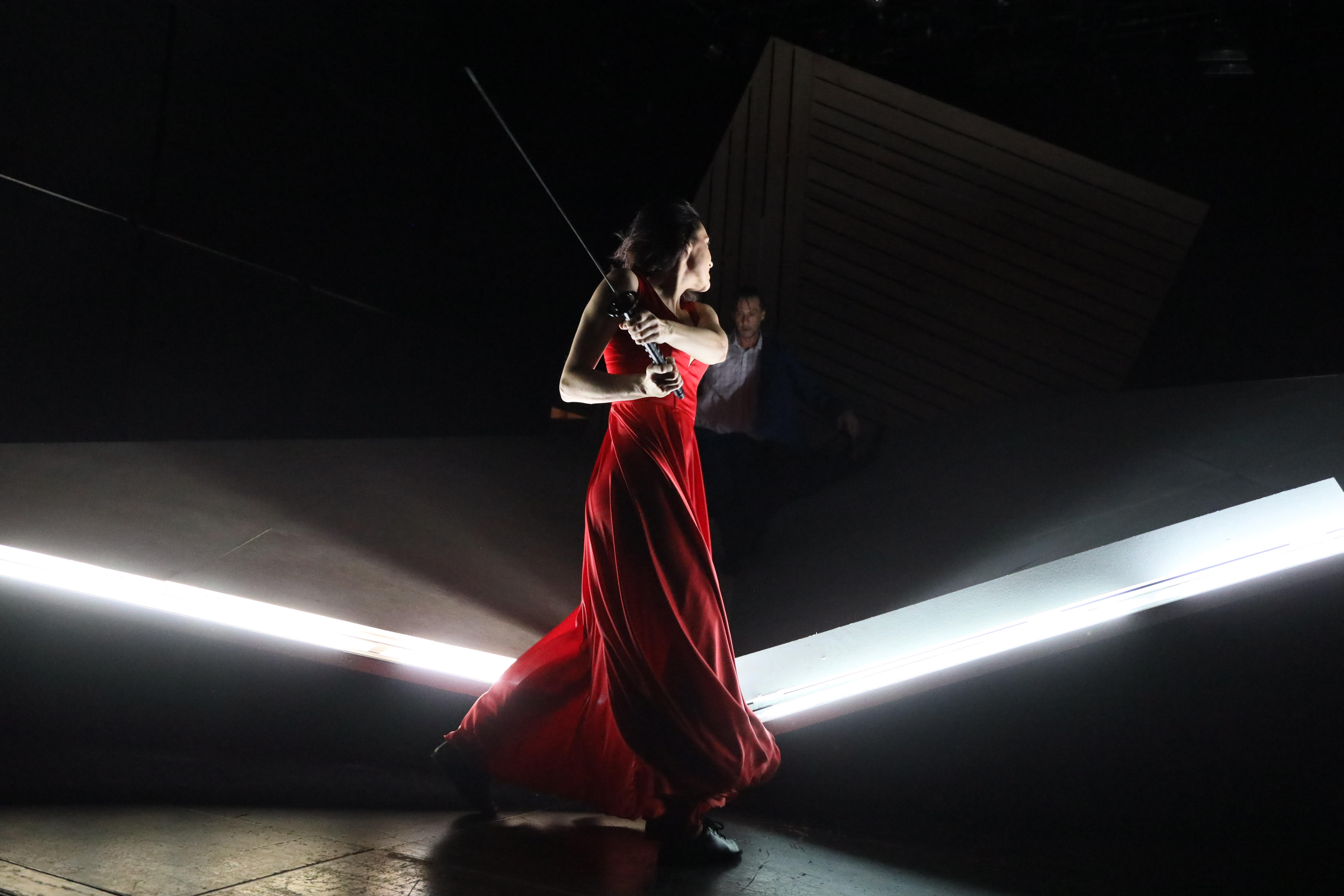
National Theatre Belgrade
2019

He photographed for the prestigious monographs of academician Vladimir Veličković, Mića Popović, Vera Božičković Popović and other fine artists. He is the author of a photo for the monographs of the Faculty of Dentistry in Belgrade, the City Institute for Health Protection of Belgrade, the City of Loznica, corporate profiles, promotional and political campaigns, publications ...

He is also the author of photos for the campaign "Let's preserve the Serbian Language", which, through posters, photographs, videos and other means develops language culture in Serbia and the Republic of Srpska, as well as "Naše Blago" that represents the cultural heritage of Belgrade.
