= Željko Janjetović =

Bosnian diplomat

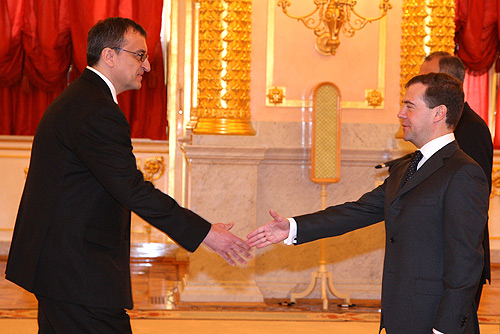
Janjetović presents his credentials to Dmitry Medvedev in February 2009.

Željko Janjetović is a Bosnian diplomat and the Ambassador Extraordinary and Plenipotentiary of Bosnia and Herzegovina to Germany. Previous to his posting to Berlin, Janjetović was the Bosnian Ambassador to India, Russia and Hungary. In his diplomatic career except the previously mentioned residential posts, he also covered non-residential following countries: Sri Lanka, Bangladesh, Nepal, Armenia, Belarus, Kazakhstan, Kyrgyzstan, Uzbekistan. In the period between 2005–2008, Janjetovic worked in a multinational company "Global Ispat-London Mumbai" as the executive director of business development for southeastern Europe.
