= Željko Božić =

Serbian actor and stuntman

- Born: September 29, 1974; Belgrade, Serbia, Yugoslavia
- Died: June 7, 2006 (aged 31); Belgrade, Serbia
- Occupation(s): Stuntman, Actor
- Spouse: Milkica Bozic (1999-2006)

Željko Božić (born September 29, 1974 in Belgrade, Serbia; died June 7, 2006) was a Serbian stuntman and actor.

Božić became internationally famous after winning stunt awards in Moscow and Belgrade, and as the founder of the Koloseum stunt awards open source stunt project. His film career has been long both in his home country and elsewhere.

His film work includes The Peacemaker (1997), Welcome to Sarajevo (1997), Gypsy Magic (1997), The Professional (2001), All the Invisible Children (2005), We are not Angels 2 (2004), Fade to Black (2005) and Made in YU (2004).

His name is sometimes spelled Zeliko Bozich in film credits.

== Injured while performing dangerous stunt ==
On 27 April 2006, Božić was severely injured when he performed a unique and extremely dangerous car stunt. He jumped from a height of 50 feet from a bridge and into a river, staying inside the car during the fall. This stunt demonstration was a promotion for the Koloseum International Stunt Festival which was supposed to be held in September, 2006.

Božić died on June 7, 2006, leaving behind his wife Milkica Božić and their two children.

== Honors and awards ==
- World stunt academy member - since 2001
- International stunt academician - since 2005
- Professor on Dramatic arts Academy BK - since 1997
- President of stuntmen's association of Serbia and Montenegro since 1999
- Founder of Koloseum Stunt Awards - Open source stunt festival project
- Award for the best automobile stunt - Moscow 2005
- Awards for the Apsolute stunt championship (3 place) - Moscow 2003)
- Award for the best high fall - Belgrade 2005
