= Željko Milović =

Željko Milović (born 1968 in Bar, Montenegro, SFR Yugoslavia) writer, poet, journalist, publicist, music critic.

Since 1986 Milović has been publishing music reviews, articles and essays as well as a variety of texts related to issues of culture and subculture. For many years he has been an active member of the editorial board of the Omladinski Grafiti (Youth Graffiti), the cult Podgorica's magazine of the nineties. In recent years he's been writing about Montenegrin music and urban scene for the weekly magazine Monitor.

Since 1994 he's been working as a journalist, broadcast host and editor of music shows on Radio Bar. For seven years he has been editing the youth magazine The Road to South and a rock serial Billy Joe & Lollita in Wonderland for eight years. Milović is the author of several ethno-reportages. For a report of an ecological "black point" – Give Sea a Chance: Junkyard Ćafe, he was awarded first place and got a grand prix "Golden Microphone Awards" in 2010 at the Third Radio Festival of Montenegro. He was awarded third place in 1998 at the Radio Festival in Niksic for the report Countryside Zupci and second place in 2009 at the Radio Festival in Berane for the report Church of Saint Tekla.

Milović has been the chief editor of Barske novine (Bar newspapers) and bARS, a magazine dedicated to arts and culture, from 1999 until 2003. From 2007 until 2010 he has been the chief editor of Nove barske novine (New Bar newspaper). He's the editor of the Bar Info portal – Bar online daily. He's a member of the Association of Writers of Montenegro and Matica crnogorska.

With several other writers, in 1993 he founded the Association of writers Ars Antibari, whose members were poets and prose writers from Montenegro and Serbia, including rock musicians Margita Stefanović, Brane Babić Kebra, Nandor Ljubanović and Nikola Vranjković.

Milović's key author's work is the monograph "Montenegrin pop-rock music 1954-1991", on 620 pages, which includes 259 monographic units and 346 pictures.

He collaborated in editing a five-volume Istorijski leksikon Crne Gore (History lexicon of Montenegro).
He was awarded the literary prize Ćamil Sijarić for best unpublished book of prose in 2006/07 year.

In 2010 and 2011 he represented Montenegro at the Storytelling festival Prichigin in Split, Croatia. In 2010 and 2011 he represented Montenegrin poets at the Struga Poetry Evenings in Struga, Republic of Macedonia. He is also first Montenegrin poet at the international poetry festival Poetic nights in Velestovo, Macedonia, in 2011.

Milović is the first laureate of the annual Komun@ magazine award, which is awarded for the promotion and valorization of the cultural heritage of Montenegro (2016). In November 2023, he was presented with the highest municipal award in Bar - the November 24 Award for professional achievement in cultural creativity.

He is the main vocalist, songwriter and composer VIS BEŽ, with whom he published two CDs: Life in E minor (2023) and Sun, Earth and You (2024) and single Freedom (2025).

== Published works ==
- Bandiera rossa (poems) 1994.
- Ovu knjigu nisam nazvao imenom tvojim (I didn't entitle this book by your name) (poems) 1995.
- Periferni vremeplov (Peripheral timemachine) (poems/prose/photos) 1998.
- Bandiera Nera I (prose) 2000.
- Bandiera Nera II (poems) 2000.
- Ona i grad i grad i ja (She and the city and the city and me) (poems) 2001.
- Izdaleka mi zene na potonule katedrale lice (From afar women seem like sunk cathedrals to me) (selected poems on montenegrin) 2006. (project with photographer Stevo Popovic)
- Ti dani, te godine (Those days, those years) (prose) 2007.
- Ulica Ivice Surjaka i što je bilo poslije (Ivica Shurjak's Street and what happened after) (prose) 2011.
- Мртво море меѓу нас (Dead Sea between us) (selected poems on Macedonian) 2013.
- Povratak u Ulicu maršala Tita (Back to the Marshal Tito's Street) (prose) 2017.
- Koronartno odjeljenje, soba 80 (Coronarty ward, room 80) (poems) 2025.
- Čini se (da mozgovi crni pišu poeziju) (It Seems (That Black Brains Write Poetry)) (poems) 2025.
- Pseudologia Phantastica (poems) 2025.
- Bar(Bar)ski brevijar (Bar(Bar)ian Breviary) (poems) 2025.
- Murali nevidljivog (Murals of the Invisible) (poems) 2025.
- Pjesme o prozirnim ženama i ostalim vilinskim bićima (Poems about transparent women and other fairy creatures) (poems) 2025.

== Monographs about Bar ==
- Knjiga o Baru (A Book of Bar), 2001. – co-author and editor
- Pristan, priča o srušenom gradu (Pristan, the story of the broken city) 2008. – co-author and co-editor
- Bar s druge strane ogledala (Bar from the other side of the mirror) 2009. – author
- Mir, Mir, Mirovica, 30 godina (Mir, Mir, Mirovica, 30 years) 2016. – author
- Crnogorska pop-rok muzika 1954-1991 (Montenegrian pop-rock music 1954-1991) 2015. - author
- Barski ljetopis, prvih 30 godina (Barski ljetopis - First 30 Years) 2018. - co-author
- Četrdeset godina Radio Bara (Forty Years of Radio Bar) 2019. - editor and co-author
- Ljudi iz grada bez vrati - (ne)zaboravljeni Barani XX vijeka (People from the Town without a Gate - (Un)Forgotten residents of Bar from Twentieth Century) - 2 volumes - 2019 - author
- Najljepše su pjesme tebi ostale - prve četiri decenije barskog pop rocka (You get to keep the most beautiful songs - the first four decades of pop rock music from Bar), exhibition material - 2019 - author
- Žene iz grada bez vrati - (ne)zaboravljene Baranke XX vijeka (Women from the Town without a Gate - (Un)Forgotten residents of Bar from Twentieth Century) - 2023 - author
- Vijek sa djecom - 102 godine barskog vrtića (A century with children - 102 years of kindergarten in Bar), 2023 - author
- Štampani mediji u Baru (Print media in Bar (1886 – 1972 – 2023) – origin, development and analysis of relations with the local community), 2023 - author
- Mornarovih 100 godina (FC Mornar's 100 Years) - 2024. author

Also, as a "ghost writer", he is the author of two monographs about Bar's history.
