= Marijan Zovko =

Croatian footballer (born 1959)

Personal information
- Date of birth: 21 August 1959 (age 67)
- Place of birth: Žepče, FPR Yugoslavia
- Height: 1.90 m (6 ft 3 in)
- Position: Central defender

Senior career*
Years	Team	Apps	(Gls)
1977–1979	Hajduk Split	13	(2)
1977	→ BSK Slav. Brod (loan)	17	(0)
1980–1988	Vojvodina	196	(30)
1988–1991	Lierse	63	(9)
1992–1994	Marsonia		

International career
1978	Yugoslavia U21	1	(0)

Managerial career
- 2000: Marsonia
- 2001–2002: Žepče
- 2002–2003: Posušje
- 2005–2006: Slavonac CO
- 2009–2011: MV Croatia Sl.Brod
- 2013–2018: Marsonia
Medal record
Representing Yugoslavia
Gold medal – first place	UEFA U-21 Euro	1978
- * Club domestic league appearances and goals

Marijan Zovko (born 21 August 1959) is a Croatian former football player and manager.

== Playing career ==
Born in Žepče, Zovko started his senior career playing in his hometown Yugoslav First League club Hajduk Split where he won the 1978–79 national Championship. In 1980, he moved to another top league club, Vojvodina where he played most of his career, becoming the team captain and, there too, winning the national title, in the 1988–89 season. In nine years there, between official and other, he played 461 matches, scoring 132 goals, as a defender.

In October 1988 (1988–1989 season) he decided to move abroad, joining to Belgian First Division club Lierse where he stayed until 1991. He made 63 appearances there scoring 9 goals.

He played for Yugoslavia under-21 national team.

== Managerial career ==
After finishing his playing career, Zovko became a football manager, coaching many clubs mainly in the Croatian and Bosnian top leagues. His first job was at Marsonia, where he replaced Stjepan Deverić in August 2000.

He was named manager of Marsonia again in February 2012, succeeding Miroslav Buljan.

== Honours ==
Hajduk Split

- Yugoslav First League: 1978–79

Vojvodina

- Yugoslav First League: 1988–89
