= Željko Marasović =

American classical composer

Željko Marasović (3 November 1951, Zagreb (Croatia) – 3 August 2021, Los Angeles) was a Croatian American pianist, organist and composer of classical and film music.

== Biography ==
Marasović studied piano with Ivo Maček, organ with Vlasta Hranilović and Žarko Dropulić and composition at the Zagreb Academy of Music, where he took degrees in 1974. Later he studied at Santa Cecilia Conservatory in Rome. He received a master's degree in music from the USC Thornton School of Music in Los Angeles.

Marasović is considered as one of the most prominent organists of his generation in Croatia, together with Anđelko Klobučar and Hvalimira Bledšnajder, performing also as organist of Zagreb Philharmonic. Together with Anđelko Klobučar, he is one of just few Croatian organists who performed at organs of Notre-Dame in Paris.

He made numerous recordings for label Jugoton between 1974 and 1985, when he moved to Los Angeles.

=== Filmography ===
- 1984 : Ellis Island, les portes de l'espoir ("Ellis Island") (feuilleton TV)
- 1987 : Testimony
- 1992 : The Real West
- 1993 : Civil War Journal
- 1994 : Ancient Prophecies (TV)
- 1994 : Titanic: The Legend Lives On (TV)
- 1994 : The American Revolution (TV)
- 1995 : The Last Days of World War II (TV)
- 1996 : Ancient Mysteries (série TV)
- 1996 : Mummies: Tales from the Egyptian Crypts (TV)
- 1997 : The St. Valentine's Day Massacre (TV)
- 1998 : Hidden Treasures (série TV)
- 1998 : The Big House (série TV)
- 1998 : The Irish in America: Long Journey Home (feuilleton TV)
- 1999 : Civil War Combat: America's Bloodiest Battles (TV)
- 2000 : Civil War Combat: The Bloody Lane at Antietam (TV)
- 2002 : Modern Marvels (TV)
- 2002 : Train Wrecks (TV)
- 2007 : *ORANGELOVE
- 2007 : *Spiritual Warriors, co-written and co-produced by Jsu Garcia
- 2009 : Pavle the Boy
- 2009 : Blossom
- 2009 : The Show Must Go On
