= Željko Kljajević =

Serbian-born Montenegrin footballer

Personal information
- Full name: Željko Kljajević
- Date of birth: 14 September 1984 (age 42)
- Place of birth: Belgrade, SFR Yugoslavia
- Height: 1.85 m (6 ft 1 in)
- Position: Central defender

Youth career
- Jedinstvo Bijelo Polje
- Red Star Belgrade

Senior career*
Years	Team	Apps	(Gls)
2003–2004	Rad		
2004	Zvezdara		
2005	ŁKS Łódź	10	(0)
2005–2007	Obilić	2+	(0+)
2007	Mogren	0	(0)
2008	Modriča	14	(0)
2008–2010	Maribor	16	(0)
2010	Aalesunds	0	(0)
- * Club domestic league appearances and goals

Željko Kljajević (Serbian Cyrillic: Жељко Кљајевић; born 14 September 1984) is a Serbian-born Montenegrin former professional footballer who played as a defender.

== Club career ==
After playing in the youth squads of Jedinstvo Bijelo Polje and Red Star Belgrade, he represented several clubs from Serbia, namely Rad, Zvezdara and Obilić, Polish club ŁKS Łódź, Montenegrin side Mogren, Modriča in Bosnia and Herzegovina, and Maribor in Slovenia.

== Honours ==
Modriča

- Premier League of Bosnia and Herzegovina: 2007–08

NK Maribor

- Slovenian PrvaLiga: 2008–09
