= Ilija Lončarević =

Croatian football manager and player

Personal information
- Full name: Ilija Lončarević
- Date of birth: 8 October 1944 (age 82)
- Place of birth: Čajkovci, Independent State of Croatia

Senior career*
Years	Team	Apps	(Gls)
1963–1964	Lokomotiva		
1967–1969	NK Prvomajska		

Managerial career
- 1971: NK Prvomajska
- 1987–1988: NK Zagreb
- 1990–1993: Inker Zaprešić
- 1994: Marsonia
- 1994–1995: NK Zagreb
- 1995–1996: Slaven Belupo
- 1997: Orijent
- 1997–1998: Hrvatski Dragovoljac
- 1999: Croatia Zagreb
- 2000: Marsonia
- 2000–2001: Čakovec
- 2001–2002: Dinamo Zagreb
- 2003–2004: Libya
- 2004–2005: Dinamo Zagreb
- 2005–2006: Libya
- 2006–2008: Osijek
- 2009: Lokomotiva
- 2009: KF Tirana
- 2010–2012: Inter Zaprešić
- 2013–2014: Gorica
- 2014–2015: Croatia (youth)
- 2015–2016: Marsonia
- 2018: HAŠK
- 2019–2020: HAŠK
- 2021: Inter Zaprešić
- 2022: Kustošija
- * Club domestic league appearances and goals

Ilija Lončarević (born 8 October 1944) is a Croatian professional football manager and former player who was most recently the manager of Croatian Second Football League club Kustošija.

== Managerial career ==
Lončarević led Inker Zaprešić to the Croatian Cup title in 1992, but his arguably biggest success in management came when he won the Croatian League with Croatia Zagreb in 1999. In the 1990s, Lončarević was also in charge of several other Croatian teams including NK Zagreb, Marsonia, Slaven Belupo and Hrvatski Dragovoljac.

In the summer of 2000, after a short spell with Marsonia, Lončarević was appointed head coach at Čakovec, who just won their first promotion to the Croatian first division at the time, and led the club through the first part of the 2000–01 season. Under his management, Čakovec surprisingly came in position to fight for the fifth place in the Croatian league for some time during the autumn of 2000; they finished the season in 8th place. Lončarević left Čakovec in the winter break of the 2000–01 season and returned to Dinamo Zagreb for the 2001–02 season.

In 2003, Lončarević was appointed head coach of the Libya national football team and led the team through their qualifying campaign for the 2006 World Cup. He was surprisingly sacked from the post in July 2004, although the team only lost one qualifying match until that time. After this first spell with the Libya national team, Lončarević went on to take charge of Dinamo Zagreb in November 2004 and stayed there until the end of the season. In April 2005, however, Lončarević was appointed head coach of the Libya national team for a second time, after their previous coach, Mohamed El Khemisy, resigned from the post following a 4–1 defeat to Egypt in the World Cup qualifiers.

Lončarević then led the Libyan team through their remaining four World Cup qualifiers, but did not have much of success as the team managed two goalless draws and suffered two 1–0 defeats. Libya finished fourth in their group, 10 points behind the group winners Ivory Coast. Despite the unsuccessful World Cup qualifying campaign, Lončarević remained in charge of the Libyan team for the 2006 African Cup of Nations. However, after Libya lost to Egypt and Ivory Coast in their first two group matches at the tournament, chairman of the Libyan Football Federation, Gamal Al Gaafari, announced that the coach will be relieved of his duties after the last group match against Morocco, which ended in a goalless draw.

Since November 2006, Lončarević had been in charge of Croatian first division team Osijek. The team finished sixth in the league during his first season there and in May 2007 he signed a contract to end with the finish of the 2008–09. In his second season with Osijek, in 2007–08, the team finished third in the league and qualified for the 2008 UEFA Intertoto Cup.

In summer 2009 Lončarević was put on charge of KF Tirana champions of Albanian Superliga. However, on 6 October 2009, barely 5 weeks after the start of the Albanian Superliga, Lončarević gave his resignations without citing any reasons why he did that.

On 8 March 2021, he was appointed head coach again at Inter Zaprešić, today a Croatian second division team. He resigned at Kustošija in October 2022.

== Managerial statistics ==
As of 3 December 2017

Team	From	To	Record				
Team	From	To	G	W	D	L	Win %
NK Zagreb	1987	1988					
Inker Zaprešić	July 1990	November 1992	82	40	21	21	48.78
Marsonia	1994	1994					
NK Zagreb	July 1994	November 1995	47	19	19	9	40.43
Slaven Belupo	1995	1996					
Orijent 1919	March 1997	June 1997	13	3	4	6	23.08
Hrvatski Dragovoljac	July 1997	November 1998	49	19	14	16	38.78
Croatia Zagreb	April 1999	June 1999	8	4	3	1	50.00
Marsonia	2000	2000					
Čakovec	July 2000	December 2000	20	6	7	7	30.00
Dinamo Zagreb	April 2001	April 2002	50	31	8	11	62.00
Libya	September 2003	May 2004	10	6	4	0	60.00
Dinamo Zagreb	November 2004	March 2005	11	4	2	5	36.36
Libya	May 2005	Jan 2006	13	1	4	8	7.69
Osijek	November 2006	September 2008	62	27	12	23	43.55
Lokomotiva	January 2009	March 2009					
KF Tirana	June 2009	October 2009	1	1	0	0	100.00
Inter Zaprešić	April 2010	April 2012	66	25	11	30	37.88
Gorica	April 2013	November 2014					
Inter Zaprešić	March 2021	Present					

== Honours ==
Inter Zaprešić

- Croatian Cup: 1992

Marsonia

- Druga HNL – North: 1993–94
- Druga HNL: 1999–2000

Slaven Belupo

- Druga HNL – North: 1995–96

Dinamo Zagreb

- Prva HNL: 1998–99
- Croatian Cup: 2001

Tirana

- Albanian Super Cup: 2009
