= Željko Ačkar =

Croatian footballer

Personal information
- Date of birth: 9 June 1969 (age 57)
- Place of birth: Croatia
- Position: Midfielder

Senior career*
| Years | Team | Apps | (Gls) |
| 1992 | Cibalia | 14 | (0) |
| 1992–1993 | Radnik Velika Gorica | 8 | (1) |
| 1993 | Dubrava | 13 | (0) |
| 1993–1994 | Zadar | 8 | (0) |
| 1994–1995 | Neretva | 20 | (1) |
| 1995–1996 | Šibenik | 28 | (4) |
| 2003–2004 | Marsonia | 15 | (1) |
| 2004–2005 | Međimurje | 13 | (0) |
- * Club domestic league appearances and goals

Željko Ačkar (born 21 February 1969) is a retired Croatian football midfielder.
