= NK TŠK Topolovac =

Croatian football club

TŠK Topolovac
- Full name: Topolovački športski klub
- Founded: 1932
- Ground: Park Grofova, Topolovac
- Capacity: 1,500
- League: First League of Sisačko-Moslavačka County
Home colours	Away colours

NK TŠK Topolovac is a Croatian association football club based in the village of Topolovac near the city of Sisak. They are currently members of the First Sisak-Moslavina County League, a 6th level division, and play their home matches at the Park Grofova stadium which has a capacity of 1,500.

Founded in 1932, the club spent its entire existence in relative obscurity playing in various county leagues. Their only success to date was qualifying for 2001–02 Prva HNL (Croatian top level) after finishing fifth in the 2000–01 Druga HNL. In what proved to be their only top level season they hosted home matches at the Sisak City Stadium (normally used by HNK Segesta) as their own ground in Topolovac was unfit for first league football.

TŠK struggled to compete at that level throughout the season and eventually finished bottom of the 16-team league winning only 14 points in 30 matches and with a −64 goal difference. At the end of season they were relegated to the second level and then immediately slipped further down to Treća HNL in 2002–03 after narrowly escaping bankruptcy.

They also appeared in the Croatian Cup five times between 1998 and 2002. Their best cup result was reaching the quarter-finals in the 2001–02 season where they were knocked out by NK Osijek 5–0 on aggregate.

== Honours ==
- Croatian Third League – Centre Division (1): 1999–2000
