= Marijo Dodik =

Bosnian football striker

Personal information
- Date of birth: 18 February 1974 (age 52)
- Place of birth: Sarajevo, SFR Yugoslavia
- Height: 1.82 m (6 ft 0 in)
- Position: Striker

Senior career*
Years	Team	Apps	(Gls)
1993–1995	Željezničar		
1995–1998	Mechelen	84	(20)
1998	Sakaryaspor	2	(0)
1998–2007	Slaven Belupo	228	(75)
2007–2008	Cibalia	28	(5)
2008–2009	Inter Zaprešić	17	(4)
2009	Zelina	10	(1)
2010	Sabarija		
2010–2011	Mladost Mali Otok		
2011	Rudar Trbovlje		(5)
2012	Mladost Mali Otok		
2012–2013	Graničar Legrad		
2013	Bukovcan		
2014	GOŠK Gotalovo		
2014–2015	Bratstvo Kunovec		
2015	GOŠK Gotalovo		
2015	Omladinac-Sloga Heresin		

International career^{‡}
1998–2002	Bosnia-Herzegovina	4	(1)
- * Club domestic league appearances and goals as of 2 December 2008 ‡ National team caps and goals as of 2 December 2008

Marijo Dodik (born 18 February 1974 in Sarajevo) is a Bosnian retired football striker.

== Club career ==
Dodik started his career at Željezničar Sarajevo before leaving war-torn Bosnia and being picked up by the Belgian side Mechelen in 1995, where he spent two seasons in the Jupiler League and scored 20 goals in a total of 84 appearances. He spent the next season in Turkey's Sakaryaspor, before moving to Croatia and joining Slaven Belupo in 1998.

He spent his most successful years at Slaven, establishing himself as a first-team regular and the club's most prolific Prva HNL scorer with 75 goals in 228 appearances in a total of eight seasons between 1998 and 2007. During his time at Slaven he also netted 14 goals in 22 appearances in club's European campaigns in the Intertoto Cup, and holds the record for most goals scored by a player in a single Prva HNL game, scoring an incredible 6 goals against Varteks on 21 October 2000 in a 7–1 win.

In 2007, Slaven refused to renew his contract so he moved to Cibalia where he netted 5 goals in 28 appearances, and in 2008 he went on to Inter Zaprešić, where he played until 2009 and his retirement from professional football. Dodik continued, however, playing for lower-tier amateur Croatian and Slovenian teams, such as NK Zelina, NK Sabarija Subotica Podravska, NK Rudar Trbovlje and NK Mladost Mali Otok.

== International career ==
He made his debut for Bosnia and Herzegovina in a May 1998 friendly match away against Argentina and has earned a total of 4 caps, scoring 1 goal. He scored that goal in a 2002 World Cup qualifier against Liechtenstein in 2001. His final international was a March 2002 friendly against Macedonia.

=== International goals ===
Scores and results table. Bosnia and Herzegovina's goal tally first:

Goal	Date	Venue	Opponent	Score	Result	Competition
1.	7 October 2001	Koševo City Stadium, Sarajevo, Bosnia and Herzegovina	Liechtenstein	5–0	5–0	2002 FIFA World Cup qualification
