= Rajko Magić =

Croatian football manager

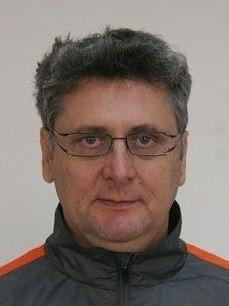
- Rajko Magić

Personal information
- Date of birth: 3 February 1955 (age 71)
- Place of birth: Čakovec, FPR Yugoslavia

Senior career*
Years	Team	Apps	(Gls)
- NK MTČ
- Lokomotiva

Managerial career
- 1992–1993: Čakovec
- 1993–1994: Hrvatski Dragovoljac
- 1995–1996: Šibenik
- 1998–1999: Šibenik
- 1999–2000: Istra
- 2000–2001: Kamen Ingrad
- 2002–2003: Slaven Belupo
- 2004–2006: Hrvatski Dragovoljac
- 2006–2008: Dinamo Zagreb (assistant)
- 2008–2009: Slaven Belupo (sports director)
- 2010: Shandong Luneng (assistant)
- 2011: Shandong Luneng (interim)
- 2012: Inter Zaprešić (sports director)
- 2013: Inter Zaprešić
- 2014: Johor Darul Takzim II
- 2014: Johor Darul Takzim (assistant)
- 2015: Johor Darul Takzim (dir. of football)
- 2018: Kuwait U23
- 2019: Kuwait U19
- * Club domestic league appearances and goals

Rajko Magić (Croatian pronunciation: [rǎːjko mǎːɡitɕ]; born 3 February 1955 in Čakovec) is a Croatian football manager and former player.

== Education ==
- 1995 graduate of the Higher School of Zagreb coach
- 2004 received a diploma UEFA PRO COACH

== Managing career ==
As a coach Magic worked in the Croatian national football since the establishment of the Croatian football league in 1992. During a coaching career as a head coach he worked in seven first division and in five second division clubs and independently led more than 600 official matches. With Slaven Belupo in 2002, he guided the team to reach the semifinals of UEFA Intertoto Cup. From 2006 to 2008 Magic worked at Dinamo Zagreb as an assistant coach to Branko Ivanković and won the Croatian championship, Croatian Cup and played in the UEFA Cup.

Magic also followed Ivanković to Chinese club Shandong Luneng as assistant coach in 2010. They helped the team win the Chinese Super League the same year. Following the sacking of Ivanković by Shandong Luneng during the season, Magic who was the assistant coach at that time stepped up into the head coach role. In 2012 Magic returns to Croatia to work with NK Inter Zaprešić for two years, where he worked as sport director in 2012 and head coach in 2013.

In 2014, Magic was employed by Johor State Football Association to supervise the teams under the association. In this capacity, he was assigned to Malaysian Premier League team Johor Darul Takzim II FC for the 2014 season, taking over from Azmi Mohamed. From April 2014, Magic also was assigned for the Malaysian Super League team Johor Darul Takzim FC, first as interim coach, and later as assistant coach to compatriot Bojan Hodak, helping the team win the 2014 Malaysia Super League title. From December 2014 he was appointed as director of football in charge of all JTD teams (I, II, III, President and Belia).

In 2018 and 2019 he worked with the Olympic team of Kuwait and won a quality tournament in October 2018 (final victory over Saudi Arabia U-23 with 4:2) and also, in March 2019, tournament in Bahrain with Kuwait U-19 team (final victory over Bahrain U-21 with 2:1)

== Extra work ==
From 2004 to the present, working as a lecturer at a Croatian Football Academy and teach football tactics for the UEFA PRO and A License.

In 2017, wrote a book named "TACTICAL TEAM EDUCATION" in which he presented a totally new team tactical training system. The book is issued and adopted by the Football Academy of the Croatian Football Association as an official reference book at the UEFA coaching seminars. During 2017 - 2020, works as an expert analyst on football matches on HNTV (Croatian Football television)
