= Željko Vuković (footballer, born 1963) =

Montenegrin footballer

Personal information
- Full name: Željko Vuković
- Date of birth: 29 March 1963 (age 63)
- Place of birth: Nikšić, FPR Yugoslavia
- Height: 1.80 m (5 ft 11 in)
- Position: Midfielder

Senior career*
Years	Team	Apps	(Gls)
1980–1988	Sutjeska Nikšić	110	(6)
1988–1989	Spartak Subotica	29	(7)
1989–1991	Chaves	25	(1)
1991–1992	Sutjeska Nikšić	6	(1)
1992–1993	FC Wolfurt		
1993–1994	Chaves	15	(4)
- * Club domestic league appearances and goals

Željko Vuković (Cyrillic: Жељко Вуковић; born 29 March 1963) is a Montenegrin former football midfielder.

== Club career ==
After playing for almost a decade with his hometown club FK Sutjeska Nikšić, he moved to another Yugoslav First League club, FK Spartak Subotica, in 1988, where he played for one season.

From 1989 onwards, he primarily played for the Portuguese Liga club G.D. Chaves, with a brief stint at the Austrian lower league club Wolfurt as well.
