= Gradski stadion (Sisak) =

Multi-use stadium in Sisak, Croatia

Coordinates: 45°28′42″N 16°22′38″E

Gradski Stadion
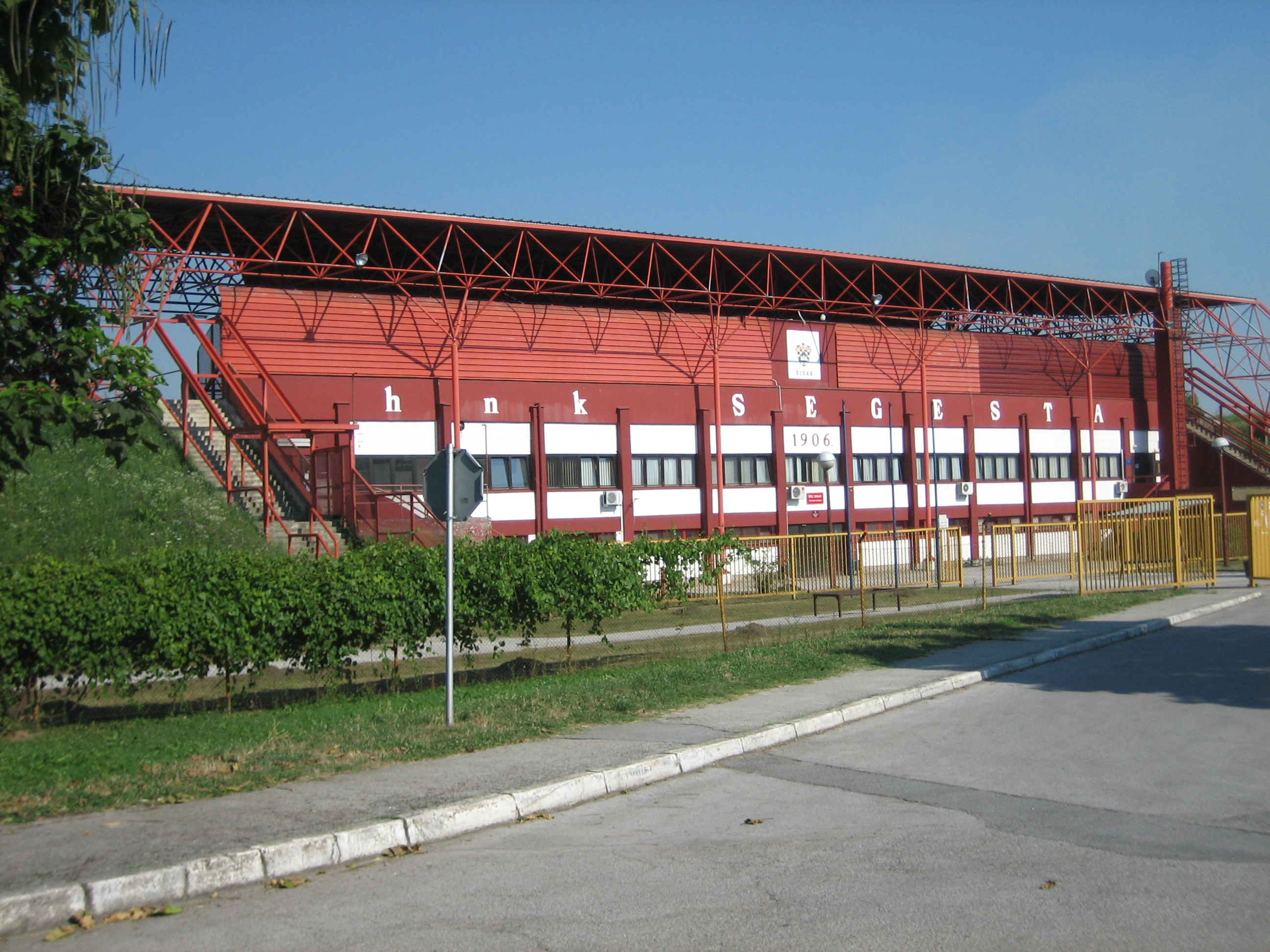
- Interactive map of Gradski Stadion
- Full name: Gradski Stadion
- Location: Sisak, Croatia
- Owner: Grad Sisak
- Operator: HNK Segesta
- Capacity: 8,000 (Football)
- Surface: Grass
- Field size: 105 m x 68 m

Construction
- Groundbreaking: 1954
- Built: 1954–1956
- Opened: 1956

Tenant
- HNK Segesta (1956–present)

Gradski Stadion (Croatian pronunciation: [grǎtskiː stâdijoːn]) is a multi-use stadium in Sisak, Croatia. It serves as home stadium for football club HNK Segesta. The stadium all seating capacity is 8,000 spectators.
