= Topolovac, Sisak-Moslavina County =

Coordinates: 45°27′38″N 16°26′09″E

Topolovac
- Village
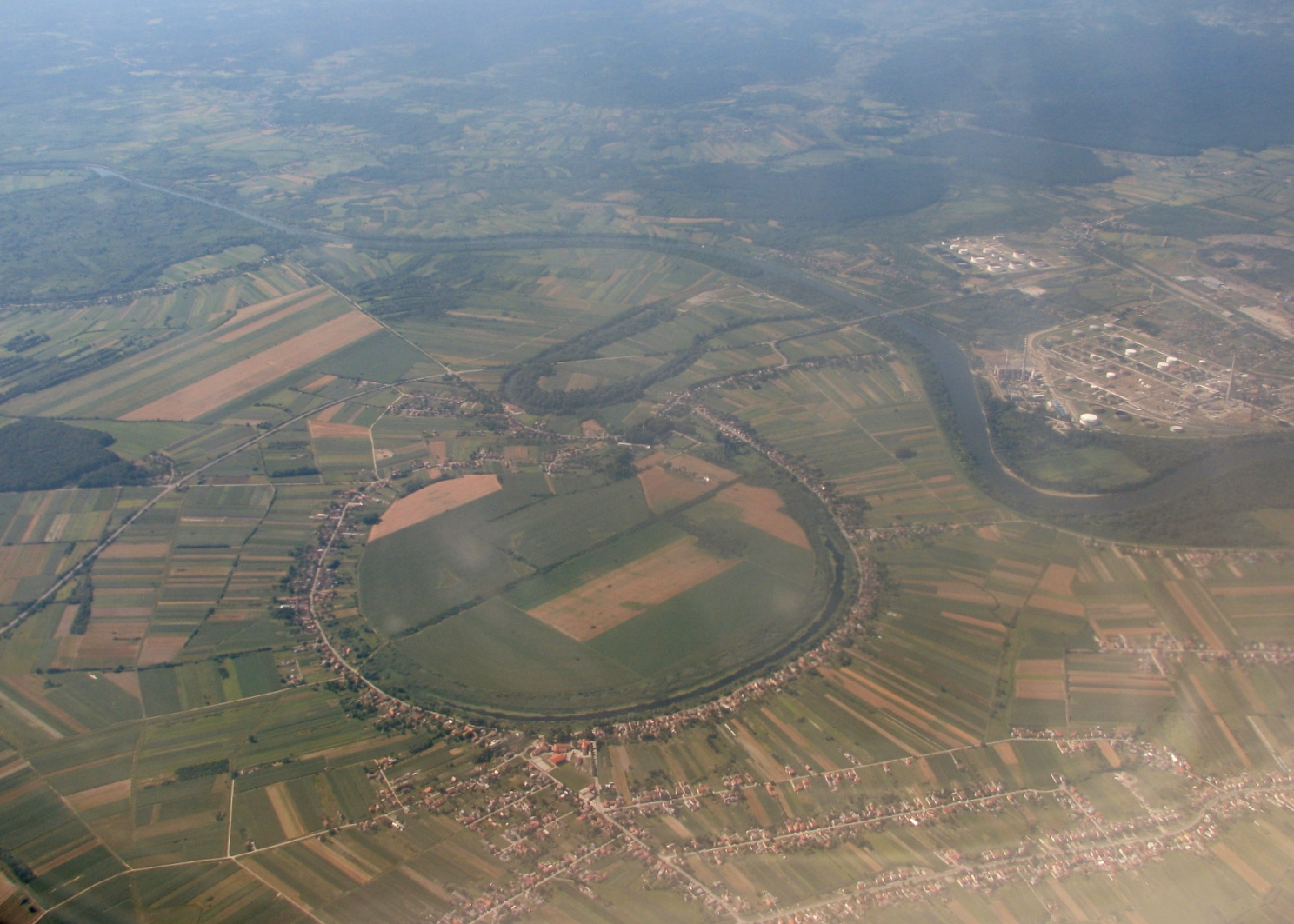
- Budašeo and Topolovac Settlements, Sisak-Moslavina County
- Interactive map of Topolovac
- Country: Croatia
- Region: Posavina
- County: Sisak-Moslavina County
- Town: Sisak

Area
  - Total: 22.1 km^{2} (8.5 sq mi)

Population (2021)
  - Total: 742
  - Density: 33.6/km^{2} (87.0/sq mi)
- Time zone: UTC+1 (CET)
  - Summer (DST): UTC+2 (CEST)
- Postal code: 44202 Topolovac

Topolovac is a village near Sisak, Croatia.

The local football club is NK TŠK Topolovac.
