= 1996–97 HNK Rijeka season =

Rijeka
1996–97 season
- Chairman: Franjo Šoda
- Manager: Branko Ivanković
- Prva HNL: 4th
- Croatian Cup: Round 2
- Top goalscorer: League: Admir Hasančić (10); All: Admir Hasančić (11)
- Highest home attendance: 7,000 vs Hajduk Split (26 April 1997 - Prva HNL)
- Lowest home attendance: 1,000 (2 times - Prva HNL)
- Average home league attendance: 3,333

The 1996–97 season was the 51st season in Rijeka's history. It was their 6th season in the Prva HNL and 23rd successive top tier season.

== Competitions ==
Competition	First match	Last match	Starting round	Final position	Record							
Competition	First match	Last match	Starting round	Final position	G	W	D	L	GF	GA	GD	Win %
Prva HNL	18 August 1996	1 June 1997	Matchday 1	4th	30	13	7	10	44	32	+12	43.33
Croatian Cup	14 August 1996	4 September 1996	First round	Second round	2	1	0	1	5	2	+3	50.00
Total					32	14	7	11	49	34	+15	43.75

=== Prva HNL ===
==== Classification ====
Pos	Team	Pld	W	D	L	GF	GA	GD	Pts	Qualification or relegation
2	Hajduk Split	30	18	6	6	53	22	+31	60	Qualification to UEFA Cup first qualifying round
3	Hrvatski Dragovoljac	30	13	10	7	51	37	+14	49	Qualification to Intertoto Cup group stage
4	Rijeka	30	13	7	10	44	32	+12	46	
5	NK Zagreb	30	13	6	11	43	39	+4	45	Qualification to Cup Winners' Cup qualifying round
6	Varteks	30	12	6	12	34	35	−1	42	

Source: RSSSF.org
Rules for classification: 1st points; 2nd head-to-head points; 3rd goal difference 4th goals scored

==== Results summary ====
Overall								Home						Away					
Pld	W	D	L	GF	GA	GD	Pts	W	D	L	GF	GA	GD	W	D	L	GF	GA	GD
30	13	7	10	44	32	+12	46	9	4	2	31	11	+20	4	3	8	13	21	−8

==== Results by round ====
Round	1	2	3	4	5	6	7	8	9	10	11	12	13	14	15	16	17	18	19	20	21	22	23	24	25	26	27	28	29	30
Ground	H	A	H	A	H	A	H	A	H	H	A	H	A	H	A	A	H	A	H	A	H	A	H	A	A	H	A	H	A	H
Result	W	D	D	L	W	L	L	L	D	D	W	W	L	W	L	W	W	W	W	D	W	L	L	L	D	W	L	D	W	W
Position	3	5	8	9	6	8	9	11	12	13	10	8	10	7	10	8	6	5	3	4	4	4	4	6	6	5	5	5	5	4

Source: Competitive matches
A = Away; H = Home; W = Win; D = Draw; L = Loss

== Matches ==
=== Prva HNL ===
Round	Date	Venue	Opponent	Score	Attendance	Rijeka Scorers	Report
1	18 Aug	H	Istra	2 – 0	4,000	Perković, Samardžić	HRnogomet.com
2	25 Aug	A	Orijent	2 – 2	6,000	Ostojić, o.g.	HRnogomet.com
3	1 Sep	H	Šibenik	0 – 0	3,500		HRnogomet.com
4	8 Sep	A	Osijek	0 – 4	1,500		HRnogomet.com
5	15 Sep	H	Varteks	1 – 0	2,500	Balaban	HRnogomet.com
6	22 Sep	A	Marsonia	0 – 1	1,700		HRnogomet.com
7	29 Sep	H	Croatia Zagreb	1 – 2	6,000	Brkić	HRnogomet.com
8	13 Oct	A	Hajduk Split	0 – 1	8,000		HRnogomet.com
9	20 Oct	H	Hrvatski Dragovoljac	2 – 2	2,000	Brkić, Milinović	HRnogomet.com
10	27 Oct	H	Mladost 127	0 – 0	2,000		HRnogomet.com
11	3 Nov	A	Cibalia	4 – 1	1,500	Hasančić (2), Brkić, Perković	HRnogomet.com
12	17 Nov	H	Segesta	2 – 0	2,500	Ivančić, Brkić	HRnogomet.com
13	24 Nov	A	Zadarkomerc	0 – 2	1,000		HRnogomet.com
14	1 Dec	H	Inker Zaprešić	4 – 0	1,000	Hasančić, Tokić, Jedvaj, Perković	HRnogomet.com
15	8 Dec	A	Zagreb	0 – 3	400		HRnogomet.com
16	2 Mar	A	Istra	2 – 0	3,500	o.g., Brkić	HRnogomet.com
17	9 Mar	H	Orijent	4 – 0	6,000	Brkić (2), Anić, Hasančić	HRnogomet.com
18	16 Mar	A	Šibenik	1 – 0	2,000	Hasančić	HRnogomet.com
19	23 Mar	H	Osijek	2 – 0	3,500	Brkić, Seferović	HRnogomet.com
20	5 Apr	A	Varteks	0 – 0	3,000		HRnogomet.com
21	12 Apr	H	Marsonia	5 – 3	3,000	Seferović, Hasančić (2), o.g., Brkić	HRnogomet.com
22	20 Apr	A	Croatia Zagreb	0 – 3	2,000		HRnogomet.com
23	26 Apr	H	Hajduk Split	1 – 3	7,000	Tokić	HRnogomet.com
24	3 May	AR	Hrvatski Dragovoljac	2 – 3	700	Tokić, Ivančić	HRnogomet.com
25	7 May	A	Mladost 127	0 – 0	2,500		HRnogomet.com
26	11 May	H	Cibalia	3 – 0	3,000	Perković, Hasančić, Milinović	HRnogomet.com
27	18 May	A	Segesta	0 – 1	1,000		HRnogomet.com
28	21 May	H	Zadarkomerc	1 – 1	1,000	Cimirotič	HRnogomet.com
29	25 May	A	Inker Zaprešić	2 – 0	300	Anić, Hasančić	HRnogomet.com
30	1 Jun	H	Zagreb	3 – 0	3,000	Hasančić, Perković, Cimirotič	HRnogomet.com

Source: HRnogomet.com

=== Croatian Cup ===
Round	Date	Venue	Opponent	Score	Rijeka Scorers	Report
R1	14 Aug	A	Varaždin	5 – 1	Marković, Milinović, Hasančić, Perković, Ivančić	HRnogomet.com
R2	4 Sep	AR	Hrvatski Dragovoljac	0 – 1 (aet)		HRnogomet.com

Source: HRnogomet.com

=== Squad statistics ===
Competitive matches only.
Appearances in brackets indicate numbers of times the player came on as a substitute.

Name	Apps	Goals	Apps	Goals	Apps	Goals
Name	League		Cup		Total	
(Croatia) Mladen Žganjer	14 (0)	0	2 (0)	0	16 (0)	0
(Croatia) Đoni Tafra	16 (0)	0	0 (0)	0	16 (0)	0
(Croatia) Mladen Ivančić	20 (4)	2	1 (1)	1	21 (5)	3
(Croatia) Damir Milinović	26 (0)	2	2 (0)	1	28 (0)	3
(Croatia) Mario Tokić	25 (2)	3	2 (0)	0	27 (2)	3
(Croatia) Mladen Romić	25 (1)	0	2 (0)	0	27 (1)	0
(Croatia) Dario Smoje	12 (2)	0	0 (0)	0	12 (2)	0
(Croatia) Borimir Perković	21 (2)	5	2 (0)	1	23 (2)	6
(Bosnia and Herzegovina) Senad Brkić	17 (0)	9	0 (0)	0	17 (0)	9
(Bosnia and Herzegovina) Admir Hasančić	21 (1)	10	1 (0)	1	22 (1)	11
(Croatia) Stjepan Ostojić	15 (8)	1	2 (0)	0	17 (8)	1
(Croatia) Dalibor Višković	21 (2)	0	1 (1)	0	22 (3)	0
(Croatia) Zdenko Jedvaj	16 (1)	1	1 (0)	0	17 (1)	1
(Croatia) Jasmin Agić	10 (10)	0	0 (0)	0	10 (10)	0
(Croatia) Boško Anić	14 (0)	2	0 (0)	0	14 (0)	2
(Bosnia and Herzegovina) Sead Seferović	10 (6)	2	0 (0)	0	10 (6)	2
(Croatia) Boško Balaban	11 (8)	1	0 (1)	0	11 (9)	1
(Croatia) Branko Panić	6 (5)	0	0 (0)	0	6 (5)	0
(Slovenia) Sebastjan Cimirotič	8 (2)	2	0 (0)	0	8 (2)	2
(Croatia) Renato Pilipović	0 (7)	0	1 (0)	0	1 (7)	0
(Croatia) Davor Dželalija	6 (0)	0	0 (0)	0	6 (0)	0
(Croatia) Jasmin Samardžić	0 (6)	1	0 (1)	0	0 (7)	1
(Croatia) Alen Horvat	2 (1)	0	2 (0)	0	4 (1)	0
(Croatia) Elvis Brajković	5 (0)	0	0 (0)	0	5 (0)	0
(Slovenia) Igor Benedejčič	5 (0)	0	0 (0)	0	5 (0)	0
(Croatia) Renato Marković	2 (7)	0	2 (0)	1	4 (7)	1
(Croatia) Igor Bernobić	1 (2)	0	0 (1)	0	1 (3)	0
(Croatia) Nenad Zorić	1 (0)	0	1 (0)	0	2 (0)	0
(Croatia) Andrej Živković	0 (1)	0	0 (1)	0	0 (2)	0

== See also ==
- 1996–97 Prva HNL
- 1996–97 Croatian Cup

== External sources ==
- 1996–97 Prva HNL at HRnogomet.com
- 1996–97 Croatian Cup at HRnogomet.com
- Prvenstvo 1996.-97. at nk-rijeka.hr
