= 1997–98 HNK Rijeka season =

Rijeka
1997–98 season
- Chairman: Prof. Žarko Tomljanović
- Manager: Branko Ivanković, Nenad Gračan
- Prva HNL: 7th
- Croatian Cup: Round 2
- Top goalscorer: League: Admir Hasančić (11); All: Admir Hasančić (11)
- Highest home attendance: 7,500 vs Croatia Zagreb (21 September 1997 - Prva HNL)
- Lowest home attendance: 1,000 (2 times - Prva HNL)
- Average home league attendance: 2,619

The 1997–98 season was the 52nd season in Rijeka's history. It was their 7th season in the Prva HNL and 24th successive top tier season.

== Competitions ==
Competition	First match	Last match	Starting round	Final position	Record							
Competition	First match	Last match	Starting round	Final position	G	W	D	L	GF	GA	GD	Win %
Prva HNL	3 August 1997	10 May 1998	Matchday 1	7th	32	9	14	9	36	37	−1	28.13
Croatian Cup	6 August 1997	1 October 1997	First round	Second round	2	1	0	1	3	2	+1	50.00
Total					34	10	14	10	39	39	+0	29.41

=== Prva HNL ===
==== First stage ====
Pos	Team	Pld	W	D	L	GF	GA	GD	Pts	Qualification
5	Osijek	22	9	5	8	29	26	+3	32	Qualification to championship group
6	Zadarkomerc	22	8	4	10	25	24	+1	28	Qualification to championship group
7	Rijeka	22	5	11	6	20	24	−4	26	Qualification to relegation group
8	Varteks	22	6	6	10	24	32	−8	24	Qualification to relegation group
9	Slaven Belupo	22	6	5	11	20	43	−23	23 (Note: Head-to-head record: Slaven Belupo–Mladost 127 2–0, Mladost 127–Slaven Belupo 2–1.)	Qualification to relegation group

Source: RSSSF.org
Rules for classification: 1st points; 2nd head-to-head points; 3rd head-to-head goal difference; 4th head-to-head away goals scored

==== Second stage (relegation play-off) ====
Pos	Team	Pld	W	D	L	GF	GA	GD	Pts	Qualification or relegation
7	Rijeka	10	4	3	3	16	13	+3	28	
8	Šibenik	10	5	3	2	16	8	+8	27	
9	Slaven Belupo	10	5	0	5	11	13	−2	27	
10	Varteks	10	4	2	4	10	12	−2	26	Qualification to Cup Winners' Cup first round
11	Mladost 127 (O)	10	4	1	5	13	11	+2	25	Qualification to relegation play-off
12	Samobor (R)	10	3	1	6	11	20	−9	21	Relegation to Croatian Second Football League

Source: RSSSF.org
Rules for classification: 1st points; 2nd head-to-head points; 3rd head-to-head goal difference; 4th head-to-head away goals scored
(O) Play-off winners; (R) Relegated

==== Results summary ====
Overall								Home						Away					
Pld	W	D	L	GF	GA	GD	Pts	W	D	L	GF	GA	GD	W	D	L	GF	GA	GD
32	9	14	9	36	37	−1	41	8	8	0	26	12	+14	1	6	9	10	25	−15

==== Results by round ====
Round	1	2	3	4	5	6	7	8	9	10	11	12	13	14	15	16	17	18	19	20	21	22	23	24	25	26	27	28	29	30	31	32
Ground	H	A	H	A	H	A	H	A	H	H	A	A	H	A	H	A	H	A	H	A	A	H	H	H	A	H	A	A	A	H	A	H
Result	W	D	W	D	D	L	D	L	W	D	L	D	W	D	D	L	D	L	D	D	L	W	D	W	L	W	L	W	D	W	L	D
Position	5	4	3	5	6	6	6	6	6	6	6	6	6	6	6	6	6	6	7	7	8	7	9	7	8	7	8	7	7	7	7	7

Source: Competitive matches
A = Away; H = Home; W = Win; D = Draw; L = Loss

== Matches ==
=== Prva HNL ===
Round	Date	Venue	Opponent	Score	Attendance	Rijeka Scorers	Report
1	3 Aug	H	Slaven Belupo	1 – 0	3,000	Hasančić	HRnogomet.com
2	10 Aug	A	Zagreb	2 – 2	2,500	Brkić, Mladenović	HRnogomet.com
3	17 Aug	H	Mladost 127	2 – 0	2,500	Cimirotič, Hasančić	HRnogomet.com
4	24 Aug	A	Varteks	1 – 1	3,000	Mladenović	HRnogomet.com
5	31 Aug	H	Osijek	1 – 1	5,000	o.g.	HRnogomet.com
6	12 Sep	A	Hajduk Split	1 – 2	5,000	Cimirotič	HRnogomet.com
7	21 Sep	H	Croatia Zagreb	1 – 1	7,500	Pilipović	HRnogomet.com
8	28 Sep	A	Samobor	0 – 2	1,000		HRnogomet.com
9	5 Oct	H	Šibenik	3 – 1	1,500	Benedejčič, Balaban, Hasančić	HRnogomet.com
10	19 Oct	H	Zadarkomerc	1 – 1	2,000	Peršon	HRnogomet.com
11	26 Oct	AR	Hrvatski Dragovoljac	0 – 3	300		HRnogomet.com
12	2 Nov	A	Slaven Belupo	0 – 0	3,000		HRnogomet.com
13	9 Nov	H	Zagreb	2 – 1	1,500	Brkić (2)	HRnogomet.com
14	19 Nov	A	Mladost 127	1 – 1	1,500	Ivančić	HRnogomet.com
15	23 Nov	H	Varteks	1 – 1	2,000	Hasančić	HRnogomet.com
16	29 Nov	A	Osijek	0 – 2	1,500		HRnogomet.com
17	7 Dec	H	Hajduk Split	1 – 1	7,000	Benedejčič	HRnogomet.com
18	22 Feb	A	Croatia Zagreb	0 – 2	4,000		HRnogomet.com
19	1 Mar	H	Samobor	0 – 0	2,000		HRnogomet.com
20	8 Mar	A	Šibenik	1 – 1	2,000	Milinović	HRnogomet.com
21	11 Mar	A	Zadarkomerc	0 – 1	5,500		HRnogomet.com
22	15 Mar	H	Hrvatski Dragovoljac	1 – 0	2,000	Brkić	HRnogomet.com
23	22 Mar	H	Šibenik	0 – 0	1,000		HRnogomet.com
24	29 Mar	H	Varteks	4 – 1	1,200	Ivančić, Hasančić (2), Milinović	HRnogomet.com
25	5 Apr	A	Slaven Belupo	0 – 1	3,000		HRnogomet.com
26	8 Apr	H	Mladost 127	3 – 2	1,200	Hasančić (2), Ivančić	HRnogomet.com
27	11 Apr	A	Samobor	1 – 3	700	Budan	HRnogomet.com
28	19 Apr	A	Šibenik	1 – 0	2,000	Seferović	HRnogomet.com
29	26 Apr	A	Varteks	1 – 1	3,000	Hasančić	HRnogomet.com
30	29 Apr	H	Slaven Belupo	4 – 1	1,000	Brkić, Hasančić (2), Budan	HRnogomet.com
31	3 May	A	Mladost 127	1 – 3	5,000	Šimić	HRnogomet.com
32	10 May	H	Samobor	1 – 1	1,500	Brkić	HRnogomet.com

Source: HRnogomet.com

=== Croatian Cup ===
Round	Date	Venue	Opponent	Score	Attendance	Rijeka Scorers	Report
R1	6 Aug	A	Olimpija Osijek	3 – 0	600	Brkić, Ivančić, Mladenović	HRnogomet.com
R2	1 Oct	H	Orijent	0 – 2	1,500		HRnogomet.com

Source: HRnogomet.com

=== Squad statistics ===
Competitive matches only.
Appearances in brackets indicate numbers of times the player came on as a substitute.

Name	Apps	Goals	Apps	Goals	Apps	Goals
Name	League		Cup		Total	
(Croatia) Đoni Tafra	26 (0)	0	1 (0)	0	27 (0)	0
(Croatia) Mladen Ivančić	30 (0)	3	2 (0)	1	32 (0)	4
(Croatia) Damir Milinović	14 (0)	2	0 (0)	0	14 (0)	2
(Croatia) Mario Tokić	25 (0)	0	1 (0)	0	26 (0)	0
(Croatia) Saša Peršon	18 (2)	1	1 (0)	0	19 (2)	1
(Croatia) Mladen Romić	16 (5)	0	1 (0)	0	17 (5)	0
(Bosnia and Herzegovina) Senad Brkić	22 (4)	6	0 (1)	1	22 (5)	7
(Bosnia and Herzegovina) Admir Hasančić	28 (0)	11	2 (0)	0	30 (0)	11
(Croatia) Jasmin Agić	22 (6)	0	1 (1)	0	23 (7)	0
(Croatia) Saša Paska	16 (2)	0	2 (0)	0	18 (2)	0
(Slovenia) Igor Benedejčič	22 (4)	2	1 (0)	0	23 (4)	2
(Croatia) Renato Pilipović	18 (7)	1	0 (2)	0	18 (9)	1
(Croatia) Dalibor Višković	18 (3)	0	2 (0)	0	20 (3)	0
(Bosnia and Herzegovina) Sead Seferović	24 (2)	1	1 (0)	0	25 (2)	1
(Croatia) Boško Balaban	8 (18)	1	2 (0)	0	10 (18)	1
(Slovenia) Sebastjan Cimirotič	8 (2)	2	2 (0)	0	10 (2)	2
(Croatia) Mladen Mladenović	9 (0)	2	2 (0)	1	11 (0)	3
(Croatia) Igor Budan	6 (4)	2	0 (0)	0	6 (4)	2
(Croatia) Željko Župetić	9 (1)	0	0 (0)	0	9 (1)	0
(Croatia) Mladen Žganjer	6 (0)	0	1 (0)	0	7 (0)	0
(Croatia) Marko Grubišić	1 (9)	0	0 (0)	0	1 (9)	0
(Croatia) Vedran Madžar	4 (2)	0	0 (0)	0	4 (2)	0
(Croatia) Slađanko Marić	0 (5)	0	0 (0)	0	0 (5)	0
(Croatia) Branko Panić	1 (1)	0	0 (0)	0	1 (1)	0
(Croatia) Zdravko Šimić	1 (1)	1	0 (0)	0	1 (1)	1
(Albania) Redi Jupi	0 (3)	0	0 (0)	0	0 (3)	0
(Croatia) Ljupko Kontešić	0 (3)	0	0 (0)	0	0 (3)	0

== See also ==
- 1997–98 Prva HNL
- 1997–98 Croatian Cup

== External sources ==
- 1997–98 Prva HNL at HRnogomet.com
- 1997–98 Croatian Cup at HRnogomet.com
- Prvenstvo 1997.-98. at nk-rijeka.hr
