= 1995–96 HNK Rijeka season =

Rijeka
1995–96 season
- Chairman: Hrvoje Šarinić
- Manager: Marijan Jantoljak, Ranko Buketa, Zoran Šestan, Josip Skoblar, Miroslav Blažević, Nenad Gračan
- Prva HNL: 9th
- Croatian Cup: Quarterfinal
- Top goalscorer: League: Senad Brkić (15); All: Senad Brkić (16)
- Highest home attendance: 6,000 vs (Croatia) Hajduk Split and (Croatia) Istra (17 February 1996 and 22 May 1996 - Prva HNL)
- Lowest home attendance: 200 (2 times - Croatian Cup)
- Average home league attendance: 2,350

The 1995–96 season was the 50th season in Rijeka's history. It was their 5th season in the Prva HNL and 22nd successive top tier season.

== Competitions ==
Competition	First match	Last match	Starting round	Final position	Record							
Competition	First match	Last match	Starting round	Final position	G	W	D	L	GF	GA	GD	Win %
Prva HNL	14 August 1995	26 May 1996	Matchday 1	9th	36	11	8	17	46	56	−10	30.56
Croatian Cup	23 August 1995	20 March 1996	First round	Quarterfinal	6	3	1	2	10	10	+0	50.00
Total					42	14	9	19	56	66	−10	33.33

=== Prva HNL ===
==== First stage ====
Pos	Team	Pld	W	D	L	GF	GA	GD	Pts	Qualification
8	Inker Zaprešić	22	7	6	9	28	38	−10	27 (Note: Head-to-head points: Cibalia 8 pts, Inker 5 pts, Šibenik 3 pts.)	Qualification to Prva A HNL play-off
9	Šibenik	22	7	6	9	25	28	−3	27	Qualification to Prva A HNL play-off
10	Marsonia	22	6	3	13	14	33	−19	21	Qualification to Prva A HNL play-off
11	Rijeka	22	4	5	13	25	42	−17	17 (Note: Head-to-head record: Rijeka–Istra Pula 4–0, Istra Pula–Rijeka 0–1.)	Qualification to Prva A HNL play-off
12	Istra Pula	22	3	8	11	16	36	−20	17	Qualification to Prva A HNL play-off

Source: RSSSF.org
Rules for classification: 1st points; 2nd head-to-head points; 3rd goal difference 4th goals scored.

==== Second stage (relegation play-off) ====
Pos	Team	Pld	W	D	L	GF	GA	GD	Pts	Qualification
1	Šibenik	14	8	0	6	19	15	+4	28	
2	Segesta	14	6	3	5	19	18	+1	28	Qualification to Intertoto Cup group stage
3	Rijeka	14	7	3	4	21	14	+7	26	
4	Mladost 127	14	7	3	4	22	14	+8	25	
5	Istra Pula	14	7	2	5	17	17	0	24	

Source: RSSSF.org
Rules for classification: 1st points; 2nd head-to-head points; 3rd goal difference 4th goals scored.

==== Results summary ====
Overall								Home						Away					
Pld	W	D	L	GF	GA	GD	Pts	W	D	L	GF	GA	GD	W	D	L	GF	GA	GD
36	11	8	17	46	56	−10	41	9	4	5	35	23	+12	2	4	12	11	33	−22

==== Results by round ====
Round	1	2	3	4	5	6	7	8	9	10	11	12	13	14	15	16	17	18	19	20	21	22	23	24	25	26	27	28	29	30	31	32	33	34	35	36
Ground	H	A	H	A	H	A	H	H	A	H	A	A	H	A	H	A	H	A	A	H	A	H	A	H	A	A	H	A	H	H	A	H	H	A	H	A
Result	L	W	D	L	W	L	W	L	L	D	L	L	L	D	D	W	D	L	L	L	L	L	L	W	D	D	W	L	W	W	L	W	W	D	W	L
Position	8	6	5	8	5	7	4	6	8	8	9	10	12	11	11	10	10	10	11	11	11	11	13	13	13	11	10	11	10	9	10	9	8	9	8	9

Source: Competitive matches
A = Away; H = Home; W = Win; D = Draw; L = Loss

== Matches ==
=== Prva HNL ===
Round	Date	Venue	Opponent	Score	Attendance	Rijeka Scorers	Report
1	13 Aug	H	Zagreb	1 – 2	3,500	Brkić	HRnogomet.com
2	20 Aug	A	Marsonia	1 – 0	3,000	Gračan	HRnogomet.com
3	27 Aug	H	Cibalia	4 – 4	1,000	Horvat, Brkić (2), Perković	HRnogomet.com
4	10 Sep	A	Varteks	1 – 2	3,000	Brkić	HRnogomet.com
5	13 Sep	H	Istra	4 – 0	1,000	Dželalija (2), Perković, Živković	HRnogomet.com
6	17 Sep	A	Croatia Zagreb	0 – 2	4,000		HRnogomet.com
7	20 Sep	H	Šibenik	3 – 1	1,000	Perković, Dželalija, Brkić	HRnogomet.com
8	24 Sep	H	Osijek	0 – 2	2,000		HRnogomet.com
9	1 Oct	A	Hajduk Split	0 – 1	4,000		HRnogomet.com
10	15 Oct	H	Inker Zaprešić	4 – 4	1,000	Milinović (2), Samardžić (2)	HRnogomet.com
11	22 Oct	A	Segesta	0 – 6	1,500		HRnogomet.com
12	29 Oct	A	Zagreb	0 – 3	1,000		HRnogomet.com
13	5 Nov	H	Marsonia	0 – 1	800		HRnogomet.com
14	11 Nov	A	Cibalia	1 – 1	500	Brkić	HRnogomet.com
15	19 Nov	H	Varteks	2 – 2	500	Dželalija, Smoje	HRnogomet.com
16	26 Nov	A	Istra	1 – 0	2,500	Brkić	HRnogomet.com
17	3 Dec	H	Croatia Zagreb	1 – 1	5,000	Perković	HRnogomet.com
18	10 Dec	A	Šibenik	1 – 2	1,500	Brkić	HRnogomet.com
19	17 Dec	A	Osijek	0 – 1	3,000		HRnogomet.com
20	17 Feb	H	Hajduk Split	0 – 3	6,000		HRnogomet.com
21	24 Feb	A	Inker Zaprešić	1 – 3	400	Dželalija	HRnogomet.com
22	3 Mar	H	Segesta	0 – 1	1,000		HRnogomet.com
23	10 Mar	A	Marsonia	0 – 1	3,000		HRnogomet.com
24	17 Mar	H	Inker Zaprešić	2 – 0	1,500	Hasančić, Brkić	HRnogomet.com
25	24 Mar	A	Cibalia	2 – 2	1,500	Brkić (2)	HRnogomet.com
26	31 Mar	A	Mladost 127	0 – 0	3,000		HRnogomet.com
27	6 Apr	H	Segesta	2 – 0	2,000	Tokić, Dželalija	HRnogomet.com
28	14 Apr	A	Istra	0 – 1	8,000		HRnogomet.com
29	21 Apr	H	Šibenik	2 – 0	4,000	Perković, Hasančić	HRnogomet.com
30	24 Apr	H	Marsonia	2 – 1	2,000	Milinović, Brkić	HRnogomet.com
31	27 Apr	A	Inker Zaprešić	0 – 2	1,000		HRnogomet.com
32	5 May	H	Cibalia	2 – 0	2,000	Hasančić, Perković	HRnogomet.com
33	12 May	H	Mladost 127	2 – 0	2,000	Perković, Hasančić	HRnogomet.com
34	19 May	A	Segesta	3 – 3	1,200	Brkić (2), Dželalija	HRnogomet.com
35	22 May	H	Istra	4 – 1	6,000	Perković (3), Brkić	HRnogomet.com
36	26 May	A	Šibenik	0 – 3	4,000		HRnogomet.com

Source: HRnogomet.com

=== Croatian Cup ===
Round	Date	Venue	Opponent	Score	Attendance	Rijeka Scorers	Report
R1	23 Aug	A	Nehaj Senj	5 – 1	?	Pilipović, Tokić, Perković, Brkić, Dželalija	HRnogomet.com
R1	6 Sep	H	Nehaj Senj	3 – 1	400	Pilipović, Samardžić, Milinović	HRnogomet.com
R2	11 Oct	A	Slaven Belupo	1 – 1	2,500	Dželalija	HRnogomet.com
R2	25 Oct	H	Slaven Belupo	1 – 0	200	Perković	HRnogomet.com
QF	6 Mar	A	Zagreb	0 – 5	1,000		HRnogomet.com
QF	20 Mar	H	Zagreb	0 – 2	200		HRnogomet.com

Source: HRnogomet.com

=== Squad statistics ===
Competitive matches only.
Appearances in brackets indicate numbers of times the player came on as a substitute.

Name	Apps	Goals	Apps	Goals	Apps	Goals
Name	League		Cup		Total	
(Croatia) Mladen Žganjer	17 (1)	0	5 (0)	0	22 (1)	0
(Croatia) Mladen Ivančić	19 (6)	0	3 (1)	0	22 (7)	0
(Croatia) Damir Milinović	31 (1)	3	5 (0)	1	36 (1)	4
(Croatia) Mario Tokić	34 (0)	1	5 (1)	1	39 (1)	2
(Croatia) Dario Smoje	21 (0)	1	2 (0)	0	23 (0)	1
(Croatia) Alen Horvat	16 (3)	1	4 (0)	0	20 (3)	1
(Croatia) Andrej Živković	24 (7)	1	3 (1)	0	27 (8)	1
(Croatia) Davor Dželalija	29 (2)	7	4 (0)	2	33 (2)	9
(Croatia) Borimir Perković	30 (0)	10	4 (1)	2	34 (1)	12
(Bosnia and Herzegovina) Senad Brkić	31 (0)	15	4 (0)	1	35 (0)	16
(Bosnia and Herzegovina) Admir Hasančić	17 (10)	4	0 (3)	0	17 (13)	4
(Croatia) Stjepan Ostojić	15 (6)	0	3 (0)	0	18 (6)	0
(Croatia) Igor Bernobić	10 (3)	0	2 (0)	0	12 (3)	0
(Croatia) Renato Pilipović	7 (7)	0	3 (2)	2	10 (9)	2
(Croatia) Dalibor Višković	12 (2)	0	2 (1)	0	14 (3)	0
(Croatia) Irenko Jurić	11 (3)	0	3 (0)	0	14 (3)	0
(Croatia) Zoran Slavica	13 (0)	0	0 (0)	0	13 (0)	0
(Croatia) Dean Mladenić	6 (1)	0	1 (0)	0	7 (1)	0
(Croatia) Nenad Gračan	9 (1)	1	3 (0)	0	12 (1)	1
(Croatia) Jasmin Samardžić	5 (8)	2	2 (3)	1	7 (11)	3
(Croatia) Robert Vladislavić	9 (0)	0	1 (0)	0	10 (0)	0
(Croatia) Mladen Romić	10 (0)	0	0 (0)	0	10 (0)	0
(Bosnia and Herzegovina) Almir Hodžić	1 (4)	0	2 (1)	0	3 (5)	0
(Bosnia and Herzegovina) Ekrem Bradarić	5 (2)	0	2 (1)	0	7 (3)	0
(Croatia) Damir Uremović	2 (5)	0	0 (0)	0	2 (5)	0
(Croatia) Vlado Tomljenović	3 (2)	0	0 (0)	0	3 (2)	0
(Croatia) Renato Marković	0 (1)	0	1 (1)	0	1 (2)	0
(Croatia) Robert Rubčić	5 (0)	0	1 (0)	0	6 (0)	0
(Croatia) Roberto Paliska	1 (0)	0	0 (0)	0	1 (0)	0
(Croatia) Dragan Skočić	2 (0)	0	1 (0)	0	3 (0)	0
(Cameroon) Yves Belle-Belle	1 (5)	0	0 (1)	0	1 (6)	0
(Croatia) Boško Balaban	0 (3)	0	0 (0)	0	0 (3)	0
(Croatia) Senad Rožajac	0 (2)	0	0 (0)	0	0 (2)	0

== See also ==
- 1995–96 Prva HNL
- 1995–96 Croatian Cup
