= 1998–99 HNK Rijeka season =

Rijeka
1998–99 season
- Chairman: Prof. Žarko Tomljanović
- Manager: Nenad Gračan
- Prva HNL: 2nd
- Croatian Cup: Round 2
- Top goalscorer: League: Igor Musa, Barnabás Sztipánovics (14); All: Igor Musa (15)
- Highest home attendance: 22,000 vs Osijek (26 May 1999 - Prva HNL)
- Lowest home attendance: 1,500 vs Mladost 127 (31 October 1998 - Prva HNL)
- Average home league attendance: 8,500

The 1998–99 season was the 53rd season in Rijeka's history. It was their 8th season in the Prva HNL and 25th successive top tier season.

== Competitions ==
Competition	First match	Last match	Starting round	Final position	Record							
Competition	First match	Last match	Starting round	Final position	G	W	D	L	GF	GA	GD	Win %
Prva HNL	9 August 1998	26 May 1999	Matchday 1	2nd	32	22	4	6	53	33	+20	68.75
Croatian Cup	9 September 1998	23 September 1998	First round	Second round	2	1	0	1	2	2	+0	50.00
Total					34	23	4	7	55	35	+20	67.65

=== Prva HNL ===
==== First stage ====
Pos	Team	Pld	W	D	L	GF	GA	GD	Pts	Qualification
1	Croatia Zagreb	22	17	2	3	44	14	+30	53	Qualification to championship group
2	Rijeka	22	17	1	4	35	18	+17	52	Qualification to championship group
3	Hajduk Split	22	12	6	4	38	17	+21	42	Qualification to championship group
4	Osijek	22	11	3	8	37	23	+14	36	Qualification to championship group
5	Varteks	22	9	3	10	40	36	+4	30	Qualification to championship group

Source: RSSSF.org
Rules for classification: 1st points; 2nd head-to-head points; 3rd head-to-head goal difference; 4th head-to-head away goals scored

==== Second stage (championship play-off) ====
Pos	Team	Pld	W	D	L	GF	GA	GD	Pts	Qualification
1	Croatia Zagreb (C)	10	5	3	2	11	6	+5	45	Qualification to Champions League third qualifying round
2	Rijeka	10	5	3	2	18	15	+3	44	Qualification to Champions League second qualifying round
3	Hajduk Split	10	5	3	2	24	15	+9	39	Qualification to UEFA Cup qualifying round
4	Osijek	10	3	3	4	14	16	−2	30	Qualification to UEFA Cup first round
5	Hrvatski Dragovoljac	10	3	1	6	15	21	−6	23	Qualification to Intertoto Cup first round
6	Varteks	10	2	1	7	10	19	−9	22	Qualification to Intertoto Cup first round

Source: RSSSF.org
Rules for classification: 1st points; 2nd head-to-head points; 3rd head-to-head goal difference; 4th head-to-head away goals scored
(C) Champions

==== Results summary ====
Overall								Home						Away					
Pld	W	D	L	GF	GA	GD	Pts	W	D	L	GF	GA	GD	W	D	L	GF	GA	GD
32	22	4	6	53	33	+20	70	12	3	1	31	13	+18	10	1	5	22	20	+2

==== Results by round ====
Round	1	2	3	4	5	6	7	8	9	10	11	12	13	14	15	16	17	18	19	20	21	22	23	24	25	26	27	28	29	30	31	32
Ground	A	H	A	A	H	A	H	A	H	A	H	H	A	H	H	A	H	A	H	A	H	A	H	A	H	H	A	A	H	A	A	H
Result	W	D	W	L	W	L	W	W	W	L	W	W	W	W	W	W	W	W	W	L	W	W	W	W	W	D	L	D	L	W	W	D
Position	3	4	3	4	3	5	4	3	3	3	3	3	2	2	2	2	2	2	1	2	2	2	2	1	1	1	1	1	3	1	1	2

Source: Competitive matches
A = Away; H = Home; W = Win; D = Draw; L = Loss

== Matches ==
=== Prva HNL ===
Round	Date	Venue	Opponent	Score	Attendance	Rijeka Scorers	Report
1	9 Aug	A	Cibalia	2 – 1	3,000	Musa (2)	HRnogomet.com
2	16 Aug	H	Slaven Belupo	1 – 1	3,000	Musa	HRnogomet.com
3	23 Aug	A	Varteks	1 – 0	5,000	Budan	HRnogomet.com
4	30 Aug	A	Osijek	0 – 1	2,500		HRnogomet.com
5	13 Sep	H	Zagreb	1 – 0	4,000	Čačić	HRnogomet.com
6	20 Sep	A	Hajduk Split	1 – 3	6,000	Musa	HRnogomet.com
7	27 Sep	H	Šibenik	3 – 1	2,000	Musa, Mijatović, Ivančić	HRnogomet.com
8	4 Oct	A	Zadarkomerc	1 – 0	2,000	Sztipánovics	HRnogomet.com
10	24 Oct	AR	Hrvatski Dragovoljac	0 – 1	1,000		HRnogomet.com
11	31 Oct	H	Mladost 127	1 – 0	1,500	Musa	HRnogomet.com
12	7 Nov	H	Cibalia	2 – 0	2,000	Sztipánovics, Musa	HRnogomet.com
9	11 Nov	H	Croatia Zagreb	1 – 0	10,000	Ivančić	HRnogomet.com
13	15 Nov	A	Slaven Belupo	3 – 1	1,000	Musa, Čačić, Sztipánovics	HRnogomet.com
14	22 Nov	H	Varteks	3 – 2	2,500	Sztipánovics (2), Musa	HRnogomet.com
15	29 Nov	H	Osijek	1 – 0	6,000	Balaban	HRnogomet.com
17	13 Dec	H	Hajduk Split	2 – 1	15,000	Hasančić (2)	HRnogomet.com
16	17 Feb	A	Zagreb	2 – 1	2,500	Sztipánovics (2)	HRnogomet.com
18	21 Feb	A	Šibenik	1 – 0	3,000	Milinović	HRnogomet.com
19	28 Feb	H	Zadarkomerc	4 – 1	10,000	Agić, Hasančić, Musa, Sztipánovics	HRnogomet.com
20	7 Mar	A	Croatia Zagreb	0 – 3	20,000		HRnogomet.com
21	14 Mar	H	Hrvatski Dragovoljac	3 – 0	8,000	Musa, Hasančić, Sztipánovics	HRnogomet.com
22	21 Mar	A	Mladost 127	2 – 1	3,500	Hasančić, Musa	HRnogomet.com
23	17 Apr	H	Varteks	2 – 1	5,000	Pilipović (2)	HRnogomet.com
24	21 Apr	A	Croatia Zagreb	1 – 0	3,000	Balaban	HRnogomet.com
25	25 Apr	H	Hrvatski Dragovoljac	3 – 0	10,000	Sztipánovics (2), Musa	HRnogomet.com
26	2 May	H	Hajduk Split	3 – 3	20,000	Hasančić, Balaban, Sztipánovics	HRnogomet.com
27	9 May	A	Osijek	2 – 5	2,500	Hasančić, Balaban	HRnogomet.com
28	12 May	A	Varteks	1 – 1	4,000	Hasančić	HRnogomet.com
29	16 May	H	Croatia Zagreb	0 – 2	15,000		HRnogomet.com
30	19 May	AR	Hrvatski Dragovoljac	2 – 1	1,500	Sztipánovics, Čačić	HRnogomet.com
31	23 May	A	Hajduk Split	3 – 1	40,000	Čačić, Hasančić, Sztipánovics	HRnogomet.com
32	26 May	H	Osijek	1 – 1	22,000	Musa	HRnogomet.com

Source: HRnogomet.com

=== Croatian Cup ===
Round	Date	Venue	Opponent	Score	Attendance	Rijeka Scorers	Report
R1	9 Sep	A	Halubjan	2 – 1	1,000	Musa, Budan	HRnogomet.com
R2	23 Sep	A	Cibalia	0 – 1	500		HRnogomet.com

Source: HRnogomet.com

=== Squad statistics ===
Competitive matches only.
Appearances in brackets indicate numbers of times the player came on as a substitute.

Name	Apps	Goals	Apps	Goals	Apps	Goals
Name	League		Cup		Total	
(Croatia) Đoni Tafra	32 (0)	0	2 (0)	0	34 (0)	0
(Croatia) Mladen Ivančić	28 (0)	2	2 (0)	0	30 (0)	2
(Croatia) Damir Milinović	30 (0)	1	1 (0)	0	31 (0)	1
(Croatia) Andre Mijatović	28 (0)	1	2 (0)	0	30 (0)	1
(Croatia) Dalibor Višković	28 (0)	0	1 (1)	0	29 (1)	0
(Croatia) Jasmin Agić	19 (5)	1	1 (1)	0	20 (6)	1
(Croatia) Božidar Čačić	22 (0)	4	1 (0)	0	23 (0)	4
(Croatia) Renato Pilipović	27 (1)	2	2 (0)	0	29 (1)	2
(Croatia) Goran Brajković	16 (9)	0	2 (0)	0	18 (9)	0
(Bosnia and Herzegovina) Admir Hasančić	23 (4)	9	0 (0)	0	23 (4)	9
(Croatia) Igor Musa	30 (0)	14	2 (0)	1	32 (0)	15
(Hungary) Barnabás Sztipánovics	24 (2)	14	0 (0)	0	24 (2)	14
(Croatia) Mauro Tomišić	15 (5)	0	1 (0)	0	15 (5)	0
(Croatia) Boško Balaban	7 (16)	4	0 (2)	0	7 (18)	4
(Croatia) Igor Budan	16 (7)	1	2 (0)	1	18 (7)	2
(Croatia) Ilija Kljajić	2 (5)	0	2 (0)	0	4 (5)	0
(Croatia) Kristijan Čaval	4 (2)	0	1 (0)	0	5 (2)	0
(Croatia) Dražen Bošković	1 (1)	0	0 (0)	0	1 (1)	0
(Croatia) Slađanko Marić	0 (2)	0	0 (1)	0	0 (3)	0
(Croatia) Mićo Peranović	0 (2)	0	0 (0)	0	0 (2)	0
(Croatia) Zdravko Šimić	0 (2)	0	0 (0)	0	0 (2)	0
(Japan) Yoshika Matsubara	0 (2)	0	0 (0)	0	0 (2)	0

== See also ==
- 1998–99 Prva HNL
- 1998–99 Croatian Cup
