= Igor Budan =

Croatian footballer (born 1980)

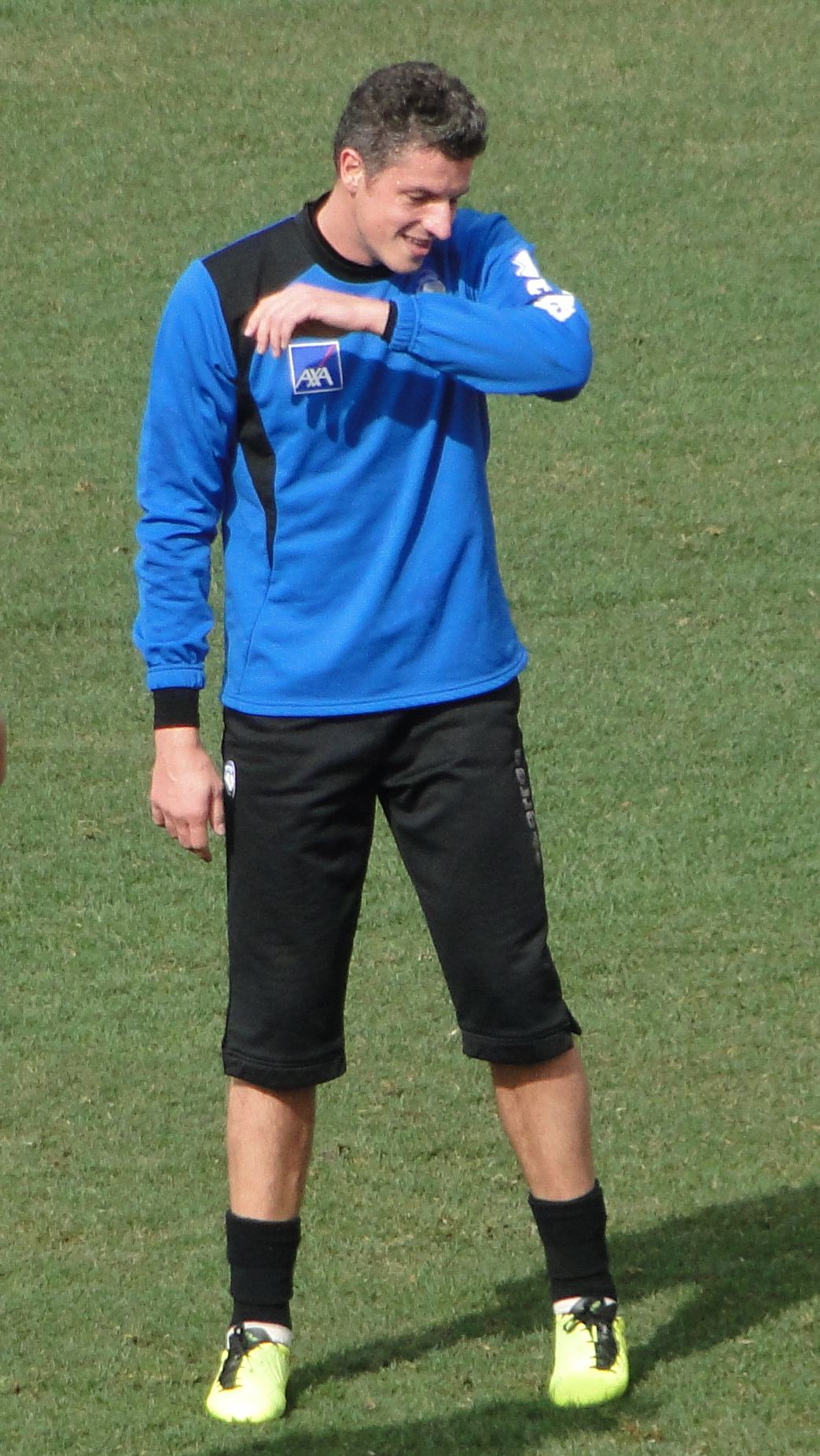

Personal information
- Date of birth: 22 April 1980 (age 46)
- Place of birth: Rijeka, SFR Yugoslavia
- Height: 1.85 m (6 ft 1 in)
- Position: Forward

Senior career*
Years	Team	Apps	(Gls)
1997–1999	Rijeka	33	(3)
1999–2002	Venezia	19	(2)
2000–2001	→ Empoli (loan)	5	(1)
2001	→ Bellinzona (loan)	1	(0)
2002–2003	Palermo	0	(0)
2002–2003	→ Venezia (loan)	7	(1)
2003	→ Ancona (loan)	15	(3)
2003–2006	Atalanta	51	(16)
2006	→ Ascoli (loan)	11	(4)
2006–2008	Parma	50	(20)
2008–2013	Palermo	63	(12)
2010–2011	→ Cesena (loan)	17	(1)
2013	→ Atalanta (loan)	2	(0)
Total		274	(63)

International career
1998–1999	Croatia U-18	8	(0)
1999	Croatia U-20	4	(0)
2007–2008	Croatia	6	(0)
- * Club domestic league appearances and goals

Igor Budan (born 22 April 1980) is a Croatian former professional footballer who played as a forward. He also represented the Croatia national football team at UEFA Euro 2008. Since leaving hometown club NK Rijeka, Budan spent most of the rest of his career playing for football clubs across Italy.

== Club career ==
=== Early career ===
Budan played for his native NK Rijeka for two seasons before moving to Italy in 1999. At that time Serie A imposed non-EU quota per team that each team could be used in the field. Budan spent 2000–01 season with Empoli as well as Swiss club Bellinzona (in Italian speaking region of Switzerland) in order to free the quota for other players. Budan was one of the players transferred to Palermo from Venezia in 2002. The ex-owner of Venezia, Maurizio Zamparini, had bought Palermo in July 2002.

=== Atalanta ===
He spent two very good seasons between 2003 and 2005 with Atalanta, where he was a regular. Atalanta excised the option to sign Budan in June 2004 but Palermo also excised the counter-option, however, the loan later extended. Atalanta signed Budan in co-ownership deal in summer 2005 for €1 million. Along with Adriano, they were part of the deal of Stephen Makinwa.

=== Parma ===
The co-ownership deal with Atalanta being terminated in June 2006 for €1 million, Budan was then loaned to Parma F.C. with a co-ownership option (€1.25 million), That season Palermo signed Mark Bresciano (€2.5 million) and Fábio Simplício (€4.6 million); Budan and Maurizio Ciaramitaro were the possible alternative compensation other than cash in the deals to Parma. Parma excised the option in June 2007 and bought Davide Matteini (50% for €900,00) and Francesco Parravicini (€950,000 to Palermo and €950,000 to Fiorentina) Budan scored a lesser goal in 2007–08 Serie A but with a better goal per game, Palermo bought back Budan for €4.5 million from relegated Parma in June 2008. Budan also signed a new five-year contract.

=== Return to Palermo ===
At Palermo, Budan opportunities to play were limited in the first season because of knee injuries and a surgery on his left knee.

However, he was confirmed to the Palermo squad for the 2009–10 season, and he started the new season by coming on as a substitute in the first two league games, against Napoli and Fiorentina. In the third game of the 2009–10 season, Budan scored his first goal for Palermo, a late injury-time equalizer in a 1–1 home tie against Bari. His new season with Palermo was then later stopped by another serious knee injury that kept him out of action for the remained of the tournament.

On 31 August 2010, he was loaned out to newly promoted Serie A club Cesena until the end of the season. He returned to Palermo by the end of the season and remained in Sicily due to the club failing to find a team for him. Initially kept off the first team squad, he was subsequently re-included due to an injury crisis and featured in a number of league games under head coach Devis Mangia, and then gaining a starting lineup spot under new boss Bortolo Mutti. His improved condition, together with the sale of Mauricio Pinilla to Cagliari, turned him into a starter and gave him the opportunity to play more continuously; he scored his first goal of the season on 22 January 2012, netting the 1–1 equalizer in a 5–3 home win against Genoa, that was followed by him scoring both goals in a 2–0 victory against Novara one week later. During 2011–12 season Budan also extended his contract with the club to 30 June 2015.

In January 2013 he moved on loan to Atalanta. After his loan expired, Budan confirmed his retirement in June 2013.

== International career ==
Budan was capped for the Croatian U-18 team at the 1998 UEFA European Under-18 Football Championship (now U-19 event) and the 1999 FIFA World Youth Championship (now FIFA U-20 World Cup). Budan also played in 1999 UEFA European Under-18 Football Championship qualification.

On 7 February 2007, Budan made his international debut for Croatia in a 2–1 friendly win against Norway, coming on as a 62nd-minute substitute for Boško Balaban.

Budan was selected for Croatia's Euro 2008 campaign, where he came on as a substitute in the second half against Austria. This would be Budan's final cap for Croatia.

== Post-playing career ==
After his retirement, Budan returned to Palermo with his family and successively confirmed he was about to join the rosanero staff as a team manager starting from the 2013–14 season, accepting an offer from president Maurizio Zamparini who had already regularly stated this intention in the past.

He left Palermo after one season to pursue a career as a director of football, accepting an offer to work as Guido Angelozzi's deputy at Serie B club Spezia. In July 2015 he was promoted as director of football, but on 17 November 2015, he relinquished his role as director of football for personal reasons.

== Career statistics ==
=== Club ===
Appearances and goals by club, season and competition
Club	Season	League			Cup		Europe		Total	
Club	Season	Division	Apps	Goals	Apps	Goals	Apps	Goals	Apps	Goals
HNK Rijeka	1997–98	Prva HNL	10	2	0	0	–		10	2
HNK Rijeka	1998–99	Prva HNL	23	1	2	1	–		25	2
HNK Rijeka	Total		33	3	2	1	0	0	35	4
Venezia	1999–2000	Serie A	16	2	4	0	–		20	2
Venezia	2001–02	Serie A	3	0	–		–		3	0
Venezia	2002–03	Serie B	7	1	0	0	–		7	1
Venezia	Total		26	3	4	0	0	0	30	3
Empoli (loan)	2000–01	Serie B	5	1	–		–		5	1
Bellinzona (loan)	2000–01	Nationalliga B	1	0	–		–		1	0
Palermo	2002–03	Serie A	0	0	0	0	–		0	0
Ancona (loan)	2002–03	Serie B	15	3	–		–		15	3
Atalanta	2003–04	Serie B	23	11	0	0	–		23	11
Atalanta	2004–05	Serie A	28	5	4	1	–		32	6
Atalanta	2005–06	Serie B	8	0	1	0	–		9	0
Atalanta	Total		59	16	5	1	0	0	64	17
Ascoli (loan)	2005–06	Serie A	11	4	–		–		11	4
Parma	2006–07	Serie A	35	13	0	0	3	3	38	16
Parma	2007–08	Serie A	15	7	1	0	–		16	7
Parma	Total		50	20	1	0	3	3	54	23
Palermo	2008–09	Serie A	5	0	0	0	–		5	0
Palermo	2009–10	Serie A	30	5	1	2	–		31	7
Palermo	2010–11	Serie A	0	0	–		0	0	0	0
Palermo	2011–12	Serie A	22	6	1	0	–		23	6
Palermo	2012–13	Serie A	6	1	1	0	–		7	1
Palermo	Total		63	12	3	2	0	0	66	14
Cesena (loan)	2010–11	Serie A	17	1	0	0	–		17	1
Atalanta (loan)	2012–13	Serie A	2	0	–		–		2	0
Career total			274	63	15	4	3	3	292	70

=== International ===
Appearances and goals by national team and year
National team	Year	Apps	Goals
Croatia	2007	3	0
Croatia	2008	3	0
Total		6	0
