= Dzafič =

Dzafič or Džafić is a surname. Notable people with the surname include:

- Adin Džafić (born 1989), Bosnian footballer
- Asmir Džafić (born 1970), Bosnian footballer
- Elvis Džafić (born 1990), Slovenian footballer
- Emir Dzafič (born 1972), Slovenian footballer
