= Renato Pilipović =

Croatian footballer and manager

Personal information
- Full name: Renato Pilipović
- Date of birth: 14 January 1977 (age 49)
- Place of birth: Rijeka, SR Croatia, SFR Yugoslavia
- Height: 1.87 m (6 ft 2 in)
- Position: Midfielder

Team information
- Current team: Croatia U21 (assistant)

Senior career*
Years	Team	Apps	(Gls)
1995–1999	Rijeka	74	(3)
1999–2002	Dinamo Zagreb	59	(3)
2002–2003	Kärnten	19	(0)
2003–2004	NK Zagreb	23	(1)
2004–2005	Pula Staro Češko	3	(1)
2006–2010	Croatia Sesvete	93	(11)
Total		271	(19)

International career
1997–2000	Croatia U21	14	(3)
1999	Croatia	1	(0)

Managerial career
- 2019–: Croatia U21 (assistant)
- * Club domestic league appearances and goals

Renato Pilipović (born 14 January 1977) is a Croatian retired footballer who played as a midfielder. He is currently working as an assistant manager of the Croatia national under-21 team.

== Career ==
He was also capped for Croatia once at full international level in a friendly against Mexico in June 1999 and was a member of the Croatia under-21 squad which competed at the 2000 European Championship.

== Career statistics ==
Season	Club	League	League		Cup		Europe		Total	
Season	Club	League	Apps	Goals	Apps	Goals	Apps	Goals	Apps	Goals
1995–96	Rijeka	1. HNL	14	0	5	2	–		19	2
1996–97	Rijeka	1. HNL	7	0	1	0	–		8	0
1997–98	Rijeka	1. HNL	25	1	2	0	–		27	1
1998–99	Rijeka	1. HNL	28	2	2	0	–		30	2
1999–00	Dinamo Zagreb	1. HNL	19	0	3	2	–		22	2
2000–01	Dinamo Zagreb	1. HNL	22	0	7	3	4	2	33	5
2001–02	Dinamo Zagreb	1. HNL	18	3	3	1	4	0	25	4
2002–03	FC Kärnten	Red Zac First League	19	0	1	0	–		20	0
2003–04	NK Zagreb	1. HNL	23	1	–		–		23	1
2004–05	Pula Staro Češko	1. HNL	–		–		–		0	0
2005–06	Pula Staro Češko	1. HNL	3	1	–		–		3	1
2005–06	Croatia Sesvete	2. HNL (South)	24	8	–		–		24	8
2006–07	Croatia Sesvete	2. HNL	24	1	2	0	–		26	1
2007–08	Croatia Sesvete	2. HNL	26	2	2	0	–		28	2
2008–09	Croatia Sesvete	1. HNL	19	0	–		–		19	0
2009–10	Croatia Sesvete	1. HNL	7	0	2	0	–		9	0
Career total			278	21	30	8	8	2	316	31
Sources: 1, 2

== Honours ==
Rijeka

- Prva HNL
  - Runners-up (1): 1998-99

Dinamo Zagreb

- Prva HNL
  - Winner (1): 1999-00
  - Runners-up (1): 2000-01
- Croatian Cup
  - Winner (2): 2000-01, 2001-02
  - Runners-up (1): 1999-00

Croatia Sesvete

- Druga HNL
  - Winner (1): 2007-08
