= Dalibor Višković =

Croatian-Italian footballer and manager

Personal information
- Date of birth: 6 January 1977 (age 49)
- Place of birth: Koper, Yugoslavia
- Height: 1.78 m (5 ft 10 in)
- Position: Defender

Senior career*
Years	Team	Apps	(Gls)
1995–2002	Rijeka	156	(1)
2002–2005	Slaven Belupo	68	(1)
2005-2006	Hapoel Petah Tikva	26	(0)
2006–2007	Vicenza	15	(0)
2007–2008	DAC Dunajská Streda		
2008–2009	Pomorac Kostrena	28	(2)
2009	Medulin 1921	5	(0)
2010–2012	Sambonifacese	48	(0)
2012–2014	Novigrad	29	(0)
2014–2015	Buje	25	(0)

International career
1996	Croatia U20	2	(0)
1997–2000	Croatia U21	14	(0)
1999	Croatia B	1	(0)

Managerial career
- 2015-2022: Buje
- * Club domestic league appearances and goals

Dalibor Višković (born 6 January 1977) is a Croatian football manager and retired player who played as a defender. He also holds Italian citizenship.

== Club career ==
Višković joined Slaven Belupo in summer 2002 from Rijeka. After a spell in Israel he moved to Italy to play for Vicenza in summer 2006. On 1 February 2010, the former Vicenza player was signed by Sambonifacese.

== International career ==
Višković has capped for Croatia B against France B on 19 January 1999 and played at 2000 U21 EURO.

== Managerial career ==
Višković managed Buje for almost 7 years.

== Career statistics ==
Club performance			League		Cup		Continental		Total	
Season	Club	League	Apps	Goals	Apps	Goals	Apps	Goals	Apps	Goals
Croatia			League		Croatian Cup		Europe		Total	
1995–96	HNK Rijeka	Prva HNL	14	0	3	0	–		17	0
1996–97	HNK Rijeka	Prva HNL	22	0	2	0	–		24	0
1997–98	HNK Rijeka	Prva HNL	21	0	2	0	–		23	0
1998–99	HNK Rijeka	Prva HNL	28	0	2	0	–		30	0
1999–00	HNK Rijeka	Prva HNL	24	1	4	0	2	0	30	1
2000–01	HNK Rijeka	Prva HNL	24	0	1	0	4	0	29	0
2001–02	HNK Rijeka	Prva HNL	23	0	1	0	–		24	0
2002–03	Slaven Belupo	Prva HNL	13	1	2	0	0	0	15	1
2003–04	Slaven Belupo	Prva HNL	18	0	2	0	–		20	0
2004–05	Slaven Belupo	Prva HNL	28	0	3	0	6	1	37	1
2005–06	Slaven Belupo	Prva HNL	9	0	4	0	6	0	19	0
Israel			League		State Cup		Europe		Total	
2005–06	Hapoel Petah Tikva	Premier League	26	0	–		–		26	0
Italy			League		Coppa Italia		Europe		Total	
2006–07	Vicenza	Serie B	15	0	0	0	–		15	0
Croatia			League		Croatian Cup		Europe		Total	
2008–09	Pomorac Kostrena	Druga HNL	28	2	4	0	–		32	2
2009–10	Medulin 1921	Treća HNL (West)	5	0	–		–		5	0
Italy			League		Coppa Italia		Europe		Total	
2010–11	A.C. Sambonifacese	Lega Pro Seconda Divisione	24	0	–		–		24	0
2011–12	A.C. Sambonifacese	Serie D	24	0	–		–		24	0
Croatia			League		Croatian Cup		Europe		Total	
2012–13	Novigrad	Treća HNL (West)	7	0	–		–		7	0
2013–14	Novigrad	Treća HNL (West)	22	0	2	0	–		24	0
2014–15	NK Buje	MŽNL NS Rijeka	25	0	–		–		25	0
HNK Rijeka total			156	1	15	0	6	0	177	1
Slaven Belupo total			68	1	11	0	12	1	91	1
Career total			400	4	32	0	18	1	450	5

== Honours ==
=== Manager ===
NK Buje

- Istrian Super Cup: 2019
- Istrian Football Cup: 2018–19
