= Mladen Ivančić (footballer) =

Croatian footballer

Personal information
- Date of birth: 8 February 1970 (age 56)
- Place of birth: Rijeka, SFR Yugoslavia
- Height: 1.87 m (6 ft 2 in)
- Position: Centre-back

Youth career
- Rijeka

Senior career*
Years	Team	Apps	(Gls)
1992–1993	Orijent		
1993–1994	Rudar Labin		
1994–1999	Rijeka	127	(7)
1999–2000	Austria Wien	16	(0)
2001–2003	Rijeka	26	(0)

Managerial career
- 2005–2006: Rijeka (assistant manager)
- 2006–2007: Rijeka U19
- 2007–2008: Rijeka (assistant manager)
- 2008: Rijeka
- 2012: Rijeka (assistant manager)
- * Club domestic league appearances and goals

Mladen Ivančić (born 8 February 1970) is a Croatian former professional footballer who played as a centre-back. As a player, he spent seven seasons with Rijeka in Croatia’s Prva HNL. He also spent a season playing for Austria Wien. He retired from football in 2003 and has become a manager. He was Rijeka manager in 2008.

== Career statistics ==
Appearances and goals by club, season and competition
Season	Club	League			Cup		Europe		Total	
Season	Club	Division	Apps	Goals	Apps	Goals	Apps	Goals	Apps	Goals
Orijent Rijeka	1992–93	2. HNL (South)	–		1	0	–		1	0
Rudar Labin	1993–94	2. HNL (South)	–		–		–		0	0
Rijeka	1994–95	1. HNL	20	0	5	0	–		25	0
Rijeka	1995–96	1. HNL	25	0	4	0	–		29	0
Rijeka	1996–97	1. HNL	24	2	2	1	–		26	3
Rijeka	1997–98	1. HNL	30	3	2	1	–		32	4
Rijeka	1998–99	1. HNL	28	2	2	0	–		30	2
Rijeka	Total		127	7	15	2	0	0	142	9
Austria Wien	1999–00	Austrian Bundesliga	16	0	2	0	3	0	21	0
Rijeka	2001–02	1. HNL	12	0	2	0	–		14	0
Rijeka	2002–03	1. HNL	14	0	1	0	2	0	17	0
Rijeka	Total		26	0	3	0	2	0	31	0
Career total			169	7	21	2	5	0	195	9

== Managerial statistics ==
As of 14 October 2018

Managerial record by team and tenure
Team	From	To	Record				
Team	From	To	P	W	D	L	Win %
HNK Rijeka	7 July 2008	8 October 2008	10	5	2	3	50.0
Total			10	5	2	3	50.0
