= Yves Belle-Belle =

Cameroonian footballer (born 1973)

Personal information
- Date of birth: 8 June 1973 (age 53)
- Position: Forward

Senior career*
Years	Team	Apps	(Gls)
1995–1996	HNK Rijeka		
1998–1999	Melaka United		
1999–2000	TSF Ditzingen	5	(0)

International career
1989–1992	Cameroon	7	(3)
- * Club domestic league appearances and goals

Yves Belle-Belle (born 8 June 1973) is a Cameroonian former professional footballer who played as a forward. (Note: Yves Belle-Belle at WorldFootball.net)

Belle-Belle won seven caps for the Cameroon national team and scored three goals. (Note: Yves Belle-Belle at National-Football-Teams.com) He made his debut in 1989 in a World Cup qualifier against Gabon. Second, he scored Cameroon's only goal in the 6–1 away defeat to Norway in October 1990. He then scored again in a 1992 African Cup of Nations qualification 1–1 draw against Sierra Leone.

On the club level he featured for HNK Rijeka in the 1995–96 season, Malaysian outfit Melaka United in 1998–99 and German minnows TSF Ditzingen in 1999–2000.
