= 2002–03 NK Dinamo Zagreb season =

Dinamo Zagreb
2002–03 season
- President: Mirko Barišić
- Manager: Miroslav Blažević
- 1. HNL: 1st (7th title)
- Croatian Cup: Round of 16
- UEFA Cup: Second round
- Top goalscorer: Ivica Olić (16)

This article shows statistics of individual players for the football club Dinamo Zagreb It also lists all matches that Dinamo Zagreb played in the 2002–03 season.

== Squad ==
(Correct as of November 2002)

Note: Flags indicate national team as defined under FIFA eligibility rules; some limited exceptions apply. Players may hold more than one non-FIFA nationality.

No.	Pos.	Nation	Player
1	GK	(Croatia) CRO	Tomislav Butina
2	DF	(Croatia) CRO	Dario Smoje
4	DF	(North Macedonia) MKD	Goce Sedloski
5	DF	(Croatia) CRO	Kristijan Polovanec
6	DF	(Slovenia) SVN	Boštjan Cesar
7	MF	(Croatia) CRO	Silvio Marić
8	MF	(Croatia) CRO	Jasmin Agić
9	FW	(Croatia) CRO	Ivica Olić
10	MF	(Bosnia and Herzegovina) BIH	Edin Mujčin
11	FW	(Croatia) CRO	Dario Zahora
12	GK	(Croatia) CRO	Ivan Turina

No.	Pos.	Nation	Player
14	MF	(Bosnia and Herzegovina) BIH	Mario Jurić
17	MF	(Croatia) CRO	Damir Krznar
18	FW	(Croatia) CRO	Vladimir Petrović
19	MF	(Croatia) CRO	Niko Kranjčar
20	FW	(Romania) ROU	Dumitru Mitu
21	FW	(Bosnia and Herzegovina) BIH	Enes Mešanović
22	DF	(Bosnia and Herzegovina) BIH	Spomenko Bošnjak
23	MF	(Croatia) CRO	Mihael Mikić
24	FW	(Croatia) CRO	Boško Balaban
26	DF	(Croatia) CRO	Dino Drpić

== Competitions ==
=== Overall ===
Competition	Started round	Final position / round	First match	Last Match
2002–03 Prva HNL	–	Champions	17 Jul 2002	31 May 2003
2002–03 Croatian Cup	First round	Round of 16	11 Sep 2002	4 Dec 2002
2002–03 UEFA Cup	First round	Second round	19 Sep 2002	14 Nov 2002

=== Prva HNL ===
==== Classification ====
Pos	Team	Pld	W	D	L	GF	GA	GD	Pts	Qualification
1	Dinamo Zagreb (C)	32	25	3	4	76	27	+49	78	Qualification to Champions League second qualifying round
2	Hajduk Split	32	22	4	6	56	22	+34	70	Qualification to UEFA Cup qualifying round
3	Varteks	32	18	3	11	52	38	+14	57	Qualification to UEFA Cup qualifying round
4	Kamen Ingrad	32	11	11	10	34	34	0	44	Qualification to UEFA Cup qualifying round
5	Cibalia	32	12	7	13	39	44	−5	43	Qualification to Intertoto Cup second round
6	NK Zagreb	32	9	9	14	40	52	−12	36	Qualification to Intertoto Cup first round

Source: RSSSF.org
Rules for classification: 1) points; 2) goal difference; 3) number of goals scored.
(C) Champions

==== Results summary ====
Overall								Home						Away					
Pld	W	D	L	GF	GA	GD	Pts	W	D	L	GF	GA	GD	W	D	L	GF	GA	GD
32	25	3	4	76	27	+49	78	13	2	1	42	11	+31	12	1	3	34	16	+18

==== Results by round ====
Round	1	2	3	4	5	6	7	8	9	10	11	12	13	14	15	16	17	18	19	20	21	22	23	24	25	26	27	28	29	30	31	32
Ground	A	A	H	A	H	A	H	A	H	A	H	H	H	A	H	A	H	A	H	A	H	A	H	H	A	H	A	A	A	H	A	H
Result	D	W	W	W	W	L	D	W	W	W	D	W	W	W	W	W	W	W	W	W	W	W	W	L	W	W	W	W	L	W	L	W
Position																																

Source: Competitive matches
A = Away; H = Home; W = Win; D = Draw; L = Loss

==== Results by opponent ====
Team	1–22		23–32		Points
Team	Home	Away	Home	Away	Points
Cibalia	4–1	1–1	3–0	2–3	7
Hajduk Split	2–1	0–1	0–1	1–4	3
Kamen Ingrad	1–1	1–0	1–0	2–0	10
Osijek	6–0	5–1	—	—	6
Pomorac Kostrena	2–1	3–2	—	—	6
Rijeka	2–1	1–0	—	—	6
Slaven Belupo	1–0	3–1	—	—	6
Šibenik	3–1	1–0	—	—	6
Varteks	3–1	2–0	5–1	3–0	12
Zadar	3–1	3–1	—	—	6
NK Zagreb	1–1	3–1	5–0	3–1	10

Source: 2002–03 Prva HNL article

== Matches ==
=== Competitive ===
M	Date	Tournament	Round	Ground	Opponent	Score	Attendance	Dinamo scorers	Report
01	27 Jul	1. HNL	1	A	Cibalia	1–1			
02	4 Aug	1. HNL	2	A	Osijek	5–1			
03	12 Aug	1. HNL	3	H	Slaven Belupo	1–0			
04	17 Aug	1. HNL	4	A	Pomorac Kostrena	3–2			
05	24 Aug	1. HNL	5	H	Zadar	3–1			
06	1 Sep	1. HNL	6	A	Hajduk Split	0–1			
07	11 Sep	Croatian Cup	First round	A	Hajduk Vela Luka	6–0			
08	14 Sep	1. HNL	7	H	NK Zagreb	1–1			
09	19 Sep	UEFA Cup	R1	H	Zalaegerszeg (Hungary)	6–0		Marić, Mitu, Olić, Polovanec, Petrović (2)	
10	22 Sep	1. HNL	8	A	Varteks	2–0			
11	28 Sep	1. HNL	9	H	Rijeka	2–1			
12	3 Oct	UEFA Cup	R1	A (Hungary)	Zalaegerszeg (Hungary)	3–1		Mitu, Olić, Mujčin	
13	6 Oct	1. HNL	10	A	Šibenik	1–0			
14	19 Oct	1. HNL	11	H	Kamen Ingrad	1–1			
15	26 Oct	1. HNL	12	H	Cibalia	4–1			
16	31 Oct	UEFA Cup	R2	H	Fulham (England)	0–3			
17	3 Nov	1. HNL	13	H	Osijek	6–0			
18	10 Nov	1. HNL	14	A	Slaven Belupo	3–1			
19	14 Nov	UEFA Cup	R2	A (England)	Fulham (England)	1–2		Olić	
20	17 Nov	1. HNL	15	H	Pomorac Kostrena	2–1			
21	24 Nov	1. HNL	16	A	Zadar	3–1			
22	1 Dec	1. HNL	17	H	Hajduk Split	2–1			
23	4 Dec	Croatian Cup	Round of 16	A	Kamen Ingrad	1–2			
24	22 Feb	1. HNL	18	A	NK Zagreb	3–1			
25	2 Mar	1. HNL	19	H	Varteks	3–1			
26	9 Mar	1. HNL	20	A	Rijeka	1–0			
27	15 Mar	1. HNL	21	H	Šibenik	3–1			
28	22 Mar	1. HNL	22	A	Kamen Ingrad	1–0			
29	6 Apr	1. HNL	23	H	NK Zagreb	5–0			
30	13 Apr	1. HNL	24	H	Hajduk Split	0–1			
31	19 Apr	1. HNL	25	A	Varteks	3–0			
32	26 Apr	1. HNL	26	H	Cibalia	3–0			
33	3 May	1. HNL	27	A	Kamen Ingrad	2–0			
34	7 May	1. HNL	28	A	NK Zagreb	3–1			
35	11 May	1. HNL	29	A	Hajduk Split	1–4			
36	17 May	1. HNL	30	H	Varteks	5–1			
37	24 May	1. HNL	31	A	Cibalia	2–3			
38	31 May	1. HNL	32	H	Kamen Ingrad	1–0			

Last updated 4 May 2002
