= Barnabás Sztipánovics =

Hungarian footballer

Personal information
- Date of birth: 2 July 1974 (age 52)
- Place of birth: Siklós, Hungary
- Height: 1.88 m (6 ft 2 in)
- Position: Striker

Senior career*
Years	Team	Apps	(Gls)
1993–1994	Beremendi Epitok	23	(4)
1994–1997	Zalaegerszegi TE	60	(5)
1997–1998	Belišće	35	(20)
1998–2000	Rijeka	56	(19)
2000–2002	Maribor	43	(18)
2002–2003	APOEL	22	(10)
2003–2004	Olympiakos Nicosia	12	(4)
2004–2005	Pécsi MFC	9	(2)
2005–2007	Nyiregyhaza Spartacus	34	(20)
2007	Pécsi MFC	9	(2)
2007–2008	SK Asten	16	(8)
2008–2010	SV Molln	34	(29)
2010–2017	Siklósi FC		
2017–2020	Beremendi Építők		

International career
1999	Hungary	1	(0)
- * Club domestic league appearances and goals

Barnabás Sztipánovics (born 2 July 1974) is a Hungarian retired football player.

== Career ==
In the 1998–99 season, he shared the place of the scorer leader of the Croatian First Football League with his teammate from Rijeka, Igor Musa, both scoring 14 goals.

While playing for Maribor, he scored the decisive goal in the last match of the 2000–01 Slovenian First League season against Olimpija Ljubljana in Ljubljana to secure the fifth league title for Maribor.

== Honours ==
Maribor

- Slovenian PrvaLiga: 2000–01, 2001–02

APOEL

- Cypriot Super Cup: 2002

Nyiregyhaza Spartacus

- Nemzeti Bajnokság II: 2006–07
