= Zdravko Šimić =

Croatian footballer

Personal information
- Full name: Zdravko Šimić
- Date of birth: 8 September 1977 (age 49)
- Place of birth: Rijeka, Croatia
- Height: 1.81 m (5 ft 11 in)
- Position: Midfielder

Team information
- Current team: Sengkang Punggol
- Number: 10

Senior career*
Years	Team	Apps	(Gls)
1996–1999	Rijeka	49	(4)
1999–2004	Pomorac	131	(24)
2005	Sabah FA	15	(2)
2006–2007	Draga	28	(9)
2008	Sengkang Punggol		
2010	Opatija		
2011	Draga		
2011-2013	Opatija		

International career^{‡}
1991–1992	Croatia U-15	8	(3)
1993–1994	Croatia U-17	12	(3)
1995–1996	Croatia U-19	8	(1)
- * Club domestic league appearances and goals as of 21 May 2008 ‡ National team caps and goals as of 21 May 2008

Zdravko Šimić (born 8 September 1977) is a former Croatian footballer who plays as a midfielder for Sengkang Punggol of the Singapore S-League. He can play in both the defensive and offensive midfielder positions, and is the captain of his current club.

== Club career ==
Šimić started his senior footballing career in his native Croatia, playing for his local club HNK Rijeka.

He then moved to NK Pomorac where he became a more regular feature in the team's setup, helping them to win promotion to the Prva HNL (Croatian First Football League) in 2002.

In 2005, he was sold to then-Malaysian Super League club Sabah FA, where he could not help his club to avoid relegation, and in 2006, he returned home to Croatia to play for NK Draga.

Within two years, Šimić was on his way back to Southeast Asia, this time to Singapore where he is currently playing for Sengkang Punggol as a midfielder and its captain.

On 21 May 2008, Šimić scored his first goal for Sengkang against the Young Lions in dramatic fashion. He stepped up to take a penalty kick, subsequently blasting his effort over the bar, but the referee, Sukhbir Singh, ruled that the Cubs' defenders had stepped into the box before the kick was taken, and called for a retake. Šimić then scored from the spot on his second try. It was his first goal in the S.League, as well as Sengkang's first win in the season since it began.

== International career ==
Šimić had a short stint playing for the Under-15, Under-17 and Under-19 teams of the Croatia national team. There, he played alongside current Croatia national team stars Igor Tudor (Hajduk Split) and Dario Šimić (AS Monaco).
