= Boško Balaban =

Croatian footballer (born 1978)

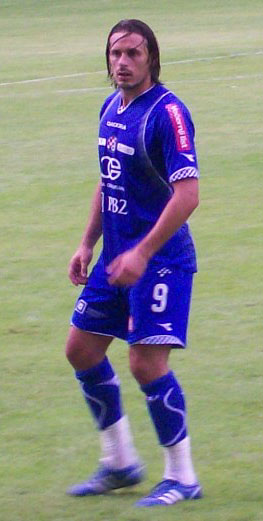
- Balaban playing for Dinamo Zagreb in 2008

Personal information
- Full name: Boško Balaban
- Date of birth: 15 October 1978 (age 48)
- Place of birth: Rijeka, SR Croatia, SFR Yugoslavia
- Height: 1.83 m (6 ft 0 in)
- Position: Striker

Senior career*
Years	Team	Apps	(Gls)
1995–2000	Rijeka	97	(21)
2000–2001	Dinamo Zagreb	27	(14)
2001–2003	Aston Villa	8	(0)
2002–2003	→ Dinamo Zagreb (loan)	24	(15)
2003–2007	Club Brugge	118	(58)
2007–2009	Dinamo Zagreb	37	(17)
2009–2012	Panionios	54	(13)
2012–2015	Selangor	30	(12)
Total		398	(150)

International career
1994	Croatia U-15	3	(0)
1995	Croatia U-16	1	(0)
1995	Croatia U-17	2	(1)
1996	Croatia U-18	1	(0)
1996–1997	Croatia U-19	4	(0)
1996–1997	Croatia U-20	1	(1)
1997–2000	Croatia U-21	17	(4)
2000–2007	Croatia	35	(10)
- * Club domestic league appearances and goals

Boško Balaban (born 15 October 1978) is a Croatian former footballer who played as a striker. Balaban also played for the Croatia national team.

== Club career ==
=== Early career ===
Born in Rijeka, he started playing for local club HNK Rijeka and appeared in 97 matches between 1995 and 2000, scoring a total of 21 goals. During the 1999–2000 season, he was the top scorer of his team with 15 goals and attracted the attention of another Croatian club, Dinamo Zagreb. Playing for Dinamo, Balaban kept up his goalscoring form and once again became the league's top scorer with 14 goals in 25 games. Two games into the following season, he was signed by Aston Villa for a fee of £5.8 million, earning a £20,000-a-week contract.

=== Aston Villa ===
Balaban failed to find any form for Aston Villa, making just nine appearances, seven as a substitute, in two and a half years. He was loaned back to Dinamo Zagreb for the 2002–03 season, scoring 15 times in 24 appearances. In December 2003, Aston Villa released Balaban from his contract and he signed for Club Brugge on a free transfer.

Balaban is regularly cited as one of the worst Premier League signings of all time. In a 2019 interview with FourFourTwo, Balaban disputed this, arguing that Aston Villa never gave him an opportunity to play: "If you’re a club that throws big money at signings and then doesn’t let them actually play, the jokes should really be at your expense."

=== Club Brugge ===
In the 2004–05 season, Balaban scored 25 goals in 24 appearances for Club Brugge; in the 2005–06 season, he scored 27 goals in 30 games for Brugge. In August 2007, Balaban went back to Dinamo after Brugge had bought the top scorer François Sterchele. Balaban stated he would miss Brugge very much and he had a wonderful time at the club. He earned the nickname amongst Brugge fans of "Super Bosko", due to him scoring four times in one match and scoring at an average of 0.5 goals per match.

=== Dinamo Zagreb ===
During Balaban's time at Dinamo Zagreb, he had an incident with fascist salute, which he made to fans after scoring a goal against Inter Zapresic. He had to pay a fine of 100KN (around €14).

=== Panionios ===
In June 2009, Panionios signed Balaban on a three-year contract. Balaban scored eight goals and he was Panionios' first scorer for the Super League 2009–10.

=== Selangor FA ===
On 29 January 2012, Malaysian Super League team Selangor FA signed Balaban for an undisclosed fee. He debuted, and scored the winning goal in the game against league leaders Kelantan FA on 14 February 2012, Selangor winning 2–1.

After helping Selangor to qualify for the 2013 AFC Cup, Balaban's contract was not extended after a mutual agreement.

== International career ==
Balaban won 35 international caps for Croatia between 2000 and 2007, scoring ten goals. His debut came in a friendly match against Slovakia on 16 August 2000, after being a regular member of the Croatian under-21 team for more than a year. His debut proved successful, as he scored Croatia's only goal in a 1–1 draw.

Balaban excelled during Croatia's qualifying campaign for the 2002 FIFA World Cup, appearing in all eight matches and scored five goals, including a hat-trick against Latvia in a 4–1 victory on 24 March 2001. He was also in the Croatia squad at the final 2002 World Cup tournament, but spent all three group matches on the bench. He subsequently did not appear in any matches for Croatia between February 2003 and August 2004, missing the entire Euro 2004 qualifying campaign as well as the final tournament. He made his competitive comeback against Bulgaria on 9 October 2004 in the Croatia team's qualifying campaign for the 2006 FIFA World Cup and subsequently appeared in another four qualifying matches, scoring a brace against Iceland on 3 September 2005. He was also a squad member at the 2006 World Cup finals, but once again spent all three group matches on the bench.

In early September 2006, Croatia manager Slaven Bilić dropped Balaban, along with teammates Ivica Olić and Dario Srna, from the squad for their opening Euro 2008 qualifier against Russia because of a late-night party in a Zagreb disco. However, Balaban was the only one of the three players to return to the squad for the very next qualifier against Andorra one month later, which Croatia won 7–0. Coming on as a substitute an hour into the match, and with Croatia 5–0 up, Balaban subsequently scored the fastest-ever goal by a single player for the Croatia national team, scoring just 20 seconds after coming onto the pitch.

== Personal life ==
In November 2023, Balaban was jailed for one year after failing to pay child support to his ex-wife.

== Career statistics ==
=== Club ===
Appearances and goals by club, season and competition
Club	Season	League			Cup		League Cup		Continental		Total	
Club	Season	Division	Apps	Goals	Apps	Goals	Apps	Goals	Apps	Goals	Apps	Goals
HNK Rijeka	1995–96	Prva HNL	3	0	0	0	–		–		3	0
HNK Rijeka	1996–97	Prva HNL	19	1	1	0	–		–		20	1
HNK Rijeka	1997–98	Prva HNL	26	1	2	0	–		–		28	1
HNK Rijeka	1998–99	Prva HNL	23	4	2	0	–		–		25	4
HNK Rijeka	1999–2000	Prva HNL	29	16	3	1	–		2	0	34	17
HNK Rijeka	Total		100	22	8	1	0	0	2	0	110	23
Dinamo Zagreb	2000–01	Prva HNL	25	14	3	5	–		4	0	32	19
Dinamo Zagreb	2001–02	Prva HNL	2	1	0	0	–		0	0	2	1
Dinamo Zagreb	Total		27	15	3	5	0	0	4	0	34	20
Aston Villa	2001–02	Premier League	8	0	0	0	0	0	–		8	0
Dinamo Zagreb	2002–03	Prva HNL	24	15	2	3	0	0	4	0	30	18
Club Brugge	2003–04	Belgian First Division	0	0	0	0	0	0	0	0	0	0
Club Brugge	2004–05	Belgian First Division	22	9	3	0	1	0	8	4	34	13
Club Brugge	2005–06	Belgian First Division	30	13	1	0	1	1	8	3	40	17
Club Brugge	2006–07	Belgian First Division	29	16	6	4	–		5	3	40	23
Club Brugge	Total		83	40	10	4	2	1	21	10	116	55
Dinamo Zagreb	2007–08	Prva HNL	18	11	4	2	–		6	1	28	14
Dinamo Zagreb	2008–09	Prva HNL	13	6	3	4	–		9	2	25	12
Dinamo Zagreb	Total		31	17	7	6	0	0	15	3	53	26
Panionios	2009–10	Super League Greece	24	8	3	1	–		–		27	9
Panionios	2010–11	Super League Greece	26	4	1	0	–		–		27	4
Panionios	Total		50	12	4	1	0	0	0	0	54	13
Selangor FA	2012	Liga Super	20	12	2	1	8	4	–		27	9
Career total			343	133	35	21	10	5	46	13	434	172

=== International appearances ===
Croatia
Year	Apps	Goals
2000	3	1
2001	9	5
2002	2	0
2003	1	0
2004	3	0
2005	6	2
2006	6	2
2007	5	0
Total	35	10

=== International goals ===
#	Date	Venue	Opponent	Score	Result	Competition
1	16 August 2000	Tehelné pole, Bratislava, Slovakia	Slovakia	0–1	1–1	Friendly
2	24 March 2001	Gradski vrt, Osijek, Croatia	Latvia	1–0	4–1	2002 FIFA World Cup qualification
3	24 March 2001	Gradski vrt, Osijek, Croatia	Latvia	2–0	4–1	2002 FIFA World Cup qualification
4	24 March 2001	Gradski vrt, Osijek, Croatia	Latvia	3–0	4–1	2002 FIFA World Cup qualification
5	2 June 2001	Stadion Varteks, Varaždin, Croatia	San Marino	2–0	4–0	2002 FIFA World Cup qualification
6	6 June 2001	Skonto Stadions, Riga, Latvia	Latvia	0–1	0–1	2002 FIFA World Cup qualification
7	3 September 2005	Laugardalsvöllur, Reykjavík, Iceland	Iceland	1–1	1–3	2006 FIFA World Cup qualification
8	3 September 2005	Laugardalsvöllur, Reykjavík, Iceland	Iceland	1–2	1–3	2006 FIFA World Cup qualification
9	23 May 2006	Ernst Happel Stadion, Vienna, Austria	Austria	1–4	1–4	Friendly
10	7 October 2006	Maksimir Stadium, Zagreb, Croatia	Andorra	6–0	7–0	UEFA Euro 2008 qualifying

== Honours ==
Dinamo Zagreb

- Prva HNL: 2002–03, 2007–08
- Croatian Cup: 2000–01, 2007–08, 2008–09
- Croatian Super Cup: 2002

Club Brugge

- Belgian First Division: 2004–05
- Belgian Cup: 2003–04, 2006–07
- Belgian Supercup: 2005

Individual

- SN Yellow Shirt award: 2001
- Fastest goal scored for Croatia
- Malaysian League top goalscorer: 2012
