= 1997–98 Croatian First Football League =

1. HNL
- Season: 1997–98
- Dates: 3 August 1997 – 10 May 1998
- Champions: Croatia Zagreb; 4th Croatian title 8th domestic title
- Relegated: Samobor
- Champions League: Croatia Zagreb
- UEFA Cup: Hajduk Split; Osijek
- Cup Winners' Cup: Varteks
- Intertoto Cup: Hrvatski Dragovoljac
- Matches: 192
- Goals: 494 (2.57 per match)
- Best player: Mario Bazina
- Top goalscorer: Mate Baturina (19)
- Biggest home win: Zadarkomerc 6–0 Slaven Belupo
- Biggest away win: Samobor 0–6 NK Zagreb
- Highest scoring: Hrvatski Dragovoljac 6–2 Slaven Belupo; Varteks 2–6 Croatia Zagreb
- Average attendance: 3,602

The 1997–98 Croatian First Football League, also known as 1. HNL, was the seventh season of the Croatian top-level football league since its establishment in 1992.

== Teams ==
Locations of teams in 1997–98 Prva HNL

=== Stadia and personnel ===
Team	Manager^{1}	Location	Stadium	Capacity
Croatia Zagreb	(Croatia) Zlatko Kranjčar	Zagreb	Stadion Maksimir	37,168
Hajduk Split	(Croatia) Zoran Vulić	Split	Stadion Poljud	35,000
Hrvatski Dragovoljac	(Croatia) Ilija Lončarević	Velika Gorica	Stadion Radnik	8,000
Mladost 127	(Croatia) Vinko Begović	Suhopolje	Stadion Park	5,000
Osijek	(Croatia) Milan Đuričić	Osijek	Stadion Gradski vrt	19,500
Rijeka	(Croatia) Nenad Gračan	Rijeka	Stadion Kantrida	10,275
Samobor	(Croatia) Božidar Štefković	Samobor	Gradski stadion u Samoboru	5,000
Slaven Belupo	(Croatia) Nenad Lušić	Koprivnica	Gradski stadion u Koprivnici	4,000
Šibenik	(Croatia) Ivan Buljan	Šibenik	Stadion Šubićevac	8,000
Varteks	(Croatia) Dražen Besek	Varaždin	Stadion Varteks	10,800
Zadarkomerc	(Croatia) Ivan Katalinić	Zadar	Stadion Stanovi	5,860
NK Zagreb	(Croatia) Valentin Barišić	Zagreb	Stadion Kranjčevićeva	8,850

- ^{1} On final match day of the season, played on 10 May 1998.

== First stage ==
Pos	Team	Pld	W	D	L	GF	GA	GD	Pts	Qualification
1	Croatia Zagreb	22	15	4	3	46	18	+28	49	Qualification to championship group
2	Hajduk Split	22	13	4	5	36	20	+16	43	Qualification to championship group
3	NK Zagreb	22	12	5	5	35	23	+12	41	Qualification to championship group
4	Hrvatski Dragovoljac	22	10	6	6	31	18	+13	36	Qualification to championship group
5	Osijek	22	9	5	8	29	26	+3	32	Qualification to championship group
6	Zadarkomerc	22	8	4	10	25	24	+1	28	Qualification to championship group
7	Rijeka	22	5	11	6	20	24	−4	26	Qualification to relegation group
8	Varteks	22	6	6	10	24	32	−8	24	Qualification to relegation group
9	Slaven Belupo	22	6	5	11	20	43	−23	23 (Note: Head-to-head record: Slaven Belupo–Mladost 127 2–0, Mladost 127–Slaven Belupo 2–1.)	Qualification to relegation group
10	Mladost 127	22	6	5	11	17	24	−7	23	Qualification to relegation group
11	Samobor	22	6	4	12	23	35	−12	22	Qualification to relegation group
12	Šibenik	22	4	5	13	19	38	−19	17	Qualification to relegation group

Source: RSSSF.org
Rules for classification: 1st points; 2nd head-to-head points; 3rd head-to-head goal difference; 4th head-to-head away goals scored

=== Rounds 1–22 results ===
Home \ Away	CZG	HAJ	HRD	MLA	OSI	RIJ	SAM	SLA	ŠIB	VAR	ZAD	ZAG
Croatia Zagreb		2–0	1–1	1–0	2–0	2–0	3–1	4–1	1–0	2–1	3–1	3–0
Hajduk Split	1–0		1–0	3–2	2–2	2–1	2–1	3–0	3–0	2–0	1–2	2–1
Hrvatski Dragovoljac	2–1	3–1		2–1	2–1	3–0	0–0	6–2	2–1	0–1	0–0	0–0
Mladost 127	0–1	0–0	1–0		0–0	1–1	1–1	2–1	2–0	2–0	1–0	1–1
Osijek	2–2	1–0	1–0	1–0		2–0	2–0	2–2	3–1	1–0	2–0	1–3
Rijeka	1–1	1–1	1–0	2–0	1–1		0–0	1–0	3–1	1–1	1–1	2–1
Samobor	1–2	0–2	1–3	2–0	2–1	2–0		5–1	2–0	3–2	0–0	0–6
Slaven Belupo	1–1	0–3	0–3	2–0	2–1	0–0	1–0		1–0	2–0	2–1	0–2
Šibenik	1–3	1–4	1–0	0–1	4–3	1–1	2–0	0–0		1–1	1–1	2–1
Varteks	2–6	2–1	1–1	2–1	0–1	1–1	2–1	1–1	1–1		2–0	1–2
Zadarkomerc	2–1	0–1	1–2	2–1	2–1	1–0	4–1	6–0	1–0	0–2		0–1
NK Zagreb	0–4	1–1	1–1	2–0	1–0	2–2	1–0	2–1	4–1	2–1	1–0	

Source: RSSSF.org
Legend: Blue = home team win; Yellow = draw; Red = away team win.

== Championship group ==
Pos	Team	Pld	W	D	L	GF	GA	GD	Pts	Qualification
1	Croatia Zagreb (C)	10	7	3	0	28	10	+18	49	Qualification to Champions League second qualifying round
2	Hajduk Split	10	4	2	4	17	16	+1	36	Qualification to UEFA Cup second qualifying round
3	Osijek	10	5	1	4	13	12	+1	32	Qualification to UEFA Cup second qualifying round
4	Hrvatski Dragovoljac	10	4	2	4	7	12	−5	32	Qualification to Intertoto Cup first round
5	NK Zagreb	10	2	3	5	16	16	0	30	
6	Zadarkomerc	10	2	1	7	11	26	−15	21	

Source: RSSSF.org
Rules for classification: 1st points; 2nd head-to-head points; 3rd head-to-head goal difference; 4th head-to-head away goals scored
(C) Champions

=== Rounds 23–32 results ===
Home \ Away	CZG	HAJ	HRD	OSI	ZAD	ZAG
Croatia Zagreb		2–1	4–0	4–2	6–1	2–2
Hajduk Split	1–1		1–0	2–0	5–2	2–1
Hrvatski Dragovoljac	0–2	1–0		0–2	1–0	1–0
Osijek	1–1	2–0	1–2		2–1	1–0
Zadarkomerc	0–3	4–2	0–0	2–1		1–2
NK Zagreb	2–3	3–3	2–2	0–1	4–0	

Source: RSSSF.org
Legend: Blue = home team win; Yellow = draw; Red = away team win.

== Relegation group ==
Pos	Team	Pld	W	D	L	GF	GA	GD	Pts	Qualification or relegation
7	Rijeka	10	4	3	3	16	13	+3	28	
8	Šibenik	10	5	3	2	16	8	+8	27	
9	Slaven Belupo	10	5	0	5	11	13	−2	27	
10	Varteks	10	4	2	4	10	12	−2	26	Qualification to Cup Winners' Cup first round
11	Mladost 127 (O)	10	4	1	5	13	11	+2	25	Qualification to relegation play-off
12	Samobor (R)	10	3	1	6	11	20	−9	21	Relegation to Croatian Second Football League

Source: RSSSF.org
Rules for classification: 1st points; 2nd head-to-head points; 3rd head-to-head goal difference; 4th head-to-head away goals scored
(O) Play-off winners; (R) Relegated

=== Rounds 23–32 results ===
Home \ Away	MLA	RIJ	SAM	SLA	ŠIB	VAR
Mladost 127		3–1	2–0	2–0	1–1	2–1
Rijeka	3–2		1–1	4–1	0–0	4–1
Samobor	2–1	3–1		3–0	2–4	0–3
Slaven Belupo	1–0	1–0	3–0		2–1	2–0
Šibenik	1–0	0–1	4–0	2–1		1–1
Varteks	1–0	1–1	1–0	1–0	0–2	

Source: RSSSF.org
Legend: Blue = home team win; Yellow = draw; Red = away team win.

=== Relegation play-off ===
7 June 1998

Mladost 127	2–0	Segesta
Džafić 75'; Lončarević 89'	Report (p. 11)

Stadion Kranjčevićeva, Zagreb
Attendance: 1,500
Referee: Veljko Malovac (Rijeka)

== Statistics ==
- The top scorer was NK Zagreb's Mate Baturina, with 19 goals.
- The player of the year was Mario Bazina from NK Hrvatski Dragovoljac

=== Top goalscorers ===
Rank	Player	Club	Goals
1	(Croatia) Mate Baturina	NK Zagreb	19
2	(Croatia) Mario Bazina	Hrvatski Dragovoljac	12
2	(Croatia) Vladimir Petrović	Croatia Zagreb	12
4	(Croatia) Tomislav Erceg	Hajduk Split	11
4	(Bosnia and Herzegovina) Admir Hasančić	Rijeka	11
6	(Croatia) Petar Krpan	Osijek	10
7	(Croatia) Igor Cvitanović	Croatia Zagreb	9
7	(Croatia) Joško Popović	Šibenik	9
7	(Croatia) Klaudio Vuković	Samobor	9
10	(Australia) Mark Viduka	Croatia Zagreb	8

== Attendances ==
#	Club	Average
1	Croatia Zagreb	7,419
2	Hajduk	7,313
3	Zadar	4,656
4	Osijek	4,594
5	Mladost	3,281
6	Varteks	3,250
7	Slaven	2,975
8	Rijeka	2,619
9	Šibenik	2,294
10	Zagreb	1,706
11	Samobor	1,500
12	Hrvatski	1,169

== See also ==
- 1997–98 Croatian Second Football League
- 1997–98 Croatian Football Cup
