= Boško Anić =

Croatian footballer (born 1968)

Personal information
- Date of birth: 27 July 1968 (age 58)
- Place of birth: Trilj, SFR Yugoslavia
- Position: Defender

Youth career
- Junak Sinj

Senior career*
Years	Team	Apps	(Gls)
1985–1988	Junak Sinj		
1989	Split		
1989–1990	Borac (BL)	31	(2)
1991	Hajduk Split	6	(1)
1992	Šibenik	14	(0)
1993–1994	Zadar	1	(0)
1995–1996	Segesta	14	(1)
1996	Istra	11	(1)
1997	Rijeka	14	(2)
1997–1998	Hajduk Split	5	(0)
- * Club domestic league appearances and goals as of 7 March 2014

Boško Anić (born 27 July 1968) is a retired Croatian football defender who last played for Hajduk Split in Croatia's Prva HNL.

== Club career ==
As a professional footballer, he started with Borac Banja Luka in Yugoslav First League. During his professional career he spent most of his time playing for various clubs in Croatia's Prva HNL.
