= Asmir Džafić =

Bosnian footballer

Personal information
- Full name: Asmir Džafić
- Date of birth: 11 November 1970 (age 55)
- Place of birth: Mostar, SFR Yugoslavia
- Position: Striker

Senior career*
Years	Team	Apps	(Gls)
1995–1997	NK Zagreb	49	(5)
1998–1999	Mladost 127	29	(9)
1999–2001	Velež Mostar	42	(32)
2001–2002	Fortuna Düsseldorf	40	(3)
2002–2004	Velež Mostar	28+	(8+)
2004–2007	Troglav Livno		
2007–2008	Velež Mostar	12	(1)
2008–2010	Neretvanac		

International career^{‡}
1999-2000	Bosnia and Herzegovina	3	(0)

Managerial career
- 2010–2012: Neretvanac
- 2012: Velež Mostar
- 2017-2018: Željezničar (assistant)
- * Club domestic league appearances and goals ‡ National team caps and goals as of 13 June 2021

Asmir Džafić (born 11 November 1970) is a Bosnian retired football player.

== Playing career ==
=== International ===
Džafić made his debut for Bosnia and Herzegovina in an August 1999 friendly match away against Liechtenstein and has earned a total of 3 caps, scoring no goals. His final international was a March 2000 friendly away against Jordan.

== Managerial career ==
He was appointed manager of his former club Velež Mostar in April 2012, after a successful stint as coach of Neretvanac Opuzen. He was dismissed in September 2012. In summer 2017, he was named assistant to manager Admir Adžem at Željezničar.
