= Jasmin Samardžić =

Croatian footballer

Personal information
- Date of birth: 27 January 1974 (age 52)
- Place of birth: Rijeka, Croatia
- Height: 1.69 m (5 ft 6 1/2 in)
- Position: Forward

Youth career
- Rijeka

Senior career*
Years	Team	Apps	(Gls)
1992–1997	Rijeka	85	(7)
1997–1999	Eintracht Braunschweig	28	(0)
1999–2001	Orijent		
2001–2002	Pomorac	27	(4)
2002	Zagreb	8	(0)
2003–2004	Rijeka	41	(8)
2004–2005	Pomorac	16	(3)
2005–2006	Krk		
2007–2008	Draga		

International career
1994	Croatia U-21	1	(0)

Managerial career
- Krk
- Pomorac
- Lokomotiva
- Zamet
- * Club domestic league appearances and goals as of 13:51, 20 December 2013 (UTC)

Jasmin Samardžić (born 27 January 1974) is a Croatian retired football striker, who last played for Draga in Croatia’s lower divisions.

== Career ==
He had spent much of his career playing for various clubs in Croatia’s Prva HNL, including 124 league games for his hometown club Rijeka. He also had a two-year stint in Germany with Eintracht Braunschweig.

== Career statistics ==
Club performance			League		Cup		Continental		Total	
Season	Club	League	Apps	Goals	Apps	Goals	Apps	Goals	Apps	Goals
Croatia			League		Croatian Cup, Super Cup		Europe		Total	
1992	Rijeka	Prva HNL	3	0	1	0	—		4	0
1992–93	Rijeka	Prva HNL	10	0	3	0	—		13	0
1993–94	Rijeka	Prva HNL	27	3	5	0	—		32	3
1994–95	Rijeka	Prva HNL	25	1	6	4	—		31	5
1995–96	Rijeka	Prva HNL	14	2	5	1	—		19	3
1996–97	Rijeka	Prva HNL	6	1	1	0	—		7	1
Germany			League		DFB-Pokal		Europe		Total	
1997–98	Eintracht Braunschweig	Regionalliga Nord	27	0	—		—		27	0
1998–99	Eintracht Braunschweig	Regionalliga Nord	1	0	—		—		1	0
Croatia			League		Croatian Cup		Europe		Total	
1999–00	Orijent	Druga HNL	—		—		—		0	0
2000–01	Orijent	Druga HNL	—		1	0	—		1	0
2001–02	Pomorac	Prva HNL	27	4	3	1	—		30	5
2002–03	Zagreb	Prva HNL	8	0	1	1	2	0	11	1
2002–03	Rijeka	Prva HNL	14	3	—		—		14	3
2003–04	Rijeka	Prva HNL	27	5	4	3	—		31	8
2004–05	Pomorac	Druga HNL (South)	16	3	2	1	—		18	4
Country	Rijeka		126	15	25	8	0	0	151	23
Country	Pomorac		43	7	5	2	0	0	48	9
Country	Total			208	22	32	11	2	0	2|33
