= Mario Tokić =

Croatian footballer and manager

Personal information
- Date of birth: July 23, 1975 (age 51)
- Place of birth: Derventa, SR Bosnia and Herzegovina, Yugoslavia
- Height: 1.80 m (5 ft 11 in)
- Position: Defender

Senior career*
Years	Team	Apps	(Gls)
1992–1998	Rijeka	134	(5)
1998–2001	Dinamo Zagreb	64	(1)
2001–2005	Grazer AK	133	(4)
2005–2007	Austria Wien	60	(3)
2007–2009	Rapid Wien	43	(1)
2009–2011	NK Zagreb	36	(0)
Total		471	(13)

International career
1998–2006	Croatia	28	(0)

Managerial career
- 2016: Lokomotiva Zagreb
- 2016–2017: Lokomotiva Zagreb
- * Club domestic league appearances and goals

Mario Tokić (born 23 July 1975) is a Croatian football manager and former player.

He retired following the end of the 2010–11 season.

== Playing career ==
=== Club ===
Mario Tokić started his professional career in NK Rijeka in 1992. After six years, in 1998 he moved to Dinamo Zagreb. In 2001, he was transferred to the Austrian side Grazer AK, where he played until 2005, while at Grazer AK he scored what was called his best goal against Liverpool in a champions league qualifier, despite winning 1-0 Grazer AK still lost the tie 2–1 when he moved to Austria Wien. At the end of the 2006–07 season Tokić announced he would be joining Austria's arch rivals Rapid for the new season. In August 2009, after two seasons with Rapid, the club announced that the contract with Tokić was cancelled.

=== International ===
Tokić made his debut for Croatia in a September 1998 European Championship qualification match away against the Republic of Ireland, coming on as a 77th-minute substitute for Zvonimir Soldo, and earned a total of 28 caps, scoring no goals. Tokić was part of the Croatian squad at Euro 2004 and the 2006 World Cup, but did not play any games at either tournament. His final international was a June 2006 friendly match against Spain.

== Managerial career ==
On 6 July 2016, following the sacking of Valentin Barišić, Tokić was named manager of NK Lokomotiva Zagreb.

In December 2016 Tokić returning the manager of NK Lokomotiva Zagreb, only to be dismissed in December 2017.

== Career statistics ==
=== Club statistics ===
Club performance			League		Cup		League Cup		Continental		Total	
Season	Club	League	Apps	Goals	Apps	Goals	Apps	Goals	Apps	Goals	Apps	Goals
Croatia			League		Croatian Cup		Super Cup		Europe		Total	
1992-93	HNK Rijeka	Prva HNL	6	0	0	0	–	–	-	-	6	0
1993-94	HNK Rijeka	Prva HNL	16	0	4	0	–	–	-	-	20	0
1994-95	HNK Rijeka	Prva HNL	26	1	4	0	–	–	-	-	30	1
1995-96	HNK Rijeka	Prva HNL	34	1	5	1	–	–	-	-	39	2
1996-97	HNK Rijeka	Prva HNL	27	3	2	0	–	–	-	-	29	3
1997-98	HNK Rijeka	Prva HNL	25	0	1	0	–	–	-	-	26	0
1998-99	Dinamo Zagreb	Prva HNL	30	0	1	0	–	–	8	0	39	0
1999-00	Dinamo Zagreb	Prva HNL	25	1	8	0	–	–	6	0	39	1
2000-01	Dinamo Zagreb	Prva HNL	9	0	4	0	–	–	1	0	14	0
Austria			League		ÖFB Cup		Super Cup		Europe		Total	
2001-02	Grazer AK	Austrian Bundesliga	30	0	4	0	–	–	3	1	37	1
2002-03	Grazer AK	Austrian Bundesliga	34	0	4	0	1	0	7	1	42	1
2003-04	Grazer AK	Austrian Bundesliga	35	4	4	0	-	-	4	0	42	4
2004-05	Grazer AK	Austrian Bundesliga	34	0	3	0	1	0	10	1	48	1
2005-06	Austria Wien	Austrian Bundesliga	29	2	1	0	-	-	4	0	34	2
2006-07	Austria Wien	Austrian Bundesliga	31	0	4	0	-	-	6	0	41	0
2007-08	Rapid Wien	Austrian Bundesliga	22	1	0	0	-	-	5	0	27	1
2008-09	Rapid Wien	Austrian Bundesliga	21	0	2	0	1	0	2	0	26	0
Croatia			League		Croatian Cup		Super Cup		Europe		Total	
2009-10	NK Zagreb	Prva HNL	12	0	0	0	–	–	-	-	12	0
2010-11	NK Zagreb	Prva HNL	25	0	3	0	–	–	-	-	28	0
Country	Croatia		235	3	19	1	0	0	15	0	270	3
Country	Austria		246	7	22	0	3	0	41	3	312	12
Total			481	10	41	1	2	0	56	3	581	14

=== International appearances ===
Croatia national team
Year	Apps	Goals
1998	2	0
1999	2	0
2000	0	0
2001	2	0
2002	3	0
2003	1	0
2004	7	0
2005	5	0
2006	7	0
Total	28	0

== Honours ==
Dinamo Zagreb

- Prva HNL: 1998-99, 1999-00
- Croatian Cup: 2001

Grazer AK

- Austrian Bundesliga: 2003-04
- ÖFB Cup: 2002, 2004
- Austrian Super Cup: 2002

Austria Wien

- Austrian Bundesliga: 2005-06
- ÖFB Cup: 2006, 2007

Rapid Wien

- Austrian Bundesliga: 2007-08
- Austrian Super Cup: 2008
- UEFA Intertoto Cup: 2007
