= NK Draga =

Croatian football club

- Full name: Nogometni klub Draga
- Founded: 1924; 101 years ago
- Ground: Slatina
- Capacity: 1,000
- League: Primorje-Gorski Kotar 1st County League
- 2010–11: Primorje-Gorski Kotar 1st County League, 13th

NK Draga is a Croatian football club from Mošćenička Draga on the Croatian coast. The team won the Treća HNL West Division in 2003–04.

== Honours ==
(Croatia) Treća HNL – West:

- Winners (1): 2003–04
