= Stjepan Ostojić (footballer) =

Croatian footballer

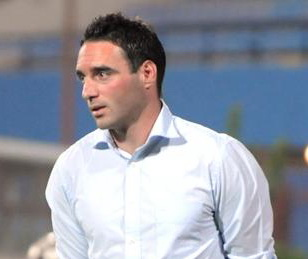

Personal information
- Date of birth: 7 May 1975 (age 51)
- Place of birth: Rijeka, SFR Yugoslavia
- Position: Midfielder

Youth career
- Orijent

Senior career*
Years	Team	Apps	(Gls)
1994–1995	Orijent		
1995–1997	Rijeka	44	(1)
1997–1999	Leoben	45	(7)
2001	Rijeka	5	(0)
2001–2005	Pomorac	82	(10)
2005–2006	Krk		

Managerial career
- 2008: Rijeka (caretaker)
- 2016–2017: Genoa (assistant)
- 2019–2021: Hellas Verona (assistant)
- * Club domestic league appearances and goals

Stjepan Ostojić (born 7 May 1975) is a Croatian former footballer who played as a midfielder.

== Playing career ==
During his professional career he mainly played for Rijeka in Croatia's Prva HNL and for Pomorac. He also spent two seasons with Leoben in Austria.

== Managerial career ==
Following his retirement from professional football, he became a manager. He managed several youth teams on the Arabian Peninsula, Rijeka, as an interim coach, Pomorac and Krk. He also worked as an assistant to manager Ivan Jurić at Hellas Verona and Genoa. In January 2025, he followed Jurić to Southampton as a fitness coach.
