= Borimir Perković =

Croatian footballer and manager

Personal information
- Date of birth: 25 September 1967 (age 59)
- Place of birth: Livno, SFR Yugoslavia
- Height: 1.71 m (5 ft 7 in)
- Position: Midfielder

Senior career*
Years	Team	Apps	(Gls)
1990–1991	NK Zagreb	23	(0)
1992–1994	Inker Zaprešić	75	(13)
1994–1997	Rijeka	67	(16)
1997–1999	Osijek	39	(13)
2002	Slaven Belupo	11	(1)
2003	Kamen Ingrad	15	(1)
2003–2004	NK Zagreb	30	(2)
Total		371	(62)

Managerial career
- 2008–2010: Inter Zaprešić
- 2010–2012: Al-Faisaly (assistant)
- 2012–2013: Inter Zaprešić
- 2014–2017: Al-Ain (assistant)
- 2017–2019: Šibenik
- 2019: Varaždin
- 2021–2022: Inter Zaprešić
- 2023: Osijek
- * Club domestic league appearances and goals

Borimir Perković (born 25 September 1967) is a Croatian professional football manager and former player.

During his club career, he played for numerous clubs in Croatia, collecting over 300 caps and scoring over 50 goals. Although a versatile and talented midfielder, Perković never earned a cap for the Croatia national team.

== Managerial career ==
Perković started as manager with Inter Zaprešić in 2008, later moving to Saudi Arabia, at Al-Faisaly, with Zlatko Dalić, who was named as the head coach. In 2012 he came back to Croatia and was named the manager of Inter Zaprešić again. In 2014, again with Dalić, he moved to United Arab Emirates at Al-Ain. The club reached the final game of the AFC Champions League in 2016, which they lost.

On 30 August 2017, Perković was appointed the head coach of Croatian Second Football League club HNK Šibenik. In his first season with the club based on Croatian coast, he finished in 7th in the league. On 5 June 2019, two days after Šibenik lost to Istra 1961 in two qualification games for the qualification for the first tier, he terminated the contract with the club.

On 22 June 2019, Perković was named the new manager of Prva HNL club Varaždin. On 8 October 2019, he was sacked by the club, following a series of defeats in the league.

Perković was left without a club in summer 2022 after leaving Inter Zaprešić.

== Honours ==
=== Player ===
Inker Zaprešić

- Croatian Cup: 1992

Osijek

- Croatian Cup: 1999

=== Manager ===
Šibenik

- Croatian Second League runner-up: 2018–19
