= Igor Benedejčič =

Slovenian footballer and manager

Personal information
- Date of birth: 28 July 1969 (age 57)
- Place of birth: Koper, SR Slovenia, SFR Yugoslavia
- Height: 1.80 m (5 ft 11 in)
- Position: Midfielder

Youth career
- Koper

Senior career*
Years	Team	Apps	(Gls)
1990	Koper		
1991	Alpine Donawitz	5	(0)
1991–1992	Koper	33	(5)
1992–1997	Olimpija	99	(19)
1997–1998	Rijeka	31	(2)
1998–1999	Korotan Prevalje	16	(0)
1999–2004	Koper	76	(11)

International career
1992–1998	Slovenia	8	(1)

Managerial career
- 2004: Koper
- 2008–2009: Interblock
- 2013–2014: Slovenia U17
- 2015–2017: Slovenia U18/U19
- 2018: Slovenia U16/U17
- 2018: Slovenia (caretaker)
- * Club domestic league appearances and goals

Igor Benedejčič (born 28 July 1969) is a Slovenian retired football manager and player who played as a midfielder.

Benedejčič was capped for the Slovenia national team. In 1992, he scored Slovenia's first ever international goal in the nation's debut match against Estonia.

== International career ==
In 1992, Benedejčič became the first player to score for Slovenia in an official international match when he scored the equaliser in a friendly match against Estonia in Tallinn, a game which finished 1–1. He played a total of 8 matches for the national team, scoring 1 goal.
