= Davor Dželalija =

Croatian footballer and manager

Personal information
- Date of birth: 26 February 1968 (age 58)
- Place of birth: Šibenik, SR Croatia, Yugoslavia
- Height: 1.85 m (6 ft 1 in)
- Position: Forward

Senior career*
Years	Team	Apps	(Gls)
1982-1984	Zagora Unešić	40	(34)
1984-1986	Dalmatinac	30	(13)
1986-1989	Mosor	53	(13)
1989–1991	Šibenik	36	(4)
1991	RNK Split	12	(3)
1992–1994	Orijent	54	(33)
1994–1997	Rijeka	64	(14)
1997	Orijent	13	(5)
1997–1998	Toledo	29	(4)
1998	Orijent	9	(4)
1999-2000	Jadran Poreč	33	(18)
2000	Orijent	17	(7)
2000-2001	Tanjong Pagar	22	(21)
2001-2002	Pomorac	25	(9)

Managerial career
- 2003-2014: Orijent
- 2014-2017: Krk
- 2019-2021: Krk
- 2021-2023: Pomorac
- 2023-2024: Naprijed
- 2024-2025: Krk
- * Club domestic league appearances and goals

Davor Dželalija (born 26 February 1968) is a Croatian retired footballer and most recently manager of NK Krk.

== Playing career ==
=== Club ===
During his club career he played for numerous clubs in Croatia and has also had two years with Toledo in Spain, where he played alongside Unai Emery, and a year in Singapore. In Croatia, he was HNK Rijeka's top scorer during the 1994–95 season.

== Managerial career ==
After spending eleven years coaching various age groups at Orijent, he successfully managed at third tier-club NK Krk. He was rehired by them in June 2019 but in April 2021 left by mutual consent.
