= Sebastjan Cimirotič =

Slovenian footballer (born 1974)

Personal information
- Date of birth: 14 September 1974 (age 52)
- Place of birth: Ljubljana, SFR Yugoslavia
- Height: 1.86 m (6 ft 1 in)
- Position: Forward

Team information
- Current team: Slovan (head coach)

Youth career
- Slovan

Senior career*
Years	Team	Apps	(Gls)
1991–1993	Slovan	26	(2)
1994–1996	Olimpija	54	(11)
1997	Rijeka	20	(4)
1998–2000	Hapoel Tel Aviv	69	(19)
2000–2001	Olimpija	30	(19)
2001–2003	Lecce	25	(3)
2004	Olimpija	26	(8)
2005	Celje	5	(3)
2005–2007	Incheon United	3	(1)
2006	→ Hajduk Split (loan)	5	(1)
2006–2007	→ Domžale (loan)	26	(10)
2007–2010	Olimpija Ljubljana	40	(17)
2011	Ljubljana	3	(2)
2012–2014	FC Hermagor	50	(24)
2017	FC St. Veit	5	(1)
Total		387	(125)

International career
1993–1995	Slovenia U21	12	(5)
1998–2005	Slovenia	33	(6)
2003	Slovenia B	1	(0)

Managerial career
- 2026–: Slovan
- * Club domestic league appearances and goals

Sebastjan Cimirotič (born 14 September 1974) is a retired Slovenian football player who played as a forward.

He earned a total of 33 caps for the Slovenia national football team and was a participant at the 2002 FIFA World Cup, scoring the nation's first ever World Cup goal.

== International career ==
Cimirotič debuted for Slovenia on 25 March 1998 against Poland. He represented Slovenia at the 2002 FIFA World Cup, scoring in their 3–1 defeat to Spain in Gwangju.

== Career statistics ==
=== International ===
Scores and results list Slovenia's goal tally first, score column indicates score after each Cimirotič goal.

List of international goals scored by Sebastjan Cimirotič
No.	Date	Venue	Opponent	Score	Result	Competition
1	6 June 2001	St. Jakob Park, Basel, Switzerland	Switzerland	1–0	1–0	2002 FIFA World Cup qualification
2	2 June 2002	Gwangju World Cup Stadium, Gwangju, South Korea	Spain	1–2	1–3	2002 FIFA World Cup
3	21 August 2002	Stadio Nereo Rocco, Trieste, Italy	Italy	1–0	1–0	Friendly
4	7 September 2002	Bežigrad Stadium, Ljubljana, Slovenia	Malta	3–0	3–0	UEFA Euro 2004 qualifying
5	20 August 2003	Fazanerija, Murska Sobota, Slovenia	Hungary	2–0	2–1	Friendly
6	3 September 2005	Arena Petrol, Celje, Slovenia	Norway	1–1	2–3	2006 FIFA World Cup qualification

== See also ==
- Slovenian international players
