= Senad Brkić =

Bosnian footballer (born 1969)

Personal information
- Date of birth: 3 September 1969 (age 57)
- Place of birth: Busovača, SFR Yugoslavia
- Height: 1.77 m (5 ft 10 in)
- Position: Striker

Team information
- Current team: Čelik Zenica U19 (manager)

Youth career
- Busovača

Senior career*
Years	Team	Apps	(Gls)
1988–1994	Čelik Zenica	23	(6)
1994–1998	Rijeka	85	(31)
1998–2000	Altay	17	(4)
2000–2006	Čelik Zenica	96	(43)
Total		211	(94)

International career
1996–2002	Bosnia and Herzegovina	7	(1)

Managerial career
- 2014–2016: Čelik Zenica (youth coach)
- 2016: Čelik Zenica (assistant)
- 2017: Čelik Zenica (assistant)
- 2017–2018: Čelik Zenica U17
- 2019–: Čelik Zenica U19
- * Club domestic league appearances and goals

Senad Brkić (born 3 September 1969) is a Bosnian former professional footballer and current football manager who is in charge of the Čelika Zenica under-19 team.

== Club career ==
In his career Brkić played for Bosnian club Čelik Zenica on two occasions (1988–1994; 2000–2006), Croatian club Rijeka (1994–1998) and Turkish club Altay (1998–2000). He left the biggest mark at Rijeka and Čelik, scoring 33 goals for each club in 90 and 69 matches for both of them respectevly. At Čelik, Brkić is considered as a club legend and is one of the top scorers in its history.

== International career ==
Brkić earned seven caps for the Bosnia and Herzegovina national team between 1996 and 2002. His first match for the national team was on 6 November 1996 against Italy in a 2–1 win, while his last match for the national team was on 7 September 2002 against Romania in a European Championship qualification 3–0 loss.

== Managerial career ==
Brkić started his managerial career in 2014 as a youth coach at Čelik. He stayed in that position until 2016, after which he got appointed as an assistant manager to Elvedin Beganović in the first team of the club. In March 2017, he again became an assistant manager in the first team, this time to Boris Pavić.

From July 2017 to 31 December 2018, Brkić was the manager of the under-17 team of Čelik Zenica. On 29 June 2019, he became the new manager of the under-19 team of the club.

== Career statistics ==
=== Club ===
Club	Season	League	League		Cup		Continental		Total	
Club	Season	League	Apps	Goals	Apps	Goals	Apps	Goals	Apps	Goals
1988–89	Čelik Zenica	Yugoslav First League	–		–		–		–	
1989–90	Čelik Zenica	Yugoslav Second League	–		–		–		–	
1990–91	Čelik Zenica	Yugoslav Third League	–		–		–		–	
Total			–		–		–		–	
1994–95	Rijeka	Prva HNL	11	1	1	0	–		12	1
1995–96	Rijeka	Prva HNL	31	15	3	2	–		35	16
1996–97	Rijeka	Prva HNL	17	9	0	0	–		17	9
1997–98	Rijeka	Prva HNL	26	6	1	0	–		27	6
Total			85	31	5	2	–		90	33
1998–99	Altay	Süper Lig	13	3	0	0	4	2	17	5
1999–00	Altay	Süper Lig	4	1	0	0	–		4	1
Total			17	4	0	0	4	2	21	6
2000–01	Čelik Zenica	Bosnian Premier League	0	0	–		–		0	0
2001–02	Čelik Zenica	Bosnian Premier League	16	1	–		3	3	19	4
2002–03	Čelik Zenica	Bosnian Premier League	26	20	–		–		26	20
2003–04	Čelik Zenica	Bosnian Premier League	8	2	–		–		8	2
2004–05	Čelik Zenica	Bosnian Premier League	14	7	–		–		14	7
2005–06	Čelik Zenica	Bosnian Premier League	2	0	–		–		2	0
Total			66	30	–		3	3	69	33
Career total			168	65	5	2	7	5	180	72

=== International ===
National team	Year	Apps	Goals
Bosnia and Herzegovina
Bosnia and Herzegovina	1996	1	0
Bosnia and Herzegovina	1997	1	0
Bosnia and Herzegovina	1998	1	0
Bosnia and Herzegovina	2002	1	0
Total		4	0

(Bosnia and Herzegovina score listed first, score column indicates score after each Brkić goal)

Goal	Date	Venue	Opponent	Score	Result	Competition
1.	3 June 1998	Skopje, North Macedonia	North Macedonia	1–1	1–1	Friendly
