= Damir Milinović =

Croatian footballer (born 1972)

Personal information
- Date of birth: 15 October 1972 (age 54)
- Place of birth: Rijeka, SFR Yugoslavia
- Height: 1.90 m (6 ft 3 in)
- Position: Defender

Team information
- Current team: Segesta (manager)

Senior career*
| Years | Team | Apps | (Gls) |
| 1992–1994 | Orijent 1919 | | |
| 1994–1997 | Rijeka | 79 | (6) |
| 1997 | Croatia Zagreb | 3 | (0) |
| 1998–2000 | Rijeka | 68 | (6) |
| 2000–2001 | VfL Bochum | 20 | (0) |
| 2001 | Rijeka | 8 | (1) |
| 2002 | NK Zagreb | 25 | (1) |
| 2003–2004 | Rijeka | 41 | (1) |
| 2004 | Dinamo Zagreb | 14 | (0) |
| 2005 | Austria Salzburg | 10 | (0) |
| 2005–2007 | Pomorac | 37 | (4) |
| Total | | 305 | (19) |

International career
| 1997–1999 | Croatia | 4 | (0) |
| 1999 | Croatia B | 1 | (0) |

Managerial career
- 2007–2010: Pomorac
- 2010–2012: Grobničan
- 2012: Gorica
- 2013–2015: Novigrad
- 2015: Cibalia
- 2015–2017: Gorica
- 2017–2019: Koper
- 2020–2021: Orijent 1919
- 2022–2023: Dubrava Tim Kabel
- 2023: Kustošija
- 2024–2025: Radnik
- 2025–present: Segesta
- * Club domestic league appearances and goals

Damir Milinović (born 15 October 1972) is a Croatian professional football manager and former player. He was named manager of Segesta Sisak in June 2025.

== Club career ==
Born in Rijeka, Milinović spent most of his career in his local club, Rijeka, before moving to Croatia Zagreb in 1997. He failed to impress in Croatia so he returned to Rijeka in the next season. After an impressive season with Rijeka, during which the club lost the title in last match, Milinović left for Germany in summer of 2000, signing with VfL Bochum. As Bochum finished last in the Bundesliga and were relegated, Milinović returned to Rijeka after only one season. He spent half a season in Rijeka before joining eventual season champions NK Zagreb. In January 2003, Milinović returned to Rijeka for the third and final time, spending there one and a half season before joining Dinamo Zagreb once again. He left Dinamo after only half a season, joining Austria Salzburg just few months before club was rebranded as Red Bull Salzburg. Milinović returned to Croatia after only half a season in Austria, signing for second division side Pomorac Kostrena. After two seasons with Pomorac, Milinović announced his retirement in summer of 2007.

== International career ==
Milinović made his debut for Croatia in a June 1997 Kirin Cup match against Turkey, coming on as a 85th-minute substitute for Tomislav Erceg, and earned a total of 4 caps, scoring no goals. His final international was an April 1999 friendly match against Italy.

== Managerial career ==
A few months after he announced his retirement, Milinović was appointed as a manager of his last club, Pomorac Kostrena. In Pomorac he was quite successful, finishing amongst top clubs in second division and reaching quarterfinals of Croatian Cup. He left Pomorac in 2010 and took over third division side NK Grobničan. With Milinović in charge, Grobničan went from mediocre third division club to one of the best clubs in the league. They were on the edge of promotion to second division two consecutive seasons but were financially incapable to take that step.

In May 2012, Milinović was appointed head coach of HNK Gorica. Milinović spent only six months in Gorica; he resigned in November 2012 after disappointing results in the first half of the season. In January 2013, Milinović took over third division side Novigrad. He signed for Gorica again, on 9 September 2015, but got sacked on 30 March 2017. In August 2017, Milinović became manager of Slovenian club FC Koper.

On 28 August 2020, Milinović was appointed to be second division side Orijent 1919 head coach.

== Career statistics ==
=== Club ===
Appearances and goals by club, season and competition
| Club | Season | League | | | National cup (Note: Includes Croatian Cup, DFB-Pokal, Austrian Cup) | | Continental | | Other | | Total | |
| Club | Season | Division | Apps | Goals | Apps | Goals | Apps | Goals | Apps | Goals | Apps | Goals |
|---|---|---|---|---|---|---|---|---|---|---|---|---|
| Orijent | 1992–93 | 2. HNL – South | | | 1 | 0 | – | | – | | | |
| Orijent | 1993–94 | 2. HNL – South | | | 2 | 0 | – | | – | | | |
| Orijent | Total | | | | 3 | 0 | | | | | 3 | 0 |
| Rijeka | 1994–95 | Prva HNL | 21 | 1 | 4 | 1 | – | | – | | 25 | 2 |
| Rijeka | 1995–96 | Prva HNL | 32 | 3 | 5 | 1 | – | | – | | 37 | 4 |
| Rijeka | 1996–97 | Prva HNL | 26 | 2 | 2 | 1 | – | | – | | 28 | 3 |
| Rijeka | Total | | 79 | 6 | 11 | 3 | 0 | 0 | 0 | 0 | 90 | 9 |
| Croatia Zagreb | 1997–98 | Prva HNL | 3 | 0 | 1 | 0 | 0 | 0 | – | | 4 | 0 |
| Rijeka | 1997–98 | Prva HNL | 14 | 2 | – | | – | | – | | 14 | 2 |
| Rijeka | 1998–99 | Prva HNL | 30 | 1 | 1 | 0 | – | | – | | 31 | 1 |
| Rijeka | 1999–00 | Prva HNL | 24 | 0 | 2 | 0 | 2 | 0 | – | | 28 | 0 |
| Rijeka | Total | | 68 | 3 | 3 | 0 | 2 | 0 | 0 | 0 | 73 | 3 |
| VfL Bochum | 2000–01 | Bundesliga | 20 | 0 | 2 | 0 | – | | – | | 22 | 0 |
| Rijeka | 2001–02 | Prva HNL | 8 | 1 | 4 | 1 | – | | – | | 12 | 2 |
| NK Zagreb | 2001–02 | Prva HNL | 11 | 1 | – | | – | | – | | 11 | 1 |
| NK Zagreb | 2002–03 | Prva HNL | 14 | 0 | 1 | 0 | 2 | 1 | 1 (Note: Appearance in Croatian Super Cup) | 0 | 18 | 1 |
| NK Zagreb | Total | | 25 | 1 | 1 | 0 | 2 | 1 | 1 | 0 | 29 | 2 |
| Rijeka | 2003–04 | Prva HNL | 29 | 1 | 5 | 0 | – | | – | | 34 | 1 |
| Dinamo Zagreb | 2004–05 | Prva HNL | 14 | 0 | 2 | 0 | 7 | 0 | 1 | 0 | 24 | 0 |
| Austria Salzburg | 2004–05 | Austrian Bundesliga | 10 | 0 | 1 | 0 | – | | – | | 11 | 0 |
| Pomorac Kostrena | 2005–06 | 2. HNL - South | 20 | 3 | 0 | 0 | – | | – | | 20 | 3 |
| Pomorac Kostrena | 2006–07 | 2. HNL | 17 | 1 | 0 | 0 | – | | – | | 17 | 1 |
| Pomorac Kostrena | Total | | 37 | 4 | 0 | 0 | 0 | 0 | 0 | 0 | 37 | 4 |
| Career total | | | 293 | 16 | 33 | 4 | 11 | 1 | 2 | 0 | 339 | 21 |

=== International ===
Appearances and goals by national team and year
| National team | Year | Apps | Goals |
|---|---|---|---|
| Croatia | 1997 | 1 | 0 |
| Croatia | 1998 | 0 | 0 |
| Croatia | 1999 | 3 | 0 |
| Total | | 4 | 0 |

== Managerial statistics ==
As of match played 29 August 2020

| Team | From | To | Record | | | | |
| Team | From | To | G | W | D | L | Win % |
|---|---|---|---|---|---|---|---|
| Gorica | 1 July 2012 | 25 November 2012 | 18 | 6 | 4 | 8 | 33.33 |
| Cibalia | 16 June 2015 | 7 September 2015 | 5 | 2 | 2 | 1 | 40.00 |
| Gorica | 9 September 2015 | 30 March 2017 | 69 | 26 | 21 | 22 | 37.68 |
| Orijent 1919 | 28 August 2020 | present | 17 | 7 | 3 | 7 | 41.18 |
| Total | | | 110 | 41 | 30 | 39 | 37.27 |

== Honours ==
=== Player ===
NK Zagreb

- Croatian First League: 2001–02
