= Branko Panić =

Croatian footballer

Personal information
- Full name: Branko Panić
- Date of birth: 24 November 1977 (age 48)
- Place of birth: Rijeka, Republika Hrvatska
- Position: Defender

Senior career*
Years	Team	Apps	(Gls)
1996–1998	Rijeka	13	(0)
1998–2000	Istra		
2000–2001	Orijent		
2001–2003	Pomorac	28	(3)
2005–2006	Sabah FA		(1)
2006–2007	Croatia Sesvete		
2007–2009	Flamurtari	53	(7)
2009–2011	Grobničan		(4)
2011	Borac Bakar		
- * Club domestic league appearances and goals as of 19 May 2010

Branko Panić (born 24 November 1977) is a retired Croatian footballer.

== Career ==
Panić previously played for HNK Rijeka and NK Pomorac in the Croatian Prva HNL and for KS Flamurtari Vlorë in Albania.
