= Andrej Živković =

Croatian footballer

Personal information
- Date of birth: 21 August 1970 (age 56)
- Place of birth: Rijeka, SFR Yugoslavia
- Position: Midfielder

Senior career*
Years	Team	Apps	(Gls)
1993–1996	Rijeka	71	(4)
1996–1998	Orijent	20+	(0+)
1998–2000	Istra	29+	(0+)
2000–2005	Pomorac		
2005–2006	Krk		
- * Club domestic league appearances and goals

Andrej Živković (born 21 August 1970) is a retired Croatian football midfielder.

== Career ==
As a player, he spent most of his career playing with Rijeka, Orijent, Istra and Pomorac, either in the Croatian First Football League or the Croatian Second Football League. He became a manager following his retirement from professional football, managing several lower tier clubs around Rijeka.
