= Admir Hasančić =

Bosnian footballer and manager (born 1970)

Personal information
- Date of birth: 29 November 1970 (age 55)
- Place of birth: Maglaj, SFR Yugoslavia
- Height: 1.76 m (5 ft 9 in)
- Position: Forward

Youth career
- Natron Maglaj
- Čelik Zenica

Senior career*
Years	Team	Apps	(Gls)
1990–1994	Čelik Zenica		
1994–2000	Rijeka	147	(46)
2001	Čelik Zenica	0	(0)
2001–2003	Zagreb	38	(16)
2003	Hapoel Petah Tikva	28	(14)
2004–2005	Čelik Zenica	27	(8)
2005–2007	Sarajevo	33	(5)
2007–2008	Natron Maglaj		
2008–2009	Krivaja Zavidovići		
Total		272	(89)

International career
1998–1999	Bosnia and Herzegovina	2	(0)

Managerial career
- 2013–2015: Sarajevo U17
- 2017–2022: Sarajevo U17
- 2024–2025: Radnik Hadžići
- * Club domestic league appearances and goals

Admir Hasančić (born 29 November 1970) is a Bosnian football manager and former player. He spent his career playing for Čelik Zenica and Sarajevo in Bosnia and Herzegovina, Rijeka and Zagreb in the Croatian First League and Hapoel Petah Tikva in Israel.

== Club career ==
With 46 league goals in 147 appearances, Hasančić is Rijeka's second top scoring and most capped foreign player. He is also the club's second top goalscorer in the Croatian Football League since 1992.

== International career ==
Hasančić made his debut for Bosnia and Herzegovina in a June 1998 friendly match away against Macedonia and earned a total of two caps, scoring no goals. His other international was a January 1999 friendly match against Malta.

== Career statistics ==
Appearances and goals by club, season and competition
Club	Season	League			Cup (Note: Includes Yugoslav Cup, Croatian Cup, Bosnian Cup, Israel State Cup.)		Continental		Total	
Club	Season	Division	Apps	Goals	Apps	Goals	Apps	Goals	Apps	Goals
Čelik Zenica	1990–91	Yugoslav Third League	–		–		–		0	0
Čelik Zenica	1991–92	Yugoslav Second League	–		–		–		0	0
Rijeka	1994–95	Prva HNL	6	0	0	0	–		6	0
Rijeka	1995–96	Prva HNL	27	4	3	0	–		30	4
Rijeka	1996–97	Prva HNL	22	10	1	1	–		23	11
Rijeka	1997–98	Prva HNL	28	11	2	0	–		30	11
Rijeka	1998–99	Prva HNL	27	9	0	0	–		27	9
Rijeka	1999–2000	Prva HNL	25	10	4	2	2	0	31	12
Rijeka	2000–01	Prva HNL	12	2	0	0	2	2	14	4
Rijeka	Total		147	46	10	3	4	2	161	51
Čelik Zenica	2000–01	Bosnian Premier League	0	0	–		–		0	0
Zagreb	2001–02	Prva HNL	26	14	2	1	–		28	15
Zagreb	2002–03	Prva HNL	12	2	1	0	2	0	15	2
Zagreb	Total		38	16	3	1	2	0	43	17
Hapoel Petah Tikva	2003–04	Israeli Premier League	28	14	1	1	–		29	15
Čelik Zenica	2004–05	Bosnian Premier League	27	8	–		–		27	8
Sarajevo	2005-06	Bosnian Premier League	17	5	–		–		17	5
Sarajevo	2006-07	Bosnian Premier League	16	0	–		2	0	18	0
Sarajevo	Total		33	5	0	0	2	0	35	5
Career total			272	89	16	5	8	2	296	96

== Honours ==
=== Player ===
Čelik Zenica

- Yugoslav Third League: 1990–91

Zagreb

- Croatian First League: 2001–02

Sarajevo

- Bosnian Premier League: 2006–07
