= 1998–99 Croatian First Football League =

Croatian First Football League
- Season: 1998–99
- Champions: Croatia Zagreb; 5th Croatian title 9th domestic title
- Relegated: Zadarkomerc; Mladost 127
- Champions League: Croatia Zagreb; Rijeka
- UEFA Cup: Hajduk Split; Osijek
- Intertoto Cup: Varteks; Hrvatski Dragovoljac
- Matches: 192
- Goals: 541 (2.82 per match)
- Best player: Miljenko Mumlek
- Top goalscorer: Joško Popović (21)
- Biggest home win: Varteks 7–0 Šibenik
- Biggest away win: Mladost 127 0–4 Croatia Zagreb
- Highest scoring: Zadarkomerc 5–3 Varteks
- Average attendance: 4,158

The 1998–99 Croatian First Football League, also known as 1. HNL, was the eighth season of the Croatian top-level football league since its establishment in 1992.

== Teams ==
Locations of teams in 1998–99 Prva HNL

=== Stadia and personnel ===
| Team | Manager^{1} | Location | Stadium | Capacity |
|---|---|---|---|---|
| Cibalia | (Croatia) Srećko Lušić | Vinkovci | Stadion HNK Cibalia | 10,000 |
| Croatia Zagreb | (Croatia) Ilija Lončarević | Zagreb | Stadion Maksimir | 37,168 |
| Hajduk Split | (Croatia) Ivan Katalinić | Split | Stadion Poljud | 35,000 |
| Hrvatski Dragovoljac | (Croatia) Branko Tucak | Zagreb | Stadion NŠC Stjepan Spajić^{2} | 5,000 |
| Mladost 127 | (Croatia) Mato Šarić | Suhopolje | Stadion Park | 5,000 |
| Osijek | (Croatia) Stanko Poklepović | Osijek | Stadion Gradski vrt | 19,500 |
| Rijeka | (Croatia) Nenad Gračan | Rijeka | Stadion Kantrida | 10,275 |
| Slaven Belupo | (Croatia) Luka Bonačić | Koprivnica | Gradski stadion u Koprivnici | 4,000 |
| Šibenik | (Croatia) Stanko Mršić | Šibenik | Stadion Šubićevac | 8,000 |
| Varteks | (Croatia) Dražen Besek | Varaždin | Stadion Varteks | 10,800 |
| Zadarkomerc | (Croatia) Josip Bajlo | Zadar | Stadion Stanovi | 5,860 |
| NK Zagreb | (Croatia) Zdenko Jurički | Zagreb | Stadion Kranjčevićeva | 8,850 |

- ^{1} On final match day of the season, played on 26 May 1999.
- ^{2} Hrvatski Dragovoljac also used Stadion ŠRC Stanko Vlajnić-Dida in Slavonski Brod for their last eight home matches of the season.

== Overview ==
It was contested by 12 teams, and Croatia Zagreb won the championship. In the first stage upper six teams advance to Championship Group, bottom six to Relegation Group, with 50% of points taken to the next phase of the competition.

== First stage ==
| Pos | Team | Pld | W | D | L | GF | GA | GD | Pts | Qualification |
|---|---|---|---|---|---|---|---|---|---|---|
| 1 | Croatia Zagreb | 22 | 17 | 2 | 3 | 44 | 14 | +30 | 53 | Qualification to championship group |
| 2 | Rijeka | 22 | 17 | 1 | 4 | 35 | 18 | +17 | 52 | Qualification to championship group |
| 3 | Hajduk Split | 22 | 12 | 6 | 4 | 38 | 17 | +21 | 42 | Qualification to championship group |
| 4 | Osijek | 22 | 11 | 3 | 8 | 37 | 23 | +14 | 36 | Qualification to championship group |
| 5 | Varteks | 22 | 9 | 3 | 10 | 40 | 36 | +4 | 30 | Qualification to championship group |
| 6 | Hrvatski Dragovoljac | 22 | 6 | 7 | 9 | 17 | 23 | −6 | 25 | Qualification to championship group |
| 7 | Šibenik | 22 | 7 | 3 | 12 | 27 | 45 | −18 | 24 | Qualification to relegation group |
| 8 | Cibalia | 22 | 6 | 5 | 11 | 22 | 29 | −7 | 23 (Note: Head-to-head record: Cibalia–NK Zagreb 1–1, NK Zagreb–Cibalia 2–2.) | Qualification to relegation group |
| 9 | NK Zagreb | 22 | 5 | 8 | 9 | 28 | 37 | −9 | 23 | Qualification to relegation group |
| 10 | Zadarkomerc | 22 | 5 | 6 | 11 | 27 | 40 | −13 | 21 (Note: Head-to-head record: Zadarkomerc–Slaven Belupo 2–1, Slaven Belupo–Zadarkomerc 1–1.) | Qualification to relegation group |
| 11 | Slaven Belupo | 22 | 5 | 6 | 11 | 24 | 37 | −13 | 21 | Qualification to relegation group |
| 12 | Mladost 127 | 22 | 5 | 4 | 13 | 22 | 42 | −20 | 19 | Qualification to relegation group |

Source: RSSSF.org
Rules for classification: 1st points; 2nd head-to-head points; 3rd head-to-head goal difference; 4th head-to-head away goals scored

=== Rounds 1–22 results ===
| Home \ Away | CIB | CZG | HAJ | HRD | MLA | OSI | RIJ | SLA | ŠIB | VAR | ZAD | ZAG |
|---|---|---|---|---|---|---|---|---|---|---|---|---|
| Cibalia | | 0–1 | 2–2 | 1–1 | 2–0 | 1–0 | 1–2 | 1–0 | 1–0 | 3–0 | 1–2 | 1–1 |
| Croatia Zagreb | 2–1 | | 1–0 | 2–1 | 3–0 | 4–2 | 3–0 | 2–1 | 4–1 | 2–0 | 4–0 | 4–0 |
| Hajduk Split | 2–0 | 1–1 | | 2–0 | 3–0 | 2–1 | 3–1 | 5–0 | 2–1 | 3–0 | 2–0 | 1–0 |
| Hrvatski Dragovoljac | 3–1 | 1–0 | 0–0 | | 0–0 | 0–0 | 1–0 | 0–0 | 1–2 | 0–0 | 2–1 | 3–2 |
| Mladost 127 | 0–0 | 0–4 | 1–1 | 3–0 | | 1–4 | 1–2 | 0–0 | 4–0 | 4–1 | 2–1 | 0–1 |
| Osijek | 3–1 | 0–1 | 0–1 | 2–1 | 1–3 | | 1–0 | 3–0 | 4–0 | 1–0 | 2–0 | 3–0 |
| Rijeka | 2–0 | 1–0 | 2–1 | 3–0 | 1–0 | 1–0 | | 1–1 | 3–1 | 3–2 | 4–1 | 1–0 |
| Slaven Belupo | 1–0 | 0–1 | 1–1 | 1–0 | 4–1 | 1–4 | 1–3 | | 3–1 | 2–3 | 1–1 | 2–1 |
| Šibenik | 2–1 | 1–2 | 1–0 | 0–2 | 4–1 | 2–1 | 0–1 | 3–1 | | 0–0 | 4–2 | 2–2 |
| Varteks | 3–0 | 2–0 | 1–4 | 1–0 | 6–0 | 2–3 | 0–1 | 3–2 | 7–0 | | 2–1 | 3–1 |
| Zadarkomerc | 0–2 | 1–1 | 1–1 | 2–1 | 2–0 | 1–1 | 0–1 | 2–1 | 0–0 | 5–3 | | 1–1 |
| NK Zagreb | 2–2 | 1–2 | 3–1 | 0–0 | 2–1 | 1–1 | 1–2 | 1–1 | 3–2 | 1–1 | 4–3 | |

Source: RSSSF.org
Legend: Blue = home team win; Yellow = draw; Red = away team win.

== Championship group ==
| Pos | Team | Pld | W | D | L | GF | GA | GD | Pts | Qualification |
|---|---|---|---|---|---|---|---|---|---|---|
| 1 | Croatia Zagreb (C) | 10 | 5 | 3 | 2 | 11 | 6 | +5 | 45 | Qualification to Champions League third qualifying round |
| 2 | Rijeka | 10 | 5 | 3 | 2 | 18 | 15 | +3 | 44 | Qualification to Champions League second qualifying round |
| 3 | Hajduk Split | 10 | 5 | 3 | 2 | 24 | 15 | +9 | 39 | Qualification to UEFA Cup qualifying round |
| 4 | Osijek | 10 | 3 | 3 | 4 | 14 | 16 | −2 | 30 | Qualification to UEFA Cup first round |
| 5 | Hrvatski Dragovoljac | 10 | 3 | 1 | 6 | 15 | 21 | −6 | 23 | Qualification to Intertoto Cup first round |
| 6 | Varteks | 10 | 2 | 1 | 7 | 10 | 19 | −9 | 22 | Qualification to Intertoto Cup first round |

Source: RSSSF.org
Rules for classification: 1st points; 2nd head-to-head points; 3rd head-to-head goal difference; 4th head-to-head away goals scored
(C) Champions

=== Rounds 23–32 results ===
| Home \ Away | CZG | HAJ | HRD | OSI | RIJ | VAR |
|---|---|---|---|---|---|---|
| Croatia Zagreb | | 1–1 | 1–0 | 1–1 | 0–1 | 2–0 |
| Hajduk Split | 1–0 | | 6–1 | 4–1 | 1–3 | 4–1 |
| Hrvatski Dragovoljac | 1–1 | 3–1 | | 3–2 | 1–2 | 3–0 |
| Osijek | 0–1 | 1–1 | 2–1 | | 5–2 | 0–2 |
| Rijeka | 0–2 | 3–3 | 3–0 | 1–1 | | 2–1 |
| Varteks | 1–2 | 1–2 | 3–2 | 0–1 | 1–1 | |

Source: RSSSF.org
Legend: Blue = home team win; Yellow = draw; Red = away team win.

== Relegation group ==
| Pos | Team | Pld | W | D | L | GF | GA | GD | Pts | Relegation |
|---|---|---|---|---|---|---|---|---|---|---|
| 7 | Slaven Belupo | 10 | 5 | 3 | 2 | 15 | 7 | +8 | 29 | |
| 8 | Šibenik | 10 | 5 | 2 | 3 | 21 | 14 | +7 | 29 | |
| 9 | Cibalia | 10 | 4 | 2 | 4 | 12 | 15 | −3 | 26 | |
| 10 | NK Zagreb | 10 | 4 | 1 | 5 | 19 | 16 | +3 | 25 | |
| 11 | Zadarkomerc (R) | 10 | 4 | 1 | 5 | 13 | 14 | −1 | 24 | Relegation to Croatian Second Football League |
| 12 | Mladost 127 (R) | 10 | 2 | 3 | 5 | 8 | 22 | −14 | 19 | Relegation to Croatian Second Football League |

Source: RSSSF.org
Rules for classification: 1st points; 2nd head-to-head points; 3rd head-to-head goal difference; 4th head-to-head away goals scored
(R) Relegated

=== Rounds 23–32 results ===
| Home \ Away | CIB | MLA | SLA | ŠIB | ZAD | ZAG |
|---|---|---|---|---|---|---|
| Cibalia | | 1–1 | 0–1 | 2–1 | 1–1 | 3–2 |
| Mladost 127 | 1–2 | | 0–0 | 3–3 | 1–0 | 2–1 |
| Slaven Belupo | 0–1 | 4–0 | | 3–0 | 1–0 | 2–2 |
| Šibenik | 1–0 | 5–0 | 1–1 | | 5–1 | 2–1 |
| Zadarkomerc | 4–1 | 2–0 | 1–0 | 3–1 | | 1–2 |
| NK Zagreb | 3–1 | 4–0 | 2–3 | 0–2 | 2–0 | |

Source: RSSSF.org
Legend: Blue = home team win; Yellow = draw; Red = away team win.

== Top goalscorers ==
| Rank | Player | Club | Goals |
|---|---|---|---|
| 1 | (Croatia) Joško Popović | Šibenik | 21 |
| 2 | (Croatia) Zvonimir Deranja | Hajduk Split | 14 |
| 2 | (Croatia) Igor Musa | Rijeka | 14 |
| 2 | (Hungary) Barnabás Sztipánovics | Rijeka | 14 |
| 5 | (Croatia) Nino Bule | NK Zagreb | 13 |
| 5 | (Croatia) Miljenko Mumlek | Varteks | 13 |
| 7 | (Croatia) Stanko Bubalo | Osijek | 10 |
| 7 | (Bosnia and Herzegovina) Mirza Golubica | Mladost 127 | 10 |
| 7 | (Croatia) Veldin Karić | Varteks | 10 |
| 7 | (Croatia) Jakša Krstulović | Zadar | 10 |
| 7 | (Bosnia and Herzegovina) Edin Mujčin | Croatia Zagreb | 10 |

== Attendances ==
| # | Club | Average |
|---|---|---|
| 1 | Hajduk | 11,875 |
| 2 | Rijeka | 8,500 |
| 3 | Croatia Zagreb | 6,406 |
| 4 | Varteks | 3,875 |
| 5 | Osijek | 3,194 |
| 6 | Zadar | 2,494 |
| 7 | Slaven | 2,469 |
| 8 | Hrvatski | 2,369 |
| 9 | Mladost | 2,225 |
| 10 | Šibenik | 1,981 |
| 11 | Cibalia | 1,763 |
| 12 | Zagreb | 1,450 |

== See also ==
- 1998–99 Croatian Second Football League
- 1998–99 Croatian Football Cup
