= HNK Suhopolje =

Croatian football club

Suhopolje
- Full name: HNK Suhopolje
- Nickname: Grofovi
- Founded: 1912
- Ground: Stadion Park
- Capacity: 5,000
- Manager: Albino Gašpić
- League: 1. ŽNL Virovitičko-podravska (V)
- 2017–18: 1. ŽNL Virovitičko-podravska, 1st
Home colours	Away colours

HNK Suhopolje is a Croatian football club based in a village Suhopolje, in the region of Slavonia. Biggest success of the club was playing in Prva HNL, when, under the name Mladost 127 achieved 3rd place in 1.A Croatian football league. In the year 2001, the club changed name from NK Mladost 127 to HNK Suhopolje.

== Honours ==
- Treća HNL – North (1): 2005–06
- Treća HNL – East (1): 2007–08
- 1.ŽNL – Virovitičko-podravska (3): 2015–16, 2016–17, 2017–18
