= 1996–97 HNK Hajduk Split season =

Hajduk Split
1996–97 season
- Chairman: Nadan Vidošević; Anđelko Gabrić
- Manager: Ivan Buljan
- Prva HNL: 2nd
- Croatian Cup: Quarter-finals
- UEFA Cup: Qualifying round
- Top goalscorer: League: Jurica Vučko (15); All: Jurica Vučko (17)
- Highest home attendance: 25,000 vs Croatia Zagreb (13 April 1997)
- Lowest home attendance: 500 (Two matches)
- Average home league attendance: 5,900

The 1996–97 season was the 86th season in Hajduk Split’s history and their sixth in the Prva HNL. Their 2nd place finish in the 1995–96 season meant it was their 6th successive season playing in the Prva HNL.

== Competitions ==
=== Overall record ===
Performance by competition
Competition	Starting round	Final position/round	First match	Last match
Prva HNL	—N/a	Runners-up	16 August 1996	1 June 1997
Croatian Football Cup	First round	Quarter-final	13 August 1996	23 October 1996
UEFA Cup	Preliminary round	Qualifying round	17 July 1996	20 August 1996

Statistics by competition
Competition	Pld	W	D	L	GF	GA	GD	Win%
Prva HNL	30	18	6	6	53	22	+31	60.00
Croatian Football Cup	4	2	1	1	12	5	+7	50.00
UEFA Cup	4	3	0	1	7	3	+4	75.00
Total	38	23	7	8	72	30	+42	60.53

=== Prva HNL ===
==== Classification ====
Pos	Team	Pld	W	D	L	GF	GA	GD	Pts	Qualification or relegation
1	Croatia Zagreb (C)	30	26	3	1	90	23	+67	81	Qualification to Champions League first qualifying round
2	Hajduk Split	30	18	6	6	53	22	+31	60	Qualification to UEFA Cup first qualifying round
3	Hrvatski Dragovoljac	30	13	10	7	51	37	+14	49	Qualification to Intertoto Cup group stage
4	Rijeka	30	13	7	10	44	32	+12	46	
5	NK Zagreb	30	13	6	11	43	39	+4	45	Qualification to Cup Winners' Cup qualifying round

Source: RSSSF.org
Rules for classification: 1st points; 2nd head-to-head points; 3rd goal difference 4th goals scored
(C) Champions

==== Results summary ====
Overall								Home						Away					
Pld	W	D	L	GF	GA	GD	Pts	W	D	L	GF	GA	GD	W	D	L	GF	GA	GD
30	18	6	6	53	22	+31	60	11	2	2	34	7	+27	7	4	4	19	15	+4

Last updated: 1 June 1997.
Source: Sportnet.hr

==== Results by round ====
Round	1	2	3	4	5	6	7	8	9	10	11	12	13	14	15	16	17	18	19	20	21	22	23	24	25	26	27	28	29	30
Ground	H	A	H	A	H	A	H	H	A	H	A	H	A	H	A	A	H	A	H	A	H	A	A	H	A	H	A	H	A	H
Result	W	W	W	W	W	L	D	W	W	W	D	W	W	W	D	W	W	W	W	L	L	D	W	D	L	W	D	W	L	L
Position	5	2	2	2	2	2	2	2	2	2	2	2	2	2	2	2	2	2	2	2	2	2	2	2	2	2	2	2	2	2

Source: Competitive matches
A = Away; H = Home; W = Win; D = Draw; L = Loss

==== Results by opponent ====
Team	Results		Points
Team	1	2	Points
Cibalia	4–0	0–3	3
Croatia Zagreb	1–2	1–2	0
Hrvatski Dragovoljac	0–0	0–0	2
Inker Zaprešić	2–0	4–0	6
Istra	1–1	2–3	1
Marsonia	7–0	1–2	3
Mladost 127	2–1	0–0	4
Orijent	2–0	2–0	6
Osijek	2–1	1–0	6
Rijeka	1–0	3–1	6
Segesta	0–0	2–0	4
Šibenik	2–0	1–0	6
Varteks	2–0	2–1	6
Zadarkomerc	5–1	2–2	4
NK Zagreb	1–0	0–2	3

Source: 1996–97 Croatian First Football League article

== Matches ==
=== Prva HNL ===
Round	Date	Venue	Opponent	Score	Attendance	Hajduk Scorers	Report
1	16 Aug	H	Orijent	2 – 0	7,000	Skoko, Sedloski	HRnogomet.com
2	25 Aug	A	Šibenik	2 – 0	6,000	Sarr (2)	HRnogomet.com
3	1 Sep	H	Osijek	2 – 1	5,000	Skoko (2)	HRnogomet.com
4	4 Sep	A	Varteks	2 – 1	3,000	Butorović, Vučko	HRnogomet.com
5	15 Sep	H	Marsonia	7 – 0	3,000	Vučko (3), Skoko, Sarr, Vulić, Madžar	HRnogomet.com
6	22 Sep	A	Croatia Zagreb	1 – 2	30,000	Leko	HRnogomet.com
7	29 Sep	H	Hrvatski Dragovoljac	0 – 0	10,000		HRnogomet.com
8	13 Oct	H	Rijeka	1 – 0	8,000	Vučko	HRnogomet.com
9	19 Oct	A	Mladost 127	2 – 1	7,500	Sarr, Skoko	HRnogomet.com
10	27 Oct	H	Cibalia	4 – 0	5,000	Skoko, Vučko (2), Lalić	HRnogomet.com
11	3 Nov	A	Segesta	0 – 0	8,000		HRnogomet.com
12	17 Nov	H	Zadarkomerc	5 – 1	2,000	Čeko, Sarr, Vulić, Madžar	HRnogomet.com
13	23 Nov	A	Inker Zaprešić	2 – 0	2,000	Vučko, Leko	HRnogomet.com
14	1 Dec	H	NK Zagreb	1 – 0	2,500	Sarr	HRnogomet.com
15	8 Dec	A	Istra	1 – 1	5,000	Čeko	HRnogomet.com
16	3 Mar	A	Orijent	2 – 0	2,000	Vučko (2)	HRnogomet.com
17	9 Mar	H	Šibenik	1 – 0	10,000	Vučko	HRnogomet.com
18	16 Mar	A	Osijek	1 – 0	3,000	Vučko	HRnogomet.com
19	23 Mar	H	Varteks	2 – 0	9,000	Erceg, Vučko	HRnogomet.com
20	6 Apr	A	Marsonia	1 – 2	7,000	Erceg	Slobodna Dalmacija
21	13 Apr	H	Croatia Zagreb	1 – 2	25,000	Erceg	HRnogomet.com
22	19 Apr	AR	Hrvatski Dragovoljac	0 – 0	3,000		HRnogomet.com
23	26 Apr	A	Rijeka	3 – 1	7,000	Dalić, Skoko, Vučko	HRnogomet.com
24	4 May	H	Mladost 127	0 – 0	3,000		HRnogomet.com
25	7 May	A	Cibalia	0 – 3	3,000		HRnogomet.com
26	11 May	H	Segesta	2 – 0	2,000	Skoko (2)	Slobodna Dalmacija
27	18 May	A	Zadarkomerc	2 – 2	7,000	Horvat, Erceg	HRnogomet.com
28	21 May	H	Inker Zaprešić	4 – 0	500	Skoko, Hrkovac (o.g.), Erceg (2)	HRnogomet.com
29	25 May	A	NK Zagreb	0 – 2	2,500		HRnogomet.com
30	1 Jun	H	Istra	2 – 3	500	Tudor, Deranja	HRnogomet.com

Source: hajduk.hr

=== Croatian Football Cup ===
Round	Date	Venue	Opponent	Score	Attendance	Hajduk Scorers	Report
R1	13 Aug	A	Hajduk Pridraga	6 – 1	3,500	Sarr (3), Dalić, Vulić, Sedloski	HRnogomet.com
R2	10 Sep	H	Slavonija Požega	3 – 0	1,000	Vučko (2), Sarr	HRnogomet.com
QF	16 Oct	A	Osijek	1 – 2	5,000	Čeko	HRnogomet.com
QF	23 Oct	H	Osijek	2 – 2	7,000	Sarr, Skoko	Slobodna Dalmacija

Source: hajduk.hr

=== UEFA Cup ===
Round	Date	Venue	Opponent	Score	Attendance	Hajduk Scorers	Report
PR	17 Jul	A (Moldova)	Zimbru Chișinău (Moldova)	4 – 0	6,000	Skoko (3), Vučko	UEFA.com
PR	24 Jul	H	Zimbru Chișinău (Moldova)	2 – 1	12,000	Skoko, Butorović	UEFA.com
QR	6 Aug	H	Torpedo Moscow (Russia)	1 – 0	20,000	Leonchenko (o.g.)	UEFA.com
QR	20 Aug	A (Russia)	Torpedo Moscow (Russia)	0 – 2	6,800		UEFA.com

Source: hajduk.hr

== Player seasonal records ==
=== Top scorers ===
Rank	Name	League	Europe	Cup	Total
1	(Croatia) Jurica Vučko	15	1	2	17
2	(Australia) Josip Skoko	11	4	1	16
3	(Liberia) Mass Sarr	6	–	5	11
4	(Croatia) Tomislav Erceg	6	–	–	6
5	(Croatia) Niko Čeko	3	–	1	4
6	(Croatia) Darko Butorović	1	1	–	2
6	(Croatia) Zlatko Dalić	1	–	1	2
6	(Croatia) Ivan Leko	2	–	–	2
6	(Croatia) Vedran Madžar	2	–	–	2
6	(North Macedonia) Goce Sedloski	1	–	1	2
6	(Croatia) Kazimir Vulić	1	–	1	2
12	(Croatia) Zvonimir Deranja	1	–	–	1
12	(Australia) Steve Horvat	1	–	–	1
12	(Croatia) Vik Lalić	1	–	–	1
12	(Croatia) Igor Tudor	1	–	–	1
	Own goals	1	1	–	2
	TOTALS	53	7	12	72

Source: Competitive matches

== See also ==
- 1996–97 Croatian First Football League
- 1996–97 Croatian Football Cup

== External sources ==
- 1996–97 Prva HNL at HRnogomet.com
- 1996–97 Croatian Cup at HRnogomet.com
- 1996–97 UEFA Cup at rsssf.com
