= 1995–96 HNK Hajduk Split season =

Hajduk Split
1995–96 season
- Chairman: Nadan Vidošević
- Manager: Ivan Katalinić; Mirko Jozić
- Prva HNL: 2nd
- Croatian Cup: Second round
- Champions League: Qualifying round
- Top goalscorer: League: Nenad Pralija (17); All: Nenad Pralija (17)
- Highest home attendance: 40,000 vs Croatia Zagreb (28 April 1996)
- Lowest home attendance: 2,000 (Three matches)
- Average home league attendance: 8,875
Home colours	Away colours

The 1995–96 season was the 85th season in Hajduk Split’s history and their fifth in the Prva HNL. Their 1st place finish in the 1994–95 season meant it was their 5th successive season playing in the Prva HNL.

== Competitions ==
=== Overall record ===
Performance by competition
Competition	Starting round	Final position/round	First match	Last match
Prva HNL	—N/a	Runners-up	13 August 1995	12 May 1996
Croatian Football Cup	First round	Second round	16 August 1995	25 October 1995
UEFA Champions League	Qualifying round		9 August 1995	23 August 1995

Statistics by competition
Competition	Pld	W	D	L	GF	GA	GD	Win%
Prva HNL	32	19	7	6	66	33	+33	59.38
Croatian Football Cup	4	2	1	1	4	2	+2	50.00
UEFA Champions League	2	0	2	0	1	1	+0	0.00
Total	38	21	10	7	69	36	+33	55.26

=== Prva HNL ===
==== First stage ====
Pos	Team	Pld	W	D	L	GF	GA	GD	Pts	Qualification
1	Croatia Zagreb	22	14	5	3	46	13	+33	47	Qualification to championship group
2	Hajduk Split	22	12	6	4	41	19	+22	42	Qualification to championship group
3	Osijek	22	12	4	6	38	19	+19	40	Qualification to championship group
4	Varteks	22	11	6	5	29	19	+10	39	Qualification to championship group
5	NK Zagreb	22	7	8	7	24	25	−1	29	Qualification to championship group

Source: RSSSF.org
Rules for classification: 1st points; 2nd head-to-head points; 3rd goal difference 4th goals scored.

==== Second stage ====
Pos	Team	Pld	W	D	L	GF	GA	GD	Pts	Qualification
1	Croatia Zagreb (C)	10	7	0	3	28	14	+14	26	Qualification to UEFA Cup preliminary round
2	Hajduk Split	10	7	1	2	25	14	+11	26	Qualification to UEFA Cup preliminary round
3	Varteks	10	7	1	2	15	7	+8	24	Qualification to Cup Winners' Cup qualifying round
4	Osijek	10	4	0	6	13	13	0	15	
5	Hrvatski Dragovoljac	10	1	3	6	8	23	−15	7	
6	NK Zagreb	10	1	1	8	7	25	−18	5	

Source: RSSSF.org
Rules for classification: 1st points; 2nd head-to-head points; 3rd goal difference 4th goals scored.
(C) Champions

==== Results summary ====
Overall								Home						Away					
Pld	W	D	L	GF	GA	GD	Pts	W	D	L	GF	GA	GD	W	D	L	GF	GA	GD
32	20	7	5	63	34	+29	67	14	2	0	38	10	+28	6	5	5	25	24	+1

Last updated: 12 May 1996.
Source: Sportnet.hr

==== Results by round ====
Round	1	2	3	4	5	6	7	8	9	10	11	12	13	14	15	16	17	18	19	20	21	22	23	24	25	26	27	28	29	30	31	32
Ground	H	A	H	A	H	A	H	A	H	A	H	A	H	A	H	A	H	A	H	A	H	A	H	H	A	H	A	A	A	H	A	H
Result	W	D	W	D	W	W	W	L	W	L	D	D	W	L	W	W	D	W	W	W	W	D	W	W	L	W	L	W	D	W	W	W
Position	4	4	2	3	2	2	2	2	2	2	3	3	3	3	3	3	3	3	3	3	2	2	2	1	2	2	3	2	3	2	3	2

Source: Competitive matches
A = Away; H = Home; W = Win; D = Draw; L = Loss

==== Results by opponent ====
Team	1–22		23–32		Points
Team	1	2	1	2	Points
Cibalia	4–1	4–2	—	—	6
Croatia Zagreb	0–1	2–1	1–4	3–2	6
Hrvatski Dragovoljac	—	—	5–1	2–2	4
Inker Zaprešić	3–1	0–0	—	—	4
Istra	5–0	1–3	—	—	3
Marsonia	0–0	3–0	—	—	4
Osijek	3–5	2–0	2–0	3–2	9
Rijeka	1–0	3–0	—	—	6
Segesta	1–1	3–1	—	—	4
Šibenik	0–0	0–0	—	—	2
Varteks	3–0	0–0	0–1	1–0	7
NK Zagreb	2–1	1–2	2–1	6–1	10

Source: 1995–96 Croatian First Football League article

== Matches ==
=== Prva HNL ===
Round	Date	Venue	Opponent	Score	Attendance	Hajduk Scorers	Report
1	13 Aug	H	Inker Zaprešić	3 – 1	3,000	Pralija (2), Jurčec	Slobodna Dalmacija
2	18 Aug	A	Segesta	1 – 1	3,000	Pralija	Slobodna Dalmacija
3	27 Aug	H	NK Zagreb	2 – 1	3,000	Cuzzi, Sarr	HRnogomet.com
4	10 Sep	A	Marsonia	0 – 0	8,000		HRnogomet.com
5	13 Sep	H	Cibalia	4 – 1	3,000	Pralija, Jurčec, Sarr (2)	HRnogomet.com
6	17 Sep	A	Varteks	3 – 0	7,000	Skoko, Sarr, Vučko	HRnogomet.com
7	20 Sep	H	Istra	5 – 0	4,000	Jurčec (2), Jurić, Sarr, Butorović	Slobodna Dalmacija
8	27 Sep	A	Croatia Zagreb	0 – 1	30,000		HRnogomet.com
9	1 Oct	H	Rijeka	1 – 0	4,000	Pralija	HRnogomet.com
10	15 Oct	A	Osijek	3 – 5	15,000	Pralija (2), Jurčec	HRnogomet.com
11	22 Oct	H	Šibenik	0 – 0	3,000		Slobodna Dalmacija
12	28 Oct	A	Inker Zaprešić	0 – 0	3,000		HRnogomet.com
13	5 Nov	H	Segesta	3 – 1	2,000	Pralija, Jurčec, Lalić	HRnogomet.com
14	11 Nov	A	NK Zagreb	1 – 2	4,000	Pralija	HRnogomet.com
15	19 Nov	H	Marsonia	3 – 0	4,000	Sarr (2), Meštrović	HRnogomet.com
16	26 Nov	A	Cibalia	4 – 2	2,500	Sarr (2), Pralija, Rapaić	HRnogomet.com
17	3 Dec	H	Varteks	0 – 0	5,000		HRnogomet.com
18	10 Dec	A	Istra	1 – 3	4,000	Jurčec	HRnogomet.com
19	17 Dec	H	Croatia Zagreb	2 – 1	8,000	Jurčec, Pralija	HRnogomet.com
20	17 Feb	A	Rijeka	3 – 0	6,000	Jurčec (2), Rapaić	HRnogomet.com
21	25 Feb	H	Osijek	2 – 0	15,000	Asanović, Jurčec	HRnogomet.com
22	3 Mar	A	Šibenik	0 – 0	9,000		HRnogomet.com
23	10 Mar	H	NK Zagreb	2 – 1	3,000	Jurčec, Rapaić	HRnogomet.com
24	17 Mar	H	Hrvatski Dragovoljac	5 – 1	15,000	Asanović, Pralija (2), Vuica, Čeko	HRnogomet.com
25	24 Mar	A	Croatia Zagreb	1 – 4	40,000	Asanović	HRnogomet.com
26	31 Mar	H	Osijek	2 – 0	10,000	Pralija, Meštrović	Slobodna Dalmacija
27	6 Apr	A	Varteks	0 – 1	15,000		HRnogomet.com
28	13 Apr	A	NK Zagreb	6 – 1	6,500	Rapaić, Butorović, Jurčec (2), Vučko	HRnogomet.com
29	20 Apr	AR	Hrvatski Dragovoljac	2 – 2	3,000	Vuica, Čeko	HRnogomet.com
30	28 Apr	H	Croatia Zagreb	3 – 2	40,000	Rapaić, Pralija, Čeko	Slobodna Dalmacija
31	5 May	A	Osijek	3 – 2	12,000	Pralija (2), Jurić	Slobodna Dalmacija
32	12 May	H	Varteks	1 – 0	20,000	Meštrović	HRnogomet.com

Source: hajduk.hr

=== Croatian Football Cup ===
Round	Date	Venue	Opponent	Score	Attendance	Hajduk Scorers	Report
R1	16 Aug	A	Pomorac Kostrena	2 – 0	2,000	Bazina, Meštrović	Slobodna Dalmacija
R1	6 Sep	H	Pomorac Kostrena	1 – 1	2,000	Vuica	HRnogomet.com
R2	11 Oct	A	Marsonia	0 – 1	3,000		Slobodna Dalmacija
R2	25 Oct	H	Marsonia	1 – 0 (1 – 3 p)	2,000	Vučko	HRnogomet.com

Source: hajduk.hr

=== Champions League ===
Round	Date	Venue	Opponent	Score	Attendance	Hajduk Scorers	Report
QR	9 Aug	A (Greece)	Panathinaikos (Greece)	0 – 0	0		UEFA.com
QR	23 Aug	HR	Panathinaikos (Greece)	1 – 1	15,000	Štimac	UEFA.com

Source: hajduk.hr

== Player seasonal records ==
=== Top scorers ===
Rank	Name	League	Europe	Cup	Total
1	(Croatia) Nenad Pralija	17	–	–	17
2	(Croatia) Renato Jurčec	13	–	–	13
3	(Liberia) Mass Sarr	9	–	–	9
4	(Croatia) Milan Rapaić	6	–	–	6
5	(Croatia) Mario Meštrović	3	–	1	4
5	(Croatia) Jurica Vučko	3	–	1	4
7	(Croatia) Aljoša Asanović	3	–	–	3
7	(Croatia) Niko Čeko	3	–	–	3
7	(Croatia) Damir Vuica	2	–	1	3
9	(Croatia) Ivan Jurić	2	–	–	2
9	(Croatia) Darko Butorović	2	–	–	2
12	(Croatia) Ivo Cuzzi	1	–	–	1
12	(Australia) Josip Skoko	1	–	–	1
12	(Croatia) Vik Lalić	1	–	–	1
12	(Croatia) Igor Štimac	–	1	–	1
12	(Croatia) Mario Bazina	–	–	1	1
	TOTALS	66	1	4	71

Source: Competitive matches

== See also ==
- 1995–96 Croatian First Football League
- 1995–96 Croatian Football Cup

== External sources ==
- 1995–96 Prva HNL at HRnogomet.com
- 1995–96 Croatian Cup at HRnogomet.com
- 1995–96 UEFA Champions League at rsssf.com
