= 1996–97 Croatian First Football League =

Croatian First Football League
- Season: 1996–97
- Champions: Croatia Zagreb; 3rd Croatian title 7th domestic title
- Relegated: Several clubs
- Champions League: Croatia Zagreb
- UEFA Cup: Hajduk Split
- Cup Winners' Cup: NK Zagreb
- Intertoto Cup: Hrvatski Dragovoljac
- Matches: 240
- Goals: 649 (2.7 per match)
- Top goalscorer: Igor Cvitanović (20)
- Biggest home win: Croatia Zagreb 7–0 Istra; Hajduk Split 7–0 Marsonia
- Biggest away win: NK Zagreb 0–6 Croatia Zagreb; Marsonia 0–6 Croatia Zagreb
- Highest scoring: Rijeka 5–3 Marsonia; Zadarkomerc 3–5 Varteks
- Average attendance: 2,903

The 1996–97 Croatian First Football League, also known as 1. HNL, was the sixth season of the Croatian top-level football league since its establishment in 1992.

== Stadia and personnel ==
| Team | Manager^{1} | Location | Stadium | Capacity |
|---|---|---|---|---|
| Cibalia | (Croatia) Tomislav Radić | Vinkovci | | |
| Croatia Zagreb | (Croatia) Otto Barić | Zagreb | Stadion Maksimir | 37,168 |
| Hajduk Split | (Croatia) Ivan Buljan | Split | Stadion Poljud | 35,000 |
| Hrvatski Dragovoljac | (Bosnia and Herzegovina) Blaž Slišković | Velika Gorica | Stadion Radnik | 8,000 |
| Inker Zaprešić | (Croatia) Đuro Bago | Zaprešić | | |
| Istra Pula | (Croatia) Ivica Šangulin | Pula | | |
| Marsonia | (Croatia) Miroslav Buljan | Slavonski Brod | | |
| Mladost 127 | (Croatia) Zlatko Toth | Suhopolje | Stadion Park | 5,000 |
| Orijent | (Croatia) Ilija Lončarević | Rijeka | Stadion Krimeja | 6,000 |
| Osijek | (Croatia) Milan Đuričić | Osijek | Stadion Gradski vrt | 19,500 |
| Rijeka | (Croatia) Branko Ivanković | Rijeka | Stadion Kantrida | 10,275 |
| Segesta | (Croatia) Zlatko Kranjčar | Sisak | | |
| Šibenik | (Croatia) Vinko Begović | Šibenik | Stadion Šubićevac | 8,000 |
| Varteks | (Croatia) Ivan Marković | Varaždin | Stadion Varteks | 10,800 |
| Zadarkomerc | (Croatia) Ante Čačić | Zadar | Stadion Stanovi | 5,860 |
| NK Zagreb | (Croatia) Krešimir Ganjto | Zagreb | Stadion Kranjčevićeva | 8,850 |

- ^{1} On final match day of the season, played on 1 June 1997.

== Prva A HNL ==
| Pos | Team | Pld | W | D | L | GF | GA | GD | Pts | Qualification or relegation |
|---|---|---|---|---|---|---|---|---|---|---|
| 1 | Croatia Zagreb (C) | 30 | 26 | 3 | 1 | 90 | 23 | +67 | 81 | Qualification to Champions League first qualifying round |
| 2 | Hajduk Split | 30 | 18 | 6 | 6 | 53 | 22 | +31 | 60 | Qualification to UEFA Cup first qualifying round |
| 3 | Hrvatski Dragovoljac | 30 | 13 | 10 | 7 | 51 | 37 | +14 | 49 | Qualification to Intertoto Cup group stage |
| 4 | Rijeka | 30 | 13 | 7 | 10 | 44 | 32 | +12 | 46 | |
| 5 | NK Zagreb | 30 | 13 | 6 | 11 | 43 | 39 | +4 | 45 | Qualification to Cup Winners' Cup qualifying round |
| 6 | Varteks | 30 | 12 | 6 | 12 | 34 | 35 | −1 | 42 | |
| 7 | Šibenik | 30 | 11 | 8 | 11 | 35 | 30 | +5 | 41 | |
| 8 | Osijek | 30 | 12 | 5 | 13 | 40 | 38 | +2 | 41 | |
| 9 | Mladost 127 | 30 | 10 | 10 | 10 | 37 | 36 | +1 | 40 | |
| 10 | Zadarkomerc | 30 | 11 | 7 | 12 | 39 | 45 | −6 | 40 | |
| 11 | Segesta (R) | 30 | 9 | 12 | 9 | 35 | 34 | +1 | 39 | Qualification to relegation play-offs |
| 12 | Marsonia (R) | 30 | 11 | 5 | 14 | 38 | 50 | −12 | 38 | Qualification to relegation play-offs |
| 13 | Cibalia (R) | 30 | 11 | 0 | 19 | 35 | 56 | −21 | 33 | Qualification to relegation play-offs |
| 14 | Orijent (R) | 30 | 5 | 11 | 14 | 28 | 53 | −25 | 26 | Relegation to Croatian Second Football League |
| 15 | Istra Pula (R) | 30 | 6 | 7 | 17 | 25 | 54 | −29 | 25 | Relegation to Croatian Second Football League |
| 16 | Inker Zaprešić (R) | 30 | 6 | 3 | 21 | 22 | 65 | −43 | 21 | Relegation to Croatian Second Football League |

Source: RSSSF.org
Rules for classification: 1st points; 2nd head-to-head points; 3rd goal difference 4th goals scored
(C) Champions; (R) Relegated

=== Results ===
| Home \ Away | CIB | CZG | HAJ | HRD | INK | IST | MAR | MLA | ORI | OSI | RIJ | SEG | ŠIB | VAR | ZAD | ZAG |
|---|---|---|---|---|---|---|---|---|---|---|---|---|---|---|---|---|
| Cibalia | | 0–1 | 3–0 | 2–0 | 2–0 | 3–2 | 2–0 | 3–0 | 0–3 | 1–2 | 1–4 | 2–0 | 2–1 | 2–0 | 1–2 | 0–2 |
| Croatia Zagreb | 3–0 | | 2–1 | 2–1 | 5–1 | 7–0 | 4–2 | 2–3 | 3–2 | 3–2 | 3–0 | 3–3 | 4–0 | 6–1 | 2–0 | 4–1 |
| Hajduk Split | 4–0 | 1–2 | | 0–0 | 4–0 | 2–3 | 7–0 | 0–0 | 2–0 | 2–1 | 1–0 | 2–0 | 1–0 | 2–0 | 5–1 | 1–0 |
| Hrvatski Dragovoljac | 2–1 | 0–3 | 0–0 | | 4–1 | 2–2 | 1–1 | 2–0 | 1–1 | 2–0 | 3–2 | 5–1 | 4–1 | 0–0 | 3–1 | 4–2 |
| Inker Zaprešić | 2–1 | 1–2 | 0–2 | 1–0 | | 1–0 | 2–0 | 1–0 | 2–2 | 0–0 | 0–2 | 0–3 | 2–1 | 1–4 | 0–1 | 1–2 |
| Istra Pula | 1–0 | 0–3 | 1–1 | 1–4 | 1–0 | | 0–2 | 2–2 | 1–0 | 0–1 | 0–2 | 0–0 | 1–1 | 0–1 | 3–0 | 3–2 |
| Marsonia | 1–0 | 0–6 | 2–1 | 1–2 | 4–1 | 1–0 | | 2–0 | 3–0 | 0–3 | 1–0 | 0–0 | 1–2 | 2–0 | 1–1 | 4–1 |
| Mladost 127 | 2–1 | 1–1 | 1–2 | 0–4 | 3–2 | 3–1 | 2–0 | | 5–1 | 0–0 | 0–0 | 1–1 | 2–1 | 3–0 | 3–0 | 0–0 |
| Orijent | 2–1 | 1–3 | 0–2 | 0–2 | 1–1 | 1–1 | 2–1 | 1–1 | | 2–0 | 2–2 | 1–1 | 1–1 | 1–0 | 0–0 | 1–1 |
| Osijek | 1–2 | 0–4 | 0–1 | 1–1 | 3–1 | 2–0 | 2–1 | 2–1 | 5–1 | | 4–0 | 1–1 | 1–1 | 2–0 | 2–1 | 0–2 |
| Rijeka | 3–0 | 1–2 | 1–3 | 2–2 | 4–0 | 2–0 | 5–3 | 0–0 | 4–0 | 2–0 | | 2–0 | 0–0 | 1–0 | 1–1 | 3–0 |
| Segesta | 3–1 | 0–1 | 0–0 | 3–0 | 4–0 | 3–0 | 2–1 | 0–0 | 1–1 | 2–1 | 1–0 | | 1–0 | 1–3 | 2–2 | 1–1 |
| Šibenik | 5–0 | 0–0 | 0–2 | 2–0 | 1–0 | 2–1 | 1–2 | 2–0 | 5–1 | 2–0 | 0–1 | 0–0 | | 0–0 | 2–1 | 2–0 |
| Varteks | 2–0 | 0–1 | 1–2 | 1–1 | 2–0 | 4–0 | 0–0 | 1–0 | 2–0 | 2–1 | 0–0 | 2–1 | 1–2 | | 1–0 | 1–1 |
| Zadarkomerc | 2–3 | 1–2 | 2–2 | 1–1 | 3–1 | 1–0 | 2–1 | 4–2 | 1–0 | 2–1 | 2–0 | 3–0 | 0–0 | 3–5 | | 1–0 |
| NK Zagreb | 6–1 | 0–6 | 2–0 | 4–0 | 4–0 | 1–1 | 1–1 | 0–2 | 1–0 | 1–2 | 3–0 | 1–0 | 1–0 | 2–0 | 1–0 | |

Source: RSSSF.org
Legend: Blue = home team win; Yellow = draw; Red = away team win.

== Prva B HNL ==
| Pos | Team | Pld | W | D | L | GF | GA | GD | Pts | Qualification or relegation |
|---|---|---|---|---|---|---|---|---|---|---|
| 1 | Samobor (P) | 30 | 22 | 6 | 2 | 70 | 21 | +49 | 72 | Qualification to relegation play-offs |
| 2 | Slaven Belupo (P) | 30 | 16 | 6 | 8 | 51 | 26 | +25 | 54 | Qualification to relegation play-offs |
| 3 | Dubrovnik (R) | 30 | 15 | 8 | 7 | 54 | 33 | +21 | 53 | Qualification to relegation play-offs |
| 4 | Slavonija Požega | 30 | 16 | 5 | 9 | 44 | 30 | +14 | 52 | Relegation to Croatian Second Football League |
| 5 | Mosor | 30 | 15 | 5 | 10 | 42 | 28 | +14 | 50 | Relegation to Croatian Second Football League |
| 6 | Ponikve | 30 | 14 | 3 | 13 | 50 | 47 | +3 | 45 | Relegation to Croatian Second Football League |
| 7 | Belišće | 30 | 12 | 8 | 10 | 41 | 35 | +6 | 44 | Relegation to Croatian Second Football League |
| 8 | Čakovec | 30 | 13 | 4 | 13 | 41 | 45 | −4 | 43 | Relegation to Croatian Second Football League |
| 9 | Zagorec Krapina | 30 | 12 | 6 | 12 | 51 | 42 | +9 | 42 | Relegation to Croatian Second Football League |
| 10 | Primorac | 30 | 13 | 2 | 15 | 32 | 49 | −17 | 41 | Relegation to Croatian Second Football League |
| 11 | Uskok Klis | 30 | 10 | 5 | 15 | 42 | 54 | −12 | 35 | Relegation to Croatian Second Football League |
| 12 | Junak | 30 | 9 | 8 | 13 | 29 | 46 | −17 | 35 | Relegation to Croatian Second Football League |
| 13 | Graničar Županja | 30 | 10 | 5 | 15 | 34 | 47 | −13 | 35 | Relegation to Croatian Second Football League |
| 14 | Neretva | 30 | 9 | 6 | 15 | 25 | 50 | −25 | 33 | Relegation to Croatian Second Football League |
| 15 | Napredak Velika Mlaka | 30 | 7 | 5 | 18 | 37 | 56 | −19 | 26 | Relegation to Croatian Second Football League |
| 16 | Olimpija Osijek | 30 | 3 | 6 | 21 | 27 | 61 | −34 | 15 | Relegation to Croatian Second Football League |

Source: RSSSF.org
Rules for classification: 1st points; 2nd head-to-head points; 3rd goal difference 4th goals scored
(P) Promoted; (R) Relegated

== Relegation play-offs ==
=== Group A ===
| Pos | Team | Pld | W | D | L | GF | GA | GD | Pts | Qualification or relegation |
|---|---|---|---|---|---|---|---|---|---|---|
| 1 | Samobor | 2 | 2 | 0 | 0 | 4 | 2 | +2 | 6 | Advanced to Croatian First Football League |
| 2 | Marsonia | 2 | 1 | 0 | 1 | 5 | 2 | +3 | 3 | Relegation to Croatian Second Football League |
| 3 | Dubrovnik | 2 | 0 | 0 | 2 | 1 | 6 | −5 | 0 | Relegation to Croatian Second Football League |

Source: RSSSF.org
Rules for classification: 1st points; 2nd head-to-head points; 3rd goal difference 4th goals scored

=== Group B ===
| Pos | Team | Pld | W | D | L | GF | GA | GD | Pts |
|---|---|---|---|---|---|---|---|---|---|
| 1 | Cibalia | 2 | 0 | 2 | 0 | 2 | 2 | 0 | 2 |
| 2 | Segesta | 2 | 0 | 2 | 0 | 2 | 2 | 0 | 2 |
| 3 | Slaven Belupo | 2 | 0 | 2 | 0 | 2 | 2 | 0 | 2 |

Source: RSSSF.org
Rules for classification: 1st points; 2nd head-to-head points; 3rd goal difference 4th goals scored

==== Replay ====
| Pos | Team | Pld | W | D | L | GF | GA | GD | Pts | Qualification or relegation |
|---|---|---|---|---|---|---|---|---|---|---|
| 1 | Slaven Belupo | 2 | 1 | 1 | 0 | 2 | 0 | +2 | 4 | Advanced to Croatian First Football League |
| 2 | Segesta | 2 | 0 | 2 | 0 | 0 | 0 | 0 | 2 | Relegation to Croatian Second Football League |
| 3 | Cibalia | 2 | 0 | 1 | 1 | 0 | 2 | −2 | 1 | Relegation to Croatian Second Football League |

Source: RSSSF.org
Rules for classification: 1st points; 2nd head-to-head points; 3rd goal difference 4th goals scored

== Top goalscorers ==
| Rank | Player | Club | Goals |
|---|---|---|---|
| 1 | (Croatia) Igor Cvitanović | Croatia Zagreb | 20 |
| 2 | (Croatia) Dragan Vukoja | Hrvatski Dragovoljac | 19 |
| 3 | (Australia) Mark Viduka | Croatia Zagreb | 18 |
| 4 | (Croatia) Jurica Vučko | Hajduk Split | 16 |
| 5 | (Croatia) Silvio Marić | Croatia Zagreb | 13 |
| 5 | (Croatia) Davor Vugrinec | Varteks | 13 |
| 7 | (Croatia) Miljenko Mumlek | Varteks | 12 |
| 8 | (Bosnia and Herzegovina) Admir Hasančić | Rijeka | 10 |
| 8 | (Croatia) Neno Katulić | Marsonia | 10 |
| 8 | (Romania) Dumitru Mitu | Osijek | 10 |
| 8 | (Australia) Josip Skoko | Hajduk Split | 10 |

== See also ==
- 1996–97 Croatian Second Football League
- 1996–97 Croatian Football Cup
