= 1994 Croatian Football Super Cup =

Hajduk Split	Croatia Zagreb
1	1
- Hajduk Split won 4–3 on penalties

First leg
Hajduk Split	Croatia Zagreb
1	0
- Date: 24 July 1994
- Venue: Stadion Poljud, Split
- Referee: Ivan Vranaričić (Đakovo)
- Attendance: 30,000

Second leg
Croatia Zagreb	Hajduk Split
1	0
- Date: 31 July 1994
- Venue: Stadion Maksimir, Zagreb
- Referee: Željko Širić (Osijek)
- Attendance: 15,000

The 1994 Croatian Football Super Cup was the third edition of the Croatian Football Super Cup, a two-legged affair contested between 1993–94 Croatian First League winners Hajduk Split and 1993–94 Croatian Football Cup winners Croatia Zagreb.

The first leg was played at Stadion Poljud in Split on 24 July 1994, while the second leg on 31 July 1994 at Stadion Maksimir in Zagreb.

== First leg ==
24 July 1994
20:30 CEST

Hajduk Split	1–0	Croatia Zagreb
Mornar 43'	Report

Stadion Poljud, Split
Attendance: 30,000
Referee: Ivan Vranaričić (Đakovo)

HAJDUK SPLIT:
GK	(Croatia) Tonči Gabrić
DF	(Croatia) Darko Butorović
DF	(Slovakia) Karol Praženica		(substituted off) 46'
DF	(Bosnia and Herzegovina) Mirsad Hibić
DF	(Croatia) Igor Štimac
MF	(Croatia) Stjepan Andrijašević
MF	(Croatia) Kazimir Vulić		(substituted off) 42'
MF	(Croatia) Milan Rapaić
MF	(Croatia) Ivica Mornar	(yellow card) 43' (red card)
MF	(Croatia) Dean Računica	Booked
FW	(Croatia) Mario Meštrović	Booked
Substitutes:
MF	(Croatia) Damir Vuica		(substituted on) 42'
MF	(Croatia) Nenad Pralija		(substituted on) 46'
Manager:
(Croatia) Ivan Katalinić

CROATIA ZAGREB:
GK	(Croatia) Dražen Ladić	Booked
DF	(Croatia) Dževad Turković
DF	(Croatia) Damir Lesjak	(yellow card)	(substituted off) 46'
DF	(Croatia) Zoran Mamić		(substituted off) 70'
DF	(Croatia) Zvonimir Soldo	Booked
DF	(Croatia) Slavko Ištvanić
MF	(Croatia) Sead Halilović
MF	(Croatia) Josip Gašpar	Booked
FW	(Croatia) Goran Vlaović
MF	(Croatia) Vjekoslav Škrinjar
FW	(Croatia) Igor Cvitanović	Booked
Substitutes:
MF	(Bosnia and Herzegovina) Fuad Šašivarević	Booked	(substituted on) 46'
FW	(Croatia) Igor Pamić		(substituted on) 70'
Manager:
(Croatia) Ivan Bedi

== Second leg ==
31 July 1994
20:15 CEST

Croatia Zagreb	1–0	Hajduk Split
Cvitanović 68' (pen.)	Report
Penalties
Cvitanović (penalty scored); Šašivarević (penalty scored); Pamić (penalty missed); Halilović (penalty scored); Ladić (penalty missed)	3–4	(penalty scored) Andrijašević; (penalty scored) Rapaić; (penalty missed) Meštrović; (penalty scored) Vukas; (penalty scored) Štimac

Stadion Maksimir, Zagreb
Attendance: 15,000
Referee: Željko Širić (Osijek)

CROATIA ZAGREB:
GK	(Croatia) Dražen Ladić
DF	(Croatia) Dževad Turković
DF	(Croatia) Josip Gašpar	(substituted off) 60'
DF	(Croatia) Zoran Mamić
DF	(Croatia) Zvonimir Soldo
DF	(Croatia) Slavko Ištvanić
MF	(Croatia) Sead Halilović	Booked
MF	(Bosnia and Herzegovina) Fuad Šašivarević
MF	(Croatia) Vjekoslav Škrinjar
FW	(Croatia) Goran Vlaović	(substituted off) 16'
FW	(Croatia) Igor Cvitanović
Substitutes:
FW	(Croatia) Igor Pamić	(substituted on) 16'
FW	(Croatia) Željko Adžić	(substituted on) 60'
Manager:
(Croatia) Ivan Bedi

HAJDUK SPLIT:
GK	(Croatia) Tonči Gabrić
DF	(Croatia) Darko Butorović
DF	(Slovakia) Karol Praženica
DF	(Bosnia and Herzegovina) Mirsad Hibić
DF	(Croatia) Igor Štimac	Booked
MF	(Croatia) Stjepan Andrijašević
MF	(Croatia) Damir Vuica	Booked
MF	(Croatia) Milan Rapaić
FW	(Croatia) Tomislav Erceg		(substituted off) 61'
MF	(Croatia) Aljoša Asanović	(yellow card)	(substituted off) 70'
FW	(Croatia) Mario Meštrović
Substitutes:
MF	(Croatia) Nenad Pralija		(substituted on) 61'
FW	(Croatia) Hari Vukas		(substituted on) 70'
Manager:
(Croatia) Ivan Katalinić
