= Igor Tudor =

Croatian footballer and coach (born 1978)

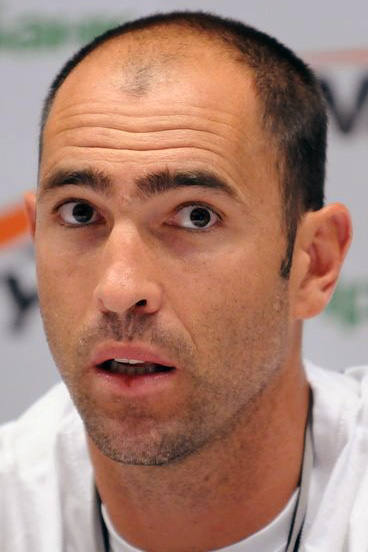
- Tudor with Hajduk Split in 2014

Personal information
- Full name: Igor Tudor
- Date of birth: 16 April 1978 (age 48)
- Place of birth: Split, SR Croatia, Yugoslavia
- Height: 1.92 m (6 ft 4 in)
- Position: Centre-back

Senior career*
Years	Team	Apps	(Gls)
1995–1998	Hajduk Split	58	(3)
1996	→ Trogir (loan)	5	(1)
1998–2007	Juventus	110	(15)
2005–2006	→ Siena (loan)	39	(2)
2007–2008	Hajduk Split	8	(1)
Total		221	(22)

International career
1994	Croatia U16	1	(0)
1993	Croatia U17	4	(0)
1994–1995	Croatia U18	3	(0)
1995	Croatia U19	2	(0)
1994–2000	Croatia U21	12	(2)
2001	Croatia B	1	(1)
1997–2006	Croatia	55	(3)

Managerial career
- 2013–2015: Hajduk Split
- 2015–2016: PAOK
- 2016–2017: Karabükspor
- 2017: Galatasaray
- 2018: Udinese
- 2019: Udinese
- 2020: Hajduk Split
- 2021–2022: Hellas Verona
- 2022–2023: Marseille
- 2024: Lazio
- 2025: Juventus
- 2026: Tottenham Hotspur
Medal record
Representing Croatia
FIFA World Cup
Bronze medal – third place	1998	Team
- * Club domestic league appearances and goals

Igor Tudor (born 16 April 1978) is a Croatian professional football manager and former player who was most recently the head coach of Premier League club Tottenham Hotspur.

Capable of playing either as a defender or defensive midfielder, Tudor spent most of his playing career at Juventus, winning several trophies during that time. He was a part of the Croatia national team at UEFA Euro 2004, the 1998 and 2006 World Cup, but missed the 2002 World Cup due to injury. Tudor announced his retirement on 22 July 2008 at age 30, after problems with his right ankle reappeared. He spent his final season playing for his youth club, Hajduk Split.

As manager, Tudor took charge of Hajduk from 2013 to 2015, and spent eight months with PAOK in the 2015–16 season. In Turkey, he managed Karabükspor from 2016 to 2017, and Galatasaray in 2017. From April to June 2018, Tudor managed Serie A side Udinese and in that time, saved the club from relegation to Serie B. In March 2019, he came back to Udinese. After he returned to Hajduk in January 2020, Andrea Pirlo invited Tudor to join his coaching staff at Juventus in August 2020, an offer which Tudor accepted. He became manager of Ligue 1 club Marseille in 2022 before leaving the club after one season in 2023. In March 2024, he returned to Serie A and was appointed as manager of Lazio before resigning at the end of the season. In March 2025, he returned to Juventus in the position of manager, but was sacked in October after a poor start to the season. In February 2026, he joined Tottenham Hotspur but departed in March.

== Playing career ==
Following three successful seasons at Hajduk Split, Tudor was noticed by Italian club Juventus in 1998 and signed for them shortly afterwards. At international level, Tudor earned a total of 55 appearances, scoring three goals for Croatia, with which he won the bronze medal at the 1998 FIFA World Cup, and later Order of the Croatian Interlace. He won the Croatian Player of the Year award in 2001.

== Style of play ==
Tudor was considered one of Croatia's best defenders in the period between the late 1990s and mid-2000s. Tudor was a large, hard-working, strong and imposing defender who excelled in the air, making him a dangerous goal threat during set pieces. He was also a tight man-marker and a hard tackling defender, with great tactical intelligence. Despite being primarily a central defender, he was capable of playing anywhere along the back line and even as a defensive midfielder, which was made possible due to his tactical versatility, stamina, and his surprisingly capable technical skills, ball control and distribution for such a large and physical player. Despite his talent, he was also injury-prone, which is often thought to have affected his playing career.

== Managerial career ==
=== Early management career ===
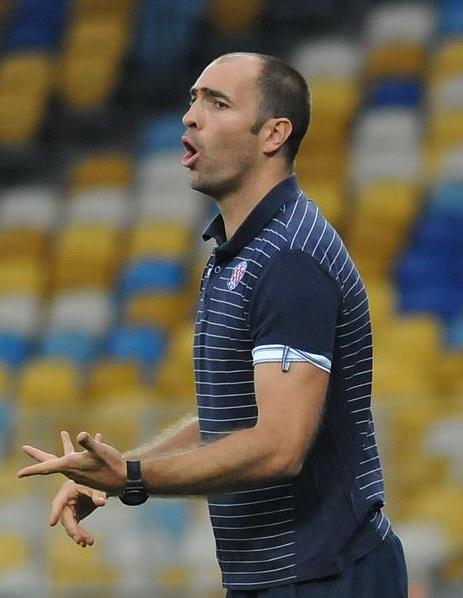
Tudor managing Hajduk Split in August 2014

He began his coaching career in the Hajduk Split youth teams. From July 2012, he was assistant coach to Igor Štimac in the Croatian national football team until 29 April 2013, when he took over as coach of Hajduk Split. On 4 February 2015, Tudor resigned from Hajduk Split after managing the club for more than year and nine months.

On 18 June 2015, Tudor was appointed coach of PAOK, signing a three-year contract. He lost 2–1 against Lokomotiva in his debut with PAOK for the second qualifying round of UEFA Europa League. He was sacked on 9 March 2016 due to "unsuccessful results and raging comments about the quality of the team". On 18 June 2016, he was appointed coach of Karabükspor on a one-year contract.

=== Galatasaray ===
On 15 February 2017, Tudor was appointed coach of Galatasaray, signing a one-and-a-half-year contract with the club. He was sacked by the club on 18 December.

=== Udinese ===
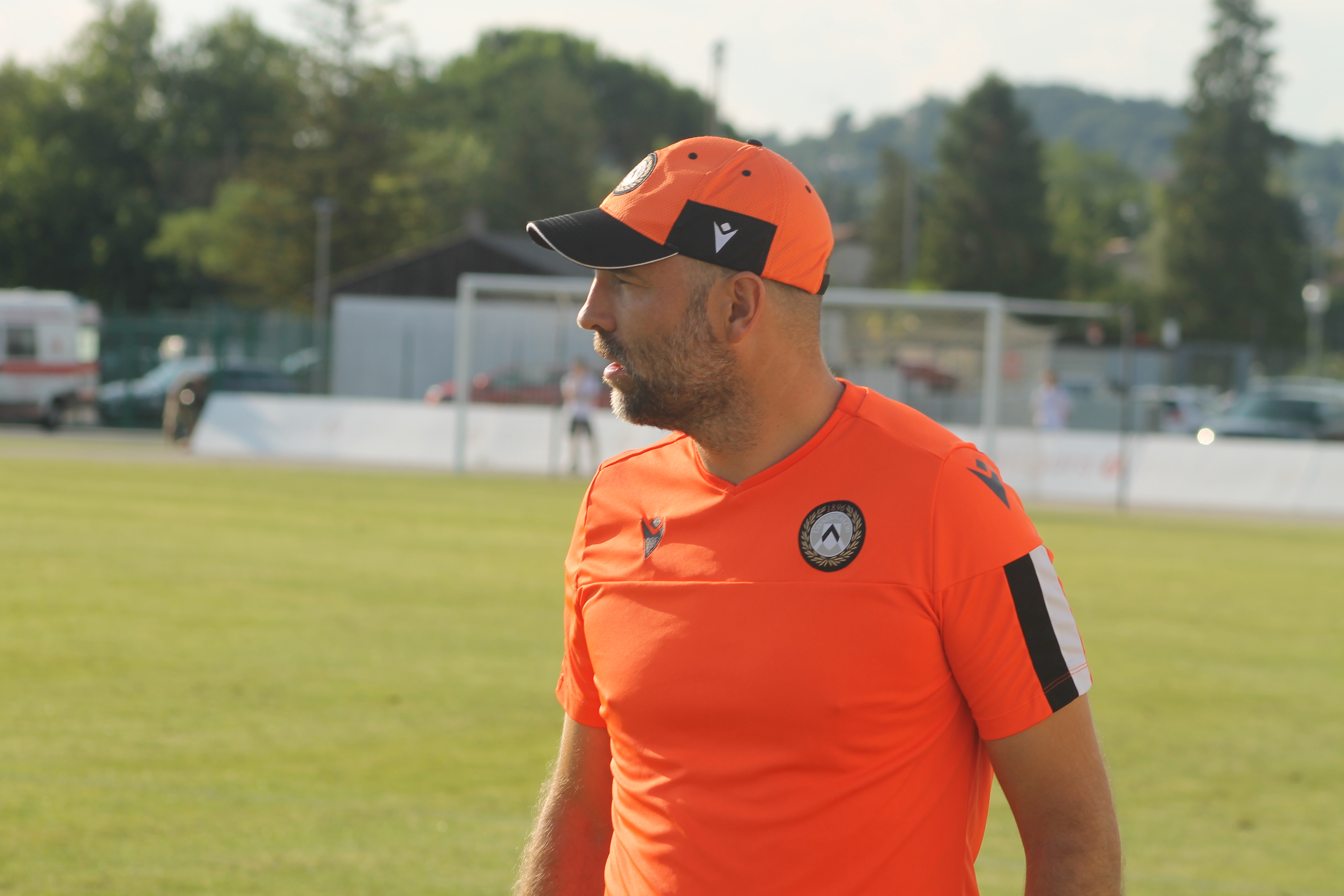
Tudor during Udinese training session in 2019

On 24 April 2018, Tudor was appointed coach of Italian club Udinese. On 13 May 2018, he led the club to a 1–0 victory against Verona. On 7 June, despite saving Udinese from relegation to Serie B, Tudor left the club after choosing to not extend his contract club's management.

On 20 March 2019, he became the manager of Udinese for a second time. His first win as Udinese's manager came on 30 March 2019 in a 2–0 home victory against Genoa. Following poor results, Tudor was sacked on 1 November.

=== Return to Hajduk Split ===
On 23 December 2019, Hajduk announced that Tudor has been selected as new manager. On 2 January 2020, he officially took his role. On 2 February, Tudor led his first match with Hajduk after three-and-a-half years in a 3–0 victory against Varaždin.

=== Juventus (assistant) ===
On 23 August 2020, Tudor resigned from Hajduk Split, and accepted an offer to assist Andrea Pirlo at the Serie A club Juventus. He was sacked after Inter Milan reclaimed its Serie A title.

=== Hellas Verona ===
On 14 September 2021, Tudor was appointed coach Serie A club Hellas Verona in place of Eusebio Di Francesco. Tudor immediately managed to turn the club's fortunes, ending the season in ninth place and achieving impressive performances throughout the season. On 28 May 2022, Verona announced to have parted ways with Tudor by mutual consent.

=== Marseille ===
On 4 July 2022, Tudor was named as the next manager of Marseille in the French Ligue 1. In the 2022–23 UEFA Champions League, Marseille were knocked out after finishing bottom of their group, following a 2–1 home loss against Tottenham Hotspur.

On 1 June 2023, Tudor announced that he was to part ways with the French club at the end of the season, stating in an official press release of his "tiredness" with the club. Upon his departure from the club, Tudor had secured a third-place finish in Ligue 1, therefore guaranteeing Marseille a place in the 2023–24 UEFA Champions League qualification stage.

=== Lazio ===
On 18 March 2024, Tudor signed with Serie A club Lazio after Maurizio Sarri resigned. The same year on 5 June, he resigned from his position at the end of 2023–24 season.

=== Juventus return ===
On 23 March 2025, Tudor replaced Thiago Motta as head coach of Serie A club Juventus. This appointment marked the first time Juventus had appointed a foreign manager since Didier Deschamps in the 2006–07 season. He eventually guided the club to the fourth place of league table and Champions League qualification at the end of the 2024–25 season. On 13 June, Tudor signed a contract extension that kept him in the club until 2028. In his first Champions League match with Juventus, he oversaw a 4–4 home draw against Borussia Dortmund, managed by Niko Kovač, 25 years after a 4–4 draw between Juventus and Hamburg in which both had scored as players. Tudor was sacked by Juventus on 27 October, a day after the team lost 1–0 away to Lazio, extending their winless run to eight games, ending his tenure after seven months in charge.

=== Tottenham Hotspur ===
On 13 February 2026, Tudor agreed a deal to become head coach of Tottenham until the end of the 2025–26 season, following the dismissal of Thomas Frank. His first five Premier League matches in charge produced four defeats and one draw, leaving Spurs a single point above the relegation zone and prompting scrutiny of his position. After a further run of poor results, and following the death of his father seven days earlier, he left the club by mutual consent on 29 March 2026. Roberto de Zerbi took over.

== Coaching style ==
Known for his forward-looking philosophy, Tudor seeks to impose an aggressive style of play in his teams. Describing his preferred style of play whilst manager of Marseille, he said, "I want courageous and intensive football, not only uniquely based on the defence. I want people who come to the stadium to be entertained and not disappointed."

== Career statistics ==
=== Club ===
Appearances and goals by club, season and competition
Club	Season	League			National cup (Note: Includes Croatian Football Cup, Coppa Italia)		Europe		Other		Total	
Club	Season	Division	Apps	Goals	Apps	Goals	Apps	Goals	Apps	Goals	Apps	Goals
Hajduk Split	1995–96	Prva HNL	9	0			0	0	—		9	0
Hajduk Split	1996–97	Prva HNL	23	1			3 (Note: Appearances in UEFA Cup)	0	—		26	1
Hajduk Split	1997–98	Prva HNL	26	4			5	1	—		31	5
Hajduk Split	Total		66	6			8	1	—		74	7
Trogir (loan)	1995–96	Treća HNL	5	1			—		—		5	1
Juventus	1998–99	Serie A	23	1	4	0	6 (Note: Appearances in UEFA Champions League)	0	3 (Note: One appearance in Supercoppa Italiana, two appearances in Serie A UEFA Cup qualification play-offs)	0	36	1
Juventus	1999–2000	Serie A	17	1	2	0	9	1	—		28	2
Juventus	2000–01	Serie A	25	6	2	0	5	1	—		32	7
Juventus	2001–02	Serie A	14	4	1	0	6	2	—		21	6
Juventus	2002–03	Serie A	14	1	2	0	11	1	0	0	27	2
Juventus	2003–04	Serie A	15	2	6	1	5	0	0	0	26	3
Juventus	2004–05	Serie A	2	0	1	0	1	0	—		4	0
Juventus	2006–07	Serie B	0	0	—		—		—		0	0
Juventus	Total		110	15	18	1	43	5	3	0	174	21
Siena (loan)	2004–05	Serie A	15	1	—		—		—		15	1
Siena (loan)	2005–06	Serie A	24	1	0	0	—		—		24	1
Siena (loan)	Total		39	2	0	0	—		—		39	2
Hajduk Split	2007–08	Prva HNL	8	1					—		8	1
Career total			228	25	18	1	51	6	3	0	300	32

=== International ===
Scores and results list Croatia's goal tally first, score column indicates score after each Tudor goal.

List of international goals scored by Igor Tudor
No.	Date	Venue	Opponent	Score	Result	Competition
1	21 June 2004	Estádio da Luz, Lisbon, Portugal	England	2–3	2–4	UEFA Euro 2004
2	30 March 2005	Stadion Maksimir, Zagreb, Croatia	Malta	3–0	3–0	2006 FIFA World Cup qualification
3	4 June 2005	Vasil Levski National Stadium, Sofia, Bulgaria	Bulgaria	2–0	3–1	2006 FIFA World Cup qualification

== Managerial statistics ==
As of 29 March 2026

Managerial record by team and tenure
Team	From	To	Record					Ref.
Team	From	To	P	W	D	L	Win %	Ref.
Hajduk Split	29 April 2013	4 February 2015	78	35	21	22	44.9	
PAOK	18 June 2015	9 March 2016	45	17	17	11	37.8	
Karabükspor	18 June 2016	15 February 2017	21	8	3	10	38.1	
Galatasaray	15 February 2017	18 December 2017	34	19	4	11	55.9	
Udinese	24 April 2018	7 June 2018	4	2	1	1	50.0	
Udinese	20 March 2019	1 November 2019	22	9	4	9	40.9	
Hajduk Split	2 January 2020	21 August 2020	18	9	1	8	50.0	
Hellas Verona	14 September 2021	28 May 2022	36	14	11	11	38.9	
Marseille	4 July 2022	1 June 2023	48	27	8	13	56.3	
Lazio	18 March 2024	6 June 2024	11	6	3	2	54.5	
Juventus	23 March 2025	27 October 2025	24	10	8	6	41.7	
Tottenham Hotspur	13 February 2026	29 March 2026	7	1	1	5	14.3	
Career total			348	157	82	109	45.1	

== Honours ==
=== Player ===
Juventus

- Serie A: 2001–02, 2002–03
- Serie B: 2006–07
- UEFA Intertoto Cup: 1999
- Coppa Italia runner-up: 2001–02, 2003–04
- UEFA Champions League runner-up: 2002–03

Croatia

- FIFA World Cup third place: 1998

Individual

- Croatian Footballer of the Year: 2001

=== Manager ===
Hajduk Split

- Croatian Cup: 2012–13
