= 1996–97 Croatian Football Cup =

Tournament details
- Country: Croatia
- Teams: 32

Final positions
- Champions: Croatia Zagreb (3rd title)
- Runners-up: NK Zagreb

Tournament statistics
- Matches played: 37
- Goals scored: 116 (3.14 per match)
- Top goal scorer(s): Mass Sarr, Mark Viduka & Dragan Vukoja (5)

The 1996–97 Croatian Football Cup was the sixth edition of Croatia's football knockout competition. Croatia Zagreb were the defending champions, and they won their second successive title.

== Calendar ==
Round	Main date	Number of fixtures	Clubs	New entries this round
First round	13 and 26 August 1996	16	32 → 16	None
Second round	4 and 10 September 1996	8	16 → 8	None
Quarter-finals	First legs 16 October 1996, Second legs 22 and 23 October 1996	8	8 → 4	None
Semi-finals	First legs 9 April 1997, Second legs 16 April 1997	4	4 → 2	None
Final	29 May 1997	1	2 → 1	None

== First round ==
Tie no	Home team	Score	Away team
1	Hajduk Pridraga	1–6	Hajduk Split
2	Mladost Hrastovec	1–3	Varteks
3	Napredak Velika Mlaka	2–3	Segesta
4	Orijent	0–0 (aet) (5–6 p)	Belišće
5	Gospić	0–0 (aet) (5–4 p)	Zadarkomerc
6	Podvinje	0–1	Inker Zaprešić
7	Varaždin	1–5	Rijeka
8	Solin Kaltenberg	0–3	NK Zagreb
9	Mladost 127	1–2 (aet)	Osijek
10	Hrvatski Dragovoljac	3–1	Cibalia
11	Baranja	1–2 (aet)	Croatia Đakovo
12	Slavonija Požega	3–1	Bjelovar
13	Slaven Belupo	1–0	Istra Pula
14	Zagorec Krapina	1–1 (aet) (5–3 p)	Šibenik
15	PIK Vrbovec	0–3	Dubrovnik
16	Zrinski Bošnjaci	0–5	Croatia Zagreb

== Second round ==
Tie no	Home team	Score	Away team
1	Osijek	3–0	Segesta
2	NK Zagreb	2–1	Zagorec Krapina
3	Inker Zaprešić	2–1	Belišće
4	Slaven Belupo	3–6	Croatia Zagreb
5	Hrvatski Dragovoljac	1–0	Rijeka
6	Gospić	0–3	Dubrovnik
7	Hajduk Split	3–0	Slavonija Požega
8	Varteks	4–0	Croatia Đakovo

== Quarter-finals ==
Team 1	Agg.	Team 2	1st leg	2nd leg
Croatia Zagreb	4–1	Dubrovnik	1–1	3–0
NK Zagreb	4–0	Inker Zaprešić	3–0	1–0
Osijek	4–3	Hajduk Split	2–1	2–2
Varteks	2–4	Hrvatski Dragovoljac	1–3	1–1

== Semi-finals ==
9 April 1997
18:00

Croatia Zagreb	2–1	Osijek
Viduka 20', 55' (pen.)	Report	Černe 81'

Stadion Maksimir, Zagreb
Attendance: 5,000
Referee: Anđelko Brkić (Vinkovci)
16 April 1997
16:30

Osijek	0–0	Croatia Zagreb
	Report

Stadion Gradski vrt, Osijek
Attendance: 10,000
Referee: Veljko Matković (Rijeka)

Croatia Zagreb won 2–1 on aggregate.

9 April 1997
15:30

Hrvatski Dragovoljac	1–3	NK Zagreb
Vukoja 32'	Report	Scoria 9', 58'; Bule 62'

Stadion Radnik, Velika Gorica
Attendance: 1,500
Referee: Veljko Malovac (Rijeka)
16 April 1997
16:30

NK Zagreb	3–1	Hrvatski Dragovoljac
Scoria 23', 50'; Baturina 79'	Report	Živković 6'

Stadion Kranjčevićeva, Zagreb
Attendance: 1,500
Referee: Reno Sinovčić (Zadar)

NK Zagreb won 6–2 on aggregate.

== Final ==
29 May 1997
20:30

Croatia Zagreb	2–1	NK Zagreb
Cvitanović 30' (pen.); Viduka 69'	Report	Sopić 77'

Stadion Maksimir, Zagreb
Attendance: 15,000
Referee: Goran Marić (Zagreb)

== See also ==
- 1996–97 Croatian First Football League
