= NK Neretva =

Association football club in Croatia

Neretva
- Full name: Nogometni klub Neretva Metković
- Nickname: The Blue-Whites
- Founded: 1919; 107 years ago 2017 (refounded)
- Ground: Igralište iza Vage
- Capacity: 3,000
- President: Nikola Kaleb
- Head coach: Goran Galov
- League: 3. NL – Jug
Home colours	Away colours	Third colours

Nogometni klub Neretva Metković (English: Neretva Football Club), commonly referred to as NK Neretva or simply Neretva, is a Croatian professional football club based in the town of Metković, in the region of Dubrovnik-Neretva County. The club's first name was NK Narona. On 9 November 1945, in accordance with the state provision forbidding clubs from bearing foreign names, its name was changed to NK Neretva. Neretva reached the Croatian first league in the 1994–95 season.

The club's supporters are known as the Blue White Killers (BWK). NK Neretva plays its home matches at Igralište iza Vage, which has a capacity of 3,000. They were briefly dissolved in 2017 for financial reasons. However, in July that year, a new club was re-formed under the same name.

== Derby ==
Neretva contest the "El Clasico" with local rivals NK Neretvanac Opuzen.

As of 2021	GP	W	D	L
All	54	16	14	24

== Women's team ==
As of 2017, Neretva fielded a women's team in the top flight of Croatian football, ŽNK Neretva. They finished 5th in the 2. HNL (Second Division) in 2016.

== Recent seasons ==
Season	League									Cup
Season	Division	P	W	D	L	F	A	Pts	Pos	Cup
1992	2. HNL South	14	4	5	5	14	11	13	4th	
1992–93	2. HNL South	30	12	11	7	41	28	35	4th	R1
1993–94	2. HNL South	30	22	7	0	60	15	51	1st ↑	
1994–95	1. HNL	30	4	11	15	20	44	23	15th ↓	
1995–96	1. B HNL	28	10	7	11	36	30	37	6th	R2
1996–97	1. B HNL	30	9	6	15	25	50	33	14th	
1997–98	2. HNL South	32	13	4	15	42	34	43	8th	
1998–99	3. HNL South	34	13	7	14	44	47	46	11th	PR
1999–2000	3. HNL South	29	14	6	9	46	39	48	4th	R2
2000–01	3. HNL South	28	6	10	12	32	45	28	13th	
2001–02	3. HNL South	30	11	6	13	38	41	39	11th	
2002–03	3. HNL South	28	13	6	9	42	36	45	4th	
2003–04	3. HNL South	30	9	10	11	31	34	37	12th	R2
2004–05	3. HNL South	34	12	11	11	56	44	47	9th	
2005–06	3. HNL South	34	19	3	12	54	39	60	2nd	
2006–07	3. HNL South	34	16	3	15	48	54	51	6th	
2007–08	3. HNL South	34	13	4	17	36	59	43	10th	
2008–09	3. HNL South	34	9	11	14	39	54	38	14th	
2009–10	3. HNL South	32	9	11	12	37	52	38	14th	
2010–11	3. HNL South	34	13	6	15	37	53	45	13th	
2011–12	3. HNL South	34	14	5	15	58	64	47	10th	
2012–13	3. HNL South	34	12	7	11	48	37	43	12th	
2013–14	3. HNL South	34	11	12	11	29	29	45	6th	
2014–15	3. HNL South	34	12	10	12	53	57	46	7th	
2015–16	3. HNL South	34	12	8	14	39	49	44	12th	
2016–17	3. HNL South	34	11	5	18	36	57	38	15th ↓	

== Honours ==
=== League ===
- Croatian Second League
  - Winners (1): 1993–94 (south)

== See also ==
- ŽNK Neretva
