= NK Bjelovar =

Croatian football club

- Full name: Nogometni klub Bjelovar
- Founded: 1908
- Ground: Gradski stadion
- Capacity: 4,000
- Chairman: Marko Ćurić
- Manager: Tomislav Mikulić
- League: Second League (III)
Home colours	Away colours

NK Bjelovar is a Croatian professional football club based in the town of Bjelovar.

Bjelovar opened a new stadium in 2022. shortly before advancing to the new Second League.

== Honours ==
Treća HNL – North:

- Winners (1): 2003–04

== Recent seasons ==
Season	League									Cup
Season	Division	P	W	D	L	F	A	Pts	Pos	Cup
1992										
1992–93	2. HNL North	30	12	5	13	50	47	29	9th	
1993–94	2. HNL North	30	13	7	10	34	36	33	7th	QF
1994–95	2. HNL North	30	15	10	5	69	25	55	4th	R1
1995–96	2. HNL North	30	14	5	11	42	36	47	7th	R1
1996–97	2. HNL North	30	23	4	3	73	25	73	2nd	R1
1997–98	2. HNL North	30	19	4	7	71	36	61	3rd	R1
1998–99	2. HNL	36	17	7	12	53	43	58	7th	R1
1999–00	2. HNL	32	9	5	18	38	49	32	13th	R2
2000–01	2. HNL	34	12	8	14	43	52	44	13th	PR
2001–02	2. HNL North	30	12	4	14	49	47	40	10th ↓	R1
2002–03	3. HNL North	30	21	7	2	99	29	70	2nd	PR
2003–04	3. HNL North	30	24	2	4	108	38	74	1st ↑	R2
2004–05	2. HNL North	32	11	8	13	54	53	41	8th	R1
2005–06	2. HNL North	32	14	6	12	39	39	48	5th	PR
2006–07	2. HNL	30	4	6	20	25	66	18	15th ↓	R1
2007–08	3. HNL East	34	13	10	11	33	32	49	12th	R2
2008–09	3. HNL East	33	15	7	11	54	49	52	8th	PR
2009–10	3. HNL East	34	15	10	9	62	44	55	6th	PR
2010–11	3. HNL East	34	19	6	9	65	44	63	4th	PR
2011–12	3. HNL North	30	20	5	5	64	17	65	3rd	
2012–13	3. HNL North	30	12	7	11	47	33	43	7th	PR
2013–14	3. HNL North	30	19	8	3	81	32	65	2nd	
2014–15	3. HNL East	30	10	7	13	35	42	37	12th	
2015–16	3. HNL East	30	17	6	7	61	29	57	2nd	
2016–17	3. HNL East	30	12	4	14	45	48	40	10th	R2
2017–18	3. HNL East	30	11	4	15	32	40	37	10th	R1

=== Key ===
1st	2nd	↑	↓
Champions	Runners-up	Promoted	Relegated

- P = Played
- W = Games won
- D = Games drawn
- L = Games lost
- F = Goals for
- A = Goals against
- Pts = Points
- Pos = Final position
- 1. HNL = Prva HNL
- 2. HNL = Druga HNL
- 3. HNL = Treća HNL
- PR = Preliminary round
- R1 = Round 1
- R2 = Round 2
- QF = Quarter-finals
- SF = Semi-finals
- RU = Runners-up
- W = Winners

== Current squad ==
As of 4 February 2023

Note: Flags indicate national team as defined under FIFA eligibility rules; some limited exceptions apply. Players may hold more than one non-FIFA nationality.

No.	Pos.	Nation	Player
1	GK	CRO	Gabriel Iličević
2	FW	CRO	Mario Ljevar
4	MF	CRO	Tomislav Soldić
5		CRO	David Crnjac
7	FW	CRO	Dominik Glavina
8		CRO	Luka Varga
9	MF	BIH	Jovan Motika
10	MF	CRO	Jakov Pranjić
11	MF	BIH	Damjan Jurić
12	GK	CRO	Marko-Antonio Djordjević
13	DF	CRO	Mario Nikolić

No.	Pos.	Nation	Player
14	MF	CRO	Adrijan Coha
15	DF	CRO	Patrik Šantalab
16	FW	CRO	Jakov Delibegović
18	MF	BIH	Josip Šantić
19		CRO	Dorijan Jurčević
20	FW	BRA	Lucas Fernandes Dos Passos
22	DF	KSA	Mishal Haddad
24	FW	CRO	Vedran Kočiš
26	FW	BIH	Josip Serdarušić
27	MF	CRO	Matej Šantek
34	MF	BIH	Karlo Marić
77		CRO	Dean Radošević
