= 1992–93 Croatian Second Football League =

Druga HNL
- Season: 1992–93
- Champions: North: NK Dubrava; South: NK Primorac
- Promoted: NK Dubrava; NK Primorac
- Matches: 479
- Goals: 1,310 (2.73 per match)

The 1992–93 Croatian Second Football League was the second season of second-division football in Croatia, and the first season to be played in a fall-spring format. NK Dubrava and NK Primorac won the north and south groups, respectively, and were granted licenses to participate the top flight 1993-94 1.HNL.

== North Group "Sjever" ==
NK Dubrava were promoted. NK Samobor finished third after receiving a new sponsor, the team's second highest league finish of all time.

Pos	Team	Pld	W	D	L	GF	GA	GD	Pts	Promotion or relegation
1	Dubrava (C, P)	30	18	8	4	49	19	+30	44	Promotion to Croatian First Football League
2	Marsonia Slavonski Brod	30	15	8	7	62	34	+28	38	
3	Samobor	30	13	11	6	50	30	+20	37	
4	Tresnjevka	30	14	7	9	50	31	+19	35	
5	Spačva Vinkovci	30	12	11	7	44	38	+6	35	
6	Olimpija Osijek	30	13	8	9	44	39	+5	34	
7	Špansko	30	13	5	12	63	50	+13	31	
8	Vrapče	30	12	6	12	38	38	0	30	
9	Bjelovar	30	12	5	13	50	47	+3	29	
10	Slaven Koprivnica	30	11	6	13	47	52	−5	28	
11	Mladost Cerić	30	11	6	13	42	58	−16	28	
12	Metalac Osijek	30	10	8	12	33	49	−16	28	
13	Jedinstvo Donji Miholjac	30	8	9	13	43	53	−10	25	
14	Karlovac	30	8	6	16	41	69	−28	22	
15	Čakovec (R)	30	9	3	18	46	62	−16	21	Relegation to Croatian Third Football League
16	Croatia Bogdanovci (R)	30	4	7	19	30	63	−33	15	Relegation to Croatian Third Football League

Source: RSSSF
(C) Champions; (P) Promoted; (R) Relegated

== South Group "Jug" ==
Pos	Team	Pld	W	D	L	GF	GA	GD	Pts	Promotion or relegation
1	Primorac Stobreč (C, P)	30	19	7	4	68	16	+52	45	Promotion to Croatian First Football League
2	NK Split	30	17	10	3	58	15	+43	44	
3	MAR Solin	30	16	11	3	39	20	+19	43	
4	Neretva Metković	30	12	11	7	41	28	+13	35	
5	Jadran Kaštel Sućurac	30	13	8	9	37	30	+7	34	
6	Neretvanac Opuzen	29	14	5	10	40	27	+13	33	
7	Orijent	29	13	6	10	44	34	+10	32	
8	Rovinj	30	11	9	10	38	33	+5	31	
9	Jadran Ploče	30	9	10	11	35	33	+2	28	
10	Nehaj Senj	30	10	5	15	24	52	−28	25	
11	Junak Sinj	30	9	7	14	33	43	−10	25	
12	Jadran Poreč	30	5	13	12	26	46	−20	23	
13	Imotski	30	9	5	16	36	53	−17	23	
14	Slaven Konavle (R)	30	7	8	15	21	57	−36	22	Relegation to Croatian Third Football League
15	Rudar Labin	30	5	8	17	23	56	−33	18	
16	Kraljevica (R)	30	5	7	18	21	46	−25	17	Relegation to Croatian Third Football League

Source: RSSSF
(C) Champions; (P) Promoted; (R) Relegated
