= HNK Dubrovnik 1919 =

HNK Dubrovnik
- Full name: HNK Dubrovnik 1919
- Founded: 1919
- Dissolved: 2015 (merged with GOŠK Dubrovnik)
- Ground: Gradski stadion Lapad
- Capacity: 3,000
- 2014–15: 1. ŽNL Dubrovnik-Neretva, 3rd
Home colours	Away colours

HNK Dubrovnik 1919 was a Croatian football club based in the city of Dubrovnik.

== History ==
The club was founded in 1922 under the name NK Jug. It was created by merging with another club Dubrovnik, hence there in 1919 in its name. During the 1951 merged with Borac and Željezničar and renamed NK Dubrovnik.

In 1978 again takes the original name NK Jug, and next year is merged with other urban club, NK GOŠK, becoming known as NK GOŠK-Jug. Under this name entered in the former Yugoslavia's 2nd Federal League and remain in it ten years ago.

Foundation of the Croatian football league, the club clinches 1. HNL, 19 February 1992 name was changed to HNK Dubrovnik. Later, the club sinks deeper into a serious crisis due to the 2nd League of Dubrovnik-Neretva County.

In August 2015, Dubrovnik 1919 was merged with the city rivals GOŠK and then was dissolved.

== Seasons ==
Season	League									Cup
Season	Division	P	W	D	L	F	A	Pts	Pos	Cup
1992	1. HNL	22	2	7	13	4	36	11	11th	
1992–93	1. HNL	30	9	7	14	24	37	25	14th	QF
1993–94	1. HNL	34	7	9	18	26	60	23	16th ↓	QF
1994–95	2. HNL South	32	18	8	6	60	28	62	2nd ↑	R2
1995–96	1. B HNL	28	14	3	11	39	29	45	3rd	R2
1996–97	1. B HNL	30	15	8	7	54	33	53	3rd ↓	QF
1997–98	2. HNL South	32	10	8	14	26	40	38	10th	R1
1998–99	3. HNL South	34	12	9	13	42	52	45	13th ↓	R1
1999–2000	1. ŽNL D-N	26	18	6	2	69	15	60	1st ↑	R1
2000–01	3. HNL South	28	12	6	10	45	24	42	7th	R1
2001–02	3. HNL South	30	10	9	11	34	42	39	12th	R1
2002–03	3. HNL South	28	10	6	12	37	47	36	8th	R1
2003–04	3. HNL South	30	11	3	16	32	45	36	14th ↓↓	
2004–05	2. ŽNL D-N									
2005–06	2. ŽNL D-N									
2006–07	2. ŽNL D-N	18						29	4th	
2007–08	2. ŽNL D-N	20						54	1st ↑	
2008–09	1. ŽNL D-N	18	12	2	4	40	19	38	1st ↑	
2009–10	4. HNL South D-N	22	13	3	6	47	24	42	3rd ↓	
2010–11	1. ŽNL D-N	21	11	5	5	38	29	38	3rd	
2011–12	1. ŽNL D-N	15	11	2	2	32	17	35	1st	
2012–13	1. ŽNL D-N ŽNS	15	9	2	4	33	21	29	1st	
2013–14	1. ŽNL D-N	23	10	3	10	40	46	33	7th	
2014–15	1. ŽNL D-N	22	12	2	8	43	30	39	3rd	
