= Neno Katulić =

Croatian footballer

Personal information
- Date of birth: 26 June 1975 (age 51)
- Place of birth: Zagreb, SFR Yugoslavia
- Height: 1.70 m (5 ft 7 in)
- Position: Forward

Senior career*
Years	Team	Apps	(Gls)
1993–1994	Radnik	16	(2)
1994–1996	Hrvatski Dragovoljac	27	(2)
1997	Marsonia	16	(10)
1997–2002	Hrvatski Dragovoljac	121	(15)
2002–2004	Inker	24	(7)
2004–2005	Rijeka	23	(5)
2005–2006	Croatia Sesvete	15	(2)
2006–2009	Weiz	50	(15)
2009	Trnje		
2009	Gorica	4	(2)
2010–2013	Polet Buševec		
- * Club domestic league appearances and goals as of 13:51, 7 March 2014 (UTC)

Neno Katulić (born 26 June 1975) is a retired Croatian football forward who last played in lower Croatian divisions. During his professional career he mainly played for Hrvatski Dragovoljac in Croatia’s Prva HNL, with a three-year stint in Austria.
