= Ivica Šangulin =

Croatian footballer (1937–2012)

Personal information
- Date of birth: 20 April 1937
- Place of birth: Biograd na Moru, Kingdom of Yugoslavia
- Date of death: 5 May 2012 (aged 75)
- Place of death: Rijeka, Croatia
- Position: Defender

Senior career*
Years	Team	Apps	(Gls)
1955–1961	Šibenik		
1961–1962	Dinamo Zagreb		
1962–1966	Rijeka	143	(0)
1966–1969	Hertha BSC	81	(2)
1969–1970	FV Wannsee	25	(0)
1970–1971	Tasmania Berlin	31	(3)

Managerial career
- 1973–1974: Rijeka
- 1983–1985: Šibenik
- 1986–1987: Zadar
- 1992–1994: Orijent
- 1994: Šibenik
- 1995–1997: Primorac Biograd
- * Club domestic league appearances and goals

Ivica Šangulin (20 April 1937 – 5 May 2012) was a Croatian football player and manager.

== Career ==
Born in Biograd na Moru, he spent his early years with Šibenik, before moving on to Dinamo Zagreb for one season. He left a big mark with HNK Rijeka, where he played for four years. He then moved to West Germany where he played for Hertha BSC for three seasons, before moving to lower division teams towards the end of his career. As a manager, he was in charge of several Croatian clubs.

== Honours ==
=== Player ===
Hertha BSC

- Regionalliga Berlin: 1966–67, 1967–68

Tasmania Berlin

- Regionalliga Berlin: 1970–71

=== Coach ===
NK Rijeka

- Yugoslav Second League: 1973–74

NK Orijent

- Druga HNL runner-up: 1993–94
