= 2004–05 Croatian Second Football League =

14th season of second level football

Druga HNL
- Season: 2004–05
- Champions: Cibalia (North Division); Novalja (South Division)
- Promoted: Cibalia
- Relegated: Valpovka; GOŠK Dubrovnik; Uskok Klis

The 2004–05 Druga HNL (also known as 2. HNL) season was the 14th season of Croatia's second level football since its establishment in 1992. The league was contested in two regional groups (North Division and South Division), with 12 clubs each.

== North Division ==
=== Clubs ===
Club	City / Town	Stadium	Capacity
Belišće	Belišće	Gradski stadion Belišće	4,000
Bjelovar	Bjelovar	Gradski stadion Bjelovar	4,000
Cibalia	Vinkovci	Stadion HNK Cibalia	10,000
Čakovec	Čakovec	Stadion SRC Mladost	8,000
Dilj	Vinkovci	Stadion NK Dilj	3,000
Grafičar Vodovod	Osijek	Podgrađe	4,500
Koprivnica	Koprivnica	Gradski stadion Koprivnica	4,000
Marsonia	Slavonski Brod	Gradski Stadion uz Savu	10,000
Metalac Osijek	Osijek	SC Bikara	1,500
Slavonija Požega	Požega	Gradski stadion Požega	4,000
Valpovka	Valpovo	Sportski park	1,000
Vukovar '91	Vukovar	Gradski stadion Borovo Naselje	6,000

=== First stage ===
Pos	Team	Pld	W	D	L	GF	GA	GD	Pts	Qualification
1	Cibalia (Note: Cibalia were docked 6 points due to debt to 1. FC Saarbrücken over the transfer of Mladen Bartolović)	22	14	6	2	43	13	+30	42	Qualification to play-off group
2	Čakovec	22	11	6	5	36	25	+11	39	Qualification to play-off group
3	Belišće	22	10	4	8	40	28	+12	34	Qualification to play-off group
4	Marsonia	22	10	4	8	29	24	+5	34	Qualification to play-off group
5	Metalac Osijek	22	9	6	7	34	25	+9	33	Qualification to play-off group
6	Dilj	22	9	5	8	23	26	−3	32	Qualification to play-off group
7	Slavonija Požega	22	9	4	9	26	34	−8	31	Qualification to play-out group
8	Koprivnica	22	8	5	9	30	33	−3	29	Qualification to play-out group
9	Bjelovar	22	7	6	9	36	36	0	27	Qualification to play-out group
10	Vukovar '91	22	7	5	10	23	30	−7	26	Qualification to play-out group
11	Grafičar Vodovod	22	4	5	13	28	44	−16	17	Qualification to play-out group
12	Valpovka	22	5	2	15	15	45	−30	17	Qualification to play-out group

Source: RSSSF.org
Rules for classification: 1) points; 2) goal difference; 3) number of goals scored.

==== Rounds 1–22 results ====
Home \ Away	BEL	BJE	CIB	ČAK	DILJ	GRV	KOP	MAR	MET	SLA	VAL	VUK
Belišće		1–1	3–0	4–0	0–1	5–3	2–2	2–0	3–2	2–0	0–1	4–0
Bjelovar	2–0		2–2	3–3	0–1	2–2	3–1	3–1	0–2	4–0	1–0	4–0
Cibalia	1–1	2–0		0–0	3–0	4–0	3–0	1–0	1–0	7–0	4–0	1–0
Čakovec	6–2	3–0	1–1		1–0	3–1	3–1	2–0	2–2	2–0	1–0	2–1
Dilj	1–5	3–3	0–1	2–1		2–1	1–0	3–2	1–1	3–0	2–0	0–2
Grafičar Vodovod	1–1	4–1	0–2	0–2	1–0		0–1	1–2	2–2	3–1	4–1	1–1
Koprivnica	2–1	0–1	1–1	1–1	1–0	3–1		0–3	0–0	2–2	5–2	6–1
Marsonia	1–0	2–1	1–1	4–1	1–1	1–0	1–2		3–0	1–0	2–0	1–1
Metalac Osijek	2–1	2–2	0–1	0–0	2–0	4–0	0–2	2–0		2–1	6–0	1–0
Slavonija Požega	2–1	3–2	1–0	1–0	1–1	3–1	4–0	1–0	3–1		1–2	0–0
Valpovka	0–1	1–0	1–3	1–2	0–1	1–1	1–0	2–2	0–3	0–2		2–1
Vukovar '91	0–1	3–1	2–4	1–0	0–0	2–1	2–0	0–1	3–0	0–0	3–0	

Source: RSSSF.org
Legend: Blue = home team win; Yellow = draw; Red = away team win.

=== Play-off Group ===
Pos	Team	Pld	W	D	L	GF	GA	GD	Pts	Qualification
1	Cibalia (Note: Cibalia were docked 6 points due to debt to 1. FC Saarbrücken over the transfer of Mladen Bartolović) (C, P)	32	21	8	3	65	23	+42	65	Qualification to promotion play-off
2	Marsonia	32	16	8	8	50	36	+14	56	
3	Čakovec	32	13	9	10	45	41	+4	48	
4	Belišće	32	12	7	13	48	41	+7	43	
5	Metalac Osijek	32	11	9	12	45	38	+7	42	
6	Dilj	32	11	8	13	31	41	−10	41	

Source: RSSSF.org
Rules for classification: 1) points; 2) goal difference; 3) number of goals scored.
(C) Champions; (P) Promoted

==== Rounds 23–32 results ====
Home \ Away	BEL	CIB	ČAK	DILJ	MAR	MET
Belišće		1–1	1–2	1–0	0–1	2–2
Cibalia	3–1		2–1	2–0	2–2	2–1
Čakovec	0–1	1–5		0–0	2–2	1–0
Dilj	2–1	0–3	2–1		2–2	1–1
Marsonia	2–0	3–1	1–1	2–1		2–1
Metalac Osijek	0–0	0–1	2–0	2–0	2–4	

Source: RSSSF.org
Legend: Blue = home team win; Yellow = draw; Red = away team win.

=== Play-out Group ===
Pos	Team	Pld	W	D	L	GF	GA	GD	Pts	Relegation
7	Koprivnica	32	12	8	12	50	48	+2	44	
8	Bjelovar	32	11	8	13	54	53	+1	41	
9	Slavonija Požega	32	12	4	16	37	57	−20	40	
10	Vukovar '91	32	10	9	13	37	46	−9	39	
11	Grafičar Vodovod	32	9	7	16	46	53	−7	34	
12	Valpovka (R)	32	10	3	19	29	60	−31	33	Relegation to Croatian Third Football League

Source: RSSSF.org
Rules for classification: 1) points; 2) goal difference; 3) number of goals scored.
(R) Relegated

==== Rounds 23–32 results ====
Home \ Away	BJE	GRV	KOP	SLA	VAL	VUK
Bjelovar		0–0	3–2	3–1	3–1	1–1
Grafičar Vodovod	2–1		1–2	2–1	0–2	5–0
Koprivnica	3–1	0–1		1–0	5–0	3–3
Slavonija Požega	3–2	1–6	3–1		1–0	0–3
Valpovka	3–2	1–0	2–2	3–0		1–0
Vukovar '91	1–2	1–1	1–1	2–1	2–1	

Source: RSSSF.org
Legend: Blue = home team win; Yellow = draw; Red = away team win.

== South Division ==
=== Clubs ===
Club	City / Town	Stadium	Capacity
Croatia Sesvete	Sesvete	Stadion ŠRC Sesvete	3,500
GOŠK Dubrovnik	Dubrovnik	Stadion Lapad	7,000
Hrvatski Dragovoljac	Zagreb	Stadion NŠC Stjepan Spajić	5,000
Imotski	Imotski	Stadion Gospin dolac	4,000
Mosor	Žrnovnica	Stadion Pricviće	3,000
Naftaš Ivanić Grad	Ivanić Grad	Sportski Park Zelenjak	2,000
Novalja	Novalja	Cissa Strasko	2,000
Pomorac	Kostrena	Stadion Žuknica	3,500
Segesta	Sisak	Gradski stadion Sisak	8,000
Solin Građa	Solin	Stadion pokraj Jadra	4,000
Šibenik	Šibenik	Stadion Šubićevac	8,000
Uskok Klis	Klis	Iza grada	2,000

=== First stage ===
Pos	Team	Pld	W	D	L	GF	GA	GD	Pts	Qualification
1	Hrvatski Dragovoljac	22	12	7	3	45	26	+19	43	Qualification to play-off group
2	Novalja	22	11	5	6	33	19	+14	38	Qualification to play-off group
3	Solin Građa	22	11	5	6	41	39	+2	38	Qualification to play-off group
4	Mosor	22	9	10	3	38	25	+13	37	Qualification to play-off group
5	Segesta	22	9	8	5	38	26	+12	35	Qualification to play-off group
6	Šibenik (Note: Šibenik were docked 3 points on demand of FIFA Executive Committee concerning the transfer of Denis Putnik to Jiangsu Sainty in 2001)	22	9	10	3	30	16	+14	34	Qualification to play-off group
7	Pomorac	22	9	4	9	30	29	+1	31	Qualification to play-out group
8	Naftaš Ivanić Grad	22	7	3	12	29	40	−11	24	Qualification to play-out group
9	Imotski	22	6	5	11	23	36	−13	23	Qualification to play-out group
10	Croatia Sesvete	22	6	3	13	27	38	−11	21	Qualification to play-out group
11	GOŠK Dubrovnik	22	5	5	12	17	41	−24	20	Qualification to play-out group
12	Uskok Klis	22	4	3	15	18	34	−16	15	Qualification to play-out group

Source: RSSSF.org
Rules for classification: 1) points; 2) goal difference; 3) number of goals scored.

==== Rounds 1–22 results ====
Home \ Away	SES	GOŠK	HRD	IMO	MOS	NIG	NOV	POM	SEG	SOL	ŠIB	USK
Croatia Sesvete		5–1	1–4	3–0	1–0	2–1	1–5	2–1	1–1	1–3	1–1	3–0
GOŠK Dubrovnik	2–0		0–5	2–2	0–0	0–3	1–0	0–2	1–1	2–0	2–2	2–1
Hrvatski Dragovoljac	1–1	3–0		4–1	2–2	2–1	2–1	2–2	2–1	4–0	0–0	2–0
Imotski	1–0	0–0	2–0		1–1	5–1	1–0	1–2	0–0	0–4	0–4	2–0
Mosor	2–1	3–1	4–1	2–1		4–0	1–1	2–1	2–2	0–0	2–5	1–0
Naftaš Ivanić	3–1	1–2	1–3	1–0	1–1		0–1	3–2	0–0	3–0	1–1	1–0
Novalja	2–0	3–0	1–1	3–1	0–0	3–1		0–0	2–0	1–2	1–0	1–0
Pomorac	2–0	2–0	0–1	2–1	3–2	0–1	0–3		1–0	2–2	1–1	2–1
Segesta	2–0	3–1	1–2	3–1	3–3	6–2	3–1	2–1		6–1	0–0	2–1
Solin Građa	4–3	2–0	2–2	3–1	1–4	3–2	2–3	2–1	3–0		3–1	2–1
Šibenik	1–0	2–0	3–0	0–0	0–0	1–0	2–0	2–1	1–1	1–1		2–0
Uskok Klis	1–0	1–0	2–2	1–2	1–2	3–2	1–1	1–2	0–1	1–1	2–1	

Source: RSSSF.org
Legend: Blue = home team win; Yellow = draw; Red = away team win.

=== Play-off Group ===
Pos	Team	Pld	W	D	L	GF	GA	GD	Pts	Qualification
1	Novalja (C)	32	17	8	7	51	29	+22	59	Qualification to promotion play-off
2	Hrvatski Dragovoljac	32	17	8	7	62	39	+23	59	
3	Solin Građa	32	14	8	10	54	53	+1	50	
4	Šibenik (Note: Šibenik were docked 3 points on demand of FIFA Executive Committee concerning the transfer of Denis Putnik to Jiangsu Sainty in 2001)	32	13	12	7	42	26	+16	48	
5	Segesta	32	12	12	8	51	38	+13	48	
6	Mosor	32	11	11	10	48	49	−1	44	

Source: RSSSF.org
Rules for classification: 1) points; 2) goal difference; 3) number of goals scored.
(C) Champions

==== Rounds 23–32 results ====
Home \ Away	HRD	MOS	NOV	SEG	SOL	ŠIB
Hrvatski Dragovoljac		4–2	2–3	2–1	2–1	1–1
Mosor	0–3		0–2	1–4	2–1	1–0
Novalja	1–0	4–1		1–1	1–1	2–1
Segesta	1–2	2–1	1–1		2–2	1–0
Solin Građa	1–0	1–1	1–3	2–0		2–0
Šibenik	2–1	2–1	2–0	0–0	3–1	

Source: RSSSF.org
Legend: Blue = home team win; Yellow = draw; Red = away team win.

=== Play-out Group ===
Pos	Team	Pld	W	D	L	GF	GA	GD	Pts	Qualification or relegation
7	Pomorac	32	13	7	12	37	36	+1	46	
8	Naftaš Ivanić Grad	32	12	4	16	44	52	−8	40	
9	Croatia Sesvete	32	10	8	14	41	47	−6	38	
10	Imotski	32	10	7	15	36	46	−10	37	
11	GOŠK Dubrovnik (R)	32	9	7	16	30	50	−20	34	Qualification to Relegation play-off
12	Uskok Klis (R)	32	5	6	21	27	58	−31	21	Relegation to Croatian Third Football League

Source: RSSSF.org
Rules for classification: 1) points; 2) goal difference; 3) number of goals scored.
(R) Relegated

==== Rounds 23–32 results ====
Home \ Away	SES	GOŠK	IMO	NIG	POM	USK
Croatia Sesvete		1–1	2–1	3–1	1–0	3–1
GOŠK Dubrovnik	2–1		3–1	2–0	0–0	5–1
Imotski	1–1	1–0		2–1	1–0	6–0
Naftaš Ivanić	1–1	1–0	2–0		3–1	3–1
Pomorac	0–0	1–0	1–0	1–0		1–1
Uskok Klis	1–1	2–0	0–0	1–3	1–2	

Source: RSSSF.org
Legend: Blue = home team win; Yellow = draw; Red = away team win.

== Promotion play-off ==
Cibalia and Novalja, winners of the North and South Division, qualified for a two-legged promotion play-off, which took place on 24 and 28 May 2005. Cibalia won the tie 5–1 on aggregate score, thereby earning promotion to the Prva HNL for the following season.

24 May 2005

Cibalia	4–0	Novalja
Andričević 26'; Knežević 32', 60'; Križanović 74'	Report (in Croatian)

Stadion HNK Cibalia, Vinkovci
Attendance: 4,500
Referee: Vlado Svilokos (Sisak)

28 May 2005

Novalja	1–1	Cibalia
Marić 83'	Report (in Croatian)	Pavličić 35'

Igralište Cissa-Straško, Novalja
Attendance: 100
Referee: Ivan Novak (Varaždin)

However, Novalja had another chance for promotion, as the losing team from the promotion play-off played another two-legged tie against the 11th placed team of Prva HNL, Međimurje. Međimurje won 3–1 on aggregate.

== See also ==
- 2004–05 Prva HNL
- 2004–05 Croatian Cup
