= Miroslav Buljan =

Croatian footballer and manager (born 1955)

Personal information
- Date of birth: 18 December 1955 (age 70)
- Place of birth: Slavonski Brod, FPR Yugoslavia
- Position: Midfielder

Youth career
- 1964–1975: Marsonia

Senior career*
Years	Team	Apps	(Gls)
1975–1983	Marsonia		

Managerial career
- 1996: Marsonia
- 1997–1998: Slaven Belupo
- 1999–2001: Široki Brijeg
- 2002–2003: Sloga
- 2004–2005: Karlovac
- 2005–2006: Ogulin
- 2006–2007: Belišće
- 2007–2008: Koprivnica
- 2008: Toronto Croatia
- 2010: MV Croatia
- 2011: King Faisal Babes
- 2012: Marsonia 1909
- * Club domestic league appearances and goals

Miroslav Buljan (born 18 December 1955) is a Croatian retired professional football manager and former player. He particularly managed various Croatian clubs in the 1.HNL, 2.HNL, and 3.HNL, as well as Široki Brijeg in the Bosnian Premier League.

== Playing career ==
Born in Slavonski Brod, SFR Yugoslavia, present day Croatia, Buljan began playing football in the youth levels of hometown club Marsonia in 1964. In 1974, he joined the youth team of Dinamo Zagreb, but a year later, in 1975, he signed his first professional contract with Marsonia, and played at the club until 1983.

== Managerial career ==
During his tenure as a player with Marsonia, Buljan managed to achieve a UEFA coaching license, and received his first coaching experience in 1996 with Marsonia in the 1. HNL. Following the relegation of Marsonia he remained in the top tier after managing Slaven Belupo in 1997. In 1999, Buljan went to Bosnia and Herzegovina t0 manage Široki Brijeg.

After two seasons at Šrioki Brijeg, he returned to Croatia where he had several managerial stints in the 3. HNL with Sloga, Karlovac, and Ogulin. In 2006, Buljan began managing in the 2. HNL with Belišće, and with Koprivnica in 2007. He went abroad once more in 2008 to the Canadian Soccer League to manage Toronto Croatia. In 2010, he returned to the 2. HNL where he managed MV Croatia. Buljan was appointed manager in 2011 of King Faisal Babes in the Ghanaian Premier League. After a season in Africa, he returned to MV Croatia and managed the club in 2012.
