= HNK Orijent =

Croatian football club

- Full name: Hrvatski nogometni klub Orijent
- Nicknames: Sušačani, Crveni s Krimeje
- Founded: 14 June 1919; 107 years ago (as NK Orijent)
- Ground: Stadion Krimeja
- Capacity: 3,000
- Chairman: Saša Matijaš
- Manager: Alen Šušnić
- League: First League (II)
- 2025–26: 9th of 12
- Website: www.nk-orijent.com
Home colours	Away colours

HNK Orijent is a professional football club from Sušak, the eastern part of the city of Rijeka, Croatia. The club was established under the name Orient in 1919. They currently compete in the 1. NL, the second tier of the Croatian football league system. It is a phoenix club of NK Orijent which ceased operations in 2014 due to financial difficulties. The club was resurrected that same year under the new name, HNK Orijent 1919. In September 2022, the club assembly voted to change the name to the original HNK Orijent.

== History ==
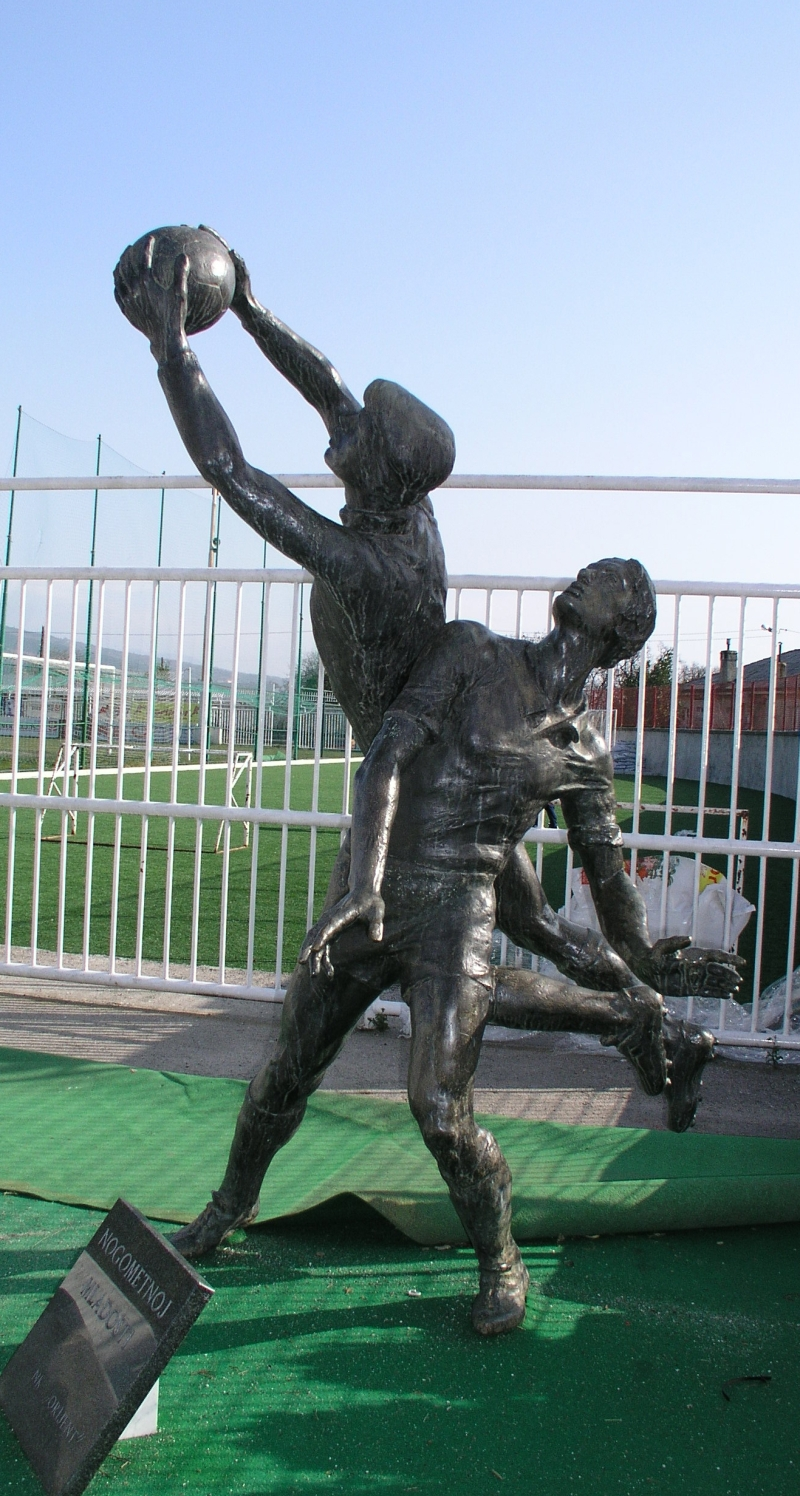
"Monument to football youth" at the entrance of the HNK Orijent soccer field in Rijeka, Croatia

=== Orient ===
The club was founded in Sušak in 1919, under the name Jugoslavenski Športski Klub Orient. At that time, Sušak was predominantly Croatian, while Fiume, the western part of the city, was predominantly Italian. The club legend says that one of the club's founders saw a ship named Orient at the New York Harbor during his journey through the United States and, upon return, suggested the new club to be named Orient and his suggestion was accepted. Although Orijent spent most of its history playing in lower tiers of Yugoslav and Croatian football, it was and still is popular among Sušak's population.

The club was disbanded by the communists in 1945 and re-established as FD Jedinstvo. Its greatest success came in 1969, when they were the champions of Yugoslav Second League's Division West but were unable to win promotion through playoff. In the early 1970s, Orijent contested a total of eight derbies with city rivals Rijeka. Other notable successes include quarter-finals of Yugoslav Cup in 1980–81 and 1982–83. Orijent played top-tier football only once, in season 1996–97, when they finished 14th and were relegated.

In June 2014, the club was liquidated due to its inability to service mounting debts. Shortly thereafter, the club was re-established and admitted to the fifth tier of the Croatian football league system for the start of the 2014–15 campaign. Over the following five seasons, they gained promotion on three occasions, reaching the Croatian Second Football League starting with the 2019–20 campaign.

=== Names ===
As regimes changed, Orijent was often forced to change its name. At various stages of its history, the club was known as Jedinstvo, Primorac, Primorje, and Budućnost. Finally, from 1953 onward, the club has been carrying the original name, Orijent, in various forms (NK Orijent, HNK Orijent 1919, HNK Orijent).

After the liquidation in 2014, the club was re-established as HNK Orijent 1919. In September 2022, the club assembly voted to rename the club by leaving out 1919, however, the original year of formation would remain visible in the crest. The new name entered the official HNS register on 6 October 2022.

== Honours ==
- Yugoslav Second League Winner (1):
  - 1968–69 (West)
- Croatian Republic Football League Winner (4):
  - 1967–68 (West), 1983–84 (West), 1984–85 (West), 1985–86 (West)
- Druga HNL Runner-up (2):
  - 1993–94 (South), 1994–95 (West)
- Prva B HNL Runner-up (1):
  - 1995–96
- First League of Primorje-Gorski Kotar County Winner (1):
  - 2014–15
- Yugoslav Cup Quarter-final (2):
  - 1980–81, 1982–83
- Croatian Football Cup Quarter-final (1):
  - 1997–98

== Current squad ==
As of 10 October 2026

Note: Flags indicate national team as defined under FIFA eligibility rules; some limited exceptions apply. Players may hold more than one non-FIFA nationality.

No.	Pos.	Nation	Player
1	GK	CRO	Domagoj Ivan Marić (co-operation loan with Rijeka)
2	DF	CRO	Vanja Šare
3	DF	CRO	Patrik Majdandžić
4	DF	CRO	Domagoj Prpić
5	DF	CRO	David Zubović
6	MF	CRO	Adrijan Ćumurdžić
9	FW	CRO	Miroslav Iličić
10	MF	CRO	Franko Andrijašević
12	GK	CRO	Niko Vučetić
13	FW	CRO	Noa Aron Stašić
14	DF	CRO	Roko Valinčić (co-operation loan with Rijeka)

No.	Pos.	Nation	Player
15	FW	CRO	David Ružić
16	DF	CRO	Edi Vinarš
17	FW	NGR	Charles Adah Agada (on loan from Istra 1961)
18	FW	CMR	Marcel Sodwe Lissouck
20	FW	CRO	Jakov Bilajac
22	MF	CRO	Frane Čirjak
24	MF	CRO	Fran Peček (on loan from Osijek)
25	MF	GAM	Talib Sibi (co-operation loan with Rijeka)
26	MF	BIH	Edin Biber
27	DF	CRO	Luka Matić
28	DF	CRO	Mario Tadejević

=== Dual registration ===
Note: Flags indicate national team as defined under FIFA eligibility rules; some limited exceptions apply. Players may hold more than one non-FIFA nationality.

No. / Pos. / Nation / Player; 29 / FW / CRO / Matej Radaić (at Grobničan)	No. / Pos. / Nation / Player; 45 / GK / CRO / Gabriel Pehar (at Naprijed Hreljin)

== Notable managers ==
- (Socialist Federal Republic of Yugoslavia) Ivan "Ðalma" Marković (1962)
- ? (1962–1968)
- (Socialist Federal Republic of Yugoslavia) Ivan "Ðalma" Marković (1968–1969)
- ? (1969–1973)
- (Socialist Federal Republic of Yugoslavia) Marcel Žigante (1973–1974)
- ? (1974–1979)
- (Socialist Federal Republic of Yugoslavia) Josip Skoblar (1979–1981)
- ? (1981–1982)
- (Socialist Federal Republic of Yugoslavia) Ivan "Ðalma" Marković (1982–1984)
- ? (1984–1987)
- (Socialist Federal Republic of Yugoslavia) Marijan Brnčić (1987– 1989)
- (Socialist Federal Republic of Yugoslavia) Miloš Hrstić (1988–1989)
- (Socialist Federal Republic of Yugoslavia) Velimir Naumović (1989–1991)
- (Croatia) Mladen Vranković (1991–1992)
- (Croatia) Ivica Šangulin (1992–1994)
- ? (1994–1995)
- (Croatia) Predrag Stilinović (1995–1996)
- (Croatia) Boris Tičić (1996–1997)
- (Croatia) Ilija Lončarević (1997)
- (Croatia) Drago Mamić (1997–1998)
- ? (1998–1999)
- (Croatia) Rodion Gačanin (1999–2000)
- ? (2000–2006)
- (Croatia) Mladen Mladenović (2006–2008)
- ? (2008–2016)
- (Croatia) Elvis Brajković (2016)
- (Croatia) Danilo Butorović (2016–2018)
- (Croatia) Fausto Budicin (2019–2020)
- (Croatia) Damir Milinović (2020–2021)
- (Croatia) Edo Flego (2021–2022)
- (Croatia) Jure Srzić (2022)
- (Croatia) Fausto Budicin (2022–2023)
- (Croatia) Slobodan Grubor (2023–2024)
- (Croatia) Alen Šušnić (2024–present)

== Seasons ==
Season	League									Cup
Season	Division	P	W	D	L	F	A	Pts	Pos	Cup
NK ORIJENT
1966–67	3. Div	26	13	5	8	57	29	31	4th	
1967–68	3. Div	30	22	6	2	95	26	50	1st ↑	
1968–69	2. Div	30	23	3	4	70	27	49	1st	
1969–70	2. Div	30	16	3	11	48	30	35	4th	R2
1970–71	2. Div	30	9	10	11	36	38	28	7th	
1971–72	2. Div	34	15	8	11	63	47	38	5th	
1972–73	2. Div	34	10	12	12	45	57	31	12th ↓	
1973–74	3. Div	32	7	14	11	30	41	28	15th ↓	
1974–75	4. Div								1st ↑	
1975–76	3. Div	22	4	8	10	25	26	16	11th	
1976–77	3. Div	26	12	8	6	36	25	32	3rd	
1977–78	3. Div	26	13	7	6	30	18	33	3rd	
1978–79	3. Div	26	14	6	6	33	18	34	2nd	
1979–80	3. Div	30	13	6	11	42	30	32	6th	
1980–81	3. Div	30	12	9	9	36	22	33	3rd	QF
1981–82	3. Div	30	15	7	8	44	26	37	3rd	
1982–83	3. Div	30	12	9	9	47	35	33	5th	QF
1983–84	3. Div	26	21	5	0	55	8	47	1st	
1984–85	3. Div	26	20	5	1	74	9	45	1st	
1985–86	3. Div	26	20	4	2	73	10	44	1st	
1986–87	3. Div	26	16	6	4	49	16	38	2nd	
1987–88	3. Div	30	13	6	11	44	32	32	4th	
1988–89	3. Div	34	11	9 (5)	14	34	33	27	13th	
1989–90	3. Div	34	10	9 (7)	15	37	43	27	15th	R1
1990–91	3. Div	34	13	5 (4)	16	31	45	30	11th	
1992	2. HNL West	12	4	3	5	14	13	11	3rd	
1992–93	2. HNL South	29	13	6	10	44	34	32	7th	R1
1993–94	2. HNL South	30	21	8	1	62	15	50	2nd	R1
1994–95	2. HNL West	36	24	8	4	86	19	80	2nd ↑	
1995–96	1.B HNL	28	15	4	9	45	34	49	2nd ↑	
1996–97	1. HNL	30	5	11	14	28	53	26	14th ↓	R1
1997–98	2. HNL West	30	21	5	4	63	15	68	3rd	QF
1998–99	2. HNL	36	13	9	14	39	48	48	13th	
1999–2000	2. HNL	32	10	11	11	37	41	41	9th	
2000–01	2. HNL	34	13	8	13	40	40	47	10th	R2
2001–02	2. HNL South	30	14	4	12	35	37	46	6th	
2002–03	2. HNL South	32	12	6	14	36	48	42	8th	R1
2003–04	2. HNL South	32	2	7	23	23	62	13	12th ↓	
2004–05	3. HNL West	30	8	10	12	26	47	34	14th	
2005–06	3. HNL West	30	15	9	6	60	35	54	4th	
2006–07	3. HNL West	34	13	7	14	44	53	46	13th	
2007–08	3. HNL West	34	10	11	13	39	36	41	13th	
2008–09	3. HNL West	34	12	8	14	45	41	42	13th	R1
2009–10	3. HNL West	34	10	14	10	47	44	44	11th	R1
2010–11	3. HNL West	34	12	6	16	40	47	42	11th	
2011–12	3. HNL West	34	9	12	13	38	48	39	14th	
2012–13	3. HNL West	30	13	4	13	46	45	43	8th	
2013–14	3. HNL West	28	13	4	11	35	43	43	6th	
HNK ORIJENT 1919
2014–15	1. ŽNL	28	18	5	1	65	18	59	1st ↑	
2015–16	4. HNL Rijeka	30	11	7	12	42	45	40	8th	
2016–17	4. HNL Rijeka	30	10	12	8	49	36	42	8th	
2017–18	4. HNL Rijeka	29	20	4	5	58	24	64	2nd ↑	
2018–19	3. HNL West	34	21	5	8	72	47	68	3rd ↑	
2019–20	2. HNL	19	9	6	4	26	23	33	3rd	
2020–21	2. HNL	34	12	9	13	52	49	45	11th	
2021–22	2. HNL	30	12	4	14	44	49	40	9th	R1
HNK ORIJENT
2022–23	1. NL	33	10	13	10	45	45	43	6th	
2023–24	1. NL	33	7	12	14	34	48	33	11th	
2024–25	1. NL	33	14	14	5	46	31	56	3rd	PR
2025–26	1. NL	33	9	11	13	40	41	38	9th	
