= 1993–94 Croatian Second Football League =

Druga HNL
- Season: 1993–94
- Champions: Marsonia (North Division); Neretva (South Division)
- Promoted: Marsonia; Neretva
- Relegated: PIK Vrbovec

The 1993–94 Druga HNL (also known as 2. HNL) season was the 3rd season of Croatia's second-level football since its establishment in 1992. The league was contested in two regional groups (North Division and South Division), with 16 clubs each.

== North Division ==
Pos	Team	Pld	W	D	L	GF	GA	GD	Pts	Promotion or relegation
1	Marsonia (C, P)	30	19	7	4	57	16	+41	45	Promotion to Croatian First Football League
2	Samobor	30	16	8	6	57	26	+31	40	
3	Špansko	30	16	5	9	51	25	+26	37	
4	Spačva	30	12	10	8	36	31	+5	34	
5	Croatia Đakovo	30	13	8	9	27	29	−2	34	
6	Slaven Bilokalnik	30	14	5	11	53	38	+15	33	
7	Bjelovar	30	13	7	10	34	36	−2	33	
8	Mladost Cestorad	30	13	6	11	51	44	+7	32	
9	Metalac OLT	30	11	4	15	43	55	−12	26	
10	Karlovac	30	10	6	14	34	46	−12	26	
11	Trešnjevka	30	9	7	14	33	46	−13	25	
12	Vrapče	30	9	7	14	32	47	−15	25	
13	Jedinstvo Donji Miholjac	30	8	8	14	31	46	−15	24	
14	Olimpija Osijek	30	8	7	15	33	48	−15	23	
15	Budućnost Hodošan	30	9	4	17	34	55	−21	22	
16	PIK Vrbovec (R)	30	8	5	17	32	48	−16	21	Relegation to Croatian Third Football League

Source: RSSSF.org
Rules for classification: 1) points; 2) goal difference; 3) number of goals scored.
(C) Champions; (P) Promoted; (R) Relegated

== South Division ==
Pos	Team	Pld	W	D	L	GF	GA	GD	Pts	Promotion or relegation
1	Neretva (C, P)	30	22	7	1	60	15	+45	51	Promotion to Croatian First Football League
2	Orijent	30	21	8	1	62	15	+47	50	
3	Jadran Poreč	30	14	9	7	40	26	+14	37	
4	Jadran Kaštel Sućurac	30	13	9	8	41	31	+10	35	
5	Rovinj	30	13	6	11	37	39	−2	32	
6	RNK Split	30	12	6	12	53	42	+11	30	
7	Uskok Klis	30	11	8	11	36	33	+3	30	
8	Croatia Imotski	30	11	8	11	40	38	+2	30	
9	Neretvanac	30	11	6	13	29	36	−7	28	
10	Rudar Labin	30	9	10	11	21	28	−7	28	
11	Jadran NGB	30	11	3	16	37	44	−7	25	
12	Solin	30	6	12	12	35	39	−4	24	
13	Junak	30	7	8	15	35	52	−17	22	
14	Uljanik	30	7	7	16	21	43	−22	21	
15	Prevlaka	30	5	11	14	27	62	−35	21	
16	Nehaj	30	5	6	19	21	52	−31	16	

Source: RSSSF.org
Rules for classification: 1) points; 2) goal difference; 3) number of goals scored.
(C) Champions; (P) Promoted

== See also ==
- 1993–94 Prva HNL
- 1993–94 Croatian Cup
