= 1995–96 Croatian First Football League =

1. HNL
- Season: 1995–96
- Dates: 13 August 1995 – 26 May 1996
- Champions: Croatia Zagreb; 2nd Croatian title 6th domestic title
- UEFA Cup: Croatia Zagreb; Hajduk Split
- Cup Winners' Cup: Varteks
- Intertoto Cup: Segesta
- Matches: 364
- Goals: 952 (2.62 per match)
- Top goalscorer: Igor Cvitanović (19)
- Biggest home win: Croatia Zagreb 6–0 Hrvatski Dragovoljac; Segesta 6–0 Rijeka
- Biggest away win: NK Zagreb 1–6 Hajduk Split
- Highest scoring: Osijek 5–3 Hajduk Split; Rijeka 4–4 Inker Zaprešić; Rijeka 4–4 Cibalia
- Average attendance: 2,612

The 1995-96 Croatian First Football League, also known as 1. HNL, was the fifth season of the Croatian top-level league since its establishment. The season started on 13 August 1995 and concluded on 26 May 1996. This was the first season to feature separate A- and B- leagues, with a complicated two-stage format to the season.

After the HNS changed plans during the course of the season, no relegation took place. Instead, 1-A and 1-B were expanded to 16 teams each the following season, with Zadar and Orijent Rijeka joining the teams from the championship group and the Prva A HNL play-off group in the 1-A division for the 1996-97 season.

== First stage ==
=== Prva A HNL ===
Pos	Team	Pld	W	D	L	GF	GA	GD	Pts	Qualification
1	Croatia Zagreb	22	14	5	3	46	13	+33	47	Qualification to championship group
2	Hajduk Split	22	12	6	4	41	19	+22	42	Qualification to championship group
3	Osijek	22	12	4	6	38	19	+19	40	Qualification to championship group
4	Varteks	22	11	6	5	29	19	+10	39	Qualification to championship group
5	NK Zagreb	22	7	8	7	24	25	−1	29	Qualification to championship group
6	Segesta	22	8	4	10	32	35	−3	28	Qualification to Prva A HNL play-off
7	Cibalia	22	6	9	7	26	37	−11	27 (Note: Head-to-head points: Cibalia 8 pts, Inker 5 pts, Šibenik 3 pts.)	Qualification to Prva A HNL play-off
8	Inker Zaprešić	22	7	6	9	28	38	−10	27	Qualification to Prva A HNL play-off
9	Šibenik	22	7	6	9	25	28	−3	27	Qualification to Prva A HNL play-off
10	Marsonia	22	6	3	13	14	33	−19	21	Qualification to Prva A HNL play-off
11	Rijeka	22	4	5	13	25	42	−17	17 (Note: Head-to-head record: Rijeka–Istra Pula 4–0, Istra Pula–Rijeka 0–1.)	Qualification to Prva A HNL play-off
12	Istra Pula	22	3	8	11	16	36	−20	17	Qualification to Prva A HNL play-off

Source: RSSSF.org
Rules for classification: 1st points; 2nd head-to-head points; 3rd goal difference 4th goals scored.

==== Rounds 1–22 results ====
Home \ Away	CIB	CZG	HAJ	INK	IST	MAR	OSI	RIJ	SEG	ŠIB	VAR	ZAG
Cibalia		2–2	2–4	2–2	1–1	0–0	2–0	1–1	2–1	2–1	1–0	2–1
Croatia Zagreb	3–0		1–0	5–1	4–0	5–0	2–0	2–0	4–0	2–1	2–0	2–0
Hajduk Split	4–1	2–1		3–1	5–0	3–0	2–0	1–0	3–1	0–0	0–0	2–1
Inker Zaprešić	1–1	1–1	0–0		3–2	0–2	0–3	3–1	2–4	2–0	0–2	0–1
Istra Pula	0–0	1–0	3–1	0–1		0–0	0–0	0–1	1–3	2–2	1–1	1–1
Marsonia	2–1	0–3	0–0	0–1	0–3		0–2	0–1	3–1	2–0	1–2	1–2
Osijek	4–0	1–2	5–3	1–1	1–0	0–2		1–0	4–0	4–1	1–0	2–2
Rijeka	4–4	1–1	0–3	4–4	4–0	0–1	0–2		0–1	3–1	2–2	1–2
Segesta	3–1	1–0	1–1	0–1	3–0	2–0	0–4	6–0		2–2	1–2	2–2
Šibenik	0–1	0–0	0–0	3–1	2–0	4–0	1–1	2–1	2–0		1–0	1–0
Varteks	3–0	1–1	0–3	3–1	2–0	2–0	1–0	2–1	1–0	3–1		0–0
NK Zagreb	0–0	1–3	2–1	0–2	1–1	1–0	0–2	3–0	0–0	2–0	2–2	

Source: RSSSF.org
Legend: Blue = home team win; Yellow = draw; Red = away team win.

=== Prva B HNL ===
Pos	Team	Pld	W	D	L	GF	GA	GD	Pts	Qualification
1	Hrvatski Dragovoljac	18	13	2	3	30	11	+19	41	Qualification to championship group
2	Mladost 127	18	12	2	4	27	11	+16	38	Qualification to Prva A HNL play-off
3	Zadar	18	9	5	4	24	13	+11	32	Qualification to Prva B HNL play-off
4	Orijent	18	9	2	7	29	24	+5	29	Qualification to Prva B HNL play-off
5	Neretva	18	8	3	7	21	17	+4	27	Qualification to Prva B HNL play-off
6	Slavonija Požega	18	6	4	8	26	26	0	22 (Note: Head-to-head record: Slavonija Požega–Dubrovnik 1–0, Dubrovnik–Slavonija Požega 1–0.)	Qualification to Prva B HNL play-off
7	Dubrovnik	18	6	4	8	15	15	0	22	Qualification to Prva B HNL play-off
8	Belišće	18	5	4	9	20	26	−6	19	Qualification to Prva B HNL play-off
9	Primorac	18	5	2	11	14	33	−19	17	Qualification to Prva B HNL play-off
10	Uskok Klis	18	2	2	14	9	39	−30	8	Qualification to Prva B HNL play-off

Source: RSSSF.org
Rules for classification: 1st points; 2nd head-to-head points; 3rd goal difference 4th goals scored.

==== Rounds 1–20 results ====
Home \ Away	BEL	DBK	HRD	MLA	NER	ORI	PRI	SLP	USK	ZAD
Belišće		1–1	1–2	0–2	1–0	2–1	2–0	0–0	4–1	3–1
Dubrovnik	1–0		1–1	0–1	1–0	1–0	4–0	1–0	2–0	1–1
Hrvatski Dragovoljac	3–1	1–0		0–3	2–0	3–1	3–0	1–0	3–0	1–0
Mladost 127	1–0	2–0	0–1		0–1	4–0	2–1	1–1	3–1	3–1
Neretva	2–1	1–1	2–0	1–0		2–2	3–0	1–0	2–1	0–1
Orijent	4–0	1–0	0–1	2–0	3–1		4–1	2–1	2–0	1–0
Primorac	2–1	2–0	1–0	0–1	1–0	0–0		3–4	2–1	0–1
Slavonija Požega	3–3	1–0	0–3	1–2	3–2	4–1	4–0		2–0	1–1
Uskok Klis	0–0	1–0	0–4	1–2	0–3	1–5	1–1	1–0		0–1
Zadar	2–0	2–1	1–1	0–0	0–0	3–0	2–0	4–1	3–0	

Source: RSSSF.org
Legend: Blue = home team win; Yellow = draw; Red = away team win.

== Second stage ==
=== Championship group ===
Pos	Team	Pld	W	D	L	GF	GA	GD	Pts	Qualification
1	Croatia Zagreb (C)	10	7	0	3	28	14	+14	26	Qualification to UEFA Cup preliminary round
2	Hajduk Split	10	7	1	2	25	14	+11	26	Qualification to UEFA Cup preliminary round
3	Varteks	10	7	1	2	15	7	+8	24	Qualification to Cup Winners' Cup qualifying round
4	Osijek	10	4	0	6	13	13	0	15	
5	Hrvatski Dragovoljac	10	1	3	6	8	23	−15	7	
6	NK Zagreb	10	1	1	8	7	25	−18	5	

Source: RSSSF.org
Rules for classification: 1st points; 2nd head-to-head points; 3rd goal difference 4th goals scored.
(C) Champions

==== Rounds 23–32 results ====
Home \ Away	CZG	HAJ	HRD	OSI	VAR	ZAG
Croatia Zagreb		4–1	6–0	2–1	3–4	5–1
Hajduk Split	3–2		5–1	2–0	1–0	2–1
Hrvatski Dragovoljac	0–1	2–2		2–1	0–1	1–2
Osijek	1–2	2–3	3–0		1–0	1–0
Varteks	2–0	1–0	1–1	2–1		2–0
NK Zagreb	1–3	1–6	1–1	0–2	0–2	

Source: RSSSF.org
Legend: Blue = home team win; Yellow = draw; Red = away team win.

=== Prva A HNL play-off ===
Pos	Team	Pld	W	D	L	GF	GA	GD	Pts	Qualification
1	Šibenik	14	8	0	6	19	15	+4	28	
2	Segesta	14	6	3	5	19	18	+1	28	Qualification to Intertoto Cup group stage
3	Rijeka	14	7	3	4	21	14	+7	26	
4	Mladost 127	14	7	3	4	22	14	+8	25	
5	Istra Pula	14	7	2	5	17	17	0	24	
6	Cibalia	14	5	3	6	17	18	−1	24	
7	Inker Zaprešić	14	2	5	7	10	15	−5	16	
8	Marsonia	14	3	3	8	12	26	−14	15	

Source: RSSSF.org
Rules for classification: 1st points; 2nd head-to-head points; 3rd goal difference 4th goals scored.

==== Results ====
Home \ Away	CIB	INK	IST	MAR	MLA	RIJ	SEG	ŠIB
Cibalia		0–0	1–0	2–1	2–1	2–2	4–1	3–1
Inker Zaprešić	3–0		1–1	1–2	1–1	2–0	0–0	0–1
Istra Pula	1–0	2–1		4–1	1–0	1–0	1–0	2–0
Marsonia	1–1	0–0	1–1		0–3	1–0	0–3	3–2
Mladost 127	2–1	3–1	3–1	4–0		0–0	1–0	2–0
Rijeka	2–0	2–0	4–1	2–1	2–0		2–0	2–0
Segesta	2–1	1–0	4–1	2–1	1–1	3–3		2–1
Šibenik	1–0	2–0	1–0	1–0	4–1	3–0	2–0	

Source: RSSSF.org
Legend: Blue = home team win; Yellow = draw; Red = away team win.

=== Prva B HNL play-off ===
Pos	Team	Pld	W	D	L	GF	GA	GD	Pts	Qualification
1	Zadar	28	16	5	7	44	25	+19	53	Placed in Prva A HNL
2	Orijent	28	15	4	9	45	34	+11	49	Placed in Prva A HNL
3	Dubrovnik	28	14	3	11	39	29	+10	45	Placed in Prva B HNL
4	Belišće	28	11	8	9	40	37	+3	41	Placed in Prva B HNL
5	Slavonija Požega	28	12	5	11	39	43	−4	41	Placed in Prva B HNL
6	Neretva	28	10	7	11	36	30	+6	37	Placed in Prva B HNL
7	Primorac	28	8	4	16	35	52	−17	28	Placed in Prva B HNL
8	Uskok Klis	28	6	4	18	21	49	−28	22	Placed in Prva B HNL

Source: RSSSF.org
Rules for classification: 1st points; 2nd head-to-head points; 3rd goal difference 4th goals scored

==== Results ====
Home \ Away	BEL	DBK	NER	ORI	PRI	SLP	USK	ZAD
Belišće		3–1	2–2	3–1	2–1	3–0	1–1	1–0
Dubrovnik	3–0		1–0	3–1	4–2	3–1	2–1	2–1
Neretva	1–1	2–1		2–0	1–1	1–2	2–3	3–0
Orijent	3–2	2–1	1–0		3–1	1–2	1–0	1–1
Primorac	2–1	2–0	1–2	1–1		7–1	1–2	2–0
Slavonija Požega	0–0	2–0	0–0	1–3	1–0		1–0	1–0
Uskok Klis	1–2	0–3	0–3	0–1	2–1	2–1		0–1
Zadar	3–1	2–1	2–0	1–0	5–1	4–2	2–2	

Source: RSSSF.org
Legend: Blue = home team win; Yellow = draw; Red = away team win.

== Top goalscorers ==
Rank	Player	Club	Goals
1	(Croatia) Igor Cvitanović	Croatia Zagreb	19
2	(Croatia) Nenad Pralija	Hajduk Split	17
2	(Croatia) Igor Pamić	Osijek	17
2	(Croatia) Davor Vugrinec	Varteks	17
5	(Croatia) Hari Vukas	Segesta	16
6	(Bosnia and Herzegovina) Senad Brkić	Rijeka	15
7	(Croatia) Vladimir Petrović	Segesta	12
7	(Australia) Mark Viduka	Croatia Zagreb	12
7	(Croatia) Renato Jurčec	Hajduk Split	12
10	(Croatia) Elvis Scoria	Istra Pula	11
10	(Croatia) Mate Baturina	Šibenik	11

== See also ==
- 1995–96 Croatian Second Football League
- 1995–96 Croatian Football Cup

== References and notes ==
- UEFA Site
- http://rsssf.org/tablesk/kroa96.html
