= 1995–96 Croatian Football Cup =

Tournament details
- Country: Croatia
- Teams: 32

Final positions
- Champions: Croatia Zagreb (2nd title)
- Runners-up: Varteks

Tournament statistics
- Top goal scorer: Mark Viduka (12)

The 1995–96 Croatian Football Cup was the fifth edition of Croatia's football knockout competition. Hajduk Split were the defending champions, and the cup was won by Croatia Zagreb.

== Calendar ==
Round	Main date	Number of fixtures	Clubs	New entries this round
First round	First legs 15 and 16 August 1995, Second legs 3 and 6 September 1995	32	32 → 16	None
Second round	First legs 10 and 11 October 1995, Second legs 24 and 25 October 1995	16	16 → 8	None
Quarter-finals	First legs 6 March 1996, Second legs 20 and 27 March 1996	8	8 → 4	None
Semi-finals	First legs 3 April 1996, Second legs 17 April 1996	4	4 → 2	None
Final	First leg 1 May 1996, Second leg 16 May 1996	2	2 → 1	None

== First round ==
Team 1	Agg.	Team 2	1st leg	2nd leg
MIV Sračinec	1–21	Croatia Zagreb	0–11	1–10
Pomorac Kostrena	1–3	Hajduk Split	0–2	1–1
PIK Vrbovec	0–10	Inker Zaprešić	0–3	0–7
Varteks	9–0	Jedinstvo Donji Miholjac	5–0	4–0
Hrvatski Dragovoljac	2–3	Zadar	2–0	0–3
Rovinj	0–12	Belišće	0–5	0–7
Marsonia	4–0	Istra Pula	3–0	1–0
Neretva	4–3	Bjelovar	4–1	0–2
Slaven Belupo	1–1 (4–5 p)	Croatia Đakovo	1–0	0–1
Čakovec Union	3–3 (a)	Cibalia	3–1	0–2
Šibenik	8–1	Graničar Županja	6–1	2–0
Nehaj Senj	2–8	Rijeka	1–5	1–3
Raštane	1–10	Osijek	1–7	0–3
NK Đakovo	2–8	Dubrovnik	2–3	0–5
Napredak Velika Mlaka	0–14	NK Zagreb	0–5	0–9
Segesta	9–0	Karlovac	2–0	7–0

== Second round ==
Team 1	Agg.	Team 2	1st leg	2nd leg
Belišće	3–8	Croatia Zagreb	2–2	1–6
Marsonia	1–1 (4–2 p)	Hajduk Split	1–0	0–1
Neretva	3–4	Inker Zaprešić	1–1	2–3
Slaven Belupo	1–2	Rijeka	1–1	0–1
Cibalia	1–4	Osijek	1–0	0–4
Šibenik	1–5	Varteks	1–1	0–4
Segesta	3–4	NK Zagreb	2–0	1–4
Dubrovnik	1–4	Zadar	1–2	0–2

== Quarter-finals ==
Team 1	Agg.	Team 2	1st leg	2nd leg
Marsonia	0–10	Croatia Zagreb	0–5	0–5
Zadar	1–0	Inker Zaprešić	1–0	0–0
NK Zagreb	7–0	Rijeka	5–0	2–0
Varteks	4–1	Osijek	4–1	0–0

== Semi-finals ==
3 April 1996
16:30

Zadar	1–3	Croatia Zagreb
Bogdan 66'	Report	Viduka 31'; Slišković 62'; Marić 77'

Stadion Stanovi, Zadar
Attendance: 7,000
Referee: Anđelko Brkić (Vinkovci)
17 April 1996
16:30

Croatia Zagreb	2–1	Zadar
Cvitanović 14' (pen.), 72'	Report	Vujčić 81'

Stadion Maksimir, Zagreb
Attendance: 500
Referee: Ante Kulušić (Šibenik)

Croatia Zagreb won 5–2 on aggregate.

3 April 1996
16:30

NK Zagreb	1–2	Varteks
Dalić 13' (o.g.)	Report	Besek 23'; Vugrinec 85'

Stadion Kranjčevićeva, Zagreb
Attendance: 1,000
Referee: Ante Kulušić (Šibenik)
17 April 1996
16:30

Varteks	3–0	NK Zagreb
Vugrinec 57' (pen.); Dalić 65'; Duraković 84'	Report

Stadion Varteks, Varaždin
Attendance: 4,000
Referee: Miro Marijanović (Osijek)

Varteks won 5–1 on aggregate.

== Final ==
=== First leg ===
1 May 1996
17:00

Varteks	0–2	Croatia Zagreb
	Report	Viduka 8'; Cvitanović 12'

Stadion Varteks, Varaždin
Attendance: 11,000
Referee: Ante Kulušić (Šibenik)

=== Second leg ===
16 May 1996
20:15

Croatia Zagreb	1–0	Varteks
Cvitanović 60' (pen.)	Report

Stadion Maksimir, Zagreb
Attendance: 20,000
Referee: Ante Kulušić (Šibenik)

Croatia Zagreb won 3–0 on aggregate.

== See also ==
- 1995–96 Croatian First Football League
