= Niko Čeko =

Croatian footballer

Personal information
- Full name: Niko Čeko
- Date of birth: 13 February 1969 (age 57)
- Place of birth: Livno, SFR Yugoslavia
- Position: Midfielder

Youth career
- 1976–1984: Troglav Livno
- 1984–1987: Hajduk Split

Senior career*
Years	Team	Apps	(Gls)
1982–1984	Troglav Livno		
1987–1989	Maribor	59	(5)
1989–1995	NK Zagreb	141	(10)
1995–1998	Hajduk Split	27	(6)
1998	Šibenik	8	(1)
1999	Hajduk Split	1	(0)

International career
1992	Croatia	2	(0)
- * Club domestic league appearances and goals as of 30 December 2008

Niko Čeko (born 13 February 1969 in Livno) is a retired Croatian footballer who last played for Hajduk Split.

== International career ==
He made his debut for Croatia in a July 1992 friendly match against Australia, coming on as a 70th-minute substitute for Dražen Biškup, and earned a total of 2 caps, scoring no goals. His second and final international came four days later against the same opposition.

== External sources ==
- Niko Čeko at National-Football-Teams.com
- Niko Čeko at Croatian Football Statistics (archived) (in Croatian)
