= Stadion Krimeja =

Football stadium in Rijeka, Croatia

Krimeja
- Nogometno igralište Orijent
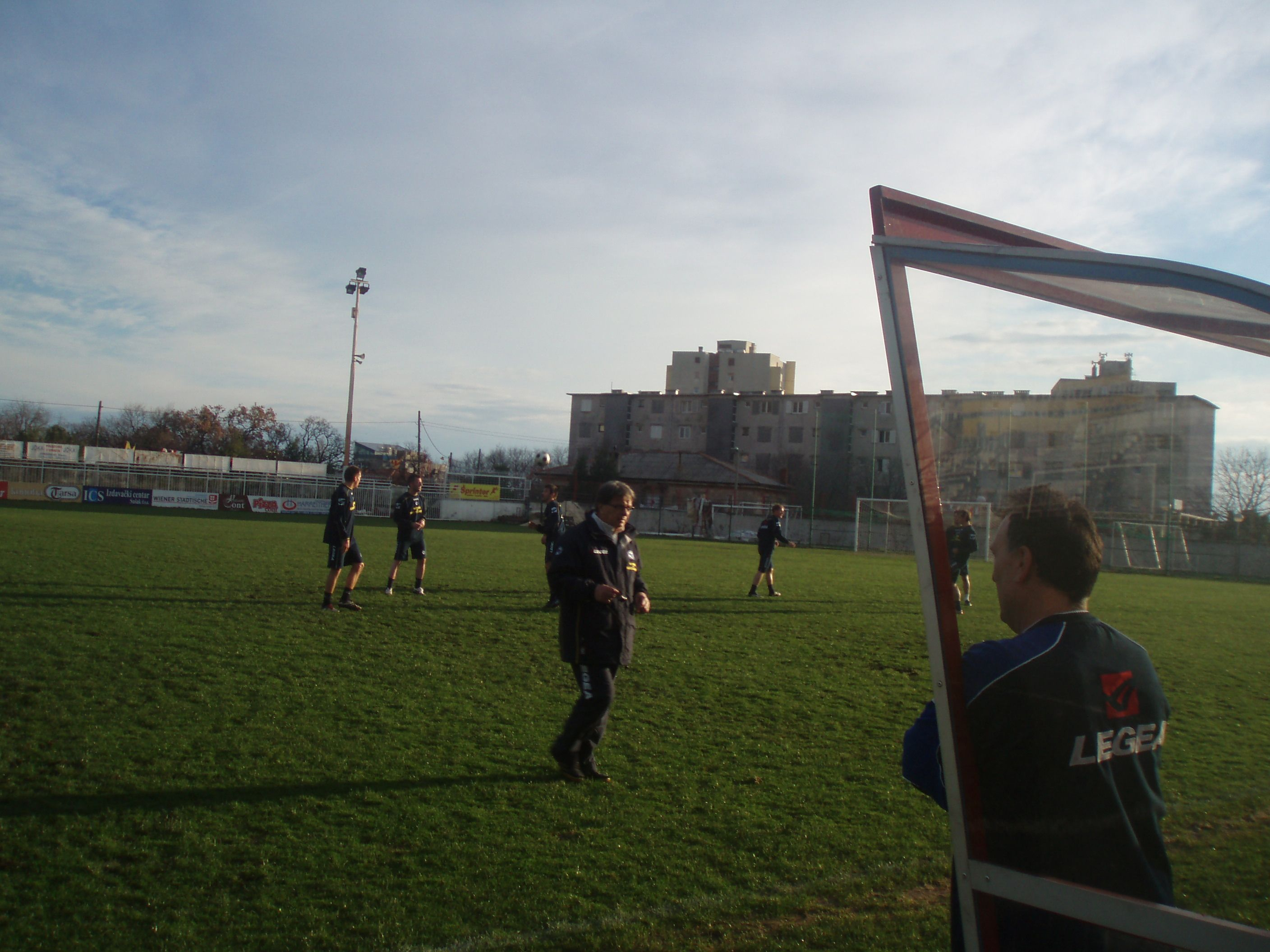
- Interactive map of Krimeja
- Full name: Stadion Krimeja
- Location: Rijeka, Croatia
- Coordinates: 45.3236959°N 14.4684263°E
- Owner: City of Rijeka
- Operator: HNK Orijent 1919
- Capacity: 3,000 (1,200 seated)
- Surface: Grass
- Record attendance: 6,000 (Orijent v. Rijeka) (25 August 1996)

Construction
- Opened: 20 May 1923
- Expanded: 1936

Tenant
- NK Orijent (1923–present)

Stadion Krimeja is a football stadium in the Croatian city of Rijeka. It is named after the Krimeja neighbourhood where it is located. The stadium has served as the home ground for HNK Orijent since 1923. The capacity of the stadium is 3,000 spectators.
