= Vik Lalić =

Croatian footballer

Personal information
- Full name: Vik Lalić
- Date of birth: 9 February 1976 (age 50)
- Place of birth: Makarska, SR Croatia, SFR Yugoslavia
- Height: 1.85 m (6 ft 1 in)
- Position: Defender

Team information
- Current team: Croatia Zmijavci (manager)

Youth career
- –1993: Hajduk Split

Senior career*
| Years | Team | Apps | (Gls) |
| 1993–2001 | Hajduk Split | 97 | (5) |
| 1994 | → Zadar (loan) | 1 | (0) |
| 2001 | Rot-Weiß Oberhausen | 1 | (0) |
| 2002–2003 | Hajduk Split | 6 | (0) |
| 2003–2005 | Solin Građa | 13 | (0) |
| 2006 | Neuchâtel Xamax | 11 | (0) |
| 2006 | Solin Građa | 2 | (0) |
| 2007 | Dugopolje | 0 | (0) |
| 2007–2009 | Mosor | 34 | (0) |

Managerial career
- 2017: Hajduk Split (assistant)
- 2020–: Croatia Zmijavci
- * Club domestic league appearances and goals as of 3 August 2011

Vik Lalić (born 9 February 1976) is a retired Croatian football player who played as a defender. He is currently a coach of NK Croatia Zmijavci.

== Club career ==
He started his career at Hajduk Split in 1996 before moving to Rot-Weiß Oberhausen in Germany in 2001. The following season he returned to Hajduk, transferring to NK Solin in 2005 before finally moving to Neuchâtel Xamax in 2006. He was champion of the Croatian First League with Hajduk in 2001, 2004 and 2005.
