= Damir Vuica =

Croatian footballer

Personal information
- Date of birth: 17 January 1972 (age 54)
- Place of birth: Osijek, Croatia
- Height: 1.85 m (6 ft 1 in)
- Position: Defender

Youth career
- Osijek
- Metalac

Senior career*
Years	Team	Apps	(Gls)
1992–1994	Osijek	60	(2)
1994–1997	Hajduk Split	45	(2)
1997–2002	Osijek	141	(9)
2002–2005	Kamen Ingrad	76	(3)
2005–2009	Osijek	50	(1)
Total		372	(17)
- * Club domestic league appearances and goals

Damir Vuica (born 17 January 1972) is a Croatian retired footballer who played for NK Osijek, HNK Hajduk Split and NK Kamen Ingrad. He is considered one of the best Osijek´s players of all time.

== Career ==
The long-haired Vuica played 295 official matches for Osijek in all competitions, putting him in third place with most appearances for the club after Mile Škorić and Bakir Beširević.

Vuica has the honour to be the most yellow-carded player in the history of the Croatian Football League with 104 in 372 games. He is also Osijek's record holder with 67.

He played in the Champions League for Hajduk, losing in the quarter-finals to eventual champions Ajax, and in Kamen Ingrad's only ever UEFA Cup run.

== Personal life ==
Vuica is married to Jakica and the couple has two sons.

== Career statistics ==
Performances in Prva HNL
Season	Apps	Goals
NK Osijek
1992	5	1
1992–93	23	0
1993–94	32	1
HNK Hajduk Split
1994–95	14	0
1995–96	24	0
1996–97	7	0
NK Osijek
1996–97	11	3
1997–98	26	1
1998–99	25	3
1999–00	25	1
2000–01	28	1
2001–02	26	0
NK Kamen Ingrad
2002–03	20	1
2003–04	29	1
2004–05	27	1
NK Osijek
2005–06	20	1
2006–07	21	0
2007–08	8	0
2008–09	1	0
Total	372	17
