= Mario Meštrović =

Croatian footballer

Personal information
- Full name: Mario Meštrović
- Date of birth: 22 May 1970 (age 56)
- Place of birth: Osijek, Croatia
- Height: 1.77 m (5 ft 10 in)
- Position: Attacking midfielder

Senior career*
Years	Team	Apps	(Gls)
1990–1994	Cibalia	107	(7)
1994–1996	Hajduk Split	98	(8)
1996–1997	Deportivo Alavés	26	(4)
1997–1998	Hapoel Tel Aviv	21	(6)
1998–1999	Hapoel Kfar Saba	25	(2)
1999–2000	Hapoel Jerusalem	13	(6)
2000–2001	Cibalia	40	(9)
2001–2003	Rijeka	37	(5)
Total		294	(27)
- * Club domestic league appearances and goals

Mario Meštrović (born 22 May 1970 in Osijek) is a retired Croatian footballer who last played for HNK Rijeka.
