= Dragan Vukoja =

Croatian footballer (born 1969)

Personal information
- Date of birth: 11 March 1969 (age 57)
- Place of birth: Kućani, SR BIH, SFR Yugoslavia
- Height: 1.87 m (6 ft 2 in)
- Position: Forward

Team information
- Current team: Dugopolje (manager)

Senior career*
| Years | Team | Apps | (Gls) |
| 1992 | Osijek | 9 | (0) |
| 1992 | Belišće | 11 | (6) |
| 1993 | Osijek | 7 | (0) |
| 1993 | Belišće | 1 | (0) |
| 1993–1996 | Osijek | 64 | (25) |
| 1996–1997 | Hrvatski Dragovoljac | 29 | (19) |
| 1997–1998 | Foggia | 35 | (9) |
| 1998 | Salernitana | 1 | (0) |
| 1998–1999 | Genoa | 24 | (7) |
| 1999–2001 | Pescara | 33 | (7) |
| 2001 | Sichuan | 25 | (13) |
| 2002–2003 | Qingdao | | (12) |
| 2004 | Osijek | 12 | (4) |

Managerial career
- 2022-: Dugopolje
- * Club domestic league appearances and goals

Dragan Vukoja (born 11 March 1969) is a Croatian football manager and former player who manages Dugopolje.

== Career ==
Vukoja spent most of his career playing in Croatia and Italy. In Croatia he played with Osijek, Belišće and Hrvatski Dragovoljac. In Italy he played for Foggia, Salernitana, Genoa and Pescara. Vukoja also spent three seasons in China where he played with Sichuan and Qingdao. He retired in 2004.

He later worked as sporting director at Osijek.
