= Renato Jurčec =

Croatian footballer

Personal information
- Date of birth: 4 June 1966 (age 60)
- Place of birth: Zaprešić, SFR Yugoslavia
- Height: 1.78 m (5 ft 10 in)
- Position: Forward

Senior career*
| Years | Team | Apps | (Gls) |
| 1990–1992 | NK Zagreb | 60 | (16) |
| 1993–1994 | Inker Zaprešić | 27 | (11) |
| 1994–1996 | Hajduk Split | 46 | (20) |
| 1995 | → Inker Zaprešić (loan) | 15 | (12) |
| 1996–1998 | Croatia Zagreb | 19 | (8) |
| 1997 | → NK Zagreb (loan) | 9 | (4) |
| 1998–1999 | Cibalia | 23 | (5) |
| 1999–2002 | Slaven Belupo | 74 | (16) |
| 2002–2003 | Inker Zaprešić | | |
| 2005–2007 | Maksimir | 57 | (29) |
| Total | | 330 | (121) |

Managerial career
- 2007–2008: NK Laduč
- 2011–2012: Bistra
- 2012: NK Lekenik
- 2017: Kustošija
- * Club domestic league appearances and goals

Renato Jurčec (born 4 June 1966) is a retired Croatian football player who played as a forward. Jurčec spent his entire career playing for a number of Croatian clubs, including spells at both of the country's powerhouses, Dinamo Zagreb (which was called Croatia Zagreb in the 1990s) and Hajduk Split. He holds the distinction of scoring at least one goal in each of the first 11 Croatian league championships since its inception in 1992 until the 2001–02 season, his last in top level.

== Club career ==
Jurčec began his career at NK Zagreb in the late 1980s at the time when they were playing in the Yugoslav Second League. In the 1990–91 season, the last season in which Croatian clubs participated in the Yugoslav football league system, Jurčec scored 7 goals in 30 league appearances for the club. Following the breakup of Yugoslavia and the formation of Prva HNL, Jurčec was a regular member of the NK Zagreb team which finished as runners-up in the shortened 1992 season, scoring 8 goals in 22 appearances.

He later had a spell with his hometown club NK Inter Zaprešić (at the time called Inker), before moving to Hajduk Split in 1994 with whom he spent a season and a half. In 1996, he was transferred to their archrivals Dinamo Zagreb, but failed to make an impact and was loaned back to NK Zagreb for the latter part of the 1996–97 season. In 1998, he moved on to Cibalia with whom he spent the last three top-flight seasons of his career, scoring 16 goals in 74 appearances for the club.

In 2002–03 he moved back to Inter Zaprešić for a season and played for them in the Druga HNL, Croatia's second level, before retiring from active football at the age of 37. However, he briefly came back from retirement in 2005 and signed for fourth level minnows NK Maksimir for whom he appeared in 57 matches and scored 29 goals over the next two seasons.
