= Darko Butorović =

Croatian footballer

Personal information
- Date of birth: 12 August 1970 (age 56)
- Place of birth: Split, SFR Yugoslavia
- Height: 1.73 m (5 ft 8 in)
- Position: Rightback

Youth career
- 1982–1992: RNK Split

Senior career*
Years	Team	Apps	(Gls)
1992–1996	Hajduk Split	93	(6)
1997–1998	FC Porto	9	(0)
1998–1999	Vitesse	5	(0)
1999–2000	SC Farense	1	(0)
2000–2003	Hajduk Split	19	(1)
Total		123	(7)

International career
1995–1997	Croatia	3	(0)
- * Club domestic league appearances and goals

Darko Butorović (born 12 August 1970 in Split) is a Croatian former footballer who played for Hajduk Split and other foreign clubs.

== International career ==
He made his debut for Croatia in a June 1995 European Championship qualification match away against Ukraine, coming on as a first half substitute for Zvonimir Boban, and earned a total of 3 caps, scoring no goals. His final international was a June 1997 Kirin Cup match against Turkey.
