= Mass Sarr Jr. =

Liberian retired footballer (born 1973)

Personal information
- Full name: Mass Sarr Jr.
- Date of birth: February 6, 1973 (age 53)
- Place of birth: Monrovia, Liberia
- Height: 1.76 m (5 ft 9 in)
- Position: Forward

Senior career*
Years	Team	Apps	(Gls)
1988–1990	Mighty Barolle		
1990–1991	AS Monaco		
1991–1992	Stade Athletique Epinal	10	(1)
1992–1995	Olympique Ales	84	(23)
1995–1998	Hajduk Split	59	(17)
1998–2000	Reading FC	31	(3)
2000–2001	Sydney Olympic	10	(0)
2001–2004	Selangor FA		

International career
1989–2002	Liberia	79	(4)
- * Club domestic league appearances and goals as of 13:42, 9 December 2007 (UTC)

Mass Sarr Jr. (born February 6, 1973) is a Liberian retired footballer. A forward, Sarr Jr. is a former player with Selangor FA. He was also a Liberia national football team player from 1989 to 2002.

== Playing career ==
Sarr spent 18 months at Reading, playing 38 times in all competitions, including 31 league matches.

Sarr played ten times for Sydney Olympic in the Australian National Soccer League during the 2000–01 season.

== Post-playing career ==
Upon moving to Philadelphia, Pennsylvania, he became a leading trainer for several youth athletics clubs in the tri-state area, but he worked primarily in South Jersey with the Cohansey Soccer Club in Cumberland County, New Jersey. He coached the U17 and U18 youth club team, Cohansey Hornets SC.
