= NK Marsonia =

Croatian football club

Marsonia
- Full name: Nogometni klub Marsonia 1909 Slavonski Brod
- Nicknames: Marsa; Crno-Bijeli (The Black and Whites)
- Founded: 1909; 117 years ago
- Ground: Gradski Stadion uz Savu
- Capacity: 6,000
- League: 3. NL – East
- 2025–26: 3. NL – East, 2nd of 16
Home colours	Away colours

Nogometni klub Marsonia or simply NK Marsonia is a Croatian football club based in the city of Slavonski Brod. They currently play in the 3. NL – East, the fourth tier of Croatian football.

The club was founded in 1909. From 1945 to 1962, it was called NK Radnički Brod, and then BSK from 1962 to 1992 before the club's original name was restored. They last played in the top flight 1. HNL in 2004, finishing last and suffering relegation. In 2011, NK Marsonia merged with MV Croatia to form NK Marsonia 1909.

Some of Marsonia's notable former players include Mario Mandžukić, Ivica Olić, Veldin Karić, Boris Živković and Josip Weber.

== Honours ==
Druga HNL – North:

- Winners (2): 1993–94, 2002–03

Treća HNL – East:

- Winners (2): 1998–99, 2019–20

== Recent seasons ==
Season	League									Cup
Season	Division	P	W	D	L	F	A	Pts	Pos	Cup
1992										
1992–93	2. HNL North	30	15	8	7	62	34	38	2nd	R2
1993–94	2. HNL North	30	19	7	4	57	16	45	1st ↑	R1
1994–95	1. HNL	30	13	8	9	42	32	47	5th	
1995–96	1. A HNL	36	9	6	21	26	59	36	14th	QF
1996–97	1. A HNL	30	11	5	14	38	50	38	12th ↓	
1997–98	2. HNL East	30	13	7	10	38	37	46	6th	R1
1998–99	3. HNL East	32	23	6	3	63	17	75	1st ↑	R1
1999–2000	2. HNL	32	19	7	6	52	18	64	1st ↑	R2
2000–01	1. HNL	32	7	8	17	41	68	29	12th	R1
2001–02	1. HNL	30	8	6	16	37	46	30	15th ↓	R1
2002–03	2. HNL North	32	19	9	4	65	28	66	1st ↑	PR
2003–04	1. HNL	32	5	10	17	32	64	25	12th ↓	
2004–05	2. HNL North	32	16	8	8	50	36	56	2nd	
2005–06	2. HNL North	32	16	6	10	51	41	54	7th	
2006–07	2. HNL	30	9	7	14	38	50	34	12th	
2007–08	2. HNL	30	8	7	15	34	58	31	13th ↓	
2008–09	3. HNL East	17	1	2	14	12	54	5	18th ↓	
2009–10	Brod-Posavina County	33	14	5	14	62	48	46	8th	
2010–11	Brod-Posavina County	31	14	3	14	50	60	44	11th	
