= 1994–95 HNK Hajduk Split season =

Hajduk Split
1994–95 season
- Chairman: Nadan Vidošević
- Manager: Ivan Katalinić
- Prva HNL: 1st
- Croatian Cup: Winners
- Champions League: Quarter-finals
- Croatian Supercup: Winners
- Top goalscorer: League: Tomislav Erceg (17); All: Tomislav Erceg (25)
- Highest home attendance: 35,000 vs Anderlecht (19 October 1994)
- Lowest home attendance: 300 vs Varteks (10 May 1995)
- Average home league attendance: 7,167

The 1994–95 season was the 84th season in Hajduk Split’s history and their fourth in the Prva HNL. Their 1st place finish in the 1993–94 season meant it was their 4th successive season playing in the Prva HNL.

== Competitions ==
=== Overall record ===
Performance by competition
Competition	Starting round	Final position/round	First match	Last match
Prva HNL	—N/a	Winners	14 August 1994	4 June 1995
Croatian Football Cup	First round	Winners	4 September 1994	28 May 1995
Super Cup	—N/a	Winners	24 July 1994	31 July 1994
UEFA Champions League	Qualifying round	Quarter-final	10 August 1994	15 March 1995

Statistics by competition
Competition	Pld	W	D	L	GF	GA	GD	Win%
Prva HNL	30	19	8	3	68	26	+42	63.33
Croatian Football Cup	10	7	3	0	28	9	+19	70.00
Super Cup	2	1	0	1	1	1	+0	50.00
UEFA Champions League	10	4	3	3	10	10	+0	40.00
Total	51	30	14	7	107	46	+61	58.82

=== Prva HNL ===
==== Classification ====
Pos	Team	Pld	W	D	L	GF	GA	GD	Pts	Qualification or relegation
1	Hajduk Split (C)	30	19	8	3	68	26	+42	65	Qualification to Champions League qualifying round
2	Croatia Zagreb	30	19	7	4	53	26	+27	64	Banned from European competitions (Note: Croatia Zagreb were banned from European competitions for 1 year after their fans rioted and injured several policemen during the 1994–95 Cup Winners' Cup game against Auxerre)
3	Osijek	30	16	11	3	65	30	+35	59	Qualification to UEFA Cup preliminary round
4	NK Zagreb	30	14	11	5	41	26	+15	53	Qualification to Intertoto Cup group stage
5	Marsonia	30	13	8	9	42	32	+10	47	

Source: RSSSF.org
Rules for classification: 1st points; 2nd head-to-head points.
(C) Champions

==== Results summary ====
Overall								Home						Away					
Pld	W	D	L	GF	GA	GD	Pts	W	D	L	GF	GA	GD	W	D	L	GF	GA	GD
30	19	8	3	68	26	+42	65	13	2	0	48	14	+34	6	6	3	20	12	+8

Last updated: 4 June 1995.
Source: Sportnet.hr

==== Results by round ====
Round	1	2	3	4	5	6	7	8	9	10	11	12	13	14	15	16	17	18	19	20	21	22	23	24	25	26	27	28	29	30
Ground	H	H	A	H	A	H	A	H	A	H	A	H	A	H	A	A	A	H	A	H	A	H	A	H	A	H	A	H	A	H
Result	D	W	D	W	D	W	D	W	W	W	D	W	L	W	L	L	D	W	W	D	W	W	D	W	W	W	W	W	W	W
Position	10	4	7	3	3	2	3	3	2	1	1	1	2	1	2	3	3	3	3	4	4	3	3	3	3	2	2	1	1	1

Source: Competitive matches
A = Away; H = Home; W = Win; D = Draw; L = Loss

==== Results by opponent ====
Team	Results		Points
Team	1	2	Points
Belišće	4–0	1–1	4
Cibalia	1–1	4–1	4
Croatia Zagreb	0–1	3–1	3
Inker Zaprešić	3–1	2–0	6
Istra	4–2	3–0	6
Marsonia	0–0	0–1	1
Neretva	7–1	4–1	6
Osijek	1–2	3–0	3
Primorac	1–0	2–0	6
Rijeka	5–2	1–0	6
Segesta	2–0	2–1	6
Šibenik	2–2	3–1	4
Varteks	0–0	3–1	4
Zadar	3–2	1–1	4
NK Zagreb	1–1	2–2	2

Source: 1994–95 Croatian First Football League article

=== UEFA Champions League ===
==== Group C ====
Pos	Team	Pld	W	D	L	GF	GA	GD	Pts	Qualification	BEN	HAJ	STE	AND
1	(Portugal) Benfica	6	3	3	0	9	5	+4	9	Advance to knockout stage	—	2–1	2–1	3–1
2	(Croatia) Hajduk Split	6	2	2	2	5	7	−2	6	Advance to knockout stage	0–0	—	1–4	2–1
3	(Romania) Steaua București	6	1	3	2	7	6	+1	5		1–1	0–1	—	1–1
4	(Belgium) Anderlecht	6	0	4	2	4	7	−3	4		1–1	0–0	0–0	—

Source: UEFA

== Matches ==
=== Croatian Football Super Cup ===
Match	Date	Venue	Opponent	Score	Attendance	Hajduk Scorers	Report
1	24 Jul	H	Croatia Zagreb	1 – 0	30,000	Mornar	HRnogomet.com
2	31 Jul	A	Croatia Zagreb	0 – 1 (4 – 3 p)	15,000		HRnogomet.com

Source: hajduk.hr

=== Prva HNL ===
Round	Date	Venue	Opponent	Score	Attendance	Hajduk Scorers	Report
1	14 Aug	H	Marsonia	0 – 0	4,000		HRnogomet.com
2	20 Aug	H	Zadar	3 – 2	4,000	Vukas, Pralija, Z. Vulić	HRnogomet.com
3	28 Aug	A	Šibenik	2 – 2	12,000	Asanović, Rapaić	HRnogomet.com
4	10 Sep	H	Rijeka	5 – 2	3,500	Vukas (2), Erceg (2), Računica	HRnogomet.com
5	18 Sep	A	NK Zagreb	1 – 1	8,000	Mornar	HRnogomet.com
6	23 Sep	H	Istra	4 – 2	2,000	Butorović, Asanović, Erceg, Pralija	HRnogomet.com
7	2 Oct	A	Cibalia	1 – 1	10,000	Pralija	HRnogomet.com
8	14 Oct	H	Belišće	4 – 0	4,000	Erceg (4)	HRnogomet.com
9	23 Oct	A	Primorac	1 – 0	4,000	Hibić	HRnogomet.com
10	29 Oct	H	Inker Zaprešić	3 – 1	2,000	Erceg, Štimac, Andrijašević	HRnogomet.com
11	6 Nov	A	Varteks	0 – 0	13,000		HRnogomet.com
12	19 Nov	H	Segesta	2 – 0	2,500	Hibić, Vučević	HRnogomet.com
13	27 Nov	A	Croatia Zagreb	0 – 1	20,000		HRnogomet.com
14	3 Dec	H	Neretva	7 – 1	2,000	Vučević (2), Erceg, Vukas, Andrijašević, Pralija, Butorović	HRnogomet.com
15	11 Dec	A	Osijek	1 – 2	15,000	Erceg	Slobodna Dalmacija
16	18 Feb	A	Marsonia	0 – 1	10,000		HRnogomet.com
17	5 Mar	A	Zadar	1 – 1	10,000	Asanović	Slobodna Dalmacija
18	10 Mar	H	Šibenik	3 – 1	2,500	Andrijašević (2), Erceg	HRnogomet.com
19	19 Mar	A	Rijeka	1 – 0	6,000	Jurčec	HRnogomet.com
20	2 Apr	H	NK Zagreb	2 – 2	10,000	Jurčec, Asanović	HRnogomet.com
21	9 Apr	A	Istra	3 – 0	7,000	Erceg (2), Štimac	HRnogomet.com
22	12 Apr	H	Cibalia	4 – 1	4,000	Pralija, Asanović, Jurčec, Erceg	HRnogomet.com
23	16 Apr	A	Belišće	1 – 1	3,000	Erceg	HRnogomet.com
24	30 Apr	H	Primorac	2 – 0	3,000	Z. Vulić, Erceg	HRnogomet.com
25	6 May	A	Inker Zaprešić	2 – 0	5,000	Hibić, Pralija	HRnogomet.com
26	14 May	H	Varteks	3 – 1	4,000	Erceg, Pralija, Jurčec	HRnogomet.com
27	21 May	A	Segesta	2 – 1	2,000	Jurčec, Mornar	HRnogomet.com
28	24 May	H	Croatia Zagreb	3 – 1	30,000	Pralija (2), Mornar	HRnogomet.com
29	31 May	A	Neretva	4 – 1	5,000	Pralija (2), Rapaić, Lalić	HRnogomet.com
30	4 Jun	H	Osijek	3 – 0	30,000	Jurčec (2), Butorović	HRnogomet.com

Source: hajduk.hr

=== Croatian Football Cup ===
Round	Date	Venue	Opponent	Score	Attendance	Hajduk Scorers	Report
R1	4 Sep	A	Gospić	5 – 1	5,000	Erceg (2), Vladislavić (2), Filipović	Slobodna Dalmacija
R1	11 Oct	H	Gospić	5 – 0	2,000	Andrijašević (2), Balajić (2), Filipović	Slobodna Dalmacija
R2	8 Nov	A	Špansko	1 – 1	2,000	Erceg	Slobodna Dalmacija
R2	29 Nov	H	Špansko	4 – 3	500	Andrijašević (2), Vukas, Računica	Slobodna Dalmacija
QF	26 Mar	A	Segesta	1 – 1	5,000	Jurčec	HRnogomet.com
QF	5 Apr	H	Segesta	3 – 0	2,500	Jozinović, Butorović, Erceg	HRnogomet.com
SF	19 Apr	A	Varteks	1 – 1	9,000	Jozinović	HRnogomet.com
SF	10 May	H	Varteks	4 – 0	300	Pralija (2), Erceg, Asanović	HRnogomet.com
Final	17 May	H	Croatia Zagreb	3 – 2	15,000	Erceg (2), Asanović	HRnogomet.com
Final	28 May	A	Croatia Zagreb	1 – 0	17,000	Asanović	HRnogomet.com

Source: hajduk.hr

=== Champions League ===
Round	Date	Venue	Opponent	Score	Attendance	Hajduk Scorers	Report
QR	10 Aug	A (Poland)	Legia Warsaw (Poland)	1 – 0	7,249	Rapaić	UEFA.com
QR	24 Aug	H	Legia Warsaw (Poland)	4 – 0	30,000	Asanović (2), Rapaić, Erceg	UEFA.com
GS	14 Sep	H	Benfica (Portugal)	0 – 0	28,000		UEFA.com
GS	28 Sep	A (Romania)	Steaua București (Romania)	1 – 0	20,000	Asanović	UEFA.com
GS	19 Oct	H	Anderlecht (Belgium)	2 – 1	35,000	Pralija, Butorović	UEFA.com
GS	2 Nov	A (Belgium)	Anderlecht (Belgium)	0 – 0	20,399		UEFA.com
GS	23 Nov	A (Portugal)	Benfica (Portugal)	1 – 2	45,000	Andrijašević	UEFA.com
GS	7 Dec	H	Steaua București (Romania)	1 – 4	15,000	Andrijašević	UEFA.com
QF	1 Mar	H	Ajax (Netherlands)	0 – 0	34,250		UEFA.com
QF	15 Mar	A (Netherlands)	Ajax (Netherlands)	0 – 3	42,000		UEFA.com

Source: hajduk.hr

== Player seasonal records ==
=== Top scorers ===
Rank	Name	League	Europe	Cup	Supercup	Total
1	(Croatia) Tomislav Erceg	17	1	7	–	25
2	(Croatia) Nenad Pralija	11	1	2	–	14
3	(Croatia) Aljoša Asanović	5	3	3	–	11
4	(Croatia) Stjepan Andrijašević	4	2	4	–	10
5	(Croatia) Renato Jurčec	7	–	1	–	8
6	(Croatia) Hari Vukas	4	–	1	–	5
6	(Croatia) Darko Butorović	3	1	1	–	5
8	(Croatia) Ivica Mornar	3	–	–	1	4
8	(Croatia) Milan Rapaić	2	2	–	–	4
10	(Bosnia and Herzegovina) Mirsad Hibić	3	–	–	–	3
10	(Croatia) Goran Vučević	3	–	–	–	3
12	(Croatia) Stipe Balajić	–	–	2	–	2
12	(Croatia) Dalibor Filipović	–	–	2	–	2
12	(Croatia) Darko Jozinović	–	–	2	–	2
12	(Croatia) Dean Računica	1	–	1	–	2
12	(Croatia) Igor Štimac	2	–	–	–	2
12	(Croatia) Robert Vladislavić	–	–	2	–	2
12	(Croatia) Zoran Vulić	2	–	–	–	2
19	(Croatia) Vik Lalić	1	–	–	–	1
	TOTALS	68	10	28	1	107

Source: Competitive matches

== See also ==
- 1994–95 Croatian First Football League
- 1994–95 Croatian Football Cup

== External sources ==
- 1994–95 Prva HNL at HRnogomet.com
- 1994–95 Croatian Cup at HRnogomet.com
- 1994–95 UEFA Champions League at rsssf.com
