= 1993–94 HNK Hajduk Split season =

Hajduk Split
1993–94 season
- Chairman: Nadan Vidošević
- Manager: Ivan Katalinić
- Prva HNL: 1st
- Croatian Cup: Semi-finals
- Cup Winners' Cup: First round
- Croatian Supercup: Winners
- Top goalscorer: League: Tomislav Erceg (18); All: Tomislav Erceg (24)
- Highest home attendance: 30,000 vs Croatia Zagreb (21 September 1993)
- Lowest home attendance: 300 vs Primorac (BnM) (17 August 1993)
- Average home league attendance: 6,529

The 1993–94 season was the 83rd season in Hajduk Split’s history and their third in the Prva HNL. Their 2nd place finish in the 1992–93 season meant it was their 3rd successive season playing in the Prva HNL.

== Competitions ==
=== Overall record ===
Performance by competition
Competition	Starting round	Final position/round	First match	Last match
Prva HNL	—	Winners	21 August 1993	12 June 1994
Croatian Football Cup	First round	Semi-final	17 August 1993	27 April 1994
Super Cup	—	Winners	1 August 1993	7 August 1993
Cup Winners' Cup	First round		17 September 1993	29 September 1993

Statistics by competition
Competition	Pld	W	D	L	GF	GA	GD	Win%
Prva HNL	34	22	6	6	84	36	+48	64.71
Croatian Football Cup	8	5	3	0	21	3	+18	62.50
Super Cup	2	0	2	0	4	4	+0	0.00
Cup Winners' Cup	2	1	0	1	1	6	−5	50.00
Total	46	28	11	7	110	49	+61	60.87

=== Prva HNL ===
==== Classification ====
Pos	Team	Pld	W	D	L	GF	GA	GD	Pts	Qualification or relegation
1	Hajduk Split (C)	34	22	6	6	84	36	+48	50	Qualification to Champions League qualifying round
2	NK Zagreb	34	20	9	5	58	30	+28	49	
3	Croatia Zagreb	34	20	8	6	98	34	+64	48	Qualification to Cup Winners' Cup first round
4	Inker Zaprešić	34	17	8	9	48	34	+14	42	
5	Varteks	34	16	9	9	51	31	+20	41	

Source: RSSSF.org
Rules for classification: 1st points; 2nd head-to-head points.
(C) Champions

==== Results summary ====
Overall								Home						Away					
Pld	W	D	L	GF	GA	GD	Pts	W	D	L	GF	GA	GD	W	D	L	GF	GA	GD
34	22	6	6	84	36	+48	72	15	1	1	61	14	+47	7	5	5	23	22	+1

Last updated: 12 June 1994.
Source: Sportnet.hr

==== Results by round ====
Round	1	2	3	4	5	6	7	8	9	10	11	12	13	14	15	16	17	18	19	20	21	22	23	24	25	26	27	28	29	30	31	32	33	34
Ground	H	A	H	A	H	A	H	A	H	H	A	H	A	H	A	H	A	A	H	A	H	A	H	A	H	A	A	H	A	H	A	H	A	H
Result	W	D	W	W	W	D	D	L	W	W	W	W	L	W	W	L	W	W	W	W	W	L	W	D	W	D	D	W	L	W	W	W	L	W
Position	2	4	3	1	1	1	2	3	2	2	2	2	2	1	1	2	2	1	1	1	1	1	1	1	1	1	1	1	1	1	1	1	1	1

Updated to match(es) played on 12 June 1994. Source: Competitive matches
A = Away; H = Home; W = Win; D = Draw; L = Loss

==== Results by opponent ====
Team	Results		Points
Team	1	2	Points
Belišće	0–2	4–2	3
Cibalia	3–2	0–1	3
Croatia Zagreb	3–2	0–4	3
Dubrava	4–3	3–0	6
Dubrovnik	1–1	6–0	4
Inker Zaprešić	1–1	2–1	4
Istra	1–0	4–1	6
Neretva	7–1	4–1	6
Osijek	4–1	3–1	6
Pazinka	5–1	2–1	6
Primorac	4–1	2–0	6
Radnik	3–1	10–0	6
Rijeka	0–2	1–2	0
Segesta	1–1	1–1	2
Šibenik	2–0	0–0	4
Varteks	1–3	2–0	3
Zadar	3–0	1–1	4
NK Zagreb	4–0	1–0	6

Source: 1993–94 Croatian First Football League article

== Matches ==
=== Croatian Football Super Cup ===
Match	Date	Venue	Opponent	Score	Attendance	Hajduk Scorers	Report
1	1 Aug	A	Croatia Zagreb	4 – 4	30,000	Računica, Mornar (2), Pralija	HRnogomet.com
2	7 Aug	H	Croatia Zagreb	0 – 0	30,000		HRnogomet.com

Source: hajduk.hr

=== Prva HNL ===
Round	Date	Venue	Opponent	Score	Attendance	Hajduk Scorers	Report
1	21 Aug	H	Primorac	4 – 1	1,500	Mornar, Miše, Računica, Rapaić	Slobodna Dalmacija
2	28 Aug	A	Dubrovnik	1 – 1	3,500	Balajić	HRnogomet.com
3	4 Sep	H	Pazinka	5 – 1	2,000	Računica, Andrijašević, Erceg (3)	HRnogomet.com
4	11 Sep	A	Osijek	4 – 1	8,000	Erceg, Kozniku, Računica (2)	HRnogomet.com
5	21 Sep	H	Croatia Zagreb	4 – 2	30,000	Hibić, Računica, Rapaić, Mornar	HRnogomet.com
6	25 Sep	A	Inker Zaprešić	1 – 1	4,000	Hibić	HRnogomet.com
7	3 Oct	H	Segesta	1 – 1	2,000	Mornar	Slobodna Dalmacija
8	9 Oct	A	Varteks	1 – 3	15,000	Računica	HRnogomet.com
9	16 Oct	H	Šibenik	2 – 0	2,000	Računica, Mornar	HRnogomet.com
10	23 Oct	H	Zadar	3 – 0	1,000	Mornar, Računica, Kozniku	HRnogomet.com
11	30 Oct	A	Istra	1 – 0	5,000	Rapaić	HRnogomet.com
12	6 Nov	H	Cibalia	3 – 2	3,000	Miše, Vladislavić, Računica	HRnogomet.com
13	14 Nov	A	Belišće	0 – 2	1,500		Slobodna Dalmacija
14	20 Nov	H	NK Zagreb	4 – 0	5,000	Rapaić, Mornar, Kozniku (2)	HRnogomet.com
15	15 Nov	A	Radnik	3 – 1	4,000	Hibić (2), Pralija	HRnogomet.com
16	12 Dec	H	Rijeka	0 – 2	3,500		HRnogomet.com
17	19 Dec	A	Dubrava	4 – 3	4,500	Kozniku, Rapaić, Balajić, Osibov	HRnogomet.com
18	27 Feb	A	Primorac	2 – 0	3,500	Računica, Rapaić	HRnogomet.com
19	6 Mar	H	Dubrovnik	6 – 0	4,000	Kozniku, Miše, Mornar, Erceg (2), Pralija	HRnogomet.com
20	13 Mar	A	Pazinka	2 – 1	3,000	Miše, Mornar	HRnogomet.com
21	20 Mar	H	Osijek	3 – 1	5,000	Erceg, Pralija, Butorović	HRnogomet.com
22	27 Mar	A	Croatia Zagreb	0 – 4	35,000		HRnogomet.com
23	2 Apr	H	Inker Zaprešić	2 – 1	3,000	Miše, Kozniku	HRnogomet.com
24	10 Apr	A	Segesta	1 – 1	7,000	Računica	Slobodna Dalmacija
25	17 Apr	H	Varteks	2 – 0	15,000	Kozniku, Erceg	HRnogomet.com
26	24 Apr	A	Šibenik	0 – 0	10,000		Slobodna Dalmacija
29	11 May	A	Cibalia	0 – 1	6,000		HRnogomet.com
30	15 May	H	Belišće	4 – 2	6,000	Miše, Kozniku, Erceg (2)	HRnogomet.com
27	18 May	A	Zadar	1 – 1	6,000	Erceg	HRnogomet.com
28	22 May	H	Istra	4 – 1	5,000	Erceg (3), Kozniku	HRnogomet.com
31	29 May	A	NK Zagreb	1 – 0	10,000	Vulić	HRnogomet.com
32	5 Jun	H	Radnik	10 – 0	3,000	Miše, Erceg (3), Računica, Balajić (2), Rapaić (2), Pralija	HRnogomet.com
33	8 Jun	A	Rijeka	1 – 2	4,000	Balajić	HRnogomet.com
34	12 Jun	H	Dubrava	4 – 0	20,000	Kozniku (2), Vulić, Erceg	HRnogomet.com

Source: hajduk.hr

=== Croatian Football Cup ===
Round	Date	Venue	Opponent	Score	Attendance	Hajduk Scorers	Report
R1	17 Aug	H	Primorac (BnM)	11 – 0	300	Erceg (5), Računica (2), Osibov, Mornar, Filipović	HRnogomet.com
R1	22 Sep	AR	Primorac (BnM)	4 – 0	2,000	Butorović (2), Putnik, Jurić	HRnogomet.com
R2	12 Oct	H	Zadar	2 – 0	1,500	Računica, Filipović	HRnogomet.com
R2	26 Oct	AR	Zadar	2 – 0	2,000	Rapaić, Erceg	HRnogomet.com
QF	16 Mar	H	Dubrovnik	1 – 0	1,000	Kozniku	HRnogomet.com
QF	30 Mar	A	Dubrovnik	0 – 0	3,500		HRnogomet.com
SF	13 Apr	A	Rijeka	0 – 0	12,000		HRnogomet.com
SF	27 Apr	H	Rijeka	3 – 3	15,000	Hibić, Kozniku, Balajić	HRnogomet.com

Source: hajduk.hr

=== Cup Winners' Cup ===
Round	Date	Venue	Opponent	Score	Attendance	Hajduk Scorers	Report
R1	17 Sep	HR (Slovenia)	Ajax (Netherlands)	1 – 0	8,909	Mornar	UEFA.com
R1	29 Sep	A (Netherlands)	Ajax (Netherlands)	0 – 6	32,000		UEFA.com

Source: hajduk.hr

== Player seasonal records ==
=== Top scorers ===
Rank	Name	League	Europe	Cup	Supercup	Total
1	(Croatia) Tomislav Erceg	18	–	6	–	24
2	(Croatia) Dean Računica	12	–	4	1	17
3	(Croatia) Ardian Kozniku	12	–	2	–	14
4	(Croatia) Ivica Mornar	8	1	1	2	11
5	(Croatia) Milan Rapaić	8	–	1	–	9
6	(Croatia) Ante Miše	7	–	–	–	7
7	(Croatia) Stipe Balajić	5	–	1	–	6
7	(Croatia) Nenad Pralija	5	–	–	1	5
9	(Bosnia and Herzegovina) Mirsad Hibić	3	–	1	–	4
10	(Croatia) Darko Butorović	1	–	2	–	3
13	(Croatia) Zoran Vulić	2	–	–	–	2
13	(Croatia) Mario Osibov	1	–	2	–	2
13	(Croatia) Dalibor Filipović	–	–	2	–	2
14	(Croatia) Stjepan Andrijašević	1	–	–	–	1
14	(Croatia) Ivan Jurić	–	–	1	–	1
14	(Croatia) Denis Putnik	–	–	1	–	1
14	(Croatia) Robert Vladislavić	1	–	–	–	1
	TOTALS	84	1	24	4	113

Source: Competitive matches

== See also ==
- 1993–94 Croatian First Football League
- 1993–94 Croatian Football Cup

== External sources ==
- 1993–94 Prva HNL at HRnogomet.com
- 1993–94 Croatian Cup at HRnogomet.com
- 1993–94 European Cup Winners' Cup at rsssf.com
