= 1993 Croatian Football Super Cup =

Croatia Zagreb	Hajduk Split
4	4
- Hajduk Split won on away goals

First leg
Croatia Zagreb	Hajduk Split
4	4
- Date: 1 August 1993
- Venue: Stadion Maksimir, Zagreb
- Referee: Antun Burilo (Osijek)
- Attendance: 30,000

Second leg
Hajduk Split	Croatia Zagreb
0	0
- Date: 7 August 1993
- Venue: Stadion Poljud, Split
- Referee: Veljko Matković (Rijeka)
- Attendance: 30,000

The 1993 Croatian Football Super Cup was the second edition of the Croatian Football Super Cup, a two-legged affair contested between 1992–93 Croatian First League winners Croatia Zagreb and 1992–93 Croatian Football Cup winners Hajduk Split.

The first leg was played at Stadion Maksimir in Zagreb on 1 August 1993, while the second leg on 7 August 1993 at Stadion Poljud in Split.

== First leg ==
1 August 1993
20:15 CEST

Croatia Zagreb	4–4	Hajduk Split
Cvitanović 21'; Vlaović 41', 71'; Gašpar 64'	Report	Računica 15'; Mornar 43', 54'; Pralija 69'

Stadion Maksimir, Zagreb
Attendance: 30,000
Referee: Antun Burilo (Osijek)

CROATIA ZAGREB:
GK	(Croatia) Dražen Ladić
DF	(Croatia) Dževad Turković
DF	(Croatia) Zoran Živković	(substituted off) 55'
DF	(Croatia) Andrej Panadić
DF	(Croatia) Mirko Lulić
DF	(Croatia) Slavko Ištvanić
MF	(Croatia) Sead Halilović
MF	(Croatia) Mario Novaković
MF	(Croatia) Joško Jeličić
FW	(Croatia) Goran Vlaović
FW	(Croatia) Igor Cvitanović
Substitutes:
DF	(Croatia) Josip Gašpar	(substituted on) 55'
Manager:
(Croatia) Miroslav Blažević

HAJDUK SPLIT:
GK	(Croatia) Vatroslav Mihačić
DF	(Croatia) Srđan Mladinić
DF	(Bosnia and Herzegovina) Mirsad Hibić	(substituted off) 63'
DF	(Croatia) Joško Španjić
DF	(Croatia) Saša Peršon
MF	(Croatia) Stjepan Andrijašević
MF	(Croatia) Nenad Pralija
MF	(Croatia) Stipe Balajić
MF	(Croatia) Ivica Mornar	(substituted off) 75'
MF	(Croatia) Dean Računica
FW	(Croatia) Ardian Kozniku
Substitutes:
DF	(Croatia) Darko Butorović	(substituted on) 63'
DF	(Croatia) Robert Vladislavić	(substituted on) 75'
Manager:
(Croatia) Ivan Katalinić

Assistant referees:
Ivan Vranaričić (Đakovo)
Anđelko Brkić (Vinkovci)

Match rules

- 90 minutes.
- Five named substitutes.
- Maximum of two substitutions.

== Second leg ==
7 August 1993
20:15 CEST

Hajduk Split	0–0	Croatia Zagreb
	Report

Stadion Poljud, Split
Attendance: 30,000
Referee: Veljko Matković (Rijeka)

HAJDUK SPLIT:
GK	(Croatia) Vatroslav Mihačić
DF	(Croatia) Darko Butorović
DF	(Croatia) Srđan Mladinić
DF	(Croatia) Joško Španjić	(yellow card) 39'
DF	(Croatia) Saša Peršon
MF	(Croatia) Stjepan Andrijašević
MF	(Croatia) Nenad Pralija
MF	(Croatia) Stipe Balajić	(substituted off) 82'
MF	(Croatia) Ivica Mornar	(substituted off) 54'
MF	(Croatia) Dean Računica
FW	(Croatia) Ardian Kozniku
Substitutes:
MF	(Croatia) Milan Rapaić	(substituted on) 54'
DF	(Croatia) Mario Osibov	(substituted on) 82'
Manager:
(Croatia) Ivan Katalinić

CROATIA ZAGREB:
GK	(Croatia) Dražen Ladić
DF	(Croatia) Dževad Turković
DF	(Croatia) Damir Lesjak
DF	(Croatia) Andrej Panadić
DF	(Croatia) Josip Gašpar
DF	(Croatia) Slavko Ištvanić
MF	(Croatia) Sead Halilović
MF	(Croatia) Mario Novaković
FW	(Croatia) Goran Vlaović
MF	(Croatia) Joško Jeličić
FW	(Croatia) Igor Cvitanović	(substituted off) 69'
Substitutes:
FW	(Croatia) Željko Adžić	(substituted on) 70'
Manager:
(Croatia) Miroslav Blažević

Assistant referees:
Feručo Škrobonja (Kastav)
Veselko Bebek (Rijeka)

Match rules

- 90 minutes.
- Penalty shoot-out if scores still level; no extra time.
- Five named substitutes.
- Maximum of two substitutions.
