= Heart of Hajduk Award =

Heart of Hajduk (Croatian: Hajdučko srce) is an annual football award established in 1994 and officially awarded by the Hajduk Split supporters' association Torcida Split to the Hajduk player of the year.

The inaugural winner of the award was the midfielder Ante Miše, a key player in the squad which won the Croatian championship in the 1993–94 season. Two players have won the award twice, the striker Nenad Pralija in 1995 and 1996, and the goalkeeper Stipe Pletikosa in 2000 and 2002. Up to 2012, only three foreign players had received the award (Josip Skoko in 1998, Mirko Hrgović in 2007 and Senijad Ibričić in 2010), although they all hold Croatian citizenship.

In 2006, the title was not awarded because, according to supporters' judgment, none of the players deserved it following a string of bad results in both domestic competitions which saw Hajduk, widely considered a powerhouse in Croatian football, finishing fifth in the national championship and exiting the 2005–06 Croatian Cup in the semi-finals.

In 2009, the club had initially struggled to find its form, but improved later in the season and eventually finished second in the championship and runners-up in the 2008–09 Croatian Cup (after coming back from a 3–0 defeat to their biggest rivals Dinamo Zagreb in the first leg and then losing the final in a penalty shootout). The supporters' frustration with yet another trophyless season was further increased when Hajduk went through much turmoil related to the transformation of the debt-ridden club into a public limited company in summer 2009. In addition, the team experienced a series of humiliating results at the beginning of the 2009–10 season, and this all led to the cancellation of the award for the second time. On 11 August 2011, the award was posthumously awarded to the legendary Hajduk manager Tomislav Ivić, who died in June 2011. In August 2012, Heart of Hajduk was awarded to the youth academy.

== Winners ==
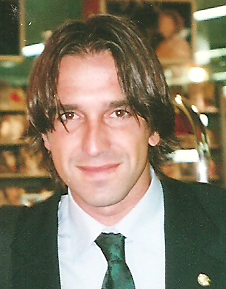
Nenad Pralija, the only player to have won the award in consecutive years (1995 and 1996)

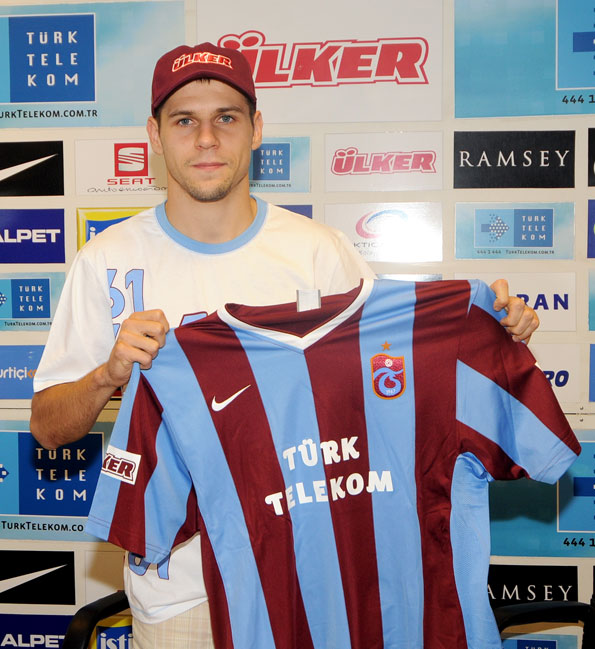
The 2009 winner, Drago Gabrić, pictured here posing with a Trabzonspor shirt after being transferred out from Hajduk in August 2009.

Names in bold indicate multiple winners.
International caps correct as of 18 August 2022.

Season	Name	Position	Nationality	Int. caps	Ref
1993–94	Ante Miše	Midfielder	CRO	7	
1994–95	**Nenad Pralija**	Midfielder	CRO	11	
1995–96	**Nenad Pralija**	Midfielder	CRO	11	
1996–97	Tonči Gabrić	Goalkeeper	CRO	9	
1997–98	Josip Skoko	Midfielder	AUS	51	
1998–99	Darko Miladin	Defender	CRO	1	
1999–2000	**Stipe Pletikosa**	Goalkeeper	CRO	114	
2000–01	Ivan Bošnjak	Forward	CRO	14	
2001–02	**Stipe Pletikosa**	Goalkeeper	CRO	114	
2002–03	Darijo Srna	Midfielder	CRO	134	
2003–04	Dean Računica	Midfielder	CRO	2	
2004–05	Vladimir Balić	Goalkeeper	CRO	0	
2005–06	Heart of Hajduk was not awarded.				
2006–07	Mirko Hrgović	Midfielder	BIH	29	
2007–08	Drago Gabrić	Midfielder	CRO	5	
2008–09	Heart of Hajduk was not awarded.				
2009–10	Senijad Ibričić	Midfielder	BIH	43	
2010–11	Tomislav Ivić	Coach	CRO	0	
2011–12	Youth academy	—	—	—	
2012–13	Goran Jozinović	Defender	CRO	0	
2013–14	Mario Pašalić	Midfielder	CRO	40	
2014–15	Heart of Hajduk was not awarded.				
2015–16	Heart of Hajduk was not awarded.				
2016–17	Ante Erceg	Midfielder	CRO	0	
2017–18	Heart of Hajduk was not awarded.				
2018–19	Heart of Hajduk was not awarded.				
2019–20	Heart of Hajduk was not awarded.				
2020–21	Heart of Hajduk was not awarded.				
2021–22	Marko Livaja	Forward	CRO	13	
2022–23	Youth academy	—	—	—	
2023–24	Heart of Hajduk was not awarded.				

== See also ==
- Hajduk Split
- Torcida Split
