= 1993–94 Croatian Football Cup =

Tournament details
- Country: Croatia
- Teams: 32

Final positions
- Champions: Croatia Zagreb (1st title)
- Runners-up: Rijeka

Tournament statistics
- Matches played: 62
- Goals scored: 197 (3.18 per match)
- Top goal scorer: Joško Popović (9)

The 1993–94 Croatian Football Cup was the third edition of Croatia's football knockout competition. Hajduk Split were the defending champions, and the cup was won by Croatia Zagreb.

== Calendar ==
Round	Main date	Number of fixtures	Clubs	New entries this round
First round	First legs 13 and 16 August 1993, Second legs 31 August 1993	32	32 → 16	None
Second round	First legs 11 and 12 October 1993, Second legs 26 October 1993	16	16 → 8	None
Quarter-finals	First legs 15 and 16 March 1994, Second legs 30 March 1994	8	8 → 4	None
Semi-finals	First legs 13 and 14 April 1994, Second legs 27 April 1994	4	4 → 2	None
Final	First leg 1 June 1994, Second leg 15 June 1994	2	2 → 1	None

== First round ==
Team 1	Agg.	Team 2	1st leg	2nd leg
Gusar Komin	0–3	Šibenik	0–3	0–0
Moslavina	2–11	Osijek	0–5	2–6
Hajduk Split	15–0	Primorac Biograd na Moru	11–0	4–0
Varteks	7–1	Zagorec Krapina	7–0	0–1
Baranja Beli Manastir	1–11	Cibalia	0–4	1–7
Špansko	1–5	Belišće	0–3	1–2
Inker Zaprešić	8–2	Đakovo Certissa	5–0	3–2
Metalac Osijek	0–2	Pazinka	0–1	0–1
Dubrovnik	1–1 (5–4 p)	Čelik Križevci	1–0	0–1
NK Zagreb	3–1	Orijent	3–0	0–1
Rijeka	6–2	Budućnost Hodošan	3–0	3–2
Radnik Velika Gorica	1–4	Bjelovar	1–1	0–3
Sesvete	0–6	Zadar	0–3	0–3
Croatia Zagreb	5–1	Marsonia	5–0	0–1
Mladost Cernik	1–17	Segesta	1–3	0–14
Rovinj	3–5	Istra Pula	2–4	1–1

== Second round ==
Team 1	Agg.	Team 2	1st leg	2nd leg
Cibalia	1–4	Varteks	0–0	1–4
Inker Zaprešić	3–3 (a)	Segesta	3–2	0–1
Belišće	1–4	Rijeka	0–0	1–4
Pazinka	1–5	NK Zagreb	0–1	1–4
Osijek	2–3	Dubrovnik	1–0	1–3
Hajduk Split	4–0	Zadar	2–0	2–0
Croatia Zagreb	4–2	Šibenik	1–0	3–2
Istra Pula	1–1 (a)	Bjelovar	1–1	0–0

== Quarter-finals ==
Team 1	Agg.	Team 2	1st leg	2nd leg
Croatia Zagreb	2–2 (a)	Varteks	1–0	1–2
Bjelovar	1–4	Rijeka	1–0	0–4
Hajduk Split	1–0	Dubrovnik	1–0	0–0
NK Zagreb	5–3	Segesta	2–2	3–1

== Semi-finals ==
13 April 1994
18:15

Rijeka	0–0	Hajduk Split
	Report

Stadion Kantrida, Rijeka
Attendance: 12,000
Referee: Darko Cvitković (Zagreb)
27 April 1994
17:30

Hajduk Split	3–3	Rijeka
Hibić 7'; Kozniku 36'; Balajić 64'	Report	Raković 1'; Praženica 46' (o.g.); Pavličić 48'

Stadion Poljud, Split
Attendance: 15,000
Referee: Dragutin Poljak (Zagreb)

3–3 on aggregate, Rijeka won on away goals rule.

13 April 1994
19:00

NK Zagreb	2–2	Croatia Zagreb
Popović 23', 40'	Report	Cvitanović 44'; Vlaović 79'

Stadion Kranjčevićeva, Zagreb
Attendance: 12,000
Referee: Veljko Matković (Rijeka)
27 April 1994
20:00

Croatia Zagreb	1–0	NK Zagreb
Vlaović 90' (pen.)	Report

Stadion Maksimir, Zagreb
Attendance: 10,000
Referee: Željko Širić (Osijek)

Croatia Zagreb won 4–1 on aggregate.

== Final ==
=== First leg ===
1 June 1994
20:00

Croatia Zagreb	2–0	Rijeka
Turković 12'; Cvitanović 48'	Report

Stadion Maksimir, Zagreb
Attendance: 15,000
Referee: Veljko Matković (Rijeka)

=== Second leg ===
15 June 1994
20:10

Rijeka	1–0	Croatia Zagreb
Pavličić 3'	Report

Stadion Kantrida, Rijeka
Attendance: 15,000
Referee: Darko Cvitković (Zagreb)

Croatia Zagreb won 2–1 on aggregate.

== See also ==
- 1993–94 Croatian First Football League
- 1993–94 Croatian Second Football League
