= Ante Miše =

Croatian footballer and manager

Personal information
- Full name: Ante Miše
- Date of birth: 14 June 1967 (age 59)
- Place of birth: Vukovar, SR Croatia, SFR Yugoslavia
- Position: Midfielder

Youth career
- Borovo

Senior career*
Years	Team	Apps	(Gls)
1985–1994	Hajduk Split	120	(18)
1989–1990	→ Borac Banja Luka (loan)	28	(4)
1994–1997	Vitesse	40	(1)
1997–2003	Hajduk Split	89	(0)
2003–2005	Mura	28	(1)
Total		305	(24)

International career
1992–1994	Croatia	7	(0)

Managerial career
- Dugopolje
- Mosor
- 2008: Trogir
- 2008–2009: Hajduk Split
- 2010: Istra 1961
- 2011: Hajduk Split
- 2011–2012: Dugopolje
- 2013–2014: Vitez
- 2014–2015: Vitez
- 2015–2017: Croatia (assistant)
- 2018: Zrinjski Mostar
- 2019–2020: Turkmenistan
- 2020–2022: Al-Arabi SC
- 2022–2023: Al-Faisaly
- 2023: Al-Adalah
- 2024–: Al-Salmiya
- * Club domestic league appearances and goals

Ante Miše (born 14 June 1967) is a Croatian football manager and former professional football player who played as a midfielder.

As a player, he earned 7 caps in friendlies for Croatia in the period from 1992 to 1994.

== Playing career ==
=== Club ===
In the 1980s and 90s spent most of his career at Hajduk Split. During his playing career with Hajduk he won the Yugoslav cup, three Croatian titles and three Croatian cups. He started his football career in NK Borovo and also played for Vitesse Arnhem in the Netherlands and Mura Murska Sobota in Slovenia.

=== International ===
He made his debut for Croatia in a July 1992 friendly match away against Australia and earned a total of 7 caps, scoring no goals. His final international was an April 1994 friendly away against Slovakia.

== Managerial career ==
After retirement he started coaching and after spending a few seasons coaching lower level sides became Goran Vučević's assistant at Hajduk in the 2008–09 season. Following Vučević's resignation in October 2008, he was appointed caretaker manager at the club and Hajduk immediately improved performance, with Hajduk winning in all of their next six league fixtures which saw them rise to second place just 1 point behind their fierce rivals Dinamo Zagreb at the winter break. He was sacked as manager at Hajduk Split on 3 August 2009, one day after a 1–0 defeat at home to NK Zadar in their second league match of the 2009–10 season.

In May 2010, he was appointed new manager at Istra 1961 in the Croatian first division. However, after losing the opening two matches of the 2010–11 league season (6–1 at Hajduk Split and 2–0 at home to NK Zagreb), he was sacked on 3 August 2010 and replaced by Robert Jarni the following day.

From November 2013 until June 2014, and from September 2014 to April 2015, Miše managed Bosnian Premier League Vitez. In September 2015, he became an assistant coach of the Croatia national team in the staff of head coach Ante Čačić.

From June to August 2018, Miše managed another Bosnian Premier League club, Zrinjski Mostar.

=== Turkmenistan ===
In March 2019, the Football Federation of Turkmenistan named Miše as the head coach of the Turkmenistan national football team, signing a one-year contract. Croatian specialist Sandro Tomić will help to train the national team of Turkmenistan. Croatian coaches are set to develop the overall football in Turkmenistan, not just the national team. His first game, 3-month later, was a 0–0 draw at friendly match with Uganda.

In March 2020, due to the expiration of the contract and the postponement of matches of the 2022 FIFA World Cup qualification in Asia, left from Turkmenistan with goalkeeper coach Sandro Tomic. The national team of Turkmenistan, playing in the qualifying tournament of the World Cup 2022, took first place in the group at the time of his departure for the first time ever.

=== Al-Arabi SC ===
In December of 2020, Miše was named manager of Al-Arabi Sporting Club. In his first season, he led the team to win the Kuwait Premier League for the first time in 19 years in the 2020–21 season without any loss. In the following season, he won the 2021 Kuwait Super Cup which was played in February 2022 against Kuwait SC, and won the Kuwait Crown Prince Cup 2021–22.

=== Al-Faisaly ===
On 12 July 2022, Miše was appointed as manager of Saudi Arabian club Al-Faisaly. On 19 January 2023, Miše was sacked. He was assisted by Ardian Kozniku at both Arabi and Faisaly.

=== Al-Adalah ===
On 16 June 2023, Miše was appointed as manager of Saudi First Division side Al-Adalah. He was sacked on 15 December 2023.

== Managerial statistics ==
As of match played 7 November 2023

Managerial record by team and tenure
Team	From	To	Record				
Team	From	To	G	W	D	L	Win %
Trogir	January 2008	May 2008	13	5	4	4	38.46
Hajduk Split	November 2008	August 2009	8	6	2	0	75.00
Istra 1961	May 2010	July 2010	2	0	2	0	0.00
Hajduk Split	April 2011	May 2011	5	2	2	1	40.00
Vitez	November 2013	June 2014	17	8	2	7	47.06
Vitez	September 2014	April 2015	18	3	5	10	16.67
Zrinjski Mostar	June 2018	August 2018	9	3	2	4	33.33
Turkmenistan	March 2019	March 2020	7	3	2	2	42.86
Al-Arabi	December 2020	July 2022	48	29	10	9	60.42
Al-Faisaly	12 July 2022	19 January 2023	17	10	4	3	58.82
Al-Adalah	16 June 2023	15 December 2023	14	8	2	4	57.14
Total			158	77	37	44	48.73

== Personal life ==
In addition of his Croatian, Ante also learned to speak English and Russian when he coached Turkmenistan.

== Honours ==
=== Player ===
Hajduk Split

- 1. HNL: 1992, 1993–94, 2000–01
- Yugoslav Cup: 1990–91
- Croatian Cup: 1992–93, 1999–2000, 2002–03

=== Individual ===
Awards

- Heart of Hajduk Award: 1994

=== Al-Arabi SC ===
- Kuwait Premier League: 2020–21
- Kuwait Crown Prince Cup: 2021–22
- Kuwait Super Cup: 2021

Awards
Preceded by None	Heart of Hajduk Award; 1994	Succeeded by Nenad Pralija
