= Domagoj Boljat =

Croatian football player

Personal information
- Date of birth: 25 January 1991 (age 35)
- Place of birth: Split, Croatia
- Position: Midfielder

Team information
- Current team: Sloga Mravince

Youth career
- –2010: Hajduk Split

Senior career*
Years	Team	Apps	(Gls)
2010–2011	Hajduk Split	0	(0)
2011	Primorac Stobreč		
2012–2013	Mosor	29	(2)
2013–2014	Zadar	2	(0)
2014–2016	Primorac Stobreč		
2016	Mosor		
2016–2017	RNK Split	26	(1)
2017–2018	Bisceglie	10	(0)
2020–	Sloga Mravince		
- * Club domestic league appearances and goals as of 6 May 2018

Domagoj Boljat (born 25 January 1991) is a Croatian football player who plays for HNK Sloga Mravince.

== Club career ==
He made his Croatian First Football League debut for Zadar on 4 August 2013 in a game against Rijeka.
