= Ivica Mornar =

Croatian former footballer

Personal information
- Full name: Ivica Mornar
- Date of birth: 12 January 1974 (age 52)
- Place of birth: Split, SFR Yugoslavia
- Height: 1.86 m (6 ft 1 in)
- Position: Forward

Senior career*
Years	Team	Apps	(Gls)
1991–1995	Hajduk Split	79	(26)
1995–1996	Eintracht Frankfurt	19	(1)
1996–1997	Sevilla	11	(2)
1997–1998	Ourense	28	(8)
1998–2001	Standard Liège	68	(23)
2001–2004	Anderlecht	59	(24)
2004–2006	Portsmouth	10	(1)
2004–2005	→ Rennes (loan)	15	(0)
Total		289	(85)

International career
1994–1995	Croatia U-21	5	(1)
1994–2004	Croatia	22	(1)
- * Club domestic league appearances and goals

Ivica Mornar (born 12 January 1974) is a Croatian retired footballer. He started as a striker, but was mostly deployed as a winger during his career.

Mornar began his career with Hajduk Split before going on to play for Eintracht Frankfurt, Sevilla, CD Ourense, Standard Liège, Anderlecht and Portsmouth.

== Club career ==
Mornar was born in Split.

In Mornar's final season at Anderlecht, he scored a goal in a 1–1 home draw against Bayern Munich on 30 September 2003.

He was offered a new two-year contract by Anderlecht, but opted to move across the English channel to Portsmouth. He moved to the Premier League at the end of January 2004 for £500,000, signing a two-and-a-half-year deal.

Mornar made his Pompey debut in a goalless draw at home to Wolverhampton, and looked lively. He then scored his first and only goal in the next game against Tottenham. He played as a winger in most of his Portsmouth appearances.

However, Mornar failed to recreate his previous form at Portsmouth. Seemingly out of the picture at the club, he was loaned to Rennes of the French Ligue 1 for the 2004–05 season, with then Pompey manager Harry Redknapp saying that he would allow Mornar to be sold upon his return. Although it appeared that Mornar was in new boss Alain Perrin's plans for the 2005–06 campaign, he was thwarted by hamstring injuries throughout the season. Upon the return of Harry Redknapp as manager in December 2005 it looked as though Mornar's contract would be allowed to expire the next Summer. However, it transpired that there was a clause in his contract guaranteeing him a further year at the club should relegation be avoided and he remained a Portsmouth player, until September 2006 when his contract with the club was cancelled by mutual consent. This brought further complications due to the fact that Mornar could not find a club willing to sign him. Despite his unceremonious exit from Portsmouth he enjoyed his time playing there and persuaded fellow Split native Niko Kranjčar to join the club. Reportedly he offered his services to first league teams from Belgium, Scotland, Portugal and Japan but no team was interested, thereby forcing his retirement.

== International career ==
Mornar made his debut for Croatia in a March 1994 friendly match away against Spain, coming on as a 46th-minute substitute for Janko Janković, but was replaced himself by Ante Miše after being on the pitch for just over half an hour. He was capped 22 times and scored one goal for his country against England. Mornar represented Croatia at Euro 2004. His final international was a September 2004 World Cup qualification match against Hungary.

== Career statistics ==
=== Club ===
Club performance			League		Cup		League Cup		Continental		Total	
Season	Club	League	Apps	Goals	Apps	Goals	Apps	Goals	Apps	Goals	Apps	Goals
Croatia			League		Croatian Cup		Super Cup		Europe		Total	
1990–91	Hajduk Split	Yugoslav First League	2	1	0	0	–		1	0	3	1
1992	Hajduk Split	Prva HNL	19	7	2	0	–		–		21	7
1992–93	Hajduk Split	Prva HNL	21	7	8	1	1	0	–		30	8
1993–94	Hajduk Split	Prva HNL	27	8	5	1	2	2	2	1	36	12
1994–95	Hajduk Split	Prva HNL	9	3	6	0	1	1	7	0	23	4
1995–96	Hajduk Split	Prva HNL	1	0	–		–		2	0	3	0
Germany			League		DFB-Pokal		Other		Europe		Total	
1995–96	Eintracht Frankfurt	Bundesliga	19	2	0	0	–		–		19	2
Spain			League		Copa del Rey		Supercopa de España		Europe		Total	
1996–97	Sevilla	La Liga	11	2	3	0	–		–		14	2
1997–98	Ourense	Segunda División	28	8	3	0	–		–		31	8
Belgium			League		Belgian Cup		Super Cup		Europe		Total	
1998–99	Standard Liège	First Division	15	3	–		–		–		15	3
1999–00	Standard Liège	First Division	23	8	5	0	–		–		28	8
2000–01	Standard Liège	First Division	30	12	2	0	–		2	1	34	13
2001–02	Anderlecht	First Division	23	8	1	2	1	0	7	2	32	12
2002–03	Anderlecht	First Division	20	6	2	1	–		3	0	25	7
2003–04	Anderlecht	First Division	16	10	2	1	–		8	1	26	12
England			League		FA Cup		League Cup		Europe		Total	
2003–04	Portsmouth	Premier League	8	1	2	0	–		–		10	1
France			League		Coupe de France		Coupe de la Ligue		Europe		Total	
2004–05	Stade Rennais	Ligue 1	15	0	–		–		–		15	0
England			League		FA Cup		League Cup		Europe		Total	
2005–06	Portsmouth	Premier League	2	0	–		–		–		2	0
Total	Croatia		77	25	21	2	4	3	12	1	114	31
Total	Germany		19	2	0	0	0	0	0	0	19	2
Total	Spain		39	10	6	0	0	0	0	0	45	10
Total	Belgium		127	47	12	4	1	0	20	4	160	55
Total	England		10	1	2	0	0	0	0	0	12	1
Total	France		15	0	0	0	0	0	0	0	15	0
Career total			268	78	41	6	5	3	32	5	346	92

=== International goals ===
#	Date	Venue	Opponent	Score	Result	Competition
01.	20 August 2003	Portman Road, Ipswich, England	England	2 − 1	3 − 1	Friendly

== Honours ==
=== Club ===
Hajduk Split

- Prva HNL (3): 1992, 1993–94, 1994–95
- Croatian Cup (2): 1992–93, 1994–95
- Croatian Supercup (2): 1993, 1994

Sevilla

- Trofeo Colombino (1): 1996

R.S.C. Anderlecht

- Belgian First Division (1): 2003–04
- Belgian Super Cup (1): 2001
