= Danilo Butorović =

Croatian football coach (born 1984)

Personal information
- Date of birth: 25 July 1984 (age 42)
- Place of birth: Rijeka, SR Croatia, Yugoslavia

Team information
- Current team: Croatia (assistant)

Managerial career
- Years: Team
- 2016–2018: HNK Orijent 1919
- 2018–2019: Al-Ittihad (assistant)
- 2019–2020: West Bromwich Albion (assistant)
- 2021–2022: Beijing Guoan (assistant)
- 2022–2023: Watford (assistant)
- 2023–2024: Al-Fateh (assistant)
- 2026–: Croatia (assistant)

Danilo Butorović (pronounced [dǎnilo bûtorovitɕ]; born 25 July 1984) is a Croatian professional football coach who is currently an assistant coach of the Croatian national team to head coach Slaven Bilić.

== Coaching career ==
Butorović played football until the age of 17, when he suffered a bike accident which kept him out of action for several months. During this period he decided to focus on a coaching career rather than a playing one. He began studying to become a coach and earned his UEFA Pro licence and coaching badges from the Croatian FA.

Butorović began his coaching career as manager of Croatian club HNK Orijent 1919. Taking charge in 2016, during a time when the club was going through liquidation and were reformed. At the beginning of his first season Orijent were bottom of the fourth tier of Croatian football however by the time he departed the club two seasons later, they were competing for promotion to the second tier (something they have now achieved).

Butorović left Orijent for the position of assistant manager at Al-Ittihad. He had been brought over by Slaven Bilić, who he had a relationship with dating back to when he went to Bilić's West Ham training camp whilst he was serving as manager of the club. Butorović left Al-Ittihad along with Bilić and his assistants after a disappointing start to the season.

In June 2019, Butorović was appointed Assistant Head Coach of English club West Bromwich Albion again working as assistant to manager Slaven Bilić, along with fellow assistant Dean Računica who both served as assistants to Bilić at Al-Ittihad.
