= Boris Rapaić =

Croatian footballer

Personal information
- Full name: Boris Rapaić
- Date of birth: 24 October 1997 (age 29)
- Place of birth: Split, Croatia
- Height: 1.82 m (6 ft 0 in)
- Position: Forward

Team information
- Current team: Dugopolje
- Number: 10

Youth career
- Dugopolje
- 2007–2016: Hajduk Split
- 2015–2016: → Internazionale (loan)

Senior career*
Years	Team	Apps	(Gls)
2016–2017	Hajduk II		
2018	Fenerbahçe A2	13	(10)
2019–2020	Las Palmas B	1	(0)
2019	Las Palmas	1	(0)
2021-	Dugopolje	4	(0)

International career
2012	Croatia U16	1	(0)
2014	Croatia U18	1	(0)
2015	Croatia U19	2	(0)
- * Club domestic league appearances and goals as of 19 June 2023

Boris Rapaić (born 24 October 1997) is a Croatian footballer who plays as a forward for Hajduk.

== Club career ==
Born in Split, Rapaić joined HNK Hajduk Split in 2007, from NK Dugopolje. In January 2015, he moved abroad after agreeing to an initial six-month loan deal with Inter Milan. He returned to Hajduk in July 2016, and started to appear with the reserve team.

In February 2018, Rapaić joined Fenerbahçe SK and was assigned to their under-21 (A2) squad. In July he was released, and subsequently had trials at Royal Antwerp FC.

On 24 July 2019, Rapaić switched teams and countries again after signing for UD Las Palmas; he was initially assigned to the B-team in Segunda División B. He made his professional debut on 18 August, coming on as a second-half substitute for Rubén Castro in a 0–1 home loss against SD Huesca in the Segunda División championship.

On 31 January 2020, after one appearance for the main squad and one for the B-side, Rapaić terminated his contract with the Canarians.

== Personal life ==
Rapaić's father Milan was also a footballer. An attacking midfielder, he also started his career at Hajduk.
