= Ivan Katalinić =

Croatian footballer (born 1951)

Personal information
- Date of birth: 17 May 1951 (age 75)
- Place of birth: Trogir, PR Croatia, FPR Yugoslavia
- Height: 1.84 m (6 ft 0 in)
- Position: Goalkeeper

Youth career
- 1964–1970: Slaven Trogir

Senior career*
Years	Team	Apps	(Gls)
1969–1970	Slaven Trogir	25	(0)
1970–1979	Hajduk Split	122	(0)
1980–1983	Southampton	48	(0)
1983–1984	Hajduk Split	0	(0)
Total		195	(0)

International career
1977–1978	Yugoslavia	13	(0)

Managerial career
- 1983–1993: Hajduk Split (assistant)
- 1993–1995: Hajduk Split
- 1996: Osijek
- 1996–2002: Croatia (assistant)
- 1996–1997: Hapoel Haifa
- 1997–1998: Zadar
- 1998–1999: Hajduk Split
- 1999–2000: Al-Ittihad
- 2000–2001: Varteks
- 2001–2002: Rijeka
- 2002: NK Zagreb
- 2003: Metalurh Zaporizhzhia
- 2003–2004: Rijeka
- 2004: Hajduk Split
- 2004–2005: Al-Riffa
- 2005–2006: Dinamo Tirana
- 2006: Dunaújváros
- 2007–2008: GOŠK Gabela
- 2008: Posušje
- 2008–2009: Široki Brijeg
- 2009–2010: Dugopolje
- 2010–2011: RNK Split
- 2012–2013: GOŠK Gabela
- 2013: Slaven Belupo
- 2013: Jedinstvo Bihać
- 2016: Šibenik
Medal record
Men's football
Representing Croatia (assistant)
FIFA World Cup
Bronze medal – third place	1998 France
- * Club domestic league appearances and goals

Ivan Katalinić (born 17 May 1951) is a Croatian former footballer and former manager who had a successful playing career with Hajduk Split and Southampton in the 1970s and 1980s. As a member of Hajduk's famous "golden generation" of the 1970s, he won four Yugoslav championships and five consecutive cups.

In early 1980, he moved to Southampton where he stayed for three and a half seasons. On his return from England, Katalinić once again joined Hajduk becoming part of the coaching staff and a third choice goalkeeper for the 1983–84 season.

So far in his managerial career Katalinić has managed 17 clubs. Most success was achieved with Hajduk from 1993 until 1995. Two Croatian championships and cups were won along with two supercups. Season 1994–95 is remembered as the most successful in Hajduk's history. Besides winning the double, Hajduk reached quarterfinals of the Champions League. From 1996 until 2002 he was part of the Croatian national team's coaching staff that led Croatia to bronze medal in the World Cup 1998.

== Club career ==
Despite signing his first professional contract with Hajduk in the summer of 1970, Katalinić had to wait more than a year for his debut. The long-awaited day occurred on 29 September 1971, when he came on as a substitute for injured Radomir Vukčević in the European Cup first-round return-leg in Split, against Valencia. However, in the face of stiff competition Katalinić would not become first-choice goalkeeper until 1975. He then kept the number one jersey for the following two seasons, before losing it due to military service, which was obligatory at the time. Upon his return from the army in May 1979, Katalinić played only one game, adding just three more at the beginning of the following season: transfer abroad was on the horizon. After trials with West Bromwich Albion and Derby County, followed by unsuccessful attempts to gain his work permit, Katalinić finally made a breakthrough with Southampton.

After signing a four-year contract with Southampton in February 1980, Katalinić became the first Croatian ever to play in the First Division (today known as the Premier League). To date, he remains the only Croatian goalkeeper to have played in the English top-flight. During the next two and a half years he made 54 appearances for Southampton in all competitions. For the 1982–83 season Southampton signed England goalkeeper Peter Shilton, whose arrival moved Katalinić to the bench. After cancelling his contract with Southampton in the summer of 1983, he signed with Hajduk as a third-choice goalkeeper and an assistant coach.

== International career ==
As a goalkeeper, Katalinić was capped 13 times for Yugoslavia national team. His debut came on 30 January 1977 when Yugoslavia beat Colombia 1–0 at Estadio El Campín in Bogotá and his last game was in Rome on 18 May 1978 versus Italy at stadio Olimpico in a scoreless draw.

=== Style of play ===
Due to his calmness and composure on the field, Katalinić was nicknamed "Banks". He was described as having excellent reflexes, and was particularly skilled in one-on-one duels with the opposing players. Katalinić also had the ability to read the game and predict the offensive action well in advance, which he used to alert and direct the defence.

== Managerial career ==
After ten years on Hajduk's coaching staff as an assistant and goalkeeper coach, in March 1993 Katalinić was appointed as a manager. Under his helm, two months later, Hajduk won Croatian Cup after two legged final against great rival Dinamo Zagreb. The following season Hajduk were champions of Croatia and in 1994–95 first Croatian double crown was rounded with Champions League quarterfinal clash with eventual winners Ajax. Following season Hajduk failed to qualify for the Champions League after losing to Panathinaikos. Two months later Katalinić resigned after being knocked out of the Croatian Cup. In 1996–97 came his first managerial job abroad when he signed a one-year contract with Hapoel Haifa. Return to Croatia followed where he took over minnows Zadar leading them to championship play-offs. Second spell with Hajduk followed but no trophies were won.

In the new century Katalinić had two more attempts but did not manage to qualify for the Champions League. With Zagreb, in 2002, he failed to overcome ZTE while two years later short episode with Hajduk ended soon after crushing out against Shelbourne. He coached Rijeka on two occasions, saving them from relegation in his first spell with the club. However, in Ukraine Katalinić's effort was not enough to save Metalurh Zaporizhzhia from the drop. After five years of coaching abroad (Bahrain, Albania, Hungary, Bosnia and Herzegovina) in the summer of 2009 Katalinić surprised many with his move to ambitious Croatian Third Division side Dugopolje.

Katalinić led Dugopolje to its historic first promotion to the Croatian Second Division. In June 2010 return to First Division football followed as he signed a contract with RNK Split. He led them to the third position in 2010–11 Prva HNL, and for the first time in the club's history reaching a spot in European competitions. After progressing past Domžale in the second qualifying round of 2011–12 UEFA Europa League, they were eliminated by Fulham. In August 2011, he was sacked as manager as the board was unsatisfied with the results made in the beginning of the season. In September 2012, Katalinić took over the helm of GOŠK Gabela for the second time. In May 2013, he became the manager of Slaven Belupo.

In July 2016, Katalinić was named the manager of Šibenik, but after the team lost to NK Zagreb, and continued a poor series, he was sacked on 9 October 2016.

== Managerial statistics ==
Club	From	To	Competition	Record				
Club	From	To	Competition	P	W	D	L	Win %
Hajduk Split	19 May 1993	25 October 1995	Prva HNL	92	58	20	14	63.04
Hajduk Split	19 May 1993	25 October 1995	Croatian Cup	24	14	7	3	58.33
Hajduk Split	19 May 1993	25 October 1995	Croatian Super Cup	4	1	2	1	25.00
Hajduk Split	19 May 1993	25 October 1995	UEFA Champions League	12	4	5	3	33.33
Hajduk Split	19 May 1993	25 October 1995	European Cup Winners' Cup	2	1	0	1	50.00
Hajduk Split Total				134	78	34	22	58.21
NK Osijek	6 April 1996	12 May 1996	Prva HNL	6	2	0	4	33.33
NK Osijek Total				6	2	0	4	33.33
NK Zadarkomerc	31 August 1997	10 May 1998	Prva HNL	27	10	4	13	37.04
NK Zadarkomerc	31 August 1997	10 May 1998	Croatian Cup	1	0	0	1	0.00
NK Zadarkomerc Total				28	10	4	14	35.71
Hajduk Split	7 August 1998	25 September 1999	Prva HNL	39	22	10	7	56.41
Hajduk Split	7 August 1998	25 September 1999	Croatian Cup	7	5	1	1	71.43
Hajduk Split	7 August 1998	25 September 1999	UEFA Cup	8	2	4	2	25.00
Hajduk Split Total				54	29	15	10	53.70
Varteks	29 July 2000	29 April 2001	Prva HNL	27	9	8	10	33.33
Varteks	29 July 2000	29 April 2001	Croatian Cup	4	2	0	2	50.00
Varteks Total				31	11	8	12	35.48
HNK Rijeka	26 May 2001	4 May 2002	Prva HNL	34	18	6	10	52.94
HNK Rijeka	26 May 2001	4 May 2002	Croatian Cup	4	1	1	2	25.00
HNK Rijeka Total				38	19	7	12	50.00
NK Zagreb	20 July 2002	7 August 2002	Prva HNL	2	1	1		50.00
NK Zagreb	20 July 2002	7 August 2002	Croatian Super Cup	1	0	1	0	0.00
NK Zagreb	20 July 2002	7 August 2002	UEFA Champions League	2	1	0	1	50.00
NK Zagreb Total				5	2	2	1	40.00
HNK Rijeka	2 August 2003	15 May 2004	Prva HNL	31	11	9	11	35.48
HNK Rijeka	2 August 2003	15 May 2004	Croatian Cup	6	5	0	1	83.33
HNK Rijeka Total				37	16	9	12	43.24
Hajduk Split	17 July 2004	21 August 2004	Prva HNL	5	2	1	2	40.00
Hajduk Split	17 July 2004	21 August 2004	Croatian Super Cup	1	1	0	0	100.00
Hajduk Split	17 July 2004	21 August 2004	UEFA Champions League	2	1	0	1	50.00
Hajduk Split Total				8	4	1	3	50.00
Dinamo Tirana	18 November 2005	15 February 2006	Superliga	11	5	3	3	45.45
Dinamo Tirana Total				11	5	3	3	45.45
Široki Brijeg	17 July 2008	23 May 2009	Premier League	30	14	3	13	46.67
Široki Brijeg	17 July 2008	23 May 2009	Bosnian Cup	7	4	0	3	57.14
Široki Brijeg	17 July 2008	23 May 2009	UEFA Cup	7	4	0	3	57.14
Široki Brijeg Total				44	22	3	19	50.00
NK Dugopolje	29 August 2009	29 May 2010	Treća HNL (South)	32	22	5	5	68.75
NK Dugopolje Total				32	22	5	5	68.75
RNK Split	24 July 2010	14 August 2011	Prva HNL	34	17	7	10	50.00
RNK Split	24 July 2010	14 August 2011	UEFA Cup	4	2	1	1	50.00
RNK Split Total				38	19	8	11	50.00
GOŠK Gabela	5 September 2012	10 January 2013	Premier League	10	1	5	4	10.00
GOŠK Gabela	5 September 2012	10 January 2013	Bosnian Cup	5	2	2	1	40.00
GOŠK Gabela Total				15	3	7	5	20.00
Slaven Belupo	14 July 2013	21 September 2013	Prva HNL	10	1	2	7	10.00
Slaven Belupo Total				10	1	2	7	10.00
Jedinstvo Bihać	28 September 2013	23 November 2013	First League	9	6	2	1	66.67
Jedinstvo Bihać Total				9	6	2	1	66.67
HNK Šibenik	19 August 2016	8 October 2016	Druga HNL	10	4	2	4	40.00
HNK Šibenik	19 August 2016	8 October 2016	Croatian Cup	1	1	0	0	100.00
HNK Šibenik Total				11	5	2	4	45.45
Totals				511	254	106	151	49.71

== Honours ==
=== Player ===
Hajduk Split

- Yugoslav First League: 1970–71, 1973–74, 1974–75, 1978–79
- Yugoslav Cup: 1971–72, 1973, 1974, 1975–76, 1976–77

=== Manager ===
Hajduk Split

- Croatian First League: 1993–94, 1994–95
- Croatian Cup: 1992–93, 1994–95
- Croatian Super Cup: 1993, 1994, 2004

Dugopolje

- Croatian Third League: 2009–10 (South)

Individual

- Tempo magazine Award for Best Yugoslav goalkeeper: 1975–76
- Trophy Bili for the best Hajduk player: 1976–77
- Daily Star Golden Glove Award for the best First Division goalkeeper of the month: December 1981
- Supersport (weekly magazine published by Sportske Novosti) Croatian Coach of the Year: 1994, 1995
- City of Split Sport Federation Award for the city of Split Coach of the Year: 1994, 1995
