= Milan Rapaić =

Croatian footballer

Personal information
- Full name: Milan Rapaić
- Date of birth: 16 August 1973 (age 53)
- Place of birth: Nova Gradiška, SR Croatia, Yugoslavia
- Height: 1.83 m (6 ft 0 in)
- Positions: Attacking midfielder; winger

Senior career*
Years	Team	Apps	(Gls)
1991–1996	Hajduk Split	84	(20)
1996–2000	Perugia	121	(20)
2000–2002	Fenerbahçe	51	(15)
2003	Hajduk Split	11	(3)
2003–2004	Ancona	13	(4)
2004–2007	Standard Liège	62	(17)
2008	Trogir	7	(1)
Total		349	(80)

International career^{‡}
1994–2007	Croatia	49	(5)
- * Club domestic league appearances and goals as of 15 July 2007 ‡ National team caps and goals as of 12 September 2007

Milan Rapaić (born 16 August 1973) is a Croatian former professional footballer who played as a midfielder. He primarily played as an attacking midfielder or winger.

== International career ==
He made his debut for Croatia in an April 1994 friendly match away against Slovakia, coming on as a 46th-minute substitute for Darko Vukić, and earned a total of 49 caps, scoring 5 goals.

Rapaić played two games for his country at the 2002 FIFA World Cup and is most remembered for his spectacular goal against Italy, which secured a come-from-behind 2–1 victory.

Rapaić was also included in Croatia's squad at Euro 2004 and played in three matches at the finals. On 17 June 2004, he scored a goal in Croatia's 2–2 draw with reigning champions France in the group stage.

He proved to be a fan favourite with his fun-loving playing style wherever he has played, and after impressive performances, he once again earned a call-up in August 2006 for the Croatian national side after missing the 2006 FIFA World Cup. Croatia went on to beat the world champions Italy 2–0 in Livorno, with Rapaić starting.

His final international was a March 2007 European Championship qualification match against Macedonia.

== Personal life ==
Rapaić's son Boris is also a footballer.

== Career statistics ==
=== International ===
Goal	Date	Venue	Opponent	Score	Result	Competition
1	25 April 2001	Stadion Varteks, Varaždin	Greece	2–2	2–2	Friendly
2	8 May 2002	PMFC, Pécs	Hungary	1–0	2–0	Friendly
3	8 June 2002	Kashima, Kashima	Italy	2–1	2–1	2002 FIFA World Cup
4–5	2 April 2003	Stadion Varteks, Varaždin	Andorra	1–0	2–0	Euro 2004 Qualifying
4–5	2 April 2003	Stadion Varteks, Varaždin	Andorra	2 – 0	2–0	Euro 2004 Qualifying
6	17 June 2004	Dr. Magalhães Pessoa, Leiria	France	1–1	2–2	UEFA Euro 2004

== Honours ==
Hajduk Split

- Prva HNL: 1992, 1993–94, 1994–95
- Croatian Cup: 1992–93, 1994–95, 2002–03
- Croatian Super Cup: 1992, 1993, 1994

Fenerbahçe

- Süper Lig: 2000–01
