= Mirsad Hibić =

Bosnian footballer (born 1973)

Personal information
- Date of birth: 11 October 1973 (age 53)
- Place of birth: Zenica, SFR Yugoslavia
- Height: 1.86 m (6 ft 1 in)
- Position: Centre-back

Senior career*
Years	Team	Apps	(Gls)
1989–1991	Čelik Zenica	30	(0)
1992–1996	Hajduk Split	85	(8)
1996–2000	Sevilla	94	(3)
2000–2003	Atlético Madrid	91	(5)
Total		300	(16)

International career
1996–2004	Bosnia and Herzegovina	36	(0)
- * Club domestic league appearances and goals

Mirsad Hibić (born 11 October 1973) is a Bosnian former professional footballer who played as a centre-back.

== Club career ==
At club level, Hibić played for Čelik Zenica, Hajduk Split, Sevilla and Atlético Madrid, before retiring in January 2004.

== International career ==
Hibić made his debut for Bosnia and Herzegovina in an April 1996 friendly match against Albania and has earned a total of 36 caps, with fourteen of them as captain, but never scored. His final international was an April 2004 friendly against Finland.

== Personal life ==
Hibić resides in his hometown, Zenica, with his family.

== Honours ==
Hajduk Split

- Croatian First League: 1993–94, 1994–95
- Croatian Cup: 1992–93, 1994–95
- Croatian Super Cup: 1993, 1994

Atlético Madrid

- Segunda División: 2001–02
