= Goran Vlaović =

Croatian footballer

Personal information
- Date of birth: 7 August 1972 (age 54)
- Place of birth: Nova Gradiška, SFR Yugoslavia
- Height: 1.79 m (5 ft 10 in)
- Position: Striker

Senior career*
Years	Team	Apps	(Gls)
1990–1991	Osijek	24	(11)
1991–1994	Croatia Zagreb	80	(59)
1994–1996	Padova	50	(18)
1996–2000	Valencia	73	(17)
2000–2004	Panathinaikos	64	(29)
Total		291	(134)

International career
1993	Croatia U21	2	(0)
2001	Croatia B	1	(1)
1992–2002	Croatia	52	(15)
Medal record
Men's football
Representing Croatia
FIFA World Cup
Third place	1998 France
- * Club domestic league appearances and goals

Goran Vlaović (born 7 August 1972) is a Croatian retired footballer who played as a striker.

== Club career ==
Born in Nova Gradiška, Vlaović started his professional career with Osijek in 1989 and moved to HAŠK Građanski in 1992, before going abroad to play for Calcio Padova in Italy, Valencia in Spain and Panathinaikos in Greece, where he retired in June 2004. His biggest personal success at club level came when he topped the goalscoring charts of the 1993–94 Croatian First Football League, netting 29 goals for Dinamo Zagreb that season. The record remained unbroken for 13 years before Eduardo da Silva scored 34 goals for the same club in 2006–07. He remains the youngest player to have scored the most goals in a single season in Croatia. He also won the Copa del Rey and Supercopa de España with Valencia in 1999, as well as a Greek double with Panathinaikos in 2004.

== International career ==
Vlaović was a member of the Croatia national team for over ten years, between July 1992 and August 2002. He won a total of 52 international caps and scored 15 goals for the team (plus a single goal in his only appearance for Croatia B in a friendly against Romania in 2001).

Vlaović made his international debut for Croatia on 5 July 1992 in their friendly match against Australia in Melbourne, during the team's three-match tour through Australia. After the tour, Vlaović only made four international appearances in just over three and a half years, and having undergone surgery to remove a blood clot from his brain in 1995, he was only able to make one appearance in the UEFA Euro 1996 qualifying. However, he started to play regularly for Croatia in early 1996. On 13 March 1996, he scored his first goals for the team in a friendly match against Korea Republic, netting a flawless hat-trick in Croatia's 3–0 victory.

He was subsequently added to the Croatian squad for the UEFA Euro 1996 finals in England, appearing in all of the team's four matches before they were knocked out by eventual champions, Germany, in the quarter-finals. In Croatia's first match at the tournament, against Turkey, he came off the bench to replace Alen Bokšić in the final 20 minutes and scored the only goal of the match in the 86th minute, thus becoming the first goalscorer for Croatia in a major international tournament.

Two years later, Vlaović was a member of the Croatian squad that won the bronze medal at the 1998 FIFA World Cup finals in France, their first FIFA World Cup appearance. He appeared in all of Croatia's seven matches at the tournament, although only making one appearance over the entire 90 minutes in the semi-finals against France. In the 80th minute of the quarter-finals against highly favoured Germany, he scored the second goal in Croatia's 3–0 victory, which all but secured the team's place in the semi-finals.

After a year and a half of absence from the national team, Vlaović made his international comeback in January 2001, making an appearance for Croatia B in a friendly match against Romania, also scoring one goal in the match. He went on to make four appearances and score one goal in Croatia's qualifying campaign for the 2002 FIFA World Cup. He was also added to Croatia's 23-man squad for the finals of that tournament, but was left an unused substitute in all three group matches as the team failed to qualify for the knock-out stages. He won his last international cap in a friendly match against Wales on 21 August 2002.

== Career statistics ==
=== Club ===
Appearances and goals by club, season and competition
Club	Season	League			National cup		Continental		Other		Total	
Club	Season	Division	Apps	Goals	Apps	Goals	Apps	Goals	Apps	Goals	Apps	Goals
NK Osijek	1989–90	Yugoslav First League	1	0	0	0	–		–		1	0
NK Osijek	1990–91	Yugoslav First League	23	11	2	1	–		–		25	12
NK Osijek	Total		24	11	2	1	0	0	0	0	26	12
HAŠK Građanski	1992	Prva HNL	22	9	6	2	–		–		28	11
Croatia Zagreb	1992–93	Prva HNL	29	23	7	11	–		3 (Note: Appearances Croatian Super Cup)	2	39	36
Croatia Zagreb	1993–94	Prva HNL	30	29	11	7	4	6	–		45	42
Croatia Zagreb	1994–95	Prva HNL	–		–		–		2	0	2	0
Croatia Zagreb	Total	Prva HNL	59	52	18	18	4	6	5	2	86	78
Padova	1994–95	Serie A	27	5	0	0	–		–		27	5
Padova	1995–96	Serie A	23	13	1	0	–		–		24	13
Padova	Total		50	18	1	0	0	0	0	0	51	18
Valencia	1996–97	La Liga	24	8	0	0	7	2	–		31	10
Valencia	1997–98	La Liga	26	7	1	0	–		–		27	7
Valencia	1998–99	La Liga	20	2	3	1	0	0	–		23	3
Valencia	1999–00	La Liga	4	0	2	0	1	0	0 (Note: Supercopa de España)	0	7	0
Valencia	Total		74	17	6	1	8	2	0	0	88	20
Panathinaikos	2000–01	Alpha Ethniki	22	12	–		7	0	–		29	12
Panathinaikos	2001–02	Alpha Ethniki	21	13	–		13	2	–		34	15
Panathinaikos	2002–03	Alpha Ethniki	13	2	–		3	0	–		16	2
Panathinaikos	2003–04	Alpha Ethniki	13	2	–		4	0	–		17	2
Panathinaikos	Total		69	29	0	0	27	2	0	0	96	31
Career total			298	136	33	22	39	10	5	2	375	170

=== International ===
Appearances and goals by national team and year
National team	Year	Apps	Goals
Croatia	1992	3	0
Croatia	1993	0	0
Croatia	1994	1	0
Croatia	1995	1	0
Croatia	1996	12	8
Croatia	1997	8	2
Croatia	1998	10	2
Croatia	1999	6	1
Croatia	2000	0	0
Croatia	2001	8	2
Croatia	2002	3	0
Total		52	15

Scores and results list Croatia's goal tally first, score column indicates score after each Vlaović goal.

List of international goals scored by Goran Vlaović
No.	Date	Venue	Opponent	Score	Result	Competition
1	13 March 1996	Stadion Kranjčevićeva, Zagreb, Croatia	South Korea	1–0	3–0	Friendly
2	13 March 1996	Stadion Kranjčevićeva, Zagreb, Croatia	South Korea	2–0	3–0	Friendly
3	13 March 1996	Stadion Kranjčevićeva, Zagreb, Croatia	South Korea	3–0	3–0	Friendly
4	26 March 1996	Stadion Varteks, Varaždin, Croatia	Israel	2–0	2–0	Friendly
5	11 June 1996	City Ground, Nottingham, England	Turkey	1–0	1–0	UEFA Euro 1996
6	8 October 1996	Stadio Renato Dall'Ara, Bologna, Italy	Bosnia and Herzegovina	2–1	4–1	1998 FIFA World Cup qualification
7	11 December 1996	Stade Mohammed V, Casablanca, Morocco	Morocco	1–0	2–2	1996 King Hassan II Trophy
8	11 December 1996	Stade Mohammed V, Casablanca, Morocco	Morocco	2–0	2–2	1996 King Hassan II Trophy
9	8 June 1997	Olympic Stadium, Tokyo, Japan	Japan	3–4	3–4	1997 Kirin Cup
10	29 October 1997	Stadion Maksimir, Zagreb, Croatia	Ukraine	2–0	2–0	1998 FIFA World Cup qualification
11	29 May 1998	Stadion Aldo Drosina, Pula, Croatia	Slovakia	1–1	1–2	Friendly
12	4 July 1998	Stade de Gerland, Lyon, France	Germany	2–0	3–0	1998 FIFA World Cup
13	10 March 1999	Spyros Louis Stadium, Athens, Greence	Greece	1–2	2–3	Friendly
14	25 April 2001	Stadion Varteks, Varaždin, Croatia	Greece	1–2	2–2	Friendly
15	2 June 2001	Stadion Varteks, Varaždin, Croatia	San Marino	1–0	4–0	2002 FIFA World Cup qualification

== Honours ==
Dinamo Zagreb

- Croatian First League: 1992–93
- Croatian Football Cup: 1994

Valencia

- UEFA Intertoto Cup: 1998
- Copa del Rey: 1998–99
- Supercopa de España: 1999

Panathinaikos

- Alpha Ethniki: 2003–04
- Greek Football Cup: 2004

Croatia

- FIFA World Cup third place: 1998
- 1996 International Cup Tournament

Individual

- SN Yellow Shirt Award: 1993
- Croatian First League top scorer: 1993, 1994
- Croatian Cup top scorer: 1993
- Franjo Bučar State Award for Sport: 1998

Orders

- Order of Danica Hrvatska with face of Franjo Bučar - 1995
- Order of the Croatian Trefoil - 1998
