= Ardian Kozniku =

Croatian footballer (born 1967)

Personal information
- Date of birth: 27 October 1967 (age 58)
- Place of birth: Đakovica, SAP Kosovo, SR Serbia, SFR Yugoslavia
- Height: 1.82 m (6 ft 0 in)
- Position: Forward

Team information
- Current team: Al-Salmiya (assistant)

Youth career
- Gjakova
- –1988: Vëllaznimi

Senior career*
Years	Team	Apps	(Gls)
1988–1990	Priština	58	(17)
1990–1994	Hajduk Split	98	(44)
1994–1996	Cannes	55	(20)
1996–1997	Le Havre	30	(6)
1997–1998	APOEL	11	(12)
1998	Bastia	12	(5)
1998–2000	Croatia Zagreb	28	(5)
2000–2001	Kärnten	7	(0)
2001–2002	Hrvatski Dragovoljac	11	(2)
Total		310	(111)

International career
1993–2002	Kosovo	2	(0)
1994–1998	Croatia	7	(2)

Managerial career
- 2014–2015: Shkëndija
- 2016–2017: Vrapče (youth coach)
- 2017–2018: Rudeš U19
- 2018–2019: Croatia U19 (assistant)
- 2018–2020: Lokomotiva (youth coach)
- 2021–2022: Al-Arabi (assistant)
- 2022–2023: Al Faisaly (assistant)
- 2023: Al-Adalah (assistant)
- 2024–: Al-Salmiya (assistant)
Medal record
Representing Croatia
Bronze medal – third place	FIFA World Cup	1998
- * Club domestic league appearances and goals

Ardian Kozniku (Croatian: Ardijan Kozniku; 27 October 1967) is a Kosovan-Croatian professional football manager and former player who is the assistant manager of Kuwaiti club Al-Salmiya.

== Playing career ==
=== Club ===
He started his career at Vëllaznimi from Gjakova and was later picked up by Prishtina. He moved to Croatian side Hajduk Split in 1990 and played there until 1994, scoring 90 goals in 169 games in all competitions for them. He then went on to play for French clubs Cannes, Le Havre and Bastia, as well as Cypriot side APOEL, before making his comeback to Croatia in the summer of 1998, signing with Croatia Zagreb. After two and a half seasons at the club, he made a move to Austrian side Kärnten in the winter break of the 2000–01 season and left the club after only six months for Croatian side Hrvatski Dragovoljac, where he finished his career in 2002.

With Hajduk Split, he was the top goalscorer of the opening season of the Prva HNL in 1992, scoring 12 goals. He scored a total of 45 goals in the league.

=== International ===
He was an occasional member of the Croatia national team in the 1990s, making seven international caps and scoring two goals. He made his international debut in a friendly match against Slovakia in April 1994 and also made three appearances in Croatia's qualifying campaign for the UEFA Euro 1996, scoring one goal. He was a member of Croatia's bronze medal-winning squad at the 1998 FIFA World Cup, but was left an unused substitute in all of the team's seven matches at the tournament. His last match for Croatia was a friendly against Australia in early June 1998, during the team's preparations for the upcoming World Cup, where he also netted one goal in his team's 7–0 victory.

He also played for Kosovo in unofficial friendly matches against Albania on 14 February 1993 and again on 7 September 2002 against Albania.

== Managerial career ==
In September 2014 Kozniku became a coach of Shkëndija. In May 2021, he assisted Ante Miše to the Kuwaiti league title with Al-Arabi. He later assisted Miše at Saudi Arabian side Al Faisaly FC.

== Diving Federation ==
Kozniku has served two years as the president of the Croatian Diving Federation. His daughter Diana (born 1995), a diver, placed 11th in 1 m springboard at the 2010 European Aquatics Championships.

== International goals ==
Scores and results list Croatia's goal tally first, score column indicates score after each Kozniku goal.

List of international goals scored by Ardian Kozniku
No.	Date	Venue	Opponent	Score	Result	Competition
1	9 October 1994	Maksimir, Zagreb, Croatia	Lithuania	2–0	2–0	Euro 1996 Qualifying
2	6 June 1998	Maksimir, Zagreb, Croatia	Australia	6–0	7–0	Friendly

== Honours ==
Hajduk Split

- Croatian First League: 1992, 1993–94
- Croatian Cup: 1993
- Croatian Super Cup: 1992, 1993
- Yugoslav Cup: 1991

Cannes

- Coupe Gambardella: 1995

Croatia Zagreb

- Croatian First League: 1998–99, 1999–00

Kärnten

- Austrian Cup: 2000–01
- Austrian Super Cup: 2001

Orders

- Order of the Croatian Interlace - 1998

== Notes ==
a.	Albanian spelling: Ardian Kozniku, Serbian spelling: Ardijan Kozniku, Ардијан Кознику.
