= Nenad Pralija =

Croatian footballer (born 1970)

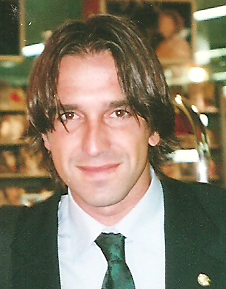

Personal information
- Date of birth: 11 December 1970 (age 55)
- Place of birth: Split, SFR Yugoslavia
- Height: 1.81 m (5 ft 11 in)
- Position: Midfielder

Senior career*
Years	Team	Apps	(Gls)
1990–1993	RNK Split		
1993–1996	Hajduk Split	70	(32)
1996–1998	Espanyol	42	(4)
1998–1999	Hajduk Split	16	(4)
1999–2000	Reggina	23	(0)
2000–2003	Maccabi Haifa	81	(21)
2003–2005	Hajduk Split	44	(3)
2005–2007	Trogir	17	(3)
Total		293	(67)

International career
1993	Croatia U21	1	(0)
1995–1997	Croatia	11	(1)
- * Club domestic league appearances and goals

Nenad Pralija (born 11 December 1970) is a Croatian former professional football midfielder, who most notably played for Hajduk Split and the Croatia national team.

== Club career ==
Pralija started his career at his hometown club RNK Split where he spent three years before moving to the local powerhouse Hajduk Split. In his first season at Hajduk, the club had a successful Champions League campaign and Pralija is still dearly remembered by Hajduk fans for his spectacular volley in the group stage game against Anderlecht which was unstoppable for the Belgian side's goalkeeper Filip De Wilde, even though Pralija played the whole game playing as a left back - a position he never played at before. His form kept improving in subsequent seasons, and he finished the 1995–96 season as the club's top scorer with 17 goals in 26 appearances. He instantly became Hajduk fans' favourite player and was bestowed the Heart of Hajduk Award for two consecutive years (1995 and 1996).

After three successful years at Hajduk, Pralija moved to La Liga club Espanyol where he started off as a first-team regular under José Antonio Camacho, but soon fell out of the manager's favour so he returned to Hajduk for the second half of the 1998–99 season. After that he spent a year at Serie A club Reggina, before moving to the Israeli outfit Maccabi Haifa. At Maccabi Pralija had a very successful spell, playing alongside fellow Croat Đovani Roso and coached by Avram Grant. During this time he won two Israeli championships and played in the Champions League again, this time scoring against Bayer Leverkusen at BayArena. He is still regarded as one of the best Maccabi players of the early 2000s.

After Maccabi, he returned to Hajduk again in 2003. At first he was a first-team regular and even captained the team for a while, but soon after Niko Kranjčar and Ivan Leko came to the club his increasingly poor performances pushed him out of the squad. During the 2005–06 season winter break he quietly left the club and moved to the lower level minnows NK Trogir where he ended his playing career and six months later took over as the club's sports director. He oversaw the club's promotion to Druga HNL but resigned soon afterwards.

== International career ==
Pralija debuted for Croatia on 11 June 1995 against Ukraine, coming on as a substitute for Aljoša Asanović. He played a total of 11 games for the national side (and scored a single goal in a friendly versus Czech Republic), but failed to leave a deeper mark during Miroslav Blažević's reign. He was quoted as saying that he was "born in a wrong era, since it was impossible to win a place on the team which had the likes of players such as Aljoša Asanović, Zvonimir Boban and Robert Prosinečki." His last appearance for Croatia was on 12 June 1997 in the starting lineup of a friendly against Turkey, and was substituted by Miljenko Mumlek just after the hour mark.

== Honours ==
Hajduk Split

- Croatian First League: 1993–94, 1994–95, 2003–04, 2004–05
- Croatian Cup: 1994–95
- Croatian Super Cup: 1993, 1994, 2004, 2005

Maccabi Haifa

- Israeli Premier League: 2000–01, 2001–02
- Toto Cup: 2002–03

Croatia

- Hassan II Trophy: 1996

Individual

- Heart of Hajduk Award: 1995, 1996
