= 1994–95 Croatian Football Cup =

Tournament details
- Country: Croatia
- Teams: 32

Final positions
- Champions: Hajduk Split (2nd title)
- Runners-up: Croatia Zagreb

Tournament statistics
- Top goal scorer: Tomislav Erceg (7)

The 1994–95 Croatian Football Cup was the fourth edition of Croatia's football knockout competition. Croatia Zagreb were the defending champions, and the cup was won by Hajduk Split.

== Calendar ==
Round	Main date	Number of fixtures	Clubs	New entries this round
First round	First legs 6 and 7 September 1994, Second legs 10 and 12 September 1994	32	32 → 16	None
Second round	First legs 25 and 26 October 1994, Second legs 29 and 30 November 1994	16	16 → 8	None
Quarter-finals	First legs 8 and 26 March 1995, Second legs 5 April 1995	8	8 → 4	None
Semi-finals	First legs 19 April 1995, Second legs 10 May 1995	4	4 → 2	None
Final	First leg 17 May 1995, Second leg 28 May 1995	2	2 → 1	None

== First round ==
Team 1	Agg.	Team 2	1st leg	2nd leg
Bedem Ivankovo	3–8	Croatia Zagreb	0–3	3–5
Gospić	1–10	Hajduk Split	1–5	0–5
Metalac Sisak	1–7	Inker Zaprešić	1–5	0–2
Valpovka	0–4	Rijeka	0–2	0–2
Karlovac	1–4	NK Zagreb	0–0	1–4
Mladost Cernik	2–6	Zadar	1–4	1–2
Slaven Belupo	1–4	Varteks	1–2	0–2
Jadran Poreč	1–7	Osijek	0–4	1–3
Špansko	1–1 (6–5 p)	Istra Pula	1–0	0–1
Radnik Velika Gorica	1–3	Cibalia	1–2	0–1
RNK Split	3–1	Bjelovar	2–0	1–1
Budućnost Hodošan	4–4 (a)	Croatia Đakovo	4–1	0–3
Mladost Zabok	0–15	Segesta	0–7	0–8
Primorac Stobreč	3–4	Šibenik	3–1	0–3
Pazinka	1–6	Belišće	1–1	0–5
Dubrava	0–8	Dubrovnik	0–2	0–6

== Second round ==
Team 1	Agg.	Team 2	1st leg	2nd leg
Belišće	3–5	Croatia Zagreb	2–1	1–4
Špansko	4–5	Hajduk Split	1–1	3–4
Cibalia	3–3 (5–3 p)	Inker Zaprešić	2–1	1–2
RNK Split	0–5	Rijeka	0–1	0–4
Croatia Đakovo	2–6	NK Zagreb	2–2	0–4
Segesta	2–0	Zadar	1–0	1–0
Šibenik	2–2 (1–3 p)	Varteks	2–0	0–2
Dubrovnik	3–5	Osijek	3–1	0–4

== Quarter-finals ==
Team 1	Agg.	Team 2	1st leg	2nd leg
Cibalia	0–1	Croatia Zagreb	0–0	0–1
Segesta	1–4	Hajduk Split	1–1	0–3
Osijek	1–1 (4–2 p)	Rijeka	1–0	0–1
Varteks	1–1 (a)	NK Zagreb	0–0	1–1

== Semi-finals ==
19 April 1995
17:00

Osijek	0–2	Croatia Zagreb
	Report	Soldo 29'; Cvitanović 89'

Stadion Gradski vrt, Osijek
Attendance: 18,000
Referee: Ante Kulušić (Šibenik)
10 May 1995
18:00

Croatia Zagreb	2–1	Osijek
Lesjak 12'; Cvitanović 56'	Report	Labak 87'

Stadion Maksimir, Zagreb
Attendance: 2,000
Referee: Edo Trivković (Split)

Croatia Zagreb won 4–1 on aggregate.

19 April 1995
15:30

Varteks	1–1	Hajduk Split
Krznar 62'	Report	Jozinović 70'

Stadion Varteks, Varaždin
Attendance: 9,000
Referee: Jadranko Grgona (Zagreb)
10 May 1995
17:00

Hajduk Split	4–0	Varteks
Erceg 8'; Asanović 10'; Pralija 25', 71'	Report

Stadion Poljud, Split
Attendance: 300
Referee: Željko Širić (Osijek)

Hajduk Split won 5–1 on aggregate.

== Final ==
=== First leg ===
17 May 1995
18:00

Hajduk Split	3–2	Croatia Zagreb
Erceg 40', 51'; Asanović 77'	Report	Pamić 46'; Jeličić 75'

Stadion Poljud, Split
Attendance: 15,000
Referee: Željko Širić (Osijek)

=== Second leg ===
28 May 1995
18:00

Croatia Zagreb	0–1	Hajduk Split
	Report	Asanović 45'

Stadion Maksimir, Zagreb
Attendance: 17,000
Referee: Ivan Vranaričić (Đakovo)

Hajduk Split won 4–2 on aggregate.

== See also ==
- 1994–95 Croatian First Football League
