= Dalibor Filipović =

Croatian footballer (born 1974)

Personal information
- Date of birth: 28 September 1974 (age 52)
- Place of birth: Split, SFR Yugoslavia
- Position: Forward

Team information
- Current team: Čaporice Trilj (manager)

Senior career*
| Years | Team | Apps | (Gls) |
| 1992–1993 | Split | | |
| 1993 | Hajduk Split | 5 | (0) |
| 1994 | Dubrovnik | 11 | (1) |
| 1994 | Hajduk Split | 4 | (0) |
| 1995 | Inker Zaprešić | 21 | (7) |
| 1996 | Neretva | 15 | (9) |
| 1996 | Hajduk Split | 2 | (0) |
| 1996–1997 | Šibenik | 23 | (5) |
| 1997 | Varteks | 9 | (0) |
| 1998–2002 | Maribor | 62 | (27) |
| 2002 | Šmartno | 1 | (0) |
| 2002–2003 | AEL Limassol | 12 | (2) |
| 2003–2004 | Šmartno | 27 | (8) |
| 2005 | DPMM | 3 | (2) |

Managerial career
- 2016–2017: Orkan
- 2017–2018: Uskok
- 2020–2021: Urania
- 2021–2022: OSK Otok
- 2022–2023: Sloga Mravince
- 2023–2025: Urania
- 2026–: Čaporice Trilj
- * Club domestic league appearances and goals

Dalibor Filipović (born 28 September 1974) is a Croatian former footballer and current manager who played as a forward for several Croatian and Slovenian football clubs and for DPMM FC of Brunei.

== Club career ==
He started playing senior football in 1992/93 season while he was loaned to RNK Split. That season, club failed to reach the promotion to First league.

He was appointed manager of Uskok Klis in 2017, but was sacked near the end of the season. He later took charge at NK OSK and became manager of Sloga Mravinče in November 2022.
