= Mario Osibov =

Croatian footballer (born 1973)

Marijo Osibov
Personal information
- Full name: Marijo Osibov
- Date of birth: 30 March 1973 (age 53)
- Place of birth: Split, SFR Yugoslavia
- Position: Defender

Senior career*
| Years | Team | Apps | (Gls) |
| 1990–1992 | Hajduk Split | 19 | (1) |
| 1992–1993 | Zadar | 28 | (5) |
| 1993–1994 | Hajduk Split | 19 | (1) |
| 1994–1996 | Inker | 51 | (2) |
| 1996–2003 | Zagreb | 137 | (5) |
| 2003–2004 | Hapoel Petah Tikva | 43 | (3) |
| 2004–2005 | Lučko | | |
- * Club domestic league appearances and goals

Marijo Osibov (born 30 March 1973 in Split) is a retired Croatian football player who played for Hajduk Split and other Croatian and foreign clubs.

== External sources ==
- Mario Osibov at WorldFootball.net
- Mario Osibov at Croatian Football Statistics (archived) (in Croatian)
