= Tomislav Erceg =

Croatian footballer (born 1971)

Personal information
- Date of birth: 22 October 1971 (age 55)
- Place of birth: Split, SFR Yugoslavia
- Height: 1.84 m (6 ft 0 in)
- Position: Forward

Senior career*
Years	Team	Apps	(Gls)
1990–1991	Šibenik	16	(3)
1991–1995	Hajduk Split	85	(43)
1995–1996	Lugano	18	(9)
1996	Grasshopper	9	(3)
1996–1997	MSV Duisburg	5	(0)
1997–1998	Hajduk Split	26	(17)
1998	Ancona	19	(3)
1998–1999	Perugia	4	(0)
1999–2000	Hajduk Split	12	(7)
2000	Levante	17	(0)
2000–2001	Kocaelispor	15	(10)
2001–2002	Hajduk Split	25	(12)
2002–2003	Sanfrecce Hiroshima	15	(3)
2003–2004	Hapoel Petah Tikva	29	(12)
2004–2005	Rijeka	32	(17)
2005–2006	SpVgg Greuther Fürth	9	(2)
2006	Hajduk Split	13	(1)
Total		348	(142)

International career
1997	Croatia	4	(1)
- * Club domestic league appearances and goals

Tomislav Erceg (born 22 October 1971) is a retired Croatian footballer who played as a forward. He made four appearances for the Croatia national team, scoring one goal.

== Club career ==
Erceg started his career at HNK Šibenik in 1990, moving to HNK Hajduk Split after his first season with the club. After three seasons in Split, he went abroad, going on to play in the national leagues of Switzerland, Germany, Italy, Spain, Turkey, Japan and Israel. He was top scorer of the Prva HNL when he played for NK Rijeka in the 2004–05 season, scoring 17 goals. He was Rijeka's first player to become the league goalscorer in Prva HNL

As of May 2010 and the conclusion of the 2009–10 Prva HNL season, Erceg is ranked fifth all-time top scorer in Prva HNL with 97 goals.

== International career ==
He made his debut for Croatia in a June 1997 Kirin Cup match against Japan, coming on as a 74th-minute substitute for Robert Prosinečki, and earned a total of 4 caps, scoring 1 goal in a friendly game against Turkey on 12 June 1997. His final international was a September 1997 1998 FIFA World Cup qualification World Cup qualification match away against Denmark.

== Career statistics ==
=== Club ===
Club performance			League		Cup		League Cup		Continental		Total	
Season	Club	League	Apps	Goals	Apps	Goals	Apps	Goals	Apps	Goals	Apps	Goals
Yugoslavia			League		Yugoslav Cup		League Cup		Europe		Total	
1990–91	Šibenik	Yugoslav Second League	16	3	-	-	–	–	-	-	16	3
Croatia			League		Croatian Cup		Super Cup		Europe		Total	
1992	Hajduk Split	Prva HNL	10	1	1	0	-		0	0	16	3
1992–93	Hajduk Split	Prva HNL	21	7	8	5	0	0	0	0	28	12
1993–94	Hajduk Split	Prva HNL	27	18	5	6	0	0	0	0	32	24
1994–95	Hajduk Split	Prva HNL	27	17	7	7	1	0	8	1	43	25
Switzerland			League		Swiss Cup		League Cup		Europe		Total	
1995–96	Lugano	Nationalliga A	18	9	1	0	-		4	6	23	15
1996–97	Grasshopper Zürich	Nationalliga A	9	3	0	0	-		-		9	3
Germany			League		DFB-Pokal		DFL-Supercup		Europe		Total	
1996–97	Duisburg	Bundesliga	5	0	1	0	-		-		9	3
Croatia			League		Croatian Cup		Super Cup		Europe		Total	
1996–97	Hajduk Split	Prva HNL	14	6	-		-		-		14	6
1997–98	Hajduk Split	Prva HNL	12	11	1	1	-		6	3	19	15
Italy			League		Coppa Italia		Supercoppa Italiana		Europe		Total	
1997–98	Ancona	Serie B	19	3	-		-		-		19	3
1998–99	Perugia	Serie A	4	0	1	0	-		-		19	3
Croatia			League		Croatian Cup		Super Cup		Europe		Total	
1998–99	Hajduk Split	Prva HNL	12	7	2	0	-		-		19	3
Spain			League		Copa del Rey		Supercopa de España		Europe		Total	
1999–00	Levante	Segunda División	17	0	0	0	-		-		17	0
Turkey			League		Turkish Cup		Süper Kupa		Europe		Total	
2000–01	Kocaelispor	First League	14	10	0	0	-		1	0	15	10
2001–02	Kocaelispor	Süper Lig	1	0	-		-		-		1	0
Croatia			League		Croatian Cup		Super Cup		Europe		Total	
2001-02	Hajduk Split	Prva HNL	21	13	4	2	-		2	0	27	15
2002-03	Hajduk Split	Prva HNL	5	0	-		-		2	3	7	3
Japan			League		Emperor's Cup		J.League Cup		Asia		Total	
2002	Sanfrecce Hiroshima	J1 League	10	1	3	0	0	0	-		13	1
2003	Sanfrecce Hiroshima	J2 League	5	2	0	0	-		-		5	2
Israel			League		Israel State Cup		Toto Cup		Europe		Total	
2003–04	Hapoel Petah Tikva	Premier League	29	12	1	0	4	1	-		34	13
Croatia			League		Croatian Cup		Super Cup		Europe		Total	
2004–05	Rijeka	Prva HNL	32	17	8	7	0	0	2	2	42	26
Germany			League		DFB-Pokal		DFL-Supercup		Europe		Total	
2005–06	Greuther Fürth	2. Bundesliga	9	2	1	0	-		-		10	2
Croatia			League		Croatian Cup		Super Cup		Europe		Total	
2005–06	Hajduk Split	Prva HNL	13	1	2	0	-		-		15	1
Country	Yugoslavia		16	3	0	0	0	0	0	0	16	3
Country	Croatia		194	97	38	28	1	0	20	9	253	134
Country	Switzerland		27	12	1	0	0	0	4	6	32	18
Country	Germany		14	2	2	0	0	0	0	0	16	2
Country	Italy		23	3	1	0	0	0	0	0	24	3
Country	Spain		17	0	0	0	0	0	0	0	17	0
Country	Turkey		15	10	0	0	0	0	1	0	16	10
Country	Japan		15	3	3	0	0	0	-		18	3
Country	Israel		29	12	1	0	4	1	0	0	34	13
Total			350	143	43	28	5	1	25	15	423	187

=== International ===
Croatia
Year	Apps	Goals
1997	4	1
Total	4	1

=== International goals ===
Goal	Date	Venue	Opponent	Score	Result	Competition
1	12 June 1997	Yurtec Stadium, Sendai	Japan	0 – 1	1 – 1	Kirin Cup

== Honours ==
Hajduk Split

- Croatian First League: 1992, 1993–94, 1994–95
- Croatian Cup: 1993, 1995
- Croatian Super Cup: 1992, 1993, 1994, 2003

Rijeka

- Croatian Cup: 2005

=== Individual ===
- Croatian Cup top scorer: 1994–95, 2004–05
- Prva HNL Player of the Year (Tportal): 2004
- Croatian First League top scorer: 2004–05
- Fifth all-time top goalscorer of Croatian First League
