= Aljoša Asanović =

Croatian footballer (born 1965)

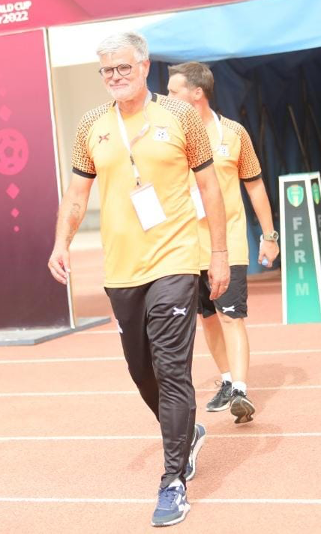
- Asanović with Zambia in 2021

Personal information
- Date of birth: 14 December 1965 (age 60)
- Place of birth: Split, SR Croatia, Yugoslavia
- Height: 1.85 m (6 ft 1 in)
- Position: Midfielder

Youth career
- –1984: Hajduk Split

Senior career*
Years	Team	Apps	(Gls)
1984	Split		
1984–1990	Hajduk Split	139	(36)
1990–1991	Metz	35	(13)
1991–1992	Cannes	28	(7)
1992–1994	Montpellier	43	(10)
1994–1996	Hajduk Split	33	(8)
1995–1996	→ Valladolid (loan)	8	(1)
1996–1997	Derby County	38	(5)
1997–1998	Napoli	15	(0)
1998–2000	Panathinaikos	44	(9)
2000–2001	Austria Wien	0	(0)
2001	Sydney United	4	(1)
2001–2002	Toronto Croatia		
2002	Hajduk Split	1	(0)
Total		388	(90)

International career
1987–1988	Yugoslavia	3	(0)
1990–2000	Croatia	62	(3)

Managerial career
- 2006–2012: Croatia (assistant)
- 2012–2013: Lokomotiv Moscow (assistant)
- 2015–2017: Dunajská Streda (technical director)
- 2017–2018: Melbourne Knights
- 2018–2019: Al-Ittihad (assistant)
- 2019–2021: Croatia (diaspora instructor)
- 2021–2022: Zambia (technical director)
- 2022: Zambia
Medal record
Representing Croatia
Bronze medal – third place	FIFA World Cup	1998
- * Club domestic league appearances and goals

Aljoša Asanović (born 14 December 1965) is a Croatian football coach and former player who played as a midfielder. He was regarded as one of the best players in the Yugoslav First League, emerging as one of five top scorers during the 1989–90 season with 14 goals.

Asanović is best known for his great performance in the mid-to-late 1990s when he played for Derby County and for Croatia during Euro 96 as well as the 1998 FIFA World Cup. He scored the first goal in Croatia's team modern history. He was the coach for the Zambia national team for a short period of time in 2022.

== Club career ==
=== Early career ===
Born in Split, SR Croatia, SFR Yugoslavia, Asanović started his professional career with Hajduk Split in 1984. In the 1989 to 1990 season, Asanović emerged as the best player of the Yugoslavia football league. This was first of the three spells he had with Hajduk, as he came back to play for the club in 1994 and 2001 respectively. In his first spell with Hajduk, he played until the 1990, when he was signed by the French club Metz.

=== French clubs ===
Asanović spent one season with Metz, during which he made total of 35 appearances and scored 13 goals.

In the summer of 1991, he moved to another French club, Cannes, where he also spent only one season.

At the beginning of the 1992/93 season, he was signed by his third club in France: Montpellier. He appeared in total of 43 matches and scored ten goals in the process. He stayed with the club for two seasons, until the summer of 1994.

=== Hajduk Split ===
After four seasons in France, Asanović was summoned by his native club Hajduk Split in 1994. The club signed Asanović and several other important players such as Igor Štimac, Tonči Gabrić and Barcelona youngster Goran Vučević, as they were eager to qualify for 1994–95 UEFA Champions League for the first time since Croatian independence. Asanović scored two goals in second leg of qualifier against Legia Warsaw and Hajduk Split qualified for 1994–95 UEFA Champions League. Asanović added another goal in the group stage match against Steaua București. Hajduk went on to reach the quarter-finals of 1994–95 UEFA Champions League, where they were eliminated by eventual champions Ajax. During 1994–95 season with Hajduk, Asanović won Croatian league and Cup, appearing in 33 domestic league matches and scoring 8 goals.

In the summer of 1995, he was loaned to Spanish La Liga team Real Valladolid.

=== Derby County ===
In July 1996, Asanović was signed by Premier League club Derby County, where he played alongside his former Hajduk teammate Igor Štimac. He spent one and a half seasons with Derby County and appeared in 38 domestic league matches.

At the start of the 1997–98 season, with the 1998 FIFA World Cup looming in the summer, he was not a regular in the Derby side and decided to leave the club in December 1997 in order to find his form for the summer tournament in France.

=== Napoli ===
In the winter of 1997, Asanović changed clubs again. After playing for several clubs in Croatia, France, Spain and England, he moved to his fifth different professional football league. This time he moved to Italy, as he signed with Napoli. He established himself in the team quickly and managed to make appearance in 15 Serie A games during his six month spell with the club, but failed to score a single goal.

=== Panathinaikos ===
After some impressive performances at 1998 FIFA World Cup, Asanović signed with Panathinaikos in Greece. In two seasons with Panathinaikos, he appeared in 44 league matches, scoring nine goals.

=== Later career ===
In 2000, Asanović moved to Austria Wien. In 2001, he moved to Australia to sign with National Soccer League side Sydney United, a side formed and backed by Croatians in Australia. After a short spell in Australia, he played in the Canadian Professional Soccer League with Toronto Croatia, and then he returned to his hometown club Hajduk Split to finish his career.

== International career ==
Asanović was one of the best players for the Croatia national team during their golden age from 1994 to 1998. He was arguably Croatia's most intelligent player in midfield, yet lacked the complete package of skills possessed by his fellow midfielder Robert Prosinečki. He debuted for the national on 17 October 1990, which ended in a 2–1 victory against the United States. This was Croatia's first international game since the independence from Yugoslavia, and Asanović even scored the first goal.

Asanović participated in the Euro 1996 as well as the 1998 FIFA World Cup, in which Croatia won the bronze medal. In semi-final of the FIFA World Cup, Asanović made a spectacular assist to Davor Šuker from the centre of the field with a loop pass, for Croatia to take the lead against the host France.

His last international match was a 28 May 2000 friendly against France. In total he was capped 62 times, scoring 3 goals, thus ranking among the top five Croatian national players. Asanović ended his active career in 2002 while with Hajduk Split, the club in which his career had started almost twenty years earlier.

== Managerial career ==
In 2006, he became assistant manager of the Croatia national team. He held this role from 2006 until 2012, working alongside Slaven Bilić, who was the head coach. He departed when Bilić was replaced by Igor Štimac.

After his departure from the national team, Asanović took up another assistant role, this time in Russia, following Slaven Bilić to Lokomotiv Moscow. Asanović departed the club at the end of the season.

In 2015, Asanović became the new technical director of Dunajská Streda.

In October 2017, Asanović took up a job in Australia, becoming the head coach of National Premier Leagues Victoria side Melbourne Knights.

In October 2018, Asanović took up an assistant coach role with a Saudi Arabian premier league side Al-Ittihad until 2019.

Asanović was the Director and Diaspora instructor for the Croatian Football Federation from 2019 to June 2021 before being appointed Technical Director for the Zambia national team, a role he held till December 2021.

He was appointed as head coach of the Zambian national team in January 2022. He left in September over alleged non-payment of wages.

== Personal life ==
Asanović's son Antonio, who was born in France while he was playing for Cannes, is also a footballer.

== Career statistics ==
Goal	Date	Venue	Opponent	Score	Result	Competition
1	17 October 1990	Maksimir, Zagreb	United States	1 – 0	2 – 1	Friendly
2–3	8 June 1997	Olympic, Tokyo	Japan	1 – 3	3 – 4	Friendly
2–3	8 June 1997	Olympic, Tokyo	Japan	2 – 3	3 – 4	Friendly

== Managerial statistics ==
As of 23 September 2022

Team	From	To	Record							
Team	From	To	G	W	D	L	GF	GA	GD	Win %
Melbourne Knights	2017	2018					—			
Zambia	2022	2022	11	4	2	5	14	16	−2	36.36

Note: win or lose by penalty shoot-out is counted as the draw in time.

== Honours ==
=== Player ===
Hajduk Split

- Croatian First League: 1994–95
- Croatian Cup: 1995
- Croatian Super Cup: 1994
- Yugoslav Cup: 1987, 1991

Montpellier

- Coupe de la Ligue: 1992

Croatia

- FIFA World Cup third place: 1998

Individual

- Franjo Bučar State Award for Sport: 1998

=== Manager ===
Zambia

- 2022 COSAFA Cup

=== Orders ===
- Order of Danica Hrvatska with face of Franjo Bučar: 1995
- Order of the Croatian Trefoil: 1998
