= Darko Jozinović =

Croatian footballer and manager

Personal information
- Full name: Darko Jozinović
- Date of birth: 15 August 1970 (age 56)
- Place of birth: Osijek, SFR Yugoslavia
- Height: 1.85 m (6 ft 1 in)
- Position: Midfielder

Senior career*
Years	Team	Apps	(Gls)
1988–1994	Cibalia	137	(8)
1995–1998	Hajduk Split	77	(5)
1998–2000	Karlsruher SC	35	(2)
2000–2002	Hrvatski Dragovoljac	4	(0)
2002–2004	Cibalia	37	(0)
2004–2005	Samobor		
2006–2007	Vinogradar		
2007	Radnik Velika Gorica	12	(2)
2008	HAŠK	28	(4)
2009	Lučko	13	(0)
2009–2010	Radnik Sesvete	10	(0)

Managerial career
- 2018: Rudeš
- 2021-2022: Cibalia
- * Club domestic league appearances and goals as of 30 December 2008

Darko Jozinović (born 15 August 1970) is a retired Croatian footballer and most recently manager of HNK Cibalia.
