= NK Primorac 1929 =

Croatian football club

Primorac
- Full name: Nogometni Klub Primorac 1929
- Founded: 1929
- Ground: Igralište Blato
- Capacity: 1,000
- Chairman: Ivan Rajić
- Manager: Darko Dražić
- League: Treća HNL South
- 2017–18: Treća HNL South, 7th
Home colours	Away colours

Nogometni Klub Primorac 1929 (English: Football Club Primorac 1929), commonly referred to as Primorac Stobreč, is a Croatian football club based in the small coastal town of Stobreč near the city of Split in central Dalmatia. They are members of the 3. HNL South, one of five third level divisions in the Croatian football league system. Primorac 1929 acted as a farm team for the nearby powerhouse Hajduk Split from 2011 to 2014.

== History ==
Founded as "NK Primorac" in 1929, the club was unregistered until 1950. In 1952 it entered the lower tiers of the Yugoslav league system in the Split regional league. The club spent its entire competitive history in lower tiers until Croatia's independence in 1991, before achieving their greatest success by winning promotion to 1. HNL, Croatian top level, at the end of the 1992–93 season.

Primorac then spent 1993–94 and 1994–95 in top level, finishing both seasons in 14th place and eventually getting relegated in 1995 to 1. HNL-B. The club's fortunes then rapidly declined and after spending three seasons in second level they slipped down to third level in 1998 in which they competed until 2002, even winning the 3. HNL South Division in the 2001–02 season.

However, the club went bankrupt at the end of season but was immediately re-established as "Primorac 1929" and began playing in county levels (Croatian 4th tier). Among notable players who had spells with the club are Croatian internationals Slaven Bilić, Tomislav Erceg and Mario Bazina, Slovenian international Boško Boškovič and Croatian-born Singaporean international Mirko Grabovac.

In 2011 the club signed a six-year cooperation agreement with the local powerhouse Hajduk Split. Hajduk agreed to finance the development of Primorac's facilities and grounds in Stobreč in exchange for Primorac providing playing experience for young players who are products of Hajduk Academy, effectively transforming it into Hajduk's farm team. The agreement with Hajduk was terminated in 2014.

== Honours ==
- Third Croatian League – Division South (1): 2001–02
