= Stipe Balajić =

Croatian footballer (born 1968)

Personal information
- Date of birth: 27 September 1968 (age 58)
- Place of birth: Sinj, SFR Yugoslavia
- Height: 1.88 m (6 ft 2 in)
- Positions: Defender; midfielder

Senior career*
Years	Team	Apps	(Gls)
- Junak Sinj
1992	Zadar	21	(1)
1992–1994	Hajduk Split	44	(6)
1995	Zadar	13	(3)
1995–1996	Istra	45	(3)
1997	Šibenik	13	(2)
1998–2005	Maribor	176	(29)
Total		313	(43)

Managerial career
- 2008–2010: Solin
- 2010–2011: RNK Split (assistant)
- 2012–2013: Dugopolje
- 2013–2014: Hajduk Split (U-19)
- 2014: Dugopolje
- 2015–2016: Imotski
- 2016–2017: Šibenik
- 2017: Krško
- 2019–2020: Dugopolje
- 2020–2021: Junak Sinj
- 2021–2022: Posušje
- * Club domestic league appearances and goals

Stipe Balajić (born 27 September 1968) is a Croatian professional football manager and former player.

== Club career ==
Balajić began his career in NK Junak Sinj. In 1992, he played for NK Zadar where he played in the Croatian first division, Prva HNL. During the next season he signed for HNK Hajduk Split where he played until 1994 when he returned to Zadar where he stayed for couple of months. His next stop in his career was NK Istra where he played for a season and a half until he joined HNK Šibenik in 1997. In total Balajić earned 136 appearances in the Croatian first division, scoring 15 goals in the process.

After time spent in Prva HNL he joined his first and only club abroad, the Slovenian side NK Maribor, where he had his best years. He played in Maribor for eight seasons up until his retirement in 2005. In 2002, he almost left the club but then returned after two months to help the team that already had financial difficulties at that time. According to his wishes he has played the first part of the season without payment from the club. In his last couple of seasons he was also the team captain.

He had his best moments in Maribor during the 1999–2000 season, when he led the team through qualifications for the elite UEFA Champions League where the team eventually qualified and played in. Balajić scored an important goal in the second leg of the third qualifying round against Olympique Lyonnais, which was won by Maribor 3–0 on aggregate. He then played for the team in group stages and scored one of two Maribor goals in the process, against FC Dynamo Kyiv. Maribor obtained four points and finished last in Group A.

Balajić finished his career as a player in 2005 when he has played his last match for Maribor in a friendly against Hajduk Split. He played his last match for the first 19 minutes of the match and was then substituted. In his honour the club has retired the jersey with the number 19, the only number to be retired in history of the club. He has earned a total of 176 appearances for Maribor in the Slovenian PrvaLiga, where he scored 29 goals in the process. Overall, Balajić played a total of 230 official matches and scored 37 goals for Maribor in all competitions.

== Managerial career ==
After his football career, Balajić turned into managing. He started his managerial career as an assistant manager. His first job as manager started in 2007 when he accepted the offer from 3. HNL team NK Zagora Unešić. After finishing the season in second place, Balajić took the job as manager of 2. HNL team NK Solin, where he stayed until 2010. In June 2010, Balajić became the assistant manager at RNK Split.

In 2013, he became manager of the HNK Hajduk Split under-19 squad. He was sacked from the job in 2014. After one year at Hajduk Split, Balajić became the manager of NK Dugopolje once again on 8 August 2014 but only one month later, he resigned.

In January 2019, Balajić was appointed as the manager of Dugopolje for the third time.
