= Igor Cvitanović =

Croatian footballer (born 1970)

Personal information
- Date of birth: 1 November 1970 (age 55)
- Place of birth: Osijek, SR Croatia, Yugoslavia
- Height: 1.86 m (6 ft 1 in)
- Position: Forward

Senior career*
Years	Team	Apps	(Gls)
1989–1997	Croatia Zagreb	181	(117)
1992	→ Varteks (loan)	21	(9)
1998–1999	Real Sociedad	29	(3)
1999–2002	Dinamo Zagreb	40	(18)
2002	Shimizu S-Pulse	5	(1)
2002–2004	Osijek	5	(0)
Total		281	(148)

International career
1993	Croatia U21	1	(0)
1992–1999	Croatia	27	(4)

Managerial career
- 2013–2016: Dinamo Zagreb (assistant)
- 2018–2019: Dubrava
- 2019: Istra 1961
- 2021: Dinamo Zagreb II
- * Club domestic league appearances and goals

Igor Cvitanović (pronounced [îgor tsʋitǎːnoʋitɕ, - tsʋǐta-]; born 1 November 1970) is a Croatian former professional footballer who played as a striker.

He is currently the 2nd all-time goalscorer of the Croatian First League (behind Davor Vugrinec) with a total of 126 goals, and also scored 122 domestic league goals for Croatian club Dinamo Zagreb, 117 of which were in the Croatian First League. He also played for the Croatia national team.

== Club career ==
Born in Osijek, Cvitanović started his professional career at Dinamo Zagreb in 1989, appearing in 10 Yugoslav First League matches and scoring five goals for the club in the league during his first professional season. He was subsequently loaned to NK Varteks during the inaugural season of the Croatian First League in the spring of 1992, making 21 appearances and scoring nine goals in the league before returning to Dinamo Zagreb the following summer.

Between 1992 and 1997, Cvitanović spent five and a half seasons playing for Dinamo Zagreb and became the top goalscorer of the Croatian First League in two consecutive seasons, scoring 19 goals in 1995-96 and 20 goals in 1996-97.

In 1995, he had agreed terms with Middlesbrough in the Premier League, but the £1million transfer fell through on 2 December 1995 after the Department of Employment refuse to issue him with a work permit.

He also scored 27 league goals in the 1993-94 season, but was at the time overtaken in the goalscoring charts by his then teammate Goran Vlaović, who scored 29 league goals that season. Cvitanović also scored nine goals in 14 league matches in the autumn of 1997, before moving abroad to Spanish side Real Sociedad at the beginning of the year 1998. He scored a total of 104 goals in domestic league competitions for Dinamo Zagreb before leaving the club, becoming their most successful goalscorer of all time.

He failed to find much success with the Spanish side, scoring only three goals in 29 La Liga appearances before returning to Dinamo Zagreb in 1999. In 2002, he left Dinamo Zagreb to spend a season with Japanese side Shimizu S-Pulse and then returned to Croatia to spend one more season with Osijek in 2003-04, before retiring from playing.

== International career ==
Cvitanović made his international debut for the Croatia national team on 22 October 1992 in a friendly match against Mexico in Zagreb. On 17 August 1994, he netted a brace for Croatia in a friendly match against Israel in Tel Aviv to score his first international goals. Cvitanović was also part of the Croatian squad at the UEFA Euro 1996 finals in England, where he did not play any matches. In the qualifying stages for the tournament, he only made one appearance as a stoppage-time substitute.

He went on to make six appearances in Croatia's qualifying campaign for the 1998 FIFA World Cup, but was dismissed from the team's training camp a few weeks before the beginning of the finals due to differences of opinion between him and coach Miroslav Blažević. He briefly returned to the team in the spring of 1999, making a further six appearances in friendlies, with his last international match being against Korea Republic on 19 June 1999 at the Korea Cup in Seoul. He scored his last international goal in Croatia's first match at the same tournament, against Egypt on 13 June 1999. He finished his international career with 27 caps and four goals.

== Managerial career ==
Cvitanović was appointed assistant to manager Branko Ivanković at Dinamo Zagreb in 2013. He was confirmed as manager of Istra 1961 in March 2019, suddenly leaving Dubrava for the club in Pula. He returned to Dinamo in April 2021, taking charge of the reserves, succeeding Ivan Prelec.

== Career statistics ==
Croatia national team
Year	Apps	Goals
1992	1	0
1993	0	0
1994	5	2
1995	0	0
1996	7	1
1997	7	0
1998	1	0
1999	6	1
Total	27	4

Goal	Date	Venue	Opponent	Score	Result	Competition
1–2	17 August 1994	Ramat Gan, Ramat Gan	Israel	1 – 0	4 – 0	Friendly
1–2	17 August 1994	Ramat Gan, Ramat Gan	Israel	2 – 0	4 – 0	Friendly
3	28 February 1996	Kantrida, Rijeka	Poland	2 – 1	2 – 1	Friendly
4	13 June 1999	Dongdaemun, Seoul	Egypt	1 – 2	2 – 2	Friendly

== Managerial statistics ==
As of match played 12 December 2021

Managerial record by team and tenure
Team	From	To	Record							
Team	From	To	G	W	D	L	GF	GA	GD	Win %
Istra 1961	04 March 2019	01 June 2019	15	3	3	9	6	13	−7	20.00
Dinamo Zagreb II	01 April 2021	31 December 2021	25	10	9	6	33	27	+6	40.00
Total			40	13	12	15	39	40	−1	32.50

== Honours ==
Club

- Prva HNL (4): 1992–93, 1995–96, 1996–97, 1999–2000
- Croatian Cup (3): 1994, 1996, 1997

Individual

- Prva HNL top scorer (2): 1995–96 (19), 1996–97 (20)
- SD Prva HNL Player of the Year (3): 1992, 1996, 1997
- SN Yellow Shirt Award (2): 1996, 1997
