= NK Istra =

Croatian football club

Istra
- Full name: Nogometni Klub Istra
- Nickname: Zeleno-žuti (The Green-Yellows)
- Founded: 1961; 65 years ago
- Ground: Stadion Aldo Drosina; Veruda (until 2011)
- Capacity: 3,500
- League: First Istria County League
Home colours	Away colours

Nogometni Klub Istra (English: Istra Football Club), commonly referred to as NK Istra or simply Istra, is a Croatian football club based in the city of Pula. The club currently plays in the fifth level of the Croatian league system, but Istra has also played in the Prva HNL (1991–1997 and 1999–2000). Istra was founded in 1961 from a merger of NK Pula and NK Uljanik.

== Honours ==
- (Croatia) Treća HNL – West
  - Winners (1): 2004–05

== Recent seasons ==
Season	League									Cup
Season	Division	P	W	D	L	F	A	Pts	Pos	Cup
1992	1. HNL	22	8	5	9	22	27	21	7th	
1992–93	1. HNL	30	12	4	14	32	35	28	8th	R2
1993–94	1. HNL	34	13	8	13	40	36	34	10th	R2
1994–95	1. HNL	30	8	8	14	30	46	32	12th	R1
1995–96	1. A HNL	36	10	10	16	33	53	42	11th	R1
1996–97	1. A HNL	30	6	7	17	25	54	25	15th ↓	R1
1997–98	2. HNL West	30	22	3	5	83	30	69	2nd	
1998–99	2. HNL	36	21	9	6	71	27	72	2nd ↑	R1
1999–2000	1. HNL	33	8	6	19	33	61	30	11th ↓	
2000–01	2. HNL	34	10	11	13	44	44	41	14th	
2001–02	2. HNL South	30	17	8	5	46	21	59	1st	
2002–03	2. HNL South	32	10	5	17	35	48	35	11th ↓	R1
2003–04	3. HNL West	30	18	6	6	74	37	60	2nd	
2004–05	3. HNL West	30	17	10	3	58	27	61	1st	
2005–06	3. HNL West	30	16	7	7	55	30	55	3rd	PR
2006–07	3. HNL West	34	14	7	13	47	47	49	8th	
2007–08	3. HNL West	34	7	10	17	25	50	31	16th	PR
2008–09	3. HNL West	34	10	7	17	36	67	35	17th	
2009–10	3. HNL West	34	1	5	28	22	79	8	18th ↓	
2010–11	4. HNL West	28	5	3	20	30	65	18	14th	
2011–12	4. HNL West	28	8	4	16	36	56	28	13th ↓	
2012–13	2nd Istria County League South Group	22	17	4	1	84	18	55	1st ↑	
2013–14	1st Istria County League (IV)	26	11	6	9	47	36	39	6th	
2014–15	1st Istria County League (V)	24	7	6	11	42	44	27	10th	
2015–16	1st Istria County League (V)	24	9	3	12	43	45	30	9th	
2016–17	1st Istria County League (V)	24	6	5	13	30	46	23	8th	
2017–18	1st Istria County League (V)	22	7	4	11	38	36	25	9th	
2018–19	1st Istria County League (V)	22	5	2	15	26	57	17	12th	
2019–20	2nd Istria County League (VI)	14	7	4	3	31	16	25	3rd ↑	
2020–21	1st Istria County League (V)	26	8	8	10	37	38	32	9th	
2021–22	1st Istria County League (V)	26	12	2	12	45	47	38	7th	
2022–23	1st Istria County League (V)	24	8	2	14	27	54	26	9th	
2023–24	1st Istria County League (V)	26	12	6	8	32	34	40 (-2)	7th	
2024–25	1st Istria County League (V)	27	10	3	14	36	45	33	8th	
2025–26	1st Istria County League (V)	27	7	6	14	32	43	27	9th	
