= Robert Vladislavić =

Croatian footballer

Personal information
- Full name: Robert Vladislavić
- Date of birth: 12 August 1968 (age 58)
- Place of birth: SFR Yugoslavia
- Position: Defender

Senior career*
Years	Team	Apps	(Gls)
1986–1995	Hajduk Split	71	(2)
1996	Rijeka	9	(0)
- * Club domestic league appearances and goals as of 30 December 2008

Robert Vladislavić (born 12 August 1968) is a retired Croatian football defender who played for Hajduk Split and HNK Rijeka.

Vladislavić was lightning fast and is an uncle of Frane Vladislavić.
