= 1994–95 Croatian First Football League =

1. HNL
- Season: 1994–95
- Dates: 14 August 1994 – 4 June 1995
- Champions: Hajduk Split; 3rd Croatian title 12th domestic title
- Relegated: Zadar (13th); Primorac (14th); Neretva (15th); Belišće (16th)
- Champions League: Hajduk Split
- UEFA Cup: Osijek
- Intertoto Cup: NK Zagreb
- Matches: 240
- Goals: 605 (2.52 per match)
- Top goalscorer: Robert Špehar (23)
- Biggest home win: Hajduk Split 7–1 Neretva; Istra 6–0 Belišće; Croatia Zagreb 6–0 Primorac
- Biggest away win: Belišće 2–7 Osijek
- Highest scoring: Belišće 2–7 Osijek
- Average attendance: 3,664

The 1994–95 Croatian First Football League, also known as 1. HNL, was the fourth season of the top-level league in Croatia since its establishment in 1992. This was the first season where three points were awarded for a win.

== Promoted teams ==
Neretva were promoted as winners of the Druga HNL (South) division and Marsonia were promoted as the winners of the Druga HNL (North) division. The league was therefore reduced to 16 teams, since four clubs were relegated in the previous season.

=== Stadia and personnel ===
Team	Manager^{1}	Location	Stadium	Capacity
Belišće	(Croatia) Stjepan Čordaš	Belišće	Gradski stadion Belišće	3,000
Cibalia	(Croatia) Tomislav Radić	Vinkovci	Stadion Cibalia	10,000
Croatia Zagreb	(Croatia) Zlatko Kranjčar	Zagreb	Stadion Maksimir	37,168
Hajduk Split	(Croatia) Ivan Katalinić	Split	Stadion Poljud	35,000
Inker Zaprešić	(Croatia) Ante Čačić	Zaprešić	Stadion Inkera	5,528
Istra Pula	(Croatia) Srećko Juričić	Pula	Stadion Veruda	2,500
Marsonia	(Croatia) Dragutin Krizmanić	Slavonski Brod	Stadion Stanko Vlajnić-Dida	
Neretva	(Croatia) Stjepan Ilić	Metković	Igralište iza Vage	3,000
Osijek	(Croatia) Ivo Šušak	Osijek	Stadion Gradski vrt	19,500
Primorac	(Croatia) Zdravko Marić	Stobreč	Igralište Blato	1,000
Rijeka	(Croatia) Josip Skoblar	Rijeka	Stadion Kantrida	10,275
Segesta	(Croatia) Milivoj Bračun	Sisak	Gradski stadion Sisak	8,000
Šibenik	(Croatia) Željko Maretić	Šibenik	Stadion Šubićevac	8,000
Varteks	(Croatia) Branko Ivanković	Varaždin	Stadion Varteks	10,800
Zadar	(Croatia) Josip Bajlo	Zadar	Stadion Stanovi	5,860
NK Zagreb	(Croatia) Ilija Lončarević	Zagreb	Stadion Kranjčevićeva	8,850

- ^{1} On final match day of the season, played on 4 June 1995.

== League table ==
Pos	Team	Pld	W	D	L	GF	GA	GD	Pts	Qualification or relegation
1	Hajduk Split (C)	30	19	8	3	68	26	+42	65	Qualification to Champions League qualifying round
2	Croatia Zagreb	30	19	7	4	53	26	+27	64	Banned from European competitions (Note: Croatia Zagreb were banned from European competitions for 1 year after their fans rioted and injured several policemen during the 1994–95 Cup Winners' Cup game against Auxerre)
3	Osijek	30	16	11	3	65	30	+35	59	Qualification to UEFA Cup preliminary round
4	NK Zagreb	30	14	11	5	41	26	+15	53	Qualification to Intertoto Cup group stage
5	Marsonia	30	13	8	9	42	32	+10	47	
6	Varteks	30	11	10	9	35	27	+8	43	
7	Inker Zaprešić	30	11	6	13	41	41	0	39	
8	Segesta	30	10	8	12	32	31	+1	38	
9	Šibenik	30	9	10	11	44	46	−2	37	
10	Cibalia	30	9	10	11	26	33	−7	37	
11	Rijeka	30	8	10	12	22	32	−10	34	
12	Istra Pula	30	8	8	14	30	46	−16	32	
13	Zadar (R)	30	7	10	13	33	47	−14	31	Relegation to Prva B HNL
14	Primorac (R)	30	7	10	13	27	49	−22	31	Relegation to Prva B HNL
15	Neretva (R)	30	4	11	15	20	44	−24	23	Relegation to Prva B HNL
16	Belišće (R)	30	4	4	22	26	69	−43	16	Relegation to Prva B HNL

Source: RSSSF.org
Rules for classification: 1st points; 2nd head-to-head points.
(C) Champions; (R) Relegated

== Results ==
Home \ Away	BEL	CIB	CZG	HAJ	INK	IST	MAR	NER	OSI	PRI	RIJ	SEG	ŠIB	VAR	ZAD	ZAG
Belišće		0–2	0–1	1–1	1–0	4–0	1–1	0–0	2–7	0–1	1–2	0–0	0–3	1–3	1–0	0–1
Cibalia	1–0		1–0	1–1	1–0	0–0	1–2	1–0	1–2	4–2	0–0	1–0	2–2	1–0	0–2	1–2
Croatia Zagreb	2–1	1–0		1–0	2–1	3–1	2–1	1–0	1–1	6–0	3–0	3–2	4–1	0–0	4–2	0–0
Hajduk Split	4–0	4–1	3–1		3–1	4–2	0–0	7–1	3–0	2–0	5–2	2–0	3–1	3–1	3–2	2–2
Inker Zaprešić	5–1	0–0	2–1	0–2		4–0	2–2	1–0	1–3	0–0	3–2	3–1	2–1	1–1	4–1	1–1
Istra Pula	6–0	0–1	1–3	0–3	2–2		2–1	2–0	1–1	0–0	1–0	0–2	1–0	1–0	1–0	2–0
Marsonia	2–0	3–0	1–2	1–0	2–1	2–1		4–0	1–3	3–0	3–1	1–0	1–0	1–0	3–0	0–0
Neretva	3–1	0–0	1–1	1–4	3–1	1–1	3–3		0–0	1–1	0–0	2–1	1–1	0–0	3–0	0–1
Osijek	3–2	1–1	0–0	2–1	2–1	3–0	5–2	2–0		5–0	2–0	1–1	1–1	1–1	5–1	6–1
Primorac	3–2	3–2	1–2	0–1	1–2	1–1	1–1	0–0	0–0		0–1	2–1	2–0	0–2	3–1	1–1
Rijeka	1–2	0–0	1–2	0–1	0–1	2–2	1–0	1–0	0–1	0–0		0–0	3–2	1–0	2–1	0–1
Segesta	6–2	0–0	2–1	1–2	0–1	0–0	1–0	1–0	3–1	1–1	1–2		1–0	1–0	1–0	1–1
Šibenik	3–0	3–1	1–3	2–2	1–0	3–2	1–1	2–0	0–4	4–0	0–0	1–0		2–2	3–2	2–2
Varteks	2–1	1–0	1–2	0–0	2–1	2–0	2–0	3–0	2–2	2–4	0–0	3–1	2–0		1–1	0–1
Zadar	3–2	1–1	1–1	1–1	3–0	3–0	0–0	2–0	1–1	2–0	0–0	1–1	1–1	0–0		1–0
NK Zagreb	3–0	3–1	0–0	1–1	2–0	1–0	2–0	2–0	2–0	2–0	0–0	0–2	3–3	1–2	5–0	

Source: RSSSF.org
Legend: Blue = home team win; Yellow = draw; Red = away team win.

== Relegation ==
The league structure was changed after the 1994–95 season, whereby the four relegated teams this season played the next season in League 1-B.

== Top goalscorers ==
Rank	Player	Club	Goals
1	(Croatia) Robert Špehar	NK Zagreb / Osijek	23
2	(Albania) Ylli Shehu	Šibenik	22
3	(Croatia) Renato Jurčec	Inker Zaprešić	20
4	(Croatia) Tomislav Erceg	Hajduk Split	17
5	(Croatia) Alen Peternac	Segesta	13
6	(Croatia) Nenad Pralija	Hajduk Split	11
7	(Croatia) Igor Pamić	Croatia Zagreb	10
7	(Croatia) Hari Vukas	Hajduk Split	10
7	(Croatia) Dragan Vukoja	Osijek	10

== See also ==
- 1994–95 Croatian Second Football League
- 1994–95 Croatian Football Cup

== References and notes ==
- UEFA Site
- http://rsssf.org/tablesk/kroa95.html
