= 1993–94 Croatian First Football League =

Croatian First Football League
- Season: 1993–94
- Champions: Hajduk Split; 2nd Croatian title 11th domestic title
- Relegated: Pazinka; Dubrovnik; Dubrava; Radnik Velika Gorica
- Champions League: Hajduk Split
- Cup Winners' Cup: Croatia Zagreb
- Matches: 306
- Goals: 837 (2.74 per match)
- Top goalscorer: Goran Vlaović (29)
- Biggest home win: Hajduk Split 10–0 Radnik
- Biggest away win: Radnik 0–7 Osijek
- Highest scoring: Croatia Zagreb 10–1 Pazinka
- Average attendance: 2,820

The 1993–94 Croatian First Football League, also known as 1. HNL, was the third season of the top football league in Croatia since its establishment in 1992.

== Promoted teams ==
Primorac Stobreč were promoted as winners of Druga HNL - South division and Dubrava were promoted as the winners of the Druga HNL - North division. The league was therefore expanded to 18 teams, since no relegation had taken place the previous season.

== League table ==
Pos	Team	Pld	W	D	L	GF	GA	GD	Pts	Qualification or relegation
1	Hajduk Split (C)	34	22	6	6	84	36	+48	50	Qualification to Champions League qualifying round
2	NK Zagreb	34	20	9	5	58	30	+28	49	
3	Croatia Zagreb	34	20	8	6	98	34	+64	48	Qualification to Cup Winners' Cup first round
4	Inker Zaprešić	34	17	8	9	48	34	+14	42	
5	Varteks	34	16	9	9	51	31	+20	41	
6	Rijeka	34	11	17	6	40	27	+13	39	
7	Cibalia	34	11	13	10	37	27	+10	35	
8	Osijek	34	12	11	11	56	58	−2	35	
9	Segesta	34	12	10	12	48	44	+4	34	
10	Istra Pula	34	13	8	13	40	36	+4	34	
11	Zadar	34	8	17	9	24	36	−12	33	
12	Belišće	34	12	8	14	55	51	+4	32	
13	Šibenik	34	12	8	14	36	42	−6	32	
14	Primorac	34	11	7	16	42	54	−12	29	
15	Pazinka (R)	34	8	9	17	51	67	−16	25	Relegation to Croatian Second Football League
16	Dubrovnik (R)	34	7	9	18	26	60	−34	23	Relegation to Croatian Second Football League
17	Dubrava (R)	34	7	9	18	28	63	−35	23	Relegation to Croatian Second Football League
18	Radnik Velika Gorica (R)	34	3	2	29	17	109	−92	8	Relegation to Croatian Second Football League

Source: RSSSF.org
Rules for classification: 1st points; 2nd head-to-head points.
(C) Champions; (R) Relegated

== Results ==
Home \ Away	BEL	CIB	CZG	DUB	DBK	HAJ	INK	IST	OSI	PAZ	PRI	RVG	RIJ	SEG	ŠIB	VAR	ZAD	ZAG
Belišće		1–1	0–6	3–0	2–1	2–0	1–1	1–2	3–3	2–0	1–1	7–1	1–1	3–0	3–0	3–0	0–1	2–4
Cibalia	3–2		1–2	2–0	3–0	1–0	2–0	0–0	1–1	3–0	3–0	3–0	0–0	3–1	2–0	0–0	0–0	0–1
Croatia Zagreb	1–2	0–0		5–3	8–2	4–0	2–3	3–2	7–1	10–1	1–0	5–0	2–0	2–0	4–0	1–1	3–0	1–1
Dubrava	2–1	1–2	1–0		0–0	3–4	0–0	0–0	0–1	3–2	3–0	0–1	0–0	1–1	3–1	1–0	2–2	0–2
Dubrovnik	0–0	1–0	0–1	0–0		1–1	0–1	0–1	0–0	2–0	3–2	1–0	0–0	0–1	1–2	1–1	1–2	1–0
Hajduk Split	4–2	3–2	4–2	4–0	6–0		2–1	4–1	3–1	5–1	4–1	10–0	0–2	1–1	2–0	2–0	3–0	4–0
Inker Zaprešić	2–1	0–0	1–1	0–0	3–0	1–1		2–0	3–1	4–0	4–0	3–1	2–1	1–2	1–0	1–0	2–0	1–0
Istra Pula	4–2	1–0	0–0	0–0	2–1	0–1	2–3		2–0	1–0	0–1	5–1	1–0	0–0	2–1	2–0	2–0	2–3
Osijek	0–2	1–1	2–2	4–2	3–0	1–4	1–0	2–1		1–1	4–2	3–1	2–0	2–1	2–1	1–1	2–0	1–3
Pazinka	4–1	2–0	4–6	4–0	3–1	1–2	2–3	0–0	4–1		4–0	6–1	0–0	1–1	2–3	0–0	0–0	2–4
Primorac	1–0	2–1	0–4	7–0	4–2	0–2	1–1	3–1	2–1	1–3		4–0	1–1	2–0	1–0	0–1	0–1	1–1
Radnik Velika Gorica	1–2	1–1	0–5	0–1	2–0	1–3	0–2	0–4	0–7	2–1	0–3		0–3	0–1	0–1	0–3	2–4	0–1
Rijeka	2–0	0–0	0–3	2–1	2–2	2–1	2–1	2–0	1–1	3–1	0–0	6–0		0–0	1–1	3–0	0–0	2–2
Segesta	1–3	1–1	2–6	5–1	4–0	1–1	2–0	1–1	4–2	1–1	3–0	4–0	2–0		3–1	1–2	3–1	0–1
Šibenik	2–1	2–0	0–0	2–0	2–2	0–0	4–1	1–0	0–0	0–0	0–0	2–0	1–1	2–1		3–1	3–0	0–3
Varteks	1–0	2–0	1–0	5–0	0–1	3–1	3–0	2–0	4–2	4–0	3–1	3–0	1–1	3–0	2–0		1–1	0–2
Zadar	0–0	1–0	1–0	1–0	1–2	1–1	0–0	0–0	1–1	0–0	1–1	1–1	0–0	0–0	2–1	1–1		1–1
NK Zagreb	1–1	1–1	1–1	2–0	3–0	0–1	2–0	2–1	1–1	2–1	1–0	4–1	1–2	2–0	1–0	2–2	3–0	

Source: RSSSF.org
Legend: Blue = home team win; Yellow = draw; Red = away team win.

== Top goalscorers ==
Rank	Player	Club	Goals
1	(Croatia) Goran Vlaović	Croatia Zagreb	29
2	(Croatia) Igor Cvitanović	Croatia Zagreb	27
3	(Croatia) Rudika Vida	Belišće	26
4	(Croatia) Mladen Mladenović	Rijeka	20
5	(Croatia) Tomislav Erceg	Hajduk Split	18
5	(Croatia) Joško Popović	NK Zagreb	18
5	(Croatia) Robert Špehar	NK Zagreb / Osijek	18
5	(Croatia) Igor Pamić	Croatia Zagreb	18
9	(Croatia) Davor Vugrinec	Varteks	17
10	(Croatia) Antun Labak	Osijek	16

== Trivia ==
- Goran Vlaović of Croatia Zagreb scored five goals in Croatia's 10–1 win against Pazinka. He was also the top goalscorer of the season.
- Hajduk's 10–0 win against Radnik is the highest ever margin of victory achieved in Prva HNL.

== See also ==
- 1993–94 Croatian Football Cup
- 1993–94 Croatian Second Football League
