= 1993 Croatian Football Cup final =

- Event: 1992–93 Croatian Cup
Hajduk Split	Croatia Zagreb
5	3

First leg
Hajduk Split	Croatia Zagreb
4	1
- Date: 19 May 1993
- Venue: Stadion Poljud, Split
- Referee: Dragutin Poljak (Zagreb)
- Attendance: 45,000

Second leg
Croatia Zagreb	Hajduk Split
2	1
- Date: 2 June 1993
- Venue: Stadion Maksimir, Zagreb
- Referee: Mateo Beusan (Dubrovnik)
- Attendance: 45,000

The 1993 Croatian Cup final was a two-legged affair played between Hajduk Split and Croatia Zagreb. The first leg was played in Split on 19 May 1993, while the second leg on 2 June 1993 in Zagreb.

Hajduk Split won the trophy with an aggregate result of 5–3.

== Road to the final ==
Hajduk Split		Round	Croatia Zagreb^{1}	
Opponent	Result		Opponent	Result
RNK Split	0–3	First round	Rudeš	1–0
RNK Split	4–0	First round	Rudeš	13–0
Kraljevica	1–0	Second round	Slavonija Požega	5–2
Kraljevica	4–0	Second round	Slavonija Požega	11–0
Osijek	2–0	Quarter-finals	Varteks	2–1
Osijek	3–0	Quarter-finals	Varteks	1–0
Zadar	2–0	Semi-finals	Inker Zaprešić	2–1
Zadar	2–2	Semi-finals	Inker Zaprešić	1–1

^{1}Croatia Zagreb was called HAŠK Građanski in the autumn part of the season.

== First leg ==
19 May 1993
17:30

Hajduk Split	4–1	Croatia Zagreb
Kozniku 35', 53'; Jeličić 45'; Novaković 77'	Report	Stanić 75'

Stadion Poljud, Split
Attendance: 45,000
Referee: Dragutin Poljak (Zagreb)

HAJDUK SPLIT:
GK	1	(Croatia) Vatroslav Mihačić
DF	2	(Croatia) Darko Butorović
MF	3	(Croatia) Mario Novaković
DF	4	(Croatia) Joško Španjić
DF	5	(Croatia) Saša Peršon	(yellow card) 69'
DF	6	(Croatia) Slaven Bilić
MF	7	(Croatia) Joško Jeličić
MF	8	(Croatia) Ante Miše (c)
MF	9	(Croatia) Milan Rapaić		(substituted off) 58'
FW	10	(Croatia) Ivica Mornar		(substituted off) 67'
FW	11	(Croatia) Ardian Kozniku
Substitutes:
DF	?	(Croatia) Stipe Balajić		(substituted on) 58'
DF	?	(Croatia) Robert Vladislavić		(substituted on) 67'
Manager:
(Croatia) Ivan Katalinić

CROATIA ZAGREB:
GK	1	(Croatia) Dražen Ladić		(substituted off) 46'
MF	2	(Croatia) Dževad Turković	(yellow card) 18'
DF	3	(Croatia) Damir Lesjak	(yellow card) 9'
DF	4	(Croatia) Andrej Panadić
FW	5	(Croatia) Mario Stanić
DF	6	(Croatia) Slavko Ištvanić (c)
MF	7	(Bosnia and Herzegovina) Sejad Halilović
MF	8	(Croatia) Željko Adžić
FW	9	(Croatia) Goran Vlaović
DF	10	(Croatia) Vjekoslav Škrinjar
FW	11	(Croatia) Igor Cvitanović	(yellow card) 69'
Substitutes:
GK	12	(Croatia) Miralem Ibrahimović		(substituted on) 46'
Manager:
(Croatia) Miroslav Blažević

== Second leg ==
2 June 1993
20:15

Croatia Zagreb	2–1	Hajduk Split
Vlaović 15' (pen.), 71' (pen.)	Report	Kozniku 82'

Stadion Maksimir, Zagreb
Attendance: 45,000
Referee: Mateo Beusan (Dubrovnik)

CROATIA ZAGREB:
GK	1	(Croatia) Miralem Ibrahimović
DF	2	(Croatia) Dario Šimić	(yellow card) 35'	(substituted off) 46'
DF	3	(Croatia) Goran Borović	(yellow card) 29'
DF	4	(Croatia) Andrej Panadić
MF	5	(Croatia) Josip Gašpar
DF	6	(Croatia) Slavko Ištvanić (c)
MF	7	(Bosnia and Herzegovina) Sejad Halilović
MF	8	(Croatia) Željko Adžić	(yellow card) 17'
FW	9	(Croatia) Goran Vlaović
FW	10	(Croatia) Mario Stanić
MF	11	(Croatia) Željko Pakasin
Substitutes:
MF	15	(Croatia) Silvio Marić		(substituted on) 46'
FW	?	(Croatia) Alen Peternac
Manager:
(Croatia) Miroslav Blažević

HAJDUK SPLIT:
GK	1	(Croatia) Vatroslav Mihačić
DF	2	(Croatia) Darko Butorović
MF	3	(Croatia) Mario Novaković	(yellow card) 51'
DF	4	(Croatia) Joško Španjić
MF	5	(Croatia) Stipe Balajić
DF	6	(Croatia) Slaven Bilić
MF	7	(Croatia) Joško Jeličić
MF	8	(Croatia) Ante Miše (c)
MF	9	(Croatia) Milan Rapaić		(substituted off) 72'
FW	10	(Croatia) Ivica Mornar	(yellow card) 43'	(substituted off) 80'
FW	11	(Croatia) Ardian Kozniku
Substitutes:
MF	14	(Croatia) Dean Računica		(substituted on) 80'
FW	16	(Croatia) Tomislav Erceg		(substituted on) 72'
Manager:
(Croatia) Ivan Katalinić
