= 1998 Croatian Football Cup final =

- Event: 1997–98 Croatian Cup
Varteks	Croatia Zagreb
1	3

First leg
Varteks	Croatia Zagreb
0	1
- Date: 6 May 1998
- Venue: Stadion Varteks, Varaždin
- Referee: Miroslav Vitković (Vinkovci)
- Attendance: 7,000

Second leg
Croatia Zagreb	Varteks
2	1
- Date: 14 May 1998
- Venue: Stadion Maksimir, Zagreb
- Referee: Edo Trivković (Split)
- Attendance: 15,000

The 1998 Croatian Cup final was a two-legged affair played between Croatia Zagreb and Varteks. The first leg was played in Zagreb on 6 May 1998, while the second leg on 14 May 1998 in Varaždin.

Croatia Zagreb won the trophy with an aggregate result of 3–1.

== Road to the final ==
Croatia Zagreb		Round	Varteks	
Opponent	Result		Opponent	Result
Slavonac	5–1	First round	Varaždin	2–1
Špansko	11–0	Second round	Croatia Đakovo	0–0 (a.e.t.) (4–2 p)
Badel Sesvete	1–1	Quarter-finals	Orijent	0–0
Badel Sesvete	4–1	Quarter-finals	Orijent	0–0 (3–0 p)
NK Zagreb	4–0	Semi-finals	Hajduk Split	2–1
NK Zagreb	3–0	Semi-finals	Hajduk Split	1–0

== First leg ==
6 May 1998

Varteks	0–1	Croatia Zagreb
	Report	Mikić 82'

Stadion Varteks, Varaždin
Attendance: 7,000
Referee: Miroslav Vitković (Vinkovci)

VARTEKS
(Croatia) Ivica Solomun
(Croatia) Ivan Režić	(substituted off) 60'
(Croatia) Danijel Hrman	(yellow card) 10'
(Croatia) Dražen Besek
(Croatia) Samir Toplak
(Croatia) Dražen Madunović
(Croatia) Robert Težački	(substituted off) 62'
(Croatia) Andrija Balajić
(Croatia) Tomislav Vincelj
(Croatia) Dražen Horvat	(substituted off) 74'
(Bosnia and Herzegovina) Marko Topić
Substitutes:
(Croatia) Silvester Sabolčki	(substituted on) 60'
(Croatia) Mario Obadić	(substituted on) 62'
(Croatia) Dejan Car	(substituted on) 74'
Manager:
(Croatia) Dražen Besek

CROATIA ZAGREB
(Croatia) Dražen Ladić
(Croatia) Tomislav Rukavina
(Croatia) Mario Cvitanović
(Croatia) Igor Bišćan
(Croatia) Stjepan Tomas
(Croatia) Krunoslav Jurčić
(Croatia) Danijel Šarić
(Croatia) Robert Prosinečki	(yellow card) 10'
(Australia) Mark Viduka	(substituted off) 88'
(Croatia) Silvio Marić	(substituted off) 76'
(Croatia) Vladimir Petrović	(substituted off) 46'
Substitutes:
(Croatia) Mihael Mikić	(substituted on) 46'
(Croatia) Joško Jeličić	(substituted on) 76'
(Croatia) Tomislav Šokota	(substituted on) 88'
Manager:
(Croatia) Zlatko Kranjčar

== Second leg ==
14 May 1998

Croatia Zagreb	2–1	Varteks
Viduka 52'; Marić 83'	Report	Topić 38'

Stadion Maksimir, Zagreb
Attendance: 15,000
Referee: Edo Trivković (Split)

CROATIA ZAGREB
(Croatia) Dražen Ladić
(Croatia) Danijel Šarić	(substituted off) 70'
(Croatia) Tomislav Rukavina
(Croatia) Dario Šimić
(Croatia) Stjepan Tomas
(Croatia) Krunoslav Jurčić
(Bosnia and Herzegovina) Edin Mujčin	(substituted off) 46'
(Croatia) Robert Prosinečki
(Australia) Mark Viduka
(Croatia) Silvio Marić	(yellow card) 10'
(Croatia) Mihael Mikić	(substituted off) 58'
Substitutes:
(Croatia) Damir Krznar	(substituted on) 46'
(Croatia) Igor Bišćan	(substituted on) 58'
(Croatia) Tomislav Šokota	(substituted on) 70'
Manager:
(Croatia) Zlatko Kranjčar

VARTEKS
(Croatia) Ivica Solomun
(Croatia) Ivan Režić	(yellow card) 10'
(Croatia) Samir Toplak
(Croatia) Dražen Besek
(Croatia) Robert Težački	(substituted off) 74'
(Croatia) Zoran Kastel	(substituted off) 55'
(Croatia) Dražen Madunović
(Croatia) Danijel Hrman
(Bosnia and Herzegovina) Marko Topić
(Croatia) Miljenko Mumlek
(Croatia) Andrija Balajić	(substituted off) 87'
Substitutes:
(Croatia) Mario Obadić	(yellow card) 10'	(substituted on) 55'
(Croatia) Dejan Car	(substituted on) 74'
(Croatia) Dražen Horvat	(substituted on) 87'
Manager:
(Croatia) Dražen Besek
