= 1994 Croatian Football Cup final =

- Event: 1993–94 Croatian Cup
| Croatia Zagreb | Rijeka |
| 2 | 1 |

First leg
| Croatia Zagreb | Rijeka |
| 2 | 0 |
- Date: 1 June 1994
- Venue: Stadion Maksimir, Zagreb
- Referee: Veljko Matković (Rijeka)
- Attendance: 15,000

Second leg
| Rijeka | Croatia Zagreb |
| 0 | 0 |
- Date: 15 June 1994
- Venue: Stadion Kantrida, Rijeka
- Referee: Darko Cvitković (Zagreb)
- Attendance: 15,000

The 1994 Croatian Cup final was a two-legged affair played between Croatia Zagreb and Rijeka. The first leg was played in Zagreb on 1 June 1994, while the second leg on 15 June 1994 in Rijeka.

Croatia Zagreb won the trophy with an aggregate result of 2–1.

== Road to the final ==
| Croatia Zagreb | | Round | Rijeka | |
|---|---|---|---|---|
| Opponent | Result | | Opponent | Result |
| Marsonia | 5–0 | First round | Budućnost Hodošan | 3–0 |
| Marsonia | 0–1 | First round | Budućnost Hodošan | 3–2 |
| Šibenik | 1–0 | Second round | Belišće | 0–0 |
| Šibenik | 3–2 | Second round | Belišće | 4–1 |
| Varteks | 1–0 | Quarter-finals | Bjelovar | 0–1 |
| Varteks | 1–2 (a) | Quarter-finals | Bjelovar | 4–0 |
| NK Zagreb | 2–2 | Semi-finals | Hajduk Split | 3–3 |
| NK Zagreb | 1–0 | Semi-finals | Hajduk Split | 0–0 (a) |

== First leg ==
1 June 1994
20:00

| Croatia Zagreb | 2–0 | Rijeka |
|---|---|---|
| Turković 12'; Cvitanović 48' | Report |

Stadion Maksimir, Zagreb
Attendance: 15,000
Referee: Veljko Matković (Rijeka)

CROATIA ZAGREB:
| GK | 1 | (Croatia) Dražen Ladić | Booked |
| MF | 2 | (Croatia) Dževad Turković |
| DF | 3 | (Croatia) Damir Lesjak |
| DF | 4 | (Croatia) Dario Šimić |
| DF | 5 | (Croatia) Zoran Mamić | Booked | (substituted off) 65' |
| DF | 6 | (Croatia) Slavko Ištvanić |
| MF | 7 | (Croatia) Sejad Halilović |
| MF | 8 | (Croatia) Josip Gašpar |
| FW | 9 | (Croatia) Goran Vlaović | | (substituted off) 77' |
| MF | 10 | (Croatia) Vjekoslav Škrinjar |
| FW | 11 | (Croatia) Igor Cvitanović | Booked |
Substitutes:
| MF | | (Croatia) Joško Jeličić | | (substituted on) 65' |
| FW | | (Croatia) Željko Adžić | | (substituted on) 77' |
Manager:
(Croatia) Miroslav Blažević

RIJEKA:
| GK | 1 | (Croatia) Mladen Žganjer |
| DF | 2 | (Croatia) Ivan Kurtović |
| DF | 3 | (Croatia) Leandar Kelentrić |
| MF | 4 | (Croatia) Alen Horvat | (red card) 43' |
| DF | 5 | (Croatia) Stojan Belajić |
| DF | 6 | (Croatia) Elvis Brajković |
| MF | 7 | (Croatia) Dragan Raković | | (substituted off) 50' |
| MF | 8 | (Croatia) Mladen Mladenović (c) |
| MF | 9 | (Croatia) Andrej Živković |
| MF | 10 | (Bosnia and Herzegovina) Fuad Šašivarević | Booked |
| FW | 11 | (Croatia) Damir Knežević | | (substituted off) 46' |
Substitutes:
| DF | | (Croatia) Robert Rubčić | | (substituted on) 46' |
| FW | | (Croatia) Elvis Scoria | | (substituted on) 50' |
Manager:
(Croatia) Srećko Juričić

== Second leg ==
15 June 1994
20:10

| Rijeka | 1–0 | Croatia Zagreb |
|---|---|---|
| Pavličić 3' | Report |

Stadion Kantrida, Rijeka
Attendance: 15,000
Referee: Darko Cvitković (Zagreb)

RIJEKA:
| GK | 1 | (Croatia) Mladen Žganjer |
| DF | 2 | (Croatia) Ivan Kurtović |
| DF | 3 | (Croatia) Robert Rubčić | | (substituted off) 78' |
| MF | 4 | (Croatia) Alen Horvat | Booked |
| DF | 5 | (Croatia) Dubravko Pavličić |
| DF | 6 | (Croatia) Elvis Brajković |
| MF | 7 | (Croatia) Dragan Raković | | (substituted off) 67' |
| MF | 8 | (Croatia) Mladen Mladenović (c) |
| FW | 9 | (Croatia) Elvis Scoria | Booked |
| MF | 10 | (Croatia) Andrej Živković |
| FW | 11 | (Croatia) Jasmin Samardžić |
Substitutes:
| DF | 14 | (Croatia) Stojan Belajić | | (substituted on) 78' |
| FW | 16 | (Croatia) Ilija Aračić | | (substituted on) 67' |
Manager:
(Croatia) Srećko Juričić

CROATIA ZAGREB:
| GK | 1 | (Croatia) Dražen Ladić |
| MF | 2 | (Croatia) Dževad Turković |
| DF | 3 | (Croatia) Damir Lesjak |
| DF | 4 | (Croatia) Andrej Panadić |
| DF | 5 | (Croatia) Dario Šimić |
| DF | 6 | (Croatia) Slavko Ištvanić |
| MF | 7 | (Croatia) Sejad Halilović | (substituted off) 78' |
| MF | 8 | (Croatia) Josip Gašpar |
| FW | 9 | (Croatia) Goran Vlaović |
| MF | 10 | (Croatia) Vjekoslav Škrinjar | (substituted off) 87' |
| FW | 11 | (Croatia) Igor Cvitanović |
Substitutes:
| MF | 13 | (Croatia) Mario Novaković | (substituted on) 78' |
| FW | 15 | (Croatia) Željko Adžić | (substituted on) 87' |
Manager:
(Croatia) Miroslav Blažević
