= 1995 Croatian Football Cup final =

- Event: 1994–95 Croatian Cup
Hajduk Split	Croatia Zagreb
4	2

First leg
Hajduk Split	Croatia Zagreb
3	2
- Date: 17 May 1995
- Venue: Stadion Poljud, Split
- Referee: Željko Širić (Osijek)
- Attendance: 15,000

Second leg
Croatia Zagreb	Hajduk Split
0	1
- Date: 28 May 1995
- Venue: Stadion Maksimir, Zagreb
- Referee: Ivan Vranaričić (Đakovo)
- Attendance: 17,000

The 1995 Croatian Cup final was a two-legged affair played between Hajduk Split and Croatia Zagreb. The first leg was played in Split on 17 May 1995, while the second leg on 28 May 1995 in Zagreb.

Hajduk Split won the trophy with an aggregate result of 4–2.

== Road to the final ==
Hajduk Split		Round	Croatia Zagreb	
Opponent	Result		Opponent	Result
Gospić	5–0	First round	Bedem Ivankovo	3–0
Gospić	5–1	First round	Bedem Ivankovo	5–3
Špansko	1–1	Second round	Belišće	1–2
Špansko	4–3	Second round	Belišće	4–1
Segesta	1–1	Quarter-finals	Cibalia	0–0
Segesta	3–0	Quarter-finals	Cibalia	1–0
Varteks	1–1	Semi-finals	Osijek	2–0
Varteks	4–0	Semi-finals	Osijek	2–1

== First leg ==
17 May 1995
18:00

Hajduk Split	3–2	Croatia Zagreb
Erceg 40', 51'; Asanović 77'	Report	Pamić 46'; Jeličić 75'

Stadion Poljud, Split
Attendance: 15,000
Referee: Željko Širić (Osijek)

HAJDUK SPLIT:
1	(Croatia) Tonči Gabrić	(red card) 88'
2	(Croatia) Darko Butorović
3	(Croatia) Darko Jozinović	(substituted off) 64'
4	(Bosnia and Herzegovina) Mirsad Hibić
5	(Croatia) Igor Štimac
6	(Croatia) Saša Peršon
7	(Croatia) Kazimir Vulić
8	(Croatia) Nenad Pralija
9	(Croatia) Tomislav Erceg
10	(Croatia) Aljoša Asanović
11	(Croatia) Renato Jurčec	(substituted off) 60'
Substitutes:
(Croatia) Ivica Mornar	(substituted on) 60'
(Croatia) Milan Rapaić	(substituted on) 64'
Manager:
(Croatia) Ivan Katalinić

CROATIA ZAGREB:
1	(Croatia) Dražen Ladić
2	(Croatia) Dževad Turković
3	(Croatia) Damir Lesjak
4	(Croatia) Dario Šimić
5	(Croatia) Zvonimir Soldo
6	(Croatia) Slavko Ištvanić	(substituted off) 68'
7	(Croatia) Josip Gašpar
8	(Croatia) Joško Jeličić
9	(Croatia) Igor Pamić	(substituted off) 89'
10	(Croatia) Marko Mlinarić
11	(Croatia) Igor Cvitanović
Substitutes:
	(Croatia) Mario Novaković	(substituted on) 68'
	(Croatia) Alen Peternac	(substituted on) 89'
Manager:
(Croatia) Zlatko Kranjčar

== Second leg ==
28 May 1995
18:00

Croatia Zagreb	0–1	Hajduk Split
	Report	Asanović 45'

Stadion Maksimir, Zagreb
Attendance: 17,000
Referee: Ivan Vranaričić (Đakovo)

CROATIA ZAGREB:
1	(Croatia) Dražen Ladić
2	(Croatia) Dževad Turković
3	(Croatia) Damir Lesjak
4	(Croatia) Dario Šimić	(red card) 80'
5	(Croatia) Zvonimir Soldo
6	(Croatia) Slavko Ištvanić
7	(Croatia) Miljenko Kovačić
8	(Croatia) Mario Novaković	(substituted off) 65'
9	(Croatia) Igor Pamić
10	(Croatia) Marko Mlinarić
11	(Croatia) Igor Cvitanović
Substitutes:
(Croatia) Alen Peternac	(substituted on) 65'
Manager:
(Croatia) Zlatko Kranjčar

HAJDUK SPLIT:
1	(Croatia) Tonči Gabrić	(substituted off) 46'
2	(Croatia) Darko Butorović
3	(Croatia) Darko Jozinović
4	(Bosnia and Herzegovina) Mirsad Hibić
5	(Croatia) Kazimir Vulić
6	(Croatia) Saša Peršon
7	(Croatia) Zoran Vulić
8	(Croatia) Nenad Pralija
9	(Croatia) Renato Jurčec	(substituted off) 73'
10	(Croatia) Aljoša Asanović
11	(Croatia) Ivica Mornar	(substituted off) 65'
Substitutes:
	(Croatia) Zoran Slavica	(substituted on) 46'
	(Bosnia and Herzegovina) Sead Seferović	(substituted on) 65'
	(Croatia) Ivan Jurić	(substituted on) 73'
Manager:
(Croatia) Ivan Katalinić
