= 1996 Croatian Football Cup final =

- Event: 1995–96 Croatian Cup
Varteks	Croatia Zagreb
0	3

First leg
Varteks	Croatia Zagreb
0	2
- Date: 1 May 1996
- Venue: Stadion Varteks, Varaždin
- Referee: Ante Kulušić (Šibenik)
- Attendance: 11,000

Second leg
Croatia Zagreb	Varteks
1	0
- Date: 16 May 1996
- Venue: Stadion Maksimir, Zagreb
- Referee: Ante Kulušić (Šibenik)
- Attendance: 20,000

The 1996 Croatian Cup final was a two-legged affair played between Croatia Zagreb and Varteks. The first leg was played in Zagreb on 1 May 1996, while the second leg on 16 May 1996 in Varaždin.

Croatia Zagreb won the trophy with an aggregate result of 3–0.

== Road to the final ==
Croatia Zagreb		Round	Varteks	
Opponent	Result		Opponent	Result
MIV Sračinec	11–0	First round	Jedinstvo Donji Miholjac	5–0
MIV Sračinec	10–1	First round	Jedinstvo Donji Miholjac	4–0
Belišće	2–2	Second round	Šibenik	1–1
Belišće	6–1	Second round	Šibenik	4–0
Marsonia	5–0	Quarter-finals	Osijek	4–1
Marsonia	5–0	Quarter-finals	Osijek	0–0
Zadar	3–1	Semi-finals	NK Zagreb	2–1
Zadar	2–1	Semi-finals	NK Zagreb	3–0

== First leg ==
1 May 1996
17:00

Varteks	0–2	Croatia Zagreb
	Report	Viduka 8'; Cvitanović 12'

Stadion Varteks, Varaždin
Attendance: 11,000
Referee: Ante Kulušić (Šibenik)

VARTEKS:
GK	1	(Croatia) Marijan Mrmić
DF	2	(Croatia) Samir Toplak
DF	3	(Croatia) Ivica Bančić	Booked	(substituted off) 46'
DF	4	(Croatia) Dražen Madunović		(substituted off) 74'
DF	5	(Croatia) Grgica Kovač
DF	6	(Croatia) Robert Težački		(substituted off) 46'
MF	7	(Croatia) Mladen Posavec
MF	8	(Croatia) Dražen Besek
FW	9	(Croatia) Davor Vugrinec
MF	10	(Croatia) Zoran Brlenić
DF	11	(Croatia) Andrija Balajić
Substitutes:
MF	8	(Croatia) Miljenko Mumlek		(substituted on) 46'
DF		(Bosnia and Herzegovina) Mesud Duraković		(substituted on) 46'
DF		(Croatia) Saša Paska		(substituted on) 74'
Manager:
(Croatia) Luka Bonačić

CROATIA ZAGREB:
GK	1	(Croatia) Dražen Ladić (c)
DF	2	(Croatia) Danijel Štefulj
DF	3	(Croatia) Damir Krznar
DF	5	(Croatia) Zvonimir Soldo	Booked
FW	9	(Australia) Mark Viduka		(substituted off) 46'
MF	10	(Croatia) Marko Mlinarić		(substituted off) 75'
MF	11	(Croatia) Tomislav Rukavina
DF	13	(Croatia) Dario Šimić	Booked
MF	20	(Croatia) Zoran Mamić
FW	21	(Croatia) Igor Cvitanović		(substituted off) 89'
DF	6	(Croatia) Srđan Mladinić	Booked
Substitutes:
FW		(Bosnia and Herzegovina) Zoran Slišković	Booked	(substituted on) 46'
MF	15	(Croatia) Daniel Šarić		(substituted on) 75'
MF	4	(Croatia) Silvio Marić		(substituted on) 89'
Manager:
(Croatia) Zlatko Kranjčar

== Second leg ==
16 May 1996
20:15

Croatia Zagreb	1–0	Varteks
Cvitanović 60' (pen.)	Report

Stadion Maksimir, Zagreb
Attendance: 20,000
Referee: Ante Kulušić (Šibenik)

CROATIA ZAGREB:
GK	1	(Croatia) Dražen Ladić (c)
DF	2	(Croatia) Danijel Štefulj
DF	3	(Croatia) Damir Krznar
DF	5	(Croatia) Zvonimir Soldo
MF	7	(Croatia) Josip Gašpar
FW	9	(Australia) Mark Viduka		Substituted off
MF	10	(Croatia) Marko Mlinarić		(substituted off) 28'
MF	11	(Croatia) Tomislav Rukavina
DF	13	(Croatia) Dario Šimić
MF	20	(Croatia) Zoran Mamić		(substituted off) 75'
FW	21	(Croatia) Igor Cvitanović	Booked
Substitutes:
MF	14	(Bosnia and Herzegovina) Edin Mujčin		(substituted on) 28'
DF	8	(Croatia) Alen Petrović		(substituted on) 75'
FW		(Bosnia and Herzegovina) Zoran Slišković		Substituted on
Manager:
(Croatia) Zlatko Kranjčar

VARTEKS:
GK	1	(Croatia) Marijan Mrmić
DF	3	(Croatia) Dražen Madunović		(substituted off) 75'
MF	4	(Croatia) Zlatko Dalić		(substituted off) 82'
MF	8	(Croatia) Miljenko Mumlek		(substituted off) 61'
FW	9	(Croatia) Davor Vugrinec
DF		(Croatia) Samir Toplak	Booked
DF		(Croatia) Grgica Kovač	Booked
MF		(Croatia) Mladen Posavec
DF		(Croatia) Krunoslav Gregorić
MF		(Croatia) Zoran Brlenić
DF		(Croatia) Andrija Balajić
Substitutes:
MF		(Croatia) Mario Ivanković		(substituted on) 61'
DF	13	(Croatia) Ivica Bančić		(substituted on) 75'
DF	15	(Croatia) Robert Težački		(substituted on) 82'
Manager:
(Croatia) Luka Bonačić
