= 1997 Croatian Football Cup final =

- Event: 1996–97 Croatian Cup
Croatia Zagreb	NK Zagreb
2	1
- Date: 29 May 1997
- Venue: Stadion Maksimir, Zagreb
- Referee: Goran Marić (Zagreb)
- Attendance: 15,000

The 1997 Croatian Cup final was a one-legged affair played between the city rivals Croatia Zagreb and NK Zagreb. The leg was played in Zagreb on 29 May 1997.

Croatia Zagreb won the trophy with a result of 2–1.

== Road to the final ==
Croatia Zagreb		Round	NK Zagreb	
Opponent	Result		Opponent	Result
Zrinski Bošnjaci	5–0	First round	Solin Kaltenberg	3–0
Slaven Belupo	6–3	Second round	Zagorec Krapina	2–1
Dubrovnik	1–1	Quarter-finals	Inker Zaprešić	3–0
Dubrovnik	4–0	Quarter-finals	Inker Zaprešić	1–0
Osijek	2–1	Semi-finals	Hrvatski Dragovoljac	3–1
Osijek	0–0	Semi-finals	Hrvatski Dragovoljac	3–1

== Final ==
29 May 1997
20:30

Croatia Zagreb	2–1	NK Zagreb
Cvitanović 30' (pen.); Viduka 69'	Report	Sopić 77'

Stadion Maksimir, Zagreb
Attendance: 15,000
Referee: Goran Marić (Zagreb)

CROATIA ZAGREB:
GK	1	(Croatia) Dražen Ladić (c)
DF	6	(Croatia) Srđan Mladinić
DF	26	(Croatia) Goran Jurić
DF	13	(Croatia) Dario Šimić
DF	2	(Croatia) Damir Krznar
MF	7	(Croatia) Josip Gašpar		(substituted off) 22'
DF	15	(Croatia) Daniel Šarić
MF	14	(Croatia) Edin Mujčin
MF	4	(Croatia) Silvio Marić	(red card) 90'
FW	21	(Croatia) Igor Cvitanović
FW	9	(Croatia) Mark Viduka		(substituted off) 89'
Substitutes:
FW		(Croatia) Vladimir Petrović		(substituted on) 22'
DF		(Croatia) Stjepan Tomas		(substituted on) 89'
Manager:
(Croatia) Otto Barić

NK ZAGREB:
GK	1	(Croatia) Sandro Tomić
DF	17	(Croatia) Dražen Biškup (c)
DF	6	(Croatia) Mario Osibov
DF	8	(Croatia) Jasenko Sabitović
MF	22	(Bosnia and Herzegovina) Ibrahim Duro
DF	2	(Croatia) Marinko Galić	(red card) 60'
FW	9	(Croatia) Nino Bule		(substituted off) 79'
DF	14	(Croatia) Vjekoslav Škrinjar
MF	15	(Croatia) Sunaj Keqi		(substituted off) 62'
FW	10	(Croatia) Mate Baturina		(substituted off) 46'
FW	25	(Croatia) Elvis Scoria	(red card) 45'
Substitutes:
MF		(Croatia) Željko Sopić		(substituted on) 46'
MF		(Croatia) Mario Čižmek		(substituted on) 62'
MF		(Croatia) Robert Regvar		(substituted on) 79'
Manager:
(Croatia) Krešimir Ganjto
