= 1992 Croatian Football Cup final =

- Event: 1992 Croatian Cup
Inker Zaprešić	HAŠK Građanski
2	1

First leg
Inker Zaprešić	HAŠK Građanski
1	1
- Date: 19 June 1992
- Venue: Stadion Inkera, Zaprešić
- Referee: Atif Lipovac (Zagreb)
- Attendance: 12,000

Second leg
HAŠK Građanski	Inker Zaprešić
0	1
- Date: 23 June 1992
- Venue: Stadion Maksimir, Zagreb
- Referee: Ivan Vranaričić (Đakovo)
- Attendance: 25,000

The 1992 Croatian Cup final was a two-legged affair played between Inker Zaprešić and HAŠK Građanski. The first leg was played in Zaprešić on 19 June 1992, while the second leg on 23 June 1992 in Zagreb.

Inker Zaprešić won the trophy with an aggregate result of 5–3.

== Road to the final ==
Inker Zaprešić		Round	HAŠK Građanski	
Opponent	Result		Opponent	Result
Osijek	2–0	Quarter-finals	Rovinj	6–0
Osijek	1–1	Quarter-finals	Rovinj	1–0
Croatia Đakovo	5–0	Semi-finals	Rijeka	1–2
Croatia Đakovo	2–1	Semi-finals	Rijeka	2–1 (3–1 p)

== First leg ==
19 June 1992
17:30

Inker Zaprešić	1–1	HAŠK Građanski
Živković 78'	Report	Adžić 89'

Stadion Inkera, Zaprešić
Attendance: 12,000
Referee: Atif Lipovac (Zagreb)

INKER ZAPREŠIĆ:
GK	1	(Croatia) Krešimir Bronić
DF	2	(Croatia) Ivica Antolić	(yellow card) ?'
DF	3	(Croatia) Zoran Živković
DF	4	(Croatia) Damir Kasumović (c)
MF	5	(Croatia) Zvonimir Soldo
MF	6	(Croatia) Miroslav Šorgić
DF	7	(Croatia) Stipe Brnas
MF	8	(Croatia) Zlatko Lučan
FW	9	(Croatia) Ivan Cvjetković		(substituted off) 75'
FW	10	(Croatia) Igor Čalo
MF	11	(Croatia) Nikica Miletić		(substituted off) 64'
Substitutes:
FW	?	(Croatia) Franjo Kučko		(substituted on) 64'
MF	?	(Croatia) Vjekoslav Knez		(substituted on) 75'
Manager:
(Croatia) Ilija Lončarević

HAŠK GRAĐANSKI:
GK	1	(Croatia) Dražen Ladić	(yellow card) 1'
FW	2	(Croatia) Goran Geršak		(substituted off) 78'
MF	3	(Croatia) Josip Gašpar		(substituted off) 67'
DF	4	(Croatia) Zoran Mamić
DF	5	(Croatia) Saša Peršon
DF	6	(Croatia) Slavko Ištvanić
MF	7	(Slovenia) Gregor Židan	(yellow card) 49'
MF	8	(Croatia) Željko Adžić
FW	9	(Croatia) Goran Vlaović
MF	10	(Croatia) Ivica Duspara
FW	11	(Croatia) Alen Peternac
Substitutes:
DF	?	(Croatia) Andrej Panadić		(substituted on) 67'
MF	?	(Croatia) Miljenko Kovačić		(substituted on) 78'
Manager:
(Croatia) Vlatko Marković

== Second leg ==
23 June 1992
20:15

HAŠK Građanski	0–1	Inker Zaprešić
	Report	Kasumović 18'

Stadion Maksimir, Zagreb
Attendance: 25,000
Referee: Ivan Vranaričić (Đakovo)

HAŠK GRAĐANSKI:
GK	1	(Croatia) Dražen Ladić
FW	2	(Croatia) Goran Geršak
MF	3	(Croatia) Josip Gašpar	(yellow card) 35'
DF	4	(Croatia) Zoran Mamić
DF	5	(Croatia) Saša Peršon	(yellow card) 30'
DF	6	(Croatia) Slavko Ištvanić
MF	7	(Slovenia) Gregor Židan		(substituted off) 57'
MF	8	(Croatia) Željko Adžić
FW	9	(Croatia) Goran Vlaović
MF	10	(Croatia) Ivica Duspara
FW	11	(Croatia) Alen Peternac		(substituted off) 78'
Substitutes:
MF	?	(Croatia) Miljenko Kovačić		(substituted on) 57'
MF	?	(Croatia) Željko Šoić		(substituted on) 78'
Manager:
(Croatia) Vlatko Marković

INKER ZAPREŠIĆ:
GK	1	(Croatia) Krešimir Bronić
DF	2	(Croatia) Ivica Antolić		(substituted off) 80'
DF	3	(Croatia) Zoran Živković
DF	4	(Croatia) Damir Kasumović (c)	(yellow card) 85'
MF	5	(Croatia) Zvonimir Soldo
MF	6	(Croatia) Miroslav Šorgić	(yellow card) 67'
MF	7	(Croatia) Krunoslav Jurčić
MF	8	(Croatia) Borimir Perković
DF	9	(Croatia) Stipe Brnas
FW	10	(Croatia) Igor Čalo	(yellow card) 85'
MF	11	(Croatia) Nikica Miletić	(yellow card) 21'
Substitutes:
GK	12	(Croatia) Željko Rumbak
DF	13	(Croatia) Boris Pavić
FW	14	(Croatia) Franjo Kučko		(substituted on) 80'
MF	15	(Croatia) Josip Omrčen-Čeko
MF	16	(Croatia) Vjekoslav Knez
Manager:
(Croatia) Ilija Lončarević
