= 2002 Croatian Football Cup final =

- Event: 2001–02 Croatian Cup
Dinamo Zagreb	Varteks
2	1

First leg
Dinamo Zagreb	Varteks
1	1
- Date: 24 April 2002
- Venue: Stadion Maksimir, Zagreb
- Referee: Draženko Kovačić (Križevci)
- Attendance: 5,000

Second leg
Varteks	Dinamo Zagreb
0	1
- Date: 1 May 2002
- Venue: Stadion Varteks, Varaždin
- Referee: Edo Trivković (Split)
- Attendance: 8,000

The 2002 Croatian Cup final was a two-legged affair played between Dinamo Zagreb and Varteks. The first leg was played in Zagreb on 24 April 2002, while the second leg on 1 May 2002 in Varaždin.

Dinamo Zagreb won the trophy with an aggregate result of 2–1.

== Road to the final ==
Dinamo Zagreb		Round	Varteks	
Opponent	Result		Opponent	Result
Željezničar Slavonski Brod	3–0	First round	Ivančica Ivanec	3–1
Kamen Ingrad	4–1	Second round	Belišće	5–0
Rijeka	1–0	Quarter-finals	Hajduk Split	3–1
Rijeka	1–0	Quarter-finals	Hajduk Split	1–2
Osijek	1–2	Semi-finals	Pomorac	0–1
Osijek	2–0	Semi-finals	Pomorac	2–0

== First leg ==
24 April 2002
17:30

Dinamo Zagreb	1–1	Varteks
Sedloski 47'	Report (in Croatian)	Halilović 22'

Stadion Maksimir, Zagreb
Attendance: 5,000
Referee: Draženko Kovačić (Križevci)

DINAMO ZAGREB:
GK	(Croatia) Tomislav Butina
(Croatia) Spomenko Bošnjak
(North Macedonia) Goce Sedloski
(Croatia) Kristijan Polovanec
(Croatia) Ivan Ćosić	(substituted off) 29'
(Croatia) Damir Krznar
(Croatia) Jerko Leko	(substituted off) 46'
(Croatia) Jasmin Agić
(Croatia) Vladimir Petrović
(Croatia) Silvio Marić
(Bosnia and Herzegovina) Enes Mešanović
Substitutes:
(Croatia) Mihael Mikić	(substituted on) 29'
(Croatia) Dario Zahora	(substituted on) 46'
Manager:
(Croatia) Marijan Vlak

VARTEKS:
GK	(Croatia) Danijel Mađarić
(Croatia) Goran Granić
(Croatia) Matija Kristić
(Croatia) Ivan Režić
(Croatia) Silvestar Sabolčki
(Croatia) Danijel Hrman
(Croatia) Hrvoje Sklepić	(substituted off) 75'
(Croatia) Zoran Kastel
(Croatia) Miljenko Mumlek	(substituted off) 90'
(Slovenia) Oskar Drobne	(substituted off) 64'
(Croatia) Nedim Halilović
Substitutes:
(Albania) Devis Mukaj	(substituted on) 64'
(Croatia) Andrija Balajić	(substituted on) 90'
(Croatia) Nikola Šafarić	(substituted on) 75'
Manager:
(Croatia) Branko Janžek

== Second leg ==
1 May 2002
17:30

Varteks	0–1	Dinamo Zagreb
	Report (in Croatian)	Leko 32'

Stadion Varteks, Varaždin
Attendance: 8,000
Referee: Edo Trivković (Split)

VARTEKS:
GK	(Croatia) Danijel Mađarić
(Croatia) Goran Granić
(Croatia) Ivan Režić
(Croatia) Zoran Ivančić	Booked
(Croatia) Silvestar Sabolčki	(substituted off) 54'
(Albania) Devis Mukaj	(substituted off) 21'
(Croatia) Danijel Hrman
(Croatia) Zoran Kastel
(Croatia) Miljenko Mumlek	Booked
(Slovenia) Oskar Drobne	Booked
(Croatia) Veldin Karić	Booked
Substitutes:
(Croatia) Hrvoje Sklepić	(substituted on) 21'	(substituted off) 75'
(Croatia) Antun Andričević	(yellow card)	(substituted on) 54'
(Croatia) Nedim Halilović	(substituted on) 75'
Manager:
(Croatia) Branko Janžek

DINAMO ZAGREB:
GK	(Croatia) Tomislav Butina
(Croatia) Spomenko Bošnjak	Booked
(North Macedonia) Goce Sedloski	Booked
(Croatia) Kristijan Polovanec
(Croatia) Mihael Mikić
(Croatia) Jerko Leko	Booked
(Croatia) Jasmin Agić
(Croatia) Damir Krznar	Booked
(Croatia) Vladimir Petrović	Booked
(Croatia) Silvio Marić	(substituted off) 77'
(Bosnia and Herzegovina) Enes Mešanović	(substituted off) 56'
Substitutes:
(Croatia) Dario Zahora	(yellow card)	(substituted on) 56'	(substituted off) 88'
(Croatia) Dino Drpić	(substituted on) 77'
(Croatia) Niko Kranjčar	(substituted on) 88'
Manager:
(Croatia) Marijan Vlak
