= 1991–92 HNK Hajduk Split season =

Hajduk Split
1991–92 season
- Chairman: Stjepan Jukić Peladić
- Manager: Stanko Poklepović
- Prva HNL: 1st
- Croatian Cup: Quarter-finals
- Cup Winners' Cup: First round
- Top goalscorer: League: Ardian Kozniku (12); All: Ardian Kozniku (12)
- Highest home attendance: 20,000 vs HAŠK Građanski (9 May 1992)
- Lowest home attendance: 3,000 (Two matches)
- Average home league attendance: 6,955

The 1991–92 season was the 81st season in Hajduk Split’s history and their first in the Prva HNL.

In autumn 1991, Hajduk was played only European and friendly matches, as the domestic competitions were postponed to the spring 1992 due to the Croatian War of Independence.

== Competitions ==
=== Overall record ===
Performance by competition
Competition	Starting round	Final position/round	First match	Last match
Prva HNL	—	Winners	29 February 1992	13 June 1992
Croatian Football Cup	Quarter-final		24 March 1992	7 April 1992
Cup Winners' Cup	First round		17 September 1991	2 October 1991

Statistics by competition
Competition	Pld	W	D	L	GF	GA	GD	Win%
Prva HNL	22	16	4	2	44	14	+30	72.73
Croatian Football Cup	2	0	2	0	1	1	+0	0.00
Cup Winners' Cup	2	1	0	1	1	2	−1	50.00
Total	26	17	6	3	46	17	+29	65.38

=== Prva HNL ===
==== Classification ====
Pos	Team	Pld	W	D	L	GF	GA	GD	Pts
1	Hajduk Split (C)	22	16	4	2	44	14	+30	36
2	NK Zagreb	22	14	5	3	34	9	+25	33
3	Osijek	22	12	3	7	33	28	+5	27
4	Inker Zaprešić	22	10	6	6	37	19	+18	26 (Note: Head-to-head record: Inker Zaprešić–HAŠK Građanski 2−1, HAŠK Građanski–Inker Zaprešić 0−2.)
5	HAŠK Građanski	22	11	4	7	32	21	+11	26

Source: RSSSF.org
Rules for classification: 1st points; 2nd head-to-head points.
(C) Champions

==== Results summary ====
Overall								Home						Away					
Pld	W	D	L	GF	GA	GD	Pts	W	D	L	GF	GA	GD	W	D	L	GF	GA	GD
22	16	4	2	44	13	+31	52	8	2	1	26	4	+22	8	2	1	18	9	+9

Last updated: 13 June 1992.
Source: Sportnet.hr

==== Results by round ====
Round	1	2	3	4	5	6	7	8	9	10	11	12	13	14	15	16	17	18	19	20	21	22
Ground	H	A	H	A	H	H	A	H	A	H	A	A	H	A	H	A	A	H	A	H	A	H
Result	W	W	W	W	W	W	D	L	W	W	W	W	D	W	D	W	W	W	D	W	L	W
Position	1	2	1	1	1	1	1	1	1	1	1	1	1	1	1	1	1	1	1	1	1	1

Source: Competitive matches
A = Away; H = Home; W = Win; D = Draw; L = Loss

==== Results by opponent ====
Team	Results		Points
Team	1	2	Points
Cibalia	2–0	1–1	4
Dubrovnik	9–0	1–0	6
HAŠK Građanski	2–1	0–0	4
Inker Zaprešić	0–2	0–0	1
Istra	3–1	1–0	6
Osijek	3–3	2–0	4
Rijeka	3–0	2–0	4
Segesta	3–0	1–1	4
Šibenik	3–2	4–1	6
Varteks	1–0	1–0	6
Zadar	2–0	3–0	6
NK Zagreb	1–0	0–3	3

Source: 1992 Croatian First Football League article

== Matches ==
=== Prva HNL ===
Round	Date	Venue	Opponent	Score	Attendance	Hajduk Scorers	Report
1	29 Feb	H	Istra	3 – 1	5,000	Kozniku (2), Mornar	HRnogomet.com
2	7 Mar	AR	Cibalia	2 – 0	4,000	Mornar, Miše	HRnogomet.com
3	10 Mar	H	Dubrovnik	9 – 0	4,000	Španjić, Bilić, Vučević, Mornar (3), Kozniku, Vladislavić, Miše (2)	HRnogomet.com
4	14 Mar	A	HAŠK Građanski	2 – 1	15,000	Miše, Kozniku	HRnogomet.com
5	17 Mar	H	Zadar	2 – 0	5,000	Vučević, Kozniku	HRnogomet.com
6	21 Mar	H	Rijeka	3 – 0	10,000	Kozniku, Vučević (2)	HRnogomet.com
7	28 Mar	AR	Osijek	3 – 3	5,000	Vučević, Kozniku, Mornar	HRnogomet.com
8	31 Mar	H	Inker Zaprešić	0 – 2	7,000		HRnogomet.com
9	4 Apr	A	Varteks	1 – 0	10,000	Miše	HRnogomet.com
10	11 Apr	H	NK Zagreb	1 – 0	6,000	Kozniku	Slobodna Dalmacija
11	15 Apr	AR	Šibenik	3 – 2	4,000	Jeličić (2), Novaković	HRnogomet.com
12	25 Apr	A	Istra	1 – 0	6,000	Vučević	HRnogomet.com
13	2 May	H	Cibalia	1 – 1	3,000	Vukas	Slobodna Dalmacija
14	5 May	AR	Dubrovnik	1 – 0	1,500	Kozniku	HRnogomet.com
15	9 May	H	HAŠK Građanski	0 – 0	20,000		HRnogomet.com
16	12 May	AR	Zadar	3 – 0	3,000	Mornar (2), Vučević	HRnogomet.com
17	16 May	A	Rijeka	2 – 0	6,000	Kozniku, Jeličić	HRnogomet.com
18	23 May	H	Osijek	2 – 0	3,500	Erceg, Jeličić	HRnogomet.com
19	26 May	A	Inker Zaprešić	0 – 0	10,000		HRnogomet.com
20	31 May	H	Varteks	1 – 0	3,000	Vučević	Slobodna Dalmacija
21	6 Jun	A	NK Zagreb	0 – 3	12,000		HRnogomet.com
22	13 Jun	H	Šibenik	4 – 1	10,000	Mornar, Abazi, Kozniku (2)	HRnogomet.com

Source: hajduk.hr

=== Croatian Football Cup ===
Round	Date	Venue	Opponent	Score	Attendance	Hajduk Scorers	Report
QF	24 Mar	A	Rijeka	0 – 0	3,000		HRnogomet.com
QF	7 Apr	H	Rijeka	1 – 1	8,000	Jeličić	HRnogomet.com

Source: hajduk.hr

=== Cup Winners' Cup ===
Round	Date	Venue	Opponent	Score	Attendance	Hajduk Scorers	Report
R1	17 Sep	HR (Austria)	Tottenham Hotspur (England)	1 – 0	7,000	Novaković	worldfootball.net
R1	2 Oct	A (England)	Tottenham Hotspur (England)	0 – 2	24,297		worldfootball.net

Source: hajduk.hr

== Player seasonal records ==
=== Top scorers ===
Rank	Name	League	Europe	Cup	Total
1	(Croatia) Ardian Kozniku	12	–	–	12
2	(Croatia) Goran Vučević	8	–	–	8
3	(Croatia) Ivica Mornar	7	–	–	7
4	(Croatia) Ante Miše	8	–	–	6
5	(Croatia) Joško Jeličić	4	–	1	5
6	(Croatia) Mario Novaković	1	1	–	2
7	(Albania) Eduard Abazi	1	–	–	1
7	(Croatia) Slaven Bilić	1	–	–	1
7	(Croatia) Tomislav Erceg	1	–	–	1
7	(Croatia) Joško Španjić	1	–	–	1
7	(Croatia) Robert Vladislavić	1	–	–	1
7	(Croatia) Hari Vukas	1	–	–	1
	TOTALS	44	1	1	46

Source: Competitive matches

== See also ==
- 1992 Croatian First Football League
- 1992 Croatian Football Cup

== External sources ==
- 1992 Prva HNL at HRnogomet.com
- 1992 Croatian Cup at HRnogomet.com
- 1991–92 European Cup Winners' Cup at rsssf.com
