= Croatian Football Cup =

Hrvatski nogometni kup
- Founded: 1992
- Region: Croatia
- Teams: 48
- Qualifier for: UEFA Europa League
- Current champions: Dinamo Zagreb (18th title)
- Most championships: Dinamo Zagreb (18 titles)
- Broadcaster: MAX Sport
- Website: Official website
- 2026–27 Croatian Football Cup

The Croatian Football Cup (Croatian: Hrvatski nogometni kup), also metonymically referred to as Rabuzin's Sun (Croatian: Rabuzinovo sunce) after its trophy named after Ivan Rabuzin, is an annually held football tournament for Croatian football clubs and is the second most important competition in Croatian football after the HNL championship. It is governed by the Croatian Football Federation (HNS) and usually runs from late August to late May. Cup winners automatically qualify for next season's UEFA Europa League, except when cup winners are also Prva HNL champions, in which case their berth in the Europa Conference League goes to the best-placed team in the Prva HNL who have not qualified for the UEFA competitions through their league performance.

The cup was established in 1992, after Croatian clubs had abandoned the Yugoslav First League and Yugoslav Cup competitions following the breakup of Yugoslavia. As of the most recent 2021–22 season a total of 31 cup seasons were held. The competition has historically been dominated by the two Eternal Derby sides—the most successful club is Dinamo Zagreb (formerly known in the 1990s as HAŠK Građanski and Croatia Zagreb) who appeared in 23 finals and won 16 titles, followed by Hajduk Split who won 8 titles out of 13 finals they appeared in.

Either Dinamo or Hajduk appeared in all but four cup finals (in 1999, 2006, 2020 and 2025) and only three other clubs have won the cup—Rijeka (seven wins), Inter Zaprešić (one win) and Osijek (one win). Although clubs can qualify for the cup via regional county cups, which are usually contested by second-, third- or fourth-level sides, Uljanik Pula in 2003 was the only team in the history of the competition to have reached the cup final from outside the top level.

== Format ==
=== Entries ===
Although in theory any club can take part in the cup, 48 teams enter the competition proper, based on three criteria:

1. Top sixteen best-ranked teams according to club coefficient calculated by the Croatian Football Federation which take into account their cup records in the previous five seasons
2. Twenty-one club winners of regional cups organised in each of 21 counties of Croatia
3. Eleven regional cup finalists, from the top 11 counties with the greatest number of active football clubs registered

=== Competition system ===
The 32 clubs which qualify via regional cups always enter in the preliminary round, which consists of 16 single-legged fixtures. In case of a draw at the end of normal time, thirty minutes of extra time is played, and if scores are still level, a penalty shootout is held to determine the winner of the tie. Sixteen winners of the preliminary ties go on to the first round proper (round of 32), where they are joined by the sixteen best-ranked clubs according to cup coefficient (this usually means all First League clubs and a handful of best-ranked lower level teams). Round of 32 (R1) and round of 16 (R2) are also played as single-legged fixtures. Until the 2014–15 season, from the quarter-finals onward, the competition employed a two-legged tie format, with winners progressing through on aggregate score. Since 2015–16, quarter-finals are also played as single-legged fixtures and, since 2017–18, the same applies for semi-finals. In case the score is still level at the end of regular time, extra time is played. If the score remains level after extra time, a penalty shootout takes place to determine tie winners. With the exception of 1997 and 1999 finals, all finals were also played as two-legged fixtures until the rules were most recently changed for the 2014–15 season and a single-match final was made permanent.

=== Croatian club cup coefficient ===
Clubs are awarded points for participation in specific round of the Cup. There are two exceptions in awarding points, first is clubs from preliminary round doesn't receive any points and second is a final where winner receives double of runner up. Points are summed through the season and added to five year ranking.

Round	Awarded clubs	Points	Accumulative
Preliminary round	16	0	0
First round	16	1	1
Second round	8	2	3
Quarter-finals	4	4	7
Semi-finals	2	8	15
Runner up	1	16	31
Winner	1	32	63

Points used in this ranking will be used for qualification for the 2027–28 season and seeding for the season 2026–27.

Rank	Club	2021−22	2022–23	2023−24	2024–25	2025–26	Total
1	Rijeka	31	3	31	63	31	159
2	Dinamo Zagreb	7	15	63	7	63	155
3	Hajduk Split	63	63	15	7	7	155
4	Slaven Belupo	7	15	3	31	15	71
5	Gorica	15	3	7	7	15	47
6	Osijek	15	7	7	15	3	47
7	Lokomotiva	7	7	15	7	7	43
8	Šibenik	3	31	1	3	1	39
9	Istra 1961	7	3	3	15	3	31
10	Varaždin	3	3	7	3	7	23
11	Rudeš	3	7	7	3	3	23
12	BSK Bijelo Brdo	3	7	1	1	3	15
13	Mladost Ždralovi	3	3		3	3	12
14	Oriolik	3	1	3	1	1	9
15	Cibalia	1	1	3		3	8
16	Karlovac 1919	1		3		3	7
17	Bjelovar	1	3		3		7
18	Belišće	3	1	1	1	1	7
19	Kurilovec					7	7
20	Bednja	1	1		3		5
21	Jaska Vinogradar	1	1	1	1		4
22	Split	1	3				4
23	Dugopolje	1			3		4
24	Vukovar 1991			3		1	4
25	Radnik Križevci			3		1	4
26	Slavonija Požega				3	1	4
27	Varteks				1	3	4
28	Rudar Labin	3					3
29	Jadran LP			3			3
30	Nedelišće		3				3
31	Jadran Poreč		1	1	1		3
32	Zagreb	1		1			2
33	Inter Zaprešić (defunct)	1	1				2
34	Primorac Biograd	1	1				2
35	Papuk Orahovica		1	1			2
36	Moslavina		1	1			2
37	Pitomača	1			1		2
38	Gaj Mače				1	1	2
39	Libertas Novska			1		1	2
40	Dugo Selo			1		1	2
41	Solin		1			1	2
42	Sesvete	1					1
43	Croatia Zmijavci			1			1
44	Bilogora 91				1		1
45	Vuteks Sloga	1					1
46	Zagora Unešić			1			1
47	Omladinac			1			1
48	Ponikve			1			1
49	Kutjevo			1			1
50	Zagorec			1			1
51	Bistra		1				1
52	Tehničar Cvetkovec		1				1
53	Borinci		1				1
54	Grobničan		1				1
55	Dubrava		1				1
56	Nehaj	1					1
57	Međimurje	1					1
58	Orijent 1919	1					1
59	Dinamo Predavac					1	1
60	Maksimir					1	1
61	Koprivnica					1	1
62	Graničar Kotoriba					1	1
63	Neretva					1	1
64	Uljanik Pula					1	1
65	Samobor				1		1
66	Neretvanac Opuzen				1		1
67	Banjole				1		1
68	Đakovo Croatia				1		1
69	Tomislav Donji Andrijevci				1		1
70	Kustošija				1		1
71	Zrinski Osječko 1664				1		1

Seeding for 2026−27 Cup

== List of winners ==
=== Key ===
(R)	Replay
	Two-legged tie
*	Match went to extra time
†	Match decided by a penalty shoot-out (from 2015 after extra time)
‡	Winning team won The Double
Italics	Team from outside the top level of Croatian football

=== List of winners ===
Season	Winners	Score	Runners–up	Venue(s)
1992	Inker Zaprešić (1)	2–1	HAŠK Građanski	Stadion ŠRC Zaprešić; Stadion Maksimir
1992–93	Hajduk Split (1)	5–3	Croatia Zagreb	Stadion Poljud; Stadion Maksimir
1993–94	Croatia Zagreb (1)	2–1	Rijeka	Stadion Maksimir; Stadion Kantrida
1994–95	Hajduk Split (2) ‡	4–2	Croatia Zagreb	Stadion Poljud; Stadion Maksimir
1995–96	Croatia Zagreb (2) ‡	3–0	Varteks	Stadion Varteks; Stadion Maksimir
1996–97	Croatia Zagreb (3) ‡	2–1	NK Zagreb	Stadion Maksimir
1997–98	Croatia Zagreb (4) ‡	3–1	Varteks	Stadion Varteks; Stadion Maksimir
1998–99	Osijek (1)	2–1 *	Cibalia	Stadion Maksimir
1999–2000	Hajduk Split (3)	2–1	Dinamo Zagreb	Stadion Poljud; Stadion Maksimir
2000–01	Dinamo Zagreb (5)	3–0	Hajduk Split	Stadion Poljud; Stadion Maksimir
2001–02	Dinamo Zagreb (6)	2–1	Varteks	Stadion Maksimir; Stadion Varteks
2002–03	Hajduk Split (4)	5–0	Uljanik Pula	Stadion Aldo Drosina; Stadion Poljud
2003–04	Dinamo Zagreb (7)	1–1 (a)	Varteks	Stadion Varteks; Stadion Maksimir
2004–05	Rijeka (1)	3–1	Hajduk Split	Stadion Kantrida; Stadion Poljud
2005–06	Rijeka (2)	5–5 (a)	Varteks	Stadion Kantrida; Stadion Varteks
2006–07	Dinamo Zagreb (8) ‡	2–1	Slaven Belupo	Stadion Maksimir; Gradski stadion (Koprivnica)
2007–08	Dinamo Zagreb (9) ‡	3–0	Hajduk Split	Stadion Maksimir; Stadion Poljud
2008–09	Dinamo Zagreb (10) ‡	3–3 (4–3 p) †	Hajduk Split	Stadion Maksimir; Stadion Poljud
2009–10	Hajduk Split (5)	4–1	Šibenik	Stadion Poljud; Stadion Šubićevac
2010–11	Dinamo Zagreb (11) ‡	8–2	Varaždin	Stadion Maksimir; Stadion Varteks
2011–12	Dinamo Zagreb (12) ‡	3–1	Osijek	Stadion Gradski vrt; Stadion Maksimir
2012–13	Hajduk Split (6)	5–4	Lokomotiva	Stadion Poljud; Stadion Maksimir
2013–14	Rijeka (3)	3–0	Dinamo Zagreb	Stadion Maksimir; Stadion Kantrida
2014−15	Dinamo Zagreb (13) ‡	0–0 (4–2 p) †	RNK Split	Stadion Maksimir
2015–16	Dinamo Zagreb (14) ‡	2–1	Slaven Belupo	Stadion Gradski vrt
2016–17	Rijeka ‡ (4)	3–1	Dinamo Zagreb	Stadion Varteks
2017–18	Dinamo Zagreb (15) ‡	1–0	Hajduk Split	Stadion HNK Cibalia
2018–19	Rijeka (5)	3–1	Dinamo Zagreb	Stadion Aldo Drosina
2019–20	Rijeka (6)	1–0	Lokomotiva	Stadion Šubićevac
2020–21	Dinamo Zagreb (16) ‡	6–3	Istra 1961	Gradski stadion Velika Gorica
2021–22	Hajduk Split (7)	3–1	Rijeka	Stadion Poljud
2022–23	Hajduk Split (8)	2–0	Šibenik	Stadion Rujevica
2023–24	Dinamo Zagreb (17) ‡	3–1	Rijeka	Stadion Maksimir; Stadion Rujevica
2024–25	Rijeka (7) ‡	2–1	Slaven Belupo	Gradski stadion (Koprivnica); Stadion Rujevica
2025–26	Dinamo Zagreb (18) ‡	2−0	Rijeka	Opus Arena

== Results by team ==
Club	Winners	Last final won	Runners-up	Last final lost
Dinamo Zagreb^{[A]}	18	2026	7	2019
Hajduk Split	8	2023	5	2018
Rijeka	7	2025	4	2026
Osijek	1	1999	1	2012
Inter Zaprešić^{[B]}	1	1992	0	—
Varaždin^{[C]}	0	—	6	2011
Slaven Belupo^{[E]}	0	—	3	2025
Lokomotiva	0	—	2	2020
Istra 1961^{[D]}	0	—	2	2021
Šibenik	0	—	2	2023
NK Zagreb	0	—	1	1997
Cibalia	0	—	1	1999
RNK Split	0	—	1	2015

== Winning managers ==
Final	Winning manager	Winning club	Losing manager	Losing club
1992	Ilija Lončarević	Inker Zaprešić	Vlatko Marković	HAŠK Građanski
1993	Ivan Katalinić	Hajduk Split	Miroslav Blažević	Croatia Zagreb
1994	Miroslav Blažević	Croatia Zagreb	Srećko Juričić	Rijeka
1995	Ivan Katalinić	Hajduk Split	Zlatko Kranjčar	Croatia Zagreb
1996	Zlatko Kranjčar	Croatia Zagreb	Luka Bonačić	Varteks
1997	Otto Barić	Croatia Zagreb	Krešimir Ganjto	NK Zagreb
1998	Zlatko Kranjčar	Croatia Zagreb	Dražen Besek	Varteks
1999	Stanko Poklepović	Osijek	Srećko Lušić	Cibalia
2000	Petar Nadoveza	Hajduk Split	Marijan Vlak	Dinamo Zagreb
2001	Ilija Lončarević	Dinamo Zagreb	Zoran Vulić	Hajduk Split
2002	Marijan Vlak	Dinamo Zagreb	Branko Janžek	Varteks
2003	Zoran Vulić	Hajduk Split	Elvis Scoria	Uljanik Pula
2004	Nikola Jurčević	Dinamo Zagreb	Miroslav Blažević	Varteks
2005	Elvis Scoria	Rijeka	Igor Štimac	Hajduk Split
2006	Dragan Skočić	Rijeka	Zlatko Dalić	Varteks
2007	Branko Ivanković	Dinamo Zagreb	Elvis Scoria	Slaven Belupo
2008	Zvonimir Soldo	Dinamo Zagreb	Robert Jarni	Hajduk Split
2009	Krunoslav Jurčić	Dinamo Zagreb	Ante Miše	Hajduk Split
2010	Stanko Poklepović	Hajduk Split	Branko Karačić	Šibenik
2011	Marijo Tot^{[F]}	Dinamo Zagreb	Samir Toplak	Varaždin
2012	Ante Čačić	Dinamo Zagreb	Stanko Mršić	Osijek
2013	Igor Tudor	Hajduk Split	Tomislav Ivković	Lokomotiva
2014	Matjaž Kek	Rijeka	Zoran Mamić	Dinamo Zagreb
2015	Zoran Mamić	Dinamo Zagreb	Zoran Vulić	RNK Split
2016	Zoran Mamić	Dinamo Zagreb	Željko Kopić	Slaven Belupo
2017	Matjaž Kek	Rijeka	Ivaylo Petev	Dinamo Zagreb
2018	Nenad Bjelica	Dinamo Zagreb	Željko Kopić	Hajduk Split
2019	Igor Bišćan	Rijeka	Nenad Bjelica	Dinamo Zagreb
2020	Simon Rožman	Rijeka	Goran Tomić	Lokomotiva
2021	Damir Krznar	Dinamo Zagreb	Danijel Jumić	Istra 1961
2022	Valdas Dambrauskas	Hajduk Split	Goran Tomić	Rijeka
2023	Ivan Leko	Hajduk Split	Damir Canadi	Šibenik
2024	Sergej Jakirović	Dinamo Zagreb	Željko Sopić	Rijeka
2025	Radomir Đalović	Rijeka	Mario Kovačević	Slaven Belupo

=== By individual ===
Rank	Name	Winners	Club(s)	Winning years
1	(Croatia) Ivan Katalinić	2	Hajduk Split	1993, 1995
1	(Croatia) Zlatko Kranjčar	2	Croatia Zagreb	1996, 1998
1	(Croatia) Ilija Lončarević	2	Inker Zaprešić, Dinamo Zagreb	1992, 2001
1	(Croatia) Stanko Poklepović	2	Osijek, Hajduk Split	1999, 2010
1	(Croatia) Zoran Mamić	2	Dinamo Zagreb	2015, 2016
1	(Slovenia) Matjaž Kek	2	Rijeka	2014, 2017

== Footnotes ==
A. Originally called Dinamo Zagreb, the club was renamed "HAŠK Građanski" in 1992, and then again "Croatia Zagreb" in the winter break of the 1992–93 season. The club reverted to its original name in February 2000.
B. Inter Zaprešić was known by its sponsored name "Inker Zaprešić" (sometimes spelled "INKER") from 1991 to 2003.
C. Varaždin were known as "Varteks" from 1958 to 2010.
D. Istra 1961 was formerly known as "Uljanik Pula" (before 2003), "Pula 1856" (2003–05), "Pula Staro Češko" (2005–06), and "NK Pula" (2006–07) before adopting their current name in 2007. They are not to be confused with their cross-city rivals NK Istra.
E. Slaven Belupo based in Koprivnica were formerly known as "Slaven" until 1992. From 1992 to 1994 they were called "Slaven Bilokalnik" before adopting their current name for sponsorship reasons. Since UEFA does not approve sponsored club names, the club is listed as "Slaven Koprivnica" in European competitions and on UEFA's website.
F. Vahid Halilhodžić was in charge of Dinamo Zagreb in the first leg of 2011 Croatian Football Cup Final.
