= 1997–98 Croatian Football Cup =

Tournament details
- Country: Croatia
- Teams: 32

Final positions
- Champions: Croatia Zagreb (4th title)
- Runners-up: Varteks

Tournament statistics
- Matches played: 38
- Goals scored: 114 (3 per match)
- Top goal scorer: Vladimir Petrović (7)

The 1997–98 Croatian Football Cup was the seventh edition of Croatia's football knockout competition. Croatia Zagreb were the defending champions, and they won their third successive title.

== Calendar ==
Round	Main date	Number of fixtures	Clubs	New entries this round
First round	5 and 6 August 1997	16	32 → 16	None
Second round	9 and 24 September 1997	8	16 → 8	None
Quarter-finals	First legs 14 and 26 October 1997, Second legs 22 October 1997	8	8 → 4	None
Semi-finals	First legs 1 April 1998, Second legs 15 April 1998	4	4 → 2	None
Final	First leg 6 May, Second leg 14 May 1998	2	2 → 1	None

== First round ==
Tie no	Home team	Score	Away team
1	Slavonac	1–5	Croatia Zagreb
2	Samobor	0–1	NK Zagreb
3	Olimpija Osijek	0–3	Rijeka
4	Jadran Poreč	2–1	Segesta
5	Orijent	2–1	Cibalia
6	RNK Split	2–1	Marsonia
7	Varaždin	1–2	Varteks
8	Slaven Belupo	2–0	Belišće
9	PIK Vrbovec	1–4	Zadarkomerc
10	Špansko	3–1	Bjelovar
11	Budućnost Hodošan	2–1	Šibenik
12	Dilj	1–0	Inker Zaprešić
13	Badel Sesvete	1–0	Dubrovnik
14	Slavonija Požega	1–2	Croatia Đakovo
15	Posedarje	1–3	Hajduk Split
16	Mladost 127	2–2 (aet) (5–4 p)	Osijek

== Second round ==
Tie no	Home team	Score	Away team
1	Budućnost Hodošan	1–2	NK Zagreb
2	Dilj	2–1	RNK Split
3	Croatia Đakovo	0–0 (aet) (2–4 p)	Varteks
4	Badel Sesvete	2–1	Zadarkomerc
5	Rijeka	0–2	Orijent
6	Jadran Poreč	0–1	Mladost 127
7	Croatia Zagreb	11–0	Špansko
8	Hajduk Split	3–1	Slaven Belupo

== Quarter-finals ==
Team 1	Agg.	Team 2	1st leg	2nd leg
Dilj	4–8	NK Zagreb	2–5	2–3
Orijent	0–0 (0–3 p)	Varteks	0–0	0–0
Badel Sesvete	2–5	Croatia Zagreb	1–1	1–4
Hajduk Split	3–1	Mladost 127	2–1	1–0

== Semi-finals ==
1 April 1998
16:30

Croatia Zagreb	4–0	NK Zagreb
Marić 14'; Viduka 45' (pen.), 53' (pen.); Muñoz 65'	Report

Stadion Maksimir, Zagreb
Attendance: 1,000
Referee: Ivan Novak (Varaždin)
15 April 1998
16:30

NK Zagreb	0–3	Croatia Zagreb
	Report	Jurčić 20'; Prosinečki 65'; Petrović 90'

Stadion Kranjčevićeva, Zagreb
Attendance: 2,000
Referee: Reno Sinovčić (Zadar)

Croatia Zagreb won 7–0 on aggregate.

1 April 1998
16:30

Varteks	2–1	Hajduk Split
Karić 34'; Hrman 39'	Report	Mladenović 45'

Stadion Varteks, Varaždin
Attendance: 6,000
Referee: Miro Marijanović (Osijek)
15 April 1998
18:00

Hajduk Split	0–1	Varteks
	Report	Topić 90'

Stadion Poljud, Split
Attendance: 7,000
Referee: Željko Širić (Osijek)

Varteks won 3–1 on aggregate.

== Final ==
=== First leg ===
6 May 1998

Varteks	0–1	Croatia Zagreb
	Report	Mikić 82'

Stadion Varteks, Varaždin
Attendance: 7,000
Referee: Miroslav Vitković (Vinkovci)

=== Second leg ===
14 May 1998

Croatia Zagreb	2–1	Varteks
Viduka 52'; Marić 83'	Report	Topić 38'

Stadion Maksimir, Zagreb
Attendance: 15,000
Referee: Edo Trivković (Split)

Croatia Zagreb won 3–1 on aggregate.

== See also ==
- 1997–98 Croatian First Football League
