= 1992–93 Croatian Football Cup =

Tournament details
- Country: Croatia
- Teams: 32

Final positions
- Champions: Hajduk Split (1st title)
- Runners-up: Croatia Zagreb

Tournament statistics
- Matches played: 62
- Goals scored: 210 (3.39 per match)
- Top goal scorer: Goran Vlaović (13)

The 1992–93 Croatian Football Cup was the second season of Croatia's football knockout competition. Inter Zaprešić were the defending champions.

== Calendar ==
Round	Main date	Number of fixtures	Clubs	New entries this round
First round	First legs 22 and 23 September 1992, Second legs 6 and 7 October 1992	32	32 → 16	None
Second round	First legs 17 and 18 November 1992, Second legs 5 and 6 December 1992	16	16 → 8	None
Quarter-finals	First legs 24 and 31 March 1993, Second legs 6 and 7 April 1993	8	8 → 4	None
Semi-finals	First legs 21 April 1993, Second legs 5 May 1993	4	4 → 2	None
Final	First leg 19 May 1993, Second leg 2 June 1993	2	2 → 1	None

== First round ==
Team 1	Agg.	Team 2	1st leg	2nd leg
Križevci	0–3	Šibenik	0–0	0–3
Hajduk Split	4–3	RNK Split	0–3	4–0
Primorac Biograd na Moru	3–3 (1–3 p)	Kraljevica	2–1	1–2
Rudeš	0–14	HAŠK Građanski	0–1	0–13
Croatia Đakovo	2–4	Slavonija Požega	2–0	0–4
Marsonia	8–0	Mladost Pounje	4–0	4–0
Neretva	0–2	Dubrovnik	0–0	0–2
Varteks	2–2 (4–3 p)	Graničar	2–0	0–2
Rijeka	4–3	Segesta	2–2	2–1
Istra Pula	4–3	Orebić	3–0	1–1
Špansko	3–8	Trešnjevka	2–3	1–5
Zadar	8–2	Baranja Beli Manastir	7–0	1–2
Orijent	1–5	Osijek	0–3	1–2
Čakovec	2–5	NK Zagreb	1–1	1–4
Cibalia	14–2	Podravina Ludbreg	10–1	4–1
Uljanik	0–4	Inker Zaprešić	0–1	0–3

== Second round ==
Team 1	Agg.	Team 2	1st leg	2nd leg
Slavonija Požega	2–16	HAŠK Građanski	2–5	0–11
Varteks	2–1	Rijeka	2–0	0–1
Cibalia	1–1 (a)	Inker Zaprešić	1–1	0–0
Šibenik	4–3	NK Zagreb	3–2	1–1
Istra Pula	0–6	Osijek	0–0	0–6
Zadar	4–2	Trešnjevka	4–0	0–2
Marsonia	3–6	Dubrovnik	1–3	2–3
Hajduk Split	5–0	Kraljevica	1–0	4–0

== Quarter-finals ==
Team 1	Agg.	Team 2	1st leg	2nd leg
Dubrovnik	1–2	Inker Zaprešić	1–1	0–1
Šibenik	2–3	Zadar	1–1	1–2
Hajduk Split	5–0	Osijek	2–0	3–0
Varteks	1–3	Croatia Zagreb	1–2	0–1

== Semi-finals ==
21 April 1993
20:00

Croatia Zagreb	2–1	Inker Zaprešić
Vlaović 7'; Adžić 42'	Report	Živković 18'

Stadion Maksimir, Zagreb
Attendance: 15,000
Referee: Dragutin Poljak (Zagreb)
5 May 1993
17:30

Inker Zaprešić	1–1	Croatia Zagreb
Bogdanović 74'	Report	Adžić 37'

Stadion Inkera, Zaprešić
Attendance: 5,500
Referee: Ivan Mikulčić (Velika Gorica)

Croatia Zagreb won 3–2 on aggregate.

21 April 1993
16:30

Hajduk Split	2–0	Zadar
Balajić 38'; Rapaić 72'	Report

Stadion Poljud, Split
Attendance: 5,000
Referee: Ante Kulušić (Šibenik)
5 May 1993
17:30

Zadar	2–2	Hajduk Split
Roso 30'; Vrsaljko 90' (pen.)	Report	Novaković 15'; Miše 63' (pen.)

Stadion Poljud, Split
Attendance: 1,000
Referee: Mateo Beusan (Dubrovnik)

Hajduk Split won 4–2 on aggregate.

== Final ==
=== First leg ===
19 May 1993
17:30

Hajduk Split	4–1	Croatia Zagreb
Kozniku 35', 53'; Jeličić 45'; Novaković 77'	Report	Stanić 75'

Stadion Poljud, Split
Attendance: 45,000
Referee: Dragutin Poljak (Zagreb)

=== Second leg ===
2 June 1993
20:15

Croatia Zagreb	2–1	Hajduk Split
Vlaović 15' (pen.), 71' (pen.)	Report	Kozniku 82'

Stadion Maksimir, Zagreb
Attendance: 45,000
Referee: Mateo Beusan (Dubrovnik)

Hajduk Split won 5–3 on aggregate.

== See also ==
- 1992–93 Croatian First Football League
