= Vatroslav Mihačić =

Croatian footballer

Personal information
- Full name: Vatroslav Mihačić
- Date of birth: 30 September 1967 (age 59)
- Place of birth: Zagreb, SR Croatia, SFR Yugoslavia
- Height: 1.87 m (6 ft 1 1/2 in)
- Position: Goalkeeper

Team information
- Current team: Croatia (goalkeeping coach)

Senior career*
Years	Team	Apps	(Gls)
1985–1988	Junak Sinj		
1988–1989	Kolektivac Postira		
1989–1990	Primorac		
1990–1994	Hajduk Split	61	(0)
1994–1995	Neretva	25	(0)
1995–1999	Gil Vicente	78	(0)
1999–2001	NK Zagreb	24	(0)
Total		110	(0)

Managerial career
- 2001–2002: NK Zagreb (GK coach)
- 2002–2006: Croatia (GK coach)
- 2013: Croatia U21 (GK coach)
- 2013–2015: Croatia (GK coach)
- 2020–present: Monaco (GK coach)
- 2026–: Croatia (GK coach)
- * Club domestic league appearances and goals

Vatroslav Mihačić (pronounced [ʋâtrɔslaʋ mîxat͡ʃit͡ɕ]; born 30 September 1967) is a Croatian former professional footballer who played as goalkeeper. He currently serves as the goalkeeping coach of the Croatia national team.

In his career, he played for Hajduk Split, Neretva and NK Zagreb in Croatia, and had a four-year spell at Portuguese side Gil Vicente.

He served as the goalkeeping coach of the Croatia national team on two occasions: from 2002 to 2006 under head coaches Otto Barić and Zlatko Kranjčar, and from 2013 to 2015 under Niko Kovač. He currently serves on Slaven Bilić's coaching staff.

He also served as the goalkeeping coach of the under-21 national team and AS Monaco, in both cases under Niko Kovač.

== Playing career ==
He played for Hajduk in the 1990–91 Yugoslav First League, the last season before Croatian clubs decided to leave the league to form 1. HNL, and in the 1991 Yugoslav Cup Final in which Hajduk beat the reigning champions of Europe Red Star Belgrade 1–0 to lift the trophy, alongside club stars such as Igor Štimac, Slaven Bilić, Alen Bokšić and Robert Jarni.

With Hajduk he went on to win two Croatian league titles (1992 and 1994) and the 1993 Croatian Cup. After spending the 1994–95 season at NK Neretva he moved to Gil Vicente in Portugal, with whom he won the Liga de Honra in 1999. That same year he returned to Croatia and spent two seasons playing for NK Zagreb before retiring in 2001.

== Managerial career ==
After retiring from football he worked as goalkeepers coach in coaching staff with three Croatia national football team managers: Otto Barić in 2004, Zlatko Kranjčar in 2006 and Niko Kovač in 2013.

He is director of the Croatian Football Federation coaching academy.

== Honours ==
- 1 × Yugoslav Cup: 1991
- 2 × Croatian First League: 1992, 1994
- 1 × Croatian Cup: 1993
- 1 × Croatian Super Cup: 1993
- 1 × Portuguese Second Division: 1999
