= NK Đakovo =

Croatian football club

- Full name: Nogometni klub Đakovo
- Nickname: Jedinstvo
- Founded: 1962
- Ground: Stadion NK Đakovo
- Capacity: 100
- Chairman: Zdravko Zubak
- Manager: Zoran Penava Koki
| Home colours | Away colours |

NK Đakovo was a Croatian football club based in the town of Đakovo.

In June 2012, NK Đakovo merged with its city rivals Croatia Đakovo to form HNK Đakovo Croatia.
