= 2017 Croatian Football Cup final =

- Event: 2016–17 Croatian Cup
Dinamo Zagreb	Rijeka
1	3
- Date: 31 May 2017
- Venue: Stadion Varteks, Varaždin
- Referee: Ante Vučemilović-Šimunović (Osijek)
- Attendance: 8,183

The 2017 Croatian Cup final between Dinamo Zagreb and Rijeka was played on 31 May 2017 in Varaždin.

== Road to the final ==
Dinamo Zagreb		Round	Rijeka	
Opponent	Result		Opponent	Result
bye		Preliminary round	bye	
Veli Vrh	5–0	First round	Đakovo Croatia	3–0
Bjelovar	2−1	Second round	Rudeš	5–3 (a.e.t.)
Inter Zaprešić	1–0	Quarter-finals	Lokomotiva	3–1
RNK Split	6–0	Semi-finals	Osijek	3–1
RNK Split	0–0	Semi-finals	Osijek	2–0

== Match details ==
31 May 2017
20:15

Dinamo Zagreb	1−3	Rijeka
Olmo 37'	Report	Gavranović 24', 46'; Župarić 73'

Stadion Varteks, Varaždin
Attendance: 8,183
Referee: Ante Vučemilović-Šimunović (Osijek)

Dinamo Zagreb	Rijeka

DINAMO ZAGREB:
GK	1	(Croatia) Danijel Zagorac
MF	2	(Algeria) El Arbi Hillel Soudani
MF	10	(Portugal) Paulo Machado
MF	14	(Bosnia and Herzegovina) Amer Gojak		(substituted off) 59'
FW	15	(Bosnia and Herzegovina) Armin Hodžić	(yellow card) 43'	(substituted off) 75'
MF	18	(Croatia) Domagoj Pavičić
DF	19	(Croatia) Josip Pivarić (c)	(yellow card) 30'
MF	21	(Spain) Dani Olmo
DF	23	(Croatia) Gordon Schildenfeld
DF	31	(Croatia) Marko Lešković		(substituted off) 53'
DF	77	(Romania) Alexandru Mățel
Substitutes:
GK	40	(Croatia) Dominik Livaković
DF	6	(Croatia) Vinko Soldo		(substituted on) 53'
FW	9	(Chile) Ángelo Henríquez	(yellow card) 79'	(substituted on) 75'
MF	11	(Brazil) Marcos Guilherme
MF	20	(Croatia) Sammir		(substituted on) 59'
MF	25	(Croatia) Bojan Knežević
DF	30	(Slovenia) Petar Stojanović
Manager:
(Bulgaria) Ivaylo Petev

RIJEKA:
GK	32	(Croatia) Andrej Prskalo (c)
DF	6	(North Macedonia) Stefan Ristovski	(yellow card) 39'	(substituted off) 85'
DF	13	(Croatia) Dario Župarić
MF	14	(Slovenia) Roman Bezjak
FW	17	(Switzerland) Mario Gavranović
DF	18	(Croatia) Josip Elez	(yellow card) 36'
MF	20	(Austria) Alexander Gorgon		(substituted off) 73'
MF	23	(Croatia) Franko Andrijašević	(yellow card) 51'	(substituted off) 60'
MF	27	(Croatia) Josip Mišić
MF	28	(Croatia) Filip Bradarić	(yellow card) 89'
DF	29	(Montenegro) Marko Vešović	(yellow card) 28'
Substitutes:
GK	12	(Croatia) Simon Sluga
DF	4	(Croatia) Ante Kulušić
MF	5	(Croatia) Dario Čanađija		(substituted on) 73'
DF	8	(North Macedonia) Leonard Zuta		(substituted on) 85'
MF	11	(Slovenia) Matic Črnic
MF	26	(Croatia) Mate Maleš		(substituted on) 60'
MF	77	(Switzerland) Ivan Martić
Manager:
(Slovenia) Matjaž Kek

Assistant referees:
Tomislav Petrović (Valpovo)
Miro Grgić (Osijek)
Fourth official:
Dalibor Conjar (Osijek)
Additional assistant referees:
Mario Zebec (Cestica)
Duje Strukan (Split)

Match rules

- 90 minutes.
- 30 minutes of extra-time if necessary.
- Penalty shoot-out if scores still level.
- Seven named substitutes.
- Maximum of three substitutions.
