= Damir Lesjak =

Croatian footballer (born 1967)

Personal information
- Date of birth: 31 March 1967 (age 59)
- Place of birth: Čakovec, SFR Yugoslavia
- Height: 1.86 m (6 ft 1 in)
- Position: Defender

Senior career*
Years	Team	Apps	(Gls)
1986–1995	Dinamo Zagreb	177	(7)
1995–1996	Hapoel Haifa	28	(4)
1996–1999	Mouscron	61	(3)
Total		266	(14)
- * Club domestic league appearances and goals

Damir Lesjak (born 31 March 1967) is a former Croatian footballer who played for Dinamo Zagreb, Israeli side Hapoel Haifa and Belgian club Mouscron.

== Club career ==
Born in Čakovec, Lesjak joined Dinamo Zagreb's academy as a promising young player and Yugoslavia U21 international before turning professional and joining the first team squad in the 1986–87 season. He immediately made an impact and appeared in 19 Yugoslav First League matches in his debut season. He went on to establish himself as a regular member of Dinamo's defensive line-up, and played along other Dinamo greats such as Zvonimir Boban, Davor Šuker and Dražen Ladić in the following years.

He won the 1992–93 Prva HNL and the 1994 Croatian Cup with Dinamo, and made a total of 510 appearances and scored 8 goals for the club (including 177 appearances and 7 goals in the Yugoslav First League and later in the Prva HNL) before moving abroad and joining Israel's Hapoel Haifa. After finishing fourth with Hapoel in the 1995–96 season, Lesjak moved to Mouscron where he spent the last three seasons of his career playing in the Belgian First Division before retiring in 1999.
