= Sejad Halilović =

Bosnian former professional footballer (born 1969)

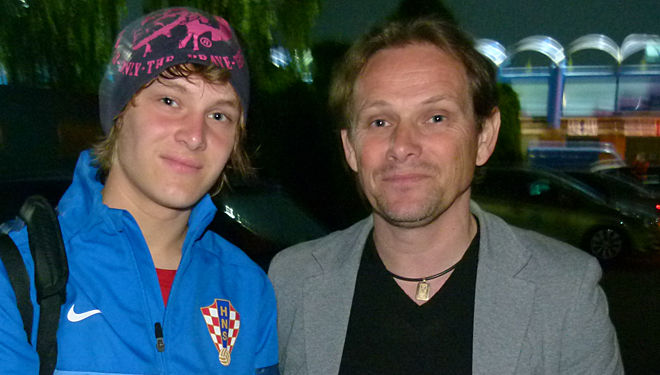
- Halilović (right)

Personal information
- Full name: Sejad Halilović
- Date of birth: 16 March 1969 (age 57)
- Place of birth: Doboj, SR Bosnia and Herzegovina, Yugoslavia
- Height: 1.70 m (5 ft 7 in)
- Position: Midfielder

Senior career*
Years	Team	Apps	(Gls)
1990–1992	Cibalia	46	(4)
1992–1995	Croatia Zagreb	59	(2)
1995–1996	Real Valladolid	17	(0)
1996–1997	Hapoel Be'er Sheva	23	(3)
1997–1999	Karabükspor	50	(4)
1999–2000	Altay	18	(0)
2001	Osijek	8	(0)
2001–2002	Ironi Rishon LeZion	26	(0)
2002	Rijeka	8	(0)
2003–2004	Ljubljana	22	(0)
2003	→ Mura 05 (loan)	7	(0)
Total		285	(13)

International career^{‡}
1994	Croatia	1	(0)
1996–2000	Bosnia and Herzegovina	15	(0)

Managerial career
- 2008–2014: Dinamo Zagreb (Youth)
- * Club domestic league appearances and goals as of 22 July 2015 (UTC) ‡ National team caps and goals as of 22 July 2015

Sejad Halilović (born 16 March 1969) is a Bosnian former professional footballer who played for several clubs throughout Europe, including Dinamo Zagreb, Real Valladolid and Hapoel Be'er Sheva.

In addition, he played one game for the Croatia national team before Bosnia and Herzegovina gained independence and represented Bosnia and Herzegovina after they gained independence.

== Playing career ==
=== Club ===
Halilović began his professional career in the Croatian team Cibalia. During the two years played Halilović 46 games and scored 4 goals.

In 1992, Halilović signed for Croatia Zagreb (now Dinamo Zagreb) for three seasons, during which he won the Croatian First Football League and Croatian Football Cup. During those three seasons, Halilović played 59 games and scored 9 goals.

During the summer of 1995, Halilović joined Real Valladolid, but after a season where he played 17 times and did not find the net, Halilović moved on to Hapoel Be'er Sheva. Halilović played a significant part in the team that won the Israel State Cup final after defeating Maccabi Tel Aviv F.C. 1–0. During the summer of 1997, Halilović moved to the Turkish Süper Lig and played for three years for two different teams.

In 2000, Halilović returned to the Croatian First Football League for one season and signed for NK Osijek, but played only 8 games.

In season 2001/2002 Halilović returned once again to Israel and played for Hapoel Rishon LeZion F.C., where he helped the team stay in the Premier League.

After playing for other teams in Croatia, Halilović retired from professional football in 2004 while at NK Ljubljana.

=== International ===
On 17 August 1994, Halilović played for Croatia against Israel at the Ramat Gan Stadium. The game ended in victory for Croatia.

He then switched allegiance and made his debut for Bosnia and Herzegovina in an October 1996 FIFA World Cup qualification match in Bologna, ironically against his former representative team Croatia, and has earned a total of 15 caps, scoring no goals. His final international was a January 2000 friendly match against Qatar.

== Managerial career ==
Halilović, started in 2008 to train the youth department of Dinamo Zagreb but left in 2014 because of his son Alen Halilović signed for FC Barcelona.

== Personal life ==
Halilović is an ethnic Bosniak. During the Bosnian War in 1992 as a professional player, he moved to Vinkovci, then to Zagreb where he met his Croatian wife Vanessa. His son Alen is a professional footballer who has represented the Croatia national football team. His other two sons, Dino Halilović and Damir Halilović, are also professional players.

== Honours ==
=== Club ===
Croatia Zagreb

- Croatian League: 1992–93
- Croatian Cup: 1993–94

Hapoel Be'er Sheva

- Israel State Cup: 1996–97
