= Saša Peršon =

Croatian footballer

Personal information
- Date of birth: 28 February 1965 (age 61)
- Place of birth: Rijeka, Yugoslavia
- Height: 1.77 m (5 ft 10 in)
- Position: Defender

Senior career*
Years	Team	Apps	(Gls)
1983–1987	Orijent		
1987–1990	Rijeka	89	(0)
1990–1991	Dinamo Zagreb	28	(0)
1991–1992	HAŠK Građanski	18	(0)
1992–1995	Hajduk Split	60	(0)
1995–1997	Cannes	19	(0)
1997–1998	Rijeka	20	(1)

International career
1990–1993	Croatia	3	(0)
- * Club domestic league appearances and goals

Saša Peršon (born 28 February 1965 in Yugoslavia) is a Croatian retired footballer who played as a defender. At international level, he was capped 3 times for Croatia.

== International career ==
Peršon made his debut for Croatia in an October 1990 friendly match against the United States and earned a total of 3 caps, scoring no goals. His final international was a June 1993 friendly against Ukraine. His first two games were unofficial though, as Croatia was still part of Yugoslavia at the time.

== Career statistics ==
=== Club ===
Club performance			League		Cup		League Cup		Continental		Total	
Season	Club	League	Apps	Goals	Apps	Goals	Apps	Goals	Apps	Goals	Apps	Goals
Yugoslavia			League		Yugoslav Cup		League Cup		Europe		Total	
1983–84	NK Orijent	Yugoslav Third League - West										
1984–85	NK Orijent	Yugoslav Third League - West										
1985–86	NK Orijent	Yugoslav Third League - West										
1986–87	NK Orijent	Yugoslav Third League - West										
1987–88	NK Rijeka	Yugoslav First League	28	0	1	0	-	-	-	-	29	0
1988–89	NK Rijeka	Yugoslav First League	32	0	1	0	-	-	-	-	33	0
1989–90	NK Rijeka	Yugoslav First League	29	0	3	0	-	-	-	-	32	0
1990–91	NK Dinamo Zagreb	Yugoslav First League	28	0	3	0	-	-	2	0	33	0
Croatia			League		Croatian Cup		Super Cup		Europe		Total	
1992	NK HAŠK Građanski	Prva HNL	18	0	4	0	–	–	1	0	23	0
1992–93	NK Hajduk Split	Prva HNL	18	0	5	0	–	–	0	0	23	0
1993–94	NK Hajduk Split	Prva HNL	20	0	6	0	2	0	0	0	28	0
1994–95	NK Hajduk Split	Prva HNL	22	0	7	0	-	-	8	0	37	0
France			League		Coupe de France		Coupe de la Ligue		Europe		Total	
1995–96	AS Cannes	French Division 1	18	0	0	0	2	0	-	-	20	0
1996–97	AS Cannes	French Division 1	1	0	0	0	0	0	-	-	1	0
Croatia			League		Croatian Cup		Super Cup		Europe		Total	
1997–98	HNK Rijeka	Prva HNL	20	1	1	0	–	–	-	-	21	1
Club	Rijeka		109	1	6	0	0	0	0	0	115	1
Club	Dinamo/HAŠK Građanski		46	0	7	0	0	0	3	0	56	0
Club	Hajduk Split		60	0	18	0	2	0	9	0	89	0
Club	AC Cannes		19	0	0	0	2	0	0	0	21	0
Total			234	1	31	0	4	0	12	0	281	1

=== International ===
Yugoslavia national team
Year	Apps	Goals
1990	2	0
1991	0	0
1992	0	0
1993	1	0
Total	3	0

== Honours ==
Orijent

- Croatian Republic League - West: 1983–84, 1984–85, 1985–86

Hajduk Split

- Prva HNL: 1993–94, 1994–95
- Croatian Cup: 1993, 1995
- Croatian Super Cup: 1993
