= Ivica Bančić =

Croatian footballer

Personal information
- Full name: Ivica Bančić
- Date of birth: 29 October 1971 (age 55)
- Place of birth: Split, SFR Yugoslavia
- Position: Defender

Senior career*
Years	Team	Apps	(Gls)
1988–1995	Split		
1995	HNK Dubrovnik	14	(0)
1996	Varteks	12	(0)
1996–1999	VfB Leipzig	95	(1)
2000	VFC Plauen	15	(0)
2000–2002	Rot-Weiß Erfurt	56	(1)
- * Club domestic league appearances and goals

Ivica Bančić (born 29 October 1971) is a retired Croatian football player who played for both Croatian and lower league German clubs.
