= Ivan Režić =

Croatian footballer (born 1979)

Personal information
- Full name: Ivan Režić
- Date of birth: 15 September 1979 (age 47)
- Place of birth: Split, SR Croatia, SFR Yugoslavia
- Height: 1.85 m (6 ft 1 in)
- Position: Midfielder

Youth career
- –1997: Varteks

Senior career*
Years	Team	Apps	(Gls)
1997–1998	Varteks	8	(0)
1998–1999	Internazionale	0	(0)
1999–2004	Varteks	88	(5)
2004–2006	Olympiacos	4	(0)
2006	Hajduk Split	8	(0)
2006–2007	Maccabi Tel Aviv	10	(1)
2013–2015	Varaždin	1	(0)
2015–2016	Međimurje	30	(0)
2016–2017	Varaždin	4	(0)
2017–2019	Međimurje	50	(6)
2019–2020	NK Bednja Beletinec		
2020	NK Rudar Mursko Središće		
2020–2022	Varteks	36	(0)

International career
2003	Croatia	1	(0)
- * Club domestic league appearances and goals

Ivan Režić (born 15 September 1979) is a retired Croatian footballer who last played as a midfielder for Varteks. He made one appearance for the Croatia national team in 2003.

== Career ==
Režić earned his first and only cap for Croatia on 9 February 2003 in a friendly against Macedonia. The home match, which was played in Šibenik, finished as a 2–2 draw.

=== Career statistics ===
==== International ====
Croatia
Year	Apps	Goals
2003	1	0
Total	1	0
