= Dražen Besek =

Croatian footballer and coach

Personal information
- Date of birth: 10 March 1963 (age 63)
- Place of birth: Varaždin, SR Croatia, SFR Yugoslavia
- Position: Midfielder

Team information
- Current team: Varteks (manager)

Senior career*
Years	Team	Apps	(Gls)
1980–1984	Varteks	31	(2)
1984–1985	Olimpija Ljubljana	17	(2)
1985–1991	Dinamo Zagreb	130	(17)
1991–1992	Stade de Vallauris		
1992–1993	Ikast FS	17	(1)
1994–1996	Varteks	53	(5)
1996–1997	Casino Salzburg	11	(0)
1997–1999	Varteks	33	(2)

Managerial career
- 1998–2000: Varteks (player-manager)
- 2000–2001: Čakovec
- 2001–2002: Slaven Belupo
- 2002–2003: Varteks
- 2003–2005: Zagłębie Lubin
- 2006–2007: Drava Ptuj
- 2007–2009: Varteks
- 2010–2011: Shanghai Shenhua (assistant)
- 2011: China U23 (assistant)
- 2011–2012: Shanghai Shenhua
- 2012–2013: NK Zagreb
- 2013–2014: Hunan Billows
- 2014–2015: Wuhan Zall
- 2015: Tianjin Songjiang
- 2015: Osijek
- 2015–2016: Birkirkara FC
- 2018–2020: Shanghai Shenhua (adviser)
- 2022–2023: Maghreb de Fès (general manager)
- 2024–: NK Varteks Varazdin
- * Club domestic league appearances and goals

Dražen Besek (born 10 March 1963) is a Croatian football coach and a former professional football midfield player. As a player he spent most of his career playing for Croatian teams Varteks and Dinamo Zagreb before moving abroad and appearing for clubs in France, Denmark and Austria. After his playing career ended he went into management, and had several coaching spells at his hometown football club Varteks, before moving abroad again and joining Polish side Zagłębie Lubin, Chinese side Shanghai Shenhua and many others.

== Club career ==
In Croatia, Besek played for Dinamo Zagreb in the Yugoslav First League and Varteks in the Croatian First Football League. In his international career, he played in French Stade de Vallauris, Danish Ikast FS (now called FC Midtjylland) and Austrian SV Casino Salzburg (now called FC Red Bull Salzburg)

== Coaching career ==
Besek started his coaching career in his hometown football club of Varteks as a player-coach within the Croatian 1998–99 Prva HNL league season. He guided the club to the quarter finals of the UEFA Cup Winners' Cup in the same season. This was followed by a brief spell at second-tier club Čakovec, which he helped to promote to the top tier. He returned to another top-tier club with Slaven Belupo where in the 2001–02 Prva HNL he guided them to a respectable sixth and reached the 3rd round of UEFA Intertoto Cup when the team lost against Aston Villa. This saw Varteks interested in his services again where within the 2002–03 Prva HNL campaign he aided them to an improved third at the end of the season and a runner-up place in the Croatian Football Cup.

After that Besek joined Polish club Zagłębie Lubin where he promoted the club to the first Polish league and reached a runner-up place in Polish Cup.

In 2006, Besek joined top tier Slovenian club Drava Ptuj for a brief period before returning to Varteks for the third time as a manager. On 26 December 2009 Besek decided to leave the club after accepting a position from top tier Chinese Super League club Shanghai Shenhua where he was an assistant coach to Miroslav Blažević. After his one-year contract with the club expired he followed Blažević to become an assistant coach for the China U-23 team.

On 10 August 2011 he returned to Shanghai Shenhua but this time as the head coach to replace Xi Zhikang for the rest of the season. After leaving Shenhua at the end of 2011, Besek took over NK Zagreb in March 2012. Besek would return to China with second-tier club Hunan Billows F.C. for the start of the 2013 China League One campaign.

In China he managed two more clubs, Wuhan Zall and Tianjin Songjiang before returning to Europe and taking over the top tier Osijek in 2015–16 Prva HNL. At the end of 2015, Besek took over Birkirkara FC with which he achieved the highest result in then Maltese football club European history kicking Scottish Hearts out of the UEFA Europa League qualifiers. From 2018 till 2020, Besek has been an adviser to Chinese Shanghai Shenhua. In his last spell, he took a general manager position at the Moroccan Maghreb de Fès.
