= HNK Đakovo Croatia =

Croatian football club

- Full name: Hrvatski nogometni klub Đakovo Croatia
- Founded: 2012 (merger of NK Đakovo and NK Croatia Đakovo)
- Ground: Gradski Stadion
- Capacity: 1,800
- Chairman: Josip Abramović
- League: Third Football League (Croatia) 3. NL East
Home colours	Away colours

HNK Đakovo-Croatia is a Croatian professional football club based in the town of Đakovo.

Đakovo was formed in June 2012, when two city rivals, NK Croatia Đakovo and NK Đakovo, merged due to financial troubles both clubs were facing.
