= Krešimir Ganjto =

Croatian football manager

Personal information
- Date of birth: 7 November 1955 (age 70)

Team information
- Current team: NK Odra (manager)

Managerial career
- Years: Team
- Trnje
- 2011–2012: Trešnjevka
- 2012: Karlovac
- 2012: Vrbovec
- 2012–2013: Hrvatski Dragovoljac (youth)
- 2013: Hrvatski Dragovoljac
- 2015–2016: Segesta
- 2016: Lučko
- 2018: Lučko
- 2018-: Lučko (youth)
- 2023-: Odra

Krešimir Ganjto (born 7 November 1955) is a Croatian football manager.

He took charge at Odra in January 2023, after working for Trnje, Trešnjevka, Karlovac, Vrbovec, Hrvatski Dragovoljac, Segesta and Lučko. He has also worked as a scout for Dinamo Zagreb and at NK Zagreb's football academy.
