= Danijel Hrman =

Croatian footballer

Personal information
- Date of birth: 7 August 1975 (age 51)
- Place of birth: Ivanec, SFR Yugoslavia
- Height: 1.72 m (5 ft 8 in)
- Position: Midfielder

Youth career
- Bojovnik

Senior career*
Years	Team	Apps	(Gls)
1997–2003	Varteks	139	(10)
2003	Spartak Moscow	6	(0)
2003–2005	Dinamo Zagreb	8	(1)
2004–2006	Hajduk Split	11	(0)
2006–2007	Varteks	12	(0)
2007–2008	Varteks	1	(0)

International career
2001–2003	Croatia	4	(0)
- * Club domestic league appearances and goals

Danijel Hrman (born 7 August 1975) is a retired Croatian football midfielder.

== Club career ==
In 1997 Hrman started his football career with NK Varteks, where he played six seasons before moving to Russia to play in the capital for Spartak Moscow. After a season there he returned to Croatia, playing for Dinamo Zagreb and Hajduk Split, before returning to NK Varteks. He signed for SK Tirana in the 2007 summer break but was soon back with NK Varteks as a free player.

Hrman is said to have played for Tirana in Albania, but he has refuted these claims.

== International career ==
He made his international debut against South Korea in the 2-0 friendly win in Seoul on 10 November 2001. He has made four appearances for the Croatia national football team, his final international being a February 2003 friendly match against Macedonia.
