= Dževad Turković =

Croatian footballer (born 1972)

Personal information
- Full name: Dževad Turković
- Date of birth: 17 June 1972 (age 54)
- Place of birth: Titograd, SR Montenegro, SFR Yugoslavia
- Height: 1.72 m (5 ft 7 1/2 in)
- Position: Midfielder

Senior career*
Years	Team	Apps	(Gls)
1989–1996	Dinamo Zagreb	103	(23)
1996–2001	Daewoo Royals	70	(8)
2001	Ilhwa Chunma	2	(0)
2002–2003	Osijek	6	(0)

International career
1994–1995	Croatia	6	(0)
- * Club domestic league appearances and goals

Dževad Turković (born 17 June 1972) is a former Croatian football player. He capped 6 times for Croatia. He was champion of the Prva HNL in 1993, 1996 and 1997.

== Club career ==
Turković played domestically for Dinamo Zagreb and Osijek and for South Korean clubs Daewoo Royals / Pusan i.cons and Seongnam Ilhwa Chunma.

== International career ==
He made his debut for Croatia in a May 1994 friendly match away against Hungary, coming on as a 46th-minute substitute for Igor Cvitanović, and earned a total of 6 caps, scoring no goals. His final international was a September 1995 European Championship qualification match against Estonia.
