= Alen Peternac =

Croatian footballer (born 1972)

Personal information
- Date of birth: 16 January 1972 (age 54)
- Place of birth: Zagreb, Croatia
- Height: 1.85 m (6 ft 1 in)
- Position: Striker

Team information
- Current team: Rudeš (manager)

Senior career*
Years	Team	Apps	(Gls)
1989–1995	Dinamo Zagreb	39	(7)
1993–1994	→ Segesta (loan)	43	(20)
1995–2000	Valladolid	153	(55)
2000–2003	Zaragoza	10	(0)
2001–2002	→ Murcia (loan)	21	(2)
Total		266	(84)

International career
1999	Croatia B	1	(0)
1999	Croatia	2	(0)

Managerial career
- 2017-2019: Al Ain (assistant)
- 2019: Al Hilal (assistant)
- 2020–2023: Dinamo Zagreb (assistant)
- 2025: Igman Konjic
- 2026-: Rudeš
- * Club domestic league appearances and goals

Alen Peternac (born 16 January 1972) is a Croatian professional football manager and former player who is the manager of Croatian First League club Rudeš. He is best known for his stint at Real Valladolid, spending the better part of his professional career in Spain, appearing in 206 official games in representation of three clubs.

== Club career ==
Peternac was born in Zagreb, Socialist Federative Republic of Yugoslavia. In 1989, he started his football career at hometown NK Dinamo Zagreb, and played six years for Dinamo and HNK Segesta in the Croatian league before moving to Spain.

Peternac spent five seasons at Real Valladolid, appearing in 171 competitive games and becoming the team's all-time top goalscorer in La Liga. His goal total also made him the second-highest Croatian goalscorer in the competition, behind Sevilla FC and Real Madrid's Davor Šuker.

On 19 May 1996, in an 8–3 away win against Real Oviedo which proved crucial in helping Valladolid avoid direct relegation in 1995–96, Peternac set a club record by netting five times, four of which on penalty kicks. He finished that campaign as the fourth top goalscorer, with 23 goals.

For 2000–01, Peternac joined Real Zaragoza, receiving limited playing time. He was then loaned to Real Murcia, where he played one season in the second division before closing out his career back with the Aragonese (one match, followed by retirement due to injuries).

== International career ==
Peternac earned his first cap for Croatia on 10 February 1999 against Denmark, in a friendly played in Split which Croatia lost 1–0. Exactly one month after he appeared in another exhibition game, a 3–2 loss against Greece; incidentally, he was replaced by Goran Vlaović in his two appearances, at half-time.

== Managerial career ==
On 22 April 2020, following the appointment of Igor Jovićević as Dinamo Zagreb manager, Peternac was named his assistant. On 12 April 2025, he was appointed manager of Bosnian Premier League club Igman Konjic. On 1 January 2026, he was appointed manager of Croatian First League club Rudeš.

== Managerial statistics ==
As of match played on 3 August 2026

Managerial record by team and tenure
Team	Nat	From	To	Record							
Team	Nat	From	To	G	W	D	L	GF	GA	GD	Win %
Igman Konjic	(Bosnia and Herzegovina)	12 April 2025	30 June 2025	9	2	3	4	10	14	−4	22.22
Rudeš	(Croatia)	1 January 2026	Present	17	10	3	4	28	15	+13	58.82
Career total				26	12	6	8	38	29	+9	46.15
