= Joško Jeličić =

Croatian footballer (born 1971)

Personal information
- Date of birth: 5 January 1971 (age 55)
- Place of birth: Solin, SR Croatia, Yugoslavia
- Position: Midfielder

Senior career*
Years	Team	Apps	(Gls)
1987–1993	Hajduk Split	158	(38)
1993–1996	Croatia Zagreb	75	(24)
1996–1997	Sevilla	23	(2)
1997–2001	Dinamo Zagreb	59	(12)
2002	Pohang Steelers	8	(0)
2002–2003	NK Zagreb	0	(0)
Total		325	(76)

International career
1992	Croatia	1	(0)
- * Club domestic league appearances and goals

Joško Jeličić (born 5 January 1971) is a Croatian former professional footballer who played as a midfielder. He had spells with Pohang Steelers, Dinamo Zagreb, Sevilla and Hajduk Split.

== Club career ==
He has spent most of his career in the two biggest clubs in Croatia Hajduk Split and Dinamo Zagreb .

== International career ==
Jeličić made his debut for Croatia in a July 1992 friendly match away against Australia, getting himself sent off in the second half. It remained his sole international appearance.

== Post-playing career ==
After retirement, Jeličić started working as a sports commentator and pundit for the Arena Sport television channel, then moved to RTL, Croatian Radiotelevision and MAXSport. In 2025, he was involved in a live TV clash with Hajduk Split head coach Gennaro Gattuso.

== Honours ==
Hajduk Split

- Yugoslav Cup (1): 1991
- Croatian First League (1): 1992
- Croatian Cup (1): 1993

Dinamo Zagreb

- Croatian First League (4): 1992–93, 1997–98, 1998–99, 1999–2000
- Croatian Cup (3): 1994, 1998, 2001
