= Vjekoslav Škrinjar =

Croatian footballer

Personal information
- Full name: Vjekoslav Škrinjar
- Date of birth: 2 June 1969 (age 57)
- Place of birth: Slavonski Brod, Yugoslavia
- Height: 1.72 m (5 ft 7 1/2 in)
- Position: Midfielder

Senior career*
Years	Team	Apps	(Gls)
1987–1989	BSK Slavonski Brod		
1989–1991	Dinamo Zagreb	36	(1)
1991–1992	NK Zagreb	20	(2)
1992–1994	Croatia Zagreb	48	(5)
1995–1996	Gamba Osaka	30	(3)
1997–1999	Zagreb	51	(9)
1999	Segesta		
2000–2002	Mainz	41	(0)
- * Club domestic league appearances and goals

Vjekoslav Škrinjar (born 2 June 1969) is a Croatian retired football player.

== Career ==
Škrinjar joined BSK Slavonski Brod from Borac Podvinje at age 12 and moved on to Yugoslav powerhouse Dinamo Zagreb for whom he played over 200 matches and won the domestic league and cup. He was on the pitch for the infamous Dinamo-Red Star Belgrade football riot in May 1990 that possibly ignited the beginning of the end for the Yugoslav First League.

He finished his career in the German second tier playing for FSV Mainz.

== Post-playing career ==
Škrinjar went into construction and agricultural businesses after retiring as a player and also owns a hotel in Mandre, Pag.
