= Željko Adžić =

Croatian footballer (born 1965)

Personal information
- Full name: Željko Adžić
- Date of birth: 28 August 1965 (age 61)
- Place of birth: Požega, SR Croatia, Yugoslavia
- Position: Midfielder

Senior career*
Years	Team	Apps	(Gls)
1984–1986	Dinamo Zagreb	2	(0)
1986	Hamilton Croatia		
1986–1988	Hamilton Steelers	45	(22)
1988–1990	Melbourne Croatia	38	(24)
1990–1994	Dinamo Zagreb	95	(25)
1994–1995	Hércules Alicante	16	(1)
1995–1996	Hrvatski Dragovoljac	16	(4)
1996–1997	Inker Zaprešić	19	(2)
1997–1998	Hapoel Beit She'an	12	(5)

International career
1993	Croatia	1	(1)
- * Club domestic league appearances and goals

Željko Adžić (also known as Jerry Adzic) (born 28 August 1965, in Požega) is a Croatian retired footballer.

== Club career ==
He won the Prva HNL with HAŠK Građanski (Dinamo Zagreb) in 1993. While playing with Melbourne Croatia he won the Johnny Warren Medal. Left Australia shortly afterwards to return to Dinamo Zagreb.

== International career ==
He played one game internationally for Croatia, a friendly match against Ukraine on 26 June 1993 scoring at Maksimir Stadium.

== Career statistics ==
=== International goals ===
No.	Date	Venue	Opponent	Score	Result	Competition
1	26 June 1993	Stadion Maksimir, Zagreb, Croatia	Ukraine	2–0	3–1	Friendly match

Awards
Preceded by Inaugural Winner	Johnny Warren Medallist; 1989/90	Succeeded by Milan Ivanovic
