= Dario Šimić =

Croatian footballer (born 1975)

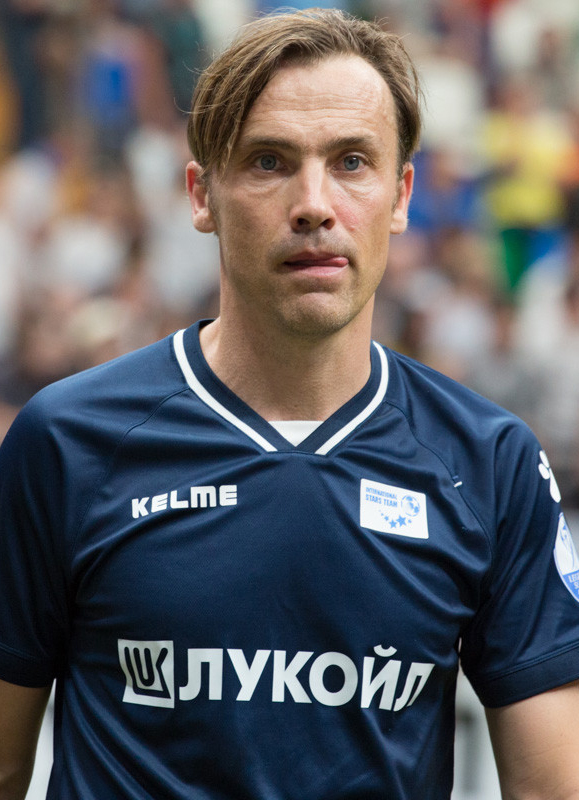
- Šimić in 2018

Personal information
- Date of birth: 12 November 1975 (age 50)
- Place of birth: Zagreb, SR Croatia, Yugoslavia
- Height: 1.80 m (5 ft 11 in)
- Position: Defender

Youth career
- 1987–1992: Dinamo Zagreb

Senior career*
Years	Team	Apps	(Gls)
1992–1999	Dinamo Zagreb	140	(14)
1999–2002	Inter Milan	66	(3)
2002–2008	AC Milan	82	(1)
2008–2010	Monaco	27	(0)
2010	Dinamo Zagreb	0	(0)
Total		315	(18)

International career
1993	Croatia U17	2	(0)
1993–1994	Croatia U18	2	(0)
1993–1994	Croatia U19	4	(0)
1995	Croatia U20	1	(0)
1994–1996	Croatia U21	8	(1)
1996–2008	Croatia	100	(3)
Medal record
Men's football
Representing Croatia
FIFA World Cup
Bronze medal – third place	1998 France
- * Club domestic league appearances and goals

Dario Šimić (pronounced [dâːrio ʃǐːmitɕ]; born 12 November 1975) is a Croatian former footballer. Šimić was a versatile defender who played as full-back, sweeper or centre back; a physical and hard-tackling defender, he was known in particular for his strength and ability in the air. A product of Dinamo Zagreb Academy, he later played for Serie A sides Inter Milan and AC Milan and Ligue 1 side Monaco, before returning to Dinamo Zagreb in 2010, where he retired from the game during the same year.

Šimić played for Croatia national football team between 1996 and 2008. He retired from international football shortly after becoming the first Croatian player to win 100 international caps. He is currently the team's eighth most capped player. He was a member of Croatia's squad for each of the six major tournaments for which the team qualified during the 1990s and 2000s, which includes three FIFA World Cups (11 appearances in 1998, 2002 and 2006) and three UEFA European Championships (5 appearances in 1996, 2004 and 2008). At his first World Cup in 1998, he helped the team secure third place, earning his first World Cup medal.

== Club career ==
Under coach Marcello Lippi, Šimić made his Serie A debut for Inter Milan in a 2–0 victory against Venezia at San Siro on 10 January 1999. By the end of his first season in Italy, Šimić earned a total of 17 appearances and scored 2 goals for Internazionale. In the following couple of seasons, Šimić's services were regularly used until the 2001–02 season, when he had only 12 league and 8 European appearances. In June 2002 Internazionale and their cross-city rivals AC Milan agreed a player swap with Ümit Davala going in the opposite direction, which Šimić was valued €16.5 million, despite it was purely accounting purpose. In his 3 1/2 years with Internazionale, he earned a total of 66 league appearances and scored three goals. The club failed to win any silverware in this period, and their highest finish was fourth place in the 1999–2000 season, even though this was the time when some of football's biggest stars played there with Šimić, such as Roberto Baggio, Ronaldo, Ivan Zamorano, Diego Simeone and Christian Vieri.

In August 2008, Šimić moved to Monaco for two years. On 27 April 2010, Šimić returned to Dinamo Zagreb on a free transfer, after having spent eleven years playing abroad. However, Šimić went on to announce his retirement from active football only three months later on 10 August 2010. During the short spell Šimić appeared in 3 competitive matches for the Blues, including the 2010 Croatian Supercup, and two European away matches against Koper and Sheriff Tiraspol, without ever appearing in the 2010–11 Prva HNL. In his announcement, Šimić said that he enrolled at the coaching academy and confirmed that his future plans involved staying in football, possibly as a manager.

== International career ==
Šimić played for Croatia national football team between 1996 and 2008. On 16 September 2008, Šimić announced his retirement from international football after being a Croatian international footballer for 12 1/2 years.

== Personal life ==
Šimić is a devout Catholic and organizes pilgrimages. He is the owner of Aquaviva company, a bottled water company. Šimić was detained by Croatian anti-corruption agency USKOK in 2026 for illegally obtaining a permit for a campsite business in Tisno.

He married Jelena Medić in 2000 with whom he has sons Roko, Viktor, Nikolas and David, the latter of whom has Down syndrome. He is the older brother of Josip Šimić and a distant relative of Herzegovinian hajduk Andrijica Šimić.

== Career statistics ==
=== Club ===
Club performance			League		Cup^{1}		League Cup		Continental		Total	
Season	Club	League	Apps	Goals	Apps	Goals	Apps	Goals	Apps	Goals	Apps	Goals
Croatia			League		Croatian Cup		League Cup		Europe		Total	
1992–93	Croatia Zagreb	Prva HNL	6	0	1	0	-		-		7	0
1993–94	Croatia Zagreb	Prva HNL	19	2	6	0	-		-		25	2
1994–95	Croatia Zagreb	Prva HNL	22	1	8	0	-		1	0	31	1
1995–96	Croatia Zagreb	Prva HNL	26	2	8	1	-		-		34	3
1996–97	Croatia Zagreb	Prva HNL	25	6	6	2	-		4	1	35	9
1997–98	Croatia Zagreb	Prva HNL	29	2	2	0	-		9	1	40	3
1998–99	Croatia Zagreb	Prva HNL	13	1	-		-		8	0	21	1
Italy			League		Coppa Italia		League Cup		Europe		Total	
1998–99	Internazionale Milano	Serie A	15	2	6	0	-		6	0	27	2
1999–2000	Internazionale Milano	Serie A	19	1	3	0	-		-		22	1
2000–01	Internazionale Milano	Serie A	18	0	2	0	-		4	1	24	1
2001–02	Internazionale Milano	Serie A	12	0	1	0	-		8	0	21	0
2002–03	Milan	Serie A	29	1	3	0	-		13	0	45	1
2003–04	Milan	Serie A	10	0	6	0	-		2	0	18	0
2004–05	Milan	Serie A	2	0	1	0	-		-		3	0
2005–06	Milan	Serie A	15	0	4	0	-		2	0	21	0
2006–07	Milan	Serie A	22	0	6	0	-		6	0	34	0
2007–08	Milan	Serie A	4	0	2	0	-		1	0	7	0
France			League		Coupe de France		Coupe de la Ligue		Europe		Total	
2008–09	Monaco	Ligue 1	27	0	2	0	1	0	-		30	0
2009–10	Monaco	Ligue 1	0	0	0	0	0	0	-		0	0
Croatia			League		Croatian Cup		League Cup		Europe		Total	
2010–11	Dinamo Zagreb	Prva HNL	0	0	1	0	-		2	0	3	0
Country	Croatia		140	14	32	3	-		24	2	164	16
Country	Italy		146	4	34	0	-		42	1	222	5
Country	France		27	0	2	0	1	0	-		30	0
Total			313	18	69	3	1	0	66	3	449	24

^{1}Played in Croatian Cup and Croatian Super Cup with Dinamo Zagreb.
^{2}Played in UEFA Champions League, UEFA Super Cup and UEFA Cup with Croatia Zagreb, Internazionale Milano and Milan.

=== International ===
Croatia national team
Year	Apps	Goals
1996	5	0
1997	8	0
1998	13	1
1999	7	0
2000	5	0
2001	8	0
2002	6	0
2003	10	1
2004	8	0
2005	5	0
2006	11	1
2007	9	0
2008	5	0
Total	100	3

=== International goals ===
#	Date	Venue	Opponent	Score	Result	Competition
1.	10 October 1998	National Stadium, Ta' Qali, Ta' Qali, Malta	Malta	1–1	4–1	UEFA Euro 2000 qualifying
2.	10 September 2003	King Baudouin Stadium, Brussels, Belgium	Belgium	1–1	1–2	UEFA Euro 2004 qualifying
3.	1 March 2006	St. Jakob-Park, Basel, Switzerland	Argentina	3–2	3–2	Friendly

== Honours ==
=== Club ===
Dinamo Zagreb

- Croatian First League: 1992–93, 1995–96, 1996–97, 1997–98
- Croatian Football Cup: 1993–94, 1995–96, 1996–97, 1997–98
- Croatian Super Cup: 2010

Milan

- Serie A: 2003–04
- Coppa Italia: 2002–03
- UEFA Champions League: 2002–03, 2006–07
- UEFA Super Cup: 2003
- FIFA Club World Cup: 2007

=== International ===
Croatia

- FIFA World Cup Third place – Bronze medal: 1998

=== Individual ===
- Croatian Football Hope of the Year: 1995
- UEFA awards 100 caps: 2011

=== Orders ===
- Order of the Croatian Interlace – 1998

== See also ==
- List of footballers with 100 or more caps
