= Slavko Ištvanić =

Croatian footballer

Personal information
- Date of birth: 12 July 1966 (age 60)
- Place of birth: Zagreb, SR Croatia, SFR Yugoslavia
- Position: Defender

Senior career*
| Years | Team | Apps | (Gls) |
| 1983–1991 | Dinamo Zagreb | 94 | (2) |
| 1991–1992 | HAŠK Građanski | 20 | (0) |
| 1992–1995 | Croatia Zagreb | 84 | (0) |
| 1996 | Segesta | 10 | (0) |
| 2000–2001 | Croatia Sesvete | 11 | (0) |
| 2001 | Novalja | 14 | (0) |
| 2002 | Dugo Selo | 6 | (0) |

International career
| 1991–1994 | Croatia | 3 | (0) |
- * Club domestic league appearances and goals

Slavko Ištvanić (born 12 July 1966 in Zagreb) is a retired Croatian professional footballer who played over 200 league matches for NK Dinamo Zagreb in the Croatian Prva HNL.

== International career ==
Ištvanić made his debut for Croatia in a June 1991 friendly match against Slovenia and earned a total of 3 caps, scoring no goals. His first was not official, though, since Croatia was still part of Yugoslavia at the time. His final international was an April 1994 friendly away against Slovakia.
