= Vladimir Petrović (footballer, born 1972) =

Croatian footballer (born 1972)

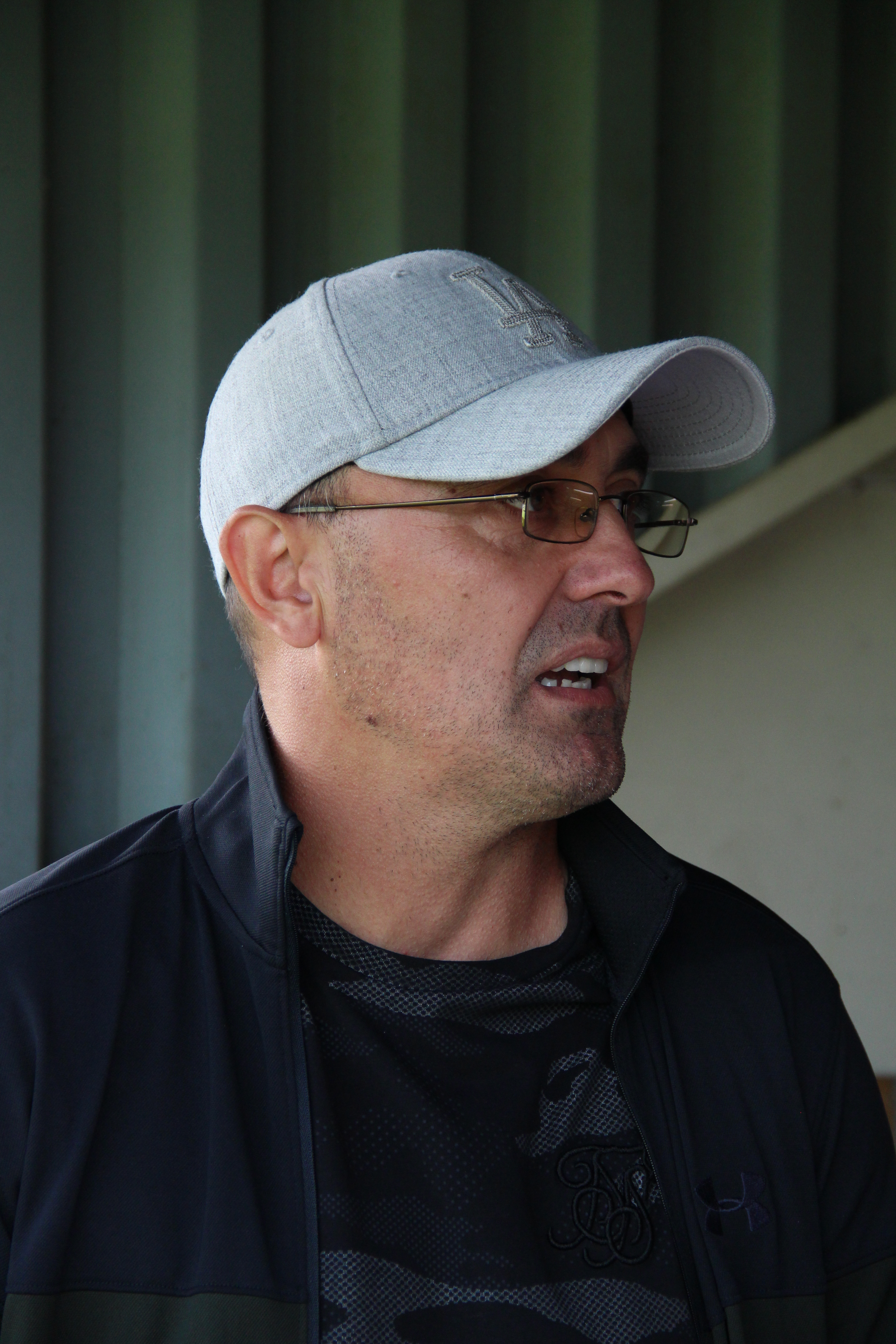
- Petrović in 2018

Personal information
- Date of birth: 5 May 1972 (age 54)
- Place of birth: Teslić, SFR Yugoslavia
- Height: 1.80 m (5 ft 11 in)
- Position: Forward

Team information
- Current team: Kapfenberg (academy coach)

Youth career
- 1993: Rot Weiss Knittelfeld

Senior career*
Years	Team	Apps	(Gls)
1994–1995	Marsonia	30	(5)
1995–1997	Segesta	40	(13)
1997	Dinamo Zagreb	44	(12)
1998–2000	Toulouse	65	(22)
2000–2001	Beitar Jerusalem	13	(2)
2001–2003	Dinamo Zagreb	38	(10)
2003	Qingdao Jonoon	23	(7)
2004	NK Zagreb	11	(1)
2004	Međimurje	1	(0)
2005–2006	Hangzhou Greentown		
2006	Kapfenberg	19	(2)
2006–2009	Croatia Sesvete	53	(23)
2009	Koper	11	(1)
2009–2011	Radnik Sesvete	54	(27)

Managerial career
- 2015: Deutschlandsberger SC
- 2015–: Kapfenberg (academy)
- 2016-2020: Kapfenberg (assistant)
- 2018–2019: TuS Spielberg
- 2019–2022: Kapfenberg
- 2020: Rapid Kapfenberg
- 2022–: Kapfenberg (academy)
- * Club domestic league appearances and goals

Vladimir Petrović (born 4 February 1972) is a football coach and former player who is coaching at the academy of Austrian club Kapfenberger SV. A forward, Petrović played for a number of teams in Croatia, France, Israel, China, Austria and Slovenia.
