= NK Špansko =

Croatian football club

- Full name: Nogometni klub Špansko
- Founded: 16 February 1958; 67 years ago
- Ground: SRC Špansko
- Capacity: 1,000
- Manager: Mihovil Vukelić
- League: 3. HNL
- 2017–18: Treća HNL West, 13th
Home colours	Away colours

NK Špansko is a Croatian football club based in the city of Zagreb, founded in 1958. It used to be one of the strongest second division teams in Croatia, but as of 2021/22 was playing in the fourth Croatian league.

== Colors and club badge ==
NK Špansko colors are red and white. Red uniforms are usually for home matches.
