= NK Croatia Đakovo =

Croatian football club

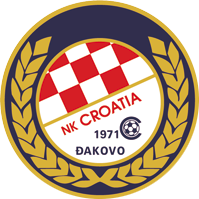
- Full name: NK Croatia Đakovo
- Nickname: Plavi
- Founded: 1971
- Dissolved: 2012
- Ground: Gradski Stadion " Sjever "
- Capacity: 3,000
- Chairman: Marko Totić
- Manager: Renato Đurđević
Home colours	Away colours

NK Croatia Đakovo was a Croatian football club based in the town of Đakovo in Croatia.

In June 2012, Croatia merged with its city rivals NK Đakovo to form HNK Đakovo Croatia.

== Honours ==
(Croatia) Treća HNL– East:

- Winners (1): 2005–06
