= Mario Novaković =

Croatian footballer (born 1969)

Personal information
- Date of birth: 9 December 1969 (age 56)
- Place of birth: Croatia
- Position: Midfielder

Senior career*
Years	Team	Apps	(Gls)
1991–1993	Hajduk		
1993–1995	Dinamo		
1995–1996	Hannover 96	15	(0)
1996–1998	Osijek		
1998–1999	Šibenik		
- * Club domestic league appearances and goals

Mario Novaković (born 9 December 1969) is a Croatian former footballer who played as a midfielder.

== Early life ==
He was born in 1969 in Croatia. He grew up in Stomorska, Croatia.

== Career ==
He started his career with Croatian side Hajduk. In 1993, he signed for Croatian side Dinamo. In 1995, he signed for German side Hannover 96. In 1996, he signed for Croatian side Osijek. In 1998, he signed for Croatian side Šibenik.

== Style of play ==
He mainly operated as a midfielder. He was left-footed.

== Personal life ==
He has been married. He has a daughter and a son.
