= Josip Gašpar =

Croatian footballer (born 1973)

Personal information
- Date of birth: 15 March 1973 (age 53)
- Place of birth: Sinj, SFR Yugoslavia (modern day Croatia)
- Position: Midfielder

Youth career
- NK Junak Sinj

Senior career*
Years	Team	Apps	(Gls)
1989–1998	Dinamo Zagreb	140	(8)
1998–2001	Osijek	61	(0)
2001–2002	Marsonia	26	(3)

International career
1992-1993	Croatia	1	(0)
- * Club domestic league appearances and goals

Josip 'Jozo' Gašpar (born 15 March 1973 in Sinj) is a Croatian retired footballer.

== Club career ==
During his club career, he played for hometown side Junak as well as for Dinamo Zagreb, Osijek, and Marsonia. As a 16-year-old, he was noticed by Dinamo's talent hunters and brought to Zagreb for a small amount of money.

== International career ==
He made his debut for Croatia in an October 1992 friendly match against Mexico, coming on as a 79th-minute substitute for Dražen Biškup, and earned a total of 2 caps, scoring no goals. His second and final international was a June 1993 friendly against Ukraine.

== Honours ==
=== Player ===
Osijek

- Croatian Cup: 1998–99
