= Silvio Marić =

Croatian footballer

Personal information
- Date of birth: 20 March 1975 (age 51)
- Place of birth: Zagreb, SR Croatia, Yugoslavia
- Height: 1.78 m (5 ft 10 in)
- Position: Attacking midfielder

Team information
- Current team: Rudeš (sporting director)

Youth career
- Metalac Sisak
- Lokomotiva

Senior career*
Years	Team	Apps	(Gls)
1992–1999	Dinamo Zagreb	91	(28)
1994	→ Segesta (loan)	9	(1)
1999–2000	Newcastle United	23	(2)
2000–2001	Porto	11	(2)
2001–2003	Dinamo Zagreb	33	(12)
2003–2005	Panathinaikos	33	(2)
2005–2006	Dinamo Zagreb	22	(1)
Total		222	(46)

International career
1994–1997	Croatia U21	20	(8)
1997–2002	Croatia	19	(1)

Managerial career
- 2022: Rudeš (sporting director)
- 2022: Rudeš
- 2022-: Rudeš (sporting director)
Medal record
Men's football
Representing Croatia
Bronze medal – third place	FIFA World Cup	1998
- * Club domestic league appearances and goals

Silvio Marić (born 20 March 1975) is a Croatian football manager and retired player who played as an attacking midfielder. As of October 2022, he is the sporting director of Rudeš.

== Club career ==
Born in Zagreb, Marić began his professional career at Dinamo Zagreb in 1992. In the autumn of 1998, he appeared for Dinamo Zagreb in all of their six group matches in the UEFA Champions League and secured himself a move to English club Newcastle United on 4 February 1999 for a transfer fee of $5.8 million. He made his Premier League debut for Newcastle United on 10 March 1999 against Nottingham Forest, but never established himself as a regular in the side and, after making 23 Premier League appearances without scoring, moved to Portuguese club Porto in 2000. At Newcastle United, he was the first Croatian player to appear in an FA Cup Final, when he came on as a substitute in the Magpies' 2–0 defeat to Manchester United in the 1999 Final. During the final, with Newcastle trailing 2–0, Marić weakly shot past the post when exceptionally well placed to score. This summed up his Newcastle career in general. He did, however, score twice for Newcastle in their 1999-2000 UEFA Cup campaign, when he netted both home and away against Zürich.

After playing one season for Porto, where he also never became a regular, he made his first comeback to Dinamo Zagreb and subsequently spent two seasons with the club before making another move abroad, to Greek club Panathinaikos in 2003. He subsequently spent two seasons at Panathinaikos and also made nine UEFA Champions League appearances for the club before making his second comeback to Dinamo Zagreb in 2005, signing a two-year contract. However, with his role in the team largely diminished and the fact that he mostly appeared as a substitute, he cancelled his contract upon the end of the 2005–06 season and thus finished his playing career. In his three spells with Dinamo, he appeared in a total of 146 league matches and scored 41 goals.

== International career ==
Marić made his international debut for the Croatia national team on 30 April 1997 in their 1998 FIFA World Cup qualifier against Greece and scored his first international goal in his second cap against Bosnia and Herzegovina on 6 September 1997 in this same qualifying session. Between 1995 and 1997, he also made several appearances for the Croatia national under-21 team.

He was also a member of the Croatian squad that won the bronze medal at the 1998 FIFA World Cup finals in France and appeared in four matches at the tournament, although he only started the final group match against Argentina. He won a total of 19 international caps for Croatia between 1997 and 2002, but his first international goal also remained his only one. His last appearance for the Croatia national team came on 12 October 2002 in their second Euro 2004 qualifier, which they lost 2–0 to Bulgaria on the road.

== Career statistics ==
Club	Season	League		Cup		Europe		Total	
Club	Season	Apps	Goals	Apps	Goals	Apps	Goals	Apps	Goals
Dinamo Zagreb	1992–93	1	0	-	-	-	-	-	-
Dinamo Zagreb	1993–94	3	0	-	-	-	-	-	-
Segesta	1994–95	9	1	-	-	-	-	-	-
Dinamo Zagreb	1994–95	8	0	-	-	-	-	-	-
Dinamo Zagreb	1995–96	21	3	-	-	-	-	-	-
Dinamo Zagreb	1996–97	26	13	-	-	-	-	-	-
Dinamo Zagreb	1997–98	18	7	-	-	-	-	-	-
Dinamo Zagreb	1998–99	14	5	-	-	-	1	-	-
Newcastle United	1998–99	10	0	-	-	-	-	-	-
Newcastle United	1999–2000	13	0	-	-	4	2	-	-
Porto	2000–01	11	2	-	-	-	-	-	-
Dinamo Zagreb	2001–02	9	5	-	-	-	-	-	-
Dinamo Zagreb	2002–03	24	7	-	-	-	-	-	-
Panathinaikos	2003–04	13	1	-	-	-	-	-	-
Panathinaikos	2004–05	20	1	-	-	-	-	-	-
Dinamo Zagreb	2005–06	22	1	-	-	-	-	-	-
Total		222	46	-	-	-	-	-	-

=== International goals ===
Results list Croatia's goal tally first.

No.	Date	Venue	Cap	Opponent	Score	Result	Competition
1	6 September 1997	Stadion Maksimir, Zagreb, Croatia	2	Bosnia and Herzegovina	2–1	3–2	1998 FIFA World Cup qualification

== Honours ==
Dinamo Zagreb

- Prva HNL: 1992–93, 1995–96, 1996–97, 1997–98, 2002–03, 2005–06
- Croatian Cup: 1996, 1997, 1998, 2002
- Croatian Supercup: 2002

Newcastle United

- FA Cup runner-up: 1998–99

Porto

- Taça de Portugal: 2001

Panathinaikos

- Super League Greece: 2003–04
- Greek Cup: 2003–04

== Orders ==
- Order of the Croatian Interlace - 1998
