= Stadion Varteks =

Football stadium in Croatia

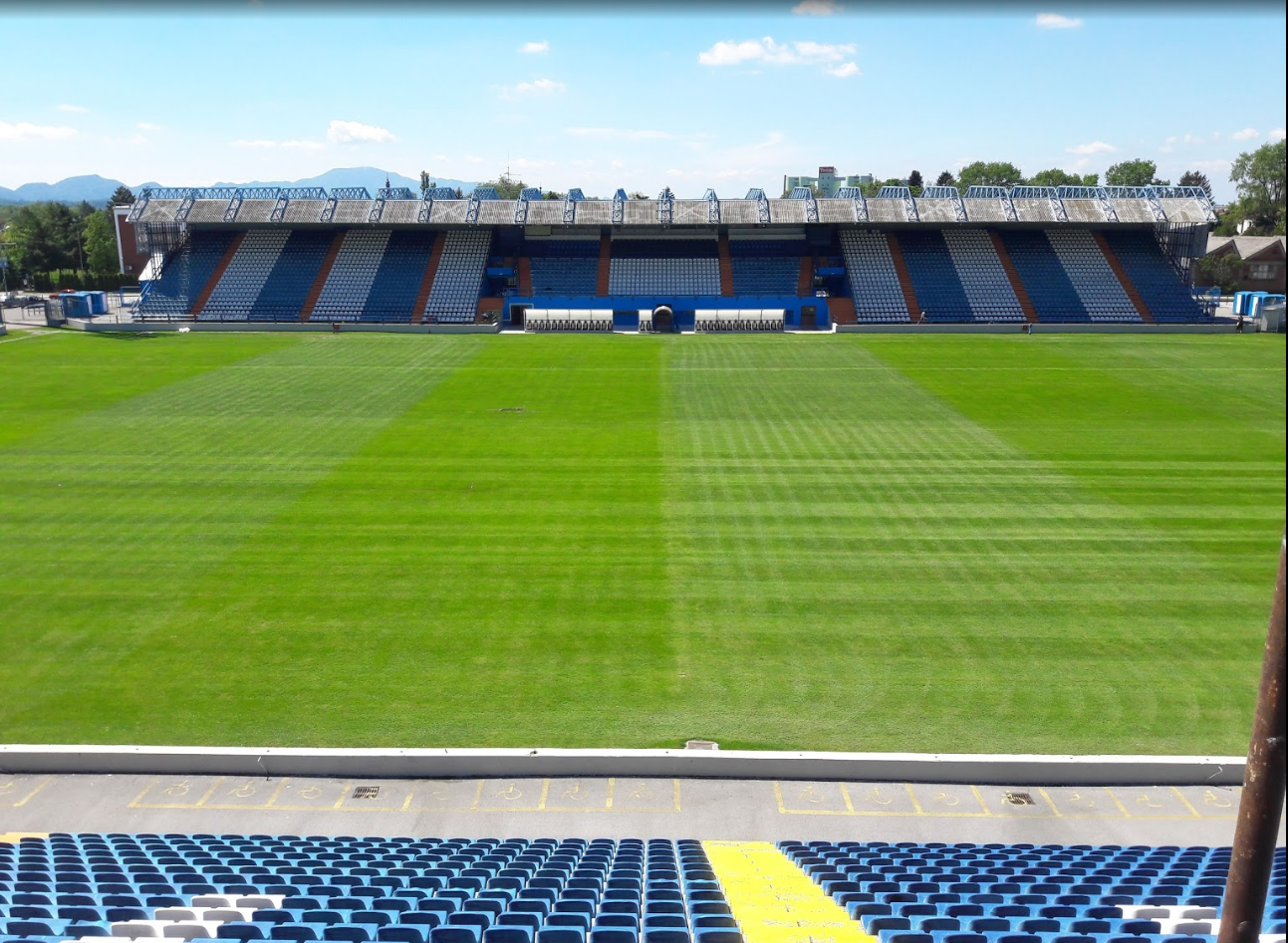
- Stadion Varteks in 2020
- Interactive map of Stadion Varteks
- Full name: Stadion Varteks
- Location: Varaždin, Croatia
- Coordinates: 46°17′36″N 16°20′39″E
- Operator: NK Varaždin
- Capacity: 8,818
- Surface: Grass
- Scoreboard: Yes
- Field size: 105 m x 68 m

Construction
- Built: 1931

Tenants
- NK Varaždin (1931–2015); NK Varteks (sometimes) (2011–); NK Varaždin (2012–)

Stadion Varteks is a football stadium in Varaždin, Croatia. It is the home ground of the Croatian Football League club NK Varaždin.

The stadium was built in 1931 as the home ground for a different NK Varaždin team, which overlapped with the current tenant with a similar name until its disbandment in 2015.

Stadion Varteks has undergone several renovations since 1931, and currently has an all-seating capacity of 8,818. It consists of three stands, with the main stand being the only one with a roof.

Since 1993, the Croatia national football team and the Croatia national under-21 football team have occasionally played their home games at the venue. For some of these games, and for some club-level UEFA competitions, rules against advertising of stadium sponsors has seen the generic name Gradski Stadion ("City Stadium") used.

The stadium is located near the Varteks clothing factory, and also features a Varteks fan shop and a café. From 1958 to 2010, the clothing factory was the main sponsor of the original NK Varaždin team, which changed its name to NK Varteks (no relation to the club founded in 2011) during those 52 seasons. Varteks clothing factory general manager Anđelko Herjavec also served as the president of the original NK Varteks, and was a member of the executive board of the Croatian Football Federation. After his death in a traffic accident in 2001, Stadion Varteks was unofficially renamed Stadion Anđelko Herjavec by fans of NK Varteks; this name still occasionally appears in media coverage.

On 31 May 2017, the stadium hosted the 2017 Croatian Football Cup final between Rijeka and Dinamo Zagreb.

== International matches ==
The stadium hosted several international matches of the Croatia national football team.

Date	Competition	Croatia vs.	Score	Attendance
26 March 1996	Friendly	Israel	2–0	3,684
25 April 2001	Friendly	Greece	2–2	9,390
2 June 2001	2002 FIFA World Cup qualifiers	San Marino	4–0	6,620
21 August 2002	Friendly	Wales	1–1	4,000
2 April 2003	Euro 2004 qualifiers	Andorra	2–0	8,290
18 August 2004	Friendly	Israel	1–0	8,000
7 June 2015	Friendly	Gibraltar	4–0	7,737
11 June 2019	Friendly	Tunisia	1–2	8,036
12 October 2025	2026 FIFA World Cup qualifiers	Gibraltar	3–0	7,579
