= Dražen Ladić =

Croatian footballer (born 1963)

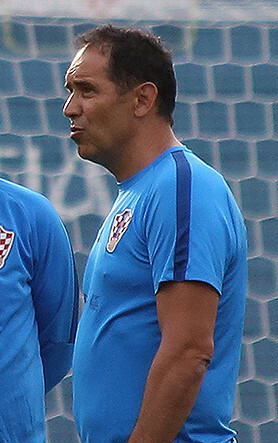
- Ladić during Croatia training session at the 2018 FIFA World Cup

Personal information
- Date of birth: 1 January 1963 (age 63)
- Place of birth: Čakovec, PR Croatia, Yugoslavia
- Height: 1.85 m (6 ft 1 in)
- Position: Goalkeeper

Team information
- Current team: Croatia (Analyst)

Youth career
- 1977–1980: Varteks

Senior career*
Years	Team	Apps	(Gls)
1980–1984	Varteks	15	(0)
1984–2000	Dinamo Zagreb	363	(1)
1984–1986	→ Iskra Bugojno (loan)	42	(5)
Total		420	(6)

International career
1991	Yugoslavia	2	(0)
1990–2000	Croatia	59	(0)

Managerial career
- 2002–2004: Croatia (goalkeeping coach)
- 2006–2011: Croatia U21
- 2013–2014: Al-Hilal (youth)
- 2014–2017: Al-Ain (assistant)
- 2018–: Croatia (Analyst)
Medal record
Men's football
Representing Croatia
FIFA World Cup
Runner-up	2018 Russia (as assistant)
Bronze medal – third place	1998 France (as player)
- * Club domestic league appearances and goals

Dražen Ladić (pronounced [drǎʒen lǎːdit͡ɕ]; born 1 January 1963) is a Croatian professional football coach and former player and who is the current Analyst of the Croatia national team.

== Playing career ==
=== Club ===
Ladić was born in Čakovec, but grew up in the nearby village of Gornji Hrašćan and started his career at NK Varteks in 1977, transferring to the club's senior squad in 1980. He left Varteks for Dinamo Zagreb in 1984, but the club decided to loan him to Iskra Bugojno for two seasons immediately after they signed him. He eventually made his debut for Dinamo in July 1986 and stayed at the club until the end of his playing career nearly 14 years later, collecting a record-holding total of 802 appearances in official matches.

During his time at the club, Ladić also played in several matches of both the UEFA Champions League and the UEFA Cup. In 1997, he notably saved a penalty kick in Dinamo Zagreb's home match against Partizan Belgrade in the first qualifying round for the UEFA Champions League, which they won 5–0. The Dinamo team continued to compete in the UEFA Cup after an unlucky 4-3 defeat on aggregate in the last minute of extra time against Newcastle United in the second qualifying round for the UEFA Champions League and got all the way to the third round, where they lost 2–1 on aggregate against Atlético Madrid.

In the autumn of 1998, Ladić debuted with Dinamo Zagreb in the group stages of the UEFA Champions League and played all six group matches before the club was eliminated from the competition by finishing second in their group, behind Olympiacos. The club repeated the success of qualifying for the UEFA Champions League group stages the following year, with Ladić making four group-stage appearances before being injured in the fourth group match against Sturm Graz and missing the final two matches before the team was eliminated from the competition after finishing last among the four teams in their group, one point behind the third-place Sturm Graz.

He soon recovered from the injury and continued to play for Dinamo until the end of the 1999–2000 season, making his last appearance for the club in the Croatian Cup finals against Hajduk Split on 16 May 2000 in Zagreb. With Dinamo, he won the Croatian First League champions title six times, in 1993, 1996, 1997, 1998, 1999 and 2000, as well as four Croatian Cup titles in 1994, 1996, 1997 and 1998.

=== International ===
In early 1990, Ladić was for the first time in his professional career a candidate to play for the national team of former Yugoslavia and was also mentioned to be part of their squad at the 1990 FIFA World Cup finals in Italy, but was eventually omitted from the squad without making his debut for the team that year. He eventually made his international debut for at the time newly founded Croatia national team in their first international match, a friendly against the United States on 17 October 1990 in Zagreb. After winning his first two caps for Croatia, Ladić nevertheless managed to make his international debut for Yugoslavia as well. He appeared in two matches, playing all 90 minutes in a friendly against Turkey on 27 February 1991 in İzmir and being the team's substitute goalkeeper in the last 25 minutes of a Euro 1992 qualifier against the Faroe Islands on 16 May 1991 in Belgrade. The match against the Faroes was also the last where Croatian footballers have played in the Yugoslavia national team.

Ladić went on to become the first-choice goalkeeper of the Croatia national team throughout the 1990s and won a total of 59 international caps before he retired in May 2000. His competitive debut for the Croatia national team came in the team's first qualifying match for the UEFA Euro 1996 against Estonia on 4 September 1994 in Tallinn. He went on to make nine out of possible ten appearances in that qualifying campaign, only missing the team's away match against Ukraine due to a one-match suspension for a red card received in the previous home match against Slovenia. He was also the team's starting goalkeeper at the Euro 1996 finals in England, making three out of possible four appearances and only missing the final group match against Portugal where Croatia started to play with seven players who were normally left on the bench. Croatia was eliminated from the tournament in the quarterfinals after losing 2–1 to Germany.

Ladić was also the first-choice goalkeeper during the Croatia national team's qualifying campaign for the 1998 FIFA World Cup and appeared in seven out of possible ten matches, but is mostly remembered from this period for his two blunders that he made during the qualifying campaign. The first happened to him in the team's home match against Denmark, when he conceded a bizarre goal after misjudging the path of Brian Laudrup's cross due to strong wind deflecting the ball and allowing Denmark to get an equaliser in the final ten minutes of the match. The incident saw Croatia losing two possibly crucial points after the match ended in a 1–1 draw. The second blunder was when he scored an own goal that put the Bosnia and Herzegovina team 1–0 up in another Croatia's home match, but the team eventually managed to get all three points with a tough 3–2 victory. Croatia eventually qualified for the finals after beating Ukraine 3–1 on aggregate in the play-offs, without Ladić playing in the second leg.

Despite Ladić's solid performances for Dinamo Zagreb in the European competition in 1997, his two blunders for the national team were still remembered by many people and made them sceptical when he was chosen as the Croatia national team's starting goalkeeper at the 1998 World Cup finals in France. However, he showed really good shape at the tournament and already distinguished himself in the second group match against Japan with a great save of Masashi Nakayama's shot in a one-on-one situation. He once again attracted the attention in the quarterfinals against Germany by saving a header and a volley from Oliver Bierhoff at close range, helping the Croatian team to record a surprisingly convincing 3–0 victory over the highly favoured German side. In the semifinals, he was helpless against two Lilian Thuram's goals that gave France a 2–1 victory and a place in the Final, but once again performed well in the third-place match against the Netherlands, clearing several promising goalscoring chances from the Dutch side and conceding only an unstoppable shot from Boudewijn Zenden for the 1–1 equaliser. Croatia won the match 2–1 in the end and was awarded with bronze medals in their very first World Cup appearance since the country's independence. Ladić was seen by many as one of the three best goalkeepers of the tournament. He appeared in all of the team's seven matches.

Despite initially announcing his withdrawal from the national team following the 1998 FIFA World Cup, Ladić later continued to play for Croatia in the Euro 2000 qualifying and made seven out of possible eight appearances, eventually ending his international career after the final qualifying match against Yugoslavia on 9 October 1999 and Croatia's failure to qualify for the final tournament.

He briefly returned to the Croatia national team for their friendly match against France on 28 May 2000 in Zagreb to make the final appearance of his career, symbolically appearing in the opening ten minutes of the match. As this was his 59th match for the Croatia national team, he played it with an otherwise unusual shirt number 59. At age 37 and five months, he became the oldest player in the history of Croatia.

== Managerial career ==
When Otto Barić took the charge of the Croatia national team in 2002, Ladić was appointed goalkeeping coach in his coaching staff. He left the post following the UEFA Euro 2004 finals in Portugal, along with the rest of the staff, as their contracts expired after the tournament and were not renewed following Croatia's failure to reach the quarter-finals.

On 9 August 2006, Ladić was appointed the head coach of the Croatia national under-21 team, replacing Slaven Bilić, who was appointed the head coach of the country's senior national team at the time.

=== Car wreck and sacking ===
In the early morning of 5 September 2010, hours after an under-21 international between Serbia and Croatia, Ladić was involved in a car wreck when the Mercedes-Benz E-Class he was driving, collided with a Renault Clio at a Zagreb road intersection. Both cars were damaged beyond repair and three passengers in the Renault sustained serious injuries. Ladić escaped the wreck unhurt. Some eyewitnesses of the wreck accused Ladić of a red light violation, which he denied.

He was removed from his position in January 2011, when the Croatian Football Federation accused him of falsifying insurance documents following the car wreck. However, within the federation there were, and still are, others who have been charged of felonies and have not been removed from their positions, sparking corruption claims within the media.

=== Return to Croatia ===
In March 2018, Ladić joined Croatia's coaching staff under the manager Zlatko Dalić, as his assistant coach.

== Honours ==
=== Player ===
Iskra Bugojno

- Yugoslav Second League – West: 1983–84
- Mitropa Cup: 1985

Dinamo Zagreb

- Prva HNL (6): 1992–93, 1995–96, 1996–97, 1997–98, 1998–99, 1999–2000
- Croatian Cup: 1994, 1996, 1997, 1998

=== Coach ===
Croatia

- FIFA World Cup runner-up: 2018
- FIFA World Cup third place: 1998

=== Individual ===
- Franjo Bučar State Award for Sport: 1998

=== Orders ===
- Order of Danica Hrvatska with face of Franjo Bučar: 1995
- Order of the Croatian Trefoil: 1998
