= 2010–11 Croatian First Football League =

T-Com Prva HNL
- Season: 2010–11
- Champions: Dinamo Zagreb; 13th Croatian title 17th domestic title
- Relegated: Hrvatski Dragovoljac
- Champions League: Dinamo Zagreb
- Europa League: Hajduk Split; RNK Split; Varaždin
- Matches: 240
- Goals: 531 (2.21 per match)
- Top goalscorer: Ivan Krstanović (19)
- Biggest home win: Hajduk Split 6–1 Istra 1961; Inter Zaprešić 5–0 Lokomotiva
- Biggest away win: Hrvatski Dragovoljac 0–6 Dinamo Zagreb
- Highest scoring: Hajduk Split 6–1 Istra 1961
- Average attendance: 1,893

The 2010–11 Croatian First Football League season (also known as 1. HNL; officially styled as T-Com Prva HNL for sponsorship reasons) was the 20th edition of the Croatian First Football League, the national championship for men's association football teams in Croatia, since its establishment in 1992. It began on 23 July 2010 and ended on 21 May 2011.

Dinamo Zagreb successfully defended its 2010 title earning their 12th successive championship title in 2011 (and fifth consecutive title).

== Format ==
Amid a considerable amount of criticism, the Association of Prva HNL Clubs had decided to expand the league from 12 to 16 clubs for the 2009–10 season. However, while the league format is regulated by the association of member clubs, each club must also obtain a football licence for top-flight competitions issued by the Croatian Football Federation and which applies criteria prescribed by UEFA, which are mainly concerned with the standard of their grounds and clubs' financial stability.

On 5 April 2010 only four clubs had met the requirements needed for these licenses – Dinamo Zagreb, Inter Zaprešić, Slaven Belupo and NK Zagreb. Clubs whose requests were rejected were allowed to appeal by 15 April, and the licensing department of the Croatian Football Federation was required to officially respond to these appeals by 3 May 2010.

In addition to this, only four Druga HNL clubs had officially requested a license, e.g. only four clubs expressed interest in competing in the 2010–11 Prva HNL in case they win promotion – RNK Split, Hrvatski dragovoljac, Solin and Mosor. According to the official Prva HNL statute at the time, if less than 16 clubs managed to obtain licenses by the beginning of the 2010–11 season, the format would be automatically reduced to 12 clubs. In such a scenario the five bottom-placed teams from the previous season would be relegated and only the winners of the Druga HNL would get promoted to top level.

On 6 May 2010 the Croatian Football Federation announced that, after the appeals had been resolved, a total of 16 clubs were granted top level licences:

- Cibalia
- Croatia Sesvete (finished 16th)
- Dinamo Zagreb
- Hajduk Split
- Hrvatski Dragovoljac (2. HNL)
- Inter Zaprešić
- Istra 1961
- Karlovac
- Lokomotiva
- Osijek
- Rijeka
- Šibenik
- Slaven Belupo
- RNK Split (2. HNL)
- Zadar
- NK Zagreb (finished 14th)

(Note: Clubs listed in italics obtained licences for grounds owned by other clubs as their own grounds were found unsuitable for top level matches.)

Prva HNL teams Međimurje and Varteks were not granted licences, due to financial difficulties at those clubs and accumulated debts to employees and players, with Varteks owing some 550,000 kuna (€76,000) and Međimurje 90,000 kuna (€12,500).

Since a total of 16 clubs were granted licences, including Croatia Sesvete who must be relegated at the end of the previous season, the retention of the 16-club format was in question for the 2010–11 season. It was also announced that the licensing process had officially ended on 1 May 2010. Međimurje, Varteks and other clubs which failed to get licences were allowed to try to obtain them through arbitration, and the process had to be completed by 31 May 2010, when the Croatian Football Federation was required to submit the list of top-flight clubs for the 2010–11 season to UEFA. On 21 May 2010 it was announced that Varteks and Međimurje were granted top level licences for next season. This meant that the 16-club format would be retained in the 2010–11 season.

Also, in June, NK Varteks changed their name to NK Varaždin because their main sponsor, fashion company Varteks, were not capable of sponsoring the club any longer due to its own financial troubles.

=== Future format changes ===
On 5 July 2010 the CFF Executive Committee reached a decision, (confirmed by the CFF Assembly on 14 July 2010), to reduce the number of teams in Prva HNL. The league will be reduced to 12 teams in the 2011–12 season, and then to 10 team format, expected to be introduced for either the 2012–13 or 2013–14 season. That means that the number of relegation spots was increased from 3 to 5 for the current 2010–11 season, and only the 2010–11 Druga HNL champions will be promoted. However, CFF Assembly on 17 December 2010 delayed the execution of this changes by one year. Instead, the league will stay at 16 teams with only the last three teams being relegated and the first three teams from 2010 to 2011 Druga HNL earning promotion (if they are granted with top level license). In case of 16 teams not acquiring top level license, format with 12 teams will be applied.

On 4 April 2011, CFF announced that the first stage of licensing procedure for 2011–12 season was completed. For the 2011–12 Prva HNL, only eight clubs were issued a top level license: Dinamo Zagreb, Hajduk Split, Inter Zaprešić, Istra 1961, Lokomotiva, Slaven Belupo, Varaždin and NK Zagreb. Out of these eight, only Lokomotiva and NK Zagreb weren't issued a license for participating in UEFA competitions. In the second stage of licensing procedure clubs that didn't get a license appealed on the decision and provided new facts and arguments. On 4 May 2011, it was announced that all remaining Prva HNL clubs were granted top level license. Additionally, Cibalia, Rijeka and RNK Split obtained a license for UEFA competitions. Only three teams from Druga HNL acquired the top level license: Dugopolje, Gorica and Lučko, where the latter two are set to play outside of their home venues.

The club that accepts participation in Prva HNL or Druga HNL in 2011–12 season, and has secured that right on terms of ranking and acquired license, must confirm their participation in written form no later than 6 June 2011. If a club doesn't submit such a claim or backs out later, they will be demoted to county league. The 2011–12 Prva HNL season staredt on 23 July 2011.

== Teams ==
Although the bottom three clubs should have been relegated at the end of the 2009–10 season, problems with licensing have reduced this number. However, the Prva HNL Statute explicitly states that the bottom-placed team must be relegated, which will be Croatia Sesvete. Since only two second division clubs met the requirements for top-level football, 14th-placed NK Zagreb will not be relegated and the 15th-placed club Međimurje will be replaced with Hrvatski Dragovoljac, the third-placed team in Druga HNL.

2009–10 Druga HNL winners RNK Split have secured a promotion spot in the on 2 May 2010. This will mark their return to top flight after 49 years, having been relegated from the 1960–61 Yugoslav First League. Hrvatski Dragovoljac was returned to Prva HNL after spending 9 years in lower levels, as their last top-flight spell had ended at the end of the 2001–02 season.

=== Stadia and locations ===
The following is the updated list of stadia for which top level licences have been obtained as of 21 May 2010. Five out of the eighteen licensed clubs had obtained licences to use other clubs' stadia as their own grounds had been found unsuitable for top flight matches but only Lokomotiva will end the season using stadium of other club because Međimurje dropt out to second division, RNK Split was given permission to play their home games at their own stadion, Istra 1961 was given permission to play their home games in their home town until their own stadium will be finished with renovation, and Hrvatski Dragovoljac is also waiting for its own stadium to be finished with renovation.

Just before the start of the season Istra 1961 was given permission to play their home games at the Stadion Veruda in Pula until the end of renovation of its own Stadion Aldo Drosina in Pula. They will play their first game at Stadion Aldo Drosina in February in 19. round against Dragovoljac. Originally, they were supposed to play their home games at the Kantrida stadium in Rijeka. Before their first home game RNK Split was given permission to play their home games at their own Stadion Park mladeži in Split. Originally, they were supposed to play their home games at the Poljud stadium in Split. Before their first home game Hrvatski Dragovoljac was given permission to play their home games at stadium in Kranjčevićeva in Zagreb where they continued playing their home games until renovation of their own Stadion NŠC Stjepan Spajić stadium ended. They have played their first home game at their own stadium in 18. round against Rijeka. Originally, they were supposed to play their home games at the Maksimir stadium in Zagreb.

Locations of teams in 2010–11 Prva HNL

Stadium	City	Home club	Licensed club(s)	Capacity
Maksimir	Zagreb	Dinamo Zagreb	Lokomotiva	38,923
Poljud	Split	Hajduk Split		35,000
Gradski vrt	Osijek	Osijek		19,500
Branko Čavlović-Čavlek	Karlovac	Karlovac		12,000
Varteks	Varaždin	Varaždin		10,800
Kantrida	Rijeka	Rijeka		10,275
Aldo Drosina	Pula	Istra 1961		10,000
Stadion HNK Cibalia	Vinkovci	Cibalia		9,920
Kranjčevićeva	Zagreb	NK Zagreb		8,850
Šubićevac	Šibenik	Šibenik		8,000
Park mladeži	Split	RNK Split		8,000
Stanovi	Zadar	Zadar		5,860
NŠC Stjepan Spajić	Zagreb	Hrvatski Dragovoljac		5,000
ŠRC Zaprešić	Zaprešić	Inter Zaprešić		4,528
Gradski stadion	Koprivnica	Slaven Belupo		4,000

=== Personnel and kits ===
As of 26 May 2011

Team	Manager	Captain	Kit manufacturer	Shirt sponsor
Cibalia	(Croatia) Stanko Mršić	(Croatia) Mario Lučić	Jako	Croatia Osiguranje
Dinamo Zagreb	(Croatia) Krunoslav Jurčić	(Croatia) Igor Bišćan	Diadora	INA
Hajduk Split	(Croatia) Ante Miše	(Croatia) Srđan Andrić	Umbro	
Hrvatski Dragovoljac	(Croatia) Davor Mladina	(Croatia) Danijel Zlatar	Jako	Croatia Osiguranje
Inter Zaprešić	(Croatia) Ilija Lončarević	(Croatia) Tomislav Šarić	Legea	Zaprešić
Istra 1961	(Croatia) Igor Pamić	(Croatia) Dalibor Pauletić	Legea	
Karlovac	(Croatia) Srećko Lušić	(Croatia) Matija Štefančić	Macron	HS Produkt
Lokomotiva	(Croatia) Marijo Tot	(Croatia) Željko Sopić	Legea	
Osijek	(Croatia) Vlado Bilić	(Croatia) Ivo Smoje	Kappa	Croatia Osiguranje
Rijeka	(Croatia) Elvis Scoria	(Croatia) Fausto Budicin	Jako	Croatia Osiguranje
Slaven Belupo	(Croatia) Roy Ferenčina	(Croatia) Elvis Kokalović	Adidas	Belupo
RNK Split	(Croatia) Ivan Katalinić	(Croatia) Andrija Vuković	Jako	Skladgradnja
Šibenik	(Croatia) Vjekoslav Lokica	(Croatia) Goran Blažević	Jako	Zagrebačka banka
Varaždin	(Croatia) Samir Toplak	(Croatia) Roberto Punčec	Legea	Croatia Osiguranje
Zadar	(Croatia) Dalibor Zebić	(Croatia) Jakov Surać	Jako	
NK Zagreb	(Croatia) Luka Pavlović	(Croatia) Mario Tokić	Legea	

=== Managerial changes ===
Team	Outgoing manager	Manner of departure	Date of vacancy	Replaced by	Date of appointment	Position in table
NK Zagreb	(Croatia) Igor Štimac	Resigned	13 May 2010	(Croatia) Ivo Šušak	27 May 2010	Pre-season
Dinamo Zagreb	(Croatia) Krunoslav Jurčić	Resigned	19 May 2010	(Croatia) Velimir Zajec	25 May 2010	Pre-season
Istra 1961	(Croatia) Zoran Vulić	Sacked	23 May 2010	(Croatia) Ante Miše	23 May 2010	Pre-season
RNK Split	(Croatia) Tonći Bašić	Removed from position	2 June 2010	(Croatia) Ivan Katalinić	2 June 2010	Pre-season
Slaven Belupo	(Croatia) Zlatko Dalić	Mutual consent	2 June 2010	(Croatia) Mile Petković	7 June 2010	Pre-season
Šibenik	(Croatia) Branko Karačić	Resigned	23 July 2010	(Croatia) Vjekoslav Lokica	11 August 2010	Pre-season
Istra 1961	(Croatia) Ante Miše	Sacked	3 August 2010	(Croatia) Robert Jarni	4 August 2010	16th
Dinamo Zagreb	(Croatia) Velimir Zajec	Sacked	9 August 2010	(Bosnia and Herzegovina) Vahid Halilhodžić	17 August 2010	8th
Osijek	(Croatia) Tomislav Steinbrückner	Sacked	16 August 2010	(Croatia) Branko Karačić	16 August 2010	12th
NK Zagreb	(Croatia) Ivo Šušak	Mutual consent	14 September 2010	(Croatia) Luka Pavlović	14 September 2010	5th
Istra 1961	(Croatia) Robert Jarni	Resigned	19 September 2010	(Croatia) Zoran Vulić	5 October 2010	15th
Hrvatski Dragovoljac	(Croatia) Davor Mladina	Resigned	19 September 2010	(Croatia) Damir Biškup	19 September 2010	16th
Lokomotiva	(Croatia) Roy Ferenčina	Mutual consent	2 October 2010	(Serbia) Ljupko Petrović	2 October 2010	12th
Hrvatski Dragovoljac	(Croatia) Damir Biškup	Removed from position	3 October 2010	(Croatia) Ivan Pudar	3 October 2010	15th
Hajduk Split	(Croatia) Stanko Poklepović	Sacked	28 October 2010	(Croatia) Goran Vučević	28 December 2010	2nd
Rijeka	(Croatia) Nenad Gračan	Mutual consent	6 November 2010	(Croatia) Elvis Scoria	8 November 2010	6th
Hrvatski Dragovoljac	(Croatia) Ivan Pudar	Mutual consent	7 November 2010	(Croatia) Davor Mladina	7 November 2010	16th
Slaven Belupo	(Croatia) Mile Petković	Resigned	13 March 2011	(Croatia) Roy Ferenčina	14 March 2011	11th
Lokomotiva	(Serbia) Ljupko Petrović	Removed from position	14 March 2011	(Croatia) Krunoslav Jurčić	14 March 2011	14th
Istra 1961	(Croatia) Zoran Vulić	Resigned	21 March 2011	(Croatia) Igor Pamić	29 March 2011	15th
Karlovac	(Croatia) Igor Pamić	Resigned	23 March 2011	(Croatia) Srećko Lušić	23 March 2011	6th
Hajduk Split	(Croatia) Goran Vučević	Mutual consent	16 April 2011	(Croatia) Ante Miše	18 April 2011	2nd
Osijek	(Croatia) Branko Karačić	Removed from position	2 May 2011	(Croatia) Vlado Bilić	9 May 2011	9th
Dinamo Zagreb	(Bosnia and Herzegovina) Vahid Halilhodžić	Resigned	6 May 2011	(Croatia) Krunoslav Jurčić	26 May 2011	1st

== League table ==
Pos	Team	Pld	W	D	L	GF	GA	GD	Pts	Qualification or relegation
1	Dinamo Zagreb (C)	30	22	6	2	52	12	+40	72	Qualification to Champions League second qualifying round
2	Hajduk Split	30	16	7	7	54	32	+22	55	Qualification to Europa League third qualifying round
3	RNK Split	30	16	5	9	38	22	+16	53	Qualification to Europa League second qualifying round
4	Cibalia	30	12	8	10	33	24	+9	44	
5	Inter Zaprešić	30	12	6	12	31	35	−4	42	
6	Karlovac	30	11	8	11	25	27	−2	41	
7	Slaven Belupo	30	10	10	10	34	30	+4	40	
8	Osijek	30	9	12	9	31	29	+2	39	
9	Rijeka	30	9	12	9	29	35	−6	39	
10	Zadar	30	11	5	14	31	34	−3	38	
11	Varaždin	30	9	9	12	32	38	−6	36	Qualification to Europa League first qualifying round (Note: Champions League-bound Dinamo Zagreb won the 2010–11 Croatian Cup, so cup runners-up Varaždin will enter the first qualifying round of UEFA Europa League.)
12	Šibenik	30	8	11	11	37	38	−1	35	
13	NK Zagreb	30	9	8	13	32	39	−7	35	
14	Lokomotiva	30	8	9	13	24	37	−13	33	
15	Istra 1961	30	9	4	17	24	44	−20	31	
16	Hrvatski Dragovoljac (R)	30	5	8	17	24	55	−31	23	Relegation to Croatian Second Football League (Note: Despite finishing 14th NK Lokomotiva avoided relegation as only two second level clubs who had been granted first division licences by the Croatian Football Federation (HNS) managed to finish the season within top five places (Gorica and Lučko finished top two and the only remaining licensed club Dugopolje failed to clinch promotion as they ended the season in 8th place). However, on 20 June 2011 HNS rescinded Gorica's license which meant that only the last-placed Hrvatski Dragovoljac were replaced by Lučko, with 15th-placed Istra 1961 remaining in top flight as well.)

Source: Prva-HNL.hr
Rules for classification: 1) points; 2) goal difference; 3) number of goals scored.
For deciding champions, qualification to UEFA Europa League and relegation: 1st points; 2nd head-to-head points; 3rd head-to-head goal difference; 4th head-to-head away goals scored
(C) Champions; (R) Relegated

== Results ==
Home \ Away	DIN	HAJ	SPL	CIB	INT	KAR	SLA	OSI	RIJ	ZAD	VAR	ŠIB	ZAG	LOK	IST	HRD
Dinamo Zagreb		2–0	1–1	2–0	1–0	4–2	0–0	1–0	1–2	1–0	1–1	1–0	1–0	1–0	4–0	4–1
Hajduk Split	1–1		3–1	1–2	0–0	2–3	1–0	2–1	1–1	4–1	2–0	2–0	4–1	2–0	6–1	2–1
RNK Split	0–1	1–1		2–1	1–1	0–1	3–0	1–0	2–3	3–2	4–0	1–0	2–0	1–0	2–0	1–0
Cibalia	0–1	2–1	0–1		1–0	1–0	1–2	3–0	4–1	0–0	2–0	3–1	2–2	2–1	1–0	3–0
Inter Zaprešić	0–3	0–5	0–2	2–1		0–0	0–1	1–0	1–1	1–0	2–0	3–2	0–2	5–0	3–1	3–2
Karlovac	0–1	1–1	1–0	0–0	3–0		1–0	1–0	0–1	1–0	1–0	1–1	2–1	1–2	1–1	2–0
Slaven Belupo	0–2	1–2	1–2	1–1	0–0	4–0		2–1	0–1	2–0	1–0	1–0	1–2	2–2	2–1	3–0
Osijek	1–3	2–2	1–0	1–0	1–0	0–0	1–1		0–0	3–2	0–0	3–1	0–0	0–0	2–1	0–0
Rijeka	0–2	0–1	1–0	0–0	0–2	0–0	2–1	1–5		0–2	1–1	1–1	1–1	3–0	2–0	3–0
Zadar	0–0	0–2	1–0	0–0	1–0	2–0	1–1	1–1	1–0		3–0	1–4	2–1	1–0	2–0	1–0
Varaždin	1–1	3–0	0–0	2–1	3–0	1–0	1–1	2–4	3–0	2–1		2–2	0–0	0–1	2–1	2–0
Šibenik	0–2	1–3	3–0	0–0	0–1	2–1	3–3	2–1	1–1	2–0	1–0		0–1	0–0	2–2	2–2
NK Zagreb	0–1	2–2	0–2	0–2	2–1	1–2	1–3	0–0	3–1	1–0	2–2	1–1		3–1	0–1	0–1
Lokomotiva	0–2	0–1	0–0	2–0	2–4	0–0	0–0	0–0	0–0	3–2	1–2	0–0	2–0		1–0	3–2
Istra 1961	2–1	2–0	0–1	1–0	0–1	1–0	1–0	1–2	0–0	1–0	2–0	1–4	0–2	2–1		0–1
Hrvatski Dragovoljac	0–6	2–0	0–4	0–0	0–0	1–0	0–0	1–1	2–2	1–4	3–2	0–1	2–3	1–2	1–1	

Source: Prva-HNL.hr
Legend: Blue = home team win; Yellow = draw; Red = away team win.

== Top goalscorers ==
As of 21 May 2011; Source: Prva-HNL

Rank	Player	Club	Goals
1	(Bosnia and Herzegovina) Ivan Krstanović	NK Zagreb	19
2	(Croatia) Ante Vukušić	Hajduk Split	14
3	(Bosnia and Herzegovina) Mehmed Alispahić	Šibenik	11
3	(Croatia) Nino Bule	Lokomotiva	11
3	(Croatia) Dino Kresinger	Cibalia	11
6	(Brazil) Sammir	Dinamo Zagreb	10
6	(Croatia) Ivan Santini	Zadar	10
8	(Bosnia and Herzegovina) Mladen Bartolović	Cibalia	8
8	(Montenegro) Fatos Bećiraj	Dinamo Zagreb	8
8	(Croatia) Leon Benko	Slaven Belupo	8

== Transfers ==
- List of Croatian football transfers summer 2010

== Attendances ==
#	Club	Average
1	Hajduk	6,933
2	Dinamo Zagreb	3,560
3	Osijek	2,500
4	Rijeka	2,240
5	Radnički	2,007
6	Cibalia	1,880
7	Istra	1,880
8	Slaven	1,767
9	Zadar	1,713
10	Šibenik	1,500
11	Karlovac	1,470
12	Varteks	1,200
13	Zaprešić	1,060
14	Zagreb	980
15	Hrvatski	793
16	Lokomotiva	377

== See also ==
- 2010 Croatian Football Super Cup
- 2010–11 Croatian Football Cup
- 2010–11 Croatian Second Football League
