= 1999 Croatian Football Cup final =

- Event: 1998–99 Croatian Cup
Cibalia	Osijek
1	2
- After extra time
- Date: 30 May 1999
- Venue: Stadion Maksimir, Zagreb
- Man of the Match: Davor Lasić (Osijek)
- Referee: Reno Sinovčić (Zadar)
- Attendance: 7,000
- Weather: Clear

The 1999 Croatian Cup final was a one-legged affair played between the Slavonian rivals Cibalia and Osijek. The leg was played in Zagreb on 30 May 1999.

Osijek won the trophy with a result of 2–1.

== Road to the final ==
Cibalia		Round	Osijek	
Opponent	Result		Opponent	Result
Pazinka	6–0	First round	Mosor	1–0
Rijeka	1–0	Second round	Hrvatski Dragovoljac	3–1
Belišće	4–0	Quarter-finals	Varteks	1–2
Belišće	3–0	Quarter-finals	Varteks	3–0
Hajduk Split	2–1	Semi-finals	Slaven Belupo	1–0
Hajduk Split	1–2 (6–5 p)	Semi-finals	Slaven Belupo	0–0

== Final ==
30 May 1999
18:00

Cibalia	1–2 (a.e.t.)	Osijek
Jurić 35'	Report (in Croatian)	Mitu 90+3'; Lasić 97'

Stadion Maksimir, Zagreb
Attendance: 7,000
Referee: Reno Sinovčić (Zadar)

CIBALIA:
GK	1	(Bosnia and Herzegovina) Miralem Ibrahimović	(yellow card) 2'
DF	2	(Croatia) Jure Jurić		(substituted off) 61'
DF	4	(Croatia) Ivan Ravlić	(yellow card) 45' (yellow-red card) 65'
DF	5	(Croatia) Danijel Bogdan
MF	3	(Croatia) Dalibor Bognar
MF	6	(Croatia) Antun Andričević	(yellow card) 19'
MF	7	(Croatia) Goran Meštrović (c)	(yellow card) 28'	(substituted off) 65'
MF	8	(Croatia) Darko Raić-Sudar	(yellow card) 49' (yellow-red card) 49'
MF	9	(Croatia) Ivan Maroslavac
FW	10	(Croatia) Ivan Bošnjak
FW	11	(Croatia) Renato Jurčec		(substituted off) 35'
Substitutes:
MF	17	(Croatia) Miroslav Bojko		(substituted on) 35'
MF	15	(Croatia) Leonard Bisaku		(substituted on) 61'
DF	13	(Croatia) Radoslav Gusić		(substituted on) 65'
Manager:
(Croatia) Srećko Lušić

OSIJEK:
GK	30	(Croatia) Mario Galinović
DF	4	(Croatia) Damir Vuica		(substituted off) 46'
DF	6	(Croatia) Ivo Ergović	(yellow card) 25'
DF	22	(Croatia) Ivica Beljan
MF	3	(Croatia) Davor Lasić
MF	10	(Bosnia and Herzegovina) Bakir Beširević
MF	17	(Croatia) Stjepan Vranješ (c)
MF	23	(Croatia) Borimir Perković
MF	27	(Croatia) Josip Gašpar
FW	8	(Croatia) Mario Prišć		(substituted off) 71'
FW	14	(Croatia) Stanko Bubalo		(substituted off) 64'
Substitutes:
MF	20	(Croatia) Jurica Vranješ		(substituted on) 46'
FW	11	(Romania) Dumitru Mitu		(substituted on) 64'
MF	9	(Croatia) Jakov Surać		(substituted on) 71'
Manager:
(Croatia) Stanko Poklepović

Assistant referees:
Ivan Petek (Zaprešić)
Alojzije Šupraha (Kolan)

Match rules

- 90 minutes.
- 30 minutes of extra-time if necessary.
- Penalty shoot-out if scores still level.
- Seven named substitutes.
- Maximum of three substitutions.
