= 2023–24 Croatian Football League =

SuperSport Hrvatska nogometna liga
- Season: 2023–24
- Dates: 21 July 2023 – 25 May 2024
- Champions: Dinamo Zagreb
- Relegated: Rudeš
- Champions League: Dinamo Zagreb
- Europa League: Rijeka
- Conference League: Hajduk Split; Osijek
- Matches: 180
- Goals: 479 (2.66 per match)
- Top goalscorer: Ramón Miérez (18 goals)
- Biggest home win: Rijeka 6–0 Istra 1961 (6 August 2023)
- Biggest away win: Rudeš 1–5 Dinamo Zagreb (24 September 2023); Istra 1961 0–4 Lokomotiva (2 October 2023); Rudeš 0–4 Istra 1961 (11 November 2023)
- Highest scoring: Istra 1961 4–4 Osijek (13 August 2023)
- Longest winning run: 9 matches Dinamo Zagreb
- Longest unbeaten run: 14 matches Dinamo Zagreb
- Longest winless run: 24 matches Rudeš
- Longest losing run: 6 matches Rudeš
- Total attendance: 956,128
- Average attendance: 5,371

The 2023–24 Croatian Football League (officially SuperSport Hrvatska nogometna liga for sponsorship reasons) was the 33rd season of the Croatian top division football, the national championship for men's association football teams in Croatia, since its establishment in 1992. The season began on 21 July 2023.

== Teams ==
The league consisted of ten teams; the top nine teams from the previous season, and one team promoted from the Prva NL. 2022–23 Prva NL champions Rudeš were promoted and returned after a four-year absence, replacing the 2022–23 Croatian Football League bottom-placed team, Šibenik (relegated after three seasons in the top flight).

=== Stadia and locations ===
Dinamo Zagreb	Gorica	Hajduk Split	Istra 1961
Stadion Maksimir	Gradski stadion Velika Gorica	Stadion Poljud	Stadion Aldo Drosina
Capacity: 24,851	Capacity: 5,200	Capacity: 33,987	Capacity: 9,800
Lokomotiva	Locations of teams in 2023–24 HNL		Osijek
Stadion Kranjčevićeva	Locations of teams in 2023–24 HNL		Opus Arena
Capacity: 5,350	Locations of teams in 2023–24 HNL		Capacity: 13,005
Rijeka	Rudeš	Slaven Belupo	Varaždin
Stadion Rujevica	Stadion Kranjčevićeva	Stadion Ivan Kušek-Apaš	Stadion Varteks
Capacity: 8,191	Capacity: 5,350	Capacity: 3,054	Capacity: 8,818

Team	City	Stadium	Capacity	Ref.
Dinamo Zagreb	Zagreb	Maksimir	24,851	
Gorica	Velika Gorica	ŠRC Velika Gorica	5,200	
Hajduk Split	Split	Poljud	33,987	
Istra 1961	Pula	Stadion Aldo Drosina	9,800	
Lokomotiva	Zagreb	Kranjčevićeva^{1}	5,350	
Osijek	Osijek	Opus Arena	13,005	
Rijeka	Rijeka	Rujevica	8,191	
Rudeš	Zagreb	Kranjčevićeva^{1}	5,350	
Slaven Belupo	Koprivnica	Stadion Ivan Kušek-Apaš	3,054	
Varaždin	Varaždin	Stadion Varteks	8,818	

- ^{1} Lokomotiva and Rudeš host their home matches at Stadion Kranjčevićeva. The stadium is originally the home ground of fifth-level side NK Zagreb.

Rank	Counties of Croatia	Number of teams	Club(s)
1	City of Zagreb	3	Dinamo Zagreb, Lokomotiva, Rudeš
2	Istria	1	Istra 1961
2	Koprivnica-Križevci	1	Slaven Belupo
2	Osijek-Baranja	1	Osijek
2	Primorje-Gorski Kotar	1	Rijeka
2	Split-Dalmatia	1	Hajduk Split
2	Varaždin	1	Varaždin
2	Zagreb County	1	Gorica

=== Personnel and kits ===
Club	Manager	Captain	Kit manufacturer	Sponsors
Dinamo Zagreb	(Bosnia and Herzegovina) Sergej Jakirović	(North Macedonia) Arijan Ademi	Adidas	PSK
Gorica	(Croatia) Rajko Vidović	(Croatia) Filip Mrzljak	Alpas	Kömmerling
Hajduk Split	(Bosnia and Herzegovina) Jure Ivanković (caretaker)	(Croatia) Lovre Kalinić	Macron	Tommy
Istra 1961	(Italy) Paolo Tramezzani	(Croatia) Slavko Blagojević	Joma	Germania
Lokomotiva	(Croatia) Silvijo Čabraja	(Bosnia and Herzegovina) Mateo Marić	Macron	Favbet
Osijek	(Croatia) Ivo Smoje (caretaker)	(Croatia) Vedran Jugović	2Rule	Mészáros és Mészáros Kft.
Rijeka	(Croatia) Željko Sopić	(Croatia) Nediljko Labrović	Joma	Favbet
Rudeš	(Croatia) Davor Mladina	(Croatia) Mateo Pavlović	Adidas	Sava Osiguranje
Slaven Belupo	(Bosnia and Herzegovina) Ivan Radeljić	(Croatia) Tomislav Božić	Jako	Belupo
Varaždin	(Croatia) Mario Kovačević	(Croatia) Igor Postonjski	Capelli Sport	BURAI

=== Managerial changes ===
Team	Outgoing manager	Manner of departure	Date of vacancy	Replaced by	Date of appointment	Position in table
Slaven Belupo	(Croatia) Zoran Zekić	Contract expired	27 May 2023	(Netherlands) Ricardo Moniz	7 May 2023	Pre-season
Rudeš	(Croatia) Davor Mladina	Contract expired	5 June 2023	(Croatia) Robert Prosinečki	7 June 2023	Pre-season
Istra 1961	(Spain) Gonzalo Garcia	Mutual consent	7 June 2023	(Bosnia and Herzegovina) Mislav Karoglan	11 June 2023	Pre-season
Istra 1961	(Bosnia and Herzegovina) Mislav Karoglan	Sacked	9 August 2023	(Spain) David Català	13 August 2023	9th
Dinamo Zagreb	(Croatia) Igor Bišćan	Sacked	21 August 2023	(Bosnia and Herzegovina) Sergej Jakirović	21 August 2023	7th
Rijeka	(Bosnia and Herzegovina) Sergej Jakirović	Signed by Dinamo Zagreb	21 August 2023	(Croatia) Darko Raić-Sudar (caretaker)	22 August 2023	3rd
Gorica	(Croatia) Željko Sopić	Signed by Rijeka	23 August 2023	(Bosnia and Herzegovina) Mensur Mujdža (caretaker)	23 August 2023	5th
Rijeka	(Croatia) Darko Raić-Sudar (caretaker)	End of caretaker tenure	25 August 2023	(Croatia) Željko Sopić	25 August 2023	3rd
Gorica	(Bosnia and Herzegovina) Mensur Mujdža (caretaker)	Signing of Jeličić	30 August 2023	(Croatia) Dinko Jeličić	30 August 2023	6th
Rudeš	(Croatia) Robert Prosinečki	Sacked	3 September 2023	(Croatia) Toni Golem	5 September 2023	10th
Slaven Belupo	(Netherlands) Ricardo Moniz	Sacked	4 September 2023	(Croatia) Roy Ferenčina	5 September 2023	9th
Osijek	(Croatia) Stjepan Tomas	Sacked	3 October 2023	(Croatia) Ivo Smoje (caretaker)	3 October 2023	6th
Osijek	(Croatia) Ivo Smoje (caretaker)	Signing of Zekić	13 October 2023	(Croatia) Zoran Zekić	13 October 2023	5th
Hajduk Split	(Croatia) Ivan Leko	Mutual consent	23 October 2023	(Bosnia and Herzegovina) Mislav Karoglan	23 October 2023	2nd
Rudeš	(Croatia) Toni Golem	Mutual consent	12 November 2023	(Croatia) Ivan Mijač (caretaker)	17 November 2023	10th
Rudeš	(Croatia) Ivan Mijač (caretaker)	Signing of Mladina	6 December 2023	(Croatia) Davor Mladina	6 December 2023	10th
Istra 1961	(Spain) David Català	Sacked	7 February 2024	(Italy) Paolo Tramezzani	8 February 2024	8th
Gorica	(Croatia) Dinko Jeličić	Sacked	11 March 2024	(Bosnia and Herzegovina) Mensur Mujdža (caretaker)	11 March 2024	6th
Gorica	(Bosnia and Herzegovina) Mensur Mujdža (caretaker)	Signing of Vidović	18 March 2024	(Croatia) Rajko Vidović	18 March 2024	6th
Hajduk Split	(Bosnia and Herzegovina) Mislav Karoglan	Mutual consent	8 April 2024	(Bosnia and Herzegovina) Jure Ivanković (caretaker)	8 April 2024	3rd
Slaven Belupo	(Croatia) Roy Ferenčina	Sacked	9 April 2024	(Bosnia and Herzegovina) Ivan Radeljić	9 April 2024	9th
Osijek	(Croatia) Zoran Zekić	Sacked	20 May 2024	(Croatia) Ivo Smoje (caretaker)	20 May 2024	4th

== League table ==
Pos	Team	Pld	W	D	L	GF	GA	GD	Pts	Qualification or relegation
1	Dinamo Zagreb (C)	36	25	7	4	67	30	+37	82	Qualification to Champions League play-off round (Note: Since already qualified Real Madrid won the Champions League, Dinamo Zagreb was promoted to the Champions League play-off round as the champion with the highest coefficient in Champions League qualifying.)
2	Rijeka	36	23	5	8	69	30	+39	74	Qualification to Europa League second qualifying round (Note: The 2023–24 Croatian Football Cup winners qualified for the Europa League second qualifying round. Since the cup winners (Dinamo Zagreb) qualified for the Champions League, the Europa League spot was passed to the second-placed team, and the second Conference League second qualifying round spot was passed to the fourth-placed team.)
3	Hajduk Split	36	21	5	10	54	26	+28	68	Qualification to Conference League second qualifying round
4	Osijek	36	16	9	11	62	43	+19	57	Qualification to Conference League second qualifying round
5	Lokomotiva	36	12	15	9	52	45	+7	51	
6	Varaždin	36	10	12	14	39	47	−8	42	
7	Gorica	36	11	8	17	35	50	−15	41	
8	Istra 1961	36	10	11	15	36	54	−18	41	
9	Slaven Belupo	36	9	6	21	43	69	−26	33	
10	Rudeš (R)	36	1	6	29	22	85	−63	9	Relegation to First Football League

Source: SuperSport HNL
Rules for classification: 1) Points; 2) Head-to-head points; 3) Head-to-head goal difference; 4) Head-to-head goals scored (at home if two teams tied); 5) Goal difference; 6) Goals scored; 7) Play-off
(Note: Criteria 2-4 and 7 is only used if deciding champion, teams to international competition or teams for relegation and in that case criteria 6 will not be used).
(C) Champions; (R) Relegated

== Results ==
Each team plays home-and-away against every other team in the league twice, for a total of 36 matches each played.

Home \ Away	DIN	GOR	HAJ	IST	LOK	OSI	RIJ	RUD	SLA	VAR	DIN	GOR	HAJ	IST	LOK	OSI	RIJ	RUD	SLA	VAR
Dinamo Zagreb		0–0	1–2	3–0	2–1	2–1	2–1	1–0	3–0	2–1		2–0	0–0	4–1	0–3	1–0	1–0	3–3	5–2	1–0
Gorica	2–1		2–1	0–0	1–0	3–0	2–3	3–0	2–2	1–1	0–2		0–3	2–0	1–2	0–3	0–2	2–1	1–0	1–3
Hajduk Split	1–0	3–0		0–1	1–0	0–2	1–0	1–0	3–0	3–1	0–1	2–1		1–0	1–2	1–2	1–2	5–1	4–0	0–1
Istra 1961	0–3	0–1	0–2		0–4	4–4	1–1	0–0	2–0	2–0	0–1	0–0	1–1		0–0	1–0	0–2	2–1	3–0	2–0
Lokomotiva	2–2	1–1	1–1	1–1		2–2	1–1	1–0	1–3	3–3	0–1	1–1	2–5	3–0		1–1	3–1	3–0	2–1	0–0
Osijek	2–3	1–0	0–1	3–1	1–1		0–0	3–0	6–1	1–1	1–1	3–0	1–1	1–2	3–1		2–0	2–0	4–1	0–1
Rijeka	2–2	1–0	1–0	6–0	2–1	2–1		4–0	2–4	2–2	1–2	3–0	1–0	3–0	4–0	3–0		3–0	4–0	2–0
Rudeš	1–5	0–2	0–2	0–4	0–0	3–4	1–2		0–0	0–0	0–3	2–1	0–2	1–3	3–3	2–3	0–3		1–3	0–2
Slaven Belupo	0–2	0–0	0–1	2–2	0–1	1–0	0–1	3–2		3–2	2–3	4–1	0–1	1–1	2–3	0–1	0–1	4–0		0–1
Varaždin	1–1	1–0	1–2	1–0	0–0	2–2	0–2	2–0	2–2		0–1	2–4	1–1	2–2	0–2	0–2	3–1	1–0	1–2	

Source: SuperSport HNL (in Croatian)
Legend: Blue = home team win; Yellow = draw; Red = away team win.

== Statistics ==
=== Top scorers ===
As of 26 May 2024

Rank	Player	Club	Goals
1	(Argentina) Ramón Miérez	Osijek	18
2	(Croatia) Fran Brodić	Varaždin (7), Dinamo Zagreb (6)	13
3	(Croatia) Duje Čop	Lokomotiva	12
4	(Croatia) Niko Janković	Rijeka	11
4	(Croatia) Bruno Petković	Dinamo Zagreb	11
6	(Croatia) Marko Livaja	Hajduk Split	10
6	(Croatia) Benedik Mioč	Slaven Belupo	10
8	(Croatia) Marin Šotiček	Lokomotiva	8

== Annual awards ==
Award	Winner	Club
Player of the Season	(Croatia) Bruno Petković	Dinamo Zagreb
Manager of the Season	(Bosnia and Herzegovina) Sergej Jakirović	Dinamo Zagreb
Young Player of the Season	(Croatia) Martin Baturina	Dinamo Zagreb

Team of the Year
Goalkeeper	(Croatia) Nediljko Labrović (Rijeka)			
Defence	(North Macedonia) Stefan Ristovski (Dinamo Zagreb)	(Bosnia and Herzegovina) Stjepan Radeljić (Rijeka)	(Croatia) Niko Galešić (Rijeka)	(Croatia) Bruno Goda (Rijeka)
Midfield	(Croatia) Toni Fruk (Rijeka)	(Croatia) Josip Mišić (Dinamo Zagreb)		(Croatia) Martin Baturina (Dinamo Zagreb)
Attack	(Croatia) Bruno Petković (Dinamo Zagreb)	(Argentina) Ramón Miérez (Osijek)		(Croatia) Marko Pjaca (Rijeka)

== Attendances ==
#	Football club	Home games	Average attendance
1	Hajduk Split	18	18,873
2	Dinamo Zagreb	18	9,013
3	NK Osijek	18	7,418
4	HNK Rijeka	18	6,406
5	NK Varaždin	18	2,969
6	NK Istra 1961	18	2,603
7	HNK Gorica	18	1,830
8	Lokomotiva Zagreb	18	1,624
9	Slaven Belupo	18	1,280
10	NK Rudeš	18	1,143

Source: European Football Statistics
