= 2015–16 Croatian Second Football League =

Croatian Second Football League
- Season: 2015–16
- Champions: Cibalia
- Promoted: Cibalia
- Relegated: Segesta; Zadar
- Matches: 198
- Goals: 508 (2.57 per match)
- Top goalscorer: Frane Vitaić (15)
- Biggest home win: H. Dragovoljac 5–0 Zadar; Šibenik 5–0 Zadar; Lučko 5–0 Zadar
- Biggest away win: Zadar 0–5 Dugopolje
- Highest scoring: Zadar 2–5 Sesvete; Zadar 5–2 Sesvete
- Longest winning run: Cibalia, Šibenik (6)
- Longest unbeaten run: Cibalia, Šibenik (12)
- Longest winless run: Zadar (13)
- Longest losing run: Zadar (9)
- Highest attendance: 5,000 (Šibenik 0–0 Cibalia)
- Total attendance: 83,695
- Average attendance: 423
- All statistics correct as of 6 July 2016.

The 2015–16 Croatian Second Football League (also known as Druga HNL or 2. HNL) is the 25th season of the Croatian Second Football League, the second level football competition for men's association football teams in Croatia, since its establishment in 1992. The season started on 14 August 2015 and will end on 21 May 2016.

The league is contested by twelve teams and played in a triple round robin format, with each team playing every other team three times over 33 rounds. At the end of the previous season Inter Zaprešić were promoted, returning to the top flight after two seasons, while Bistra were relegated in their début season. Pomorac were also relegated due to financial insolvency. Bistra and Pomorac were replaced by Dinamo II and Šibenik, after winning their respective Croatian Third Football League divisions.

== Teams ==
On 20 April 2015, Croatian Football Federation announced that the first stage of licensing procedure for 2015–16 season was completed. For the 2015–16 Druga HNL, only nine clubs were issued a second level license: Dinamo II, Gorica, Hajduk Split II, Imotski, Istra 1961, Mosor, Rijeka II, Rudeš and Sesvete. In the second stage of licensing procedure clubs that were not licensed in the first round appealed the decision. On 20 May 2015, all remaining Druga HNL were granted second division license, along with third level clubs Šibenik and Dinamo II.

=== Stadia and locations ===
Locations of teams in 2015–16 Druga HNL

Club	City / Town	Stadium	2014-15 result	Capacity
Cibalia	Vinkovci	Stadion HNK Cibalia	6th	10,000
Dinamo II	Zagreb	Stadion Hitrec-Kacian	1st (3. HNL West)	5,000
Dugopolje	Dugopolje	Stadion Hrvatski vitezovi	7th	5,200
Gorica	Velika Gorica	Stadion Radnika	3rd	8,000
Hrvatski Dragovoljac	Zagreb	Stadion NŠC Stjepan Spajić	10th	5,000
Imotski	Imotski	Stadion Gospin dolac	5th	4,000
Lučko	Zagreb	Stadion Lučko	9th	1,500
Rudeš	Zagreb	ŠC Rudeš	4th	1,000
Segesta	Sisak	Gradski stadion Sisak	8th	8,000
Sesvete	Zagreb	Sv. Josip Radnik	2nd	1,200
Šibenik	Šibenik	Stadion Šubićevac	1st (3. HNL South)	8,000
Zadar	Zadar	Stadion Stanovi	10th (1. HNL)	6,000

=== Managerial changes ===
Team	Outgoing manager	Manner of departure	Date of vacancy	Replaced by	Date of appointment	Position in table
Zadar	(Croatia) Igor Štimac	Resigned	16 July 2015	(Croatia) Zvonimir Jurić (caretaker)	16 July 2015	Pre-season
Zadar	(Croatia) Zvonimir Jurić (caretaker)	End of caretaker tenure	7 August 2015	(Croatia) Josip Butić	7 August 2015	Pre-season
Gorica	(Croatia) Dražen Biškup	Mutual consent	4 September 2015	(Croatia) Damir Grlić (caretaker)	4 September 2015	11th
Hrvatski Dragovoljac	(Slovenia) Iztok Kapušin	Signed by Celje	7 September 2015	(Croatia) Alen Horvat	8 September 2015	8th
Cibalia	(Croatia) Damir Milinović	Mutual consent	7 September 2015	(Croatia) Miroslav Bojko	8 September 2015	4th
Gorica	(Croatia) Damir Grlić (caretaker)	End of caretaker tenure	9 September 2015	(Croatia) Damir Milinović	9 September 2015	10th
Cibalia	(Croatia) Miroslav Bojko	Resigned	5 April 2016	(Croatia) Stanko Mršić	12 April 2016	2nd
Šibenik	(Croatia) Mirko Labrović	Sacked	17 April 2016	(Croatia) Krešimir Sunara	18 April 2016	1st
Šibenik	(Croatia) Krešimir Sunara	Sacked	23 May 2016	(Croatia) Goran Tomić	23 May 2016	2nd

== League table ==
Pos	Team	Pld	W	D	L	GF	GA	GD	Pts	Qualification or relegation
1	Cibalia (C, P)	33	20	10	3	54	20	+34	70	Promotion to the Croatian First Football League
2	Šibenik	33	20	9	4	54	21	+33	69	Qualification to the promotion play-off
3	Sesvete	33	15	7	11	56	40	+16	52	
4	Gorica	33	13	8	12	40	40	0	47	
5	Rudeš	33	11	10	12	47	44	+3	43	
6	Dinamo Zagreb II	33	11	10	12	34	37	−3	43	Reserve teams are ineligible for promotion to the Croatian First Football League
7	Dugopolje	33	11	7	15	38	41	−3	40	
8	Lučko	33	11	7	15	40	47	−7	40	
9	Imotski	33	11	7	15	40	50	−10	40	
10	Hrvatski Dragovoljac	33	11	7	15	29	39	−10	40	Relegation to the Croatian Third Football League
11	Segesta (R)	33	10	8	15	44	54	−10	38	Relegation to the Croatian Third Football League
12	Zadar (R)	33	5	8	20	30	73	−43	23	Relegation to the Croatian Third Football League

Source: Druga-HNL.com
Rules for classification: 1) Points; 2) Head-to-head points; 3) Head-to-head goal difference; 4) Head-to-head away goals scored
(C) Champions; (P) Promoted; (R) Relegated

== Results ==
=== Matches 1–22 ===
Home \ Away	CIB	DIN	DUG	GOR	HRD	IMO	LUČ	RUD	SEG	SES	ŠIB	ZAD
Cibalia		1–1	2–1	2–2	5–1	1–1	1–0	0–0	3–0	1–0	1–2	2–1
Dinamo Zagreb II	1–1		1–0	1–3	4–0	2–1	2–1	0–2	3–2	2–2	2–1	0–0
Dugopolje	1–0	1–0		3–1	0–0	1–1	2–1	2–1	2–1	2–2	0–3	1–2
Gorica	0–0	1–0	0–0		1–0	3–1	1–2	1–1	1–0	2–0	0–3	1–0
Hrvatski Dragovoljac	0–0	0–0	0–1	1–0		1–0	1–2	1–1	1–0	1–0	0–1	5–0
Imotski	1–3	3–1	0–4	2–1	0–0		1–3	1–2	2–1	2–2	0–1	4–2
Lučko	0–3	0–0	3–0	3–1	0–0	0–0		0–0	1–2	3–1	0–0	1–0
Rudeš	2–2	0–3	2–0	3–0	2–0	0–2	3–1		3–3	1–1	2–3	3–0
Segesta	0–2	1–2	1–0	1–1	0–2	3–1	0–3	4–1		2–1	0–4	1–1
Sesvete	0–1	1–0	1–0	2–1	3–1	3–0	2–0	3–0	1–0		4–0	2–0
Šibenik	0–1	2–0	0–0	0–0	2–0	1–0	2–0	2–2	3–1	2–1		5–0
Zadar	0–3	1–1	0–5	1–0	0–0	0–1	3–0	0–0	1–2	2–5	1–4	

Source: Druga-HNL.com
Legend: Blue = home team win; Yellow = draw; Red = away team win.

=== Matches 23–33 ===
Home \ Away	CIB	DIN	DUG	GOR	HRD	IMO	LUČ	RUD	SEG	SES	ŠIB	ZAD
Cibalia		3–0		1–0		0–0	3–1			2–1		4–0
Dinamo Zagreb II					0–2		0–1	1–1	2–0	2–1	0–0	
Dugopolje	1–2	0–1		2–2		1–4	3–0					1–0
Gorica		2–1				3–0				2–1	0–0	3–3
Hrvatski Dragovoljac	0–2		1–0	1–2				1–0	2–3			
Imotski		2–0			2–0					0–2	1–1	2–0
Lučko				0–4	0–1	2–4			1–1			5–0
Rudeš	1–2		1–0	4–0		3–0	1–4					3–0
Segesta	2–0		3–3	2–0		3–1		2–2				
Sesvete			3–1		2–2		2–2	2–0	1–1		2–0	
Šibenik	0–0		2–0		3–1		3–0	2–1	1–0			
Zadar		1–1			1–2				2–2	5–2	1–1	

Source: Druga-HNL.com
Legend: Blue = home team win; Yellow = draw; Red = away team win.

== Top scorers ==
As of 21 May 2016; Source: Druga-HNL.com

Rank	Player	Club(s)	Goals
1	(Croatia) Frane Vitaić	Cibalia	15
2	(Croatia) Igor Prijić	Dugopolje, Segesta	14
3	(Croatia) Ivan Prskalo	Sesvete	12
4	(Nigeria) Theophilus Solomon	Šibenik	11
5	(Croatia) Ivan Antunović	Sesvete	10
5	(Croatia) Vlatko Blažević	Zadar	10
5	(Croatia) Ivan Bubalo	Dugopolje	10

== See also ==
- 2015–16 Croatian Football Cup
- 2015–16 Croatian First Football League
- 2015–16 Croatian Third Football League
