= Goran Meštrović =

Croatian footballer

Personal information
- Date of birth: 13 June 1966 (age 60)
- Place of birth: SFR Yugoslavia
- Position: Midfielder

Senior career*
Years	Team	Apps	(Gls)
1990	Toronto Croatia		
1992–1996	Cibalia	133	(19)
1996–1997	Osijek	21	(1)
1998–2002	Cibalia	67	(13)

Managerial career
- 2006: Cibalia
- 2015–2017: Vukovar '91
- * Club domestic league appearances and goals

Goran Meštrović (born June 13, 1966) is a Croatian retired footballer who played as a midfielder and also served as a football manager.

== Playing career ==
Meštrović played in the National Soccer League in 1990 with Toronto Croatia. In 1992, he played in the Croatian First Football League with HNK Cibalia. In 1996, he played with NK Osijek, and returned to Cibalia the following season. He featured in the 1999 Croatian Football Cup final against NK Osijek. On June 17, 2001, he announced his retirement from professional football.

== Managerial career ==
Meštrović served as an assistant coach under Davor Mladina for former club HNK Cibalia in 2005. He served as a head coach for Cibalia for one match in 2006. In 2015, he was named the head coach for HNK Vukovar '91 in the Croatian Third Football League. On November 17, 2017, he was named the head coach for Cibalia's football academy.
