= Brežice Gymnasium =

- Gimnazija Brežice

Location
- Trg izgnancev 14; Brežice; Slovenia
- 45.90739°N 15.5918°E

Information
- Type: general gymnasium, classical gymnasium
- Established: 1942
- Head of school: Uroš Škof
- Age range: 15 to 19
- Enrollment: 400
- Website: Brežice Gymnasium

The Brežice Gymnasium (Slovene: Gimnazija Brežice) is located in Brežice, Slovenia. It is a coeducational nondenominational state gymnasium (secondary general education school for students aged between 15 and 19). It prepares them for university, which they can enroll at after passing the matura (leaving exam).

== Short history ==
The Brežice Gymnasium was founded in 1942 as a lower secondary school with German as the language of instruction.

== Curriculum ==
The school's curriculum consists of two programs: the general program (splošna gimnazija) and the classical program (klasična gimnazija), in which one of the foreign languages is Latin. A change introduced three years ago is European classes, in which the general program incorporates the latest trends: project approach, authentic interdisciplinary learning, team teaching of foreign languages with the aim of increasing the intercultural competence of students.

The school also offers the IB Diploma Programme.

== Quality of education ==
There are very few, if any, dropouts, and the academic performance of students is very good. This is shown annually in the results of the leaving exam. Every year, the average results of students are high above the national average, and the number of students who pass with distinction is among the highest in the country.

== Notable people ==
- Iztok Kapušin - soccer player, soccer coach
- Damjan Kozole - filmmaker
- Jurij Rovan - athlete, athletic coach
- Jože Toporišič - linguist
