= Al-Tai FC =

Association football club in Saudi Arabia

Al-Tai
- Full name: Al-Tai Football Club
- Nicknames: Faris Al-Shamal (Knight of The North); Al-Hatmawi (Hatim al-Tai)
- Founded: 23 July 1961; 65 years ago
- Ground: Prince Abdulaziz bin Musaed Sports City Stadium; Hail, Saudi Arabia
- Capacity: 12,250
- Owner: Ministry of Sport
- Chairman: Omair Al-Omair
- Head coach: Dinko Jeličić
- League: First Division League
- 2025–26: FDL, 9th of 18
- Website: altai.sa
Home colours	Away colours

Al-Tai Football Club (Arabic: نادي الطائي, lit. Tayy Club) is a Saudi Arabian professional football club based in the city of Hail, in north-western Saudi Arabia, that competes in the Saudi First Division League, the second tier of the Saudi football league system.

== History ==
Al-Tai won the Saudi First Division League three times, first in the 1984–85 season and last in the 2000–01 season, and have finished runners-up once in the Saudi First Division in the 1977–78 season. Al-Tai finished third during the 2020–21 and earned promotion to the Pro League for the first time since 2008. The club have won the Prince Faisal bin Fahd Cup for Division 1 and 2 Teams once in the 1993–94 season and finished runners-up in the previous season. The club also finished as runners-up in the 1997 Crown Prince Cup. The club spent 22 non-consecutive seasons in the Pro League and won their first promotion during the 1977–78 season.

The club plays their home games at Prince Abdulaziz bin Musaed Sports City Stadium in Hail, sharing the stadium with city rivals Al-Jabalain, with whom they contest the Hail derby.

== Current squad ==
Note: Flags indicate national team as defined under FIFA eligibility rules; some limited exceptions apply. Players may hold more than one non-FIFA nationality.

No.	Pos.	Nation	Player
4	DF	KSA	Abdulkarim Al-Sultan
5	MF	BRA	Eduardo Henrique
6	DF	CRO	Mateo Leš
7	DF	KSA	Abdullah Mohammed Al-Dossari
9	FW	NGR	Simy
10	FW	VEN	Aitor López
11	FW	FRA	Nabil Alioui
12	DF	KSA	Abdullah Ibrahim Al-Dossari
14	MF	KSA	Salem Al-Saleem
15	MF	KSA	Hassan Al-Habib
16	MF	KSA	Sabr Al-Shammari
17	MF	KSA	Ali Al-Jassem
19	DF	KSA	Abdulaziz Al-Alawi
20	FW	KSA	Jaber Qarradi
21	GK	KSA	Bandar Al-Aazmi

No.	Pos.	Nation	Player
22	GK	KSA	Ammar Al-Ammar
23	DF	KSA	Nawaf Al-Qumairi
24	MF	KSA	Basil Al-Fayez
27	GK	KSA	Mohammed Al-Dhulayfi
29	MF	KSA	Saleh Al-Shammari
44	DF	KSA	Mohammed Al-Mutair
46	MF	KSA	Saud Al-Meqbel
47	MF	KSA	Hamad Al-Shammari
55	DF	KSA	Muhannad Al-Harthi
66	DF	KSA	Hussein Fraij
84	DF	KSA	Jabr Al-Jabr
87	DF	KSA	Musab Al-Farhan
88	FW	KSA	Abdullah Al-Shaye
—	GK	KSA	Saleh Al-Ohaymid

=== Out on loan ===
Note: Flags indicate national team as defined under FIFA eligibility rules; some limited exceptions apply. Players may hold more than one non-FIFA nationality.

No.	Pos.	Nation	Player
33	FW	KSA	Amer Khalil (at Al-Gottah)

== Coaching staff ==
Position	Name
Head coach	(Croatia) Dinko Jeličić
Assistant coach	(Croatia) Tomislav Nezic (Saudi Arabia) Salman Al-Farsi
Goalkeeping coach	(Bahrain) Abdullah Bilal
Fitness coach	(Saudi Arabia) Hatem Al-Othman
Analyst	(Saudi Arabia) Hassan Al-Mughrabi
Doctor	(Saudi Arabia) Mohamed Al-Quhrani
Physiotherapist	(Saudi Arabia) Salem Al-Nakhli
Technical director	(Saudi Arabia) Isa Al-Ghamdi

== Managerial history ==
- (Brazil) Valdeir Vieira (15 June 1999 – 20 October 1999)
- (Brazil) Oliveira (21 October 1999 – 15 December 1999)
- (El Salvador) Rubén Vásquez (15 December 1999 – 31 December 1999)
- (Romania) Ion Dumitru (1 January 2000 – 1 May 2000)
- (Brazil) Lula (1 July 2000 – 27 December 2000)
- (Brazil) Pedro (27 December 2000 – 1 May 2001)
- (Brazil) Dário Lourenço (1 July 2001 – 4 December 2001)
- (Saudi Arabia) Khalil Al-Masri (5 December 2001 – 6 January 2002)
- (Brazil) Palhinha (7 January 2002 – 1 May 2002)
- (Romania) Alexandru Moldovan (4 July 2002 – 19 January 2003)
- (Saudi Arabia) Khalil Al-Masri (19 January 2003 – 30 May 2003)
- (Germany) Uli Maslo (1 July 2003 – 16 September 2003)
- (Tunisia) Ahmad Al-Ajlani (17 September 2003 – 20 March 2004)
- (Tunisia) Mohammad Karim Zouaghi (21 March 2004 – 31 May 2004)
- (Tunisia) Ammar Souayah (6 June 2004 – 6 January 2005)
- (Saudi Arabia) Khalil Al-Masri (8 January 2005 – 6 May 2005)
- (Tunisia) Khaled Ben Yahia (11 May 2005 – 30 May 2005)
- (Tunisia) Ammar Souayah (7 July 2005 – 1 May 2006)
- (Brazil) Jorvan Vieira (4 June 2006 – 23 November 2006)
- (Brazil) Fernando Suárez (24 November 2006 – 3 December 2006)
- (Saudi Arabia) Khalid Al-Koroni (4 December 2006 – 1 February 2007)
- (Brazil) João Carlos (1 February 2007 – 1 May 2007)
- (Brazil) Fernando Suárez (1 May 2007 – 15 May 2007)
- (France) Bernard Simondi (22 June 2007 – 8 November 2007)
- (Brazil) Fernando Suárez (18 November 2007 – 1 May 2008)
- (Netherlands) Tahseen Jabbary (15 August 2008 – 8 October 2008)
- (Algeria) Abdellah Mecheri (11 October 2008 – 20 December 2008)
- (Tunisia) Mohamed Aldo (24 December 2008 – 28 February 2010)
- (Saudi Arabia) Khalil Al-Masri (28 February 2010 – 1 May 2010)
- (Brazil) Ralf Borges Ferreira (4 June 2010 – 3 November 2010)
- (Tunisia) Hedi Ben Mokhtar (28 November 2010 – 28 April 2012)
- (Romania) Isac Doru (26 June 2012 – 19 May 2013)
- (Brazil) Paulinho McLaren (25 June 2013 – 17 December 2013)
- (Egypt) Bashir Abdel Samad (18 December 2013 – 29 June 2014)
- (Saudi Arabia) Khalil Al-Masri (2 July 2014 – 1 May 2015)
- (Tunisia) Djamel Belhadi (1 July 2015 – 30 August 2015)
- (Brazil) Carlos Roberto (5 September 2015 – 23 February 2016)
- (Tunisia) Habib Ben Romdhane (23 February 2016 – 31 May 2016)
- (Uruguay) Juan Rodríguez (31 May 2016 – 20 November 2016)
- (Egypt) Amro Anwar (26 November 2016 – 10 January 2017)
- (Tunisia) Makram Abdullah (10 January 2017 – 26 December 2017)
- (Romania) Liviu Ciobotariu (27 December 2017 – 26 September 2018)
- (Tunisia) Djamel Belkacem (29 September 2018 – 31 May 2019)
- (Romania) Claudiu Niculescu (15 June 2019 – 29 October 2019)
- (Serbia) Dejan Arsov (30 October 2019 – 5 February 2020)
- (Saudi Arabia) Khalil Al-Masri (5 February 2020 – 7 September 2020)
- (Spain) Víctor Afonso (7 September 2020 – 20 September 2020)
- (Croatia) Dragan Talajić (26 September 2020 – 10 November 2020)
- (Tunisia) Mohamed Kouki (11 November 2020 – 28 August 2021)
- (Serbia) Zoran Manojlović (30 August 2021 – 4 November 2021)
- (Chile) José Luis Sierra (7 November 2021 – 30 June 2022)
- (Portugal) Pepa (19 July 2022 – 22 January 2023)
- (Romania) Mirel Rădoi (22 January 2023 – 18 May 2023)
- (Portugal) José Pedro Barreto (caretaker) (18 May 2023 – 31 May 2023)
- (Croatia) Krešimir Režić (1 June 2023 – 25 September 2023)
- (Portugal) José Pedro Barreto (caretaker) (25 September 2023 – 27 September 2023)
- (Romania) Laurențiu Reghecampf (27 September 2023 – 4 April 2024)
- (Romania) Cristinel Țermure (caretaker) (4 April 2024 – 15 April 2024)
- (Uruguay) Leonardo Ramos (15 April 2024 – 1 June 2024)
- (Serbia) Aleksandar Ilić (12 July 2024 – 12 October 2024)
- (Tunisia) Mohamed Kouki (15 October 2024 – 16 April 2025)
- (Croatia) Zdravko Logarušić (16 April 2025 – 1 June 2025)
- (Spain) Carlos Inarejos (14 July 2025 – 6 October 2025)
- (Saudi Arabia) Khalil Al-Masri (8 October 2025 – 8 January 2026)
- (Morocco) Amine Zoubir (caretaker) (8 January 2026 – )

== Honours ==
- Saudi First Division League
  - Winners (3): 1984–85, 1994–95, 2000–01
  - Runners-up (1): 1977–78
  - Third place (1): 2020–21
- Saudi Second Division League
  - Winners (1): 1976–77
- Crown Prince Cup
  - Runners-up (1): 1997
- Prince Faisal bin Fahd Cup for Division 1 and 2 Teams
  - Winners (1): 1993–94
  - Runners-up (1): 1994–95

== See also ==
- List of football clubs in Saudi Arabia
