= Siniša Sesar =

Croatian football manager

Personal information
- Date of birth: 14 October 1972 (age 54)
- Place of birth: Vinkovci, SFR Yugoslavia
- Height: 1.90 m (6 ft 3 in)
- Position: Defender

Senior career*
Years	Team	Apps	(Gls)
1995-1997	Cibalia	28	(2)
1999-2000	Vukovar '91	31	(2)
2000-2001	Dinamo Zagreb	6	(1)
2001-2002	Marsonia	27	(0)
2004-2006	Međimurje	54	(3)
Total		146	(8)

Managerial career
- 2012: Cibalia (youth)
- 2012–2014: Cibalia (assistant)
- 2014–2015: Cibalia
- 2015: Cibalia (youth)
- 2015–2016: Cibalia (assistant)
- Apr 2016: → Cibalia (caretaker)
- Nov 2016–2017: Cibalia
- * Club domestic league appearances and goals

Siniša Sesar (born 14 October 1972) is a Croatian footballer and later football manager.

Sesar succeeded Zoran Tomić as manager of hometown club Cibalia in October 2014. He later worked at the club as an interim and became assistant to Austrian manager Peter Pacult in 2017.
