= Isac Doru =

Romanian football manager

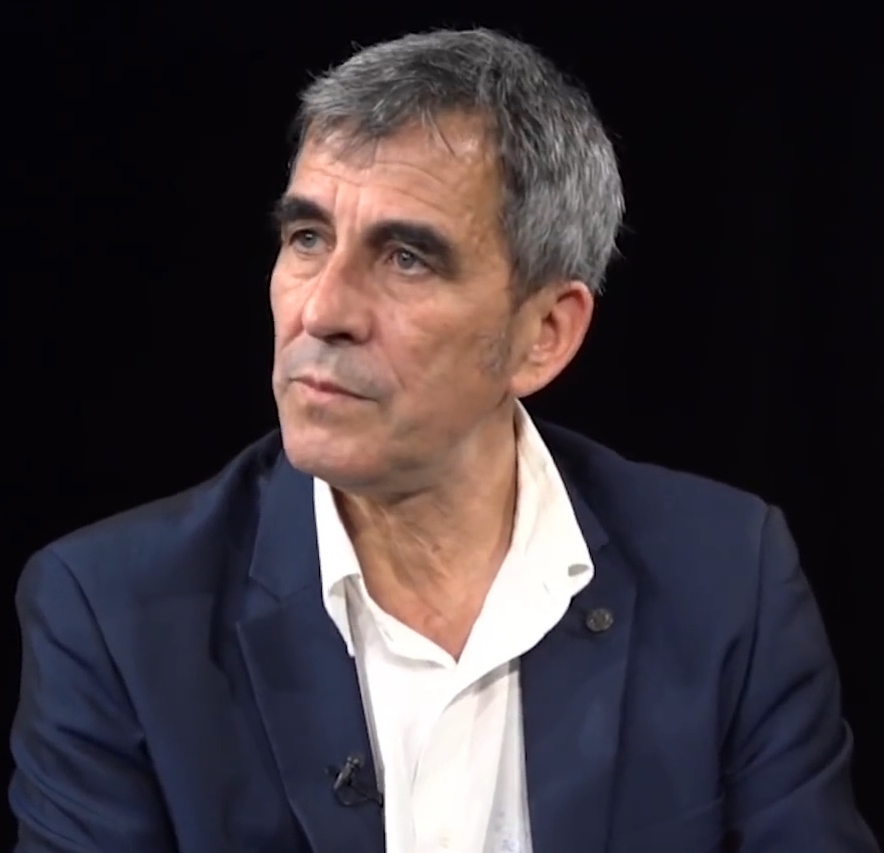
Doru in 2020

Isac Doru (born 14 July 1962 in Craiova) is a Romanian football manager.

== Managerial career ==
Isac Doru, a FIFA Diploma degree holder has gained experience from heavy names in international football. During the period spent at Nagoya Grampus Eight, he was the assistant of Arsène Wenger. Before he left Japan, Doru worked with Carlos Queiros, former Real Madrid, and Manchester United and Bora Milutinović.

Period	Team	Country	Position	Ref.
1990–1991	AS Nancy Academy	France	Manager	
1991–1992	US Lillebonne	France	Manager	
1992–1995	Makki International Academy	Japan	Youth manager	
1995–1997	Rissho University	Japan	Under-18 manager	
1997–2002	Nagoya Grampus Eight	Japan	Technical director	
2002	Clementi Khalsa	Singapore	Manager	
2003	Rapid Bucharest	Romania	Assistant manager	
2003–2004	Al-Hilal	Saudi Arabia	Under-17 manager	
2004–2007	Al-Sadd	Qatar	Under-17, Assistant and manager	
2008–2009	Umm-Salal	Qatar	Assistant manager	
2010–2012	Qatar Olympic	Qatar	Assistant manager	
2012–2013	Al-Tai	Saudi Arabia	Manager	
2013–2014	OGC Nice Academy	France	Youth manager	
2014	Romania U-19 national team	Romania	Manager	
2014–2016	Houston Dynamo U-23	United States	Manager	
2016–2018	Yokohama F. Marinos	Japan	Sport director	
2019–2021	India national team	India	Technical Director	
