= Belinho =

Croatian footballer

Personal information
- Full name: Rafael Gomes Cirino
- Date of birth: 13 January 2009 (age 17)
- Place of birth: Rio de Janeiro, Brazil
- Position: Midfielder

Team information
- Current team: Kustošija Zagreb
- Number: 10

Youth career
- Vasco da Gama
- –2022: Vinodol
- 2022–2026: Dinamo Zagreb

Senior career*
Years	Team	Apps	(Gls)
2026–	Kustošija Zagreb	15	(1)
- * Club domestic league appearances and goals as of 19:09, 5 October 2026 (UTC)

Rafael Gomes Cirino (born 13 January 2009 in Brazil), better known as Belinho is a footballer who plays as a midfielder for Kustošija Zagreb.

== Early life ==
Belinho was born in Brazil and acquired Croatian citizenship after approval of the Croatian Olympic Committee on the request of the Croatian Football Federation.

== Club career ==
Belinho played in the youth ranks for Vasco da Gama in Rio de Janeiro before his father moved to Novi Vinodolski, Croatia and he started playing for local club NK Vinodol, after which he moved to the Croatian capital of Zagreb and joined GNK Dinamo Zagreb Academy. He has drawn comparisons to Eduardo da Silva, also a naturalized Croatian citizen from Brazil who played for Dinamo Zagreb and Croatia national football team.
