= Sergej Jakirović =

Association football manager (born 1976)

- Jakirović with Hull City in 2026

Personal information
- Date of birth: 23 December 1976 (age 49)
- Place of birth: Mostar, SR Bosnia and Herzegovina, SFR Yugoslavia
- Height: 1.92 m (6 ft 4 in)
- Position: Centre-back

Team information
- Current team: Hull City (manager)

Youth career
- Neretva
- Maestral Krvavac

Senior career*
Years	Team	Apps	(Gls)
1995–1996	Neretva	24	(3)
1996–1998	RNK Split		
1998–1999	Spartak Trnava	20	(2)
1999–2000	Istra	10	(0)
2000–2002	Korotan Prevalje	50	(8)
2002–2004	Kamen Ingrad	47	(5)
2004–2005	Zagreb	30	(6)
2005–2007	CSKA Sofia	32	(3)
2007	Superfund	2	(0)
2007–2008	Rijeka	21	(0)
2008–2009	Austria Kärnten	0	(0)
2008	Austria Kärnten II	10	(0)
2009	→ Spittal/Drau (loan)	7	(0)
2009	Austria Kärnten II	11	(0)
2010	Lučko	11	(0)
2010–2011	Sesvete	31	(5)
2011	Sloga Gredelj Zagreb	2	(0)
2011–2013	Dugo Selo	49	(16)
2013–2014	Sesvete	32	(2)
2014	Dugo Selo	6	(1)
2015–2016	Matija Gubec	11	(1)
2017	Oroslavje	6	(2)
2017	Matija Gubec	6	(1)

International career
2005–2006	Bosnia and Herzegovina	5	(0)

Managerial career
- 2017–2018: Sesvete
- 2018–2020: Gorica
- 2020: Maribor
- 2020–2022: Zrinjski Mostar
- 2022–2023: Rijeka
- 2023–2024: Dinamo Zagreb
- 2025: Kayserispor
- 2025–: Hull City
- * Club domestic league appearances and goals

Sergej Jakirović (pronounced [sěrɡej jakǐːroʋitɕ]; 23 December 1976) is a Bosnian professional football manager and former player. He is the current head coach of Premier League club Hull City. He represented Bosnia and Herzegovina internationally during his playing career.

== Early life ==
Born in Mostar, SR Bosnia and Herzegovina, SFR Yugoslavia (modern-day Bosnia and Herzegovina) to parents Enver Jakirović and Jelena (née Talajić). His family, at the time, lived in Metković, SR Croatia, where he grew up, finished elementary and secondary school, and also began his football career. His father, Enver, a long-time goalkeeper and coach of NK Neretva Metković, influenced Sergej from his earliest youth to become a footballer. Consequently, Sergej also began as a goalkeeper for NK Neretva but soon showed that his skills lay elsewhere, shifting to a central midfield role. He progressed through all of NK Neretva's youth selections and made a five-minute senior debut against NK Osijek on May 24, 1995, while the club was competing in the top-tier 1. HNL.

== Club career ==
Jakirović played in the Croatian First League for Neretva, Istra, Kamen Ingrad, Zagreb and Rijeka. He also had a couple of spells in European leagues, playing for Bulgarian side CSKA Sofia and SK Austria Kärnten in the Austrian league.

== International career ==
In August 2005, in preparation for the upcoming four 2006 FIFA World Cup qualification matches, Bosnia and Herzegovina national football team manager Blaž Slišković named Jakirović to the squad. Jakirović made his debut for the Bosnia and Herzegovina national football team in an August 2005 friendly match away against Estonia. He was called up by Slišković a total of six times, four of which were in World Cup qualification Group 7, including two friendlies. Ultimately, he earned a total of five caps, including a two features in friendlies, his first against Estonia and on February 2006 against Japan, which was his final international match—in World Cup qualifications, between 3 September and 12 October 2005, he entered the game from the bench on two occasions, in wins against Belgium and Lithuania, was unused substitute against San Marino, and in last round he was a starter in a defeat against Serbia and Montenegro in Belgrade.

== Managerial career ==
=== Early career ===
Between 2017 and 2018, Jakirović managed Sesvete in the Croatian Second League.

On 20 June 2018, Jakirović was appointed manager of Croatian First League club Gorica, which he led to fifth place in the 2018–19 season. On 24 February 2020, following a 6–0 loss to Hajduk Split, he was sacked by the club.

On 23 April 2020, Jakirović was named new manager of Slovenian PrvaLiga club Maribor, replacing Darko Milanič. He was sacked on 29 August 2020 after getting eliminated by Northern Irish team Coleraine in the 2020–21 UEFA Europa League first qualifying round.

=== Zrinjski Mostar ===
On 28 December 2020, Jakirović became the new manager of Bosnian Premier League club Zrinjski Mostar, signing a three-and-a-half-year contract with the club.

In his first game in charge, Zrinjski beat Krupa in a league match on 27 February 2021. He oversaw his first loss as Zrinjski manager in a Bosnian Cup game against Sarajevo, played on 10 March 2021.

On 20 January 2022, Jakirović signed a two-and-a-half-year contract extension until 2024. After beating Radnik Bijeljina on 19 March 2022, Zrinjski broke the all-time Bosnian Premier League record with 13 consecutive victories, overpassing the previous record of 12 victories set by Željezničar in the 2011–12 season. On 16 April 2022, he managed Zrinjski to a 4–0 win against Sarajevo, clinching the club's record seventh league title seven rounds before the end of the season. Subsequently, he was named the Bosnian Premier League Manager of the Season.

After getting eliminated from the 2022–23 UEFA Champions League first qualifying round by Moldovan club Sheriff Tiraspol, Jakirović led Zrinjski to the 2022–23 UEFA Europa Conference League play-off round, where they got eliminated by Slovak club Slovan Bratislava following a penalty shoot-out, missing out on a chance to play in the group stage.

On 29 November 2022, the board of Zrinjski confirmed that Jakirović had left the club, as he was set to sign a contract with Croatian top division side Rijeka.

=== Rijeka ===
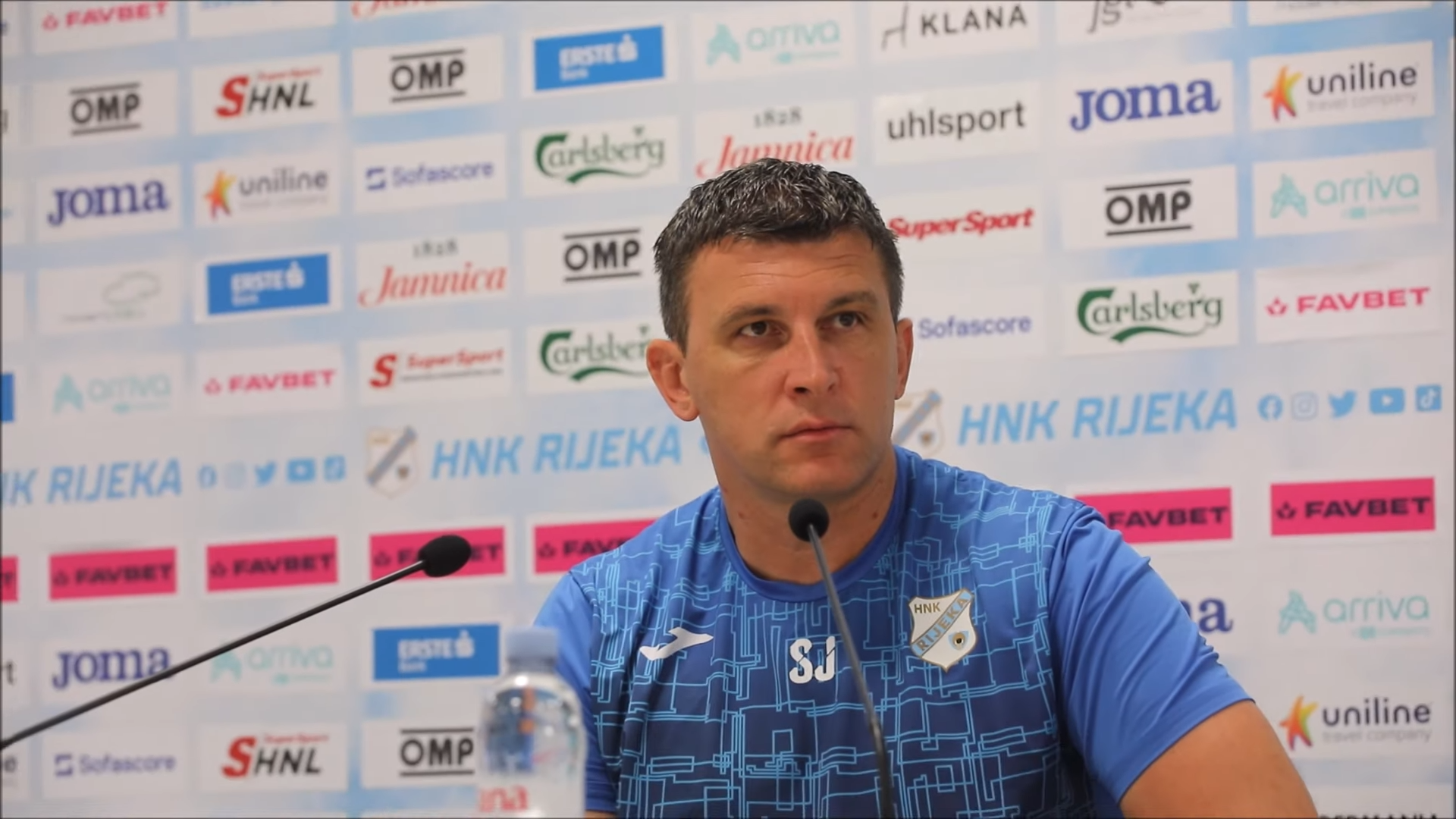
Jakirović with Rijeka in 2023

One day after his Zrinjski departure was confirmed, Jakirović signed a two-and-a-half-year contract with Rijeka with an option for another year. He made his debut on 21 January 2023, when Rijeka drew 1–1 away against Osijek.

On 28 January, Jakirović won his first match as Rijeka manager after a 2–1 win over Šibenik. After a four-game winning streak, he suffered his first defeat as the club's manager on 25 February 2023 in a 1–0 loss to Slaven Belupo. With Rijeka, Jakirović finished the season in fourth place, qualifying for the 2023–24 UEFA Europa Conference League second qualifying round. The club eliminated Kosovan side Dukagjini and Faroese side B36 Tórshavn, before being drawn against Lille in the play-off round.

=== Dinamo Zagreb ===
==== 2023–24 season ====
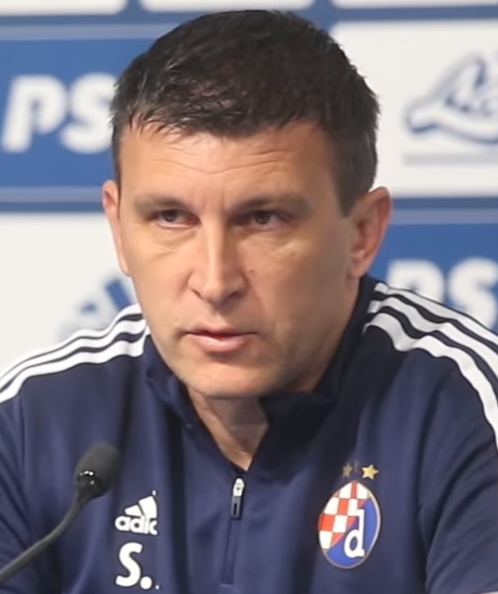
Jakirović with Dinamo Zagreb in 2024

On 21 August 2023, three days before their match against Lille, Jakirović left Rijeka and was appointed manager of Dinamo Zagreb, replacing Igor Bišćan.

Jakirović managed his first Dinamo Zagreb match against Sparta Prague in the UEFA Europa League play-off round, winning 3–1 at home on 24 August. However, following a 4–1 defeat to Sparta in the second leg on 31 August, Dinamo was eliminated from the Europa League and continued playing in the Conference League group stage. Following a second place finish in group C, Dinamo eliminated Real Betis 2–1 on aggregate in the knockout round play-offs, qualifying to the round of 16. After winning 2–0 at home against PAOK in the first leg, the side suffered a 5–1 defeat in the second leg, getting eliminated from the Conference League.

On the domestic level, Jakirović led Dinamo to a league and cup double, defeating his former club Rijeka 3–1 on aggregate in the Croatian Cup final.

==== 2024–25 season ====
Jakirović's side started the 2024–25 season by beating Istra 1961 in the first round of the league season on 2 August 2024. Dinamo managed to qualify for the 2024–25 UEFA Champions League league phase after eliminating Qarabağ 5–0 on aggregate. In the first league phase match, however, the team suffered a 9–2 defeat against Bayern Munich; it was the club's heaviest ever defeat, and the first time that one side had conceded nine goals in the history of the competition. Two days after the match, on 19 September, he was sacked by the club.

=== Kayserispor ===
On 28 January 2025, Jakirović was appointed manager of Süper Lig club Kayserispor. Despite guiding the team to safety from relegation, he left the club by mutual consent on 8 June 2025, following the 2024–25 season's conclusion.

=== Hull City ===
On 11 June 2025, Jakirović was appointed as the head coach of Hull City on a two-year contract, with the club holding an option for a further year. It was announced that his exit from Kayserispor was down to Hull agreeing "a settlement" with the club, which allowed him to sign for the EFL Championship side. Jakirović was joined in England by long-time assistant Marko Salatović, as well as the rest of his personal coaching team consisting of Marin Ivančić and Anđelo Roguljić.

On 9 August 2025, Jakirović debuted as Hull City manager for their league match against Coventry City which ended in a goalless draw. In April 2026, he was nominated for the EFL Championship manager of the year award. He qualified the club for the Championship play-offs and eliminated Millwall in the semi-finals, securing the Tigers a place in the final and a chance to return to the top tier of English football for the first time since 2017. On 23 May 2026, Jakirović's side won the play-off final and returned to the Premier League after beating Middlesbrough 1–0 thanks to a 95th minute goal by Oli McBurnie.

On 22 August 2026, Hull opened their Premier League season with a shock 2–0 win over Manchester United at the MKM Stadium. As a result, Jakirović became the first ever Bosnian to both manage and win a Premier League match. A few weeks later, on 4 September, he signed a two-year contract extension with the club. On 11 September, Jakirović was awarded the Barclays Manager of the Month award for August 2026, having won his first two games against Manchester United and Coventry City, not conceding a single goal in the process.

== Personal life ==
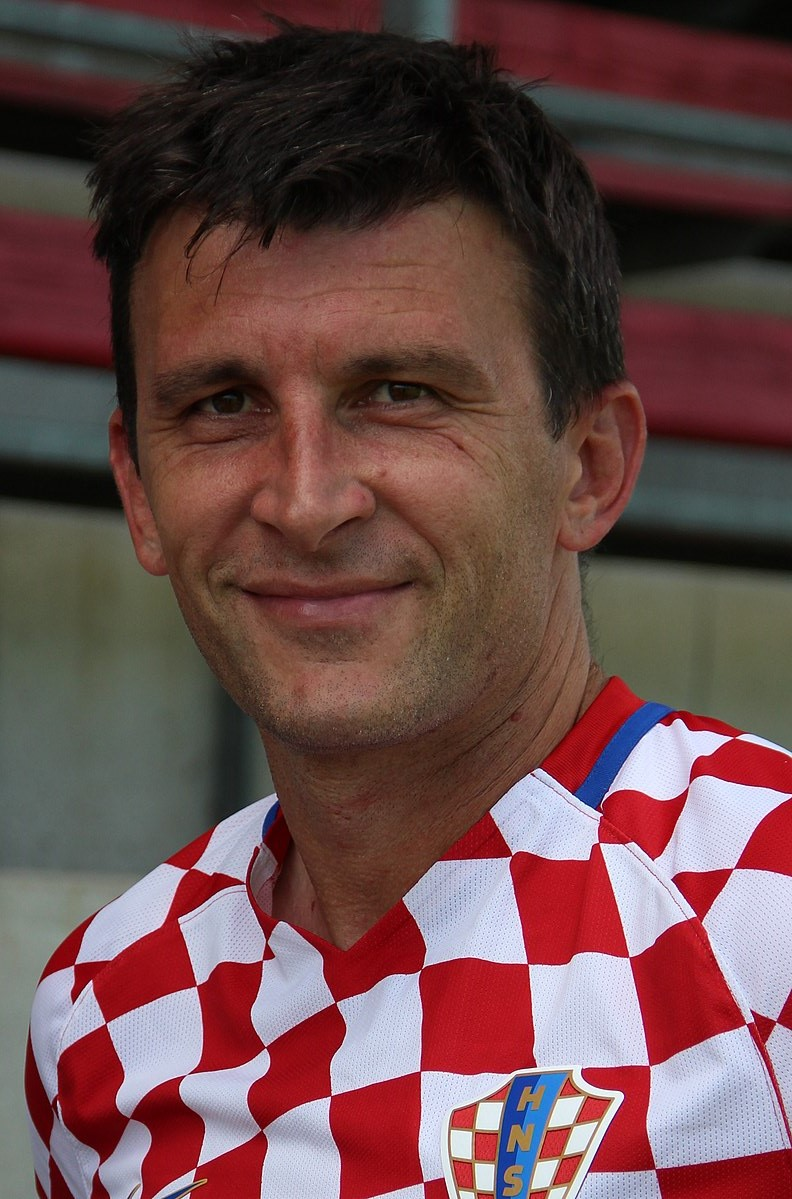
Jakirović appeared for the Croatian veteran football team in 2018

Jakirović was born in Mostar, in modern-day Bosnia and Herzegovina, and grew up in Metković, modern-day Croatia, so he has both Bosnian and Croatian citizenship. His father, Enver "Ekra" Jakirović, was a goalkeeper who started playing football professionally for FK Velež in his native Mostar, where the Jakirović's household is located and family from his father side still reside in the Old Town. However, Sergej's father already at the age of 18 moved to NK Neretva Metković, where he settled and married. Sergej is married to Marina, a medical nurse, and they have two sons, Leon and Matija. Both of his sons play football at youth level, his eldest Leon as a defender at Inter Milan, and the younger Matija as a goalkeeper at GNK Dinamo Zagreb.

Before leaving Croatia, Jakirović was very active and highly successful in Croatian veterans' football. He made a total of 29 appearances and scored 23 goals at various humanitarian and anniversary matches involving the Croatian national football and futsal teams. He is a multiple-time Croatian champion in club veterans football and futsal, and was twice named the best player of the Croatian Indoor Veterans Football Championship, first with the veterans of Sesvete in 2015, and the second time with the veterans of Neretva in 2018.

== Career statistics ==
=== International ===
Appearances and goals by national team and year
National team	Year	Apps	Goals
Bosnia and Herzegovina	2005	4	0
Bosnia and Herzegovina	2006	1	0
Total		5	0

== Managerial statistics ==
As of match played 22 November 2026

Managerial record by team and tenure
Team	From	To	Record					Ref.
Team	From	To	P	W	D	L	Win %	Ref.
Sesvete	5 June 2017	18 June 2018	36	18	6	12	50.0	
Gorica	20 June 2018	24 February 2020	63	28	15	20	44.4	
Maribor	23 April 2020	29 August 2020	13	9	1	3	69.2	
Zrinjski Mostar	28 December 2020	29 November 2022	77	52	15	10	67.5	
Rijeka	30 November 2022	21 August 2023	27	17	4	6	63.0	
Dinamo Zagreb	21 August 2023	19 September 2024	60	41	9	10	68.3	
Kayserispor	28 January 2025	8 June 2025	17	8	5	4	47.1	
Hull City	11 June 2025	Present	65	26	19	20	40.0	
Total			358	199	74	85	55.6	

== Honours ==
=== Player ===
Spartak Trnava

- Slovak Cup: 1997–98

CSKA Sofia

- Bulgarian Cup: 2005–06
- Bulgarian Supercup: 2006

=== Manager ===
Zrinjski Mostar

- Bosnian Premier League: 2021–22

Dinamo Zagreb

- Croatian Football League: 2023–24
- Croatian Cup: 2023–24

Hull City

- EFL Championship play-offs: 2026

Individual

- Bosnian Premier League Manager of the Season: 2021–22
- Croatian Football League Manager of the Season: 2023–24
- Croatian Football League Manager of the Month: August 2024
- Premier League Manager of the Month: August 2026
- Award of the City of Metković: 2026
