= Stjepan Vranješ =

Croatian footballer

Personal information
- Date of birth: 28 August 1971 (age 55)
- Place of birth: SFR Yugoslavia
- Position: Right back

Senior career*
Years	Team	Apps	(Gls)
1990–1999	Osijek	172	(4)
1999–2002	Maccabi Netanya	77	(1)
- * Club domestic league appearances and goals

Stjepan Vranješ (born 28 August 1971) is a retired Croatian footballer. His former clubs include NK Osijek and Maccabi Netanya.

== Career ==
Vranješ played football for Croatian side NK Osijek before moving abroad to play for Israeli side Maccabi Netanya at the end of his career. He is Osijek's only player to lift a trophy, after captaining then in the 1999 Croatian Football Cup Final.
