= NK Kustošija =

Croatian football club

- Full name: Nogometni Klub Kustošija
- Founded: 1929; 97 years ago
- Ground: Kustošija
- Capacity: 2,550
- Chairman: Branimir Majdak
- Manager: (Croatia) Rajko Vidović
- League: Prva NL
- 2025–26: Druga NL, 2nd (promoted)
- Website: nk-kustosija.hr
Home colours	Away colours

NK Kustošija is a Croatian professional football club based in Zagreb, which currently competes in the Prva NL, the second level of Croatian football league system. Kustošija's home ground is the Kustošija Stadium in Zagreb, which has a capacity of 2,550 spectators. It was founded in 1929.

Kustošija also have a football school attached to the club, where a number of children of famous Croatians have trained due to its location in the center of Zagreb.

== History ==
The club was founded on 15 July 1929 in Zagreb, at Ilica 55, under the name Sportski klub Metalac. It had 18 members and consisted of football, swimming and chess sections. The initiative to establish the club came from members of the Metal Workers’ Union, Ivan Slugić and Ivan Korošec, who became the club’s first president. The club was a workers’ club for metal industry employees. It was not permitted to operate publicly until its statutes were officially approved in June 1930. The club statutes from 1930 list it under the name Športski klub Metalac. The football section of Metalac played its first official match on 14 September 1930 at the Tipografija ground against Esperant (1–2). Metalac initially did not have its own ground and played its home matches at the Grafičar ground, a workers’ club which allowed Metalac to use the pitch free of charge. The club premises were located at Haulikova Street 10/IV, which from 1933 also served as the headquarters of the “Association of Third-Class Clubs”.

In 1932, the club colours were red and black. During the interwar period, Metalac was associated with the activities of the illegal Communist Party.

The club was dissolved on 15 May 1941 during the period of the Independent State of Croatia, along with other workers’ clubs.

During World War II, almost all members of Metalac’s various sections participated in the Yugoslav Partisan movement. A total of 41 members were killed, seven of whom were proclaimed People’s Heroes of Yugoslavia: Petar Biškup Veno, Marijan Čavić, Dragica Končar, Rade Končar, Ivica Lovinčić, Marko Orešković and Joža Vlahović. Milutin Baltić and Ivan Šibl were also proclaimed People’s Heroes.

Metalac was re-established on 9 June 1945, with its first general assembly held ten days later. From that point it operated under the name Fizkulturno društvo Metalac. Josip Broz Tito became a member and honorary president of the club on 2 October 1945. In 1947, Metalac was granted use of the Šparta ground. After its post-war re-establishment, the club finished 6th in the 1946 Croatian League, earning promotion to the second tier. In the 1952–53 season, Bogdan Cuvaj became head coach, and in 1954–55 the club achieved its best league result, finishing third in the Yugoslav Second League. Metalac reached the quarter-finals of the Yugoslav Cup in 1948 and 1951. From 7 August 1953, the club operated under the name Sportsko društvo Metalac. The club competed in the second and third tiers until the 1972–73 season, after which it played exclusively in lower-division competitions.

Previous crest used until 2025.

In 1964, the club merged with NK Kustošija (formerly Sloboda) and acquired the football ground in Sokolska Street. Until then, it had played at the Munjarski put ground. On 18 March 1969, the club changed its name to Radničko sportsko društvo Metalac.

Since 1993, the club has been known as NK Kustošija.

In the 2015–16 season, Kustošija won the MŽNL Središte and was promoted to the 3. HNL – West. In 2016–17, after finishing second, the club earned promotion to the 2. HNL.

Kustošija was relegated from the First NL in the 2022–23 season (the second tier since the 2022–23 season). In February 2023, 18-year-old Senegalese player Mikayil Faye joined the club. After making 14 appearances, he was sold in the summer to Barcelona for €5 million plus bonuses, a record fee for a player from the Croatian second tier.

In September 2025, the team presented a rebranding, adopting a new badge. In December they presented gold and black as main colors.

== Honours ==
Croatian football league system

- Druga NL (tier 3)
  - Second place (2): 2016–17; 2023–24
- MŽNL - Center (tier 4)
  - Winners (1): 2015–16
- 1. ŽNL Zagreb (tier 5)
  - Winners (1): 2006–07

Yugoslav football league system

- Croatian Republic Football League
  - Winners (1): 1946–47
- Podsavezna liga Zagreb
  - Winners (1): 1952
- Nogometno prvenstvo Jugoslavije – Hrvatsko-slovenska
  - Winners (1): 1953–54
- Zagrebačka zona
  - Winners (3): 1959–60; 1965–66; 1967–68

== Current squad ==
As of 21 November 2026

Note: Flags indicate national team as defined under FIFA eligibility rules; some limited exceptions apply. Players may hold more than one non-FIFA nationality.

No.	Pos.	Nation	Player
1	GK	CRO	Luka Pršlja
2	FW	ALG	Hillal Soudani
3	DF	CRO	Filip Markanović (on loan from Lokomotiva Zagreb)
4	DF	KOS	Leon Zeqiraj
5	DF	CRO	Tin Kulenović
6	MF	CRO	Lovro Dukić (co-operation loan with Gorica)
7	FW	CRO	David Žabec
8	MF	CRO	Luka Jurak
9	FW	KOS	Medin Gashi (co-operation loan with Gorica)
10	MF	CRO	Belinho
11	FW	CRO	Jan Doležal
12	GK	CRO	Antonio Rajić (on loan from Dinamo Zagreb)
13	FW	CRO	Marin Vučković

No.	Pos.	Nation	Player
14	FW	ANG	Filipe Quissequel (co-operation loan with Varaždin)
15	DF	CRO	Josip Bartulović
16	MF	ESP	Razmik Mayilyan Petrosyan
17	MF	URU	Mauro Zalazar
18	MF	CRO	Tomislav Krizmanić
19	FW	NGR	Prosper Obiora Nwachukwu
20	MF	CRO	Đivo Pregelj
23	DF	CRO	Domagoj Begonja (co-operation loan with Varaždin)
24	MF	SEN	Malick Diop
25	DF	CRO	Sven Sopić
51	DF	ENG	Josh Nichols
55	DF	CRO	Ivan Graf (captain)
88	MF	BIH	Nikola Šunjić

=== Out on loan ===
Note: Flags indicate national team as defined under FIFA eligibility rules; some limited exceptions apply. Players may hold more than one non-FIFA nationality.

No. / Pos. / Nation / Player; — / FW / CRO / Lovro Klanac (at Samobor until 30 June 2027)	No. / Pos. / Nation / Player; — / FW / CRO / Ivan Spajić (at Inker Zaprešić until 30 June 2027)

== Recent seasons ==
Season	League									Cup	European competitions	Top league scorer	
Season	Division	P	W	D	L	F	A	Pts	Pos	Cup	European competitions	Player	Goals
2012–13	2. ŽNL Zagreb	24	20	2	2	126	22	62	1st ↑				
2013–14	1. ŽNL Zagreb	30	22	5	3	78	21	71	2nd				
2014–15	MŽNL - Center	30	16	5	9	68	38	53	3rd				
2015–16	MŽNL - Center	30	23	3	4	77	24	72	1st ↑				
2016–17	3. HNL	30	16	6	8	59	35	54	2nd ↑	Preliminary			
2017–18	2. HNL	33	11	7	15	34	39	40	8th	DNQ		Kristijan Lovrić	11
2018–19	2. HNL	26	7	7	12	20	28	28	11th	DNQ		Matija Čakarun	6
2019–20	2. HNL	19	6	5	8	19	27	23	13th	DNQ			
2020–21	2. HNL	34	12	15	7	43	38	51	5th	DNQ		Fran Brodić	14
2021–22	2. HNL	30	11	9	10	39	35	42	5th	DNQ		Jan Jurčec	8
2022–23	1. NL	33	9	14	10	35	50	34	11th ↓	DNQ		Andrej Šaronja	8
2023–24	2. NL	30	18	7	5	61	25	61	2nd	DNQ		Fran Petković	11
2024–25	2. NL	30	13	9	8	51	40	48	8th	R2		Marko Guja	16
2025–26	2. NL	30	17	8	5	55	23	59	1st ↑	DNQ		Noel Djurkovic	10
2026–27	1. NL									TBA			

== Historical list of coaches ==
- (Socialist Federal Republic of Yugoslavia) Ivica Gajer
- (Socialist Federal Republic of Yugoslavia) Antun Pogačnik
- (Socialist Federal Republic of Yugoslavia) Ivan Belošević
- (Socialist Federal Republic of Yugoslavia) Bogdan Cuvaj
- (Socialist Federal Republic of Yugoslavia) August Bivec
- (Socialist Federal Republic of Yugoslavia) Gustav Lechner
- (Croatia) Renato Jurčec (Sep 26, 2015 – Aug 9, 2017)
- (Croatia) Denis Bezer (Aug 9, 2017 – Dec 6, 2017)
- (Croatia) Nino Bule (Jan 4, 2018 – Apr 17, 2018)
- (Croatia) Denis Bezer (April 19, 2018 – Dec 31, 2018)
- (Croatia) Ante Ivanda (Jan 30, 2019 – Sep 20, 2019)
- (Croatia) Ivica Landeka (Sep 20, 2019 – Mar 30, 2021)
- (Croatia) Dinko Jeličić (Mar 30, 2021 – Jun 30, 2021)
- (Croatia) Igor Tolić (Jul 1, 2021 – Oct 17, 2021)
- (Croatia) Roy Ferenčina (Oct 18, 2021 – May 30, 2022)
- (Croatia) Dinko Jeličić (C) (Jul 1, 2022 – Jul 25, 2022)
- (Croatia) Ilija Lončarević (Aug 4, 2022 – Oct 6, 2022)
- (Croatia) Petra Mandić (Oct 21, 2022 – Mar 10, 2023)
- (Croatia) Samir Toplak (Mar 11, 2023 – Jun 30, 2023)
- (Croatia) Damir Milinović (Jun 1, 2023 – Oct 9, 2023)
- (Croatia) Rajko Vidović (Oct 9, 2023 – Mar 16, 2024)
- (Bosnia and Herzegovina) Luka Bilobrk (Mar 26, 2024 –Jun 30, 2024)
- (Croatia) Kresimir Gojun (Jul 1, 2024 – Dec 24, 2024)
- (Croatia) Roy Ferenčina (Dec 12, 2024 – Jun 30, 2025)
- (Bosnia and Herzegovina) Ivan Božić (Jul 14, 2025 –)
