= Tonko Vukušić =

Croatian footballer

Personal information
- Date of birth: 24 May 1934
- Place of birth: Split, Kingdom of Yugoslavia
- Date of death: 17 January 2011 (aged 76)
- Place of death: Vinkovci, Croatia
- Position: Midfielder

Senior career*
Years	Team	Apps	(Gls)
1950–1961	Dinamo Vinkovci		
1961–1962	Lokomotiva Vinkovci		

Managerial career
- 1963: Lokomotiva Vinkovci
- 1982–1985: Dinamo Vinkovci
- 1986–1987: Vojvodina
- 1989: Toronto Croatia
- 1989–1990: Osijek
- 1990–1991: Dinamo Vinkovci
- 1995–1997: Mladost 127
- 1997–1998: Cibalia
- 1998–1999: Mladost 127
- 1999–2000: Kamen Ingrad
- * Club domestic league appearances and goals

Tonko Vukušić (24 May 1934 – 17 January 2011) was a Croatian professional footballer and coach.

== Career ==
Vukušić played in the Croatian Republic Football League in 1950 with Dinamo Vinkovci. He played with Dinamo until the 1961 season, where he later signed with Lokomotiva Vinkovci and retired in 1963 due to injuries.

== Managerial career ==
Vukušić transitioned into a head coach in 1963 to manage Lokomotiva Vinkovci. In 1982, he returned to his former club Dinamo Vinkovci as head coach in the Yugoslav Second League, and secured promotion to the Yugoslav First League by winning the West Division title. He remained with Vinkovci until the 1985 season and managed FK Vojvodina in 1986, where he secured promotion for the club to the top tier by winning the league. In 1989, he served as the head coach for Toronto Croatia in the National Soccer League. In late 1989, he was named the head coach for NK Osijek in the Yugoslav First League.

In 1991, he returned to manage Dinamo Vinkovci in the Yugoslav Second League. In 1995, he managed in the Croatian First Football League with NK Mladost 127 for two seasons, and returned in the 1998-99 season. In 1997, he returned to his former team, Dinamo Vinkovci later changed to HNK Cibalia in the Croatian Second Football League. In 1999, he managed in the Croatian Third Football League with NK Kamen Ingrad and secured the league title and promotion to the Croatian Second League. He later became the president of the association of coaches for the Croatian First Football League.

== Personal life ==
He died on January 17, 2011.
