= Mile Petković =

Croatian professional football manager (born 1953)

Personal information
- Date of birth: 12 August 1953 (age 73)
- Place of birth: Lovas, FPR Yugoslavia

Managerial career
- Years: Team
- 1992: Cibalia
- 1996–1997: Cibalia
- 1999–2000: Hrvatski Dragovoljac
- 2001–2003: Cibalia
- 2004–2005: NK Zagreb
- 2006–2007: Cibalia
- 2008–2009: Slaven Belupo
- 2010–2011: Slaven Belupo
- 2014: Šibenik

Mile Petković (born 12 August 1953) is a Croatian professional football manager. Petković managed a number of Croatian teams throughout the 1990s and 2000s, most notably first level sides Cibalia, NK Zagreb and Slaven Belupo.
