= HNK Cibalia =

Association football club in Croatia

Cibalia
- Full name: Hrvatski nogometni klub Cibalia Vinkovci
- Nickname: Nebesko plavi (The Sky-blues)
- Founded: 7 May 1919; 107 years ago (as HGŽK Cibalia)
- Ground: Stadion HNK Cibalia
- Capacity: 8,200
- Chairman: Damir Mustapić
- Manager: Tomislav Čuljak
- League: First League (II)
- 2025–26: 2nd
- Website: www.hnk-cibalia.hr
| Home colours | Away colours |

Hrvatski nogometni klub Cibalia, commonly known as Cibalia Vinkovci or simply Cibalia, is a Croatian football club from the town of Vinkovci in eastern Croatia. Cibalia currently play in the Prva NL, Croatia's second-tier league. Their stadium is located in the south part of their home town and can hold 10,000 spectators. The name Cibalia comes from the Roman settlement called Colonia Aurelia Cibalae which was the precursor of the present-day town of Vinkovci. In the period from 1945 to 1990 the club was called NK Dinamo Vinkovci.

== History ==
The club was founded in 1919 as HGŽK Cibalia Vinkovci, and in 1925 the team merged with local rivals RŠK Sloga. In the 1930s the club was coached by Bane Sekulić, Károly Nemes and Rajmond Breznik. After World War II the club was banned by the new Communist regime. After the war re-established clubs Sloga and OFD Graničar merged and formed NK Dinamo Vinkovci which began competing within the Yugoslav football system. The club would see several humble decades before finally making it to the Yugoslav First League in 1982. They played in the top-tier league for five seasons until they were relegated to the Yugoslav Second League in 1987.

In 1990 the team returned its traditional name of Cibalia. The club spent much of the 1990s in the Prva HNL, Croatian top level. It remained in the Prva HNL until the 2003–04 season when it was relegated to the Druga HNL. The club was also penalized by UEFA in the same season with a deduction of six points for failure to fulfill financial obligations related to past player transfers. Nevertheless, in the 2004–05 season, Cibalia outdid all of its opponents in the second league by a large margin, won the promotion playoffs and returned to Prva HNL. It was in this season that they also had Croatian mixed martial arts legend Mirko Filipović play the final 8 minutes of a match vs HNK Vukovar.

Cibalia also had some success playing in the Croatian Cup, where it reached the final in 1999 (lost to Osijek) and semi-final in 2000, 2004, 2009, 2011, 2012 and 2013.

The 2009–10 season was Cibalia's best ever season in the top division of Croatian football. They finished third after giants Dinamo Zagreb and Hajduk Split, having spent most of the season in second position. They qualified for the second qualifying round of the UEFA Europa League but eventually lost to Northern Irish side Cliftonville and exited the tournament.

Cibalia were relegated from the 1. HNL in 2018 and also faced bankruptcy. They ended up being relegated directly to the third division, where they finished the season in first place and were promoted after receiving a second division license in May 2019.

== Honours ==
- Yugoslav Second League (West):
  - Winners (1): 1981–82
- Yugoslav Third League (SR Croatia):
  - Winners (1): 1974–75
- Yugoslav Cup
  - Quarter-finals (1): 1977
- Croatian First League:
  - Third place (1): 2009–10
- Croatian Second League:
  - Winners (3): 1997–98, 2004–05, 2015–16
- Croatian Third League (East):
  - Winners (1): 2018–19
- Croatian Cup:
  - Runners-up (1): 1999
- UEFA Intertoto Cup:
  - Semi-finals (1): 2003

== Supporters and rivalries ==
The club has a relatively large but local following. Their main supporter group are called Ultrasi. Their main rivals are the group Kohorta Osijek from NK Osijek.

== Current squad ==
As of 10 March 2026

Note: Flags indicate national team as defined under FIFA eligibility rules; some limited exceptions apply. Players may hold more than one non-FIFA nationality.

| No. | Pos. | Nation | Player |
|---|---|---|---|
| 1 | GK | CRO | Luka Marijanović |
| 2 | MF | CRO | Maro Medo |
| 3 | DF | CRO | Filip Mekić |
| 4 | DF | CRO | Renato Kelić |
| 5 | DF | CRO | Petar Rubić |
| 6 | DF | BRA | Britto |
| 7 | FW | CRO | Gabrijel Boban |
| 8 | MF | CRO | Marin Kuzminski |
| 9 | MF | CRO | Andrija Bubnjar |
| 10 | FW | CRO | Petar Mišić |
| 11 | FW | CRO | David Žabec |
| 12 | GK | BIH | Marko Galić |
| 13 | MF | CRO | Luka Rajković |

| No. | Pos. | Nation | Player |
|---|---|---|---|
| 14 | MF | CRO | Petar Brlek |
| 15 | DF | BIH | Karlo Stapić |
| 16 | MF | CRO | Ivo Vukić |
| 17 | MF | CRO | Matej Marojević |
| 18 | FW | CRO | Luka Bartolović |
| 20 | DF | CRO | Marin Grujević |
| 21 | MF | CRO | Marko Pervan |
| 22 | MF | CRO | Luka Mestrović |
| 23 | GK | CRO | Karlo Vrljić |
| 24 | MF | CRO | David Bosak |
| 25 | DF | CRO | Sven Sopić |
| 28 | MF | CRO | David Bosnjak |
| 29 | DF | CRO | Noa Godec |

== Recent seasons ==
| Season | League | | | | | | | | | Cup | Europe / Other | | Top league scorer(s) | |
| Season | Division | P | W | D | L | F | A | Pts | Pos | Cup | Europe / Other | | Name | Goals |
|---|---|---|---|---|---|---|---|---|---|---|---|---|---|---|
| 1992 | 1. HNL | 22 | 3 | 9 | 10 | 13 | 24 | 15 | 9th | DNQ | | | Josip Markovinović | 3 |
| 1992–93 | 1. HNL | 30 | 11 | 9 | 10 | 31 | 30 | 31 | 5th | R2 | | | Davor Čop | 8 |
| 1993–94 | 1. HNL | 34 | 11 | 13 | 10 | 37 | 27 | 35 | 7th | R2 | | | Josip Markovinović | 8 |
| 1994–95 | 1. HNL | 30 | 9 | 10 | 11 | 26 | 33 | 37 | 10th | QF | | | Josip Markovinović | 5 |
| 1995–96 | 1. HNL | 36 | 11 | 12 | 13 | 43 | 55 | 45 | 9th | R2 | | | Goran Meštrović | 6 |
| 1996–97 | 1. HNL | 30 | 11 | 0 | 19 | 35 | 56 | 33 | 13th ↓ | R1 | | | Antun Andričević, Ivica Marinčić | 5 |
| 1997–98 | 2. HNL | 30 | 22 | 5 | 3 | 80 | 19 | 71 | 1st ↑ | R1 | | | | |
| 1998–99 | 1. HNL | 32 | 10 | 7 | 15 | 34 | 44 | 26 | 9th | RU | | | Ivan Bošnjak | 7 |
| 1999–2000 | 1. HNL | 33 | 11 | 12 | 10 | 42 | 39 | 45 | 6th | SF | | | Ivan Bošnjak | 14 |
| 2000–01 | 1. HNL | 32 | 5 | 18 | 9 | 31 | 45 | 33 | 9th | R2 | Intertoto Cup | R2 | Mario Meštrović | 7 |
| 2001–02 | 1. HNL | 30 | 9 | 9 | 12 | 34 | 37 | 36 | 10th | R1 | | | Mladen Bartolović | 6 |
| 2002–03 | 1. HNL | 32 | 12 | 7 | 13 | 39 | 44 | 43 | 5th | QF | | | Mladen Bartolović | 9 |
| 2003–04 | 1. HNL | 32 | 8 | 7 | 17 | 39 | 53 | 31 | 11th ↓ | SF | Intertoto Cup | SF | Zoran Ratković | 10 |
| 2004–05 | 2. HNL | 32 | 21 | 8 | 3 | 65 | 23 | 65 | 1st ↑ | R1 | | | Danijel Kuzmanović | 14 |
| 2005–06 | 1. HNL | 32 | 9 | 10 | 13 | 33 | 47 | 37 | 9th | R2 | | | Mladen Križanović; Aleksandar Stojanovski; Ivan Žgela | 4 |
| 2006–07 | 1. HNL | 33 | 9 | 5 | 19 | 33 | 53 | 32 | 10th | QF | | | Zoran Zekić | 12 |
| 2007–08 | 1. HNL | 33 | 11 | 7 | 15 | 40 | 48 | 40 | 8th | QF | | | Željko Malčić | 12 |
| 2008–09 | 1. HNL | 33 | 10 | 8 | 15 | 33 | 53 | 38 | 8th | SF | | | Željko Malčić | 9 |
| 2009–10 | 1. HNL | 30 | 16 | 9 | 5 | 46 | 20 | 57 | 3rd | R1 | | | Dino Kresinger | 9 |
| 2010–11 | 1. HNL | 30 | 12 | 8 | 10 | 33 | 24 | 44 | 4th | SF | Europa League | QR2 | Dino Kresinger | 11 |
| 2011–12 | 1. HNL | 30 | 13 | 6 | 11 | 35 | 35 | 45 | 5th | SF | | | Mladen Bartolović | 8 |
| 2012–13 | 1. HNL | 33 | 9 | 5 | 19 | 29 | 44 | 32 | 11th ↓ | SF | | | Tomislav Mazalović | 7 |
| 2013–14 | 2. HNL | 33 | 18 | 5 | 10 | 41 | 39 | 59 | 2nd | R2 | | | Hrvoje Tokić | 16 |
| 2014–15 | 2. HNL | 30 | 10 | 8 | 12 | 36 | 44 | 38 | 6th | R2 | | | Jakov Puljić | 16 |
| 2015–16 | 2. HNL | 33 | 20 | 10 | 3 | 54 | 20 | 70 | 1st ↑ | R2 | | | Frane Vitaić | 15 |
| 2016–17 | 1. HNL | 36 | 4 | 9 | 23 | 26 | 79 | 21 | 9th | R2 | | | Frane Vitaić | 7 |
| 2017–18 | 1. HNL | 36 | 6 | 8 | 22 | 36 | 75 | 26 | 10th ↓↓ | R2 | | | Ivan Galić | 7 |
| 2018–19 | 3. HNL | 30 | 21 | 5 | 4 | 67 | 24 | 68 | 1st ↑ | R1 | | | Dominik Dogan | 16 |
| 2019–20 | 2. HNL | 19 | 2 | 7 | 10 | 13 | 34 | 13 | 16th | R1 | | | Mate Bajić | 5 |
| 2020–21 | 2. HNL | 34 | 15 | 6 | 13 | 50 | 43 | 51 | 4th | R1 | | | Gerald Diyoke, Filip Jazvić | 7 |
| 2021–22 | 2. HNL | 30 | 11 | 8 | 11 | 44 | 42 | 41 | 6th | R1 | | | Domagoj Pušić, Filip Jazvić | 8 |
| 2022–23 | 1. NL | 33 | 13 | 15 | 5 | 37 | 26 | 54 | 3rd | R1 | | | Ivan Mihaljević | 7 |
| 2023–24 | 1. NL | 33 | 11 | 4 | 18 | 37 | 57 | 37 | 8th | R2 | | | Karlo Miljanić | 10 |
| 2024–25 | 1. NL | 33 | 12 | 10 | 11 | 47 | 39 | 46 | 5th | DNP | | | Josip Pejić | 9 |
| 2025–26 | 1. NL | 33 | 17 | 7 | 9 | 51 | 33 | 58 | 2nd | R2 | | | Gabrijel Boban | 13 |

== European record ==
=== Summary ===
| Competition | Pld | W | D | L | GF | GA | Last season played |
|---|---|---|---|---|---|---|---|
| UEFA Europa League | 2 | 0 | 1 | 1 | 0 | 1 | 2010–11 |
| UEFA Intertoto Cup | 10 | 3 | 3 | 4 | 13 | 16 | 2003 |
| Total | 12 | 3 | 4 | 5 | 13 | 17 | |

Source:, Last updated on 10 September 2010
Pld = Matches played; W = Matches won; D = Matches drawn; L = Matches lost; GF = Goals for; GA = Goals against. Defunct competitions indicated in italics.

=== By season ===
| Season | Competition | Round | Opponent | Home | Away | Agg. |
|---|---|---|---|---|---|---|
| 2000–01 | Intertoto Cup | R1 | (Federal Republic of Yugoslavia) FK Obilić | 3–1 | 1–1 | 4–2 |
| 2000–01 | Intertoto Cup | R2 | (Hungary) FC Tatabánya | 0–0 | 2–3 | 2–3 |
| 2003–04 | Intertoto Cup | R2 | (Belarus) FC Shakhtyor | 4–2 | 1–1 | 5–3 |
| 2003–04 | Intertoto Cup | R3 | (Finland) Tampere United | 0–1 | 2–0 | 2–1 |
| 2003–04 | Intertoto Cup | SF | (Germany) VfL Wolfsburg | 1–4 | 0–4 | 1–8 |
| 2010–11 | Europa League | QR2 | (Northern Ireland) Cliftonville | 0–0 | 0–1 | 0–1 |

=== Player records ===
- Most appearances in UEFA club competitions: 10 appearances
  - Jure Jurić
- Top scorers in UEFA club competitions: 3 goals
  - Ivan Maroslavac

== All-time total in the Prva HNL ==
| | Points | Games | Wins | Draws | Losses | GF | GA |
|---|---|---|---|---|---|---|---|
| HNK Cibalia | 515 | 438 | 129 | 128 | 181 | 470 | 587 |

== Historical list of coaches ==
- (Kingdom of Yugoslavia) Bane Sekulić
- (Hungary) Károly Nemes
- (Hungary) Rajmond Breznik
- (Socialist Federal Republic of Yugoslavia) Dražan Jerković (1975–76)
- (Socialist Federal Republic of Yugoslavia) Otto Barić (1976–79)
- (Socialist Federal Republic of Yugoslavia) Ivan Marković
- (Socialist Federal Republic of Yugoslavia) Tonko Vukušić (19xx–1984)
- (Socialist Federal Republic of Yugoslavia) Nedeljko Gugolj (1984–8X)
- (Socialist Federal Republic of Yugoslavia) Martin Novoselac (1986–88)
- (Socialist Federal Republic of Yugoslavia) Ivo Šušak (1988–89)
- (Socialist Federal Republic of Yugoslavia) Stipe Kedžo (1989–90)
- (Croatia) Tonko Vukušić (1990-9x)
- (Croatia) Mile Petković (1992)
- (Croatia) Stanko Mršić (1993–95)
- (Croatia) Davor Čop (interim) (1994)
- (Croatia) Tomislav Radić (1995–96)
- (Croatia) Davor Čop (interim) (1995)
- (Croatia) Mile Petković (1996–97)
- (Croatia) Tomislav Radić (1997)
- (Croatia) Tonko Vukušić (1997–98)
- (Croatia) Krasnodar Rora (1998)
- (Croatia) Mijo Ručević (1998–99)
- (Croatia) Srećko Lušić (1999–2000)
- (Croatia) Davor Čop (2000–01)
- (Croatia) Mile Petković (2001–03)
- (Croatia) Bruno Buhač (interim) (2003)
- (Croatia) Srećko Lušić (2003)
- (Croatia) Vjeran Simunić (2003–04)
- (Croatia) Davor Mladina (2004–05)
- (Croatia) Branko Karačić (2005–06)
- (Croatia) Igor Štimac (2006)
- (Croatia) Ivica Matković (2006)
- (Croatia) Mile Petković (2006–07)
- (Croatia) Srećko Lušić (2007–08)
- (Croatia) Stanko Mršić (2008–11)
- (Croatia) Siniša Jalić (interim) (2011)
- (Croatia) Samir Toplak (2011–12)
- (Croatia) Miroslav Bojko (interim) (2012)
- (Croatia) Željko Kopić (2012)
- (Croatia) Miroslav Bojko (2012–13)
- (Croatia) Damir Petravić (2013–14)
- (Croatia) Stanko Mršić (2014)
- (Croatia) Zoran Tomić (2014)
- (Croatia) Siniša Sesar (2014–15)
- (Croatia) Bruno Buhač (interim) (2015)
- (Croatia) Damir Milinović (2015)
- (Croatia) Miroslav Bojko (2015–16)
- (Croatia) Siniša Sesar (interim) (2016)
- (Croatia) Stanko Mršić (2016)
- (Croatia) Siniša Sesar (interim) (2016–17)
- (Austria) Peter Pacult (2017)
- (Bosnia and Herzegovina) Mladen Bartolović (2017–19 Mar 18)
- (Croatia) Davor Rupnik (2018)
- (Croatia) Petar Tomić (2018–19)
- (Croatia) Davor Mladina (29 June 2019 -20)
- (Croatia) Petar Tomić (2020 –20 Sep 21)
- (Croatia) Darko Jozinović (21 Sep 2021 -19 Apr 22)
- (Croatia) Ivan Karaula (19 Apr 2022 - Jun 22)
- (Croatia) Tomislav Radotić (Jun 2022 –21 Jun 23)
- (Croatia) Ivan Karaula (Sep 2023 – present)

== Sources ==
1. Nogomet 85, Slaven Zambata
2. Nogomet 86, Slaven Zambata
3. Nogometno YU prvenstvo 85
4. Nogometni godišnjak Hrvatska 92
5. Arena – "Hrvatska na Europskom prvenstvu" 1996.
6. YU fudbal 87–88 VIII/88
7. Nogomet – Croatian football news; number 17, May 1999, p58
