= Krešimir Sunara =

Croatian football manager

Personal information
- Date of birth: 10 March 1970 (age 56)
- Place of birth: Šibenik, SFR Yugoslavia
- Position: Midfielder

Team information
- Current team: Hrvatski Dragovoljac (manager)

Senior career*
Years	Team	Apps	(Gls)
1990	Zadar		
1993–1994	Dubrava	15	(1)
1994–1995	Šibenik	15	(1)
1995–1996	Osijek	12	(1)
- GOŠK Dubrovnik
- Segesta

Managerial career
- 2004-2005: Trnje
- 2005-2006: Dugo Selo
- Croatia Sesvete
- 2009–2011: Naftaš
- 2011–2013: Hrvatski Dragovoljac
- 2014: Solin
- 2014: Maksimir
- 2015–2016: Dugopolje
- 2016: Šibenik
- 2016: Vrapče
- 2016–2017: Hrvatski Dragovoljac
- 2018: Dubrava
- 2018: Zadar
- 2019: Hrvatski Dragovoljac
- 2019–2020: Dubrava
- 2021: Primorac Biograd
- 2022-: Hrvatski Dragovoljac
- * Club domestic league appearances and goals

Krešimir Sunara (born 10 March 1970) is a Croatian retired footballer and later football manager. As of September 2022, he is manager of Hrvatski Dragovoljac.

== Managerial career ==
Sunara was appointed manager at Dugopolje in July 2015, replacing Mario Ćutuk, and in summer 2016, Sunara took charge at Vrapče after a stint at Šibenik whom he had joined in April 2016.

After he left Dubrava Tim Kabel in summer 2018, Sunara joined Zadar. He then had another spell at Dubrava but was dismissed in September 2020.

He was sacked by Primorac Biograd in October 2021, after replacing interim coach Leo Šarić in March 2021.
