= Damir Biškup =

Croatian football manager

Personal information
- Date of birth: 3 December 1969 (age 56)
- Height: 1.90 m (6 ft 3 in)
- Position: Defender

Senior career*
Years	Team	Apps	(Gls)
- NK Zagreb
- Dinamo Zagreb
1992-1994	NK Zagreb	31	(4)
1996-1997	Orijent	18	(1)
1997-1999	Zadarkomerc	37	(3)
2000–2001	Chemnitzer FC	5	(0)

Managerial career
- 2010: Hrvatski Dragovoljac
- 2011: Hrvatski Dragovoljac
- * Club domestic league appearances and goals

Damir Biškup (born 3 December 1969) is a Croatian retired football defender and later manager. (Note: Damir Biškup at WorldFootball.net)
