= Ivan Pudar =

Croatian footballer

Personal information
- Date of birth: 16 August 1961 (age 65)
- Place of birth: Zemun, PR Serbia, FPR Yugoslavia
- Height: 1.92 m (6 ft 4 in)
- Position: Goalkeeper

Senior career*
Years	Team	Apps	(Gls)
1979–1986	Hajduk Split	108	(0)
1986–1987	Spartak Subotica	5	(0)
1987–1990	Hajduk Split	49	(0)
1990–1991	Espinho	28	(0)
1991–1992	Boavista	21	(0)
Total		206	(0)

International career
1985	Yugoslavia	1	(0)

Managerial career
- 2004–2007: Šibenik
- 2007: Hajduk Split
- 2008–2009: Trogir
- 2009: Solin
- 2010: Hrvatski Dragovoljac
- 2012–2013: Solin
- 2015: Segesta
- 2017: Zadar
- 2017–2018: RNK Split
- 2018: Caspiy
Medal record
Men's football
Representing Yugoslavia
Olympic Games
Bronze medal – third place	1984 Los Angeles	Team
- * Club domestic league appearances and goals

Ivan Pudar (born 16 August 1961) is a Croatian professional football manager and former player who was most recently the manager of Caspiy.

== Playing career ==
During his club career he played for Hajduk Split, Spartak Subotica and Boavista. He earned one cap for the Yugoslavia national team against China in 1985 and was a reserve keeper in the squad that Miljan Miljanić took to the 1982 World Cup.

== Managerial career ==
Following his retirement from playing professional football, he became manager, including a stint at Hajduk Split in 2007. In July 2008 he took charge of the Croatian Second Division side NK Trogir. In April 2015 he was named manager of Segesta. In September 2018, Pudar took charge at Kazakhstan second tier side Caspiy.

== Personal life ==
Pudar's house in Gornji Tugari was burned down in July 2017.
