= NK Hrvatski Dragovoljac =

Croatian football club

Hrvatski dragovoljac
- Full name: Nogometni klub Hrvatski dragovoljac
- Nickname: Crni (The Blacks)
- Founded: 1975; 45 years ago (as NK Trnsko '75)
- Ground: Stadion NŠC Stjepan Spajić
- Capacity: 5,000; 5,350
- Chairman: Marinko Perić
- Manager: Krešimir Sunara
- League: First League (II)
- Website: nk-hrvatskidragovoljac.hr
Home colours	Away colours

Nogometni klub Hrvatski dragovoljac (English: Football Club Hrvatski dragovoljac), commonly referred to as NK Hrvatski dragovoljac or simply Hrvatski dragovoljac, is a Croatian football club based in the Novi Zagreb neighbourhood of the country's capital city of Zagreb. The team's fans are known as the "Black Warriors" (Croatian: Crni ratnici). The club's home ground is Stadion NŠC Stjepan Spajić, which has a capacity of 5,000.

== History ==
The club was founded in 1975 as NK Trnsko 75, with its name being changed to ONK Novi Zagreb in 1976 and NK Novi Zagreb in 1990.

When the Croatian War of Independence began in 1991, many of the club's members volunteered to fight. In honour of those who fought and those who lost their lives in the war, the club was renamed Hrvatski Dragovoljac (Croatian Volunteer) when they resumed play in 1994. They also adopted a new logo incorporating black as the team's colour.

In 1995, the club won promotion to the former Croatian First B-League, where they finished first and qualified for the championship play-off of the Prva HNL in 1996, finishing fifth in the end. In 1997, the club reached the third place in the Prva HNL and qualified for the UEFA Intertoto Cup, a success they repeated in the following two seasons with fourth and fifth-place finishes.

=== Name changes ===
- NK Trnsko '75 (1975–1976)
- ONK Novi Zagreb (1976–1990)
- NK Novi Zagreb (1990–1994)
- NK Hrvatski Dragovoljac (1994–present)

== Honours ==
- Croatian Second League
  - Champions (2): 1994–95 (West), 2012–13

== Recent seasons ==
Season	League									Cup	Other competitions		Top goalscorer	
Season	Division	P	W	D	L	F	A	Pts	Pos	Cup	Other competitions		Player	Goals
1992–93	RNL NSZR								1st ↑					
1993–94	3. HNL Centre	30	15	9	6	56	28	39	4th ↑					
1994–95	2. HNL West	36	30	5	1	83	12	95	1st ↑					
1995–96	1. HNL	28	14	5	9	38	34	47	5th	R1			Predrag Jurić	13
1996–97	1. A HNL	30	13	10	7	51	37	49	3rd	SF			Dragan Vukoja	19
1997–98	1. HNL	32	14	8	10	38	30	50	4th		UEFA Intertoto Cup	GS	Mario Bazina	12
1998–99	1. HNL	32	8	8	16	27	42	32	5th	R2	UEFA Intertoto Cup	R1	Mario Bazina	7
1999–2000	1. HNL	33	8	9	16	36	58	33	10th	R2	UEFA Intertoto Cup	R1	Vlatko Đolonga	10
2000–01	1. HNL	32	8	9	15	35	57	33	11th	QF			Marin Lalić	7
2001–02	1. HNL	30	9	7	14	34	45	34	13th ↓	R2			Marin Lalić	13
2002–03	2. HNL South	32	10	4	18	44	63	34	6th	R1				
2003–04	2. HNL South	32	11	9	12	36	35	42	8th	R1				
2004–05	2. HNL South	32	17	8	7	62	39	59	2nd	R1			**Srđan Lakić**	24
2005–06	2. HNL South	32	13	9	10	48	39	48	8th	R2			Edo Flego	9
2006–07	2. HNL	30	18	4	8	60	25	58	4th	R2			Ivan Lišnić	13
2007–08	2. HNL	30	19	7	4	60	28	64	2nd				Mladen Križanović	11
2008–09	2. HNL	30	13	10	7	38	36	49	6th	R2			Niko Tokić, Danijel Zlatar	5
2009–10	2. HNL	26	11	9	6	33	21	42	3rd ↑	PR			Ivan Begović	6
2010–11	1. HNL	30	5	8	17	24	55	33	16th ↓	R1			Velimir Švarić	4
2011–12	2. HNL	28	10	10	8	36	37	40	8th	R1			Ivan Božić, Velimir Švarić	9
2012–13	2. HNL	30	16	5	9	39	25	53	1st ↑				Josip Marošević	9
2013–14	1. HNL	36	7	9	20	41	61	30	10th ↓				Stipe Bačelić-Grgić	10
2014–15	2. HNL	30	8	9	13	30	42	33	10th				Vice Kendeš	5
2015–16	2. HNL	33	11	7	15	29	39	40	10th				Vice Kendeš, Niko Tokić	6
2016–17	2. HNL	33	9	9	15	30	39	36	10th				Valentino Majstorović	5
2017–18	2. HNL	33	8	10	15	37	48	34	11th				Valentino Majstorović	11
2018–19	2. HNL	26	7	6	13	23	29	27	12th				Valentino Majstorović	7
2019–20	2. HNL	19	7	5	7	21	26	26	9th				Vinko Petković	7
2020–21	2. HNL	34	16	11	7	49	39	59	1st ↑				Valentino Majstorović	7
2021–22	1. HNL	36	4	7	25	31	75	19	10th ↓				Valentino Majstorović	6
2022–23	1.NL	33	4	10	19	32	59	22	12th ↓				Toni Vinogradac	7

=== Key ===
1st	2nd	↑	↓
Champions	Runners-up	Promoted	Relegated

Top scorer shown in bold when he was also top scorer for the division.

- P = Played
- W = Games won
- D = Games drawn
- L = Games lost
- F = Goals for
- A = Goals against
- Pts = Points
- Pos = Final position
- 1. HNL = Prva HNL
- 2. HNL = Druga HNL
- 3. HNL = Treća HNL
- GS = Group Stage
- PR = Preliminary round
- R1 = Round 1
- R2 = Round 2
- QF = Quarter-finals
- SF = Semi-finals
- RU = Runners-up
- W = Winners

== Players ==
=== Current squad ===
As of 23 April 2023

Note: Flags indicate national team as defined under FIFA eligibility rules; some limited exceptions apply. Players may hold more than one non-FIFA nationality.

No.	Pos.	Nation	Player
1	GK	CRO	Mario Marić (captain)
2	DF	CRO	Bartul Markovina
3	DF	SRB	Adnan Islamović
4	MF	CRO	Luka Išlić (on loan from Lokomotiva Zagreb)
5	DF	CRO	Fran Kobetić
6	MF	SRB	Vanja Marković
9	FW	CRO	Toni Vinogradac
12	GK	CRO	Jan Paolo Debijađi
13	FW	GHA	Seth Amoateng
15	DF	CRO	Kristijan Čabrajić (on loan from Lokomotiva Zagreb)
16	DF	CHN	Luo Hanbowen
17	FW	CRO	Ivan Lendrić
18	DF	CRO	Uwem Alexander (on loan from Osijek)

No.	Pos.	Nation	Player
19	DF	CRO	Josip Filipović
20	DF	CRO	Ivan Žutić
21	MF	BRA	Marcello Pistelli
22	DF	CRO	Dominik Braun (on loan from Dinamo Zagreb)
23	MF	CRO	Filip Pobi
24	FW	CRO	Bruno Zdunić (on loan from Lokomotiva Zagreb)
26	MF	CRO	Mihovil Šutalo
27	DF	BIH	Ivan Marić
28	FW	CRO	Mario Veljača (on loan from Lokomotiva Zagreb)
29	MF	CRO	Branimir Ćavar
30	MF	CRO	Ive Bilić
35	MF	CRO	Antonio Perić
97	GK	CRO	Antonio Tuta

=== Out on loan ===
Note: Flags indicate national team as defined under FIFA eligibility rules; some limited exceptions apply. Players may hold more than one non-FIFA nationality.

No.	Pos.	Nation	Player
—	DF	CRO	Stipe Vulikić (at Perugia until 30 June 2023)

== European record ==
=== Summary ===
Competition	Pld	W	D	L	GF	GA	Last season played
UEFA Intertoto Cup	8	4	0	4	10	13	1999
Total	8	4	0	4	10	13	

Source: uefa.com, Last updated on 10 September 2010
Pld = Matches played; W = Matches won; D = Matches drawn; L = Matches lost; GF = Goals for; GA = Goals against. Defunct competitions indicated in italics.

=== By season ===
Season	Competition	Round	Opponent	Home	Away	Agg.
1997–98	Intertoto Cup	Group; 2	(France) Bastia	0–1	–	–
1997–98	Intertoto Cup	Group; 2	(Denmark) Silkeborg	–	0–5	–
1997–98	Intertoto Cup	Group; 2	(Wales) Ebbw Vale	4–0	–	–
1997–98	Intertoto Cup	Group; 2	(Austria) GAK	–	3–1	–
1998–99	Intertoto Cup	R1	(Denmark) Lyngby Boldklub	1–4	1–0	2–4
1999–2000	Intertoto Cup	R1	(Northern Ireland) Newry City F.C.	1–0	0–2	1–2

=== Player records ===
- Most appearances in UEFA club competitions: 8 appearances
  - (Croatia) Nikica Miletić
- Top scorers in UEFA club competitions: 2 goals
  - (Croatia) Mario Bazina
  - (Croatia) Neno Katulić

== Notable coaches ==
- (Croatia) Branko Tucak (1998–1999)
- (Croatia) Milivoj Bračun (2000)
- (Croatia) Gordan Ciprić (2006–07)
- (Croatia) Stjepan Čordaš (2007)
- (Croatia) Vjekoslav Lokica (2007–2008)
- (Croatia) Albert Pobor (2008–2009)
- (Croatia) Damir Mužek (2009–2010)
- (Croatia) Davor Mladina (2010)
- (Croatia) Damir Biškup (interim) (2010)
- (Croatia) Ivan Pudar (2010)
- (Croatia) Davor Mladina (2010–2011)
- (Croatia) Damir Biškup (2011)
- (Croatia) Stjepan Čordaš (2011)
- (Croatia) Zdenko Glumac (2011)
- (Croatia) Dinko Vulelija (2011)
- (Croatia) Krešimir Sunara (2011–2013)
- (Croatia) Krešimir Ganjto (2013)
- (Croatia) Davor Mladina (2013–2014)
- (Croatia) Roy Ferenčina (2014–2015)
- (Albania) Besnik Prenga (2015)
- (Slovenia) Iztok Kapušin (2015)
- (Croatia) Dean Klafurić (2019)
