= Dinko Jeličić =

Croatian football manager

Personal information
- Date of birth: 19 September 1973 (age 53)
- Place of birth: Zagreb, SR Croatia, Yugoslavia

Team information
- Current team: Gorica (manager)

Managerial career
- Years: Team
- 2011–2013: Sesvete
- 2011–2013: Croatia U19
- 2013: Croatia U20
- 2014–2015: Foolad Yazd
- 2015–2017: Novigrad
- 2017–2018: Rudeš
- 2020: Rudeš
- 2021: Kustošija
- 2022: Al Nassr U19
- 2023: Al Nassr (caretaker)
- 2023–2024: Gorica
- 2024–: Bahrain (assistant)

Dinko Jeličić (born 16 September 1973) is a Croatian football coach who is the manager of Gorica.

== Coaching career ==
He was the acting head coach at Al-Nassr, having been appointed to the position following the sacking of Rudi Garcia in 13 April 2023. He has coached in Croatia, Iran, and Saudi Arabia.

== Managerial statistics ==
As of match played 31 May 2023

Managerial record by team and tenure
Team	From	To	Record				
Team	From	To	P	W	D	L	Win %
Sesvete	6 April 2011	14 April 2013	53	20	12	21	37.7
Croatia U19	16 July 2011	31 July 2013	15	8	6	1	53.3
Croatia U20	1 January 2013	31 July 2013	5	2	1	2	40.0
Foolad Yazd	1 July 2014	30 June 2015	23	6	9	8	26.1
Novigrad	6 July 2015	3 January 2017	52	33	11	8	63.5
Rudeš	27 December 2017	10 March 2018	4	1	1	2	25.0
Rudeš	29 July 2020	21 September 2020	6	0	3	3	0.0
Kustošija	30 March 2021	30 June 2021	11	5	2	4	45.5
Al Nassr (caretaker)	13 April 2023	30 June 2023	8	4	2	2	50.0
Total			178	79	48	51	44.4

== Honours ==
Novigrad

- Treća HNL West: 2015–16
