= Iztok Kapušin =

Slovenian footballer and manager (born 1974)

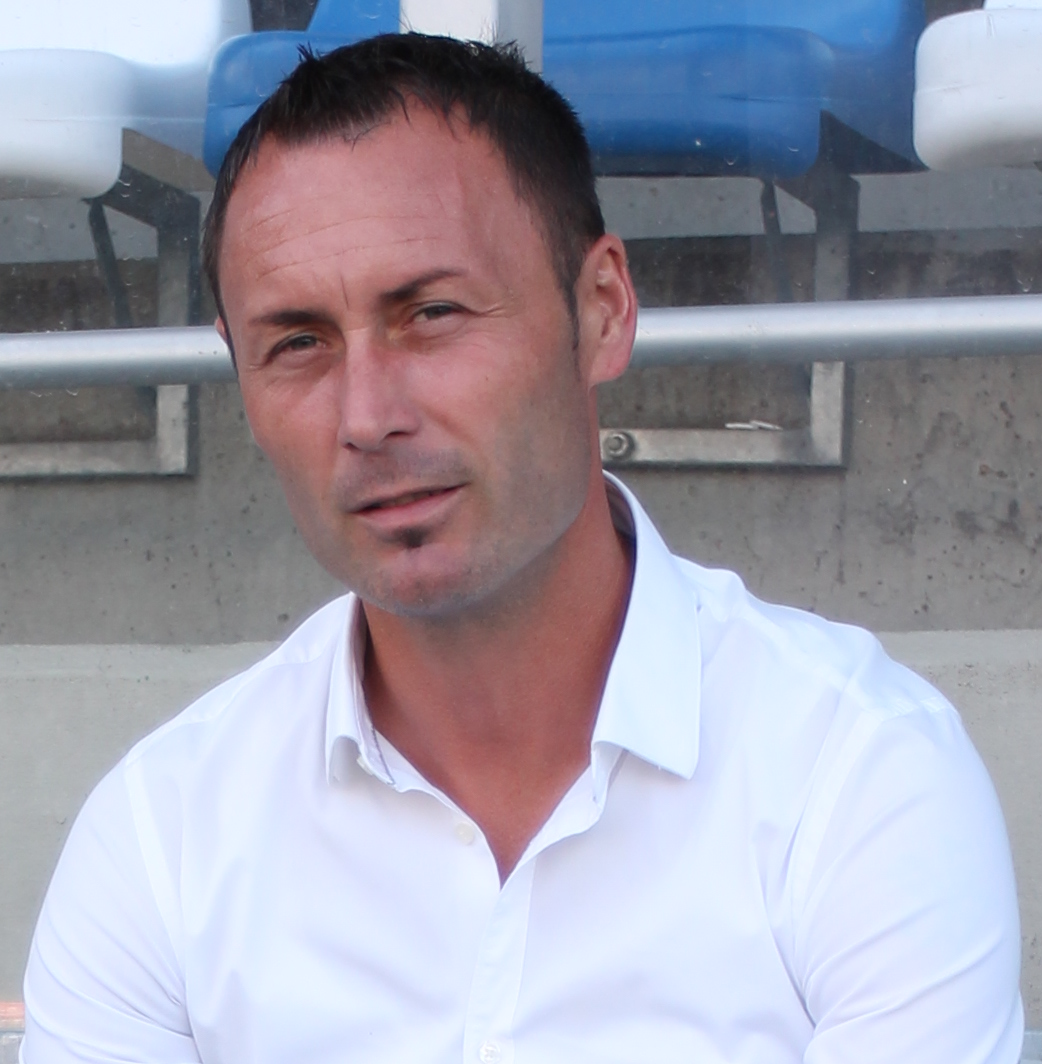

Personal information
- Date of birth: 29 April 1974 (age 52)
- Place of birth: Brežice, SFR Yugoslavia
- Height: 1.84 m (6 ft 0 in)
- Position: Defender

Youth career
- 1980–1986: Brežice

Senior career*
Years	Team	Apps	(Gls)
1986–1993	Brežice		
1993–1994	Naklo	2	(0)
1994–1995	Radeče		
1995–1996	Slavija Vevče		
1996–1997	Domžale		
1997–1999	Krka		
1999–2000	Krško		
2000–2001	Zagorje	10	(0)
2002–2005	Krško		
2005	ASKÖ Wölfnitz	12	(0)
2006	WSV St.Lambrecht	5	(0)
2006–2008	SV St.Margareten/Rosenthal	33	(3)
2008	Krško		

Managerial career
- 2003–2008: Krško
- 2008–2010: Krka
- 2010–2011: Ivančna Gorica
- 2013–2014: Bistra
- 2015: Hrvatski Dragovoljac
- 2015–2016: Celje
- 2016–2017: Krka
- 2017: Hrvatski Dragovoljac
- 2018: Brežice 1919
- 2019–2020: Krško
- 2021–2022: Brežice 1919
- 2025–2026: Brežice 1919
- * Club domestic league appearances and goals

Iztok Kapušin (born 29 April 1974) is a Slovenian football manager and former player.
