= Miroslav Bojko =

Croatian footballer and manager

Personal information
- Date of birth: 30 September 1971 (age 55)
- Place of birth: Vinkovci, SR Croatia, SFR Yugoslavia
- Height: 1.70 m (5 ft 7 in)
- Position: Forward

Senior career*
Years	Team	Apps	(Gls)
1989–1993	Mladost	52	(25)
1993–1996	Cibalia	25	(4)
1996–1997	Otok	42	(24)
1998–1999	Cibalia	32	(21)
1999	Otok	21	(12)
2000	Vukovar '91	12	(3)
2000	Ljubuški	15	(4)
2001	Široki Brijeg	29	(15)
2002	Marsonia	12	(3)
2002–2003	Cibalia	6	(1)

Managerial career
- –2012: Cibalia (assistant)
- 2012: Cibalia (caretaker)
- 2012: Cibalia (caretaker)
- 2012–2013: Cibalia
- 2014–2015: Sheriff Tiraspol (assistant)
- 2015: Cibalia B
- 2015–2016: Cibalia
- 2016–2019: Dugopolje
- 2020–2023: Vukovar 1991
- * Club domestic league appearances and goals

Miroslav Bojko (born 30 September 1971) is a Croatian football manager and former player.

== Coaching career ==
After HNK Cibalia manager Samir Toplak resigned on 27 July 2019, assistant manager Bojo took over as a caretaker manager. He lost his first game the next day against GNK Dinamo Zagreb and later on the same day, Željko Kopić was appointed as manager for the club, with Bojko continued as the assistant manager. After Željko Kopić resigning on 25 November 2012, Bojko became the caretaker once again. Later, he became the permanent manager. He left the club in July 2013.

In the 2013–14 season, Bojko worked as a youth team coach for NK Novigrad.

On 17 May 2016, Bojko was appointed as the manager of NK Dugopolje. After three years at the club, he left on 10 January 2019. He took charge of Vukovar 1991 in November 2020.
