= Roy Ferenčina =

American soccer coach and former player (born 1970)

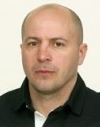

Personal information
- Date of birth: June 4, 1970 (age 56)
- Place of birth: Los Angeles, California, U.S.
- Height: 1.80 m (5 ft 11 in)
- Position: Midfielder

Team information
- Current team: Slaven Belupo (manager)

Senior career*
Years	Team	Apps	(Gls)
- Dinamo Zagreb
- Trešnjevka
1993–1996	Inker Zaprešić	89	(1)
1996–1997	Marsonia	26	(1)
1997	Hrvatski Dragovoljac	7	(1)
1997–2005	Slaven Belupo	172	(11)
Total		289	(14)

Managerial career
- 2006–2007: Slaven Belupo (assistant)
- 2008: Lokomotiva (U19)
- 2009: Lokomotiva (assistant)
- 2009–2010: Lokomotiva
- 2011–2013: Slaven Belupo
- 2013–2014: Vinogradar
- 2014: Shkëndija
- 2014–2015: Hrvatski Dragovoljac
- 2016: Vinogradar
- 2019: Hrvatski Dragovoljac
- 2019–2020: Pyramids (assistant)
- 2021–2022: Kustošija
- 2022–2023: Dinamo Zagreb (assistant)
- 2023–: Slaven Belupo
- * Club domestic league appearances and goals

Roy Ferenčina (born June 4, 1970) is an American soccer manager and former player. He currently works as manager of Croatian Football League club Slaven Belupo.

== Playing career ==
Ferenčina spent his entire career playing for Croatian clubs and he had spells at Dinamo Zagreb, Trešnjevka, Inker Zaprešić, Marsonia and Hrvatski Dragovoljac before coming to Slaven Belupo in 1997. Ferenčina is mainly remembered for his time at Slaven, where he spent the last eight years of his playing career, appearing in a total of 172 matches and scoring 11 goals for the club. Ferenčina retired from football in February 2005 after a fallout with Slaven manager Branko Karačić during the club's winter break friendly game at the Andrija Anković Memorial Tournament.

== Managerial career ==
In the 2006–07 season Ferenčina worked at Slaven Belupo as assistant manager to Elvis Scoria. In January 2008 he was appointed manager of NK Lokomotiva youth team. He then served as assistant manager at Lokomotiva for three months in early 2009, before being appointed as the club's manager in April 2009, replacing Željko Pakasin. Led by Ferenčina, the club gained promotion to Prva HNL first time in their history at the end of the 2008–09 season, and then went on to finish 8th in the 2009–10 Prva HNL.

== Personal life ==
His brother Damir was also a soccer player.
