= Srećko Lušić =

Croatian football manager

Personal information
- Date of birth: 2 January 1959 (age 67)
- Place of birth: Johovac, near Doboj, SFR Yugoslavia
- Position: Midfielder

Senior career*
Years	Team	Apps	(Gls)
1977–1990	Dinamo Vinkovci		

Managerial career
- 1999–2000: Cibalia
- 2001–2002: Brotnjo
- 2003: Cibalia
- 2004–2005: Drava Ptuj
- 2007–2008: Cibalia
- 2009: Croatia Sesvete
- 2009–2010: Zelina
- 2011: Karlovac
- 2012: Rudeš
- * Club domestic league appearances and goals

Srećko Lušić (born 2 January 1959) is a Croatian football manager and former player.

== Managerial career ==
In November 2008, Lušić was sacked as manager of Cibalia. He was dismissed as manager of Karlovac in September 2011, after he had replaced Igor Pamic six months earlier.
