= Davor Mladina =

Croatian football manager (born 1959)

Personal information
- Date of birth: 26 November 1959 (age 66)
- Place of birth: Split, PR Croatia, Yugoslavia

Team information
- Current team: Dubrava (manager)

Managerial career
- Years: Team
- 1999–2000: Vukovar '91
- 2001–2002: Široki Brijeg
- 2003: Marsonia
- 2004–2005: Cibalia
- 2005–2006: Orašje
- 2007: Imotski
- 2008: Mosor
- 2009–2010: Hrvatski Dragovoljac
- 2010–2011: Hrvatski Dragovoljac
- 2011–2012: Primorac 1929
- 2013: GOŠK Gabela
- 2013–2014: Hrvatski Dragovoljac
- 2015: Široki Brijeg
- 2015: Lučko
- 2015–2016: Hrvatski Dragovoljac
- 2016–2017: Lučko
- 2017: Gorica
- 2018–2019: Ras Al-Khaimah
- 2019–2020: Cibalia
- 2020: Horn
- 2021: Međimurje
- 2021–2022: Hrvatski Dragovoljac
- 2022–2023: Rudeš
- 2023: Dugopolje
- 2023-2024: Rudeš
- 2024-: Durava

Davor Mladina (born 26 November 1959) is a Croatian professional football manager. He is the current manager of Croatian Football League club Dubrava.

== Managerial career ==
In March 2021 he took charge of Međimurje and in August 2021 he was appointed for the sixth time by Hrvatski Dragovoljac.

Mladina was named manager of Rudeš in October 2022. He also worked at Imotski, Marsonia, Mosor, Primorac 1929, GOŠK Gabela, Široki Brijeg, Lučko, Gorica, Ras Al-Khaimah, Cibalia and was for one game in charge of Austrian side SV Horn. He also won the Bosnian Cup with Orašje.

== Honours ==
=== Manager ===
Cibalia

- 2. HNL: 2004–05 (North)

Orašje

- Bosnian Cup: 2005–06
