= 2005–06 HNK Rijeka season =

Rijeka
2005–06 season
- Chairman: Robert Ježić
- Manager: Elvis Scoria, Dragan Skočić
- Prva HNL: 2nd
- Croatian Cup: Winners
- UEFA Cup: Qualifying Round 2
- Croatian Supercup: Runners-up
- Top goalscorer: League: Davor Vugrinec (15); All: Davor Vugrinec (19)
- Highest home attendance: 8,000 (3 times - Prva HNL and Croatian Cup)
- Lowest home attendance: 500 vs (Croatia) Varteks (26 November 2005 - Prva HNL)
- Average home league attendance: 4,250

The 2005–06 season was the 60th season in Rijeka's history. It was their 15th season in the Prva HNL and 32nd successive top tier season.

== Competitions ==
Competition	First match	Last match	Starting round	Final position	Record							
Competition	First match	Last match	Starting round	Final position	G	W	D	L	GF	GA	GD	Win %
Prva HNL	23 July 2005	13 May 2006	Matchday 1	2nd	32	20	5	7	61	36	+25	62.50
Croatian Cup	20 September 2005	3 May 2006	First round	Winner	8	6	1	1	22	8	+14	75.00
UEFA Cup	11 August 2005	25 August 2005	QR2	QR2	2	1	0	1	2	2	+0	50.00
Croatian Supercup	–	15 July 2005	–	Runners-up	1	0	0	1	0	1	−1	0.00
Total					43	27	6	10	85	47	+38	62.79

=== Prva HNL ===
==== First stage ====
Pos	Team	Pld	W	D	L	GF	GA	GD	Pts	Qualification
1	Dinamo Zagreb	22	18	2	2	61	11	+50	56	Qualification to championship group
2	Rijeka	22	14	3	5	42	28	+14	45	Qualification to championship group
3	Osijek	22	10	4	8	25	32	−7	34	Qualification to championship group
4	Varteks	22	10	1	11	34	35	−1	31	Qualification to championship group
5	Hajduk Split	22	7	8	7	28	21	+7	29	Qualification to championship group

Source: RSSSF.org
Rules for classification: 1st points; 2nd head-to-head points; 3rd head-to-head goal difference; 4th head-to-head away goals scored

==== Second stage (championship play-off) ====
Pos	Team	Pld	W	D	L	GF	GA	GD	Pts	Qualification
1	Dinamo Zagreb (C)	32	24	4	4	78	21	+57	76	Qualification to Champions League second qualifying round
2	Rijeka	32	20	5	7	61	36	+25	65	Qualification to UEFA Cup first qualifying round
3	Varteks	32	15	2	15	51	48	+3	47	Qualification to UEFA Cup first qualifying round
4	Osijek	32	13	5	14	31	48	−17	44	Qualification to Intertoto Cup second round
5	Hajduk Split	32	10	10	12	40	35	+5	40	
6	Kamen Ingrad	32	11	5	16	33	47	−14	38	

Source: RSSSF.org
Rules for classification: 1st points; 2nd head-to-head points; 3rd head-to-head goal difference; 4th head-to-head away goals scored
(C) Champions

==== Results summary ====
Overall								Home						Away					
Pld	W	D	L	GF	GA	GD	Pts	W	D	L	GF	GA	GD	W	D	L	GF	GA	GD
32	20	5	7	61	36	+25	65	10	5	1	36	15	+21	10	0	6	25	21	+4

==== Results by round ====
Round	1	2	3	4	5	6	7	8	9	10	11	12	13	14	15	16	17	18	19	20	21	22	23	24	25	26	27	28	29	30	31	32
Ground	H	H	A	A	H	A	H	A	H	A	H	A	A	H	H	A	H	A	H	A	H	A	H	A	H	H	A	A	H	A	A	H
Result	D	W	L	W	D	W	W	W	D	W	W	L	L	L	W	W	W	W	W	L	W	W	D	W	W	W	L	W	D	L	W	W
Position	6	4	7	4	4	3	3	2	2	2	2	2	2	3	2	2	2	2	2	2	2	2	2	2	2	2	2	2	2	2	2	2

Source: Competitive matches
A = Away; H = Home; W = Win; D = Draw; L = Loss

== Matches ==
=== Croatian Supercup ===
Match	Date	Venue	Opponent	Score	Attendance	Rijeka Scorers	Report
1	15 Jul	A	Hajduk Split	0 – 1 (aet)	18,000		HRnogomet.com

Source: HRnogomet.com

=== Prva HNL ===
Round	Date	Venue	Opponent	Score	Attendance	Rijeka Scorers	Report
1	23 Jul	H	Pula Staro Češko	2 – 2	4,500	Zekić, Krpan	HRnogomet.com
2	30 Jul	H	Cibalia	4 – 1	3,000	Prpić (3), Krpan	HRnogomet.com
3	6 Aug	A	Dinamo Zagreb	1 – 5	10,000	Krpan	HRnogomet.com
4	14 Aug	A	Osijek	1 – 0	5,000	Ivančić	HRnogomet.com
5	20 Aug	H	Inter Zaprešić	0 – 0	2,000		HRnogomet.com
6	28 Aug	A	Varteks	4 – 1	3,500	Ah. Sharbini (3), Krpan	HRnogomet.com
7	10 Sep	H	Slaven Belupo	4 – 2	4,000	Vugrinec (2), o.g., Ah. Sharbini	HRnogomet.com
8	17 Sep	A	Hajduk Split	1 – 0	14,000	Ah. Sharbini	HRnogomet.com
9	24 Sep	H	Zagreb	0 – 0	4,000		HRnogomet.com
10	1 Oct	A	Kamen Ingrad	1 – 0	2,000	Vugrinec	HRnogomet.com
11	15 Oct	H	Međimurje	4 – 1	4,000	Ah. Sharbini, Novaković (2), Vugrinec	HRnogomet.com
12	22 Oct	A	Pula Staro Češko	0 – 3	3,000		HRnogomet.com
13	26 Oct	A	Cibalia	0 – 4	1,200		HRnogomet.com
14	29 Oct	H	Dinamo Zagreb	0 – 1	8,000		HRnogomet.com
15	5 Nov	H	Osijek	4 – 1	2,000	Ah. Sharbini (2), Vugrinec, Novaković	HRnogomet.com
16	19 Nov	A	Inker Zaprešić	2 – 0	700	Ah. Sharbini, Vugrinec	HRnogomet.com
17	26 Nov	H	Varteks	3 – 1	500	Novaković, Ivančić, Vugrinec	HRnogomet.com
18	3 Dec	A	Slaven Belupo	3 – 1	600	Novaković, Linić (2)	HRnogomet.com
19	18 Feb	H	Hajduk Split	1 – 0	8,000	Novaković	HRnogomet.com
20	25 Feb	A	Zagreb	0 – 2	1,000		HRnogomet.com
21	4 Mar	H	Kamen Ingrad	3 – 1	3,000	Prišć, Novaković, Ah. Sharbini	HRnogomet.com
22	11 Mar	A	Međimurje	4 – 2	1,400	Vugrinec (3), Ah. Sharbini	HRnogomet.com
23	18 Mar	H	Hajduk Split	1 – 1	7,000	Vugrinec	HRnogomet.com
24	25 Mar	A	Dinamo Zagreb	2 – 1	20,000	o.g., Vugrinec	HRnogomet.com
25	1 Apr	H	Kamen Ingrad	3 – 0	4,000	Bobic, Novaković (2)	HRnogomet.com
26	8 Apr	H	Osijek	3 – 1	4,000	Rendulić, Linić, Ah. Sharbini	HRnogomet.com
27	15 Apr	A	Varteks	0 – 1	5,000		HRnogomet.com
28	22 Apr	A	Hajduk Split	4 – 0	3,000	Vugrinec (3), Ah. Sharbini	HRnogomet.com
29	29 Apr	H	Dinamo Zagreb	2 – 2	6,000	Linić, Ah. Sharbini	HRnogomet.com
30	8 May	A	Kamen Ingrad	0 – 1	300		HRnogomet.com
31	10 May	A	Osijek	2 – 0	2,000	Linić (2)	HRnogomet.com
32	13 May	H	Varteks	2 – 1	4,000	Bobic, Tkalčević	HRnogomet.com

Source: HRnogomet.com

=== Croatian Cup ===
Round	Date	Venue	Opponent	Score	Attendance	Rijeka Scorers	Report
R1	20 Sep	A	Jedinstvo Omladinac	2 – 0	1,000	Knežević, Linić	HRnogomet.com
R2	18 Oct	H	Međimurje	3 – 1	1,500	Novaković (2), Zekić	HRnogomet.com
QF	9 Nov	A	Vinogradar	2 – 1	1,200	Zekić, Ah. Sharbini	HRnogomet.com
QF	15 Nov	H	Vinogradar	8 – 0	800	Linić (5), Novaković (2), Ah. Sharbini	HRnogomet.com
SF	29 Mar	A	Hajduk Split	1 – 1	10,000	Vugrinec	HRnogomet.com
SF	5 Apr	H	Hajduk Split	1 – 0	7,000	Novaković	HRnogomet.com
F	26 Apr	H	Varteks	4 – 0	8,000	Vugrinec (2), Linić, Bobic	HRnogomet.com
F	3 May	A	Varteks	1 – 5	7,000	Vugrinec	HRnogomet.com

Source: HRnogomet.com

=== UEFA Cup ===
Round	Date	Venue	Opponent	Score	Attendance	Rijeka Scorers	Report
QR2	11 Aug	A	Litex Lovech (Bulgaria)	0 – 1	4,000		HRnogomet.com
QR2	25 Aug	H	Litex Lovech (Bulgaria)	2 – 1	6,000	Krpan, Rendulić	HRnogomet.com

Source: HRnogomet.com

=== Squad statistics ===
Competitive matches only.
Appearances in brackets indicate numbers of times the player came on as a substitute.

Name	Apps	Goals	Apps	Goals	Apps	Goals	Apps	Goals	Apps	Goals
Name	League		Cup		Europe		Supercup		Total	
(Serbia and Montenegro) Dragan Žilić	29 (0)	0	7 (0)	0	2 (0)	0	0 (0)	0	38 (0)	0
(Croatia) Krunoslav Rendulić	28 (0)	1	8 (0)	0	2 (0)	1	1 (0)	0	39 (0)	2
(Slovakia) Peter Lérant	19 (1)	0	5 (0)	0	1 (0)	0	1 (0)	0	26 (1)	0
(Croatia) Daniel Šarić	25 (3)	0	7 (0)	0	2 (0)	0	1 (0)	0	34 (3)	0
(Croatia) Siniša Linić	29 (0)	6	8 (0)	7	2 (0)	0	1 (0)	0	40 (0)	13
(Croatia) Igor Tkalčević	13 (9)	1	4 (3)	0	1 (0)	0	0 (0)	0	18 (12)	1
(Croatia) Dragan Tadić	27 (5)	0	3 (3)	0	2 (0)	0	1 (0)	0	33 (8)	0
(Croatia) Dario Knežević	28 (1)	0	7 (0)	1	2 (0)	0	1 (0)	0	38 (1)	1
(Croatia) Ahmad Sharbini	23 (5)	14	7 (1)	2	0 (1)	0	0 (0)	0	30 (7)	16
(Bosnia and Herzegovina) (Serbia and Montenegro) Dušan Kerkez	9 (13)	0	6 (1)	0	0 (1)	0	0 (0)	0	15 (15)	0
(Croatia) Davor Vugrinec	23 (1)	15	6 (0)	4	0 (0)	0	0 (0)	0	29 (1)	19
(Croatia) Igor Novaković	20 (6)	9	6 (2)	5	2 (0)	0	0 (1)	0	28 (9)	14
(Croatia) Zoran Ivančić	14 (4)	2	1 (0)	0	2 (0)	0	0 (0)	0	17 (4)	2
(Croatia) Mario Prišć	20 (5)	1	7 (1)	0	1 (1)	0	1 (0)	0	29 (7)	1
(Croatia) Petar Krpan	13 (4)	4	1 (2)	0	2 (0)	1	1 (0)	0	16 (6)	5
(Germany) Fredi Bobic	4 (4)	2	0 (2)	1	0 (0)	0	0 (0)	0	4 (6)	3
(Australia) Eddy Bosnar	8 (0)	0	2 (0)	0	0 (0)	0	0 (0)	0	10 (0)	0
(Croatia) Zoran Zekić	5 (5)	1	2 (2)	2	1 (0)	0	1 (0)	0	9 (7)	3
(Croatia) Anas Sharbini	1 (7)	0	0 (1)	0	0 (0)	0	0 (0)	0	1 (8)	0
(Croatia) Marin Prpić	4 (4)	3	0 (2)	0	0 (2)	0	0 (1)	0	4 (9)	3
(Croatia) (Italy) Fausto Budicin	5 (5)	0	0 (0)	0	0 (0)	0	1 (0)	0	6 (5)	0
(Croatia) Velimir Radman	3 (2)	0	1 (0)	0	0 (0)	0	1 (0)	0	5 (2)	0
(Croatia) Goran Rubil	1 (3)	0	0 (3)	0	0 (0)	0	0 (0)	0	1 (6)	0
(Croatia) Goran Paracki	0 (1)	0	0 (0)	0	0 (0)	0	0 (0)	0	0 (1)	0
(Croatia) Neno Katulić	0 (1)	0	0 (0)	0	0 (0)	0	0 (1)	0	0 (2)	0
(Croatia) Sandi Dobrić	1 (0)	0	0 (0)	0	0 (0)	0	0 (0)	0	1 (0)	0
(Croatia) Krešimir Brkić	0 (1)	0	0 (0)	0	0 (0)	0	0 (0)	0	0 (1)	0

== See also ==
- 2005–06 Prva HNL
- 2005–06 Croatian Cup
- 2005–06 UEFA Cup

== External sources ==
- 2005–06 Prva HNL at HRnogomet.com
- 2005–06 Croatian Cup at HRnogomet.com
- Prvenstvo 2005.-2006. at nk-rijeka.hr
