= 2006 Croatian Football Cup final =

- Event: 2005–06 Croatian Cup
Rijeka	Varteks
5	5
- Rijeka won on away goals rule

First leg
Rijeka	Varteks
4	0
- Date: 26 April 2006
- Venue: Stadion Kantrida, Rijeka
- Man of the Match: Davor Vugrinec (Rijeka)
- Referee: Draženko Kovačić (Križevci)
- Attendance: 8,000
- Weather: Cloudy

Second leg
Varteks	Rijeka
5	1
- Date: 3 May 2006
- Venue: Stadion Varteks, Varaždin
- Man of the Match: Enes Novinić (Varteks)
- Referee: Alojzije Šupraha (Kolan)
- Attendance: 7,000
- Weather: Clear

The 2006 Croatian Cup final was a two-legged affair played between Rijeka and Varteks. The first leg was played in Rijeka on 26 April 2006, while the second leg on 3 May 2006 in Varaždin.

Rijeka won the trophy on away goals rule after was an affair finished on aggregate result of 5–5.

== Road to the final ==
Rijeka		Round	Varteks	
Opponent	Result		Opponent	Result
Jedinstvo Omladinac	2–0	First round	Ogulin	3–2
Međimurje	3–1	Second round	Hrvatski Dragovoljac	2–0
Vinogradar	2–1	Quarter-finals	Naftaš Ivanić	4–1
Vinogradar	8–0	Quarter-finals	Naftaš Ivanić	1–1
Hajduk Split	1–1	Semi-finals	Kamen Ingrad	3–3
Hajduk Split	1–0	Semi-finals	Kamen Ingrad	2–1

== First leg ==
26 April 2006
17:30

Rijeka	4–0	Varteks
Vugrinec 20', 68'; Linić 43'; Bobič 81'	Report (in Croatian)

Stadion Kantrida, Rijeka
Attendance: 8,000
Referee: Draženko Kovačić (Križevci)

RIJEKA:
GK	12	(Serbia and Montenegro) Dragan Žilić
DF	5	(Croatia) Dario Knežević
DF	6	(Slovakia) Peter Lérant
DF	15	(Croatia) Daniel Šarić (c)		(substituted off) 83'
DF	20	(Croatia) Krunoslav Rendulić	(yellow card) 54'
MF	7	(Croatia) Dragan Tadić		(substituted off) 72'
MF	21	(Croatia) Igor Novaković
MF	22	(Croatia) Mario Prišć
MF	25	(Croatia) Siniša Linić
FW	10	(Croatia) Ahmad Sharbini		(substituted off) 57'
FW	30	(Croatia) Davor Vugrinec
Substitutes:
MF	18	(Croatia) Goran Rubil		(substituted on) 57'
FW	9	(Germany) Fredi Bobič		(substituted on) 72'
DF	2	(Croatia) Igor Tkalčević		(substituted on) 83'
Manager:
(Croatia) Dragan Skočić

VARTEKS:
GK	1	(Croatia) Miroslav Koprić
DF	3	(Croatia) Nikola Pokrivač
DF	18	(Croatia) Vladimir Vuk
DF	30	(Croatia) Mario Lučić
MF	4	(Croatia) Dario Jertec	(yellow card) 8'	(substituted off) 61'
MF	10	(Croatia) Nikola Šafarić (c)	(red card) 3'
MF	14	(Croatia) Srebrenko Posavec
MF	29	(Bosnia and Herzegovina) Nedim Halilović
FW	9	(Croatia) Enes Novinić
FW	23	(Croatia) Leon Benko	(yellow card) 51'	(substituted off) 56'
FW	27	(Bosnia and Herzegovina) Ivan Jolić
Substitutes:
FW	17	(Croatia) Milan Pavličić		(substituted on) 56'
MF	11	(Croatia) Teo Kardum		(substituted on) 61'
Manager:
(Croatia) Zlatko Dalić

Assistant referees:
Željko Novosel (Vrbovec)
Željko Grgec (Bistra)

Match rules

- 90 minutes.
- Seven named substitutes.
- Maximum of three substitutions.

== Second leg ==
3 May 2006
20:15

Varteks	5–1	Rijeka
Lučić 23'; Benko 54'; Šafarić 84' (pen.); Novinić 90', 91'	Report (in Croatian)	Vugrinec 77'

Stadion Varteks, Varaždin
Attendance: 7,000
Referee: Alojzije Šupraha (Kolan)

VARTEKS:
GK	12	(Croatia) Ivan Mance
DF	3	(Croatia) Nikola Pokrivač
DF	18	(Croatia) Vladimir Vuk		(substituted off) 60'
DF	30	(Croatia) Mario Lučić		(substituted off) 79'
MF	4	(Croatia) Dario Jertec	(yellow card) 22'
MF	10	(Croatia) Nikola Šafarić (c)
MF	26	(Croatia) Nikola Melnjak		(substituted off) 66'
MF	29	(Bosnia and Herzegovina) Nedim Halilović
FW	9	(Croatia) Enes Novinić	(yellow card) 90'
FW	17	(Croatia) Milan Pavličić
FW	23	(Croatia) Leon Benko
Substitutes:
FW	27	(Bosnia and Herzegovina) Ivan Jolić		(substituted on) 60'
MF	14	(Croatia) Srebrenko Posavec		(substituted on) 66'
FW	20	(Croatia) Dominik Mohorović		(substituted on) 79'
Manager:
(Croatia) Zlatko Dalić

RIJEKA:
GK	12	(Serbia and Montenegro) Dragan Žilić
DF	5	(Croatia) Dario Knežević
DF	6	(Slovakia) Peter Lérant
DF	15	(Croatia) Daniel Šarić (c)
DF	20	(Croatia) Krunoslav Rendulić
MF	21	(Croatia) Igor Novaković
MF	22	(Croatia) Mario Prišć
MF	23	(Bosnia and Herzegovina) Dušan Kerkez	(yellow card) 23'	(substituted off) 38'
MF	25	(Croatia) Siniša Linić	(yellow card) 56'
FW	10	(Croatia) Ahmad Sharbini		(substituted off) 68'
FW	30	(Croatia) Davor Vugrinec
Substitutes:
MF	7	(Croatia) Dragan Tadić		(substituted on) 38'
DF	2	(Croatia) Igor Tkalčević		(substituted on) 68'
Manager:
(Croatia) Dragan Skočić

Assistant referees:
Tomislav Petrović (Valpovo)
Armando Lušetić (Cerovlje)

Match rules

- 90 minutes.
- Penalty shoot-out if scores still level; no extra time.
- Seven named substitutes.
- Maximum of three substitutions.
