= 2004–05 HNK Rijeka season =

Rijeka
2004–05 season
- Chairman: Robert Ježić
- Manager: Elvis Scoria
- Prva HNL: 4th
- Croatian Cup: Winners
- UEFA Cup: Qualifying Round 2
- Top goalscorer: League: Tomislav Erceg (17); All: Tomislav Erceg (26)
- Highest home attendance: 8,000 vs Hajduk Split (12 March 2005 - Prva HNL)
- Lowest home attendance: 500 vs Crikvenica (26 October 2004 - Croatian Cup)
- Average home league attendance: 3,813

The 2004–05 season was the 59th season in Rijeka's history. It was their 14th season in the Prva HNL and 31st successive top tier season.

== Competitions ==
| Competition | First match | Last match | Starting round | Final position | Record | | | | | | | |
| Competition | First match | Last match | Starting round | Final position | G | W | D | L | GF | GA | GD | Win % |
|---|---|---|---|---|---|---|---|---|---|---|---|---|
| Prva HNL | 24 July 2004 | 28 May 2005 | Matchday 1 | 4th | 32 | 11 | 14 | 7 | 52 | 40 | +12 | 34.38 |
| Croatian Cup | 22 September 2004 | 25 May 2005 | First round | Winner | 8 | 6 | 2 | 0 | 18 | 10 | +8 | 75.00 |
| UEFA Cup | 12 August 2004 | 26 August 2004 | QR2 | QR2 | 2 | 1 | 0 | 1 | 2 | 2 | +0 | 50.00 |
| Total | | | | | 42 | 18 | 16 | 8 | 72 | 52 | +20 | 42.86 |

=== Prva HNL ===
==== First stage ====
| Pos | Team | Pld | W | D | L | GF | GA | GD | Pts | Qualification |
|---|---|---|---|---|---|---|---|---|---|---|
| 1 | Hajduk Split | 22 | 13 | 3 | 6 | 39 | 23 | +16 | 42 | Qualification to championship group |
| 2 | Rijeka | 22 | 10 | 8 | 4 | 37 | 23 | +14 | 38 | Qualification to championship group |
| 3 | Slaven Belupo | 22 | 11 | 4 | 7 | 29 | 25 | +4 | 37 | Qualification to championship group |
| 4 | Inter Zaprešić | 22 | 10 | 5 | 7 | 25 | 22 | +3 | 35 | Qualification to championship group |
| 5 | Varteks | 22 | 11 | 1 | 10 | 39 | 30 | +9 | 34 | Qualification to championship group |

Source: RSSSF.org
Rules for classification: 1st points; 2nd head-to-head points; 3rd head-to-head goal difference; 4th head-to-head away goals scored

==== Second stage (championship play-off) ====
| Pos | Team | Pld | W | D | L | GF | GA | GD | Pts | Qualification |
|---|---|---|---|---|---|---|---|---|---|---|
| 1 | Hajduk Split (C) | 32 | 16 | 8 | 8 | 58 | 33 | +25 | 56 | Qualification to Champions League second qualifying round |
| 2 | Inter Zaprešić | 32 | 15 | 9 | 8 | 44 | 39 | +5 | 54 | Qualification to UEFA Cup second qualifying round |
| 3 | NK Zagreb | 32 | 15 | 5 | 12 | 50 | 42 | +8 | 50 | |
| 4 | Rijeka | 32 | 11 | 14 | 7 | 52 | 40 | +12 | 47 | Qualification to UEFA Cup second qualifying round |
| 5 | Varteks | 32 | 14 | 3 | 15 | 53 | 50 | +3 | 45 | Qualification to Intertoto Cup first round |
| 6 | Slaven Belupo | 32 | 12 | 9 | 11 | 37 | 41 | −4 | 45 | Qualification to Intertoto Cup first round |

Source: RSSSF.org
Rules for classification: 1st points; 2nd head-to-head points; 3rd head-to-head goal difference; 4th head-to-head away goals scored
(C) Champions

==== Results summary ====
| Overall | | | | | | | | Home | | | | | | Away | | | | | |
| Pld | W | D | L | GF | GA | GD | Pts | W | D | L | GF | GA | GD | W | D | L | GF | GA | GD |
|---|---|---|---|---|---|---|---|---|---|---|---|---|---|---|---|---|---|---|---|
| 32 | 11 | 14 | 7 | 52 | 40 | +12 | 47 | 10 | 6 | 0 | 35 | 14 | +21 | 1 | 8 | 7 | 17 | 26 | −9 |

==== Results by round ====
| Round | 1 | 2 | 3 | 4 | 5 | 6 | 7 | 8 | 9 | 10 | 11 | 12 | 13 | 14 | 15 | 16 | 17 | 18 | 19 | 20 | 21 | 22 | 23 | 24 | 25 | 26 | 27 | 28 | 29 | 30 | 31 | 32 |
|---|---|---|---|---|---|---|---|---|---|---|---|---|---|---|---|---|---|---|---|---|---|---|---|---|---|---|---|---|---|---|---|---|
| Ground | A | H | A | H | A | H | A | A | H | A | H | H | A | H | A | H | A | H | H | A | H | A | H | A | H | H | A | A | H | A | A | H |
| Result | W | W | D | W | D | W | L | D | W | L | W | W | L | D | D | W | D | W | D | D | W | L | D | D | W | D | L | L | D | L | D | D |
| Position | 3 | 3 | 3 | 2 | 2 | 2 | 2 | 3 | 2 | 2 | 2 | 2 | 2 | 4 | 3 | 3 | 3 | 2 | 2 | 2 | 2 | 2 | 2 | 2 | 2 | 2 | 3 | 3 | 3 | 4 | 4 | 4 |

Source: Competitive matches
A = Away; H = Home; W = Win; D = Draw; L = Loss

== Matches ==
=== Prva HNL ===
| Round | Date | Venue | Opponent | Score | Attendance | Rijeka Scorers | Report |
|---|---|---|---|---|---|---|---|
| 1 | 24 Jul | A | Međimurje | 2 – 1 | 2,500 | Novaković, Brkić | HRnogomet.com |
| 2 | 31 Jul | H | Kamen Ingrad | 2 – 1 | 2,000 | Erceg, Butić | HRnogomet.com |
| 3 | 7 Aug | A | Slaven Belupo | 0 – 0 | 2,200 | | HRnogomet.com |
| 4 | 16 Aug | H | Zadar | 2 – 0 | 2,500 | Erceg (2) | HRnogomet.com |
| 5 | 21 Aug | A | Dinamo Zagreb | 1 – 1 | 5,000 | Butić | HRnogomet.com |
| 6 | 29 Aug | H | Osijek | 4 – 0 | 3,000 | Erceg (2), Tadić, Katulić | HRnogomet.com |
| 7 | 11 Sep | A | Varteks | 0 – 2 | 2,000 | | HRnogomet.com |
| 8 | 18 Sep | A | Pula 1856 | 0 – 0 | 3,500 | | HRnogomet.com |
| 9 | 25 Sep | H | Inter Zaprešić | 2 – 0 | 2,500 | Erceg, Čaval | HRnogomet.com |
| 10 | 2 Oct | A | Hajduk Split | 0 – 2 | 5,000 | | HRnogomet.com |
| 11 | 16 Oct | H | Zagreb | 2 – 1 | 2,000 | Erceg, Ah. Sharbini | HRnogomet.com |
| 12 | 23 Oct | H | Međimurje | 3 – 1 | 1,500 | Erceg, Dunković, Šarić | HRnogomet.com |
| 13 | 30 Oct | A | Kamen Ingrad | 2 – 3 | 1,500 | Čaval, Linić | HRnogomet.com |
| 14 | 6 Nov | H | Slaven Belupo | 1 – 1 | 2,000 | Linić | HRnogomet.com |
| 15 | 13 Nov | A | Zadar | 2 – 2 | 800 | Ivančić, Linić | HRnogomet.com |
| 16 | 20 Nov | H | Dinamo Zagreb | 4 – 2 | 5,000 | Dunković, Linić, Erceg (2) | HRnogomet.com |
| 17 | 27 Nov | A | Osijek | 1 – 1 | 3,000 | Novaković | HRnogomet.com |
| 18 | 4 Dec | H | Varteks | 3 – 0 | 5,000 | Erceg, Katulić, Linić | HRnogomet.com |
| 19 | 26 Feb | H | Pula 1856 | 1 – 1 | 4,000 | Tadić | HRnogomet.com |
| 20 | 5 Mar | A | Inker Zaprešić | 2 – 2 | 1,500 | Lérant, Butić | HRnogomet.com |
| 21 | 12 Mar | H | Hajduk Split | 2 – 0 | 8,000 | Lérant, Mujdža | HRnogomet.com |
| 22 | 19 Mar | A | Zagreb | 1 – 2 | 1,500 | Erceg | HRnogomet.com |
| 23 | 2 Apr | H | Varteks | 1 – 1 | 3,500 | Mitu | HRnogomet.com |
| 24 | 9 Apr | A | Hajduk Split | 1 – 1 | 15,000 | Novaković | HRnogomet.com |
| 25 | 16 Apr | H | Zagreb | 4 – 2 | 3,000 | Erceg (2), Lérant, Katulić | HRnogomet.com |
| 26 | 23 Apr | H | Slaven Belupo | 0 – 0 | 5,000 | | HRnogomet.com |
| 27 | 30 Apr | A | Inker Zaprešić | 2 – 3 | 3,500 | Novaković, Erceg | HRnogomet.com |
| 28 | 7 May | A | Varteks | 1 – 3 | 1,500 | Novaković | HRnogomet.com |
| 29 | 14 May | H | Hajduk Split | 1 – 1 | 7,000 | Erceg | HRnogomet.com |
| 30 | 18 May | A | Zagreb | 1 – 2 | 600 | Erceg | HRnogomet.com |
| 31 | 21 May | A | Slaven Belupo | 1 – 1 | 1,500 | Mitu | HRnogomet.com |
| 32 | 28 May | H | Inter Zaprešić | 3 – 3 | 5,000 | Linić, Katulić (2) | HRnogomet.com |

Source: HRnogomet.com

=== Croatian Cup ===
| Round | Date | Venue | Opponent | Score | Attendance | Rijeka Scorers | Report |
|---|---|---|---|---|---|---|---|
| R1 | 22 Sep | A | Rudeš | 4 – 1 | 1,000 | Linić, Čaval, Knežević, Erceg | HRnogomet.com |
| R2 | 26 Oct | H | Crikvenica | 2 – 1 | 500 | Erceg (2) | HRnogomet.com |
| QF | 8 Mar | H | Slaven Belupo | 1 – 1 | 1,000 | Erceg | HRnogomet.com |
| QF | 16 Mar | A | Slaven Belupo | 2 – 2 | 2,200 | Mitu (2) | HRnogomet.com |
| SF | 20 Apr | H | Varteks | 3 – 2 | 1,500 | Knežević, Erceg (2) | HRnogomet.com |
| SF | 27 Apr | A | Varteks | 3 – 2 | 3,500 | Tadić, Lérant, Katulić | HRnogomet.com |
| F | 1 May | H | Hajduk Split | 2 – 1 | 7,000 | Mitu, Erceg | HRnogomet.com |
| F | 25 May | A | Hajduk Split | 1 – 0 | 20,000 | Mitu | HRnogomet.com |

Source: HRnogomet.com

=== UEFA Cup ===
| Round | Date | Venue | Opponent | Score | Attendance | Rijeka Scorers | Report |
|---|---|---|---|---|---|---|---|
| QR2 | 12 Aug | A | Gençlerbirliği (Turkey) | 0 – 1 | 8,000 | | HRnogomet.com |
| QR2 | 26 Aug | H | Gençlerbirliği (Turkey) | 2 – 1 | 7,000 | Erceg (2) | HRnogomet.com |

Source: HRnogomet.com

=== Squad statistics ===
Competitive matches only.
Appearances in brackets indicate numbers of times the player came on as a substitute.

| Name | Apps | Goals | Apps | Goals | Apps | Goals | Apps | Goals |
| Name | League | | Cup | | Europe | | Total | |
|---|---|---|---|---|---|---|---|---|
| (Croatia) Velimir Radman | 18 (0) | 0 | 6 (0) | 0 | 0 (0) | 0 | 24 (0) | 0 |
| (Croatia) Ivica Marić | 14 (0) | 0 | 2 (0) | 0 | 2 (0) | 0 | 18 (0) | 0 |
| (Slovakia) Peter Lérant | 30 (0) | 3 | 6 (0) | 1 | 2 (0) | 0 | 38 (0) | 4 |
| (Croatia) Daniel Šarić | 19 (2) | 1 | 2 (1) | 0 | 2 (0) | 0 | 23 (3) | 1 |
| (Croatia) Siniša Linić | 29 (2) | 6 | 8 (0) | 1 | 2 (0) | 0 | 39 (2) | 7 |
| (Bosnia and Herzegovina) Jasmin Mujdža | 27 (2) | 1 | 5 (1) | 0 | 2 (0) | 0 | 34 (3) | 1 |
| (Croatia) Kristijan Čaval | 10 (13) | 2 | 6 (1) | 1 | 0 (2) | 0 | 16 (16) | 3 |
| (Croatia) Igor Tkalčević | 20 (3) | 0 | 4 (1) | 0 | 1 (0) | 0 | 25 (4) | 0 |
| (Croatia) Dragan Tadić | 26 (1) | 2 | 8 (0) | 1 | 2 (0) | 0 | 36 (1) | 3 |
| (Croatia) Dario Knežević | 24 (2) | 0 | 8 (0) | 2 | 1 (0) | 0 | 33 (2) | 2 |
| (Croatia) Josip Butić | 15 (7) | 3 | 0 (2) | 0 | 2 (0) | 0 | 17 (9) | 3 |
| (Croatia) Krešimir Brkić | 9 (3) | 1 | 0 (0) | 0 | 2 (0) | 0 | 11 (3) | 1 |
| (Croatia) Ahmad Sharbini | 1 (11) | 1 | 1 (1) | 0 | 0 (1) | 0 | 2 (13) | 1 |
| (Romania) Dumitru Mitu | 12 (2) | 2 | 6 (0) | 4 | 0 (0) | 0 | 18 (2) | 6 |
| (Croatia) Tomislav Erceg | 31 (1) | 17 | 8 (0) | 7 | 2 (0) | 2 | 41 (1) | 26 |
| (Croatia) Igor Novaković | 25 (2) | 5 | 3 (1) | 0 | 2 (0) | 0 | 30 (3) | 5 |
| (Croatia) Neno Katulić | 7 (15) | 5 | 3 (4) | 1 | 0 (1) | 0 | 10 (20) | 6 |
| (Croatia) Antun Dunković | 14 (11) | 2 | 4 (3) | 0 | 0 (0) | 0 | 18 (14) | 2 |
| (Croatia) Zoran Ivančić | 10 (3) | 1 | 4 (2) | 0 | 0 (0) | 0 | 14 (5) | 1 |
| (Croatia) Mario Prišć | 8 (4) | 0 | 4 (2) | 0 | 0 (0) | 0 | 12 (6) | 0 |
| (Croatia) Ivan Sertić | 0 (1) | 0 | 0 (1) | 0 | 0 (0) | 0 | 0 (2) | 0 |
| (Croatia) Marin Prpić | 1 (0) | 0 | 0 (0) | 0 | 0 (0) | 0 | 1 (0) | 0 |
| (Croatia) Sandi Dobrić | 1 (0) | 0 | 0 (0) | 0 | 0 (0) | 0 | 1 (0) | 0 |

== See also ==
- 2004–05 Prva HNL
- 2004–05 Croatian Cup
- 2004–05 UEFA Cup

== External sources ==
- 2004–05 Prva HNL at HRnogomet.com
- 2004–05 Croatian Cup at HRnogomet.com
- Prvenstvo 2004.-2005. at nk-rijeka.hr
