= List of Prva HNL players =

This is a list of Prva HNL players who have made 200 or more appearances in the Croatian First Football League. Statistics are updated as of 16 April 2022.

== Key ==
- † Players with this background and symbol are still playing in the Prva HNL. **Bold** indicates current club.
- The name used for each club is the name they had when player most recently played a league match for them.
- Seasons = number of seasons a player had participated in Prva HNL; Years = a span between the first and most recent year a player had played a match in Prva HNL

== List of players ==
Name	Nationality	Position	Apps	Goals	Prva HNL clubs	Seasons	Years
Jakov Surać	Croatia	MF	453	20	Zadar, Osijek, NK Zagreb	21	1992–2015
Miljenko Mumlek	Croatia	FW	399	106	Varteks, Dinamo Zagreb, Slaven Belupo	17	1992–2010
Damir Vuica	Croatia	DF	372	17	Osijek, Hajduk Split, Kamen Ingrad	18	1992–2008
Krunoslav Rendulić	Croatia	DF	355	20	Osijek, Belišće, Šibenik, NK Zagreb, Hajduk Split, Kamen Ingrad, Rijeka, Lučko	17	1992–2012
Ivan Krstanović	Croatia	FW	346	123	NK Zagreb, Dinamo Zagreb, Rijeka, Zadar, Lokomotiva, Slaven Belupo	13	2008–2023
Davor Vugrinec	Croatia	FW	340	146	Varteks / Varaždin, Rijeka, Dinamo Zagreb, NK Zagreb, Slaven Belupo	15	1993–2015
Mladen Bartolović	Bosnia and Herzegovina	FW	338	78	Segesta, Cibalia, Dinamo Zagreb, NK Zagreb, Hajduk Split	14	1997–2013
Josip Bulat	Croatia	DF	318	14	Šibenik, Hajduk Split, NK Zagreb, Rijeka	14	1992–2007
Damir Krznar	Croatia	DF	315	11	Varteks, Dinamo Zagreb, Inter Zaprešić	17	1992–2009
Nino Bule	Croatia	FW	310	89	NK Zagreb, Hajduk Split, Rijeka, Inter Zaprešić, Lokomotiva	14	1996–2011
Hrvoje Štrok	Croatia	MF	305	41	NK Zagreb, Dinamo Zagreb, Inter Zaprešić, Rijeka	13	2000–2013
Ivica Solomun	Croatia	GK	304	1	Varteks, Belišće, Slaven Belupo	12	1992–2004
Arijan Ademi †	Croatia	MF	303	25	Šibenik, **Dinamo Zagreb**, Lokomotiva	16	2008–
Goran Mujanović	Croatia	MF	300	47	Pomorac, Varteks, Slaven Belupo, Rijeka	12	2002–2014
Nikola Šafarić	Croatia	MF	300	44	Varteks, Rijeka, Slaven Belupo	14	1999–2011
Dominik Livaković	Croatia	GK	297	0	NK Zagreb, Dinamo Zagreb	12	2012–2023
Edin Mujčin	Bosnia and Herzegovina	MF	293	42	Marsonia, Dinamo Zagreb, Kamen Ingrad	12	1994–2007
Roy Ferenčina	Croatia	MF	291	14	Inker Zaprešić, Marsonia, Hrvatski Dragovoljac, Slaven Belupo	12	1993–2004
Kristijan Čaval	Croatia	MF	289	24	Rijeka, Kamen Ingrad, Šibenik, Slaven Belupo	15	1998–2013
Jasmin Agić	Croatia	MF	289	11	Rijeka, Dinamo Zagreb, Croatia Sesvete	13	1993–2010
Mile Škorić	Croatia	MF	289	16	Osijek	14	2008–2023
Mario Lučić	Croatia	DF	286	12	Cibalia, Dinamo Zagreb, Varteks	15	1999–2012
Josip Milardović	Croatia	MF	280	23	Osijek, Međimurje, Cibalia, Slaven Belupo, Inker Zaprešić	11	2002–2013
Bakir Beširević	Bosnia and Herzegovina	MF	279	49	Osijek, Pazinka	10	1992–2002
Aljoša Vojnović	Croatia	FW	277	33	Osijek, Croatia Sesvete, Slaven Belupo, RNK Split, Istra 1961	14	2002–2018
Joško Popović	Croatia	FW	274	111	NK Zagreb, Šibenik, Kamen Ingrad	12	1992–2004
Igor Musa	Croatia	MF	274	51	Dubrovnik, Hrvatski Dragovoljac, Rijeka, Hajduk Split, Slaven Belupo	12	1992–2007
Mateas Delić	Croatia	MF	273	34	Slaven Belupo	12	2006–2020
Goran Paracki †	Croatia	MF	272	8	Rijeka, Karlovac, RNK Split, **Slaven Belupo**, Istra 1961	13	2006–
Marijo Dodik	Bosnia and Herzegovina	FW	271	83	Slaven Belupo, Cibalia, Inter Zaprešić	11	1999–2009
Mario Čižmek	Croatia	MF	269	25	NK Zagreb, Kamen Ingrad, Inter Zaprešić, Croatia Sesvete	13	1994–2010
Petar Bošnjak	Croatia	DF	266	17	Mladost 127, Slaven Belupo	14	1996–2008
Vedran Purić	Croatia	DF	262	2	Slaven Belupo	11	2008–2018
Dražen Pernar	Croatia	DF	254	5	Cibalia	11	1992–2004
Bernard Gulić	Croatia	DF	251	21	Inter Zaprešić, Hrvatski Dragovoljac	14	1997–2012
Zoran Kastel	Croatia	DF	250	11	Osijek, Belišće, Inker Zaprešić, Varteks	13	1992–2005
Mario Čutura	Croatia	MF	249	23	Cibalia, Dinamo Zagreb, NK Zagreb, Croatia Sesvete	12	1996–2009
Ivo Smoje	Croatia	DF	246	21	Kamen Ingrad, Osijek, Hajduk Split	12	2002–2013
Daniel Šarić	Croatia	DF	245	18	Rijeka, Dinamo Zagreb	12	1992–2007
Renato Jurčec	Croatia	FW	244	85	NK Zagreb, Inker Zaprešić, Hajduk Split, Dinamo Zagreb, Slaven Belupo	11	1992–2002
Dumitru Mitu	Romania	FW	244	44	Osijek, Dinamo Zagreb, Rijeka	10	1996–2005
Mario Osibov	Croatia	DF	242	23	Hajduk Split, Zadar, Inker Zaprešić, NK Zagreb	12	1992–2002
Dragan Tadić	Croatia	MF	239	13	Rijeka, Istra, Segesta, Zadar, Istra 1961	11	1992–2010
Damir Milinović	Croatia	DF	238	15	Rijeka, Dinamo Zagreb, NK Zagreb	10	1994–2004
Borimir Perković	Croatia	MF	237	46	Inker Zaprešić, Rijeka, Osijek, Slaven Belupo, Kamen Ingrad, NK Zagreb	12	1992–2004
Dražen Madunović	Croatia	DF	237	9	Varteks, HAŠK Građanski	10	1992–2001
Klaudio Vuković	Croatia	FW	236	59	Šibenik, Samobor, Osijek	11	1992–2003
Anel Karabeg	Bosnia and Herzegovina	MF	236	15	Zadar, NK Zagreb, Šibenik, Osijek	9	1992–2001
Ivan Maroslavac	Croatia	MF	235	10	Cibalia, Rijeka	11	1994–2008
Željko Sopić	Croatia	MF	234	9	NK Zagreb, Slaven Belupo, Lokomotiva	10	1993–2011
Mario Tokić	Croatia	DF	234	6	Rijeka, Dinamo Zagreb, NK Zagreb	11	1993–2011
Domagoj Pavičić †	Croatia	MF	231	27	Lokomotiva, Dinamo Zagreb, **Rijeka**	10	2012–
Dražen Ladić	Croatia	GK	231	1	Dinamo Zagreb	9	1992–2000
Krunoslav Gregorić	Croatia	DF	230	7	Varteks	10	1992–2003
Tomislav Radotić	Croatia	DF	230	4	Cibalia, RNK Split, Osijek	10	2006–2016
Dragan Stojkić	Bosnia and Herzegovina	GK	230	0	Hajduk Split, Samobor, Slaven Belupo, NK Zagreb, Marsonia, Šibenik	12	1995–2008
Igor Čagalj	Croatia	DF	228	1	Inter Zaprešić, Šibenik, Rijeka, Istra 1961, Gorica	10	2005–2019
Krunoslav Jurčić	Croatia	MF	227	42	Inker Zaprešić, Istra, Croatia Zagreb, Slaven Belupo	10	1992–2004
Josip Brezovec	Croatia	MF	227	19	Varteks, Dinamo Zagreb, Slaven Belupo, Rijeka, Inter Zaprešić	12	2007–2019
Fausto Budicin	Croatia	DF	226	13	Rijeka, Istra 1961	9	2005–2014
Stipe Bošnjak	Croatia	DF	226	1	Mladost 127, Slaven Belupo	9	1995–2004
Vlatko Đolonga	Croatia	DF	225	32	Orijent, Hrvatski Dragovoljac, Hajduk Split	11	1996–2007
Tomislav Mazalović	Croatia	MF	225	15	Cibalia, Inter Zaprešić	9	2008–2020
Tomislav Šorša	Croatia	MF	225	12	Osijek	13	2006–2020
Vedran Jugović †	Croatia	MF	224	14	**Osijek**, Rijeka	11	2008–
Dalibor Poldrugač	Croatia	DF	224	7	Dubrava, Dinamo Zagreb, Slaven Belupo, NK Zagreb	13	1994–2011
Dalibor Višković	Croatia	DF	224	2	Rijeka, Slaven Belupo	11	1995–2005
Boris Leutar	Croatia	DF	223	0	Cibalia, Dinamo Zagreb	10	1999–2010
Mate Baturina	Croatia	FW	222	63	Šibenik, NK Zagreb, Hajduk Split, Zadar	9	1994–2007
Srebrenko Posavec	Croatia	MF	222	41	Varteks / Varaždin, Slaven Belupo	11	2000–2011
Darko Raić-Sudar	Croatia	MF	222	23	Cibalia, Osijek, Pula	11	1993–2007
Andrija Balajić	Croatia	DF	222	18	Varteks, Hajduk Split	13	1992–2010
Goran Meštrović	Croatia	MF	221	33	Cibalia, Osijek	10	1992–2002
Goran Roce	Croatia	FW	220	36	Istra 1961, RNK Split, Osijek	10	2009–2018
Josip Balatinac	Croatia	MF	220	33	Osijek, Hajduk Split	10	1997–2006
Hrvoje Vejić	Croatia	DF	220	21	NK Zagreb, Hajduk Split	11	1998–2011
Pavo Crnac	Croatia	DF	220	17	Marsonia, Slaven Belupo	12	1994–2005
Stipe Brnas	Croatia	DF	218	12	Inker Zaprešić, Segesta, Hrvatski Dragovoljac, NK Zagreb	10	1992–2006
Igor Cvitanović	Croatia	FW	216	126	Varteks, Dinamo Zagreb, Osijek	11	1992–2003
Josip Pivarić †	Croatia	DF	216	16	**Lokomotiva**, Dinamo Zagreb	10	2009–
Josip Jurendić	Croatia	MF	215	22	NK Zagreb, RNK Split	10	2006–2017
Nikica Miletić	Croatia	DF	215	12	Inker Zaprešić, Dubrava, Hrvatski Dragovoljac	9	1992–2002
Dino Kresinger	Croatia	FW	213	51	Varteks, Međimurje, Cibalia, Slaven Belupo	10	2001–2012
Dražen Biškup	Croatia	DF	213	3	NK Zagreb	8	1992–2000
Josip Gašpar	Croatia	MF	212	9	Croatia Zagreb, Osijek, Marsonia	11	1992–2002
Ivo Ergović	Croatia	DF	211	12	Belišće, Osijek	9	1993–2001
Ivan Tomečak	Croatia	MF	210	21	Dinamo Zagreb, Rijeka	12	2009–2021
Antun Andričević	Croatia	DF	210	13	Cibalia, Varteks, Kamen Ingrad	11	1995–2007
Sammir	Croatia	MF	208	48	Dinamo Zagreb, Lokomotiva	11	2007–2021
Mario Meštrović	Croatia	DF	208	24	Cibalia, Hajduk Split, Rijeka	9	1992–2002
Franko Andrijašević	Croatia	MF	207	67	Hajduk Split, Dinamo Zagreb, Lokomotiva, Rijeka	10	2010–2021
Stipe Bačelić-Grgić †	Croatia	MF	206	39	**Šibenik**, Istra 1961, Hrvatski Dragovoljac, Slaven Belupo	9	2009–
Mihael Mikić	Croatia	DF	206	28	Dinamo Zagreb, Rijeka	10	1998–2008
Tomislav Šarić	Croatia	MF	206	23	Inter Zaprešić, Osijek, RNK Split	8	2008–2018
Zoran Kvržić †	Bosnia and Herzegovina	MF	206	19	Osijek, Rijeka, **Slaven Belupo**	10	2010–
Mladen Matković	Croatia	GK	206	0	Cibalia, Zadar, Inter Zaprešić	8	2010–2020
Leon Benko	Croatia	FW	205	74	Varteks, Slaven Belupo, Rijeka, Varaždin	9	2003–2021
Slavko Blagojević †	Croatia	MF	205	15	Cibalia, Lučko, **Istra 1961**, RNK Split	10	2006–
Dalibor Zebić	Croatia	DF	205	7	Primorac, NK Zagreb, Zadar, Osijek	10	1994–2005
Josip Bilaver	Croatia	DF	203	5	Zadar	11	2003–2015
Darko Jozinović	Croatia	DF	203	4	Cibalia, Hajduk Split, Hrvatski Dragovoljac	10	1992–2004
Siniša Linić	Croatia	MF	202	23	Rijeka, Hajduk Split, Istra 1961	10	2000–2012
Šime Gržan	Croatia	MF	202	20	Zadar, Lokomotiva, Istra 1961, Osijek	11	2011–2021
Tomislav Rukavina	Croatia	DF	202	6	Osijek, NK Zagreb, Croatia Zagreb, Hajduk Split	10	1992–2005
Mislav Oršić †	Croatia	FW	201	69	Inter Zaprešić, **Dinamo Zagreb**	8	2009–
Srđan Andrić	Croatia	MF	201	26	Hajduk Split	10	2000–2012
Anas Sharbini	Croatia	MF	200	54	Rijeka, Hajduk Split	10	2005–2015
Danijel Hrman	Croatia	MF	200	17	Varteks, Dinamo Zagreb, Hajduk Split	10	1997–2008
