= 2006–07 HNK Rijeka season =

Rijeka
2006–07 season
- Chairman: Robert Ježić
- Manager: Dragan Skočić, Milivoj Bračun, Josip Kuže
- Prva HNL: 7th
- Croatian Cup: Semifinal
- UEFA Cup: Qualifying Round 1
- Croatian Supercup: Runners-up
- Top goalscorer: League: Ahmad Sharbini (21); All: Ahmad Sharbini (25)
- Highest home attendance: 8,000 vs (Croatia) Dinamo Zagreb (17 February 2007 - Prva HNL)
- Lowest home attendance: 300 vs (Croatia) Konavljanin (22 November 2006 - Croatian Cup)
- Average home league attendance: 2,019

The 2006–07 season was the 61st season in Rijeka's history. It was their 16th season in the Prva HNL and 33rd successive top tier season.

== Competitions ==
Competition	First match	Last match	Starting round	Final position	Record							
Competition	First match	Last match	Starting round	Final position	G	W	D	L	GF	GA	GD	Win %
Prva HNL	30 July 2006	19 May 2007	Matchday 1	7th	33	12	6	15	51	53	−2	36.36
Croatian Cup	20 September 2006	4 April 2007	First round	Semifinal	6	2	2	2	8	7	+1	33.33
UEFA Cup	13 July 2006	27 July 2006	QR1	QR1	2	0	1	1	3	4	−1	0.00
Croatian Supercup	–	19 July 2006	–	Runners-up	1	0	0	1	1	4	−3	0.00
Total					42	14	9	19	63	68	−5	33.33

=== Prva HNL ===
==== Classification ====
Pos	Team	Pld	W	D	L	GF	GA	GD	Pts	Qualification or relegation
5	Slaven Belupo (Note: Qualified for Europe as 2006–07 Croatian Football Cup finalists.)	33	14	7	12	40	37	+3	49	Qualification to UEFA Cup first qualifying round
6	Osijek	33	11	10	12	42	45	−3	43	
7	Rijeka	33	12	6	15	51	53	−2	42	
8	Varteks	33	12	6	15	49	62	−13	42	
9	Međimurje	33	11	4	18	40	60	−20	37	

Source: prva-hnl.hr (in Croatian)
Rules for classification: 1) points; 2) goal difference; 3) number of goals scored.

==== Results summary ====
Overall								Home						Away					
Pld	W	D	L	GF	GA	GD	Pts	W	D	L	GF	GA	GD	W	D	L	GF	GA	GD
33	12	6	15	51	53	−2	42	7	3	6	29	23	+6	5	3	9	22	30	−8

==== Results by round ====
Round	1	2	3	4	5	6	7	8	9	10	11	12	13	14	15	16	17	18	19	20	21	22	23	24	25	26	27	28	29	30	31	32	33
Ground	A	H	A	A	H	A	H	A	H	A	H	H	A	H	H	A	H	A	H	A	H	A	A	A	H	A	H	A	H	A	H	A	H
Result	W	W	L	L	L	L	D	L	L	W	L	W	W	W	W	L	D	L	L	D	W	W	L	D	W	L	L	L	D	W	L	D	W
Position	3	2	5	6	6	8	8	10	10	10	10	10	8	7	5	6	7	7	8	9	8	7	7	7	6	6	6	6	6	6	7	8	7

Source: Competitive matches
A = Away; H = Home; W = Win; D = Draw; L = Loss

== Matches ==
=== Croatian Supercup ===
Match	Date	Venue	Opponent	Score	Attendance	Rijeka Scorers	Report
1	19 Jul	A	Dinamo Zagreb	1 – 4	15,000	Bolić	HRnogomet.com

Source: HRnogomet.com

=== Prva HNL ===
Round	Date	Venue	Opponent	Score	Attendance	Rijeka Scorers	Report
1	30 Jul	A	Cibalia	4 – 3	2,500	Bolić, Tkalčević, Ah. Sharbini, Rubil	HRnogomet.com
2	5 Aug	H	Kamen Ingrad	4 – 2	2,000	Bolić (3), Ah. Sharbini	HRnogomet.com
3	12 Aug	A	Zagreb	0 – 1	1,500		HRnogomet.com
4	19 Aug	A	Slaven Belupo	2 – 3	2,000	Ah. Sharbini (2)	HRnogomet.com
5	26 Aug	H	Hajduk Split	0 – 1	6,000		HRnogomet.com
6	9 Sep	A	Varteks	1 – 2	3,000	Prišć	HRnogomet.com
7	16 Sep	H	Osijek	2 – 2	2,000	Ah. Sharbini, Linić	HRnogomet.com
9	30 Sep	H	Šibenik	1 – 3	1,200	Ah. Sharbini	HRnogomet.com
10	14 Oct	A	Pula	3 – 2	2,500	Toñito (2), Bule	HRnogomet.com
11	21 Oct	H	Međimurje	1 – 3	1,000	Tkalčević	HRnogomet.com
12	28 Oct	H	Cibalia	4 – 1	1,500	Ah. Sharbini (3), Toñito	HRnogomet.com
8	31 Oct	A	Dinamo Zagreb	0 – 1	1,200		HRnogomet.com
13	4 Nov	A	Kamen Ingrad	1 – 0	300	Toñito	HRnogomet.com
14	8 Nov	H	Zagreb	2 – 1	1,000	Bule (2)	HRnogomet.com
15	11 Nov	H	Slaven Belupo	2 – 0	2,000	Ah. Sharbini (2)	HRnogomet.com
16	18 Nov	A	Hajduk Split	0 – 3	6,500		HRnogomet.com
17	25 Nov	H	Varteks	2 – 2	1,000	Kerkez, Ah. Sharbini	HRnogomet.com
18	2 Dec	A	Osijek	0 – 1	1,000		HRnogomet.com
19	17 Feb	H	Dinamo Zagreb	2 – 3	8,000	Ivanov, Štrok	HRnogomet.com
20	24 Feb	A	Šibenik	2 – 2	3,500	Ivanov, Ah. Sharbini	HRnogomet.com
21	3 Mar	H	Pula	2 – 0	2,000	Ah. Sharbini, Ivanov	HRnogomet.com
22	10 Mar	A	Međimurje	2 – 1	1,500	Starčević, Ah. Sharbini	HRnogomet.com
23	17 Mar	A	Dinamo Zagreb	0 – 1	5,000		HRnogomet.com
24	31 Mar	A	Međimurje	1 – 1	1,200	Budicin	HRnogomet.com
25	7 Apr	H	Varteks	3 – 0	1,000	Ah. Sharbini (2), Novaković	HRnogomet.com
26	14 Apr	A	Slaven Belupo	0 – 3	1,800		HRnogomet.com
27	18 Apr	H	Osijek	0 – 2	1,000		HRnogomet.com
28	21 Apr	A	Šibenik	1 – 3	2,500	Novaković	HRnogomet.com
29	28 Apr	H	Pula	1 – 1	800	Brajković	HRnogomet.com
30	2 May	A	Zagreb	3 – 1	1,000	Ah. Sharbini (3)	HRnogomet.com
31	5 May	H	Cibalia	1 – 2	1,000	Ah. Sharbini	HRnogomet.com
32	12 May	A	Hajduk Split	2 – 2	2,500	Budicin, Ivanov	HRnogomet.com
33	19 May	H	Kamen Ingrad	2 – 0	800	Bule, Sertić	HRnogomet.com

Source: HRnogomet.com

=== Croatian Cup ===
Round	Date	Venue	Opponent	Score	Attendance	Rijeka Scorers	Report
R1	20 Sep	A	Đakovo	2 – 1	1,500	Ah. Sharbini (2)	HRnogomet.com
R2	25 Oct	A	Hrvatski Dragovoljac	0 – 0 (5–3 p)	2,500		HRnogomet.com
QF	22 Nov	H	Konavljanin	3 – 1	300	Ah. Sharbini, Kerkez, Bule	HRnogomet.com
QF	29 Nov	A	Konavljanin	1 – 2	2,500	Žilić	HRnogomet.com
SF	13 Mar	H	Slaven Belupo	0 – 0	3,000		HRnogomet.com
SF	4 Apr	A	Slaven Belupo	2 – 3	3,000	Ah. Sharbini, Ivanov	HRnogomet.com

Source: HRnogomet.com

=== UEFA Cup ===
Round	Date	Venue	Opponent	Score	Attendance	Rijeka Scorers	Report
QR1	13 Jul	H	Omonia (Cyprus)	2 – 2	7,000	Bule, Kerkez	HRnogomet.com
QR1	27 Jul	A	Omonia (Cyprus)	1 – 2	18,000	Lukunić	HRnogomet.com

Source: HRnogomet.com

=== Squad statistics ===
Competitive matches only.
Appearances in brackets indicate numbers of times the player came on as a substitute.

Name	Apps	Goals	Apps	Goals	Apps	Goals	Apps	Goals	Apps	Goals
Name	League		Cup		Europe		Supercup		Total	
(Serbia) Dragan Žilić	27 (0)	0	6 (0)	1	2 (0)	0	1 (0)	0	36 (0)	1
(Croatia) Krunoslav Rendulić	28 (0)	0	4 (0)	0	2 (0)	0	1 (0)	0	35 (0)	0
(Slovakia) Peter Lérant	15 (0)	0	4 (0)	0	1 (1)	0	0 (0)	0	20 (1)	0
(Croatia) Daniel Šarić	20 (3)	0	5 (0)	0	1 (0)	0	1 (0)	0	27 (3)	0
(Croatia) Siniša Linić	23 (3)	1	6 (0)	0	2 (0)	0	1 (0)	0	32 (3)	1
(Croatia) Igor Tkalčević	15 (0)	2	3 (1)	0	1 (0)	0	0 (0)	0	19 (1)	2
(Croatia) Ahmad Sharbini	16 (11)	21	4 (2)	4	1 (1)	0	0 (0)	0	21 (14)	25
(Bosnia and Herzegovina) Dušan Kerkez	19 (0)	1	2 (1)	1	2 (0)	1	1 (0)	0	24 (1)	3
(Croatia) Nino Bule	19 (2)	4	3 (2)	1	2 (0)	1	0 (0)	0	24 (4)	6
(Croatia) Manuel Pamić	12 (8)	0	2 (0)	0	0 (2)	0	0 (1)	0	14 (11)	0
(Croatia) Mario Prišć	17 (5)	1	5 (0)	0	2 (0)	0	1 (0)	0	25 (5)	1
(Spain) Toñito	16 (4)	4	4 (1)	0	0 (0)	0	0 (0)	0	20 (5)	4
(Croatia) Mihael Mikić	12 (3)	0	1 (2)	0	1 (0)	0	1 (0)	0	15 (5)	0
(Croatia) Duje Baković	17 (0)	0	2 (0)	0	0 (0)	0	0 (0)	0	19 (0)	0
(Croatia) Fausto Budicin	11 (2)	2	1 (1)	0	0 (0)	0	0 (0)	0	12 (3)	2
(Croatia) Dalibor Starčević	15 (0)	1	4 (0)	0	0 (0)	0	0 (0)	0	19 (0)	1
(Bulgaria) Georgi Ivanov	11 (2)	4	2 (0)	1	0 (0)	0	0 (0)	0	13 (2)	5
(Croatia) Luka Vučko	12 (0)	0	2 (0)	0	0 (0)	0	0 (0)	0	14 (0)	0
(Croatia) Dragan Tadić	2 (9)	0	1 (1)	0	1 (0)	0	0 (1)	0	4 (11)	0
(Croatia) Josip Lukunić	7 (5)	0	1 (2)	0	0 (1)	1	0 (1)	0	8 (9)	1
(Croatia) Igor Novaković	7 (4)	2	0 (2)	0	0 (0)	0	0 (0)	0	7 (6)	2
(Croatia) Mate Brajković	3 (8)	1	0 (0)	0	0 (0)	0	0 (0)	0	3 (8)	1
(Croatia) Goran Rubil	5 (5)	1	0 (1)	0	1 (1)	0	1 (0)	0	7 (7)	1
(Croatia) Dario Knežević	5 (0)	0	0 (0)	0	2 (0)	0	1 (0)	0	8 (0)	0
(Croatia) Anas Sharbini	4 (4)	0	1 (0)	0	0 (0)	0	0 (0)	0	5 (4)	0
(Croatia) Vedran Turkalj	7 (1)	0	0 (0)	0	0 (0)	0	0 (0)	0	7 (1)	0
(Croatia) Velimir Radman	6 (0)	0	0 (0)	0	0 (0)	0	0 (0)	0	6 (0)	0
(Croatia) Hrvoje Štrok	4 (2)	1	2 (0)	0	0 (0)	0	0 (0)	0	6 (2)	1
(Bosnia and Herzegovina) Elvir Bolić	5 (1)	4	0 (0)	0	0 (0)	0	1 (0)	1	6 (1)	5
(Croatia) Domagoj Verhas	2 (2)	0	1 (0)	0	0 (0)	0	0 (0)	0	3 (2)	0
(Croatia) Admir Malkić	0 (5)	0	0 (0)	0	0 (0)	0	0 (0)	0	0 (5)	0
(Croatia) Ivan Sertić	0 (4)	1	0 (1)	0	0 (0)	0	0 (0)	0	0 (5)	1
(Croatia) Edin Junuzović	0 (2)	0	0 (0)	0	0 (0)	0	0 (0)	0	0 (2)	0
(Croatia) Ivor Weitzer	0 (1)	0	0 (0)	0	0 (0)	0	0 (0)	0	0 (1)	0
(Croatia) Mateo Bertoša	1 (0)	0	0 (0)	0	0 (0)	0	0 (0)	0	1 (0)	0
(Australia) Eddy Bosnar	0 (0)	0	0 (0)	0	1 (0)	0	1 (0)	0	2 (0)	0

== See also ==
- 2006–07 Prva HNL
- 2006–07 Croatian Cup
- 2006–07 UEFA Cup

== External sources ==
- 2006–07 Prva HNL at HRnogomet.com
- 2006–07 Croatian Cup at HRnogomet.com
- Prvenstvo 2006.-2007. at nk-rijeka.hr
