= 2005 Croatian Football Super Cup =

Hajduk Split	Rijeka
1	0
- After extra time
- Date: 15 July 2005
- Venue: Stadion Poljud, Split
- Man of the Match: Niko Kranjčar (Hajduk Split)
- Referee: Željko Širić (Osijek)
- Attendance: 18,000
- Weather: Clear

The 2005 Croatian Football Super Cup was the seventh edition of the Croatian Football Super Cup, a football match contested by the winners of the previous season's Croatian First League and Croatian Football Cup competitions. The match was played on 15 July 2005 at Stadion Poljud in Split between 2004–05 Croatian First League winners Hajduk Split and 2004–05 Croatian Football Cup winners Rijeka.

== Match details ==
15 July 2005
21:00 CEST

Hajduk Split	1–0 (a.e.t.)	Rijeka
Kranjčar 103'	Report (in Croatian)

Stadion Poljud, Split
Attendance: 18,000
Referee: Željko Širić (Osijek)

HAJDUK SPLIT:
GK	19	(Croatia) Tvrtko Kale
DF	6	(Croatia) Vlatko Đolonga (c)		(substituted off) 77'
DF	13	(Croatia) Mladen Bartulović
DF	17	(Croatia) Tonči Žilić
DF	18	(Croatia) Goran Granić
MF	4	(Bosnia and Herzegovina) Dario Damjanović
MF	21	(Bosnia and Herzegovina) Bulend Biščević	(yellow card) 26'	(substituted off) 65'
MF	24	(Croatia) Mario Grgurović
FW	8	(Bosnia and Herzegovina) Dragan Blatnjak		(substituted off) 102'
FW	10	(Croatia) Niko Kranjčar
FW	30	(Croatia) Tomislav Bušić
Substitutes:
MF	26	(Uruguay) Pablo Munhoz		(substituted on) 65'
DF	21	(Bosnia and Herzegovina) Josip Ćutuk		(substituted on) 77'
FW	16	(Croatia) Krešimir Makarin		(substituted on) 102'
Manager:
(Croatia) Miroslav Blažević

RIJEKA:
GK	1	(Croatia) Velimir Radman
DF	5	(Croatia) Dario Knežević
DF	6	(Slovakia) Peter Lérant
DF	15	(Croatia) Daniel Šarić (c)	(substituted off) 68'
DF	16	(Croatia) Fausto Budicin
DF	20	(Croatia) Krunoslav Rendulić
MF	7	(Croatia) Dragan Tadić
MF	22	(Croatia) Mario Prišć
FW	9	(Croatia) Zoran Zekić
FW	13	(Croatia) Petar Krpan	(substituted off) 75'
FW	25	(Croatia) Siniša Linić	(substituted off) 105'
Substitutes:
MF	3	(Croatia) Marin Prpić	(substituted on) 68'
MF	21	(Croatia) Igor Novaković	(substituted on) 75'
FW	11	(Croatia) Neno Katulić	(substituted on) 105'
Manager:
(Croatia) Elvis Scoria

Assistant referees:
Predrag Borovec (Višnjevac)
Tomislav Šetka (Đakovo)

Match rules

- 90 minutes.
- 30 minutes of extra-time if necessary.
- Penalty shoot-out if scores still level
- Seven named substitutes.
- Maximum of three substitutions.
