= Melnjak =

Melnjak is a Croatian surname. Notable people with the surname include:

- Dario Melnjak (born 1992), Croatian footballer
- Nikola Melnjak (born 1981), Croatian footballer
