= NK ZET =

Croatian football club

- Full name: NK ZET Zagreb
- Founded: 1927
- Ground: Igralište na Trstiku / Igralište na Savici
- Capacity: ?

NK ZET is a Croatian football club based in the city of Zagreb.

In the early 21st century, NK ZET has been competing in the Croatian Third Football League. They placed in the round of 16 in the 2005–06 Croatian Football Cup.

== Former players ==
- Marko Pjaca
- Antonio Marin
