= Ahmad Sharbini =

Croatian former professional footballer (born 1984)

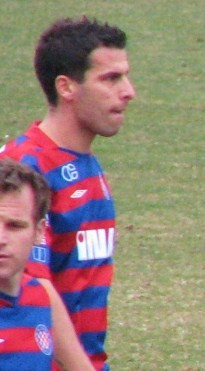
- Sharbini with Hajduk Split in 2010

Personal information
- Date of birth: 21 February 1984 (age 42)
- Place of birth: Rijeka, SR Croatia, Yugoslavia
- Height: 1.84 m (6 ft 0 in)
- Position: Striker

Team information
- Current team: OŠK Omišalj
- Number: 9

Senior career*
Years	Team	Apps	(Gls)
2003–2007	Rijeka	86	(39)
2007	Al-Wahda	7	(3)
2008	Luzern	3	(0)
2008–2009	Rijeka	31	(15)
2009–2012	Hajduk Split	37	(5)
2012	Istra 1961	6	(0)
2013	Al-Wehda	10	(3)
2013	Jedinstvo Bihać	3	(0)
2015–2016	Rječina	9	(6)
2016–2017	Grobničan	31	(7)
2020–	OŠK Omišalj	69	(58)

International career^{‡}
2000–2001	Croatia U17	5	(0)
2002	Croatia U18	1	(0)
2001–2002	Croatia U19	6	(0)
2004	Croatia U20	4	(7)
2004–2006	Croatia U21	8	(1)
- * Club domestic league appearances and goals as of 2023-9-14 ‡ National team caps and goals as of 2006-08-15

Ahmad Sharbini (Arabic: أحمد الشربيني; born 21 February 1984) is a Croatian football former professional player who is playing as a striker, and working as a sporting director for OŠK Omišalj.

== Club career ==
Ahmad Sharbini began his professional career with HNK Rijeka in the Croatian Prva HNL in January 2003, when he signed his first professional contract. In the first four seasons with the club, he scored 39 league goals and 9 cup goals. With 21 goals to his account, he was the club's leading goalscorer in the 2006–07 season. He was also the league's second top goalscorer behind Eduardo da Silva. In late 2007 and early 2008, he had stints with Al-Wahda FC (Abu Dhabi) and FC Luzern. In mid-2008, Sharbini returned to Rijeka, and in the 2008–09 season, with 17 goals in all competitions, he was the club's joint top goalscorer with his brother Anas Sharbini.

After the first league match in the new season, on 13 August 2009, he signed for Hajduk Split with his brother Anas. During his three years with Hajduk, Ahmad scored only 5 goals and most of the time struggled to make the starting line-up. Following his departure from Hajduk, he had three short stints in late 2012 and 2013, with NK Istra 1961, Al-Wehda Club (Mecca) and NK Jedinstvo Bihać, respectively.

Following an 18-month break, since August 2015, Ahmad has been playing for NK Rječina in Croatia's fifth tier. Since mid-2014, he has also been serving as the club's chairman, and in 2016, the coach. Since 2016, and at the same time, he also played for NK Grobničan.

In 2020, Sharbini returned to football, joining OSK Omišalj, where he would take the position of sports director mid-2022 as well.

== International career ==
Sharbini played in the 2001 FIFA U-17 World Championship in Trinidad and Tobago. He also played for Croatia national under-21 football team. He was capped last on 15 August 2006, against Italy national under-21 football team.

== Career statistics ==
Season	Club	League	League		Cup		Continental		Total	
Season	Club	League	Apps	Goals	Apps	Goals	Apps	Goals	Apps	Goals
2003–04	Rijeka	Prva HNL	18	3	5	3	–		23	6
2004–05	Rijeka	Prva HNL	13	1	2	0	1	0	16	1
2005–06	Rijeka	Prva HNL	28	14	8	2	1	0	37	16
2006–07	Rijeka	Prva HNL	27	21	6	4	2	0	35	25
2007	Al-Wahda	UAE Football League	7	3	–		2	0	9	3
2008	Luzern	Swiss Super League	3	0	–		–		3	0
2008–09	Rijeka	Prva HNL	30	12	3	5	–		33	17
2009	Rijeka	Prva HNL	1	3	–		3	2	4	5
2009–10	Hajduk Split	Prva HNL	9	0	1	0	–		10	0
2010–11	Hajduk Split	Prva HNL	13	2	1	0	–		14	2
2011–12	Hajduk Split	Prva HNL	15	3	3	0	2	0	20	3
2012	Istra 1961	Prva HNL	6	0	1	0	–		7	0
2013	Al-Wehda	Saudi First Division	10	3	–		–		10	3
2013	Jedinstvo Bihać	First Div of FBiH	3	0	–		–		3	0
Rijeka total			117	54	24	14	7	2	148	70
Hajduk total			37	5	5	0	2	0	44	5
Career total			183	65	30	14	11	2	224	81
Last Update: 31 December 2013.

== Personal life ==
Sharbini is the older brother of fellow retired footballer Anas Sharbini. He is of Albanian, Croatian and Palestinian descent. He was born in Rijeka to a local Albanian Croatian mother and Palestinian father, Jamal Al-Sharbini, who is from Damascus, Syria.

== Achievements ==
Ahmad Sharbini is HNK Rijeka's leading goalscorer in the Croatian First Football League and the Croatian Football Cup with 54 and 14 goals to his account, respectively.

Brothers Ahmad and Anas Sharbini are the only siblings to have scored a hat-trick each in a single match in top-tier European football leagues. In the first round fixture of the 2009–10 Croatian First Football League season against NK Lokomotiva, the brothers took turns. Ahmad opened the scoring after four minutes, Anas doubled the lead in the 27th minute and Ahmad made it 3–0 in the 35th minute. In the second half Anas converted a penalty in 51st minute, Ahmad completed his hat-trick in the 68th minute and two minutes later Anas scored his third goal.

== Honours ==
HNK Rijeka

- Croatian Football Cup: 2005, 2006

HNK Hajduk Split

- Croatian Football Cup: 2010

Grobničan

- 4. HNL – Zapad: 2017–18

Records

- Most goals for HNK Rijeka in all official matches since 1974–75: 70 goals
- Most goals for HNK Rijeka in Croatian First Football League: 54 goals
- Most goals for HNK Rijeka in Croatian Football Cup: 14 goals
- Most goals for HNK Rijeka in Adriatic derby: 7 goals
- Most goals for HNK Rijeka in one season in Croatian First Football League: 21 goals (shared with Andrej Kramarić)
- Most goals for HNK Rijeka scored against single opposition: 9 goals
- Most braces for HNK Rijeka: 10 (including hat-tricks)
- Most hat-tricks for HNK Rijeka: 4
- Second all-time league goalscorer for HNK Rijeka: 54 goals
