= Ivica Marić (footballer) =

Croatian footballer

Personal information
- Date of birth: 3 September 1974 (age 52)
- Place of birth: Derventa
- Height: 1.91 m (6 ft 3 in)
- Position: Goalkeeper

Senior career*
Years	Team	Apps	(Gls)
1995–2004	Cibalia	127	(0)
2004–2005	Rijeka	14	(0)
2006–2007	Cibalia	10	(0)
- * Club domestic league appearances and goals

Ivica Marić (born 3 September 1974) is a Croatian retired football goalkeeper.
