= Dario Knežević =

Croatian footballer (born 1982)

Personal information
- Full name: Dario Knežević
- Date of birth: 20 April 1982 (age 44)
- Place of birth: Rijeka, SFR Yugoslavia
- Height: 1.84 m (6 ft 0 in)
- Position: Defender

Youth career
- NK Omladinac Vrata
- 1995–2000: Orijent

Senior career*
Years	Team	Apps	(Gls)
2000–2002	Orijent	32	(0)
2002–2006	Rijeka	89	(0)
2006–2012	Livorno	130	(3)
2008–2009	→ Juventus (loan)	3	(0)
2012–2015	Rijeka	59	(0)
2014–2015	→ Rijeka II	8	(0)
Total		221	(3)

International career^{‡}
2006–2009	Croatia	13	(1)
- * Club domestic league appearances and goals as of 29 May 2015 ‡ National team caps and goals as of 11 April 2014

Dario Knežević (born 20 April 1982) is a former Croatian footballer who played as a defender. His fifteen-year career includes a six-year spell with Italian club Livorno and two separate spells with hometown club NK Rijeka. Knežević also represented the Croatia national football team at UEFA Euro 2008.

== Club career ==
Born in Rijeka, Knežević started his professional career with the city's First League side NK Rijeka in 2002 and subsequently made 115 appearances in the league before moving to Livorno on a three-year deal in late August 2006. He made his Serie A debut on 25 October 2006 in Livorno's 4–1 defeat to Internazionale and scored his first goal in the league against Cagliari on 18 April 2007 to secure his team a 2–1 victory.

On 30 June 2008, Juventus signed Knežević on a season-long loan deal worth €750,000, with the option to acquire half of the contractual rights at €1.6 million following Livorno's relegation to Serie B. On 5 October, Knežević made his first league appearance for the team. It was a 2–1 home loss to Palermo. He made just four appearances all season, three in the league and one in the UEFA Champions League in a 2–2 draw with FC BATE Borisov in Belarus.

On 15 June 2009, Knežević made his return to Livorno. He immediately became a mainstay in the side, but the team was relegated from the 2009–10 Serie A. The following season, Knežević made 31 appearances as Livorno finished ninth in the 2010–11 Serie B. In the 2011–12 Serie B season, Knežević again made 31 appearances in all competitions as the side narrowly avoided relegation. Knežević then decided to leave Livorno. He made 140 appearances for the Italian side in his two spells with the club.

Knežević return to his first professional club Rijeka in June 2012. He assumed the captaincy and led the club to a third-place finish in 2012–13, missing just two games all season. The following season, Knežević led Rijeka to the group stages of the 2013–14 UEFA Europa League, where they managed four points with four draws in the group stage but were still eliminated. He made 38 appearances in all competitions, a career high. In the 2014–15 season, Knežević made just two appearances, both towards the end of the season. Seeing he had little left to contribute at Rijeka, Knežević left the club in September 2015, terminating his contract by mutual consent. Knežević said he would rest until the winter and then make a decision about his future. He eventually retired from professional football.

== International career ==
Knežević has won 13 caps and scored one goal for the Croatia national team, making his debut as well as scoring his first international goal in a friendly match against Hong Kong on 1 February 2006. He was not called up for the 2006 FIFA World Cup. He was a regular part of Croatian team in qualifying matches for 2008 European Championship. Knežević came on as a substitute in two tournament matches, but in the third match which he started, he played 25 minutes before he had to be replaced because of an injury. His final international was a November 2009 friendly match against Liechtenstein.

== Career statistics ==
=== Club ===
Season	Club	League	League		Cup		Europe		Total	
Season	Club	League	Apps	Goals	Apps	Goals	Apps	Goals	Apps	Goals
2000–01	Orijent Rijeka	2. HNL	6	0	1	0	–		7	0
2001–02	Orijent Rijeka	2. HNL (South)	24	1	–		–		24	1
2002–03	Rijeka	1. HNL	7	0	–		–		7	0
2003–04	Rijeka	1. HNL	22	0	6	0	–		28	0
2004–05	Rijeka	1. HNL	26	0	8	2	1	0	35	2
2005–06	Rijeka	1. HNL	29	0	7	1	2	0	39^{1}	1
2006–07	Rijeka	1. HNL	5	0	–		2	0	8^{1}	0
2006–07	Livorno	Serie A	11	1	2	0	–		13	1
2007–08	Livorno	Serie A	35	3	1	0	–		36	3
2008–09	Juventus	Serie A	3	0	–		1	0	4	0
2009–10	Livorno	Serie A	27	0	2	0	–		29	0
2010–11	Livorno	Serie B	28	0	3	0	–		31	0
2011–12	Livorno	Serie B	29	0	2	0	–		31	0
2012–13	Rijeka	1. HNL	31	0	1	0	–		32	0
2013–14	Rijeka	1. HNL	26	0	4	0	8	0	38	0
2014–15	Rijeka	1. HNL	2	0	–		–		2	0
Career total			311	5	37	3	14	0	364	8
Last Update: 17 May 2015.^{1} Includes appearances in 2005 Croatian Supercup and 2006 Croatian Supercup.

=== International ===
Croatia national team
Year	Apps	Goals
2006	2	1
2007	2	0
2008	8	0
2009	1	0
Total	13	1

==== International goals ====
#	Date	Venue	Opponent	Score	Result	Competition
1.	1 February 2006	Hong Kong Stadium, Hong Kong, China	Hong Kong	1–0	4–0	Friendly match

== Honours ==
Rijeka

- Croatian Cup (3): 2005, 2006, 2014
