= Ivica Solomun =

Croatian footballer and manager

Personal information
- Date of birth: 29 January 1968 (age 58)
- Place of birth: Dvor, Croatia
- Position: Goalkeeper

Senior career*
Years	Team	Apps	(Gls)
1992–1993	Varteks	33	(0)
1993–1995	Belišće	50	(0)
1996–1998	Varteks	77	(0)
1999	Slaven Belupo	26	(0)
2000	Varteks	17	(1)
2000–2004	Slaven Belupo	101	(0)
Total		304	(1)

Managerial career
- 2010-2012: Al Faisaly (gk coach)
- 2012-: Varaždin
- 2014–2015: Zavrč
- 2015–2016: Zavrč
- 2017: Varaždin (gk coach)
- 2022: Međimurje
- * Club domestic league appearances and goals

Ivica Solomun (born 29 January 1968) is a retired Croatian football goalkeeper and manager. He is the most capped goalkeeper in the Croatian First Football League with 304 appearances.

He scored a goal for Varteks Varaždin from a penalty against HNK Vukovar '91 in February 2000.

== Managerial career ==
Solomun worked as an assistant to Zlatko Dalić at Al Faisaly, took charge of newly-founded Varaždin in 2012 and was named manager of NK Međimurje in June 2022, but was replaced by Zoran Ivančić three months later.

He also worked as a goalkeeper coach for Varaždin and the Croatia U-19 team. He also worked as manager of Slovenian side Zavrč on two occasions.

== Personal life ==
Solomun is married to Dorotea and they hava a daughter and a son together.
