= Peter Lérant =

Slovak footballer and manager

Personal information
- Date of birth: 30 November 1977 (age 48)
- Place of birth: Komárno, Czechoslovakia
- Height: 1.89 m (6 ft 2 in)
- Position: Centre-back

Senior career*
Years	Team	Apps	(Gls)
- KFC Komárno
1996–1998	DAC Dunajská Streda	53	(1)
1998–2000	Bayer Leverkusen II	44	(2)
2000	Lucerne	5	(0)
2001	Panionios	11	(0)
2001–2002	Austria Wien	13	(0)
2002	→ GAK (loan)	7	(0)
2002–2003	Újpest	5	(0)
2003–2004	Bad Bleiberg		
2004–2006	Rijeka	65	(3)
2007	Wisła Płock	12	(0)
2007–2008	Gorica	16	(0)
2009	Minyor Pernik	6	(0)
2009–2012	KFC Komárno		
2012–2013	Marcelová	24	(0)
2012	→ Družstevník Topoľníky (loan)		
2013–2015	Thermál Veľký Meder		

International career
1999–2000	Slovakia U21	11	(0)
2000	Slovakia Olympic	3	(0)
2000	Slovakia (unofficial)	3	(0)

Managerial career
- 2011: KFC Komárno
- 2013–2015: Thermál Veľký Meder
- 2016–2017: KFC Komárno
- 2017–2018: Nové Zámky
- 2018–2019: iClinic Sereď (assistant)
- 2020: iClinic Sereď
- 2021: Nitra
- 2022: Pohronie
- 2024–2025: Górnik Łęczna (assistant)
- 2025–2026: Žilina (assistant)
- * Club domestic league appearances and goals

Peter Lérant (born 30 January 1977) is a Slovak professional football manager and former player who played as a centre-back. He most recently served as the assistant manager of Žilina.

== Career ==
After playing two seasons with DAC 1904 Dunajská Streda in the Mars Superliga, he signed with Bayer 04 Leverkusen in 1998, but for the next two years he managed only to play for the reserves team. In the summer of 2000, he moved to Swiss club FC Lucerne, and after the winter break he continued in Greece with Panionios. In 2001, he signed with Austria Wien but in January 2002 he moved to GAK. From 2002 to 2003, he played for Hungarian side Újpest. In 2004, he moved to Croatia, signing with Prva HNL club HNK Rijeka where he would find stability and stay for almost three seasons. He played with Polish Ekstraklasa club Wisla Plock before coming to Slovenia in 2007 to play with Gorica. In 2009, he joined Bulgarian side Minyor Pernik.

== International career ==
From 1999 to 2000, Lerant made 11 appearances for the Slovakia under-21 team. In February 2000, he was part of the unofficial Slovak team in the Cyprus International Football Tournament where he played in all three games.

He represented the Slovakia at the 2000 Summer Olympics in Sydney. He played in the team which finished fourth at the 2000 UEFA European Under-21 Championship in Bratislava.

== Career statistics ==
Appearances and goals by club, season and competition
Club	Season	League			National cup (Note: Includes Austrian Cup, Croatian Cup, Polish Cup, Bulgarian Cup)		Europe		Total	
Club	Season	Division	Apps	Goals	Apps	Goals	Apps	Goals	Apps	Goals
Dunajská Streda	1996–97	Slovak Super Liga	29	0	—		—		29	0
Dunajská Streda	1997–98	Slovak Super Liga	24	1	—		—		24	1
Dunajská Streda	Total		53	1	0	0	0	0	53	1
Bayer 04 Leverkusen II	1998–99	Regionalliga West/Südwest	15	1	—		—		15	1
Bayer 04 Leverkusen II	1999–00	Regionalliga West/Südwest	28	1	—		—		28	1
Bayer 04 Leverkusen II	Total		43	2	0	0	0	0	43	2
Lucerne	2000–01	Nationalliga A	5	0	—		—		15	1
Panionios	2000–01	Alpha Ethniki	11	0	—		—		11	0
Austria Wien	2001–02	Austrian Bundesliga	13	0	2	0	—		15	0
Grazer AK	2001–02	Austrian Bundesliga	7	0	4	1	—		11	1
Újpest FC	2002–03	Nemzeti Bajnokság I	5	0	—		1 (Note: Appearance(s) in UEFA Cup)	0	6	0
BSV Bad Bleiberg	2003–04	Austrian 2. Bundesliga	—		—		—		0	0
HNK Rijeka	2004–05	1. HNL	30	3	6	1	2	0	38	4
HNK Rijeka	2005–06	1. HNL	20	0	6	0	1	0	27	0
HNK Rijeka	2006–07	1. HNL	15	0	4	0	2	0	21	0
HNK Rijeka	Total		65	3	16	1	5	0	86	4
Wisła Płock	2006–07	Ekstraklasa	12	0	3	0	—		15	0
ND Gorica	2007–08	Slovenian PrvaLiga	16	0	—		2	0	18	0
Minyor Pernik	2008–09	A Group	6	0	2	0	—		8	0
Career total			236	6	27	2	8	0	271	8

== Honours ==
GAK Graz

- Austrian Cup: 2001–02

HNK Rijeka

- Croatian Cup: 2004–05, 2005–06

== External sources ==
- Peter Lérant at 90minut.pl (in Polish)
- Stats from Croatia at HRrepka. (in Croatian)
- Peter Lérant at Olympedia
- Peter Lérant at Olympics.com
- Peter Lérant at Olympic.sk (in Slovak)
