= Srebrenko Posavec =

Croatian football midfielder (born 1980)

Personal information
- Full name: Srebrenko Posavec
- Date of birth: 19 March 1980 (age 46)
- Place of birth: Murska Sobota, SR Slovenia, SFR Yugoslavia
- Height: 1.81 m (5 ft 11 1/2 in)
- Position: Midfielder

Senior career*
Years	Team	Apps	(Gls)
1999–2000	Varteks	0	(0)
1999–2000	Hannover 96	5	(0)
2000–2005	Slaven Belupo	95	(23)
2005–2006	Varteks	28	(2)
2006–2007	Ankaragücü	7	(0)
2006–2010	Slaven Belupo	91	(16)
2010–2011	Varteks	4	(0)
2011–2012	Koper	16	(0)
2013	Hunan Billows	24	(2)
2014-2015	SV Mischendorf/Neuhaus	12	(4)
2015	ASK Rotenturm	14	(3)
2016-2019	SV Union Sturm Klöch	70	(21)

International career^{‡}
2006	Croatia	1	(0)
- * Club domestic league appearances and goals as of 25 November 2022 ‡ National team caps and goals as of 3 March 2013

Srebrenko Posavec (Croatian pronunciation: [pôsaʋets]; born 19 March 1980) is a Croatian retired football midfielder.

== Club career ==
He finished his career in the Austrian lower leagues.

== International career ==
He made his international debut against Hong Kong in a 4–0 win in Hong Kong's 2006 Lunar New Year Cup on 1 February 2006. This is his only appearance for the Croatia national football team.
