= Nikola Melnjak =

Croatian footballer

Personal information
- Full name: Nikola Melnjak
- Date of birth: 6 September 1981 (age 45)
- Place of birth: Varaždin, SFR Yugoslavia
- Height: 1.80 m (5 ft 11 in)
- Position: Left back

Team information
- Current team: Rohrbrunn
- Number: 10

Youth career
- Varteks

Senior career*
Years	Team	Apps	(Gls)
2003–2009	Varteks	123	(3)
2009–2010	Međimurje	23	(0)
2010	Spartak Trnava	2	(0)
2011	ASK Baumgarten	14	(0)
2012–2016	SV Markt Sankt Martin	108	(7)
2016-2019	Unterpullendorf	73	(18)
2019-2021	Plitvica		
2022-	Rohrbrunn	12	(0)
- * Club domestic league appearances and goals as of 27 October 2022

Nikola Melnjak (born 6 September 1981) is a Croatian football defender, who pays for Austrian amateur side SV Rohrbrunn.

== Career ==
He came to Spartak Trnava in the summer 2010. He later had an extensive spell in Austria, with several lower league sides.
