= Dušan Kerkez =

Bosnian footballer (born 1976)

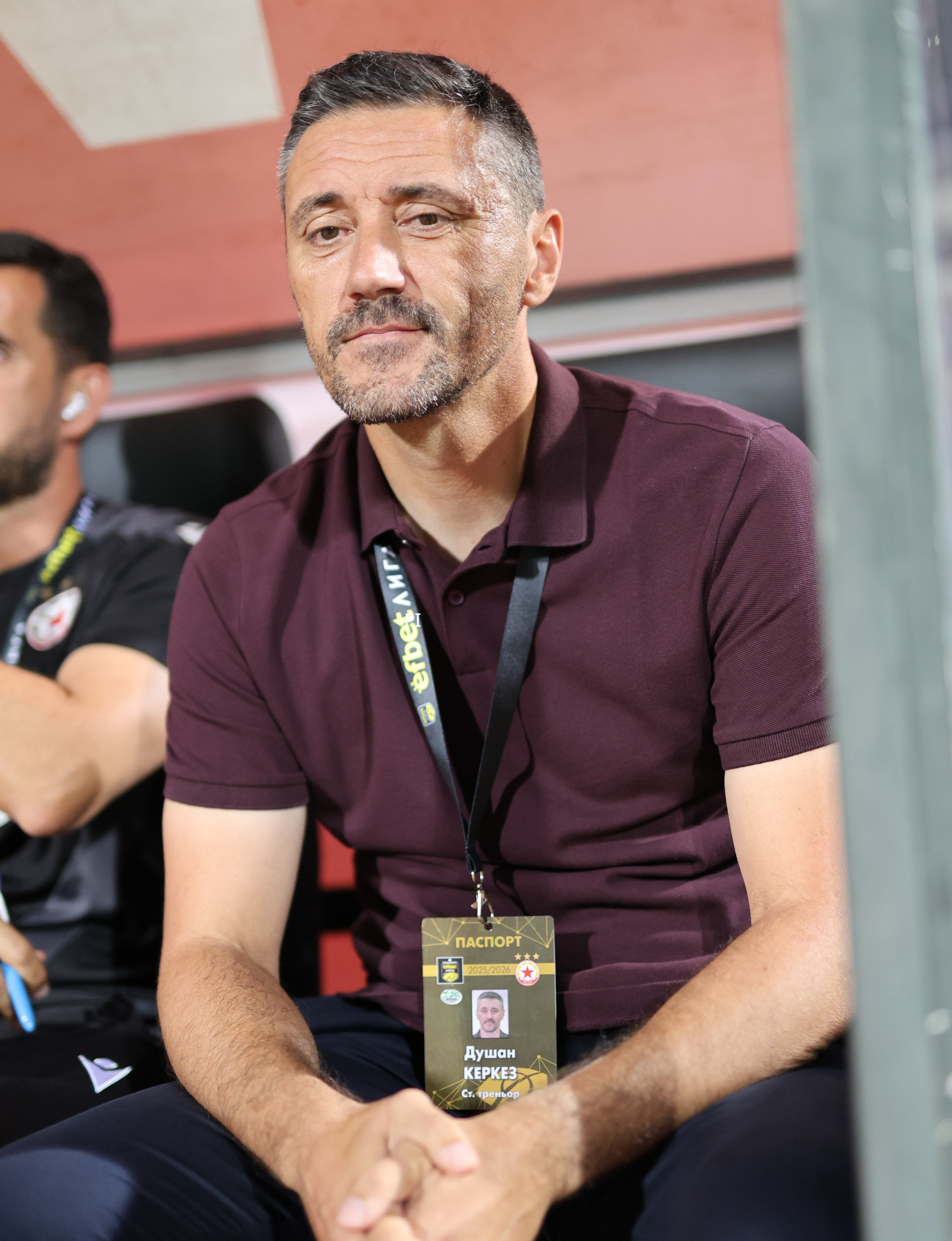

Personal information
- Date of birth: 1 May 1976 (age 50)
- Place of birth: Belgrade, SR Serbia, Yugoslavia
- Height: 1.82 m (6 ft 0 in)
- Position: Midfielder

Team information
- Current team: Atromitos (manager)

Youth career
- Partizan

Senior career*
Years	Team	Apps	(Gls)
199ɂ–199ɂ	Voždovac		
2001–2002	Radnički Obrenovac	26	(1)
2002–2004	Leotar	63	(9)
2004–2005	Zrinjski Mostar	27	(3)
2005–2007	Rijeka	41	(1)
2007–2011	AEL Limassol	93	(5)
2011–2014	Aris Limassol	82	(2)
Total		332	(21)

International career
2004–2006	Bosnia and Herzegovina	4	(0)

Managerial career
- 2014–2018: AEL Limassol (youth)
- 2018–2021: AEL Limassol
- 2022–2023: Čukarički
- 2023–2025: Botev Plovdiv
- 2025: CSKA Sofia
- 2025–2026: Atromitos
- 2026: Anorthosis Famagusta
- * Club domestic league appearances and goals

Dušan Kerkez (Serbian Cyrillic: Душан Керкез; born 1 May 1976) is a Bosnian professional football manager, who is the head coach of Super League Greece side Atromitos and former player who played as a midfielder.

== Playing career ==
=== Club ===
In the 2001–02 season, Kerkez played regularly for Radnički Obrenovac and helped the club earn promotion to the First League of FR Yugoslavia for the first time in history. He then moved to Bosnia and Herzegovina and joined Leotar in the summer of 2002, helping them win the national championship in their debut appearance in the top flight.

After two years at Leotar, Kerkez switched to fellow Bosnian side Zrinjski Mostar in the summer of 2004, celebrating his second league title in his only season at the club. He subsequently moved to Croatia and signed with Rijeka, winning the national cup in his first year.

In the summer of 2007, Kerkez was transferred to Cypriot side AEL Limassol. He spent four seasons with the club, before switching to cross-town rivals Aris Limassol in the summer of 2011.

=== International ===
Kerkez received his first call-up to the Bosnia and Herzegovina squad by manager Blaž Slišković and made his debut for them in a February 2004 friendly match away against FYR Macedonia. He has earned a total of four. He also played in an unofficial game against Iran in 2005. His final international was a September 2006 European Championship qualification against Hungary.

== Personal life ==
Kerkez's son Strahinja Kerkez is also a professional footballer, and is a youth international for Cyprus.

== Managerial statistics ==
As of 22 November 2026

Managerial record by team and tenure
Team	From	To	Record							
Team	From	To	G	W	D	L	Win %	GF	GA	GD
AEL Limassol	6 March 2018	6 December 2021	128	59	24	45	46.09	179	152	27
Čukarički	31 May 2022	15 August 2023	49	31	7	11	63.27	88	51	37
Botev Plovdiv	4 September 2023	1 June 2025	78	36	16	26	46.15	114	93	21
CSKA Sofia	6 June 2025	20 September 2025	8	1	4	3	12.50	7	8	-1
Atromitos	15 November 2025	Present	42	15	12	15	35.71	57	47	10
Career total			305	142	63	100	46.56	446	350	96

== Honours ==
=== Player ===
Leotar

- Bosnian Premier League: 2002–03

Zrinjski Mostar

- Bosnian Premier League: 2004–05

Rijeka

- Croatian Cup: 2005–06

=== Manager ===
AEL Limassol

- Cypriot Cup: 2018–19

Čukarički

- Serbian Cup runner-up: 2022–23

Botev Plovdiv

- Bulgarian Cup: 2023–24

Individual

- Serbian SuperLiga Manager of the Month: September 2022
