= Mario Prišć =

Croatian footballer

Personal information
- Full name: Mario Prišć
- Date of birth: 18 February 1974 (age 52)
- Place of birth: Našice, Croatia
- Position: Midfielder

Youth career
- NAŠK

Senior career*
Years	Team	Apps	(Gls)
1998–2001	Osijek	75	(7)
2001–2004	Rapid Wien	87	(2)
2004–2007	Rijeka	69	(2)
2007–2010	NAŠK	153	(32)
2010–2013	FEŠK		
- * Club domestic league appearances and goals

Mario Prišć (born 18 February 1974) is a retired Croatian football midfielder.

== Career ==
He began his career in NK NAŠK, and he also played in NK Croatia Đakovo before he moved to NK Osijek in 1998. He played there for three excellent seasons. In NK Osijek he got a very good reputation and as a result, he got transferred to Rapid Wien in 2001. He joined NK Rijeka in 2004 and he spent there three seasons. In December 2007. he was released on a free transfer and then he rejoined his home club NK NAŠK where he began his football career. Later he moved to NK FEŠK where he finished his football career.

== Honours ==
Osijek

- Croatian Football Cup (1): 1999

Rijeka

- Prva HNL runner-up (1): 2005-06
- Croatian Football Cup (2): 2005, 2006
- Croatian Football Super Cup runner-up (2): 2005, 2006
