= Leon Benko =

Croatian footballer (born 1983)

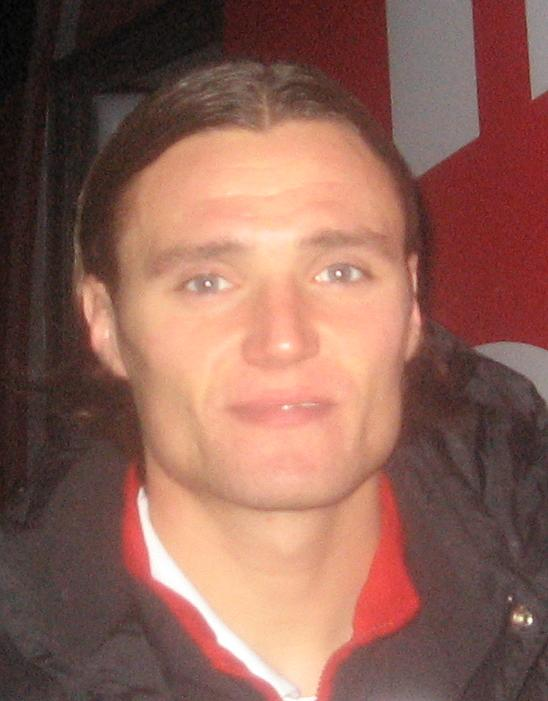
- Benko in 2007

Personal information
- Date of birth: 11 November 1983 (age 43)
- Place of birth: Varaždin, SR Croatia, Yugoslavia
- Height: 1.82 m (5 ft 11 1/2 in)
- Position: Forward

Youth career
- 1991–2003: Varteks

Senior career*
Years	Team	Apps	(Gls)
2003–2006	Varteks	68	(18)
2006–2008	1. FC Nürnberg	10	(0)
2008–2009	Standard Liège	14	(1)
2009–2010	Kortrijk	32	(5)
2011–2012	Slaven Belupo	27	(15)
2012	Al-Faisaly	9	(5)
2012–2014	Rijeka	50	(34)
2014	Dalian Aerbin	9	(1)
2014–2016	Sarajevo	41	(27)
2016–2018	Olimpija Ljubljana	49	(13)
2018–2021	Varaždin	81	(28)
2021–2023	Varteks	17	(7)
Total		405	(154)

International career
2003	Croatia U20	2	(0)
2004–2005	Croatia U21	17	(0)
2006–2013	Croatia	4	(0)
- * Club domestic league appearances and goals

Leon Benko (Croatian pronunciation: [lêon běːŋko]; born 11 November 1983) is a Croatian former professional footballer who played as a forward.

A product of NK Varteks youth academy, Benko had spells abroad in the German Bundesliga with 1. FC Nürnberg and in Belgium with Standard Liège and K.V. Kortrijk. He was the 2012–13 Prva HNL league's top scorer.

== Club career ==
=== Varteks ===
Benko signed his first professional contract with his youth club, NK Varteks, in July 2003, and continued to play for the club in the following three seasons under coaches Miroslav Blažević (2003–05) and Zlatko Dalić (2005–06). In his second season at Varteks he established himself as one of the club's key players, appearing in 26 matches in the Croatian First League.

In the summer of 2005, he also performed well for Varteks in the UEFA Intertoto Cup, scoring all four goals in their 4–1 victory over Dinamo Tirana as well as a brace that included the winning goal in a 4–3 victory over Inter Turku. He finished the 2005–06 season as the club's top scorer, scoring 14 goals in 27 league appearances, and was instrumental in the club's 2005–06 Croatian Cup campaign in which they reached the final before losing to Rijeka on away goals rule. His excellent performances at Varteks earned him the 2005 Hope of the Year award for Croatia's best young player.

=== Nürnberg ===
On 23 May 2006, it was announced that Benko has signed for German Bundesliga side 1. FC Nürnberg on a three-year contract with an optional one-year extension. He made his Bundesliga debut on 12 August 2006, playing as a substitute in the last five minutes of the club's first league match of the 2006–07 season, a 3–0 away victory at VfB Stuttgart. He finished his first Bundesliga season with only seven appearances, having missed the entire second part of the season due to injury problems.

He scored his first goal for Nürnberg on 29 November 2007 in their UEFA Cup group match against eventual winners of the competition, Zenit Saint Petersburg, securing his team a 2–2 away draw. He made a total of four appearances for Nürnberg in the 2007–08 season of the UEFA Cup.

=== Standard Liège ===
On 4 August 2008, Benko moved to Belgian side Standard Liège for an undisclosed fee, signing a one-year contract with an optional extension. He made his debut for the club on 16 August 2008 in their 3–1 away win at FCV Dender in the first round of the 2008–09 Jupiler League, coming on as a late substitute. In his only season with the club he made only 14 league appearances due to his injury problems. He managed to win the Belgian First Division title with the club.

=== K.V. Kortrijk ===
On 30 June 2009, K.V. Kortrijk signed the Croatian forward from Standard Liège until June 2010.

=== Slaven Belupo ===
On 29 January 2011, Benko signed a one-and-a-half-year contract with Slaven Belupo. In his first game for Slaven, he scored a goal in a 2–1 loss against RNK Split. By the end of the season he made ten more appearances for the club and scored eight goals in the process. He opened the new season by scoring a goal against NK Zagreb on matchday 1 in July 2011. He scored seven goals in Croatian First League and added three assists by the end of the mid-season when he was transferred to Saudi Professional League club Al-Faisaly.

=== Rijeka ===
In June 2012, it was announced that Benko will be joining HNK Rijeka. He was given the number 19 shirt.

Benko made his debut for the new club against NK Zadar at the end of the July, and scored his first goal on Matchday 4 of the season against Lokomotiva Zagreb. In his first season with the club he fulfilled the expectations of the club officials and the fans as he was the 2012–13 Prva HNL league's top scorer with 18 goals in 30 appearances. At the end of the season, he was awarded with SN Yellow Shirt award, as the best football player in the 2012–13 Prva HNL, based on post-match ratings awarded by sports journalists over the course of a season. The club finished third in the 2012–13 Prva HNL standings and secured their spot in the Europa League qualifications.

Benko started the new 2013–14 season in strong fashion, netting 11 goals in first 11 appearances. He scored five goals in the 2013–14 UEFA Europa League qualifying phase, including two goals against VfB Stuttgart in Europa League play-off round. His goals helped Rijeka to reach their first ever Europa League group stage where they were drawn in Group I together with Olympique Lyonnais, Real Betis and Vitória S.C.. On 28 September, he scored a spectacular volley against Rijeka's greatest rivals Hajduk Split in Adriatic derby. A month later, on Matchday 2 of the 2013–14 Europa League, Benko scored another volley goal against Real Betis to give his team 1–0 lead on Stadion Kantrida. The match eventually finished 1–1.

=== Dalian Aerbin ===
On 24 February 2014, Benko reportedly signed for Chinese Super League team Dalian Aerbin for an undisclosed fee.

On 28 April 2015, Benko filed a lawsuit at the Hong Kong High Court against the holding company of Dalian Aerbin for unpaid wages and image rights. Benko claimed that his contract with Dalian was worth 1.02 million euros. However, four months into his contract, he was paid only 36,000 euros. He has terminated his contract with Dalian since then.

=== Sarajevo ===
On 12 September 2014, Benko signed for Bosnian Premier League club Sarajevo as a free agent.

During the first half of the 2014–15 Premier League, he scored 9 goals in 14 appearances. In the next season, Sarajevo was ranked fourth in the league and Benko was the league top scorer with 18 goals. At the beginning of the 2016–17 season Benko got suspended for drinking alcohol before a match against rival club Zrinjski.

=== Olimpija Ljubljana ===
After falling out with Sarajevo over his suspension, Benko signed a two-year contract with Slovenian PrvaLiga club Olimpija Ljubljana on a free transfer on 30 August 2016.

During the mid-season, on 15 December 2016, the club announced that Benko would be departing from the club due to poor performances. In the end, Benko stayed at the club, scoring 14 goals in 34 appearances for the club in all competitions. He also appeared in the final of the 2017 Slovenian Football Cup, where Olimpija lost 1–0 to Domžale.

=== Varaždin ===
On 20 August 2018, Benko signed for the Croatian second-tier club Varaždin. On 18 May 2019, he scored two goals in Varaždin's 3–1 home win against Šibenik, which secured his team a promotion to the Prva HNL.

== International career ==
Benko has been capped for the Croatian national under-21 team and he subsequently went on to make his debut for the country's A-team by appearing in both of their two matches at the 2006 Carlsberg Cup in Hong Kong.

Benko was once again included in the roster for the friendly match against South Korea on 10 September 2013. He provided a crucial assist for Domagoj Vida who scored the first goal in 65th minute of the match. Croatia went on to win the match, being their second match and second win against South Korea side in the year of 2013 alone. His prolific goalscoring form in his club earned him another call-up, this time for the Croatia crucial 2014 World Cup play-off matches against Iceland on 15 November 2013.

== Career statistics ==
=== Club ===
Appearances and goals by club, season and competition
Club	Season	League			Cup		Continental		Total	
Club	Season	Division	Apps	Goals	Apps	Goals	Apps	Goals	Apps	Goals
Varteks	2003–04	Croatian First League	15	3	6	2	—		21	5
Varteks	2004–05	Croatian First League	26	1	6	2	—		32	3
Varteks	2005–06	Croatian First League	27	14	8	9	5	6	40	29
Varteks	Total		68	18	20	13	5	6	93	37
1. FC Nürnberg	2006–07	Bundesliga	7	0	2	0	—		9	0
1. FC Nürnberg	2007–08	Bundesliga	3	0	0	0	4	1	7	1
1. FC Nürnberg	Total		10	0	2	0	4	1	16	1
Standard Liège	2008–09	Belgian Pro League	14	1	1	0	1	0	16	1
Kortrijk	2009–10	Belgian Pro League	26	5	1	0	—		27	5
Kortrijk	2010–11	Belgian Pro League	6	0	—		—		6	0
Kortrijk	Total		32	5	1	0	—		33	5
Slaven Belupo	2010–11	Croatian First League	11	8	2	1	—		13	9
Slaven Belupo	2011–12	Croatian First League	16	7	2	1	—		18	8
Slaven Belupo	Total		27	15	4	2	—		31	17
Al-Faisaly	2011–12	Saudi Professional League	9	5	3	1	—		12	6
Rijeka	2012–13	Croatian First League	30	18	1	0	—		31	18
Rijeka	2013–14	Croatian First League	20	16	2	2	11	6	33	24
Rijeka	Total		50	34	3	2	11	6	64	42
Dalian Aerbin	2014	Chinese Super League	9	1	—		—		9	1
Sarajevo	2014–15	Bosnian Premier League	14	9	2	0	—		16	9
Sarajevo	2015–16	Bosnian Premier League	26	18	4	2	2	0	32	20
Sarajevo	2016–17	Bosnian Premier League	1	0	—		—		1	0
Sarajevo	Total		41	27	6	2	2	0	49	29
Olimpija	2016–17	Slovenian PrvaLiga	29	10	5	4	—		34	14
Olimpija	2017–18	Slovenian PrvaLiga	20	3	5	5	2	0	27	8
Olimpija	Total		49	13	10	9	2	0	61	22
Varaždin	2018–19	Croatian Second League	23	21	1	1	—		24	22
Varaždin	2019–20	Croatian First League	27	5	0	0	—		27	5
Varaždin	2020–21	Croatian First League	29	2	1	0	—		30	2
Varaždin	Total		79	28	2	1	—		81	29
Career total			388	147	52	30	25	13	465	190

=== International ===
National team	Year	Apps	Goals
Croatia
Croatia	2006	2	0
Croatia	2007	0	0
Croatia	2008	0	0
Croatia	2009	0	0
Croatia	2010	0	0
Croatia	2011	0	0
Croatia	2012	0	0
Croatia	2013	2	0
Total		4	0

== Honours ==
Nürnberg

- DFB-Pokal: 2006–07

Standard Liège

- Belgian Pro League: 2008–09

Sarajevo

- Bosnian Premier League: 2014–15

Olimpija Ljubljana

- Slovenian PrvaLiga: 2017–18
- Slovenian Cup: 2017–18

Varaždin

- 2. HNL: 2018–19

Individual

- Croatian Football Hope of the Year: 2005
- SN Yellow Shirt Award: 2013
- Football Oscar Team of the Year: 2013
- HNL's Football Player of the Year: 2013
- Croatian Cup top scorer: 2005–06
- Croatian First League top scorer: 2012–13
- Bosnian Premier League top scorer: 2015–16
- Slovenian Cup top scorer: 2016–17, 2017–18
- Croatian Second League top scorer: 2018–19
