= Zoran Ivančić =

Croatian footballer

Personal information
- Date of birth: 16 September 1975 (age 51)
- Place of birth: Sveti Đurđ, SFR Yugoslavia
- Height: 1.84 m (6 ft 0 in)
- Position: Defender

Youth career
- Varteks

Senior career*
Years	Team	Apps	(Gls)
1993–1998	Varteks	13	(0)
1998–2000	Kärnten	38	(0)
2000–2001	Kapfenberger SV		
2001–2002	Varteks	9	(0)
2002–2003	Pomorac	24	(2)
2003–2004	Dravograd	15	(0)
2004–2006	Rijeka	31	(3)
2006–2011	Varteks Varaždin	48	(2)
2011	St. Johann/Saggautal	12	(1)
2012	Gerečja Vas		
2012	Čakovec	4	(0)
2013	Mladost Prelog	14	(2)

Managerial career
- Sloboda Varaždin
- Zelengaj Donji Kućan
- Plavi Peklenica
- 2022: Međimurje
- * Club domestic league appearances and goals as of 13:51, 7 March 2014 (UTC)

Zoran Ivančić (born 16 September 1975) is a Croatian retired football defender who last played for Mladost Prelog in Croatia's Treća HNL.

== Club career ==
During his professional career he mainly played for NK Varteks (renamed NK Varaždin in mid-2010) in Croatia's Prva HNL, with two stints in Austria and Slovenia.

== Managerial career ==
He resigned as manager of Međimurje in September 2022 for personal reasons. He had only been in charge for three weeks after succeeding Ivica Solomun in the hot seat.
