= Igor Tkalčević =

Croatian footballer

Personal information
- Date of birth: 26 November 1974 (age 51)
- Place of birth: Vinkovci, Croatia
- Height: 1.88 m (6 ft 2 in)
- Position: Defender

Team information
- Current team: Krk (manager)

Youth career
- Cibalia

Senior career*
| Years | Team | Apps | (Gls) |
| 1993–1994 | Osijek | 3 | (0) |
| 1994–1998 | Slavonija | | |
| 1998–2002 | Cibalia | 87 | (7) |
| 2002–2004 | Osijek | 34 | (0) |
| 2004–2007 | Rijeka | 60 | (3) |
| 2007 | Beijing Hongdeng | 17 | (0) |
| 2007 | Međimurje | 2 | (0) |
| 2008 | Chengdu Tiancheng | 1 | (0) |
| 2008–2014 | Opatija | | |
| 2014–2015 | Draga | | |

Managerial career
- Al-Mesaimeer (assistant coach)
- 2021–2022: Al-Ittihad
- 2022–: Krk
- * Club domestic league appearances and goals as of 13:51, 7 March 2014 (UTC)

Igor Tkalčević (born 26 November 1974) is a retired Croatian football defender. His professional career spanned over two decades. During this time he mainly played for clubs in Croatia's Prva HNL, with two stints in China.

He was appointed manager of Krk in June 2022.

== Honours ==
Rijeka

- Croatian Cup: 2005, 2006
