= Mario Lučić =

Croatian footballer

Personal information
- Date of birth: 24 April 1981 (age 45)
- Place of birth: Vinkovci, Croatia
- Height: 1.80 m (5 ft 11 in)
- Position: Defender

Senior career*
Years	Team	Apps	(Gls)
2000–2004	Cibalia		
2004–2005	Dinamo Zagreb	28	(1)
2006	Varteks	12	(0)
2006	Bnei Yehuda Tel Aviv	0	(0)
2006–2009	Varteks	68	(5)
2009–2012	Cibalia	80	(2)
2013–2014	Lučko	29	(1)

International career
- Croatia U21
- * Club domestic league appearances and goals

Mario Lučić (born 24 April 1981) is a retired Croatian football defender. He was a squad member for the 2004 UEFA European Under-21 Championship.
