= NK Jedinstvo Omladinac =

Croatian football club

Jedinstvo Omladinac
- Full name: Nogometni klub Jedinstvo Omladinac
- Founded: 2003
- Ground: Igralište u Nedešćini
- Capacity: 1,000
- Manager: Loris Černjul
- League: 3. HNL – West
Home colours

NK Jedinstvo Omladinac is a Croatian football club based in the village of Nedešćina.

== History ==
The club was founded in 2003 after the merger between NK Jedinstvo from Nedešćina (which was founded in 1950) and NK Omladinac from Sveti Martin (which was founded in 1960).

For some time club carried the name NK Jedinstvo Omladinac Kapra.
