= 2005–06 Croatian First Football League =

Prva HNL Ožujsko
- Season: 2005–06
- Champions: Dinamo Zagreb; 8th Croatian title 12th domestic title
- Runner up: Rijeka
- Relegated: Inter Zaprešić
- Champions League: Dinamo Zagreb
- UEFA Cup: Rijeka; Varteks (via Cup)
- Intertoto Cup: Osijek
- Matches: 192
- Goals: 513 (2.67 per match)
- Top goalscorer: Ivan Bošnjak (22)
- Biggest home win: Hajduk S. 6–0 Osijek
- Biggest away win: Inter Z. 0–6 Dinamo Z.
- Highest scoring: 6–0 two matches 5–1 three matches
- Average attendance: 3,349

The 2005–06 Croatian First Football League (also known as 1. HNL; officially styled as Prva HNL Ožujsko for sponsorship reasons) was the fifteenth season of the Croatian First Football League, the national championship for men's association football teams in Croatia, since its establishment in 1992. The season started on 20 July 2005 and ended on 13 May 2006. Hajduk Split were the defending champions, having won their eighteenth championship title the previous season. Dinamo Zagreb won the title, after a win against Osijek on 6 May 2006, which started his eleventh year dominance.

== Teams ==
=== Stadia and personnel ===
Locations of teams in 2005–06 Prva HNL

Team	Manager^{1}	Location	Stadium	Capacity
Cibalia	(Croatia) Goran Meštrović	Vinkovci	Stadion HNK Cibalia	10,000
Dinamo Zagreb	(Croatia) Josip Kuže	Zagreb	Stadion Maksimir	37,168
Hajduk Split	(Croatia) Luka Bonačić	Split	Stadion Poljud	35,000
Inter Zaprešić	(Croatia) Đuro Bago	Šibenik	Stadion ŠRC Zaprešić	5,000
Kamen Ingrad	(Croatia) Ivica Matković	Velika	Stadion Kamen Ingrad	8,000
Međimurje	(Croatia) Stanko Mršić	Čakovec	Stadion SRC Mladost	8,000
Osijek	(Croatia) Ivo Šušak	Osijek	Stadion Gradski vrt	19,500
Pula Staro Češko	(Croatia) Krunoslav Jurčić	Pula	Stadion Veruda	3,000
Rijeka	(Croatia) Dragan Skočić	Rijeka	Stadion Kantrida	10,275
Slaven Belupo	(Croatia) Elvis Scoria	Koprivnica	Gradski stadion u Koprivnici	4,000
Varteks	(Croatia) Zlatko Dalić	Varaždin	Stadion Varteks	10,800
NK Zagreb	(Slovenia) Miloš Rus	Zagreb	Stadion Kranjčevićeva	8,850

- ^{1} On final match day of the season, played on 13 May 2006.

== First stage ==
Pos	Team	Pld	W	D	L	GF	GA	GD	Pts	Qualification
1	Dinamo Zagreb	22	18	2	2	61	11	+50	56	Qualification to championship group
2	Rijeka	22	14	3	5	42	28	+14	45	Qualification to championship group
3	Osijek	22	10	4	8	25	32	−7	34	Qualification to championship group
4	Varteks	22	10	1	11	34	35	−1	31	Qualification to championship group
5	Hajduk Split	22	7	8	7	28	21	+7	29	Qualification to championship group
6	Kamen Ingrad	22	8	5	9	26	30	−4	29	Qualification to championship group
7	Pula Staro Češko	22	8	4	10	29	26	+3	28	Qualification to relegation group
8	NK Zagreb	22	8	3	11	19	27	−8	27	Qualification to relegation group
9	Cibalia	22	7	5	10	24	35	−11	26	Qualification to relegation group
10	Slaven Belupo	22	5	7	10	29	38	−9	22	Qualification to relegation group
11	Inter Zaprešić	22	6	4	12	17	34	−17	22	Qualification to relegation group
12	Međimurje	22	5	6	11	26	43	−17	21	Qualification to relegation group

Source: RSSSF.org
Rules for classification: 1st points; 2nd head-to-head points; 3rd head-to-head goal difference; 4th head-to-head away goals scored

=== Rounds 1–22 results ===
Home \ Away	DIN	RIJ	VAR	OSI	HAJ	KAM	PUL	SLA	CIB	ZAG	MEĐ	INT
Dinamo Zagreb		5–1	1–0	3–1	0–0	5–0	1–0	4–1	1–0	4–1	3–0	0–0
Rijeka	0–1		3–1	4–1	1–0	3–1	2–2	4–2	4–1	0–0	4–1	0–0
Varteks	2–5	1–4		0–1	0–1	1–3	2–0	2–2	4–0	3–1	3–2	2–0
Osijek	1–0	0–1	2–0		1–1	1–0	1–0	4–2	1–1	1–0	1–1	1–0
Hajduk Split	0–1	0–1	3–0	6–0		1–2	1–1	1–1	1–1	3–1	1–0	3–2
Kamen Ingrad	1–5	0–1	0–1	2–0	2–1		2–1	0–0	2–0	1–2	2–2	0–1
Pula Staro Češko	2–1	3–0	0–2	2–2	2–0	1–2		1–0	2–3	2–0	4–0	3–0
Slaven Belupo	0–2	1–3	4–3	3–1	0–0	1–1	1–1		4–2	1–0	1–1	3–0
Cibalia	0–4	4–0	1–0	3–1	1–0	1–1	0–2	1–0		1–1	0–2	1–0
NK Zagreb	0–4	2–0	0–1	0–1	1–2	2–1	2–0	3–1	1–0		1–0	1–0
Međimurje	1–5	2–4	1–4	1–0	1–1	0–3	2–0	2–0	3–3	0–0		1–2
Inter Zaprešić	0–6	0–2	1–2	2–3	2–2	0–0	2–0	2–1	1–0	1–0	1–3	

Source: RSSSF.org
Legend: Blue = home team win; Yellow = draw; Red = away team win.

== Championship group ==
Pos	Team	Pld	W	D	L	GF	GA	GD	Pts	Qualification
1	Dinamo Zagreb (C)	32	24	4	4	78	21	+57	76	Qualification to Champions League second qualifying round
2	Rijeka	32	20	5	7	61	36	+25	65	Qualification to UEFA Cup first qualifying round
3	Varteks	32	15	2	15	51	48	+3	47	Qualification to UEFA Cup first qualifying round
4	Osijek	32	13	5	14	31	48	−17	44	Qualification to Intertoto Cup second round
5	Hajduk Split	32	10	10	12	40	35	+5	40	
6	Kamen Ingrad	32	11	5	16	33	47	−14	38	

Source: RSSSF.org
Rules for classification: 1st points; 2nd head-to-head points; 3rd head-to-head goal difference; 4th head-to-head away goals scored
(C) Champions

=== Rounds 23–32 results ===
Home \ Away	DIN	HAJ	KAM	OSI	RIJ	VAR
Dinamo Zagreb		1–0	2–0	1–0	1–2	2–1
Hajduk Split	1–0		4–1	3–0	0–4	2–2
Kamen Ingrad	1–3	1–0		1–2	1–0	0–1
Osijek	0–0	2–1	1–0		0–2	0–2
Rijeka	2–2	1–1	3–0	3–1		2–1
Varteks	3–5	2–0	1–2	3–0	1–0	

Source: RSSSF.org
Legend: Blue = home team win; Yellow = draw; Red = away team win.

== Relegation group ==
Pos	Team	Pld	W	D	L	GF	GA	GD	Pts	Relegation
7	Pula Staro Češko	32	13	6	13	44	36	+8	45	
8	Slaven Belupo	32	10	11	11	46	48	−2	41	
9	Cibalia	32	9	10	13	33	47	−14	37	
10	NK Zagreb	32	11	4	17	26	43	−17	37	
11	Međimurje (O)	32	9	9	14	40	51	−11	36	Qualification to relegation play-off
12	Inter Zaprešić (R)	32	8	7	17	30	53	−23	31	Relegation to Croatian Second Football League

Source: RSSSF.org
Rules for classification: 1st points; 2nd head-to-head points; 3rd head-to-head goal difference; 4th head-to-head away goals scored
(O) Play-off winners; (R) Relegated

=== Rounds 23–32 results ===
Home \ Away	CIB	INT	MEĐ	PUL	SLA	ZAG
Cibalia		1–1	0–0	0–0	1–1	2–1
Inter Zaprešić	4–3		0–1	1–4	1–2	1–0
Međimurje	4–0	2–2		2–0	3–4	2–0
Pula Staro Češko	0–2	2–1	1–0		2–0	4–1
Slaven Belupo	1–0	1–1	0–0	2–2		3–0
NK Zagreb	0–0	3–1	1–0	1–0	0–3	

Source: RSSSF.org
Legend: Blue = home team win; Yellow = draw; Red = away team win.

=== Relegation play-off ===
Playoff wasn't needed after the second-placed Croatian Second Football League team, Belišće, failed to secure a license to compete in Prva HNL. Therefore, Međimurje automatically kept their first-league status for the 2006–07 season.

== Top goalscorers ==
Rank	Player	Club	Goals
1	(Croatia) Ivan Bošnjak	Dinamo Zagreb	22
2	(Croatia) Eduardo da Silva	Dinamo Zagreb	21
3	(Croatia) Davor Vugrinec	Rijeka	15
4	(Croatia) Leon Benko	Varteks	14
4	(Croatia) Ahmad Sharbini	Rijeka	14
6	(Croatia) Srđan Lakić	Kamen Ingrad	13
7	(Croatia) Igor Mostarlić	Međimurje	12
8	(Bosnia and Herzegovina) Ivan Jolić	Varteks	11
8	(Croatia) Stiven Rivić	Pula Staro Češko	11
10.	(Croatia) Niko Kranjčar	Hajduk Split	10
10.	(Croatia) Dino Kresinger	Međimurje	10

== Attendances ==
#	Club	Average
1	Dinamo Zagreb	11,156
2	Hajduk	5,194
3	Rijeka	4,188
4	Varteks	2,988
5	Osijek	2,644
6	Cibalia	1,756
7	Zaprešić	1,738
8	Zagreb	1,613
9	Pula	1,513
10	Kamen	1,469
11	Slaven	1,450
12	Međimurje	1,300

== See also ==
- 2005–06 Croatian Second Football League
- 2005–06 Croatian Football Cup
