= Daniel Šarić =

Croatian footballer

Personal information
- Date of birth: 4 August 1972 (age 54)
- Place of birth: Rijeka, SFR Yugoslavia
- Height: 1.78 m (5 ft 10 in)
- Position: Right wing back

Youth career
- Rijeka

Senior career*
Years	Team	Apps	(Gls)
1989–1993	Rijeka	53	(8)
1993–1995	Sporting Gijón	33	(3)
1995–2000	Dinamo Zagreb	102	(9)
2000–2003	Panathinaikos	43	(1)
2003–2007	Rijeka	96	(1)
Total		327	(22)

International career
1993	Croatia U21	1	(0)
1999	Croatia B	1	(0)
1997–2002	Croatia	30	(0)
- * Club domestic league appearances and goals

Daniel Šarić (born 4 August 1972 in Rijeka) is a Croatian former footballer who played as a right wingback. His name is sometimes spelled as Danijel Šarić.

== Club career ==
Born in Rijeka, Šarić started his professional career at local club NK Rijeka back in 1989. He went on to move to Spanish club Sporting de Gijón in 1993 and subsequently returned to Croatia by signing with Dinamo Zagreb in 1995. After five years with Dinamo, he went on to move abroad once again by signing with Greek club Panathinaikos for the 2000–01 season. He stayed at Panathinaikos until the summer of 2003 and then returned to his home town by signing a four-year contract with NK Rijeka. He retired in July 2007 after the contract expired.

== International career ==
Šarić was also an almost regular member of the Croatia national team between 1997 and 2002. He made his debut for Croatia in an October 1997 World Cup qualification match away against Slovenia and earned a total of 30 caps, scoring no goals. His only major tournament was the 2002 FIFA World Cup, where he appeared in all of the Croatian team's three group matches and was a starting player in two of them. His final international was a September 2002 European Championship qualification match against Estonia.

== Statistics ==
=== Club ===
Club performance			League		Cup		League Cup		Continental		Total	
Season	Club	League	Apps	Goals	Apps	Goals	Apps	Goals	Apps	Goals	Apps	Goals
Yugoslavia			League		Yugoslav Cup		League Cup		Europe		Total	
1989–90	NK Rijeka	Yugoslav First League	1	0	0	0	–		–		1	0
1990–91	NK Rijeka	Yugoslav First League	3	0	1	0	–		–		4	0
Croatia			League		Croatian Cup		Super Cup		Europe		Total	
1992	HNK Rijeka	Prva HNL	18	2	4	0	–		–		22	2
1992–93	HNK Rijeka	Prva HNL	27	6	4	2	–		–		31	8
1993–94	HNK Rijeka	Prva HNL	4	0	1	0	–		–		5	0
Spain			League		Copa del Rey		Supercopa		Europe		Total	
1993–94	Sporting de Gijón	La Liga	22	2	1	0	–	–	–	–	23	2
1994–95	Sporting de Gijón	La Liga	11	1	4	0	–	–	–	–	15	1
Croatia			League		Croatian Cup		Super Cup		Europe		Total	
1995–96	Croatia Zagreb	Prva HNL	4	0	3	0	–		0	0	7	0
1996–97	Croatia Zagreb	Prva HNL	21	2	4	1	–		4	2	29	5
1997–98	Croatia Zagreb	Prva HNL	23	5	5	0	–		10	1	38	6
1998–99	Croatia Zagreb	Prva HNL	26	1	1	0	–		6	0	33	1
1999–00	Croatia Zagreb	Prva HNL	28	1	6	0	–		7	0	41	1
Greece			League		Greek Cup		Super Cup		Europe		Total	
2000–01	Panathinaikos	Alpha Ethniki	19	0	–		–		6	0	25	0
2001–02	Panathinaikos	Alpha Ethniki	13	1	–		–		10	0	23	1
2002–03	Panathinaikos	Alpha Ethniki	11	0	–		–		2	0	13	0
Croatia			League		Croatian Cup		Super Cup		Europe		Total	
2003–04	HNK Rijeka	Prva HNL	24	0	6	0	–		–		30	0
2004–05	HNK Rijeka	Prva HNL	21	1	3	0	–		2	0	26	1
2005–06	HNK Rijeka	Prva HNL	28	0	7	0	1	0	2	0	38	0
2006–07	HNK Rijeka	Prva HNL	23	0	5	0	1	0	1	0	30	0
Total	Rijeka		149	8	31	2	2	0	5	0	187	10
Total	Sporting de Gijón		33	3	5	0	0	0	0	0	38	3
Total	Croatia Zagreb		102	9	19	1	0	0	27	3	148	13
Total	Panathinaikos		43	1	0	0	0	0	18	0	61	1
Career total			327	22	55	3	2	0	50	3	431	28

=== International ===
Croatia national team
Year	Apps	Goals
1997	3	0
1998	2	0
1999	8	0
2000	5	0
2001	6	0
2002	6	0
Total	30	0

== Honours ==
Rijeka

- Croatian Cup (2): 2005, 2006

Dinamo Zagreb

- Prva HNL (5): 1995–96, 1996–97, 1997–98, 1998–99, 1999–00
- Croatian Cup (3): 1996, 1997, 1998

Individual

- NK Rijeka all time XI
