= 2005–06 Croatian Football Cup =

Tournament details
- Country: Croatia
- Teams: 48

Final positions
- Champions: Rijeka (2nd title)
- Runners-up: Varteks

Tournament statistics
- Matches played: 54
- Goals scored: 200 (3.7 per match)
- Top goal scorer: Leon Benko (9)

The 2005–06 Croatian Football Cup was the fifteenth season of Croatia's football knockout competition.

== Calendar ==
Round	Main date	Number of fixtures	Clubs	New entries this round
Preliminary round	31 August 2005	16	48 → 32	none
First round	21 September 2005	16	32 → 16	16
Second round	19 October 2005	8	16 → 8	none
Quarter-finals	9 and 15 November 2005	8	8 → 4	none
Semi-finals	29 March and 5 April 2006	4	4 → 2	none
Final	26 April and 3 May 2006	2	2 → 1	none

== Preliminary round ==
The preliminary round was held on 31 August 2005.

Tie no	Home team	Score	Away team
1	Vukovar '91	5–1	Papuk
2	Hajduk Hercegovac	1–3	ZET
3	Samobor	1–0	Konavljanin
4	Moslavina	3–1	Istra Pula
5	Graničar	2–5	Zagorec
6	Slavonija Požega	0–0 (4–3 p)	Koprivnica
7	Podravina	1–3	Jedinstvo Omladinac
8	Mladost Sigetec	0–2	Belišće
9	Ogulin	13–0	Croatia Turanj
10	Čakovec	3–1	Nehaj
11	Vodice	0–0 (5–4 p)	Oriolik
12	HAŠK	3–2	Zadrugar Oprisavci
13	Višnjevac	0–4	Međimurje
14	Hrvace	5–0	Naprijed Hreljin
15	Bjelovar	2–3	Segesta
16	Vinogradar	7–1	Kalinovac

== First round ==
Matches played on 21 September 2005.

Tie no	Home team	Score	Away team
1	HAŠK	0–8	Dinamo Zagreb
2	Hrvace	0–3	Hajduk Split
3	Ogulin	2–3	Varteks
4	Jedinstvo Omladinac	0–2	Rijeka
5	Vodice	0–5	Osijek
6	ZET	1–0	Pula Staro Češko
7	Moslavina	1–0	NK Zagreb
8	Slavonija Požega	1–3	Kamen Ingrad
9	Samobor	1–4	Cibalia
10	Vinogradar	2–1	Pomorac
11	Vukovar '91	0–3	Slaven Belupo
12	Čakovec	0–4	Inter Zaprešić
13	Međimurje	2–0	Zadar
14	Zagorec	0–3	Hrvatski Dragovoljac
15	Segesta	1–0	Belišće
16	Naftaš Ivanić	2–0	Šibenik

== Second round ==
Matches played on 19 October 2005.

Tie no	Home team	Score	Away team
1	Naftaš Ivanić	3–2	Dinamo Zagreb
2	Segesta	1–2	Hajduk Split
3	Hrvatski Dragovoljac	0–2	Varteks
4	Rijeka	3–1	Međimurje
5	Osijek	2–0	Inter Zaprešić
6	Slaven Belupo	5–0	ZET
7	Vinogradar	3–2	Moslavina
8	Cibalia	1–3	Kamen Ingrad

== Quarter-finals ==
First legs were held on 9 November and second legs on 15 November 2005.

Team 1	Agg.	Team 2	1st leg	2nd leg
Osijek	2–3	Hajduk Split	1–1	1–2
Slaven Belupo	2–4	Kamen Ingrad	1–0	1–4
Varteks	5–2	Naftaš Ivanić	4–1	1–1
Vinogradar	1–10	Rijeka	1–2	0–8

== Semi-finals ==
29 March 2006
17:30

Hajduk Split	1–1	Rijeka
Kranjčar 21' (pen.)	Report (in Croatian)	Vugrinec 55'

Stadion Poljud, Split
Attendance: 8,000
Referee: Željko Širić (Osijek)
5 April 2006
17:30

Rijeka	1–0	Hajduk Split
Novaković 23'	Report (in Croatian)

Stadion Kantrida, Rijeka
Attendance: 8,000
Referee: Draženko Kovačić (Križevci)

Rijeka won 2–1 on aggregate.

29 March 2006
17:00

Varteks	3–3	Kamen Ingrad
Benko 53', 70'; Pokrivač 50'	Report (in Croatian)	Parmaković 30'; Lakić 61'; Brajković 81'

Stadion Varteks, Varaždin
Attendance: 2,000
Referee: Edo Trivković (Split)
5 April 2006
18:00

Kamen Ingrad	1–2	Varteks
Zelenika 88'	Report (in Croatian)	Pavličić 10'; Jolić 25'

Stadion Kamen Ingrad, Velika
Attendance: 400
Referee: Vlado Svilokos (Sisak)

Varteks won 5–4 on aggregate.

== Final ==
=== First leg ===
26 April 2006
17:30

Rijeka	4–0	Varteks
Vugrinec 20', 68'; Linić 43'; Bobič 81'	Report (in Croatian)

Stadion Kantrida, Rijeka
Attendance: 8,000
Referee: Draženko Kovačić (Križevci)

=== Second leg ===
3 May 2006
20:15

Varteks	5–1	Rijeka
Lučić 23'; Benko 54'; Šafarić 84' (pen.); Novinić 90', 91'	Report (in Croatian)	Vugrinec 77'

Stadion Varteks, Varaždin
Attendance: 7,000
Referee: Alojzije Šupraha (Kolan)

Aggregate score was 5–5, Rijeka won on away goals rule.

== See also ==
- 2005–06 Croatian First Football League
- 2005–06 Croatian Second Football League
