= Dragan Tadić =

Croatian footballer

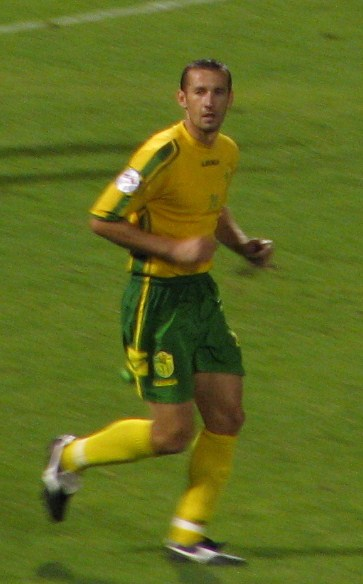

Personal information
- Date of birth: 12 February 1973 (age 53)
- Place of birth: Rijeka, Croatia
- Height: 1.81 m (5 ft 11 in)
- Position: Midfielder

Youth career
- Grobničan
- Rijeka

Senior career*
Years	Team	Apps	(Gls)
1990–1995	Rijeka	71	(4)
1991	→ Koper (loan)		
1991–1992	→ Primorje (loan)		
1995	Istra	4	(0)
1995–1997	Segesta	60	(6)
1997–2003	Harelbeke	35	(1)
2003–2007	Rijeka	89	(5)
2007	Zadar	15	(2)
2007–2008	Novalja		
2008–2010	Istra 1961	44	(0)
2010–2011	Novalja	16	(3)

Managerial career
- 2012–2013: Rijeka (assistant)
- 2014: Slaven Belupo (assistant)
- 2014–2015: Opatija
- 2015–2020: Mesaimeer (assistant)
- 2021–2022: Rijeka II
- 2022: Hrvatski Dragovoljac
- 2022: Rijeka
- 2023–2024: Al-Bukiryah (assistant)
- 2024: Al-Bukiryah
- * Club domestic league appearances and goals as of 13:51, 20 December 2013 (UTC)

Dragan Tadić (born 12 February 1973) is a Croatian retired football midfielder and manager.

== Club career ==
He spent the peak years of his career playing for various clubs in Croatia’s Prva HNL, including close to 200 official games for HNK Rijeka. He played the 1996 UEFA Intertoto Cup with Segesta where they lost in the final to Danish club Silkeborg IF. Abroad he played in Belgium with KRC Harelbeke.

== Managerial career ==
He started his career working as an assistant to Elvis Scoria at Rijeka and Slaven Belupo. Tadić replaced Davor Mladina at the helm at Hrvatski Dragovoljac in January 2022 and was dismissed as manager of Rijeka in August 2022 after only 4 league games.

On 9 February 2024, Tadić was appointed as manager of Saudi First Division club Al-Bukiryah following the sacking of Darko Nović. He was the assistant of Nović at Al-Bukiryah. On 1 April 2024, Tadić was sacked after a 3–1 defeat to Al-Najma.

=== Club statistics ===
Club performance			League		Cup		League Cup		Continental		Total	
Season	Club	League	Apps	Goals	Apps	Goals	Apps	Goals	Apps	Goals	Apps	Goals
Croatia			League		Croatian Cup		Super Cup		Europe		Total	
1992–93	NK Rijeka	Prva HNL	16	1	2	1	–	–	–	–	18	2
1993–94	NK Rijeka	Prva HNL	26	1	7	2	–	–	–	–	33	3
1994–95	NK Rijeka	Prva HNL	29	2	6	0	–	–	–	–	35	2
1995–96	NK Istra	Prva HNL	4	0	–	–	–	–	–	–	4	0
1995–96	HNK Segesta	Prva HNL	33	3	4	0	–	–	–	–	37	3
1996–97	HNK Segesta	Prva HNL	27	3	2	0	–	–	8	1	37	4
Belgian			League		Belgian Cup		Super Cup		Europe		Total	
1997–98	Harelbeke	First Division A	21	1	2	0	–	–	–	–	23	0
1998–99	Harelbeke	First Division A	14	0	1	0	–	–	2	0	17	0
Croatia			League		Croatian Cup		Super Cup		Europe		Total	
2003–04	HNK Rijeka	Prva HNL	17	1	2	1	–	–	–	–	20	2
2004–05	HNK Rijeka	Prva HNL	27	2	8	1	–	–	2	0	37	3
2005–06	HNK Rijeka	Prva HNL	32	0	6	0	1	0	2	0	41	0
2006–07	HNK Rijeka	Prva HNL	13	2	–	–	1	0	–	–	14	2
2006–07	NK Zadar	Druga HNL	13	0	2	0	–	–	1	0	17	0
2007–08	NK Zadar	Prva HNL	2	0	–	–	–	–	–	–	2	0
2007–08	NK Novalja	3. HNL - West	–	–	1	1	–	–	–	–	1	1
2008–09	NK Istra 1961	Druga HNL	29	0	1	0	–	–	–	–	30	0
2009–10	NK Istra 1961	Prva HNL	15	0	2	0	–	–	–	–	30	0
2010–11	NK Novalja	3. HNL - West	16	3	0	0	–	–	–	–	16	3
Total	Rijeka		160	9	46	6	2	0	4	0	212	15
Total	Career		334	16	31	5	3	0	17	1	400	23

== Managerial statistics ==
Managerial record by team and tenure
Club	From	To	Record							
Club	From	To	P	W	D	L	GF	GA	GD	Win %
Rijeka II	1 July 2021	11 January 2022	16	6	8	2	0	0	+0	37.50
NK Hrvatski Dragovoljac	12 January 2022	31 May 2022	16	3	3	10	0	0	+0	18.75
Rijeka	20 June 2022	17 August 2022	6	1	1	4	0	0	+0	16.67
Al-Bukiryah	9 February 2024	1 April 2024	7	3	0	4	0	0	+0	42.86
Total			45	13	12	20	0	0	+0	28.89

== Honours ==
Rijeka

- Croatian Cup: 2004–05, 2005–06

Zadar

- 2.HNL Promotion: 2006–07

Istra 1961

- 2.HNL: 2008–09
