= Siniša Linić =

Croatian footballer

Personal information
- Full name: Siniša Linić
- Date of birth: 23 August 1982 (age 44)
- Place of birth: Rijeka, SR Croatia, SFR Yugoslavia
- Height: 1.76 m (5 ft 9 1/2 in)
- Position: Midfielder

Team information
- Current team: Grobničan

Senior career*
Years	Team	Apps	(Gls)
1999–2007	Rijeka	136	(14)
2001–2002	→ Orijent (loan)	23	(3)
2007–2009	Hajduk	40	(4)
2009–2010	Bnei Yehuda	29	(1)
2010–2011	Istra 1961	21	(5)
2011–2012	Koper	23	(0)
2012	Istra 1961	5	(0)
2015–2020	Grobničan	68	(13)

International career
2006	Croatia	1	(0)
- * Club domestic league appearances and goals as of 2 June 2019

Siniša Linić (born 23 August 1982) is a Croatian retired football midfielder who last played for Grobničan.

== Club career ==
After joining NK Rijeka in 1999, he played for two seasons, but limited playing time saw him moving to NK Orijent in 2001. He rejoined NK Rijeka in 2002 for five more seasons before moving to Hajduk Split in 2007. In his first season at Hajduk Split he played 25 games and scored 3 goals. In his second season at the club he played 15 games and scored once. In June 2009 he was released along with three other Hajduk Split players and soon signed for the Israeli side Bnei Yehuda in July 2009. In August 2010 he went to NK Istra 1961 on a free transfer. Although the press linked him in June 2011 with his first club NK Rijeka, Linić signed with the Slovenian club FC Luka Koper.

== International career ==
Linić has made one appearance for the Croatia national team. This came against Hong Kong at the Carlsberg Cup exhibition tournament on 1 February 2006.

== Career statistics ==
=== Club ===
Club performance			League		Cup		League Cup		Continental		Total	
Season	Club	League	Apps	Goals	Apps	Goals	Apps	Goals	Apps	Goals	Apps	Goals
Croatia			League		Croatian Cup		Super Cup		Europe		Total	
1999–00	HNK Rijeka	Prva HNL	2	0	0	0	–		0	0	2	0
2000–01	HNK Rijeka	Prva HNL	0	0	0	0	–		0	0	0	0
2001–02	NK Orijent	2. HNL - South	23	3	0	0	–		–		23	3
2002–03	HNK Rijeka	Prva HNL	19	0	1	0	–		0	0	20	0
2003–04	HNK Rijeka	Prva HNL	28	1	4	1	–		–		32	2
2004–05	HNK Rijeka	Prva HNL	31	6	8	1	–		2	0	41	7
2005–06	HNK Rijeka	Prva HNL	29	6	8	7	1	0	2	0	40	13
2006–07	HNK Rijeka	Prva HNL	26	1	6	0	1	0	2	0	35	1
2007–08	HNK Hajduk Split	Prva HNL	25	3	7	0	–		2	0	34	3
2008–09	HNK Hajduk Split	Prva HNL	15	1	5	0	–		4	0	29	1
Israel			League		State Cup		Toto Cup		Europe		Total	
2009–10	Bnei Yehuda	Israel Championship	29	1	0	0	0	0	7	0	36	1
Croatia			League		Croatian Cup		Super Cup		Europe		Total	
2010–11	NK Istra 1961	Prva HNL	21	5	2	0	–		0	0	2	0
Slovenia			League		Slovenian Cup		Super Cup		Europe		Total	
2011–12	FC Koper	PrvaLiga	23	0	2	0	–		–		25	0
Croatia			League		Croatian Cup		Super Cup		Europe		Total	
2012–13	NK Istra 1961	Prva HNL	5	0	1	0	–		–		6	0
Country	Croatia		202	23	43	9	2	0	12	0	257	34
Country	Israel		29	1	0	0	0	0	7	0	36	1
Country	Slovenia		23	0	2	0	0	0	0	0	25	0
Total			254	24	45	9	2	0	19	0	320	35

=== International appearances ===
Croatia national team
Year	Apps	Goals
2006	1	0
Total	1	0

== Honours ==
Rijeka

- Croatian Cup: 2005, 2006

Grobničan

- 4. HNL - Zapad: 2017–18
