= NK Kamen Ingrad =

Defunct Croatian football club

- Full name: Nogometni klub Kamen Ingrad
- Founded: 1929
- Dissolved: 2008
- Ground: Stadion Kamen Ingrad; Velika, Croatia
- Capacity: 10,000
- Manager: Janez Hovhovčič
Home colours	Away colours

NK Kamen Ingrad was a Croatian football club from Velika, a small town near Požega in the northeast of Croatia. The club was dissolved in July 2008 after serious financial problems.

== History ==
The club was formed as NK Velika in 1929. After World War II the club was renamed to NK Papuk.

The current name was adopted in 1999, when the club's main sponsor became a local construction company called Kamen Ingrad. Since then the club advanced significantly, having been promoted to Prva HNL in 2002 and entering the UEFA Cup in 2003, losing to Schalke 1–0 on aggregate in the first round.

Kamen Ingrad got relegated in the 2006–07 season after winning only 11 points in 33 matches and ending in 12th place. Originally they won 13 points, but after playing with two ineligible players in two matches, HNS punished them by deducting two points.

Various financial difficulties, caused by the problems in the primary club sponsor Kamen Ingrad, reflected on the club's performance, and it was relegated further down to the Treća HNL in 2008. On 23 July 2008, it was announced that the club's first team will not take part in any competitions during the 2008–09 season, making the club's future after that uncertain. Eventually it became obvious that Kamen Ingrad ceased operations entirely. New club NK Papuk was formed out of the ashes of Kamen Ingrad, but legally it is a distinct and separate club, and is not entitled to claim the history of the Kamen Ingrad.

== Honours ==
- Croatian Second Level (1): 2000–01
- Croatian Third Level – Division North (1): 1999–2000

== Seasons ==
Season	League									Cup	European competitions		Top goalscorer	
Season	Division	P	W	D	L	F	A	Pts	Pos	Cup	European competitions		Player	Goals
1999–2000	3. HNL	30	24	6	0	88	19	78	1st	DNQ				
2000–01	2. HNL	34	23	5	6	78	32	74	1st	QF				
2001–02	1. HNL	30	9	8	13	28	46	35	12th	R2			Joško Popović	7
2002–03	1. HNL	32	11	11	10	34	34	44	4th	SF			Zoran Zekić	14
2003–04	1. HNL	32	13	7	12	45	36	46	7th	QF	UEFA Cup	R1	Zoran Zekić	13
2004–05	1. HNL	32	12	5	15	36	39	41	9th	R1	Intertoto Cup	R2	Edin Šaranović	8
2005–06	1. HNL	32	11	5	16	33	47	38	6th	SF			Srđan Lakić	12
2006–07	1. HNL	33	3	4	26	27	77	11^{(−2)}	12th	R2			Ilija Sivonjić	7
2007–08	2. HNL	30	7	7	16	26	49	28	14th	R1			Marijan Nikolić	9

Key
League: P = Matches played; W = Matches won; D = Matches drawn; L = Matches lost; F = Goals for; A = Goals against; Pts = Points won; Pos = Final position;
Cup / Europe: DNQ = Did not qualify; R1 = First round; R2 = Second round; QF = Quarter-final; SF = Semi-final; RU = Runner-up; W = Competition won

== European record ==
=== Summary ===
Competition	Pld	W	D	L	GF	GA	Last season played
UEFA Cup	4	2	1	1	9	2	2003–04
UEFA Intertoto Cup	2	0	0	2	1	5	2004
Total	6	2	1	3	10	7	

Source: uefa.com, Last updated on 7 September 2022
Pld = Matches played; W = Matches won; D = Matches drawn; L = Matches lost; GF = Goals for; GA = Goals against. Defunct competitions indicated in italics.

=== Record by season ===
Season	Competition	Round	Opponent	Home	Away	Agg.
2003–04	UEFA Cup	QR	(Luxembourg) Etzella Ettelbruck	7–0	2–1	9–1
2003–04	UEFA Cup	R1	(Germany) Schalke 04	0–0	0–1	0–1
2004–05	Intertoto Cup	R2	(Russia) Spartak Moscow	0–1	1–4	1–5

Note: Kamen Ingrad score always listed first.

== Historical list of coaches ==
- (Croatia) Tonko Vukušić (1999–00)
- (Croatia) Tomislav Radić (2001)
- (Croatia) Rajko Magić (2002)
- (Croatia) Vjeran Simunić (2002)
- (Croatia) Milan Tomljenović (2002–03)
- (Croatia) Nenad Gračan (2003–04)
- (Croatia) Hrvoje Braović (2004–05)
- (Croatia) Ivica Matković (2005–06)
- (Croatia) Ante Čačić (2006)
- (Croatia) Milan Tomljenović (2006)
- (Croatia) Stjepan Čordaš (2007)
- (Croatia) Dalibor Bognar (2007–08)
