= Igor Novaković =

Serbian political scientist (born 1981)

- Born: 9 December 1981 (age 44); Novi Sad

Academic background
- Education: University of Novi Sad; University of Belgrade; University of Bologna
- Thesis: Permanently neutral states in Europe in the post-cold war period: (1989-2011) (2006)

Academic work
- Institutions: International and Security Affairs Centre - ISAC Fund
- Main interests: European Studies international relations political and military neutrality international security Serbo-Albanian Relations

Igor Novaković (born 9 December 1981) is a Serbian political scientist and director of research at The International and Security Affairs Centre - ISAC Fund.

== Biography ==
Igor Novaković was born on 9 December 1981 in Novi Sad. He graduated in 2005 from the University of Novi Sad Faculty of Philosophy, and then enrolled in the Interdisciplinary Master's Program in European Studies in English (CAESAR) at the same university. He later studied international relations at the Robert Rufili Faculty of Political Science University of Bologna, and spent one semester at New Bulgarian University in Sofia. He completed his master's degree in 2010.

Since January 2010 he has been employed by The International and Security Affairs Centre - ISAC Fund in Belgrade as a research associate. He became Research Director in 2015. In 2012 he became an associate of the international non-governmental organization The Council for Inclusive Governance (CIG). He received his PhD from the University of Belgrade Faculty of Political Sciences in 2016.

He is the coordinator of the Working Groups for Chapter 30 and 31 of the National Convention on the European Union. He also occasionally writes for the European Western Balkans portal. He is fluent in English, and speaks Italian and Bulgarian.

== Selected bibliography ==
Novaković is the author, co-author and editor of several publications, scientific and professional papers, as well as proposals for practical policy in the fields of European Studies, international relations, political and military neutrality, international security, Serbo-Albanian Relations and more.

- Novaković, Igor (2019). Stalno neutralne države u posthladnoratovskom periodu. Belgrade: Intstitute for european studies.
- Novaković, Igor (2013). The rise of political extremism in Bulgaria - The political party “Ataka”. Bologna: PECOB. ISBN 978-88-96951-33-0.
- Novkoavić, Igor (2015). Vodič kroz poglavlje 31 pretpristupnih pregovora Srbije sa Evropskom unijom. Belgrade: ISAC fund.
- Novaković, Igor (2013). The rise of political extremism in Bulgaria - The political party “Ataka”. Bologna: University of Bologna.
- Novaković, Igor (ur.) (2013). Neutrality in the 21st century : lessons for Serbia(. Beograd: Centar za međunarodne i bezbednosne poslove – ISAC Fond.
- Novaković, Igor (2015). "Manjinsko pitanje i uticaj na bilateralne odnose sa susednim državama u svetlu procesa pridruživanja Evropskoj uniji. Slučaj Srbije". Međunarodna politika (br. 1158-1159): 155–163.
- Novaković, Igor (2014). "Serbien". Südosteuropa im Zwiespalt Reaktionen aus den Ländern auf die Ereignisse in der Ukraine (Friedrich Ebert Stiftung).
- Novaković, Igor (2012). Nеutrаlnоst u XXI vеku i slučај Srbiје. Beograd: Centar za međunarodne i bezbednosne poslove – ISAC fond.
- Novaković, Igor (2011). Srpskо-аlbаnski оdnоsi - pоglеd iz Аlbаniје. Beograd: Centar za međunarodne i bezbednosne poslove – ISAC fond.
- Novaković, Igor (2011). ""Kоncеpt nеutrаlnе držаvе". Međunarodna politika. Begograd: Institut zа mеđunаrоdnu pоlitiku i privrеdu: 5–20.
- Novaković, Igor (2010). ""Мultilаtеrаlnе оpеrаciје-NАТО". Bezbednost Zapadnog Balkana. Beograd: Beogradski centar za bezbednosnu politiku: 25–37.
- Novaković, Igor; Petrović, Žarko; Đukanović, Dragan (2010). Srpskо-аlbаnski оdnоsi, stаnjе i pеrspеktivе. Beograd: Centar za međunarodne i bezbednosne poslove – ISAC fond.
- Novaković, Igor (2011). Serbia and Albania : preparing for a new start. Belgrade: ISAC fund.
- Gashi, Shpetim; Novaković, Novaković (2017). From technical negotiations to comprehensive normalization : relations between Belgrade and Pristina. Belgrade: Konrad Adenauer Stiftung.
