= 2004–05 HNK Hajduk Split season =

Hajduk Split
2004–05 season
- Chairman: Branko Grgić
- Manager: Ivan Katalinić (until 24 August 2004); Blaž Slišković (from 24 August 2004 to 10 April 2005); Igor Štimac
- Prva HNL: 1st
- Croatian Cup: Runners-up
- Champions League: Second qualifying round
- Croatian Supercup: Winners
- Top goalscorer: League: Tomislav Bušić (11); All: Dragan Blatnjak (14)
- Highest home attendance: 35,000 (Two matches)
- Lowest home attendance: 1,500 vs Međimurje (6 November 2004)
- Average home league attendance: 8,656

The 2004–05 season was the 94th season in Hajduk Split’s history and their fourteenth in the Prva HNL. Their 1st place finish in the 2003–04 season meant it was their 14th successive season playing in the Prva HNL.

== First-team squad ==
Squad at end of season

Note: Flags indicate national team as defined under FIFA eligibility rules; some limited exceptions apply. Players may hold more than one non-FIFA nationality.

No.	Pos.	Nation	Player
1	GK	CRO	Matko Perdijić
2	DF	CRO	Petar Šuto
3	DF	CRO	Ferdo Milin
4	MF	CRO	Frane Čačić
5	FW	BIH	Almir Turković
6	DF	CRO	Vlatko Đolonga
7	DF	CRO	Hrvoje Vejić
8	FW	BIH	Dragan Blatnjak
9	FW	CRO	Mate Dragičević
10	MF	CRO	Niko Kranjčar
11	FW	CRO	Natko Rački
12	GK	CRO	Vladimir Balić
13	MF	CRO	Mladen Bartulović
14	MF	BIH	Dario Damjanović

No.	Pos.	Nation	Player
15	MF	CRO	Nenad Pralija
16	MF	CRO	Zoran Roglić
17	DF	CRO	Tonči Žilić
18	MF	CRO	Ivan Leko
19	GK	CRO	Tvrtko Kale
20	MF	URU	Pablo Munhoz
21	MF	BIH	Bulend Biščević
23	FW	CRO	Krunoslav Lovrek
24	MF	CRO	Mario Grgurović
26	DF	CRO	Tomislav Rukavina
27	DF	CRO	Luka Vučko
29	MF	CRO	Danijel Hrman
30	FW	CRO	Tomislav Bušić

=== Left club during season ===
Note: Flags indicate national team as defined under FIFA eligibility rules; some limited exceptions apply. Players may hold more than one non-FIFA nationality.

No.	Pos.	Nation	Player
10	MF	CRO	Mario Carević (to Al-Ittihad)
18	FW	BIH	Mirza Mešić (to Žepče)
21	MF	CRO	Darko Miladin (to Schaffhausen)

No.	Pos.	Nation	Player
22	MF	SVN	Suad Fileković (to Ergotelis)
23	DF	CRO	Mato Neretljak (to Suwon Bluewings)
29	MF	CRO	Frane Lojić (to Zadar)

== Competitions ==
=== Overall record ===
Performance by competition
Competition	Starting round	Final position/round	First match	Last match
Prva HNL	—N/a	Winners	23 July 2004	28 May 2005
Croatian Football Cup	First round	Runners-up	22 September 2004	25 May 2005
Super Cup	—N/a	Winners	17 July 2004	
UEFA Champions League	Second qualifying round		28 July 2004	4 August 2004

Statistics by competition
Competition	Pld	W	D	L	GF	GA	GD	Win%
Prva HNL	32	16	8	8	58	33	+25	50.00
Croatian Football Cup	8	4	1	3	13	10	+3	50.00
Super Cup	1	1	0	0	1	0	+1	100.00
UEFA Champions League	2	1	0	1	3	4	−1	50.00
Total	43	22	9	12	75	47	+28	51.16

=== Prva HNL ===
==== First stage ====
Pos	Team	Pld	W	D	L	GF	GA	GD	Pts	Qualification
1	Hajduk Split	22	13	3	6	39	23	+16	42	Qualification to championship group
2	Rijeka	22	10	8	4	37	23	+14	38	Qualification to championship group
3	Slaven Belupo	22	11	4	7	29	25	+4	37	Qualification to championship group
4	Inter Zaprešić	22	10	5	7	25	22	+3	35	Qualification to championship group
5	Varteks	22	11	1	10	39	30	+9	34	Qualification to championship group

Source: RSSSF.org
Rules for classification: 1st points; 2nd head-to-head points; 3rd head-to-head goal difference; 4th head-to-head away goals scored

==== Second stage (championship play-off) ====
Pos	Team	Pld	W	D	L	GF	GA	GD	Pts	Qualification
1	Hajduk Split (C)	32	16	8	8	58	33	+25	56	Qualification to Champions League second qualifying round
2	Inter Zaprešić	32	15	9	8	44	39	+5	54	Qualification to UEFA Cup second qualifying round
3	NK Zagreb	32	15	5	12	50	42	+8	50	
4	Rijeka	32	11	14	7	52	40	+12	47	Qualification to UEFA Cup second qualifying round
5	Varteks	32	14	3	15	53	50	+3	45	Qualification to Intertoto Cup first round
6	Slaven Belupo	32	12	9	11	37	41	−4	45	Qualification to Intertoto Cup first round

Source: RSSSF.org
Rules for classification: 1st points; 2nd head-to-head points; 3rd head-to-head goal difference; 4th head-to-head away goals scored
(C) Champions

==== Results summary ====
Overall								Home						Away					
Pld	W	D	L	GF	GA	GD	Pts	W	D	L	GF	GA	GD	W	D	L	GF	GA	GD
32	16	8	8	58	33	+25	56	10	4	2	34	11	+23	6	4	6	24	22	+2

Last updated: 28 May 2005.
Source: Sportnet.hr

==== Results by round ====
Round	1	2	3	4	5	6	7	8	9	10	11	12	13	14	15	16	17	18	19	20	21	22	23	24	25	26	27	28	29	30	31	32
Ground	H	H	A	H	A	H	A	H	A	H	A	A	A	H	A	H	A	H	A	H	A	H	H	H	A	H	A	A	A	H	A	H
Result	D	L	W	W	L	W	L	D	W	W	W	W	L	W	L	W	W	W	D	W	L	W	L	D	D	W	W	L	D	D	D	W
Position	7	9	6	3	5	3	6	4	4	3	3	3	3	2	2	2	1	1	1	1	1	1	1	1	1	1	1	1	1	1	1	1

Source: Competitive matches
A = Away; H = Home; W = Win; D = Draw; L = Loss

==== Results by opponent ====
Team	1–22		23–32		Points
Team	1	2	1	2	Points
Dinamo Zagreb	0–3	1–0	—	—	3
Inter Zaprešić	3–1	2–0	5–1	1–1	10
Kamen Ingrad	2–0	1–2	—	—	3
Međimurje	3–1	2–0	—	—	6
Osijek	1–1	2–2	—	—	2
Pula 1856	1–1	1–0	—	—	4
Rijeka	2–0	0–2	1–1	1–1	5
Slaven Belupo	0–1	2–1	1–1	0–0	5
Varteks	4–0	3–1	2–1	6–0	12
Zadar	4–0	3–1	—	—	6
NK Zagreb	2–4	0–2	0–1	2–3	0

Source: 2004–05 Croatian First Football League article

== Matches ==
=== Croatian Football Super Cup ===
17 July 2004 Final	Hajduk Split	1–0	Dinamo Zagreb	Split
20:45 CEST (UTC+02:00)	Blatnjak 49'	Report		Stadium: Stadion Poljud; Attendance: 17,000; Referee: Ivan Bebek (Rijeka)

Source: HRnogomet.com

=== Prva HNL ===
==== First stage ====
23 July 2004 1	Hajduk Split	1–1	Pula 1856	Split
20:00 CEST (UTC+02:00)	Turković 46'	Report	Pamić 37'	Stadium: Stadion Poljud; Attendance: 4,000; Referee: Igor Križarić (Čakovec)

31 July 2004 2	Hajduk Split	2–4	NK Zagreb	Split
20:45 CEST (UTC+02:00)	Žilić 33'; Vejić 44'	Report	Ješe 24', 31' (pen.); Jakirović (yellow card) 45' (yellow-red card) 88' (goal) 88'; Vidović 90'	Stadium: Stadion Poljud; Attendance: 2,000; Referee: Draženko Kovačić (Križevci)

8 August 2004 3	Međimurje	1–3	Hajduk Split	Čakovec
17:30 CET (UTC+01:00)	André 47'	Report	Blatnjak 5'; Neretljak 60'; Damjanović 77'	Stadium: Stadion SRC Mladost; Attendance: 4,000; Referee: Igor Pristovnik (Zagreb)

14 August 2004 4	Hajduk Split	2–0	Kamen Ingrad	Split
20:00 CEST (UTC+02:00)	Bušić 49', 89'	Report		Stadium: Stadion Poljud; Attendance: 2,000; Referee: Marin Mlinar (Zagreb)

21 August 2004 5	Slaven Belupo	1–0	Hajduk Split	Koprivnica
16:00 CEST (UTC+02:00)	Vručina 86'	Report		Stadium: Gradski stadion Attendance: 3,000; Referee: Željko Širić (Osijek)

28 August 2004 6	Hajduk Split	4–0	Zadar	Split
19:00 CEST (UTC+02:00)	Blatnjak 1'; Pralija 34'; Bušić 63'; Kale 88' (pen.)	Report		Stadium: Stadion Poljud; Attendance: 2,000; Referee: Domagoj Vučkov (Rijeka)

11 September 2004 7	Dinamo Zagreb	3–0	Hajduk Split	Zagreb
20:30 CEST (UTC+02:00)	Eduardo 3'; Zahora 8'; Karić 63'	Report	Miladin (red card) 42'	Stadium: Stadion Maksimir; Attendance: 18,000; Referee: Ivan Novak (Varaždin)

18 September 2004 8	Hajduk Split	1–1	Osijek	Split
18:00 CEST (UTC+02:00)	Turković 74'	Report	Ostopanj 42'	Stadium: Stadion Poljud; Attendance: 2,500; Referee: Vlado Svilokos (Sisak)

25 September 2004 9	Varteks	0–4	Hajduk Split	Varaždin
18:00 CEST (UTC+02:00)		Report	Blatnjak 6', 17'; Čačić 68'; Turković 90'	Stadium: Stadion Varteks; Attendance: 3,500; Referee: Ivan Bebek (Rijeka)

2 October 2004 10	Hajduk Split	2–0	Rijeka	Split
18:00 CEST (UTC+02:00)	Munhoz 16'; Čačić 70' (pen.)	Report		Stadium: Stadion Poljud; Attendance: 5,000; Referee: Marin Mlinar (Zagreb)

16 October 2004 11	Inter Zaprešić	1–3	Hajduk Split	Zaprešić
14:00 CEST (UTC+02:00)	Ćorluka 21'	Report	Dragičević 66', 77'; Grgurović 90+3'	Stadium: Stadion ŠRC Zaprešić; Attendance: 4,000; Referee: Vlado Svilokos (Sisak)

23 October 2004 12	Pula 1856	0–1	Hajduk Split	Pula
17:30 CEST (UTC+02:00)		Report	Kontešić 58' (o.g.)	Stadium: Stadion Veruda; Attendance: 4,000; Referee: Marijo Strahonja (Zagreb)

30 October 2004 13	NK Zagreb	2–0	Hajduk Split	Zagreb
14:00 CEST (UTC+02:00)	Pelaić 69'; Đalović 73'	Report		Stadium: Stadion Kranjčevićeva; Attendance: 2,000; Referee: Draženko Kovačić (Križevci)

6 November 2004 14	Hajduk Split	2–0	Međimurje	Split
16:00 CET (UTC+01:00)	Grgurović 14'; Blatnjak 73' (pen.)	Report		Stadium: Stadion Poljud; Attendance: 2,000; Referee: Igor Pristovnik (Zagreb)

13 November 2004 15	Kamen Ingrad	2–1	Hajduk Split	Velika
16:00 CET (UTC+01:00)	Lišnić 41'; Šaranović 80'; Rendulić (red card) 90'	Report	Blatnjak 86' (pen.); Žilić (red card) 90'	Stadium: Stadion Kamen Ingrad; Attendance: 2,500; Referee: Marin Mlinar (Zagreb)

20 November 2004 16	Hajduk Split	2–1	Slaven Belupo	Split
16:00 CET (UTC+01:00)	Dragičević 76'; Bušić 90+3'	Report	Posavec (yellow card) 11' (yellow-red card) 48'; Damjanović 37' (o.g.); Karabogdan (yellow card) 81' (red card) 81'	Stadium: Stadion Poljud; Attendance: 3,000; Referee: Darko Feljan (Zagreb)

27 November 2004 17	Zadar	1–3	Hajduk Split	Zadar
13:30 CET (UTC+01:00)	Barnjak 77'	Report	Blatnjak 2', 12'; Bušić 23'	Stadium: Stadion Stanovi; Attendance: 2,500; Referee: Šime Vukić (Rijeka)

5 December 2004 18	Hajduk Split	1–0	Dinamo Zagreb	Split
17:00 CET (UTC+01:00)	Bušić 88'	Report		Stadium: Stadion Poljud; Attendance: 25,000; Referee: Vlado Svilokos (Sisak)

26 February 2005 19	Osijek	2–2	Hajduk Split	Osijek
20:15 CET (UTC+01:00)	Ostopanj (yellow card) 41' (yellow-red card) 48'; Primorac 34'; Jukić 43'	Report	Vejić 17'; Bušić 59'	Stadium: Stadion Gradski vrt Attendance: 7,000; Referee: Marin Mlinar (Zagreb)

5 March 2005 20	Hajduk Split	3–1	Varteks	Split
17:15 CET (UTC+01:00)	Leko 10'; Bušić 26'; Rački 85'	Report	Halilović 90+6'	Stadium: Stadion Poljud; Attendance: 20,000; Referee: Ivan Bebek (Rijeka)

12 March 2005 21	Rijeka	2–0	Hajduk Split	Rijeka
17:15 CET (UTC+01:00)	Lérant 39'; Mujdža 86'	Report		Stadium: Stadion Kantrida; Attendance: 7,000; Referee: Marijo Strahonja (Zagreb)

19 March 2005 22	Hajduk Split	2–0	Inter Zaprešić	Split
15:00 CET (UTC+01:00)	Lovrek 30'; Dragičević 71'	Report		Stadium: Stadion Poljud; Attendance: 9,000; Referee: Željko Širić (Osijek)

Source: HRnogomet.com

==== Championship play-off ====
2 April 2005 23	Hajduk Split	0–1	NK Zagreb	Split
17:45 CEST (UTC+02:00)		Report	Vidović (yellow card) 28' (red card) 89' (goal) 82'	Stadium: Stadion Poljud; Attendance: 7,000; Referee: Damir Batinić (Osijek)

9 April 2005 24	Hajduk Split	1–1	Rijeka	Split
17:45 CEST (UTC+02:00)	Munhoz 35'	Report	Novaković 90'	Stadium: Stadion Poljud; Attendance: 15,000; Referee: Marijo Strahonja (Zagreb)

16 April 2005 25	Slaven Belupo	1–1	Hajduk Split	Koprivnica
14:00 CEST (UTC+02:00)	Karabogdan 49'; Višković (yellow card) 61' (yellow-red card) 74'	Report	Bušić 87' (pen.)	Stadium: Gradski stadion Attendance: 4,000; Referee: Nikola Petir (Kašina)

23 April 2005 26	Hajduk Split	5–1	Inter Zaprešić	Split
17:45 CEST (UTC+02:00)	Leko 56' (pen.); Bušić 63'; Kranjčar 68'; Turković 71'; Rački 83'	Report	Zekić 27'; Vidak (red card) 41'	Stadium: Stadion Poljud; Attendance: 7,000; Referee: Marin Mlinar (Zagreb)

30 April 2005 27	Varteks	1–2	Hajduk Split	Varaždin
18:00 CEST (UTC+02:00)	Šafarić 87'	Report	Bartulović 43'; Munhoz 75'	Stadium: Stadion Varteks; Attendance: 5,000; Referee: Alen Gerek (Zabok)

7 May 2005 28	NK Zagreb	3–2	Hajduk Split	Zagreb
15:00 CEST (UTC+02:00)	Bartolović 25', 90'; Vidović 58'	Report	Bartulović (yellow card) 35' (yellow-red card) 57'; Leko 44'; Čačić 82'	Stadium: Stadion Kranjčevićeva; Attendance: 5,000; Referee: Ivan Bebek (Rijeka)

14 May 2005 29	Rijeka	1–1	Hajduk Split	Rijeka
20:15 CEST (UTC+02:00)	Erceg 41'	Report	Dragičević 37'	Stadium: Stadion Kantrida; Attendance: 7,000; Referee: Ante Vučemilović-Šimunović (Osijek)

18 May 2005 30	Hajduk Split	0–0	Slaven Belupo	Split
17:00 CEST (UTC+02:00)		Report		Stadium: Stadion Poljud; Attendance: 6,000; Referee: Alen Gerek (Zabok)

21 May 2005 31	Inter Zaprešić	1–1	Hajduk Split	Zaprešić
17:00 CEST (UTC+02:00)	Skulić (yellow card) 77' (yellow-red card) 87'; Gulić 90+2'	Report	Blatnjak 69'	Stadium: Stadion ŠRC Zaprešić; Attendance: 7,000; Referee: Ivan Bebek (Rijeka)

28 May 2005 32	Hajduk Split	6–0	Varteks	Split
17:00 CEST (UTC+02:00)	Vejić 1'; Biščević 11'; Bušić 20'; Čačić 22'; Lovrek 69'; Kranjčar 76'	Report		Stadium: Stadion Poljud; Attendance: 25,000; Referee: Željko Širić (Osijek)

Source: HRnogomet.com

=== Croatian Football Cup ===
22 September 2004 R1	Vinogradar	2–4 (a.e.t.)	Hajduk Split	Jastrebarsko
16:00 CEST (UTC+02:00)	Lovreković 24'; Bucković 88'	Report	Blatnjak 11'; Neretljak 30'; Čačić 94'; Bušić 117'	Stadium: SC Mladina; Attendance: 1,500; Referee: Igor Pristovnik (Zagreb)

27 October 2004 R2	Nehaj	2–3	Hajduk Split	Senj
15:00 CEST (UTC+02:00)	Rudelić 58'; Tomljanović 61'	Report	Blatnjak 47'; Miladin 58'; Turković 68'	Stadium: Stadion pod Nehajem; Attendance: 3,500; Referee: Mauro Tomišić (Pazin)

8 March 2005 QF	NK Zagreb	1–0	Hajduk Split	Zagreb
15:00 CET (UTC+01:00)	Klić 89'	Report		Stadium: Stadion Kranjčevićeva; Attendance: 3,500; Referee: Ante Vučemilović-Šimunović (Osijek)

15 March 2005 QF	Hajduk Split	2–0 (2–1 agg.)	NK Zagreb	Split
16:00 CET (UTC+01:00)	Leko 75' (pen.); Vejić 90+3'	Report		Stadium: Stadion Poljud; Attendance: 5,000; Referee: Hrvoje Kurtović (Osijek)

20 April 2005 SF	Hajduk Split	2–1	Osijek	Split
17:30 CEST (UTC+02:00)	Đolonga (yellow card) 35' (red card) 74'; Gusić 67' (o.g.); Turković 72'	Report	Jukić 55'; Babić (red card) 74'	Stadium: Stadion Poljud; Attendance: 4,000; Referee: Draženko Kovačić (Križevci)

27 April 2005 SF	Osijek	1–1 (2–3 agg.)	Hajduk Split	Osijek
18:00 CEST (UTC+02:00)	Gusić (red card) 45'; Jukić 51'	Report	Leko 45'	Stadium: Stadion Gradski vrt Attendance: 8,000; Referee: Marijo Strahonja (Zagreb)

11 May 2005 Final	Rijeka	2–1	Hajduk Split	Rijeka
20:45 CEST (UTC+02:00)	Mitu 58'; Erceg 61'	Report	Đolonga 22'	Stadium: Stadion Kantrida; Attendance: 7,000; Referee: Ivan Novak (Varaždin)

25 May 2005 Final	Hajduk Split	0–1 (1–3 agg.)	Rijeka	Split
17:30 CEST (UTC+02:00)		Report	Mitu 80'	Stadium: Stadion Poljud; Attendance: 20,000; Referee: Marijo Strahonja (Zagreb)

Source: HRnogomet.com

=== Champions League ===
==== Second qualifying round ====
28 July 2004 First leg	Hajduk Split (Croatia)	3–2	(Republic of Ireland) Shelbourne	Split, Croatia
20:30 CEST (UTC+02:00)	Blatnjak 18', 85'; Šuto 48'	Report	Fitzpatrick 5'; Moore 89'	Stadium: Stadion Poljud; Attendance: 20,000; Referee: Viktor Kassai (Hungary)

4 August 2004 Second leg	Shelbourne (Republic of Ireland)	2–0 (4–3 agg.)	(Croatia) Hajduk Split	Dublin, Republic of Ireland
19:00 WEST (UTC+01:00)	Rogers 78'; Moore 90'	Report		Stadium: Tolka Park; Attendance: 10,000; Referee: Stanislav Sukhina (Russia)

Source: uefa.com

== Player seasonal records ==
=== Top scorers ===
Rank	Name	League	Europe	Cup	Supercup	Total
1	(Bosnia and Herzegovina) Dragan Blatnjak	9	2	2	1	14
2	(Croatia) Tomislav Bušić	11	–	1	–	12
3	(Bosnia and Herzegovina) Almir Turković	4	–	2	–	6
4	(Croatia) Frane Čačić	4	–	1	–	5
4	(Croatia) Mate Dragičević	5	–	–	–	5
4	(Croatia) Ivan Leko	3	–	2	–	5
7	(Croatia) Hrvoje Vejić	4	–	–	–	4
8	(Uruguay) Pablo Munhoz	3	–	–	–	3
9	(Croatia) Mario Grgurović	2	–	–	–	2
9	(Croatia) Niko Kranjčar	2	–	–	–	2
9	(Croatia) Krunoslav Lovrek	2	–	–	–	2
9	(Croatia) Mato Neretljak	1	–	1	–	2
9	(Croatia) Natko Rački	2	–	–	–	2
14	(Croatia) Mladen Bartulović	1	–	–	–	1
14	(Bosnia and Herzegovina) Bulend Biščević	1	–	–	–	1
14	(Bosnia and Herzegovina) Dario Damjanović	1	–	–	–	1
14	(Croatia) Vlatko Đolonga	–	–	1	–	1
14	(Croatia) Tvrtko Kale	1	–	–	–	1
14	(Croatia) Darko Miladin	–	–	1	–	1
14	(Croatia) Nenad Pralija	1	–	–	–	1
14	(Croatia) Petar Šuto	–	1	–	–	1
14	(Croatia) Tonči Žilić	1	–	–	–	1
	Own goals	1	–	1	–	2
	TOTALS	58	2	13	1	74

Source: Competitive matches

== See also ==
- 2004–05 Croatian First Football League
- 2004–05 Croatian Football Cup

== External sources ==
- 2004–05 Prva HNL at HRnogomet.com
- 2004–05 Croatian Cup at HRnogomet.com
- 2004–05 UEFA Champions League at rsssf.com
