= 2005–06 HNK Hajduk Split season =

Hajduk Split
2005–06 season
- Chairman: Branko Grgić
- Manager: Miroslav Blažević (until 18 September 2005); Ivan Gudelj (from 19 September 2005 to 13 February 2006); Luka Bonačić
- Prva HNL: 5th
- Croatian Cup: Semi-finals
- Champions League: Second qualifying round
- Croatian Supercup: Winners
- Top goalscorer: League: Niko Kranjčar (10); All: Niko Kranjčar (14)
- Highest home attendance: 25,000 vs Debrecen (3 August 2005)
- Lowest home attendance: 0 vs Inter Zaprešić (25 February 2006)
- Average home league attendance: 5,188
Home colours	Away colours

The 2005–06 season was the 95th season in Hajduk Split’s history and their fifteenth in the Prva HNL. Their 1st place finish in the 2004–05 season meant it was their 15th successive season playing in the Prva HNL.

== First-team squad ==
Squad at end of season

Note: Flags indicate national team as defined under FIFA eligibility rules; some limited exceptions apply. Players may hold more than one non-FIFA nationality.

No.	Pos.	Nation	Player
1	GK	CRO	Stipe Pletikosa (on loan from Shakhtar Donetsk)
2	DF	CRO	Petar Šuto
3	DF	MKD	Igor Kralevski
4	MF	BIH	Dario Damjanović
5	DF	CRO	Jurica Buljat
6	DF	CRO	Vlatko Đolonga
7	DF	CRO	Filip Marčić
8	FW	BIH	Dragan Blatnjak
9	FW	CRO	Tomislav Erceg
10	MF	CRO	Niko Kranjčar
11	FW	CRO	Zvonimir Deranja
11	FW	CRO	Nikola Kalinić
12	GK	CRO	Vladimir Balić
13	MF	CRO	Mladen Bartulović

No.	Pos.	Nation	Player
14	FW	SVN	Sebastjan Cimirotič (on loan from Incheon United)
15	MF	CRO	Mate Selak
16	FW	CRO	Krešimir Makarin
17	DF	CRO	Tonči Žilić
18	MF	BIH	Mirko Hrgović
20	MF	CRO	Ivan Režić
21	DF	CRO	Darko Miladin
22	DF	BIH	Josip Ćutuk
23	FW	CRO	Nikica Jelavić
24	MF	CRO	Mario Grgurović
26	MF	URU	Pablo Munhoz
27	DF	CRO	Igor Gal
29	MF	CRO	Danijel Hrman
30	FW	CRO	Tomislav Bušić

=== Left club during season ===
Note: Flags indicate national team as defined under FIFA eligibility rules; some limited exceptions apply. Players may hold more than one non-FIFA nationality.

No.	Pos.	Nation	Player
4	MF	CRO	Frane Čačić (released)
9	FW	CRO	Mate Dragičević (released)
15	MF	CRO	Nenad Pralija (to Trogir)
18	DF	CRO	Goran Granić (released)

No.	Pos.	Nation	Player
19	GK	CRO	Tvrtko Kale (to Neuchâtel Xamax)
21	MF	BIH	Bulend Biščević (to Zrinjski Mostar)
27	DF	CRO	Luka Vučko (to Saturn Ramenskoye)

== Competitions ==
=== Overall record ===
Performance by competition
Competition	Starting round	Final position/round	First match	Last match
Prva HNL	—N/a	5th	20 July 2005	13 May 2006
Croatian Football Cup	First round	Semi-final	21 September 2005	5 April 2006
Super Cup	—N/a	Winners	15 July 2005	
UEFA Champions League	Second qualifying round		28 July 2005	3 August 2005

Statistics by competition
Competition	Pld	W	D	L	GF	GA	GD	Win%
Prva HNL	32	10	10	12	40	35	+5	31.25
Croatian Football Cup	6	3	2	1	9	5	+4	50.00
Super Cup	1	1	0	0	1	0	+1	100.00
UEFA Champions League	2	0	0	2	0	8	−8	0.00
Total	41	14	12	15	50	48	+2	34.15

=== Prva HNL ===
==== First stage ====
Pos	Team	Pld	W	D	L	GF	GA	GD	Pts	Qualification
3	Osijek	22	10	4	8	25	32	−7	34	Qualification to championship group
4	Varteks	22	10	1	11	34	35	−1	31	Qualification to championship group
5	Hajduk Split	22	7	8	7	28	21	+7	29	Qualification to championship group
6	Kamen Ingrad	22	8	5	9	26	30	−4	29	Qualification to championship group
7	Pula Staro Češko	22	8	4	10	29	26	+3	28	Qualification to relegation group

Source: RSSSF.org
Rules for classification: 1st points; 2nd head-to-head points; 3rd head-to-head goal difference; 4th head-to-head away goals scored

==== Second stage (championship play-off) ====
Pos	Team	Pld	W	D	L	GF	GA	GD	Pts	Qualification
1	Dinamo Zagreb (C)	32	24	4	4	78	21	+57	76	Qualification to Champions League second qualifying round
2	Rijeka	32	20	5	7	61	36	+25	65	Qualification to UEFA Cup first qualifying round
3	Varteks	32	15	2	15	51	48	+3	47	Qualification to UEFA Cup first qualifying round
4	Osijek	32	13	5	14	31	48	−17	44	Qualification to Intertoto Cup second round
5	Hajduk Split	32	10	10	12	40	35	+5	40	
6	Kamen Ingrad	32	11	5	16	33	47	−14	38	

Source: RSSSF.org
Rules for classification: 1st points; 2nd head-to-head points; 3rd head-to-head goal difference; 4th head-to-head away goals scored
(C) Champions

==== Results summary ====
Overall								Home						Away					
Pld	W	D	L	GF	GA	GD	Pts	W	D	L	GF	GA	GD	W	D	L	GF	GA	GD
32	10	10	12	40	35	+5	40	8	4	4	30	18	+12	2	6	8	10	17	−7

Last updated: 13 May 2006.
Source: Sportnet.hr

==== Results by round ====
Round	1	2	3	4	5	6	7	8	9	10	11	12	13	14	15	16	17	18	19	20	21	22	23	24	25	26	27	28	29	30	31	32
Ground	H	H	A	H	A	H	A	H	A	H	A	A	A	H	A	H	A	H	A	H	A	H	A	H	A	A	H	H	A	H	H	A
Result	W	W	L	W	L	D	D	L	D	W	D	D	W	L	D	D	L	L	L	W	W	D	D	W	L	L	W	L	L	D	W	L
Position	1	1	2	3	3	4	4	6	7	5	4	5	4	5	5	6	7	8	9	8	5	5	5	5	5	5	5	5	5	5	5	5

Source: Competitive matches
A = Away; H = Home; W = Win; D = Draw; L = Loss

==== Results by opponent ====
Team	1–22		23–32		Points
Team	1	2	1	2	Points
Cibalia	1–1	0–1	—	—	1
Dinamo Zagreb	0–0	0–1	1–0	0–1	4
Inter Zaprešić	1–1	2–0	—	—	4
Kamen Ingrad	1–2	1–2	0–1	4–1	3
Međimurje	1–0	1–1	—	—	4
Osijek	6–0	1–1	3–0	1–2	7
Pula Staro Češko	0–2	1–1	—	—	1
Rijeka	0–1	0–1	1–1	0–4	1
Slaven Belupo	0–0	1–1	—	—	2
Varteks	3–0	1–0	0–2	2–2	7
NK Zagreb	3–1	2–1	—	—	6

Source: 2005–06 Croatian First Football League article

== Matches ==
=== Croatian Football Super Cup ===
17 July 2005 Final	Hajduk Split	1–0 (a.e.t.)	Rijeka	Split
21:00 CEST (UTC+02:00)	Kranjčar 103'	Report		Stadium: Stadion Poljud; Attendance: 18,000; Referee: Željko Širić (Osijek)

Source: HRnogomet.com

=== Prva HNL ===
==== First stage ====
20 July 2005 1	Hajduk Split	6–0	Osijek	Split
20:00 CEST (UTC+02:00)	Biščević 9'; Bartulović 17'; Bušić 28', 33'; Kranjčar 30'; Grgurović 69'	Report		Stadium: Stadion Poljud; Attendance: 10,000; Referee: Marijo Strahonja (Zagreb)

30 July 2005 2	Hajduk Split	3–1	NK Zagreb	Split
20:45 CEST (UTC+02:00)	Kranjčar 4', 90+3' (pen.); Bušić 84'	Report	Mandžukić 83'; Brnas (yellow card) 58' (yellow-red card) 90'	Stadium: Stadion Poljud; Attendance: 4,000; Referee: Ivan Bebek (Rijeka)

6 August 2005 3	Kamen Ingrad	2–1	Hajduk Split	Velika
20:00 CEST (UTC+02:00)	Lakić 15'; Brajković 52'	Report	Šuto 53'	Stadium: Stadion Kamen Ingrad; Attendance: 6,500; Referee: Marijo Strahonja (Zagreb)

13 August 2005 4	Hajduk Split	1–0	Međimurje	Split
20:00 CEST (UTC+02:00)	Kranjčar 24' (pen.)	Report		Stadium: Stadion Poljud; Attendance: 3,000; Referee: Damir Batinić (Osijek)

20 August 2005 5	Pula Staro Češko	2–0	Hajduk Split	Pula
17:00 CEST (UTC+02:00)	Šehić 50'; Rivić 78'	Report		Stadium: Stadion Veruda; Attendance: 4,000; Referee: Ante Vučemilović-Šimunović (Osijek)

27 August 2005 6	Hajduk Split	1–1	Cibalia	Split
19:00 CEST (UTC+02:00)	Makarin 88'	Report	Ratković 65'	Stadium: Stadion Poljud; Attendance: 3,000; Referee: Igor Pristovnik (Zagreb)

11 September 2005 7	Dinamo Zagreb	0–0	Hajduk Split	Zagreb
20:15 CEST (UTC+02:00)		Report		Stadium: Stadion Maksimir; Attendance: 35,000; Referee: Željko Širić (Osijek)

17 September 2005 8	Hajduk Split	0–1	Rijeka	Split
19:00 CEST (UTC+02:00)		Report	Sharbini 15'	Stadium: Stadion Poljud; Attendance: 14,000; Referee: Vlado Svilokos (Sisak)

24 September 2005 9	Inter Zaprešić	2–2	Hajduk Split	Zaprešić
16:00 CEST (UTC+02:00)	Ješe 9'; Gulić 24'	Report	Vučko 83'; Kranjčar 88' (pen.); Biščević (yellow card) 37' (yellow-red card) 90'	Stadium: Stadion ŠRC Zaprešić; Attendance: 3,000; Referee: Ante Vučemilović-Šimunović (Osijek)

1 October 2005 10	Hajduk Split	3–0	Varteks	Split
20:15 CEST (UTC+02:00)	Bušić 27'; Blatnjak 57'; Deranja 87'	Report		Stadium: Stadion Poljud; Attendance: 2,000; Referee: Željko Širić (Osijek)

15 October 2005 11	Slaven Belupo	0–0	Hajduk Split	Koprivnica
15:30 CEST (UTC+02:00)		Report		Stadium: Gradski stadion Attendance: 3,000; Referee: Alen Gerek (Zabok)

22 October 2005 12	Osijek	1–1	Hajduk Split	Osijek
20:15 CEST (UTC+02:00)	Balatinac 36'	Report	Kranjčar 22'	Stadium: Stadion Gradski vrt Attendance: 7,000; Referee: Domagoj Vučkov (Rijeka)

26 October 2005 13	NK Zagreb	1–2	Hajduk Split	Zagreb
15:00 CEST (UTC+02:00)	Labudović (yellow card) 64' (yellow-red card) 66'; Pelaić 71'	Report	Marčić 12'; Kralevski (yellow card) 32' (yellow-red card) 53'; Vučko 76'	Stadium: Stadion Kranjčevićeva; Attendance: 4,000; Referee: Igor Križarić (Čakovec)

29 October 2005 14	Hajduk Split	1–2	Kamen Ingrad	Split
17:00 CEST (UTC+02:00)	Đolonga 36'	Report	Papa 64'; Lakić 76'	Stadium: Stadion Poljud; Attendance: 3,500; Referee: Marin Mlinar (Zagreb)

5 November 2005 15	Međimurje	1–1	Hajduk Split	Čakovec
14:00 CET (UTC+01:00)	Kresinger 69'	Report	Blatnjak 4'	Stadium: Stadion SRC Mladost; Attendance: 4,000; Referee: Ivan Bebek (Rijeka)

19 November 2005 16	Hajduk Split	1–1	Pula Staro Češko	Split
16:00 CET (UTC+01:00)	Kranjčar 10' (pen.)	Report	Šehić 74'	Stadium: Stadion Poljud; Attendance: 1,500; Referee: Draženko Kovačić (Križevci)

26 November 2005 17	Cibalia	1–0	Hajduk Split	Vinkovci
13:30 CET (UTC+01:00)	Žgela 56'	Report	Marčić (yellow card) 59' (yellow-red card) 62'	Stadium: Stadion HNK Cibalia; Attendance: 3,000; Referee: Igor Križarić (Čakovec)

12 February 2006 18	Hajduk Split	0–1	Dinamo Zagreb	Split
20:15 CET (UTC+01:00)		Report	Modrić 61'	Stadium: Stadion Poljud; Attendance: 20,000; Referee: Draženko Kovačić (Križevci)
Note: The match was originally scheduled on 3 December 2005, but was postponed to 12 February 2006 due to the flooded pitch.

18 February 2006 19	Rijeka	1–0	Hajduk Split	Rijeka
20:15 CET (UTC+01:00)	Novaković 89'	Report		Stadium: Stadion Kantrida; Attendance: 8,000; Referee: Željko Širić (Osijek)

25 February 2006 20	Hajduk Split	3–2	Inter Zaprešić	Split
16:00 CET (UTC+01:00)	Đolonga 9'; Erceg 31'; Kranjčar 69' (pen.)	Report	Gondžić 81'; Karić 87'; Jerneić (red card) 90'	Stadium: Stadion Poljud; Attendance: 0 Referee: Ante Vučemilović-Šimunović (Osijek)

4 March 2006 21	Varteks	0–1	Hajduk Split	Varaždin
20:15 CET (UTC+01:00)		Report	Blatnjak 10'	Stadium: Stadion Varteks; Attendance: 5,000; Referee: Ivan Bebek (Rijeka)

11 March 2006 22	Hajduk Split	1–1	Slaven Belupo	Split
15:00 CET (UTC+01:00)	Hrgović 31'	Report	Mumlek 52' (pen.)	Stadium: Stadion Poljud; Attendance: 4,000; Referee: Domagoj Vučkov (Rijeka)

Source: HRnogomet.com

==== Championship play-off ====
18 March 2006 23	Rijeka	1–1	Hajduk Split	Rijeka
20:15 CET (UTC+01:00)	Vugrinec 75' (pen.)	Report	Hrgović 90'	Stadium: Stadion Kantrida; Attendance: 7,000; Referee: Damir Batinić (Osijek)

25 March 2006 24	Hajduk Split	3–0	Osijek	Split
17:00 CET (UTC+01:00)	Jelavić 62', 67'; Kranjčar 69'	Report		Stadium: Stadion Poljud; Attendance: 5,000; Referee: Igor Križarić (Čakovec)

1 April 2006 25	Varteks	2–0	Hajduk Split	Varaždin
18:00 CEST (UTC+02:00)	Ipša 12', 22'	Report		Stadium: Stadion Varteks; Attendance: 5,000; Referee: Nikola Petir (Kašina)

8 April 2006 26	Kamen Ingrad	1–0	Hajduk Split	Velika
18:00 CEST (UTC+02:00)	Lakić 87'	Report	Munhoz (red card) 79'	Stadium: Stadion Kamen Ingrad; Attendance: 3,000; Referee: Zlatko Šimčić (Koprivnica)

15 April 2006 27	Hajduk Split	1–0	Dinamo Zagreb	Split
20:15 CEST (UTC+02:00)	Cimirotič 49'; Miladin (yellow card) 62' (yellow-red card) 88'	Report	Anderson (red card) 80'	Stadium: Stadion Poljud; Attendance: 8,000; Referee: Draženko Kovačić (Križevci)

22 April 2006 28	Hajduk Split	0–4	Rijeka	Split
20:15 CEST (UTC+02:00)	Kralevski (yellow card) 30' (yellow-red card) 30'	Report	Vugrinec 31', 72', 83'; Sharbini 61'	Stadium: Stadion Poljud; Attendance: 3,000; Referee: Nikola Petir (Kašina)

29 April 2006 29	Osijek	2–1	Hajduk Split	Osijek
18:00 CEST (UTC+02:00)	Dinjar 39'; Barišić 79'	Report	Hrgović 47'	Stadium: Stadion Gradski vrt Attendance: 3,500; Referee: Marin Mlinar (Zagreb)

6 May 2006 30	Hajduk Split	2–2	Varteks	Split
17:00 CEST (UTC+02:00)	Bartulović 10'; Pokrivač 40' (o.g.)	Report	Ipša 57'; Šafarić 79' (pen.)	Stadium: Stadion Poljud; Attendance: 1,000; Referee: Damir Batinić (Osijek)

10 May 2006 31	Hajduk Split	4–1	Kamen Ingrad	Split
17:00 CEST (UTC+02:00)	Hrgović 5'; Kranjčar 19'; Bušić 44'; Jelavić 86'	Report	Parmaković 71'	Stadium: Stadion Poljud; Attendance: 1,000; Referee: Igor Križarić (Čakovec)

13 May 2006 32	Dinamo Zagreb	1–0	Hajduk Split	Zagreb
18:00 CEST (UTC+02:00)	Modrić 11'	Report		Stadium: Stadion Maksimir; Attendance: 30,000; Referee: Željko Širić (Osijek)

Source: HRnogomet.com

=== Croatian Football Cup ===
21 September 2005 R1	Hrvace	0–3	Hajduk Split	Hrvace
16:00 CEST (UTC+02:00)		Report	Blatnjak 13'; Miladin 48'; Bušić 68'	Stadium: Igralište NK Hrvace; Attendance: 4,000; Referee: Edo Trivković (Split)

18 October 2005 R2	Segesta	1–2 (a.e.t.)	Hajduk Split	Sisak
15:00 CEST (UTC+02:00)	Medarić 75'; Garba (yellow card) 74' (yellow-red card) 105'	Report	Čačić 15'; Grgurović 118'	Stadium: Gradski stadion Attendance: 4,000; Referee: Marijo Strahonja (Zagreb)

23 November 2005 QF	Osijek	1–1	Hajduk Split	Osijek
17:00 CET (UTC+01:00)	Vojnović 16'	Report	Marčić 40'; Kralevski (yellow card) 60' (red card) 83'	Stadium: Stadion Gradski vrt Attendance: 2,500; Referee: Vlado Svilokos (Sisak)

7 December 2005 QF	Hajduk Split	2–1 (3–2 agg.)	Osijek	Split
16:00 CET (UTC+01:00)	Kranjčar 9', 11' (pen.); Damjanović (yellow card) 32' (yellow-red card) 42'	Report	Balatinac 22'	Stadium: Stadion Poljud; Attendance: 1,500; Referee: Marijo Strahonja (Zagreb)

29 March 2006 SF	Hajduk Split	1–1	Rijeka	Split
17:30 CEST (UTC+02:00)	Kranjčar 21' (pen.)	Report	Vugrinec 55'	Stadium: Stadion Poljud; Attendance: 8,000; Referee: Željko Širić (Osijek)

5 April 2006 SF	Rijeka	1–0 (2–1 agg.)	Hajduk Split	Rijeka
17:30 CEST (UTC+02:00)	Novaković 23'	Report		Stadium: Stadion Kantrida; Attendance: 8,000; Referee: Draženko Kovačić (Križevci)

Source: HRnogomet.com

=== Champions League ===
==== Second qualifying round ====
27 July 2005 First leg	Debrecen (Hungary)	3–0	(Croatia) Hajduk Split	Debrecen, Hungary
20:45 CEST (UTC+02:00)	Bogdanović 26', 40'; Kerekes 58'	Report		Stadium: Stadion Oláh Gábor Út; Attendance: 8,000; Referee: Knut Kircher (Germany)

3 August 2005 Second leg	Hajduk Split (Croatia)	0–5 (0–8 agg.)	(Hungary) Debrecen	Split, Croatia
20:15 CEST (UTC+02:00)		Report	Halmosi 1', 27'; Kerekes 22'; Sidibe 76'; Kiss 90'	Stadium: Stadion Poljud; Attendance: 25,000; Referee: Richard Havrilla (Slovakia)

Source: uefa.com

== Player seasonal records ==
=== Top scorers ===
Rank	Name	League	Cup	Supercup	Total
1	(Croatia) Niko Kranjčar	10	3	1	14
2	(Croatia) Tomislav Bušić	5	1	–	6
3	(Bosnia and Herzegovina) Mirko Hrgović	4	–	–	4
3	(Bosnia and Herzegovina) Dragan Blatnjak	3	1	–	4
5	(Croatia) Nikica Jelavić	3	–	–	3
6	(Croatia) Mladen Bartulović	2	–	–	2
6	(Croatia) Vlatko Đolonga	2	–	–	2
6	(Croatia) Mario Grgurović	1	1	–	2
6	(Croatia) Filip Marčić	1	1	–	2
6	(Croatia) Luka Vučko	2	–	–	2
11	(Bosnia and Herzegovina) Bulend Biščević	1	–	–	1
11	(Slovenia) Sebastjan Cimirotič	1	–	–	1
11	(Croatia) Frane Čačić	–	1	–	1
11	(Croatia) Zvonimir Deranja	1	–	–	1
11	(Croatia) Tomislav Erceg	1	–	–	1
11	(Croatia) Krešimir Makarin	1	–	–	1
11	(Croatia) Darko Miladin	–	1	–	1
11	(Croatia) Petar Šuto	1	–	–	1
	Own goals	1	–	–	1
	TOTALS	70	9	1	79

Source: Competitive matches

== See also ==
- 2005–06 Croatian First Football League
- 2005–06 Croatian Football Cup

== External sources ==
- 2005–06 Prva HNL at HRnogomet.com
- 2005–06 Croatian Cup at HRnogomet.com
- 2005–06 UEFA Champions League at rsssf.com
