= 2003–04 HNK Hajduk Split season =

Hajduk Split
2003–04 season
- Chairman: Branko Grgić
- Manager: Zoran Vulić; Petar Nadoveza
- Prva HNL: 1st
- Croatian Cup: Quarter-finals
- UEFA Cup: Second round
- Croatian Supercup: Runners-up
- Top goalscorer: League: Petar Krpan (12); All: Petar Krpan (13)
- Highest home attendance: 40,000 vs Varteks (15 May 2004)
- Lowest home attendance: 1,000 vs Zadar (28 October 2003)
- Average home league attendance: 8,313

The 2003–04 season was the 93rd season in Hajduk Split’s history and their 13th in the Prva HNL. Their second place finish in the 2002–03 season meant it was their 13th successive season playing in the Prva HNL.

== First-team squad ==
Squad at end of season

Note: Flags indicate national team as defined under FIFA eligibility rules; some limited exceptions apply. Players may hold more than one non-FIFA nationality.

No.	Pos.	Nation	Player
1	GK	CRO	Hrvoje Sunara
2	DF	CRO	Tomislav Rukavina
3	DF	CRO	Andrija Balajić
4	MF	CRO	Frane Čačić
5	FW	BIH	Almir Turković
6	DF	CRO	Vlatko Đolonga
7	DF	CRO	Hrvoje Vejić
8	FW	BIH	Dragan Blatnjak
10	MF	CRO	Mario Carević
11	FW	CRO	Zvonimir Deranja
12	GK	CRO	Vladimir Balić
13	FW	CRO	Petar Krpan
14	MF	CRO	Srđan Andrić

No.	Pos.	Nation	Player
15	MF	CRO	Nenad Pralija
16	DF	CRO	Stjepan Skočibušić
17	DF	CRO	Hrvoje Vuković
18	FW	CRO	Nino Bule
20	MF	AUS	Goran Talevski
21	DF	CRO	Darko Miladin
22	DF	SVN	Suad Fileković
23	DF	CRO	Mato Neretljak
24	MF	CRO	Mario Grgurović
27	MF	SCO	Ryan Thomson
28	FW	CRO	Nikica Jelavić
29	FW	CRO	Natko Rački
—	MF	BRA	Matos de Oliveira

=== Left club during season ===
Note: Flags indicate national team as defined under FIFA eligibility rules; some limited exceptions apply. Players may hold more than one non-FIFA nationality.

No.	Pos.	Nation	Player
9	FW	SVN	Klemen Lavrič (to Inker Zaprešić)
20	MF	CRO	Dean Računica (retired)
22	MF	CRO	Ante Miše (to NK Mura)

No.	Pos.	Nation	Player
25	GK	CRO	Zlatko Runje (released)
31	DF	CRO	Tomislav Grčić (loaned to Mosor)

== Competitions ==
=== Overall record ===
Performance by competition
Competition	Starting round	Final position/round	First match	Last match
Prva HNL	—N/a	Winners	27 July 2003	15 May 2004
Croatian Football Cup	First round	Quarter-final	16 September 2003	23 March 2004
Super Cup	—N/a	Runners-up	20 July 2003	
UEFA Cup	Qualifying round	Second round	12 August 2003	27 November 2003

Statistics by competition
Competition	Pld	W	D	L	GF	GA	GD	Win%
Prva HNL	32	25	3	4	63	24	+39	78.13
Croatian Football Cup	4	2	1	1	5	2	+3	50.00
Super Cup	1	0	0	1	1	4	−3	0.00
UEFA Cup	6	1	3	2	4	4	+0	16.67
Total	43	28	7	8	74	34	+40	65.12

=== Prva HNL ===
==== First stage ====
Pos	Team	Pld	W	D	L	GF	GA	GD	Pts	Qualification
1	Hajduk Split	22	18	1	3	46	18	+28	55	Qualification to championship group
2	Dinamo Zagreb	22	15	5	2	47	16	+31	50	Qualification to championship group
3	Rijeka	22	8	7	7	26	25	+1	31	Qualification to championship group
4	Osijek	22	8	5	9	36	40	−4	29 (Note: Head-to-head record: Osijek–Varteks 3–1, Varteks–Osijek 1–1.)	Qualification to championship group
5	Varteks	22	7	8	7	21	25	−4	29	Qualification to championship group

Source: RSSSF.org
Rules for classification: 1) points; 2) goal difference; 3) number of goals scored.

==== Second stage (championship play-off) ====
Pos	Team	Pld	W	D	L	GF	GA	GD	Pts	Qualification
1	Hajduk Split (C)	32	25	3	4	63	24	+39	78	Qualification to Champions League second qualifying round
2	Dinamo Zagreb	32	23	7	2	77	25	+52	76	Qualification to UEFA Cup second qualifying round
3	Rijeka	32	11	9	12	36	41	−5	42	Qualification to UEFA Cup second qualifying round
4	Osijek	32	11	6	15	50	57	−7	39	
5	Varteks	32	9	11	12	33	42	−9	38	
6	Zadar	32	7	11	14	46	71	−25	32	

Source: RSSSF.org
Rules for classification: 1) points; 2) goal difference; 3) number of goals scored.
(C) Champions

==== Results summary ====
Overall								Home						Away					
Pld	W	D	L	GF	GA	GD	Pts	W	D	L	GF	GA	GD	W	D	L	GF	GA	GD
32	25	3	4	63	24	+39	78	14	1	1	39	9	+30	11	2	3	24	15	+9

Last updated: 15 May 2004.
Source: Sportnet.hr

==== Results by round ====
Round	1	2	3	4	5	6	7	8	9	10	11	12	13	14	15	16	17	18	19	20	21	22	23	24	25	26	27	28	29	30	31	32
Ground	H	A	H	A	H	A	H	A	H	A	H	A	H	A	H	A	H	A	H	A	H	A	H	H	A	H	A	A	A	H	A	H
Result	W	W	L	W	W	L	W	W	W	D	W	W	W	W	W	L	W	W	W	W	W	W	W	D	W	W	D	W	L	W	W	W
Position	3	2	5	2	2	2	2	2	2	2	2	2	2	2	1	2	1	1	1	1	1	1	1	1	1	1	1	1	2	1	1	1

Source: Competitive matches
A = Away; H = Home; W = Win; D = Draw; L = Loss

==== Results by opponent ====
Team	1–22		23–32		Points
Team	1	2	1	2	Points
Cibalia	3–2	3–2	—	—	6
Dinamo Zagreb	0–1	3–1	0–0	1–3	4
Inker Zaprešić	1–4	2–0	—	—	3
Kamen Ingrad	1–0	1–0	—	—	6
Marsonia	5–1	3–0	—	—	6
Osijek	2–0	3–2	2–0	1–0	12
Rijeka	2–1	4–0	1–0	2–0	12
Slaven Belupo	1–1	2–1	—	—	4
Varteks	2–0	0–2	0–0	2–0	7
Zadar	3–1	3–1	5–1	3–2	12
NK Zagreb	2–0	2–0	—	—	6

Source: 2003–04 Croatian First Football League article

== Matches ==
=== Croatian Football Super Cup ===
20 July 2003 Final	Dinamo Zagreb	4–1	Hajduk Split	Zagreb
20:00 CEST (UTC+02:00)	Tomić 30'; Sedloski 48'; Eduardo 75'; Zahora 90+2'	Report	Rukavina 23'	Stadium: Stadion Maksimir; Attendance: 7,000; Referee: Ivan Bebek (Rijeka)

Source: HRnogomet.com

=== Prva HNL ===
==== First stage ====
27 July 2003 1	Hajduk Split	2–0	NK Zagreb	Split
18:00 CEST (UTC+02:00)	Turković 33'; Blatnjak 62'	Report		Stadium: Stadion Poljud; Attendance: 4,500; Referee: Željko Širić (Osijek)

3 August 2003 2	Kamen Ingrad	0–1	Hajduk Split	Velika
20:15 CEST (UTC+02:00)		Report	Čačić 44'	Stadium: Stadion Kamen Ingrad; Attendance: 7,500; Referee: Željko Širić (Osijek)

8 August 2003 3	Hajduk Split	1–4	Inker Zaprešić	Split
20:00 CEST (UTC+02:00)	Krpan 67'	Report	Karabogdan 15', 45'; Lalić 61'; Katulić 90'	Stadium: Stadion Poljud; Attendance: 5,000; Referee: Vlado Svilokos (Sisak)

17 August 2003 4	Cibalia	2–3	Hajduk Split	Vinkovci
17:30 CEST (UTC+02:00)	Križanović 19', 45'	Report	Krpan 35', 75'; Blatnjak 90'	Stadium: Stadion HNK Cibalia; Attendance: 3,500; Referee: Ivan Bebek (Rijeka)

23 August 2003 5	Hajduk Split	2–0	Varteks	Split
17:15 CEST (UTC+02:00)	Krpan 26'; Rački 90'	Report	Kristić (red card) 75'	Stadium: Stadion Poljud; Attendance: 5,000; Referee: Vlado Svilokos (Sisak)

31 August 2003 6	Dinamo Zagreb	1–0	Hajduk Split	Zagreb
20:15 CEST (UTC+02:00)	Mitu 8'	Report		Stadium: Stadion Maksimir; Attendance: 15,000; Referee: Draženko Kovačić (Križevci)

13 September 2003 7	Hajduk Split	5–0	Marsonia	Split
18:00 CEST (UTC+02:00)	Đolonga 1'; Skočibušić 20'; Bule 28', 87'; Rački 66'	Report		Stadium: Stadion Poljud; Attendance: 2,000; Referee: Šime Vukić (Rijeka)

20 September 2003 8	Rijeka	1–2	Hajduk Split	Rijeka
20:15 CEST (UTC+02:00)	Klić 23'	Report	Bule 32', 52'	Stadium: Stadion Kantrida; Attendance: 7,000; Referee: Željko Širić (Osijek)

28 September 2003 9	Hajduk Split	2–0	Osijek	Split
18:00 CEST (UTC+02:00)	Blatnjak 42'; Bule 61'	Report		Stadium: Stadion Poljud; Attendance: 3,000; Referee: Draženko Kovačić (Križevci)

4 October 2003 10	Slaven Belupo	1–1	Hajduk Split	Koprivnica
13:30 CEST (UTC+02:00)	Landeka 3'	Report	Krpan 51'; Neretljak (yellow card) 66' (yellow-red card) 89'	Stadium: Gradski stadion Attendance: 3,500; Referee: Ivan Bebek (Rijeka)

18 October 2003 11	Hajduk Split	3–1	Zadar	Split
15:30 CEST (UTC+02:00)	Računica 28', 90'; Andrić 78'	Report	Brajković 12'	Stadium: Stadion Poljud; Attendance: 1,500; Referee: Hrvoje Kurtović (Osijek)

25 October 2003 12	NK Zagreb	0–2	Hajduk Split	Zagreb
13:30 CEST (UTC+02:00)	Popović (red card) 64'	Report	Bule 13'; Krpan 48'	Stadium: Stadion Kranjčevićeva; Attendance: 1,500; Referee: Draženko Kovačić (Križevci)

2 November 2003 13	Hajduk Split	1–0	Kamen Ingrad	Split
17:00 CET (UTC+01:00)	Računica 38'	Report		Stadium: Stadion Poljud; Attendance: 2,500; Referee: Ivan Novak (Varaždin)

8 November 2003 14	Inker Zaprešić	0–2	Hajduk Split	Zaprešić
14:00 CET (UTC+01:00)	Brnas (red card) 23'	Report	Bule 71'; Rački 83'	Stadium: Stadion ŠRC Zaprešić; Attendance: 4,000; Referee: Vlado Svilokos (Sisak)

22 November 2003 15	Hajduk Split	3–1	Cibalia	Split
14:00 CET (UTC+01:00)	Rački 41'; Krpan 52', 63'	Report	Ratković 86'	Stadium: Stadion Poljud; Attendance: 3,000; Referee: Ante Vučemilović-Šimunović (Osijek)

30 November 2003 16	Varteks	2–0	Hajduk Split	Varaždin
18:00 CET (UTC+01:00)	Šafarić 20'; Fumić (yellow card) 24' (yellow-red card) 64'; Benko 79'	Report	Miše (red card) 69'	Stadium: Stadion Varteks; Attendance: 4,000; Referee: Draženko Kovačić (Križevci)

6 December 2003 17	Hajduk Split	3–1	Dinamo Zagreb	Split
18:00 CET (UTC+01:00)	Računica 14'; Krpan 22'; Andrić 34'	Report	Cesar (yellow card) 6' (yellow-red card) 40'; Kranjčar 38'	Stadium: Stadion Poljud; Attendance: 20,000; Referee: Ivan Bebek (Rijeka)

21 February 2004 18	Marsonia	0–1	Hajduk Split	Slavonski Brod
15:00 CET (UTC+01:00)		Report	Turković 37'	Stadium: Gradski stadion uz Savu; Attendance: 5,000; Referee: Vlado Svilokos (Sisak)

28 February 2004 19	Hajduk Split	4–0	Rijeka	Split
15:00 CET (UTC+01:00)	Krpan 11'; Bule 13'; Turković 64'; Grgurović 88'	Report		Stadium: Stadion Poljud; Attendance: 4,500; Referee: Ivan Novak (Varaždin)

6 March 2004 20	Osijek	2–3	Hajduk Split	Osijek
17:30 CET (UTC+01:00)	Vukoja 61'; Špehar 86'	Report	Božinovski 52' (o.g.); Đolonga 70', 85'	Stadium: Stadion Gradski vrt Attendance: 7,000; Referee: Miroslav Vitković (Vinkovci)

13 March 2004 21	Hajduk Split	2–1	Slaven Belupo	Split
15:30 CET (UTC+01:00)	Rukavina (yellow card) 7' (yellow-red card) 84'; Vejić 40'; Đolonga 55'	Report	Vručina 28'	Stadium: Stadion Poljud; Attendance: 5,000; Referee: Ante Vučemilović-Šimunović (Osijek)

20 March 2004 22	Zadar	1–3	Hajduk Split	Zadar
15:30 CET (UTC+01:00)	Brajković 20' (pen.)	Report	Turković 37'; Rački 63'; Čačić 90+2'	Stadium: Stadion Stanovi; Attendance: 9,000; Referee: Šime Vukić (Rijeka)

Source: HRnogomet.com

==== Championship play-off ====
27 March 2004 23	Hajduk Split	5–1	Zadar	Split
18:00 CET (UTC+01:00)	Krpan 4', 26'; Fileković 15'; Turković 32'; Deranja 90' (pen.)	Report	Gudelj 72'; Talevski (red card) 80'	Stadium: Stadion Poljud; Attendance: 3,000; Referee: Darko Feljan (Zagreb)

3 April 2004 24	Hajduk Split	0–0	Dinamo Zagreb	Split
17:30 CEST (UTC+02:00)		Report		Stadium: Stadion Poljud; Attendance: 28,000; Referee: Vlado Svilokos (Sisak)

10 April 2004 25	Rijeka	0–1	Hajduk Split	Rijeka
18:30 CEST (UTC+02:00)		Report	Đolonga 51'; Bule (yellow card) 56' (yellow-red card) 88'	Stadium: Stadion Kantrida; Attendance: 5,000; Referee: Darko Feljan (Zagreb)

17 April 2004 26	Hajduk Split	2–0	Osijek	Split
16:30 CEST (UTC+02:00)	Đolonga 13'; Rački 55'	Report		Stadium: Stadion Poljud; Attendance: 2,000; Referee: Marijo Strahonja (Zagreb)

21 April 2004 27	Varteks	0–0	Hajduk Split	Varaždin
18:00 CEST (UTC+02:00)		Report	Vuković (yellow card) 52' (yellow-red card) 90'	Stadium: Stadion Varteks; Attendance: 5,000; Referee: Vlado Svilokos (Sisak)

24 April 2004 28	Zadar	2–3	Hajduk Split	Zadar
16:30 CEST (UTC+01:00)	Ćustić 34'; Grbeša 70'	Report	Pralija 32'; Bule 62'; Carević 76'	Stadium: Stadion Stanovi; Attendance: 4,000; Referee: Slavko Čulina (Zagreb)

1 May 2004 29	Dinamo Zagreb	3–1	Hajduk Split	Zagreb
20:15 CEST (UTC+02:00)	Strupar 24', 82'; Zahora 90+2'	Report	Pralija 68' (pen.)	Stadium: Stadion Maksimir; Attendance: 20,000; Referee: Draženko Kovačić (Križevci)

8 May 2004 30	Hajduk Split	2–0	Rijeka	Split
17:00 CEST (UTC+02:00)	Vejić 66'; Deranja 69'	Report		Stadium: Stadion Poljud; Attendance: 4,000; Referee: Željko Širić (Osijek)

12 May 2004 31	Osijek	0–1	Hajduk Split	Osijek
17:00 CEST (UTC+02:00)		Report	Neretljak 25'	Stadium: Stadion Gradski vrt Attendance: 10,000; Referee: Šime Vukić (Rijeka)

15 May 2004 32	Hajduk Split	2–0	Varteks	Split
17:00 CEST (UTC+02:00)	Vejić 34'; Deranja 73'	Report		Stadium: Stadion Poljud; Attendance: 40,000; Referee: Ivan Bebek (Rijeka)

Source: HRnogomet.com

=== Croatian Football Cup ===
16 September 2003 R1	Primorac Biograd na Moru	0–2	Hajduk Split	Biograd na Moru
16:00 CEST (UTC+02:00)		Report	Lavrič 30'; Čačić 49'	Stadium: Stadion Kažimira i Silvia; Attendance: 2,000; Referee: Domagoj Vučkov (Rijeka)

28 October 2003 R2	Hajduk Split	3–1	Zadar	Split
18:00 CET (UTC+01:00)	Rački 28', 76', 88'	Report	Surać 53'	Stadium: Stadion Poljud; Attendance: 1,000; Referee: Nikola Petir (Kašina)

17 March 2004 QF	Cibalia	0–0	Hajduk Split	Vinkovci
14:30 CET (UTC+01:00)		Report		Stadium: Stadion HNK Cibalia; Attendance: 5,000; Referee: Željko Širić (Osijek)

24 March 2004 QF	Hajduk Split	0–1 (0–1 agg.)	Cibalia	Split
15:30 CET (UTC+01:00)		Report	Križanović 8'	Stadium: Stadion Poljud; Attendance: 1,000; Referee: Vlado Svilokos (Sisak)

Source: HRnogomet.com

=== UEFA Cup ===
==== Qualifying round ====
12 August 2003 First leg	Haka (Finland)	2–1	(Croatia) Hajduk Split	Valkeakoski, Finland
18:05 EEST (UTC+03:00)	Popovitch 14'; Ristilä 42'	Report	Krpan 2'	Stadium: Tehtaan kenttä Attendance: 2,000; Referee: Eric Blareau (Belgium)

26 August 2003 Second leg	Hajduk Split (Croatia)	1–0 (2a–2 agg.)	(Finland) Haka	Split, Croatia
20:15 CEST (UTC+02:00)	Računica 9'	Report		Stadium: Stadion Poljud; Attendance: 20,000; Referee: Antonio Manuel Almeida Costa (Portugal)

==== First round ====
24 September 2003 First leg	Grasshoppers (Switzerland)	1–1	(Croatia) Hajduk Split	Zürich, Switzerland
19:30 CEST (UTC+02:00)	Eduardo 40'	Report	Neretljak 56'	Stadium: Hardturm; Attendance: 8,100; Referee: Alan Kelly (Republic of Ireland)

15 October 2003 Second leg	Hajduk Split (Croatia)	0–0 (1a–1 agg.)	(Switzerland) Grasshoppers	Split, Croatia
17:30 CEST (UTC+02:00)		Report		Stadium: Stadion Poljud; Attendance: 20,000; Referee: Ruud Bossen (Netherlands)

==== Second round ====
6 November 2003 First leg	Roma (Italy)	1–0	(Croatia) Hajduk Split	Rome, Italy
21:00 CET (UTC+01:00)	Cassano 90+1'	Report		Stadium: Stadio Olimpico; Attendance: 31,000; Referee: Luis Medina Cantalejo (Spain)

27 November 2003 Second leg	Hajduk Split (Croatia)	1–1 (1–2 agg.)	(Italy) Roma	Split, Croatia
20:45 CET (UTC+01:00)	Bule 33'	Report	Cassano 85'	Stadium: Stadion Poljud; Attendance: 35,000; Referee: Stuart Dougal (Scotland)

Source: uefa.com

== Player seasonal records ==
=== Top scorers ===
Rank	Name	League	Europe	Cup	Supercup	Total
1	(Croatia) Petar Krpan	12	1	–	–	13
2	(Croatia) Nino Bule	9	1	–	–	10
3	(Croatia) Natko Rački	6	–	3	–	9
4	(Croatia) Vlatko Đolonga	6	–	–	–	6
5	(Croatia) Dean Računica	4	1	–	–	5
5	(Bosnia and Herzegovina) Almir Turković	5	–	–	–	5
7	(Croatia) Dragan Blatnjak	3	–	–	–	3
7	(Croatia) Frane Čačić	2	–	1	–	3
7	(Croatia) Zvonimir Deranja	3	–	–	–	3
7	(Croatia) Hrvoje Vejić	3	–	–	–	3
11	(Croatia) Srđan Andrić	2	–	–	–	2
11	(Croatia) Nenad Pralija	2	–	–	–	2
11	(Croatia) Mario Carević	2	–	–	–	2
14	(Slovenia) Suad Fileković	1	–	–	–	1
14	(Croatia) Mario Grgurović	1	–	–	–	1
14	(Slovenia) Klemen Lavrič	–	–	1	–	1
14	(Croatia) Mato Neretljak	1	1	–	–	1
14	(Croatia) Tomislav Rukavina	–	–	–	1	1
14	(Croatia) Stjepan Skočibušić	1	–	–	–	1
	Own goals	1	–	–	–	1
	TOTALS	63	5	4	1	75

Source: Competitive matches

== See also ==
- 2003–04 Croatian First Football League
- 2003–04 Croatian Football Cup

== External sources ==
- 2003–04 Prva HNL at HRnogomet.com
- 2003–04 Croatian Cup at HRnogomet.com
- 2003–04 UEFA Cup at rsssf.com
