= 2005 Croatian Football Cup final =

- Event: 2004–05 Croatian Cup
Rijeka	Hajduk Split
3	1

First leg
Rijeka	Hajduk Split
2	1
- Date: 11 May 2005
- Venue: Stadion Kantrida, Rijeka
- Man of the Match: Tomislav Erceg (Rijeka)
- Referee: Ivan Novak (Varaždin)
- Attendance: 7,000
- Weather: Clear

Second leg
Hajduk Split	Rijeka
0	1
- Date: 25 May 2005
- Venue: Stadion Poljud, Split
- Man of the Match: Dumitru Mitu (Rijeka)
- Referee: Marijo Strahonja (Zagreb)
- Attendance: 20,000
- Weather: Clear

The 2005 Croatian Cup final was a two-legged affair played between the Adriatic rivals Rijeka and Hajduk Split. The first leg was played in Rijeka on 11 May 2005, while the second leg on 25 May 2005 in Split.

Rijeka won the trophy with an aggregate result of 3–1.

== Road to the final ==
Rijeka		Round	Hajduk Split	
Opponent	Result		Opponent	Result
Rudeš	2–1	First round	Vinogradar	4–2 (aet)
Crikvenica	2–1	Second round	Nehaj	3–2
Slaven Belupo	1–1	Quarter-finals	NK Zagreb	0–1
Slaven Belupo	2–2 (a)	Quarter-finals	NK Zagreb	2–0
Varteks	3–2	Semi-finals	Osijek	2–1
Varteks	3–2	Semi-finals	Osijek	1–1

== First leg ==
11 May 2005
20:45

Rijeka	2–1	Hajduk Split
Mitu 58'; Erceg 61'	Report (in Croatian)	Đolonga 22'

Stadion Kantrida, Rijeka
Attendance: 7,000
Referee: Ivan Novak (Varaždin)

RIJEKA:
GK	1	(Croatia) Velimir Radman
DF	4	(Croatia) Zoran Ivančić
DF	5	(Croatia) Dario Knežević
DF	6	(Slovakia) Peter Lérant
MF	7	(Croatia) Dragan Tadić (c)
MF	22	(Croatia) Mario Prišć		(substituted off) 68'
MF	23	(Bosnia and Herzegovina) Jasmin Mujdža
MF	25	(Croatia) Siniša Linić		(substituted off) 46'
FW	9	(Croatia) Tomislav Erceg
FW	20	(Romania) Dumitru Mitu
FW	21	(Croatia) Igor Novaković		(substituted off) 90'
Substitutes:
MF	14	(Croatia) Antun Dunković		(substituted on) 46'
MF	3	(Croatia) Kristijan Čaval	(yellow card) 77'	(substituted on) 61'
FW	11	(Croatia) Neno Katulić		(substituted on) 90'
Manager:
(Croatia) Elvis Scoria

HAJDUK SPLIT:
GK	12	(Croatia) Vladimir Balić
DF	6	(Croatia) Vlatko Đolonga (c)		(substituted off) 68'
DF	7	(Croatia) Hrvoje Vejić
DF	17	(Croatia) Tonči Žilić
DF	29	(Croatia) Danijel Hrman
MF	5	(Bosnia and Herzegovina) Almir Turković	(yellow card) 63'	(substituted off) 87'
MF	8	(Croatia) Dragan Blatnjak
MF	14	(Bosnia and Herzegovina) Dario Damjanović		(substituted off) 80'
MF	18	(Croatia) Ivan Leko
FW	9	(Croatia) Mate Dragičević	(yellow card) 26'	(substituted off) 69'
FW	30	(Croatia) Tomislav Bušić
Substitutes:
MF	20	(Uruguay) Pablo Munhoz	(yellow card) 78'	(substituted on) 69'
MF	21	(Bosnia and Herzegovina) Bulend Biščević		(substituted on) 80'
DF	2	(Croatia) Petar Šuto		(substituted on) 87'
Manager:
(Croatia) Igor Štimac

Assistant referees:
Ivica Grgić (Duga Resa)
Ivan Keškić (Vođinci)

Match rules

- 90 minutes.
- Seven named substitutes.
- Maximum of three substitutions.

== Second leg ==
25 May 2005
17:30

Hajduk Split	0–1	Rijeka
	Report (in Croatian)	Mitu 80'

Stadion Poljud, Split
Attendance: 20,000
Referee: Marijo Strahonja (Zagreb)

HAJDUK SPLIT:
GK	12	(Croatia) Vladimir Balić
DF	6	(Croatia) Vlatko Đolonga (c)
DF	7	(Croatia) Hrvoje Vejić
DF	27	(Croatia) Luka Vučko
DF	28	(Croatia) Tomislav Rukavina		(substituted off) 61'
MF	10	(Croatia) Niko Kranjčar
MF	14	(Bosnia and Herzegovina) Dario Damjanović
MF	18	(Croatia) Ivan Leko
MF	29	(Croatia) Danijel Hrman		(substituted off) 86'
FW	8	(Bosnia and Herzegovina) Dragan Blatnjak	(yellow card) 50'
FW	30	(Croatia) Tomislav Bušić		(substituted off) 57'
Substitutes:
FW	5	(Bosnia and Herzegovina) Almir Turković		(substituted on) 57'
FW	9	(Croatia) Mate Dragičević		(substituted on) 61'
FW	11	(Croatia) Natko Rački		(substituted on) 86'
Manager:
(Croatia) Igor Štimac

RIJEKA:
GK	1	(Croatia) Velimir Radman
DF	4	(Croatia) Zoran Ivančić	(yellow card) 50'
DF	5	(Croatia) Dario Knežević
DF	6	(Slovakia) Peter Lérant
DF	22	(Croatia) Mario Prišć		(substituted off) 80'
MF	3	(Croatia) Kristijan Čaval
MF	7	(Croatia) Dragan Tadić (c)
MF	14	(Croatia) Antun Dunković
MF	25	(Croatia) Siniša Linić	(yellow card) 74'	(substituted off) 71'
FW	9	(Croatia) Tomislav Erceg		(substituted off) 46'
FW	20	(Romania) Dumitru Mitu	(yellow card) 74'
Substitutes:
FW	11	(Croatia) Neno Katulić		(substituted on) 46'
DF	15	(Croatia) Daniel Šarić		(substituted on) 71'
MF	8	(Croatia) Josip Butić	(yellow card) 88'	(substituted on) 81'
Manager:
(Croatia) Elvis Scoria

Assistant referees:
Siniša Buić (Zagreb)
Josip Havaić (Koprivnica)

Match rules

- 90 minutes.
- Penalty shoot-out if scores still level; no extra time.
- Seven named substitutes.
- Maximum of three substitutions.
