= 2004 Croatian Football Super Cup =

Hajduk Split	Dinamo Zagreb
1	0
- Date: 17 July 2004
- Venue: Stadion Poljud, Split
- Man of the Match: Petar Šuto (Hajduk Split)
- Referee: Ivan Bebek (Rijeka)
- Attendance: 17,000
- Weather: Clear

The 2004 Croatian Football Super Cup was the sixth edition of the Croatian Football Super Cup, a football match contested by the winners of the previous season's Croatian First League and Croatian Football Cup competitions. The match was played on 17 July 2004 at Stadion Poljud in Split between 2003–04 Croatian First League winners Hajduk Split and 2003–04 Croatian Football Cup winners Dinamo Zagreb.

== Match details ==
17 July 2004
20:45 CEST

Hajduk Split	1–0	Dinamo Zagreb
Blatnjak 49'	Report (in Croatian)

Stadion Poljud, Split
Attendance: 17,000
Referee: Ivan Bebek (Rijeka)

HAJDUK SPLIT:
GK	12	(Croatia) Vladimir Balić
DF	17	(Croatia) Tonči Žilić
DF	7	(Croatia) Hrvoje Vejić	(yellow card) 62'
DF	23	(Croatia) Mato Neretljak	(yellow card) 65'
MF	2	(Croatia) Petar Šuto
MF	6	(Croatia) Vlatko Đolonga	(yellow card) 15'
MF	4	(Croatia) Frane Čačić
MF	15	(Croatia) Nenad Pralija (c)
MF	11	(Croatia) Mario Carević	(substituted off) 75'
FW	8	(Bosnia and Herzegovina) Dragan Blatnjak
FW	5	(Bosnia and Herzegovina) Almir Turković	(substituted off) 58'
Substitutes:
MF	20	(Uruguay) Pablo Munhoz	(substituted on) 58'
MF	14	(Bosnia and Herzegovina) Dario Damjanović	(substituted on) 75'
Manager:
(Croatia) Ivan Katalinić

DINAMO ZAGREB:
GK	1	(Croatia) Ivan Turina
DF	5	(Croatia) Andre Mijatović	(yellow card) 65'
DF	4	(Croatia) Damir Milinović
DF	14	(Croatia) Mario Lučić	(yellow card) 71'
MF	12	(Croatia) Ivan Bošnjak	(substituted off) 72'
MF	22	(Croatia) Ante Tomić	(substituted off) 72'
MF	8	(Croatia) Jasmin Agić
MF	23	(Croatia) Danijel Pranjić
MF	19	(Croatia) Niko Kranjčar (c)
FW	9	(Croatia) Goran Ljubojević	(substituted off) 58'
FW	24	(Croatia) Eduardo da Silva
Substitutes:
FW	11	(Croatia) Dario Zahora	(substituted on) 58'
MF	7	(Croatia) Hrvoje Štrok	(substituted on) 75'	(yellow card) 83'
MF	10	(Bosnia and Herzegovina) Edin Mujčin	(substituted on) 75'
Manager:
(Croatia) Nikola Jurčević

Match rules

- 90 minutes.
- 30 minutes of extra-time if necessary.
- Penalty shoot-out if scores still level
- Seven named substitutes.
- Maximum of three substitutions.
