= 2004–05 Croatian Football Cup =

Tournament details
- Country: Croatia
- Teams: 48

Final positions
- Champions: Rijeka (1st title)
- Runners-up: Hajduk Split

Tournament statistics
- Matches played: 54
- Goals scored: 186 (3.44 per match)
- Top goal scorer: Tomislav Erceg (7)

The 2004–05 Croatian Football Cup was the fourteenth season of Croatia's football knockout competition.

== Calendar ==
Round	Main date	Number of fixtures	Clubs	New entries this round
Preliminary round	7 September 2004	16	48 → 32	None
First round	21 September 2004	16	32 → 16	16
Second round	12 October 2004	8	16 → 8	None
Quarter-finals	8 and 31 March 2005	8	8 → 4	None
Semi-finals	20 March and 27 April 2005	4	4 → 2	None
Final	11 May and 25 May 2005	2	2 → 1	None

== Preliminary round ==
The preliminary round was held on 7 September 2004.

Tie no	Home team	Score	Away team
1	Međimurje	3–0	Moslavina
2	Tomislav	2–1	Vodnjan
3	Darda	1–3	Nehaj
4	Brestovac	0–8	Trnje
5	Slavonija Požega	1–3	Rudar Labin
6	Sladorana Županja	1–0	Vodice
7	Tvin Virovitica	0–8	Karlovac
8	Junak Sinj	2–3	Vinogradar
9	Tondach	2–1	Nedelišće
10	Sloboda Derma	4–1	Pag
11	Ivančica	1–5	Podravac
12	Koprivnica	3–1	Naftaš Ivanić
13	Rudeš	2–0	Strmec
14	Sinđelić	2–5	Budainka
15	Metalac Osijek	1–2	Bjelovar
16	Crikvenica	1–0	GOŠK Dubrovnik

== First round ==
First round was held on 21 and 22 September 2004.

Tie no	Home team	Score	Away team
1	Tondach	0–1	Osijek
2	Rudar Labin	1–6	Pula 1856
3	Podravac	0–2	Slaven Belupo
4	Sladorana Županja	0–4	Dinamo Zagreb
5	Vinogradar	2–4 (aet)	Hajduk Split
6	Tomislav	1–6	Varteks
7	Trnje	1–2	NK Zagreb
8	Budainka	1–0	Cibalia
9	Crikvenica	2–0	Kamen Ingrad
10	Rudeš	1–4	Rijeka
11	Karlovac	0–3	Pomorac
12	Međimurje	2–2 (7–6 p)	Inter Zaprešić
13	Sloboda Derma	2–2 (7–6 p)	Hrvatski Dragovoljac
14	Koprivnica	1–0	Zadar
15	Nehaj	2–1 (aet)	Šibenik
16	Bjelovar	1–2	Belišće

== Second round ==
Second round was held between 12 and 27 October 2004.

Tie no	Home team	Score	Away team
1	Budainka	1–4	Slaven Belupo
2	Koprivnica	0–4	Varteks
3	Pula 1856	3–1	Pomorac
4	Dinamo Zagreb	3–2	Belišće
5	Rijeka	2–1	Crikvenica
6	NK Zagreb	3–2	Međimurje
7	Nehaj	2–3	Hajduk Split
8	Osijek	2–0	Sloboda Derma

== Quarter-finals ==
First legs were held between 8 and 15 March and second legs between 15 and 31 March 2005.

Team 1	Agg.	Team 2	1st leg	2nd leg
NK Zagreb	1–2	Hajduk Split	1–0	0–2
Rijeka	3–3 (a)	Slaven Belupo	1–1	2–2
Varteks	1–0	Dinamo Zagreb	1–0	0–0
Osijek	1–0	Pula 1856	0–0	1–0

== Semi-finals ==
20 April 2005
17:30

Hajduk Split	2–1	Osijek
Gusić 67' (o.g.); Turković 72'	Report	Jukić 55'

Stadion Poljud, Split
Attendance: 4,000
Referee: Draženko Kovačić (Križevci)
27 April 2005
18:00

Osijek	1–1	Hajduk Split
Jukić 51'	Report	Leko 45'

Stadion Gradski vrt, Osijek
Attendance: 8,000
Referee: Marijo Strahonja (Zagreb)

Hajduk Split won 3–2 on aggregate.

20 April 2005
17:30

Rijeka	3–2	Varteks
Knežević 27'; Erceg 28' (pen.), 65'	Report	Jolić 12'; Benko 57'

Stadion Kantrida, Rijeka
Attendance: 1,500
Referee: Alojzije Šupraha (Kolan)
27 April 2005
17:30

Varteks	2–3	Rijeka
Šafarić 5'; Mujanović 55'	Report	Tadić 30'; Lérant 64'; Katulić 71'

Stadion Varteks, Varaždin
Attendance: 3,500
Referee: Vlado Svilokos (Sisak)

Rijeka won 6–4 on aggregate.

== Final ==
=== First leg ===
11 May 2005
20:45

Rijeka	2–1	Hajduk Split
Mitu 58'; Erceg 61'	Report (in Croatian)	Đolonga 22'

Stadion Kantrida, Rijeka
Attendance: 7,000
Referee: Ivan Novak (Varaždin)

=== Second leg ===
25 May 2005
17:30

Hajduk Split	0–1	Rijeka
	Report (in Croatian)	Mitu 80'

Stadion Poljud, Split
Attendance: 20,000
Referee: Marijo Strahonja (Zagreb)

Rijeka won 3–1 on aggregate.

== See also ==
- 2004–05 Croatian First Football League
- 2004–05 Croatian Second Football League
