= NK Papuk =

NK Papuk can refer to two Croatian football teams, both taking their name from Papuk mountain:

- NK Papuk Orahovica, club from Orahovica founded 1925
- NK Papuk Velika, club from Velika founded in 2008 as a successor of NK Kamen Ingrad
