= Mladen Križanović =

Croatian footballer

Personal information
- Full name: Mladen Križanović
- Date of birth: 24 September 1977 (age 49)
- Place of birth: Vinkovci, Croatia
- Height: 1.88 m (6 ft 2 in)
- Position: Defender

Senior career*
Years	Team	Apps	(Gls)
1999–2007	Cibalia	162	(17)
2007–2008	Hrvatski Dragovoljac		
2008–2009	Slavonac		
2009	Široki Brijeg	9	(0)
2010	Vukovar '91		
- * Club domestic league appearances and goals as of 31 December 2009

Mladen Križanović (born 24 September 1977) is a retired Croatian footballer.
