= Mato Neretljak =

Croatian football manager (born 1979)

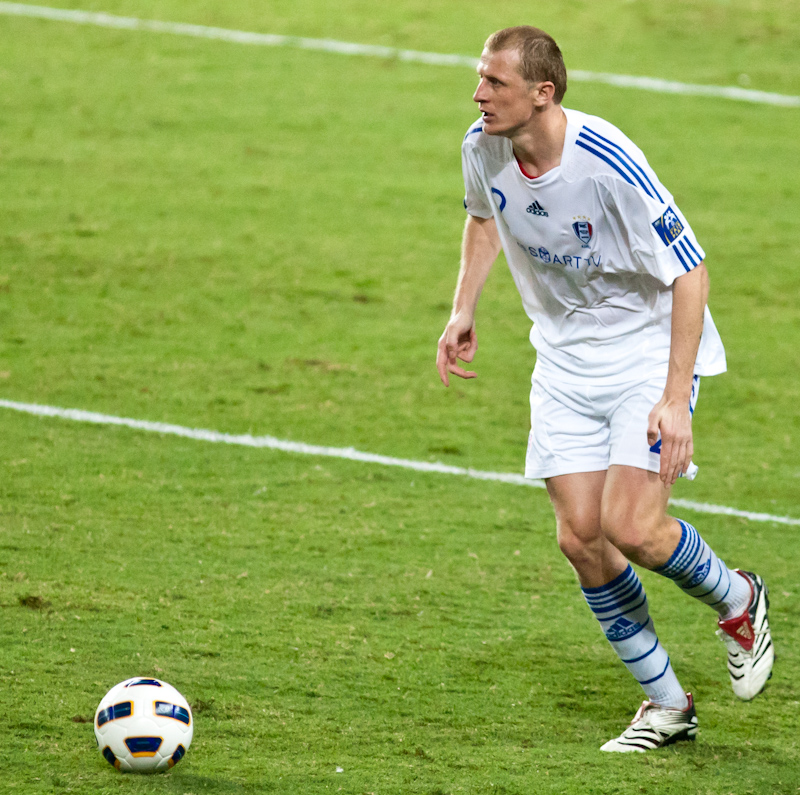
- Neretljak with Suwon Bluewings in 2011

Personal information
- Date of birth: 3 June 1979 (age 47)
- Place of birth: Orašje, SR Bosnia and Herzegovina, SFR Yugoslavia
- Height: 1.91 m (6 ft 3 in)
- Position: Defender

Team information
- Current team: Stupčanica (manager)

Youth career
- –1999: Orašje

Senior career*
Years	Team	Apps	(Gls)
1999–2000	Orašje	23	(2)
2000–2002	Osijek	47	(3)
2002–2005	Hajduk Split	77	(4)
2005–2008	Suwon Bluewings	110	(17)
2009–2010	Omiya Ardija	59	(11)
2011	Suwon Bluewings	23	(7)
2012	Hajduk Split	12	(1)
2012–2014	Rijeka	25	(1)
2013–2014	→ Zadar (loan)	24	(0)
Total		400	(46)

International career
2000–2001	Croatia U21	8	(0)
2001–2006	Croatia	10	(1)

Managerial career
- 2015–2016: Orašje
- 2016–2017: Metalleghe-BSI
- 2017–2018: Orašje
- 2018–2019: GOŠK Gabela
- 2019: Orašje
- 2020–2021: Zvijezda Gradačac
- 2022: Rudeš
- 2023–2024: Zvijezda Gradačac
- 2024: Zrinski Osječko
- 2025–2026: Zvijezda Gradačac
- 2026–: Stupčanica
- * Club domestic league appearances and goals

Mato Neretljak (born 3 June 1979) is a Croatian professional football manager and former professional player who is the manager of First League of FBiH club Stupčanica.

== Club career ==
Neretljak started his professional career in 1999 with HNK Orašje. In 2000, he transferred to NK Osijek for which he played until 2002.

Then he transferred to Hajduk Split and spent three seasons with the club before leaving it for South Korean club Suwon Samsung Bluewings in 2005.

In 2009, he moved to Japanese club Omiya Ardija.

On 23 May 2012, he signed for HNK Rijeka on a two-year contract. In 2014, he announced his retirement.

In his career, he won many titles with Hajduk Split, Suwon Bluewings and even one Herzeg-Bosnia Cup with Orašje.

== International career ==
Neretljak won eight international caps for the Croatia U21 national team in 2000 and 2001. While still playing for the U21 national team, he also made his full international debut for Croatia in a friendly match against Greece on 25 April 2001 in Varaždin, where he came on as a substitute for Boris Živković in the 88th minute.

His competitive international debut for Croatia came on 15 November 2003 in the UEFA Euro 2004 qualifying play-offs against Slovenia, where he played the entire 90 minutes in the first leg in Zagreb, which ended in a 1-1 draw. On 18 February 2004, he scored his only international goal for Croatia in their 2-1 defeat against Germany in Split. He was also part of the Croatian squad at the UEFA Euro 2004 finals in Portugal, but did not appear in any of the team's three group matches before they were knocked out of the tournament.

After the UEFA Euro 2004 finals, he only appeared in 4 international friendlies for Croatia, including both of their matches at the 2006 Carlsberg Cup in Hong Kong. He won a total of 10 international caps for the national team, 9 of which were in friendly matches. His final international was a February 2006 Carlsberg Cup match against hosts Hong Kong.

== Managerial career ==
Neretljak started off his managerial career after being appointed as manager of HNK Orašje in 2015. He managed Orašje until the end of the 2015–16 First League of FBiH season, where Orašje made a fantastic result coming in the third place.

On 14 November 2016, Neretljak was named the new manager of NK Metalleghe-BSI. He left Metalleghe on 1 June 2017, after failing not to get relegated in the 2016–17 Premier League season.

19 days after leaving Metalleghe, Neretljak came back to and became the new manager of Orašje once again. In that First League FBiH season, Orašje finished in the 5th place. After the last game of the season in which Orašje beat NK Travnik 3–2, Neretljak stuck to his word and left the club after the end of the season.

On 28 September 2018, after Feđa Dudić got sacked, Neretljak was named the new manager of Bosnian Premier League club GOŠK Gabela. In his first game as club's manager, on 30 September, the club unexpectedly beat Željezničar Sarajevo on Grbavica Stadium 1–2, with a 90+5th-minute penalty goal that won the game for GOŠK, with Mirsad Ramić scoring the goal from the penalty spot. On 12 March 2019, Neretljak left GOŠK after making a series of bad results with the club.

In July 2019, it was announced that Neretljak became the new manager of Orašje for the third time in his career. A few days later, he also accepted a job offer from the Croatian Football Federation as an assistant manager for the Croatia national under-20 team under manager Ognjen Vukojević. He left Orašje only a few months after coming back to the club because of losing five out of six matches in the league and getting to last place.

On 4 October 2020, Neretljak was named new manager of Zvijezda Gradačac. In his first game as Zvijezda manager, Neretljak led his team to a league win over Čapljina. His first loss as Zvijezda manager was against Radnik Hadžići also in a league match on 18 October 2020. Neretljak left the club in October 2021.

In July 2022, Neretljak was appointed as manager of Croatian Second League club NK Rudeš, ahead of the 2022–23 season. In mid September 2022, five fixtures into the season, when Rudeš were second in the table behind HNK Vukovar 1991 only on goal difference, Neretljak was sacked due to unsatisfactory early performance.

== Career statistics ==
=== International goals ===
Results list Croatia's goal tally first.

Date	Venue	Opponent	Result	Competition
18 February 2004	Split, Croatia	Germany	1–2	Friendly match

== Honours ==
=== Player ===
Orašje

- Herzeg-Bosnia Cup: 1999–2000

Hajduk Split

- Croatian First League: 2003–04
- Croatian Cup: 2002–03
- Croatian Super Cup: 2004

Suwon Bluewings

- K League 1: 2008
- Korean League Cup: 2008
- K League Super Cup: 2005

Individual

- K League 1 Best XI: 2006, 2007, 2008

=== Manager ===
Zvijezda Gradačac

- Second League of FBiH: 2025–26 (North)
