= Krešimir Makarin =

Croatian footballer

Personal information
- Full name: Krešimir Makarin
- Date of birth: 7 January 1987 (age 39)
- Place of birth: Rijeka, Croatia (then SFR Yugoslavia)
- Height: 1.81 m (5 ft 11 in)
- Position: Forward

Youth career
- Šibenik
- 2003–2004: Hajduk Split

Senior career*
Years	Team	Apps	(Gls)
2005–2008	Hajduk Split	11	(1)
2005	→ Šibenik (loan)	13	(3)
2006	→ Kamen Ingrad (loan)	6	(0)
2007	→ Pula (loan)	0	(0)
2008	→ Šibenik (loan)	4	(2)
2009	Cibalia	6	(0)
2009–2010	Šibenik	8	(0)
2010	Solin	0	(0)
2011	Vodice		
2011	Krka Lozovac		(3)
2012	Zagora Unešić	13	(6)

International career
2003	Croatia U-16	5	(6)
2004	Croatia U-18	2	(2)
2005–2006	Croatia U-19	12	(3)
- * Club domestic league appearances and goals

Krešimir Makarin (born 7 January 1987) is a Croatian retired footballer who plays as a forward or a winger.

== Club career ==
Makarin has played for Hajduk Split, Kamen Ingrad, Šibenik and HNK Cibalia in the Croatian Prva HNL.
