= Matko Perdijić =

Croatian footballer

Personal information
- Full name: Matko Perdijić
- Date of birth: 26 May 1982 (age 44)
- Place of birth: Split, Croatia
- Height: 2.01 m (6 ft 7 in)
- Position: Goalkeeper

Team information
- Current team: Zagłębie Sosnowiec (goalkeeping coach)

Senior career*
Years	Team	Apps	(Gls)
2001–2004	Mosor		
2005–2006	Hajduk Split	0	(0)
2005–2006	→ Šibenik (loan)	4	(0)
2006	GOŠK Dubrovnik		
2007–2013	Ruch Chorzów	36	(0)
2013–2015	Cracovia	4	(0)
2015	Widzew Łódź	0	(0)
2015–2016	Zagłębie Sosnowiec	4	(0)
2016–2017	Polonia Bytom	21	(0)
2017–2021	Zagłębie Sosnowiec	28	(0)
- * Club domestic league appearances and goals

Matko Perdijić (born 26 May 1982) is a Croatian former professional footballer who played as a goalkeeper. He currently works as a goalkeeping coach for Zagłębie Sosnowiec.

== Career ==
As a 22-year-old, Perdijić joined Hajduk Split from Mosor at the start of 2005. After he finished a lengthy spell in Poland, he was appointed goalkeeper coach at Zagłębie Sosnowiec in January 2022.
