= NK Papuk Velika =

Croatian football club

NK Papuk
- Full name: Nogometni klub Papuk
- Founded: 2008
- Ground: ŠRC Velika; Velika, Croatia
- Capacity: 10,000
- League: First League of Požega-Slavonia County
Home colours	Away colours

NK Papuk Velika is a Croatian football club from Velika, a small town near Požega in the northeast of Croatia. The club was formed as a successor of once highly successful club NK Kamen Ingrad that was dissolved in 2008.
