= Tomislav Grčić =

Croatian footballer (born 1986)

Personal information
- Full name: Tomislav Grčić
- Date of birth: 5 July 1986 (age 40)
- Place of birth: Split, Croatia
- Height: 1.88 m (6 ft 2 in)
- Positions: Defender; midfielder

Youth career
- Hajduk Split

Senior career*
Years	Team	Apps	(Gls)
2003–2008	Hajduk Split	2	(0)
2004–2006	→ Mosor (loan)	22	(0)
2006–2007	→ Imotski (loan)	33	(4)
2008	→ Trogir (loan)	9	(1)
2008–2009	Trogir	3	(0)
2010–2011	Maceratese		
- * Club domestic league appearances and goals as of 29 May 2009

Tomislav Grčić (born 5 July 1986) is a Croatian football player, who most recently played for Maceratese.
