= Luka Vučko =

Croatian footballer

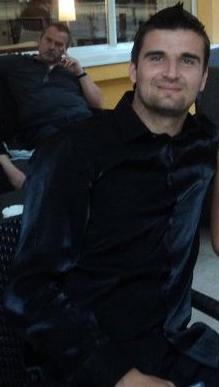

Personal information
- Full name: Luka Vučko
- Date of birth: 11 April 1984 (age 42)
- Place of birth: Split, SR Croatia, Yugoslavia
- Height: 1.97 m (6 ft 6 in)
- Position: Defender

Team information
- Current team: Hajduk Split U-17 (Manager)

Youth career
- 1992–1994: Primorac Stobreč
- 1994–2003: Hajduk Split

Senior career*
Years	Team	Apps	(Gls)
2002–2005	Hajduk Split	37	(2)
2003–2004	→ Solin (loan)	23	(0)
2006	Saturn Moskovskaya Oblast	0	(0)
2006	Hajduk Split	3	(0)
2007–2008	Rijeka	44	(1)
2008–2010	Eskişehirspor	47	(4)
2011–2012	Lechia Gdańsk	33	(2)
2012	Lechia Gdańsk II	2	(0)
2012	Pécs	0	(0)
2012	Pécs II	3	(1)
2013	San Antonio Scorpions	26	(1)
2014	Istra 1961	21	(0)
2015	Mosor		
2015–2016	Omiš		

International career
2004–2006	Croatia U21	19	(0)
2010	Croatia	1	(0)

Managerial career
- 2016–2021: Primorac Stobreč (academy coach)
- 2021–2022: Hajduk Split U-17
- 2022–2023: Hajduk Split U-18
- 2023–: Hajduk Split U-17
- * Club domestic league appearances and goals

Luka Vučko (born 11 April 1984) is a Croatian former professional footballer who played as a defender.

== Career ==
=== Club ===
A product of HNK Hajduk Split, Vučko had stints with Prva HNL sides Hajduk Split and NK Rijeka, after before moving to Süper Lig side Eskişehirspor in July 2008.

In February 2011, he joined Polish club Lechia Gdańsk on a half-year deal. He rescinded his contract in 2012 by mutual consent.

In September 2012, he joined Hungarian club (Pécsi MFC) for 2 years.

In February 2013, he joined North American Soccer League club San Antonio Scorpions FC.

=== International ===
Vučko also earned 19 caps for Croatia U21 team between 2004 and 2006. He was called up to the national team on 11 May 2010 by manager Slaven Bilić, as a replacement for Dario Knežević, for the May 2010 friendlies against Austria, Wales and Estonia. The game against Estonia, in which he came on as a 46th-minute substitute for Dejan Lovren, remained his sole international appearance.

== Personal life ==
He is a younger brother of former Croatia international player Jurica Vučko.

== Coaching career ==
Vučko started after his active career as a youth coach at NK Primorac Stobreč and later under a brand new youth project between the football school Union and Primorac Stobreč.

In the summer of 2021, Vučko was hired as coach of Hajduk Split's U-17 squad. He also coached the club's U-18 team for a period before moving back to U-17 coaching in October 2023.

== Honours ==
Hajduk Split

- Croatian Football League: 2004–05
- Croatian Cup: 2002–03
- Croatian Super Cup: 2004, 2005
