= Tvrtko Kale =

Croatian-Israeli footballer (born 1974)

Tvrtko Kale טברטקו קאלה
Personal information
- Full name: Tvrtko Kale (changed to Dreshler Kale)
- Date of birth: 5 June 1974 (age 52)
- Place of birth: Samobor, SR Croatia, SFR Yugoslavia
- Height: 1.94 m (6 ft 4 in)
- Position: Goalkeeper

Senior career*
Years	Team	Apps	(Gls)
- Lokomotiva
1994	Hrvatski Dragovoljac		
1995	Čakovec		
1996–1998	Inker Zaprešić	0	(0)
1998–2000	Rijeka	0	(0)
2001–2002	Hrvatski Dragovoljac	4	(0)
2003–2004	Zadar	25	(0)
2004–2006	Hajduk Split	32	(1)
2006	Neuchâtel Xamax	11	(0)
2006–2007	Maccabi Tel Aviv	33	(0)
2007–2009	Beitar Jerusalem	59	(0)
2009–2010	Hapoel Be'er Sheva	31	(1)
2010–2014	Hapoel Haifa	116	(0)
2014–2015	Hapoel Petah Tikva	28	(0)
2015–2016	Maccabi Kiryat Gat	21	(0)
- * Club domestic league appearances and goals as of 28 May 2015

Tvrtko Kale (now Dreshler Kale, Hebrew: טברטקו קאלה; born 5 June 1974) is a retired Croatian-Israeli footballer who played as of July 2015 for Maccabi Kiryat Gat. The newspaper Slobodna Dalmacija rated him the best player in the Croatian First League in 2004.

== Club career ==
Born in Samobor, Zagreb, Croatia, Kale started his career at NK Lokomotiva before moving to NK Hrvatski Dragovoljac in 1994 and NK Čakovec in 1995. From 1996 to 1998 he played for NK Inker moving around the Croatian League until signing with Hajduk Split in 2004. He was league champion with Hajduk in the 2004/2005 season. Starting in 2006, he played for Neuchâtel Xamax.

On 22 June 2007, Kale was transferred from Maccabi Tel Aviv to Israeli league champions Beitar Jerusalem for a price of $350,000 and a 2-year deal worth $300,000 per annum.

Kale moved to Hapoel Be'er Sheva for the 2009–2010 season, and scored one goal for the club

== Personal life ==
In an interview with Israeli sport portal Sport 5, Tvrtko revealed that he is a Jew according to Jewish law, since his grandmother on his mother's side was Jewish. In September 2007, Kale received his own Israeli identity card. He is engaged to Ronit Dahan, who is Jewish. In June 2010 Kale decided to change his first name so it would be more Jewish due to his forthcoming wedding. His new name is Dreshler.

== Honours ==
=== Player ===
Club

Hajduk Split

- Prva HNL:2004–05
- Croatian Supercup: 2005

Beitar Jerusalem

- Israeli Premier League: 2007–08
- Israel State Cup:2008, 2009

Hapoel Haifa

- Toto Cup: 2012–13

== See also ==
- List of select Jewish football (association; soccer) players
