= Stjepan Jukić =

Croatian footballer

Personal information
- Full name: Stjepan Jukić
- Date of birth: 10 December 1979 (age 46)
- Place of birth: Đakovo, SR Croatia, SFR Yugoslavia
- Height: 1.81 m (5 ft 11 in)
- Position: Midfielder

Youth career
- 1989–1993: NK Đakovo
- 1993–1998: Osijek

Senior career*
Years	Team	Apps	(Gls)
1998–2002	Osijek	56	(1)
2002–2003	Šibenik	21	(3)
2003–2005	Osijek	30	(12)
2005–2006	Lokeren	16	(3)
2006–2007	Osijek	38	(15)
2008	Sanfrecce Hiroshima	11	(0)
2009	Croatia Sesvete	17	(2)
2010	Qingdao Jonoon	27	(4)
2011	Chongqing Lifan	0	(0)
2012-2013	Trnje	19	(4)
2014	Zrinski Jurjevac		
- * Club domestic league appearances and goals as of 25 January 2014

Stjepan Jukić (Croatian pronunciation: [stjêpaːn jǔːkitɕ]; born 10 December 1979) is a Croatian retired football player.

== Club career ==
Jukić has previously played for NK Osijek, HNK Šibenik and Inter Zapresic in the Croatian First League.

In 2008, he played for Sanfrecce Hiroshima of the J2 League.

On 20 February 2010, Jukić was signed by Qingdao Jonoon as its first foreign footballer that season. He made his debut for the club in the first round match against Tianjin Teda, in which he served Slovenian Aleksander Rodić for the first goal. In the whole season, he capped 27 times with 4 goals and 4 services.

In 2011, Jukić agreed to sign a one-year contract with Chongqing Lifan. But he suffered a leg fracture during a pre-sonson friendly match in February, which ruled him out for the rest of the 2011 league season.
