= Mario Grgurović =

Croatian footballer

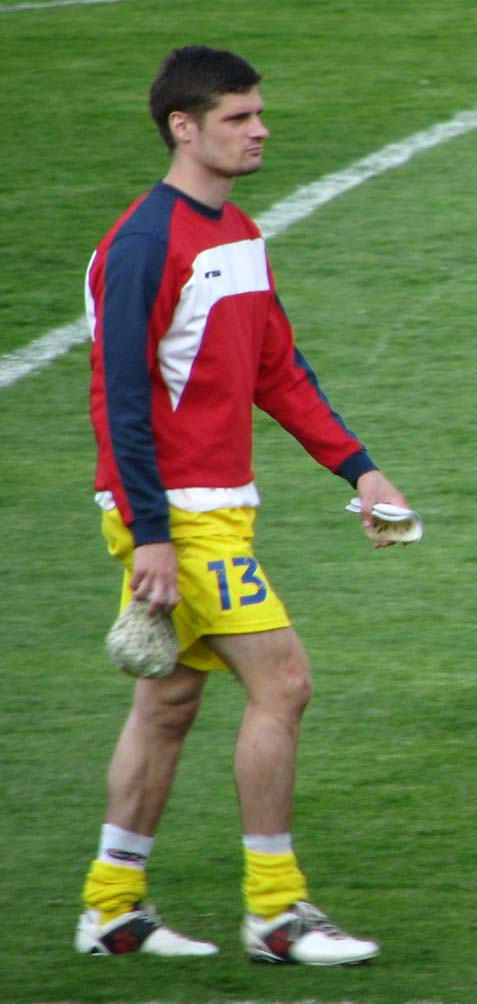

Personal information
- Date of birth: 2 February 1985 (age 41)
- Place of birth: Zadar, SR Croatia, SFR Yugoslavia
- Height: 1.81 m (5 ft 11 in)
- Position: Midfielder

Youth career
- Zadar
- 1999–2003: Hajduk Split

Senior career*
Years	Team	Apps	(Gls)
2003–2005	Hajduk Split	42	(4)
2005–2008	Dinamo Zagreb	0	(0)
2005–2007	→ Međimurje (loan)	14	(3)
2007	→ Istra 1961 (loan)	3	(0)
2007–2008	→ Inter Zaprešić (loan)	23	(2)
2008–2010	Inter Zaprešić	54	(8)
2011–2012	Žalgiris Vilnius	31	(6)
2012–2013	Gorica	11	(0)
2013–2014	Zadar	5	(0)
2015	Primorac Biograd	13	(1)
2016	HV Posedarje	0	(0)

International career^{‡}
2001	Croatia U15	3	(0)
2001	Croatia U16	3	(0)
2001–2002	Croatia U17	13	(1)
2002–2003	Croatia U18	6	(0)
2001–2004	Croatia U19	16	(1)
2004	Croatia U20	2	(0)
2004–2006	Croatia U21	17	(1)
- * Club domestic league appearances and goals as of 21 November 2017 ‡ National team caps and goals as of 21:28, 16 December 2009 (UTC)

Mario Grgurović (born 2 February 1985) is a Croatian retired football midfielder who last played for HV Posedarje.
