= Mate Dragičević =

Croatian footballer

Personal information
- Full name: Mate Dragičević
- Date of birth: 19 November 1979 (age 46)
- Place of birth: Makarska, SR Croatia, SFR Yugoslavia
- Height: 1.88 m (6 ft 2 in)
- Position: Striker

Youth career
- Zmaj Makarska
- 1994–1997: Zagreb

Senior career*
Years	Team	Apps	(Gls)
1997–2000	Zagreb	0	(0)
1997	→ Lučko (loan)		
1997–1998	→ Inker Zaprešić (loan)	20	(9)
1999–2000	→ Croatia Sesvete (loan)	20	(15)
2000–2001	Rijeka	19	(1)
2001–2002	Šibenik	26	(14)
2002–2004	Dinamo Zagreb	5	(2)
2004–2006	Hajduk Split	19	(6)
2006	Khimki	22	(7)
2007	Istra Pula	12	(2)
2007	Perth Glory	6	(0)
2008	Persepolis	12	(3)
2008	DAC Dunajská Streda	9	(2)
2009–2011	Zrinjski Mostar	27	(8)
2011–2012	Laçi	19	(7)
2012–2013	Lučko	4	(0)
2013–2014	Vinogradar		
2014	Konavljanin		

International career
- Croatia U21
- * Club domestic league appearances and goals

Mate Dragičević (born 19 November 1979) is a Croatian retired football striker.

== Club career ==
He has enjoyed successful stints at several clubs, with Croatian giants Hajduk Split and Dinamo Zagreb the standouts and has won two Prva HNL Croatian First League championships. His season at Dinamo was stunted due to injury, however he made nineteen appearances for Hajduk Split between 2004 and 2006 scoring six goals, last season at Hajduk Split he was injured. He has won First Russian Division championship with FC Khimki.

At Perth Glory he had an unsuccessful season. Dragicevic scored one goal in the pre-season cup competition away to Central Coast Mariners, but was unable to find the back of the net during the regular season.

On 20 January, the closing day of the Iranian winter transfer season, Dragičević signed a 6-month contract with Persepolis in the Iran Pro League. He scored his first goal for Persepolis against Abu Moslem Mashhad after 88 minutes on 10 Feb. In his third match for Persepolis, he scored against Peykan after 18 minutes on 15 February.

At the start of the 2009/2010 season he joined HŠK Zrinjski Mostar, but got injured in his first game. He returned to action on 8 November against Leotar, as second-half substitute, and scored a goal in 3-0 Zrinjski victory.

== Honours ==
Winner: 1

- 2002/03 with Dinamo Zagreb (First Croatian league)
- 2004/05 with Hajduk Split (First Croatian league)
- 2005/06 with Khimki Moscow (First Russian Division)
- 2007/08 with Persepolis (Iran Pro league)
