= Frane Čačić =

Croatian footballer

Frane Ćaćić
Personal information
- Full name: Frane Ćaćić
- Date of birth: 25 June 1980 (age 46)
- Place of birth: Zagreb, SR Croatia, Yugoslavia
- Height: 1.88 m (6 ft 2 in)
- Position: Midfielder

Youth career
- Jedinstvo Zagreb
- NK Zagreb

Senior career*
Years	Team	Apps	(Gls)
1998–2003	NK Zagreb	66	(6)
2003–2006	Hajduk Split	41	(6)
2006–2007	NK Varteks	13	(1)
2007	Busan I'Park	10	(1)
2008–2009	Lechia Gdańsk	1	(0)
2009	NK Vinogradar		
2010	Changsha Ginde	28	(1)

International career
2001	Croatia U20	1	(0)
2001	Croatia U21	1	(0)
- * Club domestic league appearances and goals

Frane Čačić (Croatian pronunciation: [frǎːne tʃâtʃitɕ]; born 25 June 1980) is a Croatian former professional footballer who played as a midfielder.

== Honours ==
NK Zagreb

- Croatian First Football League: 2001–02

Hajduk Split

- Croatian First Football League: 2003–04, 2004–05
