= Kašina =

- Village
- Location within Croatia
- Country: Croatia
- County: City of Zagreb
- City District: Sesvete

Area
  - Total: 3.2 sq mi (8.4 km^{2})

Population (2021)
  - Total: 1,402
  - Density: 430/sq mi (170/km^{2})
- Time zone: UTC+1 (CET)
  - Summer (DST): UTC+2 (CEST)

Kašina (Croatian pronunciation: [kâʃina]) is a settlement in the City of Zagreb, Croatia. It is located approximately 22 km northeast of the city center of Zagreb and north of the district Sesvete.

The first mention of Kašina dates to 1217 in the charter of King Andrew II. The church in Kašina was badly damaged in the 1880 Zagreb earthquake. The settlement lies on a Medvednica fault and was also near the epicenter of the 2020 Zagreb earthquake.

== Demographics ==
According to the 2021 census, its population was 1,402. According to the 2011 census, it had 1,548 inhabitants.
