= Tomislav Bušić =

Croatian footballer

Personal information
- Full name: Tomislav Bušić
- Date of birth: 2 February 1986 (age 40)
- Place of birth: Split, SR Croatia, Yugoslavia
- Height: 1.87 m (6 ft 2 in)
- Position: Forward

Team information
- Current team: GOŠK Kaštela
- Number: 30

Youth career
- 2000–2001: Mladost Proložac
- 2001–2004: Hajduk Split

Senior career*
Years	Team	Apps	(Gls)
2004–2009	Hajduk Split	85	(30)
2007–2008	→ Dynamo Kyiv (loan)	0	(0)
2007	→ Dynamo-2 Kyiv (loan)	1	(0)
2009–2010	Maccabi Petah Tikva	20	(1)
2010–2012	Slaven Belupo	50	(7)
2012–2013	Simurq	10	(1)
2013–2014	Vllaznia	28	(14)
2014–2015	Tirana	33	(4)
2015–2016	T-Team	16	(13)
2016–2019	Flamurtari	75	(23)
2019	Teuta	12	(1)
2019–2021	Gjilani	31	(10)
2021–	GOŠK Kaštela	39	(31)

International career
2002–2003	Croatia U17	18	(11)
2004–2005	Croatia U19	5	(4)
2006–2007	Croatia U20	3	(3)
2005–2008	Croatia U21	29	(13)
- * Club domestic league appearances and goals as of 6 January 2024

Tomislav Bušić (born 2 February 1986) is a Croatian professional footballer who plays as a forward for GOŠK Kaštela.

== Club career ==
=== Early career ===
He also formerly played for Slaven Belupo and Hajduk Split with whom he won the Croatian League in 2005. In the summer of 2007, Bušić was loaned to Dynamo Kyiv for a one-year period but was back to his native club within six months. In June 2009 he was released by Hajduk Split after playing for the club for 5 years, and signed a three-year contract with Maccabi Petah Tikva F.C., playing in the Israeli premier league, in July 2009. After a season there, however, he returned to Croatia, signing with Slaven Belupo.

After leaving Simurq, Bušić signed for Druga HNL side Solin, before leaving for Albanian Superliga Vllaznia after only 11 days.

=== Vllaznia ===
Two days before the end of the summer transfer window, Bušić joined Vllaznia on a one-year contract.

=== Tirana ===
On 10 July 2014, Bušić became a player of Tirana by signing a one-year deal. He was chosen as the replacement of Gilberto, who did not find a way to extend his contract with the club. During first part of the season, he had two faces, because he was prolific in 2014–15 Albanian Cup while in 2014–15 Albanian Superliga managed to score once in 15 appearances. Bušić scored that goal on 14 October during a 2–1 win over Elbasani in Qemal Stafa Stadium.

=== T-Team ===
In July 2015, Bušić went to Malaysia and signed with T-Team of Malaysian Premier League. He enjoyed a prolific form there, scoring 13 goals in 16 appearances.

=== Flamurtari ===
Bušić returned to Albania after one year on 5 July 2016 by completing a transfer to Flamurtari as a free agent, rejoining his former Tirana boss Gugash Magani. He signed a one-year contract with a reported annual salary of €40,000. He made his competitive debut for the team on 7 September 2016 in the opening league match of 2016–17 season against Skënderbeu. His first score-sheet contributions came in his second appearance, netting the second goal of the match as Flamurtari outclassed Luftëtari by winning 5–0 at home. Busić made his first cup appearance of the 2016–17 season on 5 October in the second leg of first round against Iliria, scoring the opener as Flamurtari recorded a 6–0 home win, qualifying thus to the second round.

On 26 October, in the first leg of the second round, Bušić netted a last-minute equalizer as Flamurtari drew 3–3 away at Tërbuni. His second league goal came four days later, netting the third in the match against Korabi Peshkopi, returning Flamurtari to the winning ways in league after six matches. Busić was again decisive for his team where he netted a winner in Flamurtari 2–0 home defeat of Skënderbeu, giving the team its second consecutive league win and removing from the relegation zone.

Busić kicked off 2017 by playing in team's first match against Skënderbeu on 28 January, and scored his fourth league goal one week later in the 2–1 home win against Lufëtari. Five days later, he scored his first brace with Flamurtari, but nevertheless the team was defeated 3–2 by Vllaznia at Loro Boriçi Stadium. He finished his first season with the club by making 32 appearances, including 28 in league, scoring 12 goals, including 10 league goals, being the team top goalscorer, as Flamurtari avoided the relegation by just one point.

On 24 June 2017, Bušić agreed a contract extension, signing until June 2018. He opened his scoring account for the 2017–18 season on 16 September by netting in the 3–1 home win against newbie Lushnja. The next week, he captained Flamurtari for the first time and scored a brace to lead the team into a 3–1 win over Teuta. Bušić suffered a muscle injury on 19 November during the match versus Lushnja as was taken off before in the first half; despite injured, Bušić continue to play, appearing in the last 4 minutes in next match against Teuta and full-90 minutes at Luftëtari. Bušić strained himself by playing again versus Vllaznia Shkodër on 9 December but was replaced again after 21 minutes, thus being unable to play for the rest of 2017.

He made a remarkable comeback in the first match of 2018 on 26 January, netting a tap-in seconds after missing a penalty in the 95th minute to give Flamurtari a 1–0 home win against Partizani. He then endured a barren run of 15 games without a goal for Flamurtari, ending the streak in the final matchday on 23 May by netting against Kukësi. He finished his second season in Vlorë by playing 30 league match and scoring 8 goals.

On 12 June 2018, after initially announcing his departure following the end of the season, Bušić returned to the club by agreeing a new one-year contract extension worth €5,000 per month.

On 25 January 2019, Bušić terminated the contract by reaching a consensus with club administrator Sinan Idrizi. In an interview, he explained that the reason of his departure was the unpaid wages that club owns him, stating: "It was hard to play without the wages". During his time in Vlorë, Bušić totaled 75 Albanian Superliga appearances, scoring 23 goals. In cup, he made 8 appearances and scored 2 goals, both of them in his first season.

=== Teuta ===
On 25 January 2019, on the same day as his departure, Teuta president Edmond Hasanbelliu confirmed that Bušić will continue his career with Djemtë e Detit. He was presented the following day, inking a contract until the end of 2018–19 campaign. He made his official debut on 28 January against his former side Flamurtari, entering as a second-half substitute and scoring a goal which was correctly disawolled, as the match ended in a 1–1 home draw.

=== Gjilani ===
In July 2019, Bušić joined SC Gjilani.

== International career ==
Bušić has been a regular and key part of the Croatian national under-21 team.

== Career statistics ==
As of 28 January 2019

Club statistics
Club	Season	League			Cup		Continental		Total	
Club	Season	Division	Apps	Goals	Apps	Goals	Apps	Goals	Apps	Goals
Slaven Koprivnica	2010–11	Prva HNL	15	1	2	0	—		16	8
Slaven Koprivnica	2011–12	Prva HNL	17	5	1	0	—		35	20
Slaven Koprivnica	2012–13	Prva HNL	17	1	4	2	4 (Note: All appearance(s) in UEFA Europa League)	2	21	4
Slaven Koprivnica	Total		49	7	7	2	4	2	60	11
Simurq	2012–13	Azerbaijan Premier League	9	1	2	0	—		11	1
Vllaznia	2013–14	Albanian Superliga	29	13	4	0	—		33	13
Tirana	2014–15	Albanian Superliga	33	4	7	4	—		41	8
T-Team	2015	Malaysia Premier League	22	9	1	0	—		23	9
T-Team	2016	Malaysia Super League	1	0	1	1	—		2	1
T-Team	Total		23	9	2	1	—		25	10
Flamurtari	2016–17	Albanian Superliga	28	10	4	2	—		32	12
Flamurtari	2017–18	Albanian Superliga	30	8	2	0	—		32	8
Flamurtari	2018–19	Albanian Superliga	17	5	2	0	—		19	5
Flamurtari	Total		75	23	8	2	—		83	25
Teuta	2018–19	Albanian Superliga	1	0	0	0	—		1	0
Career total			224	59	30	9	4	2	254	68
