= NK Nehaj =

Croatian football club

- Full name: Nogometni klub Nehaj
- Founded: 1920
- Ground: Pod Nehajem
- Capacity: 1,000
- Chairman: Željko Biondić
- Manager: Marin Tomljanović
- League: Treća HNL
colours

NK Nehaj is a Croatian football club based in the town of Senj.

They won the 2018 county cup.
