= Hrvoje Vejić =

Croatian footballer

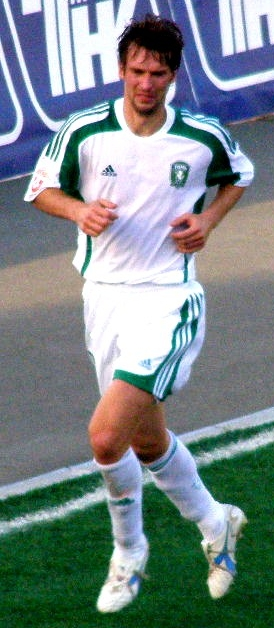
- Vejić playing for FC Tom Tomsk

Personal information
- Date of birth: 8 June 1977 (age 49)
- Place of birth: Metković, SFR Yugoslavia
- Height: 1.92 m (6 ft 4 in)
- Position: Centre back

Youth career
- 1984–1995: Jadran LP

Senior career*
Years	Team	Apps	(Gls)
1996-1997	Jadran LP		
1997-1998	Dubrovnik		
1998-2001	NK Zagreb	69	(6)
2001–2005	Hajduk Split	103	(11)
2005–2008	Tom Tomsk	81	(6)
2009–2012	Hajduk Split	46	(4)
2012	→ Primorac Stobreč (loan)	6	(0)
2012–2014	Jadran LP	17	(0)
2015	Zadar	2	(0)
2015–2016	Jadran LP	23	(1)

International career
1998–1999	Croatia U21	4	(0)
2007–2009	Croatia	5	(0)
- * Club domestic league appearances and goals

Hrvoje Vejić (born 8 June 1977) is a Croatian retired footballer who is the president of NK Jadran Luka Ploče. He played as a center-back throughout his career, spent mostly in Croatia with three seasons abroad in Russia. Vejić also represented the Croatia national football team at UEFA Euro 2008.

== Club career ==
In 1998, Vejić started his football career in the Croatian capital with NK Zagreb, where he played for three seasons. He then spent four seasons at Hajduk Split, where he became the team captain, before moving to Tom Tomsk of Russia.

Vejić joined his former club Hajduk Split on 12 January 2009, as a free player after leaving Tomsk.

== International career ==
He played four matches for his country's under-21 side between 1998 and 1999 in the qualifying matches for the 2000 UEFA European Under-21 Football Championship. He made his first appearance for the senior team against Norway in a friendly match on 7 February 2007. Despite not playing a single minute in Croatia's Euro 2008 qualification campaign he was chosen to participate in the final tournament, where he received one cap playing full 90 minutes in a 1–0 victory over Poland, as he and Knežević replaced regular starters Kovač and Šimunić, who were being rested.

Vejić earned a total of 5 caps, scoring no goals, and his final international was an April 2009 World Cup qualification match away against Andorra.
