= Petar Šuto =

Croatian footballer (born 1980)

Personal information
- Date of birth: 29 June 1980 (age 46)
- Place of birth: Imotski, SR Croatia, SFR Yugoslavia
- Height: 1.80 m (5 ft 11 in)
- Position: Midfielder

Youth career
- Croatia Zmijavci
- –1999: Hajduk Split

Senior career*
Years	Team	Apps	(Gls)
1999–2001	Hajduk Split	0	(0)
1999–2000	→ Mosor (loan)		
2000–2001	→ Šibenik (loan)	4	(0)
2001–2002	→ Posušje (loan)		(1)
2002–2003	Imotski	15	(0)
2004	Cibalia	13	(2)
2004–2006	Hajduk Split	23	(1)
2006	Posušje	15	(0)
2007–2011	Imotski	103	(8)
2011–2018	Croatia Zmijavci		
- * Club domestic league appearances and goals as of 12 August 2012

Petar Šuto (born 29 June 1980 in Imotski) is a Croatian football midfielder.

== Club career ==
Šuto started his career playing at youth level for Croatia Zmijavci until joining a Hajduk Split youth Academy. He signed a four-year professional contract and moved to NK Mosor into loan. Then he played for HNK Šibenik and NK Posušje, but has not returned to Split, but he was signed by NK Imotski.

He later moved to Cibalia and after a half-season returned to Hajduk Split. Already in the first match against Shelbourne he scored his first goal. Later has Hajduk eliminated and Šuto failed to retain a place in the first team. He is varied from the stand, over the bench to full-time slots but its speed is not succeeded to keep on the right wing of more than 20 games in two seasons. He on a Prva HNL for the 2004–05 season, and after a (not) playing in one of the worst seasons for the club, Luka Bonačić, and later Zoran Vulić were not counted on him for the 2006–07 season. Then he joined NK Posušje and after six month he moved to the hometown club NK Imotski.
