= Stadion Kamen Ingrad =

Football stadium in Velika, Croatia

- Interactive map of Stadion Kamen Ingrad
- Full name: Stadion ŠRC Kamen-Ingrad
- Location: Velika, Croatia
- Coordinates: 45°26′27″N 17°39′48″E
- Capacity: 8,000

Construction
- Built: 1997−2001
- Opened: 1999

Tenants
- Kamen Ingrad (1999–2008); Papuk Velika (2008-)

Kamen Ingrad Stadium (Croatian: Stadion Kamen Ingrad) is a football stadium in Velika, Croatia. It serves as home stadium for football club NK Kamen Ingrad, now NK Papuk Velika. The stadium has a capacity of 8,000 (7,095 as all-seater).

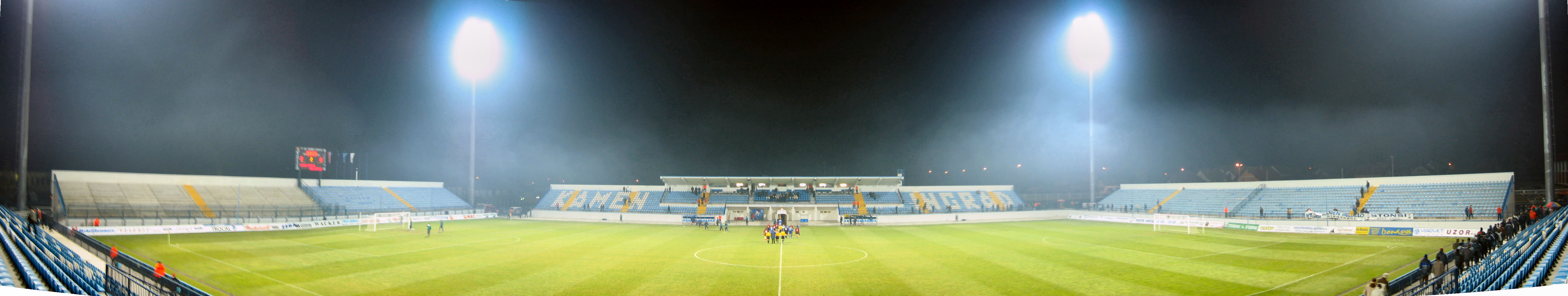
Panorama of the Kamen Ingrad Stadium taken in November 2004

According to the available project and legal documentation, the architectural design of the stadium is associated with the architect Petar Matijević. The stadium was built in several stages in the period from 1997 to 2001, coinciding with the most successful spell that the club has had, when they competed in the Croatian top level league from 2001–2007. It is owned by the construction company of the same name which built the stadium and which was the club's chief sponsor in the 2000s.

The stadium's greatest moment came when it hosted a 2003-04 UEFA Cup first round match between Kamen Ingrad and German side Schalke 04 (the result was a 0:0 draw in Velika, while the away leg in Gelsenkirchen ended 1:0 in Schalke's favour). In the Prva HNL 2006-07 season, the club was relegated from Croatia's top level league, and it continues to experience a steep decline ever since. However, the stadium hosted a few top-flight football matches in the 2008–09 season. This was due to newly promoted Croatia Sesvete's home ground, Stadion ŠRC Sesvete, being deemed unfit for first league football.
