= Almir Turković =

Bosnian footballer (born 1970)

Personal information
- Date of birth: 3 November 1970 (age 55)
- Place of birth: Sarajevo, SFR Yugoslavia
- Height: 1.83 m (6 ft 0 in)
- Position: Forward

Youth career
- 1988–1994: Sarajevo

Senior career*
Years	Team	Apps	(Gls)
1994	Sarajevo	7	(4)
1995	Vorwärts Steyr	8	(1)
1996	Tigres UANL		
1996–1997	Sarajevo	20	(3)
1997–1999	Zadar	54	(16)
1999–2000	Osijek	19	(7)
2000	Sarajevo	12	(2)
2000–2001	Osijek	34	(10)
2002	Cerezo Osaka	38	(11)
2003–2005	Hajduk Split	49	(16)
2005–2006	Osijek	27	(3)
2006–2008	Sarajevo	48	(8)
Total		316	(81)

International career
1995–2003	Bosnia and Herzegovina	11	(0)

Managerial career
- 2008–2010: Sarajevo (assistant)
- * Club domestic league appearances and goals

Almir Turković (born 3 November 1970) is a Bosnian retired professional football forward and manager.

Turković played for hometown club Sarajevo in Bosnia and Herzegovina, and for clubs in the Croatian Prva HNL and Japanese J2 League.

== Club career ==
Turković played for Zadar, Osijek and Hajduk Split in the Croatian Prva HNL and later played for Sarajevo in the Bosnian Premier League. He also played in Austria, Mexico for Tigres UANL during the 1995–96 season and Japan.

Turković won the Bosnian Premier League and Bosnian Cup with Sarajevo, while with Hajduk he won the Prva HNL, the Croatian Cup and the Croatian Super Cup. He made over 100 appearances for Sarajevo in all competitions.

Turković was also named the Bosnian Premier League player of the season in 2006–07. He retired at the age of 38 while playing for Sarajevo after the end of the 2007–08 season.

== International career ==
Turković made his senior debut in Bosnia and Herzegovina's first ever official international game, a November 1995 friendly game away against Albania, and has earned a total of 11 caps, scoring no goals. His final international was a March 2003 European Championship qualification match against Luxembourg.

== Managerial career ==
=== Sarajevo ===
In January 2009, after Mehmed Janjoš was named the new manager of Sarajevo, he named Turković his assistant.

In June 2009, Turković got suspended after claiming that Sarajevo became a not serious club and that the club officials at the time didn't get the wanted players the coaching staff wanted. On 1 July 2009, the suspension was lifted and Turković came back to the coaching staff.

In April 2010, after Mirza Varešanović became the new manager, Turković wasn't anymore the caretaker manager and came back to the position of an assistant. In July 2010, after Varešanović decided that Turković will not be his assistant anymore, he decided to leave the club.

=== Return to Sarajevo (academy) ===
In January 2019, Turković was named the new head coach of the FK Sarajevo U17 team. While being the head coach of the youth team, on 13 March 2019, Turković suffered a heart attack and was needed to immediately be operated. Luckily, the operation went good and Turković has been in a stable condition ever since.

== Career statistics ==
=== Club ===
Appearances and goals by club, season and competition
Club	Season	League			National cup (Note: Includes Emperor's Cup.)		Europe		Other		Total	
Club	Season	Division	Apps	Goals	Apps	Goals	Apps	Goals	Apps	Goals	Apps	Goals
Sarajevo	1994	First League	7	4	4	0	–		–		11	4
Vorwärts Steyr	1995–96	Austrian Bundesliga	8	1	2	1	–		–		10	2
Sarajevo	1996–97	First League	20	3	5	5	–		–		25	8
Zadar	1997–98	1. HNL	27	7	2	0	–		–		29	7
Zadar	1998–99	1. HNL	27	9	2	1	–		–		29	10
Zadar	Total		54	16	4	1	0	0	0	0	58	17
Osijek	1999–2000	1. HNL	19	7	4	2	2	0	–		25	9
Sarajevo	1999–2000	First League	12	2	0	0	–		–		12	2
Osijek	2000–01	1. HNL	21	8	3	1	4	2	–		28	11
Osijek	2001–02	1. HNL	13	2	1	2	6	1	–		20	5
Osijek	Total		34	10	4	3	10	3	0	0	48	16
Cerezo Osaka	2002	J2 League	38	11	3	3	–		–		41	14
Hajduk Split	2002–03	1. HNL	12	7	3	1	–		–		15	8
Hajduk Split	2003–04	1. HNL	16	5	0	0	–		1	0	17	5
Hajduk Split	2004–05	1. HNL	21	4	7	2	1	0	1	0	30	6
Hajduk Split	Total		49	16	10	3	1	0	2	0	62	19
Osijek	2005–06	1. HNL	27	3	4	1	–		–		31	4
Sarajevo	2006–07	Bosnian Premier League	21	5	7	0	–		–		28	5
Sarajevo	2007–08	Bosnian Premier League	27	3	4	3	5	1	–		36	7
Sarajevo	Total		48	8	11	3	5	1	0	0	64	12
Career total			316	81	51	22	18	4	2	0	387	107

=== International ===
Appearances and goals by national team and year
National team	Year	Apps	Goals
Bosnia and Herzegovina	1995	1	0
Bosnia and Herzegovina	1996	1	0
Bosnia and Herzegovina	1997	4	0
Bosnia and Herzegovina	1998	1	0
Bosnia and Herzegovina	1999	3	0
Bosnia and Herzegovina	2000	0	0
Bosnia and Herzegovina	2001	0	0
Bosnia and Herzegovina	2002	0	0
Bosnia and Herzegovina	2003	1	0
Total		11	0

== Honours ==
=== Player ===
Sarajevo

- Bosnian Premier League: 2006–07
- Bosnian Cup: 1996–97

Hajduk Split

- 1. HNL: 2003–04, 2004–05
- Croatian Cup: 2002-03
- Croatian Super Cup: 2005

=== Individual ===
- Bosnian Premier League Player of the Season: 2006–07
