= Dario Damjanović =

Bosnian football manager (born 1981)

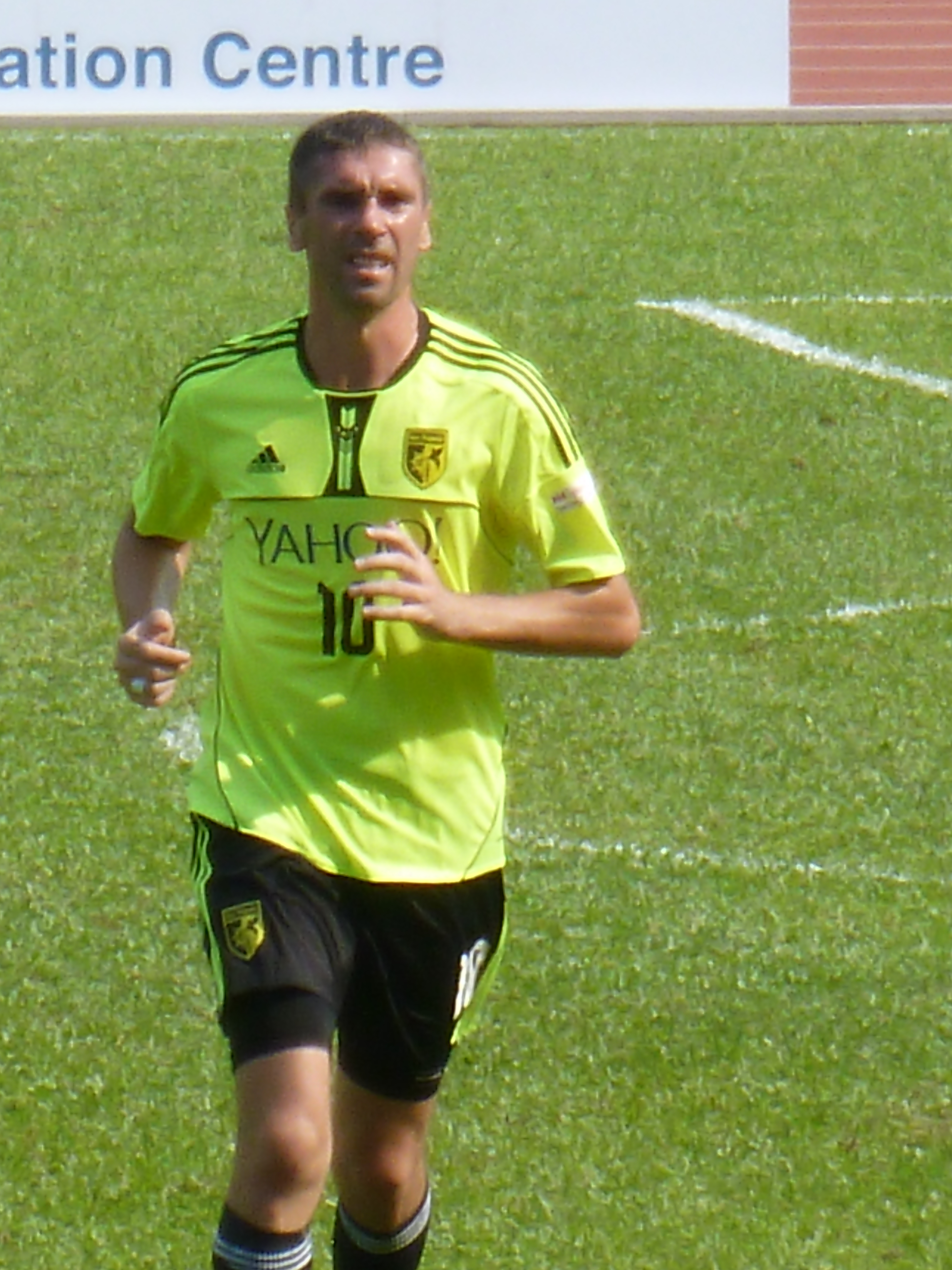
- Damjanović with Sun Pegasus in 2014

Personal information
- Date of birth: 23 July 1981 (age 45)
- Place of birth: Gradačac, SFR Yugoslavia
- Height: 1.89 m (6 ft 2 in)
- Position: Defensive midfielder

Youth career
- Borac Šamac

Senior career*
Years	Team	Apps	(Gls)
2003–2004	Modriča	25	(1)
2004–2007	Hajduk Split	81	(1)
2008	Luch Vladivostok	25	(1)
2009–2010	1. FC Kaiserslautern	12	(0)
2011–2012	Čelik Zenica	14	(0)
2012	Novi Pazar	12	(4)
2013–2014	Jagodina	33	(1)
2014–2015	Sun Pegasus	11	(1)
2015	OFK Beograd	7	(0)
2016–2017	Zvijezda Gradačac	32	(0)
2018	Modriča	4	(0)
2019	Odžak 102		
2020	Jedinstvo Brčko	1	(0)

International career
2004–2009	Bosnia and Herzegovina	17	(2)

Managerial career
- 2020: Zvijezda Gradačac
- 2020–2021: Orašje
- 2022: Vis Simm-Bau
- 2023–2024: Čelik Zenica
- 2025: Igman Konjic
- * Club domestic league appearances and goals

Dario Damjanović (born 23 July 1981) is a Bosnian professional football manager and former player.

== Club career ==
Damjanović started his career in Bosnia and Herzegovina, but signed with Croatian club Hajduk Split in the summer of 2004.

On 31 January 2009, he moved from Luch Vladivostok of the Russian Premier League to German side 1. FC Kaiserslautern.

In September 2011, Damjanović returned to Bosnia and signed with Bosnian Premier League club Čelik Zenica.

== International career ==
Damjanović made his debut for Bosnia and Herzegovina in a February 2004 friendly match away against Macedonia and has earned a total of 17 caps, scoring 2 goals. On 26 March 2008, he scored two goals for Bosnia in a friendly against Macedonia. These were his first two goals ever for the national team. His final international game was an August 2009 friendly against Iran.

== Career statistics ==
Scores and results table. Bosnia and Herzegovina's goal tally first.

#	Date	Venue	Opponent	Score	Result	Competition
1	26 March 2008	Bilino Polje, Zenica, Bosnia and Herzegovina	Macedonia	1–0	2–2	Friendly
2	26 March 2008	Bilino Polje, Zenica, Bosnia and Herzegovina	Macedonia	2–0	2–2	Friendly

== Managerial statistics ==
As of match played 16 November 2025

Managerial record by team and tenure
Team	From	To	Record							
Team	From	To	G	W	D	L	GF	GA	GD	Win %
Zvijezda Gradačac	20 August 2020	4 October 2020	8	4	1	3	7	7	+0	50.00
Orašje	19 October 2020	31 December 2021	34	13	7	14	45	47	−2	38.24
Vis Simm-Bau	1 January 2022	1 June 2022	14	6	2	6	17	15	+2	42.86
Čelik Zenica	23 October 2023	1 October 2024	28	13	5	10	36	29	+7	46.43
Igman Konjic	22 August 2025	31 December 2025	13	3	1	9	16	32	−16	23.08
Total			97	39	16	42	121	130	−9	40.21

== Honours ==
=== Player ===
Modriča

- Bosnian Cup: 2003–04

Hajduk Split

- Croatian First League: 2004–05

Jagodina

- Serbian Cup: 2012–13
