= 2003–04 Croatian First Football League =

Prva HNL Ožujsko
- Season: 2003–04
- Champions: Hajduk Split; 5th Croatian title 17th domestic title
- Runner up: Dinamo Zagreb
- Relegated: Cibalia; Marsonia
- Champions League: Hajduk Split
- UEFA Cup: Dinamo Zagreb; Rijeka
- Intertoto Cup: Kamen Ingrad; Slaven Belupo
- Matches: 192
- Goals: 531 (2.77 per match)
- Best player: Niko Kranjčar
- Top goalscorer: Robert Špehar (18)
- Biggest home win: Dinamo Z. 7–0 Marsonia
- Biggest away win: Zadar 0–3 Osijek; Marsonia 0–3 Inter Z.
- Highest scoring: Dinamo Z. 7–0 Marsonia; Inter Z. 4–3 S. Belupo; Varteks 3–4 Dinamo Z.
- Average attendance: 2,919

The 2003–04 Croatian First Football League (also known as 1. HNL; officially styled as Prva HNL Ožujsko for sponsorship reasons) was the thirteenth season of the Croatian First Football League, the national championship for men's association football teams in Croatia, since its establishment in 1992. The season started on 24 July 2003 and ended on 15 May 2004. Dinamo Zagreb were the defending champions, having won their tenth championship title the previous season. Hajduk Split won the title, after a win against Varteks on 15 May 2004.

== Teams ==
=== Stadia and personnel ===
Locations of teams in 2003–04 Prva HNL

Team	Manager^{1}	Location	Stadium	Capacity
Cibalia	(Croatia) Davor Mladina	Vinkovci	Stadion HNK Cibalia	9,920
Dinamo Zagreb	(Croatia) Nikola Jurčević	Zagreb	Stadion Maksimir	37,168
Hajduk Split	(Croatia) Petar Nadoveza	Split	Stadion Poljud	35,000
Inter Zaprešić	(Croatia) Srećko Bogdan	Šibenik	Stadion ŠRC Zaprešić	5,000
Kamen Ingrad	(Croatia) Nenad Gračan	Velika	Stadion Kamen Ingrad	8,000
Marsonia	(Croatia) Vjekoslav Lokica	Slavonski Brod	Gradski stadion uz Savu	10,000
Osijek	(Croatia) Branko Karačić	Osijek	Stadion Gradski vrt	19,500
Rijeka	(Croatia) Ivan Katalinić	Rijeka	Stadion Kantrida	10,275
Slaven Belupo	(Croatia) Milo Nižetić	Koprivnica	Gradski stadion u Koprivnici	4,000
Varteks	(Croatia) Miroslav Blažević	Varaždin	Stadion Varteks	10,800
Zadar	(Croatia) Stanko Mršić	Zadar	Stadion Stanovi	5,860
NK Zagreb	(Croatia) Mile Petković	Zagreb	Stadion Kranjčevićeva	8,850

- ^{1} On final match day of the season, played on 15 May 2004.

== First stage ==
Pos	Team	Pld	W	D	L	GF	GA	GD	Pts	Qualification
1	Hajduk Split	22	18	1	3	46	18	+28	55	Qualification to championship group
2	Dinamo Zagreb	22	15	5	2	47	16	+31	50	Qualification to championship group
3	Rijeka	22	8	7	7	26	25	+1	31	Qualification to championship group
4	Osijek	22	8	5	9	36	40	−4	29 (Note: Head-to-head record: Osijek–Varteks 3–1, Varteks–Osijek 1–1.)	Qualification to championship group
5	Varteks	22	7	8	7	21	25	−4	29	Qualification to championship group
6	Zadar	22	7	7	8	37	44	−7	28 (Note: Head-to-head record: Zadar–Kamen Ingrad 2–1, Kamen Ingrad–Zadar 2–2.)	Qualification to championship group
7	Kamen Ingrad	22	8	4	10	32	27	+5	28	Qualification to relegation group
8	Inter Zaprešić	22	6	9	7	22	23	−1	27	Qualification to relegation group
9	Slaven Belupo	22	6	8	8	22	27	−5	26	Qualification to relegation group
10	Cibalia	22	5	5	12	25	35	−10	20	Qualification to relegation group
11	NK Zagreb	22	3	10	9	21	32	−11	19	Qualification to relegation group
12	Marsonia	22	4	5	13	25	48	−23	17	Qualification to relegation group

Source: RSSSF.org
Rules for classification: 1) points; 2) goal difference; 3) number of goals scored.

=== Rounds 1–22 results ===
Home \ Away	CIB	DIN	HAJ	INT	KAM	MAR	OSI	RIJ	SLA	VAR	ZAD	ZAG
Cibalia		0–1	2–3	1–0	1–1	2–4	3–2	0–1	1–1	2–0	1–1	1–1
Dinamo Zagreb	3–2		1–0	1–0	1–1	7–0	4–0	2–0	4–0	3–0	4–2	1–1
Hajduk Split	3–1	3–1		1–4	1–0	5–0	2–0	4–0	2–1	2–0	3–1	2–0
Inter Zaprešić	1–0	1–1	0–2		3–1	1–1	1–1	1–1	2–0	0–0	0–2	1–1
Kamen Ingrad	3–2	0–1	0–1	3–1		5–0	2–0	0–1	2–0	3–0	2–2	1–1
Marsonia	1–3	1–3	0–0	0–1	0–2		1–2	1–1	0–0	0–0	4–1	3–0
Osijek	2–1	3–2	2–3	3–2	3–2	2–1		2–3	0–1	3–1	1–2	5–2
Rijeka	0–1	0–0	1–2	0–1	1–2	3–1	2–0		2–0	0–0	4–2	1–0
Slaven Belupo	0–0	0–1	1–1	1–1	2–0	3–1	3–3	1–1		2–1	4–0	1–0
Varteks	1–0	0–2	2–0	2–0	1–0	1–1	1–1	1–1	2–0		3–2	2–0
Zadar	4–1	2–2	1–3	0–0	2–1	3–2	1–1	3–2	2–0	2–2		1–1
NK Zagreb	2–0	0–2	0–2	1–1	3–1	2–3	0–0	1–1	1–1	1–1	3–1	

Source: RSSSF.org
Legend: Blue = home team win; Yellow = draw; Red = away team win.

== Championship group ==
Pos	Team	Pld	W	D	L	GF	GA	GD	Pts	Qualification
1	Hajduk Split (C)	32	25	3	4	63	24	+39	78	Qualification to Champions League second qualifying round
2	Dinamo Zagreb	32	23	7	2	77	25	+52	76	Qualification to UEFA Cup second qualifying round
3	Rijeka	32	11	9	12	36	41	−5	42	Qualification to UEFA Cup second qualifying round
4	Osijek	32	11	6	15	50	57	−7	39	
5	Varteks	32	9	11	12	33	42	−9	38	
6	Zadar	32	7	11	14	46	71	−25	32	

Source: RSSSF.org
Rules for classification: 1) points; 2) goal difference; 3) number of goals scored.
(C) Champions

=== Rounds 23–32 results ===
Home \ Away	DIN	HAJ	OSI	RIJ	VAR	ZAD
Dinamo Zagreb		3–1	4–1	5–0	4–1	5–0
Hajduk Split	0–0		2–0	2–0	2–0	5–1
Osijek	2–3	0–1		2–1	4–1	1–1
Rijeka	0–1	0–1	2–1		1–0	3–1
Varteks	3–4	0–0	2–0	1–1		4–1
Zadar	1–1	2–3	0–3	2–2	0–0	

Source: RSSSF.org
Legend: Blue = home team win; Yellow = draw; Red = away team win.

== Relegation group ==
Pos	Team	Pld	W	D	L	GF	GA	GD	Pts	Qualification or relegation
7	Kamen Ingrad	32	13	7	12	45	36	+9	46	Qualification to Intertoto Cup second round
8	Inter Zaprešić	32	11	9	12	40	38	+2	42	
9	Slaven Belupo	32	10	10	12	37	39	−2	40	Qualification to Intertoto Cup first round
10	NK Zagreb	32	8	12	12	33	41	−8	36	
11	Cibalia (R)	32	8	7	17	39	53	−14	31	Qualification to relegation play-off
12	Marsonia (R)	32	5	10	17	32	64	−32	25	Relegation to Croatian Second Football League

Source: RSSSF.org
Rules for classification: 1) points; 2) goal difference; 3) number of goals scored.
(R) Relegated

=== Rounds 23–32 results ===
Home \ Away	CIB	INT	KAM	MAR	SLA	ZAG
Cibalia		3–1	2–1	0–0	2–1	2–2
Inter Zaprešić	3–1		3–2	3–0	4–3	0–1
Kamen Ingrad	3–1	1–0		0–0	1–0	1–0
Marsonia	3–2	0–3	1–1		2–2	0–0
Slaven Belupo	2–0	2–0	1–1	2–1		0–1
NK Zagreb	2–1	2–1	1–2	3–0	0–2	

Source: RSSSF.org
Legend: Blue = home team win; Yellow = draw; Red = away team win.

=== Relegation play-off ===
==== First leg ====
21 May 2004

Međimurje	2–0	Cibalia
Kelemen 27'; Domjanić 65'

Stadion SRC Mladost, Čakovec
Attendance: 4,000
Referee: Vlado Svilokos (Sisak)

==== Second leg ====
23 May 2004

Cibalia	2–2	Međimurje
Pavličić 19'; Greer 82'		Kresinger 32'; Ribić 58'

Stadion HNK Cibalia, Vinkovci
Attendance: 3,000
Referee: Ivan Bebek (Rijeka)

Međimurje win 4–2 on aggregate and are promoted to 2004–05 Prva HNL.

== Top goalscorers ==
Rank	Player	Club	Goals
1	(Croatia) Robert Špehar	Osijek	18
2	(Croatia) Goran Ljubojević	Osijek	16
2	(Croatia) Dario Zahora	Dinamo Zagreb	16
4	(Bosnia and Herzegovina) Zoran Zekić	Kamen Ingrad	13
5	(Croatia) Mate Brajković	Zadar	12
5	(Croatia) Petar Krpan	Hajduk Split	12
5	(Croatia) Marijan Vuka	Marsonia	12
8	(Croatia) Sandro Klić	Rijeka	11
8	(North Macedonia) Goce Sedloski	Dinamo Zagreb	11

Source: 1.hnl.net (in Croatian)

== Attendances ==
#	Club	Average
1	Hajduk	6,179
2	Dinamo Zagreb	3,107
3	Rijeka	3,077
4	Zadar	2,577
5	Marsonia	2,423
6	Osijek	2,192
7	Varteks	2,050
8	Slaven	2,038
9	Kamen	1,935
10	Zagreb	1,817
11	Zaprešić	1,800
12	Cibalia	1,475

== See also ==
- 2003–04 Croatian Second Football League
- 2003–04 Croatian Football Cup
