= Dragan Blatnjak =

Bosnian footballer (born 1981)

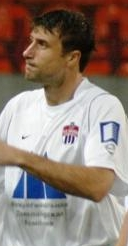
- Blatnjak playing for FC Khimki

Personal information
- Date of birth: 1 August 1981 (age 45)
- Place of birth: Studenci, SR Bosnia and Herzegovina, Yugoslavia
- Height: 1.81 m (5 ft 11 in)
- Position: Midfielder

Youth career
- 1993–1997: Jadran LP
- 1998: Zagreb
- 1998: Jadran LP
- 1999–2000: HNK Grude

Senior career*
Years	Team	Apps	(Gls)
2000–2001	Brotnjo Čitluk	40	(18)
2001–2003	Zadar	37	(12)
2003–2006	Hajduk Split	91	(17)
2006–2010	FC Khimki	74	(7)
2010–2012	Rostov	59	(6)
2013	Osijek	9	(0)

International career
2002–2007	Bosnia and Herzegovina	12	(0)

Managerial career
- 2017–2018: Primorac Biograd
- 2018: Zadar
- 2019: Zagora Unešić
- 2021–2022: Zadar (assistant)
- 2022–2023: Zadar
- * Club domestic league appearances and goals

Dragan Blatnjak (born 1 August 1981) is a Bosnian football manager and former player.

== Club career ==
Previously Blatnjak played for Russian club FC Khimki (until 2010) and Hajduk Split in the Croatian First League.

== International career ==
He made his debut for Bosnia and Herzegovina in a March 2002 friendly match away against Macedonia and has earned a total of 12 caps, scoring no goals. His final international was an October 2007 European Championship qualification match against Norway.

== Managerial career ==
After first being an assistant coach at the club, Blatnjak was named manager of Zadar in December 2022.
