= Vladimir Balić =

Croatian footballer

Personal information
- Full name: Vladimir Balić
- Date of birth: 29 September 1970 (age 56)
- Place of birth: Vinkovci, SFR Yugoslavia
- Height: 1.90 m (6 ft 3 in)
- Position: Goalkeeper

Senior career*
Years	Team	Apps	(Gls)
1999–2000	Vukovar '91	31	(0)
2000–2001	Osijek	26	(0)
2001–2002	Zadar	4	(0)
2002–2008	Hajduk	66	(0)
- * Club domestic league appearances and goals

Vladimir Balić (born 29 September 1970) is a Croatian former football goalkeeper who last played for Hajduk.

== Club career ==
Balić played for Vukovar '91, Osijek and Zadar before joining Hajduk.

He was sporting director of HNK Cibalia in 2017 and 2018.

Awards
Preceded by Dean Računica	Heart of Hajduk Award; 2005	Succeeded by None
