= Marijo Strahonja =

Croatian association football referee (born 1975)

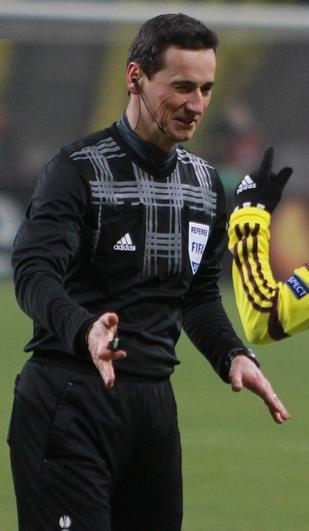
- Full name: Marijo Strahonja
- Born: August 21, 1975 (age 51)

Domestic
Years	League	Role

International
Years	League	Role
2004–2016	FIFA	Referee

Marijo Strahonja is a Croatian former association football referee who also worked as television analyst of referee decisions on Croatian Radiotelevision .

Since 2004 he has officiated internationals.

Strahonja has served as a referee in qualifying matches for Euro 2012, as well as 2010 and 2014 World Cup qualifiers.

His last important appearance was in Europa League 2015 on match day 1 between Asteras and Sparta Prague.
