= Osijek–Rijeka derby =

- Location: Croatia
- Teams: Osijek and Rijeka
- Latest meeting: Rijeka 4–1 Osijek; 2026–27 SuperSport HNL (5 September 2026)
- Next meeting: 28 November 2026

Statistics
- Total meetings: 161 (136 league)
- Most wins: Rijeka (63)
- Top scorer: Ahmad Sharbini (9)

Osijek–Rijeka derby (Croatian: derbi Osijek – Rijeka) is the name given to matches between NK Osijek and HNK Rijeka. On Croatian First Football League all-time table Rijeka and Osijek are on the third and fourth place. Rijeka is the third-most successful Croatian football club, having won twp Croatian Football League titles, seven Croatian Football Cups, two Yugoslav Cups, one Croatian Football Super Cup and the 1977–78 Balkans Cup. Osijek won one Croatian Football Cup.

Rijeka and Osijek are with Dinamo Zagreb and Hajduk Split the only four clubs that have never been relegated from the Croatian First League.

Osijek and Rijeka are third and fourth best supported football clubs in Croatia. Osijek is supported by 5% and Rijeka by 4% of population.

The teams are supported by their ultras groups called Armada Rijeka and Kohorta Osijek.

== Supporters ==
Armada is football ultras group that support HNK Rijeka. They also support Rijeka's other sports clubs, such as RK Zamet (handball), Primorje EB (waterpolo) and KK Kvarner 2010 (basketball).

The name Armada was given in 1987 at a bar in the "Ri" shopping mall in Rijeka, and the first game attended by the Armada was the Final of the Yugoslav football cup against Hajduk Split in Belgrade on 9 May 1987. The newly formed supporters group named themselves after the Spanish Armada because of the strength they showed in their support. Their fiercest rivals are BBB (Bad Blue Boys), Torcida and Kohorta.

At home games, Armada members gather in the west stand at Stadion Kantrida and in the last few years in the north stand of Stadion Rujevica, from where they fiercely support their club. They also regularly support Rijeka in the club's away games. They regularly display choreographies and light up flares.

Their mottos are: Sami protiv svih - Alone against everybody, and Krepat, ma ne molat - Die but not give up. Armada's mascot is a shark.

Kohorta Osijek is a group of supporters of Croatian soccer club NK Osijek. During the soccer match it is located on the southeast and east stands of the Gradski vrt stadium in Osijek.

== Results ==
=== By competition ===
Competition	Played	Rijeka wins	Draws	Osijek wins	Rijeka goals	Osijek goals
Yugoslav championship (1946–1991)
First League	26	11	7	8	37	30
Second League	8	4	1	3	22	16
First League qualifiers	4	0	2	2	2	6
Yugoslav Cup	2	0	1	1	1	2
Yugoslavia totals	40	15	11	14	62	54
Croatian championship (1992–present)
Prva HNL	110	41	30	39	141	125
Croatian Cup	11	7	0	4	16	12
Supercup	0	0	0	0	0	0
Croatia totals	121	48	30	43	157	137
All Time	161	63	41	57	219	191

=== By ground (Croatia only) ===
Ground	Played	Rijeka wins	Draws	Osijek wins	Rijeka goals	Osijek goals
Gradski Vrt, Osijek	54	13	13	28	49	75
Kantrida, Rijeka	34	18	8	8	54	30
Rujevica, Rijeka	26	15	7	4	48	26
Opus Arena, Osijek	6	2	2	2	4	3
Jedinstvo, Donji Miholjac	1	0	0	1	2	3
All Time	121	48	30	43	157	137

Last updated: 5 September 2026.

== List of matches ==
=== Key ===
Match ended in a draw
Rijeka win
Osijek win

=== 1977–1991 ===
M	Date	Competition	Ground	Score	Osijek scorers	Rijeka scorers
1	14 Aug 1977	Div. 1	Kantrida	1–2		Durkalić
2	11 Dec 1977	Div. 1	Gradski vrt	1–1		Radović
3	27 Aug 1978	Div. 1	Gradski vrt	0–0		
4	25 Mar 1979	Div. 1	Kantrida	3–3		Radin, Cukrov, Ružić
5	19 Aug 1979	Div. 1	Kantrida	0–0		
6	20 Apr 1980	Div. 1	Gradski vrt	2–0		
7	29 Aug 1981	Div. 1	Kantrida	3–1		Desnica, Tomić (2)
8	14 Mar 1982	Div. 1	Gradski vrt	4–0		
9	12 Sep 1982	Div. 1	Kantrida	5–2		Lukić, Gračan, Malbaša, Desnica, Fegic
10	10 Apr 1983	Div. 1	Gradski vrt	2–0		
11	16 Oct 1983	Div. 1	Gradski vrt	4–1		o.g.
12	29 Apr 1984	Div. 1	Kantrida	4–1		Tomić (2), Matrljan, Fegic
13	9 Dec 1984	Div. 1	Kantrida	5–0		Fegic (2), Gračan, Radmanović, Malbaša
14	30 Jun 1985	Div. 1	Gradski vrt	2–2		Gračan (2)
15	3 Nov 1985	Div. 1	Gradski vrt	0–0		
16	28 May 1986	Div. 1	Kantrida	1–0		Malbaša
17	2 Nov 1986	Div. 1	Kantrida	2–1		J. Janković, Matrljan
18	13 May 1987	Div. 1	Gradski vrt	1–0		
19	27 Sep 1987	Div. 1	Gradski vrt	1–0		
20	20 Apr 1988	Div. 1	Kantrida	0–0		
21	7 Aug 1988	Div. 1	Gradski vrt	1–3		Valenčić, Kljajić, Mladenović
22	26 Feb 1989	Div. 1	Kantrida	2–0		Ekmeščić (2)
23	3 Dec 1989	Div. 1	Gradski vrt	0–1		Vulić
24	16 May 1990	Div. 1	Kantrida	1–0		S. Beširević
25	26 Aug 1990	Div. 1	Gradski vrt	2–0		
26	10 Mar 1991	Div. 1	Kantrida	2–0		Punišić, Nestorović

=== 1992–present ===
M	Date	Competition	Ground	Score	Osijek scorers	Rijeka scorers	Attendance	Report
1	31 Mar 1992	1. HNL	Kantrida	2–0		Ban, Ljubančić	1,000	prvahnl.hr
2	26 May 1992	1. HNL	Jedinstvo	3–2	Petrović (2), Bajsić	Šanjug, Šarić	1,000	
3	25 Oct 1992	1. HNL	Gradski vrt	1–1	B. Beširević	D. Tadić	5,000	
4	9 May 1993	1. HNL	Kantrida	2–0		Scoria (2)	1,500	
5	30 Oct 1993	1. HNL	Kantrida	1–1	Labak	Mladenović	400	
6	8 May 1994	1. HNL	Gradski vrt	2–0	Vukoja, Katić		8,000	
7	28 Aug 1994	1. HNL	Kantrida	0–1	Bičanić		1,000	
8	8 Mar 1995	Cup (QF)	Gradski vrt	1–0	Vukoja		6,000	
9	12 Mar 1995	1. HNL	Gradski vrt	2–0	Špehar, Vukoja		12,000	
10	5 Apr 1995	Cup (QF)	Kantrida	1–0 (2–4 p)		J. Samardžić	2,500	
11	24 Sep 1995	1. HNL	Kantrida	0–2	Bičanić, Krpan		2,000	
12	17 Dec 1995	1. HNL	Gradski vrt	1–0	Bičanić		3,000	
13	8 Sep 1996	1. HNL	Gradski vrt	4–0	Popescu, Mitu (3)		1,500	
14	23 Mar 1997	1. HNL	Kantrida	2–0		Brkić, Seferović	3,500	
15	31 Aug 1997	1. HNL	Kantrida	1–1	Krpan	Vranješ-og	5,000	
16	29 Nov 1997	1. HNL	Gradski vrt	2–0	B. Beširević, Fischer		1,500	
17	30 Aug 1998	1. HNL	Gradski vrt	1–0	Bubalo		2,500	
18	29 Nov 1998	1. HNL	Kantrida	1–0		Balaban	6,000	
19	9 May 1999	1. HNL	Gradski vrt	5–2	Perković (3), Bubalo, Prišć	Hasančić, Balaban	2,500	
20	26 May 1999	1. HNL	Kantrida	1–1	Bubalo	Musa	22,000	
21	24 Jul 1999	1. HNL	Kantrida	0–1	Bubalo		5,000	
22	30 Oct 1999	1. HNL	Gradski vrt	3–2	Turković, Ergović, Bubalo	Agić, Hasančić	1,000	
23	22 Apr 2000	1. HNL	Gradski vrt	2–0	Krstulović, Grnja		2,500	
24	29 Aug 2000	1. HNL	Gradski vrt	1–2	Turković	Milicic, Brajković	3,000	
25	17 Nov 2000	1. HNL	Kantrida	2–3	Prišć, B. Beširević, Bjelica	Čaval (2)	2,000	
26	12 Aug 2001	1. HNL	Kantrida	4–0		Skočibušić, Čačić, Matulović, Vidović	2,500	
27	2 Feb 2002	1. HNL	Gradski vrt	1–0	Turković		800	
28	25 Aug 2002	1. HNL	Kantrida	0–1	Balatinac		4,500	
29	23 Nov 2002	1. HNL	Gradski vrt	1–1	Špehar	Klić	600	
30	3 May 2003	1. HNL	Kantrida	0–0			1,200	
31	31 May 2003	1. HNL	Gradski vrt	3–2	Pavličić (2), Božinovski	Brajković (2)	300	
32	30 Aug 2003	1. HNL	Kantrida	2–0		Duro, Klić	3,000	
33	6 Dec 2003	1. HNL	Gradski vrt	2–3	Špehar (2)	Butić, Čaval, Ah. Sharbini	2,000	
34	27 Mar 2004	1. HNL	Kantrida	2–1	Špehar	Ah. Sharbini, Vidović	2,000	
35	24 Apr 2004	1. HNL	Gradski vrt	2–1	D. Knežević-og, Prijić	J. Samardžić	2,000	
36	29 Aug 2004	1. HNL	Kantrida	4–0		Erceg, D. Tadić, Katulić	3,000	
37	27 Nov 2004	1. HNL	Gradski vrt	1–1	J. Tadić	Novaković	3,000	
38	14 Aug 2005	1. HNL	Gradski vrt	0–1		Ivančić	5,000	
39	5 Nov 2005	1. HNL	Kantrida	4–1	Milardović	Ah. Sharbini (2), Vugrinec, Novaković	2,000	
40	8 Apr 2006	1. HNL	Kantrida	3–1	J. Barišić	Rendulić, Linić, Ah. Sharbini	4,000	
41	10 May 2006	1. HNL	Gradski vrt	0–2		Linić (2)	2,000	
42	16 Sep 2006	1. HNL	Kantrida	2–2	Milardović, Buljan	Ah. Sharbini, Linić	2,000	
43	2 Dec 2006	1. HNL	Gradski vrt	1–0	Pavličić		1,000	
44	18 Apr 2007	1. HNL	Kantrida	0–2	Jukić (2)		1,000	
45	4 Aug 2007	1. HNL	Gradski vrt	2–2	Jukić, Babić	Đalović, Bule	5,000	
46	31 Oct 2007	1. HNL	Kantrida	1–1	Hrnčević	Đalović	2,000	
47	12 Apr 2008	1. HNL	Gradski vrt	1–0	Smoje		1,000	
48	21 Sep 2008	1. HNL	Kantrida	0–0			1,500	
49	22 Feb 2009	1. HNL	Gradski vrt	2–2	Primorac, Vidaković	Ah. Sharbini, An. Sharbini	1,500	
50	17 May 2009	1. HNL	Gradski vrt	1–2	J. Knežević	Ah. Sharbini (2)	1,500	
51	17 Oct 2009	1. HNL	Kantrida	1–1	Jugović	Čulina	1,000	
52	17 Apr 2010	1. HNL	Gradski vrt	1–0	J. Barišić		1,500	
53	23 Oct 2010	1. HNL	Kantrida	1–5	Miličević, Smoje, Šorša, Nikšić, Škorić	Štrok	1,500	
54	30 Apr 2011	1. HNL	Gradski vrt	0–0			1,500	
55	22 Jul 2011	1. HNL	Gradski vrt	1–1	Ljubojević	Dedić	1,500	
56	23 Nov 2011	Cup (QF)	Kantrida	1–2	Kvržić (2)	Alférez	1,500	
57	26 Nov 2011	1. HNL	Gradski vrt	0–1		Kreilach	1,000	
58	30 Nov 2011	Cup (QF)	Gradski vrt	2–0	Kvržić, Maglica		600	
59	18 Aug 2012	1. HNL	Gradski vrt	1–1	Perošević	Mujanović	1,000	
60	18 Nov 2012	1. HNL	Kantrida	3–1	Zubak	Brezovec, Cesarec (2)	3,000	
61	6 Apr 2013	1. HNL	Kantrida	1–0		Benko	4,000	
62	12 Aug 2013	1. HNL	Kantrida	5–1	Lulić	Benko (2), Alispahić (2), Pokrivač	6,000	
63	27 Oct 2013	1. HNL	Gradski vrt	1–3	Novaković	Kvržić, Kramarić, Močinić	3,000	
64	19 Feb 2014	Cup (QF)	Kantrida	1–0		Moisés	3,000	
65	23 Feb 2014	1. HNL	Kantrida	1–0		Benko	4,000	
66	12 Mar 2014	Cup (QF)	Gradski vrt	1–0 (3–4 p)	Dugandžić		3,000	
67	19 Apr 2014	1. HNL	Gradski vrt	2–0	J. Barišić, Jonjić		3,000	
68	13 Sep 2014	1. HNL	Gradski vrt	0–1		Jugović	1,500	
69	1 Dec 2014	1. HNL	Kantrida	2–1	Jonjić	M. Samardžić, Moisés	4,000	
70	20 Mar 2015	1. HNL	Gradski vrt	0–0			2,000	
71	23 May 2015	1. HNL	Kantrida	3–0		Balaj, An. Sharbini, Tomasov	5,500	
72	30 Aug 2015	1. HNL	Rujevica	5–0		Balaj (2), Bezjak, Mitrović, An. Sharbini	4,729	prvahnl.hr
73	21 Nov 2015	1. HNL	Gradski vrt	1–1	Škorić	Bezjak	517	prvahnl.hr
74	6 Mar 2016	1. HNL	Rujevica	2–1	Perošević	Gavranović, Bezjak	3,736	prvahnl.hr
75	7 May 2016	1. HNL	Gradski vrt	1–1	Lukić	Gavranović	1,712	prvahnl.hr
76	31 Jul 2016	1. HNL	Gradski vrt	0–1		Mišić	4,019	prvahnl.hr
77	16 Oct 2016	1. HNL	Rujevica	3–0		Andrijašević, Gavranović, Gorgon	5,430	prvahnl.hr
78	19 Feb 2017	1. HNL	Gradski vrt	2–3	Lyopa, Ejupi	Gavranović, Andrijašević (2)	4,219	prvahnl.hr
79	1 Mar 2017	Cup (SF)	Rujevica	3–1	Perošević	Gavranović (3)	5,105	hns-cff.hr
80	15 Mar 2017	Cup (SF)	Gradski vrt	0–2		Škorić-og, Andrijašević	4,467	hns-cff.hr
81	25 Apr 2017	1. HNL	Rujevica	2–0		Bezjak, Andrijašević	5,072	prvahnl.hr
82	7 Aug 2017	1. HNL	Gradski vrt	1–0	B. Barišić		5,155	prvahnl.hr
83	22 Oct 2017	1. HNL	Rujevica	1–2	Grezda, Bočkaj	Gavranović	3,022	prvahnl.hr
84	17 Feb 2018	1. HNL	Gradski vrt	2–1	Grgić, Hajradinović	Pavičić	3,125	prvahnl.hr
85	21 Apr 2018	1. HNL	Rujevica	1–0		Puljić	5,101	prvahnl.hr
86	16 Sep 2018	1. HNL	Rujevica	1–1	Bočkaj	Héber	5,127	prvahnl.hr
87	1 Dec 2018	1. HNL	Gradski vrt	1–2	Šorša	Čolak (2)	2,134	prvahnl.hr
88	17 Mar 2019	1. HNL	Rujevica	3–1	Ejupi	Halilović, Lepinjica, Puljić	4,347	prvahnl.hr
89	15 May 2019	1. HNL	Gradski vrt	2–1	Marić (2)	Čolak	2,032	prvahnl.hr
90	18 Aug 2019	1. HNL	Rujevica	1–1	Žaper	Čolak	4,832	prvahnl.hr
91	3 Nov 2019	1. HNL	Gradski vrt	3–2	Marić, Lyopa, Žaper	Čolak, Župarić	3,550	prvahnl.hr
92	22 Feb 2020	1. HNL	Rujevica	1–0		Gorgon	5,204	prvahnl.hr
93	31 May 2020	Cup (SF)	Rujevica	3–2	Bočkaj (2)	Murić, Čolak, Yatéké	0	hns-cff.hr
94	1 Jul 2020	1. HNL	Gradski vrt	1–0	Mance		3,026	prvahnl.hr
95	12 Sep 2020	1. HNL	Gradski vrt	3–0	Jugović, Bočkaj, Miérez		0	prvahnl.hr
96	29 Nov 2020	1. HNL	Rujevica	1–1	Bočkaj	Andrijašević	0	prvahnl.hr
97	21 Feb 2021	1. HNL	Gradski vrt	2–0	Miérez (2)		0	prvahnl.hr
98	3 Mar 2021	Cup (QF)	Gradski vrt	1–2	Škorić	Murić (2)	0	hns-cff.hr
99	25 Apr 2021	1. HNL	Rujevica	0–0			0	prvahnl.hr
100	16 Aug 2021	1. HNL	Gradski vrt	1–0	Miérez		2,069	prvahnl.hr
101	8 Dec 2021	1. HNL	Rujevica	0–0			3,631	prvahnl.hr
102	13 Feb 2022	1. HNL	Gradski vrt	1–0	Čestić-og		3,406	prvahnl.hr
103	9 Mar 2022	Cup (SF)	Rujevica	3–2 (aet)	Caktaš, Mance	Krešić, Drmić, Merkulov	7,225	hns-cff.hr
104	23 Apr 2022	1. HNL	Rujevica	3–1	Mance	Murić, Vučkić, Drmić	4,516	prvahnl.hr
105	10 Sep 2022	HNL	Rujevica	0–3	Miérez, Caktaš (2)		3,825	hnl.hr
106	21 Jan 2023	HNL	Gradski vrt	1–1	Špoljarić	Frigan	2,082	hnl.hr
107	2 Apr 2023	HNL	Rujevica	1–1	Žaper	Frigan	5,864	hnl.hr
108	27 May 2023	HNL	Gradski vrt	1–1	Mitrović-og	Banda	11,522	hnl.hr
109	16 Sep 2023	HNL	Rujevica	2–1	Pušić	Pjaca (2)	6,373	hnl.hr
110	2 Dec 2023	HNL	Opus Arena	0–0			7,425	hnl.hr
111	10 Mar 2024	HNL	Rujevica	3–0		Hodža (3)	6,718	hnl.hr
112	19 May 2024	HNL	Opus Arena	2–0	Jurišić, Matković		10,112	hnl.hr
113	25 Aug 2024	HNL	Opus Arena	0–2		Radeljić, Pašalić	7,014	hnl.hr
114	10 Nov 2024	HNL	Rujevica	1–1	Hasić	Fruk	5,106	hnl.hr
115	16 Feb 2025	HNL	Opus Arena	0–2		Čop, N. Janković	4,780	hnl.hr
116	23 Apr 2025	HNL	Rujevica	0–2	Omerović, Soldo		5,704	hnl.hr
117	9 Aug 2025	HNL	Opus Arena	0–0			6,132	hnl.hr
118	27 Oct 2025	HNL	Rujevica	4–2	Mikolčić, Farkaš	Fruk, Čop (2), Devetak	5,096	hnl.hr
119	1 Feb 2026	HNL	Opus Arena	1–0	Akere		3,262	hnl.hr
120	12 Apr 2026	HNL	Rujevica	0–2	Akere, Omerović		4,919	hnl.hr
121	5 Sep 2026	HNL	Rujevica	4–1	Armando León	Adu-Adjei (2), Vignato, Fruk	4,506	hnl.hr

== Yugoslav First League results (1946–1991) ==
The tables list the place each team took in each of the seasons.

	46–47	47–48	48–49	1950	1951	1952	52–53	53–54	54–55	55–56	56–57	57–58	58–59	59–60	60–61	61–62	62–63	63–64	64–65	65–66	66–67	67–68	68–69
No. of teams	14	10	10	10	12	12	12	14	14	14	14	14	12	12	12	12	14	14	15	16	16	16	18
Osijek								10	12	14													
Rijeka	9												8	8	7	8	10	9	4	4	11	16	17

	69–70	70–71	71–72	72–73	73–74	74–75	75–76	76–77	77–78	78–79	79–80	80–81	81–82	82–83	83–84	84–85	85–86	86–87	87–88	88–89	89–90	90–91
No. of teams	18	18	18	18	18	18	18	18	18	18	18	18	18	18	18	18	18	18	18	18	18	19
Osijek									13	13	17		16	16	6	12	9	11	11	8	16	9
Rijeka						14	11	5	5	10	10	7	12	15	4	8	5	4	8	10	6	15

== HNL results ==
The tables list the place each team took in each of the seasons.

	1992	92–93	93–94	94–95	95–96	96–97	97–98	98–99	99–00	00–01	01–02	02–03	03–04	04–05	05–06	06–07	07–08
No. of teams	12	16	18	16	12	16	12	12	12	12	16	12	12	12	12	12	12
Osijek	3	6	8	3	3	8	3	4	3	3	8	8	4	8	4	6	3
Rijeka	6	4	6	11	9	4	7	2	4	10	5	9	3	4	2	7	4

	08–09	09–10	10–11	11–12	12–13	13–14	14–15	15–16	16–17	17–18	18–19	19–20	20–21	21–22	22–23	23–24	24–25	25–26
No. of teams	12	16	16	16	12	10	10	10	10	10	10	10	10	10	10	10	10	10
Osijek	7	5	8	8	7	8	8	8	4	4	3	4	2	3	3	4	7	9
Rijeka	3	9	9	12	3	2	2	2	1	2	2	3	3	4	4	2	1	4

== See also ==
- Eternal derby
- Adriatic derby
- Dinamo–Rijeka derby
