= Curva =

Curved stands of seating located at sports stadiums

Curva [ˈkurva] (plural: curve [ˈkurve]) is an Italian term or name for curved stands of seating located at sports stadiums, particularly in Italy; so named, originally, due to their curved or bending shape. The curva plays an integral part in the culture of Ultras and European football.

== Composition ==
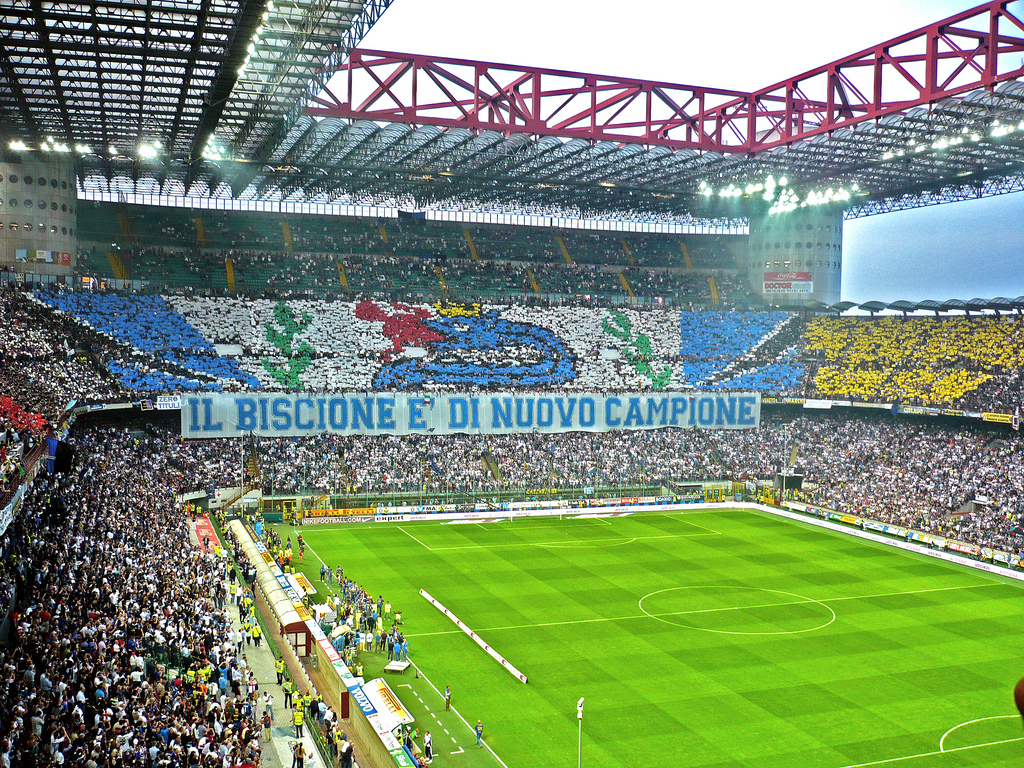
Inter Milan Fans in Curva Nord Milano

The majority of stands referred to as a "curva" are located behind the goals in their respective stadiums and contain the most vocal supporters within them, often known as Ultras. They are usually curved in shape, in some form whether minor or major, often due to the presence of a running track around the pitch. San Siro provides an example of two prominent stands referred to as "curva", "Curva Nord" and "Curva Sud", which contain only minor curves at their corners, while the Stadio Olimpico provides an example of two completely curved stands. A curva may extend from one corner flag to another or be located centrally behind the goal, bordered by two separate corner sections for ticketing or organizational purposes.

== Significance ==
A.S. Roma Fans in Curva Sud

Being home to the most openly passionate supporters in a stadium, the curva is usually the focal point of a club's support. It is often the scene of dramatic choreographed displays of support and occasionally, disapproval for a team or club. These displays often take on an importance of their own, particularly in games involving rivals where both sets of supporters aim to outdo each other. In certain countries, particularly those where sports clubs and supporters are extremely reflective of the local culture, the curva can become quite politicised in nature. Therefore, it is not uncommon for a curva to be split into individual factions or groups, either solely or partially, based on politics, and for one group to hold significant control of the curva and its inhabitants on match days. Ultras groups within a curva often benefit from this degree of relative uniformity, when there are issues regarding supporters' rights and the commercialisation of sports and football in particular.

== Locations ==
=== Algeria ===
Stadium	Club	Stand
July 5, 1962 Stadium	MC Alger	Ultras The Twelfth Player 2011, Ultras Green Corsairs 2012, Ultra' Amoré E Montalita / Virage Sud
May 19, 1956 Stadium	USM Annaba	Les indepandants de bone 12 / Curva Nord
Stade 20 Août 1955, Skikda	JSM Skikda	Ultras Guardie Nere, Ultra' Capitano, Gruppo Marinai 21 / Curva Sud Skikda
July 5, 1962 Stadium	USM Alger	Les Unionistes Algérois, El Assima / Virage Algérois
Mohamed Hamlaoui Stadium, Constantine	CS Constantine	Ultras Green Army 12 / Curva Nord
November 1, 1954 Stadium (Tizi Ouzou), Tizi-Ouzou	JS Kabylie	Ultra Kabylie Boys 09 / Curva Nord
August 20, 1955 Stadium (Algiers),	CR Belouizdad	Ultras Fanatic Reds 09 / Volcana
Stade 8 Mai 1945, Setif	ES Setif	Ultras Inferno 10, Les Fidèles, Ultras Gladiator / Curva Nord
Ahmed Zabana Stadium	MC Oran	Ultras Red Castle / Zona Oranostra
Mohamed Boumezrag Stadium, Chlef	ASO Chlef	Ultras Polina 2010 / Curva Sud Chlef
Nelson Mandela Stadium, Alger	USM El Harrach	Ultra' Combattiva/ Curva Harrachia
November 1, 1954 Stadium (Batna), Batna	MSP Batna	Les Genie / Curva Toxic
November 1, 1954 Stadium (Batna), Batna	CA Batna	Ultra Autochtones/ Curva Awras
Maghrebi Unity Stadium	MO Béjaïa	Ultras Granchio / Curva Majica
Maghrebi Unity Stadium	JSM Béjaïa	Couvert A La Prima/ Curva Furia
August 20, 1955 Stadium (Algiers)	NA Hussein Dey	Ultra Dey Boys / Curva Razzista
Stade Imam Lyes de Médéa	Olympique de Médéa	Ultras Olympic Medea/ Curva Blues
Stade Akid Lotfi	WA Tlemcen	Ultras Kop 13 / Curva Nord

=== Austria ===
Stadium	Club	Stand
Allianz Stadion	SK Rapid Wien	Block West

=== Bulgaria ===
Stadium	Club	Stand
Georgi Asparuhov Stadium	Levski Sofia	Sektor B / Juzhnata Tribuna / South Stand
Bulgarian Army Stadium	CSKA Sofia	Sektor G / Severnata Tribuna / North Stand
Hristo Botev Stadium (Plovdiv)	Botev Plovdiv	Tribuna Iztok / Tribune East / East Stand
Lokomotiv Stadium (Plovdiv)	Lokomotiv Plovdiv	Tribuna Besika / Tribune Bessica / North Stand

=== Bosnia and Herzegovina ===
Stadium	Club	Stand
Stadion Asim Ferhatović Hase	Sarajevo	"Vedran Puljić"-Sjever / North Stand
Stadion Grbavica	Željezničar	Sector C-Jug / South Stand
Stadion Bilino polje	Čelik	Jug / South Stand
Tušanj City Stadium	Sloboda	Sjever / North Stand
Banja Luka City Stadium	Borac	Sjever / North Stand
Gradski SRC Slavija	Stadion SRC Slavija	Jug / South Stand

=== China ===
Stadium	Club	Stand	Group
CSUFT East-Garden Stadium	Hunan Billows	Curva Nord	Bad Billows Boys

=== Croatia ===
Stadium	Club	Stand	Group
Stadion Maksimir	Dinamo Zagreb	North Stand / Sjever	Bad Blue Boys
Stadion Poljud	HNK Hajduk Split	North Stand / Sjever	Torcida
Stadion Kantrida	HNK Rijeka	West Stand / Zapad	Armada
Stadion Gradski Vrt	NK Osijek	SouthEast/East Stand /Jugoistok/Istok	Kohorta
Stadion Alde Drosine	NK Istra 1961	North Stand / Sjever	Demoni

=== Cyprus ===
Stadium	Club	Stand
GSP Stadium	AC Omonia Nicosia	North Stand/Gate-9
GSP Stadium	APOEL FC	South Stand/AU79
Tsirion Stadium	AEL Limassol	East Stand/Gate-3
Tsirion Stadium	Apollon Limassol	West Stand/Gate-1
Antonis Papadopoulos Stadium	Anorthosis Famagusta FC	South Stand/Maxhtec

=== Denmark ===
Stadium	Club	Stand
Aalborg Portland Park	Aalborg BK	Vesttribunen
Blue Water Arena	Esbjerg fB	Nordvestkurve
Viborg Stadion	Viborg FF	Sydtribunen
Brøndby Stadion	Brøndby IF	Sydsiden (earlier Faxetribunen)
Parken	FC Copenhagen	Sektion 12
Nature Energy Park	Odense BK	Stiften
Ceres Park	Aarhus GF	Stemningsafsnit (B1-B2)
Right to Dream Park	FC Nordsjælland	Red Zone (D-Tribunen)

=== Egypt ===
Stadium	Club	Stand
Cairo International Stadium	Al Ahly SC	Ultras Ahlawy/Curva Nord
Cairo International Stadium	Zamalek SC	Ultras White Knights/Curva Sud
Port Said Stadium	Al-Masry SC	Ultras Green Eagles
Suez Stadium	Suez Montakhab	Ultras Suez Fedyan
Ghazl El Mahalla Stadium	Ghazl El Mahalla SC	Ultras Whales 2008
Ismailia Stadium	Ismaily SC	Ultras Yellow Dragons
Alexandria Stadium	Al Ittihad Alexandria Club	Ultras Green Magic

=== Finland ===
Stadium	Club	Stand
Helsinki Olympic Stadium	Finland national football team	Pohjoiskaarre
Bolt Arena	HIFK Helsinki	Klacken
Bolt Arena	HJK Helsinki	Klubipääty

=== France ===
Stadium	Club	Stand
Stade Armand Cesari	SC Bastia	Est/Petrignani
Stade Chaban-Delmas	Girondins de Bordeaux	Virage Sud
Stade Vélodrome	Olympique de Marseille	Virage Nord/Sud
Parc des Princes	Paris Saint-Germain FC	Kop of Boulogne/Virage Auteuil

=== Germany ===
Stadium	Club	Stand
Signal Iduna Park	Borussia Dortmund	Südtribüne/Gelbe Wand
Olympiastadion/Allianz Arena	Bayern München	Südkurve
Volkswagen Arena	Wolfsburg	Nordkurve
Commerzbank-Arena	Eintracht Frankfurt	Nordwestkurve
Fritz-Walter-Stadion	1. FC Kaiserslautern	Westkurve
Max Morlock Stadion	1. FC Nürnberg	Nordkurve
AWD-Arena	Hannover 96	Nordkurve
Weserstadion	Werder Bremen	Ostkurve
Olympiastadion	Hertha BSC	Ostkurve Hertha BSC
Veltins-Arena	FC Schalke 04	Nordkurve
Borussia Park	Borussia Mönchengladbach	Nordkurve
BayArena	Bayer 04 Leverkusen	Nordkurve

=== Greece ===
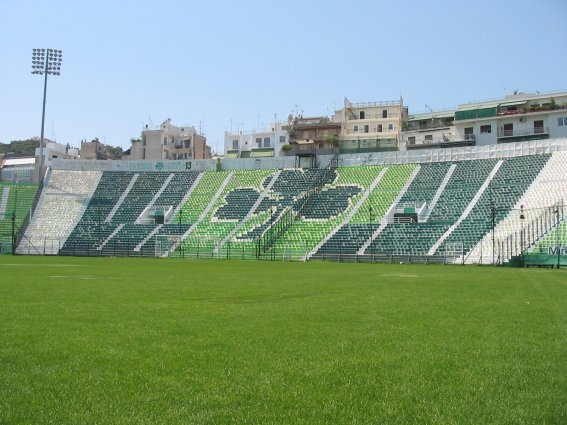
Gate 13

Stadium	Club	Stand
Peristeri Stadium	Atromitos	Fentagin
Leoforos Alexandras Stadium	Panathinaikos	Gate 13
Karaiskakis Stadium	Olympiacos F.C.	Gate 7
Toumba Stadium	PAOK	Gate 4
Agia Sophia Stadium	AEK Athens	Original 21
Kleanthis Vikelidis Stadium	Aris	Super-3
Kaftanzoglio Stadium	Iraklis	Autonomous Gate 10
AEL FC Arena	AEL	Monsters Gate 1
Genti Koule	OFI	Snakes Gate 4
Nea Smyrni Stadium	Panionios	Panthers Gate 3

India

Stadium	Club	Stand
Salt Lake Stadium, East Bengal Ground	East Bengal F.C.	Curva Nord

=== Indonesia ===
Stadium	Club	Stand
Ile Mandiri Stadium	Perseftim Flores Timur	CURVA SUD Flores Timur
Gelora Bandung Lautan Api Stadium	Persib Bandung	Northern Wall
Gelora Bung Karno Stadium	Persija Jakarta	Curva Nord Persija
Maguwoharjo Stadium	PSS Sleman	Brigata Curva Sud
Gelora Bung Tomo Stadium	Persebaya 1927	Green Nord
Tridharma Petrokima Stadium	Gresik United	Ultras Gresik Curva Sud
Gelora Delta Stadium	Deltras F.C.	Curva North
Mandala Krida Stadium	PSIM Yogyakarta	Mataram Independent 1929
Rumbai Stadium	PSPS Pekanbaru	Curva Nord
Surajaya Stadium	Persela Lamongan	Curva Boys 1967
Persikabo Stadium	Persikabo Bogor	Curva Sud
Wijayakusuma Stadium	PSCS Cilacap	Curva Nord Squadra 1950
Benteng Stadium	Persita Tangerang	North Legion
Brawijaya Stadium	Persik Kediri	Curva Nord
Kanjuruhan Stadium	Arema Cronous F.C.	Curva Sud 1987
Hoegeng Stadium	Persip Pekalongan	Curva Sud BBC
Gelora Bumi Kartini Stadium	Persijap Jepara	Curva Nord Syndicate
Goentoer Darjono Stadium	Persibangga Purbalingga	Braling Mania Curva Nord
Sultan Agung Stadium	Persiba Bantul	Curva Nord Famiglia X 1967
Letjen Haji Sudirman Stadium	Persibo Bojonegoro	Curva Nord 1949
Mahakam Stadium	Depok United F.C.	Curva Nord
Manahan Stadium	Persis Solo F.C.	Curva Nord
Merpati Stadium	Persikad Depok	Curva Nord
Madya Stadium	PPSM Kartika Nusantara	Gate 3
Haji Agus Salim Stadium	Semen Padang F.C.	Curva Sud UWS

=== Ireland ===
Stadium	Club	Stand
Turner's Cross	Cork City FC	The Shed End

=== Italy ===
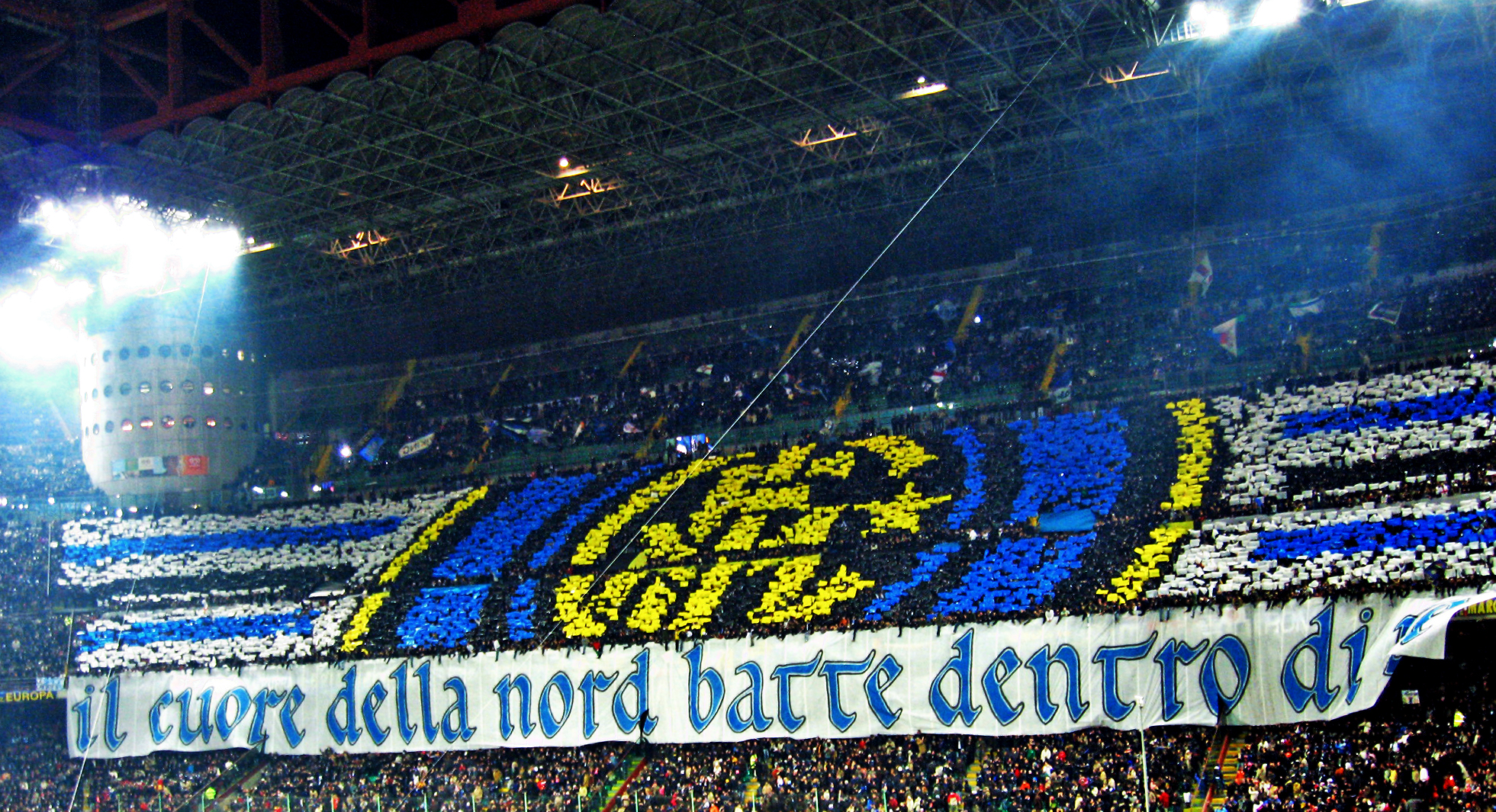
Curva Nord Milano

Stadium	Club	Stand
Juventus Stadium	Juventus	Curva Sud / Curva Scirea
Arena Garibaldi	Pisa	Curva Nord Maurizio Alberti
San Siro	Inter Milan	Curva Nord Milano
San Siro	AC Milan	Curva Sud
Stadio Artemio Franchi	Fiorentina	Curva Fiesole
Stadio Atleti Azzurri d'Italia	Atalanta	Curva Pisani
Stadio Brianteo	Monza	Curva Sud / Curva Davide Pieri
Stadio Ennio Tardini	Parma	Curva Nord
Stadio Luigi Ferraris	Genoa	Gradinata Nord
Stadio Luigi Ferraris	Sampdoria	Gradinata Sud
Stadio Marc'Antonio Bentegodi	ChievoVerona	Curva Nord
Stadio Marc'Antonio Bentegodi	Hellas Verona	Curva Sud
Stadio Olimpico	Lazio	Curva Nord
Stadio Olimpico	Roma	Curva Sud
Stadio Olimpico Grande Torino	Torino	Curva Maratona
Stadio Partenio A. Lombardi	Avellino	Curva Sud
Stadio Renato Dall'Ara	Bologna	Curva Bulgarelli
Stadio Diego Armando Maradona	Napoli	Curva A/Curva B
Stadio San Nicola	Bari	Curva Nord
Stadio Angelo Massimino	Catania	Curva Nord
Stadio Nicola Ceravolo	Catanzaro	Curva Massimo Capraro
Stadio Sant'Elia	Cagliari	Curva Nord
Stadio Mario Rigamonti	Brescia	Curva Nord
Stadio Friuli	Udinese	Curva Nord
Stadio Franco Ossola	Varese	Curva Nord
Stadio Arechi	Salernitana	Curva Sud Siberiano

=== Malaysia ===
Stadium	Team/Club	Stand	Group
Stadium Nasional Bukit Jalil	Malaysia National Football Team	Curva Ultras Malaya 07	Ultras Malaya
Stadium Bolasepak Kuala Lumpur	Kuala Lumpur Football Team	Droogs Curva	Kuala Lumpur Ultras (the Cityboys)
Shah Alam Stadium	Selangor FA	Green Curva Nord	UltraSel
Stadium Perak	Perak FA	Silvermania Curva / Belang Tarung Tiga Warna	Silver State Ultras
Stadium Negeri	Sarawak FA	Curva Distrixtigabelas	GB-13
Darul Makmur Stadium	Pahang FA	Curva Sebelas	Elephant Army
Tan Sri Dato Haji Hassan Yunos Stadium	Johor Darul Ta'zim FC	Curva Nord	Boys Of Straits
Stadium Majlis Perbadanan Pasir Gudang	Johor Darul Ta'zim II FC	Nord Stand	Boys Of Straits
Sultan Muhammad IV Stadium	Kelantan FA		Gate H Boys
Darul Aman Stadium	Kedah FA	Terrace 1- T1	Ultras Kedah
Likas Stadium	Sabah FA		North Borneo Ultras
Stadium Sultan Mizan Zainal Abiddin	Terengganu FA	Curva Gong Badak	Ultras Tranung

=== Malta ===
Stadium	Club	Stand
Ta' Qali Stadium	Valletta F.C.	Ultras Beltin 999
Ta' Qali Stadium	Birkirkara F.C.	Ultras Birkirkara 97
Hibernians Stadium	Hibernians F.C.	Paola Boys Hibs Ultras 07
Sirens Stadium	Sirens F.C.	Ultras Sireni 16
Centenary Stadium	Marsa F.C.	Ultras Marsin 10
Ta' Qali Stadium	Sliema Wanderers F.C.	Sliema Ultras 2008
Centenary Stadium	Tarxien Rainbows F.C.	Tarxien Ultras 2014
Gozo Stadium	Xewkija Tigers F.C.	12th Tiger Supporters Club
Gozo Stadium	Nadur Youngsters F.C.	White Force Nadur Ultras
Gozo Stadium	Ghajnsielem F.C.	Black Pride 2007
Gozo Stadium	Xaghra United F.C.	Blue Warriors Xaghra Ultras
Għarb Stadium	Għarb Rangers F.C.	West Blue Army est.2013
Luxol Stadium	Melita F.C.	Melita Supporters Club

=== Morocco ===
Stadium	Club	Stand
Stade Mohamed V	Raja Casablanca	Ultras Green Boys 05, Ultras Eagles 06 / Curva Sud Magana
Stade Mohamed V	Wydad Casablanca	Ultras Winners 2005 /Curva Nord Frimija
Prince Moulay Abdellah Stadium	Association Sportive des FAR	Ultras Askary Rabat 2005, Black Army 1427 / Curva Che
Ibn Batouta Stadium	Ittihad Riadi Tanger	Ultra Hercules 2007/Curva Loca
Fez Stadium	Maghreb Fez	Ultras Fatal Tigers 07 /Curva Nord Savana
Stade El Massira	Olympique Club de Safi	Ultras Shark 06 /Curva Arena
Stade de Marrakech	Kawkab Marrakech	Ultras Crazy Boys 2006 /Curva Sud 36 (Mitica)
Stade Adrar	Hassania Agadir	Ultras Imazighen 2006/Curva Sud; Ultras Red Rebels/ Curva Nord
Stade Saniat Rmel	Moghreb Tetouan	Ultras Los Matadores 2005 – Ultras Siempre Paloma 2006 / Gate 3 – Curva Norte
Stade Mimoun Al Arsi	Chabab Rif Al Hoceima	Ultras Los Rifeños 2012/Curva Rifeña

=== Netherlands ===
Stadium	Club	Stand
De Kuip	Feyenoord	Feyenoord
Galgenwaard	FC Utrecht	Bunnikside
Euroborg	FC Groningen	Z-Side
Philips Stadion	PSV Eindhoven	Oost

=== North Macedonia ===
Stadium	Club	Stand	Group
Philip II Arena	FK Vardar	West Stand	Komiti

=== Norway ===
Stadium	Club	Stand	Groups
Vålerenga Stadion	Vålerenga IF	Østblokka	Klanen, Ikaros Oslo

=== Philippines ===
Stadium	Club	Stand
Panaad Park and Stadium	Ceres–Negros F.C.	South Side Curva

=== Poland ===
Stadium	Club	Stand
Stadion GOSiR	Arka Gdynia	Górka
Stadion Miejski	Lech Poznań	Kocioł
Polish Army Stadium	Legia Warszawa	Żyleta
Henryk Reyman Stadium	Wisła Kraków	Sektor X

=== Portugal ===
Stadium	Club	Stand
Estádio do Dragão	F.C. Porto	Topo Sul
Estádio das Antas	F.C. Porto	Curva Norte
Estádio da Luz	S.L. Benfica	Topo Sul
Estádio José Alvalade	Sporting Clube de Portugal	Curva Sul
Estádio 1º de Maio	Sporting Clube de Braga	Curva Norte

=== Romania ===
Stadium	Club	Stand
Stadionul Steaua	FC Steaua București	Peluza Nord
Stadionul Steaua	FC Steaua București	Peluza Sud
Stadionul Giuleşti	FC Rapid București	Peluza Nord 1996
Stadionul Dan Păltinişanu	FC Timişoara	Curva Sud
Stadionul Stefan cel Mare	FC Dinamo București	Peluza Catalin Haldan / Peluza Sud
Stadionul Ilie Oana	FC Petrolul Ploiesti	Lupii Galbeni / Peluza I
Stadionul Ilie Oana	FC Petrolul Ploiesti	Peluza Latina
Stadionul Ion Oblemenco	CS Universitatea Craiova	Peluza Nord
Stadionul Farul	FC Farul Constanta	Peluza Marina Farul

=== Russia ===
Stadium	Club	Stand
Petrovsky Stadium	FC Zenit Saint Petersburg	Virazh(Virage)

(in Russian)

Stadium	Club	Stand
Lokomotiv Stadium	FC Lokomotiv Moscow	Jug(South)

=== Scotland ===
Stadium	Club	Stand
Celtic Park	Celtic	North Curve
Ibrox Stadium	Rangers	Section BF1
Pittodrie Stadium	Aberdeen	RDS Centre Block

=== Serbia ===
Stadium	Club	Stand
Stadion Crvena Zvezda	Crvena Zvezda	North Stand / Sever
Stadion Partizan	FK Partizan	South Stand / Jug
Stadion Čair	FK Radnički Niš	South Stand / Jug
Stadion Karađorđe	FK Vojvodina	North Stand / Sever
Omladinski Stadion	OFK Beograd	South Stand / Jug
Gradski Stadion Tvrdjava	FK Smederevo	North Stand / Sever

=== Spain ===
Stadium	Club	Stand
Estadio Vicente Calderón	Atlético de Madrid	Fondo Sur
Estadio Santiago Bernabéu	Real Madrid	Fondo Sur
Estadio Manuel Ruiz de Lopera	Real Betis	Gol Sur
Estadio Ramón Sánchez Pizjuán	Sevilla	Gol Norte
Estadi RCDE	RCD Espanyol	Gol Cornellà
Estadio Mestalla	Valencia	Curva Nord Mario Alberto Kempes
La Rosaleda	Málaga CF	Frente Bokeron / Brigadas Sur
Estadio Municipal de Riazor	Deportivo la Coruña	Riazor Blues/Maratón inferior

=== Sweden ===
Stadium	Club	Stand
Strawberry Arena	AIK	Norra Stå
3Arena	Djurgårdens IF	Sofialäktaren (Södra Stå)
Gamla Ullevi	GAIS, Örgryte IS	Sektion 23, Östra Stå
3Arena	Hammarby IF	Norra Övre: Ultra Boys 1999, E1 Ultras 2013, Hammarbykollektivet; Norra Nedre: Hammarby Ultras 1993, Söder Bröder 1998, Bajen Fans 1981, Bara Bajare 1996
Olympia	Helsingborgs IF	Södra Stå; Sektion 37
Borås Arena	IF Elfsborg	Elfsborgsläktaren
Gamla Ullevi	IFK Göteborg	Kommandobryggan
Nya Parken	IFK Norrköping	Curva Nordahl
Stadion	Malmö FF	Norra Ståplats
Behrn Arena	Örebro SK	Västra Stå
Studenternas IP	IK Sirius FK	Arkens Gärde

=== Switzerland ===
Stadium	Club	Stand
Letzigrund	FC Zürich	Südkurve
St. Jakob-Park	FC Basel	Muttenzerkurve

=== Tunisia ===
Stadium	Club	Stand
Stade Olympique de Radès	ES Tunis	Curva Sud Tunis, Ultras Lemkachkhines 02, Supras Sud 04, Blood & Gold 05; Zapatista Esperanza 07, Fedayn Espérantistes 09
Stade Olympique de Radès	Club Africain	Curva Nord TunisDodgers north vandals africain winners leaders
Stade Taïeb Mhiri	CS Sfaxien	Curva Nord Sfax
Stade Olympique de Sousse	ES Sahel	curva nord sousse brigade rouge saheliano fanatics
Stade Olympique de Gabes	Stade Gabésien	Curva Sud Gabes
Stade 15 Octobre	CA Bizertin	Curva Nord Bizerte
Stade Boujemaa Kmiti	Olympique Béja	Ultras Storia 10

=== Turkey ===
Stadium	Club	Stand
BJK İnönü Stadı	Beşiktaş J.K.	Kapalı Tribün
Şükrü Saracoğlu Stadium	Fenerbahçe SK	Türk Telekom Tribünü
Bursa Atatürk Stadium	Bursaspor SK	Teksas (taraftar grubu)
Karşıyaka Arena	Karşıyaka Basket	1912 CURVA (taraftar grubu)

=== Ukraine ===
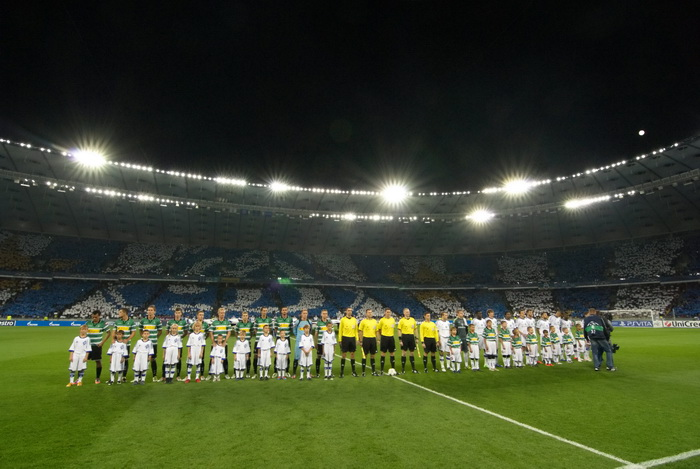
Dynamo Kyiv fans show in a match against Borussia Mönchengladbach.

Stadium	Club	Stand
Olimpiyskiy National Sports Complex	Dynamo Kyiv	Sector'41 & Sector'43
Dnipro-Arena	FC Dnipro	Curva Nord (Sector'9)
Ukraina Stadium	Karpaty Lviv	Sector 15'16
Donbas Arena	Shakhtar Donetsk	Sector 111'112
Metalist Oblast Sports Complex	Metalist Kharkiv	Curva South
Chornomorets Stadium	Chornomorets Odesa	Sector 20
Oleksiy Butovskyi Vorskla Stadium	FC Vorskla Poltava	Sector 22
Avanhard Stadium	FC Volyn Lutsk	Sector 17
Slavutych-Arena	Metalurh Zaporizhzhia	Sʹomyy Sektor
Avanhard Stadium	FC Zorya Luhansk	Sector'7

== See also ==
- Ultras
- Major football rivalries
- Spion Kop
