= List of Croatian football supporters' associations =

This is a list of Croatian football supporters' associations. It includes the supporters of clubs in the Croatian league system and those outside Croatia who regularly support the Croatia national team.

== Croatia national football team ==
- Uvijek vjerni

== Prva HNL ==
- Armada - HNK Rijeka
- Bad Blue Boys - GNK Dinamo Zagreb
- Demoni - NK Istra 1961
- Divlje Svinje - NK Inter Zaprešić
- Kohorta - NK Osijek
- Lokosi - NK Lokomotiva
- Plava brigada - NK Slaven Belupo
- Šljakeri - HNK Gorica
- Torcida - HNK Hajduk Split
- White Stones - NK Varaždin (1931–2015)

== Other leagues ==
- Anđeli - NK Međimurje
- Blue White Killers - HNK Neretva
- Crni Ratnici - NK Hrvatski dragovoljac
- Crveni đavoli - RNK Split
- Demoni - NK Čakovec
- Funcuti - HNK Šibenik
- Galantari - NK Imotski
- Halub boys - NK Halubjan
- Legija - NK Marsonia
- Lunatics - NK Vrapče
- Malari - HNK Trogir
- Olimpijci Županja - NK Graničar
- Pešekani - NK Opatija
- Red Fuckers - HNK Orijent 1919
- Skitnice - NK Nedelišće
- Tornado - NK Zadar
- Ultras Vinkovci - HNK Cibalia
- White Angels - NK Zagreb

== Croatian supporters in Bosnia and Herzegovina ==
- Grdani - NK Brotnjo
- Red Warriors - HNK Orašje
- Poskoci - HŠK Posušje
- Škripari - NK Široki Brijeg
- Ultras Mostar - HŠK Zrinjski Mostar
