= Horde Zla =

Ultras group that supports Bosnia's FK Sarajevo

Horde Zla Udruženje navijača FK Sarajevo (UNFKS)
- Horde Zla – Evil Hordes
- Nickname: Horde; Hordaši
- Abbreviation: HZ87; HZSA
- Founded: 1987
- Type: Supporters' group, Ultras group
- Team: FK Sarajevo
- Motto: "Do zadnjeg dana života mog samo Saraj'vo" ("to the very last day of my life, only Sarajevo!")
- Headquarters: Sarajevo, Bosnia and Herzegovina
- Arenas: Asim Ferhatović Hase Stadium
- Stand: North
- Coordinates: 43°52′26″N 18°24′31″E
- Colours
- Website: hordezla.ba

Horde Zla (English: Evil Hordes) is the organized Ultras group that supports Bosnian football club FK Sarajevo. The group's logo consists of a stylized depiction of the Grim Reaper, borrowed from a Zagor comic book at the time of the group's inception. Horde zla is one of two major football fan groups in Bosnia and Herzegovina. The group's organizational structure is fairly decentralized with many subgroups present at the stadium's north stand – the gathering point of the club's most loyal and passionate fans. Some of the most well known subgroups are Outlaws, Maroon Brothers, Vutrasi, Ultra North, Fina Gradska Raja, Downtown Crew and Central Force.

== History ==
=== Background ===
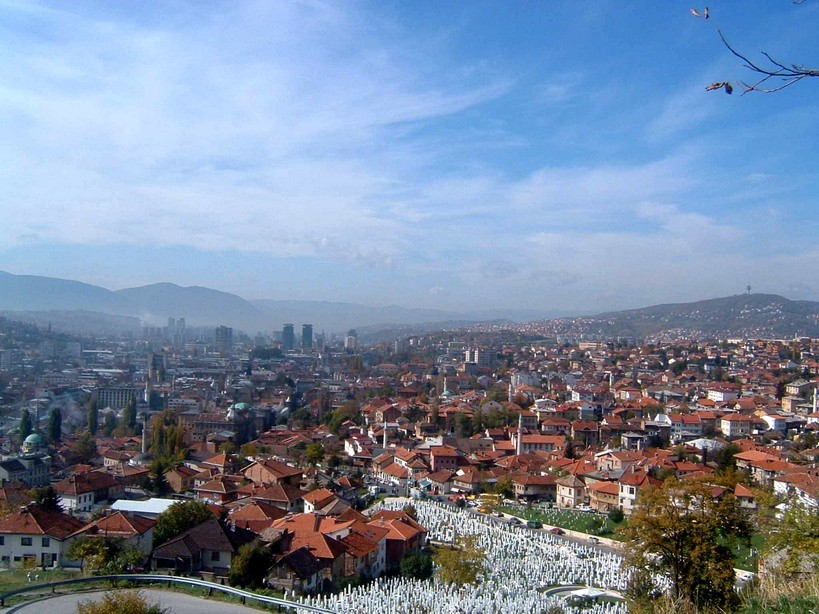
The Stari grad neighbourhoods overlooking downtown Sarajevo

From the moment FK Sarajevo was established on 24 October 1946 it quickly grew a following in the city of Sarajevo. The fact that nearly all pre-war Sarajevan clubs were banned by the new communist authorities left a large vacuum in a city that was traditionally a footballing centre in the Kingdom of Yugoslavia. The majority of fans stemmed from the numerous downtown Sarajevan Baščaršija, Stari grad and Centar neighbourhoods predominantly inhabited by Bosniaks. This is not to say that other ethnicities did not support the club. They did in huge numbers, but the history of organized support for the club is nevertheless closely tied to the aforementioned neighbourhoods. The only major Sarajevan football club not banned by the post-war authorities was FK Željezničar, based in the Grbavica neighbourhood of the city, which would go on to become the maroon-white's biggest rival. FK Sarajevo supporters were historically known as Pitari while an individual was, and is still known as a Pitar. The nickname, meaning a consumer of the local Bosnian dish pita, was originally a derogatory label given by fans of working class Željezničar that implied the upper-class background of most FK Sarajevo supporters. This notion was based on the fact that the old downtown neighbourhoods of the city were the traditional centres of commerce and artisanship, even though the socioeconomic landscape of the city had dramatically changed by the time the club was formed. FK Sarajevo being formed by the post-war communist authorities also meant that the club garnered support from the political and party establishment of the SR Bosnia and Herzegovina which created a specific symbiosis between the progressive state establishment and the traditional, conservative Sarayevan Mahala.

=== Beginnings ===
The curva of the Koševo stadium, October 1990.

The first contours of organized support for the club were drawn out in the late 1950s when the eastern stand of the Koševo stadium drew in the most ardent of supporters. As Sarajevo folklore stipulates, no footballer was ever fully accepted by the eastern stand which was for decades known as a polygon for the city's particular sense of humour and as the main proving ground for every player wearing the maroon and white jersey. The legendary east stand was generally a meeting point for residents of the Sarajevan mahalas that would picnic with their friends, relatives and neighbours while watching matches, only fully supporting players that stemmed from the city's downtown neighbourhoods – a particular form of local patriotism that has, in a way, survived until today. By the mid 1980s, the eastern stand's rowdiness during matches of the time provoked large media coverage. During a league tie against Red Star Belgrade on 17 April 1986 it was reported that a maroon painted snake, reported by some as being a specimen of the venomous horned viper, was thrown off the eastern stand onto the visitors bench. This was never verified by the police or club, while other rumours in circulation stated that the incident against Red Star was caused by someone from the crowd hitting the referee with a large stone. Again, this rumour was never verified either and has in subsequent years become an urban legend, as is the case with the snake rumour. Nevertheless, alarmed by constant incidents and media coverage, the club management headed by then Director Svetozar Vujović opened the north stand of the Koševo stadium to the most fanatical of fans.

The north stand was traditionally not very popular with the footballing public, but was found to be the most adequate because it was the farthest from the field. This move coincided with the Ultras subculture reaching the Former Yugoslavia in the mid 1980s, and finding fertile ground among both members of the Punk and Mod subcultures and non-affiliated football supporters. Soon after, Horde Zla came into being. Namely, several prominent FK Sarajevo supporters of the younger generation, influenced by the Ultras subculture decided to meet, as the story goes, in an alternative nightclub of the time known as AG and create a new identity based on a popular Zagor comic book of the same name. Soon enough, Horde Zla became one of the most popular youth organizations in the city of Sarajevo. By the end of the 1980s Horde zla had become one of the five largest and most organized fan groups in SFR Yugoslavia, alongside Delije, Grobari, Torcida Split and Bad Blue Boys, out-marching to all of FK Sarajevo's matches across the country and travelling to Italy in support of Yugoslavia during the 1990 World Cup. At this time the group also became known for some of the most infamous examples of football violence in the country, including the 1991 stabbing of two FK Partizan supporters in front of the JNA Stadium in Belgrade and the 1989 riots in the city of Mostar before a league fixture against Velež, resulting in the stabbing of a local resident and the destruction of huge amounts of public and private property. While most other Ultra firms in Yugoslavia popularized and marketed the growing nationalist fervor that would lead to the Yugoslav Wars, Horde Zla mostly stayed apolitical. As political tensions escalated on the eve of the Bosnian war, Horde Zla shifted its apolitical course and became one of the first organisations in Bosnia and Herzegovina that openly endorsed and supported the return of the old, historical name for Bosnian Muslims – Bosniaks, as well as calling for Bosnian independence.

=== Bosnian independence ===
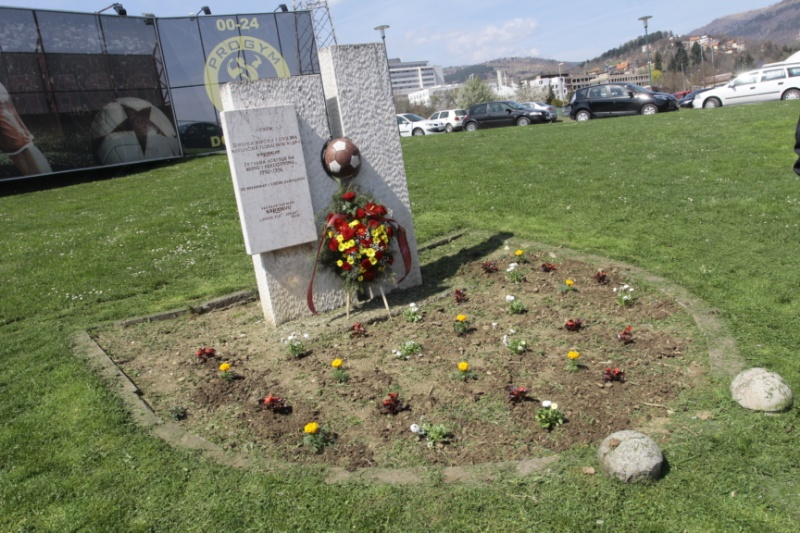
Memorial plaque on the East side of the Asim Ferhatović Hase Stadium

With the start of the Bosnian War many Horde zla members together with their counterparts from other ultras groups stood at the forefront of fronts to defend their city and homeland. A memorial plaque on the north side of the Asim Ferhatović Hase Stadium bears tribute to the hundreds of members of the group killed in the fight for Bosnian independence. As peace was restored to the country and competitive football once again resumed, Horde zla took back their place on the North stand of the country's biggest stadium on the 10th anniversary of the firm's founding. The group again made headlines when, during the 1998 Sarajevo derby against Željezničar, they invaded the pitch after members of the opposing firm, The Maniacs assaulted the FK Sarajevo goalkeeper Mirsad Dedić, resulting in a large on field skirmish that resulted in over thirty serious injuries.

=== The new generation (2007–) ===
Horde zla on the north stand of the Koševo Stadium, 8 October 2023

Horde zla at the Grbavica Stadium, 9 May 2009

By the mid 2000s a new generation of Ultras came up the ranks, unhappy with what they perceived as the group becoming a source of income for the older generation through petty theft, collaboration with an unpopular club management, drug dealing and exploitation of the Horde zla brand. Furthermore, differences existed in the way the two sides saw the future of the group. The younger generation namely wanted a more decentralized organization, while the older called for stronger centralization. By 2006 the new generation, organized through half a dozen subgroups, left the north stand in boycott of the agentry, as they called the leadership of the group, and moved to the west stand of the stadium, where they became known as Horde Zla Zapad (English: Hordes of Evil West). For a year and a half the two fractions supported their team separately, often going into battle across the city. By 2008 physical altercations and violence between the opposing camps turned the city into a battle ground, eventually leading to the younger generation taking control of the north stand. On 9 August 2007 Horde zla clashed with security personnel and police before a Champions League qualifying tie in Genk. In April 2010 Horde zla invaded the pitch after Sarajevo played a 1:1 draw against NK Široki Brijeg, and eventually went on to demolish large portions of the stadium including the VIP box and the benches in clashes with the police and security personnel. The incident resulted in over 40 minor and serious injuries. That same evening members of the group took part in large scale riots during a war veteran's rally that was demanding more social benefits from the government. In July 2012, Horde Zla clashed with Levski Sofia supporters in the first leg of a UEFA Europa League match that was held in Sofia, Bulgaria. They had previously occupied a hotel in downtown Sofia which they ransacked and demolished, not allowing the police to enter by raising barricades. On 20 July 2013 Horde zla clashed with the fans of Albanian club FK Kukësi in Tirana before the start of a Europa League match. On 25 September 2013 Horde zla invaded the pitch during a game versus FK Borac, charging on the visiting fans situated on the South stand of the Asim Hase Ferhatović stadium. The police were forced to intervene and the fixture was subsequently abandoned. On 13 July 2015 Horde zla clashed with Lech Poznań hooligans for hours the night before a Champions League Qualifier in Vogošća, near Sarajevo. On 22 July 2015 Horde zla clashed with Sparta Prague hooligans in Prague, while on their way to Poznań for the reverse leg. On 21 March 2015 Horde zla clashed with police during a league tie fixture at the Vrapčići Stadium in Mostar, leading to numerous injuries. On 22 August 2015 Horde zla clashed with the special police and Čelik fans during a league tie in Zenica, which halted the game for over half an hour. On 9 March 2016 Horde zla clashed with police at the Tušanj Stadium in Tuzla during a Cup tie against Sloboda Tuzla. On 23 July 2016 Horde zla halted the Sarajevo derby on the Grbavica Stadium for nearly an hour, after clashing with police and ripping off seats and setting them alight.

=== Široki Brijeg riots ===
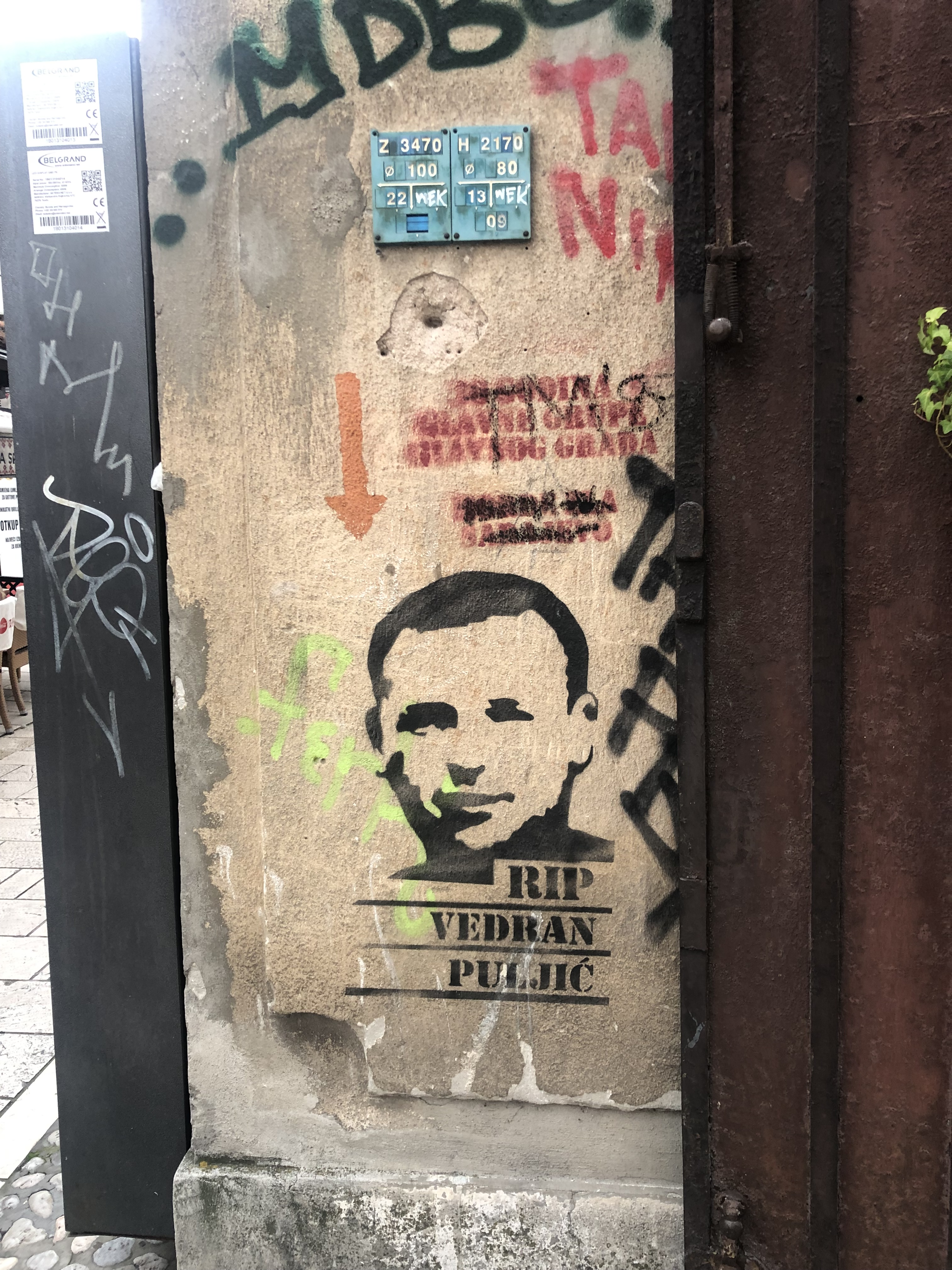
Graffiti in Sarajevo denoting "RIP Vedran Puljić"

On 4 October 2009 Horde zla again made headlines during the infamous Široki Brijeg Football Riots which are considered the worst example of football violence in the history of Bosnia and Herzegovina. The riots resulted in the death of Horde zla member Vedran Puljić from gunshot wounds, with over 40 other participants of the mayhem sustaining serious injuries, including four nonfatal gunshot wounds. The riots started with confrontations between members of Horde zla and the hometown Ultras, Škripari, which subsequently spilled out over the majority of the town. Horde zla burned cars, nearly blew up a gas station and demolished shops while Škripari and residents of Široki Brijeg stoned visiting fan's buses and shot at them with firearms. Horde Zla also claim multiple counts of severe police brutality which led to the death of Horde zla member Vedran Puljić from police inflicted gunshot wounds. There are conflicting reports about who started the violence. Horde zla accused local residents and police of mistreatment on their way to the match, saying that the incident was planned by local politicians and that their buses were separated and parked too far from the stadium which left them open to stoning and attacks. They also claim that initially there were only 30 local policemen present, and they did nothing to prevent the violence. Local police and residents said Horde Zla fans were the first to attack. A local policeman, Oliver Knezović, accused of murdering Puljić, fled to Zagreb, Croatia from where he could not be extradited to the authorities of Bosnia and Herzegovina, as there is no agreement on this issue between the two countries.

== USD Bosna ==
Horde Zla and FK Sarajevo garner a close relationship with USD Bosna, or University Sport Society Bosna (Bosnian: Univerzitetsko sportsko društvo Bosna). The most notable members of said society are KK Bosna Royal, that won the Euroleague Basketball title in 1979 and RK Bosna Sarajevo, that reached the 1/8 finals of the EHF Champions League in 2011.

The relationship traditionally stems from the fact that both sides share unique maroon and white club colours, which lead KK Bosna Royal to garner most of its fan base from FK Sarajevo in its rise to the top in the mid and late 1970s. Through time the two sides became colloquially interchangeable, as Horde zla equally followed both, forming a so-called Maroon Family. Even though RK Bosna did not represent a big player in Yugoslav handball, the club's post-war ascent was thoroughly supported by Horde zla.

After an initiative proposed by Sarajevo fans, on 29 August 2013 FK Sarajevo and RK Bosna Sarajevo signed a cooperation agreement based on the principle of strengthening ties between the aforementioned family members. On 6 November 2013 the same was done between FK Sarajevo and KK Bosna Royal, by which the forty-year-old relationship was officialized.

== Notable supporters ==
Horde zla logo until 2024.

- Ismet Bajramović – Bosnian organized crime figure
- Mirza Bašić – Bosnian professional tennis player
- Asmir Begović – Bosnian professional footballer
- Halid Bešlić – Bosnian folk vocalist and musician
- Emerik Blum – Bosnian Jewish businessman, philanthropist and founder of Energoinvest.
- Jala Brat – Bosnian rapper
- RAF Camora – Austrian rapper
- Jovan Divjak – Bosnian Army general during the Bosnian War
- Edin Forto – Bosnian politician
- Luka Garza – Bosnian professional basketball player for the Boston Celtics
- Alen Halilović – Croatian professional footballer
- Safet Isović – Bosnian singer, one of the most prominent and popular performers of the Bosnian traditional music sevdalinka
- Alija Izetbegović – The first President of Republic of Bosnia and Herzegovina
- Bakir Izetbegović – Bosnian politician
- Sanela Diana Jenkins – Bosnian-American entrepreneur and philanthropist
- Sead Kolašinac – Bosnian professional footballer
- Elmedin Konaković – Politician and Minister of Foreign Affairs of Bosnia and Herzegovina
- Zlatko Lagumdžija – Bosnian politician
- Nenad Marković – Bosnian former professional basketball player and current head coach
- Dino Merlin – Bosnian singer-songwriter, musician and producer
- Marjan Mijajlović – Bosnian-Serbian sports commentator
- Kemal Monteno – Bosnian recording artist and singer-songwriter
- Džanan Musa – Bosnian professional basketball player
- Dino Mustafić – Bosnian theatre director
- Jusuf Nurkić – Bosnian professional basketball player for the Utah Jazz
- Miralem Pjanić – Bosnian professional footballer
- Jusuf Prazina – Bosnian organized crime figure
- Meša Selimović – Yugoslav novelist
- Adam Shapiro – American actor
- Amra Silajdžić – Bosnian fashion model
- Danis Tanović – Bosnian film director
- Mirsad Terzić – Bosnian professional handball player
- Hari Varešanović – Bosnian pop singer and vocalist for Hari Mata Hari
- Safet Zec – Bosnian painter
