= Murder of Michalis Katsouris =

2023 incident in Nea Filadelfia, Greece

Michalis Katsouris
- Born: Michail Katsouris; 1994; Athens, Greece
- Died: 7 August 2023 (aged 29); Nea Filadelfia, Greece

Michalis Katsouris (Greek: Μιχάλης Κατσούρης; 1994 – 7 August 2023) was murdered during hooligan riots between a joint coalition of Bad Blue Boys of Dinamo Zagreb and Gate 13 of Panathinaikos who engaged in conflict with AEK Athens supporters.

Murder of Michalis Katsouris
- Location: Nea Filadelfia, Greece
- Date: 7 August 2023
- Attack type: Stabbing
- Weapons: Knives, clubs
- Deaths: 1
- Victim: Michalis Katsouris
- Perpetrator: Unknown
- Assailants: Bad Blue Boys, Gate 13, Original 21
- No. of participants: Around 300 people

== Background ==
The murder occurred during riots in which a group of Dinamo Zagreb's supporters, Bad Blue Boys, arrived to Nea Filadelphia, Greece, in spite of UEFA's ban and attacked AEK Athens fans with the help of local Gate 13 supporters with whom they share friendly relations. Bad Blue Boys managed to enter Greece despite warnings sent to the Greek authorities by the Croatian, Montenegrin and Albanian police. Once in Athens, some 150 Bad Blue Boys met with Gate 13 supporters and proceeded to AEK Athens stadium where the clash with AEK supporters took place. The Greek police chased down the hooligans suspected for participating in the riots and eventually managed to arrest 105 individuals, most of whom were Croatian nationals. Due to the events which unfolded, the planned third qualifying round match of UEFA Champions League between Dinamo Zagreb and AEK Athens was postponed.

=== Investigation ===
The Greek police eventually established 5 individuals whom they considered the main suspects for the murder. Out of these, there was one Croatian, one Albanian and three Greeks citizens. According to the Greek news site Newsita, knives were found with suspected Croat and Albanian citizen. On 11 August, the first group of detainees was brought before a local judge, and the court hearings continued throughout the weekend. All of the detainees were kept in custody and by Sunday, 13 August were distributed throughout sixteen different prisons in Greece. The treatment of detainees by the Greek state was criticized by the human rights activist Žarko Puhovski who claimed their human rights were brought into question. The case has attracted criticism from Dinamo Zagreb supporters and Croatians alike as Bad Blue Boys are known for not carrying knives. Additionally, Greek journalist Yannis Kemmos published the photos of a colleague which showed Athens city employees power washing the crime scene before the police were called in to do their investigation and forensic analysis. According to the Croatian news site Gol.hr, referring to the information published by Greek site News 24/7, some 24 hours after the hooligan clash, Greek police received a tip about a weapons stash hidden near AEK stadium. The police soon confiscated these objects which included various clubs. On 14 August, a video was published showing CCTV footage of the clash. The footage shows a moment when Katsouris was hit by an unknown hooligan in his right arm, using a club-like object. On the same day, Croatian weekly Nacional referring to the Greek police report, wrote that the clash between two parties was arranged in advance. According to the same report, Bad Blue Boys were led by their two senior leaders who managed to escape, leaving younger group members on their own. Panathinaikos fans, deceptively, theorized that the death of Michalis was from an accidental stabbing by a fellow AEK fan a few days following the event, since Michalis was wearing a blue T-shirt (color of Dinamo Zagreb). On 20 October, an 81 page document showing exactly where Michalis was attacked was published. On 22 December, all arrested suspects were let free. Croatian media reported that one of the bbb hooligans, who is also the son of a Dinamo Zagreb board member, was smuggled out of Athens by joining Dinamo's flight back to Zagreb.

== Reactions ==
Upon learning about what happened to her son, mother of Michalis Katsouris suffered a heart attack. Seven high ranking officials of Greek police were subsequently sacked for failing to act. Greek minister Ioannis Oikonomou stated that "although police quickly apprehended the hooligans, they failed to prevent the attack and proved that they are not capable for challenges such as this". Greek police syndicate representative further criticized the police action and claimed that police services had attackers licence plates and were tipped about their arrival, but some people did not even open the documents delivered to them.

One day after the event, on 8 August, AEK Athens issued a press release in which they claimed that their fan was killed by “professional killers, organised criminals who crossed the country and arrived in New Philadelphia from Zagreb to join forces here with Greek criminal accomplices with the sole purpose of killing”. Dinamo Zagreb also "condemned the incident and expressed their condolences to the family of a fan who lost his life". They also wrote that: “Such events are not in line with the values and ethics we promote as a club and community”. Next day, AEK asked UEFA to kick Dinamo Zagreb out of the competition by saying: "How is it possible that after barbaric murder of Michalis Katsuris done by a band of Criminals from Croatia, we can go on the field and play against this particular team?" They went on by claiming: "those who came here to kill", make integral part of the organization against which AEK Athens needs to play. In response, Dinamo Zagreb issued their own press release in which they described AEK's demand as inappropriate, claiming that "AEK rises the tensions by using inappropriate, aggressive and mongering language with goal of pressuring UEFA." They further wrote that: "[AEK is trying] to use a human tragedy [...] for its own promotion which shows lack of elementary decency, piety and empathy towards the victim." On 11 August, UEFA announced that their president Aleksandar Čeferin will visit Athens in order to consult with Greek prime minister and representatives of AEK, Olympiakos, PAOK and Panathinaikos During his visit to Athens, Čeferin described hooligans as "cancer of the football".

On 9 August, both the mayor of Athens, Kostas Bakoyannis, and his Zagreb counterpart, Tomislav Tomašević, issued a joint statement in which they said that they "strongly condemn this terrible crime which culminated in a loss of young life and a sad episode of hooliganism which compromised lives of innocent citizens and kids." They concluded that: "violence has no nationality" and "its only homeland is hate".

On 14 August, Dinamo Zagreb manager, Igor Bišćan, expressed his condolences to the family of deceased fan.

=== Ramifications ===
One day after the murder, on 8 August, Greek journalist Giorgos Mazias issued a warning to Croatian tourists in Greece. He said that media, social networks and public are about to create the climate of intolerance towards Dinamo, their fans and Croatians in general. He therefore called all Croatians in Greece to camouflage themselves and not reveal their origin. On the same day Nova TV's news team in Athens got attacked by angry locals. Upon realising that the reporters were Croatian, locals surrounded them and demanded them to hand over their camera, eventually taking only their memory card. On 11 August, Croatian actor Rene Bitorajac published on Instagram that Greek news wrongly portrayed him as a football hooligan by showing scenes from Croatian feature film Metastases in their news. Few days later, Bitorajac published vulgar threats he started to receive from angry Greeks as a result.

== See also ==
- List of unsolved murders (2000–present)
