= Đuro Bago =

Croatian football manager

- Born: April 20, 1961 (age 65); Zagreb, Yugoslavia

Đuro Bago (born 20 April 1961 in Zagreb, Yugoslavia) is a football coach and sports director. He is currently the sports' director of NK Inter Zaprešić in the Croatian First League.

== Career ==
He was educated at the Faculty of Physical Culture of the University of Zagreb from 1992 to 1996 and graduated as a football coach. He started his football coaching career in 1992, working with U-12, U-14 and U-16 players in the Zagreb Football Association.

In 1995, he became a member of the Croatian Football Association's team of football experts for players under 16. In the 1997–98 season, he was head coach of the pro-team NK Inter Zapresic (Croatian First League). Thanks to his excellent work with young players in NK Inter Zapresic, in 1999 he received an offer and signed to lead the Croatian football club NK Dinamo Zagreb.

As head coach of Dinamo Zagreb Under 16 team, the team won the Croatian Championship in 2001. In the 2001–2002 season as head coach of Dinamo Zagreb Under 18 team, the team won the Croatian Championships and received the Croatian Cup. As head coach of Football Academy of NK Dinamo Zagreb U-16 and U-18 years, he has coached young players who have gone on to become stars and great players such as:

- Eduardo da Silva (Arsenal)
- Niko Kranjčar (Portsmouth)
- Marko Marić (Lille)
- Vedran Ćorluka
- Luka Modrić

== Coaching success ==
In 2002, he became the assistant coach for the famous Croatian coach Miroslav Blažević when Blažević became head coach of first professional team of Dinamo Zagreb. That year, Đuro Bago's team was the winner of the Croatian Cup.

For the 2002/03 season, his team became Champions of Croatia while he served as assistant coach to Miroslav Blažević, as well as winners of the Croatian SuperCup. For the 2003/04 season, the team was the winner of Croatian Cup and Croatian SuperCup.

n the 2004/05 season, he served as head coach of Dinamo Zagreb for several games after his boss Nikola Jurčević was fired by the management board of Dinamo Zagreb. In the 2005–2006 season he was head coach of Inter Zaprešić, and from 2006 until now he is sports director of NK Inter Zaprešić.

== Eduardo da Silva ==
In 1999, when Đuro Bago was coach of the juniors' team (U-16) in NK Dinamo Zagreb, he discovered then unknown 15-year-old Brazilian striker Eduardo da Silva, who became a star in Croatian football 6 years later. Since 2007, da Silva has been playing for Arsenal, which paid 11.5 million euros for his transfer in summer 2007, the highest transfer fee in history of Croatian football.

In the summer of 2002, during training camp in Crans Montana in Switzerland, head coach Miroslav Blažević of Dinamo wanted to remove da Silva from Dinamo Zagreb and send him back to Brazil, because, according to Blazevic, "Eduardo da Silva is not enough of a talented player for his team Dinamo Zagreb". However, Blažević's assistant coach Đuro Bago persuaded his boss Miroslav Blažević to keep da Silva.

"This young striker Eduardo will go to Geneva tomorrow and return to Rio de Janeiro, because he is not talented enough for our club Dinamo" said Miroslav Blažević, and then he critiqued his assistant Đuro Bago by saying "Đuro, you have told me that this Brazilian boy Eduardo is world class talented striker, but I think that he is not good enough for our club". Then assistant coach Đuro Bago cried and answered to his boss: "Mr Blažević, I think still that he is a great talent, I trust in him. I think that he will become a great forward. Please, can you hold him in Dinamo Zagreb during this training camp and then we will send him on the loan in our 'branch club' NK Inter Zaprešić for young players where he would get his chance for playing".

The head coach of Dinamo, Zagreb Miroslav Blažević, did accept the advice of his assistant Đuro Bago.

Five years later, when Da Silva signed with Arsenal, Miroslav Blažević told the Croatian press: "Really, Eduardo is great player. I have had mistake. Fortunately, my former assistant Đuro Bago has excellent eye for discover young players".

Sports' director of Dinamo Zagreb Velimir Zajec and executive-vice president Zdravko Mamić also wanted to send da Silva back to Brazil, but assistant coach Đuro Bago, supported by a few Croatian sports journalists, persuaded Dinamo's coach and management board to keep da Silva in Dinamo. One year later, da Silva returned from NK Inter to Dinamo Zagreb, and, after playing very well, Zdravko Mamić changed his mind about him.
