= Armada Rijeka =

Football ultras group that supports HNK Rijeka

KN Armada Rijeka
- Abbreviation: ⋊
- Founded: 9 May 1987 (38 years ago)
- Type: Supporters' group, Ultras group
- Club: HNK Rijeka
- Location: Rijeka, Croatia
- Arenas: Stadion Rujevica, Stadion Kantrida
- Stand: West (at home)
- Colours

Armada are a football ultras group that support HNK Rijeka. They also support Rijeka's other sports clubs, such as RK Zamet (handball), VK Primorje EB (waterpolo) and KK Kvarner 2010 (basketball).

The name Armada was given in 1987 at a bar in the "Ri" shopping mall in Rijeka, and the first game attended by the Armada was the Final of the Yugoslav football cup against Hajduk Split in Belgrade on 9 May 1987. The newly formed supporters group named themselves after the Spanish Armada because of the strength they showed in their support. Their fiercest rivals are BBB (Bad Blue Boys), Torcida, Demoni and Kohorta.

At home games, Armada members gather in the west stand at Stadion Kantrida, from where they fiercely support their club. They also regularly support Rijeka in the club's away games. They regularly display choreographies and light up flares.

Their mottos are: Sami protiv svih - Alone against everybody, and Krepat, ma ne molat - Die but not give up.

Armada's mascot is a shark.

There are numerous Armada murals around the city of Rijeka, and its surroundings, showing each neighbourhood's support and love for the club. The murals, a form of urban art, stretch from Jelšane in Slovenia in the north, Novi Vinodolski in the east, Lošinj, on Lošinj island, in the south, and Lovran in the west. The location and photos of murals can be found on Armada's official website.

The supporters of Rijeka are mainly based Istria County and Primorje-Gorski Kotar County.
