= Gate 13 =

Greek football supporters group

Gate 13 Θύρα 13
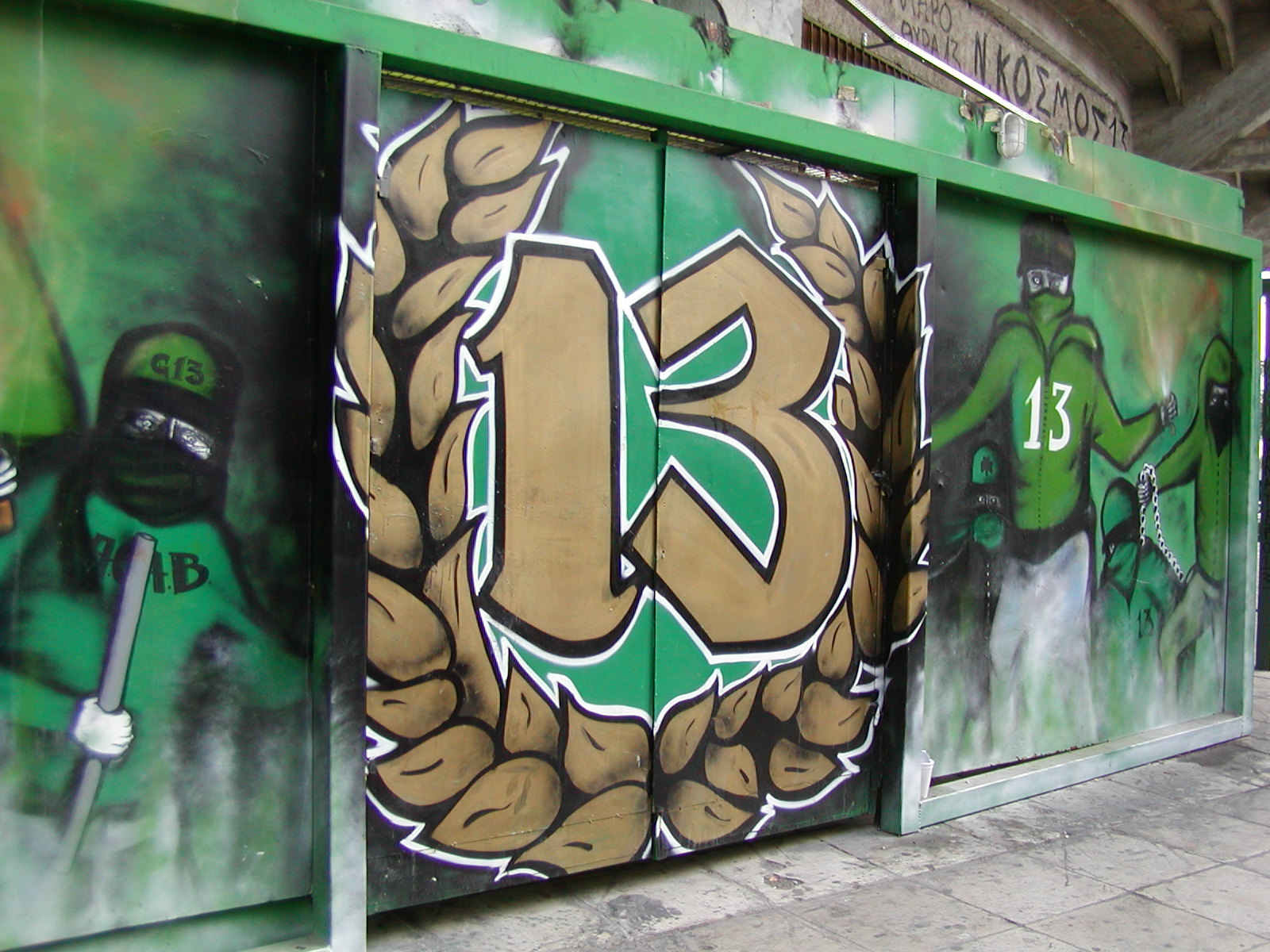
- Gate 13 graffiti at the Leoforos Alexandras Stadium
- Nickname: Gate 13
- Abbreviation: G13
- Established: 19/11/1966
- Type: Supporters' group Ultras group
- Team: Panathinaikos A.O.
- Motto: Panathinaikos means combative soul
- Location: Athens, Greece
- Arena: Leoforos Alexandras Stadium; O.A.C.A. Nikos Galis Olympic Indoor Hall
- Colors: Green, white
- Website: gate13.gr/

Gate 13 (Greek: Θύρα 13), is the name of the ultras group of the Greek multi-sports club Panathinaikos A.O. Officially founded on November 19, 1966, Gate 13 is the oldest supporters' union in Greece. Gate 13 is one of the most powerful ultras group in Europe and has members from all over Greece and Europe, while over the years it has become a part of the club by affecting club decisions and by following the club on all possible occasions.

== History ==
=== Origins ===
Before the foundation of Gate 13 there were various football supporters' clubs all around Greece. The first of these clubs was founded in October 1952 and was called S.F.O.P. (Greek: Σ.Φ.Ο.Π., Σύλλογος Φιλάθλων Οπαδών Παναθηναϊκού, Syllogos Filathlon Opadon Panathinaikou, Panathinaikos Supporters Club) and stayed active for an unknown amount of time.

Towards the end of the 50s, supporters started getting organized as far as the home and away match support. They started attending the matches regularly and always met at the 13th gate of the Leoforos Alexandras Stadium. Gate 13 was also a place for the poorest fans and supporters of the team, with the seats not being numbered, unlike the rest of the stadium and the VIP seats.

In order to organize trips for away matches and other events, the various fan clubs used to write in the two newspapers most read by Panathinaikos fans of the time, Athlitiki Iho (Greek: Αθλητική Ηχώ, Athletic Echo) and Panathinaika Nea (Greek: Παναθηναϊκά Νέα, Panathenaic News).

By 1966, there were a number of supporters' clubs, all named by the area where they were based. Notable clubs included: Ampelokipi, Zografou, Patissia, Gizi, Petralona, Cholargos, Peristeri, Patras and many more, most of which are still active today. Despite the lack of a universal name, the clubs would often meet to discuss various things including the team's performance and management, various trips for away matches and securing tickets for the home matches. Since 1962–63 there had been thoughts of founding a universal club under the name of the stadium's gate where the team's most devoted supporters met, but at the time there were many difficulties. Slowly the name Gate 13 was starting to get recognized and respected from players and fans.

=== 1966 ===
Then, in 1966, after much effort, the "Syndesmos Filon Panathinaikou Athlitikou Omilou "I Thyra 13"" (Σύνδεσμος Φίλων Παναθηναϊκού Αθλητικού Ομίλου "Η Θύρα 13", Fan Club of Panathinaikos Athletic Club "Gate 13") first operated on November 19, 1966, on 68, Kolonos Str in Athens. At the time, it was a club like all the rest, but the difference was that its name would become a major part of Panathinaikos' history. On November 27, 1966, a few days after the foundation of Gate 13, a bus carrying Panathinaikos fans from Athens to Veroia crashed, resulting in the death of two Panathinaikos fans, Giorgos Koskoros (Greek: Γιώργος Κόσκορος) and Dimitris Sarantakos (Greek: Δημήτρης Σαραντάκος) who was one of the founding members of Gate 13.

=== 1967–1971 ===
In 1967 the supporters' clubs of Panathinaikos were increasing in number in Athens and rest of Greece. In 1967, the Greek military junta of 1967–1974 was established and closed many of them.

So did Gate 13, only to reopen in 1968 with new offices on 39, Sokratous Srt in the center of Athens. Many other clubs followed shortly. At that time, the situation inside the stadiums in Greece was very calm with fights only occasionally breaking out.

In the following years Gate 13 expanded and flags with its name and logos started to appear in European stadiums, as well as Greek ones, while the Leoforos stadium was overflowing with people in the vast majority of games.

Plus, the interest for basketball was growing among Panathinaikos's fans. In addition, Gate 13 would attend also non sport related activities like the team's elections. At the same time they would often express their opinion on various issues that they thought negatively influenced the club, like ticket prices etc.

=== 1971–1974 ===
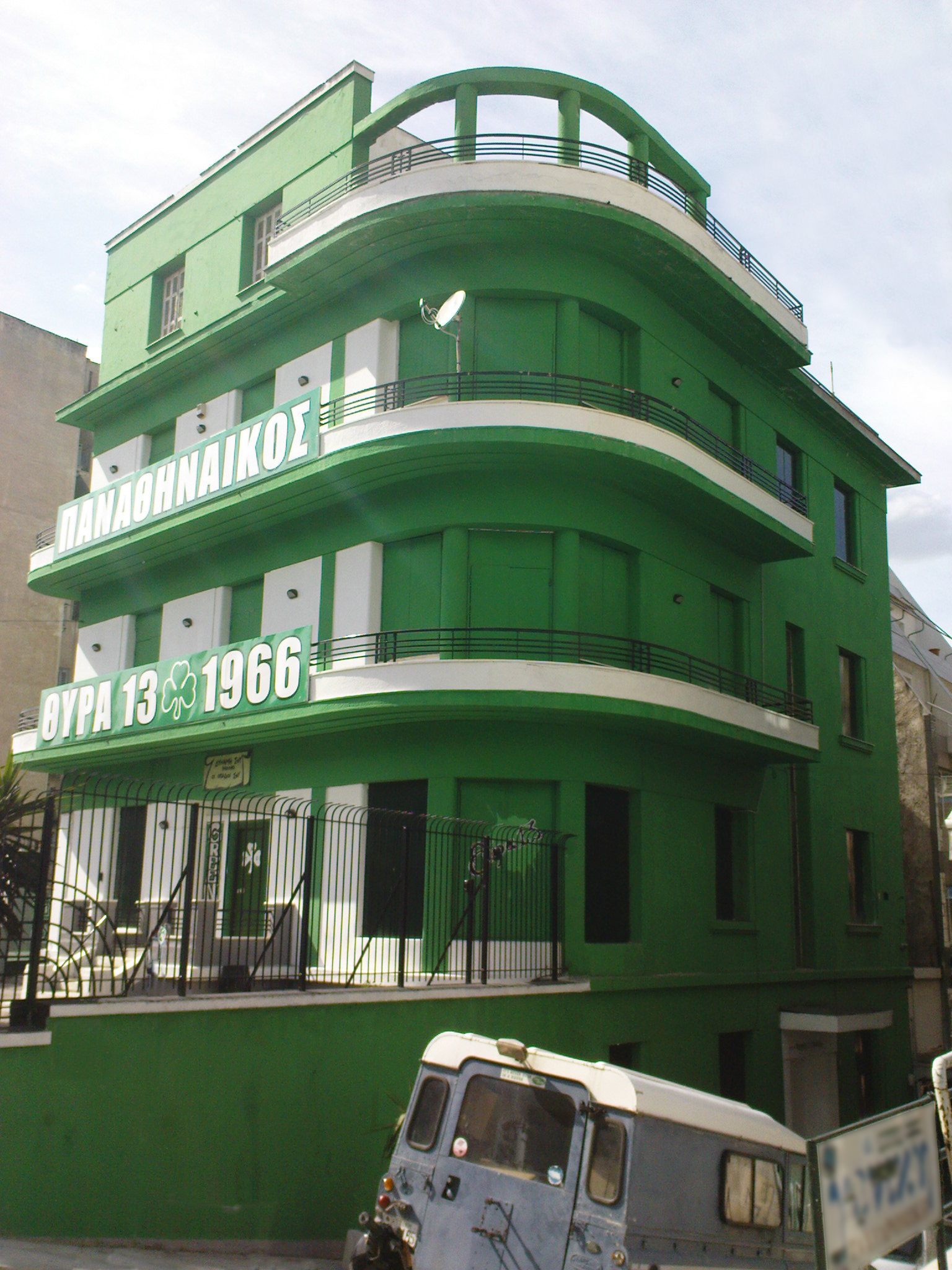
Central fan club of Gate 13, near the Leoforos Stadium.

1971 was a key year in the history of Panathinaikos. The football team reached the 1971 European Cup Final and is the first Greek football team ever to reach the final in a major European competition. Because of this success, Panathinaikos fans increased in numbers all over Greece. Gate 13 was present in all the games of the team in the European Cup with memorable trips. 15,000 fans went to Belgrade to see Panathinaikos against the then very strong Red Star Belgrade while 20,000 traveled to London's Wembley Stadium for the final against AFC Ajax. Because of the success of Panathinaikos's football team in European Competitions, a number of supporters' clubs started reopening while other fans decided to found their own supporters' clubs. Some of the most famous new clubs were in Nikaia and Vyronas in 1972. Immediately after its foundation, the club would attend many away games with its own leaders and would very often criticize Panathinaikos's management and owners. By 1974, most supporters' clubs had their own leaders and would be present in all away matches.

=== 1974–1978 ===
After the fall of the Greek military junta of 1967–1974 supporters' clubs started reappearing all over Greece. By 1978 there were 52 Panathinaikos supporters clubs operating all over Greece, when arch rivals Olympiakos only had a few clubs running. In 1976, during the event for Gate 13's 10 year anniversary, Panathinaikos's fans honoured the fans that had died by keeping a minutes silence in their memory.

Gate 13 remains until today the loudest part of the stadium, with many flags and banners giving colour and character to the stand.

== Friendships ==
=== Ultras Rapid ===
Gate 13 holds a very strong brotherhood with Rapid Wien's fans Ultras Rapid since 2001 when Panathinaikos played Sturm Graz for UEFA Champions League. Since then there have been many actions to promote this friendship such as flags from one to the curva of the other. In June 2016, Ultras Rapid were present at the 50-year celebration of Gate 13 in Athens.

=== Other Friendships ===
Beyond the friendship with Ultras Rapid Wien, the closest active relations parts of Gate 13 share are with GNK Dinamo Zagreb, Bad Blue Boys and Roma, Curva Sud (Fedayn).

Over the years parts of Gate 13, had also friendships with groups from Real Madrid (Orgullo Vikingo) mainly during the 90s, Ajax Amsterdam (F-SIDE Amsterdam), Ferencváros, Hammarby IF FF, Celtic F.C, Sepsi OSK and Maccabi Haifa FC (Ultra boys). Finally the strong friendship with Shamrock Rovers (SRFC Ultras) grew when some of the Gate 13 Ultras made their way to Ireland in 2017 to watch Shamrock Rovers away to Galway.

== See also ==
- Michalis Filopoulos
- Panathinaikos Movement
