= Ribnjak, Zagreb =

Neighbourhood of Zagreb, Croatia

Ribnjak
- Historic neighborhood and park
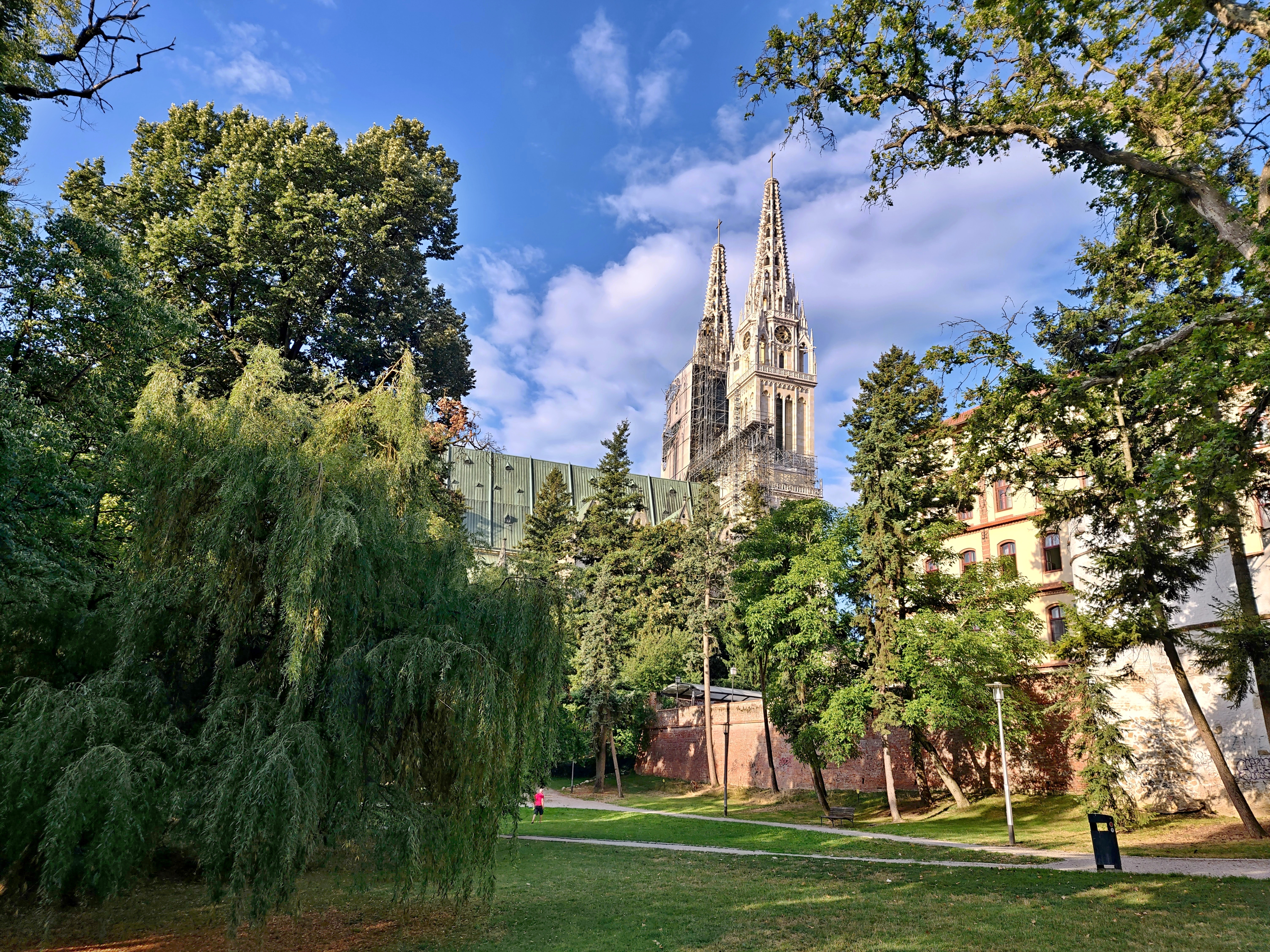
- Ribnjak Park in central Zagreb
- Interactive map of Ribnjak
- Coordinates: 45.8167°N 15.9833°E
- Country: Croatia
- City: Zagreb
- City district: Gornji Grad–Medveščak
- First mentioned: Middle Ages
- Time zone: UTC+1 (CET)
  - Summer (DST): UTC+2 (CEST)
- Website: www.zagreb.hr

Ribnjak (pronounced [rîbɲak]) is a neighborhood in the Gornji Grad - Medveščak district of Zagreb, Croatia, directly east of the Zagreb Cathedral. According to the 2001 census, the neighborhood had 2,956 inhabitants; as of 2011, the population was 1,324. It is named after its main north–south thoroughfare, the Ribnjak Street and the historic Ribnjak Park, located just east of the walls of Kaptol.

ZET tram tracks in the Ribnjak Street pass through the neighborhood, carrying lines 8 and 14. A tram station is located on the Grškovićeva and Ribnjak intersection in the northern part of the neighborhood. The southern part is served by the Draškovićeva Street tram transfer station. The neighborhood is also served by bus routes 106, 201, 226 and 238. All routes pass through Zvonarnička and Degenova Street, delineating the north border of the neighborhood.

== Ribnjak Park ==
Ribnjak Park
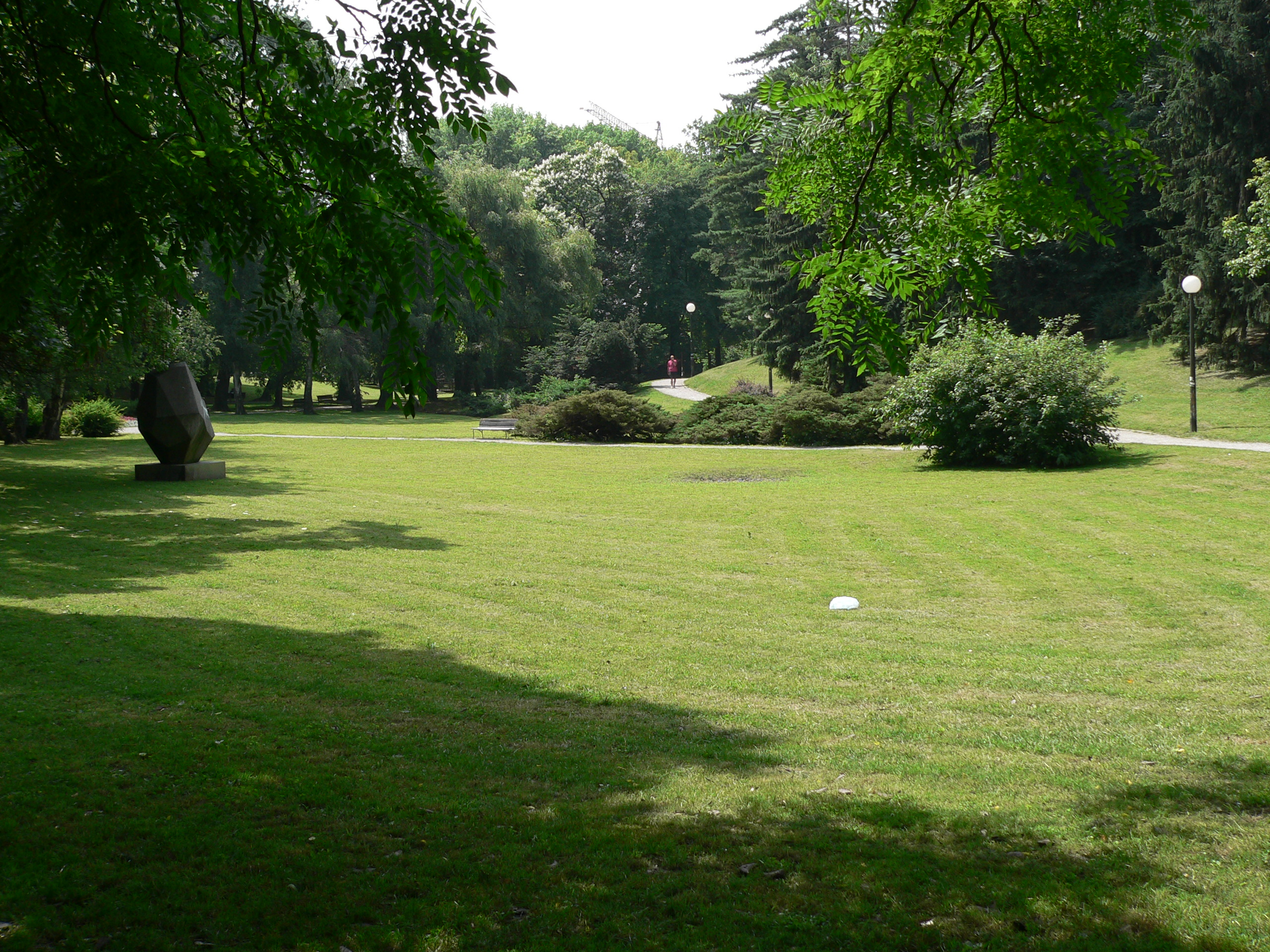
- Interactive map of Ribnjak Park
- Type: Urban park
- Location: Zagreb, Croatia
- Coordinates: 45.817°N 15.980°E
- Area: 4.67 hectares (11.5 acres)
- Created: 1830
- Operator: Javna ustanova – Maksimir
- Status: Open all year

The Ribnjak Park is situated on the west side of Ribnjak Street at 45.817°N 15.980°E. Located five minutes of walk away from Ban Jelačić Square, the park comprises the western part of the neighborhood. It is also the location of Youth Center Ribnjak and the Purgeraj club.

The park had been a part of the city fortification since the 15th century, but it was projected in its current form and built in 1830 by Zagreb bishop Aleksandar Alagović and architect Leopold Klingspogle. The park was named after the fishponds in the area. However, since late 19th century, parts of the park have been slowly chipped away to make way for new buildings and infrastructure, such as the widening of Ribnjak Street. From 14th century on, the size of ponds had continuously been artificially decreased, until the last pond (in the southern end) was filled and paved over to make way for Josip Lang Square in 1870. Until 1946 the park had been private property of the Zagreb archdiocese. After the World War II it was expanded and opened for public, becoming a prime location in the heart of Zagreb.

Although a beautiful tourist attraction during the day, after dusk the park has been known to turn into a youth site for binge drinking, as well as gang violence. After a murder of member of a violent football fan faction committed in March 2008, and an announced bloody retaliation by the murdered fan's gang, the City of Zagreb announced it will hire wardens to patrol the park 24 hours a day.

The Ribnjak Park was also the site of the yearly festival Park-in-Zagreb. In 2008, the festival lasted two weeks and hosted many well-known Croatian bands such as The Beat Fleet and Psihomodo Pop. Since 2017, Ribnjak Park hosts the Crossover Festival, a boutique international music festival.
