= Uvijek vjerni =

- Founded: 2008
- Type: Supporters' group
- Teams: Croatia national football team
- Headquarters: Croatia

Uvijek vjerni is a supporters group in Croatia who follow the Croatia national football team.
