= Miroslav Bičanić =

Croatian footballer (born 1969)

Personal information
- Date of birth: 29 October 1969 (age 57)
- Place of birth: Đakovo, SR Croatia, SFR Yugoslavia (today's Croatia)
- Height: 1.77 m (5 ft 10 in)
- Position: Midfielder

Youth career
- Osijek

Senior career*
Years	Team	Apps	(Gls)
1989–1992	Osijek	47	(4)
1993–1994	NK Zagreb	25	(0)
1994–1996	Osijek	53	(13)
1996–1997	MSV Duisburg	14	(1)
1997–1998	Hapoel Haifa	27	(6)
1998–1999	Hansa Rostock	4	(0)
1999	Hapoel Be'er Sheva	12	(2)
2000	Bnei Yehuda	6	(1)
2000	Chongqing Lifan	25	(12)
2001	Sichuan Quanxing	16	(1)
2002	Qingdao Jonoon	24	(1)

International career
1993–1996	Croatia	2	(1)
- * Club domestic league appearances and goals

Miroslav Bičanić (born 29 October 1969) is a Croatian former professional footballer who played as a midfielder. He spent his club career in Croatia, Germany, Israel and China and made two appearances for the Croatia national team scoring one goal.

== Club career ==
Bičanić was born in Đakovo. He moved to Bundesliga team MSV Duisburg in 1996, but played only 14 matches (one goal) in the championship and in the German Cup (one goal against Energie Cottbus). In the 1997–98 season, Bičanić played for Hapoel Haifa and reached the third place in the championship. His goal against Maccabi Tel Aviv was "Goal of the Year". After that he returned to Germany, signing with Hansa Rostock. As he played only several matches in the league and one in the cup (where he scored his only goal against Werder Bremen), Bičanić was unhappy with his status and came back to Israel.

He played two months for Hapoel Be'er Sheva and three for Bnei Yehuda before he joined Chongqing Lifan in February 2000. Bičanić won the Chinese FA Cup twice: 2000 with Chongqing Lifan and 2002 with Qingdao Jonoon.

== International career ==
Bičanić made two appearances for the Croatia national team in friendlies against Ukraine (in 1993, one goal) and Hungary (in 1996).

== Post-playing career ==
Today, Bičanić is a FIFA licensed players agent.

== Career statistics ==
=== International goals ===
Scores and results list Croatia's goal tally first, score column indicates score after each Bičanić goal.

List of international goals scored by Miroslav Bičanić
No.	Date	Venue	Opponent	Score	Result	Competition
1	26 June 1993	Stadion Maksimir, Zagreb, Croatia	Ukraine	3–1	3–1	Friendly
