= Mihalis Filopoulos =

Greek murder victim

Coordinates: 37°57′13″N 23°51′38″E

Mihalis Filopoulos (Greek: Μιχάλης Φιλόπουλος; 1985–2007) was a 22-year-old Panathinaikos fan who was stabbed to death on March 29, 2007, at Paiania, a town near Athens, Greece, during a pre-arranged clash with rival hooligans of Olympiakos. His death caused major upset in Greece and sparked a large police investigation into the organised supporters' scene.

== Previous days ==
A volleyball game between Panathinaikos' and Olympiakos' women teams was scheduled to take place on March 29, 2007 in Paiania, for the Greek volleyball cup. Since this was a women's event, not much police force was assigned to it (usually men's games between the two teams are classed as very high risk). Therefore, hooligans from both sides sought the opportunity to organise a full-scale clash unobstructed by police. Indeed, news about the meeting in Paiania (later called "rendezvous (ραντεβού) of death" by the media) were circulating in supporters clubs and web sites and at least 400 people knew about it beforehand.

== March 29. 2007 ==
Olympiakos hooligans were initially gathered at Peristeri and Panathinaikos hooligans at Halandri. From there, each formed motorcycle convoys to Paiania. The tensions were so high that a player of the local team Marko was stabbed by Olympiacos fans because he was seen in a car wearing his team colours, green, just because they were also Panathinaikos colours. Filopoulos was allegedly targeted for a previous incident involving hooligans from the two teams. During the riot he was stabbed by two different people and another four hit him with clubs on the head. The scene was filmed with a mobile phone camera, distributed to fans circles and even published on YouTube. Several media took hold of the video and kept showing it for days, even in prime-time.

== Investigation ==
A police raid took place immediately afterwards in many of the clubs of both teams and large quantities of weapons and drugs were seized, including petrol bombs, knives, baseball bats, slingshots, metal chains and flare guns. Police managed to gather evidence for the participation of 28 people from both teams in the rendez-vous.

Ιn May, nine people were charged with accessory to homicide: Michalis Kountouris (a member of Olympiakos' board of directors, member of Gate7, later became president of Olympiacos CFP), Michalis Bekakos (security in Karaiskakis Stadium), Ioannis Andronikos (nicknamed "Charos"/"Death"), Tasos Poulos (nicknamed "Godzilla"), Vasilis Roubetis, Christos Sakatis, Vasilis Psykakos, Apostolos Korakis, Nikolas Vagiopoulos. 18 other people were charged for other reasons.

== Aftermath ==
In the wake of Filopoulos' death, all team sport events in Greece were suspended from March 29 to April 12. Although people were always generally negative towards supporters' clubs, this was considered as the last straw. It was the first time something of this scale (over 500 people) and with such grave consequences had ever happened and calls for immediate investigation on clubs "private armies" were heard. Subsequently, the ministry of Sports, did indeed close all clubs and only allowed the reopening of some after rigorous id and background checks of its members. They also vowed to install surveillance cameras to all stadiums and enforce even harsher penalties.

== Later developments ==
On 6 December 2007, it became known that legal discrepancies in the way suspects were examined by the police, rendered their statements invalid, even though some had confessed. This resulted in the case of manslaughter being put in the archives and legal proceedings to be filed only for minor charges. Two days later, after an amateur football match at Lykovrysi between the home team and Pangrati, 20 persons wearing hoods, attacked with crowbars and clubs 3 players of the away team, among them Nikos Stylianesis, who was one of those charged but later released for Filopoulos murder. On 7 June 2023, one of the attackers, Vasilis Roubetis, known by his nickname "Rambo", was shot to death by 2 unknown men close to his home in Korydallos along with another person. It was established that his murder was due to his involvement in organized crime and not in any way connected to football hooliganism.

== See also ==
- Ultras
