= Bakir Beširević =

Bosnia and Herzegovina footballer

Personal information
- Date of birth: 3 November 1965 (age 60)
- Place of birth: Orašje, SFR Yugoslavia
- Position: Midfielder

Senior career*
Years	Team	Apps	(Gls)
1989–1991	Velež Mostar	67	(8)
1992–1994	Osijek	44	(10)
1994	Pazinka	14	(4)
1994–2002	Osijek	223	(37)
2002–2005	Orašje	17	(1)

International career
1996–2000	Bosnia and Herzegovina	19	(0)
- * Club domestic league appearances and goals

Bakir Beširević (born 3 November 1965) is a retired Bosnian professional football midfielder who played for Velež Mostar and Orašje in Bosnia and Herzegovina and Osijek in the Croatian Prva HNL.

== Club career ==
Beširević is Osijek's second most capped player behind Mile Škorić.

== International career ==
He made his debut for Bosnia and Herzegovina in an October 1996 FIFA World Cup qualification match against Croatia in Bologna and has earned a total of 19 caps, scoring no goals. His final international was a January 2000 friendly match against Qatar.
