= Kohorta Osijek =

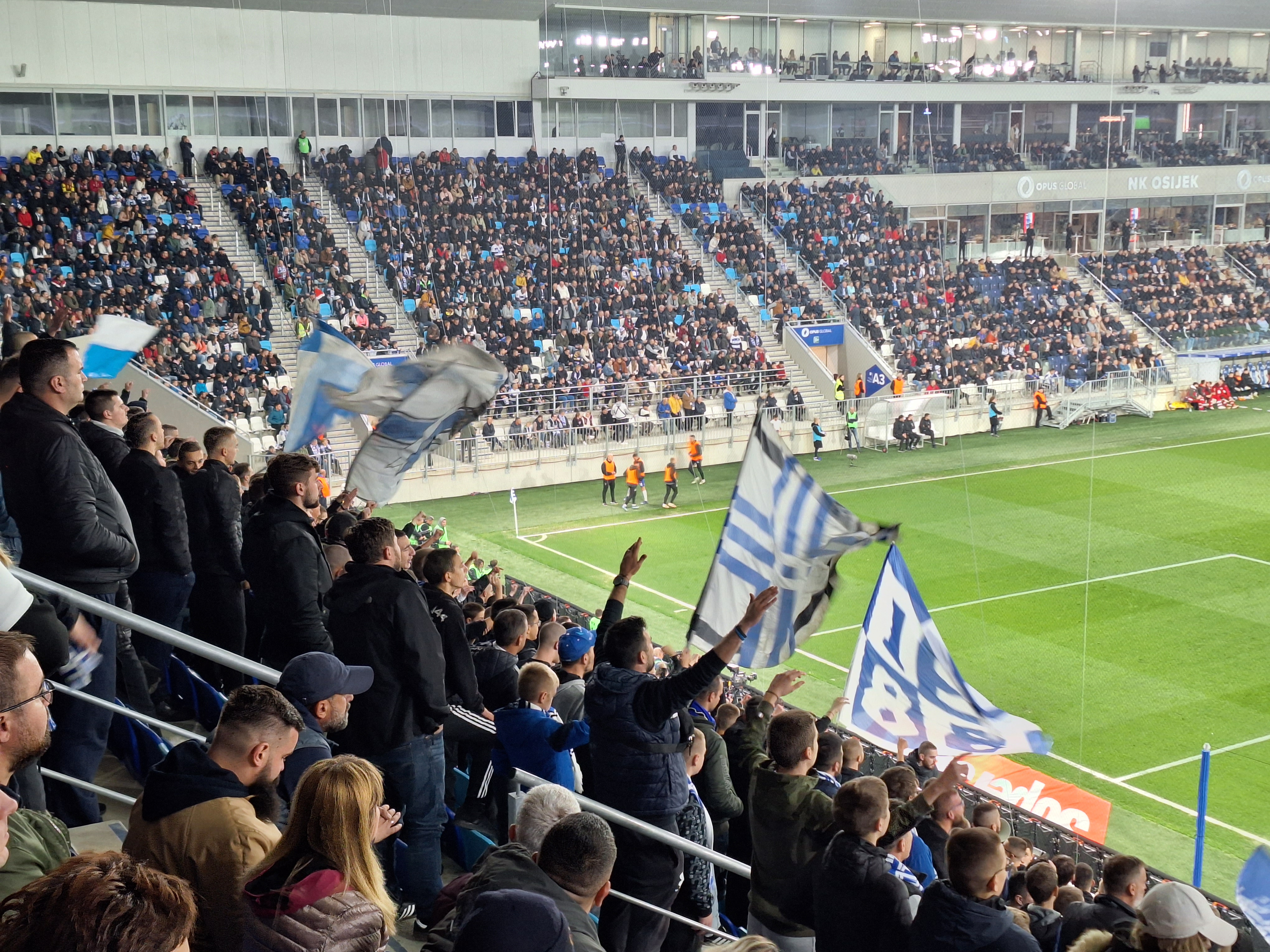
- Kohorta Osijek in Opus Arena
- Founded: 1988
- Type: Ultras group, football supporters group
- Club: NK Osijek
- Location: Osijek, Croatia
- Arena: Opus Arena
- Colours
- Website: www.kohorta.net

Civil association „Kohorta“ Osijek is registered with the Croatian non-governmental organization register under the number 14001240. It is headquartered in Osijek - the administrative center of Osijek-Baranja county, Croatia.

Kohorta Osijek is a group of supporters of Croatian soccer club NK Osijek. It used to be located on the southeast and east stands of the Gradski vrt stadium in Osijek. On the new stadium it is located on the south side of the Opus Arena.

== Activities ==
Like any other formally organized group of Football supporters, its main task is to be present on every game of the NK Osijek, no matter where the game is played, to cheer for the NK Osijek during the game, to publish press releases stating their supports or condemns about the actions of the NK Osijek players or that of the Steering Committee of the NK Osijek. They are proactive in monitoring every facet of soccer and everything connected to it. Their voice was heard when the Osijek Town Hall made an announcement of proposing to name Davor Šuker as an honor citizen of Osijek. Kohorta was strongly against such a proposal. Every year Kohorta celebrates anniversary of its existence, but the 20th anniversary of the association, that took place in 2008, was very special. The Kohorta association made a film in their own production, about the association, its members – old and young and about cheering for their team. The film was screened in the Urania cinema. The film is titled: “20 years of pride”. The celebration lasted for a few days, with the grand finale on a soccer match NK Osijek – NK Rijeka. Later on the film was published on the YouTube, and can be found there under the entry: “Kohorta Osijek 20 godina ponosa (cijeli film)“. The language of the film is Croatian. For their 22nd anniversary, the members of the Kohorta made and recorded a song titled: “I give life of mine for Osijek”. The original title is:”Dajem život svoj za Osijek”. The song found its place on the Kohorta's new CD of cheering songs. Kohorta was the first soccer supporter group that paid a visit to the pitch in Serbia, after the Croatian War of Independence. They visited town Subotica, to watch and cheer for their team.
