= Bad Blue Boys =

GNK Dinamo Zagreb football supporters group

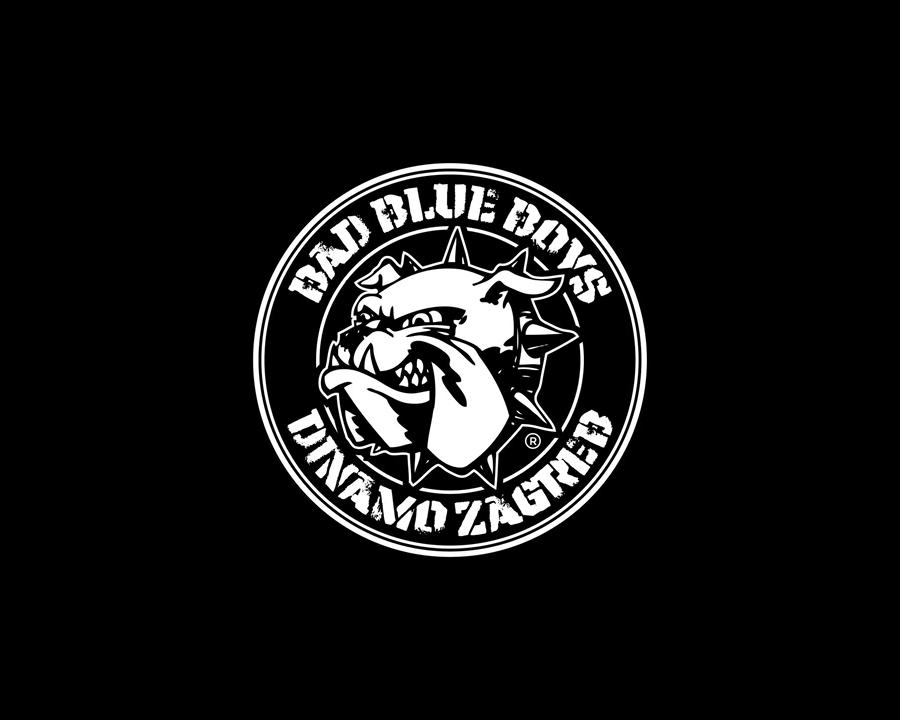
- Bad Blue Boys
- Abbreviation: BBB
- Founded: 17 March 1986 (40 years ago)
- Type: Supporters' group, ultras group
- Club: Dinamo Zagreb
- Location: Zagreb, Croatia
- Arenas: Stadion Maksimir
- Stand: North (at home)
- Colours
- Website: www.badblueboys.hr (in Croatian)

Bad Blue Boys (BBB) are an ultras group who support the Croatian football club GNK Dinamo Zagreb.

== History ==
Bad Blue Boys were officially founded on 17 March 1986 in Zagreb, with almost 16 members from different areas of the city. The name of the group is said to have been inspired by the 1983 film starring Sean Penn, Bad Boys. Their mascot is a bulldog and their official anthem is "Dinamo ja volim" ("I love Dinamo"), by the Croatian rock band Pips, Chips & Videoclips. At home matches in Dinamo Zagreb's Maksimir Stadium, the Bad Blue Boys are located behind one goal in the North Stand. The groups has a Bulldog on its badge and as its mascot.

In 2008 the group were involved in a controversy over graffiti daubed on the walls of the Zagrebački električni tramvaj building at Remiza, saying, "Death to Journalists, BBB ZG", which appeared on 21 March 2008. The graffiti appeared following the death of a BBB member after a brawl in Ribnjak park. BBB denied any involvement in either the graffiti or other incidents which had occurred, criticising reporters for "agitation and prejudgement" for stating that Dinamo fans were behind the entire matter. Zagreb's mayor Milan Bandić also offered his support to the Bad Blue Boys, claiming they were wrongly accused and that the entire story was false.

In November 2008, BBB fans were praised by the English media for their support at White Hart Lane in London at a UEFA Cup match against Tottenham Hotspur for continuing to loudly support their team, even when they were losing 4-0. From 11 August 2010 the Bad Blue Boys were boycotting the club's matches due to their dissent with the club's leadership. The boycott ended on 30 August 2011, but remained active for the European matches in the Champions League that season. In 2011, Bad Blue Boys were mentioned in the list of 16 "hardcore hooligan firms, ultras groups we wouldn't want to mess with", compiled by the American sports website Bleacher Report.

After the devastation of the Zagreb earthquake in March 2020, BBB immediately mobilized and helped local authorities in Zagreb and surrounding areas. Help ranged from organizing fundraisers, relocating equipment from a damaged hospital and helping to rebuild homes in conjunction with other ultra groups across Croatia.

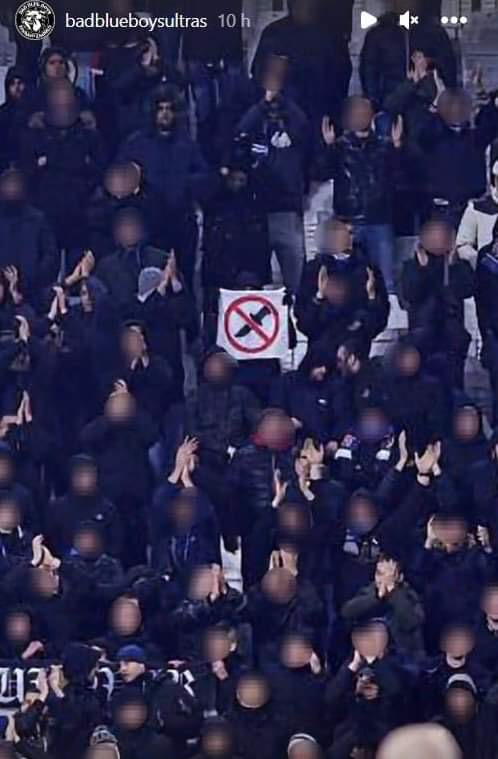
Bad Blue Boys supporters displaying a 'no knives' banner during a match.

On 8 August 2023, in the build up to the 2023–24 UEFA Champions League third qualifying round, 120 members of the BBB, including members of Gate 13, arrived outside the Agia Sophia Stadium of AEK Athens F.C., despite a UEFA ban on away supporters. In the ensuing conflict, a 29-year-old was killed, eight others were injured and 104 (among them 94 Croats, six Greeks, one Albanian, one German, and one Austrian) were arrested. UEFA decided to postpone the match to 19 August 2023. To date, the nationality of the perpetrator has not been identified. The case has attracted criticism from Dinamo Zagreb supporters and Croatians alike as Bad Blue Boys are known for not carrying knives. Additionally, Greek journalist Yannis Kemmos published the photos of a colleague which showed Athens city employees power washing the crime scene before the police were called in to do their investigation and forensic analysis.

They share close relations with HNK Šibenik (Šibenski Funcuti), NK Široki Brijeg (Škripari), FC Dynamo Kyiv, FC Dinamo Tbilisi, A.S. Roma (Fedayn) and Panathinaikos F.C. (Gate 13).

== Politics ==
The club has been described as "committed to a Croatian nationalist platform". Zagreb journalist Andrej Krickovič argued that Bad Blue Boys were at the forefront of the nationalist movement in the country in 1990 and that they had offered their support to Franjo Tuđman (who became the first president of Croatia in the 1990s) in Croatia's first independent elections. And Saša Podgorelec, a Zagreb film director who made a documentary about the Bad Blue Boys, stated that they were, "conscious enough of their own identity and brave enough to express their wishes for Croatian independence ... when others were too frightened to say so." Later on, BBB turned against Martin Bedić who pushed for club's name to be changed to NK "Croatia". Tuđman was a frequent visitor of home games and would usually be greeted by stadium officials before the match started. This would always trigger loud whistling and chanting from Bad Blue Boys often forcing Live TV coverage to mute the audio.

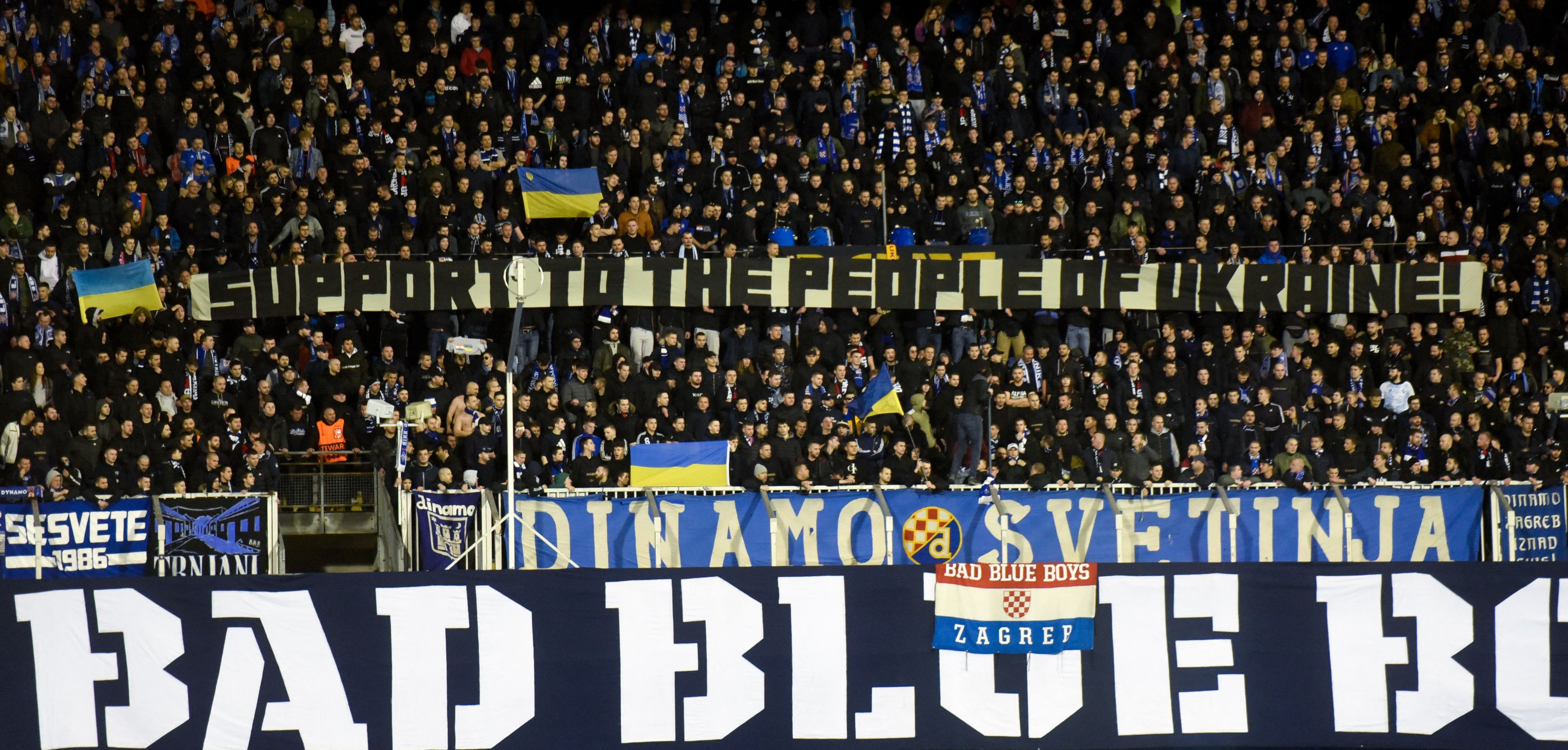
Bad Blue Boys displaying a banner supporting Ukraine and its people in the aftermath of Russia's invasion in February 2022.

On 24 February 2022, BBB received recognition and praise across the globe for being one of the first sets of supporters to publicly show their support for Ukraine in the context of the Russian invasion that had begun that day. BBB members displayed several Ukrainian flags along with a banner that read "Support to the people of Ukraine". The image was subsequently shared on the Instagram stories of the football section of Bleacher Report, Manchester City left-back Oleksandr Zinchenko, and was the main photo in an article from Time magazine. They also chanted the Ukrainian national slogan "Slava Ukraini".

=== Association with fascism ===
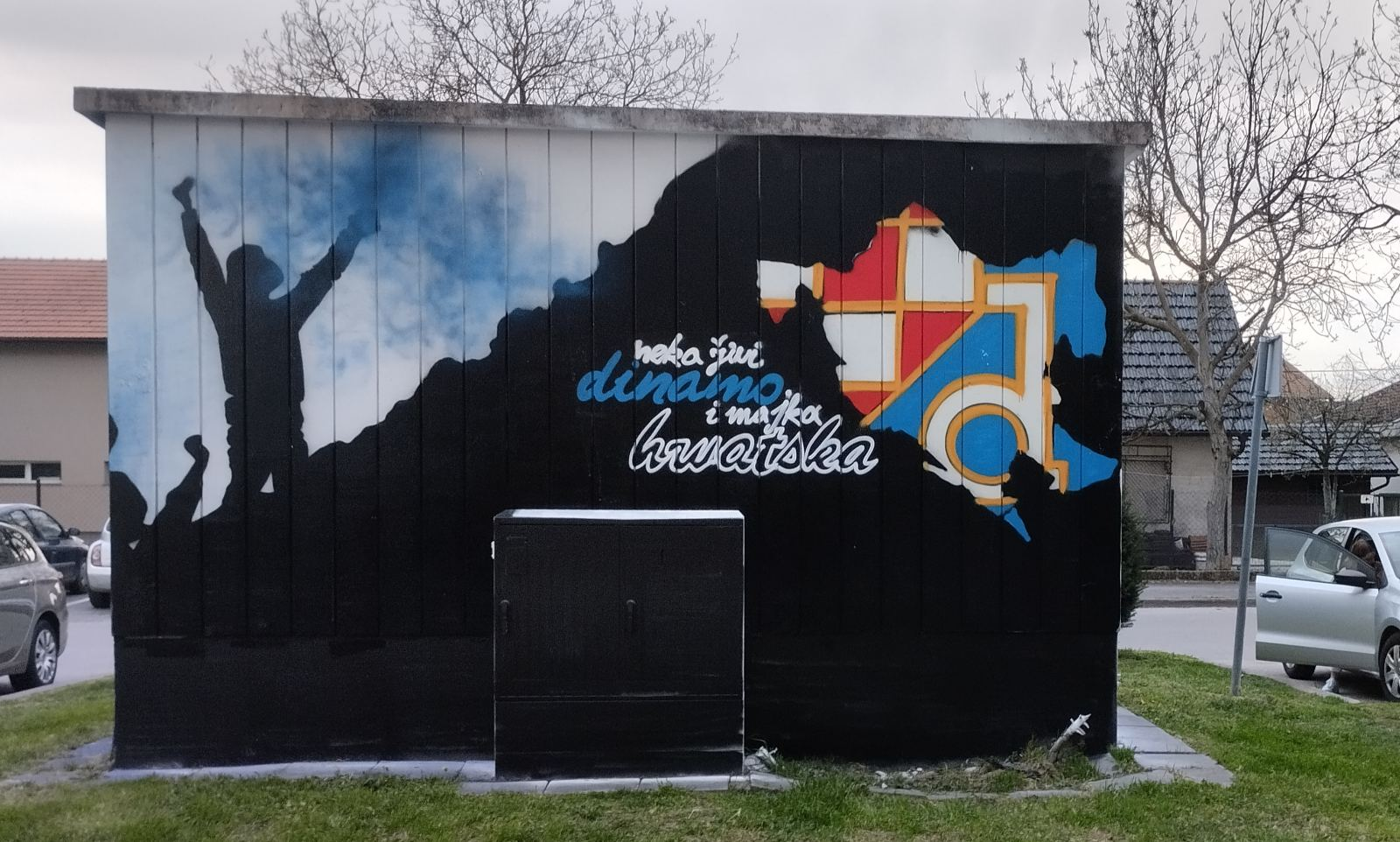
Bad Blue Boys graffiti promoting irredentist concept of Greater Croatia.

In 2006, Croatian police intervened in on a barbecue party organized by Bad Blue Boys after receiving report of displayed swastika. The two police officers who came to remove swastika were subsequently attacked by Bad Blue Boys using clubs.

In 2018, Croatian police raided BBB quarters in Zagreb, where they seized weapons; clubs, pyrotechnics, balaclavas and ammunition. Their quarters were also decorated with graffiti dedicated to Adolf Hitler and Ante Pavelić.

In October 2023, Bad Blue Boys chanted an Ustaša march song during a match between Dinamo Zagreb and HNK Gorica. The Croatian Football Federation ordered Dinamo Zagreb to pay a fine of 17,000 euros. Eight Bad Blue Boys were arrested by Croatian police for the incident, three of whom were banned by the court from attending Croatian Football League and Croatian national team matches for one year. The remaining five were given one-year parole or 60 days in prison.
