= Torcida Split =

Croatian football supporters' group

Torcida
- Abbreviation: Th1950
- Founded: 28 October 1950 (75 years ago)
- Type: Supporters' group, Ultras group
- Club: HNK Hajduk Split
- Motto: Hajduk živi vječno (Hajduk lives forever)
- Location: Split, Croatia
- Arenas: Stadion Poljud
- Stand: North (at home)
- Colours
- Website: Torcida.hr

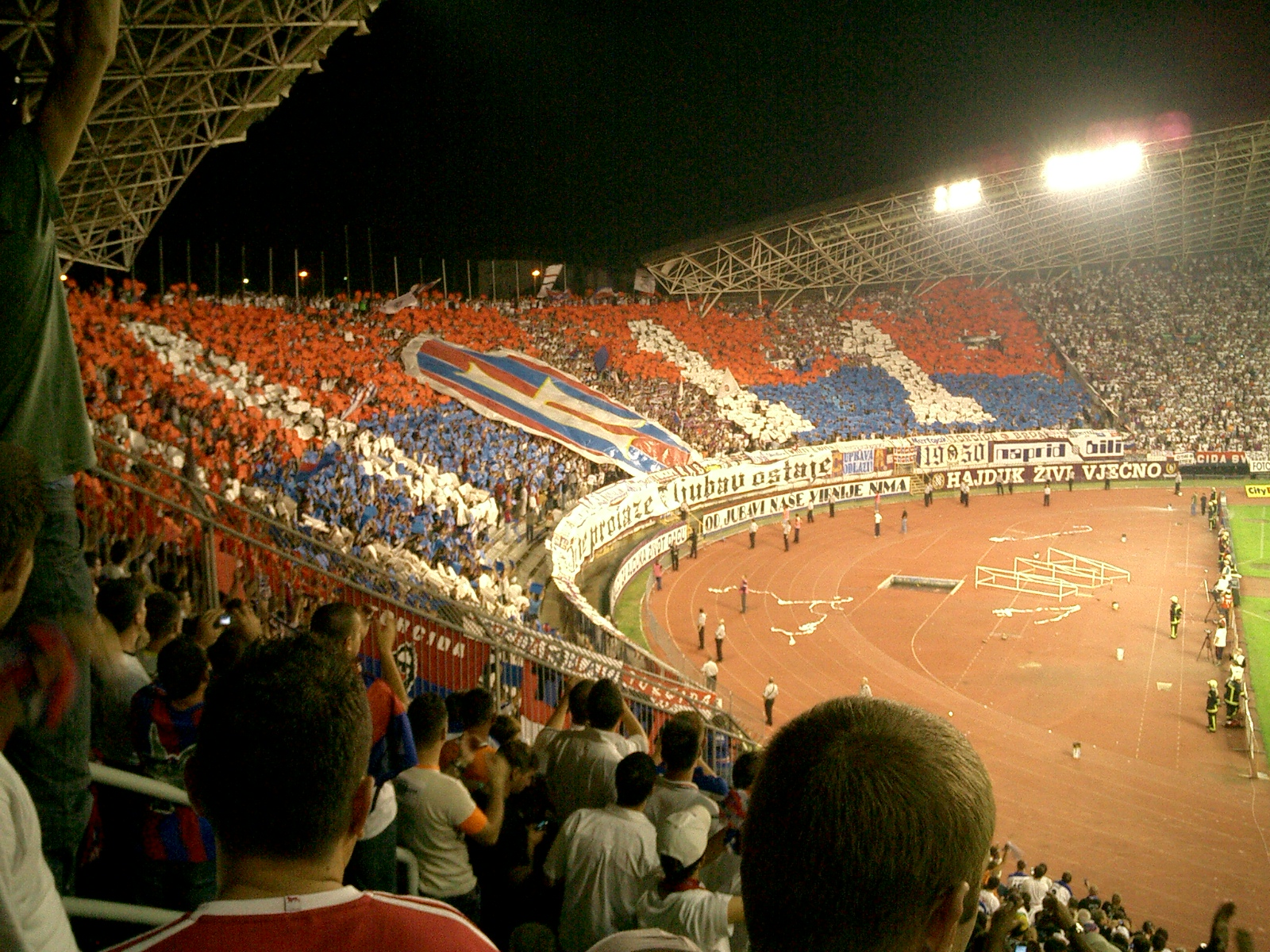
Torcida fans decorating the stands of Poljud stadium during the Eternal Derby

Torcida is a HNK Hajduk Split supporters' group in Croatia with branches in other countries, mostly (but not exclusively) among Croat communities. Founded on 28 October 1950, Torcida is the oldest supporters group in Europe.

The group as a whole traditionally maintains good relations with the French Magic Fans of AS Saint-Étienne, the Czech Slavia Prague football club supporters, especially fan group Tribuna Sever, and Polish Torcida Górnik fan group from Górnik Zabrze. Torcida has a long friendship with the Portuguese fan group No Name Boys from Benfica.

== History ==
Torcida was founded in 1950 by a group of sailors from Korčula who had witnessed the passion of the crowd at the World Cup Final in Brazil. While their first official appearance at a game was on October 29, 1950 against Red Star Belgrade for the League of Yugoslavia title, the group started gathering and chanting more regularly in the center of the east stand in the early 1970s.

Hajduk Split supporters, Torcida, were formed on 28 October 1950 by a group of students in Zagreb, namely Ante Dorić, Vlado Mikulić, Šime Perković, Ante Ivanišević and Vjenceslav Žuvela. According to Dorić, the person who gave them the most incentive to form a group was the club legend Bernard Vukas. They took their name from the Brazilian fan group they idolized, which comes from the Portuguese torcer which means 'to cheer on'. "Hajduk lives forever" is their slogan.

During the late 1980s, Torcida's anthem was the song "Glasno, glasnije" ("Loud, Louder") by the Split hard rock band Osmi Putnik.

=== 2026 Ajax controversy ===
On 15 October 2026, as Hajduk Split hosted Dutch squad AFC Ajax as part of the UEFA Conference League, Torcida became involved in a major controversy after members of the fan club chanted pro–Nazi and antisemitic slogans in the Split city centre before the game. Some of the chants included "Trample, trample the Jews", "Auschwitz, Auschwitz", and "Rise, Adolf", referencing Adolf Hitler. Ajax, who lost the game 2–1, is noted as having a longstanding connection to the Jewish community in the Netherlands.

Before the match, Torcida members marched in a column led by a Volkswagen Golf Mk1 which was carrying a coffin on its roof with "Ajax" written on it. Volkswagen was founded by the German Labour Front, a Nazi-aligned organization, and has been used by various neo-Nazi movements.

The incidents were condemned by the mayor of Split, the Croatian government, and various Croatian political parties. A statement released by the Croatian government on X (formerly Twitter) said "such shameful behaviour represents a negation of sport and the democratic values that modern Croatia upholds." The President of Croatia, Zoran Milanović, said that "…measures and sanctions are necessary to demonstrate that there is no place in Croatia for the glorification of Nazism and the Ustaša ideology."

The far-right Homeland Movement political party criticized journalists for their coverage of the incidents, with party leader Ivan Penava accusing the media of conducting a "witch-hunt" against Torcida members. Images of 12 independent journalists were posted on the Torcida website in a format resembling "WANTED" posters, with the caption "Croatia has already seen all sorts of wonders, but it hasn't found enough rope for so many Judases." Prime Minister Andrej Plenković responded by confirming that "we always stand up for the journalists." At least 12 fans were arrested following the match in accordance with Article 325 of the Croatian Criminal Code.

The Israeli embassy in Croatia said it was "deeply shocked" by the events and "condemns them in the strongest way possible."

Hajduk Split published a formal apology after the match ended, in which they apologized to Ajax players and staff for having to witness these events, and acknowledging that the club could face a heavy punishment from UEFA.
