= Marcus Tanneberger =

German violinist

- Born: August 1987 (age 38); Berlin, Germany
- Occupations: Violinist; Pilot
- Years active: 1990–present

Marcus Tanneberger (born 1987 in Berlin) is a German violinist.

== Career ==
Tanneberger was born in Berlin. His parents arranged for him to have earliest violin instruction at the age of three and a half. He gave his first public performance at the age of five. First as a six-year-old and then when he was eight, he achieved the highest score when taking part in the nationwide Jugend musiziert music competition sponsored by the President of the Federal Republic of Germany and supported by the Federal Ministry of Family Affairs, Senior Citizens, Women and Youth.

Since September 1997 Tanneberger has been studying with Professor Ana Chumachenco at the Hochschule für Musik in Munich, Bavaria, Germany, where he was admitted for advanced placement study in 1998. He was a scholarship recipient of the Karl-Böhm-Stiftung in Munich from 1997 to 2001, enabling him to perform in several concerts in Germany and abroad.

From among almost 211 competitors, in May 2006 he received 3rd Grand Prize at the Montreal International Music Competition.

His awards until now include 1st Prize at the Third International Louis Spohr Competition for young violinists, Weimar, in October 2001, and 3rd prize at the International Yehudi Menuhin Competition, France, April 2002. In November 2003 Marcus Tanneberger was a prize-winner at the Fifth Leopold Mozart International Violin Competition in Augsburg. In January 2004 he received 1st prize with the highest score at the "Jugend musiziert" Competition as well as special prizes of the “Sparkasse Bayreuth” and the "Deutsche Stiftung Musikleben".

Tanneberger is the first violinist of the Appassionata String Quartet of Würzburg, Germany, which was founded in 2007 at Hochschule für Musik Würzburg.

In addition to his career as a violinist, since November 2007, he has been completing a pilot training program with Lufthansa in Bremen, Germany. He successfully completed this apprenticeship in 2009.

== Repertoire ==
His repertoire covers sonatas of Ludwig van Beethoven, Johannes Brahms, Antonín Dvořák, Eduard Franck, Wolfgang Amadeus Mozart, Franz Schubert, and Giuseppe Tartini as well as virtuoso pieces of Antonín Dvořák, Fritz Kreisler, Jules Massenet, Niccolò Paganini, Camille Saint-Saëns, Pablo de Sarasate, and Friedrich Smetana as well as Violin Concertos von Max Bruch, Édouard Lalo, Felix Mendelssohn Bartholdy, Wolfgang Amadeus Mozart, Jean Sibelius, Henri Vieuxtemps und Henryk Wieniawski.

== Performances ==
As a Soloist he performed with several Orchestras just like Staatskapelle Weimar, Münchner Rundfunkorchester, Montreal Symphony Orchestra, Hofer Symphoniker, Youth Orchestra Baden-Baden, RIAS Youth Orchestra Berlin, Symphony Orchestra Bad Reichenhall, the symphony orchestra of Hochschule für Musik Franz Liszt, Weimar as well as the Youth Symphony Orchestra Munich.

He performed with Igor Oistrakh, Muhai Tang, Christoph Poppen, Howard Golden, Markus Poschner, and George Alexander Albrecht and played concerts with Veronika Eberle, Herbert Schuch, Volker Hiemeyer, Milana Chernyavskaya, Dudana Mazmanishvili and Yumiko Urabe, as well as being a member of the Appassionata String Quartet in Würzburg, Bavaria.

The musical press acknowledged his brilliant technique, intensity, and high degree of musical sensitivity and strength of expression. Audiences honoured his performances with ovations.

== Violins ==
In recognition of winning various prizes at the Deutscher Musikinstrumentenfonds Music Competition, Marcus Tanneberger performed on violins from 2006 to 2013 on loan to him from the Deutsche Stiftung Musikleben, most recently on a Carlo Ferdinando Landolfi violin made in Milan, Italy in 1790, generously loaned to him by a Munich family.

== Awards ==
- 1st Prize at 3rd International Louis Spohr Competition for young violinists in Weimar, Thuringia, Germany (2001)
- 3rd Prize at International Yehudi Menuhin Competition in France (2002)
- 4th prize at 5th International Violin Competition Leopold Mozart in Augsburg, Bavaria, Germany (2003)
- 3rd Prize at Montreal International Musical Competition in Montréal, Québec, Canada (2006)
- 1st Prize at Jugend musiziert Competition in Germany
- 1st Prize at "Jugend Musiziert" Competition – Bavaria, Germany, Special Award of Sparkasse Bayreuth, Special Award of Deutsche Stiftung Musikleben
- Alois Kottmann Award of violinist Alois Kottmann during International Days of Music Hesse Main-Taunus Hofheim in Frankfurt/Hofheim am Taunus, Hesse, Germany (2009)

== Video on Demand ==
- Franck: Violin Sonata with Marcus Tanneberger, Montréal, Canada (13:38 min.)
- Haydn: Sunrise, Würzburger Appassionato Streichquartett with Marcus Tanneberger (8:49 min.)
- Haydn: Sunrise, Würzburger Appassionato Streichquartett with Marcus Tanneberger (5:29 min.)
