= André Silva =

André Silva or André da Silva may refer to:

== Sportspeople ==
=== Association football ===
- André Silva (footballer, born February 1980), Brazilian football midfielder
- André Silva (footballer, born April 1980), Brazilian football defensive midfielder
- André Silva (footballer, born 1995), Portuguese football striker
- André Silva (footballer, born 1997), Brazilian football forward for São Paulo
- André Silva (footballer, born 2000) (2000–2025), Portuguese football attacking midfielder

=== Rugby ===
- André Silva (rugby union, born 1975), French-born Portuguese rugby union player
- André Silva (rugby union, born 1988), played for Brazil at the 2015 Pan American Games

=== Other sports ===
- André Silva (handballer), Brazilian handballer, playing for Handebol Clube Taubaté
- André Silva (table tennis), Portuguese table tennis player, playing for Sporting Clube de Portugal
- André Domingos (André Domingos da Silva), (born 1972), Brazilian track athlete

== Other people ==
- André da Silva Gomes (1752–1844), Portuguese-Brazilian composer
- André Silva (politician) (born 1976), Portuguese politician

== See also ==
- Paulo Silva (volleyball) (Paulo André Jukoski da Silva, born 1963), Brazilian volleyballer
- Pinga (footballer, born 1981) (André Luciano da Silva, born 1981), Brazilian footballer
- Sandro André da Silva (born 1974), former Brazilian footballer
- Luís André da Silva (born 1972), former Brazilian footballer
- Andrés Silva (born 1986), Uruguayan track athlete
- André Ramalho (André Ramalho Silva, born 1992), Brazilian footballer
- André Clóvis (André Clóvis Silva Filho, born 1997), Brazilian footballer
