= 2004–05 Croatian First Football League =

Prva HNL Ožujsko
- Season: 2004–05
- Champions: Hajduk Split; 6th Croatian title 18th domestic title
- Runner up: Inter Zaprešić
- Relegated: Zadar
- Champions League: Hajduk Split
- UEFA Cup: Inter Zaprešić; Rijeka
- Intertoto Cup: Varteks; Slaven Belupo
- Matches: 192
- Goals: 519 (2.7 per match)
- Best player: Mladen Bartolović
- Top goalscorer: Tomislav Erceg (17)
- Biggest home win: Dinamo Z. 7–0 Zadar
- Biggest away win: Zadar 1–5 Slaven B.
- Highest scoring: Zagreb 7–1 Slaven B.
- Average attendance: 2,868

The 2004–05 Croatian First Football League (also known as 1. HNL; officially styled as Prva HNL Ožujsko for sponsorship reasons) was the fourteenth season of the Croatian First Football League, the national championship for men's association football teams in Croatia, since its establishment in 1992. The season started on 23 July 2004 and ended on 28 May 2005. Hajduk Split were the defending champions, having won their seventeenth championship title the previous season, and they defended the title again, after a win against Varteks on 28 May 2005.

== Teams ==
=== Stadia and personnel ===
Locations of teams in 2004–05 Prva HNL

Team	Manager^{1}	Location	Stadium	Capacity
Dinamo Zagreb	(Croatia) Zvjezdan Cvetković	Zagreb	Stadion Maksimir	37,168
Hajduk Split	(Croatia) Igor Štimac	Split	Stadion Poljud	35,000
Inter Zaprešić	(Croatia) Srećko Bogdan	Zaprešić	Stadion ŠRC Zaprešić	5,000
Kamen Ingrad	(Croatia) Hrvoje Braović	Velika	Stadion Kamen Ingrad	8,000
Međimurje	(Croatia) Miljenko Dovečer	Čakovec	Stadion SRC Mladost	8,000
Osijek	(Croatia) Stjepan Čordaš	Osijek	Stadion Gradski vrt	19,500
Pula 1856	(Croatia) Igor Pamić	Pula	Stadion Veruda	3,000
Rijeka	(Croatia) Elvis Scoria	Rijeka	Stadion Kantrida	10,275
Slaven Belupo	(Croatia) Branko Karačić	Koprivnica	Gradski stadion u Koprivnici	4,000
Varteks	(Croatia) Miroslav Blažević	Varaždin	Stadion Varteks	10,800
Zadar	(Croatia) Vjeran Simunić	Zadar	Stadion Stanovi	5,860
NK Zagreb	(Croatia) Mile Petković	Zagreb	Stadion Kranjčevićeva	8,850

- ^{1} On final match day of the season, played on 28 May 2005.

== First stage ==
Pos	Team	Pld	W	D	L	GF	GA	GD	Pts	Qualification
1	Hajduk Split	22	13	3	6	39	23	+16	42	Qualification to championship group
2	Rijeka	22	10	8	4	37	23	+14	38	Qualification to championship group
3	Slaven Belupo	22	11	4	7	29	25	+4	37	Qualification to championship group
4	Inter Zaprešić	22	10	5	7	25	22	+3	35	Qualification to championship group
5	Varteks	22	11	1	10	39	30	+9	34	Qualification to championship group
6	NK Zagreb	22	10	3	9	27	24	+3	33 (Note: Head-to-head record: NK Zagreb–Dinamo Zagreb 2–1, Dinamo Zagreb–NK Zagreb 1–2.)	Qualification to championship group
7	Dinamo Zagreb	22	9	6	7	38	30	+8	33	Qualification to relegation group
8	Kamen Ingrad	22	10	2	10	30	28	+2	32	Qualification to relegation group
9	Osijek	22	7	9	6	29	32	−3	30	Qualification to relegation group
10	Pula 1856	22	6	8	8	21	23	−2	26	Qualification to relegation group
11	Zadar	22	5	1	16	25	55	−30	16	Qualification to relegation group
12	Međimurje	22	3	4	15	18	42	−24	13	Qualification to relegation group

Source: RSSSF.org
Rules for classification: 1st points; 2nd head-to-head points; 3rd head-to-head goal difference; 4th head-to-head away goals scored

=== Rounds 1–22 results ===
Home \ Away	DIN	HAJ	INT	KAM	MEĐ	OSI	PUL	RIJ	SLA	VAR	ZAD	ZAG
Dinamo Zagreb		3–0	2–0	2–1	4–1	0–0	3–0	1–1	1–2	2–1	2–1	1–2
Hajduk Split	1–0		2–0	2–0	2–0	1–1	1–1	2–0	2–1	3–1	4–0	2–4
Inter Zaprešić	1–0	1–3		0–0	3–0	1–3	0–0	2–2	2–0	3–2	4–1	1–0
Kamen Ingrad	0–0	2–1	0–1		2–0	3–1	1–0	3–2	2–0	3–2	2–0	4–1
Međimurje	1–3	1–3	0–0	1–4		2–2	1–1	1–2	0–1	2–0	4–0	0–1
Osijek	1–1	2–2	2–0	2–0	0–0		2–1	1–1	1–1	1–3	3–1	1–1
Pula 1856	3–3	0–1	1–1	1–0	2–1	2–0		0–0	2–0	3–0	2–0	1–1
Rijeka	4–2	2–0	2–0	2–1	3–1	4–0	1–1		1–1	3–0	2–0	2–1
Slaven Belupo	3–1	1–0	2–1	4–1	2–0	1–2	1–0	0–0		0–1	1–0	1–1
Varteks	2–2	0–4	0–1	3–0	5–0	4–0	1–0	2–0	6–0		3–0	1–0
Zadar	3–4	1–3	0–2	2–1	2–1	2–4	3–0	2–2	1–5	3–1		2–1
NK Zagreb	2–1	2–0	0–1	1–0	0–1	1–0	2–0	2–1	0–2	0–1	4–1	

Source: RSSSF.org
Legend: Blue = home team win; Yellow = draw; Red = away team win.

== Championship group ==
Pos	Team	Pld	W	D	L	GF	GA	GD	Pts	Qualification
1	Hajduk Split (C)	32	16	8	8	58	33	+25	56	Qualification to Champions League second qualifying round
2	Inter Zaprešić	32	15	9	8	44	39	+5	54	Qualification to UEFA Cup second qualifying round
3	NK Zagreb	32	15	5	12	50	42	+8	50	
4	Rijeka	32	11	14	7	52	40	+12	47	Qualification to UEFA Cup second qualifying round
5	Varteks	32	14	3	15	53	50	+3	45	Qualification to Intertoto Cup first round
6	Slaven Belupo	32	12	9	11	37	41	−4	45	Qualification to Intertoto Cup first round

Source: RSSSF.org
Rules for classification: 1st points; 2nd head-to-head points; 3rd head-to-head goal difference; 4th head-to-head away goals scored
(C) Champions

=== Rounds 23–32 results ===
Home \ Away	HAJ	INT	RIJ	SLA	VAR	ZAG
Hajduk Split		5–1	1–1	0–0	6–0	0–1
Inter Zaprešić	1–1		3–2	2–1	2–0	1–1
Rijeka	1–1	3–3		0–0	1–1	4–2
Slaven Belupo	1–1	0–1	1–1		2–2	2–0
Varteks	1–2	1–2	3–1	2–0		3–1
NK Zagreb	3–2	3–3	2–1	7–1	3–1	

Source: RSSSF.org
Legend: Blue = home team win; Yellow = draw; Red = away team win.

== Relegation group ("Liga za bedaka") ==
Pos	Team	Pld	W	D	L	GF	GA	GD	Pts	Relegation
7	Dinamo Zagreb	32	12	11	9	55	37	+18	47	
8	Osijek	32	9	14	9	41	45	−4	41	
9	Kamen Ingrad	32	12	5	15	36	39	−3	41	
10	Pula 1856	32	7	14	11	28	31	−3	35	
11	Međimurje (O)	32	9	6	17	29	52	−23	33	Qualification to relegation play-off
12	Zadar (R)	32	10	2	20	36	70	−34	32	Relegation to Croatian Second Football League

Source: RSSSF.org
Rules for classification: 1st points; 2nd head-to-head points; 3rd head-to-head goal difference; 4th head-to-head away goals scored
(O) Play-off winners; (R) Relegated

=== Rounds 23–32 results ===
Home \ Away	DIN	KAM	MEĐ	OSI	PUL	ZAD
Dinamo Zagreb		0–0	5–1	3–3	0–0	7–0
Kamen Ingrad	0–1		0–1	2–0	1–1	1–0
Međimurje	2–1	1–0		2–2	1–0	1–0
Osijek	0–0	3–0	1–2		1–0	1–1
Pula 1856	0–0	1–1	0–0	1–1		3–1
Zadar	1–0	3–1	1–0	2–0	2–1	

Source: RSSSF.org
Legend: Blue = home team win; Yellow = draw; Red = away team win.

=== Relegation play-off ===
==== First leg ====
1 June 2005

Međimurje	2–0	Novalja
Silva 29'; Dujmović 78'	Report (in Croatian)

Stadion SRC Mladost, Čakovec
Attendance: 1,500
Referee: Marijo Strahonja (Zagreb)

==== Second leg ====
5 June 2005

Novalja	1–1	Međimurje
Con 52'	Report (in Croatian)	Šarić 90'

Stadion Poljud, Split
Attendance: 1,000
Referee: Ante Vučemilović (Osijek)

Međimurje win 3–1 on aggregate.

== Top goalscorers ==
Rank	Player	Club	Goals
1	(Croatia) Tomislav Erceg	Rijeka	17
2	(Croatia) Ivica Žuljević	Međimurje	12
3	(Croatia) Tomislav Bušić	Hajduk Split	11
3	(Croatia) Stjepan Jukić	Osijek	11
3	(Croatia) Ivica Karabogdan	Slaven Belupo	11
3	(Croatia) Karlo Primorac	Osijek	11
7	(Croatia) Leonardo Barnjak	Zadar	10
7	(Croatia) Ivan Bošnjak	Dinamo Zagreb	10
7	(Croatia) Eduardo da Silva	Dinamo Zagreb	10
10	(Bosnia and Herzegovina) Mladen Bartolović	Zagreb	9
10	(Bosnia and Herzegovina) Dragan Blatnjak	Hajduk Split	9
10	(Bosnia and Herzegovina) Nedim Halilović	Varteks	9
10	(Croatia) Goran Ljubojević	Dinamo Zagreb	9

Source: 1.hnl.net (in Croatian)

== Attendances ==
#	Club	Average
1	Hajduk	7,750
2	Rijeka	4,250
3	Dinamo Zagreb	2,806
4	Osijek	2,400
5	Slaven	2,275
6	Varteks	2,125
7	Zadar	2,119
8	Zaprešić	2,113
9	Zagreb	1,813
10	Istra	1,644
11	Međimurje	1,463
12	Kamen	1,431

== See also ==
- 2004–05 Croatian Second Football League
- 2004–05 Croatian Football Cup
