= Richard Rudolf Klein =

German composer (1921–2011)

Richard Rudolf Klein (21 May 1921 in Nußdorf/Pfalz – 17 December 2011) was a German composer, musician, and teacher. His compositional output is diverse, including nursery rhymes and music for children, choral music and hymns, incidental music, and orchestral music, as well as chamber music.

== Life ==
Klein attended the humanistic Gymnasium in Landau, Germany and learned to play the piano, the violin, and the viola. He later learned the trumpet and the organ. He started composing at a young age and as an adolescent had already conducted his own works with his school orchestra on the occasion of school and commemorative events. In 1935, at the age of fourteen, he started performing piano pieces and songs in broadcasts at the former Rundfunk-Sender Kaiserslautern.

His teachers included Wolfgang Fortner (composition), Hans Grischkat and Karl Münchinger (conducting), as well as Philipp Mohler.

In 1948, when he was 27, Klein received a lecturing position for music theory at the University of Music in Stuttgart, and one year later he became lecturer of music theory at the Nordwestdeutsche Musikakademie in Detmold.

From 1960 to 1984, he was a lecturer in composition, musical form, score reading, and basso continuo at the Frankfurt University of Music and Performing Arts. In 1965 he was appointed professor at the same institution. From 1985 to 1996 Klein lectured at Hoch Conservatory in Frankfurt.

For more than four decades Klein worked as a freelance music editor at the German publisher Fidula. Klein was committed to a variety of projects, and was a member of the jury for the Alois Kottmann Award for classical violin, playing along with the singer Agnes Giebel and violinist Alois Kottmann.

== Awards ==
- Hesse State Cross of Merit (1990)
