= Sporting CP (disambiguation) =

Sporting CP is a sports club, best known for its association football team, based in Lisbon, Portugal.

Sporting CP may also refer to other sections of the club, including:

- Sporting CP (athletics)
- Sporting CP (basketball)
- Sporting CP (beach soccer)
- Sporting CP (billiards)
- Sporting CP (cycling team)
- Sporting CP eSports
- Sporting CP (futsal)
- Sporting CP (handball)
- Sporting CP (roller hockey)
- Sporting CP (rugby union)
- Sporting CP (Superleague Formula team)
- Sporting CP (swimming)
- Sporting CP (table tennis)
- Sporting CP (volleyball)
- Sporting CP (women's football)
- Sporting CP/Tavira, now Atum General–Tavira–Maria Nova Hotel, a cycling team
