= Chen Jiayu =

Portuguese footballer

Chen Jiayu 陈佳裕
Personal information
- Full name: Francisco Jiayu Chen
- Date of birth: 14 July 1993 (age 33)
- Place of birth: Lisbon, Portugal
- Height: 1.78 m (5 ft 10 in)
- Position: Left-back

Youth career
- 2005–2013: Pescadores
- 2014–2015: Mafra

Senior career*
Years	Team	Apps	(Gls)
2013–2014	Pescadores	1	(0)
2015–2016	Loures	13	(0)
2016–2017	Tourizense	3	(0)
2017–2022	Cova da Piedade	1	(0)
2021	→ Hebei FC (loan)	0	(0)
2021	→ Heilongjiang Ice City (loan)	0	(0)
2022	Villa AC		
2023	Clube Olímpico do Montijo		
2024–2025	Cova da Piedade		
- * Club domestic league appearances and goals as of 12 March 2018

Chen Jiayu
- Chinese: 陈佳裕
Transcriptions
Standard Mandarin
- Hanyu Pinyin: Chén Jiāyù

Chen Jiayu (Chinese: 陈佳裕; pinyin: Chén Jiāyù; birth name Francisco Chen, nickname Chico Chen; born 14 July 1993) is a Portuguese professional footballer. Born in Portugal, he renounced his Portuguese passport to receive the Chinese citinzenship in 2016.

== Club career ==
Chen was born in Lisbon to father Chen Shichao (Chinese: 陈仕超), a professional table tennis player. Chen Shichao originates from Guangzhou, the People's Republic of China and emigrated to Portugal after he accepted the invitation of Portuguese table tennis club Sporting CP in 1989. Chen joined Pescadores's youth academy and was promoted to the first team in 2013. On 14 September 2013, he made his senior debut in a 2–2 away draw against União de Tomar, coming on as a substitute for Charles Oliveira in the 86th minute.

Chen joined Chinese holding club Mafra in 2014. He moved to Loures in the summer of 2015. He made his debut for the club on 23 August 2015 in a 0–0 home draw to 1º de Dezembro. After making 13 appearances in the 2015–16 season, he joined another Campeonato de Portugal team Tourizense in July 2016. He made his debut on 21 August 2016, playing the whole match in a 1–1 home draw against Mortágua.

On 18 August 2017, Chen transferred to LigaPro side Cova da Piedade. On 12 May 2018, he made his debut in LigaPro in a 3–2 win over União da Madeira.

== Personal life ==
Chen's father Chen Shichao is currently the men's and women's table tennis team coach of Sporting CP. His younger brother Diogo Chen (Chen Jiahong) is a table tennis player for Sporting CP and Portugal. Chen Jiayu renounced Portuguese nationality and acquired Chinese nationality in March 2016.

== Career statistics ==
As of 12 May 2018.

Club performance			League		Cup		League Cup		Continental		Total	
Season	Club	League	Apps	Goals	Apps	Goals	Apps	Goals	Apps	Goals	Apps	Goals
Portugal			League		Taça de Portugal		Taça da Liga		Europe		Total	
2013–14	Pescadores	AF Setúbal 1ª divisão	1	0	-		-		-		1	0
2015–16	Loures	Campeonato de Portugal	13	0	1	0	-		-		14	0
2016–17	Tourizense	Campeonato de Portugal	3	0	1	0	-		-		4	0
2017–18	Cova da Piedade	LigaPro	1	0	0	0	0	0	-		1	0
Total	Portugal		18	0	2	0	0	0	0	0	20	0
Career total			18	0	2	0	0	0	0	0	20	0
