= Bojidara Kouzmanova =

- Born: 1977
- Origin: Plovdiv, Bulgaria
- Genres: Classic
- Instrument: Violin

Bojidara Kouzmanova (born 1977 in Plovdiv, Bulgaria) is a violinist.

== Education ==
She studied at the National School of Music "Lyubomir Pipkov" in Sofia and at the University of Music and Performing Arts Vienna. She participated in violin courses with Prof. Munteanu (Romania) in 1994, Vanja Milanova (Bulgaria) and Michael Barta (United States) from 1995 to 1999, with José Luis Garcia (Spain) and with Alois Kottmann (Germany) in 1999 and 2000, and with Vladimir Spivakov (Russia) in 2000.

== Performances ==
As a soloist Kouzmanova has played with Prague Radio Symphony Orchestra, Plovdiv Philharmonic Orchestra, Rousse Philharmonic Orchestra, Varna Philharmonic Orchestra, Vratza Philharmonic Orchestra, Vidin Philharmonic Orchestra, Youth Orchestra "Plovdiv", Bohuslav Martunu Philharmonic Orchestra, Sofia Symphonic Orchestra, Bachsolisten (Vienna), Neues Orchester Basel (Switzerland), Kottmann Streicher, Montevideo Symphony Orchestra, Uruguay others.

Kouzmanova has appeared in Australia, Austria, France, Germany, Greece, Israel, Italy, Portugal, Slovakia, Spain, Uruguay and in the USA.

Several composers (R. Dimitrov, M. Kerer, P. Liakakis, J. Purgina, P. Richter, T. Wally among others) dedicated violin compositions to her, some of which she has premiered.

== Recordings ==
Her first CD recording was in 1996 with Plovdiv Philharmonic Orchestra under the baton of Nayden Todorov, playing the Bruch Violin concerto No. 1 and Mendelssohn Violin concerto. She has also recorded the violin concerti by Karen De Pastel, Sergei Prokofiev and Erich Wolfgang Korngold and has done several CDs with works for violin and piano, recorded with the violin Stradivarius "Da Vinci" (1725) on loan to her from Dietmar Machold.

== Violins ==
Miss Kouzmanova has played various famous instruments, most of them loaned to her by Dietmar Machold of Machold Rare Violins. She has played Stradivari violins from 1681 ("Reynier"), 1716 ("ex Nachez"), 1717, 1725 ("Da Vinci"), and 1732 ("Red Diamond"); a Pietro Guarneri (1735); a Guarneri del Gesu (1741 "ex Hubermann"), and several newly made violins, including a Gerlinde Reutterer (2004) and a Stefan-Peter Greiner. Since 2008, she has played her own instrument by Matthieu Devuyst.

== Awards ==
- 1995: International competition "Music and the Earth" - 2nd Prize
- 1995: National Violin Competition for German Music - Bourgas - 1st and Special Prize
- 1995: "Bela Bartok" competition - 1st Prize
- 1995: "Dobrin Petkov" Violin competition - 3rd Prize and Special Prize for youngest participant
- 1996: Second competition "Young musicians" - Sofia - 1st Prize
- 2000: Hudson Valley String Competition (USA) - 3rd Prize
- 2001: Alois Kottmann Award during International Days of Music Hesse Main-Taunus Hofheim, Frankfurt am Main, Hesse, Germany

== Audio on Demand ==
- Pablo de Sarasate: Zigeunerweisen. Soloist: Bojidara Kouzmanova. Vienna Philharmonic Women's Orchestra conducted by Izabella Shareyko (10:00 min.)
- Sergio Navatta: Tanggara. Soloist: Bojidara Kouzmanova. Julián Bello (p). (6:27 min.)
