= Agnes Giebel =

German classical soprano (1921–2017)

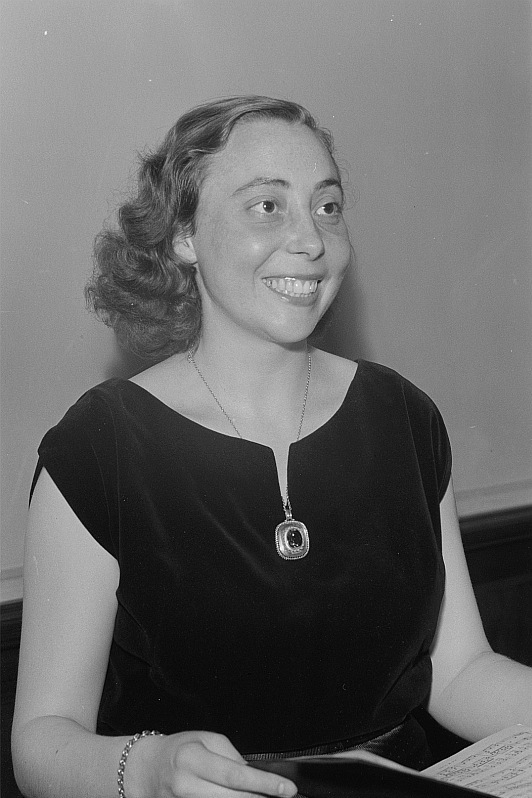
Agnes Giebel, 1953

Agnes Giebel (10 August 1921 – 24 April 2017) was a German classical soprano. She was born in Heerlen, in the Netherlands, where she lived the first years of her life. She studied at the Folkwangschule in Essen and made her first public appearance as a singer in 1947. Her career lasted until the 1990s during which she established a wide-ranging discography.

Giebel's repertoire consisted predominantly of sacred works of music such as cantatas, oratorios, passions, and masses. As an interpreter of lieder she often performed with the pianist Sebastian Peschko. She was also known for her performance in Beethoven's Ninth Symphony under the direction of Otto Klemperer.

Giebel lived in Cologne. Her daughter, Kristina Kanders, and her granddaughter, Julia Giebel, are also musicians. For the Alois Kottmann Award she was member of the jury panel along composer Richard Rudolf Klein, the violinists Alois Kottmann and Boris Kottmann as well as singer Margit Neubauer.

She died in Cologne on 24 April 2017, aged 95.
