= Kottmann =

Kottmann may refer to:

- Alois Kottmann (1929–2021), German violinist and university professor
- Angelika Schaffar-Kottmann (born 1967), German violinist
- Boris Kottmann (born 1964), German violinist
- Gottfried Kottmann (1932–1964), Swiss rower
- Volker Kottmann (1937–2016), German soccer coach
- Marco Kottmann (born 1980), Swiss football midfielder
- maia arson crimew, formerly Tillie Kottmann, (1999-), Swiss computer hacker

== See also ==
- Alois Kottmann Award for classical canto-style play of the violin
