= Kettmann =

Kettmann is a surname. Notable people with the surname include:

- George Kettmann (1898–1970), Dutch writer and publisher
- Steve Kettmann, American writer and editor

== See also ==
- Kottmann
