= Ivica Žuljević =

Croatian footballer

Personal information
- Date of birth: 24 May 1980 (age 46)
- Place of birth: Hofheim, West Germany
- Position: Forward

Senior career*
Years	Team	Apps	(Gls)
–2000	Mosor		
2000–2003	Uskok		
2003–2005	Međimurje	32	(12)
2005	Excelsior Mouscron	0	(0)
2006	Metalurh Donetsk	1	(0)
2006	Hapoel Petah Tikva	7	(0)
2006–2007	Trogir		
2008	Mosor		
2008–2010	Međimurje	23	(2)
2012–2014	Dugopolje	44	(18)
- * Club domestic league appearances and goals

Ivica Žuljević (born 24 May 1980) is a Croatian retired football forward.

== Career ==
He joined Belgian top-tier side Excelsior Mouscron from Međimurje in June 2005, only to leave them two months later citing personal reasons.
