= Junior (footballer, born 1971) =

Brazilian footballer

Personal information
- Full name: Mario dos Santos Júnior
- Date of birth: 27 October 1971 (age 55)
- Height: 1.80 m (5 ft 11 in)
- Position: Forward

Senior career*
Years	Team	Apps	(Gls)
1995	Guaçuano		
1995–1996	FC Lokomotiv Nizhny Novgorod	12	(1)
1996	→ FC Lokomotiv-d Nizhny Novgorod (loan)	8	(2)
- * Club domestic league appearances and goals

Mario dos Santos Júnior or simply Junior (born 27 October 1971) is a former Brazilian football player. He and Luís André da Silva were the first Brazilian players in the Russian Football Premier League when they joined FC Lokomotiv Nizhny Novgorod in 1995.
