= Igor Mostarlić =

Croatian footballer

Personal information
- Date of birth: 31 May 1983 (age 43)
- Place of birth: Zagreb, Croatia
- Height: 1.83 m (6 ft 0 in)
- Position: Striker

Youth career
- Dinamo Zagreb
- 2001–2002: Pisa

Senior career*
| Years | Team | Apps | (Gls) |
| 2002 | Udarnik | | |
| 2003 | Maribor | 13 | (7) |
| 2004 | Bela Krajina | | |
| 2005 | Pula | 8 | (1) |
| 2005–2006 | Međimurje | 30 | (11) |
| 2006–2007 | Osijek | 15 | (2) |
| 2007 | → Maccabi Herzliya (loan) | 11 | (3) |
| 2007–2008 | Međimurje | 2 | (0) |
| 2008 | Posušje | 2 | (0) |
| 2008–2009 | Radnik Velika Gorica | 15 | (0) |
| 2009 | Jedinstvo Bihać | 8 | (8) |
| 2010 | Sloboda Tuzla | 11 | (2) |
| 2010 | NK Gradići | | |
| 2011 | Krško | 20 | (11) |
| 2012 | Gorica | 10 | (3) |
| 2012–2013 | Udarnik | | |
| 2013- | Savski Marof | | |

International career^{‡}
| 1999 | Croatia U-17 | 3 | (0) |
- * Club domestic league appearances and goals as of 2 February 2012 ‡ National team caps and goals as of 2 February 2012

Igor Mostarlić (born 31 May 1983) is a Croatian retired football player. He is now Sports director of the Gorica futsal team.

== Club career ==
As a youngster, he joined Italian side Pisa from the Dinamo Zagreb academy aged 17, only to have his contract terminated after he broke his leg in a tournament between the lower league players in his hometown Velika Gorica. Mostarlić later played for Pula 1856, Međimurje and Osijek in the Croatian Prva HNL. He also had spells in Slovenia, Israel and Bosnia and Herzegovina, where he signed for Sloboda Tuzla in January 2010.
