= Diogo Chen =

Portuguese table tennis player

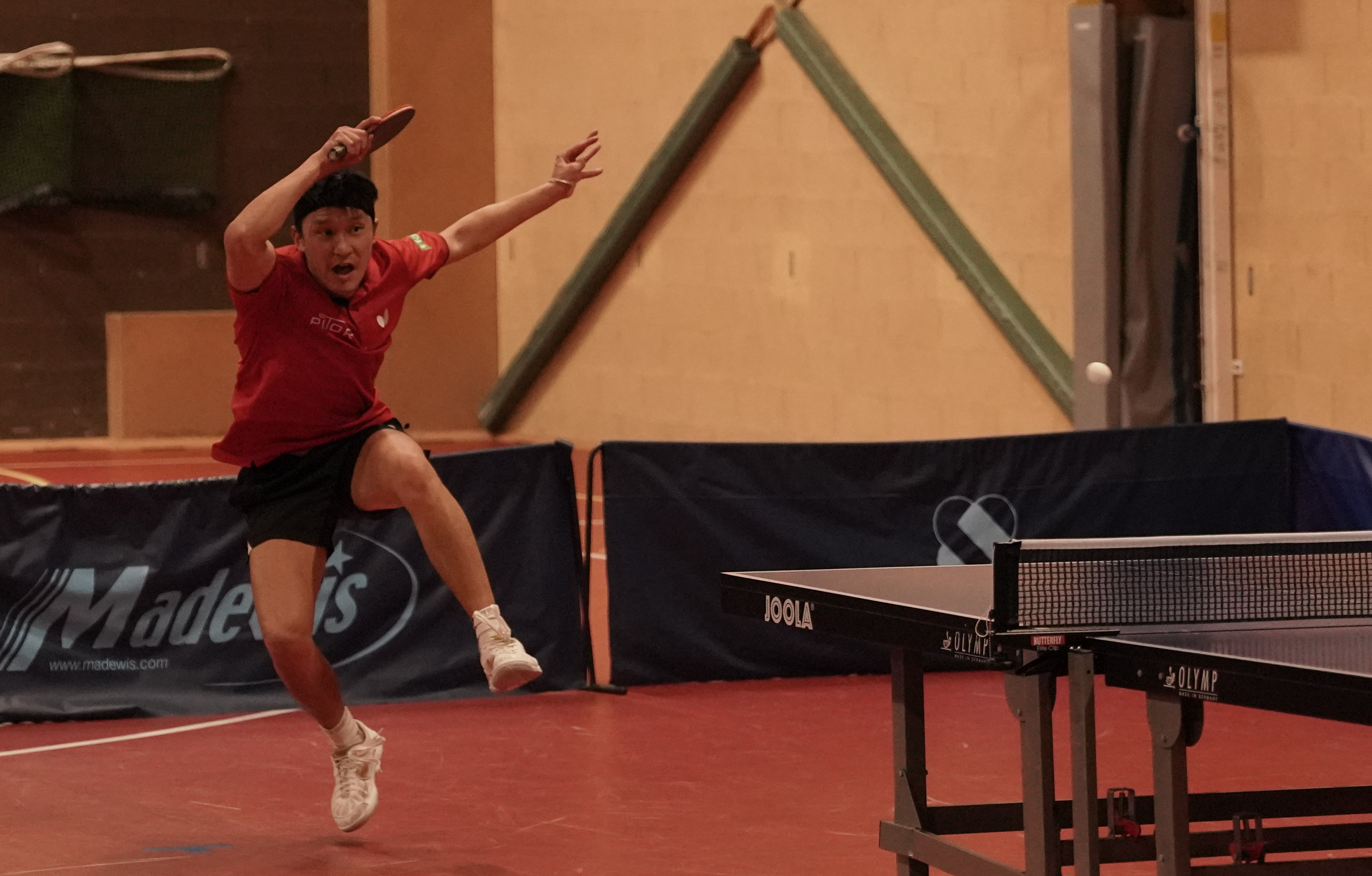
Diogo Chen

Diogo Jiahong Chen (born 1996) is a Portuguese table tennis player. He has been trained since an early age by Sporting CP, and professionally represents them at club level.

== Career ==
Diogo Chen was born in 1996, in Almada, Portugal. He has been trained at Sporting CP since 2002, where he was coached by his father, Chen Shichao. He is one of the most decorated table tennis players developed by the club. With a successful career in the sport, both at the club and with the Portuguese national table tennis team, Diogo has won several international medals and national titles. He made his senior debut in 2010 at the age of fourteen and joined Sporting CP's first team in 2012. A Portuguese international at the highest level, he became European team champion in 2014, an unprecedented feat for Portugal, having already won other medals in team competitions with the national team. He left Sporting CP in 2017 to play for TTC Frickenhausen in Germany, returning to Sporting CP after four seasons with Metz TT in France. A national senior champion for Sporting CP in 2016, 2020, and 2024, he has also won Portuguese Cups and Super Cups.
