= Sporting CP (billiards) =

Sporting Clube de Portugal
- Full name: Sporting Clube de Portugal
- Nicknames: Leões (Lions); Verde-e-Brancos (Green'n'Whites)
- Short name: Sporting
- Chairman: Frederico Varandas
- Manager: Victor Manuel de Jesus Salgado
- League: Portuguese Billiards League

Sporting Clube de Portugal is a professional billiards team based in Lisbon, Portugal, founded in 1930. The team competes in the Portuguese Billiards League and in European championships, in both carom billiards (three-cushion) and pool (eight-ball and nine-ball) events. The team includes some players from Belgium, France and Spain.

== Honours ==
=== Three-cushion ===
==== Men ====
- Portuguese Three-cushion Men's Billiards League

- Winners (17): 1964–65, 1967–68, 1969–70, 1972–73, 1973–74, 1977–78, 1979–80, 1981–82, 1989–90, 1990–91, 1995–96, 1996–97, 1997–98, 1998–99, 2003–04, 2007–08, 2014–15

- Portuguese Three-cushion Men's Billiards Cup

- Winners (4): 1964–65, 1995–96, 1996–97, 1997–98

- Portuguese Three-cushion Men's Billiards Super Cup

- Winners (5): 1995–96, 1996–97, 1998–99, 2003–04, 2004–05

- European Three-cushion Billiards Cup

- Silver (3): 1995–96, 2001–02, 2004–05

=== Pool ===
==== Men ====
- Portuguese Pool Men's Billiards League

- Winners (3): 1997–98, 1998–99, 2015–16

- Portuguese Pool Men's Billiards Cup

- Winners (4): 1997–98, 1998–99, 2000–01, 2015–16

- Portuguese Pool Men's Billiards Super Cup

- Winners (4): 1998–99, 1999–00, 2001–02, 2016–17

==== Women ====
- Portuguese Pool Women's Billiards League

- Winners (4): 1998–99, 1999–00, 2000–01, 2001–02

- Portuguese Pool Women's Billiards Cup

- Winners (1): 2000–01

- Portuguese Pool Women's Billiards Super Cup

- Winners (2): 1999–00, 2001–02

=== Portuguese Pool ===
==== Men ====
- National Portuguese Pool Men's Billiards League

- Winners (2): 2015–16, 2016–17

- National Portuguese Pool Men's Billiards Cup

- Winners (1): 2014–15

- National Portuguese Pool Men's Billiards Super Cup

- Winners (2): 2015–16, 2016–17

== Current squad ==
Name	Nat.
Frédéric Caudron	(Belgium)
Frans van Kuijk	(Netherlands)
Eddy Leppens	(Belgium)
Roland Forthomme	(Belgium)
Paul Stroobants	(Belgium)
Carlos Crespo	(Spain)
Jorge Theriaga	(Portugal)
José Luís Gaspar Santos	(Portugal)
António Saramago	(Portugal)
José Manuel Pássaro	(Portugal)
Mário Celestino Amâncio	(Portugal)
Luís Ventura	(Portugal)
Pedro Azevedo	(Portugal)

Name	Nat.
Rui Manuel Gil	(Portugal)
Júlio Rodrigues Cortes	(Portugal)
Rui Lopes Domingos	(Portugal)
António Barata	(Portugal)
José Paulo Dias	(Portugal)
Leonardo Angélico Horta	(Portugal)
António José Simões	(Portugal)

Name	Nat.
Luís Campos	(Portugal)
Manuel António Lains	(Portugal)
Raul Castanha	(Portugal)
Nelson Pereira	(Portugal)
Fernando Graça Águeda	(Portugal)
Manuel Petisca	(Portugal)
Carlos Alberto Alves	(Portugal)
Mário Amaro	(Portugal)

== Notable past athletes ==
- João Pereira
- Jorge Theriaga
- Rute Saraiva
- Alfredo Alhinho

== Technical staff ==
Name	Nat.	Job
Victor Manuel de Jesus Salgado	(Portugal)	Manager
José Luís Gaspar Santos	(Portugal)	Coordinator
Rui Manuel Aguiar Gil	(Portugal)	Coordinator
