= Da Silva (footballer, born 1972) =

Brazilian footballer

Personal information
- Full name: Luís André da Silva
- Date of birth: 3 March 1972 (age 54)
- Height: 1.79 m (5 ft 10 1/2 in)
- Position: Midfielder

Senior career*
Years	Team	Apps	(Gls)
1995	Fluminense (MG)		
1995	FC Lokomotiv Nizhny Novgorod	7	(1)
- * Club domestic league appearances and goals

Luís André da Silva or simply Da Silva (born 3 March 1972) is a former Brazilian football player. He and Mario dos Santos Júnior were the first Brazilian players in the Russian Football Premier League when they joined FC Lokomotiv Nizhny Novgorod in 1995.
