= André Silva (footballer, born February 1980) =

Brazilian footballer

Personal information
- Full name: André Silva Batista
- Date of birth: 20 February 1980 (age 46)
- Place of birth: Rio de Janeiro, Brazil
- Position: Defender

Senior career*
Years	Team	Apps	(Gls)
2002	NK Osijek		
2002–2003	NK Čakovec		
2003–2007	NK Međimurje	79	(2)
2007–2008	NK Croatia Sesvete		
2008–2011	NK Međimurje	23	(0)
2011–2012	NK Lučko	9	(0)
- * Club domestic league appearances and goals

André Silva Batista (born 20 February 1980) is a retired Brazilian football midfielder.
