= Alois Kottmann Award =

German classical music award

The Alois Kottmann Award is an international prize for "classical, cantando violin playing". It honours outstanding international violinists. The competition takes place annually in May and/or June during International Days of Music Hesse Main-Taunus Hofheim in Hofheim am Taunus, Hesse, Germany. After the competition, the award is presented on a separate date through the Lord Mayor of the city of Frankfurt am Main in the Limpurg Hall of the historic city hall Römer.

== History ==
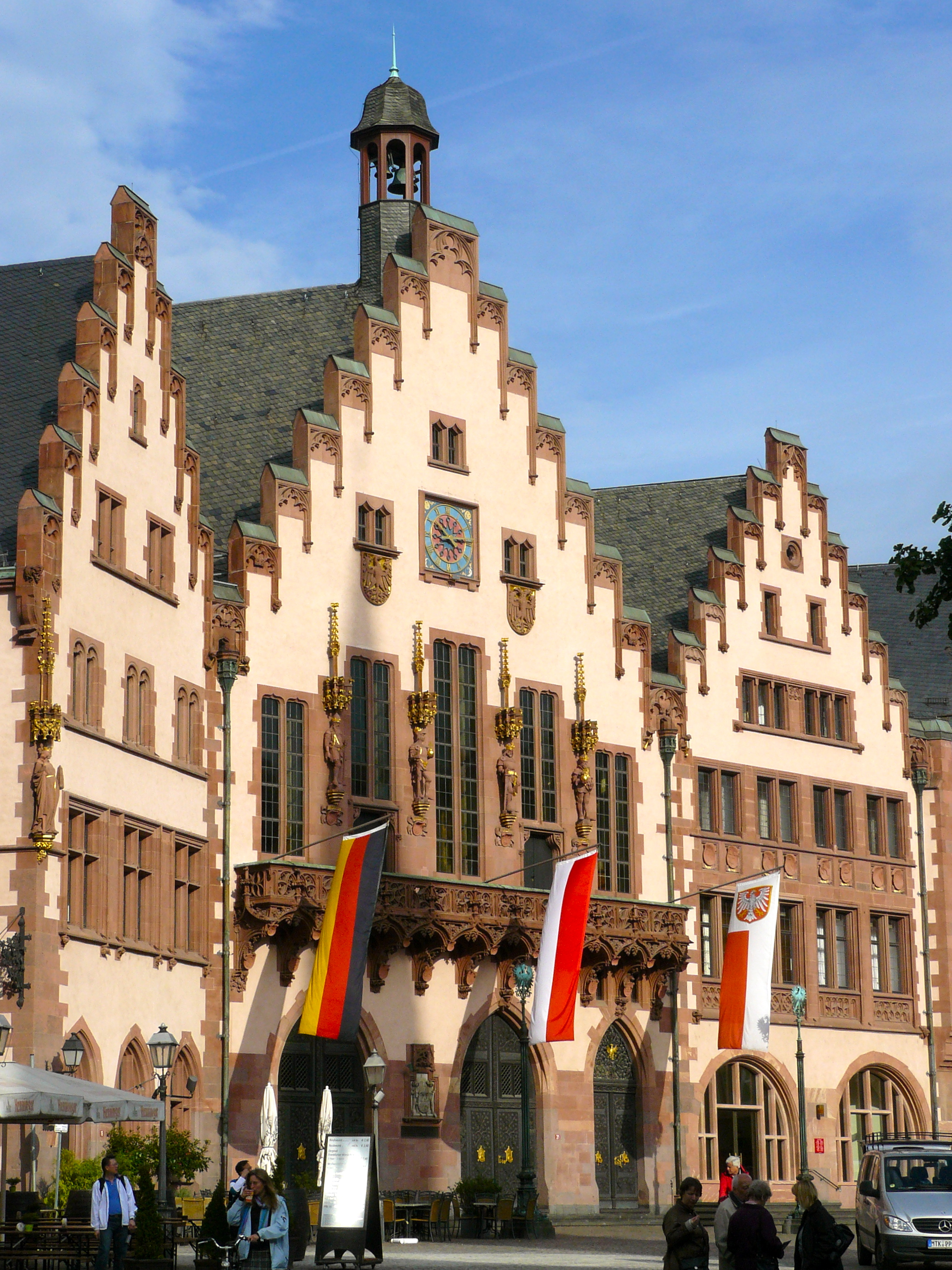
The Römer (city hall) in Frankfurt am Main, where the award ceremony takes place

The Alois Kottmann Award was founded and donated in 2001. It is named after its founder and benefactor, the German violinist and university professor Alois Kottmann.

During the first years of the competition, only one participant received an award and special prizes were offered to honour further special talents or performances. This changed in 2005 when two participants received awards. In the years 2006 and 2007, special appreciation awards were introduced along the main award and the special prizes. In addition, the unparalleled "Bach Award of the city of Hofheim am Taunus" was presented in 2007 to Sabrina-Vivian Höpcker (Germany). In 2010, first and second places of the Alois Kottmann Award were created, along with the special prizes. In addition, the title "Laudatory Appreciation" was introduced.

== Aim ==
The award is meant to aid and encourage the Frankfurt-based tradition of Carl Flesch which has its most prominent exponents in Alma Moodie and Max Rostal. The jury will place special emphasis on classical discipline, on an artistic and stylistic understanding of the performed works as well as a singing (cantando) style which signifies and characterises the personality of the artist.

"Outstanding violinists can be recognized by their tone, but with the young ones this is often not possible anymore. What is heard from them is performed speciously but without personality. The violin was created because man is able to sing also with it."
Professor h. c. Alois Kottmann (translated from German)

== Conditions ==
The award consists of 3,000 euro, a silver medal and a certificate. In addition, one or more special prizes will be awarded if applicable.

The competition is open for violinists internationally. There is no age restriction. During the competition musical pieces are required to be performed which are published one year in advance and will change annually. Memorised play is not required nor specially rated. Closing date for applications is in April.

The members of the judging panel are Margit Neubauer (singer), university professor Alois Kottmann (violin, benefactor and patron of the award), and Boris Kottmann (violin).

== Recipients ==
Year	Award recipient	Special prize	Appreciation
2001	Bojidara Kouzmanova, Bulgaria	Patricia Gross, Germany; Vivien Wald, Germany	
2002	Ara Lee, South-Korea	Giuseppe Carotenuto, Italy; Almut Frenzel, Germany; Andrea E.-I. Kim, Germany; Vivien Wald, Germany	
2003	Maria Azova, Uzbekistan	Myung-Eun Lee, South Korea; Johanna Schlüter, Germany; David Schultheiss, Germany	
2004	Julia-Evelyn Zis, Poland	Almut Frenzel, Germany	Eun-Ae Kim, South Korea
2005	Aya Muraki, USA; Yoriko Muto, Japan	Marie-Luise Dingler, Germany; Dina Zemtsova, Russia	Anna Knopp, Austria; Viviane Waschbüsch, Germany
2006	Yeo Young Yoon, South Korea; Myung Eun Lee, South Korea	Zsuzsanna Czentnár, Hungary	Bahadir Arkiliç, Turkey
2007	Chloé Kiffer, France; Istvan Horvath, Germany	Rebecca Martin, Germany	Célia Schann, France
2008	Yan Yan Chang, China	Byol Kang, Germany; Martina Trumpp, Germany	
2009	Célia Schann, France; Marcus Tanneberger, Germany; Harim Chun, South Korea	Ludwig Dürichen, Germany	
2010	1. Jayoung Jeon, South Korea; 2. Oleksii Semenenko, Ukraine	Liv Migdal, Germany/Sweden; Katja Schott, Ukraine	C. Christopher, Taiwan
2011	Senta Johanna Kraemer, Germany	Saschka Haberl, Germany; Bo Xiang, China	
2012	not awarded	not awarded	Jon Hess-Andersen, Denmark; Stephanie Appelhans, Germany; Anna Neubert, Germany
2013	Olga Arnakuliyeva, Ukraine; Lisa Maria Schumann, Japan/Germany; Laura Zarina, Latvia	Brenda Frasier, US; Mika Seifert, Finland/Germany; Julia Weissmann, Russia	SuJin Ann, South Korea; Verena Kurz, Germany; Katja Pletzsch, Uzbekistan
2014	Verena Kurz, Germany; Antonia-Sophie Pechstaedt, Germany	Yonjoo Kang, South Korea; Sofia Roldan-Cativa, Argentina; Jeanine Thorpe, United Kingdom; Lea Hausmann, Germany	
2015	Yu Matsuda, Japan; Theresa Sophie Reustle, Germany	Johanna Radoy, Germany	Christine Elisabeth Müller, Germany
2018	Rachel Buquet, Germany; Lee Young Kim, South Korea	Tae-Keun Lee, Germany; Miryam Nothelfer, Germany; Michiko Yamada, Japan	Hannah Solveij Gramß, Germany; Roberta Verna, Germany
