= Miljenko Dovečer =

Croatian football manager

Personal information
- Date of birth: 9 November 1958 (age 68)
- Position: Left winger

Senior career*
| Years | Team | Apps | (Gls) |
| –1978 | Graničar Novakovec | | |
| 1978–1981 | Čakovec | | |
| 1981–1983 | Varteks | | |
| 1984–1985 | Sloga Čakovec | | |
| 1985–1991 | Nafta Lendava | | |
| 1992 | Čakovec | | |

Managerial career
- 2001–2003: Čakovec
- 2005–2006: Međimurje
- 2007–2008: Međimurje
- 2010–2011: Međimurje
- 2012–2013: Čakovec
- 2013–2014: Omladinac NSR
- 2017–2020: Međimurje
- 2020-2023: Omladinac NSR
- 2023-2024: Graničar Novakovec
- 2024-: Sokol Vratišinec
- * Club domestic league appearances and goals

Miljenko Dovečer (born 9 November 1958) is a Croatian retired footballer and manager.

== Playing career ==
Dovečer played for Graničar Novakovec, Čakovec, Varteks, and Nafta. He earned the distinction of scoring the very first goal of the Slovenian PrvaLiga in independent Slovenia.

== Managerial career ==
Dovečer replaced Predrag Jurić as manager of Međimurje in March 2005. In September 2007, he succeeded Ivan Bedi to become manager of Međimurje for a second time. In August 2013, Dovečer took charge of Omladinac Novo Selo Rok.

Dovečer was appointed sports director at Međimurje in June 2016.
