= Margit Neubauer =

Austrian operatic mezzo.soprano singer

- Born: 1951 (age 73–74); Linz, Austria
- Education: Anton Bruckner Conservatory
- Occupation: Operatic mezzo-soprano
- Organizations: Oper Frankfurt (1977–2016)

Margit Neubauer (born 1951) is an Austrian operatic mezzo-soprano who was for decades a member of the Oper Frankfurt. She appeared at international festivals such as the Salzburg Festival. Her repertory ranges from Baroque opera to premieres of new works.

== Career ==
Born in Linz, Upper Austria, Neubauer took voice lessons from age 16 and then studied at the Anton Bruckner Conservatory in Linz. She was from 1974 to 1977 engaged at the Landestheater Linz, where she participated on 2 September 1976 in the premiere of Helmut Eder's opera Der Aufstand.

She was from 1977 to 2016 a member of the Oper Frankfurt. In 1978, she performed the part of Sesto in Handel's Giulio Cesare, conducted by Nikolaus Harnoncourt. She appeared as Cherubino in Mozart's Le nozze di Figaro in 1981, alongside Hildegard Heichele as Susanna and Roland Hermann as the Count.

Neubauer appeared from 1981 at the Bayreuth Festival, as a Flower Maiden in Parsifal from 1981 to 1985, and as Siegrune in Die Walküre in 1985 and 1986. She appeared at the Salzburg Festival of 1995 as Annina in Der Rosenkavalier by Richard Strauss. Her roles included Dalila in Samson et Dalila by Saint-Saëns, Marcellina in Le nozze di Figaro, Bostana in Der Barbier von Bagdad by Peter Cornelius, Brigitte in Korngold's Die tote Stadt, and the title role in Fräulein Julie by Antonio Bibalo.

She was in 1979 the alto soloist in a recording by Helmuth Rilling of Bach's cantata Meine Seel erhebt den Herren, BWV 10, alongside Arleen Augér, Aldo Baldin and Wolfgang Schöne. She appears as Emilia in Verdi's Otello in a 1982 live recording conducted by David de Villiers, alongside Spas Wenkoff in the title role.

Neubauer was awarded the title Kammersängerin in 1993. She retired from the stage in 2016.

Margit Neubauer is married to the Austrian opera singer Franz Mayer. The couple joined the Oper Frankfurt together in 1977 and both retired in 2016.
