= NK Međimurje =

Croatian football club

- Full name: Nogometni Klub Međimurje Čakovec
- Nicknames: Crveno-Crni (The Red and Blacks)
- Short name: NK Međimurje
- Founded: 8 June 2003; 23 years ago
- Ground: Stadion SRC Mladost, Čakovec
- Capacity: 8,000
- Chairman: Igor Domjanić
- Manager: Želimir Orehovec
- League: Third League (IV)
Home colours	Away colours

NK Međimurje is a Croatian professional football club based in Čakovec. The club is named after Međimurje, the region in northern Croatia where the city of Čakovec is located.

The club plays their home games at the Stadion SRC Mladost, Čakovec, which has a total capacity of approximately 6,000. The club's supporters' group is known as the Angels.

== History ==
The club was founded in June 2003 and started to compete in the Croatian Second League, where they replaced NK Omladinac, a club based in the Čakovec suburb of Novo Selo Rok. They finished top of the league at the end of the 2003–04 season, clinching promotion to the Croatian First League.

They started their first season in the top flight with three defeats in their opening three matches, before beating Zagreb 1–0 on the road on Day 4 to clinch their first win of the season. However, they continued to experience very little success after that, only grabbing two further wins in the following 18 matches and being bottom of the table as the league split into two groups in March 2005. Their performance improved in the bottom-6 group, the Relegation League, where they had a streak of seven games undefeated and finished in second to last place, overtaking Zadar on the final day of the season.

In their second top-flight season in 2005–06, they once again found themselves bottom of the table in March, although with five wins and only one point fewer than both Inter Zaprešić and Slaven Belupo. After three defeats in their opening three matches in the Relegation League, they managed a streak of seven games undefeated and overtook Inter Zaprešić after beating them on the penultimate day of the season. Međimurje secured their top-flight status after a 4:0 win against Cibalia on the final day, and avoided the relegation play-off because their opponent, NK Belišće, was not licensed.

In 2006–07, they experienced mixed fortunes in their opening seven games, but then managed four consecutive wins and even found themselves in fourth place after the 11th round. They eventually finished the season in 9th place, their best result in the top flight, with 11 wins in 33 matches. The 2007–08 season, however, brought very little success and they found themselves bottom of the table for the majority of the season. They eventually finished rock-bottom, with only 15 points and mere three wins from 33 matches, 18 points behind the 11th-place Inter Zaprešić, and were relegated to the Croatian Second League.

In 2008–09, they finished fifth in the Croatian Second League, but were nevertheless directly promoted back to the Croatian First League for the 2009–10 season as the league was expanded to 16 teams and Slavonac CO, who finished above them, decided to withdraw from the top flight after failing to secure a proper stadium as their home ground.

In the first half of the 2009–10 season, they performed well at home, recording five wins and two draws in nine matches, but poor performance on the road (they lost all eight away matches) saw them start the second half of the season in 13th place, just above the relegation zone. Despite winning two away matches in the second half of the season, a series of draws and defeats (including a crushing 5–1 defeat at home to Rijeka) saw them dropping into the relegation zone with six matches left. A 4–1 defeat at Hajduk Split on the penultimate day of the season confirmed their 15th-place finish and relegation back to the second division. The 4–1 loss was later investigated for match fixing allegations.

In the 2010–2011 season, they finished seventh in the Croatian Second League, they finished strong in the last six games but that was not enough to return to Croatian First League. During the season they had three managers. In Croatian Football Cup they lost to HNK Rijeka in the away match 1:0 in the last 16 round.

The 2011–2012 season was tough for the former first-division club marking their first relegation to third-level football in Croatia. Međimurje employed four managers during the season.

Međimurje then performed well in the third division for a number of years, but were never promoted because the club did not meet the financial criteria for the second division. The seasons 2012-2013 and 2013–2014 marked success in the Croatian Third League North, finishing in 2nd in 2013 and in 1st in 2014. The period of success continued in the next three consecutive seasons. In 2014–2015, 2015–2016, and 2016-2017 they finished third, first and first in Croatian Third League East, led by manager Mario Kovačević.

The club were finally promoted in 2017–18, when they were managed by Matija Kristić.

Season 2018-2019 was first season in Croatian Second League after six seasons in third-level football in Croatia. They started very well, and after six rounds they were in second position behind NK Varaždin. After the sixth round, they were in a battle to avoid relegation and they succeeded in the last round with a win in the home match against NK Zadar.

The 2019–2020 season was cancelled due to the worldwide pandemic of Coronavirus (COVID-19), and before the pandemic started they were in 10th place of 16 teams in the Croatian Second League. The manager at the start of the season was Matija Kristić but he was sacked after the third round, and was succeeded by young manager Damir Lepen-Jurak.

In the 2020–21 season, NK Međimurje signed former player of NK Međimurje Goran Vincetić. The season started excellently, after twelve rounds they were second behind NK Hrvatski Dragovoljac but then Coronavirus cases were found in the team players, so the team was in isolation for two weeks. The team performed poorly in the last four matches with all four lost. Goran Vincetić was sacked mid-season and former manager of NK Međimurje Mario Kovačević was hired. Kovačević started badly with the team so he was also sacked after only five games. Davor Mladina was also hired but he only lasted two games with both losses. In late March Marijan Uršanić stepped down as president and August Jesenović was appointed as the new president. He hired Marko Lozo as the new manager, but he also did not make good results so he was sacked after a 1:6 loss against HNK Hajduk II. The last two fixtures was led by Nikola Goričanec who was the assistant coach to all four managers this season. After a long season, NK Međimurje was relegated to the third division.

In 2021-22 the team had a good start in the Croatian Third League group North, but a bad second half of the season almost meant they lost out on promotion. However, the club qualified for the new third division by defeating NK Hrvatski Vitez 3:0. Even with promotion, the club lost the county cup for the first time in 5 seasons.

== Northern Derby ==
During seasons when they are both in the same league (generally 3. HNL or 2. HNL), Međimurje have contested the Northern Derby with NK Varaždin.

== Personnel ==
Position	Staff
Manager	(Croatia) Antun Jukić
Assistant coach	(Croatia) Velimir Žganec
Goalkeeping coach	(Croatia) Damir Vugrinec
Fitness coach	(Croatia)
Technical director	(Croatia) Hrvoje Goričanec
Doctor	(Croatia) Mario Vinko
Physiotherapist	(Croatia) Mia Milak
Physiotherapist	(Croatia) Mura Janušić
Kit manager	(Croatia)

== Club honours ==
- Croatian Second League
  - Winners (1): 2003–04
- Croatian Third League North
  - Winners (1): 2013–14
  - Runners-up (2): 2012–13
- Croatian Third League East
  - Winners (2): 2015–16, 2016–17
  - Third place (3): 2014–15, 2017–18

== Seasons ==
Season	League									Cup	European competitions	Top goalscorer	
Season	Division	P	W	D	L	F	A	Pts	Pos	Cup	European competitions	Player	Goals
2003–04	2. HNL	32	21	6	5	70	28	69	1st↑	DNQ			
2004–05	1. HNL	32	9	6	17	29	52	33	11th	R2		Ivica Žuljević	12
2005–06	1. HNL	32	9	9	14	40	51	36	11th	R2		Igor Mostarlić	11
2006–07	1. HNL	33	11	4	18	40	60	37	9th	R1		Davor Piškor	10
2007–08	1. HNL	33	3	6	24	37	81	15	12th↓	R1		Edin Šaranović	7
2008–09	2. HNL	30	16	2	12	61	34	50	5th↑	R1		Marijan Vuka	19
2009–10	1. HNL	30	8	5	17	37	61	29	15th↓	R1		Bojan Golubović	13
2010–11	2. HNL	30	12	6	12	53	49	42	7th	R2		Mario Garba	12
2011–12	2. HNL	28	5	7	16	31	60	22	13th↓	PR		David Puclin	5
2012–13	3. HNL North	30	21	4	5	58	21	67	2nd	DNQ		Mustafa Menzil	10
2013–14	3. HNL North	30	20	6	4	90	25	65	1st	R2		Stjepan Kokot	21
2014–15	3. HNL East	30	16	6	8	56	29	54	3rd	R1		Mario Sačer	11
2015–16	3. HNL East	28	20	4	4	60	13	64	1st	DNQ		Toni Petrović	20
2016–17	3. HNL East	30	20	4	6	58	26	64	1st	R1		Nenad Erić	22
2017–18	3. HNL East	30	17	5	8	61	35	56	3rd↑	PR		Filip Škvorc	23
2018–19	2. HNL	26	6	7	13	26	42	25	13th	R1		Mario Munivrana	8
2019–20	2. HNL	19	6	5	8	26	26	23	11th	PR		Stjepan Šimičić	6
2020–21	2. HNL	34	9	7	18	44	85	34	18th↓	DNQ		Stjepan Igrec	10
2021–22	3. HNL North	27	13	3	11	45	47	42	5th↑	PR		Filip Škvorc	15
2022–23	2. NL	30	4	3	23	22	72						
16th↓	PR												
2023–24	3. NL									DNQ			

Key

1st	2nd	↑	↓
Champions	Runners-up	Promoted	Relegated

Top scorer shown in bold when he was also top scorer for the division.

- P = Played
- W = Games won
- D = Games drawn
- L = Games lost
- F = Goals for
- A = Goals against
- Pts = Points
- Pos = Final position
- 1. HNL = Croatian First League
- 2. HNL = Croatian Second League
- 3. HNL = Croatian Third League
- PR = Preliminary round
- R1 = Round 1
- R2 = Round 2
- QF = Quarter-finals
- SF = Semi-finals
- RU = Runners-up
- W = Winners

== Historical list of coaches ==
- (Croatia) Dragutin Naranđa (2003–2004)
- (Croatia) Drago Vabec (2004)
- (Croatia) Miljenko Dovečer (2004–2006)
- (Croatia) Albert Pobor (2006)
- (Croatia) Stanko Mršić (2006–2007)
- (Croatia) Boško Anić (2007)
- (Croatia) Željko Orehovec (a.i.) (2007)
- (Croatia) Miljenko Dovečer (2007–2008)
- (Croatia) Stjepan Čordaš (2008)
- (Croatia) Mario Kovačević (a.i.) (2008)
- (Croatia) Mladen Vuk (2008–2009)
- (Croatia) Mario Čutuk (2009)
- (Croatia) Srećko Bogdan (2009–2010)
- (Croatia) Hrvoje Goričanec (a.i.) (2010)
- (Croatia) Vjeran Simunić (2010)
- (Croatia) Miljenko Dovečer (2010–11)
- (Croatia) Hrvoje Goričanec (a.i.) (2011)
- (Croatia) Dražen Biškup (2011–2014)
- (Croatia) Mario Kovačević (2014–15 Jul 2017)
- (Croatia) Rade Herceg (15 Jul 2017-28 Aug 2017)
- (Croatia) Matija Kristić (2017-1 Sep 2019)
- (Croatia) Damir Lepen Jurak (2019–2020)
- (Croatia) Goran Vincetić (2020)
- (Croatia) Mario Kovačević (30 Dec 2020-9 Mar 2021)
- (Croatia) Davor Mladina (9 Mar 2021-29 Mar 2021)
- (Croatia) Marko Lozo (29 Mar 2021-17 May 2021)
- (Croatia) Nikola Goričanec (17 May 2021-15 Mar 2022)
- (Croatia) Goran Vincetić (15 Mar 2022-Jun 2022)
- (Croatia) Ivica Solomun (27 Jun 2022-2 Sep 2022)
- (Croatia) Zoran Ivančić (2 Sep 2022-21 Sep 2022)
- (Croatia) Davor Vugrinec (a.i.) (21 Sep 2022-28 Sep 2022)
- (Croatia) Igor Budiša (28 Sep 2022-ongoing)

== Youth academy ==
Position	Staff
President of Football School	(Croatia) Bruno Matotek
Vice-president of Football School	(Croatia) Nikola Horvat
Head of Academy	(Croatia) Damir Lepen
Goalkeeping coach	(Croatia) Dean Šafarić
Juniori	(Croatia) Daniel Novak
Kadeti	(Croatia) Neven Bujanić
Pioniri	(Croatia) Karlo Kosalec
Pioniri 2	(Croatia) Velimir Žganec
Mlađi Pioniri 1	(Croatia) Neven Hlišć
Mlađi Pioniri 2	(Croatia) Damir Lepen
Limači 1	(Croatia) Danijel Marčec
Limači 2	(Croatia) Marinko Horvat
Početnici	(Croatia) Kristijan Srpak
Predpočetnici	(Croatia) Luka Ujlaki
Vrtići	(Croatia) Dean Posavec
