= International Days of Music Hesse Main-Taunus Hofheim =

German music festival

The International Days of Music Hesse Main-Taunus Hofheim are an annual cultural event of several days‘ duration in Hofheim am Taunus, Hesse, Germany. It takes place in May or June and is attended by artists from all over the world. The event is patronized by the state of Hesse, the county Main-Taunus and the city of Hofheim am Taunus.

== History ==
The musical event was founded in 1983 by the German violinist and music pedagogue Alois Kottmann as well as the city of Hofheim am Taunus near Frankfurt am Main. The event is based on traditional classical play of violin and piano.

Until the opening of the Iron Curtain the promoters took a lot of effort to initiate and deepen contacts to studying musicians in Eastern Europe. These early years of the event led to a citizen‘s initiative to provide free board and lodging for participators which is still active.

As a result the training course participants were not only able to form a positive and motivating relation with each other but to supporting citizens as well. In addition the level of the artistic niveau increased significantly. The International Days of Music Hesse Main-Taunus Hofheim developed a special flair all related people feel much obliged to.

== Goal ==
The event is targeting to teach the classical play of violin and piano. Two concerts are meant to present this play to the public, an opening concert performed by the teachers and a closing concert performed by the course participants.

The initiators also assigned the task to bring people from many regions of the world together, on an artistic and a social level.

In the context of the event a public symposium is held to annually alternating issues of performance practice, musical education, and musicology.

== Training Courses ==
The daily training courses for violin and piano are open for public. Interested people can watch the performances. There is no age restriction for participants of the courses. At least, they should play on the level of an advanced student. They can also be instrumental teachers or professional musicians.

Head of the violin course is Alois Kottmann, university professor h. c. at Artistic Faculty of Frankfurt University of Music and Performing Arts, university lecturer at Hoch Conservatory and at University of Mainz.

Head of the piano course is university professor Günter Ludwig, one of the most moulded pianists of his generation. Inter alia he was professor for piano at Cologne University of Music and visiting professor at Indiana University Bloomington.

A chamber orchestra is at disposal for the course participants to practice orchestral interplay. The violin and piano concertos of Johann Sebastian Bach and Wolfgang Amadeus Mozart are prioritized. The chamber orchestra Kottmann-Streicher under the direction of Boris Kottmann will perform the closing concert of the International Days of Music Hesse Main-Taunus Hofheim with the course participants.

== Fundraising ==
The development association International Days of Music Hesse Main-Taunus Hofheim bears a major part of the event with personal dedication and financial support. It is based on a fund of late Ottilie Kunz und her late husband university professor Josef Kunz.

== Sponsoring ==
Several sponsors like the Hessian State Ministry of Sciences and Art, a regional bank, the city of Hofheim am Taunus, and companies are supporting the cultural event.

== Alois Kottmann Award ==
During the event the Alois Kottmann Award will be handed over to the best international violinists who are performing in a competition which takes place separately. The award is meant for classical play of the violin in an individual canto-style. The ceremony to grant the award will be performed by the Lord Mayor of Frankfurt am Main, Dr. h. c. Petra Roth.
