= Hofheim, Hesse =

Hofheim am Taunus
- Town
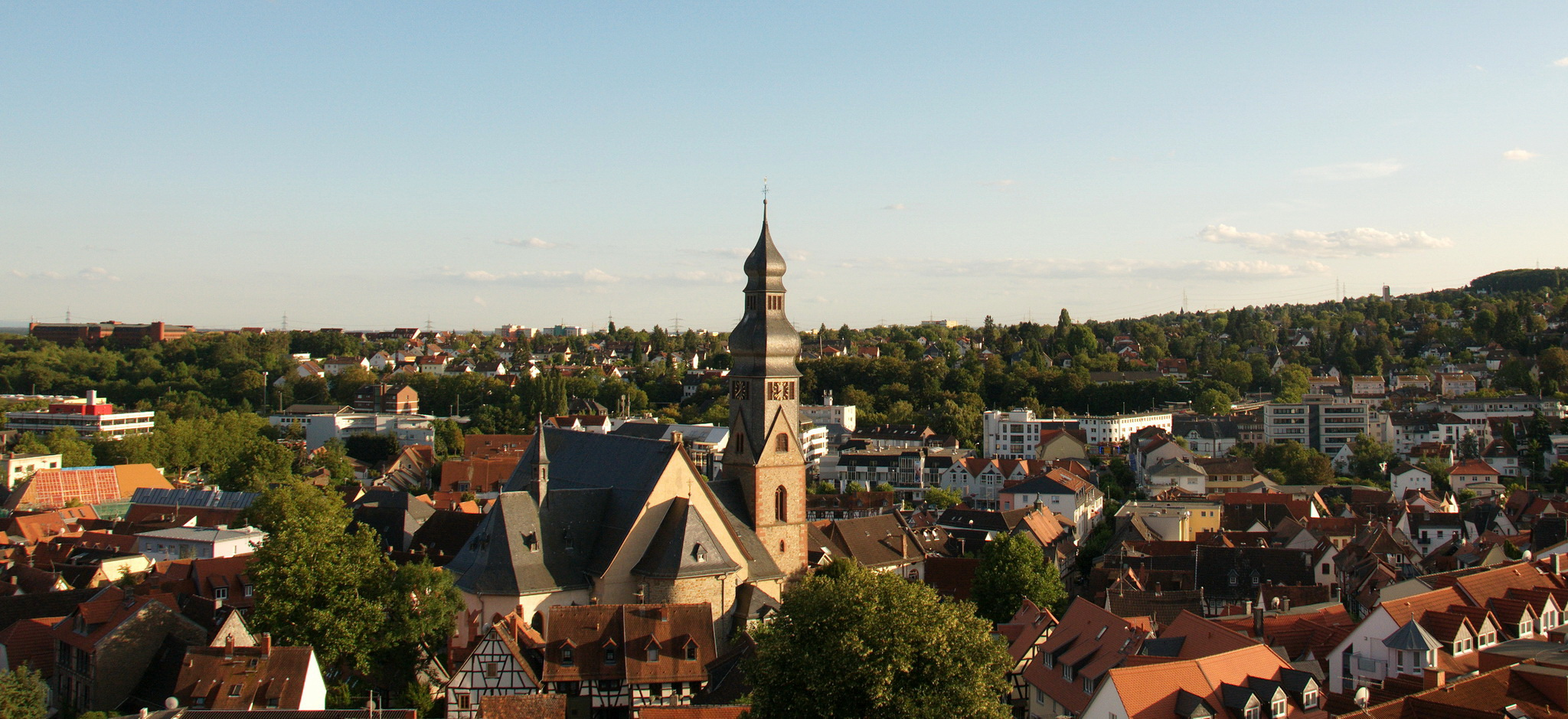
- View of Hofheim

- Coat of arms

- Location of Hofheim am Taunus within Main-Taunus-Kreis district
- Interactive map of Hofheim am Taunus
- Location within Germany Location within Hesse
- Coordinates: 50°05′N 08°27′E
- Country: Germany
- State: Hesse
- Admin. region: Darmstadt
- District: Main-Taunus-Kreis

Government
  - Mayor (2019–25): Christian Vogt (CDU)

Area
  - Total: 57.43 km^{2} (22.17 sq mi)
- Elevation: 136 m (446 ft)

Population (2025-12-31)
  - Total: 39,149
  - Density: 681.7/km^{2} (1,766/sq mi)
- Time zone: UTC+01:00 (CET)
  - Summer (DST): UTC+02:00 (CEST)
- Postal codes: 65719
- Dialling codes: 06192, 06122, 06198
- Vehicle registration: MTK
- Website: www.hofheim.de

Hofheim am Taunus (German pronunciation: [ˈhoːfhaɪm ʔam ˈtaʊnʊs], lit. 'Hofheim on the Taunus'), commonly known as Hofheim, is the administrative centre of the Main-Taunus-Kreis district, in the south of the German state of Hesse. Its population in September 2020 was 39,946.

The town is situated on the south side of the Taunus hills, approximately 17 km west of Frankfurt and 17 km east of both Wiesbaden and Mainz, within the Rhine Main Area, one of the fastest-growing economic regions in Germany. Frankfurt Airport lies 12 km to the southeast.

Human settlement in the area dates back to the Palaeolithic period, and the town was first documented in 1254 under the name Hoveheim. Over the following centuries Hofheim passed through the hands of several noble houses and the Electorate of Mainz before becoming part of the Duchy of Nassau in the early 19th century and subsequently being annexed by Prussia in 1866. On 1 January 1980 Hofheim became the administrative seat of the Main-Taunus-Kreis.

Notable landmarks include the medieval Wasserschloss (water castle), the Kellereigebäude with its historic Hexenturm (Witch Tower), the 15th-century church of St. Peter und Paul, and the European Baháʼí House of Worship, located in the Langenhain district. The town is served by S-Bahn line S2 and has direct motorway access via the A66.

== Geography ==
=== Location ===
The town is located on the south side of the Taunus hills, 17 km west of Frankfurt and 17 km east of both Wiesbaden and Mainz; Frankfurt Airport is 12 km to the southeast.

Hofheim is located in the Rhine Main Area, one of the fastest-growing regions in Germany in terms of population and also in regard to economic productivity. Unemployment is the second lowest in the state of Hesse and one of the lowest in Germany.

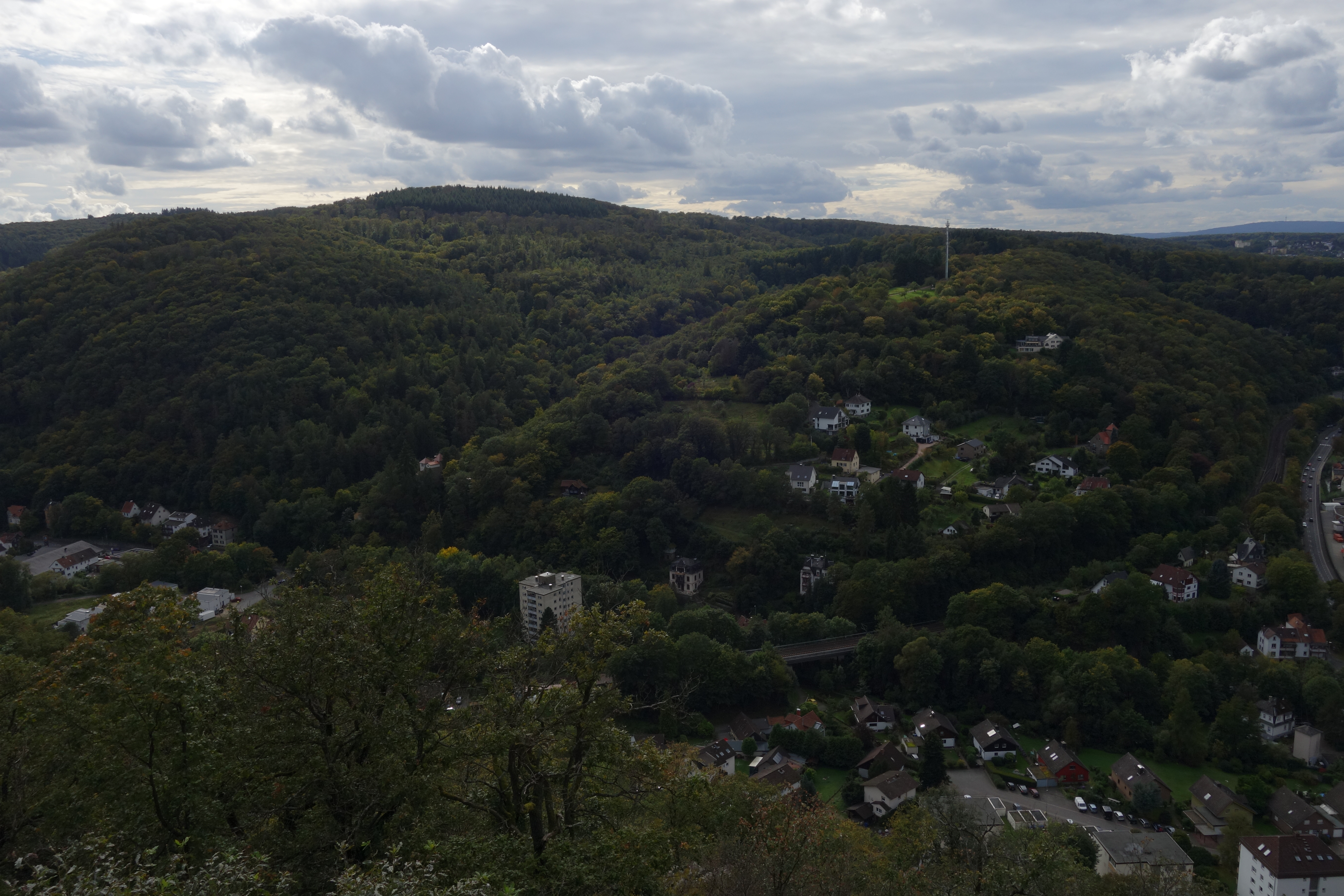
The mountain Judenkopf is the highest point in Hofheim (410 metres).

It is mainly surrounded by forest and open country. The highest point of Hofheim is the mountain Judenkopf in the Lorsbach district, with a height of 410 metres. As well as being the administrative centre of the Main-Taunus-Kreis, Hofheim is its economic hub.

== History ==
=== Early history ===
The oldest traces of human life in the area around Hofheim date back to the Palaeolithic period, with the oldest find dating back to around 40,000 B.C. From the Neolithic period from around 5000 B.C. onwards, settlement areas on the banks of the Schwarzbach, on both sides of today's Schmelzweg and on the Kapellenberg have been identified. Especially the Michelsberg culture around 4400 to 3500 B.C. is shown by numerous traces of settlements and finds on the Kapellenberg (Ringwallanlage). Around 30/40 A.D., the area was settled by the Romans, who built the Hofheim fort here as a two-phase complex - first an earth fort and from 75 A.D. under Emperor Vespasian also a stone fort, which existed until 110 A.D. - in order to secure the Wetterau region, to protect the route between Mainz and Nida in today's Frankfurt-Heddernheim, and to protect the Limes triangle, among other things. The fort was built by the Romans as a two-phase complex.

=== Middle Ages ===
The first documented mention was in 1254 under the name Hoveheim, but the suffix -heim indicates a much earlier Frankish foundation. Hofheim belonged to Count Philipp VI the Elder of Falkenstein, when Emperor Charles IV granted the town a charter. This document gave the lords of Hofheim the right to build walls, gates and bridges, to erect a gallows, to hold court, to conduct crafts and to hold a market. In the imperial war against Philip the Elder of Falkenstein (Falkenstein Feud), the town was conquered by the Electorate of Mainz in 1366, to which it was subject until 1418. This was followed by the rule of the Counts of Eppstein-Königstein until the extinction of the dynasty in 1535. During this time, the first Jews were recorded in Hofheim. Within the 16th century, the owners changed only twice. From 1535 to 1574 the dominion of Eppstein-Königstein belonged to Count Ludwig von Stolberg, who introduced the Reformation in Hofheim in 1540, and from 1574 to 1581 to Christoph von Stolberg. But already in 1559 Elector and Archbishop Daniel Brendel von Homburg had redeemed an old pledge and thus regained Eppstein and Hofheim. After the death of Christoph von Stolberg, the rest of the county of Königstein also went to the Electorate of Mainz in 1581.

Under the reign of Wolfgang von Dalberg, Archbishop and Elector of Mainz, and his successor Johann Adam von Bicken, the witch trials in the Electorate of Mainz reached their peak in the period from 1588 to 1602 in both the Höchst and Hofheim districts. From the remains of old court records, the Aschaffenburg archive remains, 23 women could be identified who were accused of witchcraft, 15 of them found death at the stake. On 3 November 2010 the town council of Hofheim am Taunus decided to rehabilitate the citizens convicted of witchcraft.

Until the beginning of 1603, Protestantism was still the predominant religion among the inhabitants despite the town's affiliation with the Catholic Electorate of Mainz. It was not until June that year that the Protestant pastor was replaced by a Catholic one. During the Thirty Years' War, Spanish, Bavarian, Swedish and French troops occupied, plundered and devastated the town and its present-day districts. Inhabitants were tortured into revealing the hiding places of cattle, horses and household goods. In addition to famine, epidemics broke out again and again, and in 1635 the plague spread through the region. In Hofheim, the number of men (burghers) dropped from 76 and 13 widows to 27 within four years in 1635 (no subdivision into men and widows). Finally, at the end of the Thirty Years' War in 1648, there were 40 men and 4 widows. Children, women and bystanders were not recorded in counts as a matter of principle. From 1665 on, the plague raged in Mainz and Frankfurt as well as in the region of today's Main-Taunus district.

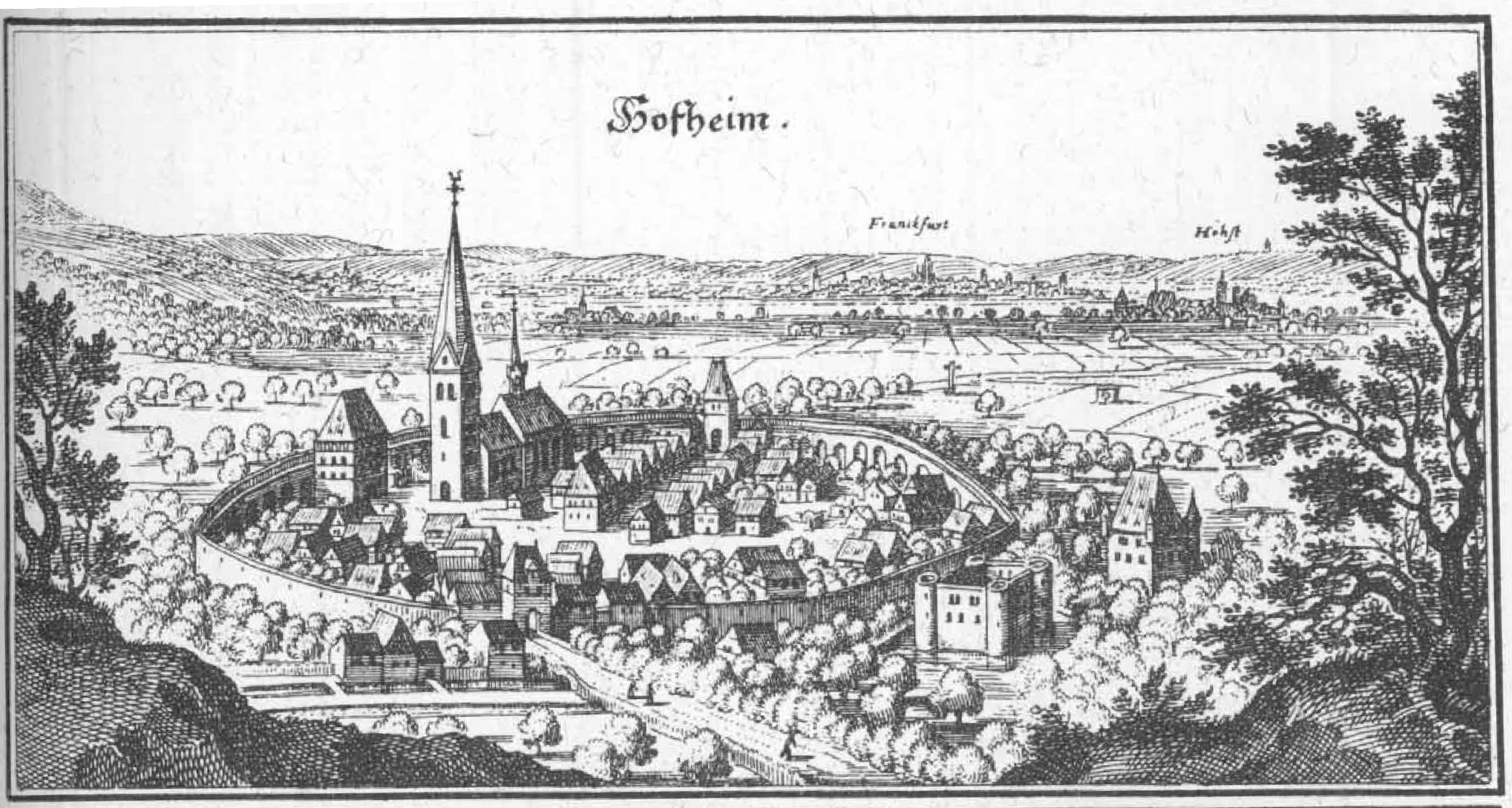
Hofheim in 1655

The following year Hofheim was still free of the plague, and on 3 July 1666 Pastor Gleidener led the inhabitants in a procession to the "Rabberg" (today's Kapellenberg) to take a vow: If the town was spared from the plague, a chapel should be built on this spot in honor of the Blessed Virgin Mary. The chapel was built in 1667 and replaced by a successor building in 1774.

Hofheim is also described in the Topographia Hassiae:

Hoffheim [Hofheim]. a small town; surrounded by walls; located on very fertile soil, a mile from the renowned Höchst; two miles from Franckfurt [Frankfurt]; and also as much from Mäyntz [Mainz]. Has next to the city wall; two small castles; surrounded by good moats, one of which is completely burned; but the other stands vacant. Ten years ago; due to a blacksmith's neglect; the majority of this place was destroyed by fire; as reported on 22 August 1643 from Franckfurt.

With the beginning of the French Revolution in 1789, a 26-year period of peace ended for Hofheim. The population had come to a modest prosperity and had grown to a thousand inhabitants. With the occupation of the city of Mainz by French Revolutionary troops and finally of the city of Frankfurt in 1792, Hofheim residents began years of suffering. Alternating troop marches and quarterings brought looting, famine, and epidemics.

In the Reichsdeputationshauptschluss of 1803, Hofheim fell to the principality of Nassau-Usingen. In 1806, it was united with the principality of Nassau-Weilburg. Together they formed the Duchy of Nassau. In 1866 this was annexed by Prussia and from then on existed as the province of Hesse-Nassau. After Hofheim had long been sidelined in terms of transportation, the town was connected to the railroad network from 1874 to 1877 with the construction of the Main-Lahn Railway between Frankfurt and Limburg. A renewed economic upswing began. Hofheim had also become interesting for Taunus tourists from Frankfurt thanks to the rail connection.

=== 20th and 21st centuries ===
The First World War (1914–1918) resulted in 121 men from Hofheim falling in combat. Numerous inhabitants, especially children, died as a result of malnutrition. After the armistice treaty of 11 November 1918, an occupation of Hofheim by French troops followed as soon as 2 December, and lasted until 1929 (officially until 1930) (Allied occupation of the Rhineland). Hofheim was located within the thirty-kilometer radius around Mainz, which had to be cleared of German soldiers - in accordance with the victors' demands. Within these zones were the cities of Cologne and Koblenz, the area on the right bank of the Rhine, and the city of Kehl (the latter with a smaller radius).

In 1933, the National Socialists took power in Hofheim as well. In the Reichstag election on 5 March, 36.91 percent of the residents in Hofheim voted for the NSDAP. In the municipal elections on 12 March 1933, the NSDAP won 6 of 12 seats. The other seats were held by the SPD (3) and the Center Party (3). On 22 June the SPD was banned, and the Center Party dissolved under massive pressure on 5 July. Thus, the NSDAP was the only remaining party in Hofheim's city parliament and, as of 24 July anyway, by law the only permitted party in the German Reich.

By 11 April 1933 the previous mayors in 13 municipalities in the Main-Taunus district had been replaced by NSDAP members. Since 1920, Oskar Meyrer held the office of mayor in Hofheim and was to keep it until his death on 1 August 1942. After that, the position was not filled again, but continued to be held by the local group leader Georg Kaufmann on a deputy basis.

Discrimination and persecution of Communists, Social Democrats, members of the Confessing Church, and especially Jewish residents began as soon as the Nazis came to power. There had been a Jewish community since the Middle Ages. Around 1800, a synagogue had been established by the members in the former Wehrturm/Büttelturm. In 1933 the community comprised about 35 members. On the night of 9–10 November 1938 (Reichspogromnacht) this synagogue was devastated. Because of the narrow buildings in the old town, the synagogue was not set on fire. A similar fate befell the synagogue in Wallau (since 1977 a district of Hofheim). Only a few inhabitants were able to save themselves by emigrating abroad; the others were deported and were murdered in concentration camps. The almost 500-year-old Jewish community which had numbered around 40~ people since the 19th century was destroyed.

On 1 January 1980 Hofheim im Taunus became the administrative centre of the Main-Taunus-Kreis, although the move was not completed until 1987 with the completion of the new administrative building in Hofheim. The administrative seat was previously in the Frankfurt district of Höchst, which was part of the county as an independent town of Höchst am Main until its incorporation into Frankfurt in 1928.

In 1988, the city of Hofheim was the 28th Hessentag city.

Between 2008 and 2014, 89 stumbling blocks for victims of National Socialism were laid in the town of Hofheim and the districts of Marxheim, Diedenbergen, Wallau and Langenhain by the artist Gunter Demnig.

On 28 April 2025 the main belt asteroid (347020) 2010_{EV} was named 347020 Hofheim, after the town.

== Demographics ==
=== Population as of 2011 ===
According to the 2011 Census, 37,842 people lived in Hofheim am Taunus on 9 May 2011. 6,885 residents were under 18, 15,999 from 18 to 49, 7,602 from 50 to 64 and 7,356 residents were older them 64. Among the residents, 3,414 (9.0%) were foreigners, of whom 1,509 were from other EU countries, 1,073 from other European countries and 830 from other states. Of the German residents, 6.9% had a migration background. (By 2020, the proportion of foreigners had increased to 13.1 %. The inhabitants lived in 1733 households. Of these, 5577 were single households, 5118 couples without children and 4677 couples with children, as well as 1422 single parents and 342 shared flats. Seniors lived in only 3702 households.

=== Population development ===
Early population records show significant fluctuation, particularly during the Thirty Years' War. In 1609, Hofheim counted 71 citizens with 169 children. By 1633 there were 76 citizens and 13 widows, but the number fell sharply to just 27 citizens by 1639. Recovery was gradual: 55 householders were recorded in 1650, 49 citizens and 14 residents in 1656, and 77 householders (of whom 60 were citizens) in 1660. By 1680 the figure had returned to 77 citizens, and by 1712 the town comprised 174 households, including 157 citizens and 17 widows.

Historical population

| Year | Pop. | ±% |
|---|---|---|
| 1724 | 1,060 | — |
| 1781 | 1,050 | −0.9% |
| 1799 | 1,124 | +7.0% |
| 1817 | 1,220 | +8.5% |
| 1830 | 1,541 | +26.3% |
| 1834 | 1,635 | +6.1% |
| 1840 | 1,734 | +6.1% |
| 1846 | 2,008 | +15.8% |
| 1852 | 1,847 | −8.0% |
| 1858 | 1,858 | +0.6% |

| Year | Pop. | ±% |
|---|---|---|
| 1864 | 1,626 | −12.5% |
| 1871 | 1,934 | +18.9% |
| 1875 | 2,097 | +8.4% |
| 1885 | 2,309 | +10.1% |
| 1895 | 2,597 | +12.5% |
| 1905 | 3,350 | +29.0% |
| 1910 | 4,039 | +20.6% |
| 1925 | 4,968 | +23.0% |
| 1939 | 7,562 | +52.2% |
| 1946 | 9,226 | +22.0% |

| Year | Pop. | ±% |
|---|---|---|
| 1950 | 10,179 | +10.3% |
| 1956 | 11,970 | +17.6% |
| 1961 | 14,178 | +18.4% |
| 1967 | 17,519 | +23.6% |
| 1970 | 18,552 | +5.9% |
| 1973 | 30,970 | +66.9% |
| 1975 | 31,238 | +0.9% |
| 1980 | 33,197 | +6.3% |
| 1985 | 33,847 | +2.0% |
| 1990 | 35,277 | +4.2% |

| Year | Pop. | ±% |
|---|---|---|
| 1995 | 36,245 | +2.7% |
| 2000 | 37,441 | +3.3% |
| 2005 | 37,861 | +1.1% |
| 2010 | 38,253 | +1.0% |
| 2011 | 37,842 | −1.1% |
| 2015 | 39,476 | +4.3% |
| 2020 | 39,905 | +1.1% |

== Districts ==
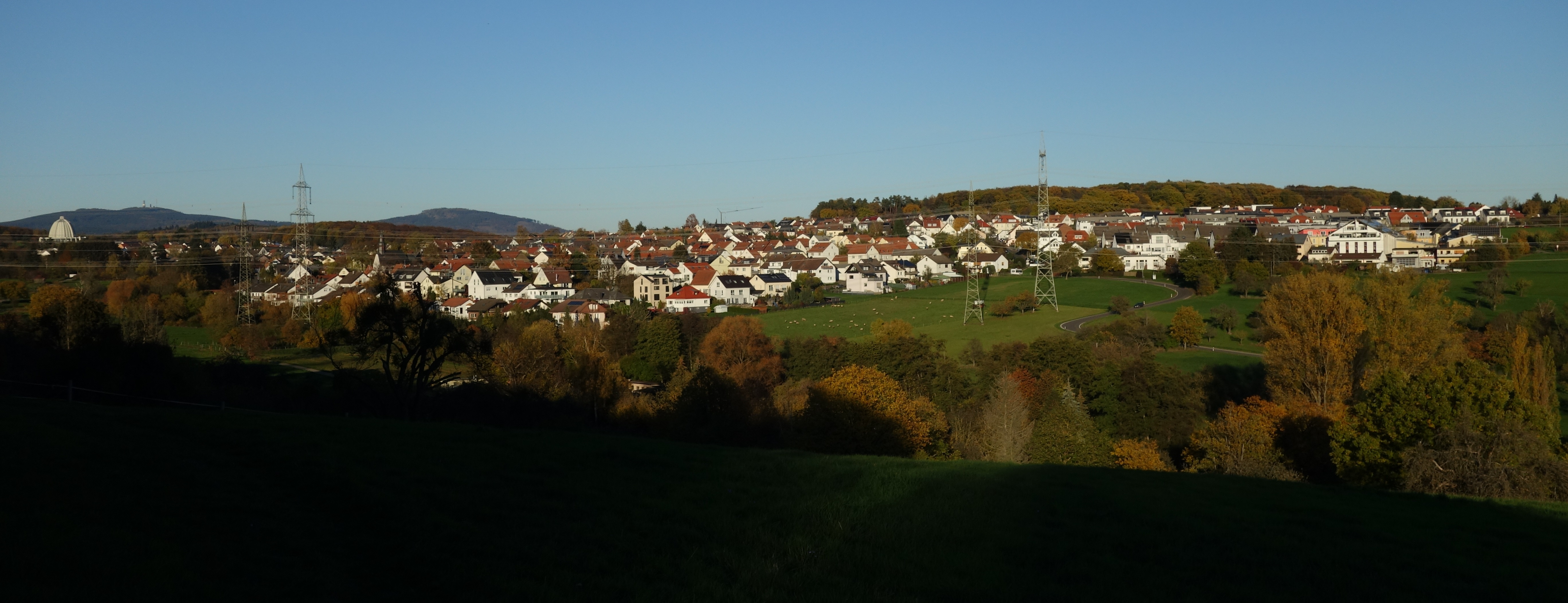
Langenhain district seen from the west

In addition to the town itself, Hofheim includes the villages of Marxheim, Diedenbergen, Lorsbach, Langenhain (where the European Bahá'í House of Worship is located), Wallau and Wildsachsen.

== Politics ==
=== Town council ===
The municipal election held on 14 March 2021 yielded the following results:

| Parties and voter communities | | % 2021 | seats 2021 |
|---|---|---|---|
| CDU | Christian Democratic Union of Germany | 32.93 | 15 |
| Grüne | Alliance 90/The Greens | 23.36 | 11 |
| SPD | Social Democratic Party of Germany | 13.46 | 6 |
| BfH | Citizens for Hofheim | 8.16 | 4 |
| FWG | Free Voters Association | 9.40 | 4 |
| FDP | Free Democratic Party | 6.45 | 3 |
| Linke | The Left | 5.46 | 2 |
| WfM | We for Marxheim | 0.78 | - |

The head of the town council is Andreas Hegeler (CDU).

=== Mayor ===
Christian Vogt (CDU) was elected mayor on 7 April 2019. The next election is scheduled for 16 March 2025.

=== District administration ===
The administrative offices of the Main-Taunus-Kreis (Kreishaus) is located in the town of Hofheim.

=== Coat of Arms ===
Blazon: Divided and split below by blue and red; above in black the growing, golden haloed St. Peter in a silver robe and blue tunic, holding a golden book in his right hand and a golden key in his left; below in front a red armored golden lion between golden shingles, behind a six-spoked silver wheel.

The coat of arms has been officially approved since 1907 and was officially awarded in 1920. It corresponds to older court seals, the oldest of which dates from 1352, after the town charter was granted. As temporary local lords at that time, Mainz is represented with the Mainz wheel and Archbishop Gerlach as count from the House of Nassau with the lion.

== Public transport ==
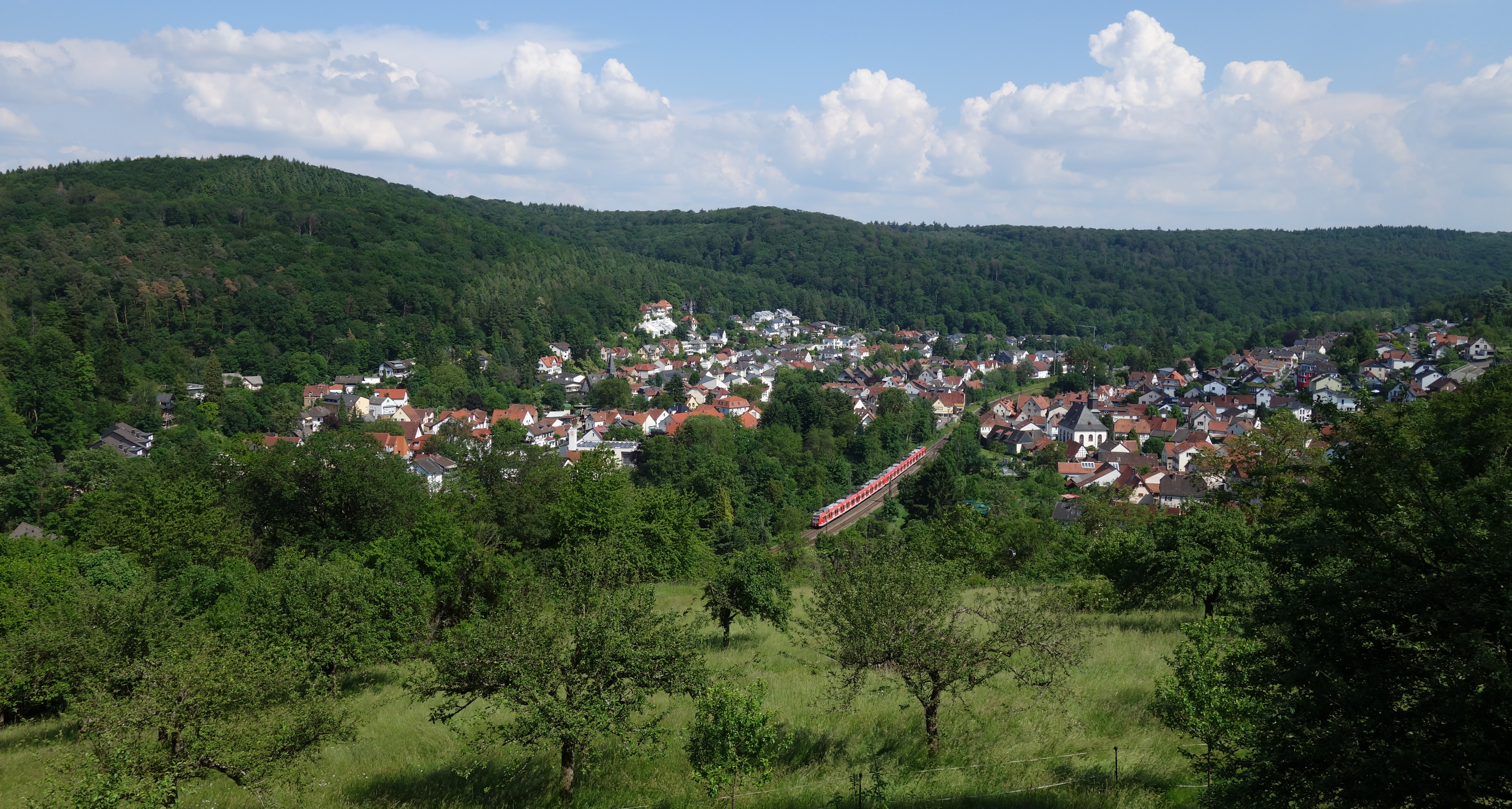
DB class 423 as S2 passing Lorsbach heading for Niedernhausen

The city of Frankfurt is easily accessible by public transportation on trains and S-Bahn line S 2 (stations at Hofheim and Lorsbach on the Main-Lahn Railway) and via the A66 motorway.

Several bus lines run from or via the central bus terminal next to the Hofheim train station to the town's districts and surrounding municipalities, including Bad Homburg and Wiesbaden. Near to the station the headquarters of the Rhine-Main Transport Association (Rhein-Main-Verkehrsverbund; RMV) is located.

== Health care ==
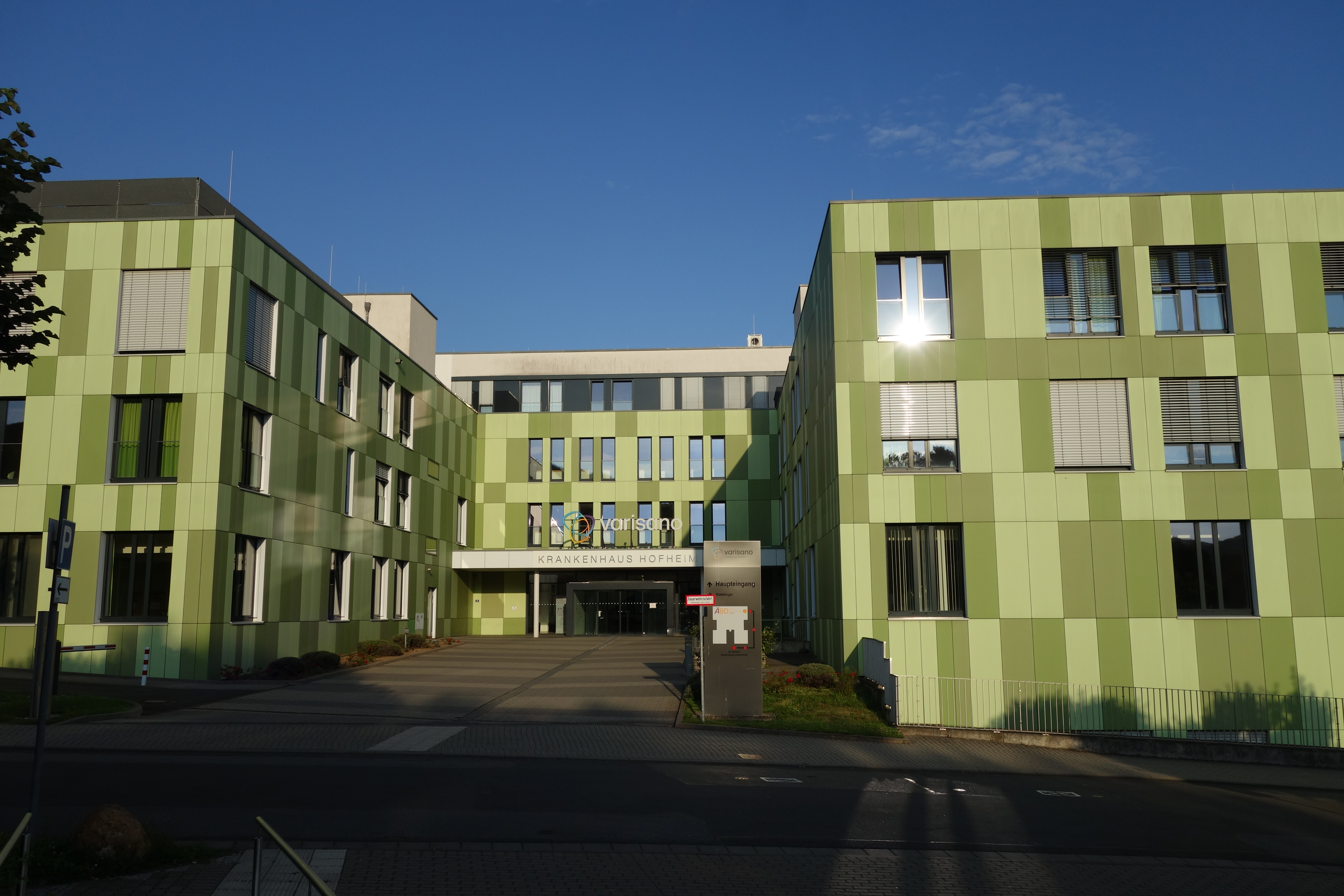
Hofheim hospital

Since 1904 a hospital is located in Hofheim. Nowadays it consists of divisions for internal medicine (with a focus on pulmonology), geriatrics, psychiatry and psychotherapy, sleep medicine and a stroke unit.

== Education ==
There are a number of primary and secondary schools in Hofheim:

- Marxheim Schule (Primary School, Marxheim)
- Lorsbach Schule (primary school, Lorsbach)
- Pestalozzi Schule (Primary School)
- Philipp-Keim-Schule (primary school, Diedenbergen)
- Steinberg Schule (Primary School)
- Taunusblickschule (primary school, Wallau)
- Wilhelm Busch Schule (Primary School, Langenhain)
- Heiligenstockschule (primary school with special needs)
- Montessori Center Hofheim (private elementary school and private integrated comprehensive school with upper secondary level including the Montessori nest for age groups from 11 months to 3 years)
- Gesamtschule Am Rosenberg (cooperative comprehensive school with all-day school)
- Friedrich von Bodelschwingh School (school for special education)
- Elisabethenschule (private secondary school)
- Brühlwiesenschule (vocational school; vocational high school, technical college, vocational school)
- Main-Taunus-Schule (Gymnasium)

In addition, the town of Hofheim has an adult education centre, the Volkshochschule Main-Taunus-Kreis; a library; and a museum.

== Notable sights ==
- The Wasserschloss (water castle) is located in the centre of the town. The castle was built in the 14th century; only the walls survive.
- The Kellereigebäude (Winery Building) from the 18th century is next to the Wasserschloss. It contains the older Hexenturm (Witch Tower).
- The Altes Rathaus (Old Town Hall) stands in the old main street. Having been built in the 16th century, it acquired its contemporary half timbered look by a renovation in 1900.
- St. Peter und Paul church dominates the panorama of the old town. It originated in the 15th century and passed through many changes in its design and accessories.
- The Baháì Haus der Andacht (Bahá’í House of Worship) is the European temple of the Bahá’í community and is known for its special modern design. It is located in Langenhain.
- The town museum displays permanent exhibitions about Hofheim's past as well as changing ones, which are usually related to the region.
- The Bergkapelle (Hill Chapel) looks down on Hofheim from the forest on Kapellenberg (Chapel Hill) in the northwest of the old town. It dates back to the 17th century when it was built to express relief and gratitude for having not been struck by Black Death.

== Sport and leisure ==
Hofheim has numerous pubs and boasts one of the biggest swimming pools (the Rhein-Main Therme) in the Frankfurt metropolitan area. The pool is located at the northern area of the town.

The Rhein-Main Arena is an 6,500 capacity motorcycle speedway and flat track facility between Hofheim and the village of Diedenbergen. The track is home to the speedway team MSC Diedenbergen, who race in the German Team Speedway Championship.

=== Events ===
- The Waeldchestag festival formerly took place annually during the week after Corpus Christi and was a local public holiday with schools being closed. The celebration involved traditional local customs. For political and financial reasons the festival was abolished in 2014 and replaced with a smaller event, the Altstadtfest (old town fair), taking place in the core of the old town.
- The Alois Kottmann Award for classical violin pieces in the canto-style is an international award bestowed following a competition during the International Days of Music Hesse Main-Taunus Hofheim which take place annually in May or June.
- In 1988, the town hosted the 28th Hessentag state festival.

== Twin towns – sister cities ==
Hofheim is twinned with:

- Chinon, France (1967)
- Tiverton, England, United Kingdom (1980)
- Buccino, Italy (1980)
- Pruszcz Gdański, Poland (2012)
