= Sporting CP (table tennis) =

Sporting CP (Table Tennis)
- Sport: Table Tennis
- Founded: 1921
- League: Portuguese Table Tennis League
- Based in: Lisbon, Portugal
- Arena: Multidesportivo Sporting
- Colors
- President: (Portugal) Frederico Varandas
- Head coach: (China) Chen Shi Chao
- Website: sporting.pt

Sporting CP has a professional table tennis team based in Lisbon, Portugal, since 1921, and plays in Portuguese Men's Table Tennis League and Portuguese Women's Table Tennis League.

== Honours ==
=== Domestic Competitions ===
- Portuguese Championship: 43

1946, 1947, 1952, 1955, 1956, 1957, 1961, 1966, 1967, 1970, 1980, 1981, 1985, 1986, 1987, 1988, 1989, 1990, 1991, 1992, 1993, 1994, 1995, 1998, 1999, 2000, 2001, 2003, 2007, 2008, 2009, 2012, 2016, 2017, 2018, 2019, 2020, 2021, 2022, 2023, 2024, 2025, 2026

- Portuguese Cup: 37

1956, 1957, 1958, 1960, 1966, 1967, 1968, 1969, 1978, 1979, 1980, 1981, 1985, 1986, 1987, 1988, 1989, 1990, 1991, 1992, 1993, 1994, 1999, 2003, 2006, 2008, 2011, 2012, 2016, 2017, 2018, 2019, 2020, 2022, 2023, 2024, 2025, 2026

- Portuguese Super Cup: 20

1999, 2000, 2001, 2002, 2003, 2007, 2008, 2011, 2012, 2015, 2016, 2017, 2018, 2019, 2020, 2021, 2022, 2023, 2024, 2025

=== Domestic Competitions ===
- Portuguese Championship: 15

1957, 1958, 1959, 1960, 1963, 1968, 1972, 1973, 1975, 1976, 1977, 1991, 1992, 2019, 2023

- Portuguese Cup: 16

1959, 1960, 1962, 1972, 1974, 1976, 1977, 1978, 1981, 1982, 1988, 1989, 1990, 1991, 1992, 2019

- Portuguese Super Cup: 1

2019

== Technical and managerial staff ==
Name	Nat.	Job
Chen Shi Chao	(China) (Portugal)	Men's and Women's Team Coach
Afonso Vilela	(Portugal)	Coordinator of the training department and assistant coach
Vítor Barbosa	(Portugal)	Assistant coach and Youth Coach
Carlos Ribeirinha	(Portugal)	Assistant coach and Youth Coach

== Current squad ==
Name	Nat.
Quadri Aruna	(Nigeria)
Ricardo Filipe Oliveira	(Portugal)
Bode Abiodun	(Nigeria)
Zhang Yu	(China)
Diogo Chen	(Portugal) (China)
Carlos Ribeirinha	(Portugal)
Lu Renxiang	(Portugal) (China)
Tiago Viegas	(Portugal)
André Silva	(Portugal)
