= Alois Kottmann =

German violinist, music pedagogue, university professor, and patron (1929–2021)

- Born: 20 June 1929; Großauheim, Hanau, Hesse-Nassau, Prussia, Germany
- Died: 4 December 2021 (aged 92)
- Genres: Classical
- Instrument: Violin
- Website: www.alois-kottmann.de

Alois Kottmann (20 June 1929 – 4 December 2021) was a German violinist, music pedagogue, university professor and patron. He was based in Frankfurt, where he founded several ensembles, and taught at both the Hoch Conservatory and the Musikhochschule Frankfurt. He founded concert series in the area, and a prize for young violinists.

== Career ==
Kottmann was raised as one of three children of a silversmith. His mother was interested in music, and supported a musical education of her children. Advised by his music teacher, he took violin lessons with Marie-Louise Graef-Mönch, the assistant of Alma Moodie, who taught him in the tradition of Carl Flesch. Even after graduation he received courses, some in the home of the Hölscher family where he befriended Gert Hölscher (1930–2010) and met the pianist Günter Ludwig. At the Musikhochschule Frankfurt, he studied with Graef-Mönch, his former private teacher.

During a university competition in Hamburg, Kottmann's playing was awarded. After his concert exam, he was first employed as violin teacher at the Odenwaldschule. He then taught at the Hoch Conservatory in Frankfurt from 1958. Later he also taught at the Musikhochschule Frankfurt, the University of Frankfurt, and at the University of Mainz. From 1977 to 1979, he was acting director of the Hoch Conservatory.

"Music is no aid for self-portrayal but instead a medium of communication among people."
– Prof. h. c. Alois Kottmann (translated from German)

Kottmann formed artistic partnerships with Albert Mangelsdorff, Karl Freitag, Agnes Giebel, Peter-Lukas Graf, Ingo Goritzki, Rainer Hoffmann, Alois Ickstadt, Maria Jäger-Jung, Marietta Krutisch, Gisela Sott, and Heinz Teuchert.

He played a violin made by Sanctus Seraphin in Venice in 1730.

== Later life and death ==
Kottmann was especially committed to fight for the continuity of an independent Hoch Conservatory which was under discussion to be merged several times. In later life, he remained involved in supporting musical culture in the Rhine-Main area, of international young talents, of composers from Frankfurt, and the Frankfurt-based violin tradition of Carl Flesch. He was strictly dedicated to humanity and an artistic and social international exchange. Kottmann died on 4 December 2021, at the age of 92.

=== Initiatives ===
- 1968 – Founder of the string ensemble Collegium Instrumentale Alois Kottmann
- 1980 – Co-founder of the Gallus-Konzerte concert series in Flörsheim
- 1983 – Founder of International Days of Music Hesse Main-Taunus Hofheim in Hofheim
- 1987 – Founder of the Philippsruher Schlosskonzerte concert series in Hanau
- 1988 – Founder of the chamber orchestra Kottmann-Streicher
- 2000 – Founder of Paul Hindemith Prize for Art and Humanity of the City of Hanau
- 2001 – Founder and patron of the Alois Kottmann Award for a "singing" way to play violin, in connection with the city of Frankfurt

== Radio & TV ==
In collaboration with the Figuralchor Frankfurt directed by Alois Ickstadt, the Collegium Instrumentale Alois Kottmann, and Kottmann as soloist participated in radio broadcasts for ARD. In 1985, Kottmann was involved in a TV production of ZDF named Passion und Leidenschaft, which also starred Adalbert Kraus and Ernst Gerold Schramm.

== Overseas tour ==
Alois Kottmann gave guest performances with his string ensemble Collegium Instrumentale Alois Kottmann in United Kingdom, the United States, and in Mexico.

== Honours ==
- Honorary professorship of the faculty of the arts of Frankfurt University of Music and Performing Arts
- August Gaul Plaque for Culture and Arts Hanau (1999)
- Frankfurt Plaque of Honour (2000)
- Hessian Order of Merit (2002)
- German Federal Cross of Merit (2006)
- Badge of honor in gold from the city of Hofheim am Taunus (2014)

== Publications ==
- 40 Jahre Collegium Instrumentale Alois Kottmann (in German). Vereinigung der Freunde des Collegium Instrumentale Alois Kottmann. 2008. OCLC 259253726.

== Discography ==
- Johann Sebastian Bach: Konzert a-Moll für Violine, Basso continuo und Streicher, Konzert E-Dur für Violine, Basso continuo und Streicher, Konzert d-Moll für zwei Violinen, Basso continuo und Streicher. Solisten: Alois Kottmann (vl), Boris Kottmann (vl), Basso continuo wird ausgeführt mit Theorbe. Melisma 7210-2, Oestrich-Winkel.
- Albert Mangelsdorff: Denk ich an Bosnien für Posaune und Streicher; Miniaturen für Violine und Posaune; Richard Rudolf Klein: Kontradiktion für Violine, Posaune und Streicher; Paul Hindemith: Sonate Nr. 2 für Violine solo. Solisten: Albert Mangelsdorff (trb), Alois Kottmann (vl), Bruno Suys (kb). Melisma 7239-2, Oestrich-Winkel.
- Joseph Haydn: Die sieben letzten Worte des Erlösers am Kreuz. Mit Zwischentexten von Peter Härtling. Rezitation Karlheinz Böhm. Melisma 7016-2, Oestrich-Winkel. OCLC 725438402
- Georg Friedrich Händel: Der Messias. Ausführende: Sharon Markovich (Sopran). Hildegard Laurich (Alt), Adalbert Kraus (Tenor), Ernst Gerold Schramm (Bass), Figuralchor des Hessischen Rundfunks, Alois Ickstadt (Dirigent). Melisma 6046, Oestrich-Winkel.
- Paul Hindemith: Trauermusik für Violine und Streicher; Richard Rudolf Klein: Canto für Violine und Streicher; Edvard Grieg: Aus Holbergs Zeit op. 40; Edward Elgar: Serenade op. 20; Samuel Barber: Adagio for Strings. Melisma 7098-2, Oestrich-Winkel. OCLC 725750649
- Felix Mendelssohn-Bartholdy: Sinfonien Nr. 12 g-Moll und Nr. 9 c-Moll für Streichorchester. Melisma 7031-2, Oestrich-Winkel.
- Joseph Haydn: Konzert C-Dur für Violine und Streichorchester; Sinfonie Nr. 88 G-Dur Hob. I: 88. Soloist: Alois Kottmann (vl). Melisma 7262, Oestrich-Winkel.
- Joseph Haydn: Die Schöpfung. Oratorium für Soli, Chor und Orchester. Solisten: Dorothea Wirtz (Sopran), Adalbert Kraus (Tenor), Ernst Gerold Schramm (Bass), Figuralchor des Hessischen Rundfunks, Bläser des Frankfurter Opern- und Museumsorchesters, Alois Ickstadt (Dirigent). Melisma 706, Oestrich-Winkel.
- Johann Sebastian Bach: Kantate Herz und Mund und Tat und Leben. BWV 147; Joseph Haydn: Missa in d-Moll in angustiis Hob. XXII:11 (Messe in der Bedrängnis, auch: Nelson-Messe). Ausführende: Ulrike Sonntag (Sopran), Alison Browner (Alt), Adalbert Kraus (Tenor), Ernst Gerold Schramm (Bass), Figuralchor des Hessischen Rundfunks, Alois Ickstadt (Dirigent). Melisma 726, Oestrich-Winkel.
- Johann Sebastian Bach: Johannes-Passion BWV 245. Ausführende: Ulrike Sonntag (Sopran), Alison Browner (Alt), Adalbert Kraus (Tenor), Ernst Gerold Schramm (Bass), Figuralchor des Hessischen Rundfunks, Alois Ickstadt (Dirigent). Melisma 7058, Oestrich-Winkel.
- Johann Sebastian Bach: Messe h-Moll BWV 232. Ausführende: Ulrike Sonntag (Sopran), Alison Browner (Alt), Adalbert Kraus (Tenor), Ernst Gerold Schramm (Bass), Figuralchor des Hessischen Rundfunks, Dirigent: Alois Ickstadt. Melisma 7023-2, Oestrich-Winkel.
- Felix Mendelssohn Bartholdy: Konzert d-Moll für Violine und Streicher; Richard Rudolf Klein: Canto für Violine und Streicher; Johanna Senfter: Konzert für zwei Violinen und Streichorchester c-Moll. Solisten: Alois Kottmann (vl), Boris Kottmann (vl). Melisma 7248-2, Oestrich-Winkel.
- Ernest Bloch: Suite 1; Max Reger: Präludium und Fuge h-Moll op. 117/1; Eugène Ysaÿe: Sonate d-Moll (Ballade) op. 27 Nr. 3; Igor Strawinsky: Élégie; Johann Sebastian Bach: Sonate C-Dur BWV 1005. Soloist: Alois Kottmann (vl). Melisma 7100-2, Oestrich-Winkel. OCLC 725750601
- Wolfgang Amadeus Mozart: Sinfonie A-Dur KV 201. Soloist: Alois Kottmann (vl). Peter Härtling spricht Texte aus Hindemiths Bach-Rede aus dem Jahr 1950. Paul Hindemith: Trauermusik für Violine solo und Streicher; Duette für zwei Violinen. Solisten: Alois Kottmann (vl), Boris Kottmann (vl); Johann Sebastian Bach: Chaconne aus der Partita d-Moll für Violine solo, BWV 1004. Soloist: Alois Kottmann. Melisma 7099-2, Oestrich-Winkel. OCLC 1183686273
- Wolfgang Amadeus Mozart: Missa C-Dur KV 317 Krönungsmesse Regina coeli, KV 127; Felix Mendelssohn-Bartholdy: Herr Gott, du bist unsere Zuflucht / Um unsrer Sünden willen; Joseph Rheinberger: Abendlied, Op. 69/3. Solisten: Ulrike Sonntag (Sopran), Alison Browner (Alt), Adalbert Kraus (Tenor), Ernst Gerold Schramm (Bass), Figuralchor des Hessischen Rundfunks, Alois Ickstadt (Dirigent). Melisma 7035, Oestrich-Winkel.
- Robert Schumann: Sonate a-Moll op. 105; Sonate d-Moll op. 121. Clara Schumann: Romanzen. Solisten: Alois Kottmann (vl), Günter Ludwig (p). Melisma 7101, Oestrich-Winkel. OCLC 725648827
- Johannes Brahms: Sonate Nr. 1 G-Dur op. 78; Sonate Nr. 2 A-Dur op. 100; Sonate Nr. 3 d-Moll op. 108. Solisten: Alois Kottmann (vl), Günter Ludwig (p). Melisma 7102, Oestrich-Winkel. OCLC 1183525901
- César Franck: Sonate A-Dur; Max Reger: Sonate Nr. 2 D-Dur op. 3. Solisten: Alois Kottmann (vl), Günter Ludwig (p). Melisma 7018, Oestrich-Winkel. OCLC 725375326
- Ferruccio Busoni: Sonate Nr. 2 c-Moll op. 36a; Gabriel Fauré: Sonate Nr. 1 A-Dur op. 13; Olivier Messiaen: Thème et variations. Solisten: Alois Kottmann (vl), Günter Ludwig (p). Melisma 7253, Oestrich-Winkel.
- Gallus-Konzerte in der Barockkirche zu Flörsheim am Main. Werke von Wolfgang Amadeus Mozart, Felix Mendelssohn-Bartholdy, Joseph Rheinberger u. a. Opus 27035. Cappella Wiesbaden 1989 OCLC 707182417
- Gallus-Konzerte Flörsheim am Main. Werke von Wolfgang Amadeus Mozart, Dietrich Buxtehude, Felix Mendelssohn-Bartholdy, Johann Sebastian Bach, Joseph Haydn, Joseph Rheinberger u. a. Opus 27042. Cappella Wiesbaden 1990 OCLC 1183519014
- 40 Jahre Collegium Instrumentale Alois Kottmann – Polyphonie. Felix Mendelssohn Bartholdy: Violinkonzert d-Moll; Richard Rudolf Klein: Canto für Violine und Streichorchester; Johanna Senfter: Konzert für 2 Violinen und Streichorchester c-Moll. Solisten: Alois Kottmann (vl), Boris Kottmann (vl). Melisma 6735519, Oestrich-Winkel.
