= List of massacres in Italy =

The following is a list of massacres that have occurred in Italy and its predecessors (numbers may be approximate): they are divided by the presence of culpability or not.

== List parameters ==
A massacre is the killing of a large number of people, especially those who are not involved in any fighting or have no way of defending themselves.

The following are the parameters used to create the list:

- Massacres, accidents or natural disasters that occurred in the actual Italian Republic territory, in the nearby sea, or by Italian ships or airplanes around the world (which are considered part of the Italian territory, by the Italian law);
- Massacres, accidents or natural disasters with at least 3 deaths.

== List of culpable massacres ==
=== Archaic Italy ===
| Name | Date | Location | Deaths | Perpetrators | Notes |
|---|---|---|---|---|---|
| Battle of Selinus | 409 BC | Selinus | 16,000 | Carthaginian Army | 16,000 citizens of Selinus killed in battle and massacre by Carthaginian Army under Hannibal Mago. City razed. |
| Battle of Himera | 409 BC | Himera | 3,000 | Carthaginian Army | 3,000 Greek prisoners of war tortured and sacrificed by Carthaginian Army under Hannibal Mago. City razed. |
| Siege of Akragas | December 406 BC | Akragas | Population of Akragas | Carthaginian Army | Greek population massacred by Carthaginian Army under Himilco |
| Siege of Motya | Summer 398 BC | Motya | Population of Motya | Syracuse | Phoenician population of Motya killed by Greek troops during assault on the city. |

=== Roman Italy ===
| Name | Date | Location | Deaths | Perpetrators | Notes |
|---|---|---|---|---|---|
| Agathocles' coup | 317 BC | Syracuse | 4,000 | Agathocles' army | 4,000 wealthy Syracusans killed by Agathocles |
| Ausona massacre | 314 BC | Ausona | Entire Aurunci people | Republican Roman Army | Entire Aurunci people exterminated by Roman army |
| Gela massacre | 311 BC | Gela | 4,000 | Agathocles' army | 4,000 Geloans slaughtered by Agathocles and their property stolen |
| 1st Cluviae massacre | 311 BC | Cluviae | Roman prisoners of war | Samnites | Roman prisoners of war killed by Samnites |
| 2nd Cluviae massacre | 311 BC | Cluviae | Adult male population | Republican Roman Army | Adult male population of Cluviae put to death by Roman army under consul Gaius Junius Bubulcus Brutus |
| Battle of Torgium | 305 BC | Torgium | 4,000–7,000 | Agathocles' army | 4,000–7,000 troops of Deinocrates slaughtered by Agathocles after their surrender on promises of mercy |
| Aequi massacre | 304 BC | Aequi | Most Aequians | Republican Roman Army | Majority of Aequi people killed by Roman army |
| Messana massacre | 289 BC | Messina | Population of Messana | Mamertines | Population of Messana murdered by mercenary Mamertines |
| Rhegium massacre | 280 BC | Rhegium | Male population of Messana | Campanian mercenaries | Male population of Rhegium massacred by rebellious Campanian mercenaries of Rome |
| Taurasia massacre | November 218 BC | Taurasia | Population of Taurasia | Carthaginian Army | Population of the Taurini capital of Taurasia exterminated by Carthaginian Army under Hannibal after three-day siege. |
| Casilinum massacre | August 216 BC | Casilinum | Pro-Carthaginian population of Casilinum | Republican Roman Army | Pro-Carthaginian population of Casilinum killed by Roman garrison. |
| Leontini massacre | 214 BC | Lentini | 2,000 | Republican Roman Army | 2,000 Roman deserters flogged and beheaded by troops of Marcus Claudius Marcellus. |
| Enna massacre | 213 BC | Enna | Population of Enna | Republican Roman Army | Defenceless crowd massacred by Roman garrison under governor Lucius Pinarius. |
| Battle of Capua | 211 BC | Teanum, Cales | 53 | Republican Roman Army | 53 Capuan aristocrats executed by Roman Army under Quintus Fulvius Flaccus. |
| Agrigentum massacre | 210 BC | Agrigento | Agrigentan elites | Republican Roman Army | Agrigentan elites massacred by Roman army under consul Marcus Valerius Laevinus. Population sold to slavery. Town looted. |
| Tarentum massacre | 209 BC | Tarentum | Population of Tarentum | Republican Roman Army | Population massacred by Roman Army under proconsul Fabius Maximus, 30,000 sold to slavery. |
| Enna massacre | 135 BC | Enna | Population of Enna | Slave rebels | Slaves under Eunus massacre town population and rape women |
| Asculum massacre | 89 BC | Asculum | Majority of the population | Republican Roman Army | Population massacred by Roman Army under consul Pompeius Strabo |
| Rome massacres | 87 BC | Rome | Several hundred | Gaius Marius | Several hundred supporters of Sulla massacred by Marius' rampaging army |
| Sulla's proscriptions | 82 BC | Roman Italy | 4,700 | Sulla | 4,700 enemies of the state murdered on orders of Sulla |
| Appian Way crucifixions | 71 BC | Via Appia | 6,000 | Republican Roman Army | 6,000 slave rebel prisoners crucified by Marcus Licinius Crassus |
| Proscription of 43 BC | 43 BC | Roman Italy | 2,000 | Second Triumvirate | 2,000 enemies of the Second Triumvirate murdered |
| Tiberius' purge | Late 31 | Roman Italy | Supporters of Sejanus | Imperial Roman Army | Sejanus and his supporters killed on orders of Tiberius. |
| Ticinum massacre | 13 August 408 | Ticinum | 7+ | Imperial Roman Army | 7 high-ranking supporters of Stilicho killed by Roman army at the instigation of Olympius. Many civilians in Ticinum killed afterward. |
| Massacre of Goths | Late 408 | Roman Italy | Thousands | Imperial Roman Army | Thousands of Gothic soldiers in the Roman Army and their families killed in anti-Germanic pogrom. |

=== Ostrogothic Italy ===
| Name | Date | Location | Deaths | Perpetrators | Notes |
|---|---|---|---|---|---|
| Siege of Ravenna (490–493) | 5 March 493 | Ravenna | Odoacer and his followers | Ostrogothic Kingdom | Odoacer and his men massacred by Ostrogoths under Theoderic the Great |
| Siege of Naples (536) | November 536 | Naples | Population of Naples | Byzantine army | Naples sacked and the population massacred by Byzantine army under Belisarius |
| Ravenna massacre | 537 | Ravenna | Roman aristocrats | Ostrogothic Kingdom | Roman aristocratic hostages executed on orders of Witiges |
| Milan massacre | March 539 | Mediolanum | All males of Milan | Ostrogothic Kingdom | Male population of Milan slain by Ostrogothic troops after siege. Women enslaved. |
| Ticinum massacre | 539 | Ticinum | Gothic women and children | Merovingian Franks | Gothic women and children sacrificed alive by Franks under Theudebert I |
| Totila's sack of Rome | 550 | Rome | Most inhabitants of Rome | Ostrogothic Kingdom | Population of Rome massacred after siege by Ostrogothic troops under Totila. Women spared. |
| Massacre of aristocratic children | Late 552 | Po Valley | 300 | Ostrogothic Kingdom | 300 Roman aristocratic children killed by Ostrogoths |

=== Medieval Italy ===
| Name | Date | Location | Deaths | Perpetrators | Notes |
|---|---|---|---|---|---|
| Siege of Syracuse (877–878) | 21 May 878 | Syracuse | 4,000 | Aghlabids | 4,000 Syracusans massacred by Aghlabid Muslim army |
| Sack of Taormina | 1 August 902 | Taormina | Population of Taormina | Aghlabids | Taormina burned and population massacred |
| Fatimid sack of Genoa | 16 August 935 | Genoa | Male population | Fatimid navy | Male population of Genoa exterminated by Fatimids, women and children enslaved |
| Siege of Rometta | May 965 | Rometta | Population of Rometta | Kalbids | Population of Rometta massacred, survivors enslaved, city colonized by Muslims. |
| Siege of Crema | 1159 | Crema, Lombardy | 40 | Holy Roman Empire | Imperial army under Frederick Barbarossa executes 40 hostages |
| Palermo massacre | 1161 | Palermo | Muslim population of Palermo | Christian mob | Muslim population of Palermo slaughtered by Christian mob |
| Salerno massacre | Late 1194 | Salerno | Population of Salerno | Holy Roman Empire | Imperial army under Henry VI, Holy Roman Emperor sacks Salerno, massacres and enslaves population |
| Sicilian Vespers | 1282 | Sicily | 3,000 | Ghibelline Sicilians | 3,000 French men and women killed by rebels |
| Lucera massacre | 1300 | Lucera | Muslim population | Kingdom of Naples | Muslim population of Lucera massacred and 9,000 sold to slavery |
| Cesena bloodbath | 1 February 1377 | Cesena | 2,500 | Papal States | 2,500 people massacred by Breton troops under Cardinal Robert of Geneva during the War of the Eight Saints |
| Lozio massacre | 25 December 1410 | Lozio | Nobili family | Federici family | Nobili family exterminated as part of the struggle between the Guelphs and Ghibellines. |
| Massacre of the Trinci | 10 January 1421 | Nocera Umbra | 5 | Pietro di Rasiglia | Pietro di Rasiglia kills most of the Trinci family in a personal vendetta |
| Varano massacre | 10 October 1434 | Camerino | 4 | Rebels | 4 members of the Varano family killed by rebels outside a church in Camerino. |
| Chiavelli massacre | 26 May 1435 | Fabriano | 14 | Rebels | Rebels massacre 14 people, including 5 Chiavellis |
| Massacre of the Assumption | 15 August 1474 | Modica | 360 | Christian mob | Christians kill 360 Jews in Modica's La Giudecca |
| Otranto massacre | 11 August 1480 | Otranto | 6,000 | Ottoman Empire | Ottoman Turks massacre and enslave the population of Otranto |

=== Early Modern Italy ===
| Name | Date | Location | Deaths | Perpetrators | Notes |
|---|---|---|---|---|---|
| Sack of Rapallo | 8 September 1494 | Rapallo | Unknown | Swiss mercenaries | Swiss mercenaries under French command slaughter the population of Rapallo |
| Sack of Mordano | 20 October 1494 | Mordano | 300–1,500 | French Army and Swiss mercenaries | Mordano sacked by French and Swiss troops |
| Sack of Fivizzano | October 1494 | Fivizzano | Unknown | French Army | |
| Sack of Castel Fiorentino | 20 October 1494 | Castel Fiorentino | Unknown | French Army | |
| Sack of Monte Fortino | January 1495 | Montefortino | 300 | French Army | |
| Sack of Monte San Giovanni | February 1495 | Monte San Giovanni Campano | 700–800 | French Army | |
| Sack of Gaeta | June 1495 | Gaeta | 250–900 | French Army | |
| Sack of Toscanella | June 1495 | Toscanella | 800 | French Army | |
| Sack of Ponte di Sacco | July 1496 | Ponsacco | Civilian population | Florentine Army | |
| Sack of Rocca d'Arazzo | August 1499 | Rocca d'Arazzo | Civilian population | French Army | |
| Sack of Annone | August 1499 | Annone | 700 | French Army | |
| Sack of Forlì | January 1500 | Forlì | 450 | French Army and Swiss mercenaries | |
| Sack of Tortona | February 1500 | Tortona | Civilian population | Swiss mercenaries | |
| Sack of Faenza | April 1501 | Faenza | Civilian population | Gascons, Swiss, Italians | |
| Sack of Capua | 25 July 1501 | Capua | 2,000–5,000 | French Army | Capua sacked by French troops |
| Sack of Fossombrone | October 1502 | Fossombrone | Civilian population | Borgia's troops | |
| Sack of Rimini | October 1503 | Rimini | 360 | Borgia's troops | |
| Sack of Treviglio | May 1509 | Treviglio | Civilian population | Venetian Army | |
| Sack of Peschiera | May 1509 | Peschiera | Civilian population and garrison | French Army | |
| Sack of Monselice | August 1509 | Monselice | Civilian population | Army of the Holy Roman Empire; Venetian Army | |
| Sack of Feltre | August 1509 | Feltre | Civilian population | Army of the Holy Roman Empire; Venetian Army | |
| Sack of Legnano | May 1510 | Legnano | 2,000 | French Army | |
| Barbarano massacre | May 1510 | Barbarano Mossano | 700–2,000 | Army of the Holy Roman Empire | |
| Sack of Monselice | July 1510 | Monselice | Civilian population | Spanish Army; Army of the Holy Roman Empire | |
| Sack of Brescia | 18 February 1512 | Brescia | 8,000 | French Army | Brescia sacked by troops of Gaston of Foix, Duke of Nemours |
| Sack of Ravenna | 12 April 1512 | Ravenna | 17,000 | French Army | Ravenna sacked by French troops after the Battle of Ravenna (1512). |
| Sack of Prato | 29 August 1512 | Prato | 4,000–6,000 | Spanish Army | Prato sacked by Spanish troops |
| Sack of Lodi | May 1516 | Lodi | Civilian population | Swiss mercenaries | |
| Sack of Como | December 1521 | Como | Civilian population | Spanish Army | |
| Sack of Genoa | 30–31 May 1522 | Genoa | 5,000 | Spanish Army | Genoa sacked by Spanish troops |
| Sack of Rome (1527) | 6 May 1527 | Rome | 4,000 | Army of the Holy Roman Empire; Spanish Army | Rome sacked by troops of Charles V, Holy Roman Emperor |
| Sack of Pavia (1527) | October 1527 | Pavia | Civilian population | French Army; Venetian Army | |
| Sack of Pavia | May 1528 | Pavia | Civilian population | Army of the Holy Roman Empire; Spanish Army | |
| Sack of Pavia | September 1528 | Pavia | Civilian population | Army of the Holy Roman Empire; Spanish Army | |
| Massacre of Waldensians in Calabria | May/June 1561 | Calabria | 600–6,000 | Roman Inquisition; Spanish Army | 600–6,000 Waldensians killed by Inquisitorial and Spanish forces |
| Valtellina massacre | 18–23 July 1620 | Valtellina | 300–600 | Catholics | 300–600 Protestants killed by pro-Spanish Catholics |
| Piedmontese Easter | April 1655 | Piedmont | 1,712–6,000 | Savoyard Army | Waldensians killed by ducal troops |
| Lauria massacre | 9 August 1806 | Lauria | 1,000 | Grande Armée | City destroyed and population massacred by French Army under Marshal André Masséna |

=== Risorgimento ===
| Name | Date | Location | Deaths | Perpetrators | Notes |
|---|---|---|---|---|---|
| Cesena and Forlì massacres | January 1832 | Papal States | 38 | Papal States | Papal troops suppress liberal rebellion and kill 38. |
| Ten Days of Brescia | 1 April 1849 | Brescia | 16 | Austrian Army | 16 Brescians executed by Austrian Army |
| Cignoli family massacre | 20 May 1859 | Torricella Verzate | 9 | Austrian Army | Austrian troops under Karl von Urban execute 9 civilians. |
| Bronte riots | 2 August 1860 | Bronte | 21 | Red Shirts | 16 people killed in the riots, 5 sentenced to death as rioters by a drumhead court |
| Montefalcione massacre | 9 July 1861 | Montefalcione | 97–150 | Royal Italian Army | Mass shooting of civilians and former Sicilian soldiers. |
| Auletta massacre | 28 July 1861 | Auletta | 45–130 | Bersaglieri; Hungarian Legion | Royal troops attack civilian population of Auletta. 45–130 killed and 200 arrested. |
| Ruvo del Monte massacre | 10 August 1861 | Potenza | 30 | Royal Italian Army; National Guard | Royal Army and National Guard round up civilian population and shoot 30 pro-Bourbon partisans |
| Pontelandolfo and Casalduni massacre | 14 August 1861 | Province of Benevento | 13 | Bersaglieri | Bersaglieri soldiers kill 13 civilians |
| Pietrarsa massacre | 6 August 1863 | Portici | 4 | Bersaglieri | Royal troops kill 4 Officine di Pietrarsa workers and wound 17. |
| Turin Massacre (1864) | 21 September 1864 | Piazza Castello, Turin | 62 (+138 wounded) | Royal Italian Army; Carabinieri | Royal Army and Carabinieri kill unarmed civilians |
| Seven and a Half Days Revolt | 16-22 September 1866 | Palermo | Unknown (tens or hundreds estimated) | Royal Italian Army | Royal Italian Army suppress rebellion mainly against enforced conscription |

=== Kingdom of Italy ===
| Name | Date | Location | Deaths | Perpetrators | Notes |
|---|---|---|---|---|---|
| Caltavuturo massacre | 20 January 1893 | Caltavuturo | 13 (21 wounded) | Royal Italian Army and Carabinieri | 13 Fasci Siciliani protesters shot dead by soldiers and policemen. |
| Giardinello massacre | 10 December 1893 | Giardinello | 11 (12 wounded) | Royal Italian Army | 11 Fasci Siciliani protesters shot dead by soldiers and guards. |
| Lercara Friddi massacre | 25 December 1893 | Lercara Friddi | 7–11 (12 wounded) | Royal Italian Army | 7–11 Fasci Siciliani protesters shot dead by soldiers. |
| Bava Beccaris massacre | 9 May 1898 | Milan | 118–450 (+400-2,000 wounded) | Royal Italian Army | Italian Army troops under General Fiorenzo Bava Beccaris fired on rioters, killing hundreds. |
| Buggerru massacre | 4 September 1904 | Buggerru | 4 (+11 wounded) | Royal Italian Army | Army troops kill 4 protesting miners in Sardinia |
| Itri massacre | 13 July 1911 | Itri | 8 (+60 wounded) | Carabinieri | Carabinieri kill Sardinian workers in mainland Italy because they refused to pay protection to the local mafia |
| Red Week (Italy) | 7 June 1914 | Ancona | 3 | Carabinieri | |
| Bombing of Piazza delle Erbe | 14 November 1915 | Verona | many tens or even one hundred | Austria-Hungary Air Force | During World War I, 3 black-tinted aeroplanes bombed Verona, causing serious damages and killing around one hundred people. |
| Ancona revolt [it] | 25-28 June 1920 | Ancona | 9 | Royal Italian Army | |
| Panicale massacre | 15 July 1920 | Panicale | 6 (+14 wounded) | Carabinieri | Carabinieri suppress farmers' demonstration |
| Palazzo d'Accursio massacre | 21 November 1920 | Bologna | 10 (+58 wounded) | Fascists | Fascist militias kill 10 Italian Socialist Party officials with hand grenades |
| Canneto Sabino massacre | 11 December 1920 | Province of Rieti | 11 (+13 wounded) | Carabinieri | Carabinieri kill 11 protesting workers |
| Castello Estense massacre | 20 December 1920 | Ferrara | 6 | Fascists and socialists | 4 fascists and 2 socialists killed in street fight |
| Empoli massacre | 1 March 1921 | Empoli | 9 (+18 wounded) | Red Guards and Italian Communist Party | Red Guards and Communists kill 9 soldiers |
| Diana hotel massacre | 23 March 1921 | Milan | 21 (+80 wounded) | Anarchists | Anarchists kill 21 in bombing |
| Sarzana massacre | 21 July 1921 | Sarzana | 11 | Carabinieri | Carabinieri kill 11 fascists |
| Roccastrada massacre | 24 July 1921 | Roccastrada | 10 | Fascists | Fascist militants kill 10 civilians in a shooting spree following the accidental death of a fellow squad member |

=== Fascist Italy ===
| Name | Date | Location | Deaths | Perpetrators | Notes |
|---|---|---|---|---|---|
| 1922 Turin massacre | 20 December 1922 | Turin | 11 (10 wounded) | Squadrismo | Fascist Squadrismo under Piero Brandimarte kill 11 communists and trade unionists |
| Librizzi massacre | 25 June 1925 | Messina | 9 (+4 wounded) | Rosario Tranchita | Spree shooting |
| San Giovanni in Fiore massacre | 2 August 1925 | San Giovanni in Fiore | 5 (18 wounded) | Squadrismo | Fascist Squadrismo kill communists, socialists and farmers |
| Victor Emmanuel III of Italy assassination attempt | 12 April 1928 | Milan | 20 (40 wounded) | Unknown | A bomb concealed in a lamppost exploded in Milan, Italy just before 10 a.m, killing 20 people. It was probably an attempt on the life of King Victor Emmanuel III as it went off ten minutes ahead of a royal procession to open the city's fair. |
| Gruaro massacre | March 1933 | Gruaro | 28 | Authorities | 28 children killed by vaccine |

=== Second World War ===
| Name | Date | Location | Deaths | Perpetrators | Notes |
|---|---|---|---|---|---|
| Biscari massacre | 14 July 1943 | Biscari (now Acate) | 71 | United States Army, 180th Infantry Regiment | POWs killed by US troops in two incidents |
| Canicattì massacre | 14 July 1943 | Canicattì | 8 | United States Army | US troops under Colonel McCaffrey fired on looters |
| Castiglione massacre | 12–14 August 1943 | Castiglione di Sicilia | 16 | 1st Fallschirm-Panzer Division Hermann Göring | 1st Fallschirm-Panzer Division Hermann Göring massacres 16 civilians and wounds 20. |
| Barletta massacre | 12 September 1943 | Barletta | 12 killed and 1 wounded | 1st SS Panzer Division Leibstandarte SS Adolf Hitler | Mass killing by German occupation troops under Kurt Grooscke |
| Boves massacre | 19 September 1943 | Boves | 23 killed and 22 wounded | 1st SS Panzer Division Leibstandarte SS Adolf Hitler | Mass killing by German occupation troops under Joachim Peiper |
| Lake Maggiore massacres | September–October 1943 | Lake Maggiore | 56 | 1st SS Panzer Division | Murder of 56 predominantly Italian Jews despite strict German orders not to carry out any violence against civilians |
| Caiazzo massacre | 13 October 1943 | Caiazzo | 22 | 29th Panzergrenadier Regiment | Mass killing by German occupation troops under Lt. Richard Heinz Wolfgang Lehnigk-Emden |
| Ardeatine massacre | 24 March 1944 | Rome | 335 | Schutzstaffel, SD, Gestapo | Mass killing by German occupation troops (SD-Gestapo led by Herbert Kappler) |
| Guardistallo massacre | 19 June 1944 | Guardistallo | 57 | 19th Luftwaffe Field Division | 57 Italian civilians killed in massacre by Luftwaffe Field Division |
| Piazza Tasso massacre | 17 July 1944 | Florence | 5 | Italian fascist militia, German Army | 5 Italian civilians killed in massacre by Fascists and German Army |
| Murder of the family of Robert Einstein | 3 August 1944 | Rignano sull'Arno | 3 | German soldiers | German soldiers arrived at the Robert Einstein residence, a cousin of Nobel Prize Laureate Albert Einstein executed Robert's wife and two daughters, and set the house on fire |
| Sant'Anna di Stazzema massacre | 12 August 1944 | Sant'Anna di Stazzema | 560 | 16th SS Panzergrenadier Division Reichsführer-SS, 36th Brigata Nera | Mass killing by German occupation troops (16th SS Division) and Italian collaborators (16th Brigade) |
| San Terenzo Monti massacre | 17–19 August 1944 | Fivizzano | 159 | 16th SS Panzergrenadier Division | 159 Italian civilians killed by SS soldiers as reprisal for partisan activity |
| Padule di Fucecchio massacre | 23 August 1944 | Padule di Fucecchio, Tuscany | 184 | 26th Panzer Division | Up to 184 Italian civilians as a reprisal for a partisan attack on two German soldiers. Massacre carried out by soldiers of the 26th Panzer Division. |
| Vinca massacre | 24–27 August 1944 | Fivizzano | 162 | 16th SS Panzergrenadier Division | 162 Italian civilians killed by SS soldiers as reprisal for partisan activity |
| Certosa di Farneta massacre | 2 September 1944 | Certosa di Farneta | 44 | 16th SS Panzergrenadier Division | Mass killing by 16th SS Division of 44 civilians at monastery in near Lucca |
| Marzabotto massacre | 29 September 1944 | Marzabotto | 770+ | 16th SS Panzergrenadier Division | Mass killing by German occupation troops (16th SS) |
| Via Maqueda massacre | 19 October 1944 | Palermo | 24 | 139th Infantry Regiment "Bari" | Royal Italian troops massacre protesting civilians, with 24 killed and 158 injured. |
| Bombing of Gorla | 20 October 1944 | Milan | 614 | United States Army Air Forces | USAAF bombers discarded their payload on a densely inhabited area, killing hundreds, including 184 pupils of the Gorla elementary school. |
| Porzûs massacre | 7 February 1945 | Porzûs, Faedis | 17 (1 wounded) | Communist partisans | Communist partisans executed 17 members of the Catholic partisan brigade Brigata Osoppo. |
| Salussola massacre | 9 March 1945 | Salussola | 20 (1 wounded) | Blackshirts | 20 Italian partisans tortured and executed by Fascist Blackshirts |
| Monte di Nese massacre | 13 April 1945 | Monte di Nese, Alzano Lombardo, Bergamo, Lombardy | 120 | Fascists | 120 Soviet soldiers of Azeri origin prisoners escaped Nazi camp to join partisans executed by fascists. |
| Rovetta massacre | 28 April 1945 | Salussola | 43 | Italian partisans | 43 National Republican Guard prisoners executed by partisans from the Brigata Camozzi, Brigate Garibaldi and Brigate Fiamme Verdi. |
| Schio massacre | 6 July 1945 | Schio | 54 | Partisans | A group of ex-partisans of the Garibaldi Partisan Division "Ateo Garemi" and officers of the auxiliary partisan police kill suspected fascists among 99 inmates detained in the city jail. |
| Villarbasse massacre | 20 November 1945 | Villarbasse | 10 | Bandits | 3 of the perpetrators were sentenced to death; this was the last time the death penalty was applied in Italy |

=== Republic of Italy ===
| Name | Date | Location | Deaths | Perpetrators | Notes |
|---|---|---|---|---|---|
| Via Medina massacre | 11 June 1946 | Naples | 9 | Unknown | 9 monarchists killed and hundreds wounded by bomb |
| Vergarola explosion | 18 August 1946 | Pula | 65 | Unknown | 65 killed by detonated explosives |
| Portella della Ginestra massacre | 1 May 1947 | Piana degli Albanesi | 11 (+33 wounded) | Bandits | Attack on May Day celebrations by bandits |
| 1947 Partinico massacre | 22 June 1947 | Partinico | 2 (3 injured ) | Bandits | Attack on Chamber of Labour in Partinico by Bandits |
| Melissa massacre | 29 October 1949 | Calabria | 3 | Police | Police kill three demonstrating peasants. 15 wounded. |
| Modena United Foundries massacre | 9 January 1950 | Modena | 6 | Carabinieri; Police | Authorities kill 6 and injure 200 protesters |
| Trieste revolt | 5–6 November 1953 | Trieste | 6 | Allied Military Government for Occupied Territories; Venezia Giulia Police Force | 6 killed by officers of the Venezia Giulia Police Force |
| Reggio Emilia massacre | 7 July 1960 | Reggio Emilia | 5 | Police | Police shoot and kill five demonstrators. At least 21 injured. |
| Ciaculli massacre | 30 June 1963 | Ciaculli | 7 | Mafia | car bombing of police by Mafia |
| Malga Sasso massacre | 9 September 1966 | Brenner | 3 | South Tyrolean Liberation Committee | 3 policemen killed by South Tyrolean secessionists |
| Cima Vallona massacre | 25 June 1967 | San Nicolò di Comelico | 4 | South Tyrolean Liberation Committee | 4 soldiers killed by South Tyrolean secessionists |
| Viale Lazio massacre | 10 December 1969 | Palermo | 5 | Mafia | Clan warfare by Mafia |
| Piazza Fontana bombing | 12 December 1969 | Milan | 17 (+88 wounded) | Ordine Nuovo | Bombing by right-wing terrorists |
| Gioia Tauro massacre [it] | 22 July 1970 | Gioia Tauro | 6 | Vito Silverini, Vincenzo Caracciolo and Giuseppe Scarcella | Train derailed by explosive. Six killed and 77 wounded. |
| Peteano massacre | 31 May 1972 | Sagrado | 3 | Ordine Nuovo | Three Carabinieri killed in right-wing terrorist bombing |
| Milan police HQ massacre | 17 May 1973 | Milan | 4 | Gianfranco Bertoli | 4 killed and 52 injured in bombing. |
| Argo 16 bombing | 23 November 1973 | Marghera | 4 | Unknown | A C-47 aircraft called the Argo 16 is bombed by unknown terrorists, killing all four people on board. |
| 1973 Rome airport attacks and hijacking | 17 December 1973 | Fiumicino | 34 | Palestinian terrorists | Airport terminal invasion, firebombing and hijacking of two aircraft by Palestinian terrorists |
| Alessandria Prison revolt | 8-9 May 1974 | Alessandria | 7 (15 wounded) | Carabinieri | To quell the revolt that broke out in prison, General Carlo Alberto dalla Chiesa sent the riot squad and ordered it to break in: following the clashes there were 7 deaths and 15 injuries |
| Piazza della Loggia bombing | 28 May 1974 | Brescia | 8 (+>90 wounded) | Ordine Nuovo | Bombing by right-wing terrorists |
| Italicus Express bombing | 4 August 1974 | San Benedetto Val di Sambro | 12 (+48 wounded) | Ordine Nero | Bombing by right-wing terrorists |
| Querceta massacre | 22 October 1975 | Querceta, Seravezza, Lucca, Tuscany | 3 | Massimo Battini and Giuseppe Federigi (Lotta Armata Comunista) | Murder of 3 police Officers by Subversive group Lotta Armata Comunista. |
| Via Caravaggio massacre | 30–31 October 1975 | Naples | 3 | Unknown | Unsolved murder of Santangelo family |
| Graneris case | 13 November 1975 | Via Caduti nei Lager, 9 - Vercelli | 5 | Doretta Graneris Guido Badini Antônio D'Elia | Doretta Graneris and her boyfriend Guido Badini, accompanied by a third person Antonio D'Elia, killed five members of the girl's family with a firearm |
| Acca Larentia killings | 7 January 1978 | Rome | 3 | Unknown | Killing of right-wing activists. Members of militant far-left groups were charged but acquitted, and the culprits were never identified. |
| Kidnapping of Aldo Moro | 16 March 1978 - 9 May 1978 | Rome | 6 | Red Brigades | 5 police officers killed instantly in Via Fani ambush Aldo Moro killed after two months |
| Via Schievano massacre | 8 January 1980 | Milan | 3 | Red Brigades | Red Brigades shoot and kill three police officers |
| Ustica massacre | 27 June 1980 | Tyrrhenian Sea near Ustica | 81 | Unknown | Airplane brought down by a terrorist bomb or air-to-air missile (findings disputed) |
| Bologna Station massacre | 2 August 1980 | Bologna | 85 (+>200 wounded) | Nuclei Armati Rivoluzionari | bombing by right-wing terrorists |
| Circonvallazione massacre | 16 June 1982 | Palermo | 5 | Mafia | |
| Salerno massacre | 26 August 1982 | Salerno | 3 | Red Brigades | One soldier and two policemen killed by Red Brigades terrorists |
| Via Carini massacre | 3 September 1982 | Palermo | 3 | Mafia | Attack on gen. Carlo Alberto dalla Chiesa |
| Via Pipitone massacre [it] | 29 July 1983 | Palermo | 4 | Mafia | Car bombing by Mafia, Rocco Chinnici killed |
| Torre Annunziata massacre | 26 August 1984 | Torre Annunziata | 8 | Mafia | 7 injured |
| Train 904 bombing | 23 December 1984 | San Benedetto Val di Sambro | 17 (+267 wounded) | Mafia | Terrorist attack by Mafia |
| Pizzolungo massacre | 2 April 1985 | Erice | 3 (+5 wounded) | Mafia | Attack on magistrate C Palermo by Mafia |
| Fiumicino massacre | 27 December 1985 | Rome | 16 | Abu Nidal Organization | Attack at Rome's international airport, probably carried out by Abu Nidal Organization, who also struck at Vienna's international airport on the same day |
| 1988 Naples bombing | 14 April 1988 | Naples | 5 (15 injured) | Japanese Red Army | 4 Italians and 1 American killed by Japanese Red Army car bomb. |
| Carretta case | 4 August 1989 | Parma | 3 | Ferdinando Carretta | Ferdinando Carretta kills his parents and younger brother. |
| Pescopagano massacre | 24 April 1990 | Pescopagano | 5 (7 injured) | Camorra | 5 killed in inter-criminal conflict, 7 injured |
| Gela massacre | 27 November 1990 | Gela | 8 (11 injured) | Mafia | Mafia killings |
| Via Gobetti massacre | 23 December 1990 | Via Gobetti, Bologna | 2 (2 injured) | White Uno Gang | The White Uno Gang opened fire on Romani caravans in Via Gobetti, Bologna killing Rodolfo Bellinati and Patrizia Della Santina, and injuring two |
| Pilastro massacre | 4 January 1991 | Pilastro, Bologna | 3 | White Uno Gang | The White Uno Gang opened fire on a patrol group of carabinieri, killing three |
| Sinnai massacre | 8 January 1991 | Sinnai | 3 (1 injured) | Unknown | Until 26 January 2024, Beniamino Zuncheddu was considered guilty, but has been acquitted |
| Capaci bombing | 23 May 1992 | Capaci | 5 | Mafia | Attack on magistrate G Falcone by Mafia |
| Via D'Amelio massacre | 19 July 1992 | Palermo | 6 | Mafia | Attack on magistrate P Borsellino by Mafia |
| Via dei Georgofili massacre | 27 May 1993 | Florence | 5 (+48 wounded) | Mafia | Car bomb by Mafia |
| Via Palestro massacre | 27 July 1993 | Milan | 5 (+12 wounded) | Mafia | Car bombing by Mafia |
| Pegli massacre | 18 March 1994 | Pegli, Genoa | 3 | Domenico Leotta | Murder of 3 womans by Domenico Leotta |
| Chilivani massacre | 16 August 1995 | Ozieri | 3 | Graziano Palmas, Andrea Gusinu | 2 Carabinieri and one bandit killed |
| Ferdinand Gamper serial killings | 8 February 1996 - 1° March 1996 | South Tyrol | 6 | Ferdinand Gamper | Also known as "The monster of Merano" |
| Buonvicino massacre [it] | 19 November 1996 | Buonvicino, Calabria | 6 | Alfredo Valente | The police officer Alfredo Valente shot and killed six members of his ex-wife's family with a pistol. He was arrested at another location. |
| Erba Massacre [it] | 11 December 2006 | Erba, Lombardy | 4 | Couple Olindo Romano and Angela Rosa Bazzi | The Couple Olindo Romano and Angela Rosa Bazzi Kills Four people including a 2-Year old Baby |
| Castel Volturno massacre | 18 September 2008 | Castel Volturno | 7 (+1 injured) | Casalesi clan | Seven people, including six African immigrants killed at random by the Casalesi clan. |
| 2011 Florence shootings | 13 December 2011 | Florence, Tuscany | 3 (including the perpetrator + 3 injured) | Gianluca Casseri | A member of CasaPound Gianluca Casseri opened fire in a suburb market where many Senegalese immigrants were selling goods before committing suicide |
| Sant'Anna prison riot | 8-9 March 2020 | Sant'Anna prison, Modena | 9 | Prisoners | Prisoners revolt over measures to contain COVID-19 |
| Ardea shooting | 13 June 2021 | Viale Corona Boreale, Colle Romito, Ardea, Lazio | 4 (including the perpetrator) | Andrea Pignani | Andrea Pignani open fire against passersby at a park, killing two children and an elderly man, before committing suicide |
| Samarate massacre | 4 May 2022 | Samarate, Varese, Lombardy | 3 | Alessandro Maja | Alessandro Maja attacked his family with a fire killing his wife and daughter. His son survived but was disabled with severe injuries. |

== List of non-culpable massacres and natural disasters ==
=== Roman Italy ===
| Name | Date | Location | Deaths | Notes |
|---|---|---|---|---|
| Fidenae amphitheater disaster | 27 AD | Fidenae | 20,000+ | |
| Eruption of Vesuvius | 24 October 79 AD | Naples | 1,500-3,500 | possibly up to 16,000 deaths. One of the deadliest eruption in European history. Ejecting molten rock, pulverized pumice and hot ash at 1.5 million tons per second, ultimately releasing 100,000 times the thermal energy of the atomic bombings of Hiroshima and Nagasaki. |
| Circus Maximus partial collapse | 140 AD | Rome | 1,112 | Collapse of the upper tier of the Circus Maximus. |
| Circus Maximus partial collapse | 284 or 286 AD | Rome | 13,000 | Collapse of a wall of Circus Maximus. |

=== Medieval Italy ===
| Name | Date | Location | Deaths | Notes |
|---|---|---|---|---|
| 1169 Sicily earthquake | 4 February 1169 | Ionian Sea, near Catania | 15,000-25,000 | Nearly all Catania people killed. Caused tsunami. |
| 1222 Brescia earthquake | 25 December 1222 | Capriano del Colle | 10,000+ | |
| 1348 Friuli earthquake | 25 January 1348 | Tolmezzo, Venzone and Gemona del Friuli | 10,000 | The earthquake hit in the same year that the Great Plague ravaged Italy. |
| 1456 Central Italy earthquakes | 5 December 1456 | Pontelandolfo | 30,000-70,000 | Largest earthquake on the Italian Peninsula. |

=== Modern Italy ===
| Name | Date | Location | Deaths | Notes |
|---|---|---|---|---|
| 1627 Gargano earthquake | 30 July 1627 | San Severo | 5,000 | The largest and deadliest seismic event ever recorded in the Apulia region. Caused tsunami. |
| 1638 Calabrian earthquakes | 27 March 1638 | Near Savuto river | 9,581-30,000 | |
| 1693 Sicily earthquake | 11 January 1693 | Near Catania | 60,000 | Almost two-thirds of the entire population of Catania were killed. The main quake had an estimated magnitude of 7.4 on the moment magnitude scale, the most powerful in Italian recorded history |
| 1703 Apennine earthquakes | 14 January 1703 | Norcia, Montereale, L'Aquila | 10,000+ | |
| Brescia explosion | 18 August 1769 | Brescia | 3,000 | A Lightning bolt caused the explosion of a gunpowder depot, destroying one-sixth of the city. |
| 1783 Calabrian earthquakes | 4 February 1783 | Palmi, Calabria | 32,000-50,000 | The earthquakes occurred over a period of nearly two months. Caused tsunami. |
| 1805 Molise earthquake | 26 July 1805 | Bojano-Macchiagodena | 5,573 | |
| 1857 Basilicata earthquake | 16 December 1857 | Montemurro | 10,000 | At the time it was the third-largest known earthquake. |
| Limito rail disaster [it] | 28 November 1893 | Pioltello | 40 | |
| Repression of the Fasci Siciliani | 10 December 1893 - 5 January 1894 | Sicily | 145 | |

=== XX and XXI centuries ===
| Name | Date | Location | Deaths | Notes |
|---|---|---|---|---|
| 1905 Calabria earthquake | 8 September 1905 | Epicenter near Vibo Valentia | 557-2,500 | Caused a tsunami. |
| SS Sirio sinking | 4 August 1906 | Near Cape Palos, Cartagena, Spain. (**) | 295-500 | The shipwreck gained notoriety because the captain, Giuseppe Piccone, abandoned ship at the first opportunity. |
| 1907 Calabria earthquake | 23 October 1907 | Ferruzzano | 167 | |
| 1908 Messina earthquake | 28 December 1908 | Strait of Messina | 75,000 - 82,000 | One of the worst earthquakes in the 20th century. Caused a tsunami. |
| 1915 Avezzano earthquake | 13 January 1915 | Avezzano | 29,978 - 32,610 | |
| 1919 Verona Caproni Ca.48 crash | 2 August 1919 | Verona | 14/15/17 (sources vary) | |
| 1920 Garfagnana earthquake | 7 September 1920 | Garfagnana | 171 | |
| Gleno Dam failure | 1 December 1923 | Bergamo | 356 | |
| SS Principessa Mafalda sinking | 25 October 1927 | near the Abrolhos Archipelago, 80 miles off Salvador de Bahia, Brazil (**) | 314 | The sinking resulted in the greatest loss of life in Italian shipping and the largest ever in the Southern Hemisphere in peacetime, with the ship that was called "the Italian Titanic" |
| Emilio Materassi's car crash at 1928 Italian Grand Prix | 9 September 1928 | Monza Circuit, Monza | 28 | Emilio Materassi and 27 spectators were killed when Materassi's car crashed into a grandstand; worst accident after the 1955 Le Mans disaster. |
| 1930 Irpinia earthquake | 23 July 1930 | Aquilonia, Campania | 1404 | |
| "Black day of Monza" [it] | 10 September 1933 | Monza Circuit, Monza | 3 | During the 1933 Grand Prix of Monza, Giuseppe Campari, Baconin Borzacchini and Stanisław Czaykowski died in accident. |
| Molare dam disaster [it] | 13 August 1935 | Molare | 111 | |
| Colleferro explosion [it] | 29 January 1938 | Colleferro | 60 | |
| SS Orazio sinking [it] | 21 January 1940 | 35 miles off Toulon, France. (**) | 108 | (See List of maritime disasters in the 20th century for further details.) |
| Galleria delle Grazie human stampede [it] | 23 October 1942 | Genoa | 354 | People were killed by stampede during an attack by the RAF Bomber Command in WWII as they made their way into Galleria delle Grazie, a railway tunnel in use as an air-raid shelter. Rushing down the 150 steps leading underground into the shelter, people fell on top of one another in a crush, accounting for the extremely heavy toll of the stampede. |
| Caterina Costa explosion | 28 March 1943 | Naples | 600+ | |
| Balvano train disaster | 3 March 1944 | Balvano | 517+ | The deadliest railway accident in Italian history. |
| SS Charles Henderson explosion | 9 April 1945 | Bari | 542 | |
| Superga air disaster | 4 May 1949 | Turin | 31 | |
| 1951 Polesine flood [it] | 14 November 1951 | Province of Rovigo | 101 (over 180,000 homeless) | Heavy social and economic consequences |
| Sinnai flight crash [it] | 26 January 1953 | Sinnai | 19 | |
| BOAC Flight 781 crash | 10 January 1954 | Near Elba island | 35 | |
| South African Airways Flight 201 crash | 8 April 1954 | Mediterranean Sea between Naples and Stromboli | 21 | |
| 1954 Ribolla disaster | 4 May 1954 | Ribolla | 43 | |
| Sabena Flight 503 crash | 13 February 1955 | Monte Terminillo, Rieti | 29 | |
| SS Andrea Doria sinking | 25 July 1956 | Near the coast of Nantucket, Massachusetts (**) | 46 | |
| 1957 Mille Miglia accident | 12 May 1957 | Guidizzolo (near Mantua) | 13 | Driver Alfonso de Portago, his co-driver/navigator, Ed Nelson and nine spectators was killed when Portago and Nelson ploughed into spectators. The Italian government decreed the end of the Mille Miglia race. |
| British European Airways Flight 142 collision | 22 October 1958 | Nettuno, near Anzio | 31 | |
| Wolfgang von Trips's car crash at 1961 Italian Grand Prix | 10 September 1961 | Monza | 15 | Wolfgang Von Trips and 14 spectators were killed when Von Trips' car was thrown amidst the audience |
| 1962 Irpinia earthquake | 21 August 1962 | Irpinia | 16 | |
| Enrico Mattei air disaster | 27 October 1962 | Bascapè, near Pavia | 3 | Enrico Mattei killed together with 2 friends |
| Vajont disaster | 9 October 1963 | Vajont | 1,917 (and 1,300 definitively missing) | |
| 1966 flood of the Arno and 1966 Venice flood | 4 November 1966 | Florence, Grosseto, Pisa, Pontedera, Venice | 101 in Tuscany, 1 in Venice | Worst serie of floods in centuries and worst flood in the Florence's history since 1557. |
| 1968 Belice earthquake | 14 January 1968 | Western Sicily | 231+ | New towns constructed |
| Sinking of the SS London Valour | 9 April 1970 | Genoa | 20 | |
| F4 Tornado on Venice | 11 September 1970 | Venice | 36 | An F4 Tornado (Fujita scale) hit Venice and sunk a ship (21 deaths on it alone). |
| SS Heleanna fire [it] | 28 August 1971 | Off Torre Canne | 41 | . |
| 1971 RAF Hercules crash | 9 November 1971 | Off the coast of Livorno by Meloria shoal | 52 | Worst Italian Army accident since WWII |
| Alitalia Flight 112 crash | 5 May 1972 | near Palermo | 115 | |
| 1976 Cavalese cable car crash | 9 March 1976 | Cavalese | 43 | |
| 1976 Friuli earthquake | 6 May 1976 | Gemona del Friuli | 990 (and over 3,000 injured) | Famous for its fast recover |
| Mount Serra Air disaster [it] | 3 March 1977 | Calci | 44 | |
| Alitalia Flight 4128 crash | 23 December 1978 | Tyrrhenian Sea, off Palermo | 108 | |
| Serafino Ferruzzi's personal jet disaster [it] | 10 December 1979 | Forlì | 5 | Serafino Ferruzzi died together with 4 other people |
| 1980 Irpinia earthquake | 13 November 1980 | Castelnuovo di Conza and Campania | 2,483 - 4,900 | Famous for its slow and corrupted rebuild period |
| Vignola palace fire [it] | 25 April 1982 | Todi | 35 (+40 injured) | |
| Champoluc cable car crash [it] | 13 February 1983 | Champoluc | 11 | A man, Maurizio Maria Verna (a 29 years old turinese) survived, by not using the cable car, and then died hours later in the Cinema Statuto Fire, in Turin. |
| Cinema Statuto fire | 13 February 1983 | Turin | 64 | Largest disaster after World War II in Turin. The accident prompted a wave of reforms in the laws about public buildings, making fireproof materials and firefighting equipment mandatory for every public space. |
| Nervi highway disaster [it] | 18 December 1983 | Genoa | 35 | |
| Val di Stava dam collapse | 19 July 1985 | Tesero | 268 | |
| Giorgio Aiazzone's personal aircraft disaster [it] | 6 July 1986 | Sartirana Lomellina, near Pavia | 3 | Giorgio Aiazzone was an Italian entrepreneur that was becoming very famous in the mid-1980s. The Piper PA-34 Seneca he rented was destroyed by a tempest, killing the pilot and a friend. |
| Elisabetta Montanari explosion [it] | 13 March 1987 | Port of Ravenna, Ravenna | 13 | |
| Valtellina disaster | 28 July 1987 | Valtellina | 53 | |
| Aero Trasporti Italiani Flight 460 crash | 15 October 1987 | Mount Crozza, Conca di Crezzo, Province of Como | 37 | |
| Uganda Airlines Flight 775 crash | 17 October 1988 | Rome-Fiumicino Airport, Rome | 33 | |
| Collapse of the Civic Tower of Pavia | 17 March 1989 | Pavia | 4 | |
| Crotone rail disaster [it] | 16 November 1989 | Crotone | 12 | |
| 1990 Carlentini earthquake | 13 December 1990 | Near Augusta, Sicily | 19 | |
| Moby Prince disaster | 10 April 1991 | Livorno | 140 | |
| Banat Air Flight 166 crash | 13 December 1995 | Sommacampagna near Verona Airport, Verona | 49 | |
| 1997 Umbria and Marche earthquake | 26 September 1996 | Annifo and Umbria-Marche territory | 11 | There were several thousands of foreshocks and aftershocks from May 1997 to April 1998. |
| Sinking of F174 | 25-26 December 1996 | 35 km off-shore of Portopalo di Capo Passero | 283 (+27 lost) | |
| Pendolino massacre [it] | 12 January 1997 | Near Piacenza | 8 | Former Italian president Francesco Cossiga was on the train and didn't die or get injured due to pure luck, being in the restaurant wagon and not in the first one, where his seat was allocated. |
| 1998 Cavalese cable car crash | 3 February 1998 | Cavalese | 20 | Caused by a human error of a USAF pilot |
| Via Vigna Jacobini building collapse [it] | 16 December 1998 | Rome | 27 | |
| Via Ventotene gas explosion [it] | 27 November 2001 | Rome | 8 | |
| 2002 Pirelli Tower airplane crash | 18 April 2002 | Milan | 3 (and 60 injured) | Cause not clear; officially a suicide of the pilot. |
| 2002 Molise earthquakes | 31 October 2002 | San Giuliano di Puglia | 29 | Most deaths caused by the collapse of a school in San Giuliano di Puglia. |
| City-Jet 124 flight crash [it] | 24 February 2004 | Sinnai | 6 | |
| Crevalcore train crash | January 2005 | Crevalcore | 17 (and 80 injured) | Two consecutive human errors |
| 2009 L'Aquila earthquake | 6 April 2009 | L'Aquila | 308 (and over 1500 injured) | |
| 2009 Italian Air Force C130 disaster [it] | 24 November 2009 | Pisa | 5 | |
| Costa Concordia disaster | 13 January 2012 | Isola del Giglio | 34 | |
| 2012 Emilia earthquake | 20-29 May 2012 | Finale Emilia | 27 | |
| Collision of Jolly Nero and the control tower of Genoea harbour [it] | 7 May 2013 | Genoa | 9 (and 6 injured) | The ship Jolly Nero collided with the control tower of the port of Genoa, making it collapse and nearly killing all the people inside it. |
| 2013 Monteforte Irpino bus crash | 28 July 2013 | near Neaples | 40 | |
| 2013 Lampedusa migrant shipwreck | 3 October 2013 | Near Lampedusa island | 359+ | |
| Cargo Gökbel sinking [it] | 28 December 2014 | Near Marina di Ravenna (Ravenna) shore | 6 | |
| MS Norman Atlantic fire [it] | 28 December 2014 | Strait of Otranto | 11 | |
| August 2016 Central Italy earthquake | 24 August 2016 | Accumoli, Amatrice | 299 | (Link to the italian wiki page: ) |
| January 2017 Central Italy earthquakes and Rigopiano avalanche | 18 January 2017 | Farindola | 34 | Rigopiano avalanche caused 29 deaths alone. |
| 2017 Turin stampede | 2 June 2017 | Turin | 3 | More than 1,500 injured |
| Pioltello train derailment | 25 January 2018 | Pioltello | 3 (and 46 injured) | |
| Collapse of the Morandi Bridge | 14 August 2018 | Genoa | 43 (and 16 injured) | |
| Corinaldo stampede | 8 December 2018 | Corinaldo | 6 | |
| Stresa–Mottarone cable car crash | 23 May 2021 | Mottarone | 14 | |
| 2022 Marmolada serac collapse | 3 July 2022 | Marmolada | 11 | |
| 2023 Calabria migrant boat disaster | 26 February 2023 | off the coast of Calabria | 94 | The boat was carrying more than 200 migrants when it sank; 81 people survived. |

(**) For the Italian law, all the Italian ships are considered Italian territory.

== See also ==
- List of accidents and disasters by death toll
- List of lists organized by death toll
- List of maritime disasters in the 20th century
- List of accidents and incidents involving airliners by location
- Terrorism in Italy

=== For Italians massacred outside Italy ===
- Anti-Italianism
- Anti-Catholicism in the United States (and Know Nothing movement)
- Italian Military Internees
- Foibe massacres
- Massacre of Italians at Aigues-Mortes
- March 14, 1891 New Orleans lynchings
- Sacco and Vanzetti
