= Terrorism in Italy =

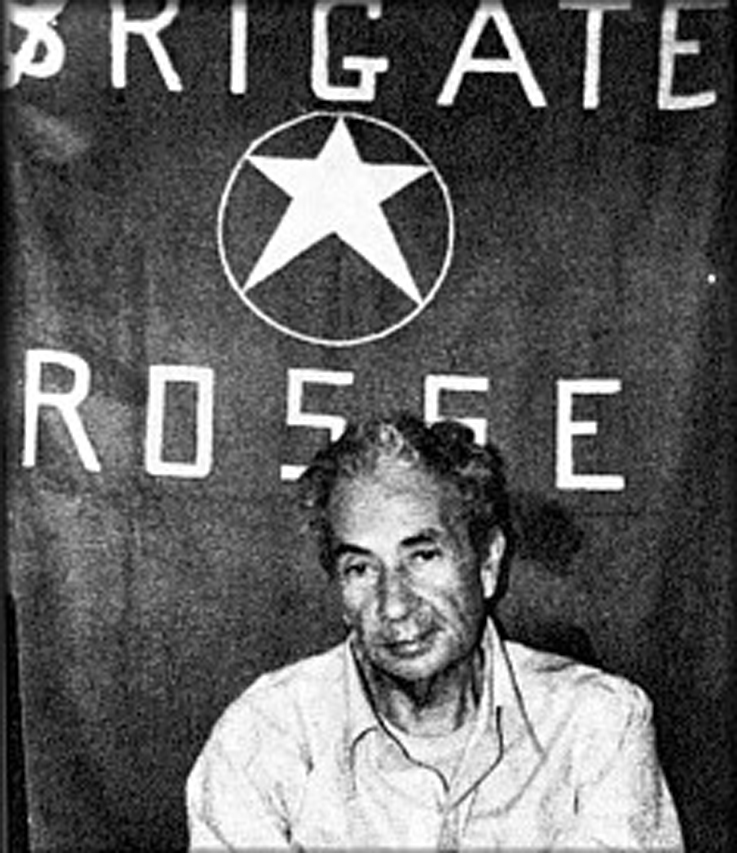
Aldo Moro, photographed during his kidnapping by the Red Brigades

Terrorism in Italy is related to political and subversive terrorism activities, carried out by various groups and organizations with different and sometimes conflicting methods, motivations and interests. This article is primarily about late 20th-century and early 21st-century terrorism.

Since the late 1960s, terrorism became a more serious issue in Italy. In the early part of this period, it was known as "opposed extremisms", later the media renamed this period as the "Years of Lead," inspired by Die bleierne Zeit, or Anni di piombo, a film by German director Margarethe von Trotta that won the Golden Lion at the Venice Film Festival in 1981. The "Years of Lead" period ended at the close of the 1980s decade.

At the end of the 1990s, a fresh wave of political terrorism, consisting of severe yet sporadic episodes, broke out again in Italy. Episodes occurred until the early 2000s.

In addition to political terrorism, which was widespread during the Cold War to contribute to the "strategy of tension", Mafia-linked terrorism was active in Sicily. The main criminal organizations that operated in that period were the Cosa Nostra, Camorra, 'Ndrangheta and Sacra Corona Unita.

== Years of Lead (1969–1980) ==
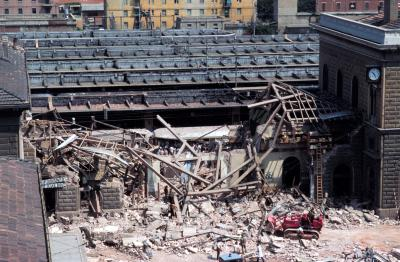
Aftermath of the bombing of the Bologna railway in August 1980 which killed 85 people, the deadliest event during the Years of lead.

Several scholars have to analyze and understand the causes during the longlasting periods of terrorism. Italy has suffered more from such political terrorism than most other European countries, with the exception of Northern Ireland and the Basque Country in Spain. In the early 21st century, political scientist Ernesto Galli della Loggia analyzed the issue of the Italian peculiarity, concluding that Italian society is characterized by a trace of violence. This interpretation was controversial, with opinions arising on both sides.

Giovanni Fassanella and Giovanni Pellegrino also addressed the issue of terrorism in their book titled "La Guerra civile" (The Civil War), which explores the fact that Italy has been threatened by outbreaks of civil war, or terrorist events, for more than fifty years. This instability has prevented the normal development of Italy.

There has been widespread suspicion among some analysts that part of the Italian 1970s history was influenced by the activity of members of Secret services and extra Parliamentary political groups, which had their own interests in destabilizing the Italian political system and influencing political choices.

Terrorism did not succeed in overthrowing the state. The several Marxist–Leninist far-left groups were ultimately defeated, and their energy faded.

At the same time, far-right groups, the same who wanted to change the political formula of the previous twenty five years, the same who terrorized the public opinion to underline the incapacity of the democratic system to guarantee the public order and to underline the need of an authoritarian regime, were defeated too.

The analysis and the debate of this complex historical period are still open. Part of the community associate those years with "left terrorism", others with "right terrorism", others with "state terrorism." Another part of the community believe that "there is only a partial, confused and often contradictory legal truth".

=== Major incidents ===
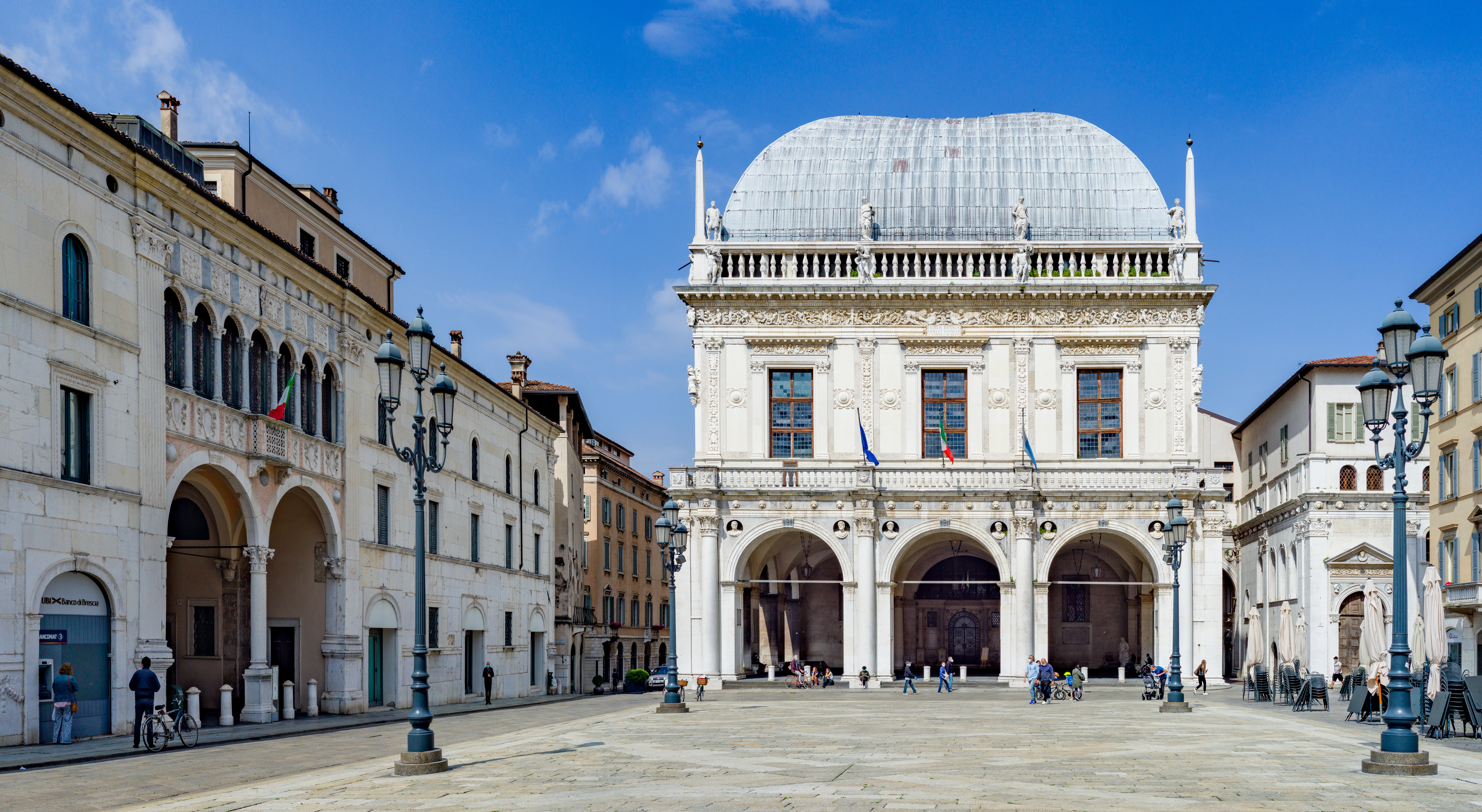
Piazza della Loggia, Brescia

- April 1969 Milan bombing: on 25 April 1969, a bomb exploded at the Fiat pavilion of Milan fair – wounding six people – and a second bomb was found unexploded at the Central Station currency exchange office. This episode is considered by many to be the beginning of the so-called "strategy of tension".
- Piazza Fontana bombing: on 12 December 1969, a bomb exploded in Milan, killing seventeen people and injuring eighty-eight; a second (unexploded) bomb was found at Piazza della Scala the same day, while other three bombs exploded in Rome in different locations, causing some wounded.
- Gioia Tauro massacre: on 22 July 1970, a train derailed due to a previous bomb sabotage, killing six people.
- Peteano massacre: on 31 May 1972, the explosion of a car bomb prepared by Ordine Nuovo militants killed three Carabinieri.
- Milan police headquarters bombing: on 17 May 1973, a grenade attack by the anarchist Gianfranco Bertoli killed four people and injured fifty-two others.
- Piazza della Loggia bombing: on 28 May 1974, a bomb exploded in Brescia, killing eight people.
- Padova MSI headquarter attack: on 17 June 1974, the Brigate Rosse killed two Missini supporters.
- Italicus Express bombing: on 4 August 1974, a bomb exploded on the Italicus train, killing twelve people and injuring forty-eight others.
- Via Fani massacre: on 16 March 1978, Aldo Moro was kidnapped by the Brigate rosse, who killed five bodyguards. On 9 May 1978, the Brigate Rosse killed Moro.
- Guido Rossa assassination: on 24 January 1979, the Brigate Rosse killed the union official Guido Rossa in Genova.
- Bologna massacre: on 2 August 1980, a bomb exploded at the Bologna Centrale railway station, killing eighty-five people and wounding more than two hundred others.

== Political terrorism ==
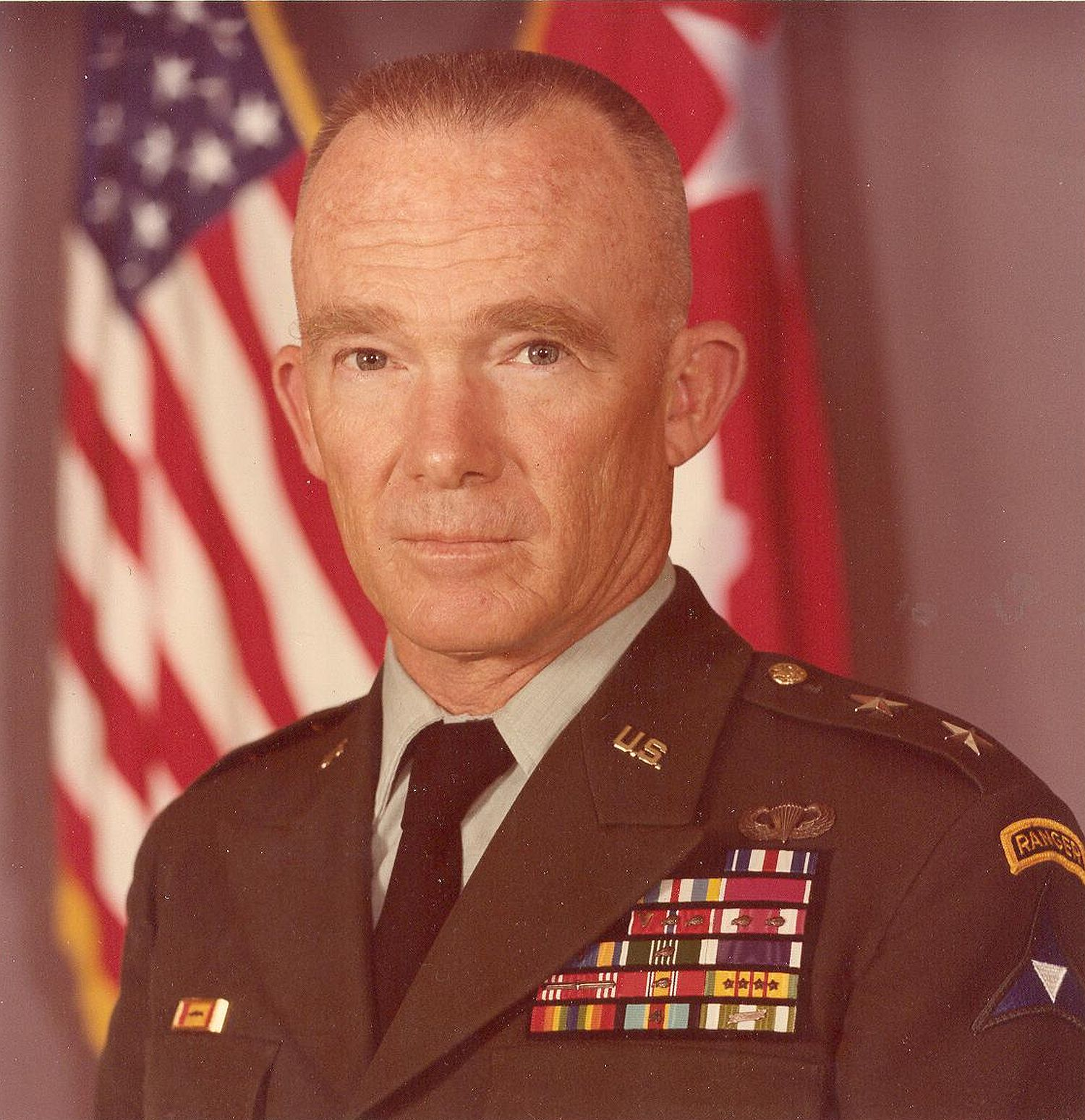
James Lee Dozier

The end of the "Years of Lead" is conventionally associated with the liberation of the United States General James Lee Dozier through a bloodless NOCS operation that took place in Padua on 28 January 1982. Actually, in 1988, the tenth anniversary of the kidnapping of Aldo Moro, there was the assassination of the Christian Democrat senator Roberto Ruffini, who is considered by the Brigate Rosse the successor of Aldo Moro.

Over the decade, the number of violent episodes waned, partially due to the loss of support of the Brigate Rosse as a result of the assassination of the communist worker Guido Rossa in 1979.

The idea that the armed struggle could lead to the changing of the constitutional order progressively became weak, and, according to some scientists, at the same time, there was the growth of the capitalist wave which transformed productivity and economic competition into values, considering them as the only progress indexes.

The following political terrorism, in particular the "red" one, restricted its objectives, trying to condition social and political processes and to maintain a certain pressure on the democratic freedom of decision. This third wave of political terrorism, despite being extremely irregular and uneven, reaped victims until the beginning of the 21st century.

One of these episodes was the 1988 Naples bombing, when American servicemen were targeted by Japanese far-left terrorists.

== Separatist terrorism ==
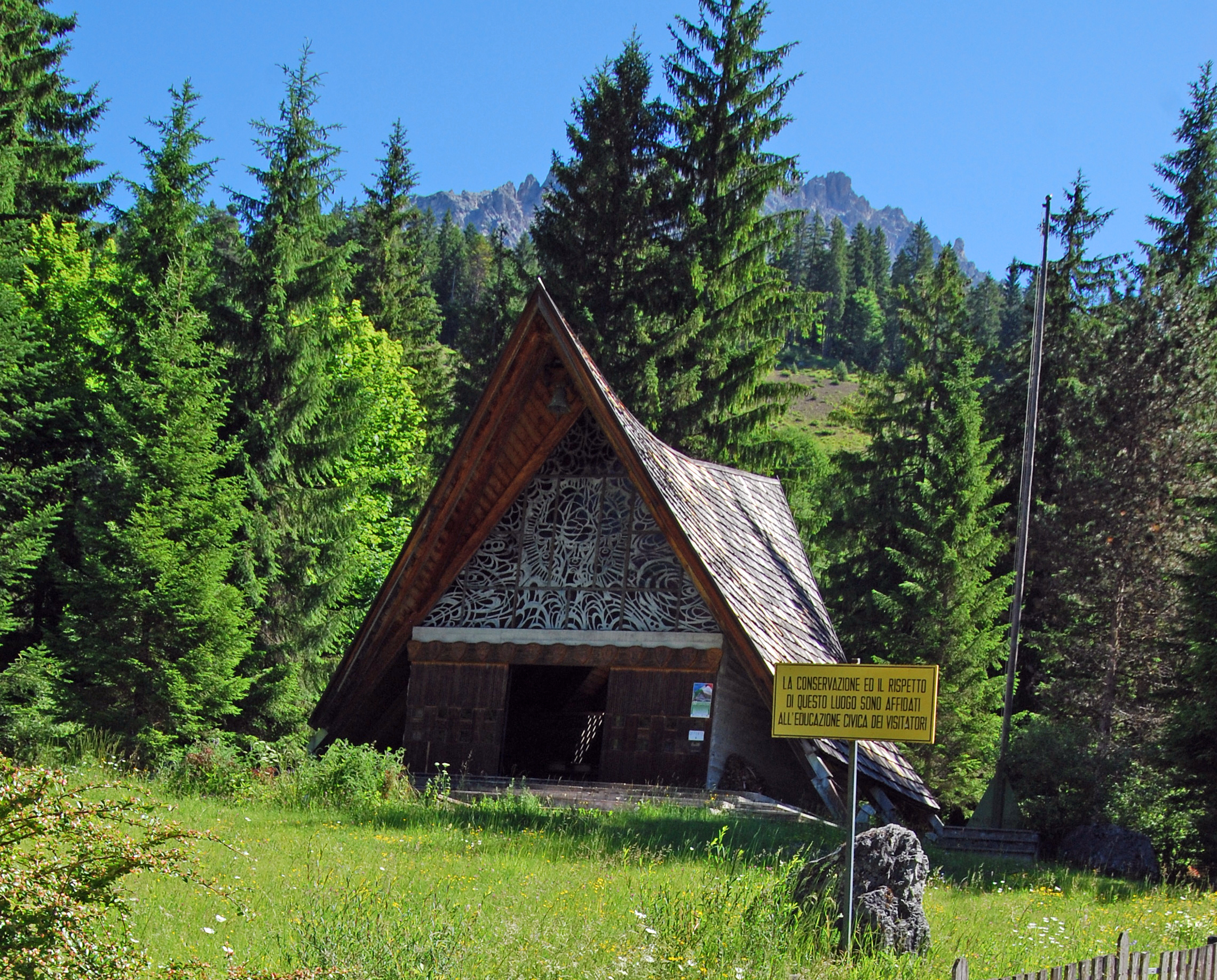
The church of the fallen of the Cima Vallona ambush

The terrorism period in South Tyrol begins in the second half of the 1950s. Aim of the terrorists was the independence from Italy or the annexation to Austria. The first attacks can be ascribable to the Stieler group, but the most important illegal organization was the Committee for the Liberation of South Tyrol (Befreiungsausschuss Südtirol). Its first remarkable action was the so-called "Night of Fire", in 1961, when terrorists blew up several trellis using 350 explosive devices, with the intention of drawing international attention on the South Tyrol question. In the following years, there was the radicalization of this kind of terrorism and it started targeting Italian police forces.

The bloodiest attacks by the group were Cima Vallona ambush in 1967, which resulted in the death of four Italian officers and the wounding of another and the 1966 Malga Sasso barracks bombing which killed three Guardia di Finanza guards and wounded four others.

Among the most wanted member of South Tyrol terrorism there are Sepp Kerschbaumer, Georg Klotz, whose daughter Eva Klotz is considered the current leader of the South Tyrol independence movement.

Although the 1970s were relatively a "soft" period, the 1980s were characterized by the reappearance of the South Tyrol terrorism as a Neo-Nazi criminal organization, Ein Tirol, which was responsible for several dynamite attacks.

As regard the analysis of the South Tyrol terrorism from the 20 September 1956 to the 30 October 1988, there were 361 attacks, 21 dead, 15 police officers, two civilians and four terrorists, killed by their own explosive devices, 57 wounded, 24 police officers and 33 civilians.

== Political terrorism in Sardinia ==
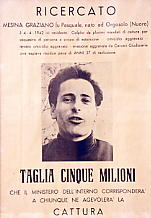
Graziano Mesina

The season of political terrorism, initiated in Italy at the beginning of the post-war period, spread across the island of Sardinia in the second half of the 1960s and it came to an end in the 1980s, as it happened in Italy.

Contacts between local outlaws and militants belonging to the Italian far left organizations, such as Brigate Rosse and Nuclei Armati Proletari, were partially facilitated by the detention of extreme Left supporters in the maximum security prisons of the island, as it happened with the southern Italian mafiosi who were kept in prison in Northern Italy, conditioning the birth of "Mala del Brenta".

The most famous terrorist and paramilitary groups in Italy were Barbagia Rossa, Movimento Armato Sardo e Comitato di Solidarietà con il Proletariato Prigioniero Sardo Deportato, most of them were loyal to the communist and separatist ideology; within a decade, they claimed several attacks, assassinations and kidnappings.

Among the main supporters of the subversive and secessionist cause, there was Giangiacomo Feltrinelli, who tried several times to make contact with numerous organizations to make Sardinia independent from Italy, helped by some separatist militant groups, and to establish a communist government based on the model proposed by Fidel Castro in Cuba.

The election of Graziano Mesina as the leader of the rebels, the most famous outlaw of the Sardinian criminal organization, were supported by both the local groups, as shown by several contacts with them, and the deviate secret services.

An attempt was the dynamite attack in August 2004, in Porto Rotondo, Sardinia, against the Chairman of the Italian Council Silvio Berlusconi during the visit of the English Prime Minister Tony Blair; the attack was claimed by the so-called secessionist movements Organizzazione Indipendentista Rivoluzionaria (Oir) and Nuclei Proletari per il Comunismo (Npc).

== Present political terrorism ==
Toward the end of the 1990s, few years later the politically motivated assassinations, there was the reappearance on the extra-parliamentary environment of the so-called Left insurgent terrorism, which led to the reconstruction of subversive organisms dissolved at the end of the "Years of Lead", such as "Nuove BR".

According to this perspective, there was the assassinations of the consultants for the Ministry of Employment Massimo D'Antona, on 20 March 1999, and Marco Biagi, on 19 March 2002, both claimed by the reborn Brigate Rosse, with the aim to put pressure on the socio-political scenario, like the "Years of Lead". The last victim, Emanuele Petri, agent of the Polfer, killed on 2 March 2003 during a fire fight on a train on which the new leaders of the subversive organization, Nadia Desdemona Lioce and Mario Galesi, was travelling.

In 2003, the group was officially dissolved as consequence of the arrest of Nadia Lioce, the death of Mario Galesi and the arrests of the other members of the group. In 2005, Nadia Lioce is sentenced to spend the rest of her life in prison.

Deportation of foreign suspects have been the cornerstone of Italy's counter-terrorism strategy and from January 2015 to April 2018, 300 individuals were expulsed from Italian soil.

== Anarchist terrorism ==
Toward the end of the 1990s and for all the 2000s, a permanent subversive activity related to insurgency anarchist terrorism has been carried out. Those anarchist terrorist actions were characterized by the usage of explosives. The Informal Anarchist Federation (FAI), was the organization that claimed most part of those attacks.

An anarchic organization known as "Solidarietà Internazionale" led a series of attacks from 1998 to 2000 in Milan. In the summer of 1998 several letter bombs were sent to different politicians, journalists, magistrates and police officers, following the death of the anarchists Maria Soledad Rosas and Edoardo Massari. These activists, known as "Sun and Flash", died by suicide in a detention facility where they were falsely imprisoned for eco-terrorism. It was later discovered that the charge that accused them of being responsible of these actions, was a jurisdictional stunt.

In October 1998 an attack took place in the police station. In Summer 1999 two bombs were found, but for a fluke they did not burst. The foiled attack was claimed by "Solidarietà Internazionale". On 28 June 2000; incendiary bottles were thrown in Sant'Ambrogio basilica by the members of the same group, during the ceremony for the penitentiary police, but they did not explode.

In September 2001 the investigations of 14 different inter-regional prosecutors, led to a maxi raid at national level, that investigated about 60 people linked to the organization and charged with "criminal conspiracy with intent to commit a terrorist attacks and a subversion of democracy". The group had several contacts with subversive associations in Greek and England, and their aim was the fight for anarchic prisoners in Spain who were under strict regime prison.

On 1 December 2000 a worker noticed a bag hidden between the fourth and the third steeple of Milan's dome. The bomb was defused but it was programmed to explode at 3 a.m. of the following night, loaded with more than one kg of explosive.

In the night of 16 December 2009, an improvised explosive device partially exploded inside the Bocconi University of Milan. The bomb was placed in order to demand for the closure of the Identification and Expulsion Centers, and it was claimed by the FAI in a flier signed by "Nucleo Maurizio Morales" delivered to the newspaper office of Libero. About that, the FAI declared that it wasn't its responsibility and reported a defamatory usage of the acronym.

== Islamic terrorism in Italy ==
=== First Wave ===
- December 1973: Fatah, a Palestinian military organization executed series of attacks originating at Rome-Fiumicino Airport in Italy which resulted in the deaths of 34 people. The attacks began with an airport-terminal invasion and hostage-taking, followed by the firebombing of a Pan Am aircraft and the hijacking of a Lufthansa flight.
- October 1982: The Great Synagogue of Rome attack was carried out by armed Palestinian terrorists at the entrance to the Great Synagogue of Rome. 1 baby was murdered, Stefano Gaj Taché, and 37 other civilians were injured.
- December 1985, The Rome and Vienna airport attacks were carried out. Seven Arab terrorists attacked two airports in Rome, Italy, and Vienna, Austria, with assault rifles and hand grenades. 19 civilians were killed and over a hundred were injured before four of the terrorists were killed by El Al Security personnel and local police, who captured the remaining three. It was reported they had the Islamic and Anti-Zionist motives.

=== Second Wave ===
By the early 1990s, various jihadist networks in Italy with their roots in North Africa had been investigated by Italian authorities. Among these were the Islamic Cultural Institute (ICI) in Milan which operated in the global jihadist movement during the Bosnian War. ICI operations diminished after a number of counter-terrorist measures.

After the attacks of the 9/11, Islamic terrorism came back into the public debate. The reports written by Italian and foreign security agencies, showed that several Islamic cells were placed in Italy; they were related to each other and waiting for calls and tasks. In 2001 the American embassy in Rome closed during New Year's Eve, for fear of possible attacks.

In the mid-2000s, Italy did not experience an increase in jihadist attacks like several other major European countries. Italian authorities found that the number of "homegrown" jihadists who had been born in Italy was low and this was due to demographics: mass immigration of Muslims didn't start until the late 1980s and therefore second-generation Muslims had barely entered adulthood.

In December 2008, Rachid Ilhami and Albdelkader Ghafir, two Moroccan citizens, were arrested in Giussano, on the charge of planning attacks in their home town. The two men had planned three attacks in areas nearby Giussano: in the Esselunga Supermarket in Seregno, in the big parking close to the supermarket and at the local police station.

On 12 October 2009, the first suicide attack, with the high potential of causing a massacre, was carried out by a Libyan man in Milan, against a police station. The level of explosive used by the perpetrator was not high enough to cause extensive damages, and the bomber himself did not die, but he was injured together with a soldier who tried to stop him. A report to the Parliament about this event, formulated the hypothesis that the perpetrator was not connected to proper extremist organizations, but he was just a "lone wolf".

Despite Italy having several factors which could have made it a hub of jihadist activity such as proximity to the Middle East and North Africa, relatively porous borders and a large influx migrants from Muslim majority countries, Italy has not experienced the same surge in radicalization as other European countries. While 125 individuals with "ties" to Italy, a minority of whom are Italian citizens, left Italy to join the civil war in Iraq and Syria, this is a small number considering that Belgium had 470 and Sweden had 300 such individuals despite both having much smaller populations. Since the September 11 attacks in 2001, there have been a small number of plots either thwarted or failed. Two individuals born in Italy have been involved in 2010s terrorist attacks, Youssef Zaghba one of the trio of attackers in the June 2017 London Bridge attack while ISIS sympathizer Ismail Tommaso Hosni attacked soldiers at Milan's Central station in May 2017.

In the 2010s, Italy, like other European countries, experienced an increase in jihadist activities but on a lesser scale.

In July 2018, a 31-year-old Tunisian was deported from Naples due to ties to extremists. He was the 300th deportee due to extremism and the 63rd since the start of 2018.

In December 2025, nine individuals were arrested for allegedly raising millions of euros for Hamas over the course of over two years under the guise for fundraising for humanitarian aid. The police stated that those arrested are "specifically accused of carrying out financing operations believed to have contributed to terrorist activities".

== Fugitive terrorists ==
At the beginning of 2007, during a Parliamentary question, the Minister of Justice Clemente Mastella and the Interior Minister Giuliano Amato made public a list of fugitive terrorists "wanted for terrorist organization, armed gang or subversive organization", in which are stated "113 suspects, 59 belong to Left terrorist groups, 11 to Right terrorist group, 43 to international terrorist groups". Over the last few years, European arrest warrant has made extradition and processes for terrorists living abroad easier.

== Omissis and state secrecy ==
On 7 November 1977, Law 801 came into force and it imposed secrecy on "acts, documents, news, activities and anything else whose circulation might result in damages to the integrity of the democratic State". In April 2008, a government decree stated that classified documents cannot be kept secret for more than 30 years, giving accessibility to documents that had been made secret more than 30 years before. The end of the State secrecy "does not automatically lead to the revocation or disclosure of classified documents"

=== Use of state secrecy ===
- During the investigation on White coup d'ètat, the State secrecy was imposed by the Government, but, according to Edoardo Sogno, the secrecy was not on the coup d'ètat, it was instead on a Hungarian revolution memorandum and other documents concerning Mario Scelba.
- In 1985, the Chairman of the Italian Council Bettino Craxi imposed secrecy on documents about Augusto Cauchi, black terrorist exiled by the SID in 1974, during the Italicus Express bombing process.
- In 1988, State secrecy was imposed to the judge Carlo Mastelloni who was investigating on the fall of a Sismi military airplane, Argo 16, exploded in 1973, killing the whole plane crew.

== Mafia associations ==
=== Cosa Nostra ===
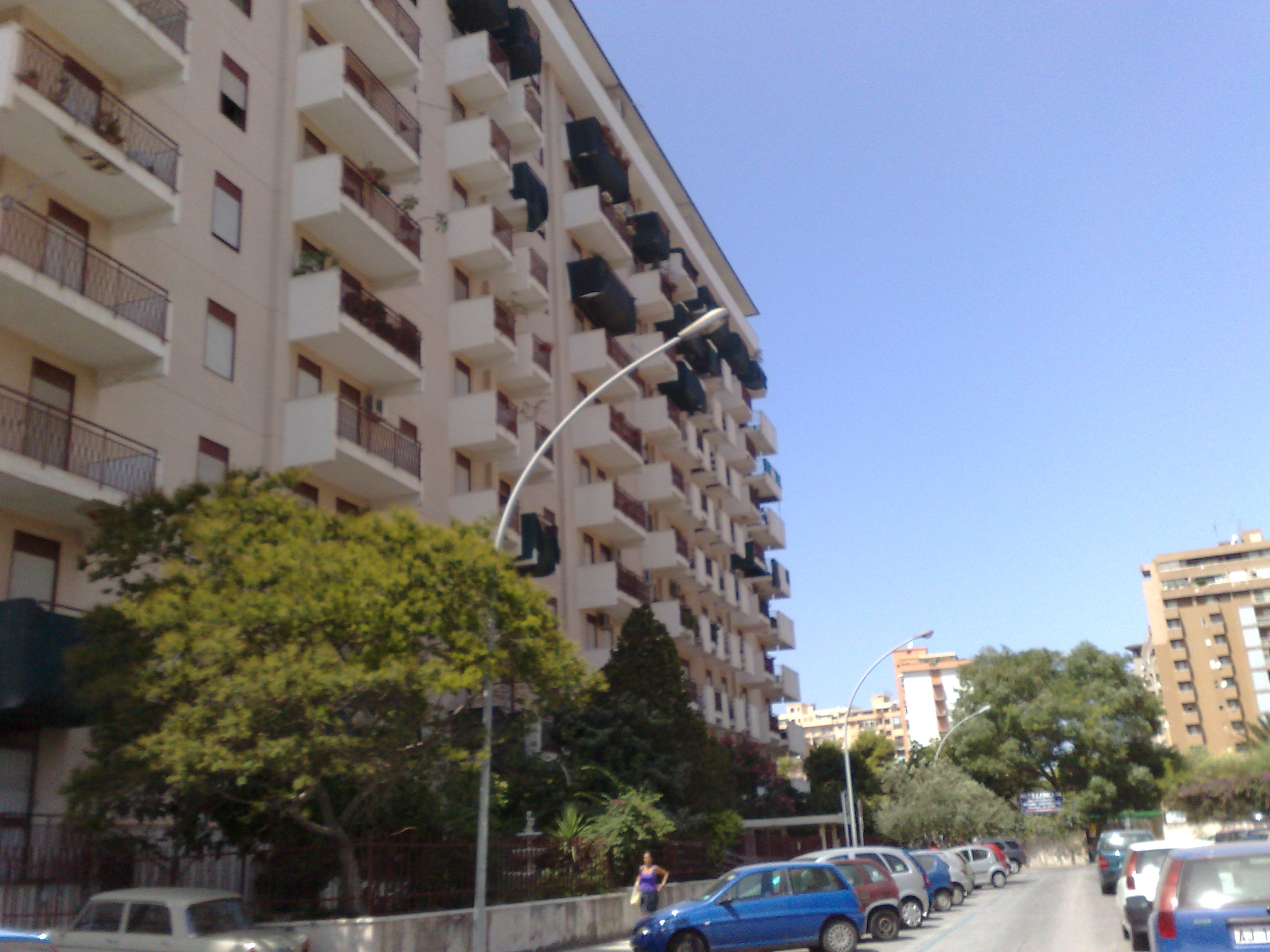
The buildings where Paolo Borsellino's mother lived. The bomb exploded while he was walking to the entrance gate

The Italian mafia's association Cosa Nostra tried to influence the political and judiciary events also by resorting to violence, through the usage of explosives to spread terror. On 23 December 1984, mafia boss Giuseppe Calò organized the Train 904 bombing, together with some members of Camorra and with members of Neo-fascist groups. This massacre caused the death of 17 people and injured 267, for the purpose of catching the eye of authorities and distracting them from the investigations of anti-mafia pools and from the declarations of the cooperating witnesses Tommaso Buscetta and Salvatore Contorno.

In 1992–93 Cosa Nostra returned to terrorist activities, as a consequence of several life sentences pronounced during the "Maxi trial", and of the new anti-mafia measures launched by the government. In 1992 two major dynamite attacks killed the judges Giovanni Falcone (23 May in the Capaci bombing) and Paolo Borsellino (19 July in the Via D'Amelio bombing).

One year later (May–July 1993), after the arrest of mob boss Salvatore Riina, the Mafia furthered their campaign of terrorism on the Italian mainland. Tourist spots were attacked, such as the Via dei Georgofili in Florence, Via Palestro in Milan, and the Piazza San Giovanni in Laterano and Via San Teodoro in Rome, leaving 10 dead and 93 injured and causing severe damage to cultural heritage such as the Uffizi Gallery. The Catholic Church openly condemned the Mafia, and two churches were bombed and an anti-Mafia priest shot dead in Rome.

== See also ==
- Islamic terrorism in Europe
- List of terrorist incidents
- Terrorism in the United States
- Hindu terrorism
- Left-wing terrorism
- Right-wing terrorism
