= Roccastrada massacre =

1921 fascist massacre in Roccastrada, Italy

- Location: Roccastrada, Province of Grosseto, Kingdom of Italy
- Date: 24 July 1921
- Deaths: 10
- Injuries: At least 30
- Perpetrator: Fascist blackshirts led by Dino Castellani
- Motive: Anti-socialist political repression

The Roccastrada massacre was a fascist attack carried out on 24 July 1921 in Roccastrada, province of Grosseto, during the period of political violence preceding the March on Rome. Fascist Squadristi led by Dino Castellani attacked the town, killing ten civilians, injuring at least thirty others, and destroying homes and businesses associated with socialists and other political opponents.

== Background ==
In the aftermath of World War I, Roccastrada became one of the centres of social and political unrest that characterized Italy's Biennio Rosso. The Maremma region experienced widespread labour disputes involving miners, agricultural workers and sharecroppers, while the Italian Socialist Party gained strong electoral support. In the 1920 municipal elections the socialists won control of the Roccastrada council for the first time, replacing the long-standing republican administration.

Growing tensions between socialist organizations, local landowners and employers contributed to an increasingly violent political climate. During 1920, conflicts over agricultural contracts culminated in demonstrations against landowner Ferdinando Pierazzi, who would later become one of the leading figures of fascism in the Maremma.

Meanwhile, fascist violence escalated throughout Tuscany. From early 1921, squads led by figures such as Dino Perrone Compagni carried out attacks against socialist and trade union organizations. In June 1921, former army officer Dino Castellani was sent to Grosseto to organize local fascist squads. After violent clashes in the provincial capital on 29 June, fascists conducted their first punitive expedition against Roccastrada on 1 July, destroying socialist and communist headquarters and threatening local political leaders. Fearing further reprisals, many socialist activists fled the town or hid in the surrounding countryside, while mayor Natale Bastiani was kidnapped and forced to sign a letter promising to leave Roccastrada.

== Massacre ==
On the evening of 24 July 1921, two trucks carrying around sixty armed fascist Squadristi, led by Castellani, entered Roccastrada as part of a punitive expedition. The attackers systematically targeted the homes and businesses of prominent socialist officials, including mayor Bastiani and members of the local cooperative, looting and setting fire to several buildings. They also assaulted civilians in the streets, beating residents and firing revolvers indiscriminately while the local Carabinieri failed to intervene.

As the column left the town to continue the expedition in nearby villages, a shot—later believed to have been accidentally fired from one of the fascists' own vehicles—killed the young squadrist Ivo Saletti. Believing they had been ambushed by local socialists, the fascists immediately returned to Roccastrada and launched a second, far more violent assault against the civilian population.

The squad opened fire indiscriminately on people in the streets and in their homes, killing nine civilians, including socialists, republicans, anarchists and individuals with no active political role. At least thirty other people were wounded, while many residents escaped by fleeing into the surrounding countryside. Approximately fifteen houses, together with barns and haystacks, were destroyed or burned during the attack. A tenth victim, Giovanni Gori, died from his wounds on 9 August, bringing the final death toll to ten.

The violence continued for several hours before reinforcements from Siena finally arrived. Instead of arresting the perpetrators, the authorities escorted Castellani and his men safely out of the town. Upon returning to Grosseto, the fascist squad publicly celebrated the expedition, and no immediate arrests were made.

== Victims ==
The massacre resulted in the deaths of ten civilians, most of whom were local residents with no political involvement. The victims were:

- Angelo Barni
- Guido Bartoletti
- Tommaso Bartoletti (father of Guido)
- Ezio Checcucci
- Antonio Fabbri
- Francesco Minoccheri
- Luigi Nativi
- Giuseppe Regoli
- Vincenzo Tacconi
- Giovanni Gori (died 16 days later)

== Aftermath ==
The massacre received widespread coverage in the Italian press and prompted the Ministry of the Interior to send Public Security inspector Alfredo Paolella to Grosseto to investigate the events. His report strongly criticised the conduct of the local authorities, highlighting both the failure of the Carabinieri to intervene during the violence and the close relationship between senior law enforcement officials and the fascist movement in the province. The inquiry led to the removal of the prefect of Grosseto, Antonio Boragno, from office.

The victims were buried in Roccastrada on 26 July 1921 in a funeral attended by a large crowd, although political speeches and party symbols were deliberately avoided in an effort to prevent further violence. On the same day, the funeral of the fascist Ivo Saletti was held in Grosseto with the participation of fascist leaders, including Castellani and Gino Aldi Mai.

== Trials ==
Although investigations initially involved dozens of suspects, only two fascists, including Castellani, were eventually committed for trial, while most of the others were acquitted for lack of evidence. The 1922 fascist amnesty effectively extinguished all criminal charges against the perpetrators.

Following the liberation of Italy in World War II, the 1922 amnesty was revoked and the case was reopened. In 1946, the Court of Assizes of Grosseto convicted Castellani, sentencing him to 25 years' imprisonment. Ostilio Tegardi received 22 years and six months' imprisonment, later reduced to 15 years, while Federico Fineschi, Vittorio Furi, Mario Giannini, and Arnaldo Albano were sentenced to prison terms ranging from 18 to 11 years. The sentences were eventually reduced and later commuted.

== Sources ==
- Capitini Maccabruni, Nicola (1985). La Maremma contro il nazi-fascismo. Grosseto: La Commerciale.
- Cansella, Ilaria. "Roccastrada 1921. Un paese a ferro e fuoco". ToscanaNovecento.
- Dominici, Franco; Betti, Giulietto (2021). 1921: la strage fascista di Roccastrada (in Italian). Pitigliano: Stampa Alternativa.
- Franzinelli, Mimmo (2019). Squadristi. Protagonisti e tecniche della violenza fascista 1919–1922. Milan: Feltrinelli.
