= Salussola massacre =

World War II partisan deaths in Italy

Coordinates: 45°48′N 8°05′E

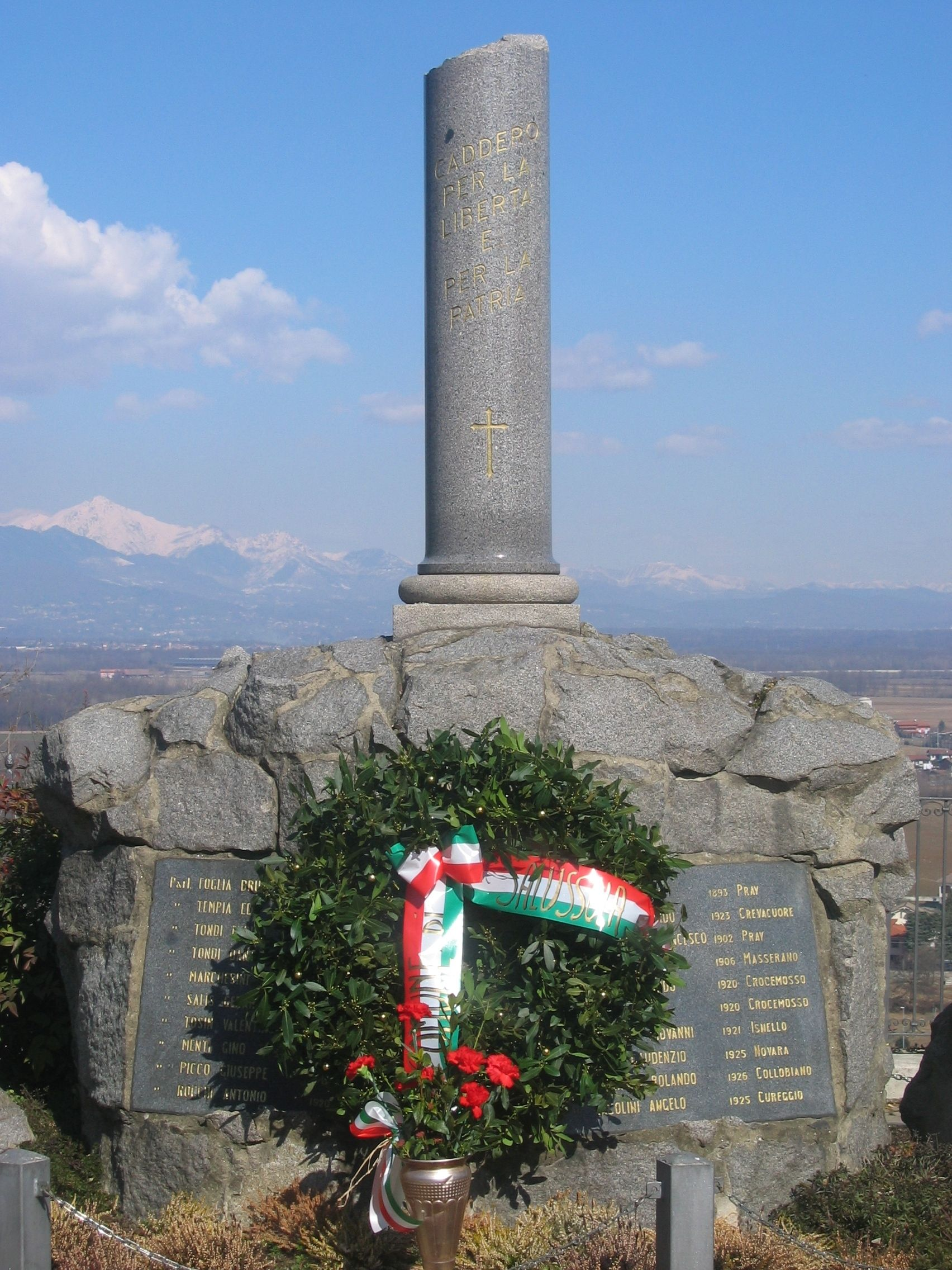
- Monument built in Salussola, nearby the place where on March 9, 1945, were murdered 20 young partisans in retaliation by a group of Italian fascist soldiers.
- Location: Salussola, Italy
- Date: 9 March 1945 dawn
- Target: Partisans
- Deaths: 20
- Injuries: 1
- Perpetrator: Black Brigades

On March 9, 1945, in the Italian town of Salussola, Italian Fascist soldiers executed 20 Italian Partisans after torturing them. The fascists intended the massacre as an act of retaliation for an attack conducted a few days earlier by other Partisans on a column of military trucks under the "Montebello"'s Fascist Command.

== The facts ==
In late February 1945, the 109th Garibaldi Brigade, was moving across Piedmont (N.W. Italy) which at the time was occupied by German troops and held by the Italian Black Brigades During the march, a detachment of "Zoppis" made up of 33 partisans, stopped to rest in a farmhouse in the Province of Vercelli. In the early hours of March 1, they were taken by surprise and taken prisoner by a Command of Italian Fascist soldiers. The thirty-three men were all taken to different places and a group of twenty-one was led towards the small town of Biella. The Fascista soldier then pretended to create an exchange with German prisoners. but in Salussola, after a whole night of torture and violences documented by the only one survivor, the prisoners were killed by machine guns at dawn on March 9, 1945. The massacre was intended as a reprisal to an attack conducted a few days earlier by other Partisans to a column of military trucks of the "Montebello"’s Fascist Command, which were moving through Salussola. A truck was destroyed in the attack and four soldiers killed.

== The victims ==
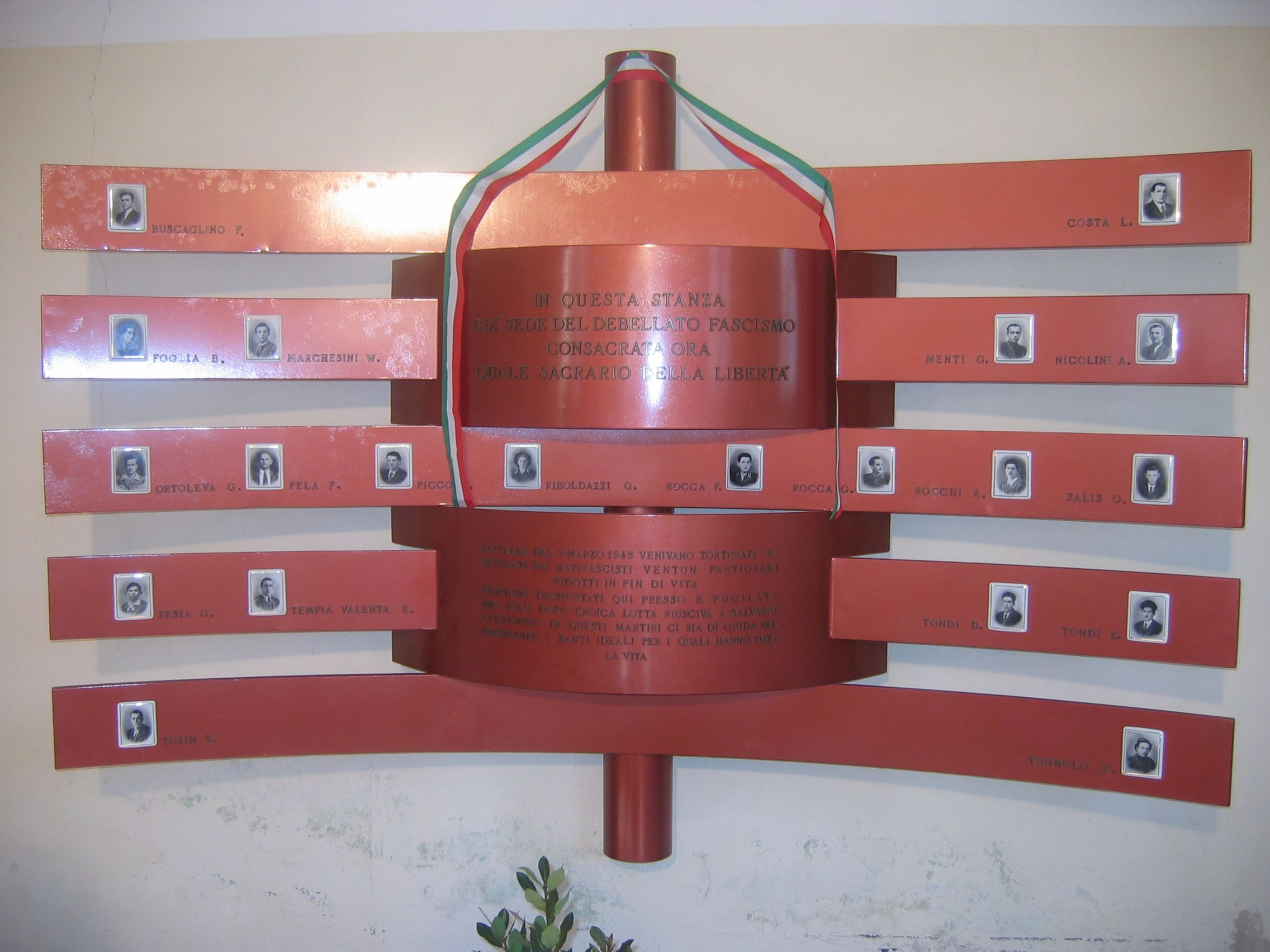
memorial of the Salussola's slaughter (1945) conserved in the Town Museum. It memorialises the 20 partisans murdered there in retaliation by Italian fascists on March 9, 1945.

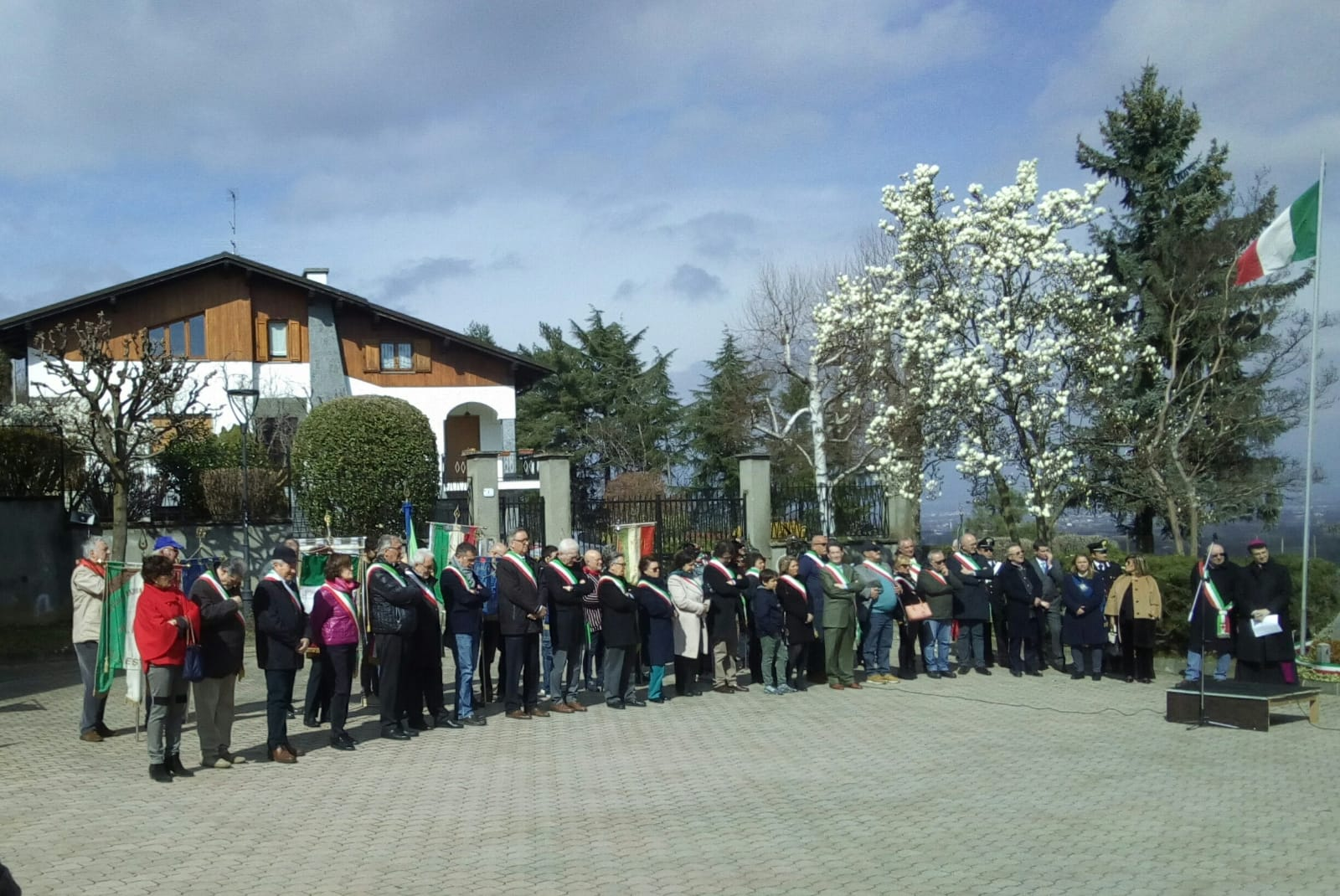
The authorities deployed during the commemoration of the 74th anniversary of the massacre (10 March 2019)

Note: Alias (noms de guerre) were a very important part in the life of the Partisans. Mainly used to conceal the true identity (it was a clandestine army) the Alias name outlined also in most cases the character and the personality of the owners. It thus enabled at the same time to hide oneself outside, and to be recognized inside among the other Partisans for a personal, moral or physical characteristic.

- Buscaglino Francesco alias "Barbera" born in Pray (Bi) in 1902
- Costa Luigi alias "Gigi" born in Masserano (Bi) in 1906
- Foglia Bruno alias "Ebano" born in Crevacuore (Bi) in 1926
- Marchesini Valter alias "Orlando" born in Crevacuore (Bi) in 1925
- Menti Gino alias "Colassi" born in Pray (Bi) in 1914
- Nicolini Angelo alias "Budda" born in Cureggio (No) in 1925
- Ortoleva Giovanni alias "Iacon" born in Isnello (Pa) in 1921
- Picco Giuseppe alias "Trento" born in Roasio (Vc) in 1916
- Pela Francesco alias "Cirillo" born in Pray (Bi) in 1893
- Ronchi Antonio alias "Figaro" born in Lessona (Bi) in 1920
- Riboldazzi Guido alias "Pulcino" born in Crevacuore (Bi) in 1923
- Rocca Florindo alias "Lince" born in Crocemosso ora Vallemosso (Bi) in 1920
- Rocca Giulio alias "Gino" born in Crocemosso ora Vallemosso (Bi) in 1920
- Sesia Gaudenzio alias "Sesia" born in Novara in 1925
- Salis Gerardo alias "Palmiro" born ind Asigliano (Vc) in 1926
- Tempia Valenta Edo alias "Brunello" born in Mezzana (Bi) in 1926
- Tondi Enrico alias "Vecio" born in Lessona (Bi) in 1900
- Tondi Dante alias "Legnano" born in Lessona (Bi) in 1915
- Tugnolo Rolando alias "Dispari" born in Collobiano (Vc) in 1926
- Tosin Valentino alias "Bissa" born in Mezzana (Bi) in 1911

== See also ==
- Sant'Anna di Stazzema massacre
- Lidice
- Kľak
- Oradour-sur-Glane
- Ochota massacre
- Khatyn massacre
- Italian Campaign (World War II)
- List of massacres in Italy
- German war crimes

== Sources ==
- ad memoriam (in Italian) audio testimony of the only partisan who escaped the massacre
- "Sala dell'eccidio" (in Italian) "Slaughter's room" set up in the Museum–Laboratory of gold and stone in Salussola.
- I 20 trucidati names and images of the 20 murdered partisans.
- Statement made by the priest father Giuseppe Dotto on October 19, 1945 the commander of the Police Station of Salussola. (in Italian).
- The speech of the Minister of Defense Antonio Martino in 2002 (in Italian)
- Photos of Commemoration 2002 – Ministry of Defence
- The Partisan "Pittore" is named Knight of the Republic (in Italian)
