= Night of Fire =

1961 terrorist incident in Italy

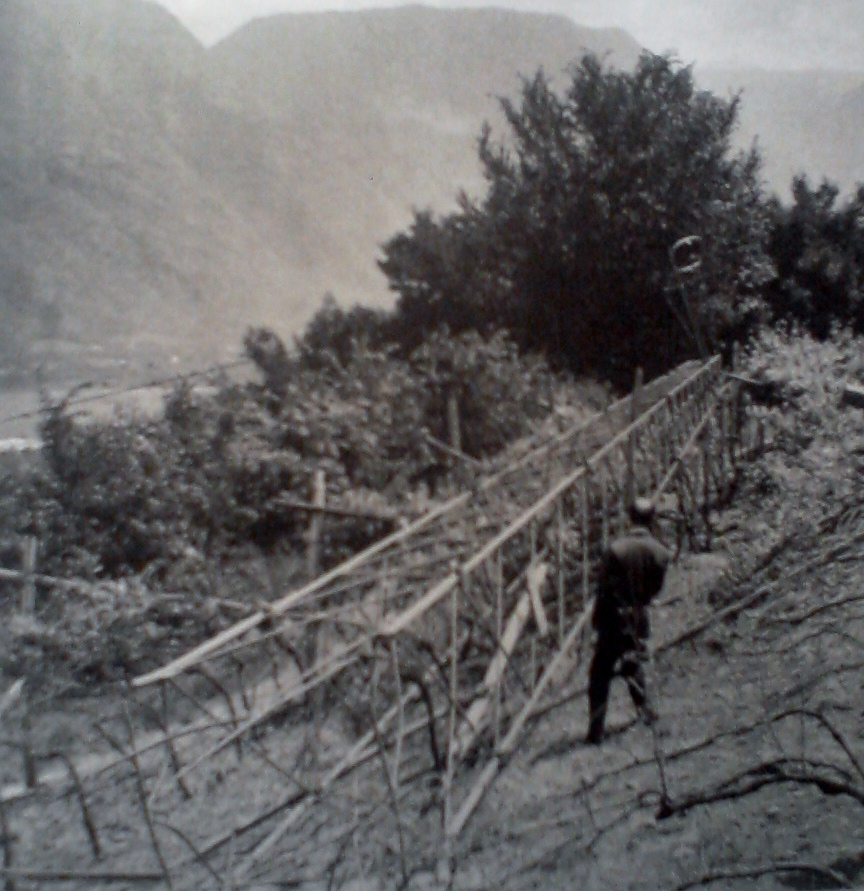
Electricity pylon blown-up during the Night of Fire

The Night of Fire (German: Feuernacht; Italian: Notte dei fuochi) happened on the night of 12 June 1961 when 37 electricity pylons were blown up in South Tyrol by the South Tyrolean Liberation Committee. It formed a turning point in the history of the province.

== Background ==
After fascism came to an end in Italy, the situation of the German-speaking population in South Tyrol seemed to be getting better. However, a large section of the population was not ready to accept the status quo as existed under Benito Mussolini. Even though fundamental questions were addressed in the Treaty of Paris, the conditions of the treaty were rarely fully fulfilled. In addition, many German speakers of the province wanted to renege their attachment to Italy and to once again become part of Austria and others wanted to become self-governing. Starting in 1957, small militant groups were prepared to use force to achieve their aims. The night of fire was the starting point for a series of attacks throughout the 1960s, planned and carried out by a group called the South Tyrolean Liberation Committee (Befreiungsausschuss Südtirol (BAS)).

== Aims ==
The aim of the attacks was, first and foremost, to make the world aware of the South Tyrolean question. By blowing up the electricity pylons the electricity supply to the Bolzano industrial zone was cut off. This goal was not achieved during the Night of Fire, but the world was indeed made aware of the plight of the province.

The immediate response of the Italian state was to massively increase the military and police presence there. One month later there was another attempt, at a smaller scale, which did indeed cut off the power supply to a part of the northern Italian industrial zone and forced international trains to grind to a halt.

== See also ==
- Sepp Kerschbaumer
- Cima Vallona ambush
- Malga Sasso barracks bombing
