= Barletta massacre =

1943 massacre of Italians by Nazi Germany

- Part of the Italian campaign
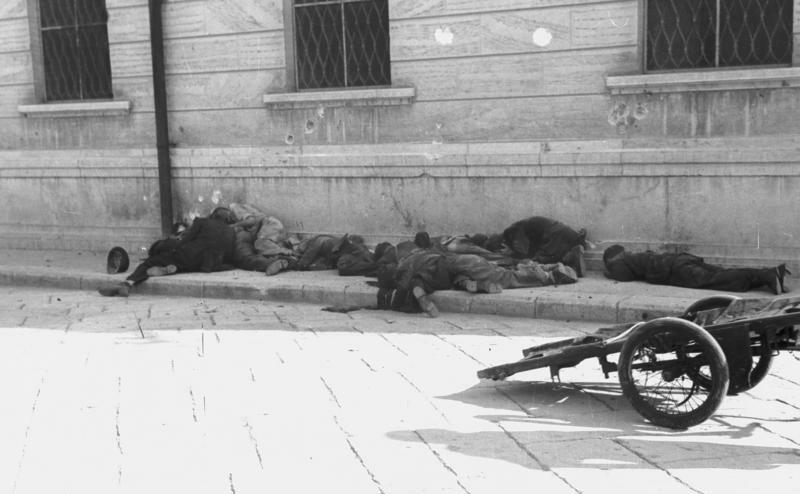
- Corpses on the ground after the massacre
- Location: 41°19′04.7″N 16°16′52.63″E; Barletta, Apulia, Italy
- Date: 12 September 1943
- Target: Italian civilians
- Attack type: Massacre
- Deaths: 12
- Injuries: 1
- Perpetrator: Soldiers of the Fallschirm-Jäger-Division
- Motive: Reprisal for the strong resistance by civilians

The Barletta massacre (Italian: Eccidio di Barletta), was a German war crime that took place on 12 September 1943 in the city of Barletta in Italy. The event took place following the Italian surrender on 8 September 1943. Twelve Italian civilians were killed and several hundred houses were destroyed by artillery fire of the Waffen-SS under the command of Hart Gloocke. The massacre was captured by numerous photos and film by Germans.

The Barletta massacre is referred to as one of the first German World War II massacre on civilians in Italy, from the Italian surrender of 8 September.

== History ==
The massacre of Barletta was conceived as a Nazi retaliation for the strenuous resistance found in the Italian city, both by civilians and by the military. In the days preceding the massacre, in fact, there had been clashes in the city between Italian and German armed forces, which saw the Italians as victorious. The Germans were thus forced to ask for reinforcements and to attack civilian buildings, thus forcing the Italian soldiers to surrender. That surrender occurred on September 10, 1943, two days before the massacre.

== Subsequent events ==
Between 8 and 25 September 1943 a further 35 civilians and soldiers were killed. The Germans were only put to flight by the Allies in mid-September. On 25 September 1943 the Third English Army entered Barletta.
