= Gino Aldi Mai =

Italian politician (1877–1940)

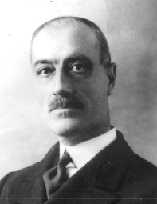

Member of the Senate
- In office 1 March 1934 – 24 November 1940

Member of the Chamber of Deputies
- In office 1921–1934

Podestà of Manciano
- In office 1926–1938

Mayor of Manciano
- In office 1910–1919

Personal details
- Born: 7 August 1877 Manciano, Province of Grosseto, Kingdom of Italy
- Died: 24 November 1940 (aged 63) Manciano, Province of Grosseto, Kingdom of Italy
- Profession: Lawyer

Gino Giuseppe Aldi Mai (7 August 1877 – 24 November 1940) was an Italian lawyer and politician who served in the Chamber of Deputies and Senate of the Kingdom of Italy.

== Life and career ==
Aldi Mai was born in Manciano, province of Grosseto, and graduated in law in Rome, practicing as a lawyer in his hometown. He served in World War I, earning a merit cross. After the war, he became active in local politics as mayor of Manciano from 1910. In 1919, he was elected at the Grosseto City Council and appointed municipal assessor. On 29 March 1920, he became president of the Agrarian Association of Grosseto.

A conservative, Aldi Mai was elected to the Chamber of Deputies in 1921 on an agrarian-liberal list that merged into the National Fascist Party in 1922. He was re-elected in 1924 and appointed again in 1929, remaining in the Chamber until 1934, when he was appointed Senator. He served as podestà of Manciano from 1926 to 1938.

== Sources ==
- Dominici, Franco; Antonini, Silvio (2025). Gino Aldi Mai. Il candidato agrario. Arcidosso: Effigi.
- Galimi, Valeria, ed. (2018). Il fascismo a Grosseto. Figure e articolazioni del potere in provincia (1922-1938). Arcidosso: Effigi.
