= Sepp Kerschbaumer =

Tyrolean activist

- Born: 9 November 1913; Frangart, County of Tyrol, Austria-Hungary
- Died: 7 December 1964 (aged 51); Verona, Veneto, Italy
- Occupations: Merchant, Separatist
- Known for: founding the South Tyrolean Liberation Committee and organising the Night of Fire

Sepp Kerschbaumer (9 November 1913 – 7 December 1964) was a Tyrolean activist and member of the South Tyrolean Liberation Committee (Befreiungsausschuss Südtirol (BAS)), which campaigned for the break-away of South Tyrol from Italy. In 1961, the BAS staged the so-called Feuernacht (Night of Fire), the destruction of several dozen electricity pylons, which escalated the South Tyrol conflict. The Italian state viewed the BAS as a terrorist and separatist organization, while large parts of the South Tyroleans regarded them as freedom fighters.

== Early life ==
Sepp Kerschbaumer was the son of the merchant Josef Kerschbaumer and his wife Luise of Aldein, and born in the village of Frangart, which today is a frazione of Eppan. Kerschbaumer's father was killed on the Dolomite Front in World War I when he was four, followed by the death of his mother when he was nine.

After his education in Bolzano and Neustift Monastery, he completed the commercial preparatory school in Brixen in 1927. In 1933 he was conscripted into military service. In late 1934 Kerschbaumer was banished for two years because of participation in a forbidden political meeting. After Benito Mussolini pardoned him in late 1935, he returned to South Tyrol. At this point, he was put in charge of his parents' grocery business by his guardian.

== Politics ==
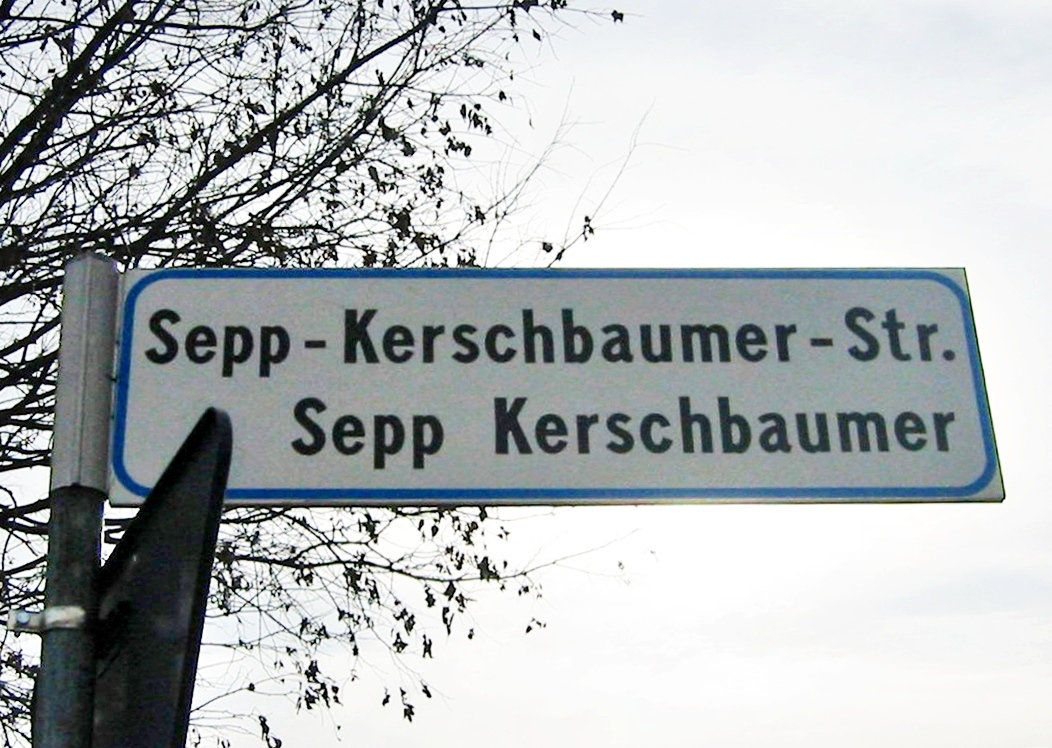
Street named after Sepp Kerschbaumer in Eppan an der Weinstraße

Fascist Italy had begun a process of Italianization of South Tyrol, a predominantly German-speaking area gained by Italy after World War I. Under the South Tyrol Option Agreement (1939), Kerschbaumer chose to migrate to Nazi Germany. But he later realized that no assistance could be expected from Germany. After World War II he joined the South Tyrolean People's Party and dedicated himself to local politics. He became local chairman of the party and local council head of Frangart.

At the start of the 1950s, he became frustrated at what he felt was the too conciliatory attitude of the SVP. At a large demonstration on 17 November 1957, Kerschbaumer distributed an anonymous leaflet demanding "a free South Tyrol". From then on he began to found and build the South Tyrolean Liberation Committee (BAS), which was at first limited to distributing leaflets and symbolic actions, such as the display of the then forbidden flag of South Tyrol. On 12 June 1961, the BAS organized the destruction by explosives of 37 electricity pylons supplying power to the industrial zone of Bolzano, later known as the Night of Fire (Feuernacht).

== Incarceration and death ==
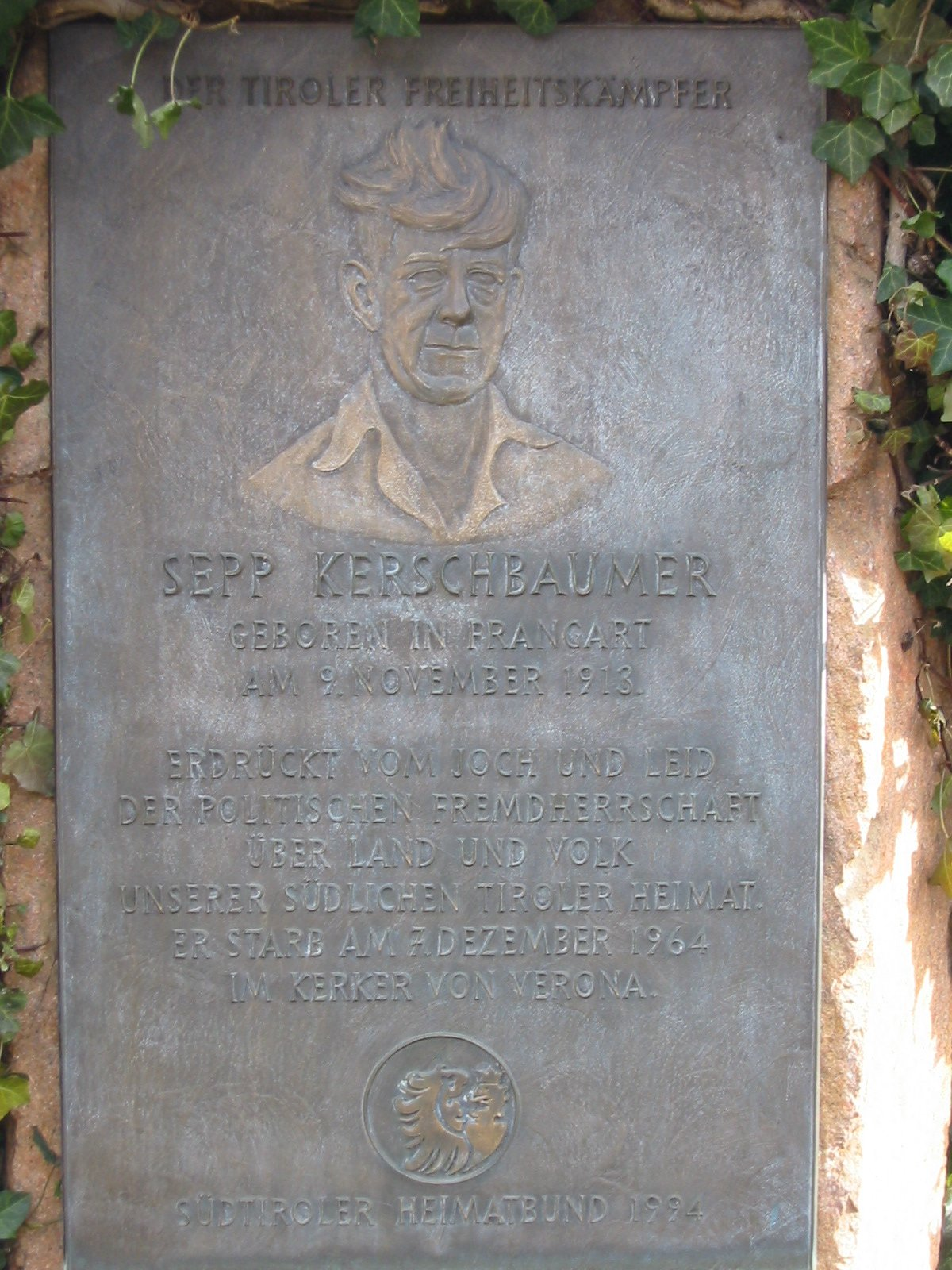
The memorial marker for Sepp Kerschbaumer

In the aftermath of the Feuernacht, Sepp Kerschbaumer was arrested and allegedly tortured by police. The rumored mistreatment of Kerschbaumer may have contributed to further escalation of events. Being the leading member of BAS, Sepp Kerschbaumer was sentenced to fifteen years and eleven months on 16 July 1964, for organizing the bombing. On 7 December 1964 he died in prison in Verona of a heart attack. More than 15,000 inhabitants attended the funeral on 9 December 1964, about 5% of the whole population then.

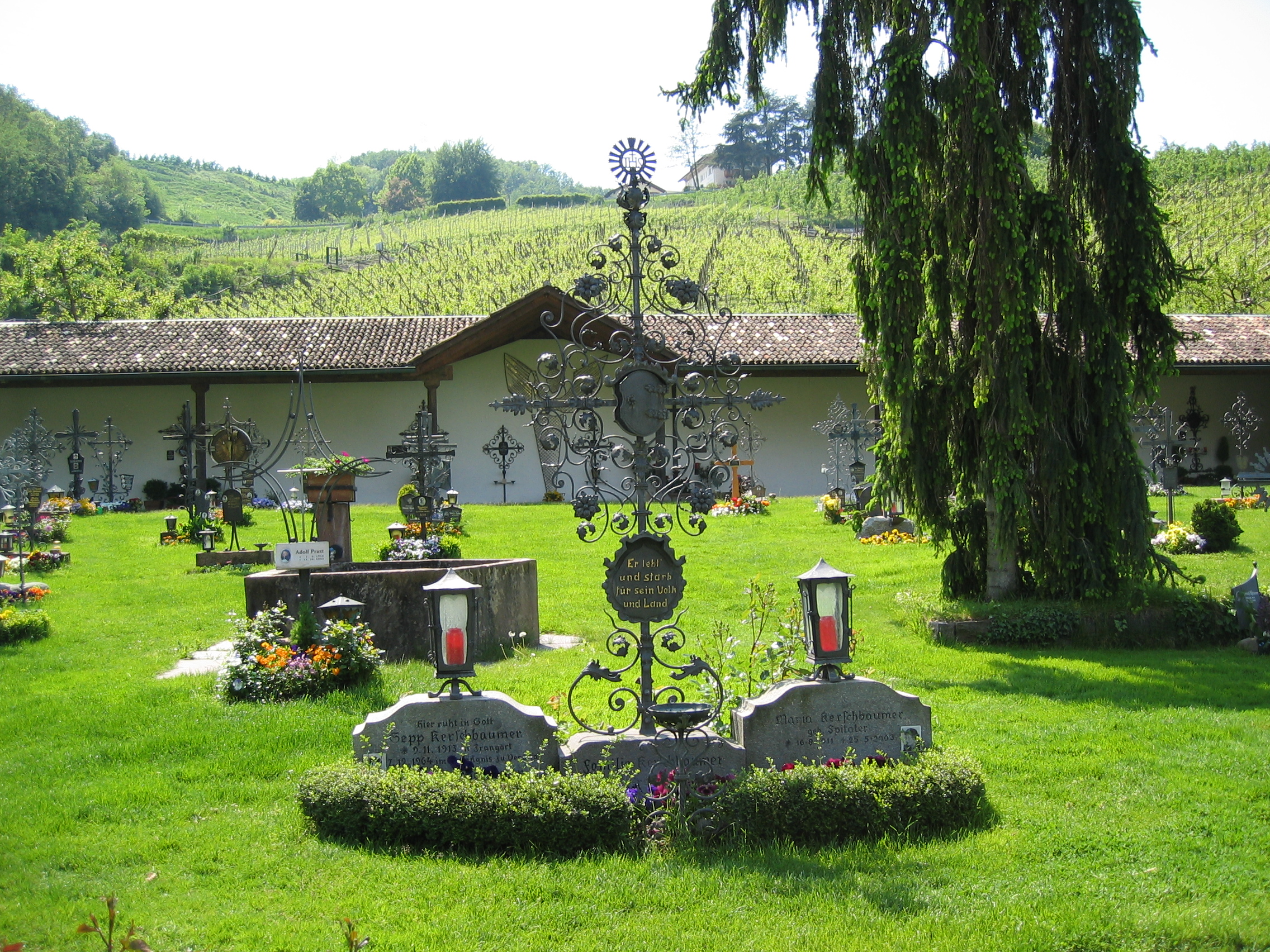
The last resting place of Sepp Kerschbaumer in Frangart

== Personal life ==
Kerschbaumer was a deeply devout Catholic and participated daily in holy mass in Bolzano; while in prison, he often prayed the rosary.

On 29 April 1936, he married Maria Sancheti from Bolzano. The couple had six children.
