= Milan police headquarters bombing =

1973 attack in Lombardy, Italy

Milan police headquarters bombing attentato alla questura di Milano
- Part of Years of Lead
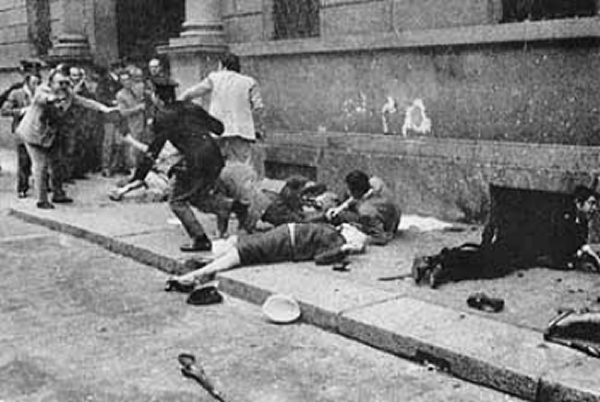
- Some victims of the bombing
- Location: 45.472997°N 9.192159°E; Milan, Lombardy, Italy
- Date: 17 May 1973; 11am
- Attack type: Bombing
- Weapon: hand-grenade
- Deaths: 4
- Injuries: 45
- Perpetrator: New Order

At 11am on 17 May 1973, a hand grenade was thrown at Milan's police headquarters in Lombardy, Italy. It happened during a memorial ceremony there for police officer Luigi Calabresi, who had been shot dead in Milan a year earlier. Four civilians were killed by the blast and 45 other people were injured.

The attacker was Gianfranco Bertoli (30 April 1933 – 17 December 2000). Although Bertoli self-identified as an anarchist, he was later identified to be a long time informant for the Italian military intelligence service and he had long maintained links with various anti‐communist and neo‐fascist organizations, such as New Order, linked to the Operation Gladio stay behind network as part of the strategy of tension. He was arrested at the scene and in 1975 was convicted in relation to the attack and sentenced to life imprisonment. The attack was denounced by various anarchist organizations including Italian Anarchist Federation in a press release almost instantly.
