= Malga Sasso barracks bombing =

1966 bombing in Italy

Malga Sasso bombing
- Part of South Tyrol insurgency
- Location: 46°59′49″N 11°29′29″E; Malga Sasso-Steinalm; Province of Bolzano; Italy
- Date: 9 September 1966; 11:30 am
- Target: Guardia di Finanza
- Attack type: Time bombing
- Weapons: IED hand grenades
- Deaths: 3 guards
- Injuries: 4 guards
- Perpetrator: South Tyrolean Liberation Committee

The Malga Sasso bombing (Italian: Strage di Malga Sasso, German: Anschlag auf der Steinalm) was a major bomb attack on an Italian Guardia di Finanza outpost not far from the Brennero pass, in the Province of Bolzano, near the border with Austria. The attack was carried out on 9 September 1966 by members of the South Tyrolean Liberation Committee (BAS), a paramilitary organization seeking the independence of German-speaking South Tyrol from Italy. Two guards were killed by the blast on the spot, while a third died of wounds several days later. Three others were seriously injured. The separatist militants Alois Larch, Alois Rainer and Richard Kofler were prosecuted and sentenced by the Italian Justice in 1976.

== Background ==
The tensions between the German-speaking population of South Tyrol and the Italian minority in the area were growing up since the end of World War II. The situation eventually ended up in violence, and on 12 June 1961, the BAS, established in 1957, blew up 37 electricity pylons supplying power to the industrial zone of Bolzano, later known as the "Night of Fire" (Feuernacht). From 1964 to 1966 the organisation was responsible for a series of bombings and shootings, aimed particularly at Italian security forces.

== The bombing ==
Malga Sasso, also known by its original German toponym, Steinalm, is a malga or pasture 4.5 km south of Brennero, at 1,800 meters over the sea level, on the border with Austria. At the time of the bombing, the main building in the area was a barracks manned by the Compagnia di Frontiera del Brennero (Brenner Border Company), belonging to the Guardia di Finanza. The commander of the company was Deputy Brigadier Eriberto Volgger, a German-speaking Italian born in Bolzano.

In the morning of 9 September 1966, Volgger and six comrades were at work in the barrack's office when, at approximately 11:30 am, a 25-kg explosive device attached to a daisy-chain of hand grenades went off inside the north-western wing of the building. The time-bomb had been thrown down a chimney, one of the four of the barracks. Other reports said that the detonation of the time device ignited a cache of hand grenades already stored in the station's ammunition dump. The roof and the external wall of the building in the area of the explosion collapsed, while the blast ripped through the division between the office and the kitchen, killing Volgger and one of his men, Finanziero Martino Cossu, instantly, and wounding another five. One of them, Lieutenant Franco Petrucci, succumbed to his wounds on 23 September. The explosion threw the railing 18 meters out, and debris was found as far as 50 meters around the wrecked barracks.

The base was never rebuilt, and its ruins still stand as of 2019.

== Trial and convictions ==
Four members of the BAS were initially charged with the bomb attack. Georg Klotz, Richard Kofler, Alois Larch and Alois Rainer were acquitted prima facie on 17 January 1969 by a court at Milan. A second instance tribunal found three of them guilty on 12 February 1976. Rainer got 24 years in prison, while the others received lesser terms. Georg Klotz had died from a myocardial infarction in Austria only a month before.

A stone plaque was erected at the site of the bombing on 9 September 2001 as a permanent memorial to the fallen guards.

The three servicemen killed in the attack were awarded the Medal of Remembrance to the victims of terrorism in 2010 and the Medaglia d'Oro al Merito Civile in 2013.

== See also ==
- Cima Vallona ambush
