= South Tyrolean Liberation Committee =

Secessionist liberation group in South Tyrol

The South Tyrolean Liberation Committee (German: Befreiungsausschuss Südtirol, abbreviated BAS) was an underground secessionist organisation founded by Sepp Kerschbaumer and several combatants including Georg Klotz in the mid-1950s which aimed to achieve the right for self-determination for South Tyrol and the related secession from Italy via bomb attacks.

== History ==
The organisation's history can be divided into two stages. In the first phase, from 1956 until 1961, the activists focussed on symbolic targets such as relics of the fascist regime, trying to avoid physical injuries of human beings. On 12 June 1961, the BAS organized the bombing of 37 electricity pylons supplying power to the industrial zone of Bolzano, later known as the Night of Fire (Feuernacht).

After the subsequent imprisonment of almost all leading members, a second, more violent phase began. This second phase was characterised by an increasing infiltration of Austrian and German neo-Nazis and intensified secret service activities which culminated in several assassinations and ambushes on Italian security forces, with the 1967 attack on a security patrol at Cima Vallona being the most notorious.

With the progression of negotiations concerning South Tyrolean autonomy in the late 1960s, the BAS became less active.
