= Argo 16 =

Italian Air Force C-47 Dakota that crashed in 1973

Coordinates: 45°26′43″N 12°14′42″E

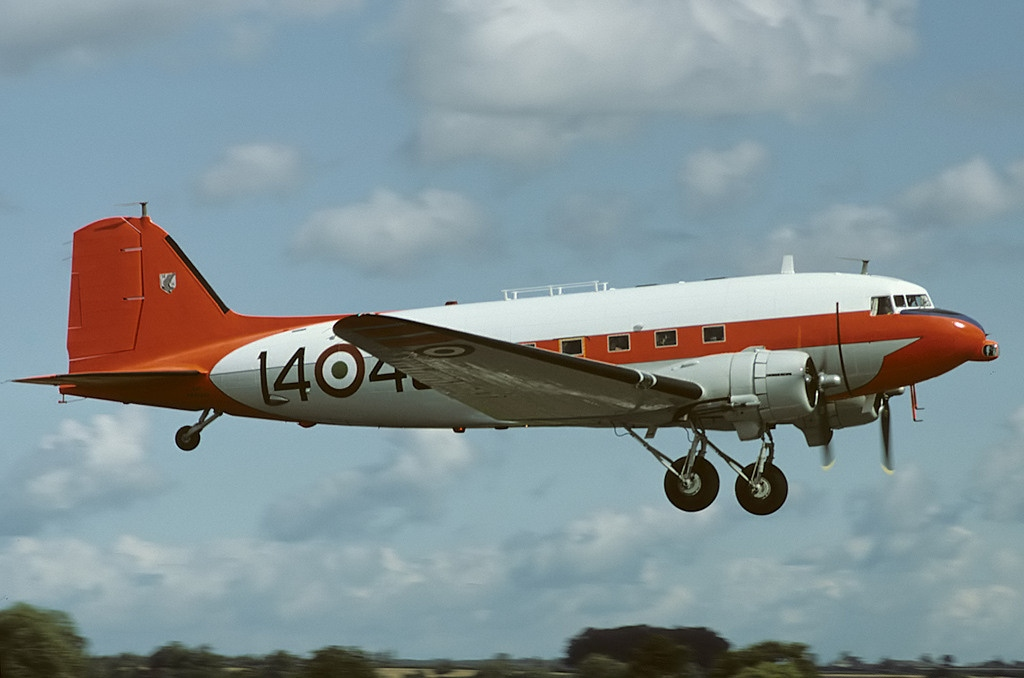
- An Italian Air Force Douglas C-47 similar to the aircraft involved

Occurrence
- Date: 23 November 1973
- Summary: Not confirmed
- Site: Marghera, Italy

Aircraft
- Aircraft type: Douglas C-47 Dakota
- Operator: Italian Air Force
- Registration: MM61832
- Flight origin: Libya
- Stopover: Malta
- Passengers: 0
- Crew: 4
- Fatalities: 4
- Survivors: 0

Argo 16 was the codename of an Italian Air Force C-47 Dakota aircraft, registration MM61832, used by 306th Group of the Flight Department of the General Staff (RVSM, then 31st Wing) of the Italian Air Force.

== Crash ==
On November 23, 1973, Argo 16 crashed near Porto Marghera shortly after taking off from Venice Airport, killing the crew, Colonel Anano Borreo, Lieutenant Colonel Mario Grande, Engineer Aldo Schiavone and Radio Operator Francesco Bernardini. The plane crashed into a building belonging to the Data Processing Center of the Montedison oil complex, with the wreckage hitting the parking lot, the research center and the administrative offices of Montefibre, but without causing any further casualties.

Shortly after boarding the plane and before taking off, SID lieutenant Giuseppe Cismondi received a radio communication ordering the plane to head toward the NATO base in Aviano. Cismondi was then forced to disembark from the plane. Argo 16 then took off for Aviano, but after a few minutes the latter crashed into the Montefibre factory in Porto Marghera.

== Usage ==
Admiral Fulvio Martini declared during a hearing at the Parliamentary Commission of Inquiry on terrorism in Italy that the code name of the plane Argo 16, was named for the giant mythological all-seeing Argus Panoptes. The aeroplane conducted electronic observation missions in the Adriatic Sea for the Secret Service against the Yugoslavian radar network. According to Luigi, Borreo`s father, the commander of the crew of the Argo 16, Anano Borreo, feared for his life: he was aware that his work placed him at the centre of delicate and dangerous situations.

Some journalistic sources claimed that the plane with registration MM61832 was also used by Gladio for the transport of men to the Centro Addestramento Guastatori, a training base located in Capo Marrargiu, Sardinia, and for the transport of NASCO weapons to secret depots of the "gladiators".

The plane was also used to accompany a group of Arab terrorists back to Tripoli who were blocked on 5 September 1973 while they were preparing to launch a missile from a terrace in Ostia at an Israeli airline jet.

=== Retaliation thesis for the lodo Moro ===
The liberation of the Arabs was requested by the PLO headed by Yasser Arafat, in exchange for that release the PLO would do its utmost not to carry out any other act of terrorism on Italian soil, with a temporary commitment made directly with the Foreign Minister in the context of the so-called patto Moro or lodo Moro.

According to information given during a hearing filed with the Italian Senate on January 20, 2009, the existence of this pact with its validity of over a decade was confirmed by Bassam Abu Sharif, the "historical" leader of the Popular Front for the Liberation of Palestine, by the lawyer Giovanni Pellegrino, by the senator Francesco Cossiga and by the judge Rosario Priore (who was the investigator of the proceedings relating to the kidnapping of Aldo Moro).

Although it is a fact that Italian foreign policy under the regency of Aldo Moro at the Farnesina followed a more pro-Arab direction, the timing of the replacement of the "lodo De Gasperi " with the "lodo Moro ", in relations with the world of Middle Eastern intelligence, does not fully match the story of the end of the Argo 16 plane. Since many sources place the commitment undertaken by Moro following the Fiumicino massacre (1973), it would not have been possible to react in November to an event that had yet to happen; therefore, other sources maintain that the commitment was decided before, and that it was only "stipulated" formally after the 1973 Fiumicino massacre.

== Causes ==
In 1999 the Corte d'assise of the Venice Tribunal declared that the cause had to be attributed to an accident, effectively excluding any intervention by the Mossad, but other theories on the causes of the accident have also been put forward without however providing concrete and adequate evidence.

During an episode of an Italian television program aired in 1990 and focused on the Argo 16 case, General Geraldo Serravalle, head of Gladio from 1971 to 1974, declared that although there is a widespread opinion that the cause was sabotage by the Israeli secret services, it was probable that the explosion was caused by the gladiators themselves who refused to hand over their weapons. Giovanni Pellegrino, former president of the italian commissione stragi, was of the same opinion and believed that the cause should be sought based on the use made of the plane by Gladio.

In 2000 General Gianadelio Maletti (SID) stated during an interview with a journalist of the italian newspaper la Repubblica that the plane was returning from Libya after having released five palestinians involved in a failed attack in Ostia and arrested and that an "unfortunate stop" in Malta officially confirmed to the israeli secret services what was happening. He also declared that he had been contacted by Asa Leven the then head of the israeli secret services station in Rome before that operation and that he was aware of the italian government's intentions he proposed to collaborate to kidnap the five and extradite them to Jerusalem but he said "nothing will be done" and "argo 16 crashes".

== Trial ==
In March 1997, Italian judge Carlo Mastelloni incriminated 22 Italian Air Force officers on charges of suppression, falsification and subtraction of documents concerning state security. In his opinion, in fact, "those who over the years have been involved in the investigation have systematically concealed, falsified or destroyed every element that could lead to the right path". Among those accused of the massacre were Zvi Zamir, former head of the Mossad, and Asa Leven, former head of the Mossad in Italy.

Finally, 9 officers, officials and consultants of the SID and SISMI were sent to trial. The Italian Public prosecutor Remo Smitti asked for an eight-year sentence for Maletti, Viezzer and Lehmann, an acquittal for all the others and an acquittal for Zvi Zamir, considered by Mastelloni to be the instigator of the sabotage. The defense lawyers managed to dismantle all the charges and on December 16, 1999 the judges concluded the trial by establishing that the plane crashed due to a failure or pilot error.
