= Cima Vallona ambush =

1967 bombing in Italy

- Part of South Tyrol insurgency
- Location: 46°38′57.09″N 12°32′42.56″E; Cima Vallona, Province of Belluno, Italy
- Date: 25 June 1967; 5:30 am (first incident)
- Target: Italian security forces
- Attack type: Trip-wire bombing
- Weapons: Land mine IED
- Deaths: 3 Carabinieri; 1 Alpino
- Injuries: 1 Carabiniere
- Perpetrator: South Tyrolean Liberation Committee

The Cima Vallona ambush (Italian: Strage di Cima Vallona) was a double improvised explosive device attack on Italian security forces at Cima Vallona, Provincia di Belluno. The ambush was carried out on 26 June 1967 by members of the South Tyrolean Liberation Committee, a paramilitary organization seeking the independence of German-speaking South Tyrol from Italy. The first explosion, involving the use of a landmine, struck a patrol of Alpini from the Italian Army, called in after the bombing of an electricity pylon. A second patrol, this time composed by Carabinieri, bore the full blast of a booby-trap while searching the area of the previous attack. One Alpini and three Carabinieri were killed, while a fourth Carabiniere survived with serious injuries.

== Background ==
The annexation of South Tyrol after WWI saw a large German-speaking population within the redrawn boundaries of Italy, in the newly established province of Belluno. The Fascist regime later began a process of Italianization of South Tyrol, which triggered the passive resistance of the local population. The good relations between Fascist Italy and Nazi Germany resulted in the South Tyrol Option Agreement (1939), which gave the local residents the choice between emigration to Germany or full integration with Italy. A majority opted for Germany, but after a brief period of German occupation from 1943 to 1945, during WWII, most of the emigrants returned to Italy. Post-war relations between the German-speaking and the Italian communities proved tense, if not hostile, according to Giulio Andreotti, then president of the Italian Bureau of Border Issues.

It is in this context, in 1957, that a local chairman of the South Tyrolean People's Party and local council head of Frangart, Sepp Kerschbaumer, became disenchanted with his party attitude toward Italianization and founded the "South Tyrolean Liberation Committee" (Befreiungsausschuss Südtirol), which began a progressive campaign of confrontation with Italian authorities, initially limited to the distribution of leaflets or the display of the banned flag of Tyrol. The organization eventually resorted to violence; on 12 June 1961, the BAS organized the destruction by explosives of 37 electricity pylons supplying power to the industrial zone of Bolzano, later known as the Night of Fire (Feuernacht). One power plant was also severely damaged, while eight power plants shut down.

== The attack ==
=== First explosions ===
On 25 June 1967, at 03.40 am, a sentry watching the outpost of Forcella Dignas, near San Pietro di Cadore, heard a powerful blast from the direction of Cima Vallona, a pass in the Alps 2,532 meters above sea level. Apparently, an explosive device had toppled an electricity pylon. The serviceman radioed to his superiors at Santo Stefano di Cadore, who sent in a mobile patrol consisting of Alpini, Finanzieri and ammunition technicians. At 5:30 am, when the group arrived at 600 meters from the site of the explosion, snow piles forced them to get out from their off-road vehicles. The patrol, led by Captain Alamari, approached the collapsed pylon on foot. When the men were only 70 meters from the place, radio operator Armando Piva, an Alpino of the "Val Cismon" battalion, stepped on an explosive device hidden in a gravel pile. The perpetrators had spread anti-personnel mines on an area where the patrol would be required to access. Piva was maimed by the blast, and died of wounds several hours later.

=== Second patrol ===
A four-men team detached from the Compagnia Speciale Antiterrorismo, a provisional mixed unit drawn from the Carabinieri Parachute Battalion and the Saboteurs Parachute Battalion, was flown in from San Giacomo di Bolzano on an AB 204 helicopter of the 4th General Purpose Helicopters Unit. The members of the group, two officers and two NCOs, were all paratroopers and the two NCOs were both bomb disposal specialists. The mission of this team was to collect evidence to trace the individuals behind the attack. The helicopter landed the paratroopers at the base of the peak, several hundred meters from the mined area, that they reached on foot through a narrow trail. On their way back, some 400 meters from the landing area, a trip-wire bomb went off, killing Carabinieri Captain Francesco Gentile, Saboteurs 2nd Lieutenant Mario Di Lecce and Saboteurs Sergeant Olivo Dordi. The fourth man, Saboteurs Sergeant Major Marcello Fagnani, received 40 shrapnel wounds, but survived. According to Italian authorities, the BAS group who set up the ambush departed from Obertilliach, in the Austrian Tyrol, and reached Cima Vallona from a clandestine mountain path.

== Aftermath ==
Five members of the BAS were indicted for the killings: Norbert Burger, Peter Kienesberger, Erhard Hartung, Egon Kufner (a sergeant in the Austrian Army) and Hans Christian Genck. Burger, Kienesberger and Hartung were sentenced to life imprisonment, while Kufner and Genck received 24 and 17 years in jail, respectively. All of them were sentenced by a court in Florence in absentia, after fleeing to Austria. Austrian authorities, under pressure from the Italian government, brought Kienesberger, Hartung and Kufner to trial, but eventually found them not guilty for lack of evidence.

Captain Gentile was awarded the Gold Medal of Military Valour, while his subordinates were decorated with the Silver Medal of Military Valour. In 2010, all the personnel involved received the Medal of Remembrance to the victims of terrorism.

== See also ==
- Malga Sasso barracks bombing
