= 1990–91 NK Rijeka season =

Rijeka
1990–91 season
- Chairman: Želimir Gruičić, Darko Čargonja
- Manager: Vladimir Lukarić, Nikola Filipović, Mladen Vranković, Željko Mudrovičić
- First League: 15th
- Cup: Quarterfinal
- Top goalscorer: League: Fabijan Komljenović (9); All: Fabijan Komljenović (12)
- Highest home attendance: 4,245 vs (Socialist Federal Republic of Yugoslavia) Partizan (16 June 1991 - Yugoslav First League)
- Lowest home attendance: 285 vs (Socialist Federal Republic of Yugoslavia) Osijek (10 March 1991 - Yugoslav First League)
- Average home league attendance: 1,484

The 1990–91 season was the 45th season in Rijeka's history and their 29th season in the Yugoslav First League. Their 6th place finish in the 1989–90 season meant it was their 17th successive season playing in the Yugoslav First League. This was also the last season in which Croatian clubs participated in the Yugoslav league.

== Competitions ==
Competition	First match	Last match	Starting round	Final position	Record							
Competition	First match	Last match	Starting round	Final position	G	W	D	L	GF	GA	GD	Win %
Yugoslav First League	5 August 1990	16 June 1991	Matchday 1	15th	36	13	10	13	33	25	+8	36.11
Yugoslav Cup	8 August 1990	21 November 1990	First round	Quarterfinal	5	1	2	2	5	5	+0	20.00
Total					41	14	12	15	38	30	+8	34.15

=== Yugoslav First League ===
==== Classification ====
Pos	Team	Pld	W	PKW	PKL	L	GF	GA	GD	Pts
13	Zemun	36	12	6	4	14	40	53	−13	30
14	Olimpija (Note: After the season, Croatian and Slovenian clubs left the Yugoslav federation and formed their own leagues. Dinamo Zagreb, Hajduk Split, Osijek and Rijeka joined 1992 Prva HNL, while Olimpija joined 1991–92 Slovenian PrvaLiga.)	36	14	2	1	19	41	59	−18	30
15	Rijeka	36	13	3	7	13	33	25	+8	29
16	Željezničar	36	11	7	6	12	35	41	−6	29
17	Budućnost	36	13	2	4	17	43	48	−5	28

Source: rsssf.org
Rules for classification: 1) points; 2) goal difference; 3) number of goals scored.

==== Results summary ====
Overall								Home						Away					
Pld	W	D	L	GF	GA	GD	Pts	W	D	L	GF	GA	GD	W	D	L	GF	GA	GD
36	13	10	13	33	25	+8	49	10	6	2	23	3	+20	3	4	11	10	22	−12

==== Results by round ====
Round	1	2	3	4	5	6	7	8	9	10	11	12	13	14	15	16	17	18	19	20	21	22	23	24	25	26	27	28	29	30	31	32	33	34	35	36
Ground	H	H	A	H	A	H	A	H	A	H	A	H	A	H	A	H	H	A	A	A	H	A	H	A	H	A	H	A	H	A	H	A	H	A	A	H
Result	L	D	L	W	D	W	L	D	W	W	L	D	L	W	L	W	D	W	D	L	W	L	D	W	L	L	D	L	W	L	W	L	W	D	D	W
Position	14	14	18	12	12	10	11	12	9	7	9	11	12	11	14	11	13	7	9	13	11	13	15	11	14	15	15	16	14	15	15	16	16	16	17	15

Source: Competitive matches
A = Away; H = Home; W = Win; D = Draw; L = Loss

== Matches ==
=== First League ===
Round	Date	Venue	Opponent	Score	Attendance^{1}	Rijeka Scorers
1	5 Aug	H	Zemun	0 – 1	1,346	
2	19 Aug	H	Dinamo Zagreb	0 – 0 (3–1 p)	3,301	
3	26 Aug	A	Osijek	0 – 2	668	
4	2 Sep	H	Sarajevo	2 – 0	1,089	Komljenović, Punišić
5	16 Sep	A	Hajduk Split	1 – 1 (6–5 p)	6,544	Komljenović
6	23 Sep	H	Spartak Subotica	3 – 0	1,030	Komljenović, Punišić, Belajić
7	26 Sep	A	Sloboda	0 – 1	544	
8	29 Sep	H	Red Star	0 – 0 (1–3 p)	3,855	
9	6 Oct	A	Rad	1 – 0	168	Punišić
10	14 Oct	H	Proleter Zrenjanin	3 – 0	580	Stipić, Skočić, Ekmeščić
11	21 Oct	A	Radnički Niš	0 – 1	758	
12	4 Nov	H	Željezničar	1 – 1 (1–4 p)	760	Komljenović
13	18 Nov	A	Olimpija	1 – 2	1,929	Komljenović
14	25 Nov	H	Budućnost	1 – 0	660	Kurtović
15	2 Dec	A	Velež	0 – 1	1,175	
16	5 Dec	H	Vojvodina	3 – 0	1,000	Vulić (2), Stipić
17	9 Dec	H	Borac Banja Luka	0 – 0 (9–10 p)	870	
18	16 Dec	A	Partizan	2 – 1	2,295	Rubčić, Komljenović
19	16 Feb	A	Zemun	0 – 0 (1–3 p)	503	
20	3 Mar	A	Dinamo Zagreb	1 – 3	7,837	Punišić
21	10 Mar	H	Osijek	2 – 0	285	Punišić (p), Nestorović
22	17 Mar	A	Sarajevo	0 – 1	892	
23	23 Mar	H	Hajduk Split	0 – 0 (1–3 p)	3,847	
24	31 Mar	A	Spartak Subotica	1 – 0	580	Stipić
25	7 Apr	H	Sloboda	0 – 1	720	
26	14 Apr	A	Red Star	1 – 2	9,126	Nestorović
27	21 Apr	H	Rad	0 – 0 (6–5 p)	688	
28	27 Apr	A	Proleter Zrenjanin	1 – 2	732	Komljenović
29	5 May	H	Radnički Niš	3 – 0	680	Punišić, Florijančič, Komljenović
30	11 May	A	Željezničar	0 – 2	1,500	
31	19 May	H	Olimpija	1 – 0	881	Florijančič
32	26 May	A	Budućnost	0 – 2	319	
33	2 Jun	H	Velež	1 – 0	867	Komljenović
34	5 Jun	A	Vojvodina	1 – 1 (2–4 p)	1,000	Skočić
35	9 Jun	A	Borac Banja Luka	0 – 0 (3–4 p)	2,307	
36	16 Jun	H	Partizan	3 – 0	4,245	Florijančič (2), Paliska

Source: rsssf.com

=== Yugoslav Cup ===
Round	Date	Venue	Opponent	Score	Rijeka Scorers
R1	8 Aug	A	Zadar	0 – 0 (4–2 p)	
R2	15 Aug	A	Sloboda	0 – 2	
R2	23 Aug	H	Sloboda	4 – 1	Komljenović (2), Vulić, Romić
QF	10 Oct	H	Hajduk Split	0 – 1	
QF	21 Nov	AR	Hajduk Split	1 – 1	Komljenović

Source: rsssf.com

=== Squad statistics ===
Competitive matches only.
Appearances in brackets indicate numbers of times the player came on as a substitute.

Name	Apps	Goals	Apps	Goals	Apps	Goals
Name	League		Cup		Total	
(Socialist Federal Republic of Yugoslavia) Tonči Gabrić	35 (0)	0	3 (0)	0	38 (0)	0
(Socialist Federal Republic of Yugoslavia) Branko Dragutinović	33 (0)	0	5 (0)	0	38 (0)	0
(Socialist Federal Republic of Yugoslavia) Dušan Kljajić	35 (0)	0	5 (0)	0	40 (0)	0
(Socialist Federal Republic of Yugoslavia) Miro Stipić	29 (0)	3	5 (0)	0	34 (0)	3
(Socialist Federal Republic of Yugoslavia) Fabijan Komljenović	35 (0)	9	5 (0)	3	40 (0)	12
(Socialist Federal Republic of Yugoslavia) Dragan Punišić	31 (0)	6	5 (0)	0	36 (0)	6
(Socialist Federal Republic of Yugoslavia) Ivan Kurtović	23 (1)	1	3 (1)	0	26 (2)	1
(Socialist Federal Republic of Yugoslavia) Dubravko Pavličić	26 (0)	0	5 (0)	0	31 (0)	0
(Socialist Federal Republic of Yugoslavia) Stojan Belajić	28 (1)	1	2 (1)	0	30 (2)	1
(Socialist Federal Republic of Yugoslavia) Darko Nestorović	17 (7)	2	2 (2)	0	19 (9)	2
(Socialist Federal Republic of Yugoslavia) Kazimir Vulić	28 (1)	2	3 (0)	1	31 (1)	3
(Socialist Federal Republic of Yugoslavia) Matjaž Florijančič	18 (0)	4	0 (0)	0	18 (0)	4
(Socialist Federal Republic of Yugoslavia) Dragan Skočić	12 (7)	2	2 (2)	0	14 (9)	2
(Socialist Federal Republic of Yugoslavia) Mladen Romić	12 (0)	0	4 (0)	1	16 (0)	1
(Socialist Federal Republic of Yugoslavia) Robert Rubčić	9 (1)	1	1 (0)	0	10 (1)	1
(Socialist Federal Republic of Yugoslavia) Rade Vešović	6 (0)	0	2 (0)	0	8 (0)	0
(Socialist Federal Republic of Yugoslavia) Roberto Paliska	7 (0)	1	0 (0)	0	7 (0)	1
(Socialist Federal Republic of Yugoslavia) Fadil Muriqi	3 (2)	0	0 (0)	0	3 (2)	0
(Socialist Federal Republic of Yugoslavia) Valdi Šumberac	2 (10)	0	0 (1)	0	2 (11)	0
(Socialist Federal Republic of Yugoslavia) Boris Ekmeščić	1 (6)	1	1 (1)	0	2 (7)	0
(Socialist Federal Republic of Yugoslavia) Dean Ljubančić	3 (11)	0	0 (0)	0	3 (11)	0
(Socialist Federal Republic of Yugoslavia) Josip Bogdanović	1 (7)	0	0 (0)	0	1 (7)	0
(Socialist Federal Republic of Yugoslavia) Daniel Šarić	1 (2)	0	0 (1)	0	1 (3)	0
(Socialist Federal Republic of Yugoslavia) Mladen Žganjer	1 (1)	0	2 (0)	0	3 (1)	0
(Socialist Federal Republic of Yugoslavia) Zoran Ban	0 (1)	0	0 (0)	0	0 (1)	0

== Notes ==
1. Data for league attendance in most cases reflects the number of sold tickets and may not be indicative of the actual attendance.

== See also ==
- 1990–91 Yugoslav First League
- 1990–91 Yugoslav Cup
