= 1989–90 NK Rijeka season =

Rijeka
1989–90 season
- Chairman: Želimir Gruičić
- Manager: Vladimir Lukarić
- First League: 6th
- Cup: Round 2
- Top goalscorer: League: Zoran Vujčić (9); All: Zoran Vujčić (9)
- Highest home attendance: 7,038 vs (Socialist Federal Republic of Yugoslavia) Dinamo Zagreb (15 April 1990 - Yugoslav First League)
- Lowest home attendance: 685 vs (Socialist Federal Republic of Yugoslavia) Osijek (16 May 1990 - Yugoslav First League)
- Average home league attendance: 2,555

The 1989–90 season was the 44th season in Rijeka's history and their 28th season in the Yugoslav First League. Their 10th place finish in the 1988–89 season meant it was their 16th successive season in the Yugoslav First League.

== Competitions ==
Competition	First match	Last match	Starting round	Final position	Record							
Competition	First match	Last match	Starting round	Final position	G	W	D	L	GF	GA	GD	Win %
Yugoslav First League	30 July 1989	16 May 1990	Matchday 1	6th	34	14	6	14	29	35	−6	41.18
Yugoslav Cup	2 August 1989	16 August 1989	First round	Second round	3	2	0	1	4	5	−1	66.67
Total					37	16	6	15	33	40	−7	43.24

=== Yugoslav First League ===
==== Classification ====
Pos	Team	Pld	W	PKW	PKL	L	GF	GA	GD	Pts	Qualification or relegation
4	Partizan	34	18	1	3	12	51	42	+9	37	Qualification for UEFA Cup first round
5	Rad	34	16	4	2	12	41	31	+10	36	
6	Rijeka	34	14	5	1	14	29	35	−6	33	
7	Željezničar	34	14	4	2	14	37	40	−3	32	
8	Olimpija	34	14	2	4	14	49	40	+9	30	Qualification for Intertoto Cup

Source: rsssf.org
Rules for classification: 1) points; 2) goal difference; 3) number of goals scored.

==== Results summary ====
Overall								Home						Away					
Pld	W	D	L	GF	GA	GD	Pts	W	D	L	GF	GA	GD	W	D	L	GF	GA	GD
34	14	6	14	29	35	−6	48	11	3	3	20	7	+13	3	3	11	9	28	−19

==== Results by round ====
Round	1	2	3	4	5	6	7	8	9	10	11	12	13	14	15	16	17	18	19	20	21	22	23	24	25	26	27	28	29	30	31	32	33	34
Ground	H	A	H	A	H	H	A	H	A	H	A	H	A	H	A	H	A	A	H	A	H	A	A	H	A	H	A	H	A	H	A	H	A	H
Result	W	W	W	L	W	D	L	L	L	L	D	W	L	W	D	W	W	D	L	L	W	L	L	W	L	D	L	D	W	W	L	W	L	W
Position	8	3	1	4	2	2	2	6	7	12	13	12	13	11	11	6	4	4	6	8	5	7	10	7	10	8	11	9	8	7	8	6	7	6

Source: Competitive matches
A = Away; H = Home; W = Win; D = Draw; L = Loss

== Matches ==
=== First League ===
Round	Date	Venue	Opponent	Score	Attendance^{1}	Rijeka Scorers
1	30 Jul	H	Hajduk Split	1 – 0	6,277	Paliska
2	6 Aug	A	Partizan	1 – 0	8,075	Vujčić
3	13 Aug	H	Radnički Niš	2 – 0	2,624	Vujčić (2)
4	20 Aug	A	Borac Banja Luka	1 – 2	7,851	Rubčić
5	27 Aug	H	Velež	1 – 0	2,357	o.g.
6	10 Sep	H	Budućnost	0 – 0 (5–4 p)	2,590	
7	17 Sep	A	Sarajevo	0 – 2	1,311	
8	23 Sep	H	Rad	0 – 1	1,766	
9	1 Oct	A	Olimpija	0 – 2	5,860	
10	7 Oct	H	Red Star	1 – 4	5,356	Romić
11	15 Oct	A	Dinamo Zagreb	1 – 1 (3–4 p)	8,123	Stipić
12	22 Oct	H	Spartak Subotica	3 – 0	1,340	Vujčić (2, 2p), Scoria
13	5 Nov	A	Sloboda	0 – 1	779	
14	12 Nov	H	Vojvodina	2 – 0	1,382	Vujčić (2, 1p)
15	19 Nov	A	Vardar	0 – 0 (5–4 p)	2,144	
16	26 Nov	H	Željezničar	1 – 0	1,189	Vulić
17	3 Dec	A	Osijek	1 – 0	528	Vulić
18	10 Dec	A	Hajduk Split	1 – 1 (6–5 p)	3,321	Vešović
19	17 Dec	H	Partizan	0 – 1	3,226	
20	18 Feb	A	Radnički Niš	0 – 3	2,440	
21	25 Feb	H	Borac Banja Luka	1 – 0	1,239	Beširević
22	4 Mar	A	Velež	2 – 3	2,467	Komljenović (2)
23	11 Mar	A	Budućnost	0 – 1	1,535	
24	18 Mar	H	Sarajevo	1 – 0	2,563	Kurtović
25	24 Mar	A	Rad	0 – 4	359	
26	1 Apr	H	Olimpija	0 – 0 (3–2 p)	1,485	
27	8 Apr	A	Red Star	0 – 1	6,177	
28	15 Apr	H	Dinamo Zagreb	1 – 1 (4–1 p)	7,038	Komljenović
29	22 Apr	A	Spartak Subotica	1 – 0	2,110	Pavličić
30	25 Apr	H	Sloboda	3 – 0	1,167	Komljenović, o.g., Vujčić
31	29 Apr	A	Vojvodina	0 – 2	832	
32	6 May	H	Vardar	2 – 0	1,151	Beširević, Vujčić (p)
33	13 May	A	Željezničar	1 – 4	982	Vulić
34	16 May	H	Osijek	1 – 0	685	Beširević

Source: rsssf.com

=== Yugoslav Cup ===
Round	Date	Venue	Opponent	Score	Rijeka Scorers
R1	2 Aug	A	Orijent	1 – 0	Beširević
R2	9 Aug	A	Vardar	0 – 3	
R2	16 Aug	H	Vardar	3 – 2	Beširević, o.g., Rubčić

Source: rsssf.com

=== Squad statistics ===
Competitive matches only.
Appearances in brackets indicate numbers of times the player came on as a substitute.

Name	Apps	Goals	Apps	Goals	Apps	Goals
Name	League		Cup		Total	
(Socialist Federal Republic of Yugoslavia) Tonči Gabrić	32 (0)	0	3 (0)	0	35 (0)	0
(Socialist Federal Republic of Yugoslavia) Mladen Romić	24 (2)	1	3 (0)	0	27 (2)	1
(Socialist Federal Republic of Yugoslavia) Branko Dragutinović	22 (1)	0	3 (0)	0	25 (1)	0
(Socialist Federal Republic of Yugoslavia) Saša Peršon	29 (0)	0	3 (0)	0	32 (0)	0
(Socialist Federal Republic of Yugoslavia) Roberto Paliska	23 (1)	1	2 (0)	0	25 (1)	1
(Socialist Federal Republic of Yugoslavia) Robert Rubčić	15 (1)	1	3 (0)	1	18 (1)	2
(Socialist Federal Republic of Yugoslavia) Dušan Kljajić	26 (0)	0	3 (0)	0	29 (0)	0
(Socialist Federal Republic of Yugoslavia) Fadil Muriqi	22 (0)	0	2 (0)	0	24 (0)	0
(Socialist Federal Republic of Yugoslavia) Zoran Vujčić	33 (0)	9	3 (0)	0	36 (0)	9
(Socialist Federal Republic of Yugoslavia) Kazimir Vulić	16 (6)	3	0 (0)	0	16 (6)	3
(Socialist Federal Republic of Yugoslavia) Rade Vešović	28 (1)	1	0 (2)	0	28 (3)	1
(Socialist Federal Republic of Yugoslavia) Suad Beširević	16 (2)	3	3 (0)	2	19 (2)	5
(Socialist Federal Republic of Yugoslavia) Matjaž Florijančič	12 (0)	0	3 (0)	0	15 (0)	0
(Socialist Federal Republic of Yugoslavia) Elvis Scoria	14 (11)	1	1 (2)	0	15 (13)	1
(Socialist Federal Republic of Yugoslavia) Miro Stipić	22 (5)	1	1 (1)	0	23 (6)	1
(Socialist Federal Republic of Yugoslavia) Fabijan Komljenović	14 (1)	4	0 (0)	0	14 (1)	4
(Socialist Federal Republic of Yugoslavia) Ivan Kurtović	9 (2)	1	0 (0)	0	9 (2)	1
(Socialist Federal Republic of Yugoslavia) Dubravko Pavličić	8 (1)	1	0 (0)	0	8 (1)	1
(Socialist Federal Republic of Yugoslavia) Valdi Šumberac	1 (7)	0	0 (0)	0	1 (7)	0
(Socialist Federal Republic of Yugoslavia) Predrag Valenčić	2 (5)	0	0 (0)	0	2 (5)	0
(Socialist Federal Republic of Yugoslavia) Nedžad Kuruzović	1 (0)	0	0 (0)	0	1 (0)	0
(Socialist Federal Republic of Yugoslavia) Xhevdet Muriqi	2 (0)	0	0 (0)	0	2 (0)	0
(Socialist Federal Republic of Yugoslavia) Boris Ekmeščić	0 (0)	0	0 (1)	0	0 (1)	0
(Socialist Federal Republic of Yugoslavia) David Sabadin	0 (7)	0	0 (0)	0	0 (7)	0
(Socialist Federal Republic of Yugoslavia) Dragan Skočić	1 (0)	0	0 (0)	0	1 (0)	0
(Socialist Federal Republic of Yugoslavia) Daniel Šarić	1 (0)	0	0 (0)	0	1 (0)	0
(Socialist Federal Republic of Yugoslavia) Mladen Žganjer	1 (0)	0	0 (0)	0	1 (0)	0

== Notes ==
1. Data for league attendance in most cases reflects the number of sold tickets and may not be indicative of the actual attendance.

== See also ==
- 1989–90 Yugoslav First League
- 1989–90 Yugoslav Cup
