= 1992–93 NK Rijeka season =

Rijeka
1992–93 season
- Chairman: Darko Čargonja, Josip Lokmer
- Manager: Marijan Jantoljak, Srećko Juričić, Mile Tomljenović
- Prva HNL: 4th
- Croatian Cup: Round 2
- Top goalscorer: League: Zoran Ban, Elvis Scoria (8); All: Elvis Scoria (9)
- Highest home attendance: 7,000 vs (Croatia) Hajduk Split (1 November 1992 - Prva HNL)
- Lowest home attendance: 500 (2 times - Croatian Cup)
- Average home league attendance: 2,220

The 1992–93 season was the 47th season in Rijeka's history. It was their 2nd season in the Prva HNL and 19th successive top tier season.

== Competitions ==
Competition	First match	Last match	Starting round	Final position	Record							
Competition	First match	Last match	Starting round	Final position	G	W	D	L	GF	GA	GD	Win %
Prva HNL	23 August 1992	13 June 1993	Matchday 1	4th	30	14	11	5	41	24	+17	46.67
Croatian Cup	22 September 1992	5 December 1992	First round	Second round	4	2	1	1	5	5	+0	50.00
Total					34	16	12	6	46	29	+17	47.06

=== Prva HNL ===
==== Classification ====
Pos	Team	Pld	W	D	L	GF	GA	GD	Pts	Qualification
2	Hajduk Split	30	16	10	4	53	27	+26	42	Qualification to Cup Winners' Cup first round
3	NK Zagreb	30	15	10	5	50	27	+23	40	
4	Rijeka	30	14	11	5	41	24	+17	39	
5	Cibalia	30	11	9	10	31	30	+1	31	
6	Osijek	30	11	7	12	40	42	−2	29	

Source: RSSSF.org
Rules for classification: 1st points; 2nd head-to-head points.

==== Results summary ====
Overall								Home						Away					
Pld	W	D	L	GF	GA	GD	Pts	W	D	L	GF	GA	GD	W	D	L	GF	GA	GD
30	14	11	5	41	24	+17	53	10	5	0	24	5	+19	4	6	5	17	19	−2

==== Results by round ====
Round	1	2	3	4	5	6	7	8	9	10	11	12	13	14	15	16	17	18	19	20	21	22	23	24	25	26	27	28	29	30
Ground	H	A	H	A	H	A	H	A	H	A	H	A	H	H	A	A	H	A	H	A	H	A	H	A	H	A	H	A	A	H
Result	W	D	W	W	W	D	W	L	W	D	D	L	D	D	L	D	W	D	W	D	D	L	D	W	W	L	W	W	W	W
Position	5	7	5	3	2	2	3	4	3	3	3	3	3	4	4	4	4	4	4	4	4	4	5	4	4	4	4	4	4	4

Source: Competitive matches
A = Away; H = Home; W = Win; D = Draw; L = Loss

== Matches ==
=== Prva HNL ===
Round	Date	Venue	Opponent	Score	Attendance	Rijeka Scorers	Report
1	23 Aug	H	Pazinka	2 – 0	1,000	Cazin, Scoria	HRnogomet.com
2	29 Aug	A	Inker Zaprešić	1 – 1	2,500	Scoria	HRnogomet.com
3	6 Sep	H	Cibalia	1 – 0	1,000	Ban	HRnogomet.com
4	13 Sep	A	Šibenik	4 – 1	1,000	Vulić (2), Ban, Scoria	HRnogomet.com
5	20 Sep	H	Zadar	2 – 0	1,500	Tomljenović, Šarić	HRnogomet.com
6	27 Sep	A	Belišće	1 – 1	500	Tomljenović	HRnogomet.com
7	4 Oct	H	Zagreb	1 – 0	3,000	Šarić	HRnogomet.com
8	11 Oct	A	Istra	1 – 2	4,000	Šarić	HRnogomet.com
9	18 Oct	H	Radnik	3 – 0	1,000	Ban, Tomljenović, Scoria	HRnogomet.com
10	25 Oct	A	Osijek	1 – 1	5,000	Tadić	HRnogomet.com
11	1 Nov	H	Hajduk Split	0 – 0	7,000		HRnogomet.com
12	8 Nov	A	Dubrovnik	0 – 2	3,000		HRnogomet.com
13	15 Nov	H	Segesta	1 – 1	800	Kurtović	HRnogomet.com
14	22 Nov	H	Varteks	1 – 1	1,000	Kurtović	HRnogomet.com
15	29 Nov	A	HAŠK Građanski	2 – 4	10,000	Belajić, Šarić	HRnogomet.com
16	7 Mar	A	Pazinka	0 – 0	2,000		HRnogomet.com
17	14 Mar	H	Inker Zaprešić	2 – 1	3,000	Černe, Šašivarević	HRnogomet.com
18	21 Mar	A	Cibalia	1 – 1	5,000	Scoria	HRnogomet.com
19	28 Mar	H	Šibenik	1 – 0	2,000	Knežević	HRnogomet.com
20	4 Apr	AR	Zadar	1 – 1	1,500	Scoria	HRnogomet.com
21	10 Apr	H	Belišće	1 – 1	2,000	Šašivarević	HRnogomet.com
22	18 Apr	A	Zagreb	0 – 1	8,000		HRnogomet.com
23	25 Apr	H	Istra	0 – 0	2,000		HRnogomet.com
24	1 May	A	Radnik	2 – 1	2,000	Šarić, Knežević	HRnogomet.com
25	9 May	H	Osijek	2 – 0	1,500	Scoria (2)	HRnogomet.com
26	16 May	A	Hajduk Split	0 – 3	5,000		HRnogomet.com
27	23 May	H	Dubrovnik	5 – 0	1,000	Knežević (2), Ban (2), Šarić	HRnogomet.com
28	30 May	A	Segesta	2 – 0	3,000	Ban, Pavličić	HRnogomet.com
29	6 Jun	A	Varteks	1 – 0	6,000	Šašivarević	HRnogomet.com
30	13 Jun	H	Croatia Zagreb	2 – 1	5,500	Ban (2)	HRnogomet.com

Source: HRnogomet.com

=== Croatian Cup ===
Round	Date	Venue	Opponent	Score	Attendance	Rijeka Scorers	Report
R1	22 Sep	H	Segesta	2 – 2	500	Šarić, Šašivarević	HRnogomet.com
R1	7 Oct	A	Segesta	2 – 1	3,500	Tadić, Scoria	HRnogomet.com
R2	18 Nov	A	Varteks	0 – 2	3,500		HRnogomet.com
R2	5 Dec	H	Varteks	1 – 0	500	Šarić	HRnogomet.com

Source: HRnogomet.com

=== Squad statistics ===
Competitive matches only.
Appearances in brackets indicate numbers of times the player came on as a substitute.

Name	Apps	Goals	Apps	Goals	Apps	Goals
Name	League		Cup		Total	
(Croatia) Mladen Žganjer	24 (0)	0	3 (0)	0	27 (0)	0
(Croatia) Robert Rubčić	24 (0)	0	4 (0)	0	28 (0)	0
(Croatia) Mladen Romić	28 (0)	0	4 (0)	0	32 (0)	0
(Croatia) Ivan Kurtović	15 (4)	2	2 (1)	0	17 (5)	2
(Croatia) Dubravko Pavličić	28 (0)	1	4 (0)	0	32 (0)	1
(Croatia) Stojan Belajić	25 (0)	1	4 (0)	0	29 (0)	1
(Croatia) Elvis Brajković	23 (4)	0	3 (1)	0	26 (5)	0
(Croatia) Daniel Šarić	26 (1)	6	4 (0)	2	30 (1)	8
(Bosnia and Herzegovina) Fuad Šašivarević	21 (0)	3	4 (0)	1	25 (0)	4
(Croatia) Zoran Ban	24 (1)	8	4 (0)	0	28 (1)	8
(Croatia) Elvis Scoria	28 (1)	8	3 (0)	1	31 (1)	9
(Croatia) Davor Černe	10 (1)	1	0 (0)	0	10 (1)	1
(Croatia) Vlado Tomljenović	14 (0)	3	3 (0)	0	17 (0)	3
(Croatia) Dragan Tadić	6 (10)	1	1 (1)	1	7 (11)	2
(Croatia) Damir Knežević	9 (2)	4	0 (0)	0	9 (2)	4
(Croatia) Igor Bernobić	1 (8)	0	0 (0)	0	1 (8)	0
(Croatia) Marijan Bjelanović	6 (0)	0	1 (0)	0	7 (0)	0
(Croatia) Mario Tokić	4 (2)	0	0 (0)	0	4 (2)	0
(Croatia) Jasmin Samardžić	0 (10)	0	0 (3)	0	0 (13)	0
(Croatia) Kazimir Vulić	4 (0)	2	0 (0)	0	4 (0)	2
(Croatia) Zoran Cazin	1 (3)	1	0 (0)	0	1 (3)	1
(Croatia) Mario Mataja	4 (1)	0	0 (0)	0	4 (1)	0
(Croatia) Damir Laser	1 (4)	0	0 (0)	0	1 (4)	0
(Croatia) Slobodan Grubor	2 (0)	0	0 (0)	0	2 (0)	0
(Croatia) Alen Horvat	1 (2)	0	0 (0)	0	1 (2)	0
(Croatia) Armando Mlinar	1 (2)	0	0 (0)	0	1 (2)	0

== See also ==
- 1992–93 Prva HNL
- 1992–93 Croatian Cup
