= 1988–89 NK Rijeka season =

Rijeka
1988–89 season
- Chairman: Dragan Krčelić
- Manager: Mladen Vranković
- First League: 10th
- Cup: Round 1
- Top goalscorer: League: Mladen Mladenović (13); All: Mladen Mladenović (13)
- Highest home attendance: 9,570 vs (Socialist Federal Republic of Yugoslavia) Hajduk Split (4 December 1988 - Yugoslav First League)
- Lowest home attendance: 1,063 vs (Socialist Federal Republic of Yugoslavia) Napredak Kruševac (18 December 1988 - Yugoslav First League)
- Average home league attendance: 2,805

The 1988–89 season was the 43rd season in Rijeka's history and their 27th season in the Yugoslav First League. Their 8th-place finish in the 1987–88 season meant it was their 15th successive season playing in the Yugoslav First League.

== Competitions ==
Competition	First match	Last match	Starting round	Final position	Record							
Competition	First match	Last match	Starting round	Final position	G	W	D	L	GF	GA	GD	Win %
Yugoslav First League	7 August 1988	4 June 1989	Matchday 1	10th	34	14	7	13	35	34	+1	41.18
Yugoslav Cup	10 August 1988	10 August 1988	First round	First round	1	0	0	1	1	3	−2	0.00
Total					35	14	7	14	36	37	−1	40.00

=== Yugoslav First League ===
==== Classification ====
Pos	Team	Pld	W	PKW	PKL	L	GF	GA	GD	Pts
8	Osijek	34	13	5	2	14	49	50	−1	31
9	Vardar	34	13	3	4	14	46	51	−5	29
10	Rijeka	34	14	0	7	13	35	34	+1	28
11	Velež	34	13	2	2	17	42	43	−1	28
12	Sloboda Tuzla	34	11	6	6	11	35	42	−7	28

Source: rsssf.org
Rules for classification: 1) points; 2) goal difference; 3) number of goals scored.

==== Results summary ====
Overall								Home						Away					
Pld	W	D	L	GF	GA	GD	Pts	W	D	L	GF	GA	GD	W	D	L	GF	GA	GD
34	14	7	13	35	34	+1	49	9	5	3	22	9	+13	5	2	10	13	25	−12

==== Results by round ====
Round	1	2	3	4	5	6	7	8	9	10	11	12	13	14	15	16	17	18	19	20	21	22	23	24	25	26	27	28	29	30	31	32	33	34
Ground	A	H	A	H	A	H	A	A	H	A	H	A	H	A	H	A	H	H	A	H	A	H	A	H	H	H	A	A	H	A	H	A	H	A
Result	W	L	L	L	L	W	W	D	D	L	W	D	D	W	D	L	W	W	L	W	L	L	L	W	W	L	D	W	W	L	D	L	W	W
Position	2	6	12	15	15	15	9	10	15	16	13	14	15	14	14	16	13	11	12	11	12	14	14	13	11	13	15	11	11	11	13	15	12	10

Source: Competitive matches
A = Away; H = Home; W = Win; D = Draw; L = Loss

== Matches ==
=== First League ===
Round	Date	Venue	Opponent	Score	Attendance^{1}	Rijeka Scorers
1	7 Aug	A	Osijek	3 – 1	1,377	Valenčić, Kljajić, Mladenović
2	14 Aug	H	Budućnost	0 – 1	2,522	
3	21 Aug	A	Vardar	2 – 3	6,357	Ekmeščić, Mladenović
4	28 Aug	H	Rad	0 – 1	1,889	
5	4 Sep	A	Red Star	1 – 5	12,336	Vujčić
6	10 Sep	H	Željezničar	3 – 0	1,585	Ljubančić, Ekmeščić, Vujčić
9	2 Oct	H	Spartak Subotica	0 – 0 (5–6 p)	1,245	
10	9 Oct	A	Radnički Niš	0 – 1	2,684	
8	16 Oct	A	Sloboda	0 – 0 (4–5 p)	755	
11	23 Oct	H	Čelik	2 – 1	1,633	Mladenović, Florijančič
12	30 Oct	A	Vojvodina	0 – 0 (3–4 p)	1,079	
7	2 Nov	A	Velež	3 – 0	1,677	Mladenović (3, 1p)
13	5 Nov	H	Partizan	1 – 1 (3–4 p)	4,401	Mladenović
14	27 Nov	A	Sarajevo	2 – 1	606	Valenčić, Mladenović
15	4 Dec	H	Hajduk Split	0 – 0 (1–3 p)	9,570	
16	14 Dec	A	Dinamo Zagreb	0 – 2	4,544	
17	18 Dec	H	Napredak Kruševac	4 – 1	1,063	Valenčić (2), Ekmeščić, Mladenović
18	26 Feb	H	Osijek	2 – 0	1,755	Ekmeščić (2)
19	5 Mar	A	Budućnost	0 – 1	1,297	
20	12 Mar	H	Vardar	3 – 0	1,871	Florijančič (2), Rubčić
21	18 Mar	A	Rad	0 – 4	520	
22	26 Mar	H	Red Star	1 – 2	7,646	Mladenović
23	2 Apr	A	Željezničar	0 – 1	2,133	
24	9 Apr	H	Velež	2 – 1	1,827	Ekmeščić, Paliska
25	16 Apr	H	Sloboda	1 – 0	2,238	Vujčić
26	19 Apr	A	Spartak Subotica	0 – 1	2,049	
27	3 May	H	Radnički Niš	0 – 0 (4–5 p)	1,237	
28	7 May	A	Čelik	1 – 0	3,288	Mladenović
29	14 May	H	Vojvodina	2 – 1	2,272	Rubčić (2)
30	21 May	A	Partizan	0 – 1	5,154	
31	24 May	H	Sarajevo	0 – 0 (2–3 p)	1,462	
32	28 May	A	Hajduk Split	0 – 4	3,699	
33	31 May	H	Dinamo Zagreb	1 – 0	3,466	Mladenović (p)
34	4 Jun	A	Napredak Kruševac	1 – 0	764	Mladenović

Source: rsssf.com

=== Yugoslav Cup ===
Round	Date	Venue	Opponent	Score	Rijeka Scorers
R1	10 Aug	A	Napredak Kruševac	1 – 3	Kljajić

Source: rsssf.com

=== Squad statistics ===
Competitive matches only.
Appearances in brackets indicate numbers of times the player came on as a substitute.

Name	Apps	Goals	Apps	Goals	Apps	Goals
Name	League		Cup		Total	
(Socialist Federal Republic of Yugoslavia) Tonči Gabrić	25 (0)	0	0 (0)	0	25 (0)	0
(Socialist Federal Republic of Yugoslavia) Mladen Romić	30 (0)	0	1 (0)	0	31 (0)	0
(Socialist Federal Republic of Yugoslavia) Branko Dragutinović	33 (0)	1	1 (0)	0	34 (0)	1
(Socialist Federal Republic of Yugoslavia) Saša Peršon	32 (0)	0	1 (0)	0	33 (0)	0
(Socialist Federal Republic of Yugoslavia) Roberto Paliska	21 (2)	1	0 (1)	0	21 (3)	1
(Socialist Federal Republic of Yugoslavia) Robert Rubčić	32 (0)	3	1 (0)	0	33 (0)	3
(Socialist Federal Republic of Yugoslavia) Dušan Kljajić	22 (3)	1	1 (0)	1	23 (3)	2
(Socialist Federal Republic of Yugoslavia) Mladen Mladenović	33 (0)	13	1 (0)	0	34 (0)	13
(Socialist Federal Republic of Yugoslavia) Boris Ekmeščić	22 (7)	6	1 (0)	0	23 (7)	6
(Socialist Federal Republic of Yugoslavia) Zoran Vujčić	28 (1)	3	1 (0)	0	29 (1)	3
(Socialist Federal Republic of Yugoslavia) Predrag Valenčić	30 (0)	4	0 (0)	0	30 (0)	4
(Socialist Federal Republic of Yugoslavia) Matjaž Florijančič	25 (0)	3	1 (0)	0	26 (0)	3
(Socialist Federal Republic of Yugoslavia) Valdi Šumberac	8 (13)	0	0 (0)	0	8 (13)	0
(Socialist Federal Republic of Yugoslavia) Enver Jahić	6 (3)	0	1 (0)	0	7 (3)	0
(Socialist Federal Republic of Yugoslavia) Nedžad Kuruzović	4 (2)	0	0 (0)	0	4 (2)	0
(Socialist Federal Republic of Yugoslavia) Zvonko Radoš	5 (0)	0	1 (0)	0	6 (0)	0
(Socialist Federal Republic of Yugoslavia) Vlado Miloševič	1 (1)	0	0 (0)	0	1 (1)	0
(Socialist Federal Republic of Yugoslavia) Dean Ljubančić	4 (8)	1	0 (0)	0	4 (8)	1
(Socialist Federal Republic of Yugoslavia) Stojan Belajić	3 (2)	0	0 (0)	0	3 (2)	0
(Socialist Federal Republic of Yugoslavia) Marin Galić	2 (2)	0	0 (0)	0	2 (2)	0
(Socialist Federal Republic of Yugoslavia) Miro Stipić	7 (5)	0	0 (0)	0	7 (5)	0
(Socialist Federal Republic of Yugoslavia) David Sabadin	1 (1)	0	0 (0)	0	1 (1)	0
(Socialist Federal Republic of Yugoslavia) Nevenko Vasiljević	0 (4)	0	0 (0)	0	0 (4)	0
(Socialist Federal Republic of Yugoslavia) Ivica Klapan	0 (1)	0	0 (0)	0	0 (1)	0
(Socialist Federal Republic of Yugoslavia) Elmir Imširević	0 (2)	0	0 (0)	0	0 (2)	0

== Notes ==
1. Data for league attendance in most cases reflects the number of sold tickets and may not be indicative of the actual attendance.

== See also ==
- 1988–89 Yugoslav First League
- 1988–89 Yugoslav Cup
