= 1991–92 NK Rijeka season =

Rijeka
1991–92 season
- Chairman: Darko Čargonja
- Manager: Marijan Jantoljak
- Prva HNL: 6th
- Croatian Cup: Semifinal
- Top goalscorer: League: Zoran Škerjanc, Dean Ljubančić (6); All: Zoran Škerjanc, Dean Ljubančić (6)
- Highest home attendance: 6,000 vs (Croatia) Hajduk Split (16 May 1992 - Prva HNL)
- Lowest home attendance: 300 vs (Croatia) Zadar (28 March 1992 - Prva HNL)
- Average home league attendance: 1,664

The 1991–92 season was the 46th season in Rijeka’s history. It was their 1st season in the Prva HNL and 18th successive top tier season.

In autumn 1991, Rijeka was played only friendly matches, as the domestic competitions were postponed to the spring 1992 due to the Croatian War of Independence.

== Competitions ==
Competition	First match	Last match	Starting round	Final position	Record							
Competition	First match	Last match	Starting round	Final position	G	W	D	L	GF	GA	GD	Win %
Prva HNL	29 February 1992	13 June 1992	Matchday 1	6th	22	10	5	7	26	22	+4	45.45
Croatian Cup	24 March 1992	19 May 1992	Quarterfinal	Semifinal	4	1	2	1	4	4	+0	25.00
Total					26	11	7	8	30	26	+4	42.31

=== Prva HNL ===
==== Classification ====
Pos	Team	Pld	W	D	L	GF	GA	GD	Pts
4	Inker Zaprešić	22	10	6	6	37	19	+18	26 (Note: Head-to-head record: Inker Zaprešić–HAŠK Građanski 2−1, HAŠK Građanski–Inker Zaprešić 0−2.)
5	HAŠK Građanski	22	11	4	7	32	21	+11	26
6	Rijeka	22	10	5	7	26	22	+4	25
7	Istra Pula	22	8	5	9	22	27	−5	21
8	Varteks	22	7	6	9	32	25	+7	20

Source: RSSSF.org
Rules for classification: 1st points; 2nd head-to-head points.

==== Results summary ====
Overall								Home						Away					
Pld	W	D	L	GF	GA	GD	Pts	W	D	L	GF	GA	GD	W	D	L	GF	GA	GD
22	10	5	7	26	22	+4	35	8	2	1	18	4	+14	2	3	6	8	18	−10

==== Results by round ====
Round	1	2	3	4	5	6	7	8	9	10	11	12	13	14	15	16	17	18	19	20	21	22
Ground	H	A	H	A	H	A	H	H	A	H	A	A	H	A	H	A	H	A	A	H	A	H
Result	W	D	W	W	W	L	W	W	L	W	L	W	W	L	W	L	L	D	L	D	D	D
Position	3	5	3	2	2	2	2	2	3	2	3	3	2	3	3	5	5	5	6	6	6	6

Source: Competitive matches
A = Away; H = Home; W = Win; D = Draw; L = Loss

== Matches ==
=== Prva HNL ===
Round	Date	Venue	Opponent	Score	Attendance	Rijeka Scorers	Report
1	29 Feb	H	Šibenik	2 – 0	2,000	Ban, Scoria	HRnogomet.com
2	7 Mar	A	Istra	1 – 1	4,000	Ban	HRnogomet.com
3	10 Mar	H	Cibalia	1 – 0	500	o.g.	HRnogomet.com
4	14 Mar	AR	Dubrovnik	1 – 0	800	Scoria	HRnogomet.com
5	17 Mar	H	HAŠK Građanski	1 – 0	5,000	Škerjanc	HRnogomet.com
6	21 Mar	A	Hajduk Split	0 – 3	10,000		HRnogomet.com
7	28 Mar	H	Zadar	4 – 1	300	Černe, Ban, Brajković, Ljubančić	HRnogomet.com
8	31 Mar	H	Osijek	2 – 0	1,000	Ban, Ljubančić	HRnogomet.com
9	4 Apr	A	Inker Zaprešić	0 – 3^{1}	3,000		HRnogomet.com
10	11 Apr	H	Varteks	1 – 0	1,000	Škerjanc	HRnogomet.com
11	14 Apr	A	Zagreb	0 – 1	4,000		HRnogomet.com
12	25 Apr	AR	Šibenik	2 – 1	300	Škerjanc, Šarić	HRnogomet.com
13	2 May	H	Istra	3 – 0	1,000	Ljubančić (3)	HRnogomet.com
14	5 May	AR	Cibalia	0 – 2	1,000		HRnogomet.com
15	9 May	H	Dubrovnik	3 – 0	500	Ljubančić, Romić, Škerjanc	HRnogomet.com
16	12 May	A	HAŠK Građanski	0 – 2	7,000		HRnogomet.com
17	16 May	H	Hajduk Split	0 – 2	6,000		HRnogomet.com
18	23 May	AR	Zadar	1 – 1	300	Škerjanc	HRnogomet.com
19	26 May	AR	Osijek	2 – 3	1,000	Šanjug, Šarić	HRnogomet.com
20	30 May	H	Inker Zaprešić	0 – 0	500		HRnogomet.com
21	6 Jun	A	Varteks	1 – 1	5,000	Vulić	HRnogomet.com
22	13 Jun	H	Zagreb	1 – 1	500	Škerjanc	HRnogomet.com

Source: HRnogomet.com

=== Croatian Cup ===
Round	Date	Venue	Opponent	Score	Attendance	Rijeka Scorers	Report
QF	24 Mar	H	Hajduk Split	0 – 0	3,000		HRnogomet.com
QF	7 Apr	A	Hajduk Split	1 – 1	8,000	Černe	HRnogomet.com
SF	28 Apr	H	HAŠK Građanski	2 – 1	5,000	Pavličić, Vulić	HRnogomet.com
SF	19 May	A	HAŠK Građanski	1 – 2 (1–3 p)	15,000	Vulić	HRnogomet.com

Source: HRnogomet.com

=== Squad statistics ===
Competitive matches only.
Appearances in brackets indicate numbers of times the player came on as a substitute.

Name	Apps	Goals	Apps	Goals	Apps	Goals
Name	League		Cup		Total	
(Croatia) Mladen Žganjer	22 (0)	0	4 (0)	0	26 (0)	0
(Croatia) Robert Rubčić	18 (0)	0	2 (0)	0	20 (0)	0
(Croatia) Mladen Romić	14 (0)	1	3 (0)	0	17 (0)	1
(Croatia) Ivan Kurtović	14 (0)	0	2 (0)	0	16 (0)	0
(Croatia) Dubravko Pavličić	18 (0)	0	3 (0)	1	21 (0)	1
(Croatia) Stojan Belajić	20 (0)	0	3 (0)	0	23 (0)	0
(Croatia) Kazimir Vulić	20 (0)	1	4 (0)	2	24 (0)	3
(Croatia) Elvis Brajković	10 (3)	1	3 (0)	0	13 (3)	1
(Croatia) Daniel Šarić	18 (0)	2	3 (1)	0	21 (1)	2
(Croatia) Zoran Škerjanc	20 (0)	6	2 (1)	0	22 (1)	6
(Croatia) Dean Ljubančić	11 (6)	6	2 (0)	0	13 (6)	6
(Croatia) Zoran Ban	12 (0)	4	3 (0)	0	15 (0)	4
(Croatia) Davor Černe	13 (4)	1	3 (1)	1	16 (5)	2
(Croatia) Slobodan Grubor	9 (6)	0	2 (1)	0	11 (7)	0
(Croatia) Elvis Scoria	4 (0)	2	0 (0)	0	4 (0)	2
(Croatia) Zoran Cazin	10 (1)	0	1 (2)	0	11 (3)	0
(Croatia) Željko Šanjug	3 (5)	1	1 (0)	0	4 (5)	1
(Croatia) Vlado Tomljenović	4 (7)	0	2 (1)	0	6 (8)	0
(Croatia) Alen Horvat	2 (2)	0	1 (0)	0	3 (2)	0
(Croatia) Igor Bernobić	0 (1)	0	0 (0)	0	0 (1)	0
(Croatia) Jasmin Samardžić	0 (3)	0	0 (1)	0	0 (4)	0

== See also ==
- 1992 Prva HNL
- 1992 Croatian Cup

== Notes ==
1. The game was abandoned in the 76th minute as Rijeka players protested the referee’s decision to award Inter the penalty kick. At the time, Rijeka was leading 1–0. The match was voided and awarded 3–0 to Inker.

== External sources ==
- 1992 Prva HNL at HRnogomet.com
- 1992 Croatian Cup at HRnogomet.com
- Prvenstvo 1992. at nk-rijeka.hr
