= 1987–88 NK Rijeka season =

Rijeka
1987–88 season
- Chairman: Dragan Krčelić
- Manager: Mladen Vranković
- First League: 8th
- Cup: Round 1
- Top goalscorer: League: Janko Janković, Zoran Škerjanc (9); All: Janko Janković, Zoran Škerjanc (9)
- Highest home attendance: 12,531 vs (Socialist Federal Republic of Yugoslavia) Dinamo Zagreb (1 November 1987 - Yugoslav First League)
- Lowest home attendance: 1,000 vs (Socialist Federal Republic of Yugoslavia) Sarajevo (12 June 1988 - Yugoslav First League)
- Average home league attendance: 4,445

The 1987–88 season was the 42nd season in Rijeka's history and their 26th season in the Yugoslav First League. Their 4th place finish in the 1986–87 season meant it was their 14th successive season playing in the Yugoslav First League.

== Competitions ==
| Competition | First match | Last match | Starting round | Final position | Record | | | | | | | |
| Competition | First match | Last match | Starting round | Final position | G | W | D | L | GF | GA | GD | Win % |
|---|---|---|---|---|---|---|---|---|---|---|---|---|
| Yugoslav First League | 2 August 1987 | 12 June 1988 | Matchday 1 | 8th | 34 | 9 | 14 | 11 | 33 | 39 | −6 | 26.47 |
| Yugoslav Cup | 12 August 1987 | 12 August 1987 | First round | First round | 1 | 0 | 0 | 1 | 0 | 1 | −1 | 0.00 |
| Total | | | | | 35 | 9 | 14 | 12 | 33 | 40 | −7 | 25.71 |

=== Yugoslav First League ===
| Pos | Team | Pld | W | D | L | GF | GA | GD | Pts | Qualification or relegation |
|---|---|---|---|---|---|---|---|---|---|---|
| 6 | Vardar | 34 | 15 | 7 | 12 | 37 | 40 | −3 | 37 | |
| 7 | Radnički Niš | 34 | 14 | 4 | 16 | 48 | 46 | +2 | 32 | Qualification for Balkans Cup |
| 8 | Rijeka | 34 | 9 | 14 | 11 | 33 | 39 | −6 | 32 | |
| 9 | Budućnost | 34 | 10 | 12 | 12 | 40 | 48 | −8 | 32 | |
| 10 | Vojvodina | 34 | 11 | 10 | 13 | 40 | 51 | −11 | 32 | Qualification for Intertoto Cup |

Source: rsssf.org
Rules for classification: 1) points; 2) goal difference; 3) number of goals scored.

==== Results summary ====
| Overall | | | | | | | | Home | | | | | | Away | | | | | |
| Pld | W | D | L | GF | GA | GD | Pts | W | D | L | GF | GA | GD | W | D | L | GF | GA | GD |
|---|---|---|---|---|---|---|---|---|---|---|---|---|---|---|---|---|---|---|---|
| 34 | 9 | 14 | 11 | 33 | 39 | −6 | 41 | 7 | 9 | 1 | 19 | 12 | +7 | 2 | 5 | 10 | 14 | 27 | −13 |

==== Results by round ====
| Round | 1 | 2 | 3 | 4 | 5 | 6 | 7 | 8 | 9 | 10 | 11 | 12 | 13 | 14 | 15 | 16 | 17 | 18 | 19 | 20 | 21 | 22 | 23 | 24 | 25 | 26 | 27 | 28 | 29 | 30 | 31 | 32 | 33 | 34 |
|---|---|---|---|---|---|---|---|---|---|---|---|---|---|---|---|---|---|---|---|---|---|---|---|---|---|---|---|---|---|---|---|---|---|---|
| Ground | H | A | H | A | H | A | H | A | H | A | H | A | H | A | H | H | A | A | H | A | H | A | H | A | H | A | H | A | H | A | H | A | A | H |
| Result | D | D | D | W | W | W | D | L | W | L | W | L | D | D | D | D | D | L | D | D | W | D | D | L | D | L | W | L | W | L | L | L | L | W |
| Position | 9 | 10 | 9 | 4 | 2 | 1 | 2 | 3 | 2 | 4 | 3 | 8 | 7 | 8 | 6 | 8 | 7 | 7 | 7 | 8 | 7 | 7 | 7 | 7 | 8 | 9 | 7 | 7 | 7 | 7 | 8 | 9 | 10 | 8 |

Source: Competitive matches
A = Away; H = Home; W = Win; D = Draw; L = Loss

== Matches ==
=== First League ===
| Round | Date | Venue | Opponent | Score | Attendance^{1} | Rijeka Scorers |
|---|---|---|---|---|---|---|
| 1 | 2 Aug | H | Budućnost | 0 – 0 | 2,701 | |
| 2 | 9 Aug | A | Vojvodina | 1 – 1 | 4,348 | Žagar |
| 3 | 16 Aug | H | Velež | 1 – 1 | 4,312 | o.g. |
| 4 | 23 Aug | A | Čelik | 3 – 0 | 6,031 | Škerjanc (3) |
| 5 | 6 Sep | H | Vardar | 3 – 0 | 2,823 | Škerjanc, Rubčić, Vulić |
| 6 | 13 Sep | A | Red Star | 3 – 2 | 8,813 | Mladenović, Škerjanc, Janković |
| 7 | 20 Sep | H | Rad | 0 – 0 | 6,620 | |
| 8 | 27 Sep | A | Osijek | 0 – 1 | 1,205 | |
| 9 | 4 Oct | H | Sutjeska | 1 – 0 | 3,044 | Škerjanc |
| 10 | 7 Oct | A | Hajduk Split | 0 – 3 | 6,000 | |
| 11 | 18 Oct | H | Priština | 2 – 1 | 4,475 | Škerjanc, Janković |
| 12 | 25 Oct | A | Radnički Niš | 1 – 2 | 5,000 | Paliska |
| 13 | 1 Nov | H | Dinamo Zagreb | 0 – 0 | 12,531 | |
| 14 | 15 Nov | A | Partizan | 1 – 1 | 2,830 | Škerjanc |
| 15 | 22 Nov | H | Željezničar | 0 – 0 | 4,000 | |
| 16 | 29 Nov | H | Sloboda | 1 – 1 | 2,500 | Škerjanc |
| 17 | 6 Dec | A | Sarajevo | 1 – 1 | 756 | Vulić |
| 18 | 6 Mar | A | Budućnost | 0 – 1 | 3,550 | |
| 19 | 13 Mar | H | Vojvodina | 2 – 2 | 2,823 | Vulić, Janković |
| 20 | 20 Mar | A | Velež | 1 – 1 | 4,917 | Janković |
| 21 | 27 Mar | H | Čelik | 2 – 1 | 2,847 | Janković (2, 1p) |
| 22 | 3 Apr | A | Vardar | 0 – 0 | 6,983 | |
| 23 | 10 Apr | H | Red Star | 0 – 0 | 7,850 | |
| 24 | 16 Apr | A | Rad | 0 – 1 | 271 | |
| 25 | 20 Apr | H | Osijek | 0 – 0 | 1,980 | |
| 26 | 24 Apr | A | Sutjeska | 0 – 3 | 1,978 | |
| 27 | 1 May | H | Hajduk Split | 3 – 1 | 12,000 | Mladenović (2), Janković |
| 28 | 4 May | A | Priština | 1 – 2 | 10,000 | Šumberac |
| 29 | 8 May | H | Radnički Niš | 2 – 1 | 1,595 | Janković, Dragutinović |
| 30 | 15 May | A | Dinamo Zagreb | 2 – 3 | 6,750 | Mladenović, Janković |
| 31 | 22 May | H | Partizan | 0 – 3 | 7,459 | |
| 32 | 29 May | A | Željezničar | 0 – 3 | 2,405 | |
| 33 | 8 Jun | A | Sloboda | 0 – 2 | 1,500 | |
| 34 | 12 Jun | H | Sarajevo | 2 – 1 | 1,000 | Ljubančić, Mladenović |

Source: rsssf.com

=== Yugoslav Cup ===
| Round | Date | Venue | Opponent | Score | Rijeka Scorers |
|---|---|---|---|---|---|
| R1 | 12 Aug | A | Borac Čačak | 0 – 1 | |

Source: rsssf.com

=== Squad statistics ===
Competitive matches only.
Appearances in brackets indicate numbers of times the player came on as a substitute.

| Name | Apps | Goals | Apps | Goals | Apps | Goals |
| Name | League | | Cup | | Total | |
|---|---|---|---|---|---|---|
| (Socialist Federal Republic of Yugoslavia) Mauro Ravnić | 26 (0) | 0 | 0 (0) | 0 | 26 (0) | 0 |
| (Socialist Federal Republic of Yugoslavia) Borče Sredojević | 17 (0) | 0 | 1 (0) | 0 | 18 (0) | 0 |
| (Socialist Federal Republic of Yugoslavia) Branko Dragutinović | 33 (0) | 1 | 1 (0) | 0 | 34 (0) | 1 |
| (Socialist Federal Republic of Yugoslavia) Saša Peršon | 28 (0) | 0 | 1 (0) | 0 | 29 (0) | 0 |
| (Socialist Federal Republic of Yugoslavia) Igor Jelavić | 30 (1) | 0 | 1 (0) | 0 | 31 (1) | 0 |
| (Socialist Federal Republic of Yugoslavia) Roberto Paliska | 21 (6) | 1 | 1 (0) | 0 | 22 (6) | 1 |
| (Socialist Federal Republic of Yugoslavia) Janko Janković | 32 (1) | 9 | 1 (0) | 0 | 33 (1) | 9 |
| (Socialist Federal Republic of Yugoslavia) Mladen Mladenović | 27 (3) | 5 | 1 (0) | 0 | 28 (3) | 5 |
| (Socialist Federal Republic of Yugoslavia) Zoran Škerjanc | 29 (3) | 9 | 0 (1) | 0 | 29 (4) | 9 |
| (Socialist Federal Republic of Yugoslavia) Robert Rubčić | 31 (0) | 1 | 1 (0) | 0 | 32 (0) | 1 |
| (Socialist Federal Republic of Yugoslavia) Matjaž Florijančič | 12 (11) | 0 | 0 (1) | 0 | 12 (12) | 0 |
| (Socialist Federal Republic of Yugoslavia) Kazimir Vulić | 8 (12) | 3 | 0 (0) | 0 | 8 (12) | 3 |
| (Socialist Federal Republic of Yugoslavia) Valdi Šumberac | 4 (11) | 1 | 0 (0) | 0 | 4 (11) | 1 |
| (Socialist Federal Republic of Yugoslavia) Robert Žagar | 19 (3) | 1 | 1 (0) | 0 | 20 (3) | 1 |
| (Socialist Federal Republic of Yugoslavia) Željko Jurin | 13 (4) | 0 | 0 (0) | 0 | 13 (4) | 0 |
| (Socialist Federal Republic of Yugoslavia) Zoran Ivković | 9 (2) | 0 | 0 (0) | 0 | 9 (2) | 0 |
| (Socialist Federal Republic of Yugoslavia) Nedžad Kuruzović | 5 (1) | 0 | 0 (0) | 0 | 5 (1) | 0 |
| (Socialist Federal Republic of Yugoslavia) Vlado Kotur | 5 (2) | 0 | 0 (0) | 0 | 5 (2) | 0 |
| (Socialist Federal Republic of Yugoslavia) Jovan Savić | 3 (0) | 0 | 1 (0) | 0 | 4 (0) | 0 |
| (Socialist Federal Republic of Yugoslavia) Vlado Miloševič | 5 (0) | 0 | 1 (0) | 0 | 6 (0) | 0 |
| (Socialist Federal Republic of Yugoslavia) Predrag Valenčić | 9 (3) | 0 | 0 (0) | 0 | 9 (3) | 0 |
| (Socialist Federal Republic of Yugoslavia) Dean Ljubančić | 1 (2) | 1 | 0 (0) | 0 | 1 (2) | 1 |
| (Socialist Federal Republic of Yugoslavia) Stojan Belajić | 3 (0) | 0 | 0 (0) | 0 | 3 (0) | 0 |
| (Socialist Federal Republic of Yugoslavia) Bojan Krkić, Sr. | 0 (1) | 0 | 0 (0) | 0 | 0 (1) | 0 |
| (Socialist Federal Republic of Yugoslavia) Dragan Stanić | 2 (0) | 0 | 0 (0) | 0 | 2 (0) | 0 |
| (Socialist Federal Republic of Yugoslavia) Danko Matrljan | 1 (0) | 0 | 0 (0) | 0 | 1 (0) | 0 |
| (Socialist Federal Republic of Yugoslavia) Željko Cupać | 0 (1) | 0 | 0 (0) | 0 | 0 (1) | 0 |
| (Socialist Federal Republic of Yugoslavia) Rajko Šarić | 1 (0) | 0 | 0 (0) | 0 | 1 (0) | 0 |

== Notes ==
1. Data for league attendance in most cases reflects the number of sold tickets and may not be indicative of the actual attendance.

== See also ==
- 1987–88 Yugoslav First League
- 1987–88 Yugoslav Cup
