= 1991–92 Sydney Croatia FC season =

Sydney Croatia
1991–1992 season
- Chairman: Tony Topić
- Manager: Mladen Vranković (Rd 1-10), Ivan Ražnjević (Rd 11-26)
- Stadium: Sydney Croatian Sports Centre
- National Soccer League: 12th
- 1991–92 NSL Cup: Second Round
- Top goalscorer: Tony Krslovic (7)
- Highest home attendance: 5,362 vs. Sydney Olympic (7 November 1991); National Soccer League
- Lowest home attendance: 1,115 vs. Marconi Fairfield (4 December 1991); NSL Cup
- Average home league attendance: 2,638
- Biggest win: 3–1 vs. Marconi Fairfield (22 December 1991); National Soccer League
- Biggest defeat: 0–3 vs. Melita Eagles (23 February 1992); National Soccer League

The 1991–92 season saw Sydney Croatia embark on its ninth campaign in the NSL. Ultimately, they finished 12th out of 14 teams.

The season began with a sense of optimism, as Mladen Vranković was appointed as the new coach, bringing with him a wealth of experience from his time at HNK Rijeka in Croatia, he brought with him Fadil Muriqi and Miro Stipić, other key signings included Socceroo Mark Bosnich returning from Manchester United, Joe Caleta, George Jolevski and Argentinian José Iriarte. However, the team's performance failed to live up to expectations, and after securing only one win from the first ten rounds, Vranković was relieved of his duties. Former Melbourne Croatia coach, Ivan Rašnjević was subsequently appointed as his replacement. Despite an improvement in results under Ivan's leadership, with Sydney Croatia losing only one match in his first ten games in charge, the team ultimately fell short of qualifying for the finals series and finished third from the bottom of the table.

The Sydney Croatia Youth team achieved significant success, winning the Northern Division and National Youth League Championships. They triumphed over AIS in the Northern Division Final with a 2-0 victory. In the National Youth League Grand Final, they defeated South Melbourne 3-1.

This season would also prove to be a milestone in the club's history, as it marked the final season that the team would compete under the name Sydney Croatia. The following season, they would adopt the name Sydney CSC, before eventually settling on their current identity as Sydney United.

== Players ==
Note: Flags indicate national team as defined under FIFA eligibility rules; some limited exceptions apply. Players may hold more than one non-FIFA nationality.

No.	Pos.	Nation	Player
—	DF	AUS	Mark Babic
—	GK	AUS	Mark Bosnich
—	FW	AUS	Joe Caleta
—	FW	AUS	Gabriel Gonzalez (Youth)
—	DF	AUS	Mike Grbevski
—	FW	ARG	José Iriarte
—	MF	AUS	George Jolevski
—	DF	CRO	Željko Jurin
—	GK	AUS	Zeljko Kalac
—	FW	AUS	Tony Krslovic (Captain)
—	DF	CRO	Velimir Kuprešak
—	FW	PNG	Manis Lamond

No.	Pos.	Nation	Player
—	MF	AUS	Tomislav Miličević (Youth)
—	MF	KOS	Fadil Muriqi
—	MF	CRO	Ivan Petković (Captain)
—	MF	AUS	Tony Popovic
—	MF	AUS	Pedro Ricoy
—	DF	AUS	Robert Runje
—	DF	AUS	Robert Stanton
—	DF	CRO	Miro Stipić
—	DF	AUS	Petar Vrilic (Youth)
—	FW	AUS	Matthew Zec (Youth)
—	DF	AUS	Ante Žižić

=== Transfers in ===
No.	Pos.	Nat.	Name	Age	Moving from	Type	Transfer window	Ends	Transfer fee	Source
	GK	(Australia)	Mark Bosnich	19	Manchester United (England)	Transfer	Pre-season		Undisclosed	
	MF	(Kosovo)	Fadil Muriqi	31	HNK Rijeka (Croatia)	Transfer	Pre-season		Undisclosed	
	MF	(Croatia)	Miro Stipić	28	HNK Rijeka (Croatia)	Transfer	Pre-season		Undisclosed	
	MF	(Australia)	George Jolevski	22	Kedah FC (Malaysia)	Transfer	Pre-season		Free	
	FW	(Australia)	Joe Caleta	25	Melbourne Croatia (Australia)	Transfer	Pre-season		$15,000	
	DF	(Croatia)	Željko Jurin	30	Wollongong Macedonia (Australia)	Loan Return	Pre-season		Free	
	FW	(Argentina)	José Iriarte	25	Manly Warringah Dolphins (Australia)	Transfer	Pre-season		Undisclosed	
	FW	(Australia)	Mario Jermen	16	St George-Budapest (Australia)	Transfer	Pre-season		Free	

=== Transfers out ===
No.	Pos.	Nat.	Name	Age	Moving to	Type	Transfer window	Transfer fee	Source
	MF	(Australia)	Wally Savor	32	Retirement		Pre-season		
	GK	(Australia)	Tony Franken	26	APIA Leichhardt (Australia)	Transfer	Pre-season	$35,000	
	MF	(Australia)	Ned Zelic	19	Sydney Olympic (Australia)	Transfer	Pre-season	$50,000	
	DF	(Australia)	Paul Carter	27	Blacktown City Demons (Australia)	End of Loan	Pre-season	Free	
	MF	(Australia)	John Gibson	21	Blacktown City Demons (Australia)	End of Loan	Pre-season	Free	
	FW	(Australia)	Clayton Koch	20	Brisbane United (Australia)	End of Contract	Pre-season	Free	
	MF	(Argentina)	Marcelo Toscanelli	27	Colorado Foxes (United States)	End of Contract	Pre-season	Free	
	MF	(Australia)	Andrew French	18	Umina United (Australia)	End of Contract	Pre-season	Free	
	DF	(Croatia)	Ante Rumora	30	Free agent	End of Contract	Pre-season		
	FW	(Scotland)	Gordon Scott	30	Free agent	End of Contract	Pre-season		
	FW	(Chile)	Héctor Pérez	25	Free agent	End of Contract	Pre-season		

== Competitions ==
=== Overview ===
Competition	First match	Last match	Starting round	Final position	Record							
Competition	First match	Last match	Starting round	Final position	Pld	W	D	L	GF	GA	GD	Win %
National Soccer League	8 October 1991	31 March 1992	Matchday 1	12th	26	6	9	11	23	33	−10	23.08
NSL Cup	20 November 1991	4 December 1991	First round	Second Round	2	1	0	1	2	3	−1	50.00
Total					28	7	9	12	25	36	−11	25.00

Last updated: complete
Source: Competitions

=== National Soccer League ===
==== League table ====
Pos	Team	Pld	W	D	L	GF	GA	GD	Pts	Qualification or relegation
1	Melbourne Croatia	26	14	7	5	45	26	+19	35	Qualification for the Finals series
2	Sydney Olympic	26	12	10	4	38	27	+11	34	Qualification for the Finals series
3	South Melbourne	26	13	5	8	51	28	+23	31	Qualification for the Finals series
4	Adelaide City (C)	26	10	9	7	26	23	+3	29	Qualification for the Finals series
5	Wollongong City	26	9	10	7	24	17	+7	28	Qualification for the Finals series
6	Brisbane United	26	8	10	8	31	35	−4	26	
7	Marconi Fairfield	26	10	5	11	33	31	+2	25	
8	APIA Leichhardt (R)	26	7	11	8	26	28	−2	25	Relegation to the NSW Division 1
9	Heidelberg United	26	8	8	10	28	33	−5	24	
10	Parramatta Eagles	26	6	11	9	24	24	0	23	
11	Newcastle Breakers	26	7	8	11	28	39	−11	22	
12	Sydney Croatia	26	6	9	11	22	33	−11	21	
13	West Adelaide	26	7	7	12	25	46	−21	21	
14	Preston Makedonia	26	5	10	11	21	32	−11	20	

Updated to match(es) played on unknown. Source: rsssf.com
Rules for classification: 1) points; 2) goal difference; 3) number of goals scored.
(C) Champions; (R) Relegated

==== Matches ====
6 October 1991 1	Sydney Croatia	1–3	Heidelberg United	Edensor Park, New South Wales
	Muriqi 10'	Report	Rizopoulos 25', 32', 42'	Stadium: Sydney Croatian Sports Centre; Attendance: 3,352

13 October 1991 2	Preston Makedonia	2–0	Sydney Croatia	Reservoir, Victoria
	Trajanovski 11'; Spink 53'	Report		Stadium: B.T. Connor Reserve; Attendance: 2,500

20 October 1991 3	Sydney Croatia	0–1	Melbourne Croatia	Edensor Park, New South Wales
		Report	Kelic 57'	Stadium: Sydney Croatian Sports Centre; Attendance: 3,450; Referee: Gordon Dunster

25 October 1991 4	Newcastle Breakers	1–2	Sydney Croatia	Birmingham Gardens, New South Wales
	Barkley 9'	Report	Krslovic 15'; Caleta 90+4'	Stadium: Breakers Stadium; Attendance: 5,219; Referee: Alex Spiroski

3 November 1991 5	Sydney Croatia	2–2	Brisbane United	Edensor Park, New South Wales
	Ricoy 4'; Krslovic 15'	Report	Slater 14'; C.Koch 77'	Stadium: Sydney Croatian Sports Centre; Attendance: 1,895; Referee: Ziggy Mnich

10 November 1991 6	APIA Leichhardt	0–0	Sydney Croatia	Lilyfield, New South Wales
		Report		Stadium: Leichhardt Oval; Attendance: 3,156; Referee: Bill Monteverde

17 November 1991 7	Sydney Croatia	1–1	Sydney Olympic	Edensor Park, New South Wales
	Popovic 57'	Report	Lee 40'	Stadium: Sydney Croatian Sports Centre; Attendance: 5,326; Referee: Eugene Brazzale

24 November 1991 8	Melita Eagles	2–0	Sydney Croatia	South Granville, New South Wales
	Brown 45'; Falzon 90'	Report		Stadium: Melita Stadium; Attendance: 3,208; Referee: Nestor Zachariadis

1 December 1991 9	Sydney Croatia	0–2	Wollongong City	Edensor Park, New South Wales
		Report	Morlando 74'; Bard 81'	Stadium: Sydney Croatian Sports Centre; Attendance: 2,227; Referee: Gary Brownlie

7 December 1991 10	West Adelaide	1–0	Sydney Croatia	Hindmarsh, South Australia
	Brazzale 80'	Report		Stadium: Hindmarsh Stadium; Attendance: 2,800; Referee: Mike Browning

18 December 1991 11	Sydney Croatia	1–1	Adelaide City	Edensor Park, New South Wales
	Muriqi 78' (pen.)	Report	Veart 38'	Stadium: Sydney Croatian Sports Centre; Attendance: 1,481; Referee: Nestor Zachariadis

22 December 1991 12	Sydney Croatia	3–1	Marconi Fairfield	Edensor Park, New South Wales
	Krslovic 3', 10', 30'	Report	Seal 64'	Stadium: Sydney Croatian Sports Centre; Attendance: 2,023; Referee: Gary Power

26 December 1991 13	South Melbourne FC	0–0	Sydney Croatia	Middle Park, Victoria
		Report		Stadium: Middle Park; Attendance: 2,500; Referee: John Santa Isabel

29 December 1991 14	Heidelberg United	1–2	Sydney Croatia	Heidelberg West, Victoria
	Goutzioulis 35'	Report	Caleta 54'; Muriqi 70'	Stadium: Olympic Village; Attendance: 1,500; Referee: Ziggy Mnich

1 January 1992 15	Sydney Croatia	1–1	Preston Makedonia	Edensor Park, New South Wales
	Krslovic 6'	Report	Spink 29'	Stadium: Sydney Croatian Sports Centre; Attendance: 4,010; Referee: Richard Lorenc

5 January 1992 16	Melbourne Croatia	2–1	Sydney Croatia	Sunshine North, Victoria
	Marth 7'; Silic 58'	Report	Iriarte 40'	Stadium: Somers St; Attendance: 4,000; Referee: Eugene Brazzale

12 January 1992 17	Sydney Croatia	1–0	Newcastle Breakers	Edensor Park, New South Wales
	Caleta 70'	Report		Stadium: Sydney Croatian Sports Centre; Attendance: 2,023; Referee: Gary Power

18 January 1992 18	Brisbane United	1–2	Sydney Croatia	Bowen Hills, Queensland
	C.Slater 79'	Report	Stanton 17'; Jolevski 80'	Stadium: Perry Park; Attendance: 3,200; Referee: Manny Loupis

9 February 1992 19	Sydney Croatia	1–1	APIA Leichhardt	Edensor Park, New South Wales
	Caleta 65'	Report	Ollerenshaw 57'	Stadium: Sydney Croatian Sports Centre; Attendance: 1,590; Referee: Peter Spiers

16 February 1992 20	Sydney Olympic	0–0	Sydney Croatia	Banksia, New South Wales
		Report		Stadium: St George Stadium; Attendance: 4,378; Referee: John McConnell

23 February 1992 21	Sydney Croatia	0–3	Melita Eagles	Edensor Park, New South Wales
		Report	Soper 20'; Genc 29'; Eli Ali 57'	Stadium: Sydney Croatian Sports Centre; Attendance: 1,821; Referee: Richard Lorenc

1 March 1992 22	Wollongong City	0–1	Sydney Croatia	Fairy Meadow, New South Wales
		Report	Krslovic 64'	Stadium: Brandon Park; Attendance: 3,000; Referee: Tom McRoe

9 March 1992 23	Sydney Croatia	0–1	West Adelaide	Edensor Park, New South Wales
		Report	Fletcher 18'	Stadium: Sydney Croatian Sports Centre; Attendance: 1,506; Referee: John McConnell

15 March 1992 24	Adelaide City	2–1	Sydney Croatia	Hindmarsh, South Australia
	Veart 12'; Tobin 72'	Report	Caleta 19'	Stadium: Hindmarsh Stadium; Attendance: 3,100; Referee: David Mortimer

20 March 1992 25	Marconi Fairfield	2–2	Sydney Croatia	Bossley Park, New South Wales
	Seal 35'; Markovski 89'	Report	Lamond 35'; Stipić 65'	Stadium: Marconi Stadium; Attendance: 3,985; Referee: Richard Lorenc

29 March 1992 26	Sydney Croatia	0–2	South Melbourne	Edensor Park, New South Wales
		Report	Wright 27'; Trimboli 55'	Stadium: Sydney Croatian Sports Centre; Attendance: 3,600; Referee: Peter Spiers

=== NSL Cup ===
6 November 1991 First round	Melita Eagles	1–2	Sydney Croatia	Bossley Park, New South Wales
	Soper 18'	Report	Stanton 8'; Iriarte 87'	Stadium: Marconi Stadium; Attendance: 1,673; Referee: Richard Lorenc

4 December 1991 Second round	Sydney Croatia	0–2	Marconi Fairfield	Edensor Park, New South Wales
		Report	Harper 69'; Lowe 82'	Stadium: Sydney Croatian Sports Centre; Attendance: 1,115; Referee: Gary Power

== Statistics ==
=== Appearances and goals ===
Players with no appearances not included in the list.

No.	Pos.	Nat.	Name	National Soccer League		NSL Cup		Total	
No.	Pos.	Nat.	Name	Apps	Goals	Apps	Goals	Apps	Goals
—	DF	(Australia)	Mark Babic	18	0	1	0	19	0
—	GK	(Australia)	Mark Bosnich	5	0	0	0	5	0
—	FW	(Australia)	Joe Caleta	19	5	0	0	19	5
—	DF	(Australia)	Mike Grbevski	22	0	1	0	23	0
—	FW	(Argentina)	José Iriarte	18	1	2	1	20	2
—	MF	(Australia)	George Jolevski	5	1	1	0	6	1
—	DF	(Croatia)	Željko Jurin	13	0	1	0	14	0
—	GK	(Australia)	Zeljko Kalac	21	0	2	0	23	0
—	FW	(Australia)	Tony Krslovic	21	7	2	0	23	7
—	FW	(Papua New Guinea)	Manis Lamond	23	1	1	0	24	1
—	MF	(Australia)	Tomislav Miličević	6	0	1	0	7	0
—	MF	(Kosovo)	Fadil Muriqi	23	3	1	0	24	3
—	MF	(Croatia)	Ivan Petković	9	0	1	0	10	0
—	MF	(Australia)	Tony Popovic	20	1	2	0	22	1
—	MF	(Australia)	Pedro Ricoy	24	1	2	0	26	1
—	DF	(Australia)	Robert Runje	18	0	1	0	19	0
—	DF	(Australia)	Robert Stanton	23	1	1	1	24	2
—	DF	(Croatia)	Miro Stipić	26	1	2	0	28	1
—	FW	(Australia)	Matthew Zec	1	0	1	0	2	0
—	DF	(Australia)	Ante Žižić	7	0	2	0	9	0
