= Dean Ljubančić =

Croatian footballer

Personal information
- Full name: Dean Ljubančić
- Date of birth: 13 October 1969 (age 57)
- Place of birth: Rijeka, SFR Yugoslavia
- Position: Forward

Youth career
- –1987: Rijeka

Senior career*
Years	Team	Apps	(Gls)
1987–1992	Rijeka	46	(8)
1993–1994	Pazinka	3	(1)
1994–1995	VfB Oldenburg	15	(1)
1995–1997	Orijent	19	(8)
- * Club domestic league appearances and goals

Dean Ljubančić (born 13 October 1969 in Rijeka) is a retired Croatian football player who played for Rijeka in the Yugoslav First League, Rijeka, Pazinka and Orijent in the Croatian First Football League, and Oldenburg in German Regionalliga Nord.

Ljubančić was the first player to score a hat-trick in the Croatian First Football League. He scored three times for Rijeka in a 3–0 victory over Istra on 2 May 1992. Ljubančić was also Rijeka's joint league top-scorer in 1992.

== Career statistics ==
=== Club ===
As of 13 August 2018

Club performance			League		Cup		Continental		Total	
Season	Club	League	Apps	Goals	Apps	Goals	Apps	Goals	Apps	Goals
Yugoslavia			League		Cup		Europe		Total	
1987-88	NK Rijeka	Yugoslav First League	3	1	0	0	—		3	1
1988-89	NK Rijeka	Yugoslav First League	12	1	0	0	—		12	1
1989-90	NK Rijeka	Yugoslav First League	—		—		—		0	0
1990-91	NK Rijeka	Yugoslav First League	14	0	0	0	—		14	0
Croatia			League		Cup		Europe		Total	
1992	NK Rijeka	Prva HNL	17	6	2	0	—		19	6
1993-94	NK Pazinka	Prva HNL	3	1	0	0	—		3	1
Germany			League		Cup		Europe		Total	
1994-95	VfB Oldenburg	Regionalliga Nord	15	1	—		—		15	1
Croatia			League		Cup		Europe		Total	
1995-96	NK Orijent	Prva B HNL	16	8	0	0	—		16	8
1996-97	NK Orijent	Prva HNL	3	0	1	0	—		4	0
Career total			83	18	3	0	0	0	86	18
