= Newcastle Breakers FC league record by opponent =

Newcastle Breakers Football Club was an Australian semi-professional association football club based in Newcastle, New South Wales. The club was formed in 1991 and joined the National Soccer League in the 1991–92 season.

Newcastle Breakers' first team had competed in the National Soccer League and their record against each club faced in the National Soccer League is listed below. Newcastle Breakers' first National Soccer League match was against Adelaide City and they met their 23rd and last different opponent, Parramatta Power, for the first time in the 1999–2000 National Soccer League season. The teams that Newcastle Breakers played the most in league competition was Adelaide Force and South Melbourne, who they first met in the 1991–92 National Soccer League season; the 13 defeats from 19 meetings against South Melbourne was more than they have lost against any other club. Wollongong Wolves drew 7 league encounters with Newcastle Breakers, more than any other club. Newcastle Breakers had recorded more league victories against Brisbane Strikers and Sydney United than against any other club, having beaten them 7 times out of 17 attempts.

== Key ==
- The table includes results of matches played by Newcastle Breakers in the National Soccer League.
- The name used for each opponent is the name they had when Newcastle Breakers most recently played a league match against them.
- The columns headed "First" and "Last" contain the first and last seasons in which Newcastle Breakers played league matches against each opponent.
- P = matches played; W = matches won; D = matches drawn; L = matches lost; Win% = percentage of total matches won
- ‡ Clubs with this background and symbol in the "Opponent" column were defunct during the club's period.

== All-time league record ==
Newcastle Breakers FC league record by opponent
Club	P	W	D	L	P	W	D	L	P	W	D	L	Win%	First	Last	Notes
Club	Home				Away				Total				Win%	First	Last	Notes
Adelaide Force	10	3	3	4	9	0	2	7	19	3	5	11	15.79	1991–92	1999–2000	(Note: Record against Adelaide City included.)
Adelaide Sharks	8	3	3	2	7	2	1	4	15	5	4	6	33.33	1991–92	1998–99	(Note: Record against West Adelaide included.)
APIA Leichhardt	1	0	0	1	1	0	0	1	2	0	0	2	0.00	1991–92	1991–92	
Brisbane Strikers	8	4	3	1	9	3	2	4	17	7	5	5	41.18	1991–92	1999–2000	
Brunswick Pumas	1	0	1	0	1	1	0	0	2	1	1	0	50.00	1993–94	1993–94	
Canberra Cosmos	5	3	2	0	6	1	2	3	11	4	4	3	36.36	1995–96	1999–2000	
Carlton	3	1	2	0	3	0	1	2	6	1	3	2	16.67	1997–98	1999–2000	
Collingwood Warriors ‡	1	0	1	0	1	0	1	0	2	0	2	0	0.00	1996–97	1996–97	
Football Kingz	1	0	1	0	1	1	0	0	2	1	1	0	50.00	1999–2000	1999–2000	
Gippsland Falcons	7	1	3	3	8	3	1	4	15	4	4	7	26.67	1992–93	1999–2000	(Note: Record against Morwell Falcons included.)
Heidelberg United	3	2	1	0	3	0	2	1	6	2	3	1	33.33	1991–92	1993–94	
Marconi Fairfield	8	2	2	4	9	1	1	7	17	3	3	11	17.65	1991–92	1999–2000	
Melbourne Knights	9	2	2	5	8	1	0	7	17	3	2	12	17.65	1991–92	1999–2000	(Note: Record against Melbourne Croatia included.)
Northern Spirit	2	1	1	0	2	1	1	0	4	2	2	0	50.00	1998–99	1999–2000	
Parramatta Eagles	3	0	2	1	3	0	1	2	6	0	3	3	0.00	1991–92	1993–94	
Parramatta Power	1	0	0	1	1	1	0	0	2	1	0	1	50.00	1999–2000	1999–2000	
Perth Glory	4	2	0	2	4	4	0	0	8	6	0	2	75.00	1996–97	1999–2000	
Preston Makedonia	2	1	1	0	2	1	1	0	4	2	2	0	50.00	1991–92	1992–93	
South Melbourne	9	2	2	5	10	0	2	8	19	2	4	13	10.53	1991–92	1999–2000	
Sydney Olympic	9	4	3	2	8	0	3	5	17	4	6	7	23.53	1991–92	1999–2000	(Note: Record against UTS Olympic included.)
Sydney United	8	5	1	2	9	2	1	6	17	7	2	8	41.18	1991–92	1999–2000	(Note: Record against Sydney CSC included.)
Wollongong Wolves	9	2	4	3	8	2	3	3	17	4	7	6	23.53	1991–92	1999–2000	(Note: Record against Wollongong City included.)
