= Stojan Belajić =

Croatian footballer

Stojan Belaić
Personal information
- Full name: Stojan Belaić
- Date of birth: 17 April 1969 (age 57)
- Place of birth: Rijeka, SR Croatia, SFR Yugoslavia
- Height: 1.86 m (6 ft 1 in)
- Position: Defender

Senior career*
Years	Team	Apps	(Gls)
1987–1994	Rijeka	107	(2)
1994–1996	Austria Wien	48	(1)
1996–1997	União de Leiria	23	(0)
1997–1998	Energie Cottbus	3	(0)
1998–1999	FC Luzern	4	(0)
1999–2000	Apollon Smyrnis	28	(0)
2000–2002	FC Luzern	21	(0)
- * Club domestic league appearances and goals

Stojan Belaić (born 17 April 1969) is a retired footballer who played as a defender for clubs in Croatia, Austria, Portugal, Germany, Switzerland and Greece.

== Club career ==
Born in Rijeka, Belajić began playing football with local side HNK Rijeka in the Yugoslav First League. He would play for Rijeka for several seasons, making 107 league appearances for the club.

Belajić moved to Austria in July 1996, playing for FK Austria Wien for two seasons. Spells with U.D. Leiria of the Portuguese Liga, FC Energie Cottbus of the German second division and Swiss side FC Luzern followed.

He moved to Greece in July 1999, where he would play for Greek first division side Apollon Smyrnis, making 28 appearances in the Greek top flight.

He returned to Switzerland in July 2000, and finished his career with Luzern.

== Statistics ==
=== Player ===
Club performance			League		Cup		Continental		Total	
Season	Club	League	Apps	Goals	Apps	Goals	Apps	Goals	Apps	Goals
Yugoslavia			League		Yugoslav Cup		Europe		Total	
1987–88	NK Rijeka	Yugoslav First League	3	0	0	0	–		3	0
1988–89	NK Rijeka	Yugoslav First League	5	0	0	0	–		5	0
1989–90	NK Rijeka	Yugoslav First League	–		–		–		0	0
1990–91	NK Rijeka	Yugoslav First League	29	1	3	0	–		32	1
Croatia			League		Croatian Cup		Europe		Total	
1992	NK Rijeka	Prva HNL	20	0	3	0	–		23	0
1992–93	NK Rijeka	Prva HNL	25	1	4	0	–		29	1
1993–94	NK Rijeka	Prva HNL	25	0	6	0	–		31	0
NK Rijeka total			107	2	19	0	0	0	126	2

== Honours ==
Energie Cottbus

- Brandenburg Cup: 1998
