= Roberto Paliska =

Croatian footballer

Personal information
- Full name: Roberto Paliska
- Date of birth: 14 December 1963 (age 62)
- Place of birth: Rijeka, SFR Yugoslavia
- Position: Defender

Senior career*
Years	Team	Apps	(Gls)
1984–1991	Rijeka	156	(8)
1991–1993	Pierikos	57	(7)
1993–1994	WSG Wattens	23	(1)
1994–1996	Rijeka	16	(0)
1996–1997	Villacher SV		
1997–1998	Austria/VSV		
1998–1999	FC St. Veit		
- * Club domestic league appearances and goals

Roberto Paliska (born 14 December 1963 in Rijeka) is a Croatian former football player.

Although born in Rijeka, he is originally from Labin.

== Statistics ==
=== Player ===
Club performance			League		Cup		Continental		Total	
Season	Club	League	Apps	Goals	Apps	Goals	Apps	Goals	Apps	Goals
Yugoslavia			League		Yugoslav Cup		Europe		Total	
1984–85	NK Rijeka	Yugoslav First League	14	0	0	0	0	0	14	0
1985–86	NK Rijeka	Yugoslav First League	28	0	2	0	–		30	0
1986–87	NK Rijeka	Yugoslav First League	33	4	8	0	2	0	43	4
1987–88	NK Rijeka	Yugoslav First League	27	1	1	0	–		28	1
1988–89	NK Rijeka	Yugoslav First League	23	1	1	0	–		24	1
1989–90	NK Rijeka	Yugoslav First League	24	1	2	0	–		26	1
1990–91	NK Rijeka	Yugoslav First League	10	1	1	0	–		11	1
Greece			League		Greek Cup		Europe		Total	
1991–92	Pierikos	Alpha Ethniki	29	5	–		–		29	5
1992–93	Pierikos	Alpha Ethniki	28	2	–		–		28	2
Austria			League		ÖFB-Cup		Europe		Total	
1993–94	WSG Wattens	2. Liga	23	1	–		–		23	1
Croatia			League		Croatian Cup		Europe		Total	
1994–95	HNK Rijeka	Prva HNL	15	0	3	0	–		18	0
1995–96	HNK Rijeka	Prva HNL	1	0	0	0	–		1	0
Rijeka			175	8	18	0	2	0	195	8
Total			255	16	18	0	2	0	275	16
