= José Iriarte (footballer) =

Argentinian football player

Personal information
- Full name: José Luis Iriarte
- Date of birth: 10 December 1966 (age 59)
- Place of birth: Argentina
- Height: 1.80 m (5 ft 11 in)
- Position: Striker

Youth career
- Club Unión Além Progresista

Senior career*
Years	Team	Apps	(Gls)
- Club Unión Além Progresista
- Club Cipolletti
- Deportivo Armenio
1990-1991	San Lorenzo		
1991	Manly United		(12)
1991-1992	Sydney United	21	(1)
1992	Manly United	22	(7)
1992-1996	West Adelaide	65	(19)
1993	Sri Pahang (loan)		(22)
1996	Negeri Sembilan		
1997-1998	West Adelaide	10	(0)
- * Club domestic league appearances and goals as of 9 December 2025 ‡ National team caps and goals as of 9 December 2025

José Luis Iriarte (born 10 December 1966) is an Argentinian former football player. He played as a striker.

== Playing career ==
=== Club career ===
Iriarte began his career in Argentina, representing several clubs including Club Unión Além Progresista, Club Cipolletti in the Torneo del Interior, Deportivo Armenio in the Primera B Nacional, and San Lorenzo in the Argentine Primera División, before relocating to Australia.

Upon his arrival in Australia, he spent one season with Manly United, then known as Warringah Freshwater Dolphins, in the NSW Super League where he scored 12 goals, before joining NSL side Sydney United, formerly Sydney Croatia, for the 1991-92 season. After a single campaign with Sydney United, he returned to Manly United, and subsequently signed with West Adelaide in the NSL.

At the conclusion of the NSL 1992–93 season, Iriarte was loaned to Pahang FA, now known as Sri Pahang, in Malaysia. He returned to West Adelaide the following season and remained with the club until the end of the 1995-1996 season, when he once again moved to Malaysia—this time joining Negeri Sembilan during the fully professional Liga Perdana era.

Iriarte retired at the end of the NSL 1997–98 season, closing his professional career with West Adelaide.
