= Matjaž Florjančič =

Slovenian footballer

Personal information
- Date of birth: 18 October 1967 (age 59)
- Place of birth: Kranj, SFR Yugoslavia
- Height: 1.76 m (5 ft 9 1/2 in)
- Positions: Striker; winger

Youth career
- 1986–1987: Triglav

Senior career*
Years	Team	Apps	(Gls)
1987–1991	Rijeka	83	(7)
1991–1996	Cremonese	148	(20)
1996–1997	Torino	36	(8)
1997–1998	Empoli	28	(6)
1998–1999	Fidelis Andria	17	(6)
1999–2000	Alzano Virescit	29	(5)
2000–2001	Crotone	4	(1)
2001	Alzano Virescit	13	(2)
2001–2002	Pro Sesto	24	(2)

International career
1992–1999	Slovenia	20	(1)

Managerial career
- 2013–2015: Rijeka (assistant)
- 2015: Zarica
- 2017: Zarica
- * Club domestic league appearances and goals

Matjaž Florjančič (also Florijančič, born 18 October 1967 in Kranj) is a Slovenian retired association football player.

== Club career ==
Florjančič played most of his career in Italy, where he moved in 1991 to sign for Serie A club Cremonese. He then played for several other Serie A and B teams, such as Torino and Empoli. He retired in 2001, after a Serie C2 campaign with Pro Sesto.

== International career ==
Florjančič made his debut for Slovenia in a November 1992 friendly match away against Cyprus and earned a total of 20 caps, scoring 1 goal. His final international was an April 1999 friendly against Finland.

== Career statistics ==
=== Player ===
Season	Club	League	League		Cup		Europe		Total	
Season	Club	League	Apps	Goals	Apps	Goals	Apps	Goals	Apps	Goals
1986–87	Rijeka	First League	5	0	0	0	–		5	0
1987–88	Rijeka	First League	12	0	1	0	–		13	0
1988–89	Rijeka	First League	25	3	1	0	–		26	3
1989–90	Rijeka	First League	12	0	3	0	–		15	0
1990–91	Rijeka	First League	18	4	0	0	–		18	4
1991–92	Cremonese	Serie A	25	4	0	0	–		25	4
1992–93	Cremonese	Serie B	31	4	1	0	–		32	4
1993–94	Cremonese	Serie A	26	1	2	0	–		28	1
1994–95	Cremonese	Serie A	31	5	3	0	–		34	5
1995–96	Cremonese	Serie A	33	6	2	1	–		35	7
1996–97	Torino	Serie B	36	7	2	0	–		38	7
1997–98	Empoli	Serie A	28	6	0	0	–		28	6
1998–99	Fidelis Andria	Serie B	17	6	0	0	–		17	6
1999–00	Alzano Virescit	Serie B	29	5	0	0	–		29	5
2000–01	Crotone	Serie B	4	1	1	0	–		5	1
2000–01	Fidelis Andria	Serie C	13	2	0	0	–		13	2
2001–02	Pro Sesto	Serie D	24	2	0	0	–		24	2
Career total			369	55	16	1	0	0	385	56
Last Update: 17 March 2019.^{1}Source.

== See also ==
- Slovenian international players
