= Dragan Punišić =

Serbian footballer

Personal information
- Date of birth: 1 March 1966 (age 60)
- Place of birth: Belgrade, SFR Yugoslavia
- Height: 1.79 m (5 ft 10 in)
- Position: Midfielder

Senior career*
| Years | Team | Apps | (Gls) |
| 1985–1987 | Radnički Pirot | | |
| 1987–1988 | Red Star Belgrade | 11 | (1) |
| 1988–1990 | Vojvodina | 51 | (5) |
| 1990–1991 | Rijeka | 31 | (6) |
| 1991–1993 | Castellón | 61 | (10) |
| 1993–1995 | Beira-Mar | 56 | (10) |
| 1995–1998 | Farense | 51 | (8) |
| Total | | 261 | (40) |
- * Club domestic league appearances and goals

Dragan Punišić (Serbian Cyrillic: Драган Пунишић; born 1 March 1966) is a Serbian former professional footballer who played as a midfielder.

Born in Belgrade, Punišić began his career in the Yugoslav First League with Red Star Belgrade. In 1991, he moved from Rijeka to Castellón.

He later had spells with Beira-Mar and Farense in the Portuguese Liga.

He won the 1987–88 Yugoslav First League with Red Star Belgrade and the 1988–89 Yugoslav First League with FK Vojvodina.
