= Xhevdet Muriqi =

Kosovar Albanian footballer

Personal information
- Full name: Xhevdet Muriqi
- Date of birth: 4 March 1963 (age 63)
- Place of birth: Pejë, SFR Yugoslavia
- Position: Defender

Senior career*
| Years | Team | Apps | (Gls) |
| 1981–1989 | Prishtina | 82 | (6) |
| 1989–1990 | Rijeka | 2 | (0) |
| 1990–1998 | Šibenik | 199 | (15) |
| 2000–2001 | Imotska Krajina | | |
- * Club domestic league appearances and goals

Xhevdet Muriqi (Serbian Latin: Dževdet Murići) (born 4 March 1963) is a former Kosovar Albanian footballer who is best known for his time with FC Prishtina during the 1980s as part of the "Golden Generation".

== Career ==
=== Prishtina ===
Muriqi played for FC Prishtina for eight seasons in the Yugoslav First League from 1981 to 1989 together with his brother Fadil, Kujtim Shala, Fadil Vokrri and other notable players.

=== Croatia ===
In the 1989–90 season together with his older brother Fadil, he moved to NK Rijeka and played there another season in the Yugoslav First League before moving to HNK Šibenik where he spent 8 seasons. He finished his career playing for second league team NK Imotska krajina.
