= 1991–92 National Soccer League =

Australian soccer season

NSL 1991-92
- League: National Soccer League
- Sport: Association football
- Duration: 1991–92
- Number of teams: 14

NSL season
- Champions: Adelaide City
- Top scorer: Tim Bredbury; Kimon Taliadoros (15 each)

National Soccer League seasons
- ← 1990–91 1992–93 →

The 1991–92 National Soccer League season, was the 16th season of the National Soccer League in Australia.

== Overview ==
The 1991/92 National Soccer League season saw fourteen teams compete with Adelaide City winning the championship after defeating Melbourne Croatia in the grand final on a penalty shootout 4-2 after the scores were locked at 0-0 after full-time and extra time at Olympic Park, Melbourne in front of 15,463 fans. Melbourne Croatia were named premiers after finishing the home-and-away season on top of the table one point clear ahead of Sydney Olympic.

This was the only season socceroos goalkeeper Mark Bosnich, strikers Paul Agostino and John Aloisi would compete in the National Soccer League. Bosnich, signed from Manchester United, would make five appearances for his junior club Sydney Croatia before heading back to England to play for Aston Villa.Agostino, at age sixteen, would make seventeen appearances and score six goals with West Adelaide before heading to Switzerland to play for BSC Young Boys and John Aloisi would make one appearance for Adelaide City before heading to Standard Liège in Belgium. Other significant signings included former Hong Kong international striker Tim Bredbury signing with Sydney Olympic who would finish the season joint top goal scorer with fifteen goals, and Albanian Fadil Muriqi signing with Sydney Croatia, becoming the first ever Albanian to play in the National Soccer League.

This would be the final season in the National Soccer League for A.P.I.A. Leichhardt as they fell into financial troubles and went down to the NSW Super League in 1993.

== Regular season ==
=== League table ===
Pos	Team	Pld	W	D	L	GF	GA	GD	Pts	Qualification or relegation
1	Melbourne Croatia	26	14	7	5	45	26	+19	35	Qualification for the Finals series
2	Sydney Olympic	26	12	10	4	38	27	+11	34	Qualification for the Finals series
3	South Melbourne	26	13	5	8	51	28	+23	31	Qualification for the Finals series
4	Adelaide City (C)	26	10	9	7	26	23	+3	29	Qualification for the Finals series
5	Wollongong City	26	9	10	7	24	17	+7	28	Qualification for the Finals series
6	Brisbane United	26	8	10	8	31	35	−4	26	
7	Marconi Fairfield	26	10	5	11	33	31	+2	25	
8	APIA Leichhardt (R)	26	7	11	8	26	28	−2	25	Relegation to the NSW Division 1
9	Heidelberg United	26	8	8	10	28	33	−5	24	
10	Parramatta Eagles	26	6	11	9	24	24	0	23	
11	Newcastle Breakers	26	7	8	11	28	39	−11	22	
12	Sydney Croatia	26	6	9	11	22	33	−11	21	
13	West Adelaide	26	7	7	12	25	46	−21	21	
14	Preston Makedonia	26	5	10	11	21	32	−11	20	

Updated to match(es) played on unknown. Source: rsssf.com
Rules for classification: 1) points; 2) goal difference; 3) number of goals scored.
(C) Champions; (R) Relegated

== Finals series ==
Elimination and qualifying Finals
2	Sydney Olympic	0
3	South Melbourne	2
4	Adelaide City	1
5	Wollongong Wolves	0

Semi-finals
1	Melbourne Croatia (p)	0 (5)
3	South Melbourne	0 (3)
2	Sydney Olympic	1
4	Adelaide City	2

Preliminary Final
3	South Melbourne	0
4	Adelaide City	2

Grand Final
1	Melbourne Croatia	0 (2)
4	Adelaide City (p)	0 (4)

== Individual awards ==
- Player of the Year: Josip Biskic (Melbourne Croatia)
- U-21 Player of the Year: Kevin Muscat (Heidelberg United)
- Top Scorer(s): Tim Bredbury (Sydney Olympic) and Kimon Taliadoros (South Melbourne) – 15 goals
- Coach of the Year: David Ratcliffe (Wollongong City)
