= Mladen Romić =

Croatian footballer

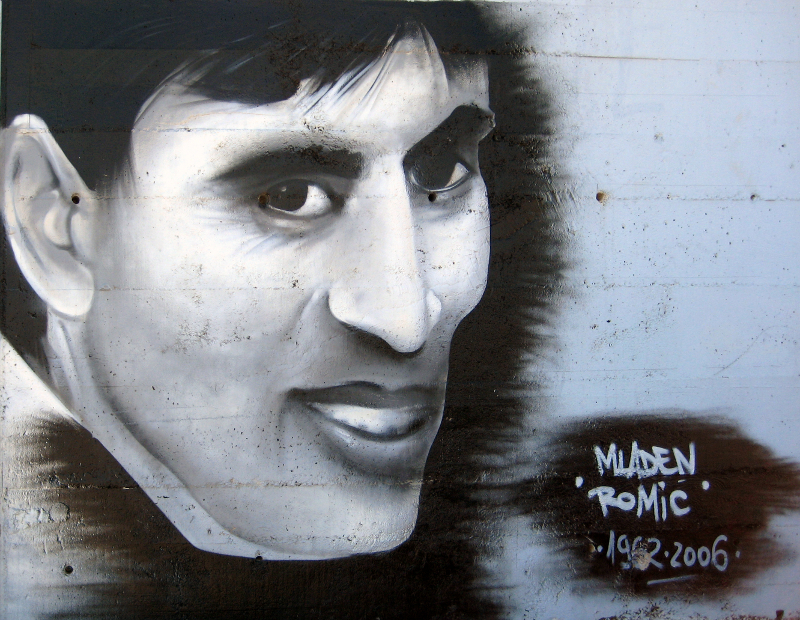

Personal information
- Full name: Mladen Romić
- Date of birth: 23 May 1962
- Place of birth: Livno, FPR Yugoslavia
- Date of death: 19 January 2006 (aged 43)
- Place of death: Rijeka, Croatia
- Position: Defender

Youth career
- Troglav Livno

Senior career*
Years	Team	Apps	(Gls)
1979	Troglav Livno		
1979–1981	Dubrava		
1981–1985	NK Zagreb		
1985–1988	Mladost Petrinja		
1988–1994	Rijeka	122	(3)
1994–1995	FC Bremerhaven	25	(0)
1995–1996	Zadar	12	(0)
1996–1998	Rijeka	57	(0)
1998–2002	Pomorac Kostrena		

International career
1992	Croatia	3	(0)
- * Club domestic league appearances and goals

Mladen Romić (23 May 1962 – 19 January 2006) was a Croatian football player.

== Club career ==
As a player, he spent much of his career, nine seasons in total, with HNK Rijeka. While playing for NK Pomorac in 2002, at the age of 39, he became the oldest player to have played in Prva HNL. Since then, he has been overtaken by Davor Vugrinec and Jakov Surać.

== International career ==
He made his debut for Croatia in a July 1992 friendly match away against Australia and earned a total of 3 caps, scoring no goals, all during the tour of Australia. His final international was a week later against the same opposition.

== Post-playing career ==
Between 2003 and his premature death due to illness in 2006, he was sporting director of HNK Rijeka. Rijeka's fans, Armada Rijeka, created a mural near Stadion Kantrida in his honour to commemorate his contribution to the club.

== Honours ==
Bremerhaven

- Verbandsliga Bremen: 1993-94

NK Zadar

- Prva B HNL promotion: 1995-96

NK Pomorac

- Druga HNL promotion: 2000-01
- 3. HNL - West: 1998-99

Individual

- NK Rijeka player of the season: 1991-92

== Statistics ==
=== Player ===
Club performance			League		Cup		Total	
Season	Club	League	Apps	Goals	Apps	Goals	Apps	Goals
Yugoslavia			League		Yugoslav Cup		Total	
1988–89	NK Rijeka	Yugoslav First League	30	0	1	0	31	0
1989–90	NK Rijeka	Yugoslav First League	26	1	3	0	29	1
1990–91	NK Rijeka	Yugoslav First League	12	0	4	1	16	1
Croatia			League		Croatian Cup		Total	
1992	NK Rijeka	Prva HNL	14	1	3	0	17	1
1992–93	NK Rijeka	Prva HNL	28	0	4	0	32	0
1993–94	NK Rijeka	Prva HNL	13	0	1	0	14	0
Germany			League		DFB-Pokal		Total	
1993–94	FC Bremerhaven	Verbandsliga Bremen	–		–		0	0
1994–95	FC Bremerhaven	Regionalliga Nord	25	0	0	0	25	0
Croatia			League		Croatian Cup		Total	
1995–96	NK Zadar	Prva B HNL	12	0	4	0	16	0
1995–96	HNK Rijeka	Prva HNL	10	0	0	0	10	0
1996–97	HNK Rijeka	Prva HNL	26	0	2	0	28	0
1997–98	HNK Rijeka	Prva HNL	21	0	1	0	22	0
1998–99	Pomorac Kostena	Treća HNL - West	–		–		0	0
1999–00	Pomorac Kostena	Druga HNL	–		–		0	0
2000–01	Pomorac Kostena	Druga HNL	–		–		0	0
2001–02	Pomorac Kostena	Prva HNL	18	0	2	0	20	0
Rijeka			180	2	19	1	199	3
Total			235	2	25	1	260	3
