= Vlado Miloševič =

Slovenian footballer

Personal information
- Full name: Vlado Miloševič
- Date of birth: 4 June 1968 (age 58)
- Place of birth: Ljubljana, SFR Yugoslavia
- Position: Forward

Youth career
- Ilirija

Senior career*
Years	Team	Apps	(Gls)
1988	Rijeka	7	(0)
1989–1991	Olimpija	16	(1)
1991–1992	Ljubljana	36	(24)
1993–1994	Beltinci	21	(19)

International career
1992–1994	Slovenia	2	(1)

Managerial career
- Ilirija
- * Club domestic league appearances and goals

Vlado Miloševič (born 4 June 1968) is a retired Slovenian football striker. In 1992, when playing for Ljubljana, he was selected as the Slovenian footballer of the year.

He was capped twice by Slovenia: away against Cyprus in 1992 and away against Malta in 1994.
