= Fabijan Komljenović =

Croatian footballer (born 1968)

Personal information
- Date of birth: 16 January 1968 (age 58)
- Place of birth: Zagreb, SFR Yugoslavia
- Position: Midfielder

Team information
- Current team: Tractor (assistant)

Youth career
- –1988: Dinamo Zagreb

Senior career*
Years	Team	Apps	(Gls)
1986–1989	Dinamo Zagreb	11	(0)
1990–1991	Rijeka	50	(13)
1992–1993	Zagreb	29	(5)
1993–1995	Istra	34	(7)
1994	→ Schalke 04 (loan)	2	(0)
1995–1996	Genk	32	(14)
1996–1997	Zagreb	15	(3)
1997–1998	Harelbeke	14	(0)
1998–1999	Hrvatski Dragovoljac	15	(3)
1999–2000	Marsonia	34	(7)
2000	Pohang Steelers	7	(0)

International career
1991	Croatia	1	(1)

Managerial career
- 2004–2007: Zagreb (assistant)
- 2008–2012: Dinamo Zagreb (assistant)
- 2012–2013: Trešnjevka
- 2013: Lekenik
- 2015–2017: Dinamo Zagreb (youth)
- 2017–2018: Dinamo Zagreb II (assistant)
- 2018: Dinamo Zagreb (assistant)
- 2018–2019: Olimpija Ljubljana (sporting director)
- 2020: Admira Wacker (assistant)
- 2021–: Tractor (assistant)
- * Club domestic league appearances and goals

Fabijan Komljenović (born 16 January 1968) is a Croatian retired football player.

== Playing career ==
=== Club ===
While playing for Rijeka, he was nicknamed the "Caniggia from Kantrida" due to his style of play and physical appearance.

=== International ===
He made his international debut against Slovenia at Murska Sobota on 19 June 1991, where he scored the winning goal (0–1). This was his single appearance for the Croatia national football team. It was unofficial however, since Croatia was still part of Yugoslavia at the time.

== Coaching career ==
Komljenović retired at the end of 2000 and began his coaching career at Davor Šuker's Soccer Academy.

== Career statistics ==
Club performance			League		Cup		Continental		Total	
Season	Club	League	Apps	Goals	Apps	Goals	Apps	Goals	Apps	Goals
Yugoslavia			League		Yugoslav Cup		Europe		Total	
1985–86	Dinamo Zagreb	Yugoslav First League	1	0	0	0	–		1	0
1986–87	Dinamo Zagreb	Yugoslav First League	–		–		–		0	0
1987–88	Dinamo Zagreb	Yugoslav First League	–		–		–		0	0
1988–89	Dinamo Zagreb	Yugoslav First League	6	0	1	0	0	0	7	0
1989–90	Dinamo Zagreb	Yugoslav First League	4	0	1	0	0	0	5	0
1989–90	NK Rijeka	Yugoslav First League	15	4	0	0	–		15	4
1990–91	NK Rijeka	Yugoslav First League	35	9	5	3	–		40	12
Croatia			League		Croatian Cup		Europe		Total	
1992	NK Zagreb	Prva HNL	14	3	0	0	–		14	3
1992–93	NK Zagreb	Prva HNL	15	2	3	1	–		18	3
1993–94	NK Istra	Prva HNL	16	5	3	3	–		19	8
Germany			League		DFB-Pokal		Europe		Total	
1993–94	Schalke 04	Bundesliga	2	0	0	0	0	0	2	0
Croatia			League		Croatian Cup		Europe		Total	
1994–95	NK Istra	Prva HNL	14	2	2	0	–		16	2
Belgium			League		Belgian Cup		Europe		Total	
1995–96	Genk	Belgian Second Division	32	14	0	0	–		32	14
Croatia			League		Croatian Cup		Europe		Total	
1996–97	NK Zagreb	Prva HNL	15	3	0	0	–		15	3
Belgium			League		Belgian Cup		Europe		Total	
1997–98	K.R.C. Harelbeke	Belgian First Division	14	0	1	0	–		15	0
Croatia			League		Croatian Cup		Europe		Total	
1998–99	Hrvatski Dragovoljac	Prva HNL	15	3	0	0	0	0	15	3
1999–00	NK Marsonia	Druga HNL	34	7	1	1	–		35	8
South Korea			League		FA Cup		Asia		Total	
2000	Pohang Steelers	K League	7	0	0	0	–		15	3
Total			239	52	17	8	0	0	256	60
