= Miro Stipić =

Croatian footballer

Personal information
- Full name: Miroslav Stipić
- Date of birth: 15 August 1962 (age 64)
- Place of birth: Šuica, Bosnia and Herzegovina
- Position: Midfielder

Senior career*
| Years | Team | Apps | (Gls) |
| 1981-1983 | Dinamo Zagreb | | |
| 1983-1984 | NK Zagreb | | |
| 1984-1988 | Iskra Bugojno | | |
| 1988-1991 | Rijeka | 68 | (4) |
| 1991-1992 | Sydney United | 26 | (1) |
| 1992 | Canberra Croatia | | |
| 1992-1994 | SK Viktoria Aschaffenburg | | |
| 1994-1995 | Kickers Offenbach | 2 | (0) |

Managerial career
- 2007-2008: NK Sesvete Under 19's
- 2010-2011: NK HAŠK 1903 Under 19's
- 2011-2012: NK Sesvete Under 17's
- 2014-2016: NK Sesvete Under 17's
- * Club domestic league appearances and goals as of 26 September 2023 ‡ National team caps and goals as of 21 September 2023

Miro Stipić (born 15 August 1962) is a former Croatian football player. He played as a midfielder.

== Career ==
Stipić between 1981 and 1991 played in the Yugoslav First League and Yugoslav Second League for clubs Dinamo Zagreb, NK Zagreb, Iskra Bugojno, and Rijeka. At the end of the 1990/91 season with Rijeka, Miro went to Australia and joined Australian National Soccer League side, Sydney United then known as Sydney Croatia. He was joined by fellow Rijeka teammate Fadil Muriqi. Miro spent one season with Sydney United before briefly joining Canberra Croatia, then known as Canberra Metro, in the NSW Super League but a family crisis saw Miro quit the club after three weeks and head back to Europe. He ended up joining German club SK Viktoria Aschaffenburg, and later Kickers Offenbach.

=== Manager Career ===
Between 2007 and 2016, Miro served as head coach of the NK Sesvete Under-17 and Under-19 academy teams. He also held a brief tenure as manager of the NK HAŠK 1903 Under-19 squad.
