= Slobodan Grubor =

Croatian football manager

Personal information
- Date of birth: 9 September 1968 (age 58)
- Place of birth: Rijeka, Croatia
- Height: 1.88 m (6 ft 2 in)
- Position: Centre-back

Senior career*
Years	Team	Apps	(Gls)
1991–1993	Rijeka	17	(0)
1993–1994	LASK		
1994–1996	SV Oberwart II		
1996–1999	SK Vorwärts Steyr		
1999–2000	Schwarz-Weiß Bregenz		
2000–2004	DSV Leoben		
2005–2006	Kapfenberger SV		

Managerial career
- 2010: FC Lustenau 07
- 2013: Wolfsberger AC
- 2019–2020: NK Aluminij
- 2023–: HNK Orijent
- * Club domestic league appearances and goals

Slobodan Grubor (born 9 September 1968) is a Croatian football manager and former player who manages HNK Orijent.

== Early life ==
Grubor was born in 1968 in Rijeka, Croatia. He obtained Austrian citizenship.

== Career ==
Grubor played as a centre-back.

He obtained his professional coaching license in Bosnia and Herzegovina. In 2019, he was appointed manager of Slovenian side NK Aluminij.

== Personal life ==
Grubor has been described as a "quiet tinkerer" in terms of management style. He has been nicknamed "Bobo".
