= Zoran Vujčić =

Croatian footballer

Personal information
- Date of birth: 2 October 1961 (age 65)
- Place of birth: Čabar, SFR Yugoslavia
- Position: Forward

Senior career*
Years	Team	Apps	(Gls)
1980–1981	Hajduk	6	(0)
1981–1982	Solin	24	(6)
1982–1986	Dinamo Vinkovci	102	(20)
1986–1990	Rijeka	93	(16)
1990–1992	Levante	51	(7)
1995–1998	Zadarkomerc	68	(15)
Total		344	(49)
- * Club domestic league appearances and goals

Zoran Vujčić (born 1 October 1961) is a Croatian retired footballer who played as a forward.

During his club career he played for Hajduk, Solin, Cibalia, Rijeka, Levante and Zadar.
