= Mladen Žganjer =

Croatian footballer and coach

Personal information
- Full name: Mladen Žganjer
- Date of birth: 17 May 1966 (age 60)
- Place of birth: Rijeka, SR Croatia, Yugoslavia
- Position: Goalkeeper

Senior career*
Years	Team	Apps	(Gls)
- Orijent
1989–1998	Rijeka	146	(0)
1998–1999	Spittal/Drau	37	(0)
2001–2003	Pomorac Kostrena		
- * Club domestic league appearances and goals

Mladen Žganjer (born 17 May 1966) is a Croatian professional football coach and former player. He currently serves as a goalkeeping coach for the Iran national football team under head coach Dragan Skočić.

== Career ==
Born in Rijeka, as a goalkeeper he spent much of his career with HNK Rijeka, playing in both the Yugoslav First League and Prva HNL. During the 1993-94 Prva HNL season he did not concede a goal for 622 minutes, making him the club's record holder in top tier competitions. Before finishing his career, he played for SV Spittal in Austria, before returning to Croatia, where he played for NK Pomorac Kostrena.

== Career statistics ==
Club	Season	League	League		Cup		Europe		Total	
Club	Season	League	Apps	Goals	Apps	Goals	Apps	Goals	Apps	Goals
NK Rijeka	1989–90	Yugoslav First League	1	0	–		–		1	0
NK Rijeka	1990–91	Yugoslav First League	2	0	2	0	–		4	0
NK Rijeka	1992	Prva HNL	22	0	4	0	–		26	0
NK Rijeka	1992–93	Prva HNL	24	0	3	0	–		27	0
NK Rijeka	1993–94	Prva HNL	33	0	8	0	–		41	0
NK Rijeka	1994–95	Prva HNL	26	0	3	0	–		29	0
HNK Rijeka	1995–96	Prva HNL	18	0	5	0	–		23	0
HNK Rijeka	1996–97	Prva HNL	14	0	2	0	–		16	0
HNK Rijeka	1997–98	Prva HNL	6	0	1	0	–		7	0
SV Spittal	1998–99	2. Liga	37	0	2	0	–		39	0
Pomorac Kostrena	2001–02	Prva HNL	0	0	1	0	–		1	0
Pomorac Kostrena	2002–03	Prva HNL	0	0	0	0	–		0	0
Career total			183	0	31	0	0	0	214	0
