= NK Pazinka =

Croatian football club

Pazinka
- Full name: Nogometni klub Pazinka
- Founded: 1948 (as SD Pazin)
- Ground: Igralište NK Pazinka
- Capacity: 2,500
- Chairman: Dragan Jovičić
- Manager: Saša Lukman
- League: 3. HNL
- 2016–17: 4. HNL Rijeka, 1st (promoted)
- Website: https://instagram.com/nkpazinka?igshid=MzRlODBiNWFlZA== http://www.nkpazinka.hr
Home colours	Away colours

NK Pazinka is a Croatian football club based in the town of Pazin in Istria. Founded in 1948, their greatest success was competing in the Croatian top flight 1. HNL for two seasons between 1992 and 1994. They are currently competing in the Croatian Third Football League.

== History ==
The club was established in 1948 as part of the SD Pazin sports society. They spent the next few decades in relative obscurity contesting Istrian regional league competitions within the Yugoslav league system. In 1970 the club was renamed NK Pazinka, after the local textile factory which began sponsoring the club. In 1985 they won promotion to Croatian League West, one of several regional fourth-level divisions in SR Croatia. In spite of winning the division in the 1989–90 season, Pazinka failed to progress further up the football pyramid and remained at fourth level until the breakup of Yugoslavia in 1991.

Following Croatia's independence, Pazinka entered one of the three regional divisions of the newly formed 2. HNL second-level competition in the shortened 1992 season and finished first, gaining promotion to the national top level for the first time in their history for the 1992–93 season. They finished 11th out of 16 clubs, level on points with five other clubs. There was no relegation that season due to the ongoing war. The following year the league was expanded to 18 clubs, with Pazinka finishing 15th in the 1993–94 season, inside the relegation zone.

Notable players who appeared for Pazinka during this spell included Dado Pršo (later with AS Monaco and Rangers), Tonči Gabrić (later with Hajduk Split), Zoran Škerjanc (formerly of Dinamo Zagreb and Recreativo Huelva) and Damir Desnica (one of the very few deaf professional footballers, formerly with Rijeka and Kortrijk).

The club then spent several seasons playing second-level football before slipping further down to third level in the 1997–98 season, which also coincided with the bankruptcy of the Pazinka textile factory. After spending a few years struggling to stay in third level they slipped down to fourth level in 2003 and then again to fifth level in 2004. However, Pazinka won the fifth level Istria Group and earned promotion back to 4. HNL in 2007–08.
