= Elvis Scoria =

Croatian football player and manager (born 1971)

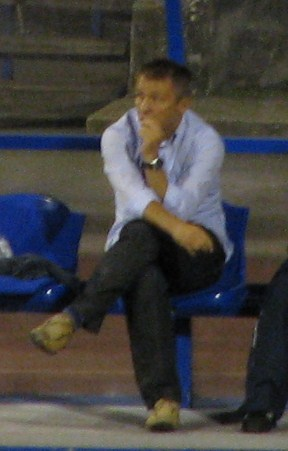

Personal information
- Date of birth: 5 July 1971 (age 55)
- Place of birth: Pula, SR Croatia, SFR Yugoslavia
- Position: Forward

Senior career*
Years	Team	Apps	(Gls)
1989–1994	Rijeka	75	(13)
1994	Dinamo Zagreb	6	(1)
1995–1996	Istra	62	(19)
1997	Zagreb	15	(5)
1997–1999	Lleida	18	(1)
1999–2000	Istra	7	(0)

Managerial career
- 2002–2004: Pula 1856
- 2004–2005: Rijeka
- 2006: Slaven Belupo
- 2007–2009: Istra 1961
- 2010–2011: Rijeka
- 2011–2012: Kavala
- 2012–2013: Rijeka
- 2014: Slaven Belupo
- 2017: Henan Jianye (assistant)
- * Club domestic league appearances and goals

Elvis Scoria (born 5 July 1971) is a Croatian former football player and manager. He played for HNK Rijeka, Dinamo Zagreb (then called Croatia Zagreb), NK Istra, NK Zagreb and for Spanish club UE Lleida.

== Playing career ==
As a player, Scoria appeared in two Cup finals in 1994 with HNK Rijeka and in 1997 with NK Zagreb losing both the finals.

== Managerial career ==
Scoria has also appeared in three Cup finals as a manager in 2003 with NK Uljanik, 2005 with HNK Rijeka and in 2007 with NK Slaven Belupo. He also managed Rijeka in the 2005 Croatian Super Cup where they lost 1–0 in extra time from a goal by Niko Kranjčar.

He was announced manager of RNK Split in February 2017, succeeding Vjekoslav Lokica, only for him to change his mind after two days and Bruno Akrapović stepped in instead.

== Career statistics ==
Appearances and goals by club, season and competition
Club	Season	League			National cup (Note: Includes Yugoslav Cup, Croatian Cup, Copa del Rey.)		League cup (Note: Includes Croatian Super Cup.)		Continental		Total	
Club	Season	Division	Apps	Goals	Apps	Goals	Apps	Goals	Apps	Goals	Apps	Goals
Rijeka	1989–90	Yugoslav First League	25	1	3	0	—		—		28	1
Rijeka	1990–91	Yugoslav First League	0	0	0	0	—		—		0	0
Rijeka	1992	Prva HNL	4	2	0	0	—		—		4	2
Rijeka	1992–93	Prva HNL	29	8	3	1	—		—		32	9
Rijeka	1993–94	Prva HNL	17	2	8	0	—		—		25	2
Rijeka	Total		75	13	14	1	0	0	0	0	89	14
Croatia Zagreb	1994–95	Prva HNL	6	1	2	0	—		1	0	9	1
Istra	1994–95	Prva HNL	15	4	—		—		—		15	4
Istra	1995–96	Prva HNL	32	12	2	0	—		—		34	12
Istra	1996–97	Prva HNL	15	3	1	0	—		—		16	3
Istra	Total		62	19	3	0	0	0	0	0	55	19
Zagreb	1996–97	Prva HNL	12	2	3	4	—		—		15	6
Zagreb	1997–98	Prva HNL	3	3	1	0	—		1	0	5	3
Zagreb	Total		15	5	4	4	0	0	1	0	20	9
Lleida	1997–98	Segunda División	18	1	1	0	—		—		19	1
Lleida	1998–99	Segunda División	0	0	0	0	—		—		0	0
Lleida	Total		18	1	1	0	0	0	0	0	19	1
Istra	1999–00	Prva HNL	7	0	0	0	—		—		7	0
Career total			183	39	24	5	0	0	2	0	209	45

== Managerial statistics ==
As of 4 November 2017

Team	From	To	Record				
Team	From	To	G	W	D	L	Win %
Pula 1856	2002	2004	74	43	17	14	58.11
HNK Rijeka	2004	2005	61	27	20	14	44.26
NK Slaven Belupo	2006	2007	55	26	14	15	47.27
NK Istra 1961	2007	2009	63	36	14	13	57.14
HNK Rijeka	2010	2011	18	3	9	6	16.67
HNK Rijeka	2012	2013	24	10	7	7	41.67
NK Slaven Belupo	2014	2014	30	7	5	18	23.33
Total			325	152	86	87	46.77

== Honours ==
NK Istra 1961

- Druga HNL - South: 2003–04
- Druga HNL: 2008–09

HNK Rijeka

- Croatian Cup: 2005
