= Zoran Ban =

Croatian footballer (born 1973)

Personal information
- Date of birth: 27 May 1973 (age 53)
- Place of birth: Rijeka, SFR Yugoslavia
- Height: 1.86 m (6 ft 1 in)
- Position: Striker

Senior career*
Years	Team	Apps	(Gls)
1990–1993	Rijeka	38	(11)
1993–1996	Juventus	2	(0)
1994–1995	→ Belenenses (loan)	9	(2)
1995–1996	→ Boavista (loan)	16	(4)
1996–1997	Pescara	9	(1)
1997–1999	Mouscron	42	(21)
1999–2001	Racing Genk	37	(12)
2001–2003	Mouscron	26	(10)
2003–2004	Mons	22	(4)
2004	Foggia	5	(2)
Total		206	(67)

International career
1994	Croatia U21	1	(0)
- * Club domestic league appearances and goals

Zoran Ban (born 27 May 1973) is a Croatian retired professional footballer who played as a striker.

He played a match against Estonia in 1994 for the U-21 team of Croatia.

== Career statistics ==
=== Club ===
Appearances and goals by club, season and competition
Club	Season	League			National cup (Note: Includes Yugoslav Cup, Croatian Cup, Coppa Italia, Taça de Portugal, Belgian Cup.)		Continental		Other		Total	
Club	Season	Division	Apps	Goals	Apps	Goals	Apps	Goals	Apps	Goals	Apps	Goals
Rijeka	1990–91	Yugoslav First League	1	0	0	0	–		–		1	0
Rijeka	1992	Prva HNL	12	4	3	0	–		–		15	4
Rijeka	1992–93	Prva HNL	25	8	4	0	–		–		29	8
Juventus	1993–94	Serie A	2	0	1	0	2	0	–		5	0
Belenenses (loan)	1994–95	Primeira Liga	9	2	1	0	–		–		10	2
Boavista (loan)	1995–96	Primeira Liga	16	4	0	0	–		–		16	4
Pescara	1996–97	Serie B	9	1	0	0	–		–		9	1
Mouscron	1997–98	Belgian First Division	16	5	0	0	2	0	–		17	5
Mouscron	1998–99	Belgian First Division	25	16	0	0	–		–		25	16
Genk	1999–2000	Belgian First Division	16	7	4	4	1	0	–		21	11
Genk	2000–01	Belgian First Division	21	5	4	1	2	0	1 (Note: Appearance in Belgian Super Cup)	0	28	6
Mouscron	2001–02	Belgian First Division	25	10	4	1	–		–		29	11
Mouscron	2002–03	Belgian First Division	1	0	0	0	–		–		1	0
Mons	2003–04	Belgian First Division	22	4	0	0	–		–		22	4
Foggia	2004–05	Serie C1/B	5	2	0	0	–		–		9	1
Career total			205	68	21	6	1	0	7	0	234	74

== Honours ==
Genk

- Belgian Cup: 1999–2000
