= Boris Ekmeščić =

Croatian footballer

Personal information
- Date of birth: 10 November 1965 (age 60)
- Height: 1.93 m (6 ft 4 in)
- Position: Forward

Senior career*
Years	Team	Apps	(Gls)
1982–1984	NK Zagreb		
1988–1991	Rijeka	36	(7)
1991–1992	Grazer AK	36	(9)
1992–1993	Union Berlin	2	(0)
1993–1994	VfB Oldenburg	54	(33)
1996–1997	FC Gütersloh	39	(9)
1997	LR Ahlen	18	(4)
1998–1999	BV Cloppenburg		

Managerial career
- 2007–2008: SV Wilhelmshaven (assistant)
- 2008–2009: SV Wilhelmshaven
- 2016–2017: TSV Oldenburg
- * Club domestic league appearances and goals

Boris Ekmeščić (born 10 November 1964) is a Croatian retired footballer who played as a forward. He later worked as a manager.
