= Dušan Kljajić =

Serbian football manager and player

Personal information
- Full name: Dušan Kljajić
- Date of birth: 12 October 1963 (age 63)
- Place of birth: Belgrade, SR Serbia, SFR Yugoslavia
- Height: 1.84 m (6 ft 0 in)
- Position: Defender

Youth career
- Red Star Belgrade

Senior career*
Years	Team	Apps	(Gls)
1984	Galenika Zemun	7	(0)
1984–1985	Maribor	31	(0)
1985	OFK Kikinda	17	(1)
1986	OFK Beograd	2	(0)
1986–1988	Rudar Ljubija		
1988–1991	Rijeka	86	(1)
1991	Radnički Beograd	1	(0)
1991–1992	Samsunspor	10	(0)
1993–1994	Obilić	2+	(0+)
1994–1995	Beograd		
1995–1996	Radnički Kragujevac		
1996–1999	Sartid Smederevo	83	(4)
Total		237+	(6+)

Managerial career
- 2009: Bežanija
- 2010: Novi Pazar
- 2010–2012: Sopot
- 2012–2013: Red Star Belgrade (first-team coach)
- 2014: Bežanija
- 2015–2016: Donji Srem
- 2016: Sinđelić Beograd
- 2017–2019: Nakhon Ratchasima (assistant)
- 2020: Budućnost Dobanovci
- 2020–2021: Radnički Sremska Mitrovica
- 2023–2024: Omladinac Novi Banovci
- 2024-2025: Sinđelić Beograd
- * Club domestic league appearances and goals

Dušan Kljajić (Serbian Cyrillic: Душан Кљајић; born 12 October 1963) is a Serbian football manager and former player.

== Playing career ==
After coming through the youth system of Red Star Belgrade, Kljajić was gaining senior football experience at Galenika Zemun, Maribor, OFK Kikinda, and OFK Beograd. He later spent three seasons with Yugoslav First League club Rijeka from 1988 to 1991. After a very brief spell with Radnički Beograd, Kljajić moved abroad to Turkey to play for Samsunspor.

== Managerial career ==
After hanging up his boots, Kljajić served as manager of numerous Serbian First League clubs, including Bežanija (two spells), Novi Pazar (January–March 2010), Donji Srem, Sinđelić Beograd, Budućnost Dobanovci, and Radnički Sremska Mitrovica (September 2020–March 2021).

== Personal life ==
Kljajić is the father of fellow footballer Filip Kljajić.
