= Tonči Gabrić =

Croatian footballer (1961–2024)

Personal information
- Date of birth: 11 November 1961
- Place of birth: Split, PR Croatia, FPR Yugoslavia
- Date of death: 28 October 2024 (aged 62)
- Place of death: Split, Croatia
- Height: 1.86 m (6 ft 1 in)
- Position: Goalkeeper

Senior career*
Years	Team	Apps	(Gls)
1979–1981	RNK Split		
1981–1982	Solin	8	(0)
1982–1985	RNK Split	31	(0)
1985–1987	Čelik Zenica	24	(0)
1987–1988	Hajduk Split	2	(0)
1988–1991	Rijeka	92	(0)
1991–1993	PAOK	43	(0)
1993–1994	Pazinka	12	(0)
1994–1999	Hajduk Split	102	(0)
Total		306	(0)

International career
1990–1997	Croatia	9	(0)
- * Club domestic league appearances and goals

Tonči Gabrić (11 November 1961 – 28 October 2024) was a Croatian professional footballer who played as a goalkeeper.

== Club career ==
Gabrić started his career in RNK Split. He played for Čelik Zenica before moving to HNK Rijeka where he was the team captain. After the dissolution of Yugoslavia, he played in Greece with PAOK, before returning to Croatia where he played for Pazinka for a season, before ending his career at Hajduk Split.

== International career ==
Gabrić made his debut for Croatia in an October 1990 friendly match against the United States, coming on as a 70th-minute substitute for Dražen Ladić. As Croatia was still part of Yugoslavia at the time, the game is deemed unofficial. He earned a total of nine caps (two of them unofficial). He was the regular reserve goalkeeper of the national team between 1990 and 1997 and was part of the Euro 1996 squad. His final international was the September 1997 World Cup qualification match away against Denmark.

== Personal life and death ==
His son Drago is also a footballer, as is his twin sister Paškvalina who has earned 10 caps for the national team.

Gabrić died in Split on 28 October 2024, at the age of 62.

== Honours ==
=== Player ===
RNK Split

- Croatian Republic League – South: 1983–84

Hajduk Split

- Croatian First League: 1994–95
- Croatian Cup: 1994–95
- Croatian Super Cup: 1994

== Orders ==
- Order of Danica Hrvatska with face of Franjo Bučar – 1995
