= Dubravko Pavličić =

Croatian footballer

Personal information
- Date of birth: 28 November 1967
- Place of birth: Zagreb, SR Croatia, SFR Yugoslavia (modern Croatia)
- Date of death: 4 April 2012 (aged 44)
- Place of death: Elche, Spain
- Height: 1.85 m (6 ft 1 in)
- Position: Centre back

Youth career
- Radnik Velika Gorica

Senior career*
Years	Team	Apps	(Gls)
1987–1989	Dinamo Zagreb	56	(2)
1990–1994	Rijeka	104	(2)
1994–1997	Hércules	95	(8)
1997–2000	Salamanca	57	(1)
2000–2001	Racing Ferrol	29	(2)
Total		321	(14)

International career
1987	Yugoslavia U20	6	(0)
1992–1997	Croatia	22	(0)
Medal record
Representing Yugoslavia
Gold medal – first place	FIFA U-20 World Cup	1987
- * Club domestic league appearances and goals

Dubravko Pavličić (28 November 1967 – 4 April 2012) was a Croatian footballer who played as a central defender.

== Club career ==
Born in Zagreb, Socialist Republic of Croatia, Socialist Federal Republic of Yugoslavia (modern Croatia), Pavličić started playing professionally for local NK Dinamo, being irregularly used over the course of three seasons. He developed into a top division player with NK Rijeka, helping it to two sixth-place finishes and one fourth in the newly founded Croatian First Football League; in the 1993–94 Croatian Cup, he scored the game's only goal in the second leg of the final, albeit in an eventual 1–2 aggregate loss.

In the 1994, summer Pavličić moved to Spain and signed for Hércules CF, in Segunda División, winning promotion to La Liga in his second year and netting a career-best six goals in 38 games in the following season, which nonetheless ended in relegation, with the player scoring in both games against FC Barcelona (3–2 win at the Camp Nou and 2–1 success at home). He stayed in the top level with UD Salamanca, dropping down a division in 1999.

In the 2000 off-season, 32-year-old Pavličić signed for Racing de Ferrol – division two – retiring at the end of the campaign. He settled in the nation subsequently, also playing amateur football for club Sporting Plaza in the Alicante area.

== International career ==
Pavličić played for Croatia for five years, gaining a total of 22 caps. His debut came on 8 July 1992 in a 1–3 friendly loss with Australia in Adelaide, and he was selected for the squad that appeared at UEFA Euro 1996, playing two group stage games (one minute against Turkey, full match against Portugal) in an eventual quarter final exit. His final international was a June 1997 Kirin Cup match against Turkey.

Previously, Pavličić was a member of the highly talented Yugoslavia under-20 team that won the 1987 FIFA World Youth Championship in Chile, playing all the games in the tournament.

== Death ==
Pavličić died of pancreatic cancer on 4 April 2012 in Elche, aged 44.

== Career statistics ==
=== Club statistics ===
Club performance			League		Cup		League Cup		Continental		Total	
Season	Club	League	Apps	Goals	Apps	Goals	Apps	Goals	Apps	Goals	Apps	Goals
Yugoslavia			League		Yugoslav Cup		League Cup		Europe		Total	
1986–87	Dinamo Zagreb	Yugoslav First League	1	0	0	0	–		–		1	0
1987–88	Dinamo Zagreb	Yugoslav First League	9	0	0	0	–		–		9	0
1988–89	Dinamo Zagreb	Yugoslav First League	23	1	3	1	–		4	0	30	2
1989–90	Dinamo Zagreb	Yugoslav First League	23	1	3	1	–		4	0	30	2
1989–90	NK Rijeka	Yugoslav First League	9	1	0	0	–		–		9	1
1990–91	NK Rijeka	Yugoslav First League	26	0	5	0	–		–		31	0
Croatia			League		Croatian Cup		Super Cup		Europe		Total	
1992	NK Rijeka	Prva HNL	18	0	3	1	–		–		21	1
1992–93	NK Rijeka	Prva HNL	28	1	4	0	–		–		32	1
1993–94	NK Rijeka	Prva HNL	25	0	8	2	–		–		33	2
Spain			League		Copa del Rey		Supercopa de España		Europe		Total	
1994–95	Hércules CF	Segunda División	27	1	1	0	–		–		28	1
1995–96	Hércules CF	Segunda División	30	1	7	0	–		–		37	1
1996–97	Hércules CF	La Liga	38	6	3	0	–		–		41	6
1997–98	UD Salamanca	La Liga	30	0	4	0	–		–		34	0
1998–99	UD Salamanca	La Liga	18	1	0	0	–		–		18	1
1999–00	UD Salamanca	Segunda División	15	0	2	0	–		–		17	0
1999–00	Racing de Ferrol	Segunda División	29	2	0	0	–		–		29	2
Country	Yugoslavia		91	3	11	2	0	0	8	0	110	5
Country	Croatia		71	11	15	3	0	0	0	0	86	4
Country	Spain		187	11	17	0	0	0	0	0	204	11
Total			349	25	43	5	0	0	8	0	400	30

=== International appearances ===
Croatia national team
Year	Apps	Goals
1992	3	0
1993	1	0
1994	3	0
1995	5	0
1996	8	0
1997	2	0
Total	22	0

== Honours ==
Hércules CF

- Segunda División: 1995–96

Yugoslavia U-20

- FIFA World Youth Championship: 1987
