= Branko Dragutinović =

Bosnian Serb footballer

Personal information
- Date of birth: 8 September 1961 (age 65)
- Place of birth: Ilijaš, SR Bosnia and Herzegovina, Yugoslavia
- Position: Defender

Youth career
- Sloga Ilijaš

Senior career*
Years	Team	Apps	(Gls)
1987–1991	Rijeka	122	(1)
1992–1993	SV Meppen	13	(1)
1994–1996	VfL Herzlake	65	(1)
- * Club domestic league appearances and goals as of 13:51, 20 December 2013 (UTC)

Branko Dragutinović (born 8 September 1961) is a Bosnian Serb former footballer who played as a defender.

== Career ==
Dragutinović spent four seasons playing for Rijeka in Yugoslav First League, where he collected 122 league appearances. In late 1991, he moved to Germany, where he first played with Meppen in 2. Bundesliga.
