= Ivan Kurtović =

Croatian footballer (born 1968)

Personal information
- Date of birth: 29 June 1968 (age 58)
- Place of birth: Pula, SFR Yugoslavia
- Height: 1.85 m (6 ft 1 in)
- Position: Centre back

Senior career*
Years	Team	Apps	(Gls)
1989–1994	Rijeka	95	(5)
1994–1998	Zagreb	59	(2)
1998–1999	Istra		
1999–2000	Jadran Poreč		
2001–2003	Uljanik	30	(3)
- * Club domestic league appearances and goals as of 13:51, 20 December 2013 (UTC)

Ivan Kurtović (born 29 June 1968) is a retired Croatian football defender. As a player, he spent five seasons with HNK Rijeka and four seasons with NK Zagreb in Croatia's Prva HNL. He retired from football in 2003 after spending several seasons playing in Croatia's lower divisions.
