= Fadil Muriqi =

Kosovar footballer (born 1959)

Personal information
- Full name: Fadil Muriqi
- Date of birth: 17 November 1959 (age 66)
- Place of birth: Peja, Yugoslavia
- Position: Midfielder

Senior career*
Years	Team	Apps	(Gls)
1978–1979	Budućnost Peć	22	(0)
1979–1989	Prishtina	246	(40)
1989–1991	Rijeka	27	(0)
1991–1992	Sydney United	22	(3)
1992–1994	Canberra FC	46	(11)
1994–1997	Dandenong Thunder	47	(10)
1997–1998	Fawkner Blues	5	(0)
1998–2000	Dandenong Thunder	34	(2)
2000–2001	Chelsea Hajduk	20	(3)

Managerial career
- 1998–1999: Dandenong Thunder
- 2001–2002: Drita
- 2005–2006: Prishtina
- * Club domestic league appearances and goals

Fadil Muriqi (Serbo-Croatian: Fadilj Murići / Фадиљ Мурићи; born 17 November 1959) is a former Yugoslav footballer of Kosovar Albanian descent who is best known for his time with Prishtina during the 1980s as part of the "Golden Generation".

== Career ==
=== Prishtina ===
Muriqi began playing football in Yugoslav Second League club Budućnost Peć but, after only one season there, he moved to Prishtina, where he played for five seasons in the Yugoslav First League from 1982 to 1988. He was nicknamed Maradona of Kosovo from the fans of Prishtina because of the similarity of the physique and playing style with the El Pibe de Oro. Together with Fadil Vokrri and Kujtim Shala he led the team of FC Prishtina in their most successful years

=== NK Rijeka ===
In the 1989–90 season together with his younger brother Xhevdet, he moved to NK Rijeka and played there another season in the Yugoslav First League before moving to Australia.

=== Australia ===
Fadil Muriqi became the second ethnic Albanian footballer, after Burim Zajmi, to play in the National Soccer League in Australia. He joined Sydney Croatia (today Sydney United) and played the 1991–92 season with them having 23 appearances and scoring 3 goals. In the following season he moved to another Croatian Australian club, Canberra FC where he played for two seasons before joining the Albanian club of South Dandenong (Dandenong Thunder) helping them to get promoted up to Victorian State League Division 1. In 1997, he played for the Fawkner Blues in the Victorian Premier League and in the following season moved back to South Dandenong for their first ever season in the Victorian Premier League.

=== Family ===
Fadil Muriqi is married to Lumnije Muriqi and has three children. The eldest being Rinor Muriqi, the second eldest, Margarita Muriqi and the youngest Gentiana Muriqi.
