= Kazimir Vulić =

Croatian footballer

Personal information
- Date of birth: 10 June 1967 (age 59)
- Place of birth: Posedarje, SFR Yugoslavia
- Height: 1.73 m (5 ft 8 in)
- Position: Midfielder

Senior career*
Years	Team	Apps	(Gls)
1985–1987	Zadar	26	(0)
1987–1993	Rijeka	98	(11)
1993–1994	Grazer AK	43	(14)
1994–1999	Hajduk Split	98	(5)
1999–2000	Rijeka	11	(0)
2000	Sichuan Quanxing	5	(0)
2001	Troglav	7	(1)
2000–2002	Brotnjo	27	(0)
2002–2003	Zadar	22	(1)
2003–2005	Solin Građa	27	(3)

International career
1992	Croatia	2	(0)

Managerial career
- 2017–2018: Jiangxi Liansheng
- * Club domestic league appearances and goals

Kazimir Vulić (Croatian pronunciation: [ʋǔːlitɕ]; born 10 June 1967 in Posedarje) is a Croatian retired football midfielder and currently coach.

== International career ==
He played two matches for Croatia, both July 1992 friendly matches away against Australia.
