= Robert Rubčić =

Croatian footballer and manager

Personal information
- Date of birth: 2 November 1963 (age 62)
- Place of birth: Rijeka, Yugoslavia
- Position: Defender

Senior career*
Years	Team	Apps	(Gls)
1982–1984	Rijeka	10	(0)
1983	→ Orijent (loan)		
1984–1985	Jedinstvo Bihać	16	(2)
1985–1994	Rijeka	168	(6)
1994–1995	HIT Gorica	16	(1)
1995–1996	Rijeka	5	(0)

International career
1990	Croatia	1	(0)

Managerial career
- 2003–2004: Orijent
- 2004–2005: Crikvenica
- 2008–2009: Rijeka
- 2010–2011: Bangladesh
- 2015–2016: Istra 1961
- 2020-present: ŽNK Rijeka
- * Club domestic league appearances and goals

Robert Rubčić (born 2 November 1963) is a Croatian retired footballer and manager.

== Playing career ==
Rubčić played for HNK Rijeka for much of his career, collecting 183 league caps between 1982 and 1996. He was the team captain for five years, and played one match for the unofficial Croatia national football team (since Croatia was still part of Yugoslavia at the time). On 22 December 1990, in a friendly match against Romania, in his hometown of Rijeka, he came on in the 86th minute as a substitute for Zlatko Kranjčar.Croatia won the match 2–0.

== Managerial career ==
During his managerial career, he led Croatian clubs NK Orijent, NK Crikvenica, and HNK Rijeka, and also acted as the assistant coach for the Croatia national football team, as well as the sport director and scout for Rijeka. In September 2010, he took over as the head coach of Bangladesh. He signed a 1-year contract, becoming the 14th foreigner to lead the national team.

As coach, he preferred fast plays with lots of running, but also emphasized technical aspects of the game. His formation of choice was 4-2-3-1. At the 2010 Asian Games, Bangladesh played in group E and suffered three losses, prompting the Bangladesh Federation to part ways with Rubčić on 14 June 2011.

In November 2015, he was announced as the new manager of Istra 1961, replacing Igor Pamić.

== Career statistics ==
=== Club statistics ===
Club performance			League		Cup		Total	
Season	Club	League	Apps	Goals	Apps	Goals	Apps	Goals
Yugoslavia			League		Yugoslav Cup		Total	
1982-83	NK Rijeka	Yugoslav First League	8	0	1	0	9	0
1983-84	NK Rijeka	Yugoslav First League	2	0	-	-	2	0
1984-85	NK Jedinstvo Bihać	Yugoslav Second League	16	2	0	0	16	2
1985-86	NK Rijeka	Yugoslav First League	4	0	2	0	6	0
1986-87	NK Rijeka	Yugoslav First League	14	0	4	0	18	0
1987-88	NK Rijeka	Yugoslav First League	31	1	1	0	32	1
1988-89	NK Rijeka	Yugoslav First League	32	3	1	0	33	3
1989-90	NK Rijeka	Yugoslav First League	16	1	3	1	19	2
1990-91	NK Rijeka	Yugoslav First League	10	1	1	0	11	1
Croatia			League		Croatian Cup		Total	
1992	NK Rijeka	Prva HNL	18	0	3	1	21	1
1992-93	NK Rijeka	Prva HNL	24	0	4	0	28	0
1993-94	NK Rijeka	Prva HNL	19	0	6	0	25	0
Slovenia	NK Rijeka	Prva HNL	League		Slovenian Cup		Total	
1994-95	ND Gorica	PrvaLiga	16	1	1	0	17	1
Croatia			League		Croatian Cup		Total	
1995-96	HNK Rijeka	Prva HNL	5	0	1	0	6	0
Country	Yugoslavia		133	8	13	1	146	9
Country	Slovenia		16	1	1	3	17	1
Country	Croatia		66	0	14	1	80	1
Total			215	9	28	5	243	11

=== International appearances ===
Croatia national team
Year	Apps	Goals
1990	1	0

== Managerial statistics ==
As of 8 December 2017

Team	Tenure*	Played	Won	Drawn	Lost	%
NK Orijent	2003 – 2004					
NK Crikvenica	2004 – 2005					
HNK Rijeka	Oct 2008 – Sep 2009	38	18	6	14	47.37
Bangladesh	Sep 2010 – Jun 2011	3	1	0	2	33.33
NK Istra 1961	Oct 2015 – Jan 2016	9	1	2	6	11.11
