= Ljubač =

Ljubač may refer to:

- Ljubač, Zadar County, a village near Ražanac, Croatia
- Ljubač, Šibenik-Knin County, a village near Knin, Croatia
- Ljubač, Dubrovnik-Neretva County, a village near Dubrovnik, Croatia
