= HNK Rijeka =

Croatian football club

Rijeka
- Full name: Hrvatski nogometni klub Rijeka (Croatian Football Club Rijeka)
- Nickname: Riječki bijeli (Rijeka's Whites)
- Short name: RIJ or RJK
- Founded: 25 November 1906; 119 years ago
- Ground: Stadion Rujevica
- Capacity: 8,191
- Owner(s): Damir Mišković, via Teanna Limited (70%); City of Rijeka (30%)
- President: Damir Mišković
- Head coach: Matjaž Kek
- League: Croatian Football League
- 2025–26: 4th of 10
- Website: nk-rijeka.hr
Home colours	Away colours

Hrvatski nogometni klub Rijeka (English: Croatian Football Club Rijeka), commonly referred to as HNK Rijeka, is a Croatian professional football club based in Rijeka. The club competes in the Croatian Football League (HNL), the top tier of the Croatian football league system. Rijeka have played their home matches at Stadion Rujevica since August 2015. Plans to replace or reconstruct the club's former home, Stadion Kantrida, remain under development; in June 2026 the City of Rijeka announced that it intended to pursue a new project with state support, but no agreement had yet been signed. The club's traditional colours are white and blue.

The club traces its origins to Club Sportivo Olimpia, a multisport organisation established in 1904 whose football activity is first documented in 1906. Olimpia and Gloria merged in 1926 to form U.S. Fiumana. In 1946, S.C.F. Quarnero/Kvarner was formally constituted as a new legal entity but inherited players and elements of Fiumana's sporting tradition. Historians have consequently differed over the degree of institutional continuity and the appropriate foundation date. The club adopted the name NK Rijeka in 1954 and HNK Rijeka in 1995. Rijeka have won two Croatian league titles, two Yugoslav Cups, seven Croatian Cups and one Croatian Football Super Cup. They won the Croatian league and cup double in 2016–17 and again in 2024–25.

== History ==
=== 1904–1926 ===
Club Sportivo Olimpia was established on 21 April 1904 as a multisport organisation during the period in which Rijeka, then commonly known as Fiume, formed a corpus separatum within Austria-Hungary. Its activities included football, tennis, swimming, cycling and athletics. The earliest presently documented activity of its football section dates from 25 November 1906, which the club recognises as the beginning of its football history.

Olimpia initially played at Scoglietto and subsequently used the ground at Kantrida. Its membership and playing staff reflected the multilingual population of the city and included people of Italian, Croatian, Hungarian and German backgrounds. A local rivalry developed with Club Sportivo Gloria, whose support was associated principally with the city's working-class districts.

The club changed the spelling of its name from Olimpia to Olympia in 1918. Olympia and Gloria continued competing in regional competitions after the First World War. In September 1926, following changes to Italian football introduced under the Fascist government, the two clubs were merged to form Unione Sportiva Fiumana.

=== 1926–1945 ===
U.S. Fiumana began competing under its new name in 1926. The club won the Italian Coppa Federale in 1927–28 and competed in the top division of Italian football in 1928–29. It spent most of the following decade in the second and third tiers and won its Serie C group in 1940–41.

Official league competition ceased following the collapse of Fascist Italy in 1943. Fiumana continued to play occasional friendly matches during the German occupation. A number of its players participated in the partisan resistance, while several were imprisoned or deported to concentration camps.

=== 1945–1954 ===
After the Second World War, Fiumana briefly resumed activity through a trade-union representative team while the international status of Rijeka remained unresolved. In 1946, the Yugoslav authorities reorganised sporting organisations according to the physical-culture society model used elsewhere in the country.

S.C.F. Quarnero, later also known by the Croatian name Kvarner, was formally registered as a new club in 1946. Historical research nevertheless identifies substantial sporting continuity with Fiumana: eight former Fiumana first-team players and one reserve-team player subsequently represented Kvarner, while the new organisation inherited the same principal stadium and much of the same support base. The initiative was led by Ettore Mazzieri and Renato Tich, both of whom had been involved in the city's earlier sporting life.

Quarnero participated in the inaugural 1946–47 Yugoslav First League. As a physical-culture society it initially incorporated several sports in addition to football. In 1948, the football section became a separate club under the bilingual name S.C. Quarnero – N.K. Kvarner.

=== 1954–1991 ===
In 1954, amid the Trieste riots and the decline of official bilingualism in Rijeka, the club adopted the monolingual name NK Rijeka. The club began regularly using a white home kit during the 1957–58 season. Rijeka returned to the Yugoslav First League in 1958 and remained in the top division until relegation in 1969.

The club's greatest successes during this period are two Yugoslav Cup titles in 1978 and 1979 and a runner-up finish in 1987, when Rijeka lost the final in the penalty shoot-out. The club never managed to finish the season higher than fourth place in the Yugoslav First League. In 1984, the club came closest to a Yugoslav championship title, finishing only two points behind Red Star Belgrade. Rijeka were also the best placed Croatian club in the Yugoslav First League in 1965, 1984 and 1987.

=== 1991–present ===
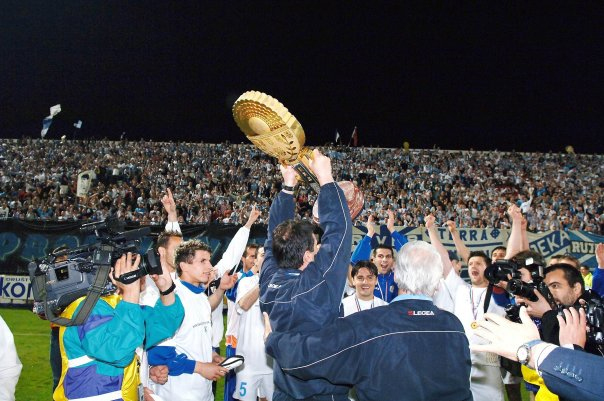
Players and staff celebrating their 2006 Croatian Cup win

Following the breakup of Yugoslavia, Rijeka became a founding member of the Croatian top division in 1992. In 1995, the club adopted its present name, Hrvatski nogometni klub Rijeka. Rijeka won their first Croatian league title in 2016–17, ending Dinamo Zagreb's sequence of eleven consecutive championships. They won a second league title in 2024–25. In both championship seasons, Rijeka also won the Croatian Football Cup, completing domestic doubles. The 2024–25 cup victory was the club's seventh since Croatian independence.

Rijeka narrowly missed the championship in 1998–99. In the final round, with Rijeka and Osijek level at 1–1, an 89th-minute goal by Admir Hasančić was disallowed for offside. Rijeka consequently finished one point behind Croatia Zagreb. A later three-dimensional reconstruction commissioned by 24sata concluded that Hasančić had not been in an offside position. Nacional subsequently reported that state intelligence services had monitored football officials and journalists during the season; those allegations have remained part of the controversy surrounding the championship.

=== HNK Rijeka in the European competitions ===
By the 2026–27 season, Rijeka had entered UEFA club competitions in 26 seasons, including 14 consecutive seasons from 2013–14 onward. The club's furthest progress in a UEFA competition was the quarter-final of the 1979–80 European Cup Winners' Cup, in which it lost 2–0 on aggregate to Juventus. Rijeka also defeated eventual competition winners Real Madrid 3–1 at home in the 1984–85 UEFA Cup. In the return match in Madrid, Rijeka lost 3–0 after three of their players were sent off. One of those players, Damir Desnica, who had been deaf since birth, received a second yellow card for allegedly insulting the referee.

In 2013, after winning 4–3 on aggregate against VfB Stuttgart, Rijeka qualified for the 2013–14 UEFA Europa League group stage. Rijeka also participated in the 2014–15 UEFA Europa League group stage, where they defeated Feyenoord and Standard Liège and drew with title-holders and eventual winners Sevilla. In 2017, Rijeka reached the 2017–18 UEFA Champions League play-off, where they lost 3–1 on aggregate to Greek champions Olympiacos, and automatically qualified for the 2017–18 UEFA Europa League group stage. In the group stage, they recorded a famous home win (2–0) against AC Milan. In 2020–21 Rijeka reached the group stages of the Europa League for the fourth time in eight years but once again failed to progress to the knockout stages. In 2021–22, 2023–24 and 2024–25, Rijeka was eliminated in the play-off round of the Conference League. In the 2025–26 UEFA Conference League, Rijeka defeated Omonia 4–1 on aggregate in the knockout phase play-offs to reach the round of 16, where they were eliminated 3–2 on aggregate by Strasbourg after a 1–2 home defeat and a 1–1 away draw.

=== Private ownership ===
In February 2012, Gabriele Volpi – an Italian businessman and the founder of Orlean Invest, as well as the owner of football club Spezia and water polo club Pro Recco – injected much-needed capital into the club. With the privatization process complete by September 2013, Volpi, through Dutch-based Stichting Social Sport Foundation, owned 70% of the club, with the City of Rijeka in control of the remaining 30%. On 29 December 2017, it was announced that chairman Damir Mišković, through London-based Teanna Limited, acquired the majority stake in the club from Stichting Social Sport Foundation.

=== Record transfers ===
In January 2015, Rijeka sold their star striker Andrej Kramarić to Leicester City for a club-record transfer fee of £9.7 million.

== Origins and historical names ==
- 1904 – C.S. Olimpia (Club Sportivo Olimpia), established as a multisport organisation
- 1906 – first documented activity of Olimpia's football section
- 1918 – C.S. Olympia (Club Sportivo Olympia)
- 1926 – U.S. Fiumana (Unione Sportiva Fiumana), formed through the merger of Olympia and C.S. Gloria
- 1945 – R.S. Fiumana (Rappresentativa Sindacale Fiumana)
- 1946 – S.C.F. Quarnero / F.D. Kvarner, formally registered as a new physical-culture society that inherited elements of Fiumana's sporting tradition
- 1948 – S.C. Quarnero – N.K. Kvarner (Società Calcio Quarnero – Nogometni klub Kvarner)
- 1954 – N.K. Rijeka (Nogometni klub Rijeka)
- 1995 – H.N.K. Rijeka (Hrvatski nogometni klub Rijeka)

== Stadium ==
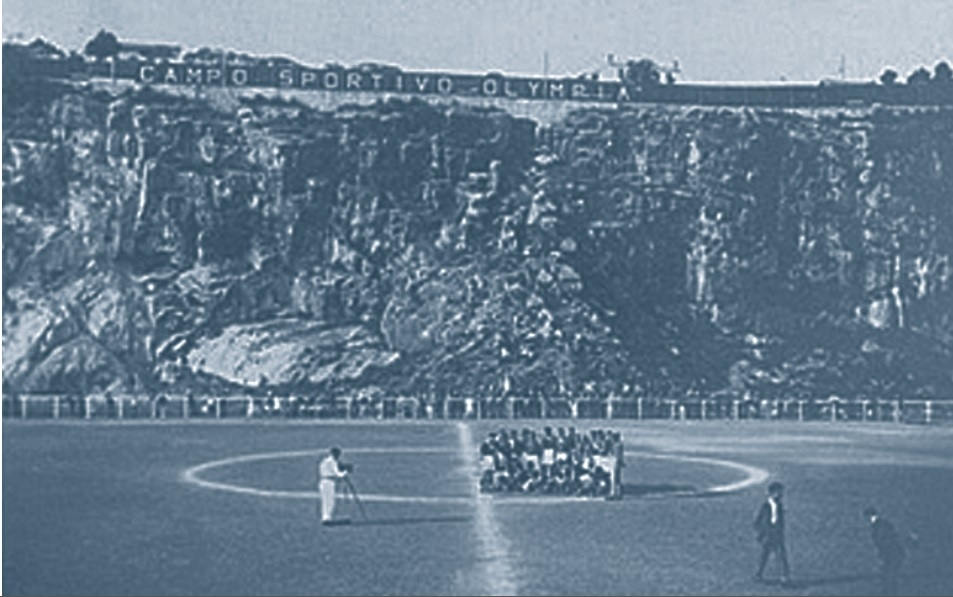
The Kantrida stadium in season 1921–22. At the time, the field was named Campo Sportivo Olimpia, as per the club's original name.

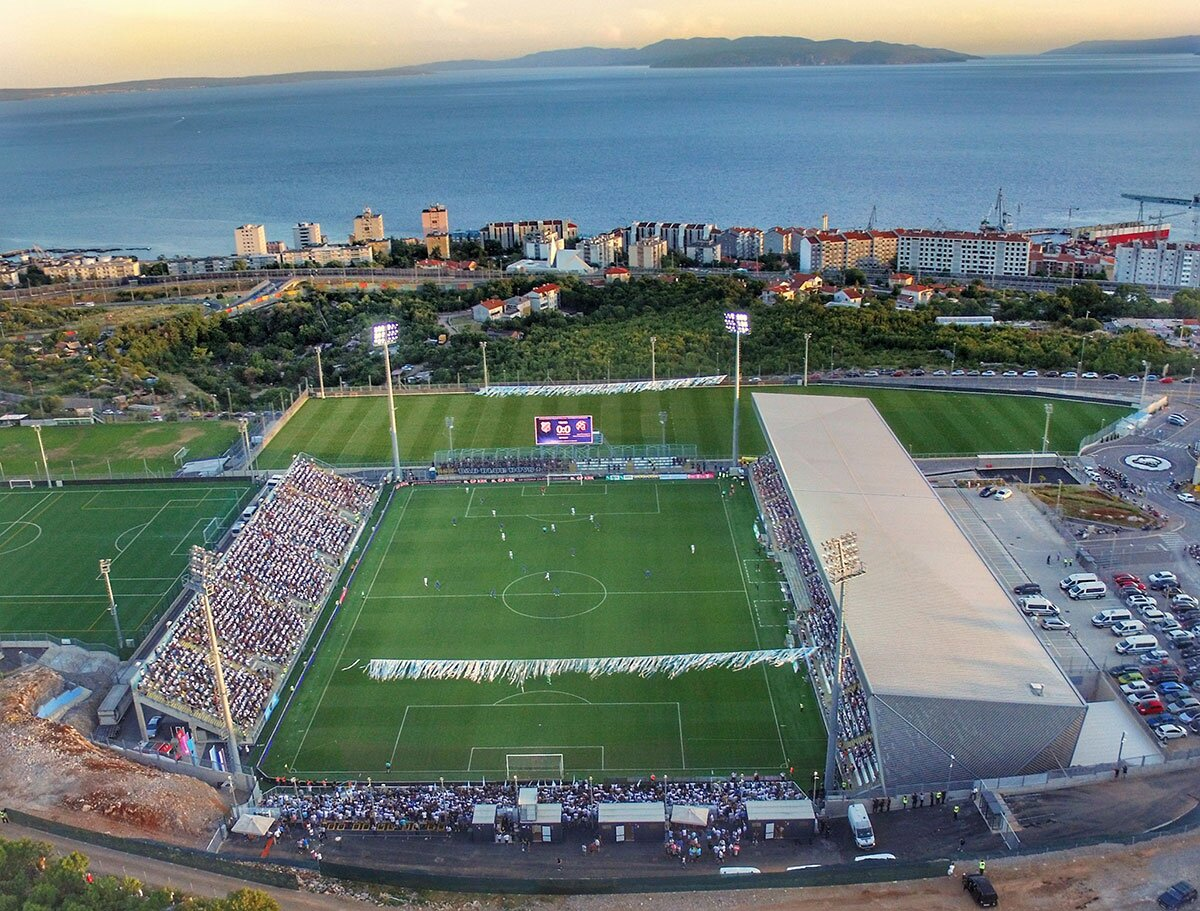
Rujevica stadium, NK Rijeka's current home.

The club's early teams played at Scoglietto before moving to Stadion Kantrida, which became Rijeka's principal home ground. Apart from a period of renovation between 1947 and 1951, Rijeka remained at Kantrida until July 2015. Since August 2015, the club has played at Stadion Rujevica, an all-seater stadium within its training complex. The stadium has 8,191 seats.

Several proposals have been advanced for a new or reconstructed stadium at Kantrida. A privately financed proposal unveiled in 2023 included a stadium, residential towers, a hotel and other commercial development. In June 2026, the City of Rijeka announced that it was moving away from that proposal and instead intended to seek a new design and pursue joint public financing with the Croatian government. At the time of the announcement, negotiations were continuing and no financing agreement had been signed.

== Support ==
Rijeka's ultras group is called Armada Rijeka, or simply Armada. The group has been active since 1987, but some forms of organised (albeit not registered as associations) support were present and following the club already in the decades before, with the earliest reported in the 1920s.

The Supporters of HNK Rijeka are mainly from Primorje-Gorski Kotar and Istra

The club reported a record 18,439 members during the 2025–26 season, an increase of approximately 2,500 from the previous season.

== Rivalries ==
Rijeka's greatest rivalry nowadays is with Hajduk Split. Since 1946, the Adriatic derby has been contested between the two most popular Croatian football clubs from the Adriatic coast. Other rivalries exist with major clubs in Croatia like Dinamo Zagreb and a milder with Osijek. The primary regional derby (Derby della Učka) is with Istra Pula. The origins of the Rijeka–Pula rivalry date back to the clashes between Fiumana and Grion Pola since the late 1920s. The city derby with Orijent is probably the oldest, with its roots in the clashes between CS Olimpia and CS Gloria against Orijent and the other more successful in those early years Sušak-based club, Victoria.

== Kit manufacturers and shirt sponsors ==
Period	Kit manufacturer	Shirt partner
1998–1999	Adidas	INA
1999–2002	Kronos	INA
2002–2003	Torpedo	INA
2003–2004	Torpedo	Lero
2004–2005	Legea	Lero
2005–2006	Legea	INA
2006–2008	Kappa	Croatia Osiguranje
2008–2012	Jako	Croatia Osiguranje
2012–2014	Lotto	–
2014–2016	Jako	–
2017–2018	Jako	Sava Osiguranje
2018–2023	Joma	Sava Osiguranje
2023–2026	Joma	Favbet
2026–	Joma	–

== Players ==
=== Current squad ===
As of 17 September 2026

Note: Flags indicate national team as defined under FIFA eligibility rules; some limited exceptions apply. Players may hold more than one non-FIFA nationality.

No.	Pos.	Nation	Player
3	DF	CRO	Moreno Živković
4	MF	CRO	Niko Janković
5	MF	PER	Alfonso Barco
6	MF	CRO	Branko Pavić
7	FW	GER	Yusuf Kabadayı (on loan from Augsburg)
8	MF	CRO	Ivan Ćubelić
9	FW	IRI	Mohammad Mohebi
10	MF	CRO	Toni Fruk (vice-captain)
13	GK	SLO	Igor Vekić
14	MF	BIH	Amer Gojak
15	FW	CRO	Goran Grulović
16	DF	CRO	Viktor Vešligaj
18	FW	GHA	Daniel Adu-Adjei

No.	Pos.	Nation	Player
19	MF	ITA	Samuele Vignato
21	FW	CRO	Jakov Puljić
22	DF	CRO	Ante Oreč
23	MF	LTU	Justas Lasickas
26	MF	POR	Tiago Dantas
28	DF	CRO	Teo Barišić
34	DF	SRB	Mladen Devetak
42	FW	SUI	Calixte Ligue (on loan from Venezia)
45	DF	CRO	Ante Majstorović (captain)
51	DF	SUI	Anel Husić
77	FW	CRO	Ante Matej Jurić
91	DF	CRO	Noel Bodetić
99	GK	SRB	Aleksa Todorović

=== Players with multiple nationalities ===
- (Serbia) (Croatia) Mladen Devetak
- (Switzerland) (Bosnia and Herzegovina) Anel Husić
- (Ghana) (England) Daniel Adu-Adjei
- (Italy) (Brazil) Samuele Vignato
- (Albania) (Switzerland) (France) Florent Shehu
- (Croatia) (France) Teo Barišić
- (Germany) (Turkey) Yusuf Kabadayı
- (Switzerland) (Ivory Coast) Calixte Ligue

=== Dual registration ===
Note: Flags indicate national team as defined under FIFA eligibility rules; some limited exceptions apply. Players may hold more than one non-FIFA nationality.

No.	Pos.	Nation	Player
1	GK	CRO	Vito Kovač (at (Croatia) Opatija)
12	GK	CRO	Domagoj Ivan Marić (at (Croatia) Orijent)
30	MF	NGR	Simon Karshe Cletus (at (Croatia) Grobničan)

No.	Pos.	Nation	Player
31	GK	NGR	David Nwolokor (at (Croatia) Opatija)
—	DF	CRO	Roko Valinčić (at (Croatia) Orijent)
—	MF	GAM	Alasana Samateh (at (Croatia) Grobničan)

=== Youth academy ===
The following players have previously made appearances or have appeared on the substitutes bench for the first team.

Note: Flags indicate national team as defined under FIFA eligibility rules; some limited exceptions apply. Players may hold more than one non-FIFA nationality.

No.	Pos.	Nation	Player
17	DF	CRO	Petar Klobučar
24	DF	CRO	Vito Adamović

No.	Pos.	Nation	Player
72	MF	CRO	Fran Škalamera

=== Other players under contract ===
Note: Flags indicate national team as defined under FIFA eligibility rules; some limited exceptions apply. Players may hold more than one non-FIFA nationality.

No.	Pos.	Nation	Player
—	MF	ALB	Florent Shehu

=== Out on loan ===
Note: Flags indicate national team as defined under FIFA eligibility rules; some limited exceptions apply. Players may hold more than one non-FIFA nationality.

No.	Pos.	Nation	Player
2	DF	CRO	Lovro Kitin (at (Slovenia) Mura until 30 June 2027)
25	FW	CRO	Dominik Thaqi (at (Croatia) Lokomotiva Zagreb until 30 June 2027)
27	FW	CRO	Šimun Butić (at (Slovenia) Mura until 30 June 2027)
37	FW	GAM	Cherno Saho (at (Croatia) Rudeš until 30 June 2027)
—	GK	CRO	Maroje Kostopeč (at (Croatia) Karlovac 1919 until 30 June 2027)

No.	Pos.	Nation	Player
—	MF	CRO	Rajan Žlibanović (at (Austria) Kapfenberger SV until 30 June 2027)
—	FW	SRB	Komnen Andrić (at (Georgia (country)) Torpedo Kutaisi until 31 December 2026)
—	FW	CRO	Dominik Dogan (at (Croatia) Karlovac 1919 until 30 June 2027)
—	FW	CRO	Marko Aščić (at (Slovenia) Mura until 30 June 2027)

== Club officials and technical staff ==
Position	Staff
President	(Croatia) Damir Mišković
Supervisory board president	(Italy) Francesco Cuzzocrea
Supervisory board member	(Croatia) Srećko Juričić
Supervisory board member	(Croatia) Veljko Karabaić
Supervisory board member	(Nigeria) Ndiomu Didi Dinepre Peter
Procurator	(Croatia) Vlatko Vrkić
Board member	(Croatia) Nikola Ivaniš
Director of finance	(Croatia) Marina Cesarac Dorčić
Administrative director	(Croatia) Marina Vela
Director of football	(Croatia) Srećko Juričić
Sporting director	(Croatia) Darko Raić-Sudar
Sporting director (assistant)	(Croatia) Antonini Čulina
Academy director	(Croatia) Tomislav Ivković
Club secretary	(Croatia) Milica Alavanja
Press secretary	(Croatia) Sandra Nešić
Head coach	(Slovenia) Matjaž Kek
Assistant coach	(Croatia) Duje Čop (Croatia) Mate Maleš
Goalkeeping coach	(Croatia) Ivan Vargić
Fitness coach	(Croatia) Luka Brkljača (Croatia) Dominik Rilov
Team manager	(Croatia) David Kalebić
Doctor	(Croatia) Nina Lovrić
Physiotherapists	(Croatia) Enio Krajač (Croatia) Petar Perišić (Croatia) Denis Miškulin
Analyst	(Croatia) Antonio Sebežević
Kit managers	(Croatia) Denis Miškulin (Croatia) Arsen Smolić

Last updated: 30 June 2026
Source: Teams

== Notable players ==
To appear in this section a player must have satisfied all of the following three criteria:

- (1) player has at least 100 appearances in official matches, including first division (Yugoslav First League and Croatian First Football League), domestic cup (Yugoslav Cup, Croatian Cup and Croatian Supercup) and UEFA club competitions;
- (2) player has scored at least 20 goals in official matches if forward, 5 if midfielder and no goal requirement if defender or goalkeeper in first division (Yugoslav First League and Croatian First Football League), domestic cup (Yugoslav Cup, Croatian Cup and Croatian Supercup) and UEFA club competitions; and
- (3) player has played at least one international match for their national team while under contract with Rijeka.
- Otherwise, also included are 30 of the club's top scorers and most capped players in the first division.
- (Italy) Ezio Loik
- (Italy) Rodolfo Volk
- (Italy) Mario Varglien
- (Italy) Giovanni Varglien
- (Italy) Luigi Ossoinach
- (Italy) Andrea Kregar
- (Italy) Giovanni Maras
- (Hungary) Ernő Egri Erbstein
- (Hungary) Ferenc Molnár
- (Hungary) Balassa Béla
- (Austria) Alexander Gorgon
- (Bosnia and Herzegovina) Senad Brkić
- (Bosnia and Herzegovina) Admir Hasančić
- (Bosnia and Herzegovina) Zoran Kvržić
- (Bosnia and Herzegovina) Stjepan Radeljić
- (Bosnia and Herzegovina) Martin Zlomislić
- (Brazil) Héber Araujo dos Santos
- (Croatia) Filip Bradarić
- (Croatia) Elvis Brajković
- (Croatia) Antonio Čolak
- (Croatia) Toni Fruk
- (Croatia) Dario Knežević
- (Croatia) Andrej Kramarić
- (Croatia) Nediljko Labrović
- (Croatia) Mate Maleš
- (Croatia) Matej Mitrović
- (Croatia) Mladen Mladenović
- (Croatia) Roberto Paliska
- (Croatia) Dubravko Pavličić
- (Croatia) Mladen Romić
- (Croatia) Daniel Šarić
- (North Macedonia) Leonard Zuta
- (Montenegro) Radomir Đalović
- (Montenegro) Marko Vešović
- (Slovenia) Roman Bezjak
- (Switzerland) Josip Drmić
- (Switzerland) Mario Gavranović
- (Socialist Federal Republic of Yugoslavia) Radojko Avramović
- (Socialist Federal Republic of Yugoslavia) Marijan Brnčić
- (Socialist Federal Republic of Yugoslavia) Boško Bursać
- (Socialist Federal Republic of Yugoslavia) Nikica Cukrov
- (Socialist Federal Republic of Yugoslavia) Damir Desnica
- (Socialist Federal Republic of Yugoslavia) Adriano Fegic
- (Socialist Federal Republic of Yugoslavia) Nenad Gračan
- (Socialist Federal Republic of Yugoslavia) Tonči Gulin
- (Socialist Federal Republic of Yugoslavia) Miloš Hrstić
- (Socialist Federal Republic of Yugoslavia) Janko Janković
- (Socialist Federal Republic of Yugoslavia) Marijan Jantoljak
- (Socialist Federal Republic of Yugoslavia) Srećko Juričić
- (Socialist Federal Republic of Yugoslavia) Miodrag Kustudić
- (Socialist Federal Republic of Yugoslavia) Vladimir Lukarić
- (Socialist Federal Republic of Yugoslavia) Sergio Machin
- (Socialist Federal Republic of Yugoslavia) Danko Matrljan
- (Socialist Federal Republic of Yugoslavia) Nikica Milenković
- (Socialist Federal Republic of Yugoslavia) Anđelo Milevoj
- (Socialist Federal Republic of Yugoslavia) Velimir Naumović
- (Socialist Federal Republic of Yugoslavia) Petar Radaković
- (Socialist Federal Republic of Yugoslavia) Zvjezdan Radin
- (Socialist Federal Republic of Yugoslavia) Milan Radović
- (Socialist Federal Republic of Yugoslavia) Mauro Ravnić
- (Socialist Federal Republic of Yugoslavia) Milan Ružić
- (Socialist Federal Republic of Yugoslavia) Miroslav Šugar
- (Socialist Federal Republic of Yugoslavia) Edmond Tomić
- (Socialist Federal Republic of Yugoslavia) Bruno Veselica
- (Socialist Federal Republic of Yugoslavia) Mladen Vranković
- (Socialist Federal Republic of Yugoslavia) Nedeljko Vukoje

Source: Appearances and Goals. Last updated 26 April 2026.

=== All-time Best 11 ===
According to a 2005–07 survey of former players (older than 40 years of age) and respected journalists, Marinko Lazzarich found that the best all-time team of Rijeka is as follows:

1. Jantoljak, 2. Milevoj, 3. Hrstić, 4. Radaković, 5. Radin, 6. Juričić, 7. Lukarić, 8. Gračan, 9. Osojnak, 10. Naumović, 11. Desnica.

Rijeka's daily, Novi list, in 2011 declared the following 11 players as Rijeka's best all time team:

1. Jantoljak, 2. Šarić, 3. Radin, 4. Juričić, 5. Hrstić, 6. Loik, 7. Radaković, 8. Mladenović, 9. Naumović, 10. Skoblar, 11. Desnica.

=== Best 11 (2010–20) ===
In 2020, the club's fans voted to select the best squad over the past decade to fit in a 4–2–3–1 formation:

Prskalo – Ristovski, Župarić, Mitrović, Zuta – Kreilach, Moisés – Vešović, Andrijašević, Sharbini – Kramarić. Manager: Kek.

== Historical list of coaches ==
- (Hungary) Karoly Bela (September 1926 – July 1927)
- (Italy) Delfino Costanzo Valle (August 1927 – July 1929)
- (Hungary) Imre Emmerich Poszonyi (August 1929 – July 1932)
- (Italy) Luigi Ossoinak (August 1932 – July 1933)
- (Italy) Andrea Kregar (August 1933 – July 1936)
- (Hungary) Eugen Payer (August 1936 – July 1938)
- (Italy) Marcello Mihalich (August 1938 – July 1940)
- (Italy) Angelo Piccalunga (August 1940 – July 1942)
- (Austria) Artur Kolisch (August 1942 – 1944)
- (Austria) Hans Bloch (July 1946 – August 1946)
- (Socialist Federal Republic of Yugoslavia) Jozo Matošić (August 1946 – August 1947)
- (Socialist Federal Republic of Yugoslavia) Ivan Smojver & (Socialist Federal Republic of Yugoslavia) Ante Vukelić (September 1947 – October 1947)
- (Socialist Federal Republic of Yugoslavia) Franjo Glaser (October 1947 – July 1948)
- (Socialist Federal Republic of Yugoslavia) Zvonko Jazbec (September 1948 – December 1948)
- (Socialist Federal Republic of Yugoslavia) Franjo Glaser (January 1949 – December 1950)
- (Socialist Federal Republic of Yugoslavia) Slavko Kodrnja (January 1951 – December 1951)
- (Socialist Federal Republic of Yugoslavia) Ljubo Benčić (January 1952 – August 1952)
- (Socialist Federal Republic of Yugoslavia) Nikola Duković (September 1952 – April 1953)
- (Socialist Federal Republic of Yugoslavia) Antun Lokošek (May 1953 – December 1953)
- (Socialist Federal Republic of Yugoslavia) Ratomir Čabrić (January 1954 – July 1954)
- (Socialist Federal Republic of Yugoslavia) Franjo Glaser (August 1954 – July 1956)
- (Socialist Federal Republic of Yugoslavia) Nikola Duković (September 1956 – July 1957)
- (Socialist Federal Republic of Yugoslavia) Milorad Ognjanov (September 1957 – October 1959)
- (Socialist Federal Republic of Yugoslavia) Luka Kaliterna (November 1959 – May 1960)
- (Socialist Federal Republic of Yugoslavia) Stojan Osojnak (May 1960 – June 1961)
- (Socialist Federal Republic of Yugoslavia) Ostoja Simić (June 1961 – May 1962)
- (Socialist Federal Republic of Yugoslavia) Angelo Ziković (August 1962 – December 1962)
- (Romania) Virgil Popescu (January 1963 – September 1964)
- (Socialist Federal Republic of Yugoslavia) Stojan Osojnak (October 1964 – June 1967)
- (Socialist Federal Republic of Yugoslavia) Vladimir Beara (May 1967 – November 1968)
- (Socialist Federal Republic of Yugoslavia) Angelo Ziković (November 1968 – June 1970)
- (Socialist Federal Republic of Yugoslavia) Ilijas Pašić (June 1970 – June 1971)
- (Socialist Federal Republic of Yugoslavia) Stevan Vilotić (June 1971 – June 1972)
- (Socialist Federal Republic of Yugoslavia) Marcel Žigante (June 1972 – May 1973)
- (Socialist Federal Republic of Yugoslavia) Ivica Šangulin (May 1973 – June 1974)
- (Socialist Federal Republic of Yugoslavia) Gojko Zec (June 1974 – June 1976)
- (Socialist Federal Republic of Yugoslavia) Dragutin Spasojević (June 1976 – April 1979)
- (Socialist Federal Republic of Yugoslavia) Marijan Brnčić (interim) (April 1979 – June 1979)
- (Socialist Federal Republic of Yugoslavia) Miroslav Blažević (June 1979 – January 1981)
- (Socialist Federal Republic of Yugoslavia) Marijan Brnčić (January 1981 – April 1983)
- (Socialist Federal Republic of Yugoslavia) Josip Skoblar (May 1983 – December 1986)
- (Socialist Federal Republic of Yugoslavia) Mladen Vranković (January 1987 – June 1989)
- (Socialist Federal Republic of Yugoslavia) Vladimir Lukarić (June 1989 – January 1991)
- (Socialist Federal Republic of Yugoslavia) Nikola "Pape" Filipović (January 1991)
- (Socialist Federal Republic of Yugoslavia) Mladen Vranković (February 1991)
- (Socialist Federal Republic of Yugoslavia) Željko Mudrovičić (March 1991 – June 1991)
- (Croatia) Marijan Jantoljak (June 1991 – November 1992)
- (Croatia) Srećko Juričić & Mile Tomljenović (November 1992)
- (Croatia) Srećko Juričić (January 1993 – June 1994)
- (Croatia) Zvjezdan Radin (June 1994 – March 1995)
- (Croatia) Mladen Vranković (April 1995)
- (Croatia) Josip Skoblar (April 1995 – June 1995)
- (Croatia) Marijan Jantoljak (June 1995 – September 1995)
- (Croatia) Ranko Buketa (interim) (September 1995 – October 1995)
- (Croatia) Josip Skoblar (October 1995 – November 1995)
- (Croatia) Miroslav Blažević & (Croatia) Nenad Gračan (January 1996 – June 1996)
- (Croatia) Luka Bonačić (June 1996 – August 1996)
- (Croatia) Ivan Kocjančić (interim) (August 1996)
- (Croatia) Branko Ivanković (August 1996 – March 1998)
- (Croatia) Nenad Gračan (March 1998 – November 2000)
- (Croatia) Boris Tičić (interim) (November 2000 – December 2000)
- (Croatia) Predrag Stilinović (December 2000 – May 2001)
- (Croatia) Ivan Katalinić (May 2001 – May 2002)
- (Croatia) Zlatko Kranjčar (May 2002 – November 2002)
- (Croatia) Mladen Mladenović (November 2002 – March 2003)
- (Croatia) Vjekoslav Lokica (March 2003 – July 2003)
- (Croatia) Ivan Katalinić (July 2003 – May 2004)
- (Croatia) Elvis Scoria (1 July 2004 – 30 September 2005)
- (Croatia) Dragan Skočić (1 October 2005 – 30 September 2006)
- (Croatia) Milivoj Bračun (1 October 2006 – 13 March 2007)
- (Croatia) Josip Kuže (12 March 2007 – 4 June 2007)
- (Croatia) Zlatko Dalić (1 June 2007 – 30 June 2008)
- (Croatia) Mladen Ivančić (7 July 2008 – 8 October 2008)
- (Croatia) Stjepan Ostojić (interim) (4 October 2008 – 13 October 2008)
- (Croatia) Robert Rubčić (13 October 2008 – 21 September 2009)
- (Croatia) Zoran Vulić (22 September 2009 – 10 November 2009)
- (Croatia) Nenad Gračan (10 November 2009 – 6 November 2010)
- (Croatia) Elvis Scoria (7 November 2010 – 16 June 2011)
- (Croatia) Alen Horvat (20 June 2011 – 4 October 2011)
- (Bosnia and Herzegovina) Ivo Ištuk (4 October 2011 – 18 March 2012)
- (Croatia) Dragan Skočić (19 March 2012 – 30 April 2012)
- (Croatia) Mladen Ivančić (interim) (30 April 2012 – 2 May 2012)
- (Croatia) Elvis Scoria (2 May 2012 – 24 February 2013)
- (Slovenia) Matjaž Kek (27 February 2013 – 6 October 2018)
- (Croatia) Igor Bišćan (9 October 2018 – 22 September 2019)
- (Slovenia) Simon Rožman (23 September 2019 – 27 February 2021)
- (Croatia) Goran Tomić (1 March 2021 – 27 May 2022)
- (Croatia) Dragan Tadić (20 June 2022 – 16 August 2022)
- (Croatia) Fausto Budicin (interim) (16 August 2022 – 5 September 2022)
- (Italy) Serse Cosmi (5 September 2022 – 13 November 2022)
- (Bosnia and Herzegovina) Sergej Jakirović (30 November 2022 – 21 August 2023)
- (Croatia) Darko Raić-Sudar (interim) (22 August 2023 – 25 August 2023)
- (Croatia) Željko Sopić (25 August 2023 – 13 August 2024)
- (Montenegro) Radomir Đalović (13 August 2024 – 1 September 2025)
- (Spain) Víctor Sánchez (3 September 2025 – 27 May 2026)
- (Slovenia) Matjaž Kek (7 June 2026 – present)

=== Winning managers ===
Name	Nationality	Honours	Total
Matjaž Kek	Slovenia	2013–14 Croatian Cup, 2014 Croatian Super Cup, 2016–17 Croatian First League, 2016–17 Croatian Cup	4
Dragutin Spasojević	Yugoslavia	1977–78 Yugoslav Cup, 1977–78 Balkans Cup	2
Radomir Đalović	Montenegro	2024–25 Croatian League, 2024–25 Croatian Cup	2
Delfino Costanzo Valle	Italy	1927–28 Italian Federal Cup	1
Marijan Brnčić	Yugoslavia	1978–79 Yugoslav Cup	1
Elvis Scoria	Croatia	2004–05 Croatian Cup	1
Dragan Skočić	Croatia	2005–06 Croatian Cup	1
Igor Bišćan	Croatia	2018–19 Croatian Cup	1
Simon Rožman	Slovenia	2019–20 Croatian Cup	1

== Presidents ==
- Antonio Carlo de Schlemmer 1918–1920
- Antonio Marcich 1920–1921
- Pietro Pasquali 1921–1923
- Clemente Marassi 1923–1925
- Nino Host-Venturi 1925–1926
- Giovanni Stiglich 1926–1928
- Ramiro Antonini 1928–1929
- Oscar Sperber 1929–1931
- Costanzo Delfino 1931–1936
- Alessandro Szemere 1936–1937
- Eugenio Zoncada 1937–1938
- Alessandro Andreanelli 1938–1939
- Giuseppe Ianetti 1939–1940
- Alesandro Andreanelli 1940–1941
- Carlo Descovich 1941–1942
- Andrea Gastaldi 1942–1945
- Luigi Sošić, 1946
- Giovanni Cucera, 1946–1948
- Ambrosio Stečić, 1948–1952
- Dr. Zdravko Kučić, 1953–1954
- Milorad Doričić, 1955–1956
- Milan Blažević, 1957–1959
- Stjepan Koren, 1960–1963
- Milorad Doričić, 1964–1969
- Vilim Mulc, 1969–1971
- Davor Sušanj, 1971
- Ljubo Španjol, 1972–1978
- Zvonko Poščić, 1978–1979
- Nikola Jurčević, 1980
- Marijan Glavan, 1981
- Davor Sušanj, 1981–1984
- Stjepko Gugić, 1985–1986
- Dragan Krčelić, 1986–1989
- Želimir Gruičić, 1989–1991
- Darko Čargonja, 1991–1992
- Josip Lokmer, 1993–1994
- Krsto Pavić, 1994–1995
- Hrvoje Šarinić, 1995–1996
- Franjo Šoda, 1996–1997
- Prof. Žarko Tomljanović, 1997–2000
- Hrvoje Šarinić, Dr. Ivan Vanja Frančišković, Robert Ježić, 2000
- Robert Ježić, 2000
- Sanjin Kirigin, 2000–2002
- Duško Grabovac, 2002–2003
- Robert Ježić, 2003–2008
- Dr. Ivan Vanja Frančišković, 2008–2009
- Ivan Turčić, 2009–2011
- Robert Komen, 2011–2012
- Damir Mišković, 2012–

== Honours ==
Rijeka has won two Croatian First Football League titles, two Yugoslav Cups and seven Croatian Cups, one Italian Coppa Federale. In European competitions, the club has reached the quarter-final of the Cup Winners' Cup in 1979–80, UEFA Conference League Round of 16 in 2025–26, UEFA Cup Round of 32 in 1984–85, and group stages of the UEFA Europa League in 2013–14, 2014–15, 2017–18 and 2020–21. The club has also won the 1977–78 Balkans Cup.

Type	Competition	Titles	Seasons
Domestic	Croatian First League	2	2016–17, 2024–25
Domestic	Yugoslav Cup	2	1977–78, 1978–79
Domestic	Croatian Cup	7	2004–05, 2005–06, 2013–14, 2016–17, 2018–19, 2019–20, 2024–25
Domestic	Croatian Super Cup	1	2014

=== Other titles ===
Yugoslavia

- Yugoslav Second League
  - Winners (6): 1952, 1957–58, 1969–70, 1970–71, 1971–72, 1973–74

Italy

- Italian Coppa Federale
  - Winners (1): 1927–28
- Italian North-East league
  - Winners (1): 1923–24
  - Runners-up: 1924–25
- Italian Third League
  - Winners (1): 1940–41
- Julian March Championship
  - Winners (2): 1921–22, 1922–23

Friuli and Julian March Cup

- Winners (1): 1922–23

Free State of Fiume

- Fiuman championship
  - Winners (1): 1920–21
- Fiuman-Julian Cup
  - Winners (1): 1921

Other competitions

- Grazioli Cup
  - Runners-up: 1919
- Balkans Cup
  - Winners (1): 1977–78
  - Runners-up: 1979–80
- The Atlantic Cup
  - Winners (1): 2017

=== Runners-up ===
- Croatian First League
  - Runners-up (8): 1998–99, 2005–06, 2013–14, 2014–15, 2015–16, 2017–18, 2018–19, 2023–24
- Yugoslav Cup
  - Runners-up (1): 1986–87
- Croatian Cup
  - Runners-up (4): 1993–94, 2021–22, 2023–24, 2025–26
- Croatian Super Cup
  - Runners-up (3): 2005, 2006, 2019

Source:, Last updated 13 May 2026.

== European record ==
=== UEFA club competition record ===
Competition	Pld	W	D	L	GF	GA	Last season played
UEFA Champions League	10	2	3	5	11	14	2025–26
UEFA Cup / UEFA Europa League	76	29	19	28	105	97	2025–26
UEFA Conference League	32	14	9	9	41	33	2026–27
UEFA Cup Winners' Cup	10	3	3	4	8	9	1979–80
UEFA Intertoto Cup	4	1	1	2	3	5	2008
Total	132	49	35	48	168	158	

Source: uefa.com, Fully up to date on 27 August 2026.
Pld = Matches played; W = Matches won; D = Matches drawn; L = Matches lost; GF = Goals for; GA = Goals against. Defunct competitions indicated in italics.

==== By ground ====
Ground	Pld	W	D	L	GF	GA	GD
Home	66	34	16	16	102	61	+41
Away	66	15	19	32	66	97	−31
Total	132	49	35	48	168	158	+10

Source: uefa.com, Fully up to date on 27 August 2026.
Pld = Matches played; W = Matches won; D = Matches drawn; L = Matches lost; GF = Goals for; GA = Goals against.

=== Matches ===
Non-UEFA competitions are listed in italics.

Season	Competition	Round	Opponent	Home	Away	Aggregate
1962–63	Intertoto Cup	Group; B3	(West Germany) Rot-Weiß Oberhausen	2–1	3–4	1st out of 4
1962–63	Intertoto Cup	Group; B3	(Switzerland) Basel	5–1	2–2	1st out of 4
1962–63	Intertoto Cup	Group; B3	(Netherlands) PSV	3–1	3–2	1st out of 4
1962–63	Intertoto Cup	QF	(Hungary) Dozsa Pecs	2–2	1–2	3–4
1965–66	Intertoto Cup	Group; B1	(East Germany) Motor Jena	0–3	1–3	4th out of 4
1965–66	Intertoto Cup	Group; B1	(Czechoslovakia) Tatran Prešov	0–0	1–3	4th out of 4
1965–66	Intertoto Cup	Group; B1	(Polish People's Republic) Szombierki Bytom	0–3	1–0	4th out of 4
1974–75	Mitropa Cup	Group; A	(Hungary) Tatabánya	3–1	1–3	2nd out of 3
1974–75	Mitropa Cup	Group; A	(Austria) Wacker Innsbruck	1–3	0–0	2nd out of 3
1977	Intertoto Cup	Group; 6	(Denmark) Frem Kobenhavn	2–2	0–2	3rd out of 4
1977	Intertoto Cup	Group; 6	(Polish People's Republic) Ruch Chorzów	0–1	4–2	3rd out of 4
1977	Intertoto Cup	Group; 6	(Austria) Grazer AK	1–1	3–0	3rd out of 4
1978	Balkans Cup	Group; B	(Albania) Skënderbeu	6–0	0–1	1st out of 3
1978	Balkans Cup	Group; B	(Greece) Aris Thessaloniki	2–0	2–1	1st out of 3
1978	Balkans Cup	Final	(Romania) Jiul Petroșani	4–1	0–1	4–2
1978–79	UEFA Cup Winners' Cup	R1	(Wales) Wrexham	3–0	0–2	3–2
1978–79	UEFA Cup Winners' Cup	R2	(Belgium) Beveren	0–0	0–2	0–2
1979–80	Balkans Cup	Group; A	(Greece) PAS Giannina	2–1	3–1	1st out of 3
1979–80	Balkans Cup	Group; A	(Albania) Partizani	3–0	1–4	1st out of 3
1979–80	Balkans Cup	Final	(Romania) Sportul Studențesc	1–1	0–2	1–3
1979–80	UEFA Cup Winners' Cup	R1	(Belgium) Germinal Beerschot	2–1	0–0	2–1
1979–80	UEFA Cup Winners' Cup	R2	(Czechoslovakia) Lokomotíva Košice	3–0	0–2	3–2
1979–80	UEFA Cup Winners' Cup	QF	(Italy) Juventus	0–0	0–2	0–2
1984–85	UEFA Cup	R1	(Spain) Real Valladolid	4–1	0–1	4–2
1984–85	UEFA Cup	R2	(Spain) Real Madrid	3–1	0–3	3–4
1985–86	Mitropa Cup	SF	(Hungary) Debreceni	0–1^{†}		–
1985–86	Mitropa Cup	3rd Pl.	(Czechoslovakia) Sigma Olomouc	3–2^{†}		–
1986–87	UEFA Cup	R1	(Belgium) Standard Liège	0–1	1–1	1–2
1999–00	UEFA Champions League	QR2	(Federal Republic of Yugoslavia) Partizan	0–3	1–3	1–6
2000–01	UEFA Cup	QR	(Malta) Valletta	3–2	5–4 (aet)	8–6
2000–01	UEFA Cup	R1	(Spain) Celta Vigo	0–1 (aet)	0–0	0–1
2002	UEFA Intertoto Cup	R1	(Republic of Ireland) St Patrick's Athletic	3–2	0–1	3–3 (a)
2004–05	UEFA Cup	QR2	(Turkey) Gençlerbirliği	2–1	0–1	2–2 (a)
2005–06	UEFA Cup	QR2	(Bulgaria) Litex Lovech	2–1	0–1	2–2 (a)
2006–07	UEFA Cup	QR1	(Cyprus) Omonia	2–2	1–2	3–4
2008	UEFA Intertoto Cup	R1	(North Macedonia) Renova	0–0	0–2	0–2
2009–10	UEFA Europa League	QR2	(Luxembourg) Differdange	3–0	0–1	3–1
2009–10	UEFA Europa League	QR3	(Ukraine) Metalist Kharkiv	1–2	0–2	1–4
2013–14	UEFA Europa League	QR2	(Wales) Prestatyn Town	5–0	3–0	8–0
2013–14	UEFA Europa League	QR3	(Slovakia) Žilina	2–1	1–1	3–2
2013–14	UEFA Europa League	PO	(Germany) VfB Stuttgart	2–1	2–2	4–3
2013–14	UEFA Europa League	Group I	(Portugal) Vitória de Guimarães	0–0	0–4	4th out of 4
2013–14	UEFA Europa League	Group I	(Spain) Real Betis	1–1	0–0	4th out of 4
2013–14	UEFA Europa League	Group I	(France) Lyon	1–1	0–1	4th out of 4
2014–15	UEFA Europa League	QR2	(Hungary) Ferencváros	1–0	2–1	3–1
2014–15	UEFA Europa League	QR3	(Faroe Islands) Víkingur	4–0	5–1	9–1
2014–15	UEFA Europa League	PO	(Moldova) Sheriff Tiraspol	1–0	3–0	4–0
2014–15	UEFA Europa League	Group G	(Belgium) Standard Liège	2–0	0–2	3rd out of 4
2014–15	UEFA Europa League	Group G	(Spain) Sevilla	2–2	0–1	3rd out of 4
2014–15	UEFA Europa League	Group G	(Netherlands) Feyenoord	3–1	0–2	3rd out of 4
2015–16	UEFA Europa League	QR2	(Scotland) Aberdeen	0–3	2–2	2–5
2016–17	UEFA Europa League	QR3	(Turkey) İstanbul Başakşehir	2–2	0–0	2–2 (a)
2017–18	UEFA Champions League	QR2	(Wales) The New Saints	2–0	5–1	7–1
2017–18	UEFA Champions League	QR3	(Austria) Red Bull Salzburg	0–0	1–1	1–1 (a)
2017–18	UEFA Champions League	PO	(Greece) Olympiacos	0–1	1–2	1–3
2017–18	UEFA Europa League	Group D	(Greece) AEK Athens	1–2	2–2	3rd out of 4
2017–18	UEFA Europa League	Group D	(Italy) Milan	2–0	2–3	3rd out of 4
2017–18	UEFA Europa League	Group D	Austria Wien	1–4	3–1	3rd out of 4
2018–19	UEFA Europa League	QR3	(Norway) Sarpsborg 08	0–1	1–1	1–2
2019–20	UEFA Europa League	QR3	(Scotland) Aberdeen	2–0	2–0	4–0
2019–20	UEFA Europa League	PO	(Belgium) Gent	1–1	1–2	2–3
2020–21	UEFA Europa League	QR3	(Ukraine) Kolos Kovalivka	2–0 (aet)	—N/a	—N/a
2020–21	UEFA Europa League	PO	(Denmark) Copenhagen	—N/a	1–0	—N/a
2020–21	UEFA Europa League	Group F	(Italy) Napoli	1–2	0–2	4th out of 4
2020–21	UEFA Europa League	Group F	(Spain) Real Sociedad	0–1	2–2	4th out of 4
2020–21	UEFA Europa League	Group F	(Netherlands) AZ Alkmaar	2–1	1–4	4th out of 4
2021–22	UEFA Conference League	QR2	(Malta) Gżira United	1–0	2–0	3–0
2021–22	UEFA Conference League	QR3	(Scotland) Hibernian	4–1	1–1	5−2
2021–22	UEFA Conference League	PO	(Greece) PAOK	0–2	1–1	1–3
2022–23	UEFA Conference League	QR2	(Sweden) Djurgården	1–2	0–2	1–4
2023–24	UEFA Conference League	QR2	(Kosovo) Dukagjini	6–1	1–0	7–1
2023–24	UEFA Conference League	QR3	(Faroe Islands) B36 Tórshavn	2–0	3–1	5–1
2023–24	UEFA Conference League	PO	(France) Lille	1–1 (aet)	1–2	2–3
2024–25	UEFA Europa League	QR2	(Romania) Corvinul Hunedoara	1–0	0–0	1–0
2024–25	UEFA Europa League	QR3	(Sweden) Elfsborg	1–1	0–2	1–3
2024–25	UEFA Conference League	PO	(Slovenia) Olimpija Ljubljana	1–1	0–5	1–6
2025–26	UEFA Champions League	QR2	(Bulgaria) Ludogorets Razgrad	0–0	1–3 (aet)	1–3
2025–26	UEFA Europa League	QR3	(Republic of Ireland) Shelbourne	1–2	3–1	4–3
2025–26	UEFA Europa League	PO	(Greece) PAOK	1–0	0–5	1–5
2025–26	UEFA Conference League	LS	(Armenia) Noah	—N/a	0–1	16th out of 36
2025–26	UEFA Conference League	LS	(Czech Republic) Sparta Prague	1–0	—N/a	16th out of 36
2025–26	UEFA Conference League	LS	(Gibraltar) Lincoln Red Imps	—N/a	1–1	16th out of 36
2025–26	UEFA Conference League	LS	(Cyprus) AEK Larnaca	0–0	—N/a	16th out of 36
2025–26	UEFA Conference League	LS	(Slovenia) Celje	3–0	—N/a	16th out of 36
2025–26	UEFA Conference League	LS	(Ukraine) Shakhtar Donetsk	—N/a	0–0	16th out of 36
2025–26	UEFA Conference League	KPO	(Cyprus) Omonia	3–1	1–0	4–1
2025–26	UEFA Conference League	R16	(France) Strasbourg	1–2	1–1	2–3
2026–27	UEFA Conference League	QR2	(Republic of Ireland) Derry City	1–0	1–0	2–0
2026–27	UEFA Conference League	QR3	(Finland) Ilves	1–0	1–1	2–1
2026–27	UEFA Conference League	PO	(Denmark) Midtjylland	1–4	0–2	1–6

Last updated on 27 August 2026.
Note: List includes matches played in competitions not endorsed by UEFA.
^{†} Matches played at neutral ground in Ascoli and Pisa, Italy.

=== Player records ===
- Most appearances in UEFA club competitions: 38 appearances
  - Zoran Kvržić
  - Ivan Tomečak
- Top scorer in UEFA club competitions: 8 goals
  - Andrej Kramarić

=== UEFA coefficient ===
Correct as of 5 July 2026.

Rank	Team	Points
104	(Slovenia) Olimpija Ljubljana	16.375
105	(Spain) Celta Vigo	16.250
106	(Croatia) Rijeka	16.125
107	(Germany) Borussia Mönchengladbach	16.000
108	(Spain) Girona	15.723
