= Mladen Vranković =

Croatian footballer (1937–2021)

Personal information
- Full name: Mladen Vranković
- Date of birth: 2 July 1937
- Place of birth: Rtina, Kingdom of Yugoslavia
- Date of death: 12 February 2021 (aged 83)
- Place of death: Rijeka, Croatia
- Position: Defender

Senior career*
Years	Team	Apps	(Gls)
1960–1968	Rijeka	350	(5)
1968–1971	Kansas City Spurs	56	(1)

Managerial career
- 1987–1989: Rijeka
- 1989–1990: Šibenik
- 1991: Rijeka
- 1991: Sydney Croatia
- 1991–1992: Orijent
- 1995: Rijeka
- 2000: Zadar
- * Club domestic league appearances and goals

Mladen Vranković (2 July 1937 – 12 February 2021) was a Croatian football player and manager.

== Career ==
Born in Rtina, he played for his hometown club, HNK Rijeka, for eight seasons, collecting 350 caps. He also spent three years in the North American Soccer League playing for Kansas City Spurs. Following the end of his career he became a manager. He was Rijeka's manager between 1987 and 1989, leading the club to the 1986–87 Yugoslav Cup final against Hajduk Split. He briefly coached Australian club Sydney Croatia in the now defunct Australian National Soccer League during the 1991–92 season.

== Managerial statistics ==
Club	From	To	Competition	Record				
Club	From	To	Competition	P	W	D	L	Win %
NK Rijeka	22 February 1987	16 December 1990	First League	85	30	26	29	35.29
NK Rijeka	22 February 1987	16 December 1990	Yugoslav Cup	5	1	2	2	20.00
Sydney Croatia	6 October 1991	7 December 1991	NSL	10	1	3	6	10.00
NK Rijeka	16 February 1992	16 February 1992	First League	1	0	1	0	0.00
HNK Rijeka	2 April 1995	9 April 1995	Prva HNL	2	1	1	0	50.00
Totals				103	33	33	37	32.04

*Dates of first and last games under Vranković; not dates of official appointments

== Honours ==
Kansas City Spurs

- NASL: 1969
- Western Conference: 1968, 1969
