= Anđelo Milevoj =

Croatian footballer

- Milevoj

Personal information
- Full name: Anđelo Milevoj
- Date of birth: 26 March 1941 (age 85)
- Place of birth: Labin, Italy
- Position: Defender

Youth career
- Rudar Labin

Senior career*
Years	Team	Apps	(Gls)
1963–1970	Rijeka	200	(0)
1970–1972	Olimpija Ljubljana	37	(2)

International career
1966	Yugoslavia	4	(0)
- * Club domestic league appearances and goals

Anđelo Milevoj (born 26 March 1941) is a Croatian retired football player. He was named Best Defender of the Yugoslav First League for two consecutive seasons (1967 and 1968).

== Club career ==
Born in Labin, as a player, he was widely regarded as one of HNK Rijeka's best defenders of all time. He spent seven years in Rijeka, collecting 200 caps. He also spent two years with Olimpija Ljubljana.

== International career ==
He has made four appearances for the Yugoslavia national team (against the USSR, Bulgaria, Czechoslovakia and Israel), all friendlies in 1966.

== Honours ==
HNK Rijeka

- Yugoslav Second League: 1969–70
- Yugoslav First League 4th place: 1964–65, 1965–66

Olimpija Ljubljana

- Yugoslav Cup runner-up: 1970

=== Individual ===
- Best Defender of the Yugoslav First League: 1967, 1968
- NK Rijeka all time XI

== Career statistics ==
=== Club ===
Club performance			League	
Season	Club	League	Apps	Goals
Yugoslavia			League	
1963–64	NK Rijeka	Yugoslav First League	25	0
1964–65	NK Rijeka	Yugoslav First League	28	0
1965–66	NK Rijeka	Yugoslav First League	28	0
1966–67	NK Rijeka	Yugoslav First League	30	0
1967–68	NK Rijeka	Yugoslav First League	30	0
1968–69	NK Rijeka	Yugoslav First League	33	0
1969–70	NK Rijeka	Yugoslav Second League	26	0
NK Rijeka total			200	0
1970–71	Olimpija Ljubljana	Yugoslav First League	19	2
1971–72	Olimpija Ljubljana	Yugoslav First League	18	0
Olimpija Ljubljana total			37	2
Career total			237	2
