= Marijan Jantoljak =

Croatian footballer (1940–2025)

Personal information
- Date of birth: 7 February 1940
- Place of birth: Zagreb, Kingdom of Yugoslavia
- Date of death: 10 April 2025 (aged 85)
- Place of death: Rijeka, Croatia
- Position: Goalkeeper

Senior career*
Years	Team	Apps	(Gls)
- Ponikve Zagreb
–1958	Radnički Nova Pazova		
1958–1960	Jedinstvo Zemun		
1960–1971	Rijeka	413	(15)
1971–1976	Borac Banja Luka	116	(1)
1976–1977	Metalac Sisak	23	(3)
1977–1978	Segesta Sisak	27	(0)

International career
1966	Yugoslavia	2	(0)

Managerial career
- Segesta Sisak
- Karlovac
- 1991–1992: Rijeka
- 1992–1993: Halubjan
- 1994: Inker Zaprešić
- 1994–1995: Karlovac
- Naprijed Hrijeljina
- 1994–1995: Koper
- 1995: Rijeka
- Rovinj
- Poreč
- Draga
- Opatija
- Orijent Rijeka
- Pomorac Kostrena
- Krk
- * Club domestic league appearances and goals

Marijan Jantoljak (7 February 1940 – 10 April 2025) was a Croatian football player and manager who played as a goalkeeper.

== Playing career ==
=== Club ===
Born in Zagreb, he started playing in a local club NK Ponikve. In his early career he also played with FK Radnički Nova Pazova from where, in summer 1958, he joined Jedinstvo Zemun. In the 1959–60 season he joined Rijeka and stayed in the club until 1972. That year he moved to Borac Banja Luka and played another five seasons there. By the end of his career he played with Yugoslav Second League sides Metalac Sisak and HNK Segesta.

As a player, he was the most capped goalkeeper of all time for HNK Rijeka. He also scored 15 goals during his time in Rijeka as he was a regular penalty kick taker. During the 1969–70 season, he did not concede a goal for 917 minutes, a record for any Rijeka goalkeeper.

=== International ===
Jantoljak made his debut for Yugoslavia in an October 1966 friendly match away against Israel, coming on as a 66th-minute substitute for Ilija Pantelić, and earned a total of two caps scoring no goals. His second and final international was a November 1966 friendly away against Bulgaria.

== Managerial career ==
After retiring green at the age of 39, Jantoljak became a coach. Among other clubs, he managed HNK Rijeka during the 1991–92 and 1995 seasons.

== Death ==
Jantoljak died in Rijeka, Croatia on 10 April 2025, at the age of 85.
