= Florent Shehu =

Albanian footballer (born 2002)

Personal information
- Date of birth: 17 May 2002 (age 24)
- Place of birth: Pontarlier, France
- Height: 1.84 m (6 ft 0 in)
- Position: Attacking midfielder

Team information
- Current team: Rijeka

Youth career
- Yverdon-Sport
- FC Basel
- Lausanne-Sport
- 2013–2014: Barcelona
- 2014–2015: Valencia
- 2015–2016: FC Basel
- 2016–2019: Levante
- 2019–2022: Lazio

Senior career*
Years	Team	Apps	(Gls)
2022–2023	Luzern U21	16	(0)
2023–2024	Adana Demirspor	6	(0)
2024	→ Zrinski Osječko 1664 (loan)	0	(0)
2025	Opatija	18	(1)
2026–	Rijeka		

International career
2018	Switzerland U17	2	(0)
2019	Albania U19	2	(0)
- * Club domestic league appearances and goals as of 12 January 2026

Florent Shehu (born 17 May 2002) is a footballer who plays as a midfielder for Croatian club Rijeka. Born in France and raised in Switzerland, he is a youth international for Albania.

== Early life ==
Shehu was born in 2002 in France. He grew up in Yverdon, Switzerland.

== Career ==
Shehu is a youth product of Yverdon-Sport, FC Basel, Lausanne-Sport, Barcelona, Valencia, Levante, Lazio and Luzern. In 2023, Shehu signed for Turkish side Adana Demirspor. On 27 January 2024, he debuted for the club during a 0–1 loss to Hatayspor. He was subsequently loaned to Zrinski Osječko 1664 in Croatia but played no matches there.

== International career ==
Shehu was born in France to Albanian parents, and moved to Switzerland at a young age and holds all three nationalities. He is a former youth international for Switzerland, having played twice for the Switzerland U17s in 2018. In 2019, he played twice for the Albania U19s.
