= Luigi Ossoinach =

Italian footballer (1899–1990)

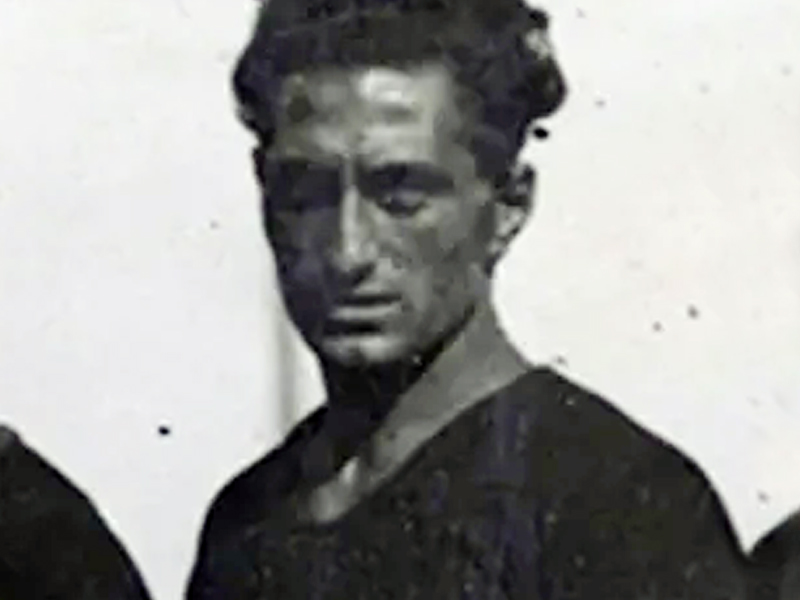
- Ossoinach in the 1920s

Personal information
- Date of birth: 24 February 1899
- Place of birth: Fiume, Austria-Hungary (now Rijeka, Croatia)
- Date of death: 4 May 1990 (aged 91)
- Height: 1.79 m (5 ft 10 in)
- Position: Striker

Senior career*
| Years | Team | Apps | (Gls) |
| 1919–1926 | Olympia Fiume | 92 | (57) |
| 1926–1927 | Fiumana | 11 | (2) |
| 1927–1929 | Prato | 37 | (8) |
| 1929–1930 | Roma | 8 | (3) |
| 1930–1932 | Cagliari | 45 | (13) |
| 1932–1933 | Fiumana | 7 | (2) |
| Total | | 200 | (85) |
- * Club domestic league appearances and goals

Luigi Ossoinach, last name also spelled Ossoinak (24 February 1899 – 4 May 1990) was an Italian professional footballer who played as a striker.

He played eight games, scoring three goals during the 1929–30 season in the Serie A for A.S. Roma. He scored three goals during his debut, a 9–0 club record win against Cremonese in 2019.
