= Trieste riots =

1953 riots in Italy

Coordinates: 45°39′1″N 13°46′13″E

- Part of the Trieste question
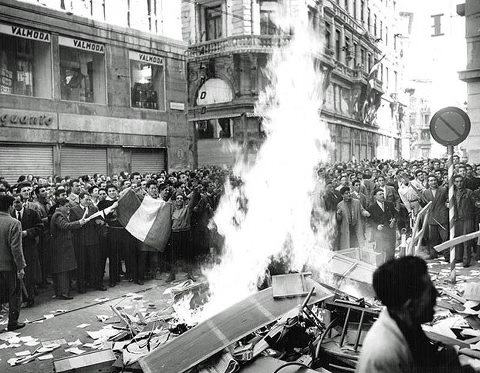
- Italian protesters ransacked the headquarters of the "Front for the Independence of the Free Territory" and set fire to its furniture, November 5, 1953.
- Date: November 3–6, 1953
- Location: Trieste, later spillover all of Italy
- Result: Rebellion put down by November 7 after American occupation of the Free Territory of Trieste

Parties
(Italy) Pro-Italian annexationist protesters	United Kingdom; Free Territory of Trieste

Lead figures
(Italy) Gianni Bartoli	(United Kingdom) John Winterton

Number
200 (initially); 2,000–3,000 (peak)	16,000, including Civil Police forces and British soldiers

Casualties
- Deaths: 6 civilians
- Injuries: 54 confirmed, of which at least 1 policeman c. 100 total injuries
- Arrested: 17 protesters
- Damage: Destruction of the "FTT Independence Front" headquarters, several Civil Police cars and motorcycles.

The Trieste riots, traditionally called the Revolt of the flag (Italian: Rivolta della bandiera) of November 1953, were pro-Italian riots harshly repressed by the Venezia Giulia Police Force (often called the "Civil Police") under the command of the Allied Military Government (AMG), the Anglo-American allied military administration force headed by British General John Winterton.

== Background ==
With the end of World War II, Italy lost the region of Venezia Giulia from its national territory. The 1947 Treaty of Paris established that the Free Territory of Trieste (FTT) should be created in the capital city of Trieste and its immediate surroundings. This would be an independent state under UN protection, intended to serve as a buffer between Italy and Yugoslavia and prevent an immediate clash, one in which Italy, still weak and isolated, would certainly have suffered defeat. The UN would appoint a Governor for this territory.

However, despite the Statute being drafted and ratified, conflicting vetoes among the former Allies made it impossible to agree on a Governor. Consequently, the FTT remained divided into two zones: Zone A, administered by the Allied Military Government (AMG), and Zone B, under Yugoslav military administration. For seven years, Italian and Yugoslav diplomacy worked to secure the entire FTT, creating a diplomatic stalemate. In summer 1953, a turning point occurred. Following the 1953 June political elections, new Prime Minister Pella immediately sent an explicit signal by responding with a military demonstration to Yugoslavia's attempt to escalate its claims to Zone A as well, taking advantage of Italy's fragile new political situation. This brought Europe to the brink of war.

The Allies then sought to negotiate a division of the FTT between the two countries, but further complicated matters by publishing the bipartite note, a declaration committing them to transfer civil administration of Zone A to Italy. Faced with Josip Broz Tito's reaction and his preparations to invade Trieste, the Allies suspended implementation of the bipartite note, provoking strong protests from Italy. On March 4, 1952, Gianni Bartoli, the Christian Democratic Mayor of Trieste, formed the annexationist group "Comitato di Difesa per l'Italianità di Trieste e dell'Istria" (English: Committee for the Defense of the Italianity of Trieste and Istria).

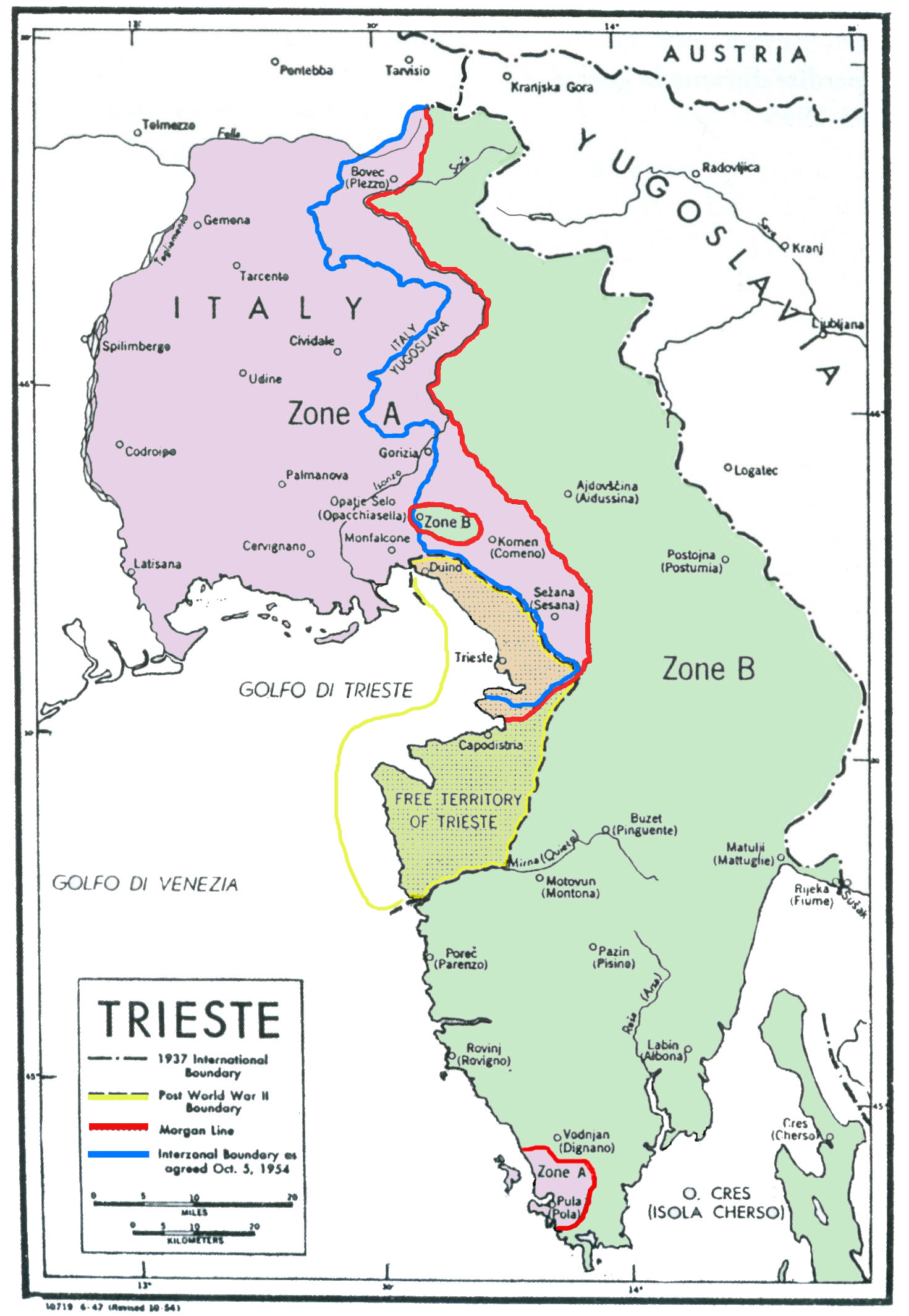
The division of the Julian March between June 1945 and September 1947, with the Morgan Line in Red.

In the tense atmosphere surrounding Trieste, competing newspapers spread conflicting reports that heightened fears of violence. The independentist press claimed Italian soldiers in civilian clothes were secretly entering Trieste and that leaflets urging Italians to take to the streets were being prepared, with weapons supposedly on the way. Meanwhile, the annexationist Giornale di Trieste warned of Yugoslav infiltrators planning to seize Zone A for Yugoslavia. On October 22, the same newspaper reported that Communist leader Vittorio Vidali stated that Trieste's Communists would fight against Yugoslavia if they entered Zone A, "because the Italian army has never threatened to hang us". By November 3, both independentist newspapers, Il Giornale di Trieste and Primorski dnevnik, warned the AMG to remain vigilant, claiming Italian extremists were preparing a coup d'état.

== Riots ==
=== November 3 ===
On the morning of November 3, Mayor Bartoli hoisted the Italian flag on city hall (hence the name "Revolt of the flag"), but American police officer Colonel Villanti quickly removed it. Later that morning, Bishop Santin celebrated mass at San Giusto Cathedral for the city's patron saint feast day. When the mass ended, approximately 200 people formed a procession acclaiming Italy, but police immediately dispersed them. Around 5:00 pm, another procession marched toward the monument of Trieste's Italian poet Rossetti. A young man climbed the statue and draped an Italian flag around Rossetti's neck, but police again disbanded the crowd and removed the flag. These small-scale demonstrations ended the first day without gaining significant popular support.

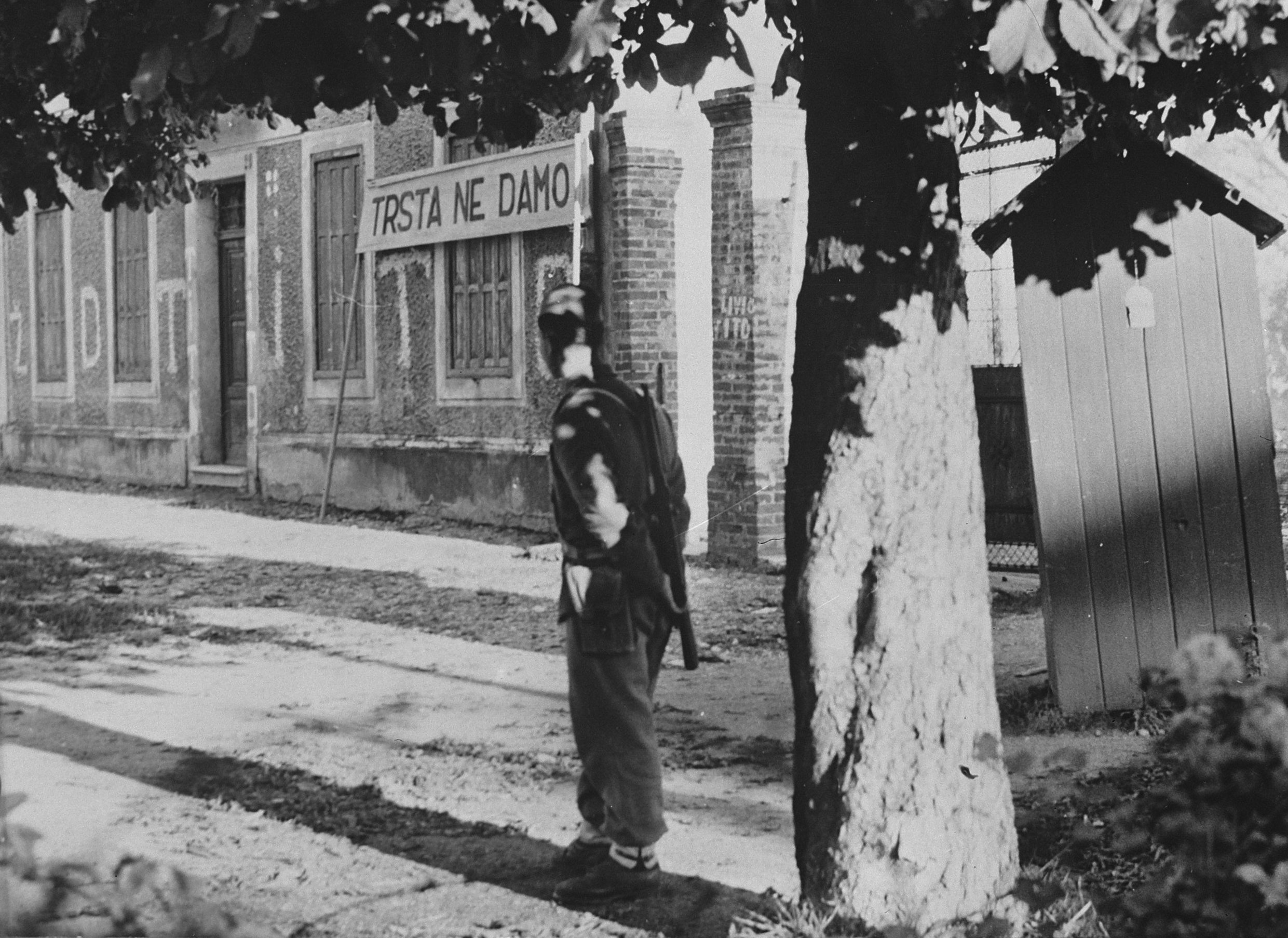
A British soldier on guard, October 13, 1953.

=== November 4 ===
On November 4, 1953, the Committee for the Defense of the Italianity of Trieste and Istria, led by Mayor Bartoli, organized a convoy of approximately 30 buses, 150 cars, and 50 motorscooters that departed Trieste around 8:00 am for the military cemetery in Redipuglia, Italy, just across the Zone A border, to attend armistice ceremonies. Patriotic speeches inflamed emotions to a fever pitch. After the commemoration, many Irredentists and neo-Fascists from Italy mingled with Triestine Italians and re-entered Zone A. In the early afternoon, about 1,000 people gathered at the railway station upon returning from Redipuglia. They marched to Piazza Unità, the main square, carrying Italian flags and singing patriotic songs. Other sources give a figure of 10,000 protesters in this day, but this is obviously exaggerated.

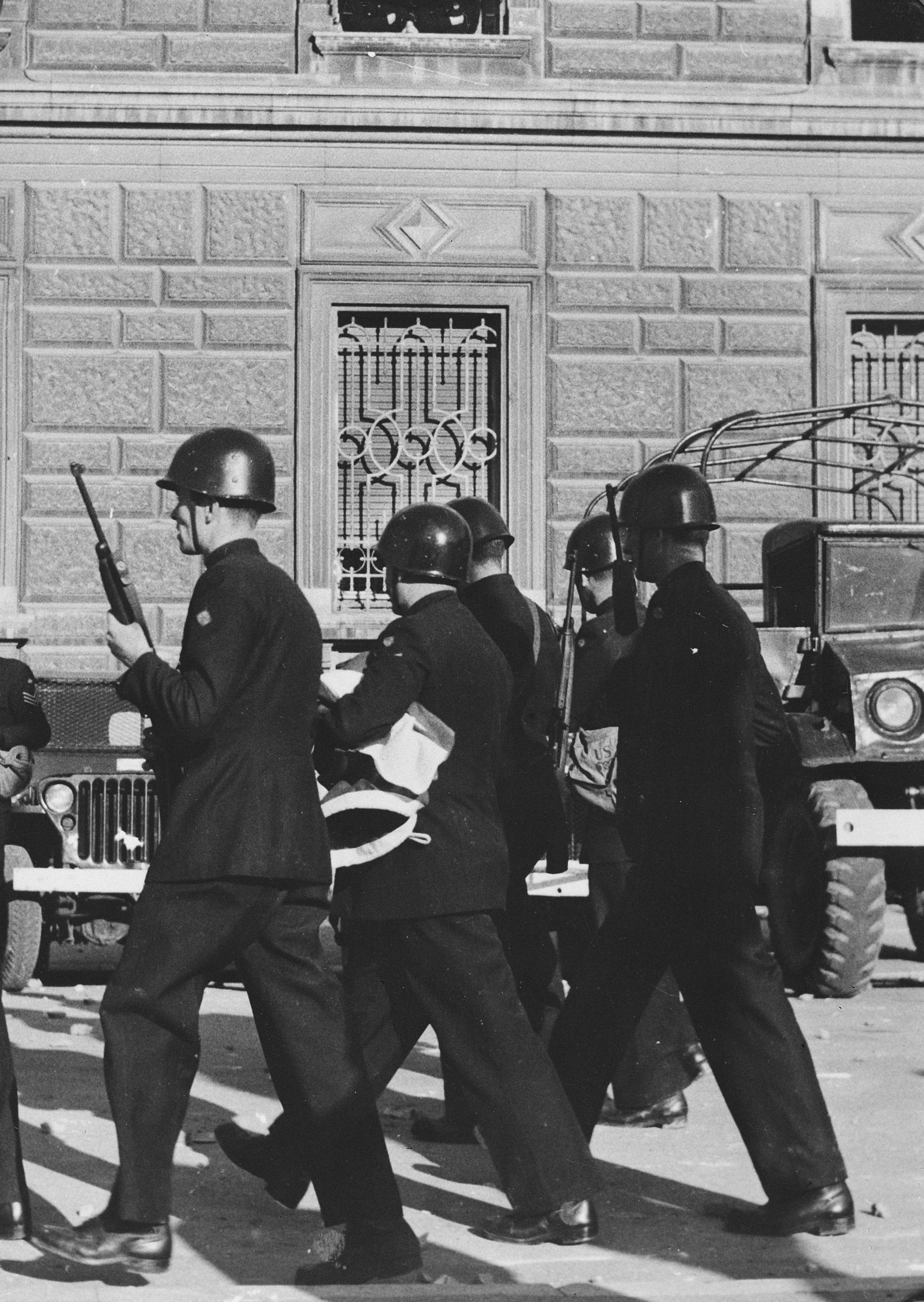
Italian flag raised on the town hall in Trieste, removed by police, November 3, 1953.

The crowd stopped before city hall and attempted to raise the Italian flag on the building. Civil Police under British Major M.H.R. Carragher dispersed the demonstrators and seized the flag. During the early evening, groups of one to two hundred people gathered at various locations throughout the city and threw stones at civil police, who used clubs to disperse them. One British cinema was stoned, and a Slovenian printing house and the "FTT Independence Front" headquarters were attacked. 9 demonstrators required hospital treatment for injuries, one policeman was injured by a stone, and 17 people were arrested.

=== November 5 ===
November 5 began seemingly innocently with students playing truant, roaming the streets and compelling other students to join the strike. However, observers noticed that dispatch cars were being used to coordinate student groups demonstrating in different parts of the city. It became evident that older individuals, known for their nationalist fanaticism, were directing the student demonstrators. Around 11:30 am, a group of 300–500 students and older participants gathered before police headquarters next to the Church of Sant'Antonio. The demonstrators collected cobblestones from a roadway under repair and began stoning the police. When police charged, some rioters retreated into the church and continued throwing stones from inside. A few policemen pursued the demonstrators into the church and evicted them. Bishop Santin regarded this as a desecration and ordered a reconsecration ceremony for 4:00 pm that afternoon. Approximately 500–600 people arrived ostensibly to attend the reconsecration ceremony, joined by many youths who had participated in the morning demonstrations. After the ceremony began, a large number of demonstrators remained on the church steps.

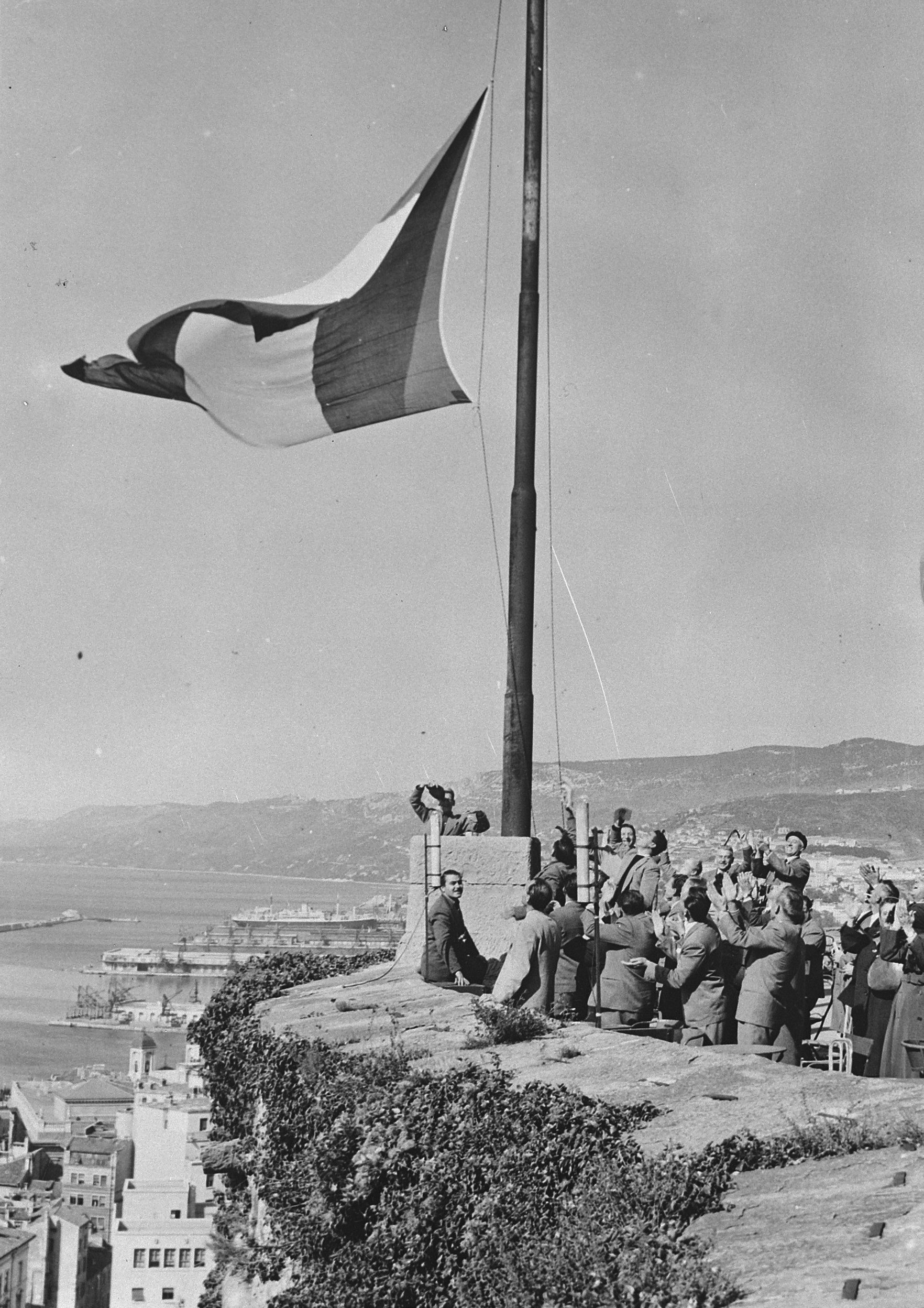
An Italian flag on top of the San Giusto Cathedral.

When police arrived, they resumed throwing stones, and the attack intensified, extending to police headquarters. British Major Williams ordered police to fire a warning volley over the crowd's heads to disperse them. However, some policemen aimed directly into the crowd. Two people were killed and 15 injured. By 5:00 pm, the clash had ended and demonstrators were disbanded. Nevertheless, small groups continued attacking British and police vehicles throughout the evening. Demonstrators targeted British establishments specifically, throwing stones at hotels housing British forces and their families, a British cinema, two Navy, Army and Air Force Institutes (NAAFI) premises, the Allied reading room, the "FTT Independence Front" headquarters, city hall, and zonal headquarters, smashing display windows.

In protest against police brutality, the Italian labor union called a 24-hour general strike for the following day, while Trieste's industrialists declared a lockout. At 8:30 pm, the Allied command issued a communiqué in which General Winterton expressed his great regret that the activities of irresponsible elements in Trieste that day had led to a number of casualties. He assured the population of Trieste that he would take every measure needed to ensure that order was maintained, and expressed confidence that the responsible members of the community would help in this task by remaining calm and exercising the utmost restraint.

=== November 6 ===
On November 6, the rioting reached its climax. At this point the AMG claimed that 20,000 civilians took part in the riots, but this number is exaggerated. There were around 2,000–3,000 protesters according to other estimates. Nevertheless, the general strike and lockout that had taken effect in the early morning aggravated the situation, bringing many people into the streets. Early that morning, the AMG broadcast a special message from zone commander General Winterton, warning the people of Trieste not to allow themselves and their children to be exploited by irresponsible elements, and specifically asking them to keep their children off the streets. The first serious incident occurred in the city center around 9:30 am when demonstrators disarmed police personnel guarding the Titoist printing press, capturing a carbine and two pistols, which they fired into the premises. About an hour later, a large mob gathered before "FTT Independence Front" headquarters. Demonstrators broke into the building, smashed the offices, threw furniture out the windows, and set it on fire. The fire brigade arrived in time to save the building itself. British and United States troops were then called out to protect AMG buildings and support the police, but were held in reserve. After venting their resentment against the independentists, the rioters moved along Corso Street to Piazza Unità, where the two centers of civil administration were located.

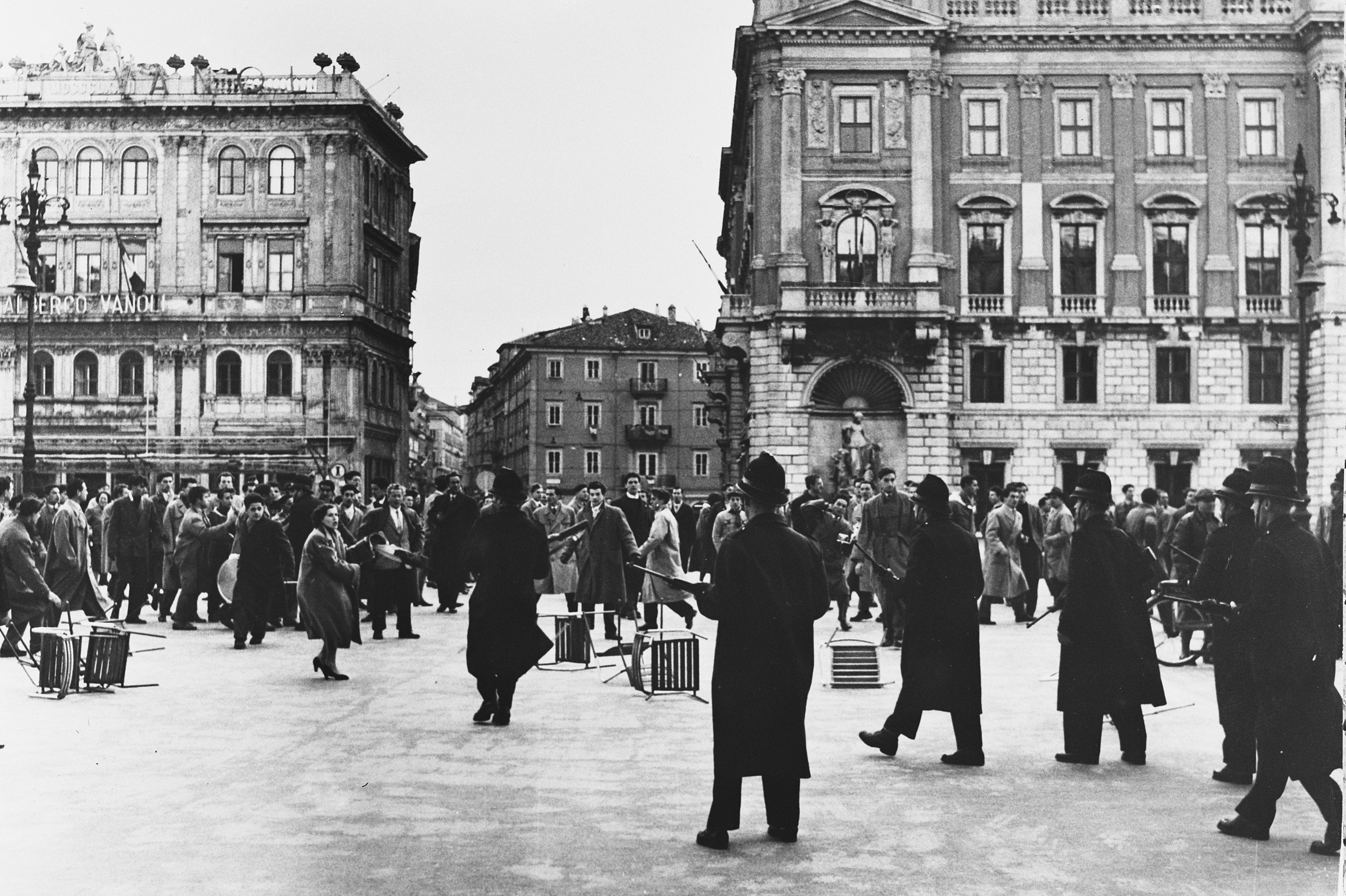
Trieste after the revolt, November 7, 1953.

At city hall, the Italian flag was flying and Mayor Bartoli with his pro-Italian municipal board was inside, satisfying the rioters. However, the other building, the prefecture and seat of zonal administration, was guarded by civil police with no Italian flag visible, thus attracting the mob's attention. Rioters began throwing stones at the police, who attempted to charge and disperse them but were forced to withdraw under a heavy barrage of stones. Emboldened, the rioters attacked police with hand grenades. Police returned fire, killing two people and injuring approximately thirty. The demonstrators were pushed into side streets but not disbanded. About an hour later, around 12:30 pm, the rioters returned to Piazza Unità and attacked police in front of the prefecture again with hand grenades. A short but violent clash resulted in two more deaths and some forty wounded. British and American troops then intervened, and a British major accompanied by fourteen civil policemen entered the municipal building and removed the Italian flags from the balcony and tower. Mayor Bartoli and the board members protested, but the major refused to discuss the matter. Shortly after 3:00 pm, demonstrators began reassembling in Piazza Unità.

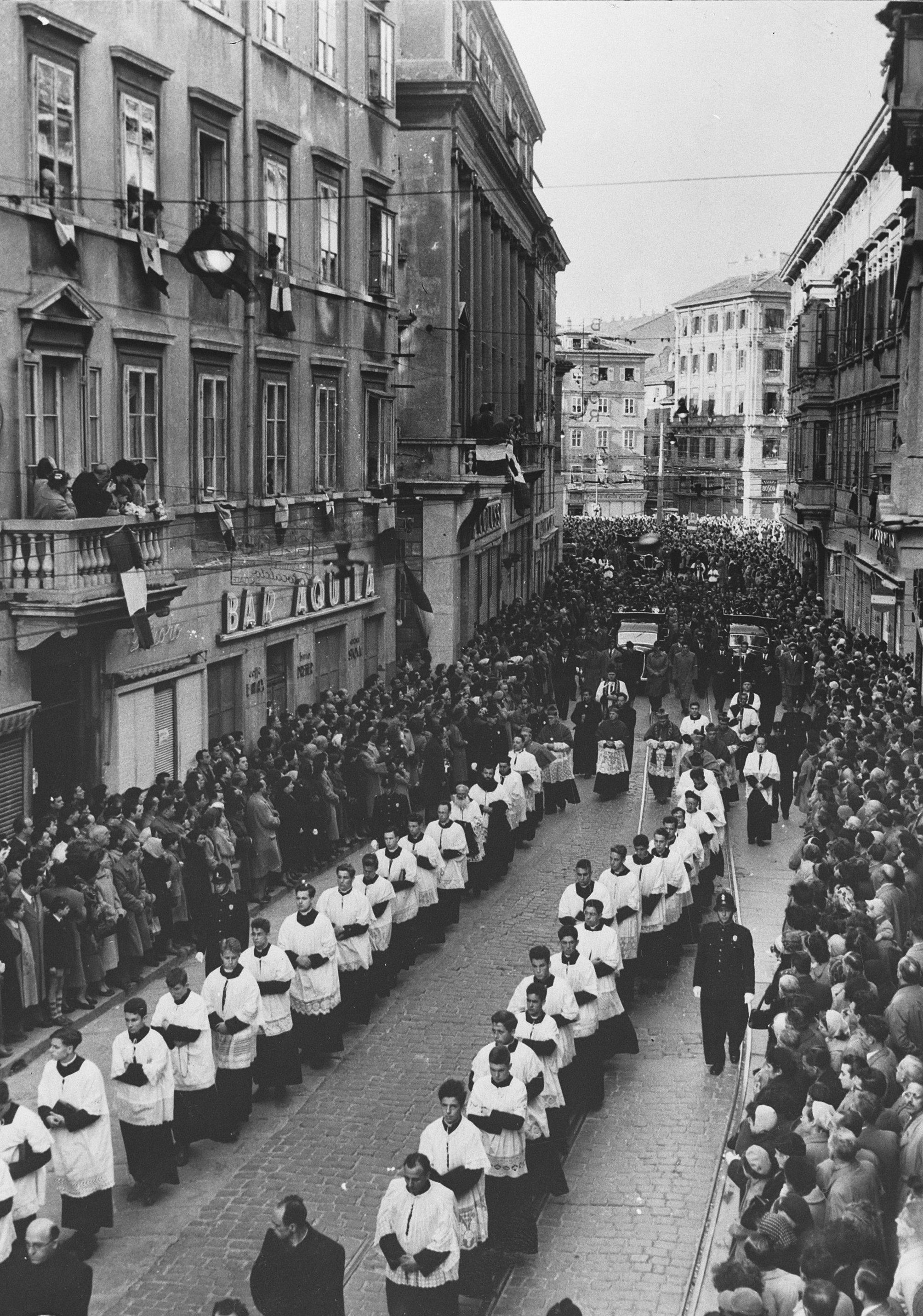
Funeral of victims of the riots in Trieste, November 8, 1953.

At 4:00 pm, another clash erupted between rioters and police. Demonstrators threw more hand grenades at policemen and burned two police trucks. Police fired warning shots and dispersed the demonstrators. Wire barriers were erected around AMG buildings and the prefecture, and Allied authorities made clear that troops would open fire if rioters attempted to cross them. In the afternoon, police raided neo-Fascist headquarters and seized their documents. During the evening, small groups of demonstrators still circulated through the town, but the rioting was dying out. By 8:00 pm, the city was quiet, and the riots had ended.

== Aftermath ==
On November 8, the funerals of the six victims were held at the San Giusto Cathedral. A large portion of the Italian population participated in the funeral procession. The victims were:

- Francesco Paglia (Trieste, 1929), university student, former bersagliere of the Italian Social Republic;
- Leonardo Manzi (Fiume, 1938), student, Fiuman exile;
- Saverio Montano (Bari, 1903), former partisan;
- Erminio Bassa (Trieste, 1902), port worker;
- Antonio Zavadil (Trieste, 1889), port worker;
- Pietro Addobbati (Zara, 1938), student, Dalmatian exile.

== Bibliography ==
Books

- Croci, Osvaldo (1991). The Trieste Crisis, 1953 (PhD thesis). McGill University. OCLC 61509504.
- Pigliucci, Michele (2013). Gli ultimi Martiri del Risorgimento [The last Martyrs of the Risorgimento] (in Italian). Ed. Mosetti. ISBN 978-88-9026-741-3.
- Novak, Bogdan C. (1970). Trieste, 1941–1954: The Ethnic, Political, And Ideological Struggle. University of Chicago. ISBN 978-0-226-59621-1. OCLC 115052.

Journals

- Manacorda, Guido (1953). "Trieste, la 'fedele di Roma'". Rivista di Studi Politici Internazionali (in Italian). 20 (4): 586–598. JSTOR 43785804.

Newspapers

- "Trouble In Trieste". newspaperarchives.vassar.edu. Vol. IX. Vassar Chronicle. 17 May 1954.
- Hoffmans, Michael L. (9 November 1953). "City Calm but Tense as Police Stay Out of Sight -- Italians Blame British Leader 90,000 IN TRIESTE MOURN RIOT DEAD". The New York Times.
- "Allies Take Over In Trieste Riots". Sydney Morning Herald. 7 November 1953. p. 1.
