= Radovin =

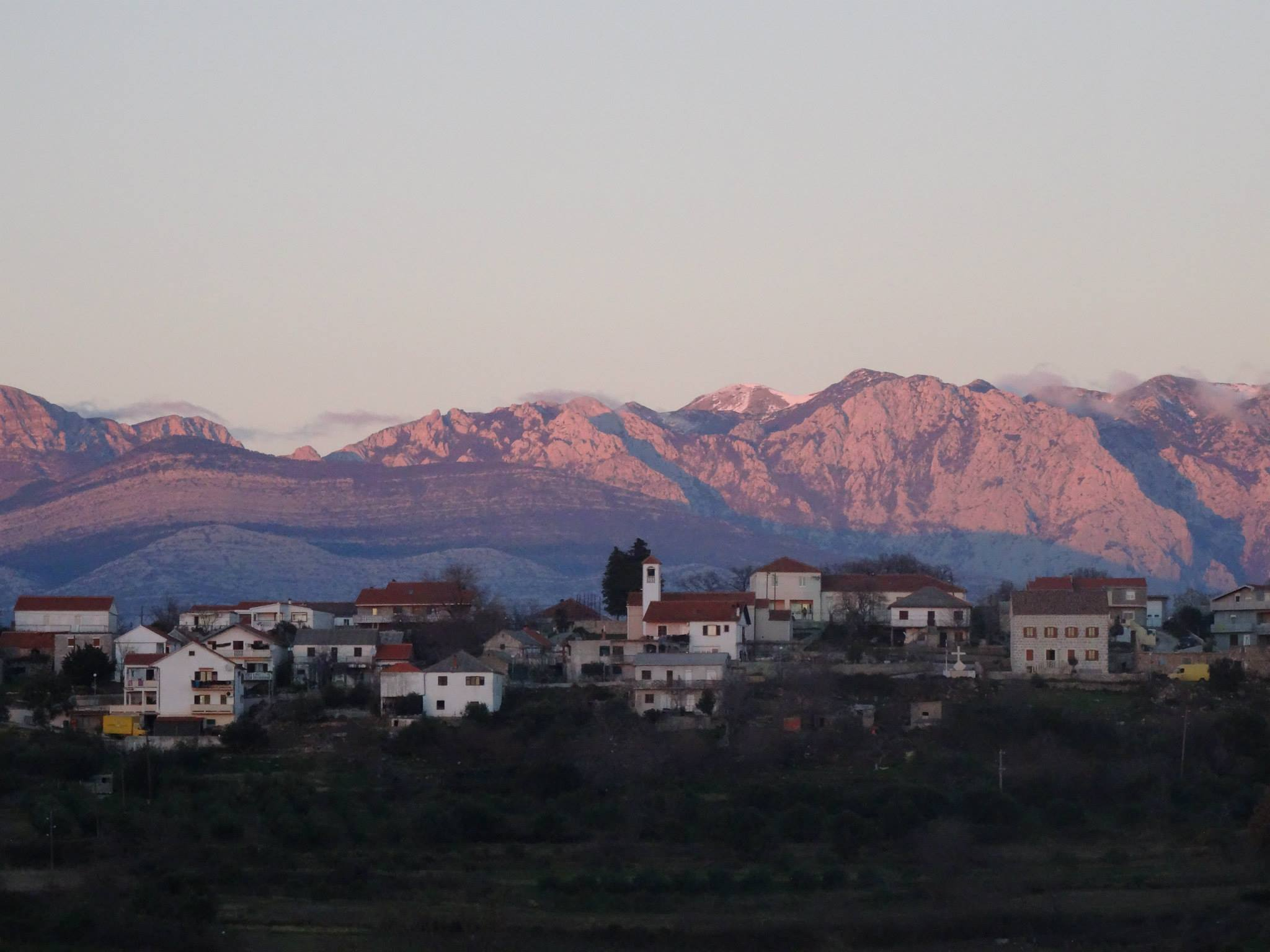

- Location within Croatia
- Coordinates: 44°14′N 15°23′E
- Country: Croatia
- County: Zadar
- Municipality: Ražanac

Area
  - Total: 9.9 km^{2} (3.8 sq mi)

Population (2021)
  - Total: 527
  - Density: 53/km^{2} (140/sq mi)
- Time zone: UTC+1 (CET)
  - Summer (DST): UTC+2 (CEST)

Radovin is a small village in Zadar County, Croatia, located near the city of Zadar and belongs to the municipality of Ražanac. The population is 549 people (census 2011).

There is few shops, churches, water sources and a cafe. Also there is a bicycle path for bicycle enthusiasts.
