= Ražanac =

- Municipality
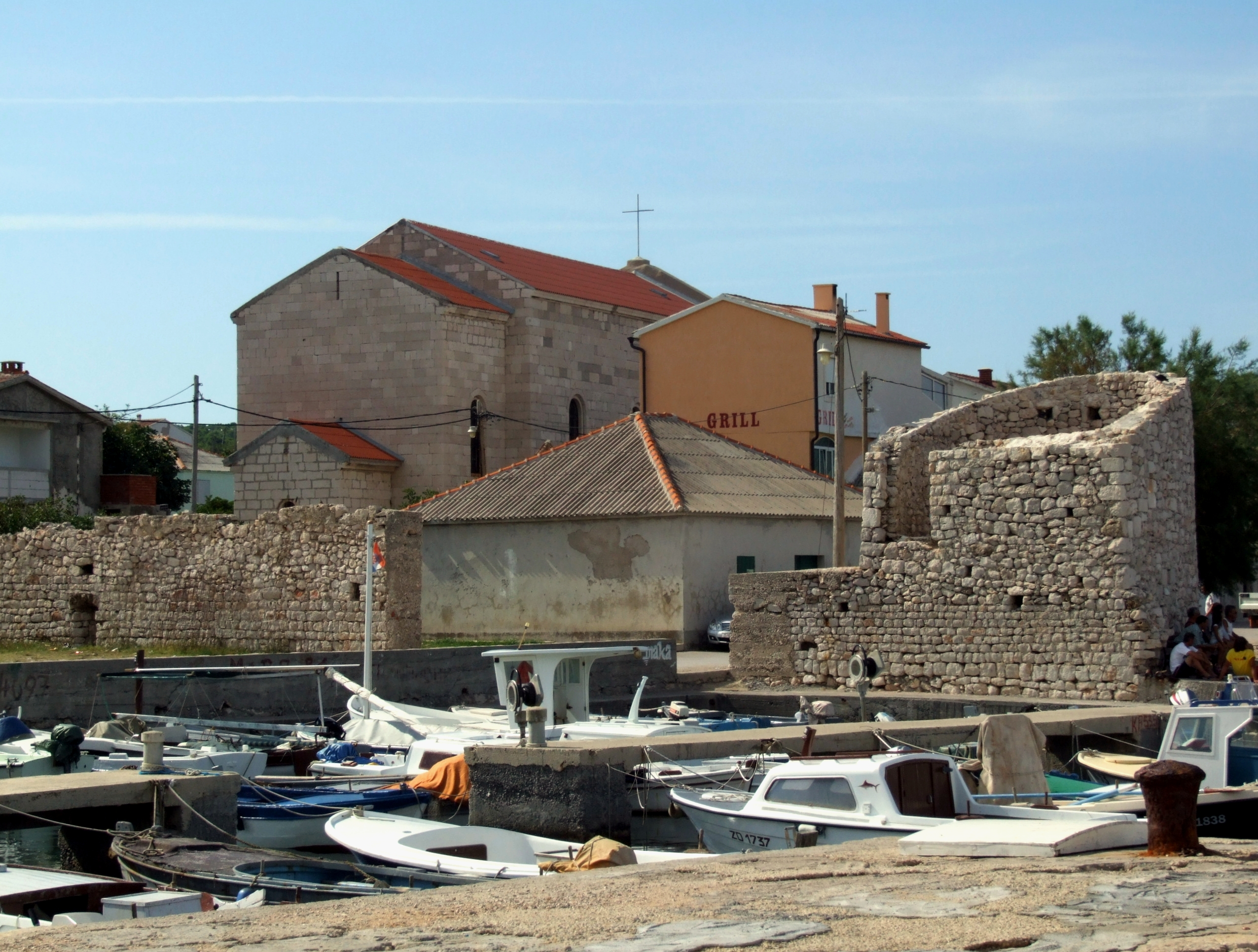
- City walls and harbour

- Location of Ražanac in Croatia
- Coordinates: 44°16′55″N 15°20′53″E
- Country: Croatia
- Region: Dalmatia
- County: Zadar County

Area
  - Municipality: 68.9 km^{2} (26.6 sq mi)
  - Urban: 12.5 km^{2} (4.8 sq mi)

Population (2021)
  - Municipality: 2,746
  - Density: 39.9/km^{2} (103/sq mi)
  - Urban: 883
  - Urban density: 70.6/km^{2} (183/sq mi)
- Website: opcina-razanac.hr

Ražanac is a village and municipality in the Zadar County in Croatia.

== Demographics ==
According to the 2011 census, the municipality had 2,940 inhabitants, 98% of which were Croats.

In 2021, the municipality had 2,746 residents in the following 6 settlements:

- Jovići, population 327
- Krneza, population 164
- Ljubač, population 402
- Radovin, population 527
- Ražanac, population 883
- Rtina, population 443
Ražanac: Population trends 1857–2021
v

population	1289	1100	1413	1687	1843	2103	2590	2825	3618	3956	3966	3767	3287	3805	3107	2940	2746
	1857	1869	1880	1890	1900	1910	1921	1931	1948	1953	1961	1971	1981	1991	2001	2011	2021

Sources: Croatian Bureau of Statistics publications
