= Juraj Baraković =

Croatian poet

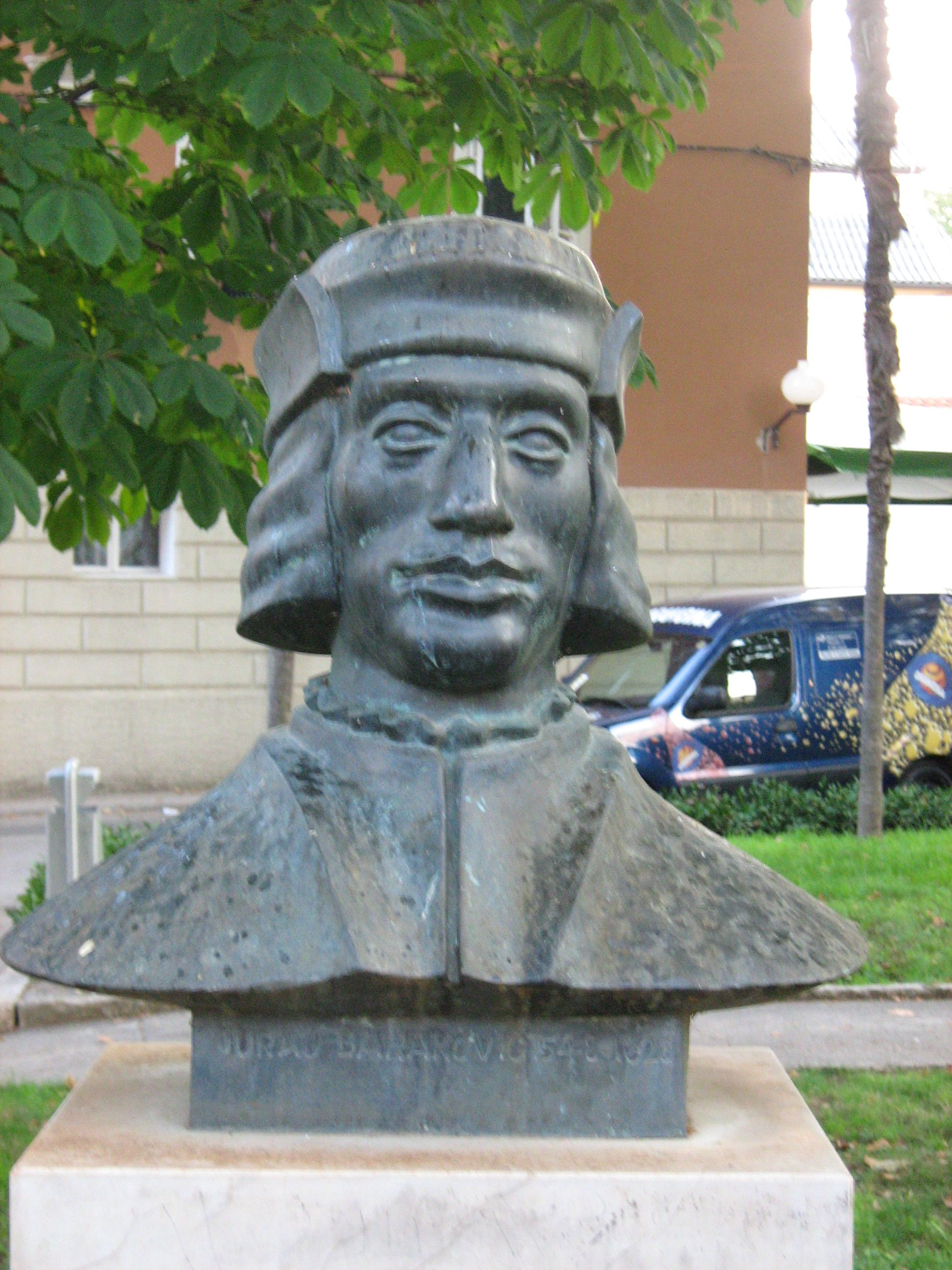
- A statue of Baraković in Zadar
- Born: 1548; Plemići, Rtina, Zadar, Venetian Republic
- Died: 1 August 1628 (aged 79–80); Rome, Papal States
- Occupation: poet
- Notable work: Vila slovinka (1613)

Juraj Baraković (Croatian pronunciation: [jûraj barǎːkoʋit͡ɕ]; 1548 – 1 August 1628) was a Croatian Renaissance poet from Zadar.

Baraković was born in the village of Plemići, Rtina. He wrote several distinguished pieces ("Jarula", Venice 1618 – Old and New Testament in storytelling form; "Draga, rapska pastirica"), but one work excels in his literary opus: complicated and the most explicitly manneristic epic in 13 books "Vila slovinka" (Venice, 1613).

Most of Baraković's poetry was dedicated to the glory of Zadar, with firm reliance on his co-citizen Petar Zoranić that already left a notable mark on Croatian literature. Vila slovinka, an epic written in the glory of Zadar, has two especially notable features: in the eighth book the eleven octosyllabic sonnets are listed, which are, beside a few anonymously written ones in Ranjina's Miscellany, the only sonnets in Croatian poetry before the Illyrian movement. The same book contains perfectly stylised bugarščica about Mother Margarita, which astonishes both readers and philologists for centuries, still leaving to be determined whether is it a folk song that Baraković incorporated into his own work following the model of Petar Hektorović, or is it his own song adapted to the stylistic features of the folk poem stanzas, or the folk song enhanced by Baraković's skillful poetical and artistic genius.

Baraković died in Rome, the city he visited three times in his life.

== Sources ==
- "BARAKOVIĆ, Juraj". Croatian Biographical Lexicon (in Croatian). Miroslav Krleža Institute of Lexicography.
