= Rtina =

- Village
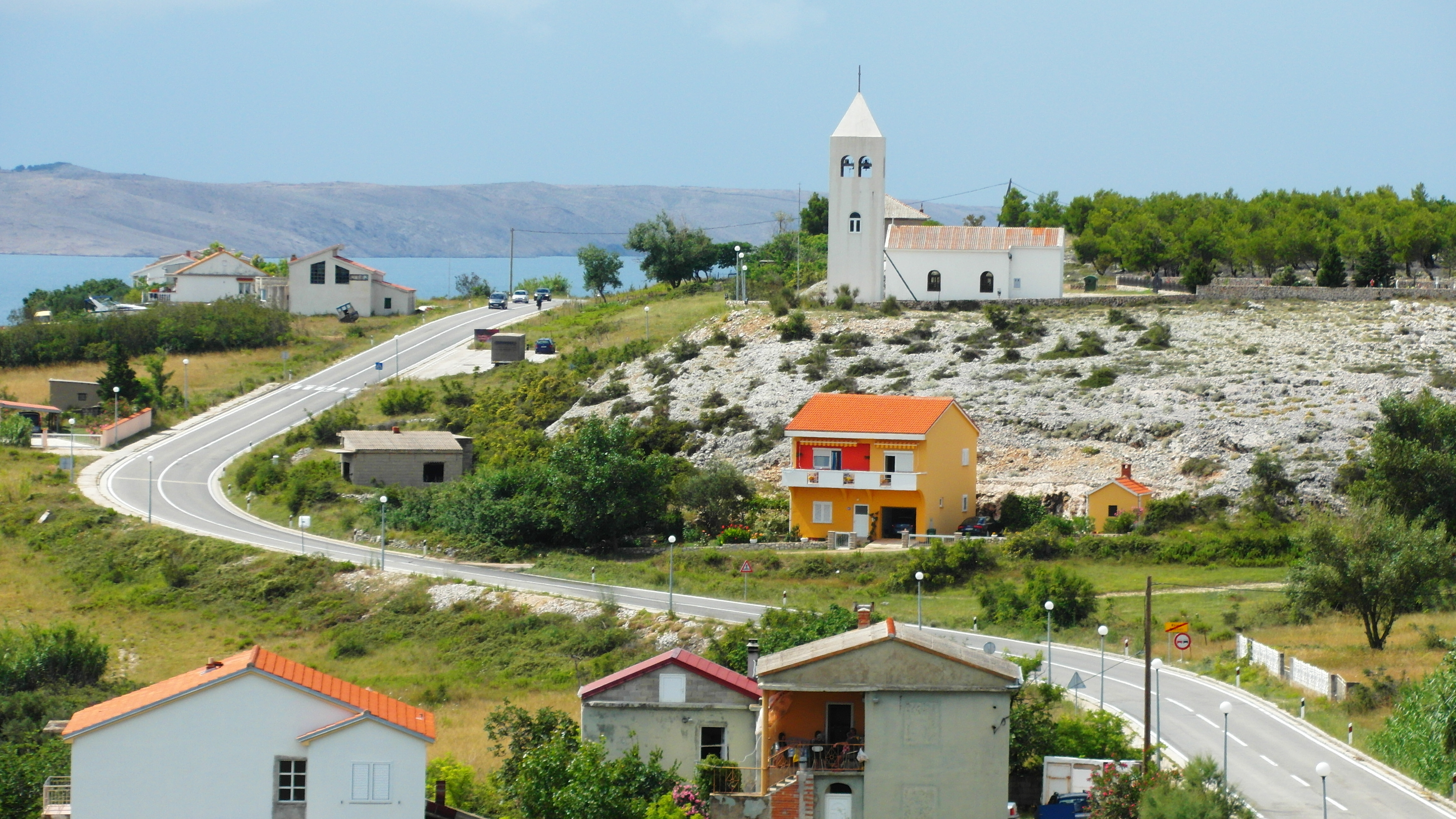
- Rtina

- Location of Rtina in Croatia
- Coordinates: 44°18′14″N 15°17′16″E
- Country: Croatia
- County: Zadar County

Area
  - Total: 16.5 km^{2} (6.4 sq mi)

Population (2021)
  - Total: 443
  - Density: 26.8/km^{2} (69.5/sq mi)

Rtina is a village in northern Dalmatia, Croatia. The population is 452 (census 2011). Rtina belongs to Zadar County, and is located about 13 km from the Motorway No. 1, Zagreb – Split.

Rtina lies on a small promontory whose northeastern side is located opposite to the Mountain of Velebit, separated from it with the southern part of the Velebit Channel (Croatian: Velebitski kanal). It is connected by the Pag Bridge with the island of Pag at its northwestern tip. It lies about 5 km northwest from Ražanac, and about 2 km north of templar fortification Ljuba, or Liuba (now Ljubljana).

Rtina Miočići is located on a large point about 43 m high above sea level. That point represents the northernmost part of the Dalmatian coast.

== History ==
Written documents originate from the time of a poet, Juraj Baraković, who mentioned that his grandfather, for his bravery in the battle with Tatar sin Lika, was awarded by the Croato-Hungarian King Bela and got three villages: Plemići, Brus i Oštri Rat (now Rtina). From 1890 until 1921 the village Rtina had the name Hrtina. Close at the bridge to Pag are the remains of the once Medieval Templar Fort in the vicinity of Fortica. At Rtina there is a church dedicated to St. Simon Bogoprimac, erected in the 19th century but destroyed during communist regime 1962. The church was rebuilt again and dedicated on 24 June 1990, after the liberation of Croatia.

== Hamlets ==
The hamlets belonging to Rtina are Miočići, Miletići, Benići, Vrankovići, Stošiċi, Liliċi, Tabari, Begani and Šašulji. If visitors are seeking excitement, they can take a cycling tour or just go for a walk, and stop at the top hill and watch the scenery of hills (Ljubljana, Gradina, Glavica Jovića). Near Rtina Miočići at the Rt (Cape) Ljubljana is templar fort Castrum Ljubiae.

== Sights ==
The following national parks are within the range of 50 km from Rtina Miočići: Paklenica Gorge in the Velebit range, Kornati Archipelago, and the Krka National Park with its beautiful waterfalls. The Plitvice Lakes National Park is about an hour and a half away by car. The canyon of the Zrmanja river, known for its rafting opportunities, is also quite close.

== Notable people ==
- Juraj Baraković, Renaissance poet
- Stipe Miočić, UFC Heavyweight Champion
