= Venezia Giulia Police Force =

Allied organization in the Julian March (1945–1961)

Venezia Giulia Police Force was a police corps formed after World War II by the Allied Military Government in Zone A of Venezia Giulia. Operating in the Free Territory of Trieste after 1947, it was active until 1961. From 1945 to 1954 it was directed by Col. Gerald Richardson, a former Scotland Yard officer.

== Background ==
The Yugoslav 4th Army and the Slovenian 9th Corps entered Trieste on May 1, 1945. The 2nd Division (New Zealand) arrived on the next day and forced the surrender of the 2,000 German Army troops holding out in Trieste, who warily had refused to capitulate to partisan troops, fearing they would be executed by them. An uneasy truce developed between New Zealand and Yugoslav troops. On June 12, 1945, the Yugoslav forces were driven out by the British Army; American and British took over the administration of the Territory, creating the Allied Military Government on the western part of the Julian March or Venezia-Giulia. On June 30, 1945 the AMG of Venetia-Giulia with an executive order signed by, US Army Colonel Nelson W. Monfort, dissolved all the existing police forces in the City of Trieste and other parts of Venezia Giulia, including the Popular Defense Corps or Difesa Popolare, created by the Yugoslavs during their forty-day occupation of the city, from May 1 to June 12, 1945. The allied Forces then had to create a new Civil Police Force to maintain law and order in the territory, and to work alongside their Military Police Forces, to deal with the local civilian matters. The newly created Corps was named Venezia-Giulia Police Force (V.G.P.F); Civil Police was an unconventional name given to the Force, to distinguish them from the Military Police Forces, British and US, which were also operating in the Venezia Giulia, A zone, at the end of WW2. They were also known with the moniker "Cerini" or "Wax Matches", because of the uniform they worn. In fact the contrast between the huge white helmet and the dark blue British Uniform, reminded to the population, the shape of a Wax Match.

== Organization ==
The Venezia Giulia Police Force was created in September 1945, after the training school opened in August 1945 had trained and graduated men who had passed a medical test and had their political records scrutinized. It was organized into 7 divisions: Administrative and Personnel, Uniformed Police Criminal Investigation, Transportation, Training, Quartermaster (supply) and Prison Service. Divisions had subdivisions or sections, covering every branch of service:

- Division 1: Administrative, Personnel, Finance, Medical, and Press Office;
- Division 2: Uniformed Police, Mounted Section, Forest, Female Police service created in 1947;
- Division 3: Cabinet, License, Criminal Investigation Department;
- Division 4:Transport, Communication, and Traffic;
- Division 5: Quartermaster, Procurement Office;
- Division 6:Training and Police Band;
- Division 7: Divisional Headquarter including the Coroneo Jail, The Jesuits and Tigor Street Jails. The last two were in use until 1952.

Training Facilities and Police School Academy as well as police band, with 60 members, were located at the Beleno Barracks, in Trieste in Street Pasquale Revoltella number 29-35. In addition there were Fishery Patrol, Motor Boat Patrol, Railway Police Service and Female Police. Although Fishery Police was part of the V.G.P.F., they did not share the same civilian status; they were military, and wore different uniforms. Fishery Police were given the tasks that nowadays are commonly carried out by the Coast Guard, such as Territorial Waters and Fishing boats protection. The Fishery Police Patrol, who was also in charge of the Port area security, and was established in August 1945 after few British officers had entered gun-in-hand into the Trieste Port Authority Offices, who were still held by the Yugoslavs, kicking them literally out. The Female section of the V.G.P.F. was created in 1947, and it was real innovation compared to the old Italian concept of policing. Their tasks were more or less those assigned to the other units, including investigating vice crimes and prostitution. The V.G.P.F. had also a Female Section, which was a forerunner for the future introduction of women into the Italian Police Forces. Female Officers were issued the same uniforms of their male colleagues, but they were not allowed to carry firearms during night shifts.

The newly formed Police Force also had a chaplain Service, and a trade union. The Roman Catholic Mons. Mario Novach served as corps chaplain from 1948 until its dissolution in 1961, as most of the Corps member were Roman Catholic and Willy Marcocci was the union secretary.

Transport service, or truck pool, whose trucks were provided by the military authorities, also included the communication and Road Police Unit. The communication section was in charge of all type of communications, radio, teletype and telephones, including the management of the emergency number phone number, 223. The radio center was located into the Local Government House in Piazza/Square Unita' d'Italia. Road Police Unit was responsible for patrolling the roads. In addition to their general road policing duties, they assisted with various operations aimed at improving road safety by promoting campaign for the Road-safety aimed to reduce the rate of road collision in Trieste, and were also in charge to draft reports in case of vehicle collisions. The Civil Police were equipped with Morris cars.

The Police Force had its own gazette, Il Eco della Polizia ("The Echo of the Police") whose last issue was on October 25, 1954. The newspaper ha d its typography located in Via dell 'Istria n.54 in Trieste the present seat of the Provincial Carabineers HQ of Trieste.

The V.G.P.F was also involved in the recovering of the corpses from the Foibes, deep karst sinkhole, and the V.G.P.F Criminal Investigation Division was in charge of the investigation. The "Corpse Recovering Squad" was part of the forensic section and was led by the Inspectors Umberto De Giorgi and Oronzo Rizzo. The long report drafted by Inspector De Giorgi, pertaining the operation of the corpses recovering from foibes, is available online, in Italian language. During the November 1951 Polesine flooding, when two thirds of the Polesine Italian geographical region was flooded, the V.G.P.F organized a relief party commanded by Superintendent May, a former Metropolitan Police Superintendent, with more than 150 men equipped with: 11 heavy trucks, 10 motorcycle, 11 jeeps, a mobile radio station, 5 light trucks, a water supply truck, an ambulance and a searching-light truck.

== Commissioner ==
The Police Commissioner was the British Army Colonel CMG, OBE, Gerald Richardson. A Scotland yard Officer, from Nottingham, he had his first experience as Police Officer, when himself and other members of a local rowing club decided to volunteer, for the Special Constabulary in Nottingham, when a general strike broke out. The strike lasted 9 days, from May 3, 1926 to May 13, 1926. At the end of the strike, he had realized that Law enforcement would have been his future career. He applied for the London Metropolitan Police where, after having passing the tests, he was admitted in 1927, and entered in the Police Training School at the Peel House in Westminster. After the graduation he spent 12 months on the beat, and then requested the assignment to the Criminal Investigation department; in August 1929 he was appointed Detective Constable. On July 13, 1943 he was Commissioned into the British Army. He would spend the rest of the war as law enforcement officer in the territories occupied by the British Forces. From London he was initially sent to Tangier, and after the landing in Italy he was in Sicily and Naples where for 18 months, he was Chief Public Safety Officer. At the end of the war he was serving in Northern Italy. It was during a period of rest on Lake Maggiore, that an urgent telephone call summoned him, to report immediately, to the 8th Army HQ, where he received a new assignment as Director of the Public Safety of the City of Trieste. His task was not an easy one since there was no existing police force in the city. Among the reasons which had made the allied to take the direct rule of the area was that of, avoiding future confrontation between Italy and Yugoslavia who were still struggling for the possession of the border regions and the Port of Trieste. The port was a strategic hub to supply the allied forces in the occupied Austria. Colonel Gerald Richardson, has been described as a worthy gentleman always well dressed, and with the typical English trait. He tried to infuse the esprit de corps, and to create a cohesion into the newly formed unit. When creating the V.G.P.F, He abolished disciplinary code in use in the Royal Carabineer Corps, judging it too harsh and vicious, encouraged the development of, the new force traditions, personal responsibilities, and the concept of impartiality. Police Force personnel welfare was one of his priorities; he made sure that they all received an adequate salary, appropriate lodging, family allowances, and sickness benefits. However, when a regrettable incident occurred at a village outside Trieste, where a political demonstration had later developed into a riot, was taking place, and three demonstrators were shot dead, three Police Officers and an Inspector were charged with manslaughter, and had to appear before an Allied Military Court presided by British and American judges. As soon as he took up office, one of his first decision was to disband the Difesa Popolare, or Popular Defense, the uniformed People's Police Force the Communists had built up. He soon noticed that, they were keeping no-record of what they were doing as well as for the arrestees, and when asked about it, were not able to produce any record at all; that their prisons were full, and most of the times, the interviewed prisoners could not give an account regarding their arrest. In addition all the evidences he collected, suggested that the Difesa Popolare, was financing itself with a protection racket system and looting. The uniform they wore were done by a local clothing manufacturer who had been doing the same job for the Germans. They wore red stars, and red scarfs around the neck and their chest were trimmed with hand grenades. Col. Gerald Richardson also find out that, their courts had no professional judges and that at the best, the trials were presided by some zealous young Law student, which in most of the cases, had forgotten everything he had studied. All these facts were intolerable for him and for the Allied authorities, and therefore two weeks after he took office the Difesa Popolare was officially disbanded. When they asked for a Victory parade, to be held on Sunday morning, their request was granted. The Difesa Popolare marched thru the street of Trieste, for the last time, and reached the Rossetti barracks. When the last one of them had filed into the barracks, the heavy doors were dragged shut behind them. From the opening windows, and roof British troops covered them with rifles, and machine guns; they had to surrender their own arms. They were told that they could go everywhere they liked, women as well as men. Those who wanted to go to Yugoslavia had to form a line on the left, assuming that the others on the right would have stayed, and were escorted to the frontier. British Personnel quickly went to the Difesa Popolare Posts and seized their weapon. However some of them were also given the chance of joining the V.G.P.F., although Richardson's preference was for the former Royal Carabineers and Questura personnel whom he judged a better training material. His office was located at Foro Ulpiano, inside the Trieste Court House, and also included the Deputy Chief of Police, the Legal Advisor and Disciplinary Officer. In March 1955, Col. Richardson became the Commissaire, Chef de la Sureté, Police Générale, in the International zone of Tangier.On May 27 th,1949 the President of the United States, conferred to Col. (temp) Gerald Richardson O.B.E. (282757)The Medal of Freedom with Bronze Palm.

== Jurisdiction ==
The Morgan Line ceased to exist on September 15, 1947, when the Treaty of Peace with Italy came into effect. The Treaty established the border between Italy and Yugoslavia in the northern sections of the contended territory, as well as the border between Yugoslavia and the Free Territory of Trieste established as new independent, sovereign State under a provisional regime of Government and under the direct responsibility of the United Nations Security Council in its southern part. The Jurisdiction of the Free Territory of Trieste, after Gorizia and Pola zones had been returned to Italy and ceded Yugoslavia respectively, was divided into 5 Zones: City of Trieste, Duino, Opicina, Muggia and Port and Railway. Zones were divided into Districts open 24/7, and Border Posts. Every zone was patrolled on foot and with Emergency car. A system of public emergency calls was started, and the emergency number 223, was available, to request help or assistance by the local population.

== Uniforms and weapons ==
The V.G.P.F personnel was initially issued a mixture of British, American and Italian equipment and weaponry. The 13th British Army Corps insignia, an Antelope, was adopted as the Corps Insignia. However parade and Police Uniform were under a great British influx, resulting in an undeniable, London Metropolitan Police style. Military training was according to that of the British Army, as well as the drill instruction. The British Army's salute, with the right hand palm facing forwards with the fingers almost touching the cap or beret, was adopted. The corps was equipped with Winchester Carbine mod. 1 and 2, Automatic Colt Pistol cal. 45, Smyth and Wesson revolvers. Commissioned Officers and sergeants were issued Italian Beretta Pistol model 1934. Only night time shifts carried firearms, while during the day no weapons was carried by the personnel on duty. The V.G.P.F identification cards were all bilingual.

== Ranks ==
Senior Commissioned Officers had a rank tier as follow: Superintendent Assistant, Superintendent and Chief Superintendent. These positions were exclusively held by British and American personnel. Junior Ranks from Deputy Superintendent (Major), Chief Inspector (Captain), Inspector (1st LT), Deputy Inspector (2nd LT), Sergeants (Warrant Officers) of first, second and third class, Corporal and Guard, were open to locals.

== Strength ==
The Venezia-Giulia Police Force in October 1945 had an initial strength of 2,482 commissioned officers and enlisted. At its peak, in 1949, had a strength of 6,097 men and women, decreasing to 4,296 in 1952, and in 1954, when the provisional civil administration of zone A of the FTT was eventually handed over to Italy had a total 4,366 men and women. The V.G.P.F. personnel was created following the Venezia-Giulia ethnic criteria enlisting Italians, Slovenians and Croats. In addition a small group of former German and Austrian POWs were also allow to enlist.

== The Trieste riots ==
On November 3, 1953, on the anniversary of the first annexation of Trieste to Italy in 1918, which is also the feast commemorating the patron saint of Trieste, Saint Giusto, the city mayor, Giovanni Bartoli, ignoring a ban of Maj. Gen. Sir Thomas John Willoughby Winterton, displayed the Italian National flag on the city hall. As he hoisted the flag, some British officers quickly removed and confiscated the flag. The day after, some local citizens, coming back from the celebration held at the Redipuglia Italian World War I memorial, improvised a demonstration in support of the Italian rule of the city. The V.G.P.F. was activated to suppress the unauthorized demonstration, and confiscate the flags waved by the demonstrators. This provoked heavy fights which soon spread out throughout the city. On November 5, 1953, the students called a strike and started a demonstration in Sant'Antonio Square, in front of the local church. As a civil police car passed by, the students stoned the vehicle. A British member of the V.G.P.F., Mr. Edwards, got off the car and confronted the demonstrators, was greeted with a hail of stones, insulted and beaten. The V.G.P.F. Riot squad arrived on the spot, to support the superintendent of C.I.D, Villanti and his men, who had witnessed the scene of Mr. Edwards stoning and went to rescue him. The crowd was soon dispersed with truncheons and with the help of a water truck. Some of the students who had found refuge in the church were chased and seriously beaten. During the afternoon the city bishop Mons Antonio Santin decided to re-consecrate the church, according to the Roman Catholic tradition, as violent acts have been committed inside. Thousands of citizens rallied up for the rite, and as the police cars showed up the trouble soon began. Apparently a British officer member of the V.G.P.F, fired warning shots, as well as some police officers did. As a result, two persons, Piero Addobbati and Antonio Zavadil, were killed and several were injured. On November 6, 1953 a large crowd marched towards the government house on Piazza/Square, Unità d'Italia were the AMG had its seat. In the meantime cars and other police facilities in the city were destroyed and burned. The police cordoning the government house opened fire, killing Francesco Paglia, Leonardo Manzi, Saverio Montano and Erminio Bassa. In the three days of rioting, six persons were killed and 162 injured, including 79 policemen. In his memories, Col. Richardson gave this account of the shooting at Piazza Unità d'Italia, in front of the government house, "... Mr Williams was told to go to Piazza Unità d'Italia at the Government house, with a Riot Squad. When there he ordered his men to remain into the vehicles. He went, alone, to remonstrate with the crowd, and in Italian, he appealed to them, but his attempt was unsuccessful. As he went back to his men, several stone struck him, and at that point, since the situation was quickly deteriorating, he gave orders to his men, to unsling carbines and prepare to face the crowd. He led a charge against the mob, meanwhile the Police was under a heavy stone volley. After he had run ahead few yards, he heard shots being fired behind him, but he had given no order to fire.. He immediately turned back and shouted in Italian "Enough, enough! Stop firing!!!" The victims of the riots were: Francesco Paglia (Trieste, 1929), student at the local University, and former bersagliere of the Repubblica Sociale Italiana; Leonardo "Nardino" Manzi (Fiume now Rijeka, 1938), student, a Fiume refugee; Saverio Montano (Bari, 1903), former partisan; Erminio Bassa (Trieste, 1902), Dockworker; Antonio Zavadil (Trieste, 1889), Dockworker; Pietro Addobbati (Zara now Zadar, 1938), student, a Dalmatian region refugee.

=== Aftermath ===
Clement Attlee, at the time leader of the opposition, (by Private Notice) asked the Secretary of State for Foreign Affairs, Sir Anthony Eden, whether he could make any statement regarding the disturbances in Trieste. Police reports indicated that disorders were deliberately provoked and at least partly organized from outside Zone A, by people defined as "Irresponsible elements" who had evidently planned to exploit certain national Italian anniversaries in order to provoke incidents in Trieste. The demonstrations seemed to be aimed at causing a breakdown of law and order and the disruption of the local security forces. Italian sources however labeled the action as a, deliberate repression put into being by the Anglo-American Allied Military Government Authorities, to suppress the Italian sentiment of the local population, and obstruct the process of reunion of Trieste with the motherland. Her Majesty's Government took a grave view of these events, and sincerely deplored the loss of life, the injuries suffered and the destruction of property in Trieste. However, the sole responsibility for these tragic results was given to those extremist elements who deliberately provoked and organized these disorders. In note exchanging the British government made its views quite clear to the Italian Government and urged that they should do all in their power to curb those elements who have been responsible for provoking the disturbances in Trieste and the subsequent anti-allied demonstrations in Italy.

== Assignment of provisional civil Administration of Trieste to Italy ==
Approximately at 10:00 hrs of October 26, 1954 the Venezia-Giulia Police Force Commissioner, Col. Gerald Richardson, handed over responsibilities to Lt. Col. Diamante the acting Chief Public Safety Officer nominated by the Italian authorities. The V.G.P.F. was placed under the authority of the Italian State Police Force, at the time a paramilitary branch of the Italian Security Forces, and renamed, "Gruppo Polizia Civile" or "Civil Police Group", retaining its uniforms and ranks. This was an unusual status, because the V.G. Police Force was conceived as a Civil Police Force, while Italy had a long tradition, still enduring, of National Police Forces with a Military Status. Deputy Supervisor, Santo Del Piccolo was appointed as Commanding Officer of the "Civil Police Group". The Force, continued to operate as semi-distinct branch of Service of the Italian State Police Force, until law number 1600 was passed on December 22, 1960. The law came into effect on July 18, 1961, definitively dissolving the V.G. Police Force. Its personnel was given the choice to join the Italian State Police Force, acquiring a Military status, join the City of Trieste Municipal Force, or entering into the state administration. Some of the V.G.P.F. Personnel, mostly those with English skills, took the chance offered by the Allied, to emigrate under a special program, in USA, Canada, Australia or United Kingdom.
