= Ljubač, Dubrovnik-Neretva County =

Ljubač
- Village
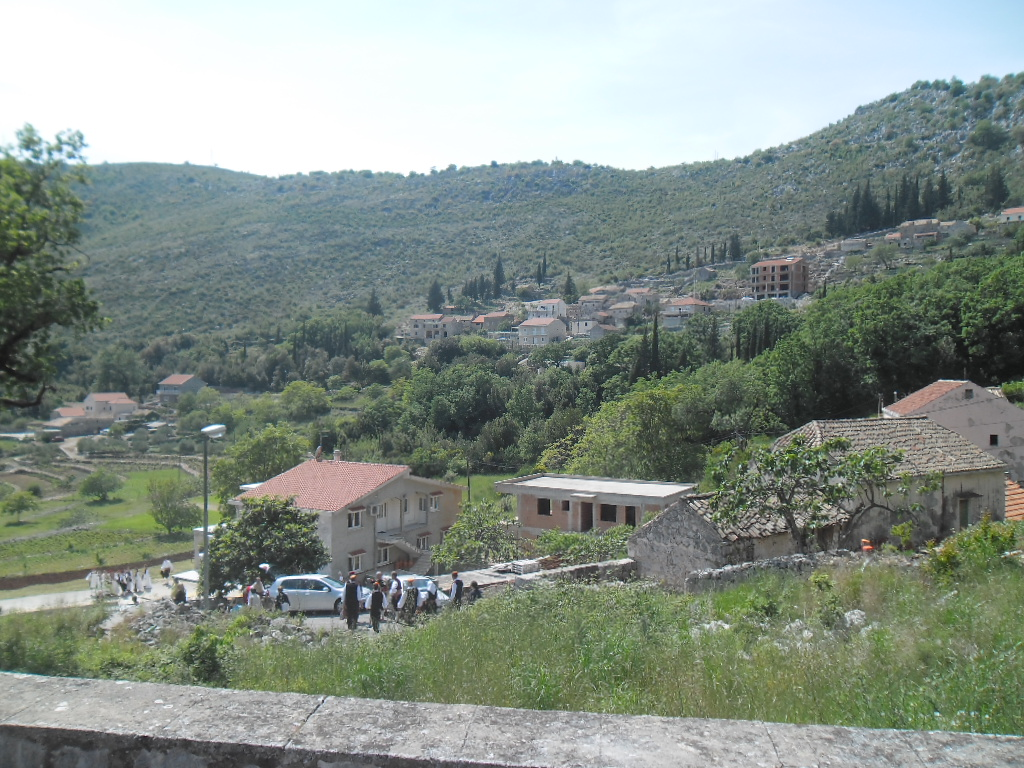

- Location within Croatia
- Coordinates: 42.7163479°N 18.0086688°E
- Country: Croatia
- County: Dubrovnik-Neretva County
- Municipality: Dubrovnik

Area
  - Total: 1.4 sq mi (3.6 km^{2})

Population (2021)
  - Total: 73
  - Density: 53/sq mi (20/km^{2})
- Time zone: UTC+1 (CET)
  - Summer (DST): UTC+2 (CEST)

Ljubač is a village in Croatia.

== Demographics ==
According to the 2021 census, its population was 73.
