= Ljubač, Zadar County =

Ljubač
- Location within Croatia
- Coordinates: 44°15′38″N 15°17′44″E
- Country: Croatia
- County: Zadar
- Municipality: Ražanac

Area
  - Total: 7.6 km^{2} (2.9 sq mi)

Population (2021)
  - Total: 402
  - Density: 53/km^{2} (140/sq mi)
- Time zone: UTC+1 (CET)
  - Summer (DST): UTC+2 (CEST)

Ljubač is a small Croatian village located north of Zadar. It is part of the municipality of Ražanac and the population is 475 as of the 2011 census. Ljubač is located 15 kilometres north of Zadar, with a view of Velebit and Pag.
