= List of HNK Rijeka records and statistics =

HNK Rijeka are a Croatian professional association football club based in Rijeka, Croatia who compete in the Croatian First Football League. The club was formed in July 1946 as NK Kvarner, and played its first unofficial match on 7 August 1946 against Hajduk Split, winning 2–0. Rinaldo Petronio scored the first goal for the club. The first official game was played in the qualifiers for the 1946–47 Yugoslav First League against Unione Sportiva Operaia (Pula), losing 2–1 in Rijeka. Kvarner later won the return leg 4–1 in Pula and qualified for the Yugoslav championship. This article lists various records and statistics related to the club and individual players and managers.

All records and statistics accurate as of 23 May 2026.

== Individual records and statistics ==
Current players and manager are in bold/italics.

=== Appearances ===
- Most appearances:
  - All fixtures
    - **684**, (Socialist Federal Republic of Yugoslavia) Srećko Juričić (1974–85)
  - Official matches
    - **351**, (Socialist Federal Republic of Yugoslavia) Srećko Juričić (1974–85)
  - In Yugoslav First League
    - **293**, (Socialist Federal Republic of Yugoslavia) Srećko Juričić (1974–85)
  - In Croatian First Football League
    - **196**, (Croatia) Kristijan Čaval (1998–2005, 2010–13)
    - **196**, (Croatia) Damir Milinović (1994–2001, 2003–04)
  - In Yugoslav Cup
    - **25**, (Socialist Federal Republic of Yugoslavia) Srećko Juričić (1975–85)
  - In Croatian Cup
    - **34**, (Croatia) Dragan Tadić (1992–95, 2003–07)
  - In UEFA competitions
    - **38**, (Bosnia and Herzegovina) Zoran Kvržić (2013–15, 2017–20)
    - **38**, (Croatia) Ivan Tomečak (2013–15, 2019–21)
- Most appearances in one season:
  - All official matches
    - **53**, (Bosnia and Herzegovina) Martin Zlomislić (2025–26)
  - In Yugoslav First League
    - **35**, (Socialist Federal Republic of Yugoslavia) Tonči Gabrić (1990–91)
    - **35**, (Socialist Federal Republic of Yugoslavia) Dušan Kljajić (1990–91)
    - **35**, (Socialist Federal Republic of Yugoslavia) Fabijan Komljenović (1990–91)
  - In Croatian First Football League
    - **36**, (Croatia) Andrej Prskalo (2016–17)
    - **36**, (Croatia) Marin Tomasov (2015–16)
    - **36**, (Croatia) Nediljko Labrović (2022–23)
  - In Yugoslav Cup
    - **8**, (Socialist Federal Republic of Yugoslavia) Janko Janković (1986–87)
    - **8**, (Socialist Federal Republic of Yugoslavia) Igor Jelavić (1986–87)
    - **8**, (Socialist Federal Republic of Yugoslavia) Roberto Paliska (1986–87)
    - **8**, (Socialist Federal Republic of Yugoslavia) Davor Radmanović (1986–87)
    - **8**, (Socialist Federal Republic of Yugoslavia) Borče Sredojević (1986–87)
  - In Croatian Cup
    - **10**, (Croatia) Elvis Brajković (1993–94)
  - In UEFA competitions
    - **16**, (Portugal) Tiago Dantas (2025–26)
    - **16**, (Bosnia and Herzegovina) Martin Zlomislić (2025–26)
- Appearances in most seasons:
  - In top flight
    - **12**, (Socialist Federal Republic of Yugoslavia) (Croatia) Robert Rubčić
  - In UEFA competitions
    - **6**, (Bosnia and Herzegovina) Zoran Kvržić
    - **6**, (Croatia) Ivan Tomečak

==== Other records in the Croatian First Football League ====
- Youngest player
  - **16 years, 148 days**, (Croatia) Viktor Vešligaj (23 May 2026 v Gorica)
- Oldest player
  - **35 years, 344 days**, (Croatia) Mladen Romić (3 May 1998 v Mladost 127)
- Oldest débutante
  - **34 years, 290 days**, (Bosnia and Herzegovina) Elvir Bolić (30 July 2006 v Cibalia)
- Most minutes played
  - **17,045 minutes**, (Croatia) Damir Milinović (1994–2001, 2003–04)
- Most minutes played (one season)
  - **3,240 minutes**, (Croatia) Nediljko Labrović (2022–23)
  - **3,240 minutes**, (Croatia) Andrej Prskalo (2016–17)
- Most consecutive appearances
  - **68**, (Croatia) Đoni Tafra (1998–2000)
- Most substituted player
  - **56**, (Croatia) Anas Sharbini (2005–09, 2013–15)
- Most substituted player (one season)
  - **20**, (Switzerland) Mario Gavranović (2016–17)
- Most used substitute
  - **61**, (Croatia) Jasmin Samardžić (1992–97, 2003–04)
- Most used substitute (one season)
  - **24**, (Croatia) Dario Čanađija (2016–17)
- Appearances in most seasons
  - **10**, (Croatia) Kristijan Čaval (1998–2005, 2010–13)

==== Other records in the Yugoslav First League ====
- Most used substitute
  - **44**, (Socialist Federal Republic of Yugoslavia) Valdi Šumberac (1986–91)
- Most used substitute (one season)
  - **14**, (Socialist Federal Republic of Yugoslavia) Feriz Ćelović (1982–83)
- Appearances in most seasons
  - **11**, (Socialist Federal Republic of Yugoslavia) Damir Desnica (1974–85)

=== Most appearances ===
As of 14 May 2016 (includes only Yugoslav First League and Croatian First Football League matches):

| | Name | Period | Games |
|---|---|---|---|
| 1 | (Socialist Federal Republic of Yugoslavia) Srećko Juričić | 1974–85 | 293 |
| 2 | (Socialist Federal Republic of Yugoslavia) Damir Desnica | 1972–84 | 251 |
| 3 | (Socialist Federal Republic of Yugoslavia) Zvjezdan Radin | 1974–85 | 247 |
| 4 | (Socialist Federal Republic of Yugoslavia) Josip Mohorović | 1968–76 | 232 |
| 4 | (Socialist Federal Republic of Yugoslavia) Miloš Hrstić | 1975–84 | 230 |
| 5 | (Socialist Federal Republic of Yugoslavia) Vladimir Lukarić | 1958–69; 1971–72 | 202 |
| 6 | (Croatia) Kristijan Čaval | 1998–05; 2010–13 | 196 |
| = | (Croatia) Damir Milinović | 1994–2000; 2001; 2003–04 | 196 |
| 8 | (Socialist Federal Republic of Yugoslavia) Marijan Jantoljak | 1960–71 | 190 |
| 9 | (Socialist Federal Republic of Yugoslavia) Mauro Ravnić | 1978–88 | 186 |
| 10 | (Socialist Federal Republic of Yugoslavia) (Croatia) Robert Rubčić | 1982–84; 1985–94; 1995–96 | 184 |
| 11 | (Socialist Federal Republic of Yugoslavia) (Croatia) Mladen Romić | 1988–94; 1995–98 | 180 |
| 12 | (Socialist Federal Republic of Yugoslavia) Milan Ružić | 1976–83 | 176 |
| = | (Croatia) Đoni Tafra | 1996–03 | 176 |
| 14 | (Socialist Federal Republic of Yugoslavia) Anđelo Milevoj | 1963–70 | 174 |
| 15 | (Croatia) Roberto Paliska | 1984–91; 1994–96 | 172 |
| 16 | (Socialist Federal Republic of Yugoslavia) Sergio Machin | 1970–82 | 166 |
| 17 | (Socialist Federal Republic of Yugoslavia) Adriano Fegic | 1977–85 | 161 |
| 18 | (Croatia) Dragan Tadić | 1992–95; 2003–07 | 158 |
| = | (Socialist Federal Republic of Yugoslavia) Mladen Vranković | 1960–68 | 158 |
| 20 | (Socialist Federal Republic of Yugoslavia) (Croatia) Mladen Mladenović | 1981–89; 1993–94; 1997–98 | 156 |
| = | (Croatia) Dalibor Višković | 1995–02 | 156 |
| 22 | (Socialist Federal Republic of Yugoslavia) Velimir Naumović | 1956–65 | 155 |
| 23 | (Socialist Federal Republic of Yugoslavia) Nikica Milenković | 1978–87 | 154 |
| 24 | (Croatia) Mladen Ivančić | 1993–99; 2001–03 | 153 |
| 25 | (Croatia) Dario Knežević | 2002–06; 2012–15 | 148 |
| 26 | (Bosnia and Herzegovina) Admir Hasančić | 1995–2000 | 147 |
| = | (Socialist Federal Republic of Yugoslavia) (Croatia) Daniel Šarić | 1990–93; 2003–07 | 147 |
| 28 | (Socialist Federal Republic of Yugoslavia) (Croatia) Nenad Gračan | 1980–86; 1995–96 | 146 |
| = | (Socialist Federal Republic of Yugoslavia) (Croatia) Mladen Žganjer | 1989–97 | 146 |
| 30 | (Socialist Federal Republic of Yugoslavia) Nedeljko Vukoje | 1961–69 | 143 |

=== Goals ===
- Most goals:
  - All league matches
    - **89**, (Socialist Federal Republic of Yugoslavia) Boško Bursać (1964–72)
    - **84**, (Socialist Federal Republic of Yugoslavia) Bruno Veselica (1954–64)
    - **78**, (Socialist Federal Republic of Yugoslavia) Stojan Osojnak (1948–53, 1955–59)
  - All official matches (since 1974–75)
    - **70** in 148 apps, (Croatia) Ahmad Sharbini (2003–07, 2008–09)
    - **63** in 284 apps, (Socialist Federal Republic of Yugoslavia) Damir Desnica (1974–85)
    - **60** in 143 apps, (Socialist Federal Republic of Yugoslavia) Milan Radović (1976–81)
    - **55** in 65 apps, (Croatia) Andrej Kramarić (2013–14)
  - In Yugoslav First League
    - **56** in 123 apps, (Socialist Federal Republic of Yugoslavia) Milan Radović (1976–81)
    - **54** in 251 apps, (Socialist Federal Republic of Yugoslavia) Damir Desnica (1974–85)
    - **41** in 106 apps, (Socialist Federal Republic of Yugoslavia) Boško Bursać (1964–69)
  - In Yugoslav Second League and lower divisions
    - **78**, (Socialist Federal Republic of Yugoslavia) Stojan Osojnak (1948–53, 1955–59)
    - **48**, (Socialist Federal Republic of Yugoslavia) Boško Bursać (1969–72)
    - **46**, (Socialist Federal Republic of Yugoslavia) Bruno Veselica (1954–58)
  - In Croatian First Football League
    - **54** in 117 apps, (Croatia) Ahmad Sharbini (2003–07, 2008–09)
    - **46** in 147 apps, (Bosnia and Herzegovina) Admir Hasančić (1994–2000)
    - **39** in 137 apps, (Croatia) Anas Sharbini (2005–09, 2013–15)
  - In Yugoslav Cup
    - **5** in 11 apps, (Socialist Federal Republic of Yugoslavia) Janko Janković (1985–88)
    - **5** in 12 apps, (Socialist Federal Republic of Yugoslavia) Vladimir Lukarić (1958–69)
    - **5** in 21 apps, (Socialist Federal Republic of Yugoslavia) Damir Desnica (1977–84)
    - **4** in 8 apps, (Socialist Federal Republic of Yugoslavia) Ivan Medle (1958–62)
    - **4** in 13 apps, (Socialist Federal Republic of Yugoslavia) Nenad Gračan (1980–86)
    - **4** in 15 apps, (Socialist Federal Republic of Yugoslavia) Danko Matrljan (1982–87)
  - In Croatian Cup
    - **14** in 24 apps, (Croatia) Ahmad Sharbini (2003–07, 2008–09)
    - **11** in 9 apps, (Croatia) Antonio Čolak (2018–20)
    - **10** in 6 apps, (Croatia) Andrej Kramarić (2013–14)
    - **9** in 9 apps, (Switzerland) Mario Gavranović (2016–17)
    - **9** in 28 apps, (Croatia) Siniša Linić (2002–07)
  - In UEFA competitions
    - **8** in 16 apps, (Croatia) Andrej Kramarić (2013–14)
    - **7** in 38 apps, (Bosnia and Herzegovina) Zoran Kvržić (2013–15, 2017–20)
    - **6** in 11 apps, (Croatia) Leon Benko (2013)
    - **6** in 12 apps, (Switzerland) Mario Gavranović (2016–17)
    - **6** in 27 apps, (Croatia) Toni Fruk (2023–26)
  - In Adriatic derby
    - **8**, (Croatia) Toni Fruk
  - In Dinamo–Rijeka derby
    - **7**, (Socialist Federal Republic of Yugoslavia) Damir Desnica
  - In Rijeka–Pula derby
    - **9**, (Croatia) Antonio Čolak
- Most goals in one season:
  - All official matches
    - **28** in 31 apps, (Croatia) Andrej Kramarić (2014–15)
    - **27** in 34 apps, (Croatia) Andrej Kramarić (2013–14)
    - **26** in 32 apps, (Socialist Federal Republic of Yugoslavia) Milan Radović (1980–81)
    - **26** in 42 apps, (Croatia) Tomislav Erceg (2004–05)
  - In Yugoslav First League
    - **26** in 31 apps, (Socialist Federal Republic of Yugoslavia) Milan Radović (1980–81)
    - **19** in 33 apps, (Socialist Federal Republic of Yugoslavia) Janko Janković (1986–87)
    - **17** in 27 apps, (Socialist Federal Republic of Yugoslavia) Miodrag Kustudić (1977–78)
    - **17** in 29 apps, (Socialist Federal Republic of Yugoslavia) Miodrag Kustudić (1976–77)
  - In Yugoslav Second League
    - **21**, (Socialist Federal Republic of Yugoslavia) Stojan Osojnak (1950)
    - **21**, (Socialist Federal Republic of Yugoslavia) Boško Bursać (1970–71)
  - In Croatian First Football League
    - **21** in 18 apps, (Croatia) Andrej Kramarić (2014–15)
    - **21** in 28 apps, (Croatia) Ahmad Sharbini (2006–07)
    - **21** in 30 apps, (Switzerland) Josip Drmić (2021–22)
    - **20** in 31 apps, (Croatia) Mladen Mladenović (1993–94)
    - **20** in 32 apps, (Croatia) Antonio Čolak (2019–20)
  - In Yugoslav Cup
    - **4** in 8 apps, (Socialist Federal Republic of Yugoslavia) Janko Janković (1986–87)
  - In Croatian Cup
    - **10** in 6 apps, (Croatia) Andrej Kramarić (2013–14)
    - **7** in 5 apps, (Croatia) Antonio Čolak (2018–19)
    - **7** in 5 apps, (Switzerland) Mario Gavranović (2016–17)
    - **7** in 8 apps, (Croatia) Tomislav Erceg (2004–05)
    - **7** in 8 apps, (Croatia) Siniša Linić (2005–06)
  - In UEFA competitions
    - **7** in 12 apps, (Croatia) Andrej Kramarić (2014–15)
    - **6** in 10 apps, (Switzerland) Mario Gavranović (2017–18)
    - **6** in 11 apps, (Croatia) Leon Benko (2013–14)
- Most goals in one match:
  - In top flight
    - **5**, (Croatia) Andrej Kramarić (9 November 2014 v Lokomotiva)
    - **4**, (Croatia) Jakov Puljić (13 April 2019 v Inter Zaprešić)
  - In domestic cup
    - **8**, (Croatia) Andrej Kramarić (9 October 2013 v Zmaj Blato)
  - In UEFA competitions
    - **3**, (Socialist Federal Republic of Yugoslavia) Damir Desnica (7 November 1979 v (Czech Republic) Lokomotíva Košice)
    - **3**, (Croatia) Leon Benko (18 July 2013 v (Wales) Prestatyn Town)
    - **3**, (North Macedonia) Adis Jahović (7 August 2014 v (Faroe Islands) Víkingur)
    - **3**, (Croatia) Andrej Kramarić (23 October 2014 v (Netherlands) Feyenoord)
    - **3**, (Croatia) Franjo Ivanović (3 August 2023 v (Kosovo) Dukagjini)
  - In Adriatic derby
    - **3**, (Croatia) Davor Vugrinec (22 April 2006)
    - **3**, (Croatia) Andrej Kramarić (27 July 2014)
    - **3**, (Croatia) Toni Fruk (22 November 2025)
  - In Dinamo–Rijeka derby
    - **3**, (Socialist Federal Republic of Yugoslavia) Tonči Gulin (7 March 1965)
  - In Rijeka–Pula derby
    - **4**, (Croatia) Antonio Čolak (25 July 2020)

==== Other goalscoring records in Croatian First Football League ====
- Youngest goalscorer
  - **17 years, 61 days**, (Croatia) Dario Smoje (19 November 1995 v Varteks)
- Oldest goalscorer
  - **34 years, 296 days**, (Bosnia and Herzegovina) Elvir Bolić (5 August 2006 v Kamen Ingrad)
- Scored in most consecutive matches
  - **6**, (Croatia) Leon Benko (2012–13)
  - **5**, (Croatia) Andrej Kramarić (2013–14)
  - **5**, (Croatia) Ivan Krstanović (2013–14)
  - **5**, (Brazil) Héber Araujo dos Santos (2017–18)
- Scored in most seasons
  - **8**, (Croatia) Kristijan Čaval (1999–2005, 2010–12)
  - **8**, (Croatia) Damir Milinović (1994–2002, 2003–04)
- Most goals scored as a substitute
  - **11**, (Croatia) Ahmad Sharbini (2003–07)
- Most goals scored as a substitute (one season)
  - **7**, (Croatia) Ahmad Sharbini (2006–07)
- Most goals scored on début
  - **2**, (Australia) Ante Milicic (2 October 1999 v Istra)
- Most goals scored against a single opposition
  - **9**, (Croatia) Antonio Čolak (v Istra 1961)
  - **9**, (Croatia) Ahmad Sharbini (v Osijek)
  - **9**, (Croatia) Ahmad Sharbini (v Varteks)
- Fastest goals
  - **17 seconds**, (Switzerland) Mario Gavranović (18 September 2016 v Dinamo Zagreb)
  - **20 seconds**, (Croatia) Anas Sharbini (15 December 2014 v NK Zagreb)
  - **24 seconds**, (Croatia) Sandro Klić (10 May 2003 v Šibenik)
  - **24 seconds**, (Croatia) Marin Leovac (10 August 2014 v RNK Split)
- Most braces
  - **10**, (Croatia) Ahmad Sharbini (including 4 hat-tricks)
- Most hat-tricks
  - **4**, (Croatia) Ahmad Sharbini
- Fastest hat-trick
  - **14 minutes**, (Australia) Ante Milicic (6 May 2001 v Hrvatski Dragovoljac)
- Fastest four goals
  - **28 minutes**, (Croatia) Andrej Kramarić (9 November 2014 v Lokomotiva)
- Fastest five goals
  - **41 minutes**, (Croatia) Andrej Kramarić (9 November 2014 v Lokomotiva)
- Most converted penalties
  - **9**, (Croatia) Ivan Krstanović (from 9 attempts)
  - **9**, (Croatia) Damir Kreilach (from 10 attempts)
  - **7**, (Croatia) Robert Murić (from 8 attempts)
  - **7**, (Montenegro) Radomir Đalović (from 10 attempts)
- Most missed penalties
  - **3**, (Montenegro) Radomir Đalović (from 10 attempts)
  - **2**, (Switzerland) Mario Gavranović (from 2 attempts)
  - **2**, (Croatia) Marko Pjaca (from 4 attempts)
  - **2**, (Croatia) Jakov Puljić (from 4 attempts)
  - **2**, (Croatia) Anas Sharbini (from 6 attempts)
  - **2**, (Croatia) Franko Andrijašević (from 7 attempts)
- Most own goals
  - **2**, (Croatia) Nino Galović
  - **2**, (Croatia) Dario Knežević
- Most appearances without scoring (outfield players only)
  - **148**, (Croatia) Dario Knežević (2002–06, 2012–15)
- Goals scored by most players in an individual season
  - **23** players in 2014–15

==== Other goalscoring records in Yugoslav First League ====
- Youngest goalscorer (since 1974–75)
  - **18 years, 107 days**, (Socialist Federal Republic of Yugoslavia) Elvis Scoria (22 October 1989 v Spartak Subotica)
- Oldest goalscorer (since 1974–75)
  - **34 years, 266 days**, (Socialist Federal Republic of Yugoslavia) Josip Skoblar (7 December 1975 v Željezničar)
- Scored in most consecutive matches
  - **5**, (Socialist Federal Republic of Yugoslavia) Bruno Veselica (1963–64)
  - **5**, (Socialist Federal Republic of Yugoslavia) Milan Radović (1980–81)
  - **4**, (Socialist Federal Republic of Yugoslavia) Predrag Valenčić (1984–85)
- Scored in most seasons
  - **9**, (Socialist Federal Republic of Yugoslavia) Damir Desnica (1975–76, 1977–85)
  - **9**, (Socialist Federal Republic of Yugoslavia) Vladimir Lukarić (1958–66, 1967–68)
- Fastest goal
  - **under 10 seconds**, (Socialist Federal Republic of Yugoslavia) Petar Radaković (29 November 1959 v Sloboda)
- Most braces
  - **11**, (Socialist Federal Republic of Yugoslavia) Milan Radović (including 2 hat-tricks)
- Most hat-tricks
  - **2**, (Socialist Federal Republic of Yugoslavia) Tonči Gulin
  - **2**, (Socialist Federal Republic of Yugoslavia) Milan Radović
- Most appearances without scoring (outfield players only)
  - **174**, (Socialist Federal Republic of Yugoslavia) Anđelo Milevoj (1963–69)

==== Other goalscoring records in UEFA competitions ====
- Youngest goalscorer
  - **19 years, 306 days**, (Croatia) Franjo Ivanović (3 August 2023 v (Kosovo) Dukagjini)
- Oldest goalscorer
  - **32 years, 304 days**, (Croatia) Tomislav Erceg (26 August 2004 v (Turkey) Gençlerbirliği)
- Scored in most seasons
  - **4**, (Bosnia and Herzegovina) Zoran Kvržić (2013–16, 2017–18)
- Most converted penalties
  - **4**, (Croatia) Andrej Kramarić (from 4 attempts)
- Fastest hat-trick
  - **12 minutes and 27 seconds**, (Croatia) Andrej Kramarić (23 October 2014 v (Netherlands) Feyenoord); second fastest hat-trick in the UEFA Europa League

==== Landmarks ====
- First goal:
  - In official matches: (Socialist Federal Republic of Yugoslavia) **Antonio Nori** (12 August 1946 v (Socialist Federal Republic of Yugoslavia) Unione Sportiva Operaia).
  - In Yugoslav First League: (Socialist Federal Republic of Yugoslavia) **Alcide Flaibani** (16 October 1946 v 14. Oktobar Niš).
  - In Croatian First Football League: (Croatia) **Zoran Ban** (29 February 1992 v Šibenik).
  - In Yugoslav Cup: (Socialist Federal Republic of Yugoslavia) **Uskoković** (2 November 1947 v Jedinstvo Čakovec).
  - In Croatian Cup: (Croatia) **Davor Černe** (7 April 1992 v Hajduk Split).
  - In UEFA competitions: (Socialist Federal Republic of Yugoslavia) **Edmond Tomić** (13 September 1978 v (Wales) Wrexham).
  - At Kantrida: (Socialist Federal Republic of Yugoslavia) **Jozo Matošić** (17 November 1946 v Budućnost).
  - At Rujevica: (Croatia) **Marin Leovac** (2 August 2015 v Lokomotiva).
- First brace:
  - In Yugoslav First League: (Socialist Federal Republic of Yugoslavia) **Antonio Nori** (27 October 1946 v Crvena Lokomotiva).
  - In Croatian First Football League: (Croatia) **Dean Ljubančić** (2 May 1992 v Istra; scored 3 goals in total).
  - In Croatian Cup: (Croatia) **Damir Knežević** (14 August 1993 v Budućnost Hodošan).
- First hat-trick:
  - In Yugoslav First League: (Socialist Federal Republic of Yugoslavia) **Ivan Medle** (2 April 1961 v Radnički Beograd).
  - In Croatian First Football League: (Croatia) **Dean Ljubančić** (2 May 1992 v Istra).
  - In Croatian Cup: (Croatia) **Siniša Linić** (15 November 2005 v Vinogradar; scored 5 goals in total).
  - In UEFA competitions: (Socialist Federal Republic of Yugoslavia) **Damir Desnica** (7 November 1979 v (Czech Republic) Lokomotíva Košice).
- Last goal:
  - In Yugoslav First League: (Socialist Federal Republic of Yugoslavia) **Matjaž Florijančič** (16 June 1991 v Partizan).
  - In Yugoslav Cup: (Socialist Federal Republic of Yugoslavia) **Fabijan Komljenović** (21 November 1990 v Hajduk Split).
  - At Kantrida: (Slovenia) **Roman Bezjak** (19 July 2015 v Slaven Belupo).
- 100th goal:
  - In UEFA competitions: (Austria) **Alexander Gorgon** (23 November 2017 v (Greece) AEK Athens)
- 1,000th goal:
  - In Yugoslav First League: (Socialist Federal Republic of Yugoslavia) **Mladen Mladenović** (2 November 1988 v Velež).
  - In Croatian First Football League: (Croatia) **Ivan Krstanović** (10 May 2014 v Lokomotiva).
- 2,000th goal:
  - In top flight: (Croatia) **Leon Benko** (17 February 2013 v Dinamo Zagreb).

=== Top goalscorers ===
As of 23 May 2026 (includes only Yugoslav First League and Croatian First Football League matches):

| | Name | Period | Goals |
|---|---|---|---|
| 1 | (Socialist Federal Republic of Yugoslavia) Milan Radović | 1976–81 | 56 |
| 2 | (Croatia) Ahmad Sharbini | 2003–07; 2008–09 | 54 |
| = | (Socialist Federal Republic of Yugoslavia) Damir Desnica | 1974–85 | 54 |
| 4 | (Bosnia and Herzegovina) Admir Hasančić | 1994–01 | 46 |
| 5 | (Socialist Federal Republic of Yugoslavia) (Croatia) Mladen Mladenović | 1981–89; 1993–94; 1998 | 43 |
| 6 | (Socialist Federal Republic of Yugoslavia) Boško Bursać | 1964–72 | 41 |
| 7 | (Socialist Federal Republic of Yugoslavia) Vladimir Lukarić | 1958–69; 1971–72 | 40 |
| 8 | (Socialist Federal Republic of Yugoslavia) Miodrag Kustudić | 1974–78; 1982–83 | 39 |
| = | (Croatia) Anas Sharbini | 2005–10; 2013–15 | 39 |
| 10 | (Croatia) Antonio Čolak | 2018–20 | 38 |
| = | (Socialist Federal Republic of Yugoslavia) Bruno Veselica | 1954–64 | 38 |
| 12 | (Socialist Federal Republic of Yugoslavia) Janko Janković | 1985–88 | 37 |
| = | (Croatia) Andrej Kramarić | 2013–14 | 37 |
| 14 | (Socialist Federal Republic of Yugoslavia) Adriano Fegic | 1977–85 | 36 |
| 15 | (Socialist Federal Republic of Yugoslavia) Edmond Tomić | 1978–84 | 35 |
| 16 | (Croatia) Franko Andrijašević | 2016–17; 2019–21 | 34 |
| = | (Croatia) Leon Benko | 2012–14 | 34 |
| = | (Austria) Alexander Gorgon | 2016–20 | 34 |
| 19 | (Montenegro) Radomir Đalović | 2007–08; 2009–11 | 33 |
| 20 | (Socialist Federal Republic of Yugoslavia) (Croatia) Nenad Gračan | 1980–86; 1995–96 | 32 |
| = | (Socialist Federal Republic of Yugoslavia) Nedeljko Vukoje | 1961–70 | 32 |
| 22 | (Bosnia and Herzegovina) Senad Brkić | 1994–98 | 31 |
| 23 | (Socialist Federal Republic of Yugoslavia) Tonči Gulin | 1963–67 | 30 |
| 24 | (Croatia) Robert Murić | 2019–22 | 28 |
| 25 | (Switzerland) Josip Drmić | 2021–22 | 27 |
| 26 | (Croatia) Toni Fruk | 2023– | 26 |
| 27 | (Switzerland) Mario Gavranović | 2016–17 | 25 |
| = | (Brazil) Héber Araujo dos Santos | 2017–19 | 25 |
| = | (Socialist Federal Republic of Yugoslavia) Danko Matrljan | 1982–88 | 25 |
| = | (Socialist Federal Republic of Yugoslavia) Nebojša Malbaša | 1981–86 | 25 |
| 31 | (Slovenia) Roman Bezjak | 2015–16; 2017 | 24 |
| = | (Croatia) Jakov Puljić | 2017–20 | 24 |
| 33 | (Croatia) Sandro Klić | 1999–2004 | 23 |
| 34 | (Socialist Federal Republic of Yugoslavia) Ivan Medle | 1958–63 | 22 |
| = | (Croatia) Natko Rački | 2001–03 | 22 |
| 36 | (Croatia) Boško Balaban | 1996–2000 | 21 |
| = | (Croatia) Niko Janković | 2023– | 21 |
| 38 | (Croatia) Damir Kreilach | 2008–13 | 19 |
| = | (Socialist Federal Republic of Yugoslavia) Velimir Naumović | 1956–65 | 19 |
| = | (Socialist Federal Republic of Yugoslavia) Andrija Perčić | 1964–69 | 19 |
| = | (Hungary) Barnabás Sztipánovics | 1998–2000 | 19 |
| = | (Socialist Federal Republic of Yugoslavia) (Croatia) Zoran Škerjanc | 1982–88; 1992 | 19 |

=== Assists ===
Data is for the Croatian First Football League (since 2007–08).

- Most assists
  - **38**, (Croatia) Anas Sharbini
- Most assists (one season)
  - **16**, (Croatia) Toni Fruk (2023–24)
  - **12**, (Croatia) Anas Sharbini (2014–15)
  - **12**, (Croatia) Marin Tomasov (2015–16)
  - **11**, (Croatia) Toni Fruk (2024–25)
  - **11**, (Bosnia and Herzegovina) Zoran Kvržić (2018–19)
  - **10**, (Croatia) Josip Brezovec (2012–13)
  - **10**, (Croatia) Robert Murić (2021–22)
  - **10**, (Croatia) Domagoj Pavičić (2017–18)
  - **10**, (Croatia) Jakov Puljić (2018–19)
  - **9**, (North Macedonia) Stefan Ristovski (2016–17)
  - **9**, (Croatia) Anas Sharbini (2013–14)
  - **9**, (Montenegro) Marko Vešović (2016–17)

=== Goalkeeping ===
- Most appearances:
  - In Yugoslav First League
    - **190**, (Socialist Federal Republic of Yugoslavia) Marijan Jantoljak
    - **186**, (Socialist Federal Republic of Yugoslavia) Mauro Ravnić
    - **119**, (Socialist Federal Republic of Yugoslavia) Radojko Avramović
  - In Croatian First Football League
    - **176**, (Croatia) Đoni Tafra
    - **143**, (Croatia) Mladen Žganjer
    - **95**, (Croatia) Ivan Vargić
  - In Yugoslav Cup
    - **14**, (Socialist Federal Republic of Yugoslavia) Radojko Avramović
    - **14**, (Socialist Federal Republic of Yugoslavia) Mauro Ravnić
  - In Croatian Cup
    - **27**, (Croatia) Mladen Žganjer
    - **18**, (Bosnia and Herzegovina) Martin Zlomislić
    - **15**, (Serbia) Dragan Žilić
  - In UEFA competitions
    - **23**, (Croatia) Ivan Vargić
    - **22**, (Bosnia and Herzegovina) Martin Zlomislić
    - **14**, (Croatia) Andrej Prskalo
- Longest run without conceding a goal:
  - In Yugoslav First League
    - **506 minutes**, (Socialist Federal Republic of Yugoslavia) Borut Škulj (1975–76)
    - **445 minutes**, (Socialist Federal Republic of Yugoslavia) Tonči Gabrić (1989–90)
  - In Croatian First Football League
    - **783 minutes**, (Croatia) Ivan Vargić (2015–16)
    - **666 minutes**, (Croatia) Nediljko Labrović (2023–24) (**1,101 minutes** if a goal conceded from the penalty kick is excluded)
    - **622 minutes**, (Croatia) Mladen Žganjer (1993–94)
    - **565 minutes**, (Croatia) Ivan Vargić (2015–16) (**699 minutes** if a goal conceded from the penalty kick is excluded)
    - **514 minutes**, (Croatia) Andrej Prskalo (2016–17)
  - Overall record
    - **917 minutes**, (Socialist Federal Republic of Yugoslavia) Marijan Jantoljak (1969–70, when the club played in Yugoslav Second League)
- Most clean sheets:
  - In Croatian First Football League
    - **58** in 143 apps, (Croatia) Mladen Žganjer
    - **55** in 176 apps, (Croatia) Đoni Tafra
    - **45** in 95 apps, (Croatia) Ivan Vargić
- Most clean sheets in one season:
  - In Yugoslav First League
    - **18** in 35 apps, (Socialist Federal Republic of Yugoslavia) Tonči Gabrić (1990–91)
  - In Croatian First Football League
    - **21** in 32 apps, (Croatia) Ivan Vargić (2015–16)
    - **21** in 36 apps, (Croatia) Andrej Prskalo (2016–17)
- Most saved penalties:
  - In Croatian First Football League
    - **3**, (Croatia) Nediljko Labrović
    - **3**, (Croatia) Ivan Vargić
- Most goals scored:
  - In Yugoslav First League
    - **9**, (Socialist Federal Republic of Yugoslavia) Marijan Jantoljak (1959–69)

=== Disciplinary ===
- Most yellow cards:
  - In Croatian First Football League
    - **52**, (Croatia) Dalibor Višković
  - In Croatian First Football League (one season)
    - **14**, (Croatia) Dalibor Višković (1998–99)
  - In Croatian Cup
    - **7**, (Croatia) Daniel Šarić
- Most red cards:
  - In Croatian First Football League
    - **5**, (Croatia) Igor Čagalj
  - In Croatian First Football League (one season)
    - **3**, (Croatia) Igor Čagalj (2007–08)
    - **3**, (Croatia) Siniša Linić (2006–07)
    - **3**, (Croatia) Dubravko Pavličić (1993–94)
  - In Croatian Cup
    - **2**, (Croatia) Marin Leovac
- Most appearances without a card:
  - In Croatian First Football League
    - **42**, (Bosnia and Herzegovina) Sead Seferović
  - In Croatian Cup
    - **27**, (Croatia) Mladen Žganjer
- Most appearances without a red card:
  - In Croatian First Football League
    - **178**, (Croatia) Dragan Tadić

=== International ===
- First capped player for (Socialist Federal Republic of Yugoslavia) Yugoslavia
  - **Vladimir Lukarić** and **Petar Radaković** (Belgrade, 18 June 1961: Yugoslavia 3–2 Morocco)
- First capped player for Croatia
  - **Tonči Gabrić** (Zagreb, 17 October 1990: Croatia 2–1 USA)
- First Rijeka player to appear at the FIFA World Cup for (Socialist Federal Republic of Yugoslavia) Yugoslavia
  - (Socialist Federal Republic of Yugoslavia) **Petar Radaković** at the 1962 FIFA World Cup
- First Rijeka player to appear at the FIFA World Cup for Croatia
  - (Croatia) **Filip Bradarić** at the 2018 FIFA World Cup
- First Rijeka player to score a goal at the FIFA World Cup
  - (Socialist Federal Republic of Yugoslavia) **Petar Radaković** at the 1962 FIFA World Cup (Santiago, 10 June 1962: Yugoslavia 1–0 West Germany)
- First Rijeka player to appear at the UEFA European Championship
  - (Albania) **Odise Roshi** at the 2016 UEFA Euro
- Most caps with (Socialist Federal Republic of Yugoslavia) Yugoslavia while a Rijeka player
  - **19**, Petar Radaković (1961–64)
  - **10**, Miloš Hrstić (1978–82)
  - **10**, Nenad Gračan (1984–86)
- Most goals with (Socialist Federal Republic of Yugoslavia) Yugoslavia while Rijeka player
  - **3**, Petar Radaković (1961–64)
  - **2**, Nenad Gračan (1984–86)
- Most caps with Croatia while Rijeka player
  - **7**, Dubravko Pavličić (1992–94)
- Most goals with Croatia while Rijeka player
  - **2**, Andrej Kramarić (2014)
  - **2**, Mladen Mladenović (1994)
  - **2**, Anas Sharbini (2014–15)
- Most caps with other national teams while Rijeka player
  - **30**, (North Macedonia) Darko Velkovski (2019–22)
- Most goals with other national teams while Rijeka player
  - **7**, (Montenegro) Radomir Đalović (2007–08; 2009–11)
- Most capped players to play for Rijeka
  - **114**, (Croatia) Andrej Kramarić
  - **82**, (North Macedonia) Stefan Ristovski
  - **71**, (Albania) Odise Roshi
  - **68**, (Lithuania) Justas Lasickas
  - **55**, (North Macedonia) Darko Velkovski
  - **54**, (Montenegro) Marko Vešović
  - **51**, (Bosnia and Herzegovina) Elvir Bolić
  - **49**, (Slovenia) Adam Gnezda Čerin
  - **48**, (Albania) Bekim Balaj
  - **46**, (Slovenia) Nastja Čeh
  - **43**, (Bulgaria) Valeri Bojinov
  - **41**, (Switzerland) Mario Gavranović
  - **37**, (Germany) Fredi Bobic
  - **35**, (Croatia) Boško Balaban
  - **35**, (Switzerland) Josip Drmić
  - **35**, (Bosnia and Herzegovina) Amer Gojak
  - **34**, (Bulgaria) Georgi Ivanov
  - **33**, (Slovenia) Roman Bezjak
  - **33**, (Slovenia) Sebastjan Cimirotič
  - **32**, (Socialist Federal Republic of Yugoslavia) Josip Skoblar
  - **30**, (Croatia) Daniel Šarić

==== Homegrown players with most appearances in national team ====
| # | Name | Career | Apps |
|---|---|---|---|
| 1 | (Croatia) Boško Balaban | 2000–07 | 35 |
| 2 | (Croatia) Daniel Šarić | 1997–2002 | 30 |
| 3 | (Croatia) Mario Tokić | 1998–2006 | 28 |
| 4 | (Croatia) Mladen Mladenović | 1990–96 | 19 |
| 4 | (Socialist Federal Republic of Yugoslavia) Petar Radaković | 1961–64 | 19 |
| 6 | (Croatia) Jasmin Agić | 1999–2004 | 14 |
| 7 | (Croatia) Dario Knežević | 2006–09 | 13 |
| 8 | (Socialist Federal Republic of Yugoslavia) Marijan Brnčić | 1962–67 | 10 |
| 8 | (Socialist Federal Republic of Yugoslavia) Nenad Gračan | 1984–86 | 10 |
| 8 | (Socialist Federal Republic of Yugoslavia) Miloš Hrstić | 1979–82 | 10 |
| 11 | (Croatia) Elvis Brajković | 1994–96 | 8 |
| 12 | (Croatia) Igor Budan | 2007–08 | 6 |
| 12 | (Socialist Federal Republic of Yugoslavia) Vladimir Lukarić | 1961–65 | 6 |
| 12 | (Socialist Federal Republic of Yugoslavia) Mauro Ravnić | 1986–87 | 6 |

==== Participation in major international tournaments by Rijeka players ====
===== FIFA World Cup =====
- (Chile) 1962 FIFA World Cup **4th place**
  - (Socialist Federal Republic of Yugoslavia) Petar Radaković
- (Spain) 1982 FIFA World Cup **16th place**
  - (Socialist Federal Republic of Yugoslavia) Miloš Hrstić
  - (Socialist Federal Republic of Yugoslavia) Ive Jerolimov
- (Russia) 2018 FIFA World Cup **Silver**
  - (Croatia) Filip Bradarić
- (United States) (Canada) (Mexico) 2026 FIFA World Cup
  - (Bosnia and Herzegovina) Stjepan Radeljić
  - (Bosnia and Herzegovina) Martin Zlomislić
  - (Croatia) Toni Fruk

===== UEFA Euro =====
- (France) UEFA Euro 2016 **9th place**
  - (Croatia) Ivan Vargić
- (France) UEFA Euro 2016 **18th place**
  - (Albania) Bekim Balaj
  - (Albania) Odise Roshi
- (European Union) UEFA Euro 2020 **23rd place**
  - (North Macedonia) Milan Ristovski
  - (North Macedonia) Darko Velkovski
- (Germany) UEFA Euro 2024 **20th place**
  - (Croatia) Nediljko Labrović
  - (Croatia) Marco Pašalić
  - (Croatia) Marko Pjaca

=== Managerial ===
- Most appearances for a manager:
  - All official matches
    - **274**, (Slovenia) Matjaž Kek
    - **161**, (Socialist Federal Republic of Yugoslavia) (Croatia) Josip Skoblar
    - **147**, (Croatia) Nenad Gračan
  - In Yugoslav First League
    - **131**, (Socialist Federal Republic of Yugoslavia) Stojan Osojnak
    - **125**, (Socialist Federal Republic of Yugoslavia) Josip Skoblar
    - **89**, (Socialist Federal Republic of Yugoslavia) Dragutin Spasojević
  - In Croatian First Football League
    - **201**, (Slovenia) Matjaž Kek
    - **131**, (Croatia) Nenad Gračan
    - **85**, (Croatia) Elvis Scoria
  - In Croatian Cup
    - **30**, (Slovenia) Matjaž Kek
    - **13**, (Croatia) Elvis Scoria
    - **10**, (Croatia) Nenad Gračan
  - In UEFA competitions
    - **42**, (Slovenia) Matjaž Kek
    - **10**, (Spain) Víctor Sánchez
    - **9**, (Montenegro) Radomir Đalović
- Most wins for a manager:
  - All official matches
    - **164**, (Slovenia) Matjaž Kek
    - **69**, (Croatia) Nenad Gračan
    - **59**, (Socialist Federal Republic of Yugoslavia) (Croatia) Josip Skoblar
  - In Yugoslav First League
    - **52**, (Socialist Federal Republic of Yugoslavia) Stojan Osojnak
    - **50**, (Socialist Federal Republic of Yugoslavia) Josip Skoblar
    - **30**, (Socialist Federal Republic of Yugoslavia) Dragutin Spasojević
    - **30**, (Socialist Federal Republic of Yugoslavia) Mladen Vranković
  - In Croatian First Football League
    - **122**, (Slovenia) Matjaž Kek
    - **62**, (Croatia) Nenad Gračan
    - **31**, (Croatia) Elvis Scoria
  - In Croatian Cup
    - **25**, (Slovenia) Matjaž Kek (Croatian Cup record)
    - **8**, (Croatia) Elvis Scoria
    - **7**, (Slovenia) Simon Rožman
  - In UEFA competitions
    - **16**, (Slovenia) Matjaž Kek
    - **4**, (Bosnia and Herzegovina) Sergej Jakirović
    - **4**, (Spain) Víctor Sánchez
- Youngest manager in Croatian First Football League
  - **33 years, 19 days**, (Croatia) Elvis Scoria (24 July 2004 v Međimurje)
- Oldest manager in Croatian First Football League
  - **59 years, 102 days**, (Croatia) Vladimir Lukarić (3 May 1998 v Mladost 127)
- Longest-serving managers (per appointment)
  - **2,047 days**, (Slovenia) Matjaž Kek (27 February 2013 to 6 October 2018)
  - **1,334 days**, (Socialist Federal Republic of Yugoslavia) Stojan Osojnak (15 October 1963 to 10 June 1967)
  - **1,302 days**, (Socialist Federal Republic of Yugoslavia) Josip Skoblar (22 May 1983 to 14 December 1986)
- Longest-serving manager (all appointments)
  - **2,045 days**, (Slovenia) Matjaž Kek (27 February 2013 to 6 October 2018)

=== Awards ===
Yugoslav First League top goalscorers

| Season | Name | Goals |
|---|---|---|
| 1980–81 | (Socialist Federal Republic of Yugoslavia) Milan Radović | 26 |

Croatian First Football League top goalscorers

| Season | Name | Goals |
|---|---|---|
| 2004–05 | (Croatia) Tomislav Erceg | 17 |
| 2012–13 | (Croatia) Leon Benko | 18 |
| 2014–15 | (Croatia) Andrej Kramarić | 21 |
| 2019–20 | (Croatia) Antonio Čolak | 20 |

Croatian Football Cup top goalscorers

| Season | Name | Goals |
|---|---|---|
| 2004–05 | (Croatia) Tomislav Erceg | 7 |
| 2013–14 | (Croatia) Andrej Kramarić | 10 |
| 2015–16 | (Croatia) Marin Tomasov | 5 |
| 2016–17 | (Switzerland) Mario Gavranović | 7 |
| 2018–19 | (Croatia) Antonio Čolak | 7 |
| 2020–21 | (Bosnia and Herzegovina) Luka Menalo | 6 |

Most assists in the Croatian First Football League (since 2007–08)

| Season | Name | Assists |
|---|---|---|
| 2012–13 | (Croatia) Josip Brezovec | 10 |
| 2013–14 | (Croatia) Anas Sharbini | 9 |
| 2015–16 | (Croatia) Marin Tomasov | 12 |
| 2017–18 | (Croatia) Domagoj Pavičić | 10 |
| 2018–19 | (Bosnia and Herzegovina) Zoran Kvržić | 11 |
| 2021–22 | (Croatia) Robert Murić | 10 |
| 2023–24 | (Croatia) Toni Fruk | 16 |
| 2024–25 | (Croatia) Toni Fruk | 11 |

Sportske novosti Yellow Shirt award

- (Socialist Federal Republic of Yugoslavia) Nenad Gračan (1985–86)
- (Croatia) Mladen Mladenović (1993–94)
- (Croatia) Leon Benko (2012–13)
- (Croatia) Franko Andrijašević (2016–17)
- (Brazil) Héber Araujo dos Santos (2017–18)
- (Croatia) Antonio Čolak (2019–20)

Prva HNL Player of the Year (Tportal)

- (Croatia) Tomislav Erceg (2004)
- (Croatia) Leon Benko (2013)
- (Croatia) Andrej Kramarić (2014)
- (Croatia) Marin Tomasov (2015)
- (Croatia) Franko Andrijašević (2016)
- (Croatia) Toni Fruk (2025)

== Club records and statistics ==
As of 23 May 2026.

=== Competition appearances ===
- Yugoslav First League: **29** out of 45 (1946–47, 1958–69, 1974–91).
- Yugoslav Second League: **13** out of 45 (1947–48, 1950–53, 1955–58, 1969–74).
- Croatian First Football League: **35** out of 35 (1992–present). One of four clubs that have participated in all seasons, alongside Dinamo Zagreb, Hajduk Split and Osijek.
- Yugoslav Cup: **36** out of 43.
- Croatian Cup: **35** out of 35 (1992–present).
- UEFA competitions: **25** (1978–80, 1984–85, 1986–87, 1999–2001, 2002, 2004–07, 2008–10, 2013–present).

=== Final position ===
- Best position in Yugoslav First League: **4th**, 4 times (1964–65, 1965–66, 1983–84, 1986–87).
  - Best placed Croatian club: **3 times** (1964–65, 1983–84, 1986–87).
- Best position in Yugoslav Second League: **Winners**, 6 times (1952, 1957–58, 1969–70, 1970–71, 1971–72, 1973–74).
- Best position in Croatian First Football League: **Winners**, 2 times (2016–17, 2024–25).
- Best position in Yugoslav Cup: **Winners**, 2 times (1977–78, 1978–79).
- Best position in Croatian Cup: **Winners**, 7 times (2004–05, 2005–06, 2013–14, 2016–17, 2018–19, 2019–20, 2024–25).
- Worst position in Yugoslav First League: **17th** (1968–69).
- Worst position in Croatian First Football League: **12th** (2011–12).

=== League records and statistics ===
- In Croatian First Football League:
  - Matches played: 1159 (ranked **1st**).
  - Wins: 531 (ranked **3rd**).
  - Draws: 299 (ranked **1st**).
  - Defeats: 329 (ranked **3rd**).
  - Goals scored: 1745 (ranked **3rd**).
  - Goals conceded: 1274 (ranked **2nd**).
- In Yugoslav First League:
  - Matches played: 898 (ranked **12th**).
  - Wins: 310 (ranked **12th**).
  - Draws: 252 (ranked **11th**).
  - Defeats: 336 (ranked **10th**).
  - Goals scored: 1083 (ranked **11th**).
  - Goals conceded: 1163 (ranked **11th**).
  - Points: 857 (ranked **12th**).

=== Matches and scorelines ===
==== Firsts ====
- Official match
  - Kvarner 1–2 Unione Sportiva Operaia, 1946–47 Yugoslav First League qualifiers, 12 August 1946
- In Yugoslav First League
  - Kvarner 0–5 Crvena Lokomotiva, 1946–47, 6 October 1946
- In Yugoslav Cup
  - Kvarner 4–0 Jedinstvo Čakovec, 1947–48, 2 November 1947
- In Croatian First Football League
  - Rijeka 2–0 Šibenik, 1992, 29 February 1992
- In Croatian Cup
  - Rijeka 0–0 Hajduk Split, 1992, 24 March 1992
- In UEFA competitions
  - Rijeka 3–0 (Wales) Wrexham, 1978–79 European Cup Winners' Cup, 13 September 1978
- At Kantrida
  - Kvarner 2–2 Budućnost, 1946–47, 17 November 1946
- At Rujevica
  - Rijeka 3–1 Lokomotiva, 2015–16, 2 August 2015

==== Lasts ====
- In Yugoslav First League
  - Rijeka 3–0 Partizan, 1990–91, 16 June 1991
- In Yugoslav Cup
  - Hajduk Split 1–1 Rijeka, 1990–91, 21 November 1990
- At Kantrida
  - Rijeka 3–3 Slaven Belupo, 2015–16, 19 July 2015

==== Landmarks ====
- **1,000th** top flight match
  - Croatia Zagreb 3–0 Rijeka, 1994–95, 25 February 1995
- **2,000th** top flight match
  - Rijeka 1–0 Gorica, 2024–25, 30 November 2024
- **1,000th** match in the Croatian First Football League
  - Dinamo Zagreb 2–0 Rijeka, 2021–22, 30 January 2022
- **500th** win in the Croatian First Football League
  - Rijeka 4–0 Lokomotiva, 2024–25, 4 August 2024
- **1,000th** win in official matches
  - Rijeka 4–1 Zagreb, 2015–16, 4 October 2015
- **100th** match in UEFA competitions
  - Rijeka 6–1 (Kosovo) Dukagjini, 2023–24, 3 August 2023

==== Biggest wins ====
- Home:
  - In Yugoslav First League
    - **6–0** v. Novi Sad, 1963–64, 12 April 1964
  - In Croatian First Football League
    - **7–0** v. Zadar, 2002–03, 7 May 2003
    - **7–0** v. Cibalia, 2017–18, 9 September 2017
    - **7–0** v. Inter Zaprešić, 2018–19, 13 April 2019
  - In lower Yugoslav divisions
    - **10–0** v. 11 Oktomvri, 1950, 22 October 1950
  - In Yugoslav Cup
    - **5–0** v. Crvena Zastava Kragujevac, 1986–87, 27 August 1986
  - In Croatian Cup
    - **11–0** v. Zmaj Blato, 2013–14, 9 October 2013
  - In UEFA competitions
    - **5–0** v. (Wales) Prestatyn Town, 2013–14, 18 July 2013
    - **6–1** v. (Kosovo) Dukagjini, 2023–24, 3 August 2023
- Away:
  - In Yugoslav First League
    - **6–2** v. Trešnjevka, 1965–66, 19 June 1966
    - **5–1** v. Trešnjevka, 1964–65, 23 August 1964
    - **5–1** v. Sloboda, 1959–60, 29 November 1959
    - **5–1** v. Budućnost, 1982–83, 15 August 1982
    - **4–0** v. Velež, 1976–77, 5 June 1977
  - In Croatian First Football League
    - **7–0** v. Istra 1961, 2018–19, 4 May 2019
  - In lower Yugoslav divisions
    - **7–0** v. Grafičar Zagreb, 23 September 1956
    - **7–0** v. Metalac Zagreb, 27 October 1957
  - In Yugoslav Cup
    - **4–0** v. Viko-Omladinac, 1982–83, 26 October 1982
  - In Croatian Cup
    - **11–0** v. Buje, 2019–20, 1 October 2019
  - In UEFA competitions
    - **5–1** v. (Faroe Islands) Víkingur, 2014–15, 31 July 2014
    - **5–1** v. (Wales) The New Saints, 2017–18, 18 July 2017

==== Biggest defeats ====
- Home:
  - In Yugoslav First League
    - **0–6** v. Vojvodina, 1959–60, 6 September 1959
  - In Croatian First Football League
    - **2–7** v. Dinamo Zagreb, 2022–23, 13 November 2022
    - **0–5** v. Dinamo Zagreb, 2019–20, 10 November 2019
  - In lower Yugoslav divisions
    - **0–6** v. Zagreb, 1972–73, 5 November 1972
  - In Yugoslav Cup
    - **0–4** v. Mornar Split, 1947, 16 November 1947
  - In Croatian Cup
    - **0–2** v. Zagreb, 1995–96, 20 March 1996
    - **0–2** v. Orijent, 1997–98, 1 October 1997
    - **2–4** v. Varaždin, 2010–11, 21 November 2010
  - In UEFA competitions
    - **0–3** v. (Serbia and Montenegro) Partizan, 1999–2000, 4 August 1999
    - **0–3** v. (Scotland) Aberdeen, 2015–16, 16 July 2015
    - **1–4** v. Austria Wien, 2017–18, 2 November 2017
- Away:
  - In Yugoslav First League
    - **0–6** v. Dinamo Zagreb, 1958–59, 21 June 1959
  - In Croatian First Football League
    - **0–6** v. Dinamo Zagreb, 2009–10, 20 September 2009
    - **0–6** v. Segesta, 1995–96, 22 October 1995
  - In lower Yugoslav divisions
    - **0–6** v. Enotnost, 1947–48, 19 October 1947
    - **0–6** v. Proleter, 1952–53, 5 April 1953
    - **1–7** v. Maribor, 1972–73, 17 June 1973
  - In Yugoslav Cup
    - **1–8** v. Crvena Zvezda, 1952, 5 October 1952
  - In Croatian Cup
    - **0–5** v. Zagreb, 1995–96, 6 March 1996
  - In UEFA competitions
    - **0–5** v. (Slovenia) Olimpija Ljubljana, 2024–25, 29 August 2024
    - **0–5** v. (Greece) PAOK, 2025–26, 28 August 2025

==== Highest scoring draws ====
- In Yugoslav First League
  - Rijeka **3–3** Partizan (1958–59, 29 March 1959)
  - Rijeka **3–3** NK Zagreb (1977–78, 19 March 1978)
  - Rijeka **3–3** Osijek (1978–79, 25 March 1979)
  - Dinamo Zagreb **3–3** Rijeka (1983–84, 25 March 1984)
  - Rijeka **3–3** Velež (1985–86, 27 October 1985)
- In Croatian First Football League
  - Rijeka **4–4** Cibalia (1995–96, 27 August 1995)
  - Rijeka **4–4** Inter Zaprešić (1995–96, 15 October 1995)
  - Zadar **4–4** Rijeka (2011–12, 11 September 2011)
- In domestic cups
  - Hajduk Split **3–3** Rijeka (1993–94, 27 April 1994)
- In UEFA competitions
  - Rijeka **2–2** (Cyprus) Omonia (2006–07, 13 July 2006)
  - (Germany) Stuttgart **2–2** Rijeka (2013–14, 29 August 2013)
  - Rijeka **2–2** (Spain) Sevilla (2014–15, 2 October 2014)
  - (Scotland) Aberdeen **2–2** Rijeka (2015–16, 23 July 2015)
  - Rijeka **2–2** (Turkey) İstanbul Başakşehir (2016–17, 4 August 2016)
  - (Greece) AEK Athens **2–2** Rijeka (2017–18, 23 November 2017)
  - (Spain) Real Sociedad **2–2** Rijeka (2020–21, 3 December 2020)

==== Highest scoring matches ====
- In Yugoslav First League
  - Rijeka **6–3** Radnički Beograd (1960–61, 2 April 1961)
  - NK Zagreb **3–6** Rijeka (1980–81, 31 August 1980)
  - Rijeka **5–4** Radnički Niš (1981–82, 23 August 1981)
  - Rijeka **6–3** Dinamo Vinkovci (1982–83, 4 June 1983)
- In Croatian First Football League
  - Istra 1961 **3–6** Rijeka (2021–22, 2 October 2021)
  - Rijeka **2–7** Dinamo Zagreb (2022–23, 13 November 2022)
- In Yugoslav Cup
  - Crvena Zvezda **8–1** Rijeka (1952, 5 October 1952)
- In Croatian Cup
  - Rijeka **11–0** Zmaj Blato (2013–14, 9 October 2013)
  - Buje **0–11** Rijeka (2019–20, 1 October 2019)
- In UEFA competitions
  - (Malta) Valletta **4–5** Rijeka (2000–01, 24 August 2000)

=== Records and statistics by season ===
==== Points ====
First division (Yugoslav First League and Croatian First Football League) only.

- Most points in one season:
  - 3 pts for a win: **88** in 36 matches (2016–17).
  - 2 pts for a win: **42** in 34 matches (1983–84).
- Highest percentage of points in one season:
  - 3 pts for a win: **81.5%** (2016–17).
  - 2 pts for a win: **65.0%** (1992–93).
- Fewest points in one season:
  - 3 pts for a win: **33** in 32 matches (2000–01, 2002–03).
  - 2 pts for a win: **18** in 22 matches (1959–60).
- Lowest percentage of points in one season:
  - 3 pts for a win: **34.4%** (2000–01, 2002–03).
  - 2 pts for a win: **33.8%** (1968–69).

==== Matches ====
- Most matches played in one season:
  - Overall: **57** (2025–26).
  - In Yugoslav First League: **36** (1990–91).
  - In Croatian First Football League: **36** (1995–96, 2013–14, 2014–15, 2015–16, 2016–17, 2017–18, 2018–19, 2019–20, 2020–21, 2021–22, 2022–23, 2023–24, 2024–25, 2025–26).
  - In Yugoslav Cup: **8** (1986–87).
  - In Croatian Cup: **10** (1993–94).
  - In UEFA competitions: **16** (2025–26).
- Fewest matches played in one season:
  - Overall: **18** (1952).
  - In Yugoslav First League: **22** (1958–59, 1959–60, 1960–61, 1961–62).
  - In Croatian First Football League: **22** (1992).

==== Wins ====
- Most wins in one season:
  - All official fixtures
    - **35** in 55 matches (2014–15)
    - **33** in 44 matches (2016–17)
  - Highest percentage of fixtures (top flight only)
    - **75.0%** (2016–17)
  - In Yugoslav First League
    - **16** in 34 matches (1983–84)
    - **14** in 28 matches (1964–65)
    - Home
      - **14** in 17 matches (1983–84)
    - Away
      - **5** in 15 matches (1965–66)
      - **5** in 17 matches (1988–89)
  - In Croatian First Football League
    - **27** in 36 matches (2016–17)
    - Home
      - **17** in 18 matches (2016–17)
    - Away
      - **10** in 16 matches (1998–99, 2005–06)
      - **10** in 18 matches (2013–14, 2016–17, 2020–21)
  - In Yugoslav Cup
    - **5** in 5 matches (1977–78)
  - In Croatian Cup
    - **7** in 8 matches (2013–14)
    - **6** in 6 matches (2016–17)
    - **5** in 5 matches (2018–19)
    - **5** in 5 matches (2019–20)
  - In UEFA competitions
    - **8** in 12 matches (2014–15)
- Fewest wins in one season:
  - All official fixtures
    - **6** (1947–48, 1961–62)
  - Lowest percentage of fixtures (top flight only)
    - **22.7%** (1961–62)
  - In Yugoslav First League
    - **5** in 22 matches (1961–62)
    - Home
      - **3** in 11 matches (1961–62)
      - **6** in 17 matches (1975–76)
    - Away
      - **0** in 17 matches (1974–75)
  - In Croatian First Football League
    - **8** in 30 matches (1994–95)
    - Home
      - **4** in 16 matches (2000–01)
    - Away
      - **0** in 16 matches (2002–03)

==== Defeats ====
- Most defeats in one season:
  - All official fixtures
    - **21** (1968–69)
  - Highest percentage of fixtures (top flight only)
    - **58.8%** (1968–69)
  - In Yugoslav First League
    - **20** in 34 matches (1968–69)
    - Home
      - **5** in 17 matches (1968–69)
      - **4** in 11 matches (1959–60)
    - Away
      - **15** in 17 matches (1968–69)
  - In Croatian First Football League
    - **17** in 32 matches (2000–01, 2002–03)
    - **17** in 36 matches (1995–96)
    - Home
      - **8** in 18 matches (2022–23)
      - **7** in 16 matches (2000–01)
      - **6** in 15 matches (1994–95)
    - Away
      - **12** in 16 matches (2002–03)
      - **12** in 18 matches (1995–96)
  - In domestic cups
    - **2** (7 times)
  - In UEFA competitions
    - **5** in 12 matches (2017–18)
    - **5** in 16 matches (2025–26)
- Fewest defeats in one season:
  - All official fixtures
    - **1** (1969–70)
    - **2** in 44 matches (2016–17)
  - Lowest percentage of fixtures (top flight only)
    - **2.8%** (2015–16)
  - In Yugoslav First League
    - **5** in 22 matches (1961–62)
    - **8** in 34 matches (1983–84)
    - Home
      - **0** in 17 matches (1976–77, 1979–80, 1983–84)
    - Away
      - **2** in 11 matches (1961–62)
  - In Croatian First Football League
    - **1** in 36 matches (2015–16)
    - Home
      - **0** in 18 matches (2013–14, 2015–16, 2016–17)
      - **0** in 16 matches (1997–98, 2004–05)
      - **0** in 15 matches (1992–93)
    - Away
      - **1** in 18 matches (2015–16)

==== Draws ====
- Most draws in one season:
  - All official fixtures
    - **20** in 44 matches (1993–94)
  - Highest percentage of fixtures (top flight only)
    - **54.5%** (1961–62)
  - In Yugoslav First League
    - **14** in 34 matches (1987–88)
    - **12** in 22 matches (1961–62)
    - Home
      - **9** in 17 matches (1987–88)
    - Away
      - **8** in 17 matches (1977–78, 1985–86)
      - **7** in 11 matches (1961–62)
  - In Croatian First Football League
    - **17** in 34 matches (1993–94)
    - Home
      - **8** in 16 matches (1997–98)
      - **8** in 17 matches (1993–94)
    - Away
      - **9** in 17 matches (1993–94)
  - In domestic cups
    - **5** in 8 matches (1986–87)
  - In UEFA competitions
    - **6** in 12 matches (2013–14)
- Fewest draws in one season:
  - All official fixtures
    - **1** (1948–49, 1952)
  - Lowest percentage of fixtures (top flight only)
    - **9.1%** (1960–61)
  - In Yugoslav First League
    - **2** in 22 matches (1960–61)
    - Home
      - **1** in 14 matches (1964–65)
    - Away
      - **0** in 11 matches (1960–61)
      - **1** in 17 matches (1968–69, 1979–80)
  - In Croatian First Football League
    - **4** in 36 matches (2017–18)
    - **4** in 32 matches (1998–99)
    - Home
      - **1** in 18 matches (2016–17, 2017–18)
      - **1** in 17 matches (2008–09)
    - Away
      - **0** in 16 matches (2005–06)

==== Goals scored ====
- Most goals scored in one season:
  - All official fixtures
    - **117** in 55 matches (2014–15)
  - Highest average per match (top flight only)
    - **2.11** (2014–15)
  - In Yugoslav First League
    - **53** in 34 matches (1983–84)
    - **47** in 28 matches (1964–65)
    - Home
      - **36** in 17 matches (1983–84)
      - **34** in 14 matches (1964–65)
    - Away
      - **20** in 17 matches (1980–81)
      - **19** in 15 matches (1965–66)
      - **18** in 11 matches (1959–60)
  - In Croatian First Football League
    - **76** in 36 matches (2014–15)
    - Home
      - **56** in 18 matches (2014–15)
    - Away
      - **36** in 18 matches (2021–22)
  - In domestic cups
    - **22** in 8 matches (2005–06)
    - **19** in 6 matches (2016–17)
    - **18** in 5 matches (2018–19)
    - **18** in 5 matches (2019–20)
  - In UEFA competitions
    - **23** in 12 matches (2014–15)
- Fewest goals scored in one season:
  - All official fixtures
    - **20** in 24 matches (1961–62)
  - Lowest average per match (top flight only)
    - **0.73** (1994–95)
  - In Yugoslav First League
    - **17** in 22 matches (1961–62)
    - **29** in 34 matches (1989–90)
    - Home
      - **9** in 11 matches (1961–62)
    - Away
      - **8** in 17 matches (1974–75)
      - **8** in 11 matches (1961–62)
  - In Croatian First Football League
    - **22** in 30 matches (1994–95)
    - Home
      - **12** in 15 matches (1994–95)
    - Away
      - **8** in 11 matches (1992)
      - **10** in 16 matches (1997–98)

==== Goals conceded ====
- Fewest goals conceded in one season:
  - All official fixtures
    - **11** in 30 matches (1969–70)
  - Lowest average per match (top flight only)
    - **0.56** (2015–16)
  - In Yugoslav First League
    - **21** in 22 matches (1961–62)
    - **25** in 36 matches (1990–91)
    - Home
      - **3** in 18 matches (1990–91)
    - Away
      - **8** in 11 matches (1961–62)
  - In Croatian First Football League
    - **20** in 36 matches (2015–16)
    - Home
      - **4** in 11 matches (1992)
      - **5** in 15 matches (1992–93)
    - Away
      - **11** in 18 matches (2015–16)
- Most goals conceded in one season:
  - All official fixtures
    - **68** in 42 matches (2006–07)
  - Highest average per match (top flight only)
    - **2.36** (1959–60)
  - In Yugoslav First League
    - **54** in 34 matches (1981–82)
    - **52** in 22 matches (1959–60)
    - Home
      - **21** in 13 matches (1963–64)
      - **19** in 11 matches (1959–60)
    - Away
      - **40** in 17 matches (1968–69, 1979–80)
  - In Croatian First Football League
    - **56** in 36 matches (1995–96)
    - **53** in 33 matches (2006–07)
    - Home
      - **23** in 16 matches (2006–07)
      - **23** in 18 matches (2022–23)
      - **23** in 18 matches (2021–22)
      - **23** in 18 matches (1995–96)
    - Away
      - **33** in 18 matches (1995–96)
      - **31** in 16 matches (2008–09)
  - In domestic cups
    - **10** in 6 matches (1995–96)
    - **10** in 8 matches (2004–05)
  - In UEFA competitions
    - **17** in 12 matches (2017–18)
    - **17** in 16 matches (2025–26)

==== Goal difference ====
- Best league goal difference in one season:
  - In Yugoslav First League
    - **+17** in 28 matches (1964–65)
    - Home
      - **+28** in 17 matches (1983–84)
    - Away
      - **0** in 11 matches (1961–62)
  - In Croatian First Football League
    - **+48** in 36 matches (2016–17)
    - Home
      - **+44** in 18 matches (2014–15)
    - Away
      - **+15** in 18 matches (2016–17)
- Worst league goal difference in one season:
  - In Yugoslav First League
    - **–22** in 22 matches (1959–60)
    - Home
      - **–7** in 11 matches (1959–60)
    - Away
      - **–30** in 17 matches (1968–69)
  - In Croatian First Football League
    - **–14** in 32 matches (2000–01)
    - Home
      - **–2** in 18 matches (2022–23)
      - **–1** in 15 matches (1994–95, 2010–11)
    - Away
      - **–22** in 18 matches (1995–96)

==== Disciplinary ====
Croatian First Football League only.

- Yellow cards:
  - Most (total): **90** in 36 matches (2015–16).
  - Fewest (total): **29** in 22 matches (1992).
  - Most (average per match): **2.719** (1998–99).
  - Fewest (average per match): **1.318** (1992).
- Red cards:
  - Most (total): **10** in 32 matches (2000–01).
  - Fewest (total): **0** in 32 matches (2004–05).
  - Most (average per match): **0.313** (2000–01).
  - Fewest (average per match): **0.000** (2004–05).

=== Sequences and runs ===
Currently active sequences are in bold/italics.

==== Goals ====
- Longest streak without conceding a goal:
  - In Yugoslav First League: **506 minutes** (11 Apr 1976 to 6 Jun 1976).
  - In Croatian First Football League: **783 minutes** (2 Aug 2015 to 4 Oct 2015).
    - Home: **672 minutes** (13 Jun 1992 to 15 Nov 1992).
    - Away: **524 minutes** (12 Apr 1995 to 10 Sep 1995).
  - In Yugoslav Cup: **576 minutes** (29 Mar 1978 to 16 May 1979).
  - In Croatian Cup: **510 minutes** (1 Jun 1994 to 8 Mar 1995).
  - In UEFA competitions: **410 minutes** (7 Nov 2013 to 24 Jul 2014).
  - All official matches:
    - Seasons in top flight: **873 minutes** (2 Aug 2015 to 4 Oct 2015).
    - Seasons in Yugoslav Second League: **917 minutes** (1969–70).
- Longest streak without scoring a goal:
  - In Yugoslav First League: **515 minutes** (27 Mar 1988 to 1 May 1988).
  - In Croatian First Football League: **493 minutes** (14 Feb 2021 to 12 Mar 2021).
    - Home: **448 minutes** (23 Oct 2010 to 9 Apr 2011).
    - Away: **518 minutes** (10 Sep 1995 to 11 Nov 1995).
  - In Yugoslav Cup: at least **180 minutes** (2 times).
  - In Croatian Cup: **339 minutes** (24 Oct 2001 to 17 Sep 2003).
  - In UEFA competitions: **421 minutes** (13 Sep 1978 to 3 Oct 1979).
- Longest scoring run:
  - In Yugoslav First League: **17 matches** (30 Mar 1986 to 7 Sep 1986).
  - In Croatian First Football League: **21 matches** (27 Apr 2014 to 6 Dec 2014).
    - Home: **36 matches** (12 Aug 2013 to 2 Aug 2015).
    - Away: **15 matches** (30 Oct 2004 to 1 Oct 2005).
  - In Yugoslav Cup: **6 matches** (7 Sep 1977 to 8 Nov 1978).
  - In Croatian Cup: **23 matches** (17 Sep 2003 to 25 Oct 2006).
  - In UEFA competitions: **7 matches** (14 Sep 2017 to 16 Aug 2018; 3 Dec 2020 to 26 Aug 2021).
- Longest conceding run:
  - In Yugoslav First League: **16 matches** (21 Jun 1959 to 17 Apr 1960).
  - In Croatian First Football League: **21 matches** (6 Apr 2002 to 30 Nov 2002).
    - Home: **15 matches** (23 Mar 2002 to 22 Mar 2003).
    - Away: **19 matches** (3 May 2009 to 31 Jul 2010).
  - In Yugoslav Cup: **8 matches** (2 times).
  - In Croatian Cup: **9 matches** (14 Mar 2000 to 29 Oct 2003).
  - In UEFA competitions: **11 matches** (19 Mar 1980 to 14 Sep 2000).

==== Wins ====
- Longest winning streak:
  - In Yugoslav First League: **5 matches** (28 May 1989 to 20 Aug 1989).
    - Home: **11 matches** (13 Sep 1964 to 29 Aug 1965).
    - Away: **2 matches** (3 times).
  - In Croatian First Football League: **10 matches** (31 Oct 1998 to 7 Mar 1999).
    - Home: **14 matches** (9 Nov 2008 to 12 Sep 2009).
    - Away: **5 matches** (26 Sep 2021 to 30 Jan 2022).
  - In Yugoslav Cup: **6 matches** (7 Sep 1977 to 8 Nov 1978).
    - Home: **4 matches** (13 Oct 1976 to 8 Nov 1978).
    - Away: **4 matches** (24 Oct 1977 to 24 May 1979).
  - In Croatian Cup: **13 matches** (26 Sep 2018 to 14 Apr 2021).
    - Home: **7 matches** (12 Apr 2005 to 13 Mar 2007).
    - Away: **9 matches** (4 Apr 2018 to 14 Apr 2021).
  - In UEFA competitions: **6 matches** (17 Jul 2014 to 18 Sep 2014).
    - Home: **3 matches** (4 times).
    - Away: **3 matches** (24 Jul 2014 to 28 Aug 2014).
- Longest winning streak (all official matches):
  - Seasons in top flight: **16 matches**, including 8 league, 5 European and 3 domestic cup matches (2 May 2014 to 24 Aug 2014).
    - Home: **16 matches** (1 Mar 2014 to 21 Sep 2014).
    - Away: **8 matches** (21 Sep 2021 to 30 Jan 2022).
- Longest winning streak (one or two-legged knock-out ties):
  - In Yugoslav Cup: **10 ties** (7 Sep 1977 to 24 May 1979).
  - In Croatian Cup: **13 ties** (22 Sep 2004 to 29 Nov 2006; 26 Sep 2018 to 14 Apr 2021).
  - In UEFA competitions: **6 ties** (18 Jul 2013 to 28 Aug 2014).
  - In all knock-out competitions: **16 ties** (18 Jul 2013 to 4 Mar 2015).

==== Unbeaten ====
- Longest unbeaten run:
  - In Yugoslav First League: **13 matches** (20 Oct 1985 to 27 Apr 1986).
    - Home: **43 matches** (20 Nov 1982 to 23 Jun 1985).
    - Away: **6 matches** (18 Mar 1984 to 9 Aug 1984).
  - In Croatian First Football League: **44 matches** (21 Feb 2016 to 6 May 2017).
    - Home: **53 matches** (21 Sep 2014 to 11 Aug 2017).
    - Away: **21 matches** (21 Feb 2016 to 6 May 2017).
  - In Yugoslav Cup: **14 matches** (1 Dec 1976 to 7 Nov 1981).
    - Home: **8 matches** (13 Oct 1976 to 27 Apr 1983).
    - Away: **7 matches** (26 Oct 1977 to 7 Nov 1981).
  - In Croatian Cup: **16 matches** (7 Apr 2004 to 3 May 2006).
    - Home: **15 matches** (7 Dec 2001 to 24 Nov 2010).
    - Away: **9 matches** (4 Apr 2018 to 14 Apr 2021).
  - In UEFA competitions: **9 matches** (7 Nov 2013 to 18 Sep 2014).
    - Home: **12 matches** (18 Jul 2013 to 16 Jul 2015).
    - Away: **4 matches** (3 times).
- Longest unbeaten run (all official matches):
  - Seasons in top flight: **45 matches** (5 Apr 2016 to 6 May 2017); third longest run in European football.
    - Home: **44 matches** (16 Jul 2015 to 11 Aug 2017).
    - Away: **23 matches** (5 Apr 2016 to 6 May 2017).
  - Seasons in lower divisions: **32 matches** (31 Aug 1969 to 6 Sep 1970).
    - Home: **39 matches** (25 Mar 1973 to 19 Jun 1975).
    - Away: **26 matches** (24 Aug 1969 to 17 Mar 1971).

==== Winless ====
- Longest streak without a win:
  - In Yugoslav First League: **10 matches** in 1959, 1961–62 and 1978–79.
    - Home: **6 matches** (15 Oct 1961 to 26 Aug 1962).
    - Away: **30 matches** (30 Oct 1968 to 13 Sep 1975).
  - In Croatian First Football League: **10 matches** (16 Jul 2022 to 9 Oct 2022).
    - Home: **8 matches** (8 Nov 2020 to 21 Mar 2021).
    - Away: **22 matches** (14 Apr 2002 to 25 Oct 2003).
  - In Yugoslav Cup: **4 matches** in 1961–65 and 1987–89.
    - Home: **2 matches** (2 times).
    - Away: **11 matches** (2 Dec 1959 to 26 Oct 1977).
  - In Croatian Cup: **4 matches** in 2001–03.
    - Home: **4 matches** (25 Oct 1996 to 29 Oct 2003).
    - Away: **4 matches** (31 Aug 1993 to 7 Sep 1994).
  - In UEFA competitions: **7 matches** (2 times).
    - Home: **4 matches** (11 Jul 2017 to 7 Dec 2017; 1 Aug 2024 to 21 Aug 2025).
    - Away: **9 matches** (27 Sep 1978 to 24 Aug 2000).

==== Defeats ====
- Longest losing streak:
  - In Yugoslav First League: **6 matches** in 1959 and 1968.
    - Home: **4 matches** (14 Jun 1959 to 6 Dec 1959).
    - Away: **8 matches** (3 times).
  - In Croatian First Football League: **7 matches** (28 Sep 2002 to 16 Nov 2002).
    - Home: **3 matches** (3 times).
    - Away: **8 matches** (14 Apr 2002 to 9 Nov 2002).
  - In Yugoslav Cup: **4 matches** in 1962–66.
    - Home: **2 matches** (8 Apr 1959 to 27 Feb 1966).
    - Away: **11 matches** (2 Dec 1959 to 26 Oct 1977).
  - In Croatian Cup: **3 matches** (2 times).
    - Home: **4 matches** (20 Mar 1996 to 7 Dec 2001).
    - Away: **2 matches** (3 times).
  - In UEFA competitions: **4 matches** (16 Aug 2017 to 28 Sep 2017; 22 Oct 2020 to 26 Nov 2020).
    - Home: **3 matches** (22 Aug 2017 to 7 Dec 2017).
    - Away: **7 matches** (30 Jun 2002 to 6 Aug 2009).

==== Draws ====
- Longest drawing streak:
  - In Yugoslav First League: **5 matches** (1 Nov 1987 to 6 Dec 1987).
    - Home: **4 matches** (2 times).
    - Away: **5 matches** (20 Oct 1985 to 27 Apr 1986).
  - In Croatian First Football League: **4 matches** (6 times).
    - Home: **4 matches** (4 times).
    - Away: **5 matches** (2 times).
  - In Yugoslav Cup: **2 matches** in 1979–80 and 1986–87.
    - Home: **1 match** (4 times).
    - Away: **3 matches** (2 times).
  - In Croatian Cup: **3 matches** in 2008.
    - Home: **2 matches** (13 Mar 2007 to 12 Nov 2008).
    - Away: **2 matches** (29 Oct 2008 to 26 Nov 2008).
  - In UEFA competitions: **3 matches** in 2013 and 2015–16.
    - Home: **3 matches** (2 times).
    - Away: **2 matches** (4 times).
- Longest streak without a draw:
  - In Yugoslav First League: **15 matches** (20 Apr 1988 to 2 Oct 1988).
    - Home: **11 matches** (13 Sep 1964 to 29 Aug 1965).
    - Away: **16 matches** (20 May 1979 to 5 Jun 1980).
  - In Croatian First Football League: **23 matches** (16 Aug 1998 to 2 May 1999).
    - Home: **16 matches** (21 Sep 2008 to 12 Sep 2009).
    - Away: **25 matches** (21 May 2005 to 24 Feb 2007).
  - In Yugoslav Cup: **16 matches** in 1952–67.
    - Home: **9 matches** (16 May 1979 to 19 Nov 1986).
    - Away: **21 matches** (11 Nov 1951 to 24 May 1979).
  - In Croatian Cup: **24 matches** (26 Nov 2008 to 22 Apr 2015).
    - Home: **14 matches** (15 Jun 1994 to 8 Mar 2005).
    - Away: **38 matches** (26 Nov 2008 to 19 oct 2022).
  - In UEFA competitions: **8 matches** (21 Jun 2008 to 8 Aug 2013).
    - Home: **9 matches** (5 Mar 1980 to 13 Jul 2006).
    - Away: **8 matches** (14 Sep 2000 to 8 Aug 2013).

==== Longest sequences and runs against single opposition in the Croatian First Football League ====
- Longest winning streak
  - Overall: **9 matches** v. Istra 1961.
  - Home: **11 matches** v. Lokomotiva and Osijek.
  - Away: **9 matches** v. Istra 1961.
- Longest unbeaten run
  - Overall: **31 matches** v. Slaven Belupo.
  - Home: **26 matches** v. Istra 1961.
  - Away: **14 matches** v. Slaven Belupo and Istra 1961.
- Longest streak without a win
  - Overall: **16 matches** v. Dinamo Zagreb.
  - Home: **9 matches** v. Dinamo Zagreb.
  - Away: **11 matches** v. Dinamo Zagreb and Osijek.
- Longest losing streak
  - Overall: **10 matches** v. Hajduk Split.
  - Home: **5 matches** v. Hajduk Split.
  - Away: **9 matches** v. Osijek.
- Longest drawing streak
  - Overall: **8 matches** v. Cibalia.
  - Home: **4 matches** v. Cibalia.
  - Away: **5 matches** v. Cibalia and Slaven Belupo.
- Longest streak without a draw
  - Overall: **24 matches** v. Lokomotiva.
  - Home: **15 matches** v. Osijek.
  - Away: **16 matches** v. Dinamo Zagreb and Hajduk Split.

=== Opponents and familiarity ===
- Club played most often:
  - All official matches
    - **192 times** v. (Socialist Federal Republic of Yugoslavia) (Croatia) Dinamo Zagreb
  - In domestic leagues
    - **167 times** v. (Socialist Federal Republic of Yugoslavia) (Croatia) Hajduk Split
  - In domestic cups
    - **27 times** v. (Socialist Federal Republic of Yugoslavia) (Croatia) Dinamo Zagreb
  - In UEFA competitions
    - **4 times** v. (Belgium) Standard Liège (1986–87, 2014–15)
    - **4 times** v. (Scotland) Aberdeen (2015–16, 2019–20)
    - **4 times** v. (Greece) PAOK (2021–22, 2025–26)
    - **4 times** v. (Cyprus) Omonia (2006–07, 2025–26)
  - In one season
    - **7 times** v. (Croatia) Hajduk Split (2005–06)
    - **7 times** v. (Croatia) Dinamo Zagreb (2014–15)
- Non-home ground Rijeka has played on most often:
  - **104 times** at Maksimir (96 times v. (Socialist Federal Republic of Yugoslavia) (Croatia) Dinamo Zagreb, 8 times v. (Croatia) Lokomotiva)
- Player who has scored the most goals against Rijeka:
  - In Yugoslav First League
    - **13**, (Socialist Federal Republic of Yugoslavia) Slaven Zambata (with Dinamo Zagreb)
  - In Croatian First Football League
    - **13**, (Algeria) El Arabi Hillel Soudani (with Dinamo Zagreb)
  - In Croatian Cup
    - **3**, (Bosnia and Herzegovina) Zoran Kvržić (with Osijek)
    - **3**, (Croatia) Nikola Šafarić (with Varteks)
  - In UEFA competitions
    - **3**, (Malta) Gilbert Agius (with (Malta) Valletta)
  - In Adriatic derby
    - **10**, (Croatia) Mijo Caktaš
  - In Dinamo–Rijeka derby
    - **14**, (Algeria) El Arabi Hillel Soudani
  - In Rijeka–Pula derby
    - **4**, (Bosnia and Herzegovina) Gedeon Guzina

=== Records and statistics against major rivals ===
As of 23 May 2026.

==== v. Hajduk Split ====
| Competition | Played | Rijeka wins | Draws | Hajduk wins | Rijeka goals | Hajduk goals |
(Socialist Federal Republic of Yugoslavia) Yugoslav championship (1946–1991)
| League | 58 | 11 | 23 | 24 | 61 | 90 |
| Yugoslav Cup | 5 | 2 | 2 | 1 | 6 | 5 |
| **Yugoslavia totals** | 63 | 13 | 25 | 25 | 67 | 95 |
(Croatia) Croatian championship (1992–present)
| Prva HNL | 109 | 40 | 28 | 41 | 144 | 141 |
| Croatian Cup | 11 | 5 | 5 | 1 | 16 | 12 |
| Supercup | 1 | 0 | 0 | 1 | 0 | 1 |
| **Croatia totals** | 121 | 45 | 33 | 43 | 160 | 154 |
TOTALS
| **League** | **167** | **51** | **51** | **65** | **205** | **231** |
| **League (H)** | **84** | **32** | **30** | **22** | **111** | **79** |
| **League (A)** | **83** | **19** | **21** | **43** | **94** | **152** |
| **Cup** | **16** | **7** | **7** | **2** | **22** | **17** |
| **ALL TIME** | **184** | **58** | **58** | **68** | **227** | **249** |

- Extreme wins and defeats:
  - Home win:
    - In Yugoslav First League
      - **4–0**, 1962–63, 9 September 1962
    - In Croatian First Football League
      - **5–0**, 2025–26, 22 November 2025
  - Away win:
    - In Yugoslav First League
      - **3–1**, 1975–76, 13 September 1975
      - **2–0**, 1962–63, 24 March 1963
    - In Croatian First Football League
      - **4–0**, 2005–06, 22 April 2006
      - **4–0**, 2019–20, 1 December 2019
  - Home defeat:
    - In Yugoslav First League
      - **1–4**, 1974–75, 29 June 1975
    - In Croatian First Football League
      - **0–3**, 1995–96, 17 February 1996
      - **0–3**, 2011–12, 21 March 2012
      - **0–3**, 2021–22, 8 May 2022
  - Away defeat:
    - In Yugoslav First League
      - **2–6**, 1958–59, 7 June 1959
      - **0–4**, 1959–60, 13 September 1959
      - **0–4**, 1965–66, 24 October 1965
      - **0–4**, 1988–89, 28 May 1989
    - In Croatian First Football League
      - **0–4**, 2003–04, 28 February 2004
      - **0–4**, 2018–19, 20 April 2019
- Longest winning streak
  - **5 matches** (1 November 2015 to 11 March 2017)
  - Home: **3 matches** (4 times)
  - Away: **4 matches** (18 April 2015 to 11 March 2017)
- Longest unbeaten run
  - **20 matches** (21 March 2012 to 2 December 2017)
  - Home: **14 matches** (4 April 1976 to 10 October 1990); league only: **15 matches** (4 April 1976 to 16 May 1992)
  - Away: **13 matches** (7 August 2011 to 20 April 2019)
- Longest streak without a win
  - **12 matches** (3 November 1979 to 9 March 1986)
  - Home: **6 matches** (30 July 1989 to 8 June 1994)
  - Away: **18 matches** (26 February 1978 to 12 December 1993)
- Longest losing streak
  - **10 matches** (26 November 2000 to 12 March 2005)
  - Home: **5 matches** (10 February 2021 to 16 April 2023)
  - Away: **7 matches** (23 November 1999 to 9 April 2005)

==== v. Dinamo Zagreb ====
| Competition | Played | Rijeka wins | Draws | Dinamo wins | Rijeka goals | Dinamo goals |
(Socialist Federal Republic of Yugoslavia) Yugoslav championship (1946–1991)
| League | 58 | 16 | 16 | 26 | 61 | 96 |
| Yugoslav Cup | 2 | 0 | 0 | 2 | 2 | 8 |
| **Yugoslavia totals** | 60 | 16 | 16 | 28 | 63 | 104 |
(Croatia) Croatian championship (1992–present)
| Prva HNL | 107 | 20 | 26 | 61 | 101 | 207 |
| Croatian Cup | 22 | 9 | 3 | 10 | 25 | 28 |
| Supercup | 3 | 1 | 0 | 2 | 3 | 6 |
| **Croatia totals** | 132 | 30 | 29 | 73 | 129 | 241 |
TOTALS
| **League** | **165** | **36** | **42** | **87** | **162** | **303** |
| **League (H)** | **81** | **28** | **28** | **25** | **107** | **104** |
| **League (A)** | **84** | **8** | **14** | **62** | **55** | **199** |
| **Cup** | **24** | **9** | **3** | **12** | **27** | **36** |
| **ALL TIME** | **192** | **46** | **45** | **101** | **192** | **345** |

- Extreme wins and defeats:
  - Home win:
    - In Yugoslav First League
      - **4–0**, 1977–78, 6 May 1978
    - In Croatian First Football League
      - **4–0**, 2024–25, 22 February 2025
  - Away win:
    - In Yugoslav First League
      - **3–2**, 1964–65, 7 March 1965
      - **2–1**, 1980–81, 10 May 1981
    - In Croatian First Football League
      - **2–0**, 2020–21, 19 January 2021
  - Home defeat:
    - In Yugoslav First League
      - **0–3**, 1963–64, 25 August 1963
    - In Croatian First Football League
      - **2–7**, 2022–23, 13 November 2022
      - **0–5**, 2019–20, 10 November 2019
  - Away defeat:
    - In Yugoslav First League
      - **0–6**, 1958–59, 21 June 1959
    - In Croatian First Football League
      - **0–6**, 2009–10, 20 September 2009
- Longest winning streak
  - **3 matches** (22 June 1980 to 10 May 1981; 7 May 2014 to 11 July 2014)
  - Home: **5 matches** (10 April 1977 to 26 October 1980)
  - Away: **1 match** (10 times)
- Longest unbeaten run
  - **4 matches** (5 times)
  - Home: **13 matches** (19 August 1964 to 27 April 1983); league only: **23 matches** (19 August 1964 to 11 May 1994)
  - Away: **3 matches** (7 March 1999 to 6 May 2000)
- Longest streak without a win
  - **14 matches** (1 December 2021 to 22 February 2025)
  - Home: **10 matches** (5 July 2020 to 22 February 2025)
  - Away: **20 matches** (10 May 1981 to 21 April 1999)
- Longest losing streak
  - **8 matches** (20 July 2006 to 27 July 2008)
  - Home: **4 matches** (1 October 1961 to 16 August 1964)
  - Away: **11 matches** (3 March 1991 to 7 March 1999)

=== Average home league attendance record ===
| Season | Attendance | Change |
|---|---|---|
(Socialist Federal Republic of Yugoslavia) **Yugoslav First League**
| 1958–59 | 13,700 | Steady |
| 1959–60 | 10,909 | ▼ |
| 1960–61 | 11,200 | ▲ |
| 1961–62 | 10,400 | ▼ |
| 1962–63 | 9,923 | ▼ |
| 1963–64 | 9,154 | ▼ |
| 1964–65 | 9,285 | ▲ |
| 1965–66 | 6,400 | ▼ |
| 1966–67 | 5,933 | ▼ |
| 1967–68 | 6,100 | ▲ |
| 1968–69 | 4,794 | ▼ |
| 1974–75 | 10,941 | ▲ |
| 1975–76 | 9,176 | ▼ |
| 1976–77 | 6,088 | ▼ |
| 1977–78 | 5,676 | ▼ |
| 1978–79 | 6,765 | ▲ |
| 1979–80 | 5,353 | ▼ |
| 1980–81 | 5,059 | ▼ |
| 1981–82 | 4,588 | ▼ |
| 1982–83 | 5,059 | ▲ |
| 1983–84 | 6,471 | ▲ |
| 1984–85 | 5,706 | ▼ |
| 1985–86 | 5,588 | ▼ |
| 1986–87 | 6,382 | ▲ |
| 1987–88 | 4,445 | ▼ |
| 1988–89 | 2,805 | ▼ |
| 1989–90 | 2,555 | ▼ |
| 1990–91 | 1,484 | ▼ |

| Season | Attendance | Change |
|---|---|---|
(Croatia) **Croatian First League**
| 1992 | 1,664 | ▲ |
| 1992–93 | 2,220 | ▲ |
| 1993–94 | 1,547 | ▼ |
| 1994–95 | 1,453 | ▼ |
| 1995–96 | 2,350 | ▲ |
| 1996–97 | 3,333 | ▲ |
| 1997–98 | 2,619 | ▼ |
| 1998–99 | 8,500 | ▲ |
| 1999–00 | 3,041 | ▼ |
| 2000–01 | 1,900 | ▼ |
| 2001–02 | 2,620 | ▲ |
| 2002–03 | 2,763 | ▲ |
| 2003–04 | 2,813 | ▲ |
| 2004–05 | 3,813 | ▲ |
| 2005–06 | 4,250 | ▲ |
| 2006–07 | 2,019 | ▼ |
| 2007–08 | 3,106 | ▲ |
| 2008–09 | 2,429 | ▼ |
| 2009–10 | 2,087 | ▼ |
| 2010–11 | 2,413 | ▲ |
| 2011–12 | 2,450 | ▲ |
| 2012–13 | 4,059 | ▲ |
| 2013–14 | 5,500 | ▲ |
| 2014–15 | 5,244 | ▼ |
| 2015–16 | 4,216 | ▼ |
| 2016–17 | 4,757 | ▲ |
| 2017–18 | 4,850 | ▲ |
| 2018–19 | 4,526 | ▼ |
| 2019–20 | 4,329 | ▼ |
| 2020–21 | 0 | ▼ |
| 2021–22 | 3,798 | ▲ |
| 2022–23 | 4,891 | ▲ |
| 2023–24 | 6,406 | ▲ |
| 2024–25 | 5,374 | ▼ |
| 2025–26 | 5,382 | ▲ |

Source: hrnogomet.com

=== Penalty shoot-out history ===
| Season | Competition | Location | Opponent | Result | |
| Season | Competition | Location | Opponent | Full-time | Shoot-out |
|---|---|---|---|---|---|
| 1952 | Cup | Rijeka | (Socialist Federal Republic of Yugoslavia) Proleter Osijek | 0–0 | 4–3^{1} |
| 1966–67 | Cup | Rijeka | (Socialist Federal Republic of Yugoslavia) Red Star | 1–1 | 4–5 |
| 1969–70 | 1. Div qual. | Crvenka | (Socialist Federal Republic of Yugoslavia) Crvenka | 2–2 (2–2 agg.) | 5–6 |
| 1970–71 | 1. Div qual. | Rijeka | (Socialist Federal Republic of Yugoslavia) Osijek | 0–0 (0–0 agg.) | 5–6 |
| 1978–79 | Cup | Rijeka | (Socialist Federal Republic of Yugoslavia) Istra | 0–0 | 4–3 |
| 1979–80 | Cup | Sarajevo | (Socialist Federal Republic of Yugoslavia) Sarajevo | 1–1 | 2–4 |
| 1980–81 | Cup | Belgrade | (Socialist Federal Republic of Yugoslavia) Partizan | 2–2 | 2–4 |
| 1983–84 | Cup | Vitez | (Socialist Federal Republic of Yugoslavia) Vitez | 0–0 | 6–5 |
| 1984–85 | Cup | Belgrade | (Socialist Federal Republic of Yugoslavia) Partizan | 0–0 | 3–4 |
| 1986–87 | Cup | Rijeka | (Socialist Federal Republic of Yugoslavia) Željezničar | 0–0 (0–0 agg.) | 4–2 |
| 1986–87 | Cup | Belgrade | (Socialist Federal Republic of Yugoslavia) Hajduk Split | 1–1 | 8–9 |
| 1988–89 | 1. Div ^{2} | Rijeka | (Socialist Federal Republic of Yugoslavia) Spartak | 0–0 | 5–6 |
| 1988–89 | 1. Div ^{2} | Tuzla | (Socialist Federal Republic of Yugoslavia) Sloboda | 0–0 | 4–5 |
| 1988–89 | 1. Div ^{2} | Novi Sad | (Socialist Federal Republic of Yugoslavia) Vojvodina | 0–0 | 3–4 |
| 1988–89 | 1. Div ^{2} | Rijeka | (Socialist Federal Republic of Yugoslavia) Partizan | 1–1 | 3–4 |
| 1988–89 | 1. Div ^{2} | Rijeka | (Socialist Federal Republic of Yugoslavia) Hajduk Split | 0–0 | 1–3 |
| 1988–89 | 1. Div ^{2} | Rijeka | (Socialist Federal Republic of Yugoslavia) Radnički Niš | 0–0 | 4–5 |
| 1988–89 | 1. Div ^{2} | Rijeka | (Socialist Federal Republic of Yugoslavia) Sarajevo | 0–0 | 2–3 |
| 1989–90 | 1. Div ^{2} | Rijeka | (Socialist Federal Republic of Yugoslavia) Budućnost | 0–0 | 5–4 |
| 1989–90 | 1. Div ^{2} | Zagreb | (Socialist Federal Republic of Yugoslavia) Dinamo Zagreb | 1–1 | 3–4 |
| 1989–90 | 1. Div ^{2} | Skopje | (Socialist Federal Republic of Yugoslavia) Vardar | 0–0 | 5–4 |
| 1989–90 | 1. Div ^{2} | Split | (Socialist Federal Republic of Yugoslavia) Hajduk Split | 1–1 | 6–5 |
| 1989–90 | 1. Div ^{2} | Rijeka | (Socialist Federal Republic of Yugoslavia) Olimpija | 0–0 | 3–2 |
| 1989–90 | 1. Div ^{2} | Rijeka | (Socialist Federal Republic of Yugoslavia) Dinamo Zagreb | 1–1 | 4–1 |
| 1990–91 | Cup | Zadar | (Socialist Federal Republic of Yugoslavia) Zadar | 0–0 | 4–2 |
| 1990–91 | 1. Div ^{2} | Rijeka | (Socialist Federal Republic of Yugoslavia) Dinamo Zagreb | 0–0 | 3–1 |
| 1990–91 | 1. Div ^{2} | Split | (Socialist Federal Republic of Yugoslavia) Hajduk Split | 1–1 | 6–5 |
| 1990–91 | 1. Div ^{2} | Rijeka | (Socialist Federal Republic of Yugoslavia) Red Star | 0–0 | 1–3 |
| 1990–91 | 1. Div ^{2} | Rijeka | (Socialist Federal Republic of Yugoslavia) Željezničar | 1–1 | 1–4 |
| 1990–91 | 1. Div ^{2} | Rijeka | (Socialist Federal Republic of Yugoslavia) Borac | 0–0 | 9–10 |
| 1990–91 | 1. Div ^{2} | Rijeka | (Socialist Federal Republic of Yugoslavia) Zemun | 0–0 | 1–3 |
| 1990–91 | 1. Div ^{2} | Rijeka | (Socialist Federal Republic of Yugoslavia) Hajduk Split | 0–0 | 1–3 |
| 1990–91 | 1. Div ^{2} | Rijeka | (Socialist Federal Republic of Yugoslavia) Rad | 0–0 | 6–5 |
| 1990–91 | 1. Div ^{2} | Novi Sad | (Socialist Federal Republic of Yugoslavia) Vojvodina | 1–1 | 2–4 |
| 1990–91 | 1. Div ^{2} | Banja Luka | (Socialist Federal Republic of Yugoslavia) Borac | 0–0 | 3–4 |
| 1992 | Cup | Zagreb | (Croatia) HAŠK Građanski | 1–2 (3–3 agg.) | 1–3 |
| 1994–95 | Cup | Rijeka | (Croatia) Osijek | 1–0 (1–1 agg.) | 2–4 |
| 2001–02 | Cup | Zagreb | (Croatia) H. Dragovoljac | 1–1 | 5–4 |
| 2006–07 | Cup | Zagreb | (Croatia) H. Dragovoljac | 0–0 | 5–3 |
| 2008–09 | Cup | Zadar | (Croatia) Zadar | 2–2 | 5–4 |
| 2008–09 | Cup | Zagreb | (Croatia) NK Zagreb | 2–2 (4–4 agg.) | 2–4 |
| 2013–14 | Cup | Osijek | (Croatia) Osijek | 0–1 (1–1 agg.) | 4–2 |
| 2022–23 | Cup | Kutina | (Croatia) Moslavina | 1–1 | 5–4 |

^{1}This was the first ever match in a well-known competition that used the penalty shootout procedure to decide a tie.
^{2} For three consecutive seasons (from 1988–89 to 1990–91), if a league fixture ended in a draw, penalty shoot-outs were used to determine which side will be awarded one point (the losing side did not get a point).
Sources: List of HNK Rijeka seasons, Glasilo Hrvatskog nogometnog saveza

== Bibliography ==
- Croatian Football Statistics (www.hrnogomet.com) (in Croatian)
- Football in the former Yugoslavia (www.exyufudbal.in.rs) (in Serbian)
- Lazzarich, Marinko (2008). Kantrida bijelih snova (in Croatian). Adamić. ISBN 978-953-219-393-0.
- Almanah Fudbalskog saveza Jugoslavije 1978–86 (in Serbo-Croatian). Football Association of Yugoslavia. 1986.
- Almanah Yu Fudbal 1987–88 (in Serbo-Croatian). Belgrade: Tempo. 1988.
- Almanah Yu Fudbal 1988–89 (in Serbo-Croatian). Belgrade: Tempo. 1989.
- Almanah Yu Fudbal 1989–90 (in Serbo-Croatian). Belgrade: Tempo. 1990.
- Almanah Yu Fudbal 1990–91 (in Serbo-Croatian). Belgrade: Tempo. 1991.
