= 1993–94 NK Rijeka season =

Rijeka
1993–94 season
- Chairman: Josip Lokmer
- Manager: Srećko Juričić
- Prva HNL: 6th
- Croatian Cup: Runners-up
- Top goalscorer: League: Mladen Mladenović (20); All: Mladen Mladenović (23)
- Highest home attendance: 15,000 vs Croatia Zagreb (15 June 1994 - Croatian Cup)
- Lowest home attendance: 350 vs (Croatia) Budućnost Hodošan (14 August 1993 - Croatian Cup)
- Average home league attendance: 1,547

The 1993–94 season was the 48th season in Rijeka's history. It was their 3rd season in the Prva HNL and 20th successive top tier season.

== Competitions ==
Competition	First match	Last match	Starting round	Final position	Record							
Competition	First match	Last match	Starting round	Final position	G	W	D	L	GF	GA	GD	Win %
Prva HNL	21 August 1993	12 June 1994	Matchday 1	6th	34	11	17	6	40	27	+13	32.35
Croatian Cup	14 August 1993	15 June 1994	First round	Runners-up	10	5	3	2	18	9	+9	50.00
Total					44	16	20	8	58	36	+22	36.36

=== Prva HNL ===
==== Classification ====
Pos	Team	Pld	W	D	L	GF	GA	GD	Pts
4	Inker Zaprešić	34	17	8	9	48	34	+14	42
5	Varteks	34	16	9	9	51	31	+20	41
6	Rijeka	34	11	17	6	40	27	+13	39
7	Cibalia	34	11	13	10	37	27	+10	35
8	Osijek	34	12	11	11	56	58	−2	35

Source: RSSSF.org
Rules for classification: 1st points; 2nd head-to-head points.

==== Results summary ====
Overall								Home						Away					
Pld	W	D	L	GF	GA	GD	Pts	W	D	L	GF	GA	GD	W	D	L	GF	GA	GD
34	11	17	6	40	27	+13	50	8	8	1	28	13	+15	3	9	5	12	14	−2

==== Results by round ====
Round	1	2	3	4	5	6	7	8	9	10	11	12	13	14	15	16	17	18	19	20	21	22	23	24	25	26	27	28	29	30	31	32	33	34
Ground	A	H	A	H	A	A	H	A	H	A	H	A	H	A	H	A	H	H	A	H	A	H	H	A	H	A	H	A	H	A	H	A	H	A
Result	L	D	D	D	W	D	W	D	D	D	D	L	W	L	W	W	D	W	D	W	W	W	D	D	D	D	W	L	L	L	D	D	W	D
Position	11	13	11	11	9	8	6	7	6	7	6	7	6	7	6	6	7	5	5	5	5	5	5	5	5	5	5	5	5	6	6	6	6	6

Source: Competitive matches
A = Away; H = Home; W = Win; D = Draw; L = Loss

== Matches ==
=== Prva HNL ===
Round	Date	Venue	Opponent	Score	Attendance	Rijeka Scorers	Report
1	21 Aug	A	Istra	0 – 1	4,000		HRnogomet.com
2	28 Aug	H	Cibalia	0 – 0	1,000		HRnogomet.com
3	4 Sep	A	Belišće	1 – 1	3,000	Scoria	HRnogomet.com
4	11 Sep	H	Zagreb	2 – 2	4,000	Mladenović, Samardžić	HRnogomet.com
5	18 Sep	A	Radnik	3 – 0	300	Mladenović (2), Raković	HRnogomet.com
6	25 Sep	AR	Šibenik	1 – 1	700	Mladenović	HRnogomet.com
7	2 Oct	H	Dubrava	2 – 1	400	Samardžić, Mladenović	HRnogomet.com
8	9 Oct	A	Primorac	1 – 1	3,000	Brajković	HRnogomet.com
9	16 Oct	H	Dubrovnik	2 – 2	500	Šašivarević, Kurtović	HRnogomet.com
10	24 Oct	A	Pazinka	0 – 0	1,000		HRnogomet.com
11	30 Oct	H	Osijek	1 – 1	400	Mladenović	HRnogomet.com
12	4 Nov	A	Croatia Zagreb	0 – 2	4,500		HRnogomet.com
13	13 Nov	H	Inker Zaprešić	2 – 1	500	Knežević (2)	HRnogomet.com
14	20 Nov	A	Segesta	0 – 2	400		HRnogomet.com
15	27 Nov	H	Varteks	3 – 0	400	Knežević (2), Mladenović	HRnogomet.com
16	12 Dec	A	Hajduk Split	2 – 0	3,500	Mladenović (2)	HRnogomet.com
17	19 Dec	H	Zadar	0 – 0	700		HRnogomet.com
18	27 Feb	H	Istra	2 – 0	2,000	Mladenović (2)	HRnogomet.com
19	6 Mar	A	Cibalia	0 – 0	5,000		HRnogomet.com
20	13 Mar	H	Belišće	2 – 0	1,000	Šašivarević, Mladenović	HRnogomet.com
21	20 Mar	A	Zagreb	2 – 1	4,000	Mladenović (2)	HRnogomet.com
22	27 Mar	H	Radnik	6 – 0	1,200	Mladenović (2), Knežević (2), Šašivarević, Tadić	HRnogomet.com
23	2 Apr	H	Šibenik	1 – 1	1,000	Knežević	HRnogomet.com
24	9 Apr	A	Dubrava	0 – 0	2,000		HRnogomet.com
25	17 Apr	H	Primorac	0 – 0	400		HRnogomet.com
26	24 Apr	A	Dubrovnik	0 – 0	1,500		HRnogomet.com
27	1 May	H	Pazinka	3 – 1	2,000	Mladenović (2), Aračić	HRnogomet.com
28	8 May	A	Osijek	0 – 2	8,000		HRnogomet.com
29	11 May	H	Croatia Zagreb	0 – 3	6,000		HRnogomet.com
30	14 May	A	Inker Zaprešić	1 – 2	3,000	Mladenović	HRnogomet.com
31	28 May	H	Segesta	0 – 0	800		HRnogomet.com
32	5 Jun	A	Varteks	1 – 1	3,000	Scoria	HRnogomet.com
33	8 Jun	H	Hajduk Split	2 – 1	4,000	Samardžić, Mladenović	HRnogomet.com
34	12 Jun	A	Zadar	0 – 0	3,500		HRnogomet.com

Source: HRnogomet.com

=== Croatian Cup ===
Round	Date	Venue	Opponent	Score	Attendance	Rijeka Scorers	Report
R1	14 Aug	H	Budućnost Hodošan	3 – 0	350	Knežević (2), Šašivarević	HRnogomet.com
R1	31 Aug	A	Budućnost Hodošan	3 – 2	1,500	Mladenović, Tadić, Raković	HRnogomet.com
R2	12 Oct	A	Belišće	0 – 0	1,000		HRnogomet.com
R2	26 Oct	H	Belišće	4 – 1	400	Tokić, Brajković, Tadić, Mladenović	HRnogomet.com
QF	16 Mar	A	Bjelovar	0 – 1	2,000		HRnogomet.com
QF	30 Mar	H	Bjelovar	4 – 0	3,000	Šašivarević, Knežević, Kurtović, Mladenović	HRnogomet.com
SF	13 Apr	H	Hajduk Split	0 – 0	12,000		HRnogomet.com
SF	27 Apr	A	Hajduk Split	3 – 3	15,000	Raković, o.g., Pavličić	HRnogomet.com
F	1 Jun	A	Croatia Zagreb	0 – 2	15,000		HRnogomet.com
F	15 Jun	H	Croatia Zagreb	1 – 0	15,000	Pavličić	HRnogomet.com

Source: HRnogomet.com

=== Squad statistics ===
Competitive matches only.
Appearances in brackets indicate numbers of times the player came on as a substitute.

Name	Apps	Goals	Apps	Goals	Apps	Goals
Name	League		Cup		Total	
(Croatia) Mladen Žganjer	33 (0)	0	8 (0)	0	41 (0)	0
(Croatia) Robert Rubčić	18 (1)	0	5 (1)	0	23 (2)	0
(Croatia) Mladen Romić	13 (0)	0	1 (0)	0	14 (0)	0
(Croatia) Ivan Kurtović	26 (1)	1	9 (0)	1	35 (1)	2
(Croatia) Dubravko Pavličić	25 (0)	0	8 (0)	2	33 (0)	2
(Croatia) Stojan Belajić	24 (1)	0	5 (1)	0	29 (2)	0
(Croatia) Elvis Brajković	32 (0)	1	10 (0)	1	42 (0)	2
(Bosnia and Herzegovina) Fuad Šašivarević	30 (0)	3	8 (0)	2	38 (0)	5
(Croatia) Elvis Scoria	16 (1)	2	6 (2)	0	22 (3)	2
(Croatia) Mladen Mladenović	31 (0)	20	9 (0)	3	40 (0)	23
(Croatia) Dragan Tadić	18 (8)	1	6 (1)	2	24 (9)	3
(Croatia) Damir Knežević	23 (2)	7	6 (1)	3	29 (3)	10
(Croatia) Dragan Raković	16 (9)	1	6 (4)	2	22 (13)	3
(Croatia) Mario Tokić	7 (9)	0	4 (0)	1	11 (9)	1
(Croatia) Jasmin Samardžić	11 (15)	3	4 (1)	0	15 (16)	3
(Croatia) Alen Horvat	17 (2)	0	6 (1)	0	23 (3)	0
(Croatia) Andrej Živković	12 (3)	0	3 (0)	0	15 (3)	0
(Croatia) Leandar Kelentrić	7 (5)	0	2 (2)	0	9 (7)	0
(Croatia) Ilija Aračić	6 (4)	1	0 (3)	0	6 (7)	1
(Croatia) Daniel Šarić	4 (0)	0	1 (0)	0	5 (0)	0
(Croatia) Jasmin Agić	1 (1)	0	0 (1)	0	1 (2)	0
(Croatia) Marijan Bjelanović	1 (0)	0	2 (0)	0	3 (0)	0
(Croatia) Vojko Rožmanić	2 (1)	0	1 (0)	0	3 (1)	0
(Croatia) Krešimir Brkljačić	0 (0)	0	0 (1)	0	0 (1)	0

== See also ==
- 1993–94 Prva HNL
- 1993–94 Croatian Cup

== External sources ==
- 1993–94 Prva HNL at HRnogomet.com
- 1993–94 Croatian Cup at HRnogomet.com
- Prvenstvo 1993.-94. at nk-rijeka.hr
