= 1994–95 NK Rijeka season =

Rijeka
1994–95 season
- Chairman: Krsto Pavić
- Manager: Zvjezdan Radin, Mladen Vranković, Josip Skoblar
- Prva HNL: 11th
- Croatian Cup: Quarterfinal
- Top goalscorer: League: Davor Dželalija (7); All: Davor Dželalija (8)
- Highest home attendance: 6,000 vs (Croatia) Hajduk Split (19 March 1995 - Prva HNL)
- Lowest home attendance: 200 (2 times - Croatian Cup)
- Average home league attendance: 1,453

The 1994–95 season was the 49th season in Rijeka's history. It was their 4th season in the Prva HNL and 21st successive top tier season.

== Competitions ==
Competition	First match	Last match	Starting round	Final position	Record							
Competition	First match	Last match	Starting round	Final position	G	W	D	L	GF	GA	GD	Win %
Prva HNL	14 August 1994	4 June 1995	Matchday 1	11th	30	8	10	12	22	32	−10	26.67
Croatian Cup	7 September 1994	5 April 1995	First round	Quarterfinal	6	5	0	1	10	1	+9	83.33
Total					36	13	10	13	32	33	−1	36.11

=== Prva HNL ===
==== Classification ====
Pos	Team	Pld	W	D	L	GF	GA	GD	Pts	Qualification or relegation
9	Šibenik	30	9	10	11	44	46	−2	37	
10	Cibalia	30	9	10	11	26	33	−7	37	
11	Rijeka	30	8	10	12	22	32	−10	34	
12	Istra Pula	30	8	8	14	30	46	−16	32	
13	Zadar (R)	30	7	10	13	33	47	−14	31	Relegation to Prva B HNL

Source: RSSSF.org
Rules for classification: 1st points; 2nd head-to-head points.
(R) Relegated

==== Results summary ====
Overall								Home						Away					
Pld	W	D	L	GF	GA	GD	Pts	W	D	L	GF	GA	GD	W	D	L	GF	GA	GD
30	8	10	12	22	32	−10	34	5	4	6	12	13	−1	3	6	6	10	19	−9

==== Results by round ====
Round	1	2	3	4	5	6	7	8	9	10	11	12	13	14	15	16	17	18	19	20	21	22	23	24	25	26	27	28	29	30
Ground	H	A	H	A	H	A	H	H	A	H	A	H	A	H	A	A	H	A	H	A	H	A	A	H	A	H	A	H	A	H
Result	L	D	L	L	W	D	W	L	L	D	W	D	L	W	W	L	W	L	L	D	W	L	D	D	D	L	W	L	D	D
Position	11	13	14	15	13	14	11	13	14	15	14	13	13	11	10	11	11	11	12	12	10	11	11	11	12	12	10	10	11	11

Source: Competitive matches
A = Away; H = Home; W = Win; D = Draw; L = Loss

== Matches ==
=== Prva HNL ===
Round	Date	Venue	Opponent	Score	Attendance	Rijeka Scorers	Report
1	14 Aug	H	Croatia Zagreb	1 – 2	4,000	Tadić	HRnogomet.com
2	21 Aug	A	Neretva	0 – 0	3,200		HRnogomet.com
3	28 Aug	H	Osijek	0 – 1	1,000		HRnogomet.com
4	10 Sep	A	Hajduk Split	2 – 5	3,500	Tokić, Dželalija	HRnogomet.com
5	18 Sep	H	Zadar	2 – 1	500	Aračić, Tadić	HRnogomet.com
6	24 Sep	A	Šibenik	0 – 0	3,500		HRnogomet.com
7	30 Sep	H	Marsonia	1 – 0	1,000	Dželalija	HRnogomet.com
8	16 Oct	H	Zagreb	0 – 1	1,500		HRnogomet.com
9	23 Oct	A	Istra	0 – 1	2,000		HRnogomet.com
10	30 Oct	H	Cibalia	0 – 0	1,000		HRnogomet.com
11	6 Nov	A	Belišće	2 – 1	1,000	Dželalija, Živković	HRnogomet.com
12	20 Nov	H	Primorac	0 – 0	300		HRnogomet.com
13	26 Nov	A	Inker Zaprešić	2 – 3	2,000	Živković, Dželalija	HRnogomet.com
14	4 Dec	H	Varteks	1 – 0	1,000	Samardžić	HRnogomet.com
15	11 Dec	A	Segesta	2 – 1	2,500	Dželalija, Milinović	HRnogomet.com
16	25 Feb	A	Croatia Zagreb	0 – 3	7,000		HRnogomet.com
17	5 Mar	H	Neretva	1 – 0	500	Dželalija	HRnogomet.com
18	12 Mar	A	Osijek	0 – 2	12,000		HRnogomet.com
19	19 Mar	H	Hajduk Split	0 – 1	6,000		HRnogomet.com
20	2 Apr	A	Zadar	0 – 0	5,000		HRnogomet.com
21	9 Apr	H	Šibenik	3 – 2	1,000	Brkić, Živković, Hodžić	HRnogomet.com
22	12 Apr	A	Marsonia	1 – 3	4,000	Perković	HRnogomet.com
23	16 Apr	A	Zagreb	0 – 0	1,500		HRnogomet.com
24	30 Apr	H	Istra	2 – 2	2,000	Hodžić (2)	HRnogomet.com
25	7 May	A	Cibalia	0 – 0	1,000		HRnogomet.com
26	14 May	H	Belišće	1 – 2	500	Dželalija	HRnogomet.com
27	21 May	A	Primorac	1 – 0	400	Sotošek	HRnogomet.com
28	24 May	H	Inker Zaprešić	0 – 1	500		HRnogomet.com
29	31 May	A	Varteks	0 – 0	1,500		HRnogomet.com
30	4 Jun	H	Segesta	0 – 0	1,000		HRnogomet.com

Source: HRnogomet.com

=== Croatian Cup ===
Round	Date	Venue	Opponent	Score	Attendance	Rijeka Scorers	Report
R1	7 Sep	A	Valpovka	2 – 0	?	Aračić (2)	HRnogomet.com
R1	12 Oct	H	Valpovka	2 – 0	200	Samardžić (2)	HRnogomet.com
R2	26 Oct	A	RNK Split	1 – 0	?	Aračić	HRnogomet.com
R2	30 Nov	H	RNK Split	4 – 0	200	Milinović, Dželalija, Samardžić, Miletić	HRnogomet.com
QF	8 Mar	A	Osijek	0 – 1	6,000		HRnogomet.com
QF	5 Apr	H	Osijek	1 – 0 (2–4 p)	2,500	Samardžić	HRnogomet.com

Source: HRnogomet.com

=== Squad statistics ===
Competitive matches only.
Appearances in brackets indicate numbers of times the player came on as a substitute.

Name	Apps	Goals	Apps	Goals	Apps	Goals
Name	League		Cup		Total	
(Croatia) Mladen Žganjer	26 (0)	0	3 (0)	0	29 (0)	0
(Croatia) Mladen Ivančić	18 (2)	0	4 (0)	0	22 (2)	0
(Croatia) Damir Milinović	20 (1)	1	4 (0)	1	24 (1)	2
(Croatia) Irenko Jurić	23 (0)	0	2 (0)	0	25 (0)	0
(Croatia) Roberto Paliska	15 (0)	0	2 (0)	0	17 (0)	0
(Croatia) Mario Tokić	26 (0)	1	4 (0)	0	30 (0)	1
(Croatia) Elvis Brajković	14 (0)	0	4 (0)	0	18 (0)	0
(Croatia) Alen Horvat	16 (3)	0	2 (0)	0	18 (3)	0
(Croatia) Andrej Živković	19 (5)	3	4 (0)	0	23 (5)	3
(Croatia) Dragan Tadić	22 (7)	2	4 (2)	0	26 (9)	2
(Croatia) Igor Bernobić	13 (6)	0	1 (1)	0	14 (7)	0
(Croatia) Davor Dželalija	24 (3)	7	4 (0)	1	28 (3)	8
(Croatia) Jasmin Samardžić	17 (8)	1	4 (1)	4	21 (9)	5
(Croatia) Borimir Perković	14 (0)	1	1 (0)	0	15 (0)	1
(Bosnia and Herzegovina) Almir Hodžić	12 (1)	3	1 (0)	0	13 (1)	3
(Bosnia and Herzegovina) Senad Brkić	10 (1)	1	0 (1)	0	10 (2)	1
(Croatia) Ilija Aračić	9 (0)	1	3 (0)	3	12 (0)	4
(Bosnia and Herzegovina) Ekrem Bradarić	11 (0)	0	1 (0)	0	12 (0)	0
(Croatia) Dubravko Duda	4 (1)	0	2 (1)	0	6 (2)	0
(Croatia) Vlado Tomljenović	6 (2)	0	1 (1)	0	7 (3)	0
(Croatia) Dean Mladenić	4 (0)	0	2 (0)	0	6 (0)	0
(Bosnia and Herzegovina) Admir Hasančić	0 (6)	0	0 (0)	0	0 (6)	0
(Croatia) Karlo Sotošek	3 (3)	1	0 (1)	0	3 (4)	1
(Croatia) Dragan Raković	2 (2)	0	1 (0)	0	3 (2)	0
(Croatia) Leandar Kelentrić	1 (3)	0	1 (0)	0	2 (3)	0
(Croatia) Krunoslav Pinturić	1 (0)	0	0 (0)	0	1 (0)	0
(Croatia) Vjekoslav Miletić	0 (0)	0	1 (1)	1	1 (1)	1
(Croatia) Goran Vujanović	0 (0)	0	0 (1)	0	0 (1)	0

== See also ==
- 1994–95 Prva HNL
- 1994–95 Croatian Cup
