= Tonči Gulin =

Croatian footballer (1938–1999)

Personal information
- Full name: Tonči Gulin
- Date of birth: 1938
- Place of birth: Split, Kingdom of Yugoslavia
- Date of death: 26 August 1999 (age 60–61)
- Position: Forward

Senior career*
Years	Team	Apps	(Gls)
1957–1963	RNK Split		
1963–1968	Rijeka	77	(30)
1968	Boston Beacons	25	(5)
1969–1970	Rijeka	0	(0)
1970–1971	1. FC Saarbrücken		
- * Club domestic league appearances and goals

Tonči Gulin (1938 — 26 Augustus 1999) was a Croatian football player.

== Club career ==
Born in Split, as a player he spent his early years with RNK Split before moving to HNK Rijeka. He was Split's top scorer during the 1960-61 Yugoslav First League season, and Rijeka's top scorer during the 1964-65 Yugoslav First League season. Later in his career, he had a season each with Boston Beacons in the North American Soccer League and with 1. FC Saarbrücken in Germany.
