= Ivan Medle =

Croatian footballer

Personal information
- Date of birth: 10 February 1932
- Place of birth: Zagreb, Kingdom of Yugoslavia
- Date of death: 4 February 2003 (aged 70)
- Place of death: Vienna, Austria
- Position: Forward

Senior career*
Years	Team	Apps	(Gls)
1951–?	Metalac Zagreb		
- Lokomotiva
1957–1962	Rijeka		(34)
1963–1966	Sturm Graz	51	(37)

International career
1956	PR Croatia	1	(0)
- * Club domestic league appearances and goals

Ivan Medle (10 February 1932 – 4 February 2003) was a Croatian football player.

== Club career ==
Born in Zagreb, he started his career with Metalac, before moving on to Lokomotiva. His next move was to Rijeka, where he is regarded as one of the fastest players of all time. Medle was Rijeka's top scorer during the 1958–59 season, and he scored 34 goals for the club between 1957 and 1962. In 1963 he moved to Austria where he played for Sturm Graz until 1966, when he finished his career.

== International career ==
He had one appearance for the PR Croatia team (against Indonesia) in 1956.

== Personal life ==
=== Death ===
Medle died in Vienna on 4 February 2003.
