= Fuad Šašivarević =

Bosnian footballer (born 1968)

Personal information
- Date of birth: 14 August 1968 (age 58)
- Place of birth: Banja Luka, SFR Yugoslavia
- Height: 1.85 m (6 ft 1 in)
- Position: Midfielder

Youth career
- 1979–1988: Borac Banja Luka

Senior career*
Years	Team	Apps	(Gls)
1988–1992	Borac Banja Luka	48	(4)
1992–1994	Rijeka	51	(6)
1994	Croatia Zagreb	10	(0)
1995–1996	Segesta Sisak	43	(10)
1997–1998	NK Zagreb	23	(2)
1998	KFC Uerdingen 05	13	(2)
1999	NK Zagreb	10	(5)
1999–2001	Jedinstvo Bihać	34	(9)
2001–2003	FK Sarajevo	11	(0)

International career
1996	Bosnia and Herzegovina	1	(0)
- * Club domestic league appearances and goals

Fuad Šašivarević (born 14 August 1968) is a Bosnian former professional footballer.

== Club career ==
Šašivarević started his career in 1988, in the Yugoslav First League club Borac Banja Luka, where he played until 1992. Then he moved to the Croatian club HNK Rijeka from the coastal Adriatic Sea town with same name. In 1994, he moved to Croatia Zagreb (provisory name of Dinamo Zagreb in that period), but stayed there only six months. After playing in Segesta Sisak and NK Zagreb, he moved to Germany in 1998, where he played one season in the 2. Bundesliga club KFC Uerdingen 05, the former Bayer Uerdingen. Before his retirement, he played in his home-country clubs Jedinstvo Bihać and, the FK Sarajevo.

== International career ==
He was part of the Bosnia and Herzegovina national team squad in 1996 in the 1998 FIFA World Cup qualification, but only managed to make one appearance when he came on as a second half substitute for Admir Smajić in a September 1996 qualifier away against Greece.

== Career statistics ==
Season	Club	League	League		Cup		Europe		Total	
Season	Club	League	Apps	Goals	Apps	Goals	Apps	Goals	Apps	Goals
1988–89	Borac Banja Luka	Second League	5	2	–		–		5	2
1989–90	Borac Banja Luka	First League	1	0	–		–		1	0
1990–91	Borac Banja Luka	First League	30	0	–		–		30	0
1991–92	Borac Banja Luka	First League	12	2	–		2	0	14	2
Borac Banja Luka total			48	2	0	0	2	0	50	0
1992–93	Rijeka	First League	21	3	4	1	–		25	4
1993–94	Rijeka	First League	30	3	8	2	–		38	5
Rijeka total			51	6	12	3	0	0	63	9
1994–95	First League	Croatia Zagreb	11	0	5	2	1	0	14	1
1994–95	First League	Segesta	13	2	2	0	–		16	2
1995–96	First League	Segesta	30	8	3	1	–		33	9
1996–97	First League	Segesta	23	4	2	1	8	2	33	7
Segesta total			66	14	7	2	8	2	81	18
1997–98	First League	Zagreb	23	2	5	0	1	0	29	2
1998–99	Uerdingen 05	2. Bundesliga	13	2	–		–		13	2
1998–99	Zagreb	First League	10	5	1	0	–		10	5
Zagreb total			33	7	6	0	0	0	39	7
1999–00	Jedinstvo Bihać	Premier League	–		–		–		0	0
2000–01	Jedinstvo Bihać	Premier League	34	9	–		–		0	0
2001–02	Sarajevo	Premier League	11	0	–		1	0	12	0
2002–03	Sarajevo	Premier League	–		–		–		0	0
Career total			267	40	31	7	13	2	311	49
Stats, stats

== Honours ==
Borac Banja Luka

- Yugoslav Second League promotion: 1988–89
- Mitropa Cup: 1992

HNK Rijeka

- Croatian Cup final: 1993–94

Croatia Zagreb

- Super Cup final: 1994

HNK Segesta

- UEFA Intertoto Cup final: 1996

Sarajevo

- Bosnia and Herzegovina Cup: 2001–02
