= Goran Vujanović =

Croatian footballer

Personal information
- Date of birth: 15 November 1977 (age 48)
- Place of birth: Croatia
- Position: Forward

Senior career*
Years	Team	Apps	(Gls)
1994–1999	Rijeka	0	(0)
1999–2000	Pomorac Kostrena		
2000–2003	Orijent 1919		
2003–2004	Novalja		
2004–2005	Pomorac Kostrena		
2005	DPMM		(17)
2005–2007	LA Croatia		
2007–2008	Puerto Rico Islanders	6	(0)
2009	Imotski		
2010	Pali Blues	1	(0)

International career^{‡}
1993–1994	Croatia U16	2	(0)
1993	Croatia U17	4	(0)
1994	Croatia U18	1	(0)
1994	Croatia U19	2	(0)
1994	Croatia U21	1	(0)
- * Club domestic league appearances and goals as of 11 September 2022 ‡ National team caps and goals as of 11 September 2022

Goran Vujanović (born 15 November 1977 in Croatia) is a Croatian retired footballer.

== Career ==
=== Brunei ===
Completing a hat-trick as DPMM cruised past Bandaran KB 9-0, Vujanovic was considered to be the Wasps mercurial talent at the 2005 ASEAN Club Championship. He struck twice to reach the semifinals where they were eliminated by Pahang FA. However, the Croat's contract was not renewed, with DPMM officials citing underperformance.

=== Puerto Rico ===
He was an import to Puerto Rico Islanders halfway through 2007.
