= Vladimir Lukarić =

Croatian footballer and manager

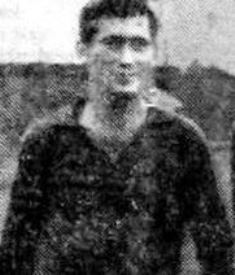
- Vladimir Lukarić in 1961

Personal information
- Full name: Vladimir Lukarić
- Date of birth: 21 January 1939 (age 87)
- Place of birth: Fiume, Kingdom of Italy
- Position: Forward

Youth career
- 1953–1956: NK Željezničar Moravice
- 1956–1958: Crikvenica

Senior career*
Years	Team	Apps	(Gls)
1958–1969	Rijeka	224	(44)
1969–1971	Bellinzona	20	(6)
1971–1972	Rijeka	21	(9)
Total		265	(55)

International career
1961–1965	Yugoslavia	6	(1)

Managerial career
- 1973–1976: Rijeka (Assistant coach)
- 1976–1978: Crikvenica
- 1978–1980: Rijeka (Assistant coach)
- 1980–1985: Rijeka (Youth selections)
- 1980–1989: Rijeka (Assistant coach)
- 1989–1991: Rijeka
- 1990: Croatia (Assistant coach)
- 1992–1993: Rijeka U-21
- 1993–1994: Pomorac Kostrena
- 1995: NK Buje
- 1995–1996: Crikvenica
- 1998: Rijeka (Interim)
- * Club domestic league appearances and goals

Vladimir Lukarić (born 22 January 1939) is a former Croatian football player and manager. He has had six appearances for the Yugoslavia national team, scoring his only goal against Ethiopia in 1962.

== Playing career ==
=== Club ===
Born in Rijeka (back then still named Fiume and part of the Kingdom of Italy) as a player, he was HNK Rijeka's first player to be capped for the Yugoslavia national team in 1961. He spent much of his career in Rijeka, collecting over 200 league caps and scoring 42 goals. He also had a two-year spell with AC Bellinzona in Switzerland before returning to HNK Rijeka as assistant manager.

=== International ===
Lukarić made his first international appearance for Yugoslavia national team in 1961 in a friendly match against Morocco and earned a total of 6 caps, scoring 1 goal. His final international was a September 1965 friendly away against the Soviet Union.

=== International appearances ===
Yugoslavia national team
Year	Apps	Goals
1961	1	0
1962	1	1
1963	0	0
1964	1	0
1965	3	0
Total	6	1

=== International goals ===
Goal	Date	Venue	Opponent	Score	Result	Competition
1	19 September 1962	Karaburma Stadium, Belgrade	Ethiopia	1 – 0	5 – 2	Friendly

== Career statistics ==
=== Player statistics ===
Club performance			League		Cup		Continental		Total	
Season	Club	League	Apps	Goals	Apps	Goals	Apps	Goals	Apps	Goals
Yugoslavia			League		Yugoslav Cup		Europe		Total	
1958-59	NK Rijeka	Yugoslav First League	17	2	2	0	-	-	19	2
1959-60	NK Rijeka	Yugoslav First League	22	8	1	0	-	-	23	8
1960-61	NK Rijeka	Yugoslav First League	17	6	1	1	-	-	5	0
1961-62	NK Rijeka	Yugoslav First League	18	2	1	0	-	-	19	2
1962-63	NK Rijeka	Yugoslav First League	22	4	1	0	-	-	23	4
1962-63	NK Rijeka	Yugoslav First League	22	4	1	0	6	3	29	7
1963-64	NK Rijeka	Yugoslav First League	21	6	1	1	-	-	22	7
1964-65	NK Rijeka	Yugoslav First League	25	5	0	0	-	-	25	5
1965-66	NK Rijeka	Yugoslav First League	15	3	1	2	4	1	20	6
1966-67	NK Rijeka	Yugoslav First League	-	-	-	-	-	-	0	0
1967-68	NK Rijeka	Yugoslav First League	21	4	1	-	-	-	22	4
1968-69	NK Rijeka	Yugoslav First League	24	0	1	1	-	-	26	5
Switzerland			League		Swiss Cup		Europe		Total	
1969-70	AC Bellinzona	Nationalliga A	6	2	0	0	-	-	6	2
1970-71	AC Bellinzona	Nationalliga A	14	4	0	0	-	-	14	4
Yugoslavia			League		Yugoslav Cup		Europe		Total	
1971-72	NK Rijeka	Yugoslav Second League	21	9	1	0	-	-	22	9
Career Total			265	55	12	5	10	4	287	64

== Managerial career ==
As a manager, Lukarić was a coach of all youth levels of Rijeka before becoming their main coach between 1989 and 1991. He also coached other local clubs such as NK Buje, NK Crikvenica and NK Pomorac Kostrena. He was also the assistant manager of the Croatia national team in 1990 in their match against the United States.

=== Managerial statistics ===
Club	From	To	Competition	Record				
Club	From	To	Competition	P	W	D	L	Win %
NK Rijeka	30 July 1989	16 December 1990	First League	52	21	11	20	40.38
NK Rijeka	30 July 1989	16 December 1990	Yugoslav Cup	8	3	2	3	37.50
NK Rijeka Total				60	24	13	23	40.00
HNK Rijeka	3 May 1998	3 May 1998	Prva HNL	1	0	0	1	0.00
Totals				61	24	13	24	39.34

*Dates of first and last games under Lukarić; not dates of official appointments

== Honours ==
=== Player ===
HNK Rijeka

- Yugoslav Second League: 1971-72

=== Individual ===
- HNK Rijeka all time XI by Novi list

=== Manager ===
HNK Rijeka (Youth)

- SR Croatia Youth Cup: 1982
- Yugoslav Youth Cup: 1982
- Croatian Youth Cup: 1992
