= NK Hodošan =

Croatian football club

- Full name: Nogometni klub Hodošan
- Founded: 1965
- Ground: Sportski dom
- Capacity: 1,000
- League: Međimurje County 2nd League
- 2010–11: Međimurje County 3rd League, 1st

NK Hodošan is a Croatian football club based in the village of Hodošan in Donji Kraljevec municipality. Until 2006 club was known as Budućnost and under that name won Croatian third league in season 1996/97.

They finished second in the 1997–98 Croatian second league, but were relegated from the 1998–99 Croatian second division.

Hodošan currently play in the Međimurje County leagues, where they were undefeated in the autumn 2015 league.
