= Elvis Brajković =

Croatian footballer (born 1969)

Personal information
- Full name: Elvis Brajković
- Date of birth: 12 June 1969 (age 57)
- Place of birth: Rijeka, SR Croatia, SFR Yugoslavia
- Height: 1.88 m (6 ft 2 in)
- Position: Defender

Senior career*
Years	Team	Apps	(Gls)
1992–1994	Rijeka	84	(2)
1995–1996	1860 Munich	27	(0)
1996	Rijeka	5	(0)
1997	Hellas Verona	10	(0)
1997–1998	Hajduk Split	30	(2)
1999	Santos Laguna	29	(0)
2000	Atlante	16	(1)
2000–2001	Hapoel Petah Tikva	33	(1)
2001–2002	Rijeka	19	(1)
2002–2004	Pomorac	28	(1)
2004–2005	Šibenik		
2005–2006	Velebit		
2006–2010	Primorac Biograd		

International career
1994–1996	Croatia	8	(2)

Managerial career
- 2010–2012: Rijeka (Sports director)
- 2015: Lošinj
- 2016: Orijent 1919
- 2020-2021: Rudar Labin
- 2021: Pazinka Pazin
- * Club domestic league appearances and goals

Elvis Brajković (born 12 June 1969) is a Croatian retired professional footballer who played as a defender.

== Club career ==
He played for several clubs, including NK Rijeka, TSV 1860 Munich (Germany), Hellas Verona F.C. (Italian Serie A in 1996–97), Hajduk Split, NK Pomorac and HNK Šibenik. He played for the Mexican teams Santos Laguna (Torreón, Coahuila) and Atlante (Mexico City) where he figured two matches as captain in the summer 2000 season. From 2005–06 he played in the Croatian third division for Velebit Benkovac and later for Primorac Biograd, also in third division.

== International career ==
He made his debut for Croatia in an April 1994 friendly match away against Slovakia and earned a total of 8 caps scoring 2 goals. His final international was an April 1996 friendly against Hungary.

Brajković was a participant at the 1996 UEFA European Championship.

== Managerial career ==
In February 2021, Brajković was replaced by Zoran Peruško as manager of Rudar Labin. He was appointed manager of Pazinka Pazin in July 2021, while also being an assistant to Tomislav Rukavina at the U-17 national team.

== Career statistics ==
Appearances and goals by club, season and competition
Club	Season	League			National Cup		League Cup		Continental		Total	
Club	Season	Division	Apps	Goals	Apps	Goals	Apps	Goals	Apps	Goals	Apps	Goals
NK Rijeka	1992	Prva HNL	13	1	3	0	–	–	-	-	16	1
NK Rijeka	1992-93	Prva HNL	27	0	4	0	–	–	-	-	31	0
NK Rijeka	1993-94	Prva HNL	32	1	10	1	–	–	-	-	42	2
NK Rijeka	1994-95	Prva HNL	14	0	4	0	–	–	-	-	18	0
NK Rijeka	Total		86	2	21	1	0	0	0	0	107	3
1860 Munich	1994-95	Bundesliga	9	0	0	0	–	–	-	-	9	0
1860 Munich	1995-96	Bundesliga	18	0	0	0	–	–	-	-	18	0
1860 Munich	Total		27	0	0	0	0	0	0	0	27	0
HNK Rijeka	1996-97	Prva HNL	5	0	0	0	–	–	-	-	5	0
Hellas Verona	1996-97	Serie A	5	0	0	0	–	–	-	-	5	0
Hajduk Split	1997-98	Prva HNL	19	2	4	0	–	–	-	-	23	2
Hajduk Split	1998-99	Prva HNL	11	0	1	0	–	–	4	1	16	1
Hajduk Split	Total		30	2	5	0	0	0	4	1	39	3
Santos Laguna	1999	Liga MX	17	0	-	-	–	–	-	-	17	0
Santos Laguna	2000	Liga MX	6	0	-	-	–	–	-	-	6	0
Santos Laguna	Total		23	0	0	0	0	0	0	0	23	0
Atlante	2000	Liga MX	16	1	-	-	–	–	-	-	16	1
Hapoel Petah Tikva	2000-01	Premier League	33	1	0	0	2	0	1	0	36	1
HNK Rijeka	2001-02	Prva HNL	19	1	3	0	–	–	-	-	22	1
NK Pomorac	2002-03	Prva HNL	28	1	1	0	–	–	-	-	29	0
Career total			257	7	30	1	2	0	5	1	292	9
