= 2024–25 NK Istra 1961 season =

NK Istra 1961
2024–25 season
- Owner: Baskonia - Alavés Group
- Manager: Paolo Tramezzani (until 22 December 2024); Gonzalo García (since 1 January 2025)
- Stadium: Stadion Aldo Drosina
- HNL: 6th
- Croatian Cup: Semi-finals
- Top goalscorer: League: Vinko Rozić (7); All: Vinko Rozić (7)
- Highest home attendance: 7,443 v Hajduk Split (25 August 2024)
- Lowest home attendance: 861 v Slaven Belupo (22 November 2024)
- Average home league attendance: 3,193

The 2024–25 NK Istra 1961 season was the club's 64th season in existence and the 16th consecutive season in the top flight of Croatian football.

== First-team squad ==
As of 23 February 2025

Note: Flags indicate national team as defined under FIFA eligibility rules; some limited exceptions apply. Players may hold more than one non-FIFA nationality.

No.	Pos.	Nation	Player
1	GK	CRO	Franko Kolić
4	DF	AUT	Dario Marešić
5	DF	FIN	Ville Koski
6	MF	ISL	Logi Hrafn Róbertsson
7	MF	CRO	Slavko Blagojević (vice-captain)
8	MF	CRO	Antonio Maurić
9	FW	BIH	Hamza Jaganjac
11	FW	CRO	Mateo Lisica
12	GK	CRO	Marko Juršić
16	DF	CRO	Luka Bogdan
17	DF	CMR	Stephane Keller (on loan from Deportivo Alavés)
18	MF	NGR	Israel Isaac Ayuma
21	GK	CRO	Lovro Majkić (captain)

No.	Pos.	Nation	Player
22	FW	ISL	Danijel Djuric
23	DF	CRO	Moris Valinčić
24	FW	BIH	Vinko Rozić
26	DF	GER	Marcel Heister
27	MF	CRO	Ivan Ćalušić
29	FW	GEO	Giorgi Gagua
30	MF	CRO	Josip Radošević
36	MF	BIH	Irfan Ramić
38	DF	CRO	Raul Kumar
44	MF	BIH	Stjepan Lončar
57	FW	CRO	Kristian Fućak
70	FW	NGR	Salim Fago Lawal
97	DF	BIH	Advan Kadušić

== Transfers ==
=== In ===
Pos	Player	Transferred from	Fee	Date	Source
GK	(Croatia) Carlo Jurak	(Croatia) Uljanik	Back from loan	15 June 2023	
DF	(Croatia) Luka Bradarić	(Croatia) Dugopolje	Back from loan	15 June 2023	
MF	(Croatia) Tomislav Duvnjak	(Croatia) Sesvete	Back from loan	15 June 2023	
MF	(Slovakia) Sebastian Nebyla	(Czech Republic) Jablonec	Back from loan	26 June 2024	
FW	(Bosnia and Herzegovina) Hamza Jaganjac	(Turkey) Adana Demirspor	Free	1 July 2024	
FW	(Georgia (country)) Giorgi Gagua	(Spain) Deportivo Alavés B	Free	11 July 2024	
DF	(Venezuela) Andrés Ferro	(Venezuela) Metropolitanos	Undisclosed	12 July 2024	
DF	(Cameroon) Stephane Keller	(Spain) Deportivo Alavés	Loan	22 July 2024	
MF	(Mauritania) Beyatt Lekweiry	(Mauritania) AS Douanes	Free	1 August 2024	
DF	(Germany) Marcel Heister	(Bulgaria) Ludogorets Razgrad	Free	9 August 2024	
DF	(Croatia) Luka Bogdan	(Italy) Ternana	Free	24 September 2024	
MF	(Gabon) André Biyogo Poko	No team	Free	10 October 2024	
MF	(Iceland) Logi Hrafn Róbertsson	(Iceland) FH	Free	22 December 2024	
FW	(Bosnia and Herzegovina) Vinko Rozić	(Bosnia and Herzegovina) Posušje	Free	3 January 2025	
FW	(New Zealand) Stipe Ukich	(New Zealand) Auckland City	Free	3 January 2025	
FW	(Croatia) Kristian Fućak	(Croatia) Osijek	Free	15 January 2025	
GK	(Croatia) Marko Juršić	(Croatia) Rovinj	Back from loan	18 January 2025	
GK	(Croatia) Franko Kolić	(Slovenia) Mura	Free	20 January 2025	
MF	(Croatia) Josip Radošević	(Denmark) Brøndby	€50,000	30 January 2025	
MF	(Bosnia and Herzegovina) Stjepan Lončar	(Poland) Lech Poznań	Free	3 February 2025	
FW	(Nigeria) Charles Agada	(Nigeria) Mavlon	Undisclosed	16 February 2025	
FW	(Iceland) Danijel Djuric	(Iceland) Víkingur Reykjavík	€200,000	17 February 2025	

Source: Glasilo Hrvatskog nogometnog saveza

=== Out ===
Pos	Player	Transferred to	Fee	Date	Source
FW	(Venezuela) Darwin Matheus	Unattached	Free	11 June 2024	
MF	(Croatia) Frano Mlinar	(Bosnia and Herzegovina) Zrinjski Mostar	Free	12 June 2024	
MF	(Croatia) Marko Cukon	(Slovenia) Radomlje	Free	25 June 2024	
MF	(Slovakia) Sebastian Nebyla	(Czech Republic) Jablonec	Undisclosed	26 June 2024	
FW	(Bosnia and Herzegovina) Hamza Jaganjac	(Turkey) Adana Demirspor	Back from loan	29 June 2024	
GK	(Croatia) Marino Bulat	Unattached	Free	29 June 2024	
DF	(Croatia) Luka Bradarić	Unattached	Free	29 June 2024	
DF	(Croatia) Ante Majstorović	(Croatia) Rijeka	Free	29 June 2024	
DF	(Serbia) Mladen Devetak	(Italy) Palermo	Back from loan	30 June 2024	
FW	(Sweden) Emmanuel Ekong	(Italy) Empoli	Back from loan	30 June 2024	
DF	(Croatia) Luka Hujber	(Denmark) Vejle	Undisclosed	8 July 2024	
FW	(Croatia) Tomislav Glavan	(Croatia) Opatija	Free	18 July 2024	
MF	(Croatia) Tomislav Duvnjak	(Croatia) Varaždin	Free	23 July 2024	
GK	(Croatia) Carlo Jurak	(Croatia) Uljanik	Dual registration	19 August 2024	
DF	(Canada) Jovan Ivanišević	(Croatia) Uljanik	Dual registration	19 August 2024	
DF	(Croatia) Raul Kumar	(Croatia) Uljanik	Dual registration	19 August 2024	
MF	(Croatia) Dukan Ahmeti	(Croatia) Uljanik	Dual registration	19 August 2024	
MF	(Croatia) Marin Žgomba	(Croatia) Uljanik	Dual registration	19 August 2024	
FW	(Croatia) Lorenzo Travaglia	(Croatia) Uljanik	Dual registration	19 August 2024	
GK	(Croatia) Marko Juršić	(Croatia) Rovinj	Loan	23 August 2024	
DF	(Netherlands) Terrence Douglas	(Netherlands) Eindhoven	Undisclosed	29 August 2024	
MF	(Ukraine) Oleksandr Petrusenko	(Turkey) Antalyaspor	€500,000	16 September 2024	
DF	(Venezuela) Andrés Ferro	(Venezuela) Metropolitanos	Free	31 December 2024	
GK	(Croatia) Marijan Ćorić	(Kosovo) Llapi	Free	8 January 2025	
FW	(France) Elias Filet	(Switzerland) Aarau	Free	17 January 2025	
DF	(Canada) Jovan Ivanišević	(Italy) Bologna	Loan	21 January 2025	
MF	(Croatia) Matej Vuk	(Croatia) Varaždin	Free	26 January 2025	
DF	(Moldova) Iurie Iovu	(Spain) Deportivo Alavés B	Loan	31 January 2025	
MF	(Gabon) André Biyogo Poko	(Turkey) Amedspor	€100,000	3 February 2025	
MF	(Mauritania) Beyatt Lekweiry	(Switzerland) Lausanne-Sport	€2,000,000	7 February 2025	
MF	(Croatia) Mario Čuić	Unattached	Free	10 February 2025	
GK	(Croatia) Carlo Jurak	(Croatia) Uljanik	Loan	17 February 2025	
GK	(Croatia) Jan Paus-Kunšt	(Croatia) Uljanik	Dual registration	17 February 2025	
FW	(Nigeria) Charles Agada	(Croatia) Uljanik	Dual registration	17 February 2025	

Source: Glasilo Hrvatskog nogometnog saveza

Total spending: ▼€250,000

Total income: ▲€2,600,000

Total expenditure: ▲€2,350,000

== Competitions ==
=== Overview ===
Competition	First match	Last match	Starting round	Final position	Record							
Competition	First match	Last match	Starting round	Final position	Pld	W	D	L	GF	GA	GD	Win %
SuperSport HNL	2 August 2024	25 May 2025	Matchday 1	6th	36	11	15	10	39	42	−3	30.56
Croatian Cup	10 September 2024	2 April 2025	First round	Semi-finals	4	3	0	1	7	2	+5	75.00
Total					40	14	15	11	46	44	+2	35.00

Last updated: 12 July 2025
Source: Soccerway

=== Croatian Football League ===
==== League table ====
Pos	Team	Pld	W	D	L	GF	GA	GD	Pts	Qualification or relegation (Note: The 2024–25 Croatian Football Cup winners qualify for the Europa League first qualifying round (or the second-placed team if the Croatian Cup winners finish first). If the Croatian Cup winners finish in the top three, the second Conference League second qualifying round spot will be passed to the fourth-placed team.)
4	Varaždin	36	11	16	9	28	24	+4	49	Qualification to Conference League second qualifying round
5	Slaven Belupo	36	13	9	14	42	45	−3	48	
6	Istra 1961	36	11	15	10	39	42	−3	48	
7	Osijek	36	11	9	16	46	52	−6	42	
8	Lokomotiva	36	10	9	17	45	54	−9	39	

Source: SuperSport HNL
Rules for classification: 1) Points; 2) Head-to-head points; 3) Head-to-head goal difference; 4) Head-to-head goals scored (at home if two teams tied); 5) Goal difference; 6) Goals scored; 7) Play-off
(Note: Criteria 2-4 and 7 is only used if deciding champion, teams to international competition or teams for relegation and in that case criteria 6 will not be used).

==== Results summary ====
Overall								Home						Away					
Pld	W	D	L	GF	GA	GD	Pts	W	D	L	GF	GA	GD	W	D	L	GF	GA	GD
36	11	15	10	39	42	−3	48	7	8	3	27	19	+8	4	7	7	12	23	−11

Last updated: 12 July 2025.
Source: SuperSport HNL

==== Results by round ====
Round	1	2	3	4	5	6	7	8	9	10	11	12	13	14	15	16	17	18	19	20	21	22	23	24	25	26	27	28	29	30	31	32	33	34	35	36
Ground	A	H	A	H	A	H	A	A	H	H	A	H	A	H	A	H	H	A	A	H	A	H	A	H	A	A	H	H	A	H	A	H	A	H	H	A
Result	L	W	L	D	W	L	L	D	W	D	L	L	D	L	W	D	D	D	L	D	W	D	D	W	D	L	W	W	L	W	W	D	D	D	W	D
Position	10	5	5	6	6	6	7	8	6	6	7	6	6	9	7	7	7	8	8	8	7	8	8	8	8	8	7	6	6	6	6	6	6	6	6	6

Updated to match(es) played on 12 July 2025. Source: SuperSport HNL
A = Away; H = Home; W = Win; D = Draw; L = Loss

==== Matches ====
2 August 2024 1	Dinamo Zagreb	5–0	Istra 1961	Zagreb
21:00 CEST (UTC+02:00)	Hoxha 13'; Théophile-Catherine 19'; Kulenović 28', 49'; Pierre-Gabriel 79'	Report	Blagojević (yellow card) 28'; Kadušić (yellow card) 40'	Stadium: Stadion Maksimir; Attendance: 6,057; Referee: Mario Zebec

10 August 2024 2	Istra 1961	2–1	Gorica	Pula
21:00 CEST (UTC+02:00)	Kadušić (yellow card) 38'; Marešić 71' (pen.) (yellow card) 90+5'; Iovu (yellow card) 83'; Petrusenko 89'	Report	Štiglec (yellow card) 44'; Čaić (yellow card) 77'; Kolar 84'	Stadium: Stadion Aldo Drosina; Attendance: 2,069; Referee: Ante Terzić

18 August 2024 3	Rijeka	4–0	Istra 1961	Rijeka
21:00 CEST (UTC+02:00)	Rukavina 19'; Pašalić 24'; Ivanović 28', 66'	Report	Iovu (yellow card) 15'; Lekweiry (yellow card) 45+2'; Marešić (yellow card) 47'; Majkić (yellow card) 52'; Keller (yellow card) 68'; Čuić (yellow card) 90+3'	Stadium: Stadion Rujevica; Attendance: 4,159; Referee: Toni Dadić

25 August 2024 4	Istra 1961	1–1	Hajduk Split	Pula
18:15 CEST (UTC+02:00)	Heister 1'; Ivanišević (yellow card) 37'; Petrusenko (yellow card) 73'	Report	Livaja 60'; Uremović (yellow card) 90+2'	Stadium: Stadion Aldo Drosina; Attendance: 7,443; Referee: Tihomir Pejin

31 August 2024 5	Slaven Belupo	0–1	Istra 1961	Koprivnica
18:15 CEST (UTC+02:00)	Čović (yellow card) 82'	Report	Čuić 30'; Blagojević (yellow card) 49'; Gagua (yellow card) 70'; Heister (yellow card) 81'	Stadium: Gradski stadion Attendance: 547; Referee: Dario Bel

14 September 2024 6	Istra 1961	0–2	Lokomotiva	Pula
17:30 CEST (UTC+02:00)	Maurić (yellow card) 39'; Majkić (yellow card) 85'	Report	Fetai (yellow card) 12'; Goričan 28', 86'; Vrbančić (yellow card) 66'	Stadium: Stadion Aldo Drosina; Attendance: 1,525; Referee: Ante Terzić

20 September 2024 7	Varaždin	1–0	Istra 1961	Varaždin
18:00 CEST (UTC+02:00)	Nekić (yellow card) 3'; Boršić (yellow card) 77'; Belcar 78'; Poldrugač (yellow card) 85'	Report	Kadušić (yellow card) 33'; Ćalušić (yellow card) 90+2'	Stadium: Stadion Varteks; Attendance: 1,077; Referee: Mateo Erceg

27 September 2024 8	Šibenik	0–0	Istra 1961	Šibenik
18:00 CEST (UTC+02:00)	Santini (yellow card) 86'; Agyemang (yellow card) 90+1'	Report	Blagojević (yellow card) 15' (yellow-red card) 39'; Vuk (yellow card) 71'; Valinčić (yellow card) 88'; Koski (yellow card) 90+3'	Stadium: Stadion Šubićevac; Attendance: 2,004; Referee: Tihomir Pejin

4 October 2024 9	Istra 1961	2–1	Osijek	Pula
18:00 CEST (UTC+02:00)	Jelenić 12', 22' (o.g.); Marešić (yellow card) 58'; Lekweiry (yellow card) 62'	Report	Pušić (yellow card) 34'; Bukvić (yellow card) 58'; Soldo 88'	Stadium: Stadion Aldo Drosina; Attendance: 1,174; Referee: Mateo Erceg

19 October 2024 10	Istra 1961	2–2	Dinamo Zagreb	Pula
18:30 CEST (UTC+02:00)	Blagojević (yellow card) 25'; Valinčić (yellow card) 25'; Keller (yellow card) 30' (yellow-red card) 60'; Lisica 43'; Heister (yellow card) 51'; Lekweiry 53'; Koski (yellow card) 79'	Report	Ademi 52'; Torrente (yellow card) 56'; Ristovski (yellow card) 63'; Mišić (yellow card) 70'; Kulenović 80' (pen.)	Stadium: Stadion Aldo Drosina; Attendance: 3,287; Referee: Dario Bel

27 October 2024 11	Gorica	1–0	Istra 1961	Velika Gorica
18:30 CET (UTC+01:00)	Kapulica (yellow card) 55'; Leš (yellow card) 62'; Šlogar 84'	Report	Lekweiry (yellow card) 40'; Marešić (yellow card) 83'	Stadium: Stadion Radnik; Attendance: 813; Referee: Ante Čulina

3 November 2024 12	Istra 1961	0–1	Rijeka	Pula
15:00 CET (UTC+01:00)	Kadušić (yellow card) 27'; Lawal (yellow card) 40'; Valinčić (yellow card) 86'	Report	Rukavina (yellow card) 16'; Smolčić (yellow card) 29'; Janković (yellow card) 35'; Devetak (yellow card) 45'; Pašalić (yellow card) 54'; Fruk 77'; Butić (yellow card) 90+1'	Stadium: Stadion Aldo Drosina; Attendance: 3,569; Referee: Mateo Erceg

9 November 2024 13	Hajduk Split	1–1	Istra 1961	Split
17:30 CET (UTC+01:00)	Benrahou 85'	Report	Biyogo Poko (yellow card) 36'; Lisica 67'; Lekweiry (yellow card) 73'; Čuić (yellow card) 81'	Stadium: Stadion Poljud; Attendance: 18,720; Referee: Toni Dadić

22 November 2024 14	Istra 1961	2–3	Slaven Belupo	Pula
18:00 CET (UTC+01:00)	Lisica 25'; Iovu (yellow card) 37'; Marešić (yellow card) 58'; Gagua (yellow card) 67' (goal) 78'	Report	Lepinjica 38'; Ćubelić (yellow card) 56'; Boras 70'; Šuto 89' (yellow card) 90'	Stadium: Stadion Aldo Drosina; Attendance: 861; Referee: Ante Terzić

1 December 2024 15	Lokomotiva	1–2	Istra 1961	Zagreb
15:00 CET (UTC+01:00)	Dajčer (yellow card) 50'; Smakaj (yellow card) 76'; Mudražija 83'	Report	Marešić 3' (yellow card) 47'; Lawal 45+1'; Blagojević (yellow card) 50'; Gagua (yellow card) 63'; Bogdan (yellow card) 74'; Heister (yellow card) 83'	Stadium: Stadion Kranjčevićeva; Attendance: 291; Referee: Tihomir Pejin

7 December 2024 16	Istra 1961	0–0	Varaždin	Pula
15:00 CET (UTC+01:00)	Kadušić (yellow card) 36'; Keller (yellow card) 76'	Report	Mitrovski (yellow card) 40'; Nekić (yellow card) 63'	Stadium: Stadion Aldo Drosina; Attendance: 1,019; Referee: Ante Čulina

14 December 2024 17	Istra 1961	3–3	Šibenik	Pula
17:30 CET (UTC+01:00)	Lekweiry 7'; Blagojević (yellow card) 10'; Santini 58' (o.g.); Koski (yellow card) 67'; Marešić (yellow card) 74'; Lawal 85'; Kadušić (red card) 90+1'	Report	Prekodravac (yellow card) 3'; Pozo (yellow card) 18'; Gržan 20' (yellow card) 32'; Perić 29'; Mišević (yellow card) 45+1'; Božić (yellow card) 78'; Kulušić 90+4'	Stadium: Stadion Aldo Drosina; Attendance: 943; Referee: Zdenko Lovrić

20 December 2024 18	Osijek	2–2	Istra 1961	Osijek
18:00 CET (UTC+01:00)	Jugović (yellow card) 54'; Živković 64'; Lima 66'; Tuia (yellow card) 75'	Report	Lekweiry 38'; Gagua 59'; Valinčić (yellow card) 88'	Stadium: Opus Arena; Attendance: 3,889; Referee: Antonio Melnjak

25 January 2025 19	Dinamo Zagreb	3–1	Istra 1961	Zagreb
17:30 CET (UTC+01:00)	Kulenović 21'; Baturina 49'; Franjić (yellow card) 55'; Stojković 61'	Report	Rozić 26'; Keller (yellow card) 51'; Blagojević (yellow card) 58'; Fućak (yellow card) 79'	Stadium: Stadion Maksimir; Attendance: 9,150; Referee: Patrik Kolarić

31 January 2025 20	Istra 1961	0–0	Gorica	Pula
17:00 CET (UTC+01:00)		Report		Stadium: Stadion Aldo Drosina; Attendance: 1,068; Referee: Mario Zebec

9 February 2025 21	Rijeka	0–1	Istra 1961	Rijeka
15:00 CET (UTC+01:00)	Goda (yellow card) 46'; Djouahra (yellow card) 71'	Report	Gagua 38'; Koski (yellow card) 52'; Fućak (yellow card) 56'; Keller (yellow card) 69'; Lončar (yellow card) 90+2'	Stadium: Stadion Rujevica; Attendance: 4,893; Referee: Oliver Romić

15 February 2025 22	Istra 1961	1–1	Hajduk Split	Pula
15:00 CET (UTC+01:00)	Rozić 13' (yellow card) 79'; Heister (yellow card) 18'; Maurić (yellow card) 56'; Bogdan (yellow card) 57'; Marešić (yellow card) 74'	Report	Sanyang 29'; Sigur (yellow card) 56'; Uremović (yellow card) 72'	Stadium: Stadion Aldo Drosina; Attendance: 7,010; Referee: Igor Pajač

23 February 2025 23	Slaven Belupo	0–0	Istra 1961	Koprivnica
17:30 CET (UTC+01:00)	Božić (yellow card) 74'; Nestorovski (yellow card) 84'	Report	Rozić (yellow card) 20'; Gagua (yellow card) 44'; Radošević (yellow card) 44' (yellow-red card) 66'; Heister (yellow card) 59'; Valinčić (yellow card) 76'	Stadium: Gradski stadion Attendance: 977; Referee: Antonio Melnjak

28 February 2025 24	Istra 1961	3–2	Lokomotiva	Pula
18:00 CET (UTC+01:00)	Fućak 18'; Lončar 26'; Maurić (yellow card) 28'; Lisica 42'	Report	Mudražija 16' (pen.), 58'; Sigali (yellow card) 36'; Fetai (yellow card) 37'; Vuković (yellow card) 55'; Kolinger (yellow card) 60'	Stadium: Stadion Aldo Drosina; Attendance: 1,271; Referee: Zdenko Lovrić

8 March 2025 25	Varaždin	0–0	Istra 1961	Varaždin
15:00 CET (UTC+01:00)	Ba (yellow card) 36'; Duvnjak (yellow card) 64'; Sierra (yellow card) 76'	Report	Heister (yellow card) 38'; Lawal (yellow card) 59'; Jaganjac (yellow card) 82'	Stadium: Stadion Varteks; Attendance: 1,086; Referee: Ante Terzić

15 March 2025 26	Šibenik	1–0	Istra 1961	Šibenik
15:00 CET (UTC+01:00)	Kavelj 17'; Santini (yellow card) 24'; Božić (yellow card) 62'	Report		Stadium: Stadion Šubićevac; Attendance: 712; Referee: Tihomir Pejin

29 March 2025 27	Istra 1961	2–1	Osijek	Pula
16:00 CET (UTC+01:00)	Lawal 45'; Heister (yellow card) 87'; Rozić 90+3'; Maurić (yellow card) 90+7'	Report	Cvijanović (yellow card) 14'; Mersinaj (yellow card) 27'; Ohajunwa (yellow card) 45+2'; Fortes 68'; Ademi (yellow card) 90+4'; Mikolčić (yellow card) 90+4'; Pušić (yellow card) 90+2' (yellow-red card) 90+7'	Stadium: Stadion Aldo Drosina; Attendance: 1,620; Referee: Duje Strukan

5 April 2025 28	Istra 1961	3–0	Dinamo Zagreb	Pula
18:45 CEST (UTC+02:00)	Lončar 22'; Torrente 53' (o.g.); Gagua (yellow card) 55'; Lawal 68'; Kadušić (yellow card) 84'	Report	Stojković (yellow card) 29'; Mišić (yellow card) 40'; Pierre-Gabriel (yellow card) 70'	Stadium: Stadion Aldo Drosina; Attendance: 4,685; Referee: Mateo Erceg

12 April 2025 29	Gorica	3–2	Istra 1961	Velika Gorica
16:00 CEST (UTC+02:00)	Šlogar 19'; Sikošek (yellow card) 26'; Čuić 31'; Halilović (yellow card) 46'; Kolar 81'	Report	Lončar 13'; Valinčić 17'; Heister (yellow card) 53' (yellow-red card) 84'	Stadium: Stadion Radnik; Attendance: 610; Referee: Tihomir Pejin

19 April 2025 30	Istra 1961	2–0	Rijeka	Pula
18:45 CEST (UTC+02:00)	Lawal 28'; Rozić 70'	Report	Gojak (yellow card) 22'; Janković (yellow card) 67'; Majstorović (yellow card) 79'; Oreč (yellow card) 84'	Stadium: Stadion Aldo Drosina; Attendance: 6,088; Referee: Dario Bel

23 April 2025 31	Hajduk Split	0–1	Istra 1961	Split
17:30 CEST (UTC+02:00)	Prpić (yellow card) 25'; Pukštas (yellow card) 54'; Brajković (yellow card) 57'	Report	Rozić 35'	Stadium: Stadion Poljud; Attendance: 23,163; Referee: Mateo Erceg (Benkovac)

28 April 2025 32	Istra 1961	1–1	Slaven Belupo	Pula
17:00 CEST (UTC+02:00)	Lončar 22'	Report	Nestorovski 29'; Grgić (yellow card) 50'; Agbekpornu (yellow card) 77'; Lučić (yellow card) 84'	Stadium: Stadion Aldo Drosina; Attendance: 5,054; Referee: Patrik Pavlešić

3 May 2025 33	Lokomotiva	0–0	Istra 1961	Zagreb
18:45 CEST (UTC+02:00)	Karačić (yellow card) 74'; Fetai (yellow card) 77'	Report	Lončar (yellow card) 20' (yellow-red card) 43'; Marešić (yellow card) 86'	Stadium: Stadion Maksimir; Attendance: 340; Referee: Antonio Melnjak

11 May 2025 34	Istra 1961	0–0	Varaždin	Pula
18:15 CEST (UTC+02:00)	Radošević (yellow card) 34'; Koski (yellow card) 71'; Heister (yellow card) 88'	Report	Ba (yellow card) 42'; Marina (yellow card) 45'; Duvnjak (yellow card) 68'	Stadium: Stadion Aldo Drosina; Attendance: 4,743; Referee: Mateo Erceg

16 May 2025 35	Istra 1961	3–0	Šibenik	Pula
18:00 CEST (UTC+02:00)	Rozić 2', 4'; Lončar 72'	Report	Roca (yellow card) 75'; Agyemang (yellow card) 89'	Stadium: Stadion Aldo Drosina; Attendance: 4,051; Referee: Tihomir Pejin

25 May 2025 36	Osijek	1–1	Istra 1961	Osijek
17:00 CEST (UTC+02:00)	Fortes 55'; Farkaš (yellow card) 65'	Report	Marešić 37' (pen.); Keller (yellow card) 80'; Blagojević (yellow card) 90+2'	Stadium: Opus Arena; Attendance: 4,024; Referee: Ante Terzić

=== Croatian Football Cup ===
10 September 2024 R1	Tomislav	0–2	Istra 1961	Donji Andrijevci
16:30 CEST (UTC+02:00)	Balentović (yellow card) 26'; Kokotović (yellow card) 45+2' (red card) 73'; Galović (yellow card) 69'; Trepšić (yellow card) 78'	Report	Lisica (yellow card) 45+2'; Vuk (yellow card) 48'; Marešić 70' (pen.); Filet (yellow card) 78'; Ivanišević (yellow card) 80'; Čuić 81'	Stadium: Tomislav Buhač; Attendance: 850; Referee: Antonio Škobić

30 October 2024 R2	Rudeš	1–2	Istra 1961	Zagreb
14:00 CET (UTC+01:00)	Srbljinović 54'; Batarelo (yellow card) 65'; Maružin (yellow card) 69'; Baltić (yellow card) 86'	Report	Gagua (yellow card) 22'; Lekweiry 23'; Bogdan (yellow card) 55' (goal) 60'; Valinčić (yellow card) 65'; Keller (yellow card) 90+1'	Stadium: ŠC Rudeš; Attendance: 300; Referee: Ante Terzić

4 March 2025 QF	Istra 1961	3–0	Lokomotiva	Pula
17:00 CET (UTC+01:00)	Lawal 2'; Maurić 12'; Valinčić (yellow card) 42'; Lisica 45+1'; Heister (yellow card) 64'; Koski (yellow card) 84'	Report	Leovac (yellow card) 23'; Karačić (yellow card) 39'; Fetai (yellow card) 61'; Katić (yellow card) 76'; Goričan (yellow card) 84'	Stadium: Stadion Aldo Drosina; Attendance: 1,444; Referee: Patrik Kolarić

2 April 2025 SF	Rijeka	1–0	Istra 1961	Rijeka
20:00 CEST (UTC+02:00)	Radeljić (yellow card) 20'; Devetak (yellow card) 30'; Menalo (yellow card) 50'; Fruk 86'	Report	Valinčić (yellow card) 30'; Maurić (yellow card) 42'; Radošević (yellow card) 56'; Heister (yellow card) 90+2'	Stadium: Stadion Rujevica; Attendance: 6,109; Referee: Igor Pajač

== Player seasonal records ==
Updated 12 July 2025

=== Goals ===
Rank	Name	League	Cup	Total
1	(Bosnia and Herzegovina) Vinko Rozić	7	–	7
2	(Nigeria) Salim Fago Lawal	5	1	6
3	(Bosnia and Herzegovina) Stjepan Lončar	5	–	5
3	(Croatia) Mateo Lisica	4	1	5
5	(Mauritania) Beyatt Lekweiry	3	1	4
5	(Austria) Dario Marešić	3	1	4
7	(Georgia (country)) Giorgi Gagua	3	–	3
8	(Croatia) Mario Čuić	1	1	2
9	(Croatia) Kristian Fućak	1	–	1
9	(Germany) Marcel Heister	1	–	1
9	(Ukraine) Oleksandr Petrusenko	1	–	1
9	(Croatia) Moris Valinčić	1	–	1
9	(Croatia) Luka Bogdan	–	1	1
9	(Croatia) Antonio Maurić	–	1	1
Own goals		4	–	4
TOTALS		39	7	46

Source: Competitive matches

=== Clean sheets ===
Rank	Name	League	Cup	Total
1	(Croatia) Lovro Majkić	12	1	13
2	(Croatia) Marijan Ćorić	1	1	2
3	(Croatia) Franko Kolić	1	–	1
TOTALS		14	2	16

Source: Competitive matches

=== Disciplinary record ===
Number	Position	Player	HNL			Croatian Cup			Total		
Number	Position	Player	Yellow card	(yellow card) (yellow-red card)	Red card	Yellow card	(yellow card) (yellow-red card)	Red card	Yellow card	(yellow card) (yellow-red card)	Red card
4	DF	(Austria) Dario Marešić	9	0	0	0	0	0	9	0	0
5	DF	(Finland) Ville Koski	5	0	0	1	0	0	6	0	0
6	MF	(Ukraine) Oleksandr Petrusenko	1	0	0	0	0	0	1	0	0
7	MF	(Croatia) Slavko Blagojević	7	1	0	0	0	0	7	1	0
8	MF	(Croatia) Antonio Maurić	4	0	0	1	0	0	5	0	0
9	FW	(Bosnia and Herzegovina) Hamza Jaganjac	1	0	0	0	0	0	1	0	0
11	MF	(Croatia) Mateo Lisica	0	0	0	1	0	0	1	0	0
15	DF	(Canada) Jovan Ivanišević	1	0	0	1	0	0	2	0	0
16	DF	(Croatia) Luka Bogdan	2	0	0	1	0	0	3	0	0
17	DF	(Cameroon) Stephane Keller	5	1	0	1	0	0	6	1	0
20	DF	(Moldova) Iurie Iovu	3	0	0	0	0	0	3	0	0
21	GK	(Croatia) Lovro Majkić	2	0	0	0	0	0	2	0	0
22	MF	(Croatia) Matej Vuk	1	0	0	1	0	0	2	0	0
23	DF	(Croatia) Moris Valinčić	5	0	0	3	0	0	8	0	0
24	FW	(Bosnia and Herzegovina) Vinko Rozić	2	0	0	0	0	0	2	0	0
26	DF	(Germany) Marcel Heister	8	1	0	2	0	0	10	1	0
27	MF	(Croatia) Ivan Ćalušić	1	0	0	0	0	0	1	0	0
29	FW	(Georgia (country)) Giorgi Gagua	5	0	0	1	0	0	6	0	0
30	MF	(Croatia) Josip Radošević	1	1	0	1	0	0	2	1	0
31	MF	(Mauritania) Beyatt Lekweiry	4	0	0	0	0	0	4	0	0
44	MF	(Bosnia and Herzegovina) Stjepan Lončar	1	1	0	0	0	0	1	1	0
57	FW	(Croatia) Kristian Fućak	2	0	0	0	0	0	2	0	0
70	FW	(Nigeria) Salim Fago Lawal	2	0	0	0	0	0	2	0	0
71	MF	(Gabon) André Biyogo Poko	1	0	0	0	0	0	1	0	0
75	FW	(France) Elias Filet	0	0	0	1	0	0	1	0	0
77	MF	(Croatia) Mario Čuić	2	0	0	0	0	0	2	0	0
97	DF	(Bosnia and Herzegovina) Advan Kadušić	6	0	1	0	0	0	6	0	1
TOTALS			81	5	1	15	0	0	96	5	1

=== Appearances and goals ===
Number	Position	Player	Apps	Goals	Apps	Goals	Apps	Goals
Number	Position	Player	Total		HNL (Note: First number represents appearances in starting eleven, while the second number indicates a substitute appearance.)		Croatian Cup	
1	GK	(Croatia) Marijan Ćorić	7	0	5+0	0	2+0	0
1	GK	(Croatia) Franko Kolić	1	0	0+1	0	0+0	0
4	DF	(Austria) Dario Marešić	36	4	33+0	3	3+0	1
5	DF	(Finland) Ville Koski	37	0	33+1	0	1+2	0
6	MF	(Ukraine) Oleksandr Petrusenko	6	1	4+1	1	1+0	0
6	MF	(Iceland) Logi Hrafn Róbertsson	6	0	2+4	0	0+0	0
7	MF	(Croatia) Slavko Blagojević	16	0	14+2	0	0+0	0
8	MF	(Croatia) Antonio Maurić	30	1	21+5	0	4+0	1
9	FW	(Bosnia and Herzegovina) Hamza Jaganjac	11	0	3+7	0	0+1	0
11	MF	(Croatia) Mateo Lisica	39	5	30+6	4	3+0	1
15	DF	(Canada) Jovan Ivanišević	8	0	4+3	0	1+0	0
16	DF	(Croatia) Luka Bogdan	10	1	5+3	0	2+0	1
17	DF	(Cameroon) Stephane Keller	16	0	7+8	0	1+0	0
18	MF	(Nigeria) Israel Isaac Ayuma	1	0	0+1	0	0+0	0
20	DF	(Moldova) Iurie Iovu	16	0	11+3	0	2+0	0
21	GK	(Croatia) Lovro Majkić	33	0	31+0	0	2+0	0
22	FW	(Iceland) Danijel Djuric	9	0	0+7	0	0+2	0
22	MF	(Croatia) Matej Vuk	9	0	6+2	0	1+0	0
23	DF	(Croatia) Moris Valinčić	37	1	28+5	1	3+1	0
24	FW	(Bosnia and Herzegovina) Vinko Rozić	19	7	13+4	7	0+2	0
26	DF	(Germany) Marcel Heister	33	1	22+7	1	3+1	0
27	MF	(Croatia) Ivan Ćalušić	22	0	9+12	0	0+1	0
29	FW	(Georgia (country)) Giorgi Gagua	30	3	16+12	3	2+0	0
30	MF	(Croatia) Josip Radošević	17	0	14+1	0	2+0	0
31	MF	(Mauritania) Beyatt Lekweiry	17	4	12+4	3	1+0	1
36	MF	(Bosnia and Herzegovina) Irfan Ramić	6	0	1+4	0	1+0	0
44	DF	(Venezuela) Andrés Ferro	2	0	0+2	0	0+0	0
44	MF	(Bosnia and Herzegovina) Stjepan Lončar	16	5	13+1	5	2+0	0
57	FW	(Croatia) Kristian Fućak	18	1	5+11	1	1+1	0
70	FW	(Nigeria) Salim Fago Lawal	31	6	23+6	5	2+0	1
71	MF	(Gabon) André Biyogo Poko	8	0	3+4	0	1+0	0
75	FW	(France) Elias Filet	12	0	3+7	0	2+0	0
77	MF	(Croatia) Mario Čuić	8	2	1+6	1	0+1	1
97	DF	(Bosnia and Herzegovina) Advan Kadušić	34	0	24+7	0	1+2	0
