= List of Croatian football transfers winter 2024–25 =

This is a list of Croatian football transfers for the 2024–25 winter transfer window. Only transfers featuring Croatian Football League are listed.

== Croatian Football League ==
Note: Flags indicate national team as has been defined under FIFA eligibility rules. Players may hold more than one non-FIFA nationality.

=== Dinamo Zagreb ===
In:

No.	Pos.	Nation	Player
15	DF	CRO	Niko Galešić (from Rijeka)
16	FW	CIV	Wilfried Kanga (from (Germany) Hertha BSC, previously on loan at (Wales) Cardiff City)
23	MF	CRO	Leon Belcar (on loan from Varaždin)
38	MF	CRO	Bartol Franjić (on loan from (Germany) VfL Wolfsburg, previously on loan at (Ukraine) Shakhtar Donetsk)
—	MF	CRO	Jakov-Anton Vasilj (from Šibenik)

Out:

No.	Pos.	Nation	Player
3	DF	JPN	Takuya Ogiwara (loan return to (Japan) Urawa Red Diamonds)
6	DF	FRA	Maxime Bernauer (on loan to (France) Saint-Étienne)
23	GK	CRO	Ivan Filipović (on loan to Šibenik)
32	GK	BIH	Faris Krkalić (to (Finland) Ilves)
39	DF	CRO	Mauro Perković (on loan to (Poland) Cracovia)
77	FW	CRO	Dario Špikić (on loan to (Greece) Aris Thessaloniki)
—	DF	CRO	Borna Graonić (on loan to Jarun, previously on loan at Dugopolje)
—	MF	CRO	Domagoj Vidović (on loan to Rudeš, previously on loan at Zrinski Osječko)
—	MF	CRO	Marko Brkljača (on loan to Jarun, previously on loan at (Slovenia) Primorje)
—	FW	CRO	Vilim Gec (on loan to Sesvete, previously on loan at Croatia Zmijavci)
—	FW	CRO	Toni Majić (on loan to (Bosnia and Herzegovina) Zrinjski Mostar, previously on loan at Gorica)
—	GK	CRO	Dorian Klarin (to Dugo Selo)
—	MF	CRO	Jakov-Anton Vasilj (to Lokomotiva)
—	FW	BIH	Luka Menalo (to Rijeka)

=== Rijeka ===
In:

No.	Pos.	Nation	Player
5	DF	CRO	Mile Škorić (from (China) Tianjin Jinmen Tiger)
9	FW	CRO	Duje Čop (from Lokomotiva)
15	DF	MKD	Jovan Manev (from (Turkey) Adana Demirspor)
17	FW	BIH	Luka Menalo (from Dinamo Zagreb)
22	DF	CRO	Ante Oreč (from (Bosnia and Herzegovina) Velež Mostar)
37	FW	GAM	Cherno Saho (from Buje)

Out:

No.	Pos.	Nation	Player
1	GK	CRO	Josip Posavec (on loan to (Slovenia) Primorje)
5	DF	CRO	Niko Galešić (to Dinamo Zagreb)
9	FW	SRB	Komnen Andrić (on loan to Lokomotiva)
28	DF	CRO	Ivan Smolčić (to (Italy) Como)
32	DF	CRO	Marijan Čabraja (free agent)
77	FW	CRO	Stipe Perica (to (Romania) Dinamo București)
87	FW	CRO	Marco Pašalić (to (United States) Orlando City)
—	MF	MKD	Matej Momčilovski (on loan to (Slovenia) Brinje Grosuplje, previously on loan at Orijent)
—	FW	CRO	Dominik Simčić (on loan to Bijelo Brdo, previously on loan at (Slovenia) Koper)
—	DF	CRO	Duje Dujmović (to (Bosnia and Herzegovina) Zrinjski Mostar, previously on loan at Šibenik)
—	FW	CRO	Niko Gajzler (to (Slovenia) Radomlje, previously on loan)

=== Hajduk Split ===
In:

No.	Pos.	Nation	Player
15	FW	CRO	Michele Šego (from Varaždin)
29	FW	SVN	Jan Mlakar (on loan from (Italy) Pisa)
77	FW	UKR	Nazariy Rusyn (on loan from (England) Sunderland)

Out:

No.	Pos.	Nation	Player
16	MF	BIH	Madžid Šošić (to (Bosnia and Herzegovina) Željezničar)
18	DF	MAR	Fahd Moufi (to (Morocco) Wydad)
22	FW	GER	Leon Dajaku (free agent)
31	DF	CRO	Zvonimir Šarlija (on loan to (Cyprus) Pafos)
35	MF	CRO	Luka Jurak (on loan to (Slovenia) Mura)
39	FW	CRO	Mate Antunović (to Varaždin)
40	GK	CRO	Borna Buljan (to (Slovenia) Bravo)
45	MF	MAR	Yassine Benrahou (on loan to (France) Caen)
—	FW	CRO	Jere Vrcić (to Croatia Zmijavci, previously on loan)
—	FW	CRO	Krešimir Nazor (to Croatia Zmijavci, previously on loan at GOŠK-Dubrovnik)

=== Osijek ===
In:

No.	Pos.	Nation	Player
1	GK	ITA	Mattia Del Favero (from (Italy) Taranto)
6	MF	CRO	Hrvoje Babec (on loan from (Latvia) Riga)
8	FW	NGA	Justice Ohajunwa (from (Moldova) Zimbru Chișinău)
15	DF	ALB	Jon Mersinaj (from Lokomotiva)

Out:

No.	Pos.	Nation	Player
1	GK	CRO	Nikola Čavlina (loan return to Dinamo Zagreb)
4	DF	CRO	Krešimir Vrbanac (on loan to Bijelo Brdo)
15	GK	CRO	Tin Sajko (to Rudeš)
37	FW	CRO	Luka Branšteter (on loan to Cibalia)
—	FW	CRO	Antun Damjanović (to Zrinski Osječko, previously on loan at Cibalia)
—	FW	CRO	Kristian Fućak (to Istra 1961, previously on loan at (Hungary) Zalaegerszeg)

=== Lokomotiva ===
In:

No.	Pos.	Nation	Player
4	DF	ARG	Leonardo Sigali (from (Argentina) Racing Club)
9	FW	SRB	Komnen Andrić (on loan from Rijeka)
11	MF	CRO	Denis Bušnja (from (Thailand) BG Pathum United, previously on loan at (Thailand) Muangthong United)
24	MF	CRO	Ivan Katić (from Dugopolje)
29	MF	CRO	Jakov-Anton Vasilj (from Dinamo Zagreb)
30	FW	MNE	Dušan Vuković (from (Montenegro) Sutjeska Nikšić, previously on loan)

Out:

No.	Pos.	Nation	Player
1	GK	CRO	Toni Silić (loan return to Hajduk Split)
4	DF	BRA	Pedro Oliveira (on loan to Rudeš)
5	DF	ALB	Jon Mersinaj (to Osijek)
9	FW	CRO	Duje Čop (to Rijeka)
11	FW	BIH	Filip Čuić (to Gorica)
19	MF	CRO	Ivan Krolo (on loan to Dugopolje)
24	FW	MNE	Balša Tošković (to (Montenegro) Sutjeska Nikšić)
29	MF	USA	Gedion Zelalem (to (United States) New Mexico United)
—	FW	CRO	Lovro Stanić (on loan to Marsonia 1909)
—	FW	CRO	Carlo Mateković (on loan to Jarun, previously on loan at (Czech Republic) Zbrojovka Brno)
—	GK	CRO	Duje Biuk (to Hrvace)
—	DF	CRO	Vinko Bičanić (to (Slovenia) Krka, previously on loan)

=== Varaždin ===
In:

No.	Pos.	Nation	Player
11	FW	CRO	Mate Antunović (from Hajduk Split)
14	MF	ESP	Jaime Sierra (from (Belgium) Deinze)
15	MF	CRO	Matej Vuk (from Istra 1961)
17	MF	CRO	Mario Čuić (from Istra 1961)
21	GK	CRO	Tomislav Tomić (from (Bosnia and Herzegovina) Široki Brijeg)
26	FW	ALB	Atdhe Mazari (from (North Macedonia) Rabotnički)
44	DF	CRO	Mateo Barać (from (Kazakhstan) Aktobe)

Out:

No.	Pos.	Nation	Player
6	DF	CRO	Ivan Nekić (to (Germany) Holstein Kiel)
10	MF	CRO	Leon Belcar (on loan to Dinamo Zagreb)
11	FW	CRO	Michele Šego (to Hajduk Split)
14	MF	CRO	Ante Ćorić (free agent)
29	FW	CRO	Niko Domjanić (on loan to (Latvia) Liepāja)
—	MF	CRO	Martin Plavec Marković (to Varteks, previously on loan at (Slovenia) Brinje Grosuplje)

=== Gorica ===
In:

No.	Pos.	Nation	Player
4	DF	NED	Matthew Steenvoorden (from (Malaysia) Terengganu)
9	FW	BIH	Filip Čuić (from Lokomotiva)
14	MF	MKD	Agon Elezi (on loan from (Germany) VfL Bochum)
18	MF	CRO	Ivan Fiolić (free agent)
24	DF	CRO	Mateo Bašić (from Dugopolje)
27	DF	SVN	Gregor Sikošek (on loan from (Slovenia) Maribor)
28	DF	CRO	Slavko Bralić (on loan from (Slovenia) Celje)
29	MF	SRB	Nikola Jojić (on loan from (England) Stoke City, previously on loan at (Serbia) Mladost Lučani)
30	GK	CRO	Darijan Žarkov (from (Malta) Gżira United)
32	MF	CRO	Tibor Halilović (free agent)
47	DF	CRO	Anton Krešić (on loan from (Romania) CFR Cluj)
50	FW	CRO	Ante Erceg (from (Netherlands) Fortuna Sittard)
87	MF	CRO	Antonio Ilić (from (Austria) Sturm Graz II)

Out:

No.	Pos.	Nation	Player
12	FW	POR	Mesaque Djú (to (Portugal) Oliveirense)
13	GK	CRO	Matej Vidić (on loan to Segesta)
17	MF	CRO	Vinko Skrbin (on loan to (Slovenia) Gorica)
24	FW	CRO	Toni Majić (loan return to Dinamo Zagreb)
37	MF	GER	Meritan Shabani (free agent)
40	DF	SRB	Đuro-Giulio Đekić (to (Serbia) Vršac)
47	MF	SRB	Damjan Pavlović (to (Lithuania) Kauno Žalgiris)
66	DF	CRO	Ante Sušak (loan return to Dinamo Zagreb)
—	DF	CRO	Luka Dora (on loan to Samobor, previously on loan at Segesta)
—	MF	CRO	Patrik Jug (on loan to Jarun, previously on loan at Croatia Zmijavci)
—	MF	CRO	Luka Brlek (on loan to (Slovenia) Brežice 1919, previously on loan at Karlovac 1919)
—	FW	CRO	Lovro Nezirović (on loan to Dugo Selo, previously on loan at Karlovac 1919)

=== Istra 1961 ===
In:

No.	Pos.	Nation	Player
1	GK	CRO	Franko Kolić (from (Slovenia) Mura)
6	MF	ISL	Logi Hrafn Róbertsson (from (Iceland) FH)
22	FW	ISL	Danijel Djuric (from (Iceland) Víkingur Reykjavik)
24	FW	BIH	Vinko Rozić (from (Bosnia and Herzegovina) Posušje)
44	MF	BIH	Stjepan Lončar (from (Poland) Lech Poznań)
57	FW	CRO	Kristian Fućak (from Osijek, previously on loan at (Hungary) Zalaegerszeg)
—	FW	NGA	Charles Adah Agada (from (Nigeria) Mavlon)

Out:

No.	Pos.	Nation	Player
1	GK	CRO	Marijan Ćorić (to (Kosovo) Llapi)
15	DF	CAN	Jovan Ivanisevic (on loan to (Italy) Bologna Primavera)
20	DF	MDA	Iurie Iovu (on loan to (Spain) Alavés B)
22	MF	CRO	Matej Vuk (to Varaždin)
31	MF	MTN	Beyatt Lekweiry (to (Switzerland) Lausanne)
44	DF	VEN	Andrés Ferro (to (Venezuela) Metropolitanos)
71	MF	GAB	André Poko (to (Turkey) Amed)
75	FW	FRA	Elias Filet (to (Switzerland) Aarau)
77	MF	CRO	Mario Čuić (to Varaždin)
—	GK	CRO	Carlo Jurak (on loan to Uljanik)

=== Slaven Belupo ===
In:

No.	Pos.	Nation	Player
3	DF	CRO	Antonio Jakir (from Solin)
—	FW	CRO	Marko Žuljević (from Marsonia 1909)

Out:

No.	Pos.	Nation	Player
2	DF	CRO	Zvonimir Katalinić (on loan to Jarun)
3	DF	CRO	Erik Riđan (on loan to Bijelo Brdo)
9	MF	CRO	Robert Murić (to (Slovenia) Mura)
11	MF	BRA	Lucas Fernandes (on loan to Jarun)
17	FW	CRO	Dominik Martinović (to (Germany) Rot-Weiss Essen)
45	FW	CRO	Karlo Butić (to (Bosnia and Herzegovina) Sarajevo)
88	MF	CRO	Ivan Jelić Balta (loan return to (Bosnia and Herzegovina) Sarajevo)
—	FW	CRO	Marko Žuljević (on loan to Karlovac 1919)

=== Šibenik ===
In:

No.	Pos.	Nation	Player
2	DF	USA	Aidan Liu (from (Germany) Viktoria Berlin)
5	MF	CRO	Lovro Cvek (from (Kazakhstan) Ordabasy)
23	DF	CRO	Zoran Nižić (from (Kazakhstan) Kyzylzhar)
32	DF	BIH	Elvir Duraković (on loan from (Bosnia and Herzegovina) Sarajevo)
40	GK	CRO	Ivan Filipović (on loan from Dinamo Zagreb)
70	MF	CRO	Antonio Jakoliš (free agent)
—	FW	SUI	Leo Perić (from (Switzerland) Brühl)

Out:

No.	Pos.	Nation	Player
2	DF	CRO	Bruno Brajković (on loan to Dugopolje)
5	DF	CRO	Duje Dujmović (loan return to Rijeka)
6	MF	CMR	Joseph Iyendjock (on loan to Croatia Zmijavci)
17	FW	BRA	Lucas Falcão (to (Finland) Haka)
19	FW	CRO	Ivan Delić (on loan to (Slovenia) Bravo)
92	MF	CRO	Jakov-Anton Vasilj (to Dinamo Zagreb)
—	FW	SUI	Leo Perić (on loan to Dugopolje)
—	FW	CRO	Diego Sekulić (on loan to Mladost Ždralovi, previously on loan at Bijelo Brdo)

== See also ==
- 2024–25 Croatian Football League
