= Istra 1961–Rijeka rivalry =

Rijeka vs Istra 1961 (Rijeka–Pula derby)
- Other names: Regionalni derbi, susjedski derbi, derbi della Učka
- Location: Rijeka and Pula, Croatia
- Teams: Rijeka and Istra 1961
- First meeting: 18 September 2004 (official)
- Latest meeting: Rijeka 3–2 Istra 1961; 2026–27 HNL (23 August 2026)
- Next meeting: 7 November 2026

Statistics
- Total meetings: 90 (86 league)
- Most wins: Rijeka (54)
- Most player appearances: Fausto Budicin (15)
- Top scorer: Antonio Čolak (9)
- Largest victory: Istra 1961 0–7 Rijeka (4 May 2019)

The Rijeka–Pula derby (Croatian: Derbi Rijeka – Pula), also called Derby della Učka (Derby del Monte Maggiore) is the name given to matches between Rijeka and Istra 1961. It is a regional derby between football clubs from Croatia's two largest northern coastal cities, Rijeka and Pula. The teams are supported by their fanbases called Rijeka's Armada and Pula's Demoni.

== History ==
The rivalry between Rijeka and Pula dates back to the days of Kingdom of Italy in the early 1920s, when numerous clubs from Fiume (Rijeka) and Pola (Pula) met at various levels of the Italian league system. The first official match between Rijeka and Pula took place on 25 June 1920, between Juventus Enea Fiume and US Polese. While numerous Rijeka/Fiume (Juventus Enea, CS Olympia, CS Gloria, CS Fiume, Veloce, Magazzini Generali) and Pula/Pola (Polese, Grion, Edera) regularly met during this period, the most notable rivalry existed between the leading club of each city, U.S. Fiumana (successor of Olympia and Gloria after 1926) and G.S.F. Giovanni Grion Pola. Between 1930 and 1943, these two clubs played 20 official matches, with Fiumana winning 11 and Grion 5 matches, alongside 4 draws.

Following the end of World War II, the two cities became part of the Yugoslavia. Like all clubs in Yugoslavia, U.S. Fiumana got restructured into the more proletarian-friendly brand S.C.F. Quarnero in July 1946. The new regime decided to invite a club from the occupied Julian March for the 1946–47 Yugoslav First League and Quarnero was admitted after beating the short-lived Pula-based club USO (Unione Sportiva Operaia) in a two-legged play-off in August 1946. In late 1947 USO merged with another local club to form NK Pula, which survives today as NK Istra. The Quarnero was renamed to NK Rijeka in June 1954. During this period Rijeka spent most seasons playing in the Yugoslav First League, while Pula clubs played in the lower tiers. Until the break-up of Yugoslavia in 1991, Rijeka played 21 official fixtures against Istra and Uljanik, mainly during its stay in the lower divisions in the 1950s and early 1970s, and in the 1973 and 1978–79 Yugoslav Cup. Two other clubs from Rijeka, NK Orijent and NK Lučki Radnik met more frequently Istra and Uljanik in the lower tiers of Yugoslav football.

Since Croatian independence, Istra joined Croatia's top tier, and local derbies became a regular feature. Between 1992 and 2000, Rijeka and Istra met on 17 occasions, with Rijeka winning on eight and Istra on six occasions, while three matches finished in a draw. Pula did not have a top-tier club between 2000 and 2004. In 2004, NK Pula 1856, former Uljanik, was promoted to Prva HNL. In 2005, the club was renamed to NK Pula Staro Češko, in 2006 to NK Pula and, finally, in summer 2007 to NK Istra 1961. Since July 2004, Istra 1961 and Rijeka have played 73 regional derbies, with Rijeka winning 46 and Istra 1961 9 games, while 18 matches ended in a draw.

== Results ==
Competition	Played	Rijeka wins	Draws	Istra wins	Rijeka goals	Istra goals
Rijeka v. Istra (1992–2000)
Prva HNL	17	8	3	6	27	13
Rijeka v. Istra 1961 (2004–present)
HNL	69	43	18	8	124	50
Croatian Cup	4	3	0	1	6	4
Totals	73	46	18	9	130	54
All Time	90	54	21	15	157	67

Last updated on 23 August 2026.

== List of matches ==
=== Key ===
Match ended in a draw
Rijeka win
Istra win

Note: Home team's score always shown first

=== 1992–2000 ===
M	Date	Competition	Ground	Score	Rijeka scorers	Istra scorers	Attendance	Report
1	7 Mar 1992	1. HNL	Drosina	1–1	Ban	Dadić	4,000	HRnogomet.com
2	2 May 1992	1. HNL	Kantrida	3–0	Ljubančić (3)		1,000	HRnogomet.com
3	11 Oct 1992	1. HNL	Drosina	2–1	Šarić	Jurić, Knežević	4,000	HRnogomet.com
4	25 Apr 1993	1. HNL	Kantrida	0–0			2,000	HRnogomet.com
5	21 Aug 1993	1. HNL	Drosina	1–0		Jozipović	4,000	HRnogomet.com
6	27 Feb 1994	1. HNL	Kantrida	2–0	Mladenović (2)		2,000	HRnogomet.com
7	23 Oct 1994	1. HNL	Valkane	1–0		Jurčić	2,000	HRnogomet.com
8	30 Apr 1995	1. HNL	Kantrida	2–2	Hodžić (2)	Meštrović, Ugrčić	2,000	HRnogomet.com
9	13 Sep 1995	1. HNL	Kantrida	4–0	Dželalija (2), Perković, Živković		1,000	HRnogomet.com
10	26 Nov 1995	1. HNL	Drosina	0–1	Brkić		2,500	HRnogomet.com
11	14 Apr 1996	1. HNL	Drosina	1–0		Fatorić	8,000	HRnogomet.com
12	22 May 1996	1. HNL	Kantrida	4–1	Perković (3), Brkić	Scoria	6,000	HRnogomet.com
13	18 Aug 1996	1. HNL	Kantrida	2–0	Perković, J. Samardžić		4,000	HRnogomet.com
14	2 Mar 1997	1. HNL	Drosina	0–2	Alempić (o.g.), Brkić		3,500	HRnogomet.com
15	2 Oct 1999	1. HNL	Kantrida	4–1	Hasančić, Milicic (2), Balaban	Bjelanović	3,000	HRnogomet.com
16	29 Feb 2000	1. HNL	Drosina	1–0		Nosek	4,000	HRnogomet.com
17	25 Mar 2000	1. HNL	Drosina	2–1	Čačić	Nosek, Župan	4,500	HRnogomet.com

=== 2004–present ===
M	Date	Competition	Ground	Score	Rijeka scorers	Istra 1961 scorers	Attendance	Report
1	18 Sep 2004	1. HNL	Veruda	0–0			3,500	HRnogomet.com
2	26 Feb 2005	1. HNL	Kantrida	1–1	D. Tadić	Jerneić	4,000	HRnogomet.com
3	23 Jul 2005	1. HNL	Kantrida	2–2	Zekić, Krpan	Jerneić, Pilipović	4,000	HRnogomet.com
4	22 Oct 2005	1. HNL	Veruda	3–0		Šehić (2), Jerneić	3,000	HRnogomet.com
5	14 Oct 2006	1. HNL	Veruda	2–3	Toñito (2), Bule	Raić-Sudar, Budicin	2,500	HRnogomet.com
6	3 Mar 2007	1. HNL	Kantrida	2–0	Ah. Sharbini, Ivanov		2,000	HRnogomet.com
7	28 Apr 2007	1. HNL	Kantrida	1–1	M. Brajković	Halilović	800	HRnogomet.com
8	21 Nov 2009	1. HNL	Kantrida	2–0	Štrok, Križman		1,500	HRnogomet.com
9	13 May 2010	1. HNL	Veruda	2–0		Anđelković, Šehić	2,500	HRnogomet.com
10	16 Oct 2010	1. HNL	Veruda	0–0			2,500	HRnogomet.com
11	23 Apr 2011	1. HNL	Kantrida	2–0	Vukman, Čulina		1,500	HRnogomet.com
12	24 Sep 2011	1. HNL	Kantrida	0–0			3,000	HRnogomet.com
13	11 Apr 2012	1. HNL	Drosina	0–0			2,500	HRnogomet.com
14	6 Oct 2012	1. HNL	Kantrida	2–1	Cesarec, Datković	Bačelić-Grgić	3,500	HRnogomet.com
15	3 Mar 2013	1. HNL	Drosina	1–1	Kreilach	Bačelić-Grgić	5,000	HRnogomet.com
16	10 May 2013	1. HNL	Drosina	1–0		Hadžić	4,000	HRnogomet.com
17	20 Jul 2013	1. HNL	Kantrida	3–0	Tomečak, Benko (2)		5,000	HRnogomet.com
18	22 Sep 2013	1. HNL	Drosina	2–3	Benko, Kvržić, Krstanović	Franjić, Križman	4,000	HRnogomet.com
19	8 Dec 2013	1. HNL	Kantrida	3–3	Kramarić (3)	Batarelo, Franjić, Babić	5,000	HRnogomet.com
20	19 Mar 2014	Cup (SF)	Kantrida	2–1	Kramarić (2)	Radonjić	7,000	HRnogomet.com
21	26 Mar 2014	Cup (SF)	Drosina	0–1	Krstanović		7,500	HRnogomet.com
22	30 Mar 2014	1. HNL	Drosina	0–1	Krstanović		2,500	HRnogomet.com
23	4 Aug 2014	1. HNL	Drosina	0–1	Krstanović		5,000	HRnogomet.com
24	18 Oct 2014	1. HNL	Kantrida	3–1	Jajalo, Kramarić, Zec	Tomić	5,000	HRnogomet.com
25	15 Feb 2015	1. HNL	Drosina	0–0			3,000	HRnogomet.com
26	26 Apr 2015	1. HNL	Kantrida	3–0	Tomasov (2), Álex		3,500	HRnogomet.com
27	13 Sep 2015	1. HNL	Drosina	0–1	Bezjak		3,012	prvahnl.hr
28	28 Nov 2015	1. HNL	Rujevica	1–0	Tomasov		4,180	prvahnl.hr
29	12 Mar 2016	1. HNL	Drosina	0–1	Tomasov		2,251	prvahnl.hr
30	14 May 2016	1. HNL	Rujevica	2–0	Vešović, Brezovec		3,322	prvahnl.hr
31	22 Jul 2016	1. HNL	Rujevica	4–1	Gavranović (2), Bezjak (2)	Roce	3,954	prvahnl.hr
32	30 Sep 2016	1. HNL	Drosina	0–2	Črnic, Gorgon		3,984	prvahnl.hr
33	17 Dec 2016	1. HNL	Rujevica	1–0	Andrijašević		4,471	prvahnl.hr
34	22 Apr 2017	1. HNL	Drosina	1–1	Gorgon	Gržan	4,746	prvahnl.hr
35	29 Jul 2017	1. HNL	Rujevica	2–0	Gorgon, Gojković (o.g.)		5,504	prvahnl.hr
36	14 Oct 2017	1. HNL	Drosina	1–0		Puclin	2,040	prvahnl.hr
37	10 Feb 2018	1. HNL	Rujevica	4–0	Puljić, Čolak, Črnic, Zuta		4,151	prvahnl.hr
38	17 Apr 2018	1. HNL	Drosina	0–1	Kvržić		1,637	prvahnl.hr
39	26 Aug 2018	1. HNL	Rujevica	3–3	Héber (3)	Mierez (2), Obeng	4,517	prvahnl.hr
40	11 Nov 2018	1. HNL	Drosina	1–2	Čolak, Kvržić	Perić-Komšić	1,953	prvahnl.hr
41	1 Mar 2019	1. HNL	Rujevica	2–0	Gorgon, Murić		4,275	prvahnl.hr
42	4 May 2019	1. HNL	Drosina	0–7	Pavičić (2), Čolak (2), Acosty, Puljić, Capan		1,741	prvahnl.hr
43	22 Sep 2019	1. HNL	Drosina	0–3	Andrijašević, Lončar, Murić		2,797	prvahnl.hr
44	8 Dec 2019	1. HNL	Rujevica	2–0	Gorgon, Murić		4,045	prvahnl.hr
45	7 Jun 2020	1. HNL	Drosina	1–3	Lončar, Čolak, Murić	Perić-Komšić	0	prvahnl.hr
46	25 Jul 2020	1. HNL	Rujevica	4–2	Čolak (4)	Guzina (2)	0	prvahnl.hr
47	29 Aug 2020	1. HNL	Rujevica	2–1	Andrijašević (2)	Guzina	0	prvahnl.hr
48	27 Jan 2021	1. HNL	Drosina	1–2	Andrijašević (2)	Špoljarić	0	prvahnl.hr
49	13 Feb 2021	1. HNL	Rujevica	1–1	Murić	Gržan	0	prvahnl.hr
50	7 Apr 2021	Cup (SF)	Drosina	3–2	Drmić, Murić	Šutalo, Hara, Guzina	0	hns-cff.hr
51	21 Apr 2021	1. HNL	Drosina	1–2	Murić, Kulenović	Galilea	0	prvahnl.hr
52	25 Jul 2021	1. HNL	Rujevica	2–0	Drmić (2)		2,015	prvahnl.hr
53	2 Oct 2021	1. HNL	Drosina	3–6	Krešić, Pavičić (2), Vučkić, Ampem, Bušnja	João Silva, Mahmoud, Lisica	1,274	prvahnl.hr
54	18 Dec 2021	1. HNL	Rujevica	1–0	Obregón		3,255	prvahnl.hr
55	2 Apr 2022	1. HNL	Drosina	0–2	Vučkić (2)		2,170	prvahnl.hr
56	21 Aug 2022	HNL	Drosina	1–1	Vučkić	Petković	2,422	hnl.hr
57	29 Oct 2022	HNL	Rujevica	0–1		Erceg	3,755	hnl.hr
58	3 Mar 2023	HNL	Drosina	0–2	Janković (2)		3,019	hnl.hr
59	6 May 2023	HNL	Rujevica	2–2	Frigan, Ampem	Kadušić, Bakrar	6,657	hnl.hr
60	6 Aug 2023	HNL	Rujevica	6–0	Ivanović, Selahi, Pašalić, Goda, Majstorović (o.g.), Grgić		4,856	hnl.hr
61	22 Oct 2023	HNL	Drosina	1–1	Janković	Mlinar	3,665	hnl.hr
62	4 Feb 2024	HNL	Rujevica	3–0	Hodža, Janković, Marić		7,588	hnl.hr
63	14 Apr 2024	HNL	Drosina	0–2	Fruk, Goda		5,228	hnl.hr
64	17 Aug 2024	HNL	Rujevica	4–0	Rukavina, Pašalić, Ivanović (2)		4,159	hnl.hr
65	3 Nov 2024	HNL	Drosina	0–1	Fruk		3,569	hnl.hr
66	8 Feb 2025	HNL	Rujevica	0–1		Gagua	4,893	hnl.hr
67	2 Apr 2025	Cup (SF)	Rujevica	1–0	Fruk		6,109	hns-cff.hr
68	19 Apr 2025	HNL	Drosina	2–0		Lawal, Rozić	6,088	hnl.hr
69	27 Sep 2025	HNL	Rujevica	0–0			5,369	hnl.hr
70	20 Jan 2026	HNL	Drosina	1–2	Menalo, Dantas	Lawal	3,386	hnl.hr
71	15 Mar 2026	HNL	Rujevica	0–2		Prevljak, Frederiksen	5,897	hnl.hr
72	17 May 2026	HNL	Drosina	0–0			3,249	hnl.hr
73	23 Aug 2026	HNL	Rujevica	3–2	Nasraoui (o.g.), Puljić, Fruk	Jaganjac, Frederiksen	5,371	hnl.hr

== Players ==
=== Top scorers ===
Updated up to the last derby played on 23 August 2026.

9 goals

- (Croatia) Antonio Čolak (Rijeka)

7 goals

- (Croatia) Robert Murić (Rijeka)

6 goals

- (Croatia) Franko Andrijašević (Rijeka)
- (Croatia) Andrej Kramarić (Rijeka)

5 goals

- (Austria) Alexander Gorgon (Rijeka)
- (Croatia) Borimir Perković (Rijeka)

4 goals

- (Croatia) Toni Fruk (Rijeka)
- (Bosnia and Herzegovina) Gedeon Guzina (Istra 1961)
- (Croatia) Niko Janković (Rijeka)
- (Croatia) Ivan Krstanović (Rijeka)
- (Croatia) Domagoj Pavičić (Rijeka)
- (Croatia) Marin Tomasov (Rijeka)
- (Slovenia) Haris Vučkić (Rijeka)

3 goals

- (Croatia) Leon Benko (Rijeka)
- (Slovenia) Roman Bezjak (Rijeka)
- (Bosnia and Herzegovina) Senad Brkić (Rijeka)
- (Switzerland) Josip Drmić (Rijeka)
- (Brazil) Héber (Rijeka)
- (Croatia) Franjo Ivanović (Rijeka)
- (Croatia) Josip Jerneić (Istra 1961)
- (Bosnia and Herzegovina) Zoran Kvržić (Rijeka)
- (Croatia) Dean Ljubančić (Rijeka)
- (Croatia) Jakov Puljić (Rijeka)
- (Bosnia and Herzegovina) Asim Šehić (Istra 1961)

=== Players who have scored in Rijeka–Pula derby for both clubs ===
- Sandi Križman (2 goals, 1 for Rijeka and 1 for Istra 1961)

=== Players who have played for both clubs (senior career) ===
- Boško Anić
- Mateo Bertoša
- Dario Bodrušić
- Fausto Budicin
- Denis Bušnja
- Igor Čagalj
- Mladen Devetak
- Matko Djarmati
- Sandi Dobrić
- Mate Dragičević
- João Escoval
- Marin Grujević
- Nedim Halilović
- Darko Horvat
- Dani Iglesias
- Elmir Imširević
- Vanja Iveša
- Sergej Jakirović
- Josip Jerneić
- Redi Jupi
- Irenko Jurić
- Jurica Karabatić
- Ilija Kljajić
- Damir Knežević
- Saša Kolić
- Fabijan Komljenović
- Ljupko Kontešić
- Sandi Križman
- Ivan Kurtović
- Siniša Linić
- Robert Lisjak
- Stjepan Lončar
- Josip Lukunić
- Ante Majstorović
- Admir Malkić
- Ivan Mance
- Luka Marić
- Bernardo Matić
- Andréa Mbuyi-Mutombo
- Marin Mikac
- Mato Miloš
- Ivan Močinić
- Alen Pamić
- Manuel Pamić
- Branko Panić
- Goran Paracki
- Dalibor Pauletić
- Renato Pilipović
- Andrej Prskalo
- Natko Rački
- Josip Radošević
- Dragan Raković
- Zedi Ramadani
- Ivan Rodić
- Elvis Scoria
- Ahmad Sharbini
- Dalibor Starčević
- Valentino Stepčić
- Andro Švrljuga
- Dragan Tadić
- Goran Vincetić
- Luka Vučko
- Matej Vuk
- Neven Vukman
- Ivor Weitzer
- Zoran Zekić
- Damir Zlomislić
- Andrej Živković

== Managers who have managed both clubs ==
- Milivoj Bračun
- Nenad Gračan
- Srećko Juričić
- Robert Rubčić
- Elvis Scoria
- Zoran Vulić
- Fausto Budicin

== Prva HNL results ==
The table lists the place each team took in each of the seasons.

	1992	92–93	93–94	94–95	95–96	96–97	99–00
No. of teams	12	16	18	16	14	16	12
Rijeka	6	4	6	11	9	4	4
Istra	7	8	10	12	11	15	11

	04–05	05–06	06–07	09–10	10–11	11–12	12–13	13–14	14–15	15–16	16–17	17–18	18–19	19–20	20–21	21-22	22-23	23-24	24-25
No. of teams	12	12	12	16	16	16	12	10	10	10	10	10	10	10	10	10	10	10	10
Rijeka	4	2	7	9	9	12	3	2	2	2	1	2	2	3	3	4	4	2	1
Istra 1961	10	7	11	11	15	9	6	6	9	9	6	9	9	9	9	9	5	8	6

== See also ==
- Eternal derby
- Adriatic derby
- Dinamo–Rijeka derby
