= Stephane Keller =

Cameroonian footballer

Personal information
- Full name: Stephane Paul Keller
- Date of birth: 20 August 2001 (age 25)
- Place of birth: Grand Batanga, Cameroon
- Height: 1.90 m (6 ft 3 in)
- Position: Centre back

Team information
- Current team: Beveren (on loan from Al-Ittihad)
- Number: 77

Youth career
- Fortuna Yaoundé
- 2018–2020: Alavés

Senior career*
Years	Team	Apps	(Gls)
2020–2024	Alavés B	77	(1)
2021–2025	Alavés	1	(0)
2024–2025	→ Istra 1961 (loan)	15	(0)
2025–2026	AEL Limassol	19	(0)
2026	→ Al-Ittihad (loan)	0	(0)
2026–	Al-Ittihad	3	(0)
2026–	→ Beveren (loan)	1	(0)

International career^{‡}
2023	Cameroon U23	2	(0)
2026–	Cameroon	3	(0)
- * Club domestic league appearances and goals as of 22:13, 21 September 2026 (UTC) ‡ National team caps and goals as of 22:02, 29 September 2026 (UTC)

Stephane Paul Keller (born 20 August 2001) is a Cameroonian footballer who plays as a central defender for Belgian Pro League club Beveren on loan from Al-Ittihad, and the Cameroon national team.

== Club career ==
Keller was born in Grand Batanga, Keller joined Deportivo Alavés' youth setup in 2018, from AS Fortuna Yaoundé. Promoted to the reserves in Segunda División B ahead of the 2020–21 season, he made his senior debut on 24 October 2020, coming on as a second-half substitute for Sergi García in a 2–0 home win against Arenas Club de Getxo.

On 1 December 2020, Keller renewed his contract until 2024. He made his first team – and La Liga – debut the following 10 January, replacing Rodrigo Battaglia in a 1–3 away loss against Cádiz CF.

On 22 July 2024, Keller was loaned to Croatian Football League side NK Istra 1961 for one year.

== International career ==
Keller played for the Cameroon U23s for a set of 2023 U-23 Africa Cup of Nations qualification matches in March 2023.

== Career statistics ==
=== Club ===
As of match played 21 September 2026

Appearances and goals by club, season and competition
Club	Season	League			National cup		Continental		Other		Total	
Club	Season	Division	Apps	Goals	Apps	Goals	Apps	Goals	Apps	Goals	Apps	Goals
Alavés B	2020–21	Segunda División B	17	0	—		—		2 (Note: Appearances in Segunda División B play-offs)	0	19	0
Alavés B	2021–22	Segunda Federación	23	1	—		—		4 (Note: Appearances in 2022 Segunda División RFEF play-offs)	0	27	1
Alavés B	2022–23	Segunda Federación	25	0	—		—		—		25	0
Alavés B	2023–24	Segunda Federación	12	0	—		—		—		12	0
Alavés B	Total		77	1	—		—		—		77	1
Alavés	2020–21	La Liga	1	0	—		—		—		1	0
Istra 1961 (loan)	2024–25	Croatian Football League	15	0	1	0	—		—		16	0
AEL Limassol	2025–26	Cypriot First Division	19	0	2	0	—		—		21	0
Al-Ittihad (loan)	2025–26	Saudi Pro League	0	0	0	0	4 (Note: Appearances in AFC Champions League Elite)	1	—		4	1
Al-Ittihad	2026–27	Saudi Pro League	3	0	0	0	1	0	—		4	0
Career total			115!1	3	0	0	5	1	6	0	129	2

=== International ===
As of match played 29 September 2026

Appearances and goals by national team and year
National team	Year	Apps	Goals
Cameroon	2026	3	0
Total		3	0
