= Marcel Heister =

German footballer

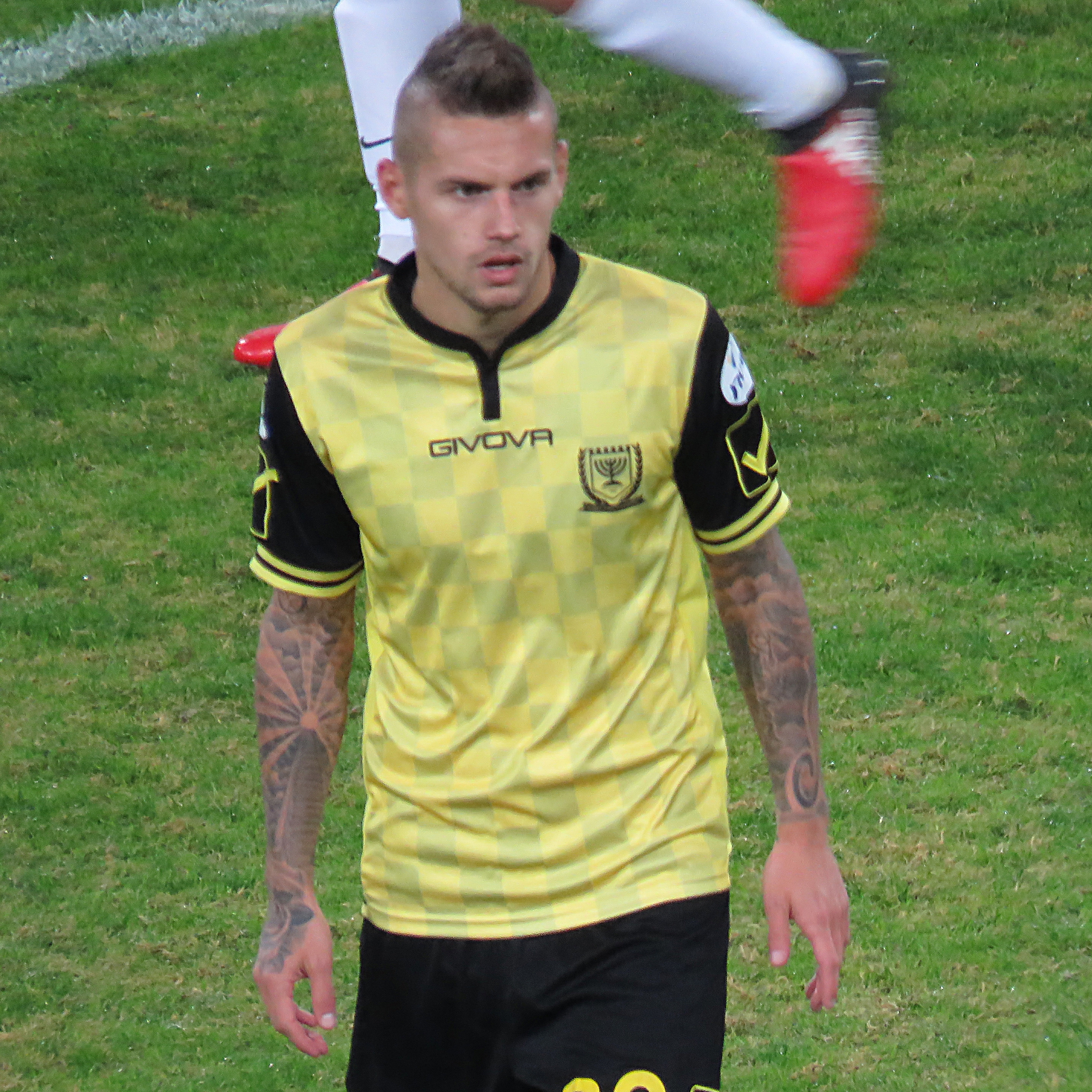
- Heister in 2016

Personal information
- Date of birth: 29 July 1992 (age 34)
- Place of birth: Albstadt-Ebingen, Germany
- Height: 1.82 m (5 ft 11 1/2 in)
- Positions: Left back; winger

Team information
- Current team: Osijek
- Number: 2

Youth career
- 1999–2003: TSV Gammertingen
- 2003–2010: SSV Reutlingen
- 2010–2011: TSG Hoffenheim

Senior career*
Years	Team	Apps	(Gls)
2011–2012	TSG Hoffenheim II	26	(0)
2012–2014	Zadar	31	(2)
2014–2016	Istra 1961	64	(3)
2016–2018	Beitar Jerusalem	44	(3)
2018–2021	Ferencváros	70	(2)
2021–2023	Fehérvár	49	(1)
2023	Ludogorets Razgrad	6	(0)
2024	Ludogorets Razgrad II	3	(0)
2024–	Istra 1961	60	(2)
- * Club domestic league appearances and goals as of 1 June 2026

Marcel Heister (born 29 July 1992) is a German footballer who plays as a defender for SuperSport HNL club Osijek.

== Career ==
A native of Gammertingen, he played for the local side before moving to the bigger SSV Reutlingen 05, where he remained until he moved, at the age of 18, to the youth side of TSG Hoffenheim. He stayed there for two seasons, playing for the U19 and the reserve sides, before moving on to Croatia.

He joined the Prva HNL side NK Zadar in the summer of 2012, and made his debut on 1 September 2012, in the 1–1 home draw with Istra 1961, coming in the 80th minute for Mario Bilen. After scoring an own goal in the 4–1 home win against HNK Cibalia, he scored his first Prva HNL goal on 22 February 2013 in the 2–1 away loss to NK Zagreb, in a match where he was subsequently sent off. An offensively-oriented player at first, his position was eventually to left-back, albeit an offensively-oriented one.

In the summer of 2014, he transferred to NK Istra 1961.

In July 2016 Heister signed for Beitar Jerusalem. He departed the club at the end of the 2017–18 season.

=== Ferencváros ===
In July 2018 he signed for Ferencvárosi TC.

On 16 June 2020, he became champion with Ferencváros by beating Budapest Honvéd FC at the Hidegkuti Nándor Stadion on the 30th match day of the 2019–20 Nemzeti Bajnokság I season.

On 29 September 2020, he was member of the Ferencváros team which qualified for the 2020–21 UEFA Champions League group stage after beating Molde FK on 3-3 aggregate (away goals) at the Groupama Aréna.

=== Ludogorets Razgrad ===
In June 2023, Heister signed a contract with Bulgarian club Ludogorets Razgrad.

== Personal life ==
Heister is of partial Croatian and Danube Swabian descent, and his paternal grandparents Josef Heister and Danica Marić moved along with his father Lukas to Germany from Cerna, Croatia.

== Career statistics ==
=== Club ===
As of match played 14 September 2024

Appearances and goals by club, season and competition
Club	Season	League			National cup		Continental		Other		Total	
Club	Season	Division	Apps	Goals	Apps	Goals	Apps	Goals	Apps	Goals	Apps	Goals
TSG Hoffenheim II	2010-11	Regionalliga	1	0	—		—		—		1	0
TSG Hoffenheim II	2011-12	Regionalliga	25	0	—		—		—		25	0
TSG Hoffenheim II	Total		26	0	—		—		—		26	0
Zadar	2012-13	HNL	19	1	4	0	—		—		23	1
Zadar	2013-14	HNL	12	1	2	0	—		—		14	1
Zadar	Total		31	2	6	0	—		—		37	2
Istra	2013-14	HNL	7	0	1	0	—		—		8	0
Istra	2014-15	HNL	34	1	3	0	—		—		37	1
Istra	2015-16	HNL	30	2	2	1	—		1 (Note: Appearance(s) in Promotion/Relegation playoffs)	0	33	3
Istra	Total		71	3	6	1	—		1	0	78	4
Beitar Jerusalem	2016-17	Israeli Premier League	29	0	3	0	4 (Note: Appearance(s) in UEFA Europa League)	1	2 (Note: Appearance(s) in Toto Cup)	0	38	1
Beitar Jerusalem	2017-18	Israeli Premier League	22	3	2	0	4	0	3	0	31	3
Beitar Jerusalem	Total		51	3	5	0	8	1	5	0	69	4
Ferencváros	2018-19	Nemzeti Bajnokság I	31	1	4	0	1	0	—		36	1
Ferencváros	2019-20	Nemzeti Bajnokság I	16	0	—		9 (Note: Four appearances in UEFA Champions League, Five appearances in UEFA Europa League)	0	—		25	0
Ferencváros	2020-21	Nemzeti Bajnokság I	23	1	—		7 (Note: Appearance(s) in UEFA Champions League)	0	—		30	1
Ferencváros	Total		70	2	4	0	17	0	—		91	2
Fehérvár	2021-22	Nemzeti Bajnokság I	25	1	1	0	2 (Note: Appearance(s) in UEFA Europa Conference League)	1	—		28	2
Fehérvár	2022-23	Nemzeti Bajnokság I	27	0	1	1	5	0	—		33	1
Fehérvár	Total		52	1	2	1	7	1	—		61	3
Ludogorets	2023-24	Parva Liga	6	0	—		8 (Note: Four appearances in UEFA Champions League, Four appearances in UEFA Europa League)	0	0	0	14	0
Ludogorets II	2023-24	Vtora liga	3	0	—		—		—		3	0
Istra	2024-25	HNL	4	1	1	0	—		—		5	1
Career Total			314	12	23	2	40	2	6	0	383	16

== Honours ==
Ferencváros

- Nemzeti Bajnokság I: 2018–19, 2019–20, 2020–21
