= Tomislav Duvnjak =

Croatian footballer

Personal information
- Date of birth: 5 February 2003 (age 23)
- Place of birth: Zagreb, Croatia
- Position: Midfielder

Team information
- Current team: Varaždin
- Number: 8

Youth career
- 2009–2010: NK Croatia Sesvete
- 2010–2020: Dinamo Zagreb

Senior career*
Years	Team	Apps	(Gls)
2020	Dinamo Zagreb	1	(0)
2020–2022	Dinamo Zagreb II	46	(0)
2022–2024	Istra 1961	12	(0)
2023–2024	→ Sesvete (loan)	27	(1)
2024–	Varaždin	63	(2)

International career^{‡}
2017	Croatia U14	2	(1)
2017–2018	Croatia U15	7	(1)
2018–2019	Croatia U16	10	(0)
2019–2020	Croatia U17	14	(2)
2021	Croatia U19	7	(0)
2022	Croatia U20	1	(0)
- * Club domestic league appearances and goals as of 15 June 2026 ‡ National team caps and goals as of 28 June 2022

Tomislav Duvnjak (born 5 February 2003) is a Croatian footballer who plays for Varaždin as a midfielder.

== Football career ==
On 24 July 2020 he played his first match for Dinamo Zagreb, coming on as a substitute for Lovro Majer in the 76th minute in a match against NK Varaždin.

After two years of playing for Dinamo's second-tier reserve team, Duvnjak moved to Istra 1961 in June 2022, having signed a contract until the summer of 2025.

== International career ==
Duvnjak has played internationally for Croatia at under-14, under-15, under-16, under-17, under-19 and under-20 levels.
