= Ivan Nekić =

Croatian footballer

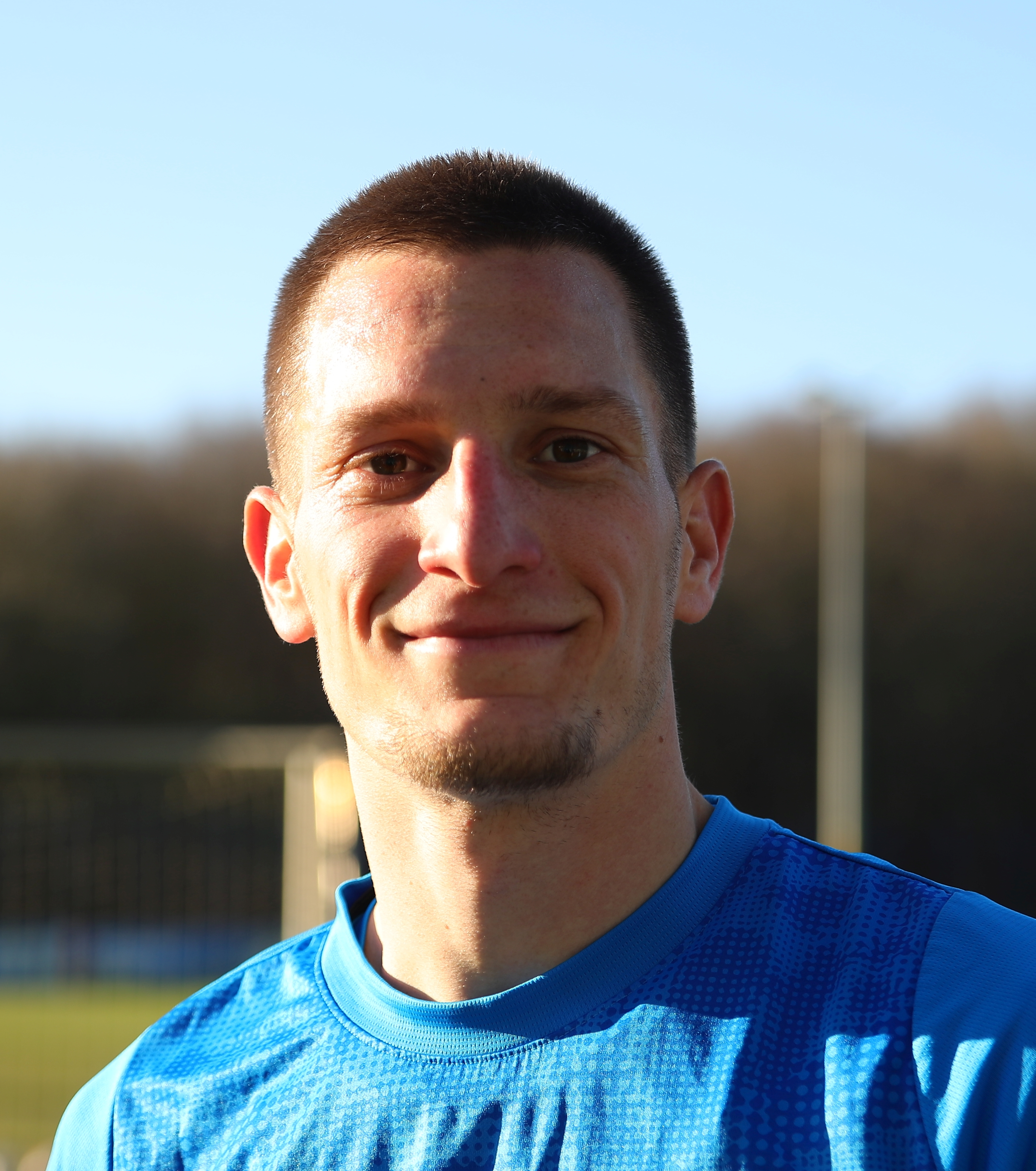
- Nekić in 2026

Personal information
- Date of birth: 24 December 2000 (age 25)
- Place of birth: Zadar, Croatia
- Height: 1.84 m (6 ft 0 in)
- Position: Centre-back

Team information
- Current team: Holstein Kiel
- Number: 13

Youth career
- 2009–2015: Zadar
- 2015–2017: Rijeka
- 2017: Inter Zaprešić

Senior career*
Years	Team	Apps	(Gls)
2017–2022	Inter Zaprešić	57	(1)
2022–2023	Sandecja Nowy Sącz	14	(0)
2023–2025	Varaždin	37	(0)
2025–	Holstein Kiel	20	(3)

International career
2016–2017	Croatia U17	8	(0)
- * Club domestic league appearances and goals as of 18 May 2026

Ivan Nekić (born 24 December 2000) is a Croatian professional footballer who plays as a centre-back for 2. Bundesliga club Holstein Kiel.

== Career ==
On 2 June 2022, Nekić signed a two-year deal with Polish I liga side Sandecja Nowy Sącz, with a one-year extension option.

He joined Bundesliga club Holstein Kiel in January 2025, becoming the club's third defensive signing of the winter transfer window.

== Career statistics ==
As of match played 18 May 2026

Appearances and goals by club, season and competition
Club	Season	League			National cup (Note: Includes Croatian Cup, Polish Cup, DFB-Pokal)		Other		Total	
Club	Season	League	Apps	Goals	Apps	Goals	Apps	Goals	Apps	Goals
Inter Zaprešić	2017–18	Croatian Football League	2	0	—		—		2	0
Inter Zaprešić	2018–19	Croatian Football League	3	0	—		—		3	0
Inter Zaprešić	2019–20	Croatian Football League	4	0	0	0	—		4	0
Inter Zaprešić	2020–21	First Football League	27	0	1	0	—		28	0
Inter Zaprešić	2021–22	First Football League	21	1	1	0	—		22	1
Inter Zaprešić	Total		57	1	2	0	—		59	1
Sandecja Nowy Sącz	2022–23	I liga	14	0	2	0	—		16	0
Varaždin	2023–24	Croatian Football League	19	0	2	0	—		21	0
Varaždin	2024–25	Croatian Football League	18	0	1	0	—		19	0
Varaždin	Total		37	0	3	0	—		40	0
Holstein Kiel	2024–25	Bundesliga	1	0	—		—		1	0
Holstein Kiel	2025–26	2. Bundesliga	19	3	4	0	—		23	3
Holstein Kiel	Total		20	3	4	0	—		24	3
Career total			128	4	11	0	0	0	139	4
