= Leon Belcar =

Croatian footballer

Personal information
- Date of birth: 4 January 2002 (age 24)
- Place of birth: Varaždin, Croatia
- Height: 1.86 m (6 ft 1 in)
- Position: Defensive midfielder

Team information
- Current team: Lokomotiva Zagreb
- Number: 28

Youth career
- –2012: Varaždin
- 2012–2013: Dinamo Zagreb
- 2013–2021: Varaždin

Senior career*
Years	Team	Apps	(Gls)
2021–2026	Varaždin	96	(9)
2025	→ Dinamo Zagreb (loan)	2	(0)
2026–	Lokomotiva Zagreb	22	(3)

International career^{‡}
2022	Croatia U20	5	(0)
2024	Croatia U21	6	(0)
- * Club domestic league appearances and goals as of 22 October 2026 ‡ National team caps and goals as of 20 March 2025

Leon Belcar (born 4 January 2002) is a Croatian footballer who plays as a defensive midfielder for the HNL club Lokomotiva Zagreb.

== Club career ==
Dinamo Zagreb signed Belcar on a loan in February 2025 with the option to buy him permanently at the end of the season. The coach of Dinamo Zagreb, Fabio Cannavaro, chose Belcar to replace injured midfielder Josip Mišić

== Career statistics ==
As of match played 15 March 2025

Appearances and goals by club, season and competition
Club	Season	League			Cup		Europe		Other		Total	
Club	Season	Division	Apps	Goals	Apps	Goals	Apps	Goals	Apps	Goals	Apps	Goals
Varaždin	2020–21	Croatian Football League	0	0	1	0	—		—		1	0
Varaždin	2021–22	First Football League	17	1	2	0	—		—		19	1
Varaždin	2022–23	Croatian Football League	16	0	1	0	—		—		17	0
Varaždin	2023–24	Croatian Football League	27	4	2	0	—		—		29	4
Varaždin	2024–25	Croatian Football League	20	3	—		—		—		20	3
Varaždin	Total		80	8	6	0	—		—		86	8
Dinamo Zagreb (loan)	2024–25	Croatian Football League	2	0	1	0	—		—		3	0
Career total			82	8	7	0	0	0	0	0	89	8
