= Ville Koski =

Finnish footballer (born 2002)

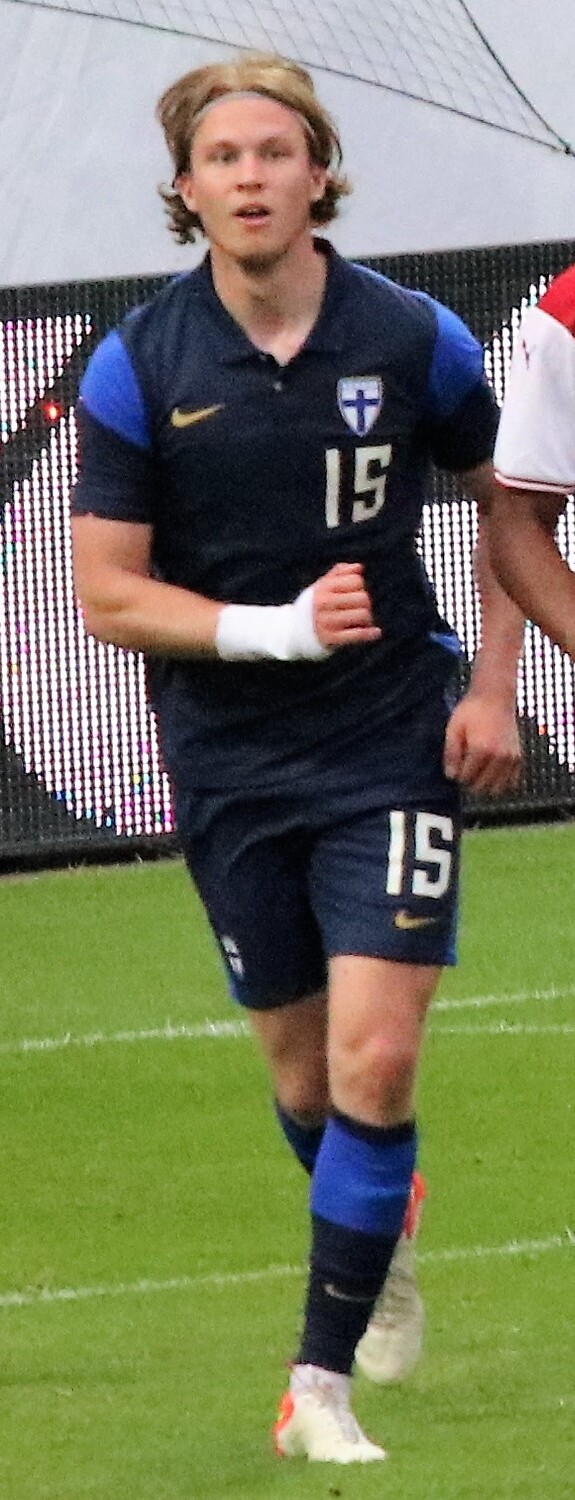
- Koski with Finland U21 in 2022

Personal information
- Full name: Ville Aleksi Jukanpoika Koski
- Date of birth: 27 January 2002 (age 24)
- Place of birth: Tuusula, Finland
- Height: 1.85 m (6 ft 1 in)
- Position: Centre-back

Team information
- Current team: Alavés
- Number: 16

Youth career
- TuPS
- –2018: PKKU

Senior career*
Years	Team	Apps	(Gls)
2018	PKKU	13	(0)
2019–2020	Honka II	27	(2)
2020–2023	Honka	67	(4)
2024–2026	Istra 1961	64	(0)
2026	→ Alavés (loan)	5	(0)
2026–	Alavés	9	(1)

International career^{‡}
2018–2019	Finland U17	7	(0)
2019	Finland U18	2	(0)
2021–2025	Finland U21	31	(1)
2023–	Finland	15	(0)
- * Club domestic league appearances and goals as of 19 October 2026 ‡ National team caps and goals as of 15 November 2026

Ville Aleksi Jukanpoika Koski (born 27 January 2002) is a Finnish professional footballer who plays as a centre back for La Liga club Deportivo Alavés and the Finland national team.

== Club career ==
=== PK Keski-Uusimaa ===
Born in Tuusula, Koski started playing football in the youth teams of local clubs Tuusulan Palloseura (TuPS) and PK Keski-Uusimaa. He made his senior debut with PK Keski-Uusimaa first team on 13 May 2018 at the age of 16, playing in the 1–1 draw against Jippo, in the third-tier league Kakkonen.

=== Honka ===
In 2019, he joined the FC Honka organisation in Espoo. He played with the club's reserve team Honka II in Kakkonen for two seasons, before he made his debut in the premier division Veikkausliiga on 12 September 2020, aged 18, with Honka first team, when he came in from the bench for the final minutes, in 1–3 away victory against Rovaniemen Palloseura (RoPS). Despite his young age, in the next season Koski quickly established his place in the starting line-up and became an integral part of the team's defense.

Koski scored his first goal in the league on 13 August 2022, in a 4–0 away win against Ilves.

=== Istra 1961 ===
In the early December 2023, it was announced that Koski had signed with Croatian premier division 1. HNL side Istra 1961 on a three-and-a-half-year deal. He was already close to sign with the club in the 2023 summer transfer window but the deal got cancelled then. The transfer was effective in January 2024.

=== Alavés ===
On 31 January 2026, Koski joined Spanish club Deportivo Alavés on loan for the remainder of the 2025–26 season. He made his La Liga debut on 13 March, in a 1–1 draw against Villarreal. Koski started his first game in La Liga on 13 May, playing full 90 minutes in a 1–0 home win over Barcelona.

On 15 June 2026, Koski signed a permanent five-year contract with Alavés for a €3 million fee. On 12 September, Koski scored his first goal for Alavés in away match against Racing de Santander, becoming the second Finnish player ever after Jari Litmanen to score in La Liga.

== International career ==
A regular Finnish youth international, Koski has represented Finland at various youth national team levels. He has also captained the Finland U21 national team. Koski was integral part of the Finland U21 team helping them to qualify for the 2025 UEFA European Under-21 Championship final tournament, for the second time in the nation's history.

Koski made his full international debut for Finland senior national team on 12 January 2023, in a friendly match against Estonia.

== Career statistics ==
=== Club ===
As of 19 October 2026

Appearances and goals by club, season and competition
Club	Season	Division	League		National cup (Note: Includes Suomen Cup and Croatian Football Cup)		League cup (Note: Includes Kakkonen Cup and Finnish League Cup)		Europe		Total	
Club	Season	Division	Apps	Goals	Apps	Goals	Apps	Goals	Apps	Goals	Apps	Goals
PK Keski-Uusimaa	2018	Kakkonen	13	0	—		—		—		13	0
Honka Akatemia	2019	Kakkonen	15	1	—		2	0	—		17	1
Honka Akatemia	2020	Kakkonen	12	1	—		3	0	—		15	1
Honka Akatemia	Total		27	2	0	0	5	0	0	0	32	2
Honka	2020	Veikkausliiga	1	0	0	0	—		0	0	1	0
Honka	2021	Veikkausliiga	17	0	2	0	—		4 (Note: Includes UEFA Europa Conference League)	0	23	0
Honka	2022	Veikkausliiga	24	2	0	0	2	0	—		26	2
Honka	2023	Veikkausliiga	25	2	2	0	3	0	2	0	32	2
Honka	Total		67	4	4	0	5	0	6	0	82	4
Istra 1961	2023–24	HNL	12	0	—		—		—		12	0
Istra 1961	2024–25	HNL	34	0	3	0	—		—		37	0
Istra 1961	2025–26	HNL	18	0	0	0	—		—		18	0
Istra 1961	Total		64	0	3	0	0	0	0	0	67	0
Alavés (loan)	2025–26	La Liga	5	0	0	0	—		—		5	0
Alavés	2026–27	La Liga	9	1	0	0	—		—		9	1
Career total			185	7	7	0	10	0	6	0	208	7

=== International ===
As of match played 15 November 2026

National team	Year	Competitive		Friendly		Total	
National team	Year	Apps	Goals	Apps	Goals	Apps	Goals
Finland	2023	0	0	1	0	1	0
Finland	2024	0	0	0	0	0	0
Finland	2025	4 (Note: Appearances in the 2026 FIFA World Cup qualification.)	0	2	0	6	0
Finland	2026	4 (Note: Appearances in the 2026–27 UEFA Nations League C.)	0	4 (Note: Includes two appearances in the 2026 FIFA Series.)	0	8	0
Total		8	0	7	0	15	0

== Honours ==
Honka

- Finnish League Cup: 2022
- Finnish Cup runner-up: 2023

Finland

- FIFA Series: 2026

Individual

- Football Association of Finland: U21 Player of the Year 2024
