= Giorgi Gagua =

Georgian footballer (born 2001)

Personal information
- Date of birth: 10 October 2001 (age 25)
- Place of birth: Tbilisi, Georgia
- Height: 1.93 m (6 ft 4 in)
- Position: Forward

Team information
- Current team: DAC 1904
- Number: 29

Youth career
- Iberia 2010
- Dinamo Tbilisi
- 2018–2019: Merani Tbilisi
- 2019–2020: Alavés

Senior career*
Years	Team	Apps	(Gls)
2020–2024	Alavés B	83	(16)
2022–2023	→ Real Unión (loan)	24	(2)
2024–2025	Istra 1961	28	(3)
2025–	DAC 1904	34	(6)

International career^{‡}
2018	Georgia U17	1	(0)
2019	Georgia U19	4	(1)
2021–2023	Georgia U21	14	(1)
2026–	Georgia	1	(0)
- * Club domestic league appearances and goals as of 21 September 2026 ‡ National team caps and goals as of 18 November 2026

Giorgi Gagua (Georgian: გიორგი გაგუა, romanized: giorgi gagua; born 10 October 2001) is a Georgian professional footballer who plays as a forward for Slovak club FC DAC 1904 Dunajská Streda and the Georgia national team.

== Club career ==
Born in Tbilisi, Gagua represented hometown sides Iberia 2010, FC Dinamo Tbilisi and FC Merani Tbilisi before moving to Spanish club Deportivo Alavés in October 2019. He made his senior debut with the reserves on 1 November 2020, coming on as a second-half substitute in a 3–0 Segunda División B away draw against Racing de Santander.

Gagua scored his first senior goal on 18 November 2020, netting the B's second in a 2–1 away win over Real Unión. The following 22 February, he renewed his contract with Alavés until 2024, and spent the 2021 pre-season with the first team.

On 8 August 2022, Gagua was loaned to the Txuri-beltz in Primera Federación for the season. Upon returning, he was assigned back at the B-side in Segunda Federación before moving to Croatian Football League side NK Istra 1961 on a three-year deal on 19 July 2024.

Gagua made his professional debut on 10 August 2024, replacing Moris Valinčić at half-time in a 2–1 home win over HNK Gorica.

On 24 July 2025 it was confirmed, that Gagua had joined Slovak First Football League side DAC 1904 on a deal until June 2028.

== Career statistics ==
=== International ===
As of match played 17 November 2026

Appearances and goals by national team and year
National team	Year	Apps	Goals
Georgia	2026	1	0
Total		1	0
