= Jakov-Anton Vasilj =

Croatian footballer

Personal information
- Date of birth: 2 June 2002 (age 24)
- Place of birth: Zadar, Croatia
- Position: Midfielder

Team information
- Current team: Lokomotiva Zagreb
- Number: 29

Youth career
- –2014: Zadar
- 2014–2017: Hajduk Split
- 2017–2021: Dinamo Zagreb

Senior career*
Years	Team	Apps	(Gls)
2021–2021	Dinamo Zagreb II	18	(3)
2021–2024	Dinamo Zagreb	1	(0)
2022–2023	→ Lokomotiva (loan)	33	(3)
2023–2024	→ Dubrava	5	(0)
2024	Šibenik	8	(1)
2025	Dinamo Zagreb	0	(0)
2025–	Lokomotiva Zagreb	33	(2)

International career^{‡}
2018–2019	Croatia U17	7	(3)
2021	Croatia U21	1	(0)
- * Club domestic league appearances and goals as of 15 June 2026 ‡ National team caps and goals as of 23:18, 25 December 2021 (UTC)

Jakov-Anton Vasilj (born 2 June 2002) is a Croatian professional footballer who plays as a midfielder for Prva HNL club Lokomotiva Zagreb.

== Personal life ==
Vasilj is the brother of fellow professional footballer Ivan-Anton Vasilj.

== Career statistics ==
=== Club ===
As of 25 December 2021

Club	Season	League			Cup		Continental		Other		Total	
Club	Season	Division	Apps	Goals	Apps	Goals	Apps	Goals	Apps	Goals	Apps	Goals
Dinamo Zagreb II	2020–21	Druga HNL	5	0	0	0	—		—		5	0
Dinamo Zagreb II	2021–22	Druga HNL	13	3	0	0	—		—		13	3
Dinamo Zagreb II	Total		18	3	0	0	0	0	0	0	18	3
Dinamo Zagreb	2020–21	Prva HNL	1	0	0	0	0	0	0	0	1	0
Dinamo Zagreb	2021–22	Prva HNL	0	0	0	0	1 (Note: Appearances in UEFA Champions League qualification)	0	0	0	1	0
Dinamo Zagreb	Total		1	0	0	0	1	0	0	0	2	0
Career total			19	3	0	0	1	0	0	0	20	3
