= Feta Fetai =

Albanian footballer (born 2005)

Personal information
- Date of birth: 11 May 2005 (age 21)
- Place of birth: Skopje, Macedonia (now North Macedonia)
- Height: 1.72 m (5 ft 8 in)
- Positions: Central midfielder; defensive midfielder

Team information
- Current team: Lokomotiva
- Number: 6

Youth career
- 2012–2020: Shkupi
- 2020–2022: Rabotnički

Senior career*
Years	Team	Apps	(Gls)
2022–2023	Rabotnički	13	(0)
2023–	Lokomotiva	59	(0)
2025–2026	→ Sharjah (loan)	5	(0)

International career^{‡}
2023	North Macedonia U18	3	(0)
2023	North Macedonia U19	3	(0)
2024–	Albania U21	3	(0)
2026–	Albania	1	(0)
- * Club domestic league appearances and goals as of 21 November 2026 ‡ National team caps and goals as of 15 November 2026

Feta Fetai (Macedonian: Фета Фетаи; born 11 May 2005) is a professional footballer who plays as a central midfielder for Croatian Football League club Lokomotiva Zagreb. Born in Macedonia, he represents the Albania national team.

== Club career ==
Fetai is a youth product of Shkupi, before finishing his development at the youth academy of Rabotnički in 2020. He debuted with Rabotnički in the Macedonian First Football League in November 2022, and on 11 February 2023 signed a professional contract with the club for 4 seasons. On 1 July 2023, he transferred to the Croatian Football League club Lokomotiva Zagreb.

== International career ==
Born in North Macedonia, Fetai is of Albanian descent. He is a former youth international for North Macedonia having played for their U18s and U19s. In 2024, he was approached to represent Albania and he debuted for the Albania U21s. On 8 October 2024, he received his first callup to the senior Albania national team for a set of 2024–25 UEFA Nations League matches.

=== International ===
As of match played 15 November 2026

Appearances and goals by national team and year
National team	Year	Apps	Goals
Albania
Albania	2026	1	0
Total		1	0
