= Moris Valinčić =

Croatian footballer

Personal information
- Date of birth: 17 November 2002 (age 23)
- Place of birth: Rijeka, Croatia
- Height: 1.80 m (5 ft 11 in)
- Position: Right-back

Team information
- Current team: Dinamo Zagreb
- Number: 25

Youth career
- –2018: Rijeka
- 2018: Opatija
- 2018–2021: Dinamo Zagreb

Senior career*
Years	Team	Apps	(Gls)
2020	Dinamo Zagreb II	1	(0)
2021–2022	Neretvanac Opuzen	15	(2)
2022–2023	Široki Brijeg	38	(0)
2023–2025	Istra 1961	56	(2)
2025–	Dinamo Zagreb	36	(0)

International career^{‡}
2017	Croatia U15	2	(0)
2023–2024	Croatia U21	7	(0)
- * Club domestic league appearances and goals as of 27 October 2026 ‡ National team caps and goals as of 19 August 2025

Moris Valinčić (born 22 November 2002, in Rijeka) is a Croatian professional footballer who plays as a right-back for Croatian club Dinamo Zagreb.

Moris was written off as 19-year old from Dinamo Zagreb and consequently joined Neretvanac Opuzen in the fourth tier of the Croatian football pyramid. In the summer of 2025, after stints with Neretvanac Opuzen, Široki Brijeg and Istra 1961, Moris rejoined Dinamo Zagreb.

== Career statistics ==
As of match played 27 October 2026

Appearances and goals by club, season and competition
Club	Season	League			Cup		Europe		Other		Total	
Club	Season	Division	Apps	Goals	Apps	Goals	Apps	Goals	Apps	Goals	Apps	Goals
Dinamo Zagreb II	2020–21	Croatian First Football League	1	0	—		—		—		1	0
Neretvanac Opuzen	2021–22	Croatian Third Football League	15	2	1	0	—		—		16	2
Široki Brijeg	2021–22	Premijer Liga BiH	10	0	2	0	—		—		12	0
Široki Brijeg	2022–23	Premijer Liga BiH	28	0	2	0	—		—		30	0
Široki Brijeg	Total		38	0	4	0	—		—		42	0
Istra 1961	2023–24	Croatian Football League	23	1	1	0	—		—		24	1
Istra 1961	2024–25	Croatian Football League	33	1	4	0	—		—		37	1
Istra 1961	Total		56	2	5	0	—		—		61	2
Dinamo Zagreb	2025–26	Croatian Football League	27	0	2	0	5 (Note: Appearances in UEFA Europa League)	0	—		34	0
Dinamo Zagreb	2026–27	Croatian Football League	9	0	1	0	8 (Note: Six appearances and one goal in UEFA Champions League, two appearances in UEFA Europa League)	1	—		18	1
Dinamo Zagreb	Total		36	0	3	0	13	1	—		52	1
Career total			146	4	13	0	13	1	0	0	172	5
