= Marijan Ćorić =

Croatian footballer (born 1995)

Personal information
- Full name: Marijan Ćorić
- Date of birth: 6 February 1995 (age 31)
- Place of birth: Čapljina, Bosnia and Herzegovina
- Height: 2.04 m (6 ft 8 in)
- Position: Goalkeeper

Team information
- Current team: Llapi
- Number: 1

Youth career
- –2006: Vodnjan
- 2006–2014: Istra 1961
- 2013–2014: → Parma (loan)

Senior career*
Years	Team	Apps	(Gls)
2014–2015	Parma	0	(0)
2015–2016	Spezia	0	(0)
2016–2017	Parma	2	(0)
2017–2018	Istra 1961	12	(0)
2018–2019	Kustošija	0	(0)
2019	Palanga	8	(0)
2019–2020	Uljanik Pula	8	(0)
2020	TEC	1	(0)
2021–2022	Llapi	29	(0)
2022–2023	Opatija	7	(0)
2023–2025	Istra 1961	7	(0)
2025–	Llapi	44	(0)

International career
2011	Croatia U17	2	(0)
2014	Croatia U19	1	(0)
- * Club domestic league appearances and goals as of 1 June 2026

Marijan Ćorić (born 6 February 1995) is a Croatian footballer who plays as a goalkeeper for Kosovo Superleague club Llapi.

== Club career ==
=== TEC ===
On 29 April 2020, Ćorić joined Tweede Divisie side TEC and this transfer would become legally effective in July 2020. On 6 September 2020, he made his debut in a 1–2 home defeat against Koninklijke HFC after being named in the starting line-up.

=== Llapi ===
On 5 January 2021, Ćorić signed a six-months contract with Kosovo Superleague club Llapi. On 9 February 2021, he made his debut with Llapi in the 2020–21 Kosovar Cup round of 16 against Ballkani after being named in the starting line-up. Four days later, Ćorić made his league debut in a 0–1 away defeat against Drita after being named in the starting line-up.

== International career ==
Ćorić was born in Čapljina, Bosnia and Herzegovina and raised in Croatia. He was eligible for Croatia internationally, as well as Bosnia and Herzegovina, his birthplace. From 2011, until 2014, Ćorić has been part of Croatia at youth international level, respectively has been part of the U17 and U19 teams and he with these teams played three matches.
