= Salim Fago Lawal =

Nigerian striker (born 2003)

Personal information
- Date of birth: January 15, 2003 (age 23)
- Place of birth: Lagos, Nigeria
- Height: 1.84 m (6 ft 0 in)
- Position: Forward

Team information
- Current team: Viktoria Plzeň
- Number: 70

Youth career
- 2019 - 2022: Springsoca United Academy
- –2022: Mavlon FC

Senior career*
| Years | Team | Apps | (Gls) |
| 2022–2023 | Mavlon FC | 0 | (0) |
| 2023–2026 | Istra 1961 | 57 | (11) |
| 2026– | Viktoria Plzeň | 10 | (2) |

International career^{‡}
| 2023 | Nigeria U20 | 5 | (1) |
| 2025– | Nigeria | 2 | (0) |
Medal record
Men's football
Representing Nigeria
Africa Cup of Nations
| Third place | 2025 Morocco |
- * Club domestic league appearances and goals as of 5 September 2026 ‡ National team caps and goals as of 30 December 2025

Salim Fago Lawal (born January 15, 2003) is a Nigerian professional footballer who plays as a forward for Czech First League club Viktoria Plzeň and the Nigeria national team.

== Club career ==
On 1 August 2023, Lawal signed a contract with HNL club Istra 1961 until 2026. He made his debut on 6 August 2023 against Rijeka. On 17 June 2025, he extended his contract with Istra 1961 until 2028.

On 27 January 2026, Lawal signed a contract with Czech First League club Viktoria Plzeň until 2029.

== International career ==
Lawal was first called up to the Nigeria for the 2025 Africa Cup of Nations on 11 December 2025. He made his international debut for Nigeria on 16 December 2025 in a friendly match against Egypt.

=== Youth Career ===
Salim played his youth football at Springsoca United Academy between 2019 and 2022 where he honed his skills. In a 2022 news publication, he was described by Springsoca United Academy Sporting Director as a promising player who possesses a physical presence and technical ability required to succeed.

== Honours ==
Nigeria

- Africa Cup of Nations third place: 2025
