= Danijel Djuric =

Icelandic footballer

Personal information
- Full name: Danijel Dejan Djuric
- Date of birth: 5 January 2003 (age 23)
- Place of birth: Varna, Bulgaria
- Height: 1.75 m (5 ft 9 in)
- Positions: Forward; winger

Team information
- Current team: KA Akureyri
- Number: 14

Youth career
- 2008–2012: Hvöt Blönduós
- 2012–2019: Breiðablik
- 2019–2022: FC Midtjylland

Senior career*
Years	Team	Apps	(Gls)
2022–2025	Víkingur Reykjavík	65	(24)
2025	Istra 1961	16	(0)
2026–	KA Akureyri	25	(0)

International career^{‡}
2017–2018	Iceland U15	4	(4)
2018–2019	Iceland U16	10	(1)
2018–2020	Iceland U17	19	(11)
2019	Iceland U18	2	(2)
2019–2022	Iceland U19	11	(0)
2022–2024	Iceland U21	10	(1)
2022–	Iceland	3	(0)
- * Club domestic league appearances and goals as of 16 November 2026 ‡ National team caps and goals as of 17 February 2025

Danijel Dejan Djuric (born 5 January 2003) is an Icelandic professional footballer who plays as a forward for Icelandic club KA Akureyri. Born in Bulgaria, he plays for the Iceland national team.

== Club career ==
Born in Bulgaria to a Bulgarian mother and Serbian father, Djuric moved to Iceland aged two. His first youth club was Hvöt from Blönduós, before joining Breiðablik when his family moved to Kópavogur in 2012. In 2019, he transferred to the youth side of Danish club FC Midtjylland.

In July 2022, Djuric started his senior career when he transferred to Víkingur Reykjavík from Midtjylland.

He transferred to Croatian club Istra 1961 in February 2025.

== International career ==
He has featured for the U15, U16, U17, U18, U19 and U21 youth teams of Iceland. He made his debut with the senior team in a friendly match against South Korea on 11 November 2022, playing the first 73 minutes.

== Honours ==
Víkingur Reykjavík

- Icelandic League: 2023
- Icelandic Cup: 2022, 2023
- Icelandic Super Cup: 2024
