= Stadion Rujevica =

Stadium in Rijeka, Croatia

Stadion HNK Rijeka
- Rujevica
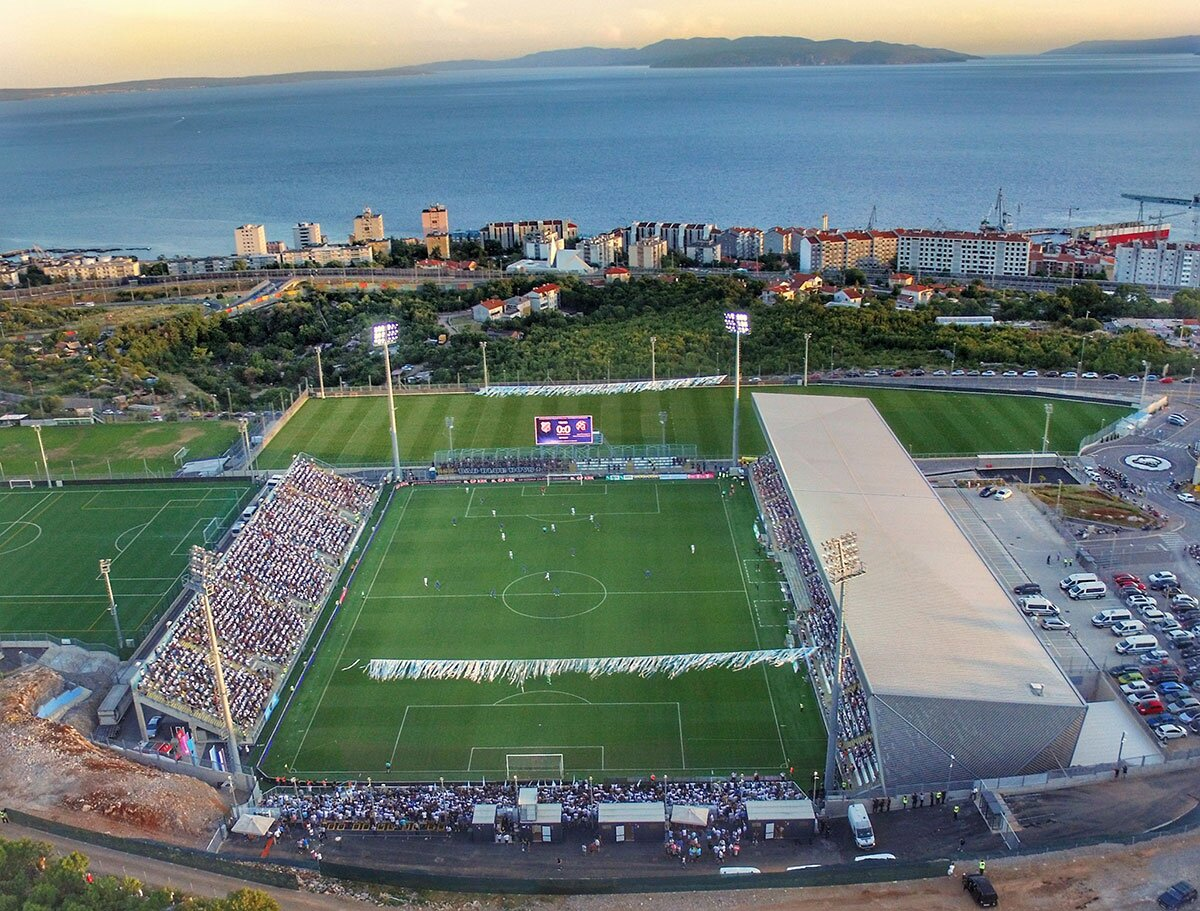
- Interactive map of Stadion HNK Rijeka
- Location: Rijeka, Croatia
- Coordinates: 45°20′52″N 14°24′08″E
- Owner: HNK Rijeka
- Operator: HNK Rijeka
- Capacity: 8,279
- Surface: Mixto Hybrid Grass
- Scoreboard: LED 80m²
- Record attendance: 8,279
- Field size: 105 × 68 metres

Construction
- Groundbreaking: 15 September 2014
- Opened: 2 August 2015
- Expanded: July 2017
- Cost: €24 million

Tenants
- HNK Rijeka (2015–present); Croatia national football team (2016–present)

Website
- nk-rijeka.hr/hnk-rijeka/kamp/

Stadion Rujevica (English: Rujevica Stadium), officially known as Stadion HNK Rijeka (English: HNK Rijeka Stadium), is a stadium in the city of Rijeka, Croatia. The stadium is commonly referred to as Rujevica after its location. From August 2015, the stadium is a temporary home ground for HNK Rijeka during construction of the new Stadion Kantrida. The stadium is part of the training camp used by the club's youth academy, which includes four additional fields. Once the new Kantrida is built, the stadium will be used as the club's training ground.

== Construction ==
The construction of the training centre commenced on 15 September 2014 and was financed by the owners of HNK Rijeka. On 28 July 2015, the stadium was issued a licence from the Croatian football authorities. It was officially opened on 2 August 2015 with HNK Rijeka's 3–1 win against NK Lokomotiva. Marin Leovac scored the first goal.

== Expansion ==
In January and November 2016, HNK Rijeka Chairman Damir Mišković hinted that the northern stand may be built in order to comply with UEFA stadium categories requirement for the group stages of the UEFA Champions League and UEFA Europa League to have a stadium with the minimum capacity of 8,000. The construction of the northern stand broke ground on 11 May 2017. The construction was completed on 21 July 2017, increasing the total capacity of the stadium from 6,039 to 8,279.

== Capacity per sector ==
Four sectors contribute to the total seating capacity of 8,279:

- Sector I (east): 2,852
- Sector Z (west): 2,775 (including VIP sector)
- Sector S (north): 2,240
- Sector J (south): 412 (away supporters' sector)

== League attendance ==
This is a list of HNK Rijeka's league attendance at Rujevica by season.

Season	Total	High	Low	Average
2015–16	71,682	5,776	2,522	4,217
2016–17	85,628	6,004	3,022	4,757
2017–18	87,301	7,258	3,022	4,850
2018–19	81,463	7,122	2,846	4,526
2019–20	73,598	7,326	2,071	4,329
2020–21	4,347	2,275	2,072	2,173
2021–22	64,576	7,485	1,652	3,798
2022–23	88,116	8,191	3,000	4,895
2023–24	115,310	8,118	4,054	6,406
2024–25	96,741	8,187	3,172	5,374
2025–26	96,874	7,665	3,431	5,382

== International matches ==
Date	Competition	Opponent	Score	Att.	Ref
Croatia national football team
4 June 2016	Friendly	San Marino	10–0	3,911	
6 October 2017	2018 FIFA World Cup qualifiers	Finland	1–1	7,578	
12 October 2018	2018–19 UEFA Nations League	England	0–0	0 (Note: Played behind closed doors.)	
15 October 2018	Friendly	Jordan	2–1	4,820	
16 November 2019	UEFA Euro 2020 qualifiers	Slovakia	3–1	8,212	
27 March 2021	2022 FIFA World Cup qualifiers	Cyprus	1–0	0	
30 March 2021	2022 FIFA World Cup qualifiers	Malta	3–0	0	
8 September 2023	UEFA Euro 2024 qualifiers	Latvia	5–0	8,152	
3 June 2024	Friendly	North Macedonia	3–0	8,030	
15 November 2025	2026 FIFA World Cup qualifiers	Faroe Islands	3–1	7,846	
2 June 2026	Friendly	Belgium	0–2	7,555	
3 October 2026	2026–27 UEFA Nations League	England	0–7	6,342	
