= Logi Hrafn Róbertsson =

Icelandic footballer

Personal information
- Date of birth: 22 July 2004 (age 22)
- Height: 1.87 m (6 ft 2 in)
- Position: Defensive midfielder

Team information
- Current team: Värnamo
- Number: 23

Youth career
- 2009–2019: FH

Senior career*
Years	Team	Apps	(Gls)
2019–2024	FH	79	(2)
2025–2026	Istra 1961	15	(0)
2026–	Värnamo	17	(3)

International career^{‡}
2019–2020	Iceland U17	7	(0)
2021–2023	Iceland U19	11	(0)
2022–	Iceland U21	7	(0)
2024–	Iceland	1	(0)
- * Club domestic league appearances and goals as of 12 November 2026 ‡ National team caps and goals as of 17 January 2024

Logi Hrafn Róbertsson (born 22 July 2004) is an Icelandic football player who plays as a defensive midfielder for Superettan club Värnamo, and the Iceland national team.

== International career ==
Logi Hrafn represented Iceland at the 2023 UEFA European Under-19 Championship.

Logi Hrafn made his debut for the senior Iceland national team on 17 January 2024 in a friendly against Honduras.
