= Beyatt Lekweiry =

Mauritanian footballer

Personal information
- Date of birth: 11 April 2005 (age 21)
- Place of birth: Nouadhibou, Mauritania
- Height: 1.71 m (5 ft 7 in)
- Position: Midfielder

Team information
- Current team: Lausanne-Sport
- Number: 27

Youth career
- –2020: Nouadhibou

Senior career*
Years	Team	Apps	(Gls)
2020–2021	Nouadhibou		
2021–2024	Douanes		
2024–2025	Istra 1961	16	(3)
2025–	Lausanne-Sport	45	(4)

International career^{‡}
2022–	Mauritania	12	(0)
- * Club domestic league appearances and goals as of 28 September 2026 ‡ National team caps and goals as of 01:38, 19 December 2025 (UTC)

Beyatt Lekweiry (born 11 April 2005) is a Mauritanian professional footballer who plays as a midfielder for the Swiss club Lausanne-Sport and the Mauritania national team.

== Club career ==
As a youth, Lekweiry played for hometown club Nouadhibou of the Mauritian Premier League. In 2021 he joined AS Douanes on loan for the season. At the time he was considered by Mauritanian media outlets to be one of the greatest footballing prospects in the country.

== International career ==
Lekweiry was a standout player for Mauritania at the 2020 U-20 Arab Cup at age 15. The following year he was selected to represent Mauritania in the 2021 Africa U-20 Cup of Nations but missed the tournament because of injury.

In January 2022, Lekweiry was named to his nation's senior squad for the 2021 Africa Cup of Nations for his first senior call-up. At 16 years old, he was the youngest player at the tournament. He went on to make his senior debut in the team's final match of the Group Stage, coming on as a substitute against Mali on 20 January 2022.

== Career statistics ==
As of match played 19 December 2025

Appearances and goals by national team and year
National team	Year	Apps	Goals
Mauritania	2022	1	0
Mauritania	2024	4	0
Mauritania	2025	7	0
Total		12	0
