= Mateo Lisica =

Croatian footballer (born 2003)

Personal information
- Date of birth: 9 July 2003 (age 23)
- Place of birth: Pula, Croatia
- Height: 1.78 m (5 ft 10 in)
- Position: Winger

Team information
- Current team: Dinamo Zagreb
- Number: 21

Youth career
- –2020: Istra 1961

Senior career*
Years	Team	Apps	(Gls)
2020–2025	Istra 1961	128	(9)
2025–	Dinamo Zagreb	32	(2)

International career^{‡}
2019	Croatia U16	2	(0)
2021	Croatia U18	2	(0)
2021	Croatia U19	6	(1)
2023–2024	Croatia U20	2	(0)
2023–2024	Croatia U21	4	(0)
- * Club domestic league appearances and goals as of 10 October 2026 ‡ National team caps and goals as of 25 May 2024

Mateo Lisica (born 9 July 2003) is a Croatian professional football player who plays for Dinamo Zagreb.

== Club career ==
Mateo Lisica made his professional debut for NK Istra 1961 on the 30 June 2020.

== Career statistics ==
As of match played 10 October 2026

Appearances and goals by club, season and competition
Club	Season	League			Cup (Note: Includes Croatian Football Cup)		Europe		Other		Total	
Club	Season	Division	Apps	Goals	Apps	Goals	Apps	Goals	Apps	Goals	Apps	Goals
Istra 1961	2019–20	Croatian Football League	4	0	—		—		0	0	4	0
Istra 1961	2020–21	Croatian Football League	17	0	2	0	—		—		19	0
Istra 1961	2021–22	Croatian Football League	28	2	3	0	—		—		31	2
Istra 1961	2022–23	Croatian Football League	17	0	0	0	—		—		17	0
Istra 1961	2023–24	Croatian Football League	26	3	1	0	—		—		27	3
Istra 1961	2024–25	Croatian Football League	36	4	3	1	—		—		39	5
Istra 1961	Total		128	9	9	1	—		—		137	10
Dinamo Zagreb	2025–26	Croatian Football League	24	2	4	1	7 (Note: Appearances in UEFA Europa League)	1	—		35	4
Dinamo Zagreb	2026–27	Croatian Football League	8	0	1	0	7 (Note: Six appearances and two goals in UEFA Champions League, one appearance in UEFA Europa League)	2	—		16	2
Dinamo Zagreb	Total		32	2	5	1	14	3	—		51	6
Career total			159	11	12	2	14	3	0	0	185	16
