= Stadion Aldo Drosina =

Stadium in Pula, Croatia

Coordinates: 44.86157°N 13.8517°E

- Aldo Drosina
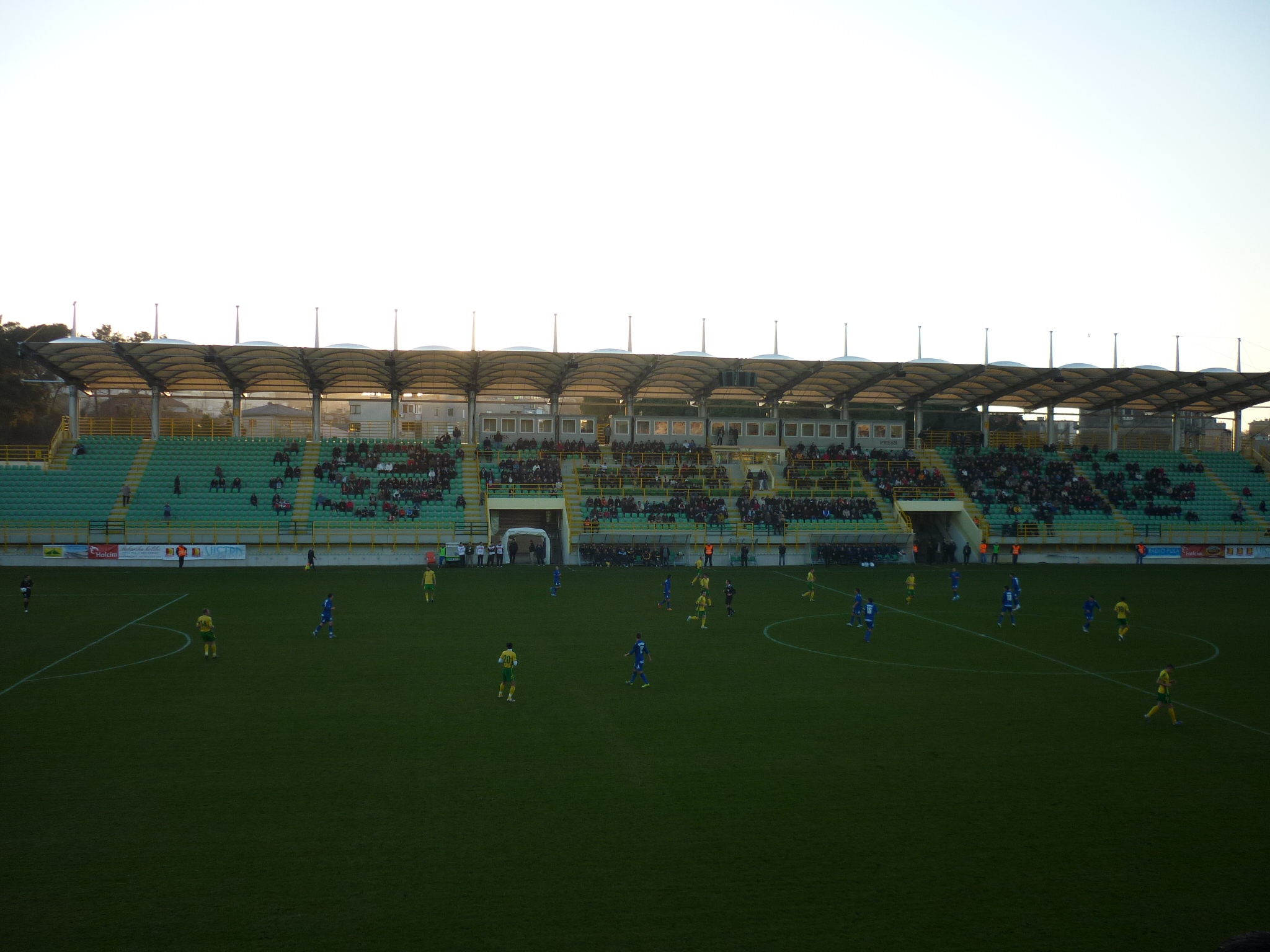
- Interactive map of Stadion Aldo Drosina
- Full name: Stadion Aldo Drosina
- Former names: Gradski stadion
- Location: Pula, Croatia
- Owner: City of Pula
- Capacity: 10,000
- Surface: Hybrid grass

Construction
- Built: 1994
- Renovated: 2011

Tenants
- NK Istra 1961 (1994–present); Croatia national football team (2011–present)

Stadion Aldo Drosina (Italian: Stadio Aldo Drosina) is a multi-use stadium in Pula, Croatia. It is currently used mostly for football matches and is the home ground of NK Istra 1961 and NK Istra. The stadium has a capacity of 10,000. From March 2009 to January 2011 the stadium underwent a major reconstruction. The west stand was completely demolished and redesigned, and a roof was added over the west stand. New seats replaced bench seating all around the stadium, and the three existing stands were cleaned up. On 9 February 2011, Croatia hosted the Czech Republic in an international football friendly for the inaugural match to open the stadium. The match finished with a 4–2 win for Croatia.

The stadium is named after Aldo Drosina (1932–2000), a noted football player and coach from Pula.

== International matches ==
Date	Competition	Opponent	Score	Att.	Ref
Croatia national football team
29 May 1998	Friendly	Slovakia	1–2	10,360	
9 February 2011	Friendly	Czech Republic	4–2	8,062	
25 May 2012	Friendly	Estonia	3–1	7,668	
4 September 2014	Friendly	Cyprus	2–0	6,000	
19 November 2019	Friendly	Georgia	2–1	5,072	
