= 2024–25 Croatian Football League =

SuperSport Hrvatska nogometna liga
- Season: 2024–25
- Dates: 2 August 2024 – 25 May 2025
- Champions: HNK Rijeka (2nd title)
- Relegated: HNK Šibenik
- Champions League: HNK Rijeka
- Europa League: Dinamo Zagreb
- Conference League: Hajduk Split; Varaždin
- Matches: 180
- Goals: 424 (2.36 per match)
- Top goalscorer: Marko Livaja (19 goals)
- Biggest home win: Dinamo Zagreb 5–0 Istra 1961 (2 August 2024); Dinamo Zagreb 5–0 Slaven Belupo (10 May 2025)
- Biggest away win: Šibenik 0–4 Dinamo Zagreb (1 November 2024); Šibenik 0–4 Dinamo Zagreb (17 April 2025)
- Highest scoring: Dinamo Zagreb 5–1 Lokomotiva (28 September 2024); Dinamo Zagreb 2–4 Osijek (27 October 2024); Istra 3–3 Šibenik (14 December 2024)
- Longest winning run: 4 matches Dinamo Zagreb
- Longest unbeaten run: 19 matches Rijeka
- Longest winless run: 11 matches Šibenik
- Longest losing run: 5 matches Osijek
- Highest attendance: 33,502
- Lowest attendance: 288
- Total attendance: 1,020,397
- Average attendance: 5,669

The 2024–25 Croatian Football League (officially SuperSport Hrvatska nogometna liga for sponsorship reasons) was the 34th season of the Croatian top division football, the national championship for men's association football teams in Croatia, since its establishment in 1992. The season began on 2 August 2024.

The league was contested by ten teams.

== Teams ==
The following teams will compete in the 2024–25 HNL.

=== Changes ===
Šibenik (promoted after a one-year absence) was promoted from the 2023–24 Prva NL. Rudeš (relegated after one season in the top flight) was relegated to 2024–25 Prva NL.

=== Stadia and locations ===
Dinamo Zagreb	Gorica	Hajduk Split	Istra 1961
Stadion Maksimir	Gradski stadion Velika Gorica	Stadion Poljud	Stadion Aldo Drosina
Capacity: 24,851	Capacity: 8,000	Capacity: 33,987	Capacity: 10,000
Lokomotiva	Locations of teams in 2024–25 HNL		Osijek
Stadion Kranjčevićeva	Locations of teams in 2024–25 HNL		Opus Arena
Capacity: 5,350	Locations of teams in 2024–25 HNL		Capacity: 13,005
Rijeka	Slaven Belupo	Šibenik	Varaždin
Stadion Rujevica	Stadion Ivan Kušek-Apaš	Stadion Šubićevac	Stadion Varteks
Capacity: 8,191	Capacity: 3,054	Capacity: 3,701	Capacity: 8,818

Team	City	Stadium	Capacity	Ref.
Dinamo Zagreb	Zagreb	Maksimir	24,851	
Gorica	Velika Gorica	ŠRC Velika Gorica	8,000	
Hajduk Split	Split	Poljud	33,987	
Istra 1961	Pula	Stadion Aldo Drosina	10,000	
Lokomotiva	Zagreb	Kranjčevićeva^{1}	3,690	
Osijek	Osijek	Opus Arena	13,005	
Rijeka	Rijeka	Rujevica	8,191	
Slaven Belupo	Koprivnica	Stadion Ivan Kušek-Apaš	3,054	
Šibenik	Šibenik	Šubićevac	3,701	
Varaždin	Varaždin	Stadion Varteks	8,818	

- ^{1} Lokomotiva host their home matches at Stadion Kranjčevićeva. The stadium is originally the home ground of fifth-level side NK Zagreb.

Rank	Counties of Croatia	Number of teams	Club(s)
1	City of Zagreb	2	Dinamo Zagreb, Lokomotiva
2	Istria	1	Istra 1961
2	Koprivnica-Križevci	1	Slaven Belupo
2	Osijek-Baranja	1	Osijek
2	Primorje-Gorski Kotar	1	Rijeka
2	Split-Dalmatia	1	Hajduk Split
2	Šibenik-Knin	1	Šibenik
2	Varaždin	1	Varaždin
2	Zagreb County	1	Gorica

=== Personnel and kits ===
Club	Manager	Captain	Kit manufacturer	Sponsors
Dinamo Zagreb	(Croatia) Sandro Perković (caretaker)	(North Macedonia) Arijan Ademi	Castore	Favbet
Gorica	(Croatia) Mario Carević	(Croatia) Filip Mrzljak	Alpas	Kömmerling
Hajduk Split	(Italy) Gennaro Gattuso	(Croatia) Lovre Kalinić	Adidas	Tommy
Istra 1961	(Spain) Gonzalo García	(Croatia) Slavko Blagojević	Joma	Germania
Lokomotiva	(Croatia) Mario Cvitanović	(Bosnia and Herzegovina) Mateo Marić	Macron	Favbet
Osijek	(Slovenia) Simon Rožman	(Croatia) Vedran Jugović	2Rule	Mészáros és Mészáros Kft.
Rijeka	(Montenegro) Radomir Đalović	(Bosnia and Herzegovina) Martin Zlomislić	Joma	Favbet
Slaven Belupo	(Croatia) Mario Kovačević	(Croatia) Tomislav Božić	Jako	Belupo
Šibenik	(Croatia) Rajko Vidović	(Croatia) Antonio Đaković	Capelli Sport	
Varaždin	(Croatia) Nikola Šafarić	(Croatia) Oliver Zelenika	Capelli Sport	BURAI

=== Managerial changes ===
Team	Outgoing manager	Manner of departure	Date of vacancy	Position in table	Replaced by	Date of appointment
Osijek	(Croatia) Ivo Smoje (caretaker)	End of caretaker spell	26 May 2024	Pre-season	(Italy) Federico Coppitelli	13 June 2024
Hajduk Split	(Bosnia and Herzegovina) Jure Ivanković (caretaker)	End of caretaker spell	26 May 2024	Pre-season	(Italy) Gennaro Gattuso	13 June 2024
Varaždin	(Croatia) Mario Kovačević	Contract expired	31 May 2024	Pre-season	(Croatia) Nikola Šafarić	31 May 2024
Rijeka	(Croatia) Željko Sopić	Sacked	13 August 2024	3rd	(Montenegro) Radomir Đalović	13 August 2024
Slaven Belupo	(Bosnia and Herzegovina) Ivan Radeljić	Sacked	2 September 2024	10th	(Croatia) Mario Kovačević	2 September 2024
Dinamo Zagreb	(Bosnia and Herzegovina) Sergej Jakirović	Sacked	19 September 2024	3rd	(Croatia) Sandro Perković (caretaker)	19 September 2024
Dinamo Zagreb	(Croatia) Sandro Perković (caretaker)	End of caretaker spell	26 September 2024	3rd	(Croatia) Nenad Bjelica	26 September 2024
Gorica	(Croatia) Rajko Vidović	Sacked	8 October 2024	8th	(Bosnia and Herzegovina) Mensur Mujdža (caretaker)	8 October 2024
Šibenik	(Croatia) Mario Carević	Mutual consent	10 October 2024	5th	(Croatia) Marko Kartelo (caretaker)	14 October 2024
Gorica	(Bosnia and Herzegovina) Mensur Mujdža (caretaker)	End of caretaker spell	15 October 2024	8th	(Croatia) Mario Carević	15 October 2024
Šibenik	(Croatia) Marko Kartelo (caretaker)	End of caretaker spell	10 October 2024	9th	(Croatia) Rajko Vidović	13 November 2024
Istra 1961	(Italy) Paolo Tramezzani	Sacked	22 December 2024	8th	(Spain) Gonzalo García	7 January 2025
Dinamo Zagreb	(Croatia) Nenad Bjelica	Sacked	29 December 2024	3rd	(Italy) Fabio Cannavaro	29 December 2024
Lokomotiva	(Croatia) Silvijo Čabraja	Mutual consent	19 March 2025	7th	(Croatia) Damir Ferenčina (caretaker)	19 March 2025
Osijek	(Italy) Federico Coppitelli	Sacked	19 March 2025	6th	(Slovenia) Simon Rožman	20 March 2025
Dinamo Zagreb	(Italy) Fabio Cannavaro	Sacked	9 April 2025	3rd	(Croatia) Sandro Perković (caretaker)	9 April 2025
Lokomotiva	(Croatia) Damir Ferenčina (caretaker)	End of caretaker spell	24 April 2025	9th	(Croatia) Mario Cvitanović	24 April 2025

== League table ==
Pos	Team	Pld	W	D	L	GF	GA	GD	Pts	Qualification or relegation (Note: The 2024–25 Croatian Football Cup winners qualify for the Europa League first qualifying round (or the second-placed team if the Croatian Cup winners finish first). If the Croatian Cup winners finish in the top three, the second Conference League second qualifying round spot will be passed to the fourth-placed team.)
1	Rijeka (C)	36	18	11	7	49	21	+28	65 (Note: Head to head points (GD) = Rijeka 5 (+3), Dinamo Zagreb 5 (-3).)	Qualification to Champions League second qualifying round
2	Dinamo Zagreb	36	19	8	9	69	41	+28	65	Qualification to Europa League league phase
3	Hajduk Split	36	17	12	7	49	34	+15	63	Qualification to Conference League second qualifying round
4	Varaždin	36	11	16	9	28	24	+4	49	Qualification to Conference League second qualifying round
5	Slaven Belupo	36	13	9	14	42	45	−3	48	
6	Istra 1961	36	11	15	10	39	42	−3	48	
7	Osijek	36	11	9	16	46	52	−6	42	
8	Lokomotiva	36	10	9	17	45	54	−9	39	
9	Gorica	36	9	10	17	29	51	−22	37	
10	Šibenik (R)	36	7	9	20	28	60	−32	30	Relegation to First Football League

Source: SuperSport HNL
Rules for classification: 1) Points; 2) Head-to-head points; 3) Head-to-head goal difference; 4) Head-to-head goals scored (at home if two teams tied); 5) Goal difference; 6) Goals scored; 7) Play-off
(Note: Criteria 2-4 and 7 is only used if deciding champion, teams to international competition or teams for relegation and in that case criteria 6 will not be used).
(C) Champions; (R) Relegated

== Results ==
Each team plays home-and-away against every other team in the league twice, for a total of 36 matches each played.

Home \ Away	RIJ	DIN	HAJ	VAR	IST	SLA	OSI	GOR	LOK	ŠIB	RIJ	DIN	HAJ	VAR	IST	SLA	OSI	GOR	LOK	ŠIB
Rijeka		1–1	0–0	1–1	4–0	2–0	1–1	1–0	4–0	3–0		4–0	3–0	1–0	0–1	2–0	0–2	2–1	4–1	1–1
Dinamo Zagreb	0–0		0–1	3–2	5–0	1–1	2–4	2–1	5–1	3–0	1–0		2–2	1–0	3–1	5–0	2–0	3–1	3–0	3–0
Hajduk Split	2–2	1–0		2–1	1–1	2–1	1–0	4–1	2–1	4–0	2–1	1–3		1–0	0–1	0–0	4–0	2–1	1–1	1–0
Varaždin	0–0	0–1	1–0		1–0	2–0	0–0	2–1	1–1	2–1	1–0	1–1	1–1		0–0	0–1	2–1	0–0	2–1	1–1
Istra 1961	0–1	2–2	1–1	0–0		2–3	2–1	2–1	0–2	3–3	2–0	3–0	1–1	0–0		1–1	2–1	0–0	3–2	3–0
Slaven Belupo	0–0	4–1	0–2	1–1	0–1		3–2	2–1	2–2	2–2	2–1	0–1	0–1	0–1	0–0		1–4	4–0	2–1	2–0
Osijek	0–2	1–2	2–2	2–1	2–2	1–0		2–0	3–0	1–2	0–2	2–1	2–0	0–0	1–1	1–2		0–1	1–1	2–2
Gorica	0–1	2–2	1–0	0–0	1–0	2–1	2–2		1–4	2–1	0–0	1–0	1–1	1–1	3–2	0–3	1–0		0–3	1–0
Lokomotiva	2–2	3–1	1–1	0–1	1–2	0–1	0–1	2–0		0–1	0–1	1–1	3–2	1–0	0–0	0–2	3–0	1–1		1–2
Šibenik	0–1	0–4	1–2	0–0	0–0	2–0	1–2	1–0	0–3		0–1	0–4	0–1	0–2	1–0	1–1	4–1	0–0	1–2	

Updated to match(es) played on 17 May 2025. Source: SuperSport HNL (in Croatian)
Legend: Blue = home team win; Yellow = draw; Red = away team win.

== Statistics ==
=== Top scorers ===
As of 25 May 2025

Rank	Player	Club	Goals
1	(Croatia) Marko Livaja	Hajduk Split	19
2	(Croatia) Sandro Kulenović	Dinamo Zagreb	15
3	(Croatia) Robert Mudražija	Lokomotiva	14
4	(Croatia) Toni Fruk	Rijeka	11
5	(Austria) Arnel Jakupović	Osijek	9
5	(Croatia) Duje Čop	Lokomotiva / Rijeka	9
7	(North Macedonia) Ilija Nestorovski	Slaven Belupo	8
7	(North Macedonia) Dimitar Mitrovski	Varaždin	8
7	(Croatia) Niko Janković	Rijeka	8

== Annual awards ==
=== Official awards ===
Given by HNS, SuperSport, HRNogomet, MAXSport and Sportnet.hr.

Award	Winner	Club
Player of the Season	(Croatia) Marko Livaja	Hajduk Split
Young Player of the Season	(Croatia) Toni Fruk	Rijeka
Top goalscorer	(Croatia) Marko Livaja (19 goals)	Hajduk Split
Manager of the Season	(Montenegro) Radomir Đalović	Rijeka
Goalkeeper of the Season	(Bosnia and Herzegovina) Martin Zlomislić	Rijeka
Goal of the Season	(Croatia) Marko Livaja vs Šibenik (Matchday 18)	Hajduk Split
Save of the Season	(Croatia) Marko Malenica vs Hajduk (Matchday 5)	Osijek

Team of the Year
Goalkeeper	(Croatia) Ivan Sušak (Slaven Belupo)			
Defence	(Croatia) Moris Valinčić (Istra)	(Bosnia and Herzegovina) Stjepan Radeljić (Rijeka)	(Croatia) Filip Uremović (Hajduk Split)	(Croatia) Roko Jurišić (Osijek)
Midfield	(Croatia) Alen Grgić (Slaven Belupo)	(Croatia) Toni Fruk (Rijeka)	(Croatia) Martin Baturina (Dinamo Zagreb)	(Croatia) Mateo Lisica (Istra)
Attack	(Croatia) Sandro Kulenović (Dinamo Zagreb)		(Croatia) Marko Livaja (Hajduk Split)	

=== Trophy Footballer ===
Given by Croatian Association Football Union.

Award	Winner	Club
Player of the Season	(Croatia) Marko Livaja	Hajduk Split
Manager of the Season	(Spain) Gonzalo García	Istra
Young Player of the Season	(Croatia) Adriano Jagušić	Slaven Belupo

Team of the Year
Goalkeeper	(Croatia) Marko Malenica (Osijek)			
Defence	(Austria) Dario Marešić (Istra)	(Croatia) Moris Valinčić (Istra)	(Bosnia and Herzegovina) Stjepan Radeljić (Rijeka)	(Croatia) Roko Jurišić (Osijek)
Midfield	(Croatia) Josip Mišić (Dinamo Zagreb)	(Croatia) Toni Fruk (Rijeka)		(Croatia) Martin Baturina (Dinamo Zagreb)
Attack	(North Macedonia) Dimitar Mitrovski (Varaždin)	(Croatia) Marko Livaja (Hajduk Split)		(Croatia) Marko Pjaca (Dinamo Zagreb)

Second best Team of the Year
Goalkeeper	(Bosnia and Herzegovina) Martin Zlomislić (Rijeka)			
Defence	(France) Ronaël Pierre-Gabriel (Dinamo Zagreb)	(Croatia) Ante Majstorović (Rijeka)	(Finland) Ville Koski (Istra)	(Croatia) Frane Maglica (Varaždin)
Midfield	(Croatia) Petar Sučić (Dinamo Zagreb)	(Croatia) Ivan Rakitić (Hajduk Split)		(Croatia) Robert Mudražija (Lokomotiva Zagreb)
Attack	(Croatia) Adriano Jagušić (Slaven Belupo)	(Croatia) Mateo Lisica (Istra)		(Croatia) Alen Grgić (Slaven Belupo)

== Attendances ==
No.	Club	Average attendance	Change	Highest
1	HNK Hajduk Split	22,028	16,7%	33,502
2	GNK Dinamo Zagreb	10,987	21,9%	23,756
3	NK Osijek	5,739	-22,6%	11,532
4	HNK Rijeka	5,375	-16,1%	8,187
5	NK 1961 Istra Pula	3,193	22,7%	7,443
6	NK Varaždin	3,082	3,8%	10,428
7	HNK Gorica	1,770	-3,3%	5,146
8	HNK Šibenik	1,559	74,5%	3,438
9	NK Slaven Koprivnica	1,529	19,5%	3,200
10	NK Lokomotiva Zagreb	1,518	-6,5%	8,981
