= 2026–27 NK Istra 1961 season =

NK Istra 1961
2026–27 season
- Owner: Baskonia - Alavés Group
- Manager: Krešimir Režić (until 29 May 2026); Javier Cabello (since 9 June 2026)
- Stadium: Stadion Aldo Drosina
- HNL: Pre-season
- Croatian Cup: Pre-season

The 2026–27 NK Istra 1961 season is the club's 66th season in existence and the 18th consecutive season in the top flight of Croatian football.

== First-team squad ==
As of 9 September 2026

Note: Flags indicate national team as defined under FIFA eligibility rules; some limited exceptions apply. Players may hold more than one non-FIFA nationality.

No.	Pos.	Nation	Player
1	GK	CRO	Franko Kolić (captain)
3	DF	TUN	Mohamed Nasraoui
4	DF	CRO	Raul Kumar
5	MF	SWE	Demirel Hodžić
7	FW	BIH	Vinko Rozić
8	MF	CRO	Antonio Maurić
9	FW	BRA	Isaac (on loan from Hellas Verona)
11	MF	CRO	Silvio Goričan
13	DF	CRO	Niko Šepić
16	DF	FIN	Samuli Miettinen

No.	Pos.	Nation	Player
20	MF	CRO	Dukan Ahmeti
22	MF	DEN	Emil Frederiksen
23	FW	NZL	Stipe Ukich
25	MF	ARG	Gustavo Albarracín (on loan from Deportivo Alavés)
30	MF	CRO	Nik Škafar Žužić
40	GK	CRO	Jan Paus-Kunšt
44	DF	SLO	Rene Hrvatin
88	MF	MLI	Daouda Doumbia
94	FW	BIH	Hamza Jaganjac
97	DF	BIH	Advan Kadušić

== Transfers ==
=== In ===
Pos	Player	Transferred from	Fee	Date	Source
MF	(Croatia) Ivan Šaranić	(Croatia) Sesvete	Free	12 June 2026	
DF	(Finland) Ville Koski	(Spain) Deportivo Alavés	Loan return	15 June 2026	
FW	(Netherlands) Saydou Bangura	(Bosnia and Herzegovina) Široki Brijeg	Loan return	30 June 2026	
FW	(Bosnia and Herzegovina) Hamza Jaganjac	(Bosnia and Herzegovina) Željezničar Sarajevo	Loan return	30 June 2026	
MF	(Mali) Daouda Doumbia	(Portugal) Feirense	Undisclosed	18 July 2026	
DF	(Canada) Jovan Ivanišević	(Bosnia and Herzegovina) Sarajevo	Early loan return	4 August 2026	
FW	(Brazil) Isaac	(Italy) Hellas Verona	Loan	20 August 2026	
MF	(Sweden) Demirel Hodžić	(Italy) Milan Futuro / AC Milan	Undisclosed	7 September 2026	

Source: Glasilo Hrvatskog nogometnog saveza

=== Out ===
Pos	Player	Transferred to	Fee	Date	Source
DF	(Finland) Ville Koski	(Spain) Deportivo Alavés	€3,000,000	15 June 2026	
DF	(Germany) Marcel Heister	(Croatia) Osijek	Free	24 June 2026	
MF	(Slovenia) Leo Štulac	(Slovenia) Koper	Free	24 June 2026	
FW	(Ecuador) Allen Obando	(Ecuador) Barcelona SC	End of loan	13 July 2026	
MF	(Bosnia and Herzegovina) Stjepan Lončar	(Indonesia) Persija Jakarta	€300,000	18 July 2026	
FW	(Bosnia and Herzegovina) Smail Prevljak	(Croatia) Dinamo Zagreb	€800,000	27 July 2026	
MF	(Nigeria) Israel Isaac Ayuma	(Portugal) Marítimo	Loan	2 August 2026	
FW	(Nigeria) Charles Agada	(Croatia) Orijent	Loan	3 August 2026	
DF	(Canada) Jovan Ivanišević	(Bosnia and Herzegovina) Sarajevo	€150,000	4 August 2026	
DF	(Nigeria) Mutari Momoh	(Croatia) Uljanik	Dual registration	13 August 2026	
MF	(Croatia) Dominik Celija	(Croatia) Uljanik	Dual registration	13 August 2026	
MF	(Croatia) Matija Kablar	(Croatia) Uljanik	Dual registration	13 August 2026	
FW	(The Gambia) Ebou Sama	(Croatia) Uljanik	Dual registration	13 August 2026	
FW	(Netherlands) Saydou Bangura	(Slovenia) Radomlje	Free	19 August 2026	
DF	(Bosnia and Herzegovina) Filip Taraba	(Croatia) Rudeš	€200,000	3 September 2026	
MF	(Croatia) Ivan Šaranić	(Turkey) Bursaspor	€650,000	4 September 2026	

Source: Glasilo Hrvatskog nogometnog saveza

Total spending: ▼€0

Total income: ▲€5,100,000

Total expenditure: ▲€5,100,000

== Competitions ==
=== Overview ===
Competition	First match	Last match	Starting round	Record							
Competition	First match	Last match	Starting round	Pld	W	D	L	GF	GA	GD	Win %
SuperSport HNL	1 August 2026	May 2027	Matchday 1	14	5	4	5	26	22	+4	35.71
Croatian Cup	8 September 2026		First round	2	2	0	0	8	0	+8	100.00
Total				16	7	4	5	34	22	+12	43.75

Last updated: 22 November 2026
Source: Soccerway

=== Croatian Football League ===
==== League table ====
Pos	Team	Pld	W	D	L	GF	GA	GD	Pts	Qualification or relegation (Note: The 2026–27 Croatian Football Cup winners qualify for the Europa League first qualifying round (or the second-placed team if the Croatian Cup winners finish first). If the Croatian Cup winners finish in the top three, the second Conference League second qualifying round spot will be passed to the fourth-placed team.)
4	Rijeka	13	6	3	4	21	18	+3	21	
5	Osijek	13	6	2	5	22	18	+4	20	
6	Istra 1961	14	5	4	5	26	22	+4	19	
7	Slaven Belupo	13	5	1	7	19	28	−9	16	
8	Rudeš	14	5	1	8	16	29	−13	16	

Updated to match(es) played on 22 November 2026. Source: SuperSport HNL
Rules for classification: 1) Points; 2) Head-to-head points; 3) Head-to-head goal difference; 4) Head-to-head goals scored (at home if two teams tied); 5) Goal difference; 6) Goals scored; 7) Play-off
(Note: Criteria 2-4 and 7 is only used if deciding champion, teams to international competition or teams for relegation and in that case criteria 6 will not be used).

==== Results summary ====
Overall								Home						Away					
Pld	W	D	L	GF	GA	GD	Pts	W	D	L	GF	GA	GD	W	D	L	GF	GA	GD
14	5	4	5	26	22	+4	19	3	2	2	15	11	+4	2	2	3	11	11	0

Last updated: 22 November 2026.
Source: SuperSport HNL

==== Results by round ====
Round	1	2	3	4	5	6	7	8	9	10	11	12	13	14	15
Ground	H	A	H	A	H	A	H	H	A	A	H	A	H	A	
Result	L	D	W	L	D	D	W	L	W	L	D	W	W	L	
Position	6	6		7		6	6		6	6	6	6			

Updated to match(es) played on 22 November 2026. Source: SuperSport HNL
A = Away; H = Home; W = Win; D = Draw; L = Loss

==== Matches ====
1 August 2026 1	Istra 1961	2–3	Lokomotiva	Pula
18:30 CEST (UTC+02:00)	Frederiksen 30', 58'	Report	Triantafyllou 26'; Vuković 43'; Pajač (yellow card) 49'; Godec (yellow card) 78'; Antunović (yellow card) 89'; Katić 89' (yellow card) 89'	Stadium: Stadion Aldo Drosina; Attendance: 2,015; Referee: Patrik Pavlešić

9 August 2026 2	Hajduk Split	2–2	Istra 1961	Split
21:00 CEST (UTC+02:00)	Pukštas 16'; Šotiček (yellow card) 60'; Livaja 84'; Šutalo (yellow card) 90+7'	Report	Frederiksen 42'; Doumbia (yellow card) 48'; Miettinen (yellow card) 64'; Ahmeti 90+5'	Stadium: Stadion Poljud; Attendance: 20,506; Referee: Mateo Erceg

15 August 2026 3	Istra 1961	3–0	Slaven Belupo	Pula
18:30 CEST (UTC+02:00)	Maurić (yellow card) 12'; Škafar Žužić 16'; Jaganjac 35', 56'; Ukich (yellow card) 90+2'	Report	Kutleša (red card) 3'; Adeshina (yellow card) 78'; Dabro (yellow card) 87'	Stadium: Stadion Aldo Drosina; Attendance: 2,494; Referee: Patrik Kolarić

23 August 2026 4	Rijeka	3–2	Istra 1961	Rijeka
18:30 CEST (UTC+02:00)	Nasraoui 18' (o.g.); Puljić (penalty missed) 43' 43'; Fruk 53'	Report	Jaganjac (yellow card) 62' (goal) 72'; Frederiksen 90+3'	Stadium: Stadion Rujevica; Attendance: 5,371; Referee: Igor Pajač

29 August 2026 5	Istra 1961	2–2	Dinamo Zagreb	Pula
18:30 CEST (UTC+02:00)	Jaganjac 14' (yellow card) 62'; Ahmeti 29'	Report	Stojković (yellow card) 13'; Beljo 24'; Kačavenda (yellow card) 67'; Prevljak 84'; McKenna (yellow card) 90+3'	Stadium: Stadion Aldo Drosina; Attendance: 5,021; Referee: Patrik Pavlešić

4 September 2026 6	Varaždin	0–0	Istra 1961	Varaždin
20:00 CEST (UTC+02:00)	Jurić (yellow card) 76'; Sikošek (yellow card) 80'; Maglica (yellow card) 80'	Report	Ahmeti (yellow card) 24'; Hrvatin (yellow card) 76'; Jaganjac (yellow card) 90+2'	Stadium: Stadion Varteks; Attendance: 1,801; Referee: Duje Strukan

13 September 2026 7	Istra 1961	3–2	Rudeš	Pula
17:00 CEST (UTC+02:00)	Frederiksen 11' (pen.), 28', 58'; Jaganjac (yellow card) 58'	Report	Stolnik (yellow card) 35'; Rogić (yellow card) 70'; Saho 85'; Ilečić 89'	Stadium: Stadion Aldo Drosina; Attendance: 1,824; Referee: Antonio Melnjak

19 September 2026 8	Istra 1961	0–1	Gorica	Pula
20:00 CEST (UTC+02:00)	Doumbia (yellow card) 45+1'; Ukich (yellow card) 67'; Isaac (yellow card) 90'	Report	Pranjić 84'; Cvijanović (yellow card) 89'; Vrzić (yellow card) 90'	Stadium: Stadion Aldo Drosina; Attendance: 2,688; Referee: Dario Bel

10 October 2026 9	Osijek	1–3	Istra 1961	Osijek
18:00 CEST (UTC+02:00)	Mikolčić 2' (yellow card) 69'; León (yellow card) 77'	Report	Maurić 34'; Škafar Žužić 50'; Hodžić (yellow card) 67'; Albarracín (yellow card) 71'; Ahmeti 90+3' (yellow card) 90+6'	Stadium: Opus Arena; Attendance: 6,012; Referee: Ivan Vukančić

17 October 2026 10	Lokomotiva	2–0	Istra 1961	Zagreb
15:00 CEST (UTC+02:00)	Karačić 11'; Kulušić 46'	Report	Šepić (yellow card) 52'	Stadium: Stadion Maksimir; Attendance: 405; Referee: Antonio Melnjak

26 October 2026 11	Istra 1961	2–2	Hajduk Split	Pula
18:00 CET (UTC+01:00)	Hodžić (yellow card) 30'; Jaganjac (yellow card) 39' (goal) 66'; Albarracín (yellow card) 52'; Kablar (yellow card) 70'; Frederiksen 80' (pen.)	Report	Fayad 8'; Hadžikadunić (yellow card) 13'; Šego (yellow card) 39' (goal) 54'	Stadium: Stadion Aldo Drosina; Attendance: 6,614; Referee: Patrik Kolarić

30 October 2026 12	Slaven Belupo	0–2	Istra 1961	Koprivnica
18:00 CET (UTC+01:00)	Adeshina (yellow card) 24'; Ratshukudu (yellow card) 75'	Report	Hrvatin (yellow card) 67'; Nasraoui 71'; Momoh (yellow card) 90+1'; Isaac 90+2' (yellow card) 90+2'	Stadium: Gradski stadion Attendance: 702; Referee: Igor Pajač

7 November 2026 13	Istra 1961	3–1	Rijeka	Pula
18:00 CET (UTC+01:00)	Frederiksen 30', 45+1', 88'; Kumar (yellow card) 69'; Rozić (yellow card) 80'; Hodžić (yellow card) 90'	Report	Puljić (red card) 27'; Husić (yellow card) 29'; Fruk 39'; Lasickas (yellow card) 61'; Majstorović (red card) 83'	Stadium: Stadion Aldo Drosina; Attendance: 3,040; Referee: Ivan Vukančić

22 November 2026 14	Dinamo Zagreb	3–2	Istra 1961	Zagreb
15:00 CET (UTC+01:00)	Stojković 11'; Topić 32'; Kačavenda (yellow card) 39'; Rodríguez 65'	Report	Jaganjac (yellow card) 35'; Albarracín (yellow card) 37'; Škafar Žužić 57'; Kumar 90+2'	Stadium: Stadion Maksimir; Attendance: 4,377; Referee: Igor Pajač

=== Croatian Football Cup ===
8 September 2026 R1	Zagorec Krapina	0–5	Istra 1961	Krapina
17:30 CEST (UTC+02:00)	Jazbec (yellow card) 29'	Report	Isaac 33', 38', 87'; Ukich 61'; Jaganjac 85'	Stadium: ŠRC Podgora; Attendance: 756; Referee: Domagoj Kurtović

3 November 2026 R2	Istra 1961	3–0	Neretva	Pula
17:00 CET (UTC+01:00)	Isaac 20', 35' (yellow card) 45'; Ahmeti (yellow card) 45+1'; Ukich (yellow card) 50'; Rozić 77'; Momoh (yellow card) 82'	Report	Brekalo (yellow card) 12'; Milićević (yellow card) 45'; Dodig (yellow card) 45'	Stadium: Stadion Aldo Drosina; Attendance: 562; Referee: Ivana Martinčić

== Player seasonal records ==
Updated 4 November 2026

=== Goals ===
Rank	Name	League	Cup	Total
1	(Brazil) Isaac	–	5	5
2	(Bosnia and Herzegovina) Hamza Jaganjac	–	1	1
2	(Bosnia and Herzegovina) Vinko Rozić	–	1	1
2	(New Zealand) Stipe Ukich	–	1	1
TOTALS		0	8	8

Source: Competitive matches

=== Clean sheets ===
Rank	Name	League	Cup	Total
1	(Croatia) Franko Kolić	2	–	2
2	(Croatia) Jan Paus-Kunšt	–	2	2
TOTALS		2	2	4

Source: Competitive matches

=== Disciplinary record ===
Number	Position	Player	HNL			Croatian Cup			Total		
Number	Position	Player	Yellow card	(yellow card) (yellow-red card)	Red card	Yellow card	(yellow card) (yellow-red card)	Red card	Yellow card	(yellow card) (yellow-red card)	Red card
4	DF	(Croatia) Raul Kumar	0	0	0	0	0	0	0	0	0
5	MF	(Sweden) Demirel Hodžić	0	0	0	0	0	0	0	0	0
7	FW	(Bosnia and Herzegovina) Vinko Rozić	0	0	0	0	0	0	0	0	0
8	MF	(Croatia) Antonio Maurić	0	0	0	0	0	0	0	0	0
9	FW	(Brazil) Isaac	0	0	0	1	0	0	1	0	0
13	DF	(Croatia) Niko Šepić	0	0	0	0	0	0	0	0	0
16	DF	(Finland) Samuli Miettinen	0	0	0	0	0	0	0	0	0
20	MF	(Croatia) Dukan Ahmeti	0	0	0	1	0	0	1	0	0
23	FW	(New Zealand) Stipe Ukich	0	0	0	1	0	0	1	0	0
25	MF	(Argentina) Gustavo Albarracín	0	0	0	0	0	0	0	0	0
34	MF	(Croatia) Matija Kablar	0	0	0	0	0	0	0	0	0
44	DF	(Slovenia) Rene Hrvatin	0	0	0	0	0	0	0	0	0
66	DF	(Nigeria) Mutari Momoh	0	0	0	1	0	0	1	0	0
88	MF	(Mali) Daouda Doumbia	0	0	0	0	0	0	0	0	0
94	FW	(Bosnia and Herzegovina) Hamza Jaganjac	0	0	0	0	0	0	0	0	0
TOTALS			0	0	0	4	0	0	4	0	0

=== Appearances and goals ===
Number	Position	Player	Apps	Goals	Apps	Goals	Apps	Goals
Number	Position	Player	Total		HNL (Note: First number represents appearances in starting eleven, while the second number indicates a substitute appearance.)		Croatian Cup	
1	GK	(Croatia) Franko Kolić	0	0	0+0	0	0+0	0
3	DF	(Tunisia) Mohamed Nasraoui	1	0	0+0	0	1+0	0
4	DF	(Croatia) Raul Kumar	1	0	0+0	0	1+0	0
5	MF	(Sweden) Demirel Hodžić	1	0	0+0	0	0+1	0
7	FW	(Bosnia and Herzegovina) Vinko Rozić	2	1	0+0	0	0+2	1
8	MF	(Croatia) Antonio Maurić	1	0	0+0	0	1+0	0
9	FW	(Brazil) Isaac	2	5	0+0	0	2+0	5
11	MF	(Croatia) Silvio Goričan	2	0	0+0	0	1+1	0
13	DF	(Croatia) Niko Šepić	1	0	0+0	0	0+1	0
16	DF	(Finland) Samuli Miettinen	1	0	0+0	0	0+1	0
20	MF	(Croatia) Dukan Ahmeti	2	0	0+0	0	2+0	0
22	MF	(Denmark) Emil Frederiksen	0	0	0+0	0	0+0	0
23	FW	(New Zealand) Stipe Ukich	2	1	0+0	0	2+0	1
24	DF	(Bosnia and Herzegovina) Filip Taraba	1	0	0+1	0	0+0	0
25	MF	(Argentina) Gustavo Albarracín	1	0	0+0	0	1+0	0
27	MF	(Croatia) Dominik Celija	2	0	0+0	0	2+0	0
30	MF	(Croatia) Nik Škafar Žužić	1	0	0+0	0	1+0	0
34	MF	(Croatia) Matija Kablar	2	0	0+0	0	2+0	0
39	FW	(Croatia) Toni Brajković	1	0	0+0	0	0+1	0
40	GK	(Croatia) Jan Paus-Kunšt	2	0	0+0	0	2+0	0
44	DF	(Slovenia) Rene Hrvatin	0	0	0+0	0	0+0	0
66	DF	(Nigeria) Mutari Momoh	2	0	0+0	0	2+0	0
80	MF	(Croatia) Ivan Šaranić	5	0	4+1	0	0+0	0
88	MF	(Mali) Daouda Doumbia	1	0	0+0	0	0+1	0
94	FW	(Bosnia and Herzegovina) Hamza Jaganjac	2	1	0+0	0	0+2	1
97	DF	(Bosnia and Herzegovina) Advan Kadušić	2	0	0+0	0	2+0	0
