= 2025–26 NK Istra 1961 season =

NK Istra 1961
2025–26 season
- Owner: Baskonia - Alavés Group
- Manager: Gonzalo García (until 13 June 2025); Goran Tomić (13 June 2025 - 13 September 2025); Oriol Riera (17 September 2025 - 19 April 2026); Krešimir Režić (since 20 April 2026)
- Stadium: Stadion Aldo Drosina
- HNL: 6th
- Croatian Cup: Second Round
- Top goalscorer: League: Smail Prevljak (14); All: Smail Prevljak (15)
- Highest home attendance: 8,124 v Hajduk Split (19 October 2025)
- Lowest home attendance: 1,063 v Slaven Belupo (4 May 2026)
- Average home league attendance: 2,912

The 2025–26 NK Istra 1961 season was the club's 65th season in existence and the 17th consecutive season in the top flight of Croatian football.

== First-team squad ==
As of 14 March 2026

Note: Flags indicate national team as defined under FIFA eligibility rules; some limited exceptions apply. Players may hold more than one non-FIFA nationality.

No.	Pos.	Nation	Player
1	GK	CRO	Franko Kolić
3	DF	TUN	Mohamed Nasraoui
5	MF	CRO	Josip Radošević (captain)
7	FW	BIH	Vinko Rozić
8	MF	CRO	Antonio Maurić
9	FW	BIH	Smail Prevljak
10	MF	BIH	Stjepan Lončar
11	MF	CRO	Silvio Goričan
13	DF	CRO	Niko Šepić
15	FW	GAM	Ebou Sama
16	DF	FIN	Samuli Miettinen
17	MF	DEN	Emil Frederiksen

No.	Pos.	Nation	Player
18	MF	NGR	Israel Isaac Ayuma
20	MF	CRO	Dukan Ahmeti
23	MF	SLO	Leo Štulac
24	DF	BIH	Filip Taraba
25	MF	ARG	Gustavo Albarracín (on loan from Deportivo Alavés)
26	DF	GER	Marcel Heister
29	FW	ECU	Allen Obando (on loan from Barcelona S.C.)
38	DF	CRO	Raul Kumar
40	GK	CRO	Jan Paus-Kunšt
44	DF	SLO	Rene Hrvatin
97	DF	BIH	Advan Kadušić

== Transfers ==
=== In ===
Pos	Player	Transferred from	Fee	Date	Source
DF	(Moldova) Iurie Iovu	(Spain) Deportivo Alavés B	Back from loan	10 June 2025	
DF	(Bosnia and Herzegovina) Filip Taraba	(Bosnia and Herzegovina) Široki Brijeg	€200,000	13 June 2025	
GK	(Croatia) Carlo Jurak	(Croatia) Uljanik	Back from loan	29 June 2025	
DF	(Canada) Jovan Ivanišević	(Italy) Bologna	Back from loan	30 June 2025	
DF	(Tunisia) Mohamed Nasraoui	(Tunisia) CS Sfaxien	€340,000	30 June 2025	
FW	(Netherlands) Saydou Bangura	(Netherlands) Roda JC Kerkrade	Undisclosed	3 July 2025	
MF	(Denmark) Emil Frederiksen	(Norway) Rosenborg	€300,000	9 July 2025	
DF	(Spain) Alejandro Jay	(Spain) Deportivo Alavés B	Loan	11 July 2025	
FW	(Bosnia and Herzegovina) Smail Prevljak	(Germany) Hertha BSC	Free	11 July 2025	
DF	(Slovenia) Rene Hrvatin	(Slovenia) Domžale	Free	4 January 2026	
DF	(Nigeria) Mutari Momoh	(Nigeria) Mavlon	Undisclosed	16 January 2026	
DF	(Croatia) Niko Šepić	(Croatia) Dinamo Zagreb	Undisclosed	16 January 2026	
DF	(Finland) Samuli Miettinen	(Finland) KuPS	Free	29 January 2026	
MF	(Croatia) Silvio Goričan	(Croatia) Lokomotiva Zagreb	€150,000	29 January 2026	
MF	(Argentina) Gustavo Albarracín	(Spain) Deportivo Alavés	Loan	4 February 2026	
MF	(Slovenia) Leo Štulac	(Italy) Reggiana	Free	16 February 2026	
FW	(Ecuador) Allen Obando	(Ecuador) Barcelona	Loan	12 March 2026	
FW	(Iceland) Danijel Djuric	(Serbia) Železničar Pančevo	Recalled from loan	13 March 2026	
FW	(The Gambia) Ebou Sama	(The Gambia) Steve Biko	Undisclosed	14 March 2026	

Source: Glasilo Hrvatskog nogometnog saveza

=== Out ===
Pos	Player	Transferred to	Fee	Date	Source
DF	(Moldova) Iurie Iovu	(Scotland) Dundee United	€200,000	10 June 2025	
DF	(Cameroon) Stephane Keller	(Spain) Deportivo Alavés	Back from loan	11 June 2025	
DF	(Croatia) Luka Bogdan	(Cyprus) AEL Limassol	Free	11 June 2025	
FW	(Bosnia and Herzegovina) Hamza Jaganjac	(Bosnia and Herzegovina) Željezničar Sarajevo	Loan	11 June 2025	
FW	(Croatia) Mateo Lisica	(Croatia) Dinamo Zagreb	€1,300,000	11 June 2025	
DF	(Croatia) Moris Valinčić	(Croatia) Dinamo Zagreb	€1,350,000	24 June 2025	
GK	(Croatia) Carlo Jurak	(Austria) FC Juniors OÖ	Undisclosed	26 June 2025	
MF	(Croatia) Slavko Blagojević	No team	Retired	28 June 2025	
GK	(Croatia) Lovro Majkić	(Greece) Aris Thessaloniki	€200,000	1 July 2025	
GK	(Croatia) Marko Juršić	(Croatia) Banjole	Free	18 July 2025	
MF	(Croatia) Ivan Ćalušić	(Slovenia) Radomlje	Free	22 July 2025	
FW	(Croatia) Lorenzo Travaglia	(Croatia) Mladost Ždralovi	Free	22 July 2025	
FW	(Georgia (country)) Giorgi Gagua	(Slovakia) DAC Dunajská Streda	€200,000	24 July 2025	
DF	(Croatia) Raul Kumar	(Croatia) Uljanik	Dual registration	19 August 2025	
MF	(Croatia) Dukan Ahmeti	(Croatia) Uljanik	Dual registration	19 August 2025	
MF	(Croatia) Dominik Celija	(Croatia) Uljanik	Dual registration	19 August 2025	
FW	(Nigeria) Charles Agada	(Croatia) Uljanik	Dual registration	19 August 2025	
FW	(New Zealand) Stipe Ukich	(Croatia) Uljanik	Dual registration	19 August 2025	
MF	(Bosnia and Herzegovina) Irfan Ramić	(Bosnia and Herzegovina) Stupčanica Olovo	Free	1 September 2025	
FW	(Croatia) Kristian Fućak	No team	Free	3 September 2025	
FW	(Nigeria) Salim Fago Lawal	(Czech Republic) Viktoria Plzeň	€2,400,000	27 January 2026	
DF	(Finland) Ville Koski	(Spain) Deportivo Alavés	Loan	31 January 2026	
FW	(Netherlands) Saydou Bangura	(Bosnia and Herzegovina) Široki Brijeg	Loan	31 January 2026	
DF	(Spain) Alejandro Jay	(Spain) Deportivo Alavés B	Recalled from loan	2 February 2026	
DF	(Canada) Jovan Ivanišević	(Bosnia and Herzegovina) Sarajevo	Loan	5 February 2026	
MF	(Croatia) Marin Žgomba	(Belarus) Vitebsk	Free	7 February 2026	
DF	(Nigeria) Mutari Momoh	(Croatia) Uljanik	Dual registration	16 February 2026	
FW	(Iceland) Danijel Djuric	(Serbia) Železničar Pančevo	Loan	16 February 2026	
DF	(Austria) Dario Marešić	(Croatia) Hajduk Split	€175,000	17 February 2026	
MF	(Iceland) Logi Hrafn Róbertsson	(Sweden) IFK Värnamo	€200,000	17 February 2026	
FW	(Iceland) Danijel Djuric	(Iceland) KA	€125,000	13 March 2026	

Source: Glasilo Hrvatskog nogometnog saveza

Total spending: ▼€990,000

Total income: ▲€6,150,000

Total expenditure: ▲€5,160,000

== Competitions ==
=== Overview ===
Competition	First match	Last match	Starting round	Final position	Record							
Competition	First match	Last match	Starting round	Final position	Pld	W	D	L	GF	GA	GD	Win %
SuperSport HNL	3 August 2025	23 May 2026	Matchday 1	6th	36	12	7	17	39	50	−11	33.33
Croatian Cup	16 September 2025	5 November 2025	First round	Second round	2	1	0	1	3	3	+0	50.00
Total					38	13	7	18	42	53	−11	34.21

Last updated: 24 May 2026
Source: Soccerway

=== Croatian Football League ===
==== League table ====
Pos	Team	Pld	W	D	L	GF	GA	GD	Pts	Qualification or relegation
4	Rijeka	36	14	11	11	49	36	+13	53	Qualification to Conference League second qualifying round (Note: The 2025–26 Croatian Football Cup winners qualified for the Europa League first qualifying round. Since the cup winners (Dinamo Zagreb) qualified based on league position, the Europa League spot was passed to the second-placed team, and the second Conference League spot passed to the fourth-placed team.)
5	Lokomotiva	36	10	14	12	40	52	−12	44	
6	Istra 1961	36	12	7	17	39	50	−11	43	
7	Gorica	36	11	8	17	40	48	−8	41	
8	Slaven Belupo	36	10	11	15	46	61	−15	41	

Source: SuperSport HNL
Rules for classification: 1) Points; 2) Head-to-head points; 3) Head-to-head goal difference; 4) Head-to-head goals scored (at home if two teams tied); 5) Goal difference; 6) Goals scored; 7) Play-off
(Note: Criteria 2-4 and 7 is only used if deciding champion, teams to international competition or teams for relegation and in that case criteria 6 will not be used).

==== Results summary ====
Overall								Home						Away					
Pld	W	D	L	GF	GA	GD	Pts	W	D	L	GF	GA	GD	W	D	L	GF	GA	GD
36	12	7	17	39	50	−11	43	6	5	7	19	24	−5	6	2	10	20	26	−6

Last updated: 24 May 2026.
Source: SuperSport HNL

==== Results by round ====
Round	1	2	3	4	5	6	7	8	9	10	11	12	13	14	15	16	17	18	19	20	21	22	23	24	25	26	27	28	29	30	31	32	33	34	35	36
Ground	A	H	A	A	H	A	H	A	H	H	A	H	H	A	H	A	H	A	A	H	A	A	H	A	H	A	H	H	A	H	H	A	H	A	H	A
Result	L	D	D	L	W	L	W	D	W	L	W	D	W	L	D	W	L	W	W	D	L	L	L	L	L	W	W	L	L	L	L	L	W	W	D	L
Position	7	6	7	8	8	9	7	7	5	6	6	6	4	5	5	5	5	4	3	3	4	5	6	6	6	6	5	5	6	7	7	8	6	6	6	6

Updated to match(es) played on 24 May 2026. Source: SuperSport HNL
A = Away; H = Home; W = Win; D = Draw; L = Loss

==== Matches ====
3 August 2025 1	Hajduk Split	2–1	Istra 1961	Split
21:00 CEST (UTC+02:00)	Benrahou 45+1' (pen.); Kalik (yellow card) 53'; Karačić 86'	Report	Maurić (yellow card) 42'; Prevljak 48'	Stadium: Stadion Poljud; Attendance: 25,501; Referee: Patrik Kolarić

9 August 2025 2	Istra 1961	2–2	Lokomotiva	Pula
18:15 CEST (UTC+02:00)	Lawal 50'; Lončar (yellow card) 72'; Bangura 77'	Report	Vuković 8'; Pajač (yellow card) 42'; Diop (yellow card) 80'; Kolinger (red card) 88'; Sušak 90+4'	Stadium: Stadion Aldo Drosina; Attendance: 3,483; Referee: Zdenko Lovrić

15 August 2025 3	Vukovar 1991	1–1	Istra 1961	Vinkovci
18:45 CEST (UTC+02:00)	Banovec 41'; Mejía (yellow card) 76'	Report	Heister (yellow card) 5'; Lončar 39'	Stadium: Stadion HNK Cibalia; Attendance: 1,235; Referee: Ivan Vukančić

23 August 2025 4	Dinamo Zagreb	3–0	Istra 1961	Zagreb
21:00 CEST (UTC+02:00)	Beljo 5'; Stojković (yellow card) 64'; Villar 81'; Kulenović 90' (yellow card)	Report	Radošević (yellow card) 64'; Rozić (yellow card) 73'; Lončar (yellow card)	Stadium: Stadion Maksimir; Attendance: 11,461; Referee: Duje Strukan

29 August 2025 5	Istra 1961	1–0	Gorica	Pula
20:00 CEST (UTC+02:00)	Kadušić (yellow card) 21'; Heister (yellow card) 31'; Lončar 46'; Marešić (yellow card) 90+4'	Report	Pavičić (yellow card) 15'; Filipović (yellow card) 35'	Stadium: Stadion Aldo Drosina; Attendance: 2,437; Referee: Ante Čulina

12 September 2025 6	Slaven Belupo	2–1	Istra 1961	Koprivnica
20:00 CEST (UTC+02:00)	Mitrović 33'; Nestorovski (yellow card) 71' (goal) 77'	Report	Kadušić 21'; Marešić (yellow card) 69'	Stadium: Gradski stadion Attendance: 1,513; Referee: Zdenko Lovrić

21 September 2025 7	Istra 1961	2–1	Osijek	Pula
19:15 CEST (UTC+02:00)	Maurić 65'; Bangura 81'	Report	Omerović 39'	Stadium: Stadion Aldo Drosina; Attendance: 2,519; Referee: Patrik Kolarić

27 September 2025 8	Rijeka	0–0	Istra 1961	Rijeka
16:00 CEST (UTC+02:00)	Čop (yellow card) 28'; Devetak (yellow card) 36'; Husić (yellow card) 81'	Report		Stadium: Stadion Rujevica; Attendance: 5,369; Referee: Ante Čulina

3 October 2025 9	Istra 1961	1–0	Varaždin	Pula
18:00 CEST (UTC+02:00)	Marešić (yellow card) 54'; Lončar 64'; Koski (yellow card) 90+2'; Prevljak (yellow card) 90+5'	Report	Duvnjak (yellow card) 30'; Ba (yellow card) 63'; Vuk (yellow card) 90+1'; Mamut (yellow card) 90+4'; Zelenika (yellow card) 90+5'	Stadium: Stadion Aldo Drosina; Attendance: 1,959; Referee: Patrik Pavlešić

19 October 2025 10	Istra 1961	0–3	Hajduk Split	Pula
16:00 CEST (UTC+02:00)	Lončar (yellow card) 42'	Report	Almena 22'; Rebić (yellow card) 39'; Šego 42', 77'; Pajaziti (yellow card) 47'	Stadium: Stadion Aldo Drosina; Attendance: 8,124; Referee: Patrik Kolarić

25 October 2025 11	Lokomotiva	1–2	Istra 1961	Zagreb
15:45 CEST (UTC+02:00)	Stojaković 15' (yellow card) 67'; Diop (yellow card) 83'; Pajač (yellow card) 90+4'	Report	Maurić (yellow card) 28' (goal) 45+1'; Heister (yellow card) 58'; Ayuma 83'	Stadium: Stadion Maksimir; Attendance: 305; Referee: Ivan Vukančić

1 November 2025 12	Istra 1961	1–1	Vukovar 1991	Pula
18:45 CET (UTC+01:00)	Frederiksen 10'	Report	González 14'; Puljić (yellow card) 89'	Stadium: Stadion Aldo Drosina; Attendance: 2,209; Referee: Zdenko Lovrić

9 November 2025 13	Istra 1961	2–1	Dinamo Zagreb	Pula
16:00 CET (UTC+01:00)	Lawal 10', 32'; Kadušić (yellow card) 27'; Jay (yellow card) 54'; Maurić (yellow card) 63'; Kolić (yellow card) 84'; Lončar (yellow card) 90+4'; Heister (yellow card) 90+7'	Report	McKenna (yellow card) 55'; Zajc (yellow card) 66'; Bakrar 81'; Ljubičić (yellow card) 90+6'	Stadium: Stadion Aldo Drosina; Attendance: 5,241; Referee: Duje Strukan

23 November 2025 14	Gorica	1–0	Istra 1961	Velika Gorica
18:15 CET (UTC+01:00)	Pršir 36' (yellow card) 72'; Trontelj (yellow card) 40'; Pozo (yellow card) 90+1'	Report	Koski (yellow card) 10'; Marešić (yellow card) 45+1'	Stadium: Stadion Radnik; Attendance: 463; Referee: Ante Čulina

29 November 2025 15	Istra 1961	1–1	Slaven Belupo	Pula
18:15 CET (UTC+01:00)	Maurić (yellow card) 49'; Prevljak 90+3'; Koski (yellow card) 90+5'	Report	Caimacov (yellow card) 26'; Nestorovski 45' (pen.); Zuta (yellow card) 82'	Stadium: Stadion Aldo Drosina; Attendance: 1,574; Referee: Patrik Kolarić

7 December 2025 16	Osijek	1–5	Istra 1961	Osijek
17:30 CET (UTC+01:00)	Guedes (yellow card) 29'; Babec 59'; Mersinaj (yellow card) 77'	Report	Heister (yellow card) 10'; Prevljak 17', 27', 44'; Frederiksen 49'; Lawal 73'; Djuric (yellow card) 84'	Stadium: Opus Arena; Attendance: 2,734; Referee: Igor Pajač

19 December 2025 18	Varaždin	1–3	Istra 1961	Varaždin
16:00 CET (UTC+01:00)	Mamut 26' (yellow card) 82'; Punčec (yellow card) 44'; Ba (yellow card) 63'	Report	Heister (yellow card) 20'; Prevljak 25', 68'; Rozić 46' (yellow card) 67'; Nasraoui (yellow card) 57'	Stadium: Stadion Varteks; Attendance: 956; Referee: Igor Pajač

20 January 2026 (Note: The match originally started on 14 December 2025 and was abandoned at 15th minute due to dense fog. The match resumed on 20 January 2026, 16:00, from the point of abandonment.) 17	Istra 1961	1–2	Rijeka	Pula
16:00 CET (UTC+01:00)	Lawal 5'; Marešić (yellow card) 76'	Report	Menalo 9'; Dantas 76' (pen.); Vignato (yellow card) 81'; Radeljić (yellow card) 85'	Stadium: Stadion Aldo Drosina; Attendance: 3,386; Referee: Ante Čulina

25 January 2026 19	Hajduk Split	1–2	Istra 1961	Split
15:00 CET (UTC+01:00)	Mlačić (yellow card) 29'; Sanyang (yellow card) 62'; Róbertsson 83' (o.g.); Šarlija (yellow card) 87'; Skelin (yellow card) 90+6'	Report	Prevljak 10'; Frederiksen 22'; Rozić (yellow card) 26'; Nasraoui (yellow card) 51'	Stadium: Stadion Poljud; Attendance: 11,925; Referee: Mateo Erceg

30 January 2026 20	Istra 1961	1–1	Lokomotiva	Pula
18:00 CET (UTC+01:00)	Prevljak 13'	Report	Bošković (yellow card) 25'; Vuković (yellow card) 32' (goal) 35'	Stadium: Stadion Aldo Drosina; Attendance: 1,757; Referee: Ivan Vukančić

7 February 2026 21	Vukovar 1991	3–2	Istra 1961	Osijek
15:00 CET (UTC+01:00)	Puljić 15'; Tadić 47'; Banovec 88' (yellow card) 90+5'; Tičinović (yellow card) 90+4'	Report	Rozić (yellow card) 10'; Kolić (yellow card) 15'; Marešić 56' (pen.) (yellow card) 90+5'; Kumar (yellow card) 64'; Prevljak 85'	Stadium: Gradski Vrt Stadium; Attendance: 556; Referee: Ante Terzić

14 February 2026 22	Dinamo Zagreb	4–0	Istra 1961	Zagreb
15:00 CET (UTC+01:00)	McKenna 24'; Domínguez (yellow card) 35'; Beljo 60'; Zajc 73'; Vidović 87'	Report	Miettinen (yellow card) 38'; Prevljak (yellow card) 47'; Frederiksen (yellow card) 72'; Lončar (yellow card) 90+2'	Stadium: Stadion Maksimir; Attendance: 5,600; Referee: Mateo Erceg

21 February 2026 23	Istra 1961	0–2	Gorica	Pula
15:00 CET (UTC+01:00)	Lončar (yellow card) 59'; Ayuma (yellow card) 61'	Report	Pavičić 41'; Perić (yellow card) 71'; Pršir 76'	Stadium: Stadion Aldo Drosina; Attendance: 1,673; Referee: Ivan Vukančić

27 February 2026 24	Slaven Belupo	1–0	Istra 1961	Koprivnica
18:00 CET (UTC+01:00)	Krušelj (yellow card) 46'; Nestorovski 64'; Međimorec (yellow card) 68'; Hadžikić (yellow card) 90+1'	Report	Nasraoui (yellow card) 10'; Šepić (yellow card) 53'; Radošević (yellow card) 66'	Stadium: Gradski stadion Attendance: 923; Referee: Ante Terzić

6 March 2026 25	Istra 1961	0–1	Osijek	Pula
18:00 CET (UTC+01:00)	Rozić (yellow card) 72'; Kadušić (yellow card) 79'	Report	Bubanja (yellow card) 32'; Mikolčić (yellow card) 43'; Kolarik (yellow card) 54'; Omerović 61'; Mejía (yellow card) 77'	Stadium: Stadion Aldo Drosina; Attendance: 1,457; Referee: Duje Strukan

15 March 2026 26	Rijeka	0–2	Istra 1961	Rijeka
17:45 CET (UTC+01:00)	Husić (yellow card) 36'; Oreč (yellow card) 90+2'; Dantas (yellow card) 90+5'	Report	Prevljak 2'; Frederiksen 9'; Šepić (yellow card) 73'; Heister (yellow card) 90+5'	Stadium: Stadion Rujevica; Attendance: 5,897; Referee: Ante Terzić

20 March 2026 27	Istra 1961	2–1	Varaždin	Pula
18:00 CET (UTC+01:00)	Radošević (yellow card) 27' (goal) 81'; Heister 78'	Report	Latković 11'; Silić (yellow card) 26'	Stadium: Stadion Aldo Drosina; Attendance: 1,572; Referee: Ante Čulina

7 April 2026 28	Istra 1961	1–3	Hajduk Split	Pula
18:00 CEST (UTC+02:00)	Kadušić (yellow card) 10'; Frederiksen (yellow card) 49'; Agada 84'	Report	Livaja 23', 58' (yellow card) 34'; Pajaziti 51'; Sanyang (yellow card) 86'	Stadium: Stadion Aldo Drosina; Attendance: 6,028; Referee: Mateo Erceg

11 April 2026 29	Lokomotiva	2–0	Istra 1961	Zagreb
16:00 CEST (UTC+02:00)	Vasilj 19'; Bošković 45+1' (yellow card) 49'; Jukić (red card) 62'; Šitum (yellow card) 79'	Report	Albarracín (yellow card) 73'	Stadium: Stadion Maksimir; Attendance: 240; Referee: Ante Terzić

18 April 2026 30	Istra 1961	1–2	Vukovar 1991	Pula
18:45 CEST (UTC+02:00)	Rozić 21'; Lončar (yellow card) 49'; Obando (yellow card) 90+17'	Report	Puljić (yellow card) 31' (goal) 75' (pen.); Butić 36'; Čaić (yellow card) 45'; Kulušić (yellow card) 81'; Bulat (yellow card) 90+7'	Stadium: Stadion Aldo Drosina; Attendance: 1,255; Referee: Ante Čulina

22 April 2026 31	Istra 1961	0–2	Dinamo Zagreb	Pula
20:15 CEST (UTC+02:00)		Report	Stojković 23'; Beljo 45'	Stadium: Stadion Aldo Drosina; Attendance: 3,438; Referee: Ante Terzić

27 April 2026 32	Gorica	1–0	Istra 1961	Velika Gorica
18:00 CEST (UTC+02:00)	Pršir 31'; Erceg (yellow card) 50'; Perić (yellow card) 89'	Report	Rozić (yellow card) 45+1'; Kadušić (yellow card) 56'; Kumar (yellow card) 86'; Prevljak (yellow card) 89'	Stadium: Stadion Radnik; Attendance: 742; Referee: Patrik Kolarić

4 May 2026 33	Istra 1961	3–1	Slaven Belupo	Pula
18:00 CEST (UTC+02:00)	Prevljak 6', 24'; Rozić 63'	Report	Dabro 38'	Stadium: Stadion Aldo Drosina; Attendance: 1,063; Referee: Filip Dragašević

10 May 2026 34	Osijek	0–1	Istra 1961	Osijek
16:00 CEST (UTC+02:00)	Barić (yellow card) 13'; Kolarik (yellow card) 17'; Jakupović (yellow card) 62'; Barišić (yellow card) 67'	Report	Prevljak 45'; Ahmeti (yellow card) 74'; Miettinen (yellow card) 75'; Maurić (yellow card) 88'; Kumar (yellow card) 90+2'	Stadium: Opus Arena; Attendance: 2,859; Referee: Igor Pajač

17 May 2026 35	Istra 1961	0–0	Rijeka	Pula
18:45 CEST (UTC+02:00)	Prevljak (yellow card) 36'; Heister (yellow card) 84'	Report	Barco (yellow card) 43'; Pavić (yellow card) 43'; Legbo (red card) 56'	Stadium: Stadion Aldo Drosina; Attendance: 3,249; Referee: Ante Terzić

23 May 2026 36	Varaždin	2–0	Istra 1961	Varaždin
16:00 CEST (UTC+02:00)	Mamić 14' (pen.), 38' (pen.); Boršić (yellow card) 50'; Duvnjak (yellow card) 77'	Report	Taraba (yellow card) 13'; Kumar (yellow card) 25'; Radošević (yellow card) 37'	Stadium: Stadion Varteks; Attendance: 2,420; Referee: Ante Čulina

=== Croatian Football Cup ===
16 September 2025 R1	Neretva	1–2	Istra 1961	Metković
16:00 CEST (UTC+02:00)	A. Raguž (yellow card) 10'; Dodig (yellow card) 23'; Milićević 58' (yellow card) 82'; E. Raguž (yellow card) 80'	Report	Lawal 37'; Marešić (yellow card) 75'; Prevljak 77'	Stadium: Iza Vage; Attendance: 2,800; Referee: Ante Terzić

5 November 2025 R2	Kurilovec	2–1	Istra 1961	Velika Gorica
14:00 CET (UTC+01:00)	M. Pršir 13' (yellow card) 85'; Furmek 27'; Vujnović (yellow card) 48'; Novak (yellow card) 55'; Sedlaček (yellow card) 71'	Report	Ayuma (yellow card) 60'; Agada (yellow card) 62'; Lawal 75'; Taraba (yellow card) 84'	Stadium: SRC Udarnik; Attendance: 420; Referee: Zdenko Lovrić

== Player seasonal records ==
Updated 22 June 2026

=== Goals ===
Rank	Name	League	Cup	Total
1	(Bosnia and Herzegovina) Smail Prevljak	14	1	15
2	(Nigeria) Salim Fago Lawal	5	2	7
3	(Denmark) Emil Frederiksen	4	–	4
4	(Bosnia and Herzegovina) Stjepan Lončar	3	–	3
4	(Bosnia and Herzegovina) Vinko Rozić	3	–	3
6	(Netherlands) Saydou Bangura	2	–	2
6	(Croatia) Antonio Maurić	2	–	2
8	(Nigeria) Charles Agada	1	–	2
8	(Nigeria) Israel Isaac Ayuma	1	–	1
8	(Germany) Marcel Heister	1	–	1
8	(Bosnia and Herzegovina) Advan Kadušić	1	–	1
8	(Austria) Dario Marešić	1	–	1
8	(Croatia) Josip Radošević	1	–	1
TOTALS		39	3	42

Source: Competitive matches

=== Clean sheets ===
Rank	Name	League	Cup	Total
1	(Croatia) Franko Kolić	6	–	6
TOTALS		6	0	6

Source: Competitive matches

=== Disciplinary record ===
Number	Position	Player	HNL			Croatian Cup			Total		
Number	Position	Player	Yellow card	(yellow card) (yellow-red card)	Red card	Yellow card	(yellow card) (yellow-red card)	Red card	Yellow card	(yellow card) (yellow-red card)	Red card
1	GK	(Croatia) Franko Kolić	2	0	0	0	0	0	2	0	0
3	DF	(Tunisia) Mohamed Nasraoui	4	0	0	0	0	0	4	0	0
4	DF	(Austria) Dario Marešić	6	0	0	1	0	0	7	0	0
5	MF	(Croatia) Josip Radošević	4	0	0	0	0	0	4	0	0
7	FW	(Bosnia and Herzegovina) Vinko Rozić	6	0	0	0	0	0	6	0	0
8	MF	(Croatia) Antonio Maurić	5	0	0	0	0	0	5	0	0
9	FW	(Bosnia and Herzegovina) Smail Prevljak	4	0	0	0	0	0	4	0	0
10	MF	(Bosnia and Herzegovina) Stjepan Lončar	7	0	0	0	0	0	7	0	0
13	DF	(Croatia) Niko Šepić	2	0	0	0	0	0	2	0	0
16	DF	(Finland) Samuli Miettinen	2	0	0	0	0	0	2	0	0
17	MF	(Denmark) Emil Frederiksen	2	0	0	0	0	0	2	0	0
18	MF	(Nigeria) Israel Isaac Ayuma	1	0	0	1	0	0	2	0	0
20	MF	(Croatia) Dukan Ahmeti	1	0	0	0	0	0	1	0	0
21	DF	(Finland) Ville Koski	3	0	0	0	0	0	3	0	0
22	FW	(Iceland) Danijel Djuric	1	0	0	0	0	0	1	0	0
23	DF	(Spain) Alejandro Jay	1	0	0	0	0	0	1	0	0
24	DF	(Bosnia and Herzegovina) Filip Taraba	1	0	0	1	0	0	2	0	0
25	MF	(Argentina) Gustavo Albarracín	1	0	0	0	0	0	1	0	0
26	DF	(Germany) Marcel Heister	8	0	0	0	0	0	8	0	0
29	FW	(Ecuador) Allen Obando	1	0	0	0	0	0	1	0	0
38	DF	(Croatia) Raul Kumar	4	0	0	0	0	0	4	0	0
77	FW	(Nigeria) Charles Agada	0	0	0	1	0	0	1	0	0
97	DF	(Bosnia and Herzegovina) Advan Kadušić	5	0	0	0	0	0	5	0	0
TOTALS			71	0	0	4	0	0	75	0	0

=== Appearances and goals ===
Number	Position	Player	Apps	Goals	Apps	Goals	Apps	Goals
Number	Position	Player	Total		HNL (Note: First number represents appearances in starting eleven, while the second number indicates a substitute appearance.)		Croatian Cup	
1	GK	(Croatia) Franko Kolić	35	0	35+0	0	0+0	0
2	DF	(Canada) Jovan Ivanišević	7	0	1+4	0	1+1	0
3	DF	(Tunisia) Mohamed Nasraoui	21	0	15+4	0	2+0	0
4	DF	(Austria) Dario Marešić	21	1	20+0	1	1+0	0
5	MF	(Croatia) Josip Radošević	33	1	32+0	1	1+0	0
6	MF	(Iceland) Logi Hrafn Róbertsson	11	0	2+7	0	1+1	0
7	FW	(Bosnia and Herzegovina) Vinko Rozić	27	3	17+10	3	0+0	0
8	MF	(Croatia) Antonio Maurić	31	2	22+7	2	2+0	0
9	FW	(Bosnia and Herzegovina) Smail Prevljak	34	15	29+3	14	2+0	1
10	MF	(Bosnia and Herzegovina) Stjepan Lončar	33	3	32+1	3	0+0	0
11	FW	(Netherlands) Saydou Bangura	14	2	2+10	2	0+2	0
11	MF	(Croatia) Silvio Goričan	11	0	4+7	0	0+0	0
13	DF	(Croatia) Niko Šepić	13	0	6+7	0	0+0	0
16	DF	(Finland) Samuli Miettinen	11	0	9+2	0	0+0	0
17	MF	(Denmark) Emil Frederiksen	34	4	28+5	4	1+0	0
18	MF	(Nigeria) Israel Isaac Ayuma	17	1	9+7	1	1+0	0
20	MF	(Croatia) Dukan Ahmeti	14	0	6+7	0	0+1	0
21	DF	(Finland) Ville Koski	18	0	18+0	0	0+0	0
22	FW	(Iceland) Danijel Djuric	10	0	1+8	0	1+0	0
23	DF	(Spain) Alejandro Jay	11	0	3+7	0	1+0	0
23	MF	(Slovenia) Leo Štulac	10	0	8+2	0	0+0	0
24	DF	(Bosnia and Herzegovina) Filip Taraba	24	0	10+12	0	2+0	0
25	MF	(Argentina) Gustavo Albarracín	4	0	0+4	0	0+0	0
26	DF	(Germany) Marcel Heister	31	1	24+7	1	0+0	0
29	FW	(Ecuador) Allen Obando	6	0	1+5	0	0+0	0
30	MF	(Croatia) Nik Škafar Žužić	4	0	0+4	0	0+0	0
32	MF	(Croatia) Dominik Celija	3	0	0+2	0	0+1	0
38	DF	(Croatia) Raul Kumar	21	0	20+1	0	0+0	0
40	GK	(Croatia) Jan Paus-Kunšt	3	0	1+0	0	2+0	0
41	MF	(Croatia) Marin Žgomba	2	0	0+1	0	1+0	0
44	DF	(Slovenia) Rene Hrvatin	5	0	4+1	0	0+0	0
70	FW	(Nigeria) Salim Fago Lawal	19	7	16+1	5	2+0	2
77	FW	(Nigeria) Charles Agada	15	1	0+14	1	0+1	0
97	DF	(Bosnia and Herzegovina) Advan Kadušić	30	1	21+8	1	1+0	0
