= 2026–27 Croatian Football League =

SuperSport Hrvatska nogometna liga
- Season: 2026–27
- Dates: 31 July 2026 – 22 May 2027
- Top goalscorer: Dion Drena Beljo (12)

The 2026–27 Croatian Football League (officially SuperSport Hrvatska nogometna liga for sponsorship reasons) is the 36th season of the Croatian top division football, the national championship for men's association football teams in Croatia, since its establishment in 1992. The season started on 31 July 2026.

The league is contested by 10 teams.

== Teams ==
The following teams are competing in the 2026–27 HNL.

=== Club changes ===
NK Rudeš were promoted from the 2025–26 Prva NL after a two years absence from the top flight while HNK Vukovar 1991 were relegated to the 2026–27 Prva NL after one season back in the top flight.

=== Stadia and locations ===
Dinamo Zagreb	Gorica	Hajduk Split	Istra 1961
Stadion Maksimir	Gradski stadion Velika Gorica	Stadion Poljud	Stadion Aldo Drosina
Capacity: 24,851	Capacity: 4,536	Capacity: 33,987	Capacity: 9,921
Lokomotiva	Locations of teams in 2026–27 HNL		Osijek
Stadion Maksimir	Locations of teams in 2026–27 HNL		Opus Arena
Capacity: 24,851	Locations of teams in 2026–27 HNL		Capacity: 13,005
Rijeka	Rudeš	Slaven Belupo	Varaždin
Stadion Rujevica	Gradski stadion Velika Gorica	Stadion Ivan Kušek-Apaš	Stadion Varteks
Capacity: 8,191	Capacity: 4,536	Capacity: 3,054	Capacity: 8,818

Team	City	Stadium	Capacity	Ref.
Dinamo Zagreb	Zagreb	Maksimir	24,851	
Gorica	Velika Gorica	ŠRC Velika Gorica	4,536	
Hajduk Split	Split	Poljud	33,987	
Istra 1961	Pula	Stadion Aldo Drosina	9,921	
Lokomotiva	Zagreb	Maksimir	24,851	
Osijek	Osijek	Gradski vrt	18,856	
Rijeka	Rijeka	Rujevica	8,191	
Rudeš	Zagreb	ŠRC Velika Gorica	4,536	
Slaven Belupo	Koprivnica	Stadion Ivan Kušek-Apaš	3,054	
Varaždin	Varaždin	Stadion Varteks	8,818	

Rank	Counties of Croatia	Number of teams	Club(s)
1	City of Zagreb	3	Dinamo Zagreb, Lokomotiva, Rudeš
2	Istria	1	Istra 1961
2	Koprivnica-Križevci	1	Slaven Belupo
2	Osijek-Baranja	1	Osijek
2	Primorje-Gorski Kotar	1	Rijeka
2	Split-Dalmatia	1	Hajduk Split
2	Varaždin	1	Varaždin
2	Zagreb County	1	Gorica

=== Personnel and kits ===
Club	Manager	Captain	Kit manufacturer	Sponsors
Dinamo Zagreb	(Croatia) Jerko Leko	(Croatia) Josip Mišić	Castore	Favbet
Gorica	(Croatia) Damir Krznar	(Croatia) Jurica Pršir	Alpas	Kömmerling
Hajduk Split	(Uruguay) Gonzalo García	(Croatia) Marko Livaja	Adidas	Tommy
Istra 1961	(Spain) Javier Cabello	(Croatia) Josip Radošević	Joma	Germania
Lokomotiva	(Croatia) Nikica Jelavić	(Croatia) Matija Subotić	Macron	Favbet
Osijek	(Argentina) Federico Bessone	(Croatia) Marko Malenica	2Rule	Mészáros és Mészáros Kft.
Rijeka	(Slovenia) Matjaž Kek	(Croatia) Ante Majstorović	Joma	Favbet
Rudeš	(Croatia) Alen Peternac	(Croatia) Vedran Celjak	Adidas	RIZK
Slaven Belupo	(Croatia) Silvijo Čabraja	(Croatia) Tomislav Božić	Jako	Belupo
Varaždin	(Croatia) Nikola Šafarić	(Croatia) Roberto Punčec	Macron	BURAI

=== Managerial changes ===
Team	Outgoing manager	Manner of departure	Date of vacancy	Position in table	Replaced by	Date of appointment
Rijeka	(Spain) Víctor Sánchez	Mutual consent	27 May 2026	Pre-season	(Slovenia) Matjaž Kek	7 June 2026
Istra 1961	(Croatia) Krešimir Režić	Contract expired	29 May 2026	Pre-season	(Spain) Javier Cabello	9 June 2026
Osijek	(Croatia) Tomislav Radotić	Contract expired	11 June 2026	Pre-season	(Argentina) Federico Bessone	23 June 2026
Slaven Belupo	(Croatia) Mario Gregurina	Sacked	31 August 2026	9th	(Croatia) Silvijo Čabraja	1 September 2026
Dinamo Zagreb	(Croatia) Mario Kovačević	Sacked	1 November 2026	2nd	(Croatia) Jerko Leko	1 November 2026
Gorica	(Croatia) Mario Carević	Sacked	8 November 2026	10th	(Croatia) Damir Krznar	9 November 2026

== League table ==
Pos	Team	Pld	W	D	L	GF	GA	GD	Pts	Qualification or relegation (Note: The 2026–27 Croatian Football Cup winners qualify for the Europa League first qualifying round (or the second-placed team if the Croatian Cup winners finish first). If the Croatian Cup winners finish in the top three, the second Conference League second qualifying round spot will be passed to the fourth-placed team.)
1	Hajduk Split	14	10	2	2	29	12	+17	32	Qualification to Champions League second qualifying round
2	Dinamo Zagreb	13	9	1	3	31	17	+14	28	Qualification to Conference League second qualifying round
3	Varaždin	14	6	4	4	19	14	+5	22	Qualification to Conference League second qualifying round
4	Rijeka	13	6	3	4	21	18	+3	21	
5	Osijek	13	6	2	5	22	18	+4	20	
6	Istra 1961	14	5	4	5	26	22	+4	19	
7	Slaven Belupo	13	5	1	7	19	28	−9	16	
8	Rudeš	14	5	1	8	16	29	−13	16	
9	Lokomotiva	14	3	2	9	15	23	−8	11	
10	Gorica	14	1	4	9	10	27	−17	7	Relegation to First Football League

Updated to match(es) played on 22 November 2026. Source: SuperSport HNL
Rules for classification: 1) Points; 2) Head-to-head points; 3) Head-to-head goal difference; 4) Head-to-head goals scored (at home if two teams tied); 5) Goal difference; 6) Goals scored; 7) Play-off
(Note: Criteria 2-4 and 7 is only used if deciding champion, teams to international competition or teams for relegation and in that case criteria 6 will not be used).

== Results ==
Each team plays home-and-away against every other team in the league twice, for a total of 36 matches each played.

Home \ Away	DIN	GOR	HAJ	IST	LOK	OSI	RIJ	RUD	SLA	VAR	DIN	GOR	HAJ	IST	LOK	OSI	RIJ	RUD	SLA	VAR
Dinamo Zagreb		1–0	a	3–2	3–2		2–1	4–0	2–0	3–1			a							
Gorica			1–2		0–0	0–2	0–0	1–2	3–5	2–2										
Hajduk Split	2–1	5–0		2–2	2–0	4–0	a		1–0	1–0	a						a			
Istra 1961	2–2	0–1	2–2		2–3		3–1	3–2	3–0											
Lokomotiva		3–1	1–2	2–0		1–3	1–1	0–1		0–1										
Osijek	4–2	1–1	0–1	1–3	1–0			0–1	3–0											
Rijeka		2–0	3–0	3–2		4–1		2–1		1–1			a							
Rudeš	1–0		0–4		4–1	1–6	1–2		2–2	0–2										
Slaven Belupo	1–5	2–0		0–2	2–1		4–1			1–4										
Varaždin	1–3		2–1	0–0			2–0	2–0	1–2											

Updated to match(es) played on 22 November 2026. Source: SuperSport HNL (in Croatian)
Legend: Blue = home team win; Yellow = draw; Red = away team win.

== Statistics ==
=== Top scorers ===
As of 7 November 2026

Rank	Player	Club	Goals
1	(Croatia) Dion Drena Beljo	Dinamo Zagreb	12
2	(Denmark) Emil Frederiksen	Istra 1961	11
3	(North Macedonia) Ilija Nestorovski	Slaven Belupo	9
4	(Bosnia and Herzegovina) Hamza Jaganjac	Istra 1961	5
4	(Mexico) Armando León	Osijek	5
4	(Bosnia and Herzegovina) Nail Omerović	Osijek	5
4	(Croatia) Michele Šego	Hajduk Split	5
4	(Croatia) Toni Fruk	Rijeka	5
4	(Croatia) Luka Mamić	Varaždin	5
10	(England) Daniel Adu-Adjei	Rijeka	4
10	(Italy) Samuele Vignato	Rijeka	4
10	(Croatia) Bruno Bogojević	Gorica	4
