= Šehić =

Šehić (Bosnian pronunciation: [ʃěːxitɕ]) is a Bosnian surname. Notable people with the surname include:

- Asim Šehić (born 1981), Bosnian footballer
- Edin Šehić (born 1995), Bosnian footballer
- Eldar Šehić (born 2000), Bosnian footballer
- Faruk Šehić (born 1970), Bosnian poet, novelist and short story writer
- Ibrahim Šehić (born 1988), Bosnian footballer
