= Filip Brekalo =

Filip Brekalo may refer to:

- Filip Brekalo (footballer, born 2002), Croatian football left-back for GOŠK Gabela
- Filip Brekalo (footballer, born 2003), Croatian football defender for Reggiana
