= Demirel Hodžić =

Swedish footballer (born 2005)

Personal information
- Date of birth: 7 March 2005 (age 21)
- Place of birth: Lerum, Sweden
- Height: 1.94 m (6 ft 4 in)
- Position: Defensive midfielder

Team information
- Current team: Istra 1961
- Number: 5

Youth career
- –2022: IFK Göteborg
- 2022: → Bologna (loan)
- 2022–2024: Bologna
- 2024–2026: AC Milan

Senior career*
Years	Team	Apps	(Gls)
2024–2026	Milan Futuro (res.)	30	(2)
2026	AC Milan	0	(0)
2026	→ Örgryte IS (loan)	7	(0)
2026–	Istra 1961	5	(0)

International career^{‡}
2022	Sweden U19	2	(0)
2024	Sweden U21	2	(0)
- * Club domestic league appearances and goals as of 7 November 2026 ‡ National team caps and goals as of 17 November 2024

Demirel Hodžić (born 7 March 2005) is a Swedish professional footballer who plays as a defensive midfielder for SuperSport HNL club Istra 1961. He is a former Swedish youth international.

== Club career ==
=== Early career ===
Hodžić started his career in the youth academy of IFK Göteborg. After his spell there, he moved to Italy and joined the youth academy of Serie A club Bologna, initially on a six-month loan, and his move was made permanently afterwards.

=== AC Milan ===
On 23 August 2024, he joined fellow Serie A club AC Milan's newly created reserve team Milan Futuro.

==== Loan to Örgryte IS ====
On 18 March 2026, Hodžić returned to his native Sweden and joined newly Allsvenskan promoted club Örgryte IS, on loan for the 2026 season, until 31 December. He made his debut on 5 April 2026, substituting Benjamin Laturnus at the 82nd minute of a 1–1 home draw Allsvenskan match against Malmö FF. Hodžić's loan-spell expired on 31 July 2026, and he returned to Milan Futuro.

=== Istra 1961 ===
On 7 September 2026, he moved to Croatia and joined SuperSport HNL club Istra 1961, on a permanent transfer ahead of the 2026–27 season.

== International career ==
Hodžić holds dual Swedish and Bosnian citizenship, being eligible to represent either nation. He has represented Sweden at under-19 and under-21 levels.

== Career statistics ==
As of match played 23 May 2026

Appearances and goals by club, season and competition
Club	Season	League			Cup		Continental		Other		Total	
Club	Season	Division	Apps	Goals	Apps	Goals	Apps	Goals	Apps	Goals	Apps	Goals
Milan Futuro	2024–25	Serie C	18	2	1 (Note: Appearance in Coppa Italia Serie C)	0	—		—		19	2
Milan Futuro	2025–26	Serie D	12	0	3 (Note: Appearances in Coppa Italia Serie D)	0	—		—		15	0
Milan Futuro	Total		30	2	4	0	—		0	0	34	2
Örgryte IS (loan)	2026	Allsvenskan	7	0	—		—		0	0	7	0
Örgryte IS (loan)	Total		7	0	—		—		0	0	7	0
Career total			37	2	4	0	0	0	0	0	41	2
