= Nik Škafar Žužić =

Croatian footballer (born 2009)

Personal information
- Date of birth: 3 June 2009 (age 17)
- Place of birth: Postojna, Slovenia
- Position: Winger

Team information
- Current team: Istra 1961
- Number: 30

Youth career
- Rijeka
- 2014–2025: Istra 1961

Senior career*
| Years | Team | Apps | (Gls) |
| 2025– | Istra 1961 | 12 | (1) |

International career^{‡}
| 2024 | Croatia U15 | 2 | (0) |
| 2025 | Croatia U16 | 3 | (0) |
| 2025– | Croatia U17 | 17 | (7) |
- * Club domestic league appearances and goals as of 17 June 2026 ‡ National team caps and goals as of 17 June 2026

Nik Škafar Žužić (born 3 June 2009) is a professional footballer who plays as a winger for Istra 1961. Born in Slovenia, he is a youth international for Croatia.

== Club career ==
Born in Postojna, Slovenia, Škafar Žužić grew up in Novigrad, in the Istria County, where he first played for NK Novigrad, before joining the youth academy of Rijeka.

In July 2023, he signed for Istra 1961, where he was first called to Oriol Riera's Croatian Football League team during the 2025–26 season.

Škafar Žužić made his professional debut with Istra 1961 in a 3–2 away League loss to Vukovar '91 on 7 February 2026.

== International career ==
Škafar Žužić was born in Slovenia to a Croatian father and Slovenian mother. He is a youth international for Croatia, having played for the under-15, under-16 and under-17.

With the latter, he played a central role in Croatia's run to the 2026 Euro under-17, narrowly missing the semi-final of the tournament despite beating Ebrima Tunkara's Spain 3–2. Despite the inaugural loss against future finalist Belgium, Škafar Žužić was described as a constat attacking threat for his team, with two goals and an assist against host Estonia.

== Style of play ==
In the aftermath of his professional debut and prouesses with Croatia's under-17, Škafar Žužić was described as a winger with good ball control, speed and dribbling.

Growing up as a midfielder, he cites Luka Modrić and Neymar as his models.
