= Jovan Ivanišević =

Canadian soccer player

Personal information
- Date of birth: January 19, 2005 (age 21)
- Place of birth: London, Ontario, Canada
- Height: 1.91 m (6 ft 3 in)
- Position: Centre-back

Team information
- Current team: Sarajevo
- Number: 6

Youth career
- Alliance FC
- 2021–2023: Toronto FC

Senior career*
Years	Team	Apps	(Gls)
2023	Toronto FC II	1	(0)
2024–2026	Istra 1961	12	(0)
2025	→ Bologna (loan)	0	(0)
2026	→ Sarajevo (loan)	11	(2)
2026–	Sarajevo	11	(0)

International career^{‡}
2024	Canada U20	1	(0)
2026–	Canada	3	(0)
- * Club domestic league appearances and goals as of November 8, 2026 ‡ National team caps and goals as of November 13, 2026

Jovan Ivanišević (Serbian: Јован Иванишевић; born January 19, 2005) is a Canadian professional soccer player who plays as a centre-back for Bosnian Premier League club Sarajevo and the Canada national team.

== Early life ==
Ivanišević played youth soccer with Alliance FC, before joining the Toronto FC Academy in 2021. He also represented Team Ontario at the 2022 Canada Summer Games.

== Club career ==
Ivanišević made his senior debut on April 30, 2023, with Toronto FC II in MLS Next Pro.

In the summer of 2023, he went to Croatia, going on trial with Istra 1961, as part of the club's efforts scouting players of Croatian descent. In May 2024, Ivanišević signed a professional contract with Istra until 2026. In November 2024, he extended his contract with Istra, until 2029. In January 2025, he joined Italian side Bologna on loan with an option to buy, where he played with their U20 side, with whom he scored twice in 19 appearances.

In February 2026, Ivanišević was loaned to Bosnian Premier League club Sarajevo through the end of 2026. He made his debut on February 15, starting and playing the full match in a 1–0 victory against FK Sloga Doboj. On April 18, he scored his first goal in a match against Radnik Bijeljina. In August 2026, Sarajevo executed the purchase option on Ivanisevic, signing him permanently to the club.

== International career ==
Born in Canada, Ivanišević is of Serbian descent. In June 2024, Ivanišević was called up to the Canada U20 national team for a set of friendlies in preparation for the 2024 CONCACAF U-20 Championship.

In February 2025, Ivanišević was named to the Canada provisional roster list for the 2025 CONCACAF Nations League Finals. In September 2026, he received his first senior call-up ahead of a series of friendlies. He made his debut in the first match on September 26 against Chile.

== Career statistics ==
=== Club ===
As of match played November 8, 2026

Appearances and goals by club, season and competition
Club	Season	League			National cup (Note: Includes Croatian Cup, Bosnian Cup)		Continental		Other		Total	
Club	Season	Division	Apps	Goals	Apps	Goals	Apps	Goals	Apps	Goals	Apps	Goals
Toronto FC II	2023	MLS Next Pro	1	0	—		—		—		1	0
Istra 1961	2024–25	HNL	7	0	1	0	—		—		8	0
Istra 1961	2025–26	HNL	5	0	2	0	—		—		7	0
Istra 1961	Total		12	0	3	0	0	0	0	0	15	0
Sarajevo (loan)	2025–26	Bosnian Premier League	11	2	1	0	0	0	0	0	12	2
Sarajevo	2026–27	Bosnian Premier League	11	0	1	0	0	0	—		12	0
Sarajevo	Sarajevo total		22	2	2	0	0	0	0	0	24	2
Career total			35	2	5	0	0	0	0	0	40	2

=== International ===
As of match played November 13, 2026

Appearances and goals by national team and year
National team	Year	Apps	Goals
Canada	2026	3	0
Total		3	0
