= Stjepan Lončar =

Bosnian footballer (born 1996)

- Lončar with Persija in 2026

Personal information
- Date of birth: 10 November 1996 (age 30)
- Place of birth: Mostar, Bosnia and Herzegovina
- Height: 1.87 m (6 ft 2 in)
- Position: Midfielder

Team information
- Current team: Persija Jakarta
- Number: 33

Youth career
- 2003–2016: Široki Brijeg

Senior career*
Years	Team	Apps	(Gls)
2016–2018	Široki Brijeg	48	(3)
2018–2021	Rijeka	89	(8)
2021–2024	Ferencváros	32	(7)
2022–2023	→ Kortrijk (loan)	22	(0)
2023	→ Astana (loan)	7	(0)
2024–2025	Lech Poznań	2	(0)
2024	Lech Poznań II	1	(0)
2025–2026	Istra 1961	47	(8)
2026–	Persija Jakarta	9	(3)

International career
2014–2015	Bosnia and Herzegovina U19	15	(2)
2017–2018	Bosnia and Herzegovina U21	11	(0)
2018–2021	Bosnia and Herzegovina	11	(0)
- * Club domestic league appearances and goals as of 8 November 2026

Stjepan Lončar (pronounced [stjêpan lǒntʃar]; born 10 November 1996) is a Bosnian professional footballer who plays as a midfielder for Super League club Persija Jakarta.

== Club career ==
=== Early career ===
Lončar came through Široki Brijeg's youth academy, which he joined in 2003. He made his professional debut against Vitez on 24 July 2016 at the age of 19. On 20 September 2017, he scored his first professional goal against Radnik Bijeljina, which sent his team through in their cup tie.

=== Rijeka ===
In June 2018, Lončar signed a three-year deal with Croatian side Rijeka. He made his official debut for the squad on 3 August against Inter Zaprešić. On 10 February 2019, he scored his first goal for Rijeka against the same opponent. He won his first trophy with the club on 22 May, by beating Dinamo Zagreb in the Croatian Cup final. On 3 March 2021, he played his 100th game for the team against Osijek.

=== Ferencváros ===
In July, Lončar was transferred to Hungarian outfit Ferencváros for an undisclosed fee. He made his competitive debut for the side against Kisvárda on 31 July. On 19 September, he scored his first goal for Ferencváros in a Magyar Kupa match against Hatvan.

Seven weeks later, he scored his first league goal in a triumph over Kisvárda. He won his first title with the club on 24 April 2022, when they were crowned league champions. In September, Lončar was sent on a season-long loan to Belgian team Kortrijk. In July 2023, he was loaned to Kazakh side Astana until the end of the season.

=== Lech Poznań ===
On 6 September 2024, Lončar moved to Polish club Lech Poznań on a contract until June 2025. He debuted officially for the team on 14 September in a 5–0 win over Jagiellonia, and provided an assist to Lech's fourth goal.

=== Istra 1961 ===
On 3 February 2025, after being left out of Lech's roster for the winter training camp, Lončar returned to Croatia to join Istra 1961 on a two-and-a-half-year deal.

== International career ==
Lončar represented Bosnia and Herzegovina at various youth levels.

In January 2018, he received his first senior call-up, for friendly games against the United States and Mexico. He debuted against the latter on 31 January. Lončar retired from international football on 30 November 2023.

== Personal life ==
Lončar married his long-time girlfriend Stela in January 2025. His father Robert was also a professional footballer.

== Career statistics ==
=== Club ===
As of match played 5 September 2026

Appearances and goals by club, season and competition
Club	Season	League			National cup (Note: Includes Bosnian Cup, Croatian Cup, Magyar Kupa, Belgian Cup, Polish Cup)		Continental		Total	
Club	Season	Division	Apps	Goals	Apps	Goals	Apps	Goals	Apps	Goals
Široki Brijeg	2016–17	Bosnian Premier League	23	0	7	0	0	0	30	0
Široki Brijeg	2017–18	Bosnian Premier League	25	3	4	1	4 (Note: Appearances in UEFA Europa League)	0	33	4
Široki Brijeg	Total		48	3	11	1	4	0	63	4
Rijeka	2018–19	Croatian Football League	27	2	4	1	0	0	31	3
Rijeka	2019–20	Croatian Football League	31	4	5	1	4	1	40	6
Rijeka	2020–21	Croatian Football League	31	2	3	0	8	1	42	3
Rijeka	Total		89	8	12	2	12	2	113	12
Ferencváros	2021–22	Nemzeti Bajnokság I	19	2	5	1	8 (Note: Two appearances in UEFA Champions League; six appearances in UEFA Europa League)	0	32	3
Ferencváros	2022–23	Nemzeti Bajnokság I	1	0	0	0	2 (Note: Appearances in UEFA Champions League)	0	3	0
Ferencváros	2023–24	Nemzeti Bajnokság I	12	5	3	0	0	0	15	5
Ferencváros	Total		32	7	8	1	10	0	50	8
Kortrijk (loan)	2022–23	Belgian Pro League	22	0	3	0	—		25	0
Astana (loan)	2023	Kazakhstan Premier League	7	0	0	0	11 (Note: Two appearances in UEFA Champions League; two appearances in UEFA Europa League; seven appearances, one goal in UEFA Conference League)	1	18	1
Lech Poznań	2024–25	Ekstraklasa	2	0	1	0	—		3	0
Lech Poznań II	2024–25	III liga, group II	1	0	0	0	—		1	0
Istra 1961	2024–25	Croatian Football League	14	5	2	0	—		16	5
Istra 1961	2025–26	Croatian Football League	33	3	0	0	—		33	3
Istra 1961	Total		47	8	2	0	—		49	8
Persija Jakarta	2026–27	Super League	1	0	0	0	—		1	0
Career total			249	26	37	4	37	3	323	33

=== International ===
Appearances and goals by national team and year
National team	Year	Apps	Goals
Bosnia and Herzegovina
Bosnia and Herzegovina	2018	2	0
Bosnia and Herzegovina	2019	2	0
Bosnia and Herzegovina	2020	4	0
Bosnia and Herzegovina	2021	3	0
Total		11	0

== Honours ==
Široki Brijeg

- Bosnian Cup: 2016–17

Rijeka

- Croatian Cup: 2018–19, 2019–20

Ferencváros

- Nemzeti Bajnokság I: 2021–22, 2023–24
- Magyar Kupa: 2021–22

Persija Jakarta

- Piala Presiden third place: 2026
