= Asim Šehić =

Bosnian-Herzegovinian footballer

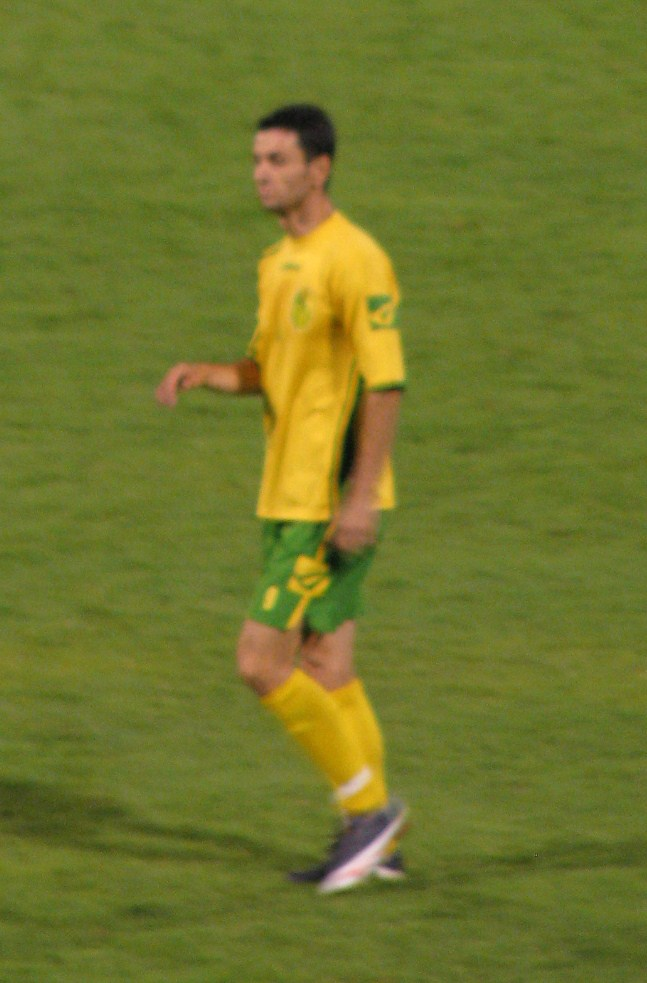

Personal information
- Date of birth: 16 June 1981 (age 45)
- Place of birth: Jelovo Brdo, SFR Yugoslavia
- Height: 1.80 m (5 ft 11 in)
- Position: Striker

Youth career
- Istra

Senior career*
Years	Team	Apps	(Gls)
1999–2002	Istra Pula		
2002	VEGA Olimpija	1	(0)
2003	NK Ljubljana	4	(0)
2003–2005	Pula 1856	70	(20)
2006–2007	Neuchâtel Xamax	26	(5)
2007–2008	Slaven Belupo	24	(7)
2009–2011	Istra 1961	65	(28)
2011	Al-Faisaly	10	(2)

International career
2001	Croatia U20	3	(1)
2004	Bosnia and Herzegovina	1	(0)
- * Club domestic league appearances and goals as of 5 September

Asim Šehić (born 16 June 1981) is a Bosnian-Herzegovinian retired footballer, last playing in Saudi Arabia for Al-Faisaly.

== International career ==
He made his senior debut for Bosnia and Herzegovina in an August 2004 friendly match against France, coming on as a second-half substitute for Sergej Barbarez. It remained his sole international appearance. Previously, he played three matches for the Croatia U20 team, scoring one goal.
