= Smail Prevljak =

Bosnian footballer (born 1995)

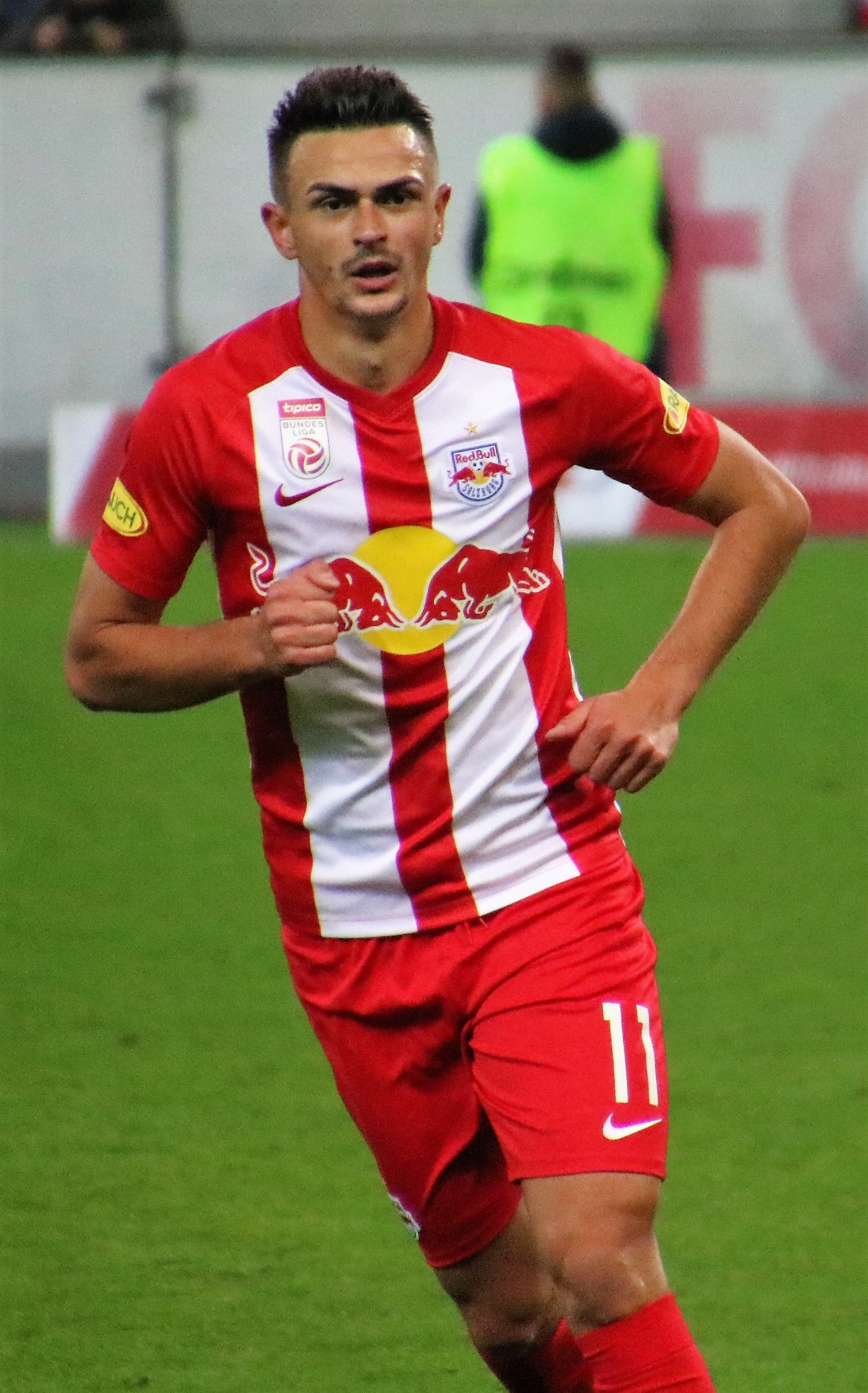
- Prevljak playing for Red Bull Salzburg in 2019

Personal information
- Date of birth: 10 May 1995 (age 31)
- Place of birth: Konjic, Bosnia and Herzegovina
- Height: 1.87 m (6 ft 2 in)
- Position: Forward

Team information
- Current team: Dinamo Zagreb
- Number: 14

Youth career
- Igman Konjic
- 2013–2014: RB Leipzig

Senior career*
Years	Team	Apps	(Gls)
2014	RB Leipzig II	2	(1)
2014–2015	RB Leipzig	1	(0)
2014–2015	→ Red Bull Salzburg (loan)	1	(0)
2014–2017	FC Liefering	45	(24)
2015–2020	Red Bull Salzburg	34	(12)
2017–2018	→ SV Mattersburg (loan)	32	(16)
2020	→ Eupen (loan)	5	(4)
2020–2023	Eupen	87	(31)
2023–2025	Hertha BSC	31	(5)
2025–2026	Istra 1961	32	(14)
2026–	Dinamo Zagreb	5	(2)

International career
2015	Bosnia and Herzegovina U21	5	(0)
2018–2023	Bosnia and Herzegovina	27	(6)
- * Club domestic league appearances and goals as of 18 October 2026

Smail Prevljak (pronounced [smǎil prěʋʎak]; born 10 May 1995) is a Bosnian professional footballer who plays as a forward for SuperSport HNL club Dinamo Zagreb.

Prevljak started his professional career at RB Leipzig, playing mainly in its reserve team. In 2014, he was loaned to Red Bull Salzburg, who assigned him to FC Liefering later that year. The following year, he moved to Red Bull Salzburg on permanent basis. He was sent on loan to SV Mattersburg in 2017 and to Eupen in 2020, with whom he signed permanently later that year. In 2023, Prevljak joined Hertha BSC. Two years later, he moved to Istra 1961. In 2026, he signed with Dinamo Zagreb.

A former youth international for Bosnia and Herzegovina, Prevljak made his senior international debut in 2018, earning over 20 caps until 2023.

== Club career ==
=== Early career ===
Prevljak started playing football at his hometown club Igman Konjic, before joining the youth academy of German team RB Leipzig in 2013. He made his professional debut against VfR Aalen on 2 August 2014 at the age of 19.

=== Red Bull Salzburg ===
In August, Prevljak was sent on a season-long loan to Austrian outfit Red Bull Salzburg. He made his official debut for the side on 9 November against Rheindorf Altach. On 3 October, he scored his first professional goal playing for Red Bull Salzburg's feeder squad, FC Liefering, in a triumph over Wacker Innsbruck.

In June 2015, he moved to Red Bull Salzburg permanently. On 23 August, he scored his first goal for the team against Austria Wien. Prevljak scored his first career hat-trick in a triumph over Floridsdorfer AC on 6 November.

In April 2016, he suffered a severe knee injury, which was diagnosed as an anterior cruciate ligament tear and was ruled out for at least six months. Over ten months after the injury, on 24 February 2017, he returned to the pitch.

In June, Prevljak was loaned to SV Mattersburg until the end of the season.

In June 2018, he signed a new four-year contract with Red Bull Salzburg. On 16 December, he scored four goals in a defeat of SKN St. Pölten. He won his first trophy with the club on 1 May 2019, by beating Rapid Wien in the Austrian Cup final.

=== Eupen ===
In January 2020, Prevljak was sent on a six-month loan to Belgian side Eupen. He made his competitive debut for the squad against Sint-Truiden on 8 February and managed to score a goal.

In August, Eupen signed him on a three-year deal.

He scored his first hat-trick for the club in a win over Charleroi on 17 April 2021.

=== Hertha BSC ===
In July 2023, Prevljak joined Hertha BSC on a contract until June 2025. He debuted officially for the team on 4 August against Wehen Wiesbaden. On 26 August, he scored his first goal for Hertha BSC in a beating of Greuther Fürth.

=== Later stage of career ===
In July 2025, Prevljak moved to Croatian outfit Istra 1961.

In July 2026, he switched to Dinamo Zagreb.

== International career ==
Prevljak was a member of the Bosnia and Herzegovina under-21 team under coach Darko Nestorović.

In March 2018, he received his first senior call up, for friendly games against Bulgaria and Senegal. He debuted against the former on 23 March.

On 15 November 2020, in a 2020–21 UEFA Nations League A match against the Netherlands, Prevljak scored his first senior international goal.

== Personal life ==
Prevljak married his long-time girlfriend Nejra in March 2017. Together they have two sons named Sami and Kani.

== Career statistics ==
=== Club ===
As of match played 18 October 2026

Appearances and goals by club, season and competition
Club	Season	League			National cup (Note: Includes Austrian Cup, Belgian Cup, DFB-Pokal, Croatian Cup)		Continental		Total	
Club	Season	Division	Apps	Goals	Apps	Goals	Apps	Goals	Apps	Goals
RB Leipzig II	2013–14	Sachsenliga	2	1	–		–		2	1
RB Leipzig	2014–15	2. Bundesliga	1	0	0	0	–		1	0
Red Bull Salzburg (loan)	2014–15	Austrian Bundesliga	1	0	0	0	0	0	1	0
FC Liefering (loan)	2014–15	2. Liga	17	14	–		–		17	14
FC Liefering (loan)	2015–16	2. Liga	14	8	–		–		14	8
FC Liefering (loan)	2016–17	2. Liga	14	2	–		–		14	2
FC Liefering (loan)	Total		45	24	–		–		45	24
Red Bull Salzburg	2015–16	Austrian Bundesliga	7	1	2	1	1 (Note: Appearance in UEFA Champions League)	0	10	2
Red Bull Salzburg	2018–19	Austrian Bundesliga	23	10	4	2	5 (Note: One appearance in UEFA Champions League; four appearances in UEFA Europa League)	0	32	12
Red Bull Salzburg	2019–20	Austrian Bundesliga	4	1	1	0	0	0	5	1
Red Bull Salzburg	Total		34	12	7	3	6	0	47	15
SV Mattersburg (loan)	2017–18	Austrian Bundesliga	32	16	4	2	–		36	18
Eupen (loan)	2019–20	Belgian Pro League	5	4	–		–		5	4
Eupen	2020–21	Belgian Pro League	27	16	2	0	–		29	16
Eupen	2021–22	Belgian Pro League	30	9	5	7	–		35	16
Eupen	2022–23	Belgian Pro League	30	6	0	0	–		30	6
Eupen	Total		92	35	7	7	–		99	42
Hertha BSC	2023–24	2. Bundesliga	21	4	3	0	–		24	4
Hertha BSC	2024–25	2. Bundesliga	10	1	0	0	–		10	1
Hertha BSC	Total		31	5	3	0	–		34	5
Istra 1961	2025–26	Croatian Football League	32	14	2	1	–		34	15
Dinamo Zagreb	2026–27	Croatian Football League	5	2	1	2	3 (Note: Two appearances in UEFA Champions League, one appearance in UEFA Europa League)	0	9	4
Career total			275	109	24	16	8	0	308	124

=== International ===
Appearances and goals by national team and year
National team	Year	Apps	Goals
Bosnia and Herzegovina
Bosnia and Herzegovina	2018	1	0
Bosnia and Herzegovina	2019	0	0
Bosnia and Herzegovina	2020	4	1
Bosnia and Herzegovina	2021	11	3
Bosnia and Herzegovina	2022	6	2
Bosnia and Herzegovina	2023	5	0
Total		27	6

Scores and results list Bosnia and Herzegovina's goal tally first, score column indicates score after each Prevljak goal.

List of international goals scored by Smail Prevljak
No.	Date	Venue	Cap	Opponent	Score	Result	Competition
1	15 November 2020	Johan Cruyff Arena, Amsterdam, Netherlands	4	Netherlands	1–3	1–3	2020–21 UEFA Nations League A
2	4 September 2021	Bilino Polje, Zenica, Bosnia and Herzegovina	11	Kuwait	1–0	1–0	Friendly
3	9 October 2021	Astana Arena, Nur-Sultan, Kazakhstan	13	Kazakhstan	1–0	2–0	2022 FIFA World Cup qualification
4	9 October 2021	Astana Arena, Nur-Sultan, Kazakhstan	13	Kazakhstan	2–0	2–0	2022 FIFA World Cup qualification
5	4 June 2022	Helsinki Olympic Stadium, Helsinki, Finland	19	Finland	1–1	1–1	2022–23 UEFA Nations League B
6	7 June 2022	Bilino Polje, Zenica, Bosnia and Herzegovina	20	Romania	1–0	1–0	2022–23 UEFA Nations League B

== Honours ==
Red Bull Salzburg

- Austrian Bundesliga: 2018–19
- Austrian Cup: 2018–19
