= Allen Obando =

Ecuadorian footballer (born 2006)

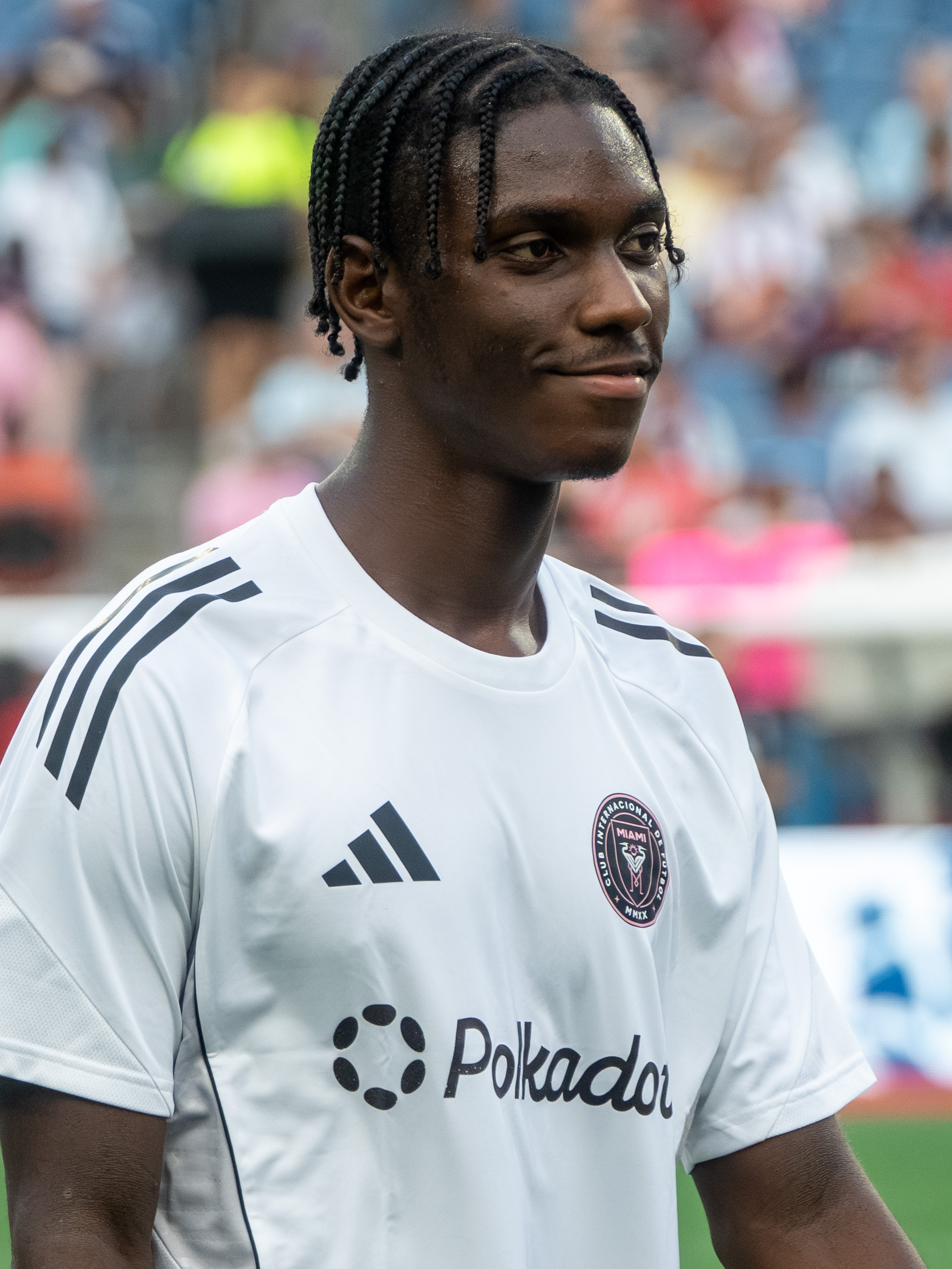
- Obando with Inter Miami in 2025

Personal information
- Full name: Allen Aldair Obando Ayoví
- Date of birth: 13 June 2006 (age 20)
- Place of birth: Quito, Ecuador
- Height: 1.89 m (6 ft 2 in)
- Position: Forward

Team information
- Current team: Nacional (on loan from Barcelona SC)
- Number: 9

Youth career
- Tolita Sport
- Barcelona (Esmeraldas)
- 2017–2022: Barcelona SC

Senior career*
Years	Team	Apps	(Gls)
2022–	Barcelona SC	21	(4)
2025	→ Inter Miami (loan)	6	(1)
2026	→ Istra 1961 (loan)	6	(0)
2026–	→ Nacional (loan)	1	(0)

International career^{‡}
2023	Ecuador U17	9	(4)
2024–	Ecuador	2	(0)
- * Club domestic league appearances and goals as of 1 June 2026 ‡ National team caps and goals as of 24 March 2024

Allen Aldair Obando Ayoví (born 13 June 2006) is an Ecuadorian professional footballer who plays as a forward for Primeira Liga club Nacional, on loan from Liga Pro Ecuador Serie A club Barcelona SC, and the Ecuador national team.

== Early life ==
Obando was born in Quito to parents Carlos and Monserrat, who were living in the city at the time.

== Club career ==
=== Early career ===
While living in the La Victoria neighbourhood, close to Esmeraldas, Obando began playing football with Tolita Sport at the age of five. Having scored against Barcelona de Esmeraldas, an affiliated of professional side Barcelona de Guayaquil, he began training with the side, and was eventually offered an ultimately unsuccessful trial with Independiente del Valle at the age of nine.

=== Barcelona SC ===
The following year, he was invited to represent Barcelona at a youth tournament in the Santo Domingo de los Tsáchilas Province, before helping the youth team win a tournament in Guayaquil, scoring in the final. Due to these performances, Obando was invited by then-vice-president Carlos Alfaro Moreno to move to Guayaquil and join the club permanently, which he did at the age of ten. He progressed well through the club's academy, establishing himself as a prolific goal-scorer, with then-manager Jorge Célico later stating that he was a player with "an impressive, promising future".

Obando made his professional debut on 8 August 2022; with the score at 4–1 in an Ecuadorian Serie A match against Mushuc Runa, he was brought on as a substitute for Emmanuel Martínez with ten minutes remaining. Just seven minutes after entering the field, he stepped up to take a penalty kick awarded to Barcelona, but his shot was saved by goalkeeper Adonnis Pabón.

The following year, it was reported that he was being scouted by the City Football Group, owners of English Premier League side Manchester City, among others. Later in the same year, journalist César Luis Merlo claimed that the group had launched a formal bid for Obando. Despite the interest, he remained with Barcelona, and made his next appearance for the club in a 1–1 draw with Independiente del Valle on 19 August, with Obando stating after the match that, despite "all the talk about [his] value, [he was] taking it easy and continuing to work because [he is] in Barcelona."

In late September 2023, Carlos Alfaro Moreno, now president of Barcelona, stated that proposals had been exchanged between the club and an unnamed contact in European football. It was reported that the City Football Group were still interested in Obando, while German Bundesliga side Borussia Dortmund were now also being touted as suitors. On 25 September, he scored his first goal for the club, the equaliser in a 2–1 comeback win against Cuenca. The following month, he was named by English newspaper The Guardian as one of the best players born in 2006 worldwide.

On 25 March 2025 Obando signed for Major League Soccer club Inter Miami on loan with a purchase option. He would make his debut coming on as a substitute in a 1–1 draw against Toronto.

=== NK Istra 1961 ===
On 17 February 2026, Obando was loaned to Croatian Football League club NK Istra 1961 for the rest of the season.

=== C.D. Nacional ===
On 17 August 2026, Obando was loaned out to Primeira Liga club C.D. Nacional.

== International career ==
Obando has represented Ecuador at under-17 level.

Obando made his debut for the senior Ecuador national team on 22 March 2024 in a friendly against Guatemala.

== Career statistics ==
=== Club ===
As of 22 October 2023.

Appearances and goals by club, season and competition
Club	Season	League			Cup		Continental		Other		Total	
Club	Season	Division	Apps	Goals	Apps	Goals	Apps	Goals	Apps	Goals	Apps	Goals
Barcelona de Guayaquil	2022	Ecuadorian Serie A	2	0	0	0	0	0	0	0	2	0
Barcelona de Guayaquil	2023	Ecuadorian Serie A	6	1	0	0	0	0	0	0	6	1
Career total			8	1	0	0	0	0	0	0	8	1

=== International ===
As of match played 24 March 2024

Appearances and goals by national team and year
National team	Year	Apps	Goals
Ecuador	2024	2	0
Total		2	0

== Honors ==
Inter Miami

- MLS Cup: 2025
