= Daouda Doumbia =

Malien footballer (born 2002)

Personal information
- Date of birth: 1 January 2002 (age 24)
- Place of birth: Bamako, Mali
- Height: 1.88 m (6 ft 2 in)
- Position: Midfielder

Team information
- Current team: Istra 1961
- Number: 88

Youth career
- –2022: Afrique Football Élite

Senior career*
Years	Team	Apps	(Gls)
2022	San Ignacio	0	(0)
2022–2025	Alavés B	80	(3)
2025–2026	Feirense	28	(0)
2026–	Istra 1961	7	(0)
- * Club domestic league appearances and goals as of 13 September 2026

Daouda Doumbia (born 1 January 2002) is a Malian professional footballer who plays as a midfielder for Croatian Football League club Istra 1961.

== Club career ==
Doumbia joined Alavés on January 1, 2022. On 8 August 2024, he extended his contract with Alavés until 2028.

Doumbia joined Feirense on 2 August 2025.

On 17 July 2026, Doumbia signed a two-year contract with Istra 1961 in Croatia.
