= Dukan Ahmeti =

Croatian footballer (born 2007)

Personal information
- Date of birth: 26 October 2007 (age 19)
- Place of birth: Pula, Croatia
- Height: 5 ft 11 in (1.80 m)
- Position: Attacking midfielder

Team information
- Current team: Istra 1961
- Number: 20

Youth career
- 2014–2025: Istra 1961

Senior career*
Years	Team	Apps	(Gls)
2024–	Istra 1961	23	(3)
2024–2025	→ Uljanik Pula (loan)	37	(1)

International career^{‡}
2023–2024	Croatia U17	2	(0)
2024–2025	Croatia U18	8	(2)
2025–	Croatia U19	2	(0)
- * Club domestic league appearances and goals as of 11 October 2026 ‡ National team caps and goals as of 11 October 2026

Dukan Ahmeti (born 26 October 2007) is a Croatian professional footballer who plays as an attacking midfielder for Istra 1961.

== Club career ==
Ahmeti was born in Pula, Croatia, to parents of Albanian descent originally from the cities of Tetovo and Pirok in North Macedonia. As a member of Istra's U19 and Croatia's U17 squad, Ahmeti attracted interest from Milan. On 4 February 2024, Ahmeti made his professional debut against Rijeka at the age of 16. Ahmeti spent the 2024–25 season and the first half of the 2025–26 season at NK Uljanik Pula, making 37 appearances and scoring one goal.

== International career ==
Ahmeti played for the Croatia U17 at the 2024 UEFA European Under-17 Championship.
