= Vinko Rozić =

Bosnian footballer (born 2003)

Personal information
- Date of birth: 1 August 2003 (age 23)
- Place of birth: Livno, Bosnia and Herzegovina
- Height: 5 ft 11 in (1.80 m)
- Position: Winger

Team information
- Current team: Istra 1961
- Number: 24

Youth career
- Hajduk Split
- 2017–2021: Dinamo Zagreb

Senior career*
Years	Team	Apps	(Gls)
2021–2023	Dinamo Zagreb II	11	(0)
2022	→ Široki Brijeg (loan)	19	(1)
2023	→ Posušje (loan)	13	(1)
2023–2025	Posušje	41	(6)
2025–	Istra 1961	44	(10)

International career^{‡}
2019–2020	Croatia U17	5	(1)
2021	Croatia U19	3	(1)
2024	Bosnia and Herzegovina U21	3	(0)
- * Club domestic league appearances and goals as of 1 June 2025 ‡ National team caps and goals as of 15 October 2024

Vinko Rozić (pronounced [ʋîːnko rôːzitɕ]; born 1 August 2003) is a Bosnian professional footballer who plays as a winger for Croatian Football League club Istra 1961.

Rozić started his professional career at Dinamo Zagreb, playing in its reserve team, who loaned him to Široki Brijeg in 2022 and to Posušje in 2023, with whom he signed permanently later that year. In 2025, he moved to Istra 1961.

== Club career ==
=== Early career ===
Rozić started playing football at Croatian club Hajduk Split, before joining Dinamo Zagreb's youth academy in 2017. He made his professional debut playing for Dinamo Zagreb's reserve squad against Bijelo Brdo on 14 August 2021 at the age of 18. In January 2022, he was loaned to Široki Brijeg until the end of the season. On 24 July, he scored his first professional goal in a triumph over Sloboda Tuzla.

In January 2023, he was sent on a six-month loan to Posušje, with an option to make the transfer permanent, which was activated in September.

In January 2025, Rozić signed with Istra 1961.

== Career statistics ==
=== Club ===
As of match played 11 May 2025

Appearances and goals by club, season and competition
Club	Season	League			National cup (Note: Includes Bosnian Cup, Croatian Cup)		Continental		Total	
Club	Season	Division	Apps	Goals	Apps	Goals	Apps	Goals	Apps	Goals
Dinamo Zagreb II	2021–22	Croatian First League	11	0	–		–		11	0
Široki Brijeg (loan)	2021–22	Bosnian Premier League	5	0	0	0	–		5	0
Široki Brijeg (loan)	2022–23	Bosnian Premier League	14	1	1	0	–		15	1
Široki Brijeg (loan)	Total		19	1	1	0	–		20	1
Posušje (loan)	2022–23	Bosnian Premier League	13	1	1	0	–		14	1
Posušje	2023–24	Bosnian Premier League	25	2	4	0	–		29	2
Posušje	2024–25	Bosnian Premier League	16	4	0	0	–		16	4
Posušje	Total		54	7	5	0	–		59	7
Istra 1961	2024–25	Croatian Football League	15	5	2	0	–		17	5
Career total			99	13	8	0	–		107	13
