= Samuli Miettinen (footballer) =

Finnish footballer (born 2004)

Personal information
- Full name: Samuli Rasmus Miettinen
- Date of birth: 16 June 2004 (age 22)
- Place of birth: Kuopio, Finland
- Height: 1.88 m (6 ft 2 in)
- Position: Centre back

Team information
- Current team: Istra 1961

Youth career
- –2021: KuPS

Senior career*
Years	Team	Apps	(Gls)
2020–2021	KuFu-98	21	(2)
2022–2023	KuPS II	14	(1)
2022–2025	KuPS	47	(1)
2022–2023	→ Sampdoria (loan)	0	(0)
2026–	Istra 1961	11	(0)

International career^{‡}
2021–2022	Finland U18	5	(0)
2022	Finland U19	1	(0)
2024–	Finland U21	6	(0)
2026–	Finland	5	(0)
- * Club domestic league appearances and goals as of 1 June 2026 ‡ National team caps and goals as of 7 October 2026

Samuli Rasmus Miettinen (born 16 June 2004) is a Finnish professional football player who plays as a centre back for Croatian Football League side Ista 1961 and the Finland national football team.

== Club career ==
Miettinen played in the youth sector of Kuopion Palloseura. He debuted in Veikkausliiga with KuPS first team in the 2022 season.

He was loaned out to Italian club Sampdoria for the 2022–23 season, and was assigned to the club's academy team in Primavera. After his loan deal ended, he returned to KuPS. On 16 November 2023, he extended his contract with the club until the end of 2025.

During the 2024 season, Miettinen established himself in Veikkausliiga, and was an integral part of KuPS's defense with Ibrahim Cissé when KuPS won the Finnish championship title. They also completed the club's first-ever double by winning the 2024 Finnish Cup.

On 5 April 2025, in a season opening match against Inter Turku, Miettinen scored his first Veikkausliiga goal, helping KuPS to 1–1 away draw.

== Career statistics ==
As of 18 May 2026

Appearances and goals by club, season and competition
Club	Season	League			National cup (Note: Includes Suomen Cup)		League cup		Europe		Total	
Club	Season	Division	Apps	Goals	Apps	Goals	Apps	Goals	Apps	Goals	Apps	Goals
KuFu-98	2020	Kakkonen	1	0	–		–		–		1	0
KuFu-98	2021	Kakkonen	20	2	–		–		–		20	2
KuFu-98	Total		21	2	0	0	0	0	0	0	21	2
KuPS Akatemia	2022	Kakkonen	13	1	–		–		–		13	1
KuPS Akatemia	2023	Kakkonen	1	0	–		–		–		1	0
KuPS Akatemia	Total		14	1	0	0	0	0	0	0	14	1
KuPS	2022	Veikkausliiga	2	0	1	0	4	0	0	0	7	0
KuPS	2023	Veikkausliiga	1	0	0	0	0	0	0	0	1	0
KuPS	2024	Veikkausliiga	24	0	4	1	7	0	4 (Note: Appearances UEFA Conference League)	0	39	1
KuPS	2025	Veikkausliiga	20	1	2	0	3	1	10 (Note: Four appearances in UEFA Champions League, two appearances in UEFA Europa League and four appearances in UEFA Conference League)	0	35	2
KuPS	Total		47	1	7	1	14	1	14	0	82	3
Ista 1961	2025–26	HNL	10	0	–		–		–		10	0
Career total			92	4	7	1	14	1	14	0	127	6

=== International ===
As of match played 6 October 2026

National team	Year	Competitive		Friendly		Total	
National team	Year	Apps	Goals	Apps	Goals	Apps	Goals
Finland	2026	3 (Note: Appearances in the 2026–27 UEFA Nations League C.)	0	2 (Note: Includes one appearance in the 2026 FIFA Series.)	0	5	0
Total		3	0	2	0	5	0

== Honours ==
KuPS

- Veikkausliiga: 2024, 2025
- Veikkausliiga runner-up: 2022, 2023
- Finnish Cup: 2022, 2024
- Finnish Cup runner-up: 2025
- Finnish League Cup runner-up: 2024

Finland

- FIFA Series: 2026
