= Emil Frederiksen =

Danish footballer (born 2000)

Personal information
- Date of birth: 5 September 2000 (age 26)
- Place of birth: Viborg, Denmark
- Height: 1.75 m (5 ft 9 in)
- Position: Right winger

Team information
- Current team: Istra 1961
- Number: 22

Youth career
- Viborg FF

Senior career*
Years	Team	Apps	(Gls)
2018–2020	SC Heerenveen	0	(0)
2020	→ SønderjyskE (loan)	11	(0)
2020–2023	SønderjyskE	76	(20)
2023–2025	Rosenborg	23	(3)
2024–2025	→ Horsens (loan)	24	(10)
2025–	Istra 1961	41	(11)
- * Club domestic league appearances and goals as of 22 September 2026

Emil Frederiksen (born 5 September 2000) is a Danish professional footballer who plays as a right winger for Croatian Football League club Istra 1961. He previously played for Danish 1st Division club SønderjyskE and Horsens.

== Career statistics ==
=== Club ===
As of 22 September 2026

Appearances and goals by club, season and competition
Club	Season	League			National Cup		Europe		Total	
Club	Season	Division	Apps	Goals	Apps	Goals	Apps	Goals	Apps	Goals
SønderjyskE (loan)	2019–20	Danish Superliga	11	0	3	1	—		14	1
SønderjyskE	2020–21	Danish Superliga	25	1	6	1	1	0	32	2
SønderjyskE	2021–22	Danish Superliga	22	3	7	0	—		29	3
SønderjyskE	2022–23	Danish 1st Division	29	16	5	1	—		34	17
SønderjyskE	Total		87	20	21	3	1	0	109	23
Rosenborg	2023	Eliteserien	12	2	0	0	2	1	14	3
Rosenborg	2024	Eliteserien	11	1	2	0	—		13	1
Rosenborg	Total		23	3	2	0	2	1	27	4
Horsens (loan)	2024–25	Danish 1st Division	24	10	1	0	—		25	10
Istra 1961	2025–26	Croatian Football League	33	4	1	0	—		34	4
Istra 1961	2026–27	Croatian Football League	8	7	0	0	—		8	7
Istra 1961	Total		41	11	1	0	—		42	11
Career total			175	44	25	3	3	1	203	48

== Honours ==
SønderjyskE

- Danish Cup: 2019–20

Individual

- Danish 1st Division Player of the Season: 2022–23
