= Mohamed Nasraoui =

Tunisian footballer (born 2002)

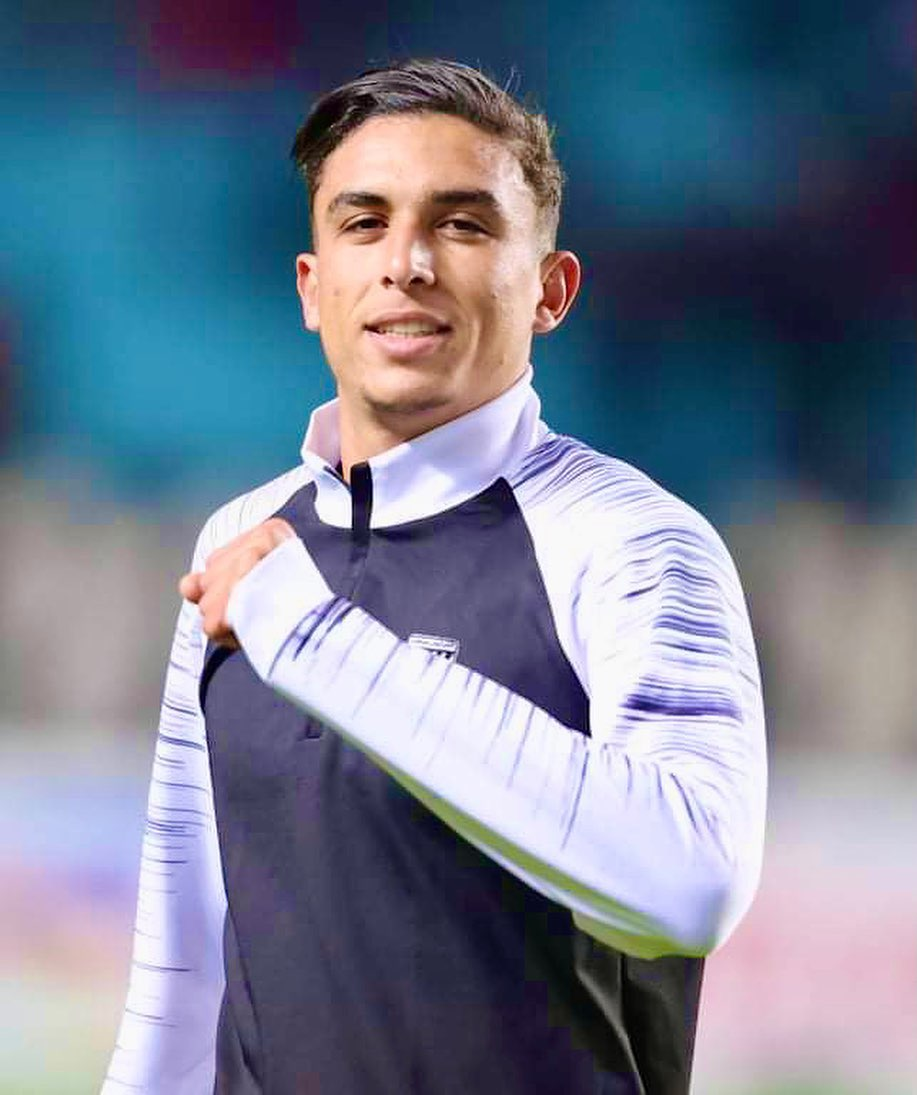
- Nasraoui in 2022

Personal information
- Date of birth: 18 August 2002 (age 24)
- Place of birth: Sfax, Tunisia
- Height: 1.86 m (6 ft 1 in)
- Position: Central defender

Team information
- Current team: Istra 1961
- Number: 3

Senior career*
Years	Team	Apps	(Gls)
2021–2025	CS Sfaxien	90	(2)
2025–	Istra 1961	26	(0)

International career^{‡}
2021	Tunisia U20	1	(0)
2026–	Tunisia	1	(0)
- * Club domestic league appearances and goals as of 10 October 2026 ‡ National team caps and goals as of 28 September 2026

Mohamed Nasraoui (born 18 August 2002; Arabic: مُحَمَّد النَّصْرَاوِيّ) is a Tunisian professional footballer who plays as a central defender for Croatian Football League club Istra 1961 and the Tunisia national team.

== International career ==
On 28 September 2026, Nasraoui made his debut for the Tunisia national team in an AFCON qualifier against Botswana.

== Honours ==
CS Sfaxien

- Tunisian Cup (1): 2021–22
