= Dušan Vuković =

Montenegrin footballer (born 2002)

Personal information
- Date of birth: 6 August 2002 (age 24)
- Place of birth: Nikšić, FR Yugoslavia
- Height: 1.88 m (6 ft 2 in)
- Position: Forward

Team information
- Current team: Lokomotiva
- Number: 30

Youth career
- –2020: Budućnost

Senior career*
Years	Team	Apps	(Gls)
2020–2025	Sutjeska Nikšić	88	(13)
2021	→ Bokelj (loan)	0	(0)
2021–2022	→ OFK Igalo (loan)	7	(2)
2024	→ Lokomotiva (loan)	13	(1)
2025–	Lokomotiva	45	(7)

International career^{‡}
2021	Montenegro U19	4	(0)
2022–2024	Montenegro U21	13	(2)
2026–	Montenegro	5	(0)
- * Club domestic league appearances and goals as of 13 September 2026 ‡ National team caps and goals as of 15 November 2026

Dušan Vuković (Montenegrin: Душан Вуковић; born 6 August 2002) is a Montenegrin professional footballer who plays as a forward for Lokomotiva and the Montenegro national team.

== Club career ==
Dušan joined Lokomotiva on loan in September 2024.
