= Antonio Maurić =

Croatian footballer

Personal information
- Date of birth: 4 November 2003 (age 23)
- Place of birth: Pula, Croatia
- Height: 1.87 m (6 ft 2 in)
- Position: Midfielder

Team information
- Current team: Istra 1961
- Number: 8

Youth career
- 2013–2015: Rudar Labin
- 2015–2018: Istra 1961
- 2018–2019: Rudar Labin
- 2019–2023: Istra 1961

Senior career*
| Years | Team | Apps | (Gls) |
| 2022– | Istra 1961 | 82 | (3) |

International career^{‡}
| 2023–2024 | Croatia U21 | 2 | (0) |
- * Club domestic league appearances and goals as of 1 June 2026 ‡ National team caps and goals as of 3 June 2025

Antonio Maurić (born 4 November 2003) is a Croatian professional footballer who plays as a midfielder for Istra 1961.

== Club career ==
On 6 March 2022, Antonio made his debut for istra against Hajduk Split coming in as a substitute for Facundo Cáseres.

== Personal life ==
Born in Pula, Antonio is from the village of Barban in Istra.
