= Filip Brekalo (footballer, born 2002) =

Croatian footballer

Personal information
- Date of birth: 9 June 2002 (age 24)
- Place of birth: Mostar, Bosnia and Herzegovina
- Position: Left-back

Team information
- Current team: GOŠK Gabela
- Number: 17

Youth career
- –2021: Široki Brijeg

Senior career*
Years	Team	Apps	(Gls)
2019–2020	Neretvanac Opuzen	11	(2)
2020–2022	Široki Brijeg	33	(1)
2022–2023	Zrinjski Mostar	0	(0)
2024	Igman Konjic	8	(0)
2024–	GOŠK Gabela	0	(0)

International career
2019	Croatia U17	3	(0)
2019	Croatia U18	2	(0)
- * Club domestic league appearances and goals as of 19 August 2024

Filip Brekalo (born 9 June 2002) is a professional footballer who plays as a left-back for Bosnian Premier League side GOŠK Gabela. Born in Bosnia and Herzegovina, he represented Croatia at youth international level.

== International career ==
In 2019, Brekalo was capped for Croatia at the under-17 and under-18 levels.
