= Gustavo Albarracín =

Argentine footballer (born 2006)

Personal information
- Full name: Gustavo Hidalgo Albarracín
- Date of birth: 28 April 2006 (age 20)
- Place of birth: Las Varillas, Córdoba Province, Argentina
- Height: 1.78 m (5 ft 10 in)
- Position: Midfielder

Team information
- Current team: Istra 1961 (on loan from Alavés)
- Number: 25

Youth career
- Almafuerte
- Santos
- América de Villa María
- 2016–2014: Talleres

Senior career*
Years	Team	Apps	(Gls)
2024–2025	Talleres	8	(1)
2025–	Alavés	0	(0)
2025	→ Huesca (loan)	0	(0)
2026–	→ Istra 1961 (loan)	4	(0)

International career
2022–2023	Argentina U17	22	(0)
- * Club domestic league appearances and goals as of 18:03, 1 June 2026 (UTC)

Gustavo Hidalgo Albarracín (born 28 April 2006) is an Argentine footballer currently playing as a midfielder for Croatian club NK Istra 1961, on loan from Spanish club Deportivo Alavés.

== Club career ==
=== Talleres ===
Born in Las Varillas, Córdoba Province, Albarracín started his football career in the local youth teams of Santos and América de Villa María. Since 2016, he played for Talleres de Córdoba's football academy. In June 2023, he signed his first professional contract with Talleres de Córdoba.

On 2 June 2024, Albarracín made his professional debut in a Primera División match against Central Córdoba, scoring a goal.

=== Alavés ===
On 13 August 2025, La Liga side Deportivo Alavés announced the signing of Albarracín on a four-year contract.

==== Loan to Huesca ====
On 29 August 2025, Albarracín was loaned to Segunda División side SD Huesca, for one year. The following 2 February, after just two cup matches, his loan was cut short.

== International career ==
Albarracín has represented Argentina at under-17 level. In 2023, he participated in the South American U-17 Championship and the FIFA U-17 World Cup.
