= Charles Agada =

Nigerian association football player (born 2006)

Personal information
- Full name: Charles Adah Agada
- Date of birth: 3 September 2006 (age 20)
- Position: Forward

Team information
- Current team: HNK Orijent (on loan from Istra 1961)
- Number: 17

Youth career
- –2024: Mavlon FC

Senior career*
Years	Team	Apps	(Gls)
2025–	Istra 1961	14	(1)

International career
2023	Nigeria U17		
2024–	Nigeria U20		
- * Club domestic league appearances and goals as of 00:15 (UTC) 27 May 2026

Charles Adah Agada (born 3 September 2006) is a Nigerian professional footballer who plays as a forward for Prva NL club HNK Orijent, on loan from Istra 1961. He is a Nigeria youth international.

== Club career ==
He scored eight goals in five games, including a hat-truck against the academy squad of Italian Serie A club Fiorentina, as he captained Nigerian club Mavlon FC to the semi finals of the Viareggio youth tournament in Italy in February 2024. In October 2024, he was linked to a move to EFL Championship side Queens Park Rangers in England.

In February 2025, he joined Croatian side Istra 1961 on a four-year contract. On 3 August 2926, he was sent on loan to HNK Orijent.

== International career ==
He represented Nigeria U17 at the 2023 U-17 Africa Cup of Nations. The following year he played for Nigeria U20. He played for Nigeria at the delayed 2023 African Games in Ghana in March 2024. He played for Nigeria U20 at the 2025 FIFA U-20 World Cup.

== Personal life ==
He grew up the son of farmers in Otukpo, Benue State. He attended school at Palmvill College in Lagos after being scouted by Mavlon FC.
