= Javier Cabello =

Spanish football manager

Personal information
- Full name: Javier Antonio Cabello Rubio
- Date of birth: 20 July 1974 (age 52)
- Place of birth: Valencia, Spain

Team information
- Current team: Istra 1961 (manager)

Managerial career
- Years: Team
- 2000–2004: Cieza
- 2010–2011: Cieza
- 2011–2012: Castellón
- 2014–2015: Cultural Leonesa
- 2017–2021: Alavés (assistant)
- 2017: Alavés (interim)
- 2017: Alavés (interim)
- 2021–2024: FC Dallas (assistant)
- 2025: Eldense
- 2026–: Istra 1961

Javier Antonio Cabello Rubio (born 20 July 1974) is a Spanish football manager. As of June 2026, Cabello is the manager of Croatian Football League club Istra 1961.

== Career ==
Born in Valencia, Cabello started his career with Villarreal CF in 1999, working in their youth setup as a coordinator. He was subsequently appointed manager of CD Cieza in the following year, and remained in charge for four seasons.

In 2004 Cabello returned to Villarreal, again working in the youth categories; in 2006, he started working as a scout for the first team. In 2008, he was named director of Valencia CF's youth setup.

On 18 July 2010, Cabello returned to managerial duties, being again appointed at the helm of Cieza. In August of the following year, he was named manager of CD Castellón.

Cabello left Castellón in January 2012, following the departure of owner Fernando Miralles. He remained without a club until June 2014, as he was appointed Cultural y Deportiva Leonesa manager.

On 4 July 2015, Cabello was named general manager at Elche CF, but left his post nearly a month later. In June 2017, he was one of the four assistant managers who joined Luis Zubeldía's staff at Deportivo Alavés.

On 17 September 2017, after Zubeldía's dismissal, Cabello was named interim of the Basque side. His first professional match occurred three days later, a 0–1 away loss against Deportivo de La Coruña.

In December 2021, Cabello moved to the United States and joined FC Dallas of Major League Soccer as an assistant to Nico Estévez. On 11 June 2024, the club announced his departure.

On 28 June 2025, Cabello returned to managerial duties after being named in charge of Primera Federación side CD Eldense. On 19 October, however, he was sacked.

As of June 2026, ahead of the 2026–2027 season, Cabello was appointed the manager of Croatian Football League club Istra 1961.

== Managerial statistics ==
As of 22 November 2026

Managerial record by team and tenure
Team	Nat	From	To	Record								Ref
Team	Nat	From	To	G	W	D	L	GF	GA	GD	Win %	Ref
Cieza	(Spain)	1 July 2000	30 June 2004	150	59	31	60	232	228	+4	39.33	
Cieza	(Spain)	18 July 2010	30 June 2011	38	25	5	8	74	29	+45	65.79	
Castellón	(Spain)	13 August 2011	16 January 2012	23	11	5	7	29	23	+6	47.83	—
Cultural Leonesa	(Spain)	18 June 2014	11 July 2015	38	15	14	9	52	43	+9	39.47	
Alavés (interim)	(Spain)	18 September 2017	23 September 2017	2	0	0	2	1	3	−2	0.00	
Alavés (interim)	(Spain)	27 November 2017	1 December 2017	1	1	0	0	3	0	+3	100.00	
Eldense	(Spain)	28 June 2025	19 October 2025	8	2	4	2	7	9	−2	25.00	
Istra 1961	(Croatia)	9 June 2026		16	7	4	5	34	22	+12	43.75	
Total				276	120	63	93	432	357	+75	43.48	—
