= Israel Isaac Ayuma =

Nigerian midfielder (born 2005)

Personal information
- Date of birth: 8 August 2005 (age 21)
- Place of birth: Orhuwhorun, Nigeria
- Height: 1.85 m (6 ft 1 in)
- Position: Midfielder

Team information
- Current team: Marítimo (on loan from Istra 1961)
- Number: 66

Youth career
- –2023: Mavlon FC
- 2023–2024: Istra 1961

Senior career*
Years	Team	Apps	(Gls)
2025–	Istra 1961	17	(1)
2026–	→ Marítimo (loan)	6	(1)

International career^{‡}
2025–	Nigeria U20	9	(0)
- * Club domestic league appearances and goals as of 1 November 2026 ‡ National team caps and goals as of 8 October 2025

Israel Isaac Ayuma (born 8 August 2005) is a Nigerian professional footballer who plays as a midfielder for Primeira Liga club Marítimo, on loan from Croatian Football League club Istra 1961.

== Club career ==
On 10 August 2023, Ayuma signed a contract with HNL club Istra 1961 until 2026. He made his debut on 25 January 2025 against Dinamo Zagreb. On 17 June 2025, he extended his contract with Istra 1961 until 2028.

On 2 August 2026, Ayuma moved on loan to Marítimo in Portugal.

== International career ==
Ayuma was first called up to the Nigeria U20 for the 2025 U-20 Africa Cup of Nations on 17 April 2025. He made his international debut for Nigeria U20 on 4 May 2025 in a 2025 U-20 Africa Cup of Nations match against Morocco U20.
