= Hamza Jaganjac =

Bosnian footballer (born 2004)

Personal information
- Date of birth: 27 February 2004 (age 22)
- Place of birth: Sarajevo, Bosnia and Herzegovina
- Height: 1.92 m (6 ft 4 in)
- Position: Forward

Team information
- Current team: Istra 1961

Youth career
- –2022: Željezničar
- 2023: Adana Demirspor

Senior career*
Years	Team	Apps	(Gls)
2021–2022	Željezničar	1	(0)
2023–2024	Adana Demirspor	1	(0)
2024	→ Istra 1961 (loan)	5	(1)
2024–	Istra 1961	10	(0)
2025–2026	→ Željezničar (loan)	25	(4)

International career
2021	Bosnia and Herzegovina U18	3	(0)
2021–2022	Bosnia and Herzegovina U19	9	(0)
2024–2026	Bosnia and Herzegovina U21	7	(1)
- * Club domestic league appearances and goals as of 21 May 2026

Hamza Jaganjac (born 27 February 2004) is a Bosnian professional footballer who plays as a forward for Croatian Football League club Istra 1961 and the Bosnia and Herzegovina U21 national team.

== Club career ==
=== Adana Demirspor ===
In March 2023, Jaganjac signed a contract with Turkish club Adana Demirspor. He made his debut in a league match against Ankaragücü on 7 June 2023.

=== Istra 1961 ===
In February 2024, Jaganjac was loaned out to Istra 1961 in Croatia, with an option to buy. On 2 July 2024, he signed a three-year contract with the club.

==== Loan to Željezničar ====
In June 2025, Jaganjac joined hometown club Željezničar on loan for the duration of the 2025–26 season. On 15 September 2025, he scored the winning goal in a 3–2 comeback win over Borac Banja Luka after being 2–0 down at half-time.

== Career statistics ==
=== Club ===
As of match played 21 May 2026

Appearances and goals by club, season and competition
Club	Season	League			National cup (Note: Includes Bosnian Cup, Croatian Cup)		Continental		Total	
Club	Season	League	Apps	Goals	Apps	Goals	Apps	Goals	Apps	Goals
Željezničar	2021–22	Bosnian Premier League	1	0	1	1	—		2	1
Adana Demirspor	2022–23	Süper Lig	1	0	0	0	—		1	0
Adana Demirspor	2023–24	Süper Lig	0	0	0	0	—		0	0
Adana Demirspor	Total		1	0	0	0	—		1	0
Istra 1961 (loan)	2023–24	Croatian Football League	5	1	—		—		5	1
Istra 1961	2024–25	Croatian Football League	10	0	1	0	—		11	0
Istra 1961	Total		15	1	1	0	—		16	1
Željezničar (loan)	2025–26	Bosnian Premier League	25	4	3	0	2	0	30	4
Career total			42	5	5	1	2	0	49	6
