= NK Istra 1961 =

Association football club in Croatia

Istra 1961
- Full name: Nogometni klub Istra 1961 (Istra 1961 Football Club)
- Nicknames: Verudeži; Zeleno-žuti (The Green-Yellows)
- Short name: Istra, IST
- Founded: 1948; 78 years ago
- Ground: Stadion Aldo Drosina
- Capacity: 10,000
- Owner: Baskonia-Alavés Group
- President: Branko Devide Vincenti
- Head coach: Javier Cabello
- League: Croatian Football League
- 2025–26: Croatian Football League, 6th of 10
- Website: nkistra.com
Home colours	Away colours

Nogometni klub Istra 1961 (English: Istra 1961 Football Club), commonly referred to as Istra 1961, is a Croatian professional football club based in Pula. They compete in the Croatian Football League (HNL), the top tier of Croatian football.

It is commonly believed that Istra 1961 was founded in 1961 by merging two clubs from Pula, NK Uljanik and NK Pula, forming NK Istra. However, NK Istra is not the same club as NK Istra 1961. NK Istra 1961, then named NK Uljanik, was founded in 1964. NK Istra were competing in Prva HNL since the first season, but were relegated in the 1996–97 season to Druga HNL. They were promoted back to Prva HNL in the 1998–99 season, but they were relegated again in the next season, never coming back to Prva HNL. Meanwhile, NK Uljanik was in the shadow of NK Istra, but they were promoted to Prva HNL in the 2003–04 season and are the best club in Pula since then. NK Istra, now under the name NK Istra Pula, is competing in Prva ŽNL, the fifth football level in Croatia. The greatest club success was in the 2002–03 season when they finished runners-up in the Croatian Cup, losing to Hajduk Split 5–0 on aggregate.

In the 2004–05 season, the club changed its name into NK Pula 1856, because 1856 was the year that the Austro-Hungarian Empire made Pula the port of its arsenal and the shipyard Uljanik was opened. Also in the same year, it competed in the Prva HNL for the first time. In 2005, it was renamed again to NK Pula Staro Češko due to a sponsorship contract with the brewery Daruvarska pivovara (Staro Češko is a beer brand). Just one year later, the name was once again changed, this time to NK Pula. Again, just a year later in the middle of 2007, the name was changed for the fifth time in as many years, to NK Istra 1961. The change of name came after an ultimatum from the local fans Demoni who said the club would have their support only if the club changed its name and club colours to the traditional city colours (yellow and green). After renaming club was sold in 2011 to a Russian who achieved promotion for the club and sold it in 2015. Istra 1961 was bought by an American investment group in 2015. The Istra 1961's academy system consistently competes for top spots in the rankings.

Istra 1961 has a rich fan history. The group of die hard fans are referred to as the Demoni, and are known for their explosive chants and celebrations as well as their extreme pride for the club. In summer 2018, club's ownership changed once again, this time to Basque consortium Baskonia - Alavés Group which acquired the majority share package and became sole owner of Istra 1961.

Its crest features the city's Roman arena in Pula, as well as the old team crest. Istra 1961 play their home matches at the recently renovated Stadion Aldo Drosina, which has a capacity of approximately 10,000 spectators.

== History ==
The first incarnation of NK Istra was NK Uljanik, a club founded by the Pula shipyard Uljanik in 1948. The first club success was in 1959–60 when they qualified to the Yugoslav Second League. In 1961 NK Uljanik merged with NK Pula to form NK Istra 1961. The club stopped functioning shortly thereafter, but was restarted by Silvano Faraguna and Ivan Čekić in 1964, when they played in the Pula county league.

After the founding of an independent Croatia, the club played in the Druga HNL between 1993 and 1998, when they dropped down to Treća HNL. In 2001 they became the champions of Treća HNL and returned to Druga HNL.

Two years later in the 2002–03 season, under the leadership of manager Elvis Scoria, Istra played in the final of the Croatian Cup, losing to Hajduk Split. It is the only time, in the history of Croatian football, that a Druga HNL league club played in the cup final.

In season 2003–04 the club was managed by Igor Pamić. He managed to win the Druga HNL South, and beat Međimurje (0–2, 2–0) in the play-offs, after penalties.

The club played first league football for the first time in their history in the 2004–05 season, and managed their first Prva HNL win against Osijek in the fourth gameweek. The club lost only one game at home, but failed to win a single away game. They finished tenth, and won the play-offs to remain in the first league.

In 2005–06 the club president Gianni Rossando was replaced by Orsat Zovko. After a bad season start manager Pamić was replaced by Milivoj Bračun. The new manager managed a streak of good results. In the second half of the season Bračun resigned from the managerial position and was succeeded by Krunoslav Jurčić. The club finished in the season in seventh place.

During the summer manager Jurčić was fired, and replaced by Stjepan Deverić. Unstatisfied with the board, Deverić left before the start of the season. Branko Tucak became the new manager. After a string of bad results and clashed with the players, he was replaced by Krunoslav Jurčić. Bad results, compounded with a poor financial situation threatened the club with shutdown. The intervention of the Istria govurner and arrival of new sponsors managed to save the club, while the new president became Darko Jergović.

Pula finished the 2006–07 season in eleventh place, and lost the play-offs to Zadar (3–0, 2–3). They would then return to the Druga HNL.

Valdi Šumberac was appointed as the first manager. During this time, Istra was adopted by Demoni, who became the club's first group of ultras. At the end of August 2007 the club appointed Elvis Scoria as the new manager, while Šumberac remained as an assistant manager. Istra finished the season in the third place. However, the club finished the 2008–09 season as the champions of the Druga HNL and were promoted to the Prva HNL.

Istra 1961 achieved their best domestic success in the 2013–14 season, when they reached the semifinal of the Croatian Cup.

In June 2018, Istra was bought by the Baskonia-Alaves Group, who acquired the majority stake in the club, buying a total of 85% of the shares.

On 14 April 2021, Istra 1961 repeated the success of the 2013–14 season, qualifying for the final of the Croatian Cup, with a 3–2 home victory over Rijeka in the semifinal. They fell 6–3 to Dinamo Zagreb in the final.

On 26 November 2023, Istra 1961 broke record for number of people attending their home game at Stadion Aldo Drosina. The attendance were 8,606 people at the stadium that holds the capacity of 8,900.

== Recent seasons ==
Season	League									Cup	Top goalscorer	
Season	Division	P	W	D	L	F	A	Pts	Pos	Cup	Player	Goals
1992	3. HNL West B	14	4	8	2	21	9	16	3rd			
1992–93	3. HNL West	30	16	7	7	56	32	39	1st	R1		
1993–94	2. HNL South	30	7	7	16	21	43	21	14th			
1994–95	2. HNL West	36	12	8	16	40	48	44	13th			
1995–96	2. HNL West	34	18	8	8	58	36	62	5th			
1996–97	2. HNL West	30	19	6	5	65	21	63	3rd			
1997–98	2. HNL West	30	12	7	11	42	31	43	6th			
1998–99	3. HNL West	30	13	7	10	33	35	46	3rd			
1999–00	3. HNL West	30	17	6	7	56	30	57	3rd	R1		
2000–01	3. HNL West	30	17	11	2	73	26	62	1st ↑			
2001–02	2. HNL South	30	17	8	5	57	26	59	2nd	PR		
2002–03	2. HNL South	32	20	7	5	63	31	67	2nd	RU		
2003–04	2. HNL South	32	18	8	6	59	33	62	1st ↑	QF		
2004–05	1. HNL	32	7	14	11	28	31	35	10th	QF	Josip Jerneić, Vedran Stošić	6
2005–06	1. HNL	32	13	6	13	44	36	45	7th	R1	Stiven Rivić	12
2006–07	1. HNL	33	6	11	16	28	40	29	11th ↓	R1	Marko Radas, Almir Halilović	5
2007–08	2. HNL	30	17	7	6	42	14	58	3rd	R1	Saša Šest	8
2008–09	2. HNL	30	18	6	6	46	20	60	1st ↑	R1	Mohamed Kalilou Traoré	9
2009–10	1. HNL	30	9	8	13	31	40	35	11th	R2	Asim Šehić	15
2010–11	1. HNL	30	9	4	17	24	44	31	15th	QF	Siniša Linić	5
2011–12	1. HNL	30	11	9	10	35	33	42	9th	QF	Sandi Križman	7
2012–13	1. HNL	33	11	11	11	35	32	44	6th	R2	Goran Roce	11
2013–14	1. HNL	36	12	8	16	45	56	44	6th	SF	Dejan Radonjić	9
2014–15	1. HNL	36	7	14	15	36	59	35	9th	QF	Dejan Radonjić	16
2015–16	1. HNL	36	4	12	20	23	58	24	9th	R2	Stefan Nikolić	5
2016–17	1. HNL	36	10	9	17	33	49	39	6th	R2	Goran Roce	8
2017–18	1. HNL	36	6	9	21	28	60	27	9th	QF	Five players	3
2018–19	1. HNL	36	6	7	23	31	73	25	9th	R2	Ramón Mierez	9
2019–20	1. HNL	36	5	10	21	27	59	25	9th	R2	Mario Ćuže	7
2020–21	1. HNL	36	7	8	21	27	52	29	9th	RU	Matej Vuk	6
2021–22	1. HNL	36	7	10	19	42	67	31	9th	QF	Dion Drena Beljo	15
2022–23	HNL	36	11	13	12	36	38	46	5th	R2	Ante Erceg	11
2023–24	HNL	36	10	11	15	36	54	41	8th	R2	Ante Erceg	6
2024–25	HNL	36	11	15	10	39	42	48	6th	SF	Vinko Rozić	7
2025–26	HNL	36	12	7	17	39	50	43	6th	R2	Smail Prevljak	14

=== Key ===
1st	2nd	↑	↓
Champions	Runners-up	Promoted	Relegated

Top scorer shown in bold when he was also top scorer for the division.

- P = Played
- W = Games won
- D = Games drawn
- L = Games lost
- F = Goals for
- A = Goals against
- Pts = Points
- Pos = Final position
- 1. HNL = Prva HNL
- 2. HNL = Druga HNL
- 3. HNL = Treća HNL
- PR = Preliminary round
- R1 = Round 1
- R2 = Round 2
- QF = Quarter-finals
- SF = Semi-finals
- RU = Runners-up
- W = Winners

== Current squad ==
As of 9 September 2026

Note: Flags indicate national team as defined under FIFA eligibility rules; some limited exceptions apply. Players may hold more than one non-FIFA nationality.

No.	Pos.	Nation	Player
1	GK	CRO	Franko Kolić (captain)
3	DF	TUN	Mohamed Nasraoui
4	DF	CRO	Raul Kumar
5	MF	SWE	Demirel Hodžić
7	FW	BIH	Vinko Rozić
8	MF	CRO	Antonio Maurić
9	FW	BRA	Isaac (on loan from Hellas Verona)
11	MF	CRO	Silvio Goričan
13	DF	CRO	Niko Šepić
16	DF	FIN	Samuli Miettinen

No.	Pos.	Nation	Player
20	MF	CRO	Dukan Ahmeti
22	MF	DEN	Emil Frederiksen
23	FW	NZL	Stipe Ukich
25	MF	ARG	Gustavo Albarracín (on loan from Deportivo Alavés)
30	MF	CRO	Nik Škafar Žužić
40	GK	CRO	Jan Paus-Kunšt
44	DF	SLO	Rene Hrvatin
88	MF	MLI	Daouda Doumbia
94	FW	BIH	Hamza Jaganjac
97	DF	BIH	Advan Kadušić

=== Players with multiple nationalities ===
- (Bosnia and Herzegovina) (Croatia) Vinko Rozić
- (New Zealand) (Croatia) Stipe Ukich
- (Argentina) (Italy) Gustavo Albarracín
- (Brazil) (Croatia) Isaac
- (Sweden) (Bosnia and Herzegovina) Demirel Hodžić

=== Dual registration ===
Note: Flags indicate national team as defined under FIFA eligibility rules; some limited exceptions apply. Players may hold more than one non-FIFA nationality.

No.	Pos.	Nation	Player
15	FW	GAM	Ebou Sama (at Uljanik)
27	MF	CRO	Dominik Celija (at Uljanik)

No.	Pos.	Nation	Player
34	MF	CRO	Matija Kablar (at Uljanik)
66	DF	NGR	Mutari Momoh (at Uljanik)

=== Youth academy ===
Note: Flags indicate national team as defined under FIFA eligibility rules; some limited exceptions apply. Players may hold more than one non-FIFA nationality.

No.	Pos.	Nation	Player
12	GK	CRO	Roko Banovac
24	FW	CRO	Ivano Švraka
35	GK	CRO	Ivan Vasiljević
39	FW	CRO	Toni Brajković

No.	Pos.	Nation	Player
42	GK	CRO	Petar Nemet
50	MF	CRO	Roko Jenjić
70	FW	CRO	Teo Žiković
80	MF	CRO	Josip Sikirica

=== Other players under contract ===
Note: Flags indicate national team as defined under FIFA eligibility rules; some limited exceptions apply. Players may hold more than one non-FIFA nationality.

No.	Pos.	Nation	Player
—	MF	CRO	Josip Radošević

=== Out on loan ===
Note: Flags indicate national team as defined under FIFA eligibility rules; some limited exceptions apply. Players may hold more than one non-FIFA nationality.

No. / Pos. / Nation / Player; 77 / FW / NGR / Charles Adah Agada (at Orijent until 30 June 2027)	No. / Pos. / Nation / Player; — / MF / NGR / Israel Isaac Ayuma (at Marítimo until 30 June 2027)

== Personnel ==
Position	Staff
Head coach	(Spain) Javier Cabello
Assistant coach	(Spain) Felipe Ragel (Croatia) Slavko Blagojević
Goalkeeping coach	(Croatia) Lovro Skaramuca
Team manager	(Croatia) Marin Vidulin
Analyst	(Spain) Raul Gallego
Fitness coach	(Serbia) Nenad Njaradi (Croatia) Tihan Arapović
Rehabilitation coach	(Slovenia) Jan Czan Stermsek
Physiotherapist	(Croatia) Toni Radović (Croatia) Ljubomir Rnjak (Croatia) Stefan Marković

Last updated: 21 October 2026
Source: NK Istra 1961 official website

== Records ==
The following are lists of top players in terms of number of appearances and goals for Istra 1961 in the Croatian First Football League, as of 3 June 2023.

Bold denotes players still playing for Istra 1961.

Most appearances
#	Player	Career	Apps
1	**Slavko Blagojević**	2012–2014; 2020–present	145
1	Goran Roce	2009–2013; 2016–2017; 2018	144
3	Einar Galilea	2019–2023	131
4	Vanja Iveša	2004–2007; 2015–2017; 2018	130
5	Šime Gržan	2016–2018; 2019–2021	112
6	Mislav Anđelković	2006–2013	103
7	Nikola Prelčec	2009–2013; 2016–2018	95
8	Fausto Budicin	2006–2007; 2011–2014	89
8	Antonio Ivančić	2018–2022	89
10	Asim Šehić	2004–2006; 2009–2012	87

Top goalscorers
#	Player	Career	Goals
1	Asim Šehić	2004–2006; 2009–2012	30
2	Goran Roce	2009–2013; 2016–2017; 2018	29
3	Dejan Radonjić	2013–2015	25
4	Sandi Križman	2012–2014; 2015	17
5	Šime Gržan	2016–2018; 2019–2021	16
6	Dion Drena Beljo	2021–2022	15
7	**Ante Erceg**	2022–present	11
7	Stiven Rivić	2005–2006; 2012	11
9	**Slavko Blagojević**	2012–2014; 2020–present	10
9	Josip Jerneić	2003–2006; 2006–2008	10
11	Stipe Bačelić-Grgić	2012–2013	9
11	Antonio Ivančić	2018–2022	9
11	Ramón Miérez	2018–2019	9

== Kit manufacturers and shirt sponsors ==
Period	Kit manufacturer	Shirt partner
2007–2010	Legea	Puljanka
2011–2012	Jako	Croatia Osiguranje
2012	Puma	Croatia Osiguranje
2013–2016	Errea	Croatia Osiguranje
2016–2018	Nike	Croatia Osiguranje
2018–2021	Kelme	Croatia Osiguranje
2021–2023	Kelme	Germania Sport
2023–present	Joma	Germania Sport

== Honours ==
- Croatian Second Football League
  - Winners (2): 2003–04, 2008–09
- Croatian Third Football League
  - Winners (1): 2000–01
- Croatian Cup
  - Runners-up: 2002–03, 2020–21
  - Semi-finals: 2013–14, 2024–25

== Historical list of coaches ==
- (Socialist Federal Republic of Yugoslavia) Ozren Nedoklan (1959–1960)
- (Socialist Federal Republic of Yugoslavia) Vukašin Višnjevac
- (Croatia) Elvis Scoria (2002–2004)
- (Croatia) Igor Pamić (2004 – Oct 2, 2005)
- (Croatia) Milivoj Bračun (Oct 2, 2005 – Mar 11, 2006)
- (Croatia) Branko Tucak (Jul 2006 – Aug 20, 2006)
- (Croatia) Krunoslav Jurčić (Sep 1, 2006 – Jan 1, 2007)
- (Croatia) Nenad Gračan (Jan 1, 2007 - May 13, 2007)
- (Croatia) Stanko Mršić (May 13, 2007 - Oct 29, 2007
- (Croatia) Elvis Scoria (30 October 2007 – 2 November 2009)
- (Croatia) Valdi Šumberac (2 November 2009 – 27 February 2010)
- (Croatia) Zoran Vulić (28 February 2010 – 22 May 2010)
- (Croatia) Ante Miše (22 May 2010 – 2 August 2010)
- (Croatia) Robert Jarni (4 August 2010 – 19 September 2010)
- (Croatia) Davor Lasić (interim) (19 September 2010 – 5 October 2010)
- (Croatia) Zoran Vulić (6 October 2010 – 21 March 2011)
- (Croatia) Igor Pamić (29 March 2011 – 5 October 2015)
- (Croatia) Robert Rubčić (interim) (5 October 2015 – January 2016)
- (Croatia) Andrej Panadić (January 2016 – 18 July 2016)
- (Croatia) Goran Tomić (26 July 2016 – 1 December 2016)
- (Croatia) Darko Raić-Sudar (interim) (1 December 2016 – 30 December 2016)
- (Croatia) Marijo Tot (30 December 2016 – 19 May 2017)
- (Croatia) Darko Raić-Sudar (interim) (19 May 2017 – 31 May 2017)
- (Croatia) Darko Raić-Sudar (1 June 2017 – 1 June 2018)
- (Spain) Manolo Márquez (1 June 2018 – 18 September 2018)
- (Spain) Curro Torres (19 September 2018 – 27 October 2018)
- (Croatia) Krunoslav Rendulić (28 October 2018 – 4 March 2019)
- (Croatia) Igor Cvitanović (4 March 2019 – 10 June 2019)
- (Croatia) Ivan Prelec (15 June 2019 – 24 August 2020)
- (Croatia) Fausto Budicin (26 August 2020 – 12 February 2021)
- (Croatia) Danijel Jumić (12 February 2021 – 11 June 2021)
- (Spain) Gonzalo García (16 June 2021 – 7 June 2023)
- (Bosnia and Herzegovina) Mislav Karoglan (11 June 2023 – 8 August 2023)
- (Spain) David Català (14 August 2023 – 6 February 2024)
- (Italy) Paolo Tramezzani (8 Feb 2024 –28 December 2024)
- (Spain) (Uruguay) Gonzalo García (4 January 2025 – 30 June 2025)
- (Croatia) Goran Tomić (1 July 2025 – 13 September 2025)
- (Spain) Oriol Riera (18 September 2025 – 19 April 2026)
- (Croatia) Krešimir Režić (20 April 2026 – 29 May 2026)
- (Spain) Javier Cabello (9 June 2026 – present)
