= 2025–26 HNK Rijeka season =

Rijeka
2025–26 season
- President: Damir Mišković
- Head coach: Radomir Đalović (until 1 September 2025); Víctor Sánchez (3 September 2025 – 27 May 2026)
- Stadium: Rujevica
- HNL: 4th
- Croatian Cup: Runners-up
- UEFA Champions League: Second qualifying round
- UEFA Europa League: Play-off round
- UEFA Conference League: Round of 16
- Top goalscorer: League: Toni Fruk (12); All: Toni Fruk (19)
- Highest home attendance: 8,154 v. (France) Strasbourg (12 March 2026)
- Lowest home attendance: 3,431 v. Varaždin (14 February 2026)
- Average home league attendance: 5,382
- Biggest win: 5–0 v Hajduk Split (22 November 2025)
- Biggest defeat: 0–5 v (Greece) PAOK (28 August 2025)
Home colours	Away colours
- All statistics correct as of 23 May 2026.

The 2025–26 season was the 80th season in the existence of HNK Rijeka and the club's 35th consecutive season in the top flight of Croatian football. In addition to the domestic league, Rijeka competed in the Croatian Cup, UEFA Champions League, UEFA Europa League, and UEFA Conference League.

== Season overview ==
=== Opening weeks and managerial change ===
Rijeka entered the season as defending Croatian league and cup champions under head coach Radomir Đalović. Their European campaign began in the second qualifying round of the 2025–26 UEFA Champions League. After drawing 0–0 with Ludogorets Razgrad at Rujevica, Rijeka lost the return match 3–1 after extra time and were eliminated 3–1 on aggregate.

Transferring to the Europa League, Rijeka lost 2–1 at home to Irish champions Shelbourne in the third qualifying round. They overturned the deficit with a 3–1 victory in Dublin, scoring through Toni Fruk, Tiago Dantas and Ante Oreč to progress 4–3 on aggregate. Rijeka then defeated PAOK 1–0 at Rujevica in the first leg of the play-off round, but lost the return match 5–0 in Thessaloniki. The 5–1 aggregate defeat placed Rijeka in the league phase of the Conference League.

Rijeka also made an inconsistent start to their league-title defence, collecting five points from their opening five matches. Following the defeat by PAOK and a 2–2 draw away to Hajduk Split, Đalović was dismissed on 1 September. He departed after 52 matches in charge, having led the club to the league and cup double the previous season. Spanish coach Víctor Sánchez was appointed two days later on a two-year contract.

=== Sánchez and the European campaign ===
Rijeka's domestic results remained uneven during Sánchez's first months, although the team recorded a historic 5–0 victory over Hajduk at Rujevica on 22 November. Fruk scored a first-half hat-trick, while Samuele Vignato and Luka Menalo added second-half goals. It was Rijeka's largest victory over Hajduk in the history of the Adriatic derby.

In the Conference League, Rijeka opened the league phase with a 1–0 defeat away to Noah. They earned their first victory against Sparta Prague at Rujevica in a match played over two days because of heavy rain, with Daniel Adu-Adjei scoring the only goal. Draws against Lincoln Red Imps and AEK Larnaca were followed by a 3–0 home victory over Celje. Rijeka completed the league phase with a 0–0 draw against Shakhtar Donetsk, finishing 16th with nine points and qualifying for the knockout phase play-offs. The result secured the club's first participation in the spring knockout phase of a UEFA competition in 45 years.

Rijeka faced Omonia in the knockout phase play-offs. A 1–0 victory in Nicosia was followed by a 3–1 win at Rujevica, sending Rijeka into the round of 16 with a 4–1 aggregate victory. Against Strasbourg, Rijeka lost the first leg 2–1 at home. Fruk gave them the lead in the return match at the Stade de la Meinau, temporarily levelling the tie on aggregate, but Valentín Barco equalised for Strasbourg in the second half. The 1–1 draw eliminated Rijeka 3–2 on aggregate.

=== Domestic cup and conclusion ===
In the Croatian Cup, Rijeka defeated Maksimir 4–0 and Mladost Ždralovi 4–1 in the opening two rounds. They met Hajduk in the quarter-finals and recovered from falling behind twice to win 3–2, with Fruk and Gabriel Rukavina scoring during second-half stoppage time. A 2–0 semi-final victory over Slaven Belupo sent the defending champions into their third consecutive cup final.

The final was played against Dinamo Zagreb at Opus Arena on 13 May. Two second-half goals from Luka Stojković gave Dinamo a 2–0 victory, leaving Rijeka as cup runners-up.

Rijeka's league campaign included 14 victories, 11 draws and 11 defeats. A five-match unbeaten run at the end of the season kept the club in contention for third place, but victories over Lokomotiva, Vukovar 1991 and Gorica were insufficient to overtake Varaždin. Rijeka finished fourth despite concluding the campaign with a 2–0 home win over Gorica, in which Amer Gojak scored both goals. Fruk finished as the club's leading scorer with 19 goals in all competitions, including 12 in the league.

== Competitions ==
=== Overall ===
Competition	First match	Last match	Starting round	Final position	Record							
Competition	First match	Last match	Starting round	Final position	Pld	W	D	L	GF	GA	GD	Win %
SuperSport HNL	3 August 2025	23 May 2026	Matchday 1	4th	36	14	11	11	49	36	+13	38.89
Croatian Cup	17 September 2025	13 May 2026	First round	Runners-up	5	4	0	1	13	5	+8	80.00
UEFA Champions League	22 July 2025	30 July 2025	Second qualifying round	Second qualifying round	2	0	1	1	1	3	−2	0.00
UEFA Europa League	6 August 2025	28 August 2025	Third qualifying round	Play-off round	4	2	0	2	5	8	−3	50.00
UEFA Conference League	2 October 2025	19 March 2026	League phase	Round of 16	10	4	4	2	11	6	+5	40.00
Total					57	24	16	17	79	58	+21	42.11

Last updated: 23 May 2026
Source: Soccerway

=== SuperSport HNL ===
==== League table ====
Pos	Team	Pld	W	D	L	GF	GA	GD	Pts	Qualification or relegation
2	Hajduk Split	36	20	8	8	61	36	+25	68	Qualification to Europa League first qualifying round (Note: The 2025–26 Croatian Football Cup winners qualified for the Europa League first qualifying round. Since the cup winners (Dinamo Zagreb) qualified based on league position, the Europa League spot was passed to the second-placed team, and the second Conference League spot passed to the fourth-placed team.)
3	Varaždin	36	15	9	12	47	46	+1	54	Qualification to Conference League second qualifying round
4	Rijeka	36	14	11	11	49	36	+13	53	Qualification to Conference League second qualifying round
5	Lokomotiva	36	10	14	12	40	52	−12	44	
6	Istra 1961	36	12	7	17	39	50	−11	43	

Source: SuperSport HNL
Rules for classification: 1) Points; 2) Head-to-head points; 3) Head-to-head goal difference; 4) Head-to-head goals scored (at home if two teams tied); 5) Goal difference; 6) Goals scored; 7) Play-off
(Note: Criteria 2-4 and 7 is only used if deciding champion, teams to international competition or teams for relegation and in that case criteria 6 will not be used).

==== Results summary ====
Overall								Home						Away					
Pld	W	D	L	GF	GA	GD	Pts	W	D	L	GF	GA	GD	W	D	L	GF	GA	GD
36	14	11	11	49	36	+13	53	9	5	4	29	15	+14	5	6	7	20	21	−1

Last updated: 23 May 2026.
Source: SuperSport HNL

==== Results by round ====
Round	1	2	3	4	5	6	7	8	9	10	11	12	13	14	15	16	17	18	19	20	21	22	23	24	25	26	27	28	29	30	31	32	33	34	35	36
Ground	H	A	H	H	A	H	A	H	A	A	H	A	A	H	A	H	A	H	H	A	H	H	A	H	A	H	A	A	H	A	A	H	A	H	A	H
Result	W	D	L	L	D	D	L	D	W	D	W	L	L	W	D	W	W	W	D	L	D	W	L	W	W	L	L	W	L	D	L	D	W	W	D	W
Position	2	3	4	6	7	8	9	9	8	7	7	7	8	8	7	6	4	3	4	5	5	3	3	3	3	3	3	3	3	4	4	4	4	3	4	4

Updated to match(es) played on 23 May 2026. Source: SuperSport HNL
A = Away; H = Home; W = Win; D = Draw; L = Loss

=== Results by opponent ===
Team	Results				Points
Team	1	2	3	4	Points
Dinamo Zagreb	0–2	1–2	0–0	2–2	2
Gorica	3–1	1–0	0–4	2–0	9
Hajduk Split	2–2	5–0	0–1	0–0	5
Istra 1961	0–0	2–1	0–2	0–0	5
Lokomotiva	1–1	1–1	2–0	3–0	8
Osijek	0–0	4–2	0–1	0–2	4
Slaven Belupo	2–0	1–1	2–2	2–0	8
Varaždin	1–2	0–1	3–1	0–1	3
Vukovar 1991	2–3	3–1	1–0	3–0	9

Source: 2025–26 Croatian Football League article

== Matches ==
=== Croatian Football League ===
3 August 2025 1	Rijeka	2–0	Slaven Belupo	Rijeka
18:45 CEST (UTC+02:00)	Jurić (yellow card) 87' (goal) 90+6'; Butić 90+3'	Report	Krušelj (yellow card) 6'; Jakir (yellow card) 45'; Katalinić (yellow card) 57'; I. Božić (yellow card) 61'	Stadium: Rujevica; Attendance: 5,964; Referee: Igor Pajač (Sv. Ivan Zelina)

9 August 2025 2	Osijek	0–0	Rijeka	Osijek
21:00 CEST (UTC+02:00)	Shopov (yellow card) 54'; Vrbančić (yellow card) 85'; Guedes (yellow card) 86'	Report	Ilinković (yellow card) 18'; Menalo (yellow card) 56'; Petrovič (red card) 81'; Dantas (yellow card) 89'; Lasickas (yellow card) 89'	Stadium: Opus Arena; Attendance: 6,132; Referee: Ante Čulina (Zagreb)

16 August 2025 3	Rijeka	0–2	Dinamo Zagreb	Rijeka
21:00 CEST (UTC+02:00)	Devetak (yellow card) 70'; Radeljić (yellow card) 90+3'	Report	Beljo 24' 31' (pen.); Vidović (yellow card) 56'; Hoxha (yellow card) 69'	Stadium: Rujevica; Attendance: 7,076; Referee: Patrik Kolarić (Čakovec)

24 August 2025 4	Rijeka	1–2	Varaždin	Rijeka
21:00 CEST (UTC+02:00)	Fruk 5'; Čop (yellow card) 29'; Devetak (yellow card) 37'; Ndockyt (yellow card) 76'; Gojak (yellow card) 83'	Report	Tavares (yellow card) 9'; Mamut 25' (pen.); Belcar (yellow card) 27'; Mladenovski (yellow card) 45'; Latković 70'; Punčec (yellow card) 81'	Stadium: Rujevica; Attendance: 4,883; Referee: Ante Terzić (Podstrana)

31 August 2025 5	Hajduk Split	2–2	Rijeka	Split
21:00 CEST (UTC+02:00)	Pukštas 42' 90+5'; Pajaziti (yellow card) 70'	Report	Menalo (yellow card) 18' (goal) 21'; Butić (yellow card) 35'; Dantas (yellow card) 39'; Devetak (yellow card) 45+5'; Janković (yellow card) 53'; Bogojević 55'; Radeljić (yellow card) 74'	Stadium: Poljud; Attendance: 29,112; Referee: Dario Bel (Osijek)

13 September 2025 6	Rijeka	1–1	Lokomotiva	Rijeka
19:45 CEST (UTC+02:00)	Janković (yellow card) 8'; Husić 40'; Menalo (yellow card) 51'; Majstorović (yellow card) 68'; Petrovič (yellow card) 87'; Lasickas (yellow card) 90+2'	Report	Dajčer (yellow card) 63' (yellow-red card) 90+1'; Virgili 74'; Leovac (yellow card) 90+4'	Stadium: Rujevica; Attendance: 5,497; Referee: Duje Strukan (Split)

22 September 2025 7	Vukovar 1991	3–2	Rijeka	Vinkovci
18:00 CEST (UTC+02:00)	Mulac (yellow card) 14'; Puljić 20' 56'; González 68' (pen.); Shabani (yellow card) 89'	Report	Fruk 17' (pen.); Oreč 43' (yellow card) 62'; Jurić (yellow card) 90+3'	Stadium: HNK Cibalia; Attendance: 1,055; Referee: Ivan Vukančić (Benkovac)

27 September 2025 8	Rijeka	0–0	Istra 1961	Rijeka
16:00 CEST (UTC+02:00)	Čop (yellow card) 28'; Devetak (yellow card) 36'; Husić (yellow card) 81'	Report		Stadium: Rujevica; Attendance: 5,369; Referee: Ante Čulina (Zagreb)

5 October 2025 9	Gorica	1–3	Rijeka	Velika Gorica
15:45 CEST (UTC+02:00)	Pozo (yellow card) 33'; Čuić 79'	Report	Dantas 22'; Petrovič (yellow card) 50'; Fruk 68'; Adu-Adjei 82'	Stadium: Radnik; Attendance: 735; Referee: Patrik Kolarić (Čakovec)

18 October 2025 10	Slaven Belupo	1–1	Rijeka	Koprivnica
15:30 CEST (UTC+02:00)	Agbekpornu (yellow card) 66'; Filipović 74' (yellow card) 77'	Report	Thaqi (yellow card) 22'; Adu-Adjei 48'; Majstorović (yellow card) 68'; Oreč (yellow card) 73'	Stadium: Gradski; Attendance: 1,447; Referee: Duje Strukan (Split)

27 October 2025 11	Rijeka	4–2	Osijek	Rijeka
16:30 CET (UTC+01:00)	Fruk 10'; Čop 38' 47'; Majstorović (yellow card) 41'; Devetak 54'	Report	Mikolčić 2' (yellow card) 26'; Hasić (yellow card) 57' (yellow-red card) 75'; Jelenić (yellow card) 65'; Farkaš 74'; Petrusenko (yellow card) 90+2'	Stadium: Rujevica; Attendance: 5,096; Referee: Ante Čulina (Zagreb)

1 November 2025 12	Dinamo Zagreb	2–1	Rijeka	Zagreb
16:00 CET (UTC+01:00)	Beljo (yellow card) 21'; Bakrar 29' (yellow card) 78'; Hoxha (yellow card) 54' (goal) 84'; Mišić (yellow card) 78'	Report	Thaqi (yellow card) 45+3'; Devetak (yellow card) 54'; Ndockyt 58'; Gojak (yellow card) 74'; Zlomislić (yellow card) 78'; Majstorović (yellow card) 78'	Stadium: Maksimir; Attendance: 10,237; Referee: Igor Pajač (Sv. Ivan Zelina)

9 November 2025 13	Varaždin	1–0	Rijeka	Varaždin
18:15 CET (UTC+01:00)	Mamić 15'; Duvnjak (yellow card) 74'	Report	Fruk (yellow card) 53'; Petrovič (yellow card) 58'; Bogojević (yellow card) 59'	Stadium: Varteks; Attendance: 1,923; Referee: Dario Bel (Osijek)

22 November 2025 14	Rijeka	5–0	Hajduk Split	Rijeka
18:00 CET (UTC+01:00)	Fruk 5' 22' 32'; Vignato 51'; Menalo 86'	Report		Stadium: Rujevica; Attendance: 6,554; Referee: Mateo Erceg (Benkovac)

30 November 2025 15	Lokomotiva	1–1	Rijeka	Zagreb
15:00 CET (UTC+01:00)	Katić (yellow card) 29'; Stojaković 76' (yellow card) 76'	Report	Jurić 4'; Butić (yellow card) 20'; Radeljić (yellow card) 27'; Majstorović (yellow card) 70'; Devetak (yellow card) 83'	Stadium: Maksimir; Attendance: 513; Referee: Ante Terzić (Podstrana)

6 December 2025 16	Rijeka	3–1	Vukovar 1991	Rijeka
18:00 CET (UTC+01:00)	Radeljić 11'; Oreč 30'; Devetak (yellow card) 58'; Fruk 80' (pen.)	Report	Çalhanoğlu (yellow card) 4'; González (yellow card) 32' (goal) 66'; Pavičić (yellow card) 90+2'	Stadium: Rujevica; Attendance: 4,677; Referee: Ivan Vukančić (Benkovac)

21 December 2025 18	Rijeka	1–0	Gorica	Rijeka
17:45 CET (UTC+01:00)	Petrovič (yellow card) 47'; Jurić 53'; Lasickas (yellow card) 90+3'	Report	Leš (yellow card) 82'; Fiolić (yellow card) 90'	Stadium: Rujevica; Attendance: 4,731; Referee: Dario Bel (Osijek)

20 January 2026 (Note: The match originally started on 14 December 2025 and was abandoned at 15th minute due to dense fog. The match resumed on 20 January 2026, 16:00, from the point of abandonment.) 17	Istra 1961	1–2	Rijeka	Pula
16:00 CET (UTC+01:00)	Lawal 5'; Marešić (yellow card) 76'	Report	Menalo 9'; Dantas 76' (pen.); Vignato (yellow card) 81'; Radeljić (yellow card) 85'	Stadium: Aldo Drosina; Attendance: 3,386; Referee: Ante Čulina (Zagreb)

24 January 2026 19	Rijeka	2–2	Slaven Belupo	Rijeka
17:15 CET (UTC+01:00)	Morchiladze (yellow card) 29'; Majstorović (red card) 45+2'; Ndockyt 66'; Husić (yellow card) 80'; Dantas 85'; Jurić (yellow card) 90+3'	Report	Nestorovski 2'; Šuto (yellow card) 27'; Agbekpornu (yellow card) 78'; Jagušić 83'	Stadium: Rujevica; Attendance: 3,808; Referee: Patrik Pavlešić (Duga Resa)

1 February 2026 20	Osijek	1–0	Rijeka	Osijek
15:00 CET (UTC+01:00)	Akere 27'; Hasić (yellow card) 32'; Jelenić (yellow card) 70'; Matković (yellow card) 85'; Petrusenko (yellow card) 90+1'	Report	Radeljić (yellow card) 45+1'	Stadium: Opus Arena; Attendance: 3,262; Referee: Igor Pajač (Sv. Ivan Zelina)

8 February 2026 21	Rijeka	0–0	Dinamo Zagreb	Rijeka
17:45 CET (UTC+01:00)		Report	Zajc (yellow card) 24'	Stadium: Rujevica; Attendance: 7,102; Referee: Dario Bel (Osijek)

14 February 2026 22	Rijeka	3–1	Varaždin	Rijeka
17:15 CET (UTC+01:00)	Fruk (penalty missed) 10'; Jurić (yellow card) 11' (goal) 48'; Dantas 20'; Radeljić (yellow card) 47'; Petrovič 62'; Lasickas (yellow card) 84'	Report	Sikošek (yellow card) 65'; Vuk (yellow card) 75'; Lesjak 90+1'	Stadium: Rujevica; Attendance: 3,431; Referee: Duje Strukan (Split)

22 February 2026 23	Hajduk Split	1–0	Rijeka	Split
17:45 CET (UTC+01:00)	Šego (yellow card) 14'; Livaja 79'; Sigur (red card) 80'; Hodak (yellow card) 90+3'	Report	Adu-Adjei (yellow card) 20'; Petrovič (red card) 45'; Oreč (yellow card) 90+5'	Stadium: Stadion Poljud; Attendance: 23,542; Referee: Dario Bel (Osijek)

1 March 2026 24	Rijeka	2–0	Lokomotiva	Rijeka
15:00 CET (UTC+01:00)	Dantas 13'; Lasickas (yellow card) 46'; Fruk (yellow card) 54'; Morchiladze (yellow card) 74'; Barco (yellow card) 90'; Adu-Adjei 90+6'	Report	Stojaković (yellow card) 5'; Jukić (yellow card) 86'	Stadium: Rujevica; Attendance: 4,986; Referee: Mateo Erceg (Benkovac)

8 March 2026 25	Vukovar 1991	0–1	Rijeka	Osijek
17:45 CET (UTC+01:00)	Banovec (yellow card) 29'	Report	Fruk 51' (pen.)	Stadium: Gradski Vrt; Attendance: 1,155; Referee: Igor Pajač (Sv. Ivan Zelina)

15 March 2026 26	Rijeka	0–2	Istra 1961	Rijeka
17:45 CET (UTC+01:00)	Husić (yellow card) 36'; Oreč (yellow card) 90+2'; Dantas (yellow card) 90+5'	Report	Prevljak 2'; Frederiksen 9'; Šepić (yellow card) 73'; Heister (yellow card) 90+5'	Stadium: Rujevica; Attendance: 5,897; Referee: Ante Terzić (Podstrana)

22 March 2026 27	Gorica	4–0	Rijeka	Velika Gorica
17:45 CET (UTC+01:00)	Erceg 12'; Bogojević 52' 70' 76'; Pršir (penalty missed) 68'; Filipović (yellow card) 79'	Report	Rukavina (yellow card) 83'; Barco (yellow card) 86'	Stadium: Radnik; Attendance: 1,373; Referee: Duje Strukan (Split)

4 April 2026 28	Slaven Belupo	0–2	Rijeka	Koprivnica
17:45 CEST (UTC+02:00)		Report	Fruk 5' (pen.) 15'; Barco (yellow card) 81'	Stadium: Gradski; Attendance: 1,337; Referee: Ante Čulina (Zagreb)

12 April 2026 29	Rijeka	0–2	Osijek	Rijeka
16:00 CEST (UTC+02:00)	Radeljić (yellow card) 21'; Oreč (yellow card) 38'; Barco (yellow card) 44'; Devetak (yellow card) 86'	Report	Akere 5'; Mejía (yellow card) 32'; Omerović 90+4'	Stadium: Rujevica; Attendance: 4,919; Referee: Mateo Erceg (Benkovac)

18 April 2026 30	Dinamo Zagreb	2–2	Rijeka	Zagreb
16:00 CEST (UTC+02:00)	Beljo 5' 86' (pen.); Valinčić (yellow card) 64'	Report	Dantas (yellow card) 49' (goal) 51' (pen.) 71' (pen.); Oreč (yellow card) 57' (yellow-red card) 84'; Radeljić (yellow card) 84'	Stadium: Maksimir; Attendance: 11,178; Referee: Patrik Pavlešić (Duga Resa)

22 April 2026 31	Varaždin	1–0	Rijeka	Varaždin
17:45 CEST (UTC+02:00)	Mamić 54' (pen.); Latković (yellow card) 67'	Report	Majstorović (yellow card) 67'	Stadium: Varteks; Attendance: 3,540; Referee: Duje Strukan (Split)

26 April 2026 32	Rijeka	0–0	Hajduk Split	Rijeka
16:00 CEST (UTC+02:00)	Barco (yellow card) 67'	Report	Raçi (yellow card) 25'; Pukštas (yellow card) 73'; Almena (yellow card) 85'; Brajković (yellow card) 86'	Stadium: Rujevica; Attendance: 7,665; Referee: Ante Čulina (Zagreb)

3 May 2026 33	Lokomotiva	0–3	Rijeka	Zagreb
16:00 CEST (UTC+02:00)	Vešović (yellow card) 51'; Pajač (yellow card) 52'; Bošković (yellow card) 90'	Report	Adu-Adjei 14' 54'; Ndockyt 81'	Stadium: Maksimir; Attendance: 418; Referee: Ante Terzić (Podstrana)

8 May 2026 34	Rijeka	3–0	Vukovar 1991	Rijeka
20:00 CEST (UTC+01:00)	Adu-Adjei 41'; Radeljić 50'; Majstorović (yellow card) 75'; Fruk 90+4'	Report	Živković (yellow card) 44'; Gurlica (yellow card) 66'	Stadium: Rujevica; Attendance: 5,011; Referee: Ante Čulina (Zagreb)

17 May 2026 35	Istra 1961	0–0	Rijeka	Pula
18:45 CEST (UTC+02:00)	Prevljak (yellow card) 36'; Heister (yellow card) 84'	Report	Barco (yellow card) 43'; Pavić (yellow card) 43'; Legbo (red card) 56'	Stadium: Aldo Drosina; Attendance: 3,249; Referee: Ante Terzić (Podstrana)

23 May 2026 36	Rijeka	2–0	Gorica	Rijeka
16:00 CEST (UTC+02:00)	Gojak 66' 85'	Report	Moustapha (yellow card) 55'; Bakić (yellow card) 79'; Erceg (yellow card) 80'	Stadium: Rujevica; Attendance: 4,208; Referee: Duje Strukan (Split)

=== Croatian Cup ===
17 September 2025 R1	Maksimir	0–4	Rijeka	Rijeka
18:00 CEST (UTC+02:00)	Palić (yellow card) 61'; Nežić (yellow card) 84'	Report	Dantas 63'; Jurić 68'; Adu-Adjei 72'; Gojak 89'	Stadium: Rujevica; Attendance: 3,027; Referee: Nikola Vuković (Osijek)

3 December 2025 R2	Mladost Ždralovi	1–4	Rijeka	Ždralovi
13:00 CET (UTC+01:00)	Nikolić 5'; Bubnić (yellow card) 72'	Report	Husić (yellow card) 4'; Čop 48' 51' 62'; Radeljić (yellow card) 55'; Vignato 58'	Stadium: Brdo; Attendance: 750; Referee: Oliver Romić (Osijek)

4 March 2026 QF	Rijeka	3–2	Hajduk Split	Rijeka
20:00 CET (UTC+01:00)	Fruk (yellow card) 8' (penalty missed) 90+19' 90+19'; Devetak (yellow card) 27'; Dantas (yellow card) 45+5' (goal) 57' (pen.); Rukavina 90+20'	Report	Raçi (yellow card) 18'; Rebić (yellow card) 19'; Pukštas 25'; Skelin (yellow card) 50'; Šego (yellow card) 52'; Guillamón (yellow card) 90+2'; Brajković 90+5'; Pajaziti (red card) 90+21'	Stadium: Rujevica; Attendance: 7,355; Referee: Patrik Kolarić (Čakovec)

8 April 2026 SF	Rijeka	2–0	Slaven Belupo	Rijeka
16:30 CEST (UTC+02:00)	Gojak 71'; Legbo (yellow card) 73' (goal) 84'	Report	Kovačić (yellow card) 63'	Stadium: Rujevica; Attendance: 5,972; Referee: Igor Pajač (Sv. Ivan Zelina)

13 May 2026 Final	Dinamo Zagreb	2–0	Rijeka	Osijek
18:00 CEST (UTC+02:00)	Stojković 50' 57'; Goda (yellow card) 90+3'	Report	Majstorović (yellow card) 83'	Stadium: Opus Arena; Attendance: 11,055; Referee: Mateo Erceg (Benkovac)

=== UEFA Champions League ===
22 July 2025 QR2	Rijeka (Croatia)	0–0	(Bulgaria) Ludogorets Razgrad	Rijeka, Croatia
20:45 CEST (UTC+02:00)	Oreč (yellow card) 38'; Devetak (yellow card) 42'	Report	Verdon (yellow card) 34'; Bile (yellow card) 36'; Kaloč (yellow card) 52'; Tekpetey (yellow card) 57'; Duarte (yellow card) 73'; Son (yellow card) 90'	Stadium: Rujevica; Attendance: 7,731; Referee: Elchin Masiyev (Azerbaijan)

30 July 2025 QR2	Ludogorets Razgrad (Bulgaria)	3–1 (a.e.t.) (3–1 agg.)	(Croatia) Rijeka	Razgrad, Bulgaria
20:30 EEST (UTC+03:00)	Piotrowski 19' (pen.); Son (yellow card) 50'; Verdon (yellow card) 90+1'; Chochev 107'; Ivanov 117'	Report	Oreč (yellow card) 39'; Devetak (yellow card) 49'; Gojak 71'; Rukavina (red card) 77'; Fruk (red card) 90+9'; Lasickas (yellow card) 112'	Stadium: Huvepharma Arena; Attendance: 6,382; Referee: John Beaton (Scotland)

=== UEFA Europa League ===
6 August 2025 QR3	Rijeka (Croatia)	1–2	(Republic of Ireland) Shelbourne	Rijeka, Croatia
20:45 CEST (UTC+02:00)	Janković 56' (pen.)	Report	Bone 58'; Martin 70'	Stadium: Rujevica; Attendance: 6,495; Referee: Ricardo de Burgos Bengoetxea (Spain)

12 August 2025 QR3	Shelbourne (Republic of Ireland)	1–3 (3–4 agg.)	(Croatia) Rijeka	Dublin, Republic of Ireland
19:45 WEST (UTC+01:00)	Odubeko 86' (pen.)	Report	Fruk 33'; Dantas 73'; Oreč (yellow card) 87' (goal) 90'	Stadium: Tolka Park; Attendance: 3,655; Referee: Marian Alexandru Barbu (Romania)

21 August 2025 PO	Rijeka (Croatia)	1–0	(Greece) PAOK	Rijeka, Croatia
20:45 CEST (UTC+02:00)	Janković (yellow card) 21'; Menalo 39'; Čop (yellow card) 67'	Report	Kenny (yellow card) 7'; Ivanušec (yellow card) 46'; Živković (yellow card) 55'; Michailidis (yellow card) 70'; Kędziora (yellow card) 71'	Stadium: Rujevica; Attendance: 6,882; Referee: Ivan Kružliak (Slovakia)

28 August 2025 PO	PAOK (Greece)	5–0 (5–1 agg.)	(Croatia) Rijeka	Thessaloniki, Greece
20:30 EEST (UTC+03:00)	Meite 12'; Konstantelias 25'; Chalov 56'; Giakoumakis 77'; Pelkas 89'	Report	Majstorović (yellow card) 34' (yellow-red card) 71'	Stadium: Toumba Stadium; Attendance: 24,223; Referee: José María Sánchez Martínez (Spain)

=== UEFA Conference League ===
2 October 2025 LP	Noah (Armenia)	1–0	(Croatia) Rijeka	Yerevan, Armenia
20:45 AMT (UTC+04:00)	Mulahusejnović 6'; Ferreira (yellow card) 71'	Report	Janković (red card) 29'; Menalo (yellow card) 44'; Husić (yellow card) 76'; Petrovič (yellow card) 86'	Stadium: Vazgen Sargsyan Republican Stadium; Attendance: 11,500; Referee: Radoslav Gidzhenov (Bulgaria)

23 October 2025 (Note: The match was abandoned at half-time due to adverse weather conditions. The match resumed on 24 October 2025, 16:00, from the point of abandonment.) LP	Rijeka (Croatia)	1–0	(Czech Republic) Sparta Prague	Rijeka, Croatia
18:45 CEST (UTC+02:00)	Oreč (yellow card) 71'; Adu-Adjei 75'; Petrovič (yellow card) 81'	Report	Mannsverk (yellow card) 36'; Sørensen (yellow card) 47'; Preciado (yellow card) 73'; Ševínský (yellow card) 79'; Kuchta (yellow card) 90+4'	Stadium: Rujevica; Attendance: 3,578; Referee: Robert Jones (England)

6 November 2025 LP	Lincoln Red Imps (Gibraltar)	1–1	(Croatia) Rijeka	Gibraltar
21:00 CET (UTC+01:00)	Mandi (yellow card) 23' (penalty missed) 69'; De Barr (yellow card) 73'; Gómez 83' (yellow card) 90+4'	Report	Ndockyt (yellow card) 12'; Devetak (yellow card) 21'; Fruk 41'; Jurić (yellow card) 55'	Stadium: Europa Sports Park; Attendance: 1,194; Referee: Philip Farrugia (Malta)

27 November 2025 LP	Rijeka (Croatia)	0–0	(Cyprus) AEK Larnaca	Rijeka, Croatia
21:00 CET (UTC+01:00)	Majstorović (yellow card) 90+7'	Report	Rubio (yellow card) 13'; Gnali (yellow card) 45'; Naoum (yellow card) 56'; Pons (yellow card) 60'; Miramón (yellow card) 60'; Saborit (yellow card) 90+3'; Miličević (yellow card) 90+3'	Stadium: Rujevica; Attendance: 5,461; Referee: Rob Hennessy (Republic of Ireland)

11 December 2025 LP	Rijeka (Croatia)	3–0	(Slovenia) Celje	Rijeka, Croatia
21:00 CET (UTC+01:00)	Majstorović (yellow card) 19'; Petrovič (yellow card) 45+1' (goal) 71'; Adu-Adjei 56'; Fruk 78'	Report	Nieto (yellow card) 40'; Tutyškinas (red card) 76'	Stadium: Rujevica; Attendance: 5,693; Referee: Andrea Colombo (Italy)

18 December 2025 LP	Shakhtar Donetsk (Ukraine)	0–0	(Croatia) Rijeka	Kraków, Poland
21:00 CET (UTC+01:00)	Bondar (yellow card) 51'	Report	Oreč (yellow card) 55'; Radeljić (yellow card) 72'; Ndockyt (yellow card) 78'	Stadium: Henryk Reyman Municipal Stadium; Attendance: 4,367; Referee: Anthony Taylor (England)

19 February 2026 KPO	Omonia (Cyprus)	0–1	(Croatia) Rijeka	Nicosia, Cyprus
22:00 EET (UTC+02:00)	P. Andreou (yellow card) 37'; Christou (yellow card) 49'; Semedo (yellow card) 84'; Masouras (yellow card) 87'	Report	Ndockyt (yellow card) 39'; Barišić (yellow card) 54'; Morchiladze (yellow card) 79' (yellow-red card) 89'; Adu-Adjei 86'	Stadium: GSP Stadium; Attendance: 8,990; Referee: Juxhin Xhaja (Albania)

26 February 2026 KPO	Rijeka (Croatia)	3–1 (4–1 agg.)	(Cyprus) Omonia	Rijeka, Croatia
18:45 CET (UTC+01:00)	Barco (yellow card) 43'; Fruk 52' 67'; Adu-Adjei 79'	Report	Tanković 13'; Ewandro (yellow card) 25'; Odubajo (yellow card) 41'; Balkovec (yellow card) 56'; Masouras (yellow card) 90+2'	Stadium: Rujevica; Attendance: 6,965; Referee: Mykola Balakin (Ukraine)

12 March 2026 R16	Rijeka (Croatia)	1–2	(France) Strasbourg	Rijeka, Croatia
18:45 CET (UTC+01:00)	Fruk (yellow card) 45'; Majstorović (yellow card) 53' (goal) 76'	Report	Panichelli 2'; Doukouré (yellow card) 29'; Omobamidele (yellow card) 47'; Godo 72'; Doué (yellow card) 84'	Stadium: Rujevica; Attendance: 8,154; Referee: Vasilios Fotias (Greece)

19 March 2026 R16	Strasbourg (France)	1–1 (3–2 agg.)	(Croatia) Rijeka	Strasbourg, France
21:00 CET (UTC+01:00)	V. Barco 71'	Report	Fruk 21'; Husić (yellow card) 31'; Radeljić (yellow card) 68'; A. Barco (yellow card) 90+5'	Stadium: Stade de la Meinau; Attendance: 24,233; Referee: Mykola Balakin (Ukraine)

=== Friendlies ===
==== Pre-season ====
28 June 2025 Friendly	Rijeka (Croatia)	2–1	(Slovenia) Primorje	Rijeka, Croatia
18:30 CEST (UTC+02:00)	Yankov 41'; Bogojević 77'; Fruk (yellow card); Majstorović (yellow card)	Report	Hodžić 6'; Pará (red card) 35'; Bešir (red card) 83'; Ficko (yellow card); Rafiu (yellow card); Soto (yellow card)	Stadium: Rujevica; Attendance: Behind closed doors Referee: Marin Rožman (Rijeka)

5 July 2025 Friendly	Rijeka (Croatia)	4–1	(Ukraine) Oleksandriya	Kranjska Gora, Slovenia
17:45 CEST (UTC+02:00)	Majstorović 7'; Čop 33'; Gojak 83'; Jurić 88'	Report	Jota 73'	Stadium: SRC Ruteč; Attendance: Behind closed doors Referee: Andrej Žnidaršič (Kranj)

9 July 2025 Friendly	Rijeka (Croatia)	0–2 (Note: The game was played with 60 minute halves.)	(Serbia) Čukarički	Kranjska Gora, Slovenia
17:00 CEST (UTC+02:00)	Bogojević (yellow card) 64'	Report	Tufegdžić 36'; Miladinović 58'	Stadium: SRC Ruteč; Attendance: 50; Referee: David Šmajc (Kranj)

13 July 2025 Friendly	Rijeka (Croatia)	2–1	(Slovenia) Bravo	Kranjska Gora, Slovenia
11:00 CEST (UTC+02:00)	Gojak 12'; Jurić (penalty missed) 66' 66'	Report	Jovan 63'	Stadium: SRC Ruteč; Attendance: 100; Referee: David Šmajc (Kranj)

13 July 2025 Friendly	Rijeka (Croatia)	0–1	(Turkey) Göztepe	Kranjska Gora, Slovenia
17:00 CEST (UTC+02:00)	Fruk (yellow card) 85'; Dantas (yellow card) 87'	Report	Tijanić 28'; Kurtulan (yellow card) 51'; Bokele (yellow card) 85'	Stadium: SRC Ruteč; Attendance: 100; Referee: Andrej Žnidaršič (Kranj)

==== In-season (2025) ====
23 July 2025 Friendly	Rijeka (Croatia)	2–0	(Slovenia) Brinje Grosuplje	Rijeka, Croatia
11:00 CEST (UTC+02:00)	Jurić 13'; Ilinković 90'	Report		Stadium: Rujevica; Attendance: Behind closed doors Referee: Mario Prpić (Rijeka)

==== Mid-season ====
14 January 2026 Friendly	Rijeka (Croatia)	1–2 (Note: The game was played in 3 thirds of 40 minutes.)	(Slovenia) Koper	Rijeka, Croatia
13:00 CET (UTC+01:00)	Morchiladze 94'	Report	Ruedl 63'; Rimac 71' (pen.)	Stadium: Rujevica; Attendance: Behind closed doors Referee: Milan Kukuljan (Podkilavac)

==== In-season (2026) ====
3 February 2026 Friendly	Rijeka	1–2	Opatija	Rijeka
12:00 CET (UTC+01:00)	Ndockyt 47'	Report	Saho 51' 70'	Stadium: Rujevica (training ground); Attendance: Behind closed doors Referee: Marin Rožman (Rijeka)

== Player seasonal records ==
Updated 23 May 2026. Competitive matches only.

=== Goals ===
Rank	Name	League	Europe	Cup	Total
1	(Croatia) Toni Fruk	12	6	1	19
2	(England) Daniel Adu-Adjei	6	4	1	11
3	(Portugal) Tiago Dantas	7	1	2	10
4	(Croatia) Ante Matej Jurić	4	–	1	5
4	(Bosnia and Herzegovina) Amer Gojak	2	1	2	5
4	(Croatia) Duje Čop	2	–	3	5
7	(Bosnia and Herzegovina) Luka Menalo	3	1	–	4
8	(Republic of the Congo) Merveil Ndockyt	3	–	–	3
8	(Croatia) Ante Oreč	2	1	–	3
10	(Bosnia and Herzegovina) Stjepan Radeljić	2	–	–	2
10	(Slovenia) Dejan Petrovič	1	1	–	2
10	(Italy) Samuele Vignato	1	–	1	2
13	(Croatia) Bruno Bogojević	1	–	–	1
13	(Croatia) Šimun Butić	1	–	–	1
13	(Serbia) Mladen Devetak	1	–	–	1
13	(Switzerland) Anel Husić	1	–	–	1
13	(Croatia) Niko Janković	–	1	–	1
13	(Croatia) Ante Majstorović	–	1	–	1
13	(Ivory Coast) Dimitri Legbo	–	–	1	1
13	(Croatia) Gabriel Rukavina	–	–	1	1
TOTALS		49	17	13	79

Source: Competitive matches

=== Clean sheets ===
Rank	Name	League	Europe	Cup	Total
1	(Bosnia and Herzegovina) Martin Zlomislić	11	7	1	19
2	(Serbia) Aleksa Todorović	3	–	2	5
TOTALS		14	7	3	24

Source: Competitive matches

=== Disciplinary record ===
Number	Position	Player	HNL			Europe			Croatian Cup			Total		
Number	Position	Player	Yellow card	(yellow card) (yellow-red card)	Red card	Yellow card	(yellow card) (yellow-red card)	Red card	Yellow card	(yellow card) (yellow-red card)	Red card	Yellow card	(yellow card) (yellow-red card)	Red card
4	MF	(Croatia) Niko Janković	2	0	0	1	0	1	0	0	0	3	0	1
6	DF	(Bosnia and Herzegovina) Stjepan Radeljić	8	0	0	2	0	0	1	0	0	11	0	0
7	MF	(Georgia (country)) Tornike Morchiladze	2	0	0	0	1	0	0	0	0	2	1	0
8	MF	(Slovenia) Dejan Petrovič	4	0	2	3	0	0	0	0	0	7	0	2
9	FW	(Croatia) Duje Čop	2	0	0	1	0	0	0	0	0	3	0	0
10	MF	(Croatia) Toni Fruk	2	0	0	1	0	1	1	0	0	4	0	1
11	FW	(Croatia) Gabriel Rukavina	1	0	0	0	0	1	0	0	0	1	0	1
13	GK	(Bosnia and Herzegovina) Martin Zlomislić	1	0	0	0	0	0	0	0	0	1	0	0
14	MF	(Bosnia and Herzegovina) Amer Gojak	2	0	0	0	0	0	0	0	0	2	0	0
17	MF	(Bosnia and Herzegovina) Luka Menalo	3	0	0	1	0	0	0	0	0	4	0	0
18	FW	(England) Daniel Adu-Adjei	1	0	0	0	0	0	0	0	0	1	0	0
19	MF	(Italy) Samuele Vignato	1	0	0	0	0	0	0	0	0	1	0	0
20	MF	(Republic of the Congo) Merveil Ndockyt	1	0	0	3	0	0	0	0	0	4	0	0
21	MF	(Bosnia and Herzegovina) Silvio Ilinković	1	0	0	0	0	0	0	0	0	1	0	0
22	DF	(Croatia) Ante Oreč	5	1	0	5	0	0	0	0	0	10	1	0
23	DF	(Lithuania) Justas Lasickas	5	0	0	1	0	0	0	0	0	6	0	0
24	DF	(Ivory Coast) Dimitri Legbo	0	0	1	0	0	0	1	0	0	1	0	1
25	FW	(Croatia) Dominik Thaqi	2	0	0	0	0	0	0	0	0	2	0	0
26	MF	(Portugal) Tiago Dantas	4	0	0	0	0	0	1	0	0	5	0	0
27	FW	(Croatia) Šimun Butić	2	0	0	0	0	0	0	0	0	2	0	0
28	DF	(Croatia) Teo Barišić	0	0	0	1	0	0	0	0	0	1	0	0
30	MF	(Croatia) Bruno Bogojević	1	0	0	0	0	0	0	0	0	1	0	0
34	DF	(Serbia) Mladen Devetak	8	0	0	3	0	0	1	0	0	12	0	0
45	DF	(Croatia) Ante Majstorović	7	0	1	3	1	0	1	0	0	11	1	1
51	DF	(Switzerland) Anel Husić	3	0	0	2	0	0	1	0	0	6	0	0
55	MF	(Peru) Alfonso Barco	6	0	0	2	0	0	0	0	0	8	0	0
66	MF	(Croatia) Branko Pavić	1	0	0	0	0	0	0	0	0	1	0	0
77	FW	(Croatia) Ante Matej Jurić	4	0	0	1	0	0	0	0	0	5	0	0
TOTALS			79	1	4	30	2	3	7	0	0	116	3	7

Source: nk-rijeka.hr

=== Appearances and goals ===
Number	Position	Player	Apps	Goals	Apps	Goals	Apps	Goals	Apps	Goals
Number	Position	Player	Total		HNL (Note: First number represents appearances in starting eleven, while the second number indicates a substitute appearance.)		Europe		Croatian Cup	
2	DF	(Croatia) Lovro Kitin	5	0	0+3	0	0+0	0	1+1	0
4	MF	(Croatia) Niko Janković	23	1	11+2	0	7+2	1	0+1	0
6	DF	(Bosnia and Herzegovina) Stjepan Radeljić	42	2	22+3	2	13+0	0	4+0	0
7	MF	(Georgia (country)) Tornike Morchiladze	13	0	5+5	0	0+2	0	0+1	0
7	FW	(Montenegro) Omar Sijarić	1	0	0+0	0	0+0	0	0+1	0
8	MF	(Slovenia) Dejan Petrovič	32	2	16+4	1	9+3	1	0+0	0
9	FW	(Croatia) Duje Čop	37	5	11+14	2	1+7	0	1+3	3
10	MF	(Croatia) Toni Fruk	50	19	27+4	12	15+0	6	4+0	1
11	FW	(Croatia) Gabriel Rukavina	18	1	5+8	0	0+3	0	1+1	1
13	GK	(Bosnia and Herzegovina) Martin Zlomislić	53	0	33+0	0	16+0	0	4+0	0
14	MF	(Bosnia and Herzegovina) Amer Gojak	44	5	15+15	2	5+5	1	3+1	2
15	MF	(Croatia) Goran Grulović	1	0	0+1	0	0+0	0	0+0	0
16	DF	(Croatia) Viktor Vešligaj	1	0	0+1	0	0+0	0	0+0	0
17	FW	(Bosnia and Herzegovina) Luka Menalo	27	4	10+5	3	6+5	1	0+1	0
18	FW	(England) Daniel Adu-Adjei	42	11	15+12	6	7+3	4	5+0	1
19	MF	(Italy) Samuele Vignato	25	2	9+6	1	5+2	0	1+2	1
20	MF	(Republic of the Congo) Merveil Ndockyt	36	3	9+12	3	11+2	0	1+1	0
21	MF	(Bosnia and Herzegovina) Silvio Ilinković	6	0	2+2	0	0+1	0	1+0	0
22	DF	(Croatia) Ante Oreč	50	3	27+3	2	15+0	1	5+0	0
23	DF	(Lithuania) Justas Lasickas	47	0	15+14	0	7+9	0	1+1	0
24	DF	(Ivory Coast) Dimitri Legbo	16	1	6+8	0	0+0	0	0+2	1
25	FW	(Croatia) Dominik Thaqi	8	0	5+1	0	2+0	0	0+0	0
26	MF	(Portugal) Tiago Dantas	52	10	29+2	7	13+3	1	4+1	2
27	FW	(Croatia) Šimun Butić	12	1	3+3	1	1+4	0	0+1	0
28	DF	(Croatia) Teo Barišić	9	0	4+2	0	2+0	0	1+0	0
30	MF	(Croatia) Bruno Bogojević	15	1	3+7	1	0+5	0	0+0	0
34	DF	(Serbia) Mladen Devetak	49	1	27+2	1	14+1	0	5+0	0
45	DF	(Croatia) Ante Majstorović	48	1	31+0	0	13+0	1	4+0	0
51	DF	(Switzerland) Anel Husić	31	1	17+2	1	6+3	0	2+1	0
55	MF	(Peru) Alfonso Barco	22	0	11+4	0	4+0	0	3+0	0
64	MF	(Bulgaria) Dominik Yankov	2	0	0+0	0	0+1	0	1+0	0
66	MF	(Croatia) Branko Pavić	10	0	7+2	0	0+0	0	1+0	0
77	FW	(Croatia) Ante Matej Jurić	39	5	13+13	4	4+6	0	1+2	1
87	MF	(Croatia) Damir Kreilach	2	0	0+1	0	0+1	0	0+0	0
91	DF	(Croatia) Noel Bodetić	11	0	5+5	0	0+0	0	0+1	0
99	GK	(Serbia) Aleksa Todorović	5	0	3+0	0	0+0	0	1+1	0

Source: nk-rijeka.hr

=== Suspensions ===
Date Incurred	Competition	Player	Games Missed	Reason
30 Jul 2025	UCL	(Croatia) Toni Fruk	1	Red card
30 Jul 2025	UCL	(Croatia) Gabriel Rukavina	2	Red card
9 Aug 2025	HNL	(Slovenia) Dejan Petrovič	2	Red card
12 Aug 2025	UEL	(Croatia) Ante Oreč	1	Yellow card
28 Aug 2025	UEL	(Croatia) Ante Majstorović	1	(yellow card) (yellow-red card)
27 Sep 2025	HNL	(Serbia) Mladen Devetak	1	Yellow card
2 Oct 2025	UECL	(Croatia) Niko Janković	3	Red card
1 Nov 2025	HNL	(Croatia) Ante Majstorović	1	Yellow card
11 Dec 2025	UECL	(Slovenia) Dejan Petrovič	1	Yellow card
21 Dec 2025	HNL	(Slovenia) Dejan Petrovič	1	Yellow card
20 Jan 2026	HNL	(Bosnia and Herzegovina) Stjepan Radeljić	1	Yellow card
24 Jan 2026	HNL	(Croatia) Ante Majstorović	2	Red card
14 Feb 2026	HNL	(Croatia) Ante Matej Jurić	1	Yellow card
14 Feb 2026	HNL	(Lithuania) Justas Lasickas	1	Yellow card
19 Feb 2026	UECL	(Georgia (country)) Tornike Morchiladze	1	(yellow card) (yellow-red card)
19 Feb 2026	UECL	(Republic of the Congo) Merveil Ndockyt	1	Yellow card
22 Feb 2026	HNL	(Slovenia) Dejan Petrovič	2	Red card
12 Mar 2026	UECL	(Croatia) Ante Majstorović	1	Yellow card
15 Mar 2026	HNL	(Croatia) Ante Oreč	1	Yellow card
12 Apr 2026	HNL	(Peru) Alfonso Barco	1	Yellow card
12 Apr 2026	HNL	(Serbia) Mladen Devetak	1	Yellow card
18 Apr 2026	HNL	(Portugal) Tiago Dantas	1	Yellow card
18 Apr 2026	HNL	(Croatia) Ante Oreč	1	(yellow card) (yellow-red card)
18 Apr 2026	HNL	(Bosnia and Herzegovina) Stjepan Radeljić	1	Yellow card
17 May 2026	HNL	(Ivory Coast) Dimitri Legbo	2	Red card

=== Penalties ===
For
Date	Competition	Player	Opposition	Scored?
6 Aug 2025	UEL	(Croatia) Niko Janković	Shelbourne	✓
22 Sep 2025	HNL	(Croatia) Toni Fruk	Vukovar 1991	✓
6 Dec 2025	HNL	(Croatia) Toni Fruk	Vukovar 1991	✓
20 Jan 2026	HNL	(Portugal) Tiago Dantas	Istra 1961	✓
14 Feb 2026	HNL	(Croatia) Toni Fruk	Varaždin	✗
4 Mar 2026	Cup	(Portugal) Tiago Dantas	Hajduk Split	✓
4 Mar 2026	Cup	(Croatia) Toni Fruk	Hajduk Split	✗
8 Mar 2026	HNL	(Croatia) Toni Fruk	Vukovar 1991	✓
4 Apr 2026	HNL	(Croatia) Toni Fruk	Slaven Belupo	✓
18 Apr 2026	HNL	(Portugal) Tiago Dantas	Dinamo Zagreb	✓
18 Apr 2026	HNL	(Portugal) Tiago Dantas	Dinamo Zagreb	✓
Against
Date	Competition	Goalkeeper	Opposition	Scored?
30 Jul 2025	UCL	(Bosnia and Herzegovina) Martin Zlomislić	Ludogorets Razgrad	✓
12 Aug 2025	UEL	(Bosnia and Herzegovina) Martin Zlomislić	Shelbourne	✓
16 Aug 2025	HNL	(Bosnia and Herzegovina) Martin Zlomislić	Dinamo Zagreb	✓
24 Aug 2025	HNL	(Bosnia and Herzegovina) Martin Zlomislić	Varaždin	✓
22 Sep 2025	HNL	(Bosnia and Herzegovina) Martin Zlomislić	Vukovar 1991	✓
6 Nov 2025	UECL	(Bosnia and Herzegovina) Martin Zlomislić	Lincoln Red Imps	✗
22 Mar 2026	HNL	(Bosnia and Herzegovina) Martin Zlomislić	Gorica	✗
18 Apr 2026	HNL	(Bosnia and Herzegovina) Martin Zlomislić	Dinamo Zagreb	✓
22 Apr 2026	HNL	(Bosnia and Herzegovina) Martin Zlomislić	Varaždin	✓

== Transfers ==
=== In ===
Date	Pos.	Player	Moving from	Type	Fee	Ref.
3 Jun 2025	RW	(Montenegro) Omar Sijarić	(Germany) Erzgebirge Aue	Transfer	Free	
21 Jun 2025	AM	(Bulgaria) Dominik Yankov	(Canada) CF Montréal	Transfer	€350,000	
25 Jun 2025	RB	(Lithuania) Justas Lasickas	(Slovenia) Olimpija Ljubljana	Transfer	Free	
25 Jun 2025	AM	(Republic of the Congo) Merveil Ndockyt	(Croatia) Gorica	Transfer	Free	
26 Jun 2025	GK	(Croatia) Domagoj Ivan Marić	(Croatia) Karlovac 1919	Return from loan	—N/a	
26 Jun 2025	CB	(Switzerland) Anel Husić	(Switzerland) Young Boys	Transfer	€400,000	
26 Jun 2025	CF	(Serbia) Komnen Andrić	(Croatia) Lokomotiva Zagreb	Return from loan	—N/a	
30 Jun 2025	GK	(Croatia) Josip Posavec	(Slovenia) Primorje	Return from loan	—N/a	
30 Jun 2025	RW	(North Macedonia) Matej Momčilovski	(Slovenia) Brinje Grosuplje	Return from loan	—N/a	
30 Jun 2025	LW	(Croatia) Dominik Simčić	(Croatia) BSK Bijelo Brdo	Return from loan	—N/a	
5 Jul 2025	CF	(Croatia) Ante Matej Jurić	(Italy) Brescia	Transfer	Free	
7 Jul 2025	CM	(Portugal) Tiago Dantas	(Croatia) Osijek	Transfer	Free	
11 Jul 2025	AM	(Croatia) Toni Fruk	(Italy) Fiorentina	Purchased percentage of future transfer	€3,500,000	
18 Jul 2025	CM	(Croatia) Damir Kreilach	(Canada) Vancouver Whitecaps	Transfer	Free	
26 Aug 2025	CF	(England) Daniel Adu-Adjei	(England) Bournemouth	Transfer	Free	
2 Sep 2025	AM	(Italy) Samuele Vignato	(Italy) Monza	Transfer	Free	
7 Jan 2026	LW	(Georgia (country)) Tornike Morchiladze	(Georgia (country)) Dinamo Tbilisi	Transfer	Free	
12 Jan 2026	AM	(Albania) Florent Shehu	(Croatia) Opatija	Transfer	Free	
14 Jan 2026	RB	(Croatia) Teo Barišić	(France) Lyon	Transfer	€400,000	
16 Jan 2026	DM	(Peru) Alfonso Barco	(Ecuador) Emelec	Transfer	Free	
19 Jan 2026	DM	(Croatia) Branko Pavić	(Croatia) Dinamo Zagreb	Transfer	€400,000	
22 Jan 2026	LB	(Ivory Coast) Dimitri Legbo	(Finland) Inter Turku	Transfer	Free	

Source: Glasilo Hrvatskog nogometnog saveza

=== Out ===
Date	Pos.	Player	Moving to	Type	Fee	Ref.
15 Jun 2025	CM	(Montenegro) Strahinja Tešović	(Montenegro) Petrovac	End of contract	Free	
17 Jun 2025	LB	(Croatia) Bruno Goda	(Croatia) Dinamo Zagreb	End of contract	Free	
27 Jun 2025	CM	(Albania) Lindon Selahi	(Poland) Widzew Łódź	End of contract	Free	
1 Jul 2025	LW	(France) Naïs Djouahra	(Portugal) Arouca	End of contract	Free	
2 Jul 2025	GK	(Croatia) Josip Posavec	(Croatia) Lokomotiva Zagreb	Released (mutual consent)	Free	
4 Jul 2025	CF	(Serbia) Komnen Andrić	(Georgia (country)) Torpedo Kutaisi	Loan (until 31/12/2026; buying obligation)	—N/a	
29 Jul 2025	DM	(Croatia) Andro Babić	(Bosnia and Herzegovina) Velež Mostar	Released (mutual consent)	Free	
29 Jul 2025	CF	(Croatia) Dominik Dogan	(Bosnia and Herzegovina) Velež Mostar	Loan (until 30/6/2026)	—N/a	
8 Aug 2025	CB	(Croatia) Bruno Burčul	(Croatia) Orijent	Dual registration	—N/a	
8 Aug 2025	CB	(Croatia) Roko Valinčić	(Croatia) Orijent	Dual registration	—N/a	
8 Aug 2025	AM	(Croatia) Borna Panić	(Croatia) Orijent	Dual registration	—N/a	
8 Aug 2025	CF	(The Gambia) Cherno Saho	(Croatia) Orijent	Dual registration	—N/a	
11 Aug 2025	GK	(Nigeria) David Nwolokor	(Croatia) Opatija	Dual registration	—N/a	
11 Aug 2025	CM	(Croatia) Rajan Žlibanović	(Croatia) Opatija	Dual registration	—N/a	
12 Aug 2025	GK	(Croatia) Domagoj Ivan Marić	(Croatia) Karlovac 1919	Loan (until 26/6/2026)	—N/a	
12 Aug 2025	CB	(Croatia) Petar Raguž	(Croatia) Karlovac 1919	Loan (until 26/6/2026)	—N/a	
12 Aug 2025	LW	(Croatia) Dominik Simčić	(Croatia) Karlovac 1919	Loan (until 26/6/2026)	—N/a	
14 Aug 2025	GK	(Croatia) Josip Jurčević	(Croatia) Grobničan	Dual registration	—N/a	
14 Aug 2025	RW	(North Macedonia) Matej Momčilovski	(Croatia) Grobničan	Dual registration	—N/a	
19 Aug 2025	CB	(North Macedonia) Jovan Manev	(Serbia) Novi Pazar	Loan (until 30/6/2026; option to buy)	—N/a	
22 Aug 2025	GK	(Croatia) Niko Vučetić	(Croatia) Opatija	Dual registration	—N/a	
28 Aug 2025	RW	(Montenegro) Nikola Medojević	(Croatia) Orijent	Dual registration	—N/a	
5 Sep 2025	CB	(Croatia) Lovro Kitin	(Croatia) Grobničan	Dual registration	—N/a	
5 Sep 2025	RW	(Croatia) Dominik Thaqi	(Croatia) Grobničan	Dual registration	—N/a	
4 Jan 2026	RW	(Croatia) Šimun Butić	(Croatia) Vukovar 1991	Loan (until 30/6/2026)	—N/a	
10 Jan 2026	CM	(Bosnia and Herzegovina) Silvio Ilinković	(Croatia) Varaždin	Released (mutual consent)	Free	
15 Jan 2026	AM	(Croatia) Borna Panić	(Slovenia) Jesenice	Released (mutual consent)	Free	
15 Jan 2026	AM	(Bulgaria) Dominik Yankov	(Bulgaria) Lokomotiv Sofia	Loan (until 30/6/2026)	—N/a	
16 Jan 2026	CM	(Croatia) Damir Kreilach	—N/a	Retirement	—N/a	
16 Jan 2026	RW	(Montenegro) Nikola Medojević	(Montenegro) Budućnost Podgorica	Released (mutual consent)	Free	
19 Jan 2026	RW	(Montenegro) Omar Sijarić	(Bosnia and Herzegovina) Borac Banja Luka	Released (mutual consent)	Free	
4 Feb 2026	LW	(Bosnia and Herzegovina) Luka Menalo	(Bosnia and Herzegovina) Sarajevo	Released (mutual consent)	Free	
5 Feb 2026	RW	(Croatia) Bruno Bogojević	(Croatia) Gorica	Transfer	Undisclosed	
5 Feb 2026	AM	(Croatia) Niko Janković	(Slovakia) Slovan Bratislava	Loan (until 31/1/2027; option to buy)	—N/a	
10 Feb 2026	AM	(Albania) Florent Shehu	(Croatia) Opatija	Dual registration	—N/a	
12 Feb 2026	CF	(The Gambia) Cherno Saho	(Croatia) Opatija	Dual registration	—N/a	
13 Feb 2026	CF	(The Gambia) Alasana Samateh	(Croatia) Grobničan	Dual registration	—N/a	

Source: Glasilo Hrvatskog nogometnog saveza

Spending: ▼€5,050,000
Income: ▲€0
Expenditure: ▼€5,050,000
