= 2026 Croatian Football Cup final =

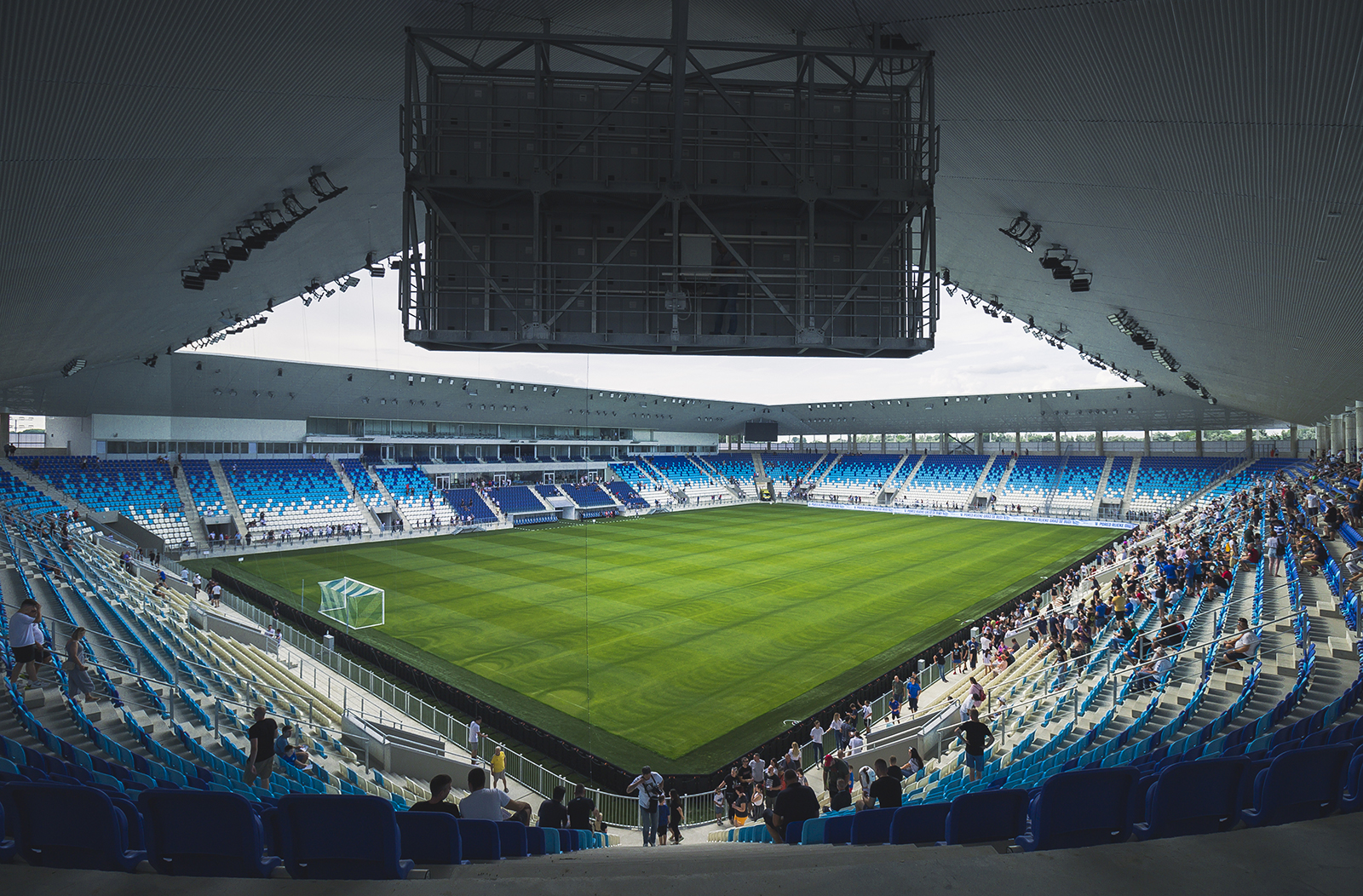
- Opus Arena in Osijek hosted the final
- Event: 2025–26 Croatian Cup
Dinamo Zagreb	Rijeka
2	0
- Date: 13 May 2026
- Venue: Opus Arena, Osijek
- Referee: Mateo Erceg (Benkovac)
- Attendance: 11,055

The 2026 Croatian Cup final between Dinamo Zagreb and Rijeka was played on 13 May 2026 in Osijek.

Dinamo Zagreb won the trophy with a result of 2–0. This was the first one-legged final since 2023.

== Road to the final ==
Dinamo Zagreb		Round	Rijeka	
Opponent	Result		Opponent	Result
bye		Preliminary round	bye	
Dinamo Predavac	6–0	First round	Maksimir	4–0
Karlovac 1919	7−0	Second round	Mladost Ždralovi	4–1
Kurilovec	2–0	Quarter-finals	Hajduk Split	3–2
Gorica	6–3	Semi-finals	Slaven Belupo	2–0

== Match details ==
13 May 2026
18:00

Dinamo Zagreb	2–0	Rijeka
Stojković 50', 57'	Report

Opus Arena, Osijek
Attendance: 11,055
Referee: Mateo Erceg (Benkovac)

Dinamo Zagreb	Rijeka

GK	40	(Croatia) Dominik Livaković
CB	25	(Croatia) Moris Valinčić		(substituted off) 83'
CB	36	(Spain) Sergi Domínguez
LB	26	(Scotland) Scott McKenna
CB	3	(Croatia) Bruno Goda	(yellow card) 90+3'
RM	7	(Croatia) Luka Stojković
CM	27	(Croatia) Josip Mišić (c)
LM	8	(Slovenia) Miha Zajc		(substituted off) 73'
RF	71	(Algeria) Monsef Bakrar		(substituted off) 63'
CF	9	(Croatia) Dion Drena Beljo
LF	10	(Croatia) Gabriel Vidović		(substituted off) 63'
Substitutes:
GK	44	(Croatia) Ivan Filipović
DF	15	(Croatia) Niko Galešić		(substituted on) 83'
DF	22	(Sweden) Matteo Pérez Vinlöf
DF	13	(Philippines) Paul Tabinas
MF	4	(Algeria) Ismaël Bennacer		(substituted on) 73'
MF	14	(Croatia) Marko Soldo
FW	11	(Albania) Arbër Hoxha		(substituted on) 63'
FW	21	(Croatia) Mateo Lisica		(substituted on) 63'
FW	30	(Croatia) Fran Topić
Manager:
(Croatia) Mario Kovačević

GK	13	(Bosnia and Herzegovina) Martin Zlomislić (c)
RB	22	(Croatia) Ante Oreč
CB	45	(Croatia) Ante Majstorović	(yellow card) 83'
CB	6	(Bosnia and Herzegovina) Stjepan Radeljić
LB	34	(Serbia) Mladen Devetak		(substituted off) 84'
CM	66	(Croatia) Branko Pavić
CM	55	(Peru) Alfonso Barco		(substituted off) 73'
RW	14	(Bosnia and Herzegovina) Amer Gojak
AM	26	(Portugal) Tiago Dantas
LW	10	(Croatia) Toni Fruk		(substituted off) 73'
CF	18	(England) Daniel Adu-Adjei
Substitutes:
GK	99	(Serbia) Aleksa Todorović
DF	24	(Ivory Coast) Dimitri Legbo		(substituted on) 84'
DF	91	(Croatia) Noel Bodetić
MF	8	(Slovenia) Dejan Petrovič
MF	19	(Italy) Samuele Vignato		(substituted on) 73'
MF	20	(Republic of the Congo) Merveil Ndockyt
MF	23	(Lithuania) Justas Lasickas
FW	9	(Croatia) Duje Čop		(substituted on) 73'
FW	77	(Croatia) Ante Matej Jurić
Manager:
(Spain) Víctor Sánchez

Assistant referees:
Alen Jakšić (Split)
Stipe Brajković (Šibenik)
Fourth official:
Ivan Vukančić (Benkovac)
Video assistant referee:
Mario Zebec (Cestica)
Assistant video assistant referee:
Tihomir Pejin (Donji Miholjac)

Match rules

- 90 minutes.
- Nine named substitutes.
- Maximum of five substitutions.
