= 2025 Croatian Football Cup final =

- Event: 2024–25 Croatian Cup
Slaven Belupo	Rijeka
1	2

First leg
Slaven Belupo	Rijeka
1	1
- Date: 14 May 2025
- Venue: Gradski stadion Ivan Kušek-Apaš, Koprivnica
- Referee: Patrik Kolarić (Čakovec)
- Attendance: 4,448

Second leg
Rijeka	Slaven Belupo
1	0
- Date: 29 May 2025
- Venue: Stadion Rujevica, Rijeka
- Referee: Dario Bel (Osijek)
- Attendance: 8,181

The 2025 Croatian Cup Final was a two-legged affair played between Slaven Belupo and Rijeka. The first leg was played on 14 May 2025, and the second leg was played on 29 May 2025.

Rijeka won the trophy with an aggregate result of 2–1.

== Road to the final ==
Slaven Belupo		Round	Rijeka	
Opponent	Result		Opponent	Result
Bye		Preliminary round	Bye	
Kustošija	1–0	First round	Neretvanac Opuzen	3–1
Šibenik	2–1	Second round	Bednja	3–0
Gorica	3–1 (aet)	Quarter-finals	Hajduk Split	3–1
Osijek	0–0 (4–3 p)	Semi-finals	Istra 1961	1–0

== First leg ==
14 May 2025
18:00

Slaven Belupo	1–1	Rijeka
Bosec 69'	Report	Fruk 26'

Gradski stadion Ivan Kušek-Apaš, Koprivnica
Attendance: 4,448
Referee: Patrik Kolarić (Čakovec)

Slaven Belupo	Rijeka

GK	25	(Croatia) Ivan Sušak
RB	33	(Croatia) Antonio Bosec	(substituted off) 86'
CB	4	(Croatia) Dominik Kovačić
CB	6	(Croatia) Tomislav Božić (c)
LB	35	(Croatia) Luka Lučić	(substituted off) 46'
DM	15	(Croatia) Ivan Ćubelić
DM	21	(Croatia) Ljuban Crepulja	(substituted off) 46'
RW	8	(Croatia) Adriano Jagušić	(substituted off) 89'
AM	14	(Croatia) Adrian Liber	(substituted off) 46'
LW	27	(Croatia) Alen Grgić
CF	90	(North Macedonia) Ilija Nestorovski
Substitutes:
GK	32	(Croatia) Ivan Čović
DF	3	(Croatia) Antonio Jakir	(substituted on) 46'
DF	18	(Croatia) Filip Krušelj
DF	55	(Croatia) Marco Boras
MF	7	(Bosnia and Herzegovina) Matej Šakota	(substituted on) 86'
MF	11	(Croatia) Ivan Dolček	(substituted on) 46'
MF	22	(Croatia) Ante Šuto
MF	30	(Ghana) Michael Agbekpornu	(substituted on) 46'
FW	23	(Croatia) Igor Lepinjica	(substituted on) 89'
Manager:
(Croatia) Mario Kovačević

GK	13	(Bosnia and Herzegovina) Martin Zlomislić (c)
RB	22	(Croatia) Ante Oreč
CB	6	(Bosnia and Herzegovina) Stjepan Radeljić
CB	45	(Croatia) Ante Majstorović
LB	34	(Serbia) Mladen Devetak
DM	8	(Slovenia) Dejan Petrovič
DM	18	(Albania) Lindon Selahi		(substituted off) 90+4'
RW	7	(France) Naïs Djouahra		(substituted off) 71'
AM	4	(Croatia) Niko Janković	(yellow card) 90+2'	(substituted off) 90+4'
LW	11	(Croatia) Gabriel Rukavina	(yellow card) 40'	(substituted off) 46'
CF	10	(Croatia) Toni Fruk		(substituted off) 89'
Substitutes:
GK	99	(Serbia) Aleksa Todorović
DF	3	(Croatia) Bruno Goda
DF	15	(North Macedonia) Jovan Manev
MF	14	(Bosnia and Herzegovina) Amer Gojak		(substituted on) 71'
MF	21	(Bosnia and Herzegovina) Silvio Ilinković		(substituted on) 90+4'
MF	30	(Croatia) Bruno Bogojević		(substituted on) 90+4'
FW	9	(Croatia) Duje Čop		(substituted on) 89'
FW	17	(Bosnia and Herzegovina) Luka Menalo		(substituted on) 46'
FW	27	(Croatia) Šimun Butić
Manager:
(Montenegro) Radomir Đalović

Assistant referees:
Goran Pataki (Đakovo)
Bojan Zobenica (Velika Gorica)
Fourth official:
Ante Terzić (Podstrana)
Video assistant referee:
Duje Strukan (Split)
Assistant video assistant referee:
Ante Čuljak (Zagreb)

Match rules

- 90 minutes.
- Nine named substitutes.
- Maximum of five substitutions.

== Second leg ==
29 May 2025
19:00

Rijeka	1–0	Slaven Belupo
Djouahra 60'	Report

Stadion Rujevica, Rijeka
Attendance: 8,181
Referee: Dario Bel (Osijek)

Rijeka	Slaven Belupo

GK	13	(Bosnia and Herzegovina) Martin Zlomislić (c)
RB	22	(Croatia) Ante Oreč	(yellow card) 70'
CB	6	(Bosnia and Herzegovina) Stjepan Radeljić
CB	45	(Croatia) Ante Majstorović
LB	34	(Serbia) Mladen Devetak
DM	8	(Slovenia) Dejan Petrovič
DM	18	(Albania) Lindon Selahi		(substituted off) 83'
RW	7	(France) Naïs Djouahra		(substituted off) 77'
AM	10	(Croatia) Toni Fruk		(substituted off) 89'
LW	4	(Croatia) Niko Janković		(substituted off) 83'
CF	9	(Croatia) Duje Čop	(yellow card) 86'	(substituted off) 77'
Substitutes:
GK	99	(Serbia) Aleksa Todorović
DF	3	(Croatia) Bruno Goda
DF	15	(North Macedonia) Jovan Manev
MF	14	(Bosnia and Herzegovina) Amer Gojak		(substituted on) 77'
MF	21	(Bosnia and Herzegovina) Silvio Ilinković		(substituted on) 83'
MF	30	(Croatia) Bruno Bogojević		(substituted on) 89'
FW	11	(Croatia) Gabriel Rukavina	(yellow card) 90+5'	(substituted on) 83'
FW	17	(Bosnia and Herzegovina) Luka Menalo	(yellow card) 81' (yellow-red card) 86'	(substituted on) 77'
FW	20	(Croatia) Dominik Dogan
Manager:
(Montenegro) Radomir Đalović

GK	25	(Croatia) Ivan Sušak
RB	33	(Croatia) Antonio Bosec
CB	4	(Croatia) Dominik Kovačić
CB	6	(Croatia) Tomislav Božić (c)
LB	3	(Croatia) Antonio Jakir	(yellow card) 69'
RW	14	(Croatia) Adriano Jagušić	(yellow card) 86'	(substituted off) 83'
CM	15	(Croatia) Ivan Ćubelić		(substituted off) 83'
CM	30	(Ghana) Michael Agbekpornu	(yellow card) 22'	(substituted off) 67'
LW	27	(Croatia) Alen Grgić		(substituted off) 79'
FW	23	(Croatia) Igor Lepinjica		(substituted off) 67'
CF	90	(North Macedonia) Ilija Nestorovski	(yellow card) 20'
Substitutes:
GK	32	(Croatia) Ivan Čović
DF	18	(Croatia) Filip Krušelj
DF	55	(Croatia) Marco Boras
MF	7	(Bosnia and Herzegovina) Matej Šakota		(substituted on) 83'
MF	10	(Moldova) Mihail Caimacov		(substituted on) 83'
MF	11	(Croatia) Ivan Dolček		(substituted on) 67'
MF	14	(Croatia) Adrian Liber
MF	21	(Croatia) Ljuban Crepulja		(substituted on) 67'
MF	22	(Croatia) Ante Šuto		(substituted on) 79'
Manager:
(Croatia) Mario Kovačević

Assistant referees:
Ivan Janić (Ilok)
Jerko Crnčić (Vrbovec)
Fourth official:
Zdenko Lovrić (Đakovo)
Video assistant referee:
Ivan Matić (Osijek)
Assistant video assistant referee:
Tihomir Pejin (Donji Miholjac)

Match rules

- 90 minutes.
- Penalty shoot-out if scores still level; no extra time.
- Nine named substitutes.
- Maximum of five substitutions.
