= Zlomislić =

Zlomislić is a surname. Notable people with the surname include:

- Damir Zlomislić (born 1991), Bosnian footballer
- Martin Zlomislić (born 1998), Bosnian footballer
