= Dejan Petrovic =

Dejan Petrovic may refer to:

- Dejan Petrović (born 1978), Australian-born Serbian tennis player and coach
- Dejan Petrovič (born 1998), Slovenian football player
