= Silvio Ilinković =

Bosnian footballer (born 2002)

Personal information
- Date of birth: 5 October 2002 (age 24)
- Place of birth: Nova Bila, Bosnia and Herzegovina
- Height: 1.79 m (5 ft 10 in)
- Position: Central midfielder

Team information
- Current team: Varaždin
- Number: 15

Youth career
- 2012–2015: Novi Travnik
- 2015–2016: Jardol
- 2016: Nova Bila
- 2016–2017: Romari
- 2017–2018: Široki Brijeg
- 2018–2021: Rijeka

Senior career*
Years	Team	Apps	(Gls)
2021–2022	Rijeka	0	(0)
2021–2022	→ Posušje (loan)	27	(0)
2022–2023	Zrinjski Mostar	23	(2)
2023–2025	Rijeka	23	(0)
2024	→ Zrinjski Mostar (loan)	5	(2)
2026–	Varaždin	10	(0)

International career^{‡}
2019	Bosnia and Herzegovina U17	7	(1)
2019–2020	Bosnia and Herzegovina U18	4	(0)
2020–2022	Bosnia and Herzegovina U19	4	(0)
2022–	Bosnia and Herzegovina U21	6	(0)
- * Club domestic league appearances and goals as of 15 June 2026 ‡ National team caps and goals as of 20 June 2023

Silvio Ilinković (born 5 October 2002) is a Bosnian professional footballer who plays as a midfielder for Varaždin.

== Career ==
In January 2026, Ilinković moved to NK Varaždin.

== Honours ==
Zrinjski Mostar

- Bosnian Premier League: 2022–23
- Bosnian Cup: 2022–23, 2023–24

Rijeka

- Croatian Football League: 2024–25
- Croatian Football Cup: 2024–25
