= Stjepan Radeljić =

Bosnian footballer (born 1997)

Personal information
- Date of birth: 5 September 1997 (age 29)
- Place of birth: Nova Bila, Bosnia and Herzegovina
- Height: 2.01 m (6 ft 7 in)
- Position: Centre-back

Team information
- Current team: Dinamo Zagreb
- Number: 6

Youth career
- Vitez
- 2014–2016: Zrinjski Mostar

Senior career*
Years	Team	Apps	(Gls)
2016–2018	VfB Stuttgart II	43	(2)
2018–2022	Osijek	0	(0)
2020	→ Široki Brijeg (loan)	18	(2)
2021–2022	→ Sheriff Tiraspol (loan)	24	(2)
2022–2023	Sheriff Tiraspol	24	(1)
2023–2026	Rijeka	77	(4)
2026–	Dinamo Zagreb	7	(0)

International career^{‡}
2015	Bosnia and Herzegovina U19	1	(0)
2017–2018	Bosnia and Herzegovina U21	12	(0)
2024–	Bosnia and Herzegovina	9	(0)
- * Club domestic league appearances and goals as of 8 November 2026 ‡ National team caps and goals as of 14 November 2026

Stjepan Radeljić (pronounced [stjêpan rǎdeʎitɕ]; born 5 September 1997) is a Bosnian professional footballer who plays as a centre-back for Croatian Football League club Dinamo Zagreb and the Bosnia and Herzegovina national team.

Radeljić started his professional career at VfB Stuttgart II, before joining Osijek in 2018, who loaned him to Široki Brijeg in 2020 and to Sheriff Tiraspol in 2021, with whom he signed permanently a year later. The following year, he moved to Rijeka. In 2026, he switched to Dinamo Zagreb.

A former youth international for Bosnia and Herzegovina, Radeljić made his senior international debut in 2024.

== Club career ==
=== Early career ===
Radeljić started playing football at Vitez, before joining Zrinjski Mostar's youth academy in 2014. In July 2016, he signed with German team VfB Stuttgart.

In June 2018, he moved to Croatian side Osijek. He made his professional debut in a UEFA Europa League qualifier against Petrocub on 12 July at the age of 20. In January 2020, he was sent on a six-month loan to Široki Brijeg. In July, his loan was extended for an additional season. On 29 February, he scored his first professional goal in a triumph over Mladost Doboj Kakanj.

In February 2021, Radeljić was sent on a year-long loan to Moldovan outfit Sheriff Tiraspol, with an option to make the transfer permanent, which was activated in January 2022. He debuted in the UEFA Champions League against Shakhtar Donetsk on 15 September.

=== Rijeka ===
In July 2023, Radeljić signed a three-year deal with Rijeka. He made his official debut for the squad in a UEFA Europa Conference League qualifier against Dukagjini on 27 July. On 10 August, he scored his first goal for Rijeka in a UEFA Europa Conference League qualifier against B36 Tórshavn. Two weeks later, he made his league debut against Lokomotiva. On 25 August 2024, he scored his first league goal in a defeat of Osijek. He won his first trophy with the club on 25 May 2025, when they were crowned league champions.

On 14 February 2026, he played his 100th match for the squad against Varaždin.

=== Dinamo Zagreb ===
In July, Radeljić joined Dinamo Zagreb on a contract until June 2030. He made his competitive debut for the team in a UEFA Champions League qualifier against Dukagjini on 28 July. A week later, he made his league debut against Slaven Belupo.

== International career ==
Radeljić represented Bosnia and Herzegovina at various youth levels.

In May 2024, he received his first senior call up, for friendly games against England and Italy. He debuted against the former on 3 June.

In June 2026, Radeljić was named in Bosnia and Herzegovina's squad for the 2026 FIFA World Cup. He made his tournament debut in the last group match against Qatar on 24 June.

== Career statistics ==
=== Club ===
As of match played 8 November 2026

Appearances and goals by club, season and competition
Club	Season	League			National cup (Note: Includes Croatian Cup, Bosnian Cup, Cupa Moldovei)		Continental		Other		Total	
Club	Season	Division	Apps	Goals	Apps	Goals	Apps	Goals	Apps	Goals	Apps	Goals
VfB Stuttgart II	2016–17	Regionalliga Südwest	24	2	–		–		–		24	2
VfB Stuttgart II	2017–18	Regionalliga Südwest	19	0	–		–		–		19	0
VfB Stuttgart II	Total		43	2	–		–		–		43	2
Osijek	2018–19	Croatian Football League	0	0	1	0	2 (Note: Appearances in UEFA Europa League)	0	–		3	0
Široki Brijeg (loan)	2019–20	Bosnian Premier League	3	1	1	0	–		–		4	1
Široki Brijeg (loan)	2020–21	Bosnian Premier League	15	1	1	0	–		–		16	1
Široki Brijeg (loan)	Total		18	2	2	0	–		–		20	2
Sheriff Tiraspol (loan)	2020–21	Moldovan Super Liga	12	0	3	0	–		–		15	0
Sheriff Tiraspol (loan)	2021–22	Moldovan Super Liga	12	2	1	0	7 (Note: Appearances in UEFA Champions League)	0	1 (Note: Appearance in Supercupa Moldovei)	0	21	2
Sheriff Tiraspol (loan)	Total		24	2	4	0	7	0	1	0	36	2
Sheriff Tiraspol	2021–22	Moldovan Super Liga	6	0	1	0	2	0	–		9	0
Sheriff Tiraspol	2022–23	Moldovan Super Liga	18	1	4	0	16 (Note: Five appearances in UEFA Champions League; seven appearances in UEFA Europa League; four appearances in UEFA Conference League)	0	–		38	1
Sheriff Tiraspol	Total		24	1	5	0	18	0	–		47	1
Rijeka	2023–24	Croatian Football League	25	0	6	0	5 (Note: Appearances in UEFA Conference League)	1	–		36	1
Rijeka	2024–25	Croatian Football League	27	2	5	1	5 (Note: Four appearances in UEFA Europa League; one appearance in UEFA Conference League)	0	–		37	3
Rijeka	2025–26	Croatian Football League	25	2	4	0	13 (Note: Two appearances in UEFA Champions League; four appearances in UEFA Europa League; seven appearances in UEFA Conference League)	0	–		42	2
Rijeka	Total		77	4	15	1	23	1	–		115	6
Dinamo Zagreb	2026–27	Croatian Football League	7	0	1	0	3 (Note: One appearance in UEFA Champions League, two appearances in UEFA Europa League)	0	–		11	0
Career total			193	11	28	1	53	1	1	0	275	13

=== International ===
As of match played 14 November 2026

Appearances and goals by national team and year
National team	Year	Apps	Goals
Bosnia and Herzegovina
Bosnia and Herzegovina	2024	1	0
Bosnia and Herzegovina	2025	3	0
Bosnia and Herzegovina	2026	5	0
Total		9	0

== Honours ==
Sheriff Tiraspol

- Moldovan Super Liga: 2020–21, 2021–22, 2022–23
- Cupa Moldovei: 2021–22, 2022–23

Rijeka

- Croatian Football League: 2024–25
- Croatian Cup: 2024–25
