= Antonio Bosec =

Croatian footballer (born 1997)

Personal information
- Date of birth: 28 August 1997 (age 29)
- Place of birth: Zagreb, Croatia
- Height: 1.78 m (5 ft 10 in)
- Position: Full-back

Team information
- Current team: NK Radomlje
- Number: 2

Youth career
- Tondach Bedekovčina
- –2016: Inter Zaprešić

Senior career*
Years	Team	Apps	(Gls)
2016–2021	Inter Zaprešić	134	(3)
2021–2025	Slaven Belupo	137	(1)
2025	CFR Cluj	1	(0)
2026	Vukovar 1991	10	(0)
2026–	NK Radomlje	13	(2)

International career^{‡}
2017	Croatia U21	1	(0)
2018	Croatia U20	1	(0)
- * Club domestic league appearances and goals as of 08:46, 3 November 2026 (UTC) ‡ National team caps and goals as of 08:46, 3 November 2026 (UTC)

Antonio Bosec (born 28 August 1997) is a Croatian footballer who plays as a full-back for 1. SNL side NK Radomlje.

== Career ==
Bosec began his career at Tondach Bedekovčina, before joining Inter Zaprešić, making his debut with the club in 2016. In January 2021, he signed for Slaven Belupo. During a match against Hajduk Split in October 2024, Bosec suffered a concussion after being kicked in the head by Ismaël Diallo during their goal. Despite protests from his teammates, the video assistant referee ruled there was no foul. On 14 May 2025, Bosec scored in the first leg of the 2025 Croatian Football Cup final against Rijeka. Roughly one month later, it was announced that Bosec would leave the club after four and a half years.

On 7 June 2025, Bosec signed for Romanian club CFR Cluj. He only played six matches overall for the club, including one in the Liga I, before the club terminated his contract two months later after a poor performance in a 7–2 defeat against BK Häcken in the 2025–26 UEFA Conference League play-offs. Despite interest from Dinamo Zagreb, he returned to Croatia with Vukovar 1991 on 24 February 2026.

In July 2026, he signed for Slovenian PrvaLiga side Radomlje.
