= Dimitri Legbo =

Ivorian footballer (born 2001)

Personal information
- Full name: Christian Dimitri Legbo Ouguehi
- Date of birth: 30 August 2001 (age 25)
- Place of birth: Daloa, Ivory Coast
- Height: 1.75 m (5 ft 9 in)
- Position: Left winger

Team information
- Current team: Zira

Senior career*
Years	Team	Apps	(Gls)
2019–2021	RC Abidjan	6	(0)
2021–2023	Ararat Yerevan	31	(0)
2023–2025	Inter Turku	79	(14)
2026	Rijeka	14	(0)
2026–	Zira	0	(0)

International career^{‡}
2022	Ivory Coast U23		
- * Club domestic league appearances and goals as of 3 September 2026 ‡ National team caps and goals as of 4 October 2023

Christian Dimitri Legbo Ouguehi (born 30 August 2001) is an Ivorian professional footballer who plays as a Left winger for Zira in Azerbaijan.

== Club career ==
Legbo started his playing career in his native Ivory Coast with RC Abidjan, before moving to Armenia and signing with Ararat Yerevan in September 2021.

On 11 February 2023, Inter Turku in Finland announced that they had reached an agreement with Ararat to acquire Legbo for an undisclosed fee. He initially signed a two-year deal with Inter, with an option for a further year. On 3 October 2024, his option was exercised.

On 19 October 2025, Legbo scored a brace for Inter in two minutes, including the winning goal in a 2–1 home win over Ilves, after Inter had trailed 1–0.

Legbo signed a 2.5-year contract with Rijeka on 22 January 2026, which also includes a one-year extension option.

== International career ==
On 15 October 2022, Legbo got a call-up to the Ivory Coast U23 national team for the 2023 U-23 Africa Cup of Nations qualification match against Niger U23, but he remained an unused substitute.

== Career statistics ==
As of 23 May 2026

Appearances and goals by club, season and competition
Club	Season	League			National cup (Note: Includes Armenian Cup, Finnish Cup, Croatian Cup)		League cup (Note: Includes Finnish League Cup)		Continental		Total	
Club	Season	Division	Apps	Goals	Apps	Goals	Apps	Goals	Apps	Goals	Apps	Goals
RC Abidjan	2020–21	Ivorian Ligue 1	6	0	0	0	—		6 (Note: Includes CAF Champions League and CAF Confederation Cup)	0	12	0
Ararat Yerevan	2021–22	Armenian Premier League	16	0	1	1	—		—		17	1
Ararat Yerevan	2022–23	Armenian Premier League	15	0	1	0	—		2 (Note: Includes UEFA Europa Conference League)	0	18	0
Ararat Yerevan	Total		31	0	2	1	0	0	2	0	35	1
Inter Turku	2023	Veikkausliiga	24	0	1	0	4	0	—		29	0
Inter Turku	2024	Veikkausliiga	26	2	4	0	3	0	—		33	2
Inter Turku	2025	Veikkausliiga	29	12	1	0	7	3	—		37	15
Inter Turku	Total		79	14	6	0	14	3	0	0	99	17
Rijeka	2025–26	HNL	14	0	2	1	—		—		16	1
Career total			130	14	10	2	15	3	8	0	163	19

== Honours ==
Inter Turku

- Finnish Cup runner-up: 2024
- Finnish League Cup: 2024, 2025

Individual

- Veikkausliiga Player of Month: October 2025
