= Pará (footballer, born 2002) =

Brazilian footballer

Personal information
- Full name: Luis Felipe Rebelo Costa
- Date of birth: 18 February 2002 (age 24)
- Place of birth: Marituba, Brazil
- Height: 1.80 m (5 ft 11 in)
- Position: Midfielder

Team information
- Current team: Primorje
- Number: 26

Youth career
- 2017–2022: Juventude
- 2019: → Bahia (loan)
- 2020: → Bahia (loan)

Senior career*
Years	Team	Apps	(Gls)
2022–2024	Juventude	4	(0)
2023	→ Santo André (loan)	10	(0)
2024–2025	Amazonas	17	(0)
2025–	Primorje	3	(0)
- * Club domestic league appearances and goals as of 20 September 2025

Luis Felipe Rabelo Costa (born 18 February 2002), commonly known as Pará, is a Brazilian footballer who plays as a midfielder for Primorje.

== Club career ==
Pará was born in Marituba, Pará, and joined Juventude's youth setup in 2017, aged fifteen. In the 2019 and 2020 seasons, he also spent time on loan with the under-20 side of Bahia.

Upon returning, Pará featured for the under-20 and under-23 squads of Ju before making his first team – and Série A – debut on 29 August 2022, by coming on as a second-half substitute for Elton in a 4–0 away loss against Internacional.

== Career statistics ==
As of 22 February 2024

Club	Season	League			State League		Cup		Continental		Other		Total	
Club	Season	Division	Apps	Goals	Apps	Goals	Apps	Goals	Apps	Goals	Apps	Goals	Apps	Goals
Juventude	2022	Série A	3	0	0	0	0	0	—		—		3	0
Juventude	2023	Série B	0	0	0	0	0	0	—		—		0	0
Juventude	2024	Série A	0	0	1	0	0	0	—		—		1	0
Juventude	Total		3	0	1	0	0	0	—		—		4	0
Santo André (loan)	2023	Série D	10	0	—		—		—		—		10	0
Career total			13	0	1	0	0	0	0	0	0	0	14	0
