= Alfonso Barco =

Peruvian footballer (born 2001)

Personal information
- Full name: Alfonso Daniel Barco Del Solar
- Date of birth: 7 December 2001 (age 24)
- Place of birth: Lima, Peru
- Height: 1.88 m (6 ft 2 in)
- Position: Midfielder

Team information
- Current team: Rijeka
- Number: 5

Youth career
- –2018: Sporting Cristal
- 2018–2019: Universidad San Martín

Senior career*
Years	Team	Apps	(Gls)
2019–2021	Universidad San Martín	40	(0)
2019	→ César Vallejo (loan)	0	(0)
2022–2025	Universitario	38	(0)
2023–2025	→ Defensor Sporting (loan)	45	(1)
2025–2026	Emelec	22	(1)
2026–	Rijeka	20	(0)

International career^{‡}
2020	Peru U-20	1	(0)
2025–	Peru	7	(0)
- * Club domestic league appearances and goals as of 22:24, 20 September 2026 (UTC) ‡ National team caps and goals as of 23:13, 6 October 2026 (UTC)

Alfonso Daniel Barco del Solar (born 7 December 2001) is a Peruvian footballer who plays as a midfielder for Rijeka in the Croatian Football League and the Peru national team.

== Club career ==
=== Universidad San Martín ===
Barco took his first steps in football in Sporting Cristal, before joining Universidad San Martín in 2018, where he shortly after became an established player on the club's reserve team. He made his official debut in the Peruvian Primera División for San Martín on 10 June 2019 against Ayacucho FC.

Shortly after, in July 2019, he was loaned to César Vallejo for the rest of the year to gain some experience. However, he was never used on the first team but became a key player on the club's reserve team, being one of the players who played the most minutes.

Barco was officially promoted to the club's first team for the 2020 season when he returned from his loan spell. On 3 December 2021 Universitario de Deportes confirmed that Barco would join the club from the 2022 season on a deal until the end of 2023.

In August 2023, Barco joined Uruguayan Primera División side Defensor Sporting on a loan deal until the end of June 2024. On August 1, 2024, the loan was extended for another year.

== Personal life ==
Alfonso Barco is the son of former professional footballer, Alvaro Barco, and nephew of José del Solar.

== Career statistics ==
=== Club ===
As of match played 20 September 2026

Appearances and goals by club, season and competition
Club	Season	League			National cup		Continental		Other		Total	
Club	Season	Division	Apps	Goals	Apps	Goals	Apps	Goals	Apps	Goals	Apps	Goals
Universidad San Martín	2019	Liga 1	1	0	0	0	—		—		1	0
Universidad San Martín	2020	Liga 1	14	0	0	0	—		—		14	0
Universidad San Martín	2021	Liga 1	24	0	0	0	—		—		24	0
Universidad San Martín	Total		39	0	0	0	—		—		39	0
César Vallejo (loan)	2019	Liga 1	0	0	—		—		—		0	0
Universitario	2022	Liga 1	25	0	0	0	0	0	—		25	0
Universitario	2023	Liga 1	13	0	0	0	7 (Note: Appearances in Copa Sudamericana)	0	—		20	0
Universitario	Total		38	0	0	0	7	0	—		45	0
Defensor Sporting (loan)	2023	Liga AUF Uruguaya	8	1	3	0	—		—		11	1
Defensor Sporting (loan)	2024	Liga AUF Uruguaya	23	1	5	2	1 (Note: Appearance in Copa Libertadores)	0	1 (Note: Appearance in Supercopa Uruguaya)	0	29	3
Defensor Sporting (loan)	2025	Liga AUF Uruguaya	14	0	0	0	1	0	—		15	0
Defensor Sporting (loan)	Total		45	2	8	2	2	0	1	0	56	4
Emelec	2025	LigaPro Serie A	22	1	3	1	—		—		25	2
Rijeka	2025–26	Croatian Football League	15	0	3	0	4 (Note: Appearances in UEFA Conference League)	0	—		22	0
Rijeka	2026–27	Croatian Football League	5	0	1	0	5	0	—		11	0
Rijeka	Total		20	0	4	0	9	0	—		33	0
Career total			156	2	12	3	18	0	1	0	186	5

=== International ===
As of match played 6 October 2026

Appearances and goals by national team and year
National team	Year	Apps	Goals
Peru	2025	1	0
Peru	2026	6	0
Total		7	0

== Honours ==
Defensor Sporting

- Copa Uruguay: 2023, 2024
