= Dejan Petrovič =

Slovenian footballer (born 1998)

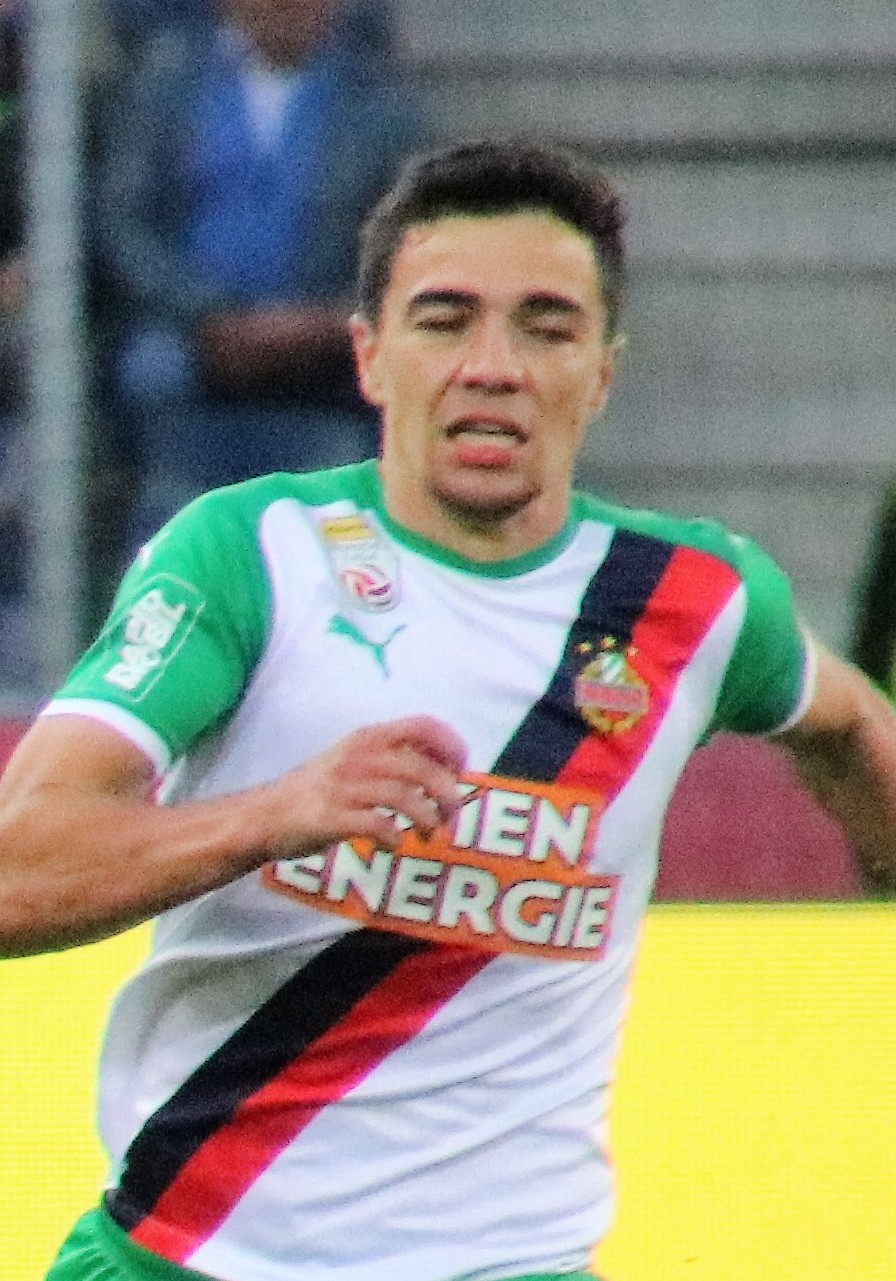
- Petrovič with Rapid Wien in 2021

Personal information
- Date of birth: 12 January 1998 (age 28)
- Place of birth: Rače, Slovenia
- Height: 1.79 m (5 ft 10 in)
- Position: Midfielder

Team information
- Current team: Johor Darul Ta'zim
- Number: 21

Youth career
- 2003–2008: Rače
- 2008–2017: Aluminij

Senior career*
Years	Team	Apps	(Gls)
2015–2020	Aluminij	117	(5)
2020–2023	Rapid Wien	63	(0)
2020	Rapid Wien II	1	(0)
2023–2026	Rijeka	74	(2)
2026–	Johor Darul Ta'zim	1	(0)

International career
2014–2015	Slovenia U17 (Note: Official competitive UEFA matches only)	8	(0)
2016	Slovenia U19	1	(0)
2018–2021	Slovenia U21	12	(2)
2019	Slovenia B	1	(0)
2020–2025	Slovenia	13	(0)
- * Club domestic league appearances and goals as of 21 August 2026

Dejan Petrovič (born 12 January 1998) is a Slovenian footballer who plays as a midfielder for Malaysia Super League club Johor Darul Ta'zim.

== Club career ==
Petrovič made his professional debut in the Slovenian PrvaLiga for Aluminij on 23 July 2016 in a game against Koper.

== International career ==
Petrovič made his senior debut for Slovenia on 7 October 2020 in a friendly against San Marino.

== Personal life ==
Petrovič hails from a small settlement of Rače, a few kilometers south of Maribor. In an interview, he stated that his family name Petrovič has been erroneously misspelled as Petrović on numerous occasion.

== Career statistics ==
=== Club ===
As of 23 May 2026

Appearances and goals by club, season and competition
Club	Season	League			National cup		Continental		Total	
Club	Season	Division	Apps	Goals	Apps	Goals	Apps	Goals	Apps	Goals
Aluminij	2014–15	Slovenian Second League	1	0	—		—		1	0
Aluminij	2015–16	Slovenian Second League	12	2	—		—		12	2
Aluminij	2016–17	Slovenian PrvaLiga	18	0	3	0	—		21	0
Aluminij	2017–18	Slovenian PrvaLiga	33	0	7	0	—		40	0
Aluminij	2018–19	Slovenian PrvaLiga	33	3	5	0	—		38	3
Aluminij	2019–20	Slovenian PrvaLiga	20	0	2	0	—		22	0
Aluminij	Total		117	5	17	0	—		134	5
Rapid Wien	2019–20	Austrian Bundesliga	14	0	—		—		14	0
Rapid Wien	2020–21	Austrian Bundesliga	24	0	3	0	3 (Note: Two appearances in UEFA Champions League, one appearance in UEFA Europa League)	0	30	0
Rapid Wien	2021–22	Austrian Bundesliga	21	0	3	0	10 (Note: Two appearances in UEFA Champions League, six appearances in UEFA Europa League, two appearances in UEFA Europa Conference League)	0	34	0
Rapid Wien	2022–23	Austrian Bundesliga	4	0	0	0	0	0	4	0
Rapid Wien	Total		63	0	6	0	13	0	82	0
Rijeka	2023–24	Croatian Football League	20	0	4	0	0	0	24	0
Rijeka	2024–25	Croatian Football League	34	1	4	0	6 (Note: Four appearances and one goal in UEFA Europa League, two appearances in UEFA Conference League)	1	44	2
Rijeka	2025–26	Croatian Football League	20	1	0	0	12 (Note: Two appearances in UEFA Champions League, three appearances in UEFA Europa League, seven appearances and one goal in UEFA Conference League)	1	32	2
Rijeka	Total		74	2	8	0	18	2	100	4
Career total			254	7	31	0	31	2	316	9

== Honours ==
Rijeka

- Croatian Football League: 2024–25
- Croatian Cup: 2024–25

Johor Darul Ta'zim

- Piala Sumbangsih: 2026
