= Ante Oreč =

Croatian footballer (born 2001)

Personal information
- Date of birth: 29 August 2001 (age 25)
- Place of birth: Dubrovnik, Croatia
- Height: 1.81 m (5 ft 11 in)
- Position: Right back

Team information
- Current team: Rijeka
- Number: 22

Youth career
- 2013–2018: GOŠK Dubrovnik
- 2018–2020: Lokomotiva Zagreb

Senior career*
| Years | Team | Apps | (Gls) |
| 2020–2021 | Lokomotiva Zagreb | 0 | (0) |
| 2020–2021 | → Hrvatski Dragovoljac (loan) | 24 | (0) |
| 2021–2022 | Sesvete | 25 | (0) |
| 2022–2023 | Kustošija | 28 | (0) |
| 2023–2025 | Velež Mostar | 44 | (1) |
| 2025– | Rijeka | 37 | (2) |

International career^{‡}
| 2020 | Croatia U19 | 4 | (0) |
- * Club domestic league appearances and goals as of 23 May 2026 ‡ National team caps and goals as of 16 April 2025

Ante Oreč (born 29 August 2001) is a Croatian professional footballer who plays as a right back for Rijeka.

== Club career ==
In February 2025, Ante joined Croatian club, Rijeka, from Velež Mostar.

== Honours ==
Rijeka

- Croatian Football League: 2024–25
- Croatian Football Cup: 2024–25
