= Mladen Devetak =

Serbian football defender

Personal information
- Date of birth: 12 March 1999 (age 27)
- Place of birth: Novi Sad, FR Yugoslavia
- Height: 1.83 m (6 ft 0 in)
- Positions: Centre-back; left-back

Team information
- Current team: Rijeka
- Number: 34

Youth career
- Vojvodina

Senior career*
Years	Team	Apps	(Gls)
2017–2022	Vojvodina	97	(1)
2018	→ ČSK Čelarevo (loan)	14	(2)
2018	→ Kabel (loan)	15	(3)
2022–2024	Palermo	6	(0)
2023	→ Viterbese (loan)	17	(1)
2023–2024	→ Istra 1961 (loan)	30	(0)
2024–	Rijeka	60	(2)

International career
2015	Serbia U16	3	(0)
2015–2016	Serbia U17	11	(0)
2017	Serbia U18	3	(0)
2018	Serbia U19	2	(0)
2019	Serbia U21	3	(0)
- * Club domestic league appearances and goals as of 23 May 2026

Mladen Devetak (Serbian Cyrillic: Младен Деветак; born 12 March 1999) is a Serbian football defender who plays for HNK Rijeka.

== Club career ==
=== Vojvodina ===
Born in Novi Sad, Devetak passed Vojvodina youth school. He made an official debut for Vojvodina in the 37th fixture of the 2016–17 Serbian SuperLiga season, played on 21 May 2017 against Javor Ivanjica. In June 2017, Devetak signed his first professional contract, penning a four-year deal with the club.

=== Palermo and loan to Viterbese ===
On 5 August 2022, the newly-promoted Italian Serie B club Palermo announced the signing of Devetak on a three-year contract. He made six appearances with the Rosanero before being loaned out to Serie C club Viterbese on 4 January 2023.

On 13 July 2023, Palermo announced to have loaned out Devetak to Croatian side NK Istra 1961, with an option to sign the player permanently at the end of the season.

On 2 August 2024, Palermo confirmed the sale of Devetak to HNK Rijeka.

== International career ==
Devetak was a member of a U19 national team.

== Career statistics ==
As of 29 October 2022

Club	Season	League			Cup		Continental		Total	
Club	Season	Division	Apps	Goals	Apps	Goals	Apps	Goals	Apps	Goals
Vojvodina	2016–17	Serbian SuperLiga	1	0	0	0	0	0	1	0
Vojvodina	2017–18	Serbian SuperLiga	2	0	0	0	0	0	2	0
Vojvodina	2018–19	Serbian SuperLiga	14	0	1	0	–		15	0
Vojvodina	2019–20	Serbian SuperLiga	21	1	2	0	–		23	1
Vojvodina	2020–21	Serbian SuperLiga	30	0	2	0	0	0	32	0
Vojvodina	2021–22	Serbian SuperLiga	29	0	1	0	4	0	34	0
Vojvodina	Total		97	1	6	0	4	0	107	1
ČSK Čelarevo (loan)	2017–18	Serbian First League	14	2	0	0	–		14	2
Kabel (loan)	2018–19	Serbian League Vojvodina	15	3	0	0	–		15	3
Palermo	2022–23	Serie B	2	0	0	0	–		2	0
Career total			128	6	6	0	4	0	138	6

== Honours ==
Vojvodina

- Serbian Cup: 2019–20

Rijeka

- Croatian Football League: 2024–25
- Croatian Football Cup: 2024–25
