= Daniel Adu-Adjei =

English footballer (born 2005)

Personal information
- Full name: Daniel William Kwabena Adu-Adjei
- Date of birth: 21 June 2005 (age 21)
- Place of birth: Hammersmith, England
- Height: 1.77 m (5 ft 10 in)
- Position: Forward

Team information
- Current team: Rijeka
- Number: 18

Youth career
- Brentford
- –2021: Fulham
- 2021–2023: Bournemouth

Senior career*
Years	Team	Apps	(Gls)
2023–2025	Bournemouth	0	(0)
2023	→ Poole Town (loan)	11	(1)
2024	→ Leyton Orient (loan)	10	(1)
2024–2025	→ Carlisle United (loan)	17	(2)
2025–	Rijeka	34	(10)

International career^{‡}
2026–	Ghana U23	1	(0)
- * Club domestic league appearances and goals as of 10:49, 21 September 2026 (UTC) ‡ National team caps and goals as of 12:55, 13 November 2026 (UTC)

Daniel William Kwabena Adu-Adjei (born 21 June 2005) is a professional footballer who plays as a forward for Croatian club Rijeka. Born in England, he represents Ghana internationally.

== Early life ==
Born in England, he has Ghanaian heritage. Adu-Adjei played football as a youngster in the London Borough of Brent.

== Club career ==
Adu-Adjei joined the Bournemouth academy in March 2021, following spells with the Brentford and Fulham academies. He began to be integrated into the Bournemouth first-squad during the 2022–23 season and was an unused substitute in the clubs Premier League fixtures on occasion. He also played on loan at Poole Town from February 2023. He signed a first professional contract with Bournemouth in February 2023. He started the 2023–24 season playing for the Bournemouth U21 side in the Premier League Cup, and the Professional Development League. He made his professional debut playing for Bournemouth in the FA Cup third round, on 6 January 2024, away against Queens Park Rangers in a 3–2 win. On 5 June 2024, he signed a new long-term contract with Bournemouth.

On 1 August 2024, Adu-Adjei joined League Two side Carlisle United on a season-long loan deal. He was recalled in January 2025.

On 26 August 2025, Adu-Adjei joined Croatian Football League side Rijeka on a four-year deal.

== International career ==
In November 2026, Adu-Adjei was called-up for the first time for the Ghana national under-23 football team.

== Personal life ==
Born in London, to Ghanaian parents, Adu-Adjei holds dual British and Ghanaian citizenship.

== Career statistics ==
As of 7 January 2024.

Appearances and goals by club, season and competition
Club	Season	League			FA Cup		League Cup		Other		Total	
Club	Season	Division	Apps	Goals	Apps	Goals	Apps	Goals	Apps	Goals	Apps	Goals
Bournemouth	2023–24	Premier League	0	0	1	0	0	0	0	0	1	0
Career total			0	0	1	0	0	0	0	0	1	0
