= Marco Boras =

Croatian footballer

Personal information
- Date of birth: 28 September 2001 (age 25)
- Place of birth: Frankfurt, Germany
- Height: 1.99 m (6 ft 6 in)
- Position: Defender

Team information
- Current team: WSG Tirol
- Number: 23

Youth career
- 2006–2011: SC Goldstein
- 2011–2013: JFC Frankfurt
- 2013–2016: Eintracht Frankfurt
- 2016–2017: Darmstadt 98
- 2017–2020: Kickers Offenbach

Senior career*
Years	Team	Apps	(Gls)
2020–2021	FC Gießen	37	(2)
2021–2022	TSG Hoffenheim II	18	(0)
2022–2025	Slaven Belupo	61	(2)
2025–	WSG Tirol	30	(2)

International career^{‡}
2020	Croatia U19	3	(1)
- * Club domestic league appearances and goals as of 10 June 2026 ‡ National team caps and goals as of 24 December 2023

Marco Boras (born 28 September 2001) is a Croatian footballer who plays as a defender for WSG Tirol.

== Club career ==
Born in Frankfurt, Boras played for TSG Hoffenheim II and FC Gießen before joining Slaven Belupo in August 2022. In his first season he played limited minutes, but scored a game-winning goal against Osijek. In his second season with Slaven Belupo, he became a starter under new coach Roy Ferenčina.

ON 15 July 2025, Boras joined WSG Tirol.
