= Tiago Dantas =

Portuguese footballer (born 2000)

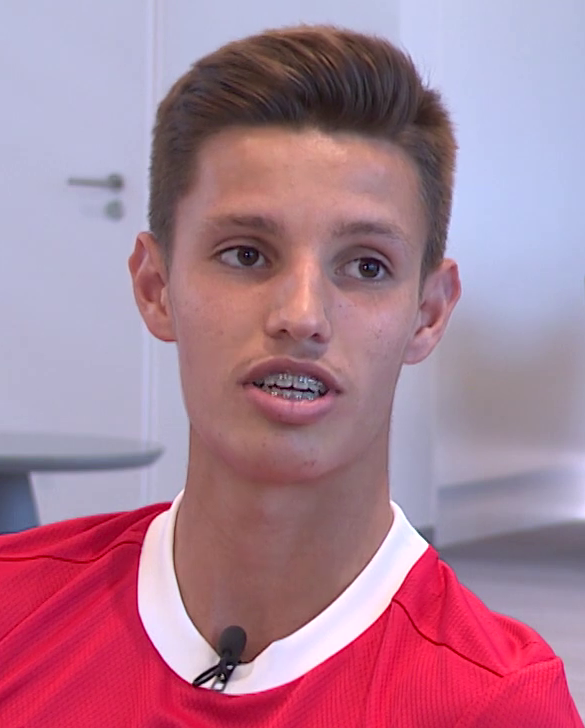
- Dantas with Benfica in 2019

Personal information
- Full name: Tiago Filipe Oliveira Dantas
- Date of birth: 24 December 2000 (age 25)
- Place of birth: Lisbon, Portugal
- Height: 1.70 m (5 ft 7 in)
- Position: Central midfielder

Team information
- Current team: Rijeka
- Number: 26

Youth career
- 2010–2020: Benfica

Senior career*
Years	Team	Apps	(Gls)
2018–2019	Benfica B	49	(5)
2019–2024	Benfica	0	(0)
2020–2021	→ Bayern Munich II (loan)	7	(0)
2021	→ Bayern Munich (loan)	2	(0)
2021–2022	→ Tondela (loan)	26	(1)
2022–2023	→ PAOK (loan)	32	(4)
2023–2024	→ AZ (loan)	20	(1)
2024–2025	Osijek	30	(1)
2025–	Rijeka	37	(8)

International career^{‡}
2016	Portugal U16	2	(0)
2016	Portugal U17	2	(0)
2018–2019	Portugal U19	8	(1)
2019	Portugal U20	4	(1)
2021–2023	Portugal U21	18	(1)
- * Club domestic league appearances and goals as of 15 September 2026 ‡ National team caps and goals as of 7 July 2023

Tiago Filipe Oliveira Dantas (born 24 December 2000) is a Portuguese professional footballer who plays as a midfielder for HNL club Rijeka.

== Club career ==
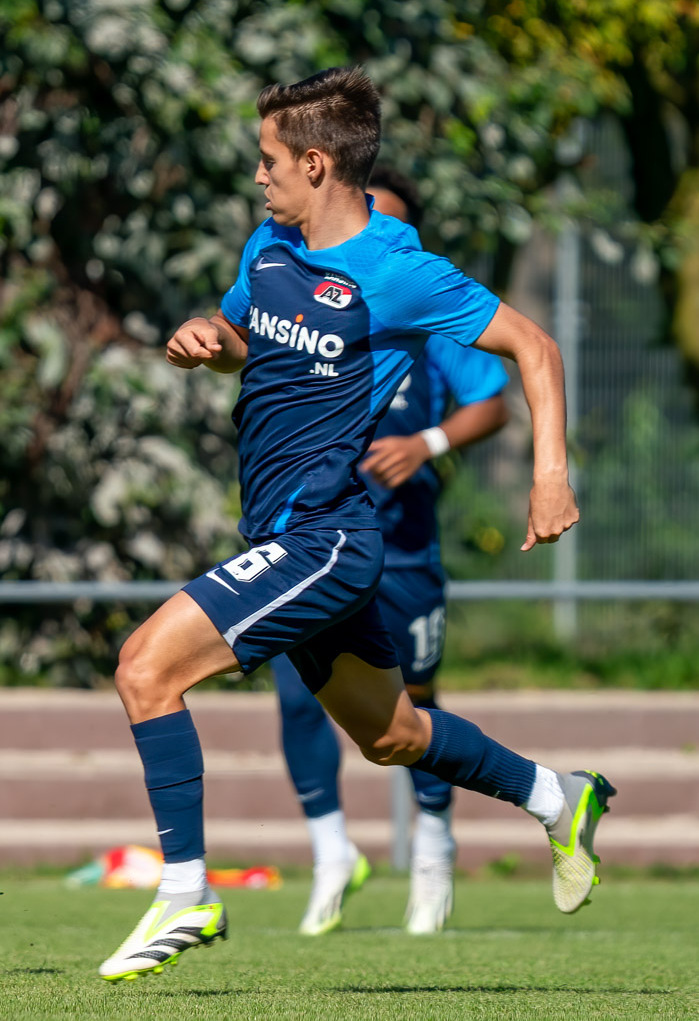
Dantas playing for AZ in 2023

Dantas was born on 24 December 2000 in Lisbon, Portugal. In August 2018, he made his professional debut with Benfica B. Half a year later, he reached the first team in a match against Vitória de Setúbal for the Portuguese Cup.

In October 2020, he moved to Bayern Munich on loan. Bayern decided not to pay the buyout, and the player returned to Benfica. Dantas was then loaned to Tondela for the 2021–22 Primeira Liga.

In June 2022, PAOK announced the acquisition of Dantas in the form of a loan from Benfica until the summer of 2023.

On 24 July 2023, Eredivisie side AZ Alkmaar announced the signing of Dantas from Benfica on a season-long loan with a future option to buy.

== Club statistics ==
As of match played 23 May 2026

Appearances and goals by club, season and competition
Club	Season	League			National Cup		League Cup		Continental		Total	
Club	Season	Division	Apps	Goals	Apps	Goals	Apps	Goals	Apps	Goals	Apps	Goals
Benfica B	2018–19	LigaPro	21	2	0	0	—		—		21	2
Benfica B	2019–20	LigaPro	23	3	0	0	—		—		23	3
Benfica B	2020–21	Liga Portugal 2	5	0	0	0	—		—		5	0
Benfica B	Total		49	5	0	0	—		—		49	5
Benfica	2019–20	Primeira Liga	0	0	0	0	1	0	0	0	1	0
Benfica	2020–21	Primeira Liga	0	0	0	0	0	0	0	0	0	0
Benfica	Total		0	0	0	0	1	0	0	0	1	0
Bayern Munich (loan)	2020–21	Bundesliga	2	0	0	0	—		0	0	2	0
Bayern Munich II (loan)	2020–21	3. Liga	7	0	—		—		—		7	0
Tondela (loan)	2021–22	Primeira Liga	26	1	7	3	1	0	—		34	4
PAOK (loan)	2022–23	Super League Greece	32	4	5	0	—		2 (Note: Appearances in the UEFA Europa Conference League)	1	39	5
AZ (loan)	2023–24	Eredivisie	20	1	1	0	—		5	0	26	1
Osijek	2024–25	Croatian Football League	21	1	3	0	—		—		24	1
Rijeka	2025–26	Croatian Football League	31	7	5	2	—		16 (Note: Two appearances in the UEFA Champions League, four appearances and one goal in the UEFA Europa League, ten appearances in the UEFA Europa Conference League)	1	52	10
Career Total			188	19	21	5	2	0	23	2	234	26

== Honours ==
Benfica

- Campeonato Nacional de Juniores: 2017–18
- UEFA Youth League runner-up: 2019–20

Bayern Munich

- Bundesliga: 2020–21
- FIFA Club World Cup: 2020
