= Branko Pavić =

Croatian footballer (born 2006)

Personal information
- Date of birth: 7 November 2006 (age 19)
- Place of birth: Zagreb, Croatia
- Height: 1.85 m (6 ft 1 in)
- Position: Defensive midfielder

Team information
- Current team: Rijeka
- Number: 6

Youth career
- Tekstilac Ravnice
- Dubrava
- 2019–2024: Dinamo Zagreb

Senior career*
Years	Team	Apps	(Gls)
2024–2026	Dinamo Zagreb	9	(0)
2025–2026	→ Dubrava (loan)	13	(0)
2026–	Rijeka	10	(0)

International career^{‡}
2022	Croatia U16	3	(0)
2022–2023	Croatia U17	7	(0)
2024	Croatia U18	3	(0)
2023–2025	Croatia U19	8	(1)
2024–	Croatia U21	2	(0)
- * Club domestic league appearances and goals as of 2 August 2026 ‡ National team caps and goals as of 18 November 2025

Branko Pavić (born 7 November 2006) is a Croatian professional footballer who plays as a defensive midfielder for Croatian Football League club Rijeka, where he wears number 6.

== Club career ==
=== Dinamo Zagreb ===
Born in Zagreb, Pavić began playing football with Tekstilac Ravnice and later joined Dubrava. He moved to the Dinamo Zagreb academy in 2019, aged 13, and subsequently captained the club's junior team.

Pavić made his senior debut for Dinamo on 18 May 2024, appearing as a substitute in a 3–2 league win away to Slaven Belupo. On 27 November 2024, at the age of 18, he made his UEFA Champions League debut when he started Dinamo's 3–0 home defeat by Borussia Dortmund. Dinamo coach Nenad Bjelica subsequently praised Pavić's composure, tactical discipline and defensive positioning in the match. He made 12 first-team appearances for Dinamo in all competitions before a knee injury in February 2025 kept him out for more than six months.

=== Loan to Dubrava ===
In August 2025, Pavić returned to his former club Dubrava on loan to gain regular playing time following his injury. He made 13 appearances in the Croatian second tier during the first half of the 2025–26 season. In January 2026, Sportske novosti described him as having become a prominent member of the Dubrava team after recovering from injury.

=== Rijeka ===
On 19 January 2026, Pavić transferred permanently to Rijeka and signed a contract running until 2029. He made nine league appearances for Rijeka during the remainder of the 2025–26 season and started the opening match of the 2026–27 league campaign. By August 2026, he was receiving regular first-team playing time under manager Matjaž Kek.

== International career ==
Pavić has represented Croatia at under-16, under-17, under-18, under-19 and under-21 levels. He played in all three of Croatia's matches at the 2023 UEFA European Under-17 Championship.

He made his Croatia under-21 debut on 15 October 2024, coming on as a substitute in a 3–2 win against Greece in qualification for the 2025 UEFA European Under-21 Championship.
