= Michael Agbekpornu =

Ghanaian professional footballer (born 1998)

Personal information
- Date of birth: 31 August 1998 (age 28)
- Place of birth: Accra, Ghana
- Height: 1.88 m (6 ft 2 in)
- Position: Midfielder

Team information
- Current team: Raja CA
- Number: 30

Youth career
- –2018: Dreams FC

Senior career*
| Years | Team | Apps | (Gls) |
| 2018–2021 | Dreams FC | 25 | (0) |
| 2021–2023 | Egnatia | 49 | (1) |
| 2023–2026 | Slaven Belupo | 54 | (1) |
| 2026 | Huesca | 10 | (0) |
| 2026– | Raja CA | 0 | (0) |

International career^{‡}
| 2019 | Ghana U23 | 5 | (0) |
- * Club domestic league appearances and goals as of 22 August 2026 ‡ National team caps and goals as of 22 November 2019

Michael Agbekpornu (born 31 August 1998) is a Ghanaian professional footballer who plays as a midfielder for Botola club Raja CA.

== Club career ==
=== Dreams FC ===
==== 2018–2019 season ====
Agbekpornu joined Dreams FC in December 2018. He made his debut during the 2019 GFA Normalization Committee Special Competition. On 31 March 2019, he made his league debut playing the full 90 minutes in a 1–0 loss to Hearts of Oak.

Prior to the 2019–20 Ghana Premier League season, he received an injury whilst on international duty for the Ghana under-23 which kept him out of the whole season even though the league did not end as it was cancelled as a result of the COVID-19 pandemic.

==== 2020–2021 season ====
In October 2020, he, along with three other players, including Kingsley Owusu and Victor Oduro, signed a new three-year deal to keep them at the club until 2023.

After he recovered from injury, he was named on the club's squad list for the 2020–21 Ghana Premier League in the club's bid to push for a top 4 league position at the end of the season. In November 2020, he was named as the new club captain ahead of the season. On 22 November 2020, he was adjudged the man of the match after an impressive display after a 2–1 victory over Medeama SC with the goals coming in from Ibrahim Issah and Joseph Esso, helping the club to secure their first victory of the season.

== International career ==
Agbekpornu received call-ups into Ghana national under-23 football team in 2018–2019. On 10 September 2019, he made his debut in a 1–0 victory over Algeria during the 2019 Africa U-23 Cup of Nations qualifiers, which sealed qualification into the main competition which was hosted by Egypt. He was a member of the squad that featured during the 2019 Africa U-23 Cup of Nations, the team however reached the semi-final but could not qualify for the 2020 Summer Olympics as they lost the semi-final match against Ivory Coast on penalties and their 3rd place match to South Africa also on penalties.

== Honours ==
Egnatia

- Albanian Cup: 2022–23
