= Nova Bila =

Village in Bosnia and Herzegovina

- Village
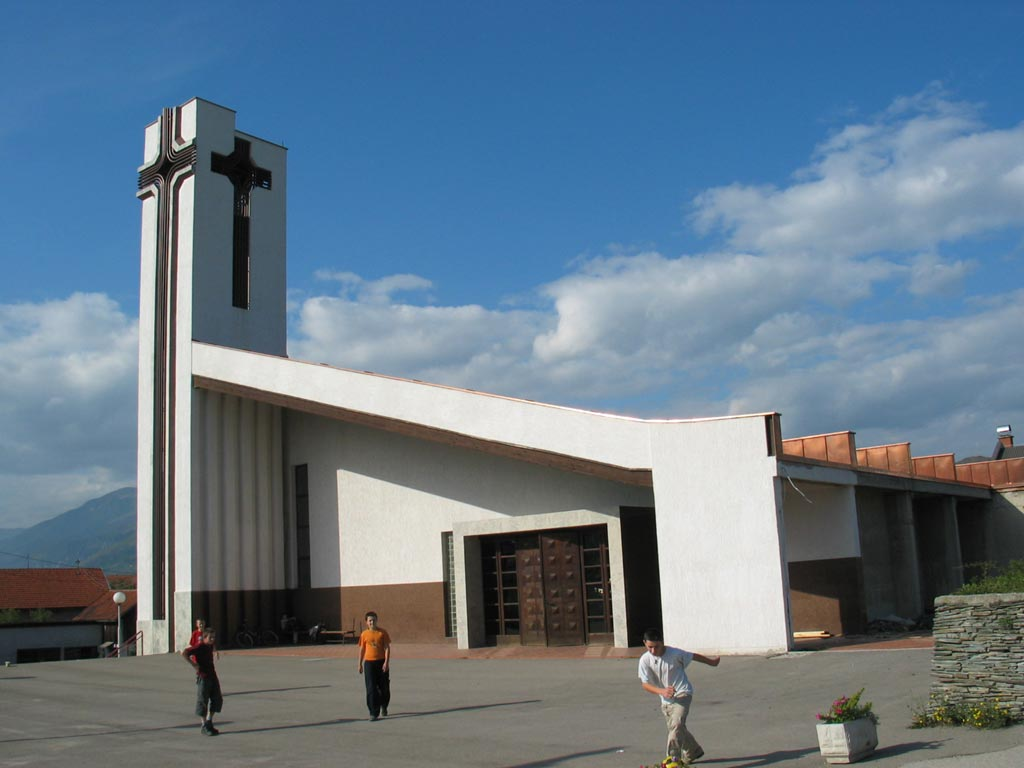

- Location within Bosnia and Herzegovina
- Coordinates: 44.195681°N 17.7294874°E
- Country: Bosnia and Herzegovina
- Entity: Federation of Bosnia and Herzegovina
- Canton: Central Bosnia
- Municipality: Travnik

Area
  - Total: 0.33 sq mi (0.86 km^{2})

Population (2013)
  - Total: 692
  - Density: 2,100/sq mi (800/km^{2})
- Time zone: UTC+1 (CET)
  - Summer (DST): UTC+2 (CEST)

Nova Bila is a village in the municipality of Travnik, Bosnia and Herzegovina.

== Demographics ==
According to the 2013 census, its population was 692.

Ethnicity in 2013
Ethnicity	Number	Percentage
Croats	679	98.1%
Bosniaks	3	0.4%
Serbs	3	0.4%
other/undeclared	7	1.0%
Total	692	100%
