= Martin Zlomislić =

Bosnian footballer (born 1998)

Personal information
- Full name: Martin Zlomislić
- Date of birth: 16 August 1998 (age 28)
- Place of birth: Posušje, Bosnia and Herzegovina
- Height: 1.89 m (6 ft 2 in)
- Position: Goalkeeper

Team information
- Current team: Qarabağ
- Number: 23

Youth career
- 2013–2017: Široki Brijeg

Senior career*
Years	Team	Apps	(Gls)
2017–2021	Široki Brijeg	38	(0)
2021–2026	Rijeka	77	(0)
2026–	Qarabağ	4	(0)

International career^{‡}
2016–2017	Bosnia and Herzegovina U19	1	(0)
2019–2020	Bosnia and Herzegovina U21	2	(0)
2024–	Bosnia and Herzegovina	8	(0)
- * Club domestic league appearances and goals as of 11 October 2026 ‡ National team caps and goals as of 17 November 2026

Martin Zlomislić (born 16 August 1998) is a Bosnian professional footballer who plays as a goalkeeper for Azerbaijan Premier League club Qarabağ and Bosnia and Herzegovina national team.

He started his professional career at Široki Brijeg in 2017, at the age of 19.

== Club career ==
=== Široki Brijeg ===
Zlomislić started playing football in Široki Brijeg. He got called up to the first team in June 2017, but didn't make his professional debut for the club until 13 May 2018, which was a 3–1 home league win against Željezničar. Zlomislić didn't become a first team regular until the 2019–20 season, playing in 18 of Široki's 23 games in the first part of the season.

He started off the 2020–21 Bosnian Premier League season with a clean sheet in a 1–0 win against Tuzla City on 2 August 2020.

In a league game against Sloboda Tuzla on 29 August 2020, Zlomislić earned himself a straight red card after fouling an opposing player.

On 31 March 2021, he terminated his contract with Široki Brijeg and left the club.

=== Qarabağ ===
In June 2026, while the player was in the USA with the national team at the World Cup, news spread that he had signed a contract with Qarabağ, Azerbaijan's biggest club. On 21 June 2026, the "Horsemen" officially announced the player's transfer. Qarabağ, the most successful and decorated club in Azerbaijan, signed a 3+1 year contract with the player. Zlomislić will wear the number 23 shirt at Qarabağ.

== International career ==
Zlomislić, an ethnic Croat, represented Bosnia and Herzegovina at under-19 and under-21 level, making 1 cap for the under-19 and 2 caps for the under-21 national team respectively.

He played his first match for the senior team in a UEFA Nations League match against the Netherlands on 19 November 2024. The match finished 1-1, with Bosnia already relegated before the match.

== Career statistics ==
=== Club ===
As of match played 11 October 2026

Appearances and goals by club, season and competition
Club	Season	League			National cup (Note: Includes Bosnian Cup, Croatian Cup)		Continental		Total	
Club	Season	Division	Apps	Goals	Apps	Goals	Apps	Goals	Apps	Goals
Široki Brijeg	2017–18	Bosnian Premier League	2	0	1	0	0	0	2	0
Široki Brijeg	2018–19	Bosnian Premier League	4	0	1	0	—		5	0
Široki Brijeg	2019–20	Bosnian Premier League	19	0	0	0	2 (Note: Appearances in UEFA Europa League)	0	21	0
Široki Brijeg	2020–21	Bosnian Premier League	13	0	1	0	—		14	0
Široki Brijeg	Total		38	0	3	0	2	0	43	0
Rijeka	2021–22	Croatian Football League	9	0	1	0	0	0	10	0
Rijeka	2022–23	Croatian Football League	0	0	2	0	0	0	2	0
Rijeka	2023–24	Croatian Football League	1	0	6	0	0	0	7	0
Rijeka	2024–25	Croatian Football League	34	0	5	0	6 (Note: Four appearances in UEFA Europa League; two appearances in UEFA Conference League)	0	45	0
Rijeka	2025–26	Croatian Football League	33	0	4	0	16 (Note: Two appearances in UEFA Champions League; four appearances in UEFA Europa League; ten appearances in UEFA Conference League)	0	53	0
Rijeka	Total		77	0	18	0	22	0	117	0
Qarabağ	2026–27	Azerbaijan Premier League	4	0	0	0	3 (Note: Appearances in UEFA Conference League)	0	7	0
Career total			119	0	21	0	27	0	167	0

=== International ===
As of match played 17 November 2026

Appearances and goals by national team and year
National team	Year	Apps	Goals
Bosnia and Herzegovina	2024	1	0
Bosnia and Herzegovina	2025	1	0
Bosnia and Herzegovina	2026	6	0
Total		8	0

== Honours ==
Rijeka

- Croatian Football League: 2024–25
- Croatian Football Cup: 2024–25
