= Toni Fruk =

Croatian footballer (born 2001)

Personal information
- Date of birth: 9 March 2001 (age 25)
- Place of birth: Našice, Croatia
- Height: 1.74 m (5 ft 9 in)
- Positions: Attacking midfielder; forward

Team information
- Current team: Rijeka
- Number: 10

Youth career
- 2008–2011: NAŠK
- 2012–2018: KNŠ Hypo Limač
- 2018–2019: Mouscron
- 2019–2020: Fiorentina

Senior career*
Years	Team	Apps	(Gls)
2020–2023	Fiorentina	0	(0)
2020–2021	→ Dubrava (loan)	24	(8)
2021–2023	→ Gorica (loan)	53	(12)
2023–	Rijeka	104	(28)

International career^{‡}
2015	Croatia U14	2	(0)
2016	Croatia U15	5	(2)
2017	Croatia U16	3	(1)
2016–2018	Croatia U17	24	(0)
2018	Croatia U18	5	(0)
2020	Croatia U19	2	(1)
2021	Croatia U20	1	(0)
2021–2023	Croatia U21	6	(2)
2025–	Croatia	7	(1)
- * Club domestic league appearances and goals as of 20 September 2026 ‡ National team caps and goals as of 31 March 2026

Toni Fruk (born 9 March 2001) is a Croatian professional footballer who plays as an attacking midfielder or forward for Croatian Football League club Rijeka and the Croatia national team.

== Club career ==
In 2018, Fruk joined the youth academy of Belgian club Mouscron. Before the second half of 2018–19, he signed for Italian club Fiorentina in Serie A. In 2020, he was sent on loan to Croatian second division club Dubrava. In 2021, Fruk was sent on loan to Gorica in the Croatian top flight. On 17 July 2021, Fruk debuted for Gorica during a 2–0 loss against Rijeka. On 26 September 2021, he scored his first goal for Gorica during another loss against Rijeka, this time a 4–3 loss.

On 12 July 2023, Rijeka announced the signing of Fruk until 2027.

== International career ==
Fruk was called up to the senior Croatia squad for the 2026 FIFA World Cup qualification matches against Gibraltar and the Czech Republic on 6 and 9 June 2025 respectively. He debuted in the same tournament against Faroe Islands on 5 September.

On 18 May 2026, Fruk was selected in the 26-man squad for the 2026 FIFA World Cup.

== Career statistics ==
=== International ===
As of match played 31 March 2026

Appearances and goals by national team and year
National team	Year	Apps	Goals
Croatia	2025	5	1
Croatia	2026	2	0
Total		7	1

Scores and results list Croatia's goal tally first.

List of international goals scored by Toni Fruk
No.	Date	Venue	Opponent	Score	Result	Competition
1	12 October 2025	Stadion Varteks, Varaždin, Croatia	Gibraltar	1–0	3–0	2026 FIFA World Cup qualification

== Honours ==
Rijeka

- Croatian Football League: 2024–25
- Croatian Football Cup: 2024–25

Individual

- Croatian Football League top assist provider: 2023–24
- Croatian football cup top goalscorer: 2024–25
- Croatian Football League Player of the year: 2025
