= 2024–25 Croatian Football Cup =

SuperSport Hrvatski nogometni kup

Tournament details
- Country: Croatia
- Teams: 48

Final positions
- Champions: Rijeka
- Runners-up: Slaven Belupo

Tournament statistics
- Matches played: 48
- Goals scored: 145 (3.02 per match)
- Top goal scorer(s): Angelo Bernardo Radović; Toni Fruk (4 each)

The 2024–25 Croatian Football Cup is the 34th season of Croatia's football knockout competition. It is sponsored by the betting company SuperSport and known as the SuperSport Hrvatski nogometni kup for sponsorship purposes. The defending champions were Dinamo Zagreb, having won their seventeenth and second consecutive title the previous year by defeating Rijeka in the final.

== Calendar ==
Round	Date(s)	Number of fixtures	Clubs	New entries this round	Financial sponsorship	Goals / games
Preliminary round	28 August 2024	16	48 → 32	32	€1,200 (both teams)	58 / 16
Round of 32	11 September 2024	16	32 → 16	16	€2,000 (home)	48 / 16
Round of 16	30 October 2024	8	16 → 8	none	€2,500 (home)	23 / 8
Quarter-finals	26 February 2025	4	8 → 4	none	€4,000 (home)	12 / 4
Semi-finals	2 April 2025	2	4 → 2	none	€6,000 (home) / €6,000 (guest)	1 / 2
Final	14 and 29 May 2025	2	2 → 1	none	€20,000 (winner) / €10,000 (runner up)	3 / 2

== Participating clubs ==
The following 48 teams qualified for the competition:

Best clubs by cup coefficient 16 clubs	Winners and runners up of county cups 32 clubs
Rijeka; Hajduk Split; Dinamo Zagreb; Osijek; Lokomotiva; Slaven Belupo; Istra 1961; Šibenik; Gorica; Varaždin; Rudeš; BSK Bijelo Brdo; Jaska Vinogradar; Oriolik; Mladost Ždralovi; Belišće	Osijek-Baranja County cup winner: Zrinski Osječko; Osijek-Baranja County cup runner up: Đakovo Croatia; Zagreb County cup winner: Samobor; Zagreb County cup runner up: Sava Strmec; City of Zagreb cup winner: Jarun; City of Zagreb cup runner up: Kustošija; Brod-Posavina County cup winner: Tomislav Donji Andrijevci; Brod-Posavina County cup runner up: Sloga Nova Gradiška; Vukovar-Srijem County cup winner: Bedem Ivankovo; Vukovar-Srijem County cup runner up: Sloga Borovo; Međimurje County cup winner: Polet SMnM; Međimurje County cup runner up: Međimurec; Koprivnica-Križevci County cup winner: Radnik Križevci; Koprivnica-Križevci County cup runner up: Ferdinandovac; Istria County cup winner: Jadran Poreč; Istria County cup runner up: Banjole; Sisak-Moslavina County cup winner: Moslavina Kutina; Sisak-Moslavina County cup runner up: Mladost Petrinja; Varaždin County cup winner: Varteks; Varaždin County cup runner up: Bednja Beletinec; Bjelovar-Bilogora County cup winner: Bjelovar; Bjelovar-Bilogora County cup runner up: Bilogora 91; Split-Dalmatia County cup winner: Dugopolje; Primorje-Gorski Kotar County cup winner: Orijent; Požega-Slavonia County cup winner: Slavonija Požega; Virovitica-Podravina County cup winner: Pitomača; Zadar County cup winner: Hrvatski Vitez; Karlovac County cup winner: Karlovac 1919; Dubrovnik-Neretva County cup winner: Neretvanac Opuzen; Krapina-Zagorje County cup winner: Gaj Mače; Šibenik-Knin County cup winner: Zagora Unešić; Lika-Senj County cup winner: Nehaj Senj

== Preliminary round ==
The draw for the preliminary single-legged round was held on 1 August 2024 and the matches were played on 27–28 August 2024.

Tie no.	Home team	Score	Away team
1	Samobor	10–1	Ferdinandovac
2	Bednja	2–1	Orijent
3	Neretvanac Opuzen	2–0	Bedem Ivankovo
4	Bilogora 91	1–0	Zagora Unešić
5	Dugopolje	0–0 (6–5 p)	Jarun Zagreb
6	Banjole	2–0	Mladost Petrinja
7	Jadran Poreč	2–2 (3–2 p)	Radnik Križevci
8	Gaj Mače	2–1 (a.e.t.)	Karlovac 1919
9	Nehaj Senj	0–4	Đakovo Croatia
10	Sava Strmec	0–7	Pitomača
11	Sloga Nova Gradiška	0–1	Bjelovar
12	Međimurec	1–4 (a.e.t.)	Varteks
13	Kustošija	3–0	Polet SMNM
14	Zrinski Osječko	4–0	Moslavina
15	Tomislav Donji Andrijevci	5–0	Sloga Borovo
16	Hrvatski Vitez	1–2	Slavonija Požega

== Round of 32 ==
The draw was determined according to the principle of opposite numbers, which were assigned based on the club coefficient. Matches were played on 10–25 September 2024.

Tie no.	Home team	Score	Away team
1	Banjole	1–3	Dinamo Zagreb
2	Bilogora 91	0–4	Hajduk Split
3	Neretvanac Opuzen	1–3	Rijeka
4	Samobor	2–4	Lokomotiva
5	Varteks	1–3	Osijek
6	Đakovo Croatia	1–1 (4–5 p)	Gorica
7	Tomislav Donji Andrijevci	0–2	Istra 1961
8	Kustošija	0–1	Slaven Belupo
9	Zrinski Osječko	0–2	Šibenik
10	Pitomača	1–2	Rudeš
11	Gaj Mače	1–2	Varaždin
12	Slavonija Požega	3–0	Oriolik
13	Dugopolje	1–0	BSK Bijelo Brdo
14	Bednja	3–0	Belišće
15	Jadran Poreč	0–2	Mladost Ždralovi
16	Bjelovar	4–0	Jaska Vinogradar

== Round of 16 ==
The draw was determined according to the principle of opposite numbers, which were assigned based on the club coefficient. Matches were played on 22 October 2024 – 11 February 2025.

Tie no.	Home team	Score	Away team
1	Bjelovar	2–3	Dinamo Zagreb
2	Mladost Ždralovi	0–3	Hajduk Split
3	Bednja	0–3	Rijeka
4	Dugopolje	0–1	Lokomotiva
5	Slavonija Požega	1–2	Osijek
6	Varaždin	1–1 (4–5 p)	Gorica
7	Rudeš	1–2	Istra 1961
8	Šibenik	1–2	Slaven Belupo

== Quarter-finals ==
The draw was held on 12 December 2024. The matches were scheduled for 26 February 2025. Two matches were rescheduled for early March.

Tie no.	Home team	Score	Away team
1	Slaven Belupo	3–1 (a.e.t.)	Gorica
2	Istra 1961	3–0	Lokomotiva
3	Hajduk Split	1–3	Rijeka
4	Dinamo Zagreb	0–1	Osijek

== Semi-finals ==
The semi-finals will be played on 2 April 2025, while the draw was held on 4 March 2024.

2 April 2025
17:00

Slaven Belupo	0–0 (a.e.t.)	Osijek
	Report
Penalties
Nestorovski (penalty scored); Šuto (penalty missed); Lepinjica (penalty scored); Caimacov (penalty scored); Boras (penalty scored)	4–3	(penalty scored) Dantas; (penalty scored) Lima; (penalty scored) Omerović; (penalty missed) Soldo; (penalty missed) Hernâni

Gradski stadion Ivan Kušek-Apaš, Koprivnica
Attendance: 2,787
Referee: Patrik Kolarić (Čakovec)

2 April 2025
20:00

Rijeka	1–0	Istra 1961
Fruk 86'	Report

Stadion Rujevica, Rijeka
Attendance: 6,109
Referee: Igor Pajač (Osijek)

== Final ==
The first match of the final was played on 14 May 2025, and the second was played on 29 May 2025.

14 May 2025
18:00

Slaven Belupo	1–1	Rijeka
Bosec 69'	Report	Fruk 26'

Gradski stadion Ivan Kušek-Apaš, Koprivnica
Attendance: 4,448
Referee: Patrik Kolarić (Čakovec)

29 May 2025
18:00

Rijeka	1–0	Slaven Belupo
Djouahra 60'	Report

Stadion Rujevica, Rijeka
Attendance: 8,181
Referee: Dario Bel (Osijek)

== Top scorers ==
Final ranking of top scorers.

Rank	Player	Club	Goals
1	(Croatia) Angelo Bernardo Radović	Samobor	4
1	(Croatia) Toni Fruk	Rijeka	4
3	(Croatia) Marco Pašalić	Rijeka	3
3	(Croatia) Vanja Kulenović	Samobor	3
3	(Ivory Coast) Eric Augusto Akassou	Pitomača	3
3	(Croatia) Duje Čop	Lokomotiva / Rijeka	3
3	(Croatia) Adriano Jagušić	Slaven Belupo	3
8	14 players from 13 clubs		2
