= 2023 UEFA European Under-19 Championship squads =

Player listings in youth football competition

The 2023 UEFA European Under-19 Championship was an international football tournament held in Malta from 3 to 16 July 2023.

Each national team submitted a squad of 20 players, two of whom had to be goalkeepers.

Players in boldface have been capped at full international level since the tournament.

Ages are as of the start of the tournament, 3 July 2023.

== Group A ==
=== Malta ===
Head coach: (Portugal) Tozé Mendes

The final 20-men squad was revealed on 29 June 2023.

No.	Pos.	Player	Date of birth (age)	Club
1	GK	Hugo Sacco	12 January 2004 (aged 19)	(French Football Federation) Olympique Marseille
12	GK	Luca Camilleri	25 November 2005 (aged 17)	(Malta Football Association) Mosta
3	DF	Mattias Ellul	3 December 2004 (aged 18)	(Malta Football Association) St. Andrews
4	DF	Sven Xerri	10 February 2005 (aged 18)	(Malta Football Association) Ħamrun Spartans
5	DF	Jake Vassallo	21 June 2004 (aged 19)	(Malta Football Association) Mosta
6	DF	Jake Micallef (captain)	12 January 2004 (aged 19)	(Portuguese Football Federation) Boavista
14	DF	Ivin Farrugia	2 June 2005 (aged 18)	(Malta Football Association) Pietà Hotspurs
15	DF	Tristan Viviani	17 February 2004 (aged 19)	(United States Soccer Federation) San Diego State Aztecs
2	MF	Andy Borg	27 June 2004 (aged 19)	(Malta Football Association) Gżira United
8	MF	Lucas Scicluna	7 November 2005 (aged 17)	(The Football Association) Wolverhampton Wanderers
10	MF	Dylan Scicluna	10 June 2004 (aged 19)	(The Football Association) Wolverhampton Wanderers
11	MF	Benjamin Hili	16 February 2004 (aged 19)	(Malta Football Association) Balzan
13	MF	Bjorn Buhagiar	10 February 2004 (aged 19)	(Malta Football Association) Ħamrun Spartans
16	MF	Lucas Caruana	24 September 2005 (aged 17)	(Italian Football Federation) Sampdoria
17	MF	Daniel Letherby	21 August 2004 (aged 18)	(United States Soccer Federation) Corpus Christi FC
20	MF	Brooklyn Borg	27 June 2004 (aged 19)	(Malta Football Association) Gżira United
7	FW	Nathan Cross	1 September 2004 (aged 18)	(Malta Football Association) Birkirkara
9	FW	**Basil Tuma**	24 April 2005 (aged 18)	(The Football Association) Reading
18	FW	Alfie Bridgman	11 April 2004 (aged 19)	(The Football Association) Eastbourne Borough
19	FW	Sean Gatt	25 August 2005 (aged 17)	(Portuguese Football Federation) Boavista

=== Portugal ===
Head coach: Joaquim Milheiro

The final 20-men squad was revealed on 26 June 2023.

No.	Pos.	Player	Date of birth (age)	Club
1	GK	Gonçalo Ribeiro	15 January 2006 (aged 17)	(Portuguese Football Federation) Porto
12	GK	Diogo Pinto	20 October 2004 (aged 18)	(Portuguese Football Federation) Sporting CP
2	DF	Gonçalo Esteves	27 February 2004 (aged 19)	(Portuguese Football Federation) Sporting CP
3	DF	António Ribeiro	21 March 2004 (aged 19)	(Portuguese Football Federation) Porto
4	DF	Gabriel Brás	25 March 2004 (aged 19)	(Portuguese Football Federation) Porto
5	DF	Martim Marques	11 February 2004 (aged 19)	(Portuguese Football Federation) Sporting CP
13	DF	Martim Fernandes	18 January 2006 (aged 17)	(Portuguese Football Federation) Porto
14	DF	Luís Gomes	13 April 2005 (aged 18)	(Portuguese Football Federation) Porto
6	MF	Nuno Félix	16 March 2004 (aged 19)	(Portuguese Football Federation) Benfica
8	MF	Gustavo Sá	11 November 2004 (aged 18)	(Portuguese Football Federation) Famalicão
10	MF	Diogo Prioste (captain)	26 March 2004 (aged 19)	(Portuguese Football Federation) Benfica
16	MF	Yanis da Rocha	10 May 2004 (aged 19)	(French Football Federation) Troyes
17	MF	João Vasconcelos	26 February 2005 (aged 18)	(Portuguese Football Federation) Sporting Braga
18	MF	Samuel Justo	2 April 2005 (aged 18)	(Portuguese Football Federation) Sporting CP
7	FW	Carlos Borges	19 March 2004 (aged 19)	(The Football Association) Manchester City
9	FW	Rodrigo Ribeiro	28 April 2005 (aged 18)	(Portuguese Football Federation) Sporting CP
11	FW	Jorge Meireles	4 April 2004 (aged 19)	(Portuguese Football Federation) Porto
15	FW	Herculano Nabian	25 January 2004 (aged 19)	(Italian Football Federation) Empoli
19	FW	Miguel Falé	28 January 2004 (aged 19)	(Portuguese Football Federation) Sporting Braga
20	FW	Hugo Félix	3 March 2004 (aged 19)	(Portuguese Football Federation) Benfica

=== Poland ===
Head coach: Marcin Brosz

The final 21-men squad was revealed on 25 June 2023.

No.	Pos.	Player	Date of birth (age)	Club
1	GK	Oliwier Zych (captain)	28 June 2004 (aged 19)	(The Football Association) Aston Villa
12	GK	Aleksander Bobek	7 April 2004 (aged 19)	(Polish Football Association) ŁKS Łódź
22	GK	Sławomir Abramowicz	9 June 2004 (aged 19)	(Polish Football Association) Jagiellonia Białystok
2	DF	Igor Drapiński	31 May 2004 (aged 19)	(Polish Football Association) Wisła Płock
3	DF	Jakub Lewicki	17 September 2005 (aged 17)	(Polish Football Association) Jagiellonia Białystok
4	DF	Miłosz Matysik	26 April 2004 (aged 19)	(Polish Football Association) Jagiellonia Białystok
7	DF	Dawid Bugaj	9 July 2004 (aged 18)	(Italian Football Federation) SPAL
13	DF	Wiktor Smoliński	20 June 2004 (aged 19)	(Polish Football Association) KKS Kalisz
14	DF	Wiktor Matyjewicz	11 January 2004 (aged 19)	(Italian Football Federation) Hellas Verona
23	DF	Kacper Przybyłko	5 February 2005 (aged 18)	(Polish Football Association) Wisła Kraków
6	MF	**Antoni Kozubal**	18 August 2004 (aged 18)	(Polish Football Association) GKS Katowice
8	MF	Iwo Kaczmarski	16 April 2004 (aged 19)	(Italian Football Federation) Empoli
10	MF	**Kacper Urbański**	7 September 2004 (aged 18)	(Italian Football Federation) Bologna
11	MF	Miłosz Brzozowski	17 September 2004 (aged 18)	(German Football Association) Hansa Rostock
15	MF	Mateusz Kowalczyk	19 April 2004 (aged 19)	(Polish Football Association) ŁKS Łódź
19	MF	Mateusz Kowalski	21 July 2005 (aged 17)	(Italian Football Federation) Parma
20	MF	Igor Strzałek	19 January 2004 (aged 19)	(Polish Football Association) Legia Warsaw
21	MF	Tomasz Pieńko	5 January 2004 (aged 19)	(Polish Football Association) Zagłębie Lubin
9	FW	Jordan Majchrzak	8 October 2004 (aged 18)	(Italian Football Federation) Roma
16	FW	Junior Nsangou	2 September 2005 (aged 17)	(The Football Association) Blackburn Rovers
17	FW	Dominik Biniek	5 September 2004 (aged 18)	(The Football Association) Blackburn Rovers

=== Italy ===
Head coach: Alberto Bollini

Italy named a 27-men preliminary squad on 22 June 2023. The final 20-men squad was revealed on 29 June.

No.	Pos.	Player	Date of birth (age)	Club
1	GK	Davide Mastrantonio	16 January 2004 (aged 19)	(Italian Football Federation) Triestina
12	GK	Lorenzo Palmisani	12 June 2004 (aged 19)	(Italian Football Federation) Frosinone
2	DF	Filippo Missori	24 March 2004 (aged 19)	(Italian Football Federation) Roma
3	DF	Jacopo Regonesi	28 March 2004 (aged 19)	(Italian Football Federation) Atalanta
4	DF	**Fabio Chiarodia**	5 June 2005 (aged 18)	(German Football Association) Werder Bremen
5	DF	Lorenzo Dellavalle	4 April 2004 (aged 19)	(Italian Football Federation) Juventus
6	DF	Alessandro Dellavalle	11 May 2004 (aged 19)	(Italian Football Federation) Torino
13	DF	**Michael Kayode**	10 July 2004 (aged 18)	(Italian Football Federation) Fiorentina
14	DF	Andrea Bozzolan	23 February 2004 (aged 19)	(Italian Football Federation) AC Milan
8	MF	**Cher Ndour**	24 July 2004 (aged 18)	(Portuguese Football Federation) Benfica
15	MF	**Luca Lipani**	18 May 2005 (aged 18)	(Italian Football Federation) Genoa
16	MF	**Giacomo Faticanti** (captain)	31 July 2004 (aged 18)	(Italian Football Federation) Roma
17	MF	Lorenzo Amatucci	5 February 2004 (aged 19)	(Italian Football Federation) Fiorentina
19	MF	**Niccolò Pisilli**	23 September 2004 (aged 18)	(Italian Football Federation) Roma
7	FW	Luis Hasa	6 January 2004 (aged 19)	(Italian Football Federation) Juventus
9	FW	**Pio Esposito**	28 June 2005 (aged 18)	(Italian Football Federation) Inter Milan
10	FW	Samuele Vignato	24 February 2004 (aged 19)	(Italian Football Federation) Monza
11	FW	Luca D'Andrea	6 September 2004 (aged 18)	(Italian Football Federation) Sassuolo
18	FW	Nicolò Turco	15 January 2004 (aged 19)	(Italian Football Federation) Juventus
20	FW	**Luca Koleosho**	15 September 2004 (aged 18)	(Royal Spanish Football Federation) Espanyol

== Group B ==
=== Iceland ===
Head coach: Ólafur Ingi Skúlason

The final 21-men squad was revealed on 6 June 2023 and revised on 26 June 2023.

No.	Pos.	Player	Date of birth (age)	Club
1	GK	Lúkas Petersson	9 February 2004 (aged 19)	(German Football Association) Hoffenheim
12	GK	Halldór Snær Georgsson	5 January 2004 (aged 19)	(Football Association of Iceland) Fjölnir
21	GK	Ásgeir Orri Magnússon	3 March 2004 (aged 19)	(Football Association of Iceland) Keflavík
2	DF	**Hlynur Freyr Karlsson**	6 April 2004 (aged 19)	(Football Association of Iceland) Valur
3	DF	Arnar Númi Gíslason	15 December 2004 (aged 18)	(Football Association of Iceland) Grótta
5	DF	Þorsteinn Aron Antonsson	13 January 2004 (aged 19)	(Football Association of Iceland) Selfoss
13	DF	Daníel Freyr Kristjánsson	30 August 2005 (aged 17)	(Danish Football Association) FC Midtjylland
18	DF	Arnar Daníel Aðalsteinsson	14 March 2004 (aged 19)	(Football Association of Iceland) Grótta
4	MF	**Logi Hrafn Róbertsson**	22 July 2004 (aged 18)	(Football Association of Iceland) FH
6	MF	Sigurbergur Áki Jörundsson	16 March 2004 (aged 19)	(Football Association of Iceland) Stjarnan
7	MF	Bjarni Guðjón Brynjólfsson	28 February 2004 (aged 19)	(Football Association of Iceland) Þór Akureyri
8	MF	Gísli Gottskálk Þórðarson	12 September 2004 (aged 18)	(Football Association of Iceland) Víkingur Reykjavík
10	MF	Eggert Aron Guðmundsson	8 February 2004 (aged 19)	(Football Association of Iceland) Stjarnan
11	MF	Guðmundur Baldvin Nökkvason	27 April 2004 (aged 19)	(Football Association of Iceland) Stjarnan
13	MF	Jóhannes Kristinn Bjarnason	24 February 2005 (aged 18)	(Football Association of Iceland) KR
16	MF	Róbert Frosti Þorkelsson	18 August 2005 (aged 17)	(Football Association of Iceland) Stjarnan
17	MF	Haukur Andri Haraldsson	24 August 2004 (aged 18)	(Football Association of Iceland) ÍA
19	MF	Ágúst Orri Þorsteinsson	14 January 2005 (aged 18)	(Football Association of Iceland) Breiðablik
9	FW	Adolf Daði Birgisson	3 June 2004 (aged 19)	(Football Association of Iceland) Stjarnan
15	FW	Ásgeir Galdur Guðmundsson	14 April 2006 (aged 17)	(Danish Football Association) FC Copenhagen
20	FW	Benoný Breki Andrésson	3 August 2005 (aged 17)	(Football Association of Iceland) KR

=== Greece ===
Head coach: Anastasios Theos

Greece named a 27-men preliminary squad on 21 June 2023. The final 20-men squad was revealed on 1 July.

No.	Pos.	Player	Date of birth (age)	Club
1	GK	Dimitrios Monastirlis	22 March 2004 (aged 19)	(Hellenic Football Federation) PAOK
12	GK	Nikolaos Botis	31 March 2004 (aged 19)	(Italian Football Federation) Inter Milan
2	DF	Charalampos Georgiadis	26 March 2005 (aged 18)	(Hellenic Football Federation) PAOK
3	DF	Nikolaos Deligiannis	22 March 2005 (aged 18)	(Hellenic Football Federation) PAOK
4	DF	Athanasios Prodromitis	29 February 2004 (aged 19)	(Hellenic Football Federation) Panathinaikos
5	DF	Dimitrios Keramitsis	1 July 2004 (aged 19)	(Italian Football Federation) Roma
6	DF	Alexios Kalogeropoulos (captain)	26 July 2004 (aged 18)	(Hellenic Football Federation) Olympiacos
7	MF	Zisis Tsikos	13 June 2004 (aged 19)	(Hellenic Football Federation) PAOK
8	MF	Vangelis Nikolaou	3 June 2004 (aged 19)	(Hellenic Football Federation) Panetolikos
11	MF	Georgios Kyriopoulos	24 August 2004 (aged 18)	(Hellenic Football Federation) Panathinaikos
14	MF	Dimitrios Kottas	14 January 2005 (aged 18)	(Hellenic Football Federation) PAOK
15	MF	Christos Stavropoulos	10 July 2004 (aged 18)	(Hellenic Football Federation) Olympiacos
16	MF	Anastasios Symeonidis	6 July 2004 (aged 18)	(Hellenic Football Federation) Panathinaikos
17	MF	Konstantinos Goumas	12 March 2005 (aged 18)	(Hellenic Football Federation) PAOK
19	MF	Nikolaos Spyrakos	23 February 2004 (aged 19)	(Hellenic Football Federation) PAOK
20	MF	Giannis Apostolakis	24 September 2004 (aged 18)	(Hellenic Football Federation) OFI
9	FW	Stefanos Tzimas	6 January 2006 (aged 17)	(Hellenic Football Federation) PAOK
10	FW	Lampros Smyrlis	12 July 2004 (aged 18)	(Hellenic Football Federation) PAOK
18	FW	Alexis Golfinos	24 November 2004 (aged 18)	(Hellenic Football Federation) AEK
21	FW	Giannis Gitersos	8 February 2004 (aged 19)	(Hellenic Football Federation) PAOK

=== Norway ===
Head coach: (Portugal) Luis Pimenta

The final 21-men squad was revealed on 14 June 2023.

No.	Pos.	Player	Date of birth (age)	Club
1	GK	Magnus Rugland Ree	26 April 2004 (aged 19)	(Norwegian Football Federation) Viking
12	GK	Viktor Engh	1 November 2004 (aged 18)	(Norwegian Football Federation) Lyn
21	GK	Peder Hoel Lervik	24 April 2005 (aged 18)	(Norwegian Football Federation) Molde
2	DF	Dylan Ryan Murugesapillai	7 January 2004 (aged 19)	(Norwegian Football Federation) Træff
3	DF	Vetle Walle Egeli	23 June 2004 (aged 19)	(Norwegian Football Federation) Sandefjord
4	DF	Nikolai Hopland	24 July 2004 (aged 18)	(Norwegian Football Federation) Aalesunds
5	DF	Vegard Solheim	10 August 2004 (aged 18)	(Norwegian Football Federation) Haugesund
13	DF	Aleksander Andresen	6 April 2005 (aged 18)	(Norwegian Football Federation) Stabæk
14	DF	Simen Haram	26 January 2004 (aged 19)	(Norwegian Football Federation) Aalesunds
15	DF	Rasmus Holten	20 February 2005 (aged 18)	(Norwegian Football Federation) Brann
16	DF	Eirik Blikstad	16 May 2004 (aged 19)	(Norwegian Football Federation) Strømsgodset
18	DF	Daniel Bassi	31 October 2004 (aged 18)	(Norwegian Football Federation) Tromsø
6	MF	Alwande Roaldsøy	9 June 2004 (aged 19)	(Italian Football Federation) Atalanta
7	MF	Syver Aas	15 January 2004 (aged 19)	(Norwegian Football Federation) Odds
8	MF	Niklas Ødegård	29 March 2004 (aged 19)	(Norwegian Football Federation) Molde
10	MF	Oliver Braude	21 February 2004 (aged 19)	(Royal Dutch Football Association) Heerenveen
9	FW	Erik Flataker	26 December 2004 (aged 18)	(Norwegian Football Federation) Sogndal
11	FW	Heine Bruseth	6 April 2004 (aged 19)	(Norwegian Football Federation) Kristiansund
17	FW	Henrik Skogvold	14 July 2004 (aged 18)	(Norwegian Football Federation) Lillestrøm
19	FW	Benjamin Faraas	8 September 2005 (aged 17)	(Norwegian Football Federation) Hamarkameratene
20	FW	Oskar Sivertsen	15 February 2004 (aged 19)	(Norwegian Football Federation) Kristiansund

=== Spain ===
Head coach: José Lana

Spain named a 25-men preliminary squad on 13 June 2023. The final 20-men squad was revealed on 1 July.

No.	Pos.	Player	Date of birth (age)	Club
1	GK	Bruno Iribarne	18 August 2004 (aged 18)	(Royal Spanish Football Federation) Almería
13	GK	Ander Astralaga	3 March 2004 (aged 19)	(Royal Spanish Football Federation) Barcelona
2	DF	Iván Fresneda	28 September 2004 (aged 18)	(Royal Spanish Football Federation) Valladolid
3	DF	Álex Valle	25 April 2004 (aged 19)	(Andorran Football Federation) Andorra
4	DF	Arnau Casas	15 March 2004 (aged 19)	(Royal Spanish Football Federation) Barcelona
5	DF	Yarek Gasiorowski	12 January 2005 (aged 18)	(Royal Spanish Football Federation) Valencia
6	DF	Edgar Pujol	7 August 2004 (aged 18)	(Royal Spanish Football Federation) Real Madrid
12	DF	David Jiménez	14 March 2004 (aged 19)	(Royal Spanish Football Federation) Real Madrid
14	DF	Félix Garreta	21 April 2004 (aged 19)	(Royal Spanish Football Federation) Real Betis
15	DF	Simo Keddari	3 February 2005 (aged 18)	(Royal Spanish Football Federation) Espanyol
8	MF	Manuel Ángel	15 March 2004 (aged 19)	(Royal Spanish Football Federation) Real Madrid
10	MF	**Ilias Akhomach**	16 April 2004 (aged 19)	(Royal Spanish Football Federation) Barcelona
11	MF	Dani Rodríguez	9 August 2005 (aged 17)	(Royal Spanish Football Federation) Barcelona
16	MF	Aleix Garrido	22 April 2004 (aged 19)	(Royal Spanish Football Federation) Barcelona
18	MF	Dani Pérez	26 July 2005 (aged 17)	(Royal Spanish Football Federation) Real Betis
20	MF	César Palacios	11 November 2004 (aged 18)	(Royal Spanish Football Federation) Real Madrid
7	FW	**Gonzalo García**	24 March 2004 (aged 19)	(Royal Spanish Football Federation) Real Madrid
9	FW	Víctor Barberà	20 August 2004 (aged 18)	(Royal Spanish Football Federation) Barcelona
17	FW	**Assane Diao**	7 September 2005 (aged 17)	(Royal Spanish Football Federation) Real Betis
19	FW	**Samu Omorodion**	5 May 2004 (aged 19)	(Royal Spanish Football Federation) Granada
