= 2026–27 HNK Rijeka season =

Rijeka
2026–27 season
- President: Damir Mišković
- Head coach: Víctor Sánchez (until 27 May 2026); Matjaž Kek (since 7 June 2026)
- Stadium: Rujevica
- HNL: 4th
- Croatian Cup: Quarter-finals
- UEFA Conference League: Play-off round
- Top goalscorer: League: Toni Fruk (6); All: Daniel Adu-Adjei (8)
- Highest home attendance: 7,848 v. Hajduk Split (20 September 2026)
- Lowest home attendance: 2,139 v. Gorica (22 November 2026)
- Average home league attendance: 4,541 (home league matches)
- Biggest win: 6–0 v. Vrbovec (16 September 2026)
- Biggest defeat: 1–4 v. Midtjylland (27 August 2026) and Slaven Belupo (11 October 2026)
- All statistics correct as of 22 November 2026.

The 2026–27 season is the 81st season in the existence of HNK Rijeka and the club's 36th consecutive season in the top flight of Croatian football. In addition to the domestic league, Rijeka compete in this season's editions of the Croatian Cup and the UEFA Conference League.

== Season overview ==
=== Managerial change and preparations ===
Rijeka entered the season under Matjaž Kek, who returned to the club after the departure of Víctor Sánchez on 27 May 2026. Sánchez had guided Rijeka to fourth place in the 2025–26 Croatian Football League, the Croatian Cup final and the round of 16 of the UEFA Conference League.

Kek was appointed on 7 June, returning almost eight years after the end of his first spell at the club. He signed a two-year contract with an option for a further season. During his previous tenure, Kek had led Rijeka to the 2016–17 league and cup double, two additional Croatian Cups and three UEFA Europa League group-stage appearances.

The change of coach was followed by a substantial restructuring of the squad. Among the early additions were returning forward Jakov Puljić and midfielder Ivan Ćubelić, while captain and goalkeeper Martin Zlomislić departed for Qarabağ FK. Croatian media described the summer activity as a major rebuild under Kek, including an attempt to reintegrate Niko Janković and the search for a replacement goalkeeper.

Rijeka subsequently signed Slovenian goalkeeper Igor Vekić, who had previously worked with Kek in the Slovenia national-team set-up. On 9 August, German winger Yusuf Kabadayı arrived from FC Augsburg on a season-long loan with an option to buy.

=== Start of the competitive season ===
Rijeka began their competitive campaign in the second qualifying round of the 2026–27 UEFA Conference League. They defeated Derry City 1–0 in both legs, progressing 2–0 on aggregate.

Kek's side opened their domestic league season with a 2–1 home victory over newly promoted Rudeš, with goals from Justas Lasickas and Daniel Adu-Adjei. Four days later, Rijeka defeated Ilves 1–0 in the first leg of the Conference League third qualifying round through a goal from Niko Janković. The result gave Rijeka four consecutive victories at the beginning of the season, although their narrow scorelines were attributed partly to missed chances.

In the return leg in Tampere on 13 August, Ilves took the lead through Semyon Baranov in the 64th minute, levelling the tie on aggregate. Lasickas equalised six minutes later after goalkeeper Otso Krkalić parried a long-range attempt from Mladen Devetak. The 1–1 draw sent Rijeka through 2–1 on aggregate, extending their unbeaten start to five competitive matches.

Rijeka suffered their first defeat of the season on 16 August, losing 2–0 away to Varaždin after two first-half goals from Ivan Mamut. Four days later, FC Midtjylland defeated Rijeka 2–0 in the first leg of their Conference League play-off in Herning.

Between the two play-off legs, Rijeka defeated Istra 1961 3–2 at Rujevica. An own goal by Mohamed Nasraoui and goals from Jakov Puljić and Toni Fruk gave Rijeka a three-goal lead before Istra scored twice during the final 20 minutes. In the return against Midtjylland on 27 August, Rijeka took the lead in the fourth minute, but the Danish side responded with four goals to win 4–1. Rijeka were eliminated 6–1 on aggregate, ending their European campaign in the play-off round.

Rijeka subsequently drew 0–0 away to Gorica in a match in which both sides created few goalscoring opportunities. On 1 September, the club signed Iranian international winger Mohammad Mohebi, who had become a free agent following his departure from Rostov.

On 5 September, Rijeka produced their largest victory of the season to that point, defeating Osijek 4–1 at Rujevica. After conceding the opening goal, Rijeka responded through Samuele Vignato, two goals from Adu-Adjei and a fourth from Fruk. Mohebi made his debut as a second-half substitute. The result left Rijeka fifth in the league with ten points from five matches.

=== September: domestic league and cup ===
On 7 September, Rijeka signed Swiss left-back Calixte Ligue from Venezia on loan until the end of the season, with an option to make the transfer permanent. Five days later, Rijeka drew 1–1 away to Lokomotiva at Maksimir. Tiago Dantas opened the scoring in the 52nd minute, before Marko Vešović equalised for the hosts in the 65th minute.

Rijeka began their Croatian Cup campaign on 16 September with a 6–0 victory away to Vrbovec, advancing to the round of 16. Jakov Puljić scored twice, while Alfonso Barco, Mohammad Mohebi, Niko Janković and Ante Matej Jurić each scored once.

On 20 September, Rijeka defeated Hajduk Split 3–0 at Rujevica in the first Adriatic derby of the season. Dantas and Samuele Vignato scored before half-time, with Daniel Adu-Adjei adding the third after the interval. The match attracted 7,848 spectators. Following the eighth round, Rijeka were fifth in the league with 14 points from seven matches, two points behind leaders Dinamo Zagreb.

On 22 September, the club announced that its Croatian Cup round-of-16 match away to Karlovac 1919 would be played on 20 October at Stadion Branko Čavlović-Čavlek.

=== October and November ===
Rijeka lost 4–1 away to Slaven Belupo on 11 October before beating Rudeš 2–1 on 16 October. Four days later, Daniel Adu-Adjei scored a first-half hat-trick in a 4–1 win at Karlovac 1919 that took Rijeka into the Croatian Cup quarter-finals.

After a 2–1 defeat at Dinamo Zagreb, Rijeka drew 1–1 with Varaždin and lost 3–1 at Istra 1961, where Jakov Puljić and Ante Majstorović were sent off. On 22 November, Yusuf Kabadayı scored his first competitive goal for Rijeka in the 15th minute against Gorica. Toni Fruk added the second in the 72nd minute. The 2–0 win moved Rijeka up to fourth with 21 points from 13 matches.

== Competitions ==
=== Overall ===
Competition	First match	Last match	Starting round	Final position	Record							
Competition	First match	Last match	Starting round	Final position	Pld	W	D	L	GF	GA	GD	Win %
SuperSport HNL	2 August 2026	May 2027	Matchday 1		13	6	3	4	21	18	+3	46.15
Croatian Cup	16 September 2026		First round		2	2	0	0	10	1	+9	100.00
Conference League	23 July 2026	27 August 2026	Second qualifying round	Play-off round	6	3	1	2	5	7	−2	50.00
Total					21	11	4	6	36	26	+10	52.38

Last updated: 22 November 2026
Source: Competitive match reports

=== SuperSport HNL ===
==== League table ====
Pos	Team	Pld	W	D	L	GF	GA	GD	Pts	Qualification or relegation (Note: The 2026–27 Croatian Football Cup winners qualify for the Europa League first qualifying round (or the second-placed team if the Croatian Cup winners finish first). If the Croatian Cup winners finish in the top three, the second Conference League second qualifying round spot will be passed to the fourth-placed team.)
2	Dinamo Zagreb	13	9	1	3	31	17	+14	28	Qualification to Conference League second qualifying round
3	Varaždin	14	6	4	4	19	14	+5	22	Qualification to Conference League second qualifying round
4	Rijeka	13	6	3	4	21	18	+3	21	
5	Osijek	13	6	2	5	22	18	+4	20	
6	Istra 1961	14	5	4	5	26	22	+4	19	

Updated to match(es) played on 22 November 2026. Source: SuperSport HNL
Rules for classification: 1) Points; 2) Head-to-head points; 3) Head-to-head goal difference; 4) Head-to-head goals scored (at home if two teams tied); 5) Goal difference; 6) Goals scored; 7) Play-off
(Note: Criteria 2-4 and 7 is only used if deciding champion, teams to international competition or teams for relegation and in that case criteria 6 will not be used).

==== Results summary ====
Overall								Home						Away					
Pld	W	D	L	GF	GA	GD	Pts	W	D	L	GF	GA	GD	W	D	L	GF	GA	GD
13	6	3	4	21	18	+3	21	5	1	0	15	5	+10	1	2	4	6	13	−7

Last updated: 22 November 2026.
Source: SuperSport HNL

==== Results by round ====
Rijeka’s home match against Dinamo Zagreb in round 2 was rescheduled for 3 December.

Round	1	2	3	4	5	6	7	8	9	10	11	12	13	14
Ground	H		A	H	A	H	A	H	A	A	A	H	A	H
Result	W		L	W	D	W	D	W	L	W	L	D	L	W
Position	4	5	7	5	5	5	5	5	5	5	5	5	6	4

Updated to match(es) played on 22 November 2026. Source: SuperSport HNL
A = Away; H = Home; W = Win; D = Draw; L = Loss

=== Results by opponent ===
Team	Results				Points
Team	1	2	3	4	Points
Dinamo Zagreb	–	1–2	–	–	0
Gorica	0–0	2–0	–	–	4
Hajduk Split	3–0	–	–	–	3
Istra 1961	3–2	1–3	–	–	3
Lokomotiva	1–1	–	–	–	1
Osijek	4–1	–	–	–	3
Rudeš	2–1	2–1	–	–	6
Slaven Belupo	1–4	–	–	–	0
Varaždin	0–2	1–1	–	–	1

Source: 2026–27 Croatian Football League article

== Matches ==
=== Croatian Football League ===
2 August 2026 1	Rijeka	2–1	Rudeš	Rijeka
21:00 CEST (UTC+02:00)	Lasickas 31'; Adu-Adjei 62'; Puljić (yellow card) 68'	Report	Poldrugač (yellow card) 41'; Živulić (yellow card) 65'; Vukić 70'	Stadium: Rujevica; Attendance: 4,497; Referee: Ante Terzić (Podstrana)

16 August 2026 3	Varaždin	2–0	Rijeka	Varaždin
18:30 CEST (UTC+02:00)	Sikošek (yellow card) 11'; Mamut 20' 31' (pen.); Latković (yellow card) 51'	Report	Živković (yellow card) 65'	Stadium: Varteks; Attendance: 3,424; Referee: Ivan Vukančić (Benkovac)

23 August 2026 4	Rijeka	3–2	Istra 1961	Rijeka
18:30 CEST (UTC+02:00)	Nasraoui 18' (o.g.); Puljić (penalty missed) 43' 43'; Fruk 53'	Report	Jaganjac (yellow card) 62' (goal) 72'; Frederiksen 90+3'	Stadium: Rujevica; Attendance: 5,371; Referee: Igor Pajač (Sv. Ivan Zelina)

31 August 2026 5	Gorica	0–0	Rijeka	Velika Gorica
21:00 CEST (UTC+02:00)		Report	Husić (yellow card) 58'; Ćubelić (yellow card) 82'; Puljić (yellow card) 90+2'	Stadium: Radnik; Attendance: 908; Referee: Ante Terzić (Podstrana)

5 September 2026 6	Rijeka	4–1	Osijek	Rijeka
21:00 CEST (UTC+02:00)	Vignato 21'; Adu-Adjei 33' 43'; Fruk 61'	Report	J. Ježić (yellow card) 12'; León 15'; Bukvić (yellow card) 45+1'	Stadium: Rujevica; Attendance: 4,506; Referee: Mateo Erceg (Benkovac)

12 September 2026 7	Lokomotiva	1–1	Rijeka	Zagreb
20:00 CEST (UTC+02:00)	Triantafyllou (yellow card) 24'; Vuković (yellow card) 35'; Vešović 65'	Report	Adu-Adjei (yellow card) 19'; Dantas 52'; Majstorović (yellow card) 64'; Lasickas (yellow card) 77'	Stadium: Maksimir; Attendance: 565; Referee: Ivan Vukančić (Benkovac)

20 September 2026 8	Rijeka	3–0	Hajduk Split	Rijeka
17:00 CEST (UTC+02:00)	Ćubelić (yellow card) 4'; Dantas 35'; Lasickas (yellow card) 45'; Vignato 45+3'; Adu-Adjei 58'; Pavić (yellow card) 64'	Report	Raçi (yellow card) 38'; Silić (yellow card) 45+4'; Fayad (yellow card) 75'	Stadium: Rujevica; Attendance: 7,848; Referee: Mateo Erceg (Benkovac)

11 October 2026 9	Slaven Belupo	4–1	Rijeka	Koprivnica
18:00 CEST (UTC+02:00)	Mersinaj 35'; Urata (yellow card) 43'; Banovec 52'; Nestorovski 69' 74'	Report	Dantas 7' (pen.)	Stadium: Gradski; Attendance: 1,057; Referee: Ante Terzić (Podstrana)

16 October 2026 10	Rudeš	1–2	Rijeka	Velika Gorica
18:00 CEST (UTC+02:00)	Rogić (yellow card) 45+1'; Celjak (red card) 72'; Lovrić (yellow card) 89'; Skoko 90+4'	Report	Vignato 5'; Pavić (yellow card) 36'; Fruk 74'; Janković (yellow card) 90+2'	Stadium: Radnik; Attendance: 383; Referee: Antonio Škobić (Osijek)

27 October 2026 11	Dinamo Zagreb	2–1	Rijeka	Zagreb
18:00 CET (UTC+01:00)	Stojković 35' 85'; Radeljić (yellow card) 42'	Report	Majstorović (yellow card) 37'; Vignato 63'	Stadium: Maksimir; Attendance: 7,401; Referee: Dario Bel (Osijek)

1 November 2026 12	Rijeka	1–1	Varaždin	Rijeka
15:00 CET (UTC+01:00)	Fruk 17'; Husić (yellow card) 35'; Oreč (yellow card) 49'; Vignato (yellow card) 85'; Pavić (yellow card) 90+1'	Report	Mamić (penalty missed) 37' 50'; Barać (yellow card) 90+2'; Tepšić (yellow card) 90+2' (yellow-red card) 90+2'	Stadium: Rujevica; Attendance: 2,883; Referee: Duje Strukan (Split)

7 November 2026 13	Istra 1961	3–1	Rijeka	Pula
18:00 CET (UTC+01:00)	Frederiksen 30' 45+1' (penalty missed) 84' 88'; Kumar (yellow card) 69'; Rozić (yellow card) 80'; Hodžić (yellow card) 90'	Report	Puljić (red card) 27'; Husić (yellow card) 29'; Fruk 39'; Lasickas (yellow card) 61'; Majstorović (red card) 83'	Stadium: Aldo Drosina; Attendance: 3,040; Referee: Ivan Vukančić (Benkovac)

22 November 2026 14	Rijeka	2–0	Gorica	Rijeka
18:00 CET (UTC+01:00)	Kabadayı 15'; Adu-Adjei (yellow card) 46'; Lasickas (yellow card) 59'; Živković (yellow card) 66'; Fruk 72'	Report	Brodić (yellow card) 51'; Bogojević (yellow card) 65'	Stadium: Rujevica; Attendance: 2,139; Referee: Antonio Škobić

=== Croatian Cup ===
16 September 2026 R1	Vrbovec	0–6	Rijeka	Vrbovec
16:30 CEST (UTC+02:00)	Dansou (red card) 6'	Report	Puljić 7' (pen.) 32'; Barco 13'; Mohebi 24'; Janković 62'; Jurić 79'	Stadium: Gradski stadion Attendance: 1,000; Referee: Ante Čulina (Zagreb)

20 October 2026 R2	Karlovac 1919	1–4	Rijeka	Karlovac
18:00 CEST (UTC+02:00)	Kapulica 76'; Paracki (yellow card) 79'	Report	Adu-Adjei 14' 23' 41' (yellow card) 79'; Mohebi 85'	Stadium: Branko Čavlović-Čavlek; Attendance: 1,500; Referee: Ante Terzić (Podstrana)

=== UEFA Conference League ===
23 July 2026 QR2	Rijeka (Croatia)	1–0	(Republic of Ireland) Derry City	Rijeka, Croatia
20:45 CEST (UTC+02:00)	Oreč (yellow card) 7'; Fruk 52'; Adu-Adjei (yellow card) 60'	Report		Stadium: Rujevica; Attendance: 5,844; Referee: José Luis Munuera Montero (Spain)

30 July 2026 QR2	Derry City (Republic of Ireland)	0–1 (0–2 agg.)	(Croatia) Rijeka	Derry, Northern Ireland
18:30 WEST (UTC+01:00)	Twisk (yellow card) 30'; Lyons-Foster (yellow card) 46'; Dummigan (yellow card) 69'; Burns (yellow card) 90+3'	Report	Adu-Adjei 14'; Majstorović (yellow card) 65'	Stadium: Ryan McBride Brandywell; Attendance: 3,645; Referee: João Gonçalves (Portugal)

6 August 2026 QR3	Rijeka (Croatia)	1–0	(Finland) Ilves	Rijeka, Croatia
20:45 CEST (UTC+02:00)	Pavić (yellow card) 11'; Janković 16'; Barco (yellow card) 50'	Report	Kilo (yellow card) 27'; Kanga (yellow card) 75'; Bamba (yellow card) 90+2'	Stadium: Rujevica; Attendance: 5,268; Referee: Ishmael Barbara (Malta)

13 August 2026 QR3	Ilves (Finland)	1–1 (1–2 agg.)	(Croatia) Rijeka	Tampere, Finland
19:00 EEST (UTC+03:00)	Baranov 64'	Report	Lasickas 70'; Devetak (yellow card) 87'	Stadium: Tammelan; Attendance: 5,198; Referee: Genc Nuza (Kosovo)

20 August 2026 PO	Midtjylland (Denmark)	2–0	(Croatia) Rijeka	Herning, Denmark
19:00 CEST (UTC+02:00)	Cho 20'; Johannesen 48', (yellow card) 60'	Report	Ćubelić (yellow card) 36'; Fruk (yellow card) 50'; Barco (yellow card) 89'	Stadium: MCH Arena; Attendance: 7,519; Referee: Balázs Berke (Hungary)

27 August 2026 PO	Rijeka (Croatia)	1–4 (1–6 agg.)	(Denmark) Midtjylland	Rijeka, Croatia
20:45 CEST (UTC+02:00)	Erlić 4' (o.g.); Lasickas (yellow card) 13'; Puljić (yellow card) 70'; Majstorović (yellow card) 74'	Report	Iheanacho 17'; Sørensen (yellow card) 48'; Osorio 51'; Jensen 56'; Cho 78'	Stadium: Rujevica; Attendance: 6,352; Referee: Jasper Vergoote (Belgium)

=== Friendlies ===
==== Pre-season ====
27 June 2026 Friendly	Rijeka (Croatia)	2–1	(Slovenia) Bravo	Kranjska Gora, Slovenia
18:30 CEST (UTC+02:00)	Dantas 28' (pen.); Majstorović 35'	Report	Nuhanović 46' (pen.)	Stadium: SRC Ruteč; Attendance: Behind closed doors Referee: Anže Jerič (Kranj)

30 June 2026 Friendly	Brinje Grosuplje (Slovenia)	0–3	(Croatia) Rijeka	Kranjska Gora, Slovenia
18:30 CEST (UTC+02:00)		Report	Puljić 24'; Gojak 35' 54'	Stadium: SRC Ruteč; Attendance: Behind closed doors Referee: Anže Jerič (Kranj)

3 July 2026 Friendly	Radomlje (Slovenia)	0–2	(Croatia) Rijeka	Radomlje, Slovenia
18:00 CEST (UTC+02:00)		Report	Barco 31'; Puljić 84'; Majstorović (yellow card); Oreč (yellow card)	Stadium: Sports park Radomlje; Attendance: Behind closed doors Referee: Rade Obrenović (Ljubljana)

10 July 2026 Friendly	Mura (Slovenia)	2–1	(Croatia) Rijeka	Murska Sobota, Slovenia
19:00 CEST (UTC+02:00)	Proleta 56'; Kouter 90'	Report	Barco 33'	Stadium: Fazanerija; Attendance: Behind closed doors Referee: Slavko Nemet (Murska Sobota)

16 July 2026 Friendly	Rijeka (Croatia)	2–0	(Slovenia) Jadran Dekani	Rijeka, Croatia
20:00 CEST (UTC+02:00)	Fruk 21'; Gojak 52'	Report		Stadium: Rujevica; Attendance: 1,500; Referee: Mario Prpić (Rijeka)

==== In-season (2026) ====
26 September 2026 Friendly	Rijeka (Croatia)	0–1	(Germany) Union Berlin	Rijeka, Croatia
19:17 CEST (UTC+02:00)		Report	Skarke 6'	Stadium: Kantrida; Attendance: 7,872; Referee: Antonio Melnjak (Rijeka)

2 October 2026 Friendly	Opatija	0–2	Rijeka	Opatija
19:00 CEST (UTC+02:00)		Report	Puljić 40'; Oreč 73'	Stadium: Gradski; Attendance: 1,000; Referee: Marin Rožman (Rijeka)

13 November 2026 Friendly	Rijeka	4–0	Orijent	Rijeka
15:00 CET (UTC+01:00)	Fruk 32'; Jurić 34' (pen.); Bodetić 40'; Gojak 86'	Report		Stadium: Rujevica; Attendance: 150; Referee: Ivan Šantić (Rijeka)

== Player seasonal records ==
Updated 22 November 2026. Competitive matches only.

=== Goals ===
Rank	Name	League	Europe	Cup	Total
1	(Ghana) Daniel Adu-Adjei	4	1	3	8
2	(Croatia) Toni Fruk	6	1	–	7
3	(Italy) Samuele Vignato	4	–	–	4
4	(Portugal) Tiago Dantas	3	–	–	3
4	(Croatia) Jakov Puljić	1	–	2	3
6	(Lithuania) Justas Lasickas	1	1	–	2
6	(Croatia) Niko Janković	–	1	1	2
6	(Iran) Mohammad Mohebi	–	–	2	2
9	(Germany) Yusuf Kabadayı	1	–	–	1
9	(Peru) Alfonso Barco	–	–	1	1
9	(Croatia) Ante Matej Jurić	–	–	1	1
Own goals		1	1	–	2
TOTALS		21	5	10	36

Source: Competitive matches

=== Clean sheets ===
Rank	Name	League	Europe	Cup	Total
1	(Slovenia) Igor Vekić	3	–	1	4
2	(Serbia) Aleksa Todorović	–	3	–	3
TOTALS		3	3	1	7

Source: Competitive matches

=== Disciplinary record ===
Number	Position	Player	HNL			Europe			Croatian Cup			Total		
Number	Position	Player	Yellow card	(yellow card) (yellow-red card)	Red card	Yellow card	(yellow card) (yellow-red card)	Red card	Yellow card	(yellow card) (yellow-red card)	Red card	Yellow card	(yellow card) (yellow-red card)	Red card
3	DF	(Croatia) Moreno Živković	2	0	0	0	0	0	0	0	0	2	0	0
4	MF	(Croatia) Niko Janković	1	0	0	0	0	0	0	0	0	1	0	0
5	MF	(Peru) Alfonso Barco	0	0	0	2	0	0	0	0	0	2	0	0
6	MF	(Croatia) Branko Pavić	3	0	0	1	0	0	0	0	0	4	0	0
8	MF	(Croatia) Ivan Ćubelić	2	0	0	1	0	0	0	0	0	3	0	0
10	MF	(Croatia) Toni Fruk	0	0	0	1	0	0	0	0	0	1	0	0
18	FW	(Ghana) Daniel Adu-Adjei	2	0	0	1	0	0	1	0	0	4	0	0
19	MF	(Italy) Samuele Vignato	1	0	0	0	0	0	0	0	0	1	0	0
21	FW	(Croatia) Jakov Puljić	2	0	1	1	0	0	0	0	0	3	0	1
22	DF	(Croatia) Ante Oreč	1	0	0	1	0	0	0	0	0	2	0	0
23	DF	(Lithuania) Justas Lasickas	4	0	0	1	0	0	0	0	0	5	0	0
34	DF	(Serbia) Mladen Devetak	0	0	0	1	0	0	0	0	0	1	0	0
45	DF	(Croatia) Ante Majstorović	2	0	1	2	0	0	0	0	0	4	0	1
51	DF	(Switzerland) Anel Husić	3	0	0	0	0	0	0	0	0	3	0	0
TOTALS			23	0	2	12	0	0	1	0	0	36	0	2

Source: Official competitive match reports

=== Appearances and goals ===
Number	Position	Player	Total		HNL		Conference League		Croatian Cup	
Number	Position	Player	Apps	Goals	Apps	Goals	Apps	Goals	Apps	Goals
3	DF	(Croatia) Moreno Živković	3	0	1+1	0	0+0	0	1+0	0
4	MF	(Croatia) Niko Janković	16	2	6+3	0	6+0	1	1+0	1
5	MF	(Peru) Alfonso Barco	13	1	3+4	0	5+0	0	1+0	1
6	MF	(Croatia) Branko Pavić	20	0	11+1	0	6+0	0	2+0	0
7	FW	(Germany) Yusuf Kabadayı	6	1	1+2	1	0+2	0	1+0	0
8	MF	(Croatia) Ivan Ćubelić	19	0	6+6	0	1+4	0	0+2	0
9	FW	(Iran) Mohammad Mohebi	9	2	1+6	0	0+0	0	1+1	2
10	MF	(Croatia) Toni Fruk	19	7	11+2	6	5+0	1	1+0	0
11	FW	(Croatia) Gabriel Rukavina	4	0	2+0	0	0+2	0	0+0	0
13	GK	(Slovenia) Igor Vekić	12	0	10+0	0	0+0	0	2+0	0
14	MF	(Bosnia and Herzegovina) Amer Gojak	19	0	2+9	0	3+3	0	2+0	0
15	FW	(Croatia) Goran Grulović	5	0	0+1	0	0+2	0	0+2	0
18	FW	(Ghana) Daniel Adu-Adjei	20	8	11+2	4	6+0	1	1+0	3
19	MF	(Italy) Samuele Vignato	11	4	9+0	4	1+1	0	0+0	0
21	FW	(Croatia) Jakov Puljić	15	3	3+6	1	1+3	0	1+1	2
22	DF	(Croatia) Ante Oreč	20	0	11+1	0	6+0	0	1+1	0
23	DF	(Lithuania) Justas Lasickas	20	2	9+3	1	2+4	1	2+0	0
26	MF	(Portugal) Tiago Dantas	20	3	13+0	3	6+0	0	1+0	0
34	DF	(Serbia) Mladen Devetak	18	0	7+4	0	5+0	0	2+0	0
45	DF	(Croatia) Ante Majstorović	19	0	12+0	0	6+0	0	1+0	0
51	DF	(Switzerland) Anel Husić	13	0	11+0	0	1+0	0	1+0	0
77	FW	(Croatia) Ante Matej Jurić	11	1	0+6	0	0+3	0	0+2	1
91	DF	(Croatia) Noel Bodetić	3	0	0+2	0	0+0	0	0+1	0
99	GK	(Serbia) Aleksa Todorović	9	0	3+0	0	6+0	0	0+0	0

Competition appearances are shown as starts + substitute appearances.
Source: Official competitive match reports

=== Suspensions ===
Date Incurred	Competition	Player	Length of ban	Reason
7 Nov 2026	HNL	(Croatia) Ante Majstorović	2	Red card
7 Nov 2026	HNL	(Croatia) Jakov Puljić	2	Red card
22 Nov 2026	HNL	(Lithuania) Justas Lasickas	1	Yellow card

=== Penalties ===
For
Date	Competition	Player	Opposition	Scored?
23 Aug 2026	HNL	(Croatia) Jakov Puljić	Istra 1961	✗
16 Sep 2026	Cup	(Croatia) Jakov Puljić	Vrbovec	✓
11 Oct 2026	HNL	(Portugal) Tiago Dantas	Slaven Belupo	✓
Against
Date	Competition	Goalkeeper	Opposition	Scored?
16 Aug 2026	HNL	(Serbia) Aleksa Todorović	Varaždin	✓
1 Nov 2026	HNL	(Slovenia) Igor Vekić	Varaždin	✗
7 Nov 2026	HNL	(Slovenia) Igor Vekić	Istra 1961	✗

== Transfers ==
=== In ===
Date	Pos.	Player	Moving from	Type	Fee	Ref.
2 Jun 2026	CF	(Croatia) Jakov Puljić	(Croatia) Vukovar 1991	Transfer	Free	
16 Jun 2026	AM	(Croatia) Ivan Ćubelić	(Croatia) Slaven Belupo	Transfer	€300,000 (reported)	
26 Jun 2026	GK	(Croatia) Domagoj Ivan Marić	(Croatia) Karlovac 1919	Return from loan	—N/a	
26 Jun 2026	CB	(Croatia) Petar Raguž	(Croatia) Karlovac 1919	Return from loan	—N/a	
26 Jun 2026	LW	(Croatia) Dominik Simčić	(Croatia) Karlovac 1919	Return from loan	—N/a	
30 Jun 2026	CB	(North Macedonia) Jovan Manev	(Serbia) Novi Pazar	Return from loan	—N/a	
30 Jun 2026	AM	(Bulgaria) Dominik Yankov	(Bulgaria) Lokomotiv Sofia	Return from loan	—N/a	
30 Jun 2026	RW	(Croatia) Šimun Butić	(Croatia) Vukovar 1991	Return from loan	—N/a	
30 Jun 2026	CF	(Croatia) Marko Aščić	(Croatia) Slaven Belupo	Transfer	Undisclosed	
30 Jun 2026	CF	(Croatia) Dominik Dogan	(Bosnia and Herzegovina) Velež Mostar	Return from loan	—N/a	
15 Jul 2026	AM	(Croatia) Niko Janković	(Slovakia) Slovan Bratislava	Return from loan	—N/a	
17 Jul 2026	CB	(Croatia) Moreno Živković	(Croatia) Dinamo Zagreb	Transfer	Free	
18 Jul 2026	GK	(Croatia) Maroje Kostopeč	(Croatia) Lokomotiva Zagreb	Transfer	Free	
5 Aug 2026	GK	(Slovenia) Igor Vekić	(Denmark) Vejle	Transfer	Undisclosed	
9 Aug 2026	LW	(Germany) Yusuf Kabadayı	(Germany) Augsburg	Loan (until 30/6/2027; option to buy)	—N/a	
1 Sep 2026	LW	(Iran) Mohammad Mohebi	(Russia) Rostov	Transfer	Free	
7 Sep 2026	LB	(Switzerland) Calixte Ligue	(Italy) Venezia	Loan (until 30/6/2027; option to buy)	—N/a	

Source: Glasilo Hrvatskog nogometnog saveza

=== Out ===
Date	Pos.	Player	Moving to	Type	Fee	Ref.
9 Jun 2026	CF	(Croatia) Duje Čop	—N/a	Retirement	—N/a	
21 Jun 2026	GK	(Bosnia and Herzegovina) Martin Zlomislić	(Azerbaijan) Qarabağ	Transfer	€500,000 (reported)	
30 Jun 2026	GK	(Croatia) Josip Jurčević	TBC	End of contract	Free	
30 Jun 2026	LB	(Croatia) Mile Škorić	(Croatia) Sloga Novi Mikanovci	End of contract	Free	
30 Jun 2026	CB	(Bosnia and Herzegovina) Stjepan Radeljić	(Croatia) Dinamo Zagreb	End of contract	Free	
30 Jun 2026	CM	(Slovenia) Dejan Petrovič	(Malaysia) Johor Darul Ta'zim	End of contract	Free	
30 Jun 2026	RW	(North Macedonia) Matej Momčilovski	TBC	End of contract	Free	
1 Jul 2026	LW	(Croatia) Dominik Simčić	(Bosnia and Herzegovina) Široki Brijeg	End of contract	Free	
2 Jul 2026	RW	(Croatia) Šimun Butić	(Slovenia) Mura	Loan (until 30/6/2027)	—N/a	
7 Jul 2026	GK	(Croatia) Niko Vučetić	(Croatia) Orijent	End of contract	Free	
7 Jul 2026	CM	(Croatia) Rajan Žlibanović	(Austria) Kapfenberger SV	Loan (until 30/6/2027)	—N/a	
9 Jul 2026	CB	(Croatia) Bruno Burčul	(Slovenia) Radomlje	End of contract	Free	
10 Jul 2026	CF	(Croatia) Marko Aščić	(Slovenia) Mura	Loan (until 30/6/2027)	—N/a	
16 Jul 2026	CB	(North Macedonia) Jovan Manev	(North Macedonia) Shkëndija	Released (mutual consent)	Free	
18 Jul 2026	AM	(Bulgaria) Dominik Yankov	(Bulgaria) Arda Kardzhali	Released (mutual consent)	Free	
21 Jul 2026	CB	(Croatia) Lovro Kitin	(Slovenia) Mura	Loan (until 30/6/2027)	—N/a	
22 Jul 2026	AM	(Republic of the Congo) Merveil Ndockyt	(Morocco) AS FAR	Transfer	Undisclosed	
24 Jul 2026	RW	(Croatia) Dominik Thaqi	(Croatia) Lokomotiva Zagreb	Loan (until 30/6/2027)	—N/a	
11 Aug 2026	AM	(Croatia) Petar Raguž	(Croatia) Karlovac 1919	Released (mutual consent)	Free	
12 Aug 2026	GK	(Croatia) Maroje Kostopeč	(Croatia) Karlovac 1919	Loan (until 30/6/2027)	—N/a	
12 Aug 2026	CF	(Croatia) Dominik Dogan	(Croatia) Karlovac 1919	Loan (until 30/6/2027)	—N/a	
18 Aug 2026	GK	(Croatia) Domagoj Ivan Marić	(Croatia) Orijent	Dual registration	—N/a	
18 Aug 2026	CB	(Croatia) Roko Valinčić	(Croatia) Orijent	Dual registration	—N/a	
19 Aug 2026	GK	(Croatia) Vito Kovač	(Croatia) Opatija	Dual registration	—N/a	
19 Aug 2026	GK	(Nigeria) David Nwolokor	(Croatia) Opatija	Dual registration	—N/a	
28 Aug 2026	CF	(The Gambia) Cherno Saho	(Croatia) Rudeš	Loan (until 30/6/2027)	—N/a	
31 Aug 2026	LW	(Georgia (country)) Tornike Morchiladze	(Spain) Lugo	Released (mutual consent)	Free	
3 Sep 2026	LB	(Ivory Coast) Dimitri Legbo	(Azerbaijan) Zira	Transfer	Undisclosed	
4 Sep 2026	LW	(Croatia) Gabriel Rukavina	(Portugal) Arouca	Transfer	Undisclosed	
7 Sep 2026	CM	(Nigeria) Simon Karshe Cletus	(Croatia) Grobničan	Dual registration	—N/a	
7 Sep 2026	CF	(The Gambia) Alasana Samateh	(Croatia) Grobničan	Dual registration	—N/a	

Source: Glasilo Hrvatskog nogometnog saveza

Spending: ▼€300,000
Income: ▲€500,000
Expenditure: ▲€200,000
