= Diogo Pinto (footballer, born 2004) =

Portuguese footballer (born 2004)

Personal information
- Full name: Diogo de Carvalho Pinto
- Date of birth: 18 June 2004 (age 22)
- Place of birth: Felgueiras, Portugal
- Height: 1.95 m (6 ft 5 in)
- Position: Goalkeeper

Team information
- Current team: Estrela da Amadora
- Number: 51

Youth career
- 2012–2016: Felgueiras 1932
- 2016–2017: Paços de Ferreira
- 2017–2022: Sporting CP

Senior career*
Years	Team	Apps	(Gls)
2022–2025	Sporting CP B	17	(0)
2024–2025	Sporting CP	2	(0)
2025–	Estrela da Amadora	0	(0)

International career^{‡}
2019	Portugal U15	2	(0)
2019–2020	Portugal U16	7	(0)
2021–2022	Portugal U18	5	(0)
2022–2023	Portugal U19	3	(0)
2022–2023	Portugal U20	3	(0)
2025–	Portugal U21	1	(0)
Medal record
Men's football
Representing Portugal
UEFA European Under-19 Championship
Runner-up	2023 Malta
- * Club domestic league appearances and goals as of 20:22, 6 July 2025 (UTC) ‡ National team caps and goals as of 00:02, 28 May 2024 (UTC)

Diogo de Carvalho Pinto (born 18 June 2004) is a Portuguese professional footballer who plays as a goalkeeper for Primeira Liga club Estrela da Amadora.

== Career ==
Pinto is a youth product of Felgueiras 1932 and Paços de Ferreira, before moving to the youth academy of Sporting CP in 2017. He signed his first professional contract with the club in October 2020, and in 2022 was promoted to Sporting CP B in the Liga 3. He made his senior and professional debut with Sporting in a 1–0 Primeira Liga win over Estoril on 11 May 2024. He was the starting goalkeeper for Sporting for the 2023–24 Taça de Portugal final, a 2–1 loss to FC Porto on 26 May 2024.

== International career ==
Pinto is a youth international for Portugal from U16 to U20 level. He played for the Portugal U19 at the 2023 UEFA European Under-19 Championship. In March 2024, he was called up to the Portugal U20s for a set of 2025 UEFA European Under-21 Championship qualification matches.

== Career statistics ==
As of match played 18 October 2025

Appearances and goals by club, season and competition
Club	Season	League			National cup		League cup		Europe		Other		Total	
Club	Season	Division	Apps	Goals	Apps	Goals	Apps	Goals	Apps	Goals	Apps	Goals	Apps	Goals
Sporting CP B	2022–23	Liga 3	4	0	—		—		—		—		4	0
Sporting CP B	2023–24	Liga 3	8	0	—		—		—		—		8	0
Sporting CP B	2024–25	Liga 3	5	0	—		—		—		—		5	0
Sporting CP B	Total		17	0	—		—		—		—		17	0
Sporting CP	2023–24	Primeira Liga	2	0	1	0	0	0	0	0	—		3	0
Sporting CP	2024–25	Primeira Liga	0	0	0	0	0	0	0	0	0	0	0	0
Sporting CP	Total		2	0	1	0	0	0	0	0	0	0	3	0
Estrela da Amadora	2025–26	Primeira Liga	0	0	1	0	—		—		—		1	0
Career total			19	0	2	0	0	0	0	0	0	0	21	0

== Honours ==
Sporting CP

- Primeira Liga: 2023–24
