= Oliwier Zych =

Polish footballer (born 2004)

Personal information
- Full name: Oliwier Zych
- Date of birth: 28 June 2004 (age 22)
- Place of birth: Gdynia, Poland
- Height: 1.93 m (6 ft 4 in)
- Position: Goalkeeper

Team information
- Current team: Vitória (on loan from Aston Villa)
- Number: 48

Youth career
- 2015–2018: Arka Gdynia
- 2018–2020: Zagłębie Lubin
- 2020–2023: Aston Villa

Senior career*
Years	Team	Apps	(Gls)
2023–	Aston Villa	0	(0)
2023–2024	→ Puszcza Niepołomice (loan)	26	(0)
2025–2026	→ Raków Częstochowa (loan)	19	(0)
2025	→ Raków Częstochowa II (loan)	3	(0)
2026–	→ Vitória (loan)	8	(0)

International career^{‡}
- Poland U14
2018–2019	Poland U15	4	(0)
2019–2020	Poland U16	5	(0)
2022	Poland U18	3	(0)
2022–2023	Poland U19	10	(0)
2023–2024	Poland U20	3	(0)
2024–	Poland U21	2	(0)
- * Club domestic league appearances and goals as of 09:17, 14 October 2026 (UTC) ‡ National team caps and goals as of 21:24, 19 November 2026 (UTC)

Oliwier "Oli" Zych (born 28 June 2004) is a Polish professional footballer who plays as a goalkeeper for Primeira Liga club Vitória, on loan from Premier League club Aston Villa.

Zych is a product of the Aston Villa Academy, having spent time as a junior in the academies of Arka Gdynia and Zagłębie Lubin in his native Poland. He has appeared internationally at youth level for Poland at multiple levels, most recently for their U21 side. He was called up to the Poland senior team's provisional squad for UEFA Euro 2024, but withdrew due to injury.

== Club career ==
=== Youth career in Poland ===
Zych spent time in the youth system of Arka Gdynia, before continuing his football career at Zagłębie Lubin, working through the youth academy. In August 2020, after being scouted by Liverpool, Arsenal and Bayern Munich, Zych was signed by Premier League club Aston Villa, joining their academy.

=== Aston Villa ===
In 2021, Zych was part of the Aston Villa U18 squad that won the FA Youth Cup. In August 2021, he was given a professional contract by the club.

On 13 October 2022, Zych signed a contract extension with Villa.

Zych was named in Aston Villa's pre-season squad for their tour of the United States of America in July 2024. He played his first senior minutes for Villa on 27 July 2024, coming on at half-time in a 4–1 defeat to Columbus Crew in Ohio, conceding a single goal to Dylan Chambost.

==== Loan to Puszcza Niepołomice ====
On 4 September 2023, Zych signed for Polish top flight club Puszcza Niepołomice on a season-long loan. He made his Ekstraklasa debut on 15 September, in a 3–1 defeat to Śląsk Wrocław. On 1 April 2024, in a 1–1 home draw against Radomiak Radom, Zych was beaten by a clearance by Radomiak's goalkeeper Gabriel Kobylak from outside his box. Despite this, Zych received praise for his performances across the 2023–24 season, resulting in a nomination for the Ekstraklasa Goalkeeper of the Season award in May 2024. He returned to England at the conclusion of the season.

==== Loan to Raków Częstochowa ====
On 14 July 2025, Zych signed for Raków Częstochowa on loan from Aston Villa. Having been on the bench for Raków behind first choice goalkeeper Kacper Trelowski at the start of the campaign, Zych played for Raków's B team in the IV liga in August 2025. He made 29 appearances for Raków's senior team across the season, keeping nine clean sheets. He returned to Aston Villa at the end of the season.

==== Loan to Vitória ====
On 15 July 2026, Zych signed for fellow V Sports club Vitória on a season-long loan.

== International career ==
In 2019, Zych was named in the Poland U15 squad that was invited to join the 2019 South American U-15 Championship, however Poland ultimately withdrew from the tournament.

On 7 February 2023, Zych was called up to a Poland U19 training camp for the first time, going on to captain the team in a 3–2 friendly victory over Czech Republic.

On 26 June 2023, he was named in the Poland U19 squad for the 2023 UEFA European Under-19 Championship.

In May 2024, Zych received his first under-21 call-up for a friendly against North Macedonia on 1 June 2024. Later that month, Zych received his first call-up to the senior team, being named in Poland's provisional squad for UEFA Euro 2024. His debut for the under-21 side only lasted twelve minutes – he was substituted in the 57th minute after picking up an injury while conceding the second goal in a 1–2 loss, which ruled him out of the tournament.

== Career statistics ==
As of match played 11 October 2026

Appearances and goals by club, season, and competition
Club	Season	League			National cup (Note: Includes Polish Cup)		League cup		Europe		Other		Total	
Club	Season	Division	Apps	Goals	Apps	Goals	Apps	Goals	Apps	Goals	Apps	Goals	Apps	Goals
Aston Villa	2021–22	Premier League	0	0	0	0	0	0	—		3 (Note: Appearances in EFL Trophy)	0	3	0
Aston Villa	2022–23	Premier League	0	0	0	0	0	0	—		0	0	0	0
Aston Villa	2023–24	Premier League	0	0	0	0	0	0	0	0	0	0	0	0
Aston Villa	2024–25	Premier League	0	0	0	0	0	0	0	0	4	0	4	0
Aston Villa	2025–26	Premier League	0	0	0	0	0	0	0	0	0	0	0	0
Aston Villa	2026–27	Premier League	0	0	0	0	0	0	0	0	0	0	0	0
Aston Villa	Total		0	0	0	0	0	0	0	0	7	0	7	0
Puszcza Niepołomice (loan)	2023–24	Ekstraklasa	26	0	0	0	—		—		—		26	0
Raków Częstochowa (loan)	2025–26	Ekstraklasa	19	0	4	0	—		6 (Note: Appearances in UEFA Conference League)	0	—		29	0
Raków Częstochowa II (loan)	2025–26	IV liga Silesia	3	0	—		—		—		—		3	0
Vitória (loan)	2026–27	Primeira Liga	8	0	0	0	0	0	—		—		8	0
Career total			56	0	4	0	0	0	6	0	7	0	73	0

== Honours ==
Aston Villa U18

- FA Youth Cup: 2020–21

Individual

- Ekstraklasa Young Player of the Month: May 2024
