= Amer Gojak =

Bosnian footballer (born 1997)

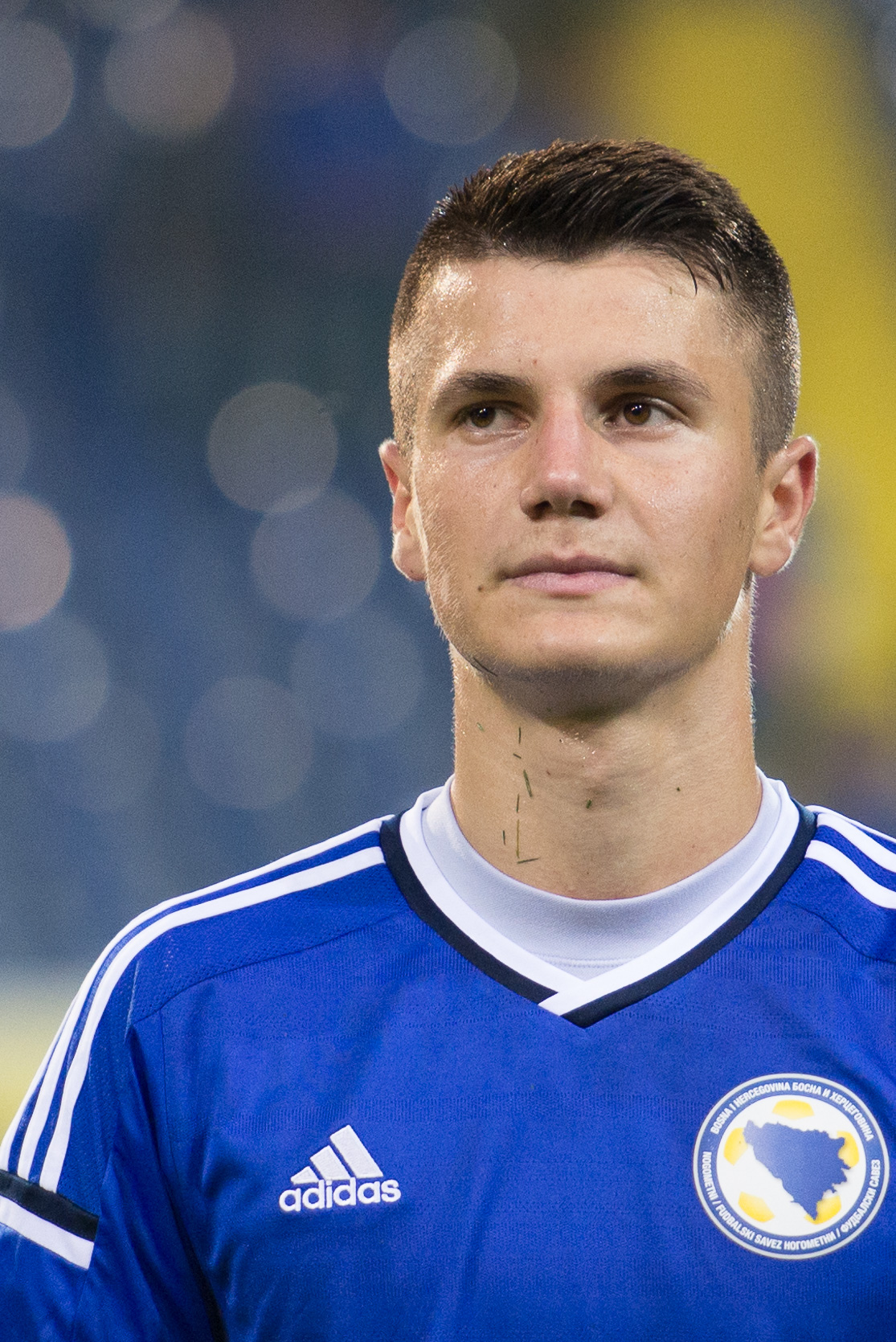
- Gojak with Bosnia and Herzegovina U21 in 2014

Personal information
- Date of birth: 13 February 1997 (age 29)
- Place of birth: Sarajevo, Bosnia and Herzegovina
- Height: 1.84 m (6 ft 0 in)
- Position: Midfielder

Team information
- Current team: Rijeka
- Number: 14

Youth career
- 2005–2009: Novi Grad Sarajevo
- 2009–2014: Željezničar

Senior career*
Years	Team	Apps	(Gls)
2014–2015	Olimpic	19	(4)
2015–2022	Dinamo Zagreb	133	(12)
2020–2021	→ Torino (loan)	15	(1)
2022–2024	Ferencváros	25	(2)
2024–	Rijeka	58	(2)

International career
2012–2014	Bosnia and Herzegovina U17	19	(9)
2014–2015	Bosnia and Herzegovina U19	20	(8)
2014–2018	Bosnia and Herzegovina U21	19	(4)
2018–2022	Bosnia and Herzegovina	35	(4)
- * Club domestic league appearances and goals as of 23 May 2026

Amer Gojak (pronounced [ǎmer ɡǒjak]; born 13 February 1997) is a Bosnian professional footballer who plays as a midfielder for Croatian Football League club Rijeka.

Gojak started his professional career at Olimpic, before joining Dinamo Zagreb in 2015, who loaned him to Torino in 2020. In 2022, he moved to Ferencváros. In 2024, he signed with Rijeka.

A former youth international for Bosnia and Herzegovina, Gojak made his senior international debut in 2018, earning over 30 caps until 2022.

== Club career ==
=== Early career ===
Gojak started playing football at a local club, before joining the youth academy of his hometown team Željezničar in 2009. In January 2014, he switched to Olimpic. He made his professional debut against Velež on 1 March at the age of 17. On 15 March, he scored his first professional goal against Rudar Prijedor, which secured the victory for his squad.

=== Dinamo Zagreb ===
In May, Gojak was transferred to Croatian outfit Dinamo Zagreb for an undisclosed fee. He made his official debut for the team in a Croatian Cup game against Istra 1961 on 3 March 2015. Three weeks later, he made his league debut against the same opponent. He won his first title with the club on 2 May, when they were crowned league champions. On 14 May 2016, he scored his first goal for Dinamo Zagreb in a triumph over Lokomotiva.

Gojak debuted in the UEFA Champions League away at Lyon on 14 September.

In March 2017, he extended his contract with the squad until June 2023.

He scored four goals in a defeat of Cibalia on 29 April.

Gojak played his 100th match for the side against their biggest rivals Hajduk Split on 26 May 2019.

In October 2020, he was loaned to Italian outfit Torino until the end of the season.

He made his 200th appearance for Dinamo Zagreb on 15 May 2022 against Šibenik.

=== Ferencváros ===
In August, Gojak signed a three-year deal with Hungarian team Ferencváros. He made his competitive debut for the squad on 4 September against Újpest. On 18 September, he scored his first goal for Ferencváros in a Magyar Kupa tie against Bicskei. Seven months later, he scored a brace in a defeat of Újpest, which were his first league goals for the side. He won his first trophy with the club on 5 May 2023, when they secured league title.

=== Rijeka ===
In September 2024, Gojak moved to Rijeka on a contract until June 2026. On 14 September, he debuted officially for the team against Gorica. He won his first piece of silverware with the club on 25 May 2025, when they were proclaimed league winners. On 30 July, he scored his first goal for Rijeka in a UEFA Champions League qualifier against Ludogorets. Nine months later, he scored a brace in a victory over Gorica, and they were his first league goals for the squad.

In July 2026, he penned a new two-year deal with the side.

== International career ==
Gojak represented Bosnia and Herzegovina at all youth levels.

In March 2017, he received his first senior call up, for a 2018 FIFA World Cup qualifier against Gibraltar and a friendly game against Albania, but had to wait until 15 November 2018 to make his debut in a 2018–19 UEFA Nations League B match against Austria.

On 5 September 2019, in a UEFA Euro 2020 qualifier against Liechtenstein, Gojak scored a brace, his first senior international goals.

== Personal life ==
Gojak married his long-time girlfriend Irma in April 2022. Together they have two daughters named Uma and Dunja.

He is a practising Muslim; together with a then teammate Izet Hajrović he visited a mosque in Zagreb.

== Career statistics ==
=== Club ===
As of match played 23 May 2026

Appearances and goals by club, season and competition
Club	Season	League			National cup (Note: Includes Bosnian Cup, Croatian Cup, Coppa Italia, Magyar Kupa)		Continental		Other		Total	
Club	Season	Division	Apps	Goals	Apps	Goals	Apps	Goals	Apps	Goals	Apps	Goals
Olimpic	2013–14	Bosnian Premier League	8	2	1	0	–		–		9	2
Olimpic	2014–15	Bosnian Premier League	11	2	2	0	–		–		13	2
Olimpic	Total		19	4	3	0	–		–		22	4
Dinamo Zagreb	2014–15	Croatian Football League	1	0	1	0	–		–		2	0
Dinamo Zagreb	2015–16	Croatian Football League	5	1	2	0	0	0	–		7	1
Dinamo Zagreb	2016–17	Croatian Football League	22	4	6	0	3 (Note: Appearances in UEFA Champions League)	0	–		31	4
Dinamo Zagreb	2017–18	Croatian Football League	22	1	4	0	4 (Note: Appearances in UEFA Europa League)	0	–		30	1
Dinamo Zagreb	2018–19	Croatian Football League	25	2	2	0	16 (Note: Six appearances in UEFA Champions League; ten appearances, two goals in UEFA Europa League)	2	–		43	4
Dinamo Zagreb	2019–20	Croatian Football League	27	2	1	0	11	2	1 (Note: Appearance in Croatian Super Cup)	1	40	5
Dinamo Zagreb	2020–21	Croatian Football League	5	0	1	1	3 (Note: Two appearances, one goal in UEFA Champions League; one appearance in UEFA Europa League)	1	–		9	2
Dinamo Zagreb	2021–22	Croatian Football League	24	1	3	1	12 (Note: Four appearances in UEFA Champions League; eight appearances in UEFA Europa League)	0	–		39	2
Dinamo Zagreb	2022–23	Croatian Football League	2	1	0	0	4	0	0	0	6	1
Dinamo Zagreb	Total		133	12	20	2	53	5	1	1	207	20
Torino (loan)	2020–21	Serie A	15	1	2	0	–		–		17	1
Ferencváros	2022–23	Nemzeti Bajnokság I	19	2	2	1	7	0	–		28	3
Ferencváros	2023–24	Nemzeti Bajnokság I	6	0	2	0	2 (Note: One appearance in UEFA Champions League; one appearance in UEFA Conference League)	0	–		10	0
Ferencváros	Total		25	2	4	1	9	0	–		38	3
Rijeka	2024–25	Croatian Football League	28	0	6	0	–		–		34	0
Rijeka	2025–26	Croatian Football League	30	2	4	2	10 (Note: Two appearances, one goal in UEFA Champions League; one appearance in UEFA Europa League; seven appearances in UEFA Conference League)	1	–		44	5
Rijeka	2026–27	Croatian Football League	0	0	0	0	0	0	–		0	0
Rijeka	Total		58	2	10	2	10	1	–		78	5
Career total			250	21	39	5	72	6	1	1	362	33

=== International ===
Appearances and goals by national team and year
National team	Year	Apps	Goals
Bosnia and Herzegovina
Bosnia and Herzegovina	2018	2	0
Bosnia and Herzegovina	2019	8	4
Bosnia and Herzegovina	2020	8	0
Bosnia and Herzegovina	2021	9	0
Bosnia and Herzegovina	2022	8	0
Total		35	4

Scores and results list Bosnia and Herzegovina's goal tally first, score column indicates score after each Gojak goal.

List of international goals scored by Amer Gojak
No.	Date	Venue	Cap	Opponent	Score	Result	Competition
1	5 September 2019	Bilino Polje, Zenica, Bosnia and Herzegovina	7	Liechtenstein	1–0	5–0	UEFA Euro 2020 qualifying
2	5 September 2019	Bilino Polje, Zenica, Bosnia and Herzegovina	7	Liechtenstein	5–0	5–0	UEFA Euro 2020 qualifying
3	8 September 2019	Vazgen Sargsyan Republican Stadium, Yerevan, Armenia	8	Armenia	2–2	2–4	UEFA Euro 2020 qualifying
4	15 October 2019	Olympic Stadium, Athens, Greece	10	Greece	1–1	1–2	UEFA Euro 2020 qualifying

== Honours ==
Dinamo Zagreb

- Croatian Football League: 2014–15, 2015–16, 2017–18, 2018–19, 2019–20, 2021–22
- Croatian Cup: 2014–15, 2015–16, 2017–18
- Croatian Super Cup: 2019, 2022

Ferencváros

- Nemzeti Bajnokság I: 2022–23, 2023–24

Rijeka

- Croatian Football League: 2024–25
- Croatian Cup: 2024–25
