= Joaquim Milheiro =

Portuguese football manager (born 1979)

Personal information
- Full name: Joaquim Alberto Costa Milheiro e Silva
- Date of birth: 8 February 1979 (age 47)
- Place of birth: Santa Maria da Feira, Portugal
- Position: Midfielder

Team information
- Current team: Benfica (academy director)

Youth career
- 1991–1998: Fiães

Senior career*
Years	Team	Apps	(Gls)
1998–1999	Fiães		

Managerial career
- 2018–2019: Portugal U15
- 2019–2020: Portugal U16
- 2020–2021: Portugal U17
- 2021–2022: Portugal U18
- 2022–2023: Portugal U19
- * Club domestic league appearances and goals

Joaquim Alberto Costa Milheiro e Silva (born 8 February 1979) is a Portuguese football manager. From 2011 to 2023 he worked with the youth teams of the Portuguese Football Federation, and was manager of the under-19 team that came runners-up at the 2023 UEFA European Under-19 Championship.

== Career ==
Born in Santa Maria da Feira, Milheiro played as a youth for Fiães before going into coaching. As a conditioning coach, he assisted Carlos Mozer at Interclube in Angola and Raja Casablanca in Morocco, as well as being assistant manager of the Portugal under-20 team that came runners-up at the 2011 FIFA U-20 World Cup in Colombia. In November 2011, Milheiro left his post at Leixões to assist Mozer at Portimonense.

In January 2012, Milheiro joined Romanian Liga I club Vaslui as assistant to former Leixões manager Augusto Inácio. After finishing the season in second place, the head coach resigned due to the club president's imposition of a native assistant manager in place of Milheiro. Returning home, he assisted the national under-17 and under-19 teams before being appointed coordinator of all youth teams in 2015. He said that the Portuguese Football Federation would prioritise intelligence over physicality.

Working up from the under-15 side, Milheiro was Portugal's manager at the 2023 UEFA European Under-19 Championship in Malta, finishing runners-up to Italy. In August that year, he ended a 12-year connection with the FPF by moving to the Qatar Football Association. He became assistant manager of the Qatar under-23 team, working with fellow FPF veteran Ilídio Vale.

Milheiro was technical director of Al Hilal in the Saudi Pro League for one year, resigning in July 2025. He was then appointed academy director at Benfica.
