= Tozé Mendes =

Portuguese football coach (born 1979)

Personal information
- Full name: António José Cardoso Mendes
- Date of birth: 12 March 1979 (age 47)
- Place of birth: Guimarães, Portugal

Team information
- Current team: Swansea City (assistant)

Managerial career
- Years: Team
- 2020–2022: Valletta
- 2022–2023: Malta U19
- 2023–2024: Vitória Guimarães B
- 2025: Marítimo (caretaker)

António José Cardoso Mendes (born 12 March 1979), commonly known as Tozé Mendes, is a Portuguese football coach who is assistant coach of Swansea City.

== Coaching career ==
=== Early career ===
Born in Guimarães, Mendes began coaching in the youth ranks of Vitória Guimarães in 2002. In 2011 he moved to Saudi Arabia's Al-Nassr to manage the under-17 team, and returned to his hometown club a year later as B-team assistant manager and under-17 manager. He won the national title in 2013–14.

In 2015–16, Mendes was under-19 manager, and came fourth at the Weifang Cup in China. In November that season he signed a contract with Chinese club Liaoning to manage at the same age range, and in January Vitória allowed him to move on a three-year deal. Mendes returned to Vitória as under-19 manager in 2018, and the under-23 team from 2019 to 2020, then went back to Saudi Arabia for the under-19 job at Al Wehda.

=== Malta ===
At the end of the year 2020, 41-year-old Mendes was given his first job as head coach of a senior team, joining Valletta who were 8th in the Maltese Premier League. His debut on 22 January was a 1–0 win over Balzan. He finished the 2020–21 season in 7th place, and left by mutual consent on 3 February 2022 while in 6th.

Mendes became manager of the Malta under-19 team on 29 April 2022. He led the team in their hosting of the 2023 UEFA European Under-19 Championship qualification, elimination with three defeats, ending with a 2–1 loss to Portugal.

=== Vitória B ===
On 1 August 2023, Mendes returned to Vitória as manager of the B team. He left the following 10 April, with one year remaining on his contract; the team were 8th in the Campeonato de Portugal and one point above being placed in the relegation series.

=== Assistant ===
Mendes moved to AVS as assistant to Vítor Campelos in July 2024. He joined Marítimo to assist Vítor Matos in August 2025. When Matos departed for Swansea City, Mendes was caretaker manager for a 2–1 home win in Liga Portugal 2 against Penafiel on 23 November.

On 19 December 2025, Mendes moved to Swansea as part of Matos's staff. His arrival at the EFL Championship club had been delayed by work permit issues.

== Managerial statistics ==
As of 9 July 2023

Managerial record by team and tenure
Team	From	To	Record				
Team	From	To	G	W	D	L	Win %
Vitória Guimarães U23	1 July 2019	30 June 2020	34	10	9	15	29.41
Valletta	28 December 2020	3 February 2022	28	12	4	12	42.86
Malta U19	29 April 2022	31 July 2023	17	1	6	10	5.88
Vitória Guimarães B	1 August 2023	10 April 2024					
Total			75	23	18	34	30.67
