= Luis Hasa =

Albanian footballer (born 2004)

Personal information
- Date of birth: 6 January 2004 (age 22)
- Place of birth: Sora, Italy
- Height: 1.72 m (5 ft 8 in)
- Position: Attacking midfielder

Team information
- Current team: Frosinone
- Number: 70

Youth career
- –2012: San Domenico Savio
- 2012–2023: Juventus

Senior career*
| Years | Team | Apps | (Gls) |
| 2023–2024 | Juventus Next Gen | 32 | (2) |
| 2024–2025 | Lecce | 0 | (0) |
| 2025–2026 | Napoli | 0 | (0) |
| 2025–2026 | → Carrarese (loan) | 31 | (5) |
| 2026– | Frosinone | 4 | (0) |

International career^{‡}
| 2021–2022 | Italy U18 | 6 | (0) |
| 2022–2023 | Italy U19 | 15 | (4) |
| 2023 | Italy U20 | 5 | (2) |
| 2024 | Italy U21 | 3 | (0) |
| 2026– | Albania | 4 | (0) |
Medal record
Men's football
Representing Italy
UEFA European Under-19 Championship
| Winner | 2023 Malta |
Mediterranean Games
| Runner-up | Oran 2022 | U-18 Team |
- * Club domestic league appearances and goals as of 7 November 2026 ‡ National team caps and goals as of 15 November 2026

Luis Hasa (Albanian pronunciation: [luˈis hasa]; born 6 January 2004) is a professional footballer who plays as an attacking midfielder for Serie A club Frosinone and the Albania national team. Born in Italy, he previously represented Italy at youth international level before switching his sporting nationality to Albania in 2026.

Born in Italy to Albanian parents, Hasa developed in the Juventus youth academy after joining the club at the age of seven and progressed through its youth ranks before establishing himself as a key player for Juventus Next Gen in Serie C, helping the team reach the national play-off quarter-finals during the 2023–24 Serie C season. He later moved to Lecce in Serie A before joining Napoli in January 2025, where he was regularly included in first-team matchday squads without making a senior appearance. He spent the 2025–26 Serie B season on loan at Carrarese, becoming one of the club's key midfielders, before joining Frosinone permanently in 2026.

At international level, Hasa represented Italy at under-18, under-19, under-20 and under-21 level after previously being involved with Albania's under-15 setup. He played a key role in Italy U19's triumph at the 2023 UEFA European Under-19 Championship, scoring once, providing the assist for the winning goal in the final, and being named the Player of the Tournament. In 2026, he switched his international allegiance to Albania and made his senior international debut later that year.

== Club career ==
=== Juventus ===
Hasa joined the Juventus youth academy after his talent was identified at the age of seven during a training session with the Pulcini team of Asti-based club San Domenico Savio. He progressed through Juventus' youth system, serving as captain of the club's Under-17 side while primarily playing as an attacking midfielder.

==== Under-19 ====
Hasa was promoted to Juventus Under-19 in January 2021, making his Campionato Primavera 1 debut and scoring once during the second half of the 2020–21 season. He established himself as a regular starter during the 2021–22 campaign, scoring three goals in the closing stages of the league season as Juventus qualified for the championship play-offs, where they reached the semi-finals. He also helped the club reach the semi-finals of the UEFA Youth League, converting his penalty in the shootout despite Juventus Next Gen were eliminated by Benfica.

During his third season with Juventus Under-19 in 2022–23, Hasa became one of the team's leading players, scoring six league goals, including three penalties, as the club again qualified for the play-offs. He opened the scoring with a free-kick in the play-off quarter-final against Sassuolo, although Juventus were eliminated following a 1–1 draw, with competition regulations awarding progression to the higher-seeded team from the regular season. In the UEFA Youth League, he recorded four goals and one assist as Juventus finished second in Group H to reach the knockout play-offs, where they were eliminated by Genk. He finished his Juventus Under-19 career with 76 appearances and 15 goals across all competitions.

==== Next Gen and First-team ====
Hasa received his first call-up to Juventus Next Gen on 17 December 2022 for a 2022–23 Serie C match against Virtus Verona, remaining an unused substitute. He made his unofficial senior debut on 12 August 2023 after being included in the Juventus first-team squad by head coach Massimiliano Allegri for a pre-season friendly against Atalanta, coming on as a second-half substitute in a goalless draw.

Promoted to Juventus Next Gen ahead of the 2023–24 season, Hasa established himself as a regular starter in Serie C. He scored his first professional goal on 19 December 2023, curling a 25-metre free-kick after winning the foul himself to secure a 1–0 away victory over Virtus Entella. Tuttosport awarded him a 7.5 rating—the highest among the midfielders—and highlighted his defensive contribution after he moved into a deeper midfield role during the second half. Juventus later identified the goal as a turning point in the team's season, with Next Gen climbing from the relegation zone to seventh place and qualifying for the promotion play-offs.

Tuttosport later described Hasa as the team's midfield orchestrator, praising his development throughout the campaign. His performances earned him his first official senior call-up on 11 January 2024 for the Coppa Italia quarter-final against Frosinone, where he was assigned squad number 50. He was again named in the first-team squad five days later for a Serie A match against Sassuolo, remaining an unused substitute on both occasions. These proved to be his only first-team involvements. During the promotion play-offs, he played every available minute as Juventus Next Gen reached the national quarter-finals before being eliminated by Carrarese after consecutive draws, with progression decided by competition regulations.

By the end of the campaign, Hasa had become one of Juventus Next Gen's most-used players under head coach Massimo Brambilla in his first full professional season, later stating that adapting to a two-man central midfield had been important for his development. He left Juventus in August 2024 after making 40 appearances while recording two goals and seven assists for Next Gen across all competitions, before joining Serie A club Lecce on a permanent transfer.

=== Lecce and Napoli ===
Hasa joined Lecce in Serie A on 30 August 2024. He made his only appearance for the club on 24 September, coming on as a late substitute in a 2–0 Coppa Italia defeat to Sassuolo, before leaving in January 2025.

On 8 January 2025, Hasa signed for Napoli. Although he was named in every matchday squad for the remainder of the 2024–25 Serie A season, he did not make his competitive debut as Napoli won the league title.

==== Loan to Carrarese ====
On 1 September 2025, Hasa joined Serie B club Carrarese on loan for the remainder of the season. He quickly established himself as a regular starter, operating in several midfield roles throughout the campaign, initially as a defensive midfielder before becoming primarily used in central midfield while also making occasional appearances as an attacking midfielder.

Hasa made an immediate impact on his debut on 13 September 2025, providing the assist for Carrarese's equaliser in a 1–1 draw against Catanzaro during the third matchday of the 2025–26 Serie B season. He scored his first goal for the club on 5 October, adding an assist in a 3–0 home victory over Juve Stabia, handing the visitors their first defeat of the season. He found the net again the following matchday, scoring Carrarese's second goal in a 2–2 away draw against Pescara.

On 1 March 2026, Hasa headed in Carrarese's equaliser in a 1–1 away draw against Mantova, helping his side recover after conceding in the opening minute. Later that month, he scored his fifth goal of the season in a victory that ended Carrarese's nearly two-month winless run, before providing an assist in the following match as the club recorded consecutive wins without conceding. He registered his fourth assist of the campaign in Carrarese's third consecutive victory, setting up the team's third goal against Spezia.

Despite Hasa's contributions, Carrarese finished in the lower half of the table, ending the season five points short of the final promotion play-off place.

=== Frosinone ===
On 25 July 2026, Hasa joined newly promoted Serie A club Frosinone.

== International career ==
Born in Sora, Lazio, Italy, to Albanian parents from Peqin, Hasa was eligible to represent both the Italy and Albania national teams through his Albanian citizenship inherited from his parents.

Hasa was initially involved with the Albania under-15 team before later representing Italy at youth level with the under-18, -19, -20 and -21 teams. At the 2023 UEFA European Under-19 Championship, he played a key role in Italy's successful campaign and was named Player of the Tournament; he scored the equalising goal in the final group-stage match against Poland, which secured qualification for the knockout stage, and provided the assist for the winning goal in the final against Portugal, as Italy won their second European Under-19 title.

=== Albania ===
In May 2022, Hasa declined a call-up from the Albania under-21 team for the UEFA European Under-21 Championship qualifiers, opting to continue representing Italy at the time.

On 26 March 2026, FIFA approved Hasa's request to change his international sporting nationality from Italy to Albania through its Change of Association Platform. He made his debut for Albania on 3 June 2026, coming on as a substitute in a 1–0 home defeat against Israel.

== Career statistics ==
=== Club ===
As of match played 7 November 2026

Appearances and goals by club, season and competition
| Club | Season | League | | | National cup (Note: Includes Coppa Italia Serie C, Coppa Italia) | | Europe | | Other | | Total | |
| Club | Season | Division | Apps | Goals | Apps | Goals | Apps | Goals | Apps | Goals | Apps | Goals |
|---|---|---|---|---|---|---|---|---|---|---|---|---|
| Juventus Next Gen | 2023–24 | Serie C | 32 | 2 | 2 | 0 | — | | 6 (Note: Appearances in Serie C promotion play-offs) | 0 | 40 | 2 |
| Juventus | 2023–24 | Serie A | 0 | 0 | 0 | 0 | — | | — | | 0 | 0 |
| Lecce | 2024–25 | Serie A | 0 | 0 | 1 | 0 | — | | — | | 1 | 0 |
| Napoli | 2024–25 | Serie A | 0 | 0 | — | | — | | — | | 0 | 0 |
| Carrarese | 2025–26 | Serie B | 31 | 5 | 0 | 0 | — | | — | | 31 | 5 |
| Frosinone | 2026–27 | Serie A | 4 | 0 | 1 | 0 | — | | — | | 5 | 0 |
| Career total | | | 67 | 7 | 4 | 0 | 0 | 0 | 6 | 0 | 77 | 7 |

=== International ===
As of match played 15 November 2026

Appearances and goals by national team and year
| National team | Year | Apps | Goals |
|---|---|---|---|
Albania
| Albania | 2026 | 4 | 0 |
| Total | | 4 | 0 |

== Honours ==
Italy U19

- UEFA European Under-19 Championship: 2023

Individual

- UEFA European Under-19 Championship Team of the Tournament: 2023
- UEFA European Under-19 Championship Player of the Tournament: 2023
