= Róbert Frosti Þorkelsson =

Icelandic footballer (born 2005)

Personal information
- Full name: Róbert Frosti Þorkelsson
- Date of birth: 18 August 2005 (age 21)
- Place of birth: Iceland
- Height: 1.82 m (6 ft 0 in)
- Position: Midfielder

Team information
- Current team: GAIS
- Number: 17

Youth career
- –2021: Stjarnan

Senior career*
Years	Team	Apps	(Gls)
2022–2024	Stjarnan	55	(3)
2025–	GAIS	14	(2)

International career^{‡}
2021	Iceland U17	4	(0)
2022–2023	Iceland U19	10	(0)
2024	Iceland U20	2	(0)
2024-	Iceland U21	11	(0)
- * Club domestic league appearances and goals as of 8 July 2026 ‡ National team caps and goals as of 18:00, 19 April 2026 (UTC)

Róbert Frosti Þorkelsson (born 18 August 2005) is an Icelandic footballer who plays for GAIS and the Iceland national under-21 football team.

== Club career ==
Þorkelsson made his debut for Stjarnan on 25 February 2022 against Fjölnir in the Lengjubikar. On 24 January 2025 GAIS announced the signing of Þorkelsson on a five-year contract. On 15 February 2025 Þorkelsson made his debut for GAIS in a 4–1 win over Örebro SK in Svenska Cupen. On 19 April 2026 he scored his first goal for GAIS in a 2–1 defeat against BK Häcken.
