= Vedran Celjak =

Croatian footballer

Personal information
- Date of birth: 13 August 1991 (age 35)
- Place of birth: Zabok, Croatia
- Height: 1.87 m (6 ft 2 in)
- Position: Right-back

Team information
- Current team: Rudeš
- Number: 4

Senior career*
Years	Team	Apps	(Gls)
2008–2011	NK Zagreb	42	(0)
2011–2015	Sampdoria	0	(0)
2011–2012	→ Pergocrema (loan)	24	(1)
2012–2013	→ Grosseto (loan)	3	(0)
2013–2014	→ Padova (loan)	5	(0)
2014–2015	→ Benevento (loan)	39	(0)
2015–2018	Alessandria	99	(2)
2019	Sambenedettese	26	(0)
2019–2020	Avellino	27	(0)
2020–2025	Lecco	140	(6)
2025–	Rudeš	28	(3)

International career^{‡}
2008–2009	Croatia U19	10	(0)
2010	Croatia U20	1	(0)
2010–2011	Croatia U21	5	(0)
- * Club domestic league appearances and goals as of 16 June 2026 ‡ National team caps and goals as of 12 June 2012

Vedran Celjak (born 13 August 1991) is a Croatian professional footballer who plays as a right-back for Rudeš.

== Club career ==
On 20 November 2018, Celjak signed with Sambenedettese.

On 12 August 2019, he moved to Avellino.

On 24 August 2020 he joined Lecco.
