= Hugo Félix =

Portuguese footballer

Personal information
- Full name: Hugo Félix Sequeira
- Date of birth: 3 March 2004 (age 22)
- Place of birth: Viseu, Portugal
- Height: 1.70 m (5 ft 7 in)
- Positions: Attacking midfielder; winger

Team information
- Current team: Tondela
- Number: 79

Youth career
- 2011–2015: Porto
- 2015–2016: CB Viseu
- 2016–2023: Benfica

Senior career*
| Years | Team | Apps | (Gls) |
| 2022–2025 | Benfica B | 61 | (4) |
| 2025– | Tondela | 26 | (0) |

International career^{‡}
| 2019 | Portugal U15 | 5 | (1) |
| 2019–2020 | Portugal U16 | 5 | (1) |
| 2021–2022 | Portugal U18 | 15 | (3) |
| 2022–2023 | Portugal U19 | 14 | (7) |
| 2023–2024 | Portugal U20 | 5 | (0) |
| 2023– | Portugal U21 | 1 | (0) |
Medal record
Men's football
Representing Portugal
UEFA European Under-19 Championship
| Runner-up | 2023 Malta |
CONCACAF Under-15 Championship
| Winner | 2019 United States |
- * Club domestic league appearances and goals as of 18 May 2026 ‡ National team caps and goals as of 19:42, 11 November 2025 (UTC)

Hugo Félix Sequeira (born 3 March 2004) is a Portuguese professional footballer who plays as an attacking midfielder for Primeira Liga club Tondela. He is the younger brother of João Félix.

== Early life ==
Born in Viseu, Félix spent his early career with Porto, before joining Benfica satellite club Casa do Benfica Viseu in 2015.

== Club career ==
Having linked up with Benfica's youth sides permanently in 2016, Félix signed his first professional contract in July 2020.

Following his time in the Benfica youth ranks, Félix was part of the Lisbon-based club's roster. He was included in The Guardian's "Next Generation" list for 2021, which lists young football players.

== International career ==
Félix has represented Portugal at youth international level.

== Personal life ==
He is the brother of professional footballer João Félix. He is of Brazilian descent through his father who was born in Brazil.

== Career statistics ==
=== Club ===
As of match played 4 May 2025

Appearances and goals by club, season and competition
| Club | Season | League | | | National cup | | League cup | | Other | | Total | |
| Club | Season | Division | Apps | Goals | Apps | Goals | Apps | Goals | Apps | Goals | Apps | Goals |
|---|---|---|---|---|---|---|---|---|---|---|---|---|
| Benfica B | 2021–22 | Liga Portugal 2 | 1 | 0 | — | | — | | — | | 1 | 0 |
| Benfica B | 2022–23 | Liga Portugal 2 | 1 | 0 | — | | — | | — | | 1 | 0 |
| Benfica B | 2023–24 | Liga Portugal 2 | 27 | 2 | — | | — | | — | | 27 | 2 |
| Benfica B | 2024–25 | Liga Portugal 2 | 30 | 2 | — | | — | | — | | 30 | 2 |
| Benfica B | Total | | 59 | 4 | — | | — | | — | | 59 | 4 |
| Benfica | 2024–25 | Primeira Liga | 0 | 0 | 1 | 0 | 0 | 0 | 0 | 0 | 1 | 0 |
| Career total | | | 59 | 4 | 1 | 0 | 0 | 0 | 0 | 0 | 60 | 4 |

== Honours ==
Benfica

- UEFA Youth League: 2021–22

Portugal

- CONCACAF Under-15 Championship: 2019
- Nations Cup: 2019

Individual

- UEFA European Under-19 Championship Team of the Tournament: 2023
