= João Vasconcelos =

Portuguese footballer (born 2005)

Personal information
- Full name: João de Vasconcelos Faria Gonçalves
- Date of birth: 26 February 2005 (age 21)
- Place of birth: Braga, Portugal
- Height: 1.80 m (5 ft 11 in)
- Position: Attacking midfielder

Team information
- Current team: Santa Clara
- Number: 17

Youth career
- 2013–2014: Braga
- 2014–2016: CB Póvoa Lanhoso
- 2016–2017: CB Fafe
- 2017–2023: Braga

Senior career*
| Years | Team | Apps | (Gls) |
| 2023–2026 | Braga B | 67 | (9) |
| 2024–2026 | Braga | 2 | (0) |
| 2026– | Santa Clara | 2 | (0) |

International career^{‡}
| 2019 | Portugal U16 | 3 | (1) |
| 2021 | Portugal U16 | 4 | (2) |
| 2021–2022 | Portugal U17 | 16 | (4) |
| 2022–2023 | Portugal U18 | 9 | (2) |
| 2023–2024 | Portugal U19 | 14 | (3) |
| 2024–2025 | Portugal U20 | 8 | (0) |
Medal record
Men's football
Representing Portugal
UEFA European Under-19 Championship
| Runner-up | 2023 Malta |
- * Club domestic league appearances and goals as of 20 September 2026 ‡ National team caps and goals as of 22:11, 24 March 2025 (UTC)

João de Vasconcelos Faria Gonçalves (born 26 February 2005) is a Portuguese professional footballer who plays as an attacking midfielder for Primeira Liga club Santa Clara.

== Career ==
Vasconcelos is a youth product of CB Póvoa Lanhoso, CB Fafe and Braga. On 15 April 2021, he signed his first professional contract with Braga. In 2023, he was promoted to Braga B and started playing in the Liga 3. On 15 January 2024, he extended his contract with Braga until 2028. He made his senior and professional debut with Braga as a substitute in a 5–0 UEFA Europa League win over Maccabi Petah Tikva on 1 August 2024.

On 24 July 2026, Vasconcelos signed a three-season contract with Santa Clara.

== International career ==
Vasconcelos is a youth international for Portugal, having played for the Portugal U19s that came second at the 2023 UEFA European Under-19 Championship. In October 2024, he was called up to the Portugal U20s for a set of friendlies.

== Career statistics ==
=== Club ===
As of match played 20 September 2026

Appearances and goals by club, season and competition
| Club | Season | League | | | Cup | | League cup | | Europe | | Total | |
| Club | Season | Division | Apps | Goals | Apps | Goals | Apps | Goals | Apps | Goals | Apps | Goals |
|---|---|---|---|---|---|---|---|---|---|---|---|---|
| Braga B | 2023–24 | Liga 3 | 24 | 3 | — | | — | | — | | 24 | 3 |
| Braga B | 2024–25 | Liga 3 | 17 | 1 | — | | — | | — | | 17 | 1 |
| Braga B | 2025–26 | Liga 3 | 26 | 5 | — | | — | | — | | 26 | 5 |
| Braga B | Total | | 67 | 9 | — | | — | | — | | 67 | 9 |
| Braga | 2025–26 | Primeira Liga | 1 | 0 | — | | — | | — | | 1 | 0 |
| Santa Clara | 2026–27 | Primeira Liga | 2 | 0 | 0 | 0 | 0 | 0 | — | | 2 | 0 |
| Career total | | | 70 | 9 | 0 | 0 | 0 | 0 | 0 | 0 | 70 | 9 |
