= Vangelis Nikolaou =

Greek footballer

Personal information
- Full name: Evangelos Nikolaou
- Date of birth: 3 June 2004 (age 22)
- Place of birth: Greece
- Height: 1.85 m (6 ft 1 in)
- Position: Attacking midfielder

Team information
- Current team: Panetolikos
- Number: 77

Youth career
- 2018–2022: Panetolikos

Senior career*
Years	Team	Apps	(Gls)
2022–	Panetolikos	44	(0)

International career^{‡}
2022–2023	Greece U19	9	(1)
2024–	Greece U21	8	(0)
- * Club domestic league appearances and goals as of 21 May 2026 ‡ National team caps and goals as of 30 May 2026

Vangelis Nikolaou (Greek: Βαγγέλης Νικολάου, born 3 June 2004) is a Greek professional footballer who plays as an attacking midfielder for Super League club Panetolikos.

== Career statistics ==
=== Club ===
As of match played 19 August 2026

Club	Season	League			National cup (Note: Includes Greek Cup)		Continental		Other		Total	
Club	Season	Division	Apps	Goals	Apps	Goals	Apps	Goals	Apps	Goals	Apps	Goals
Panetolikos	2022–23	Super League Greece	1	0	0	0	—	—	—	—	1	0
Panetolikos	2023–24	Super League Greece	2	0	1	0	—	—	—	—	3	0
Panetolikos	2024–25	Super League Greece	23	0	1	0	—	—	—	—	24	0
Panetolikos	2025–26	Super League Greece	18	0	6	0	—	—	—	—	24	0
Panetolikos	2026–27	Super League Greece	0	0	1	0	—	—	—	—	1	0
Total			44	0	9	0	—	—	—	—	53	0
Career total			44	0	9	0	0	0	0	0	53	0
