= Ágúst Orri Þorsteinsson =

Icelandic footballer (born 2005)

Personal information
- Date of birth: 14 January 2005 (age 21)
- Place of birth: Iceland
- Positions: Midfielder; winger

Team information
- Current team: Excelsior
- Number: 30

Youth career
- –2022: Breiðablik
- 2022–2023: MFF
- 2023: Breiðablik
- 2023–2024: Genoa

Senior career*
| Years | Team | Apps | (Gls) |
| 2025–2026 | Breiðablik | 43 | (7) |
| 2026– | Excelsior | 5 | (0) |

International career^{‡}
| 2019 | Iceland U15 | 3 | (0) |
| 2021 | Iceland U17 | 5 | (0) |
| 2022–2023 | Iceland U19 | 13 | (2) |
| 2024 | Iceland U20 | 2 | (0) |
| 2024–2026 | Iceland U21 | 10 | (1) |
| 2026– | Iceland | 1 | (0) |
- * Club domestic league appearances and goals as of 19 September 2026 ‡ National team caps and goals as of 30 March 2026

Ágúst Orri Þorsteinsson (born 14 January 2005) is an Icelandic professional footballer who plays as a midfielder or winger for Excelsior.

== Club career ==
As a youth player, Þorsteinsson joined the youth academy of Breiðablik. Following his stint there, he joined the youth academy of Swedish side MFF in 2022, where the club planned to gradually promote him to the senior team.

Subsequently, he joined the youth academy of Italian Serie A outfit Genoa. Ahead of the 2025 season, he returned to Breiðablik, where he made forty-three league appearances and scored seven goals and played in the UEFA Conference League. Six months later, he signed for Excelsior in the Netherlands.

== International career ==
Þorsteinsson is an Iceland international and has represented the country internationally at under-15, under-17, under-19, under-20, and under-21 level. Altogether, he made three appearances and scored zero goals while playing for the Iceland men's national under-15 football team and five appearances and scored zero goals while playing for the Iceland men's national under-17 football team.

During the spring of 2023, he played for the Iceland men's national under-19 football team for 2023 UEFA European Under-19 Championship qualification, helping the team qualify for the competition. The same year, he played for the Iceland men's national under-19 football team at the 2023 UEFA European Under-19 Championship. On 25 February 2026, he debuted for the Iceland men's national football team during a 0–5 away friendly loss to the Mexico national football team.

== Personal life ==
Þorsteinsson was born on 14 January 2005. Born in Iceland, he has been in a relationship with Birna Mjöll.
