= 2026–27 Croatian Football Cup =

SuperSport Hrvatski nogometni kup

Tournament details
- Country: Croatia
- Teams: 48

Tournament statistics
- Matches played: 38
- Goals scored: 163 (4.29 per match)

1The 2026–27 Croatian Football Cup is the 36th season of Croatia's football knockout competition. It was sponsored by the betting company SuperSport and known as the SuperSport Hrvatski nogometni kup for sponsorship purposes. The defending champions is Dinamo Zagreb, having won their 18th title the previous year by defeating Rijeka in the final.

== Calendar ==
Round	Date(s)	Matches	Clubs	New entries	Financial sponsorship	Goals / games
Preliminary round	26 August 2026	16	48 → 32	32	€1,500 (both teams)	80 / 16
Round of 32	9 September 2026	16	32 → 16	16	€2,000 (both teams)	55 / 15
Round of 16	28 October 2026	8	16 → 8	none	€2,500 (home team)	24 / 7
Quarter-finals	3 March 2027	4	8 → 4	none	€3,000 (both teams)	
Semi-finals	21 April 2027	2	4 → 2	none	€6,000 (both teams)	
Final	29 May 2027	1	2 → 1	none	€20,000 (winner) / €10,000 (runner up)	

== Participating clubs ==
The following 48 teams qualified for the competition:

Best clubs by cup coefficient 16 clubs	Winners and runners up of county cups 32 clubs
Rijeka; Dinamo Zagreb; Hajduk Split; Slaven Belupo; Osijek; Gorica; Lokomotiva; Šibenik (withdrawn); Istra 1961; Varaždin; Rudeš; BSK Bijelo Brdo; Mladost Ždralovi; Oriolik; Cibalia; Bjelovar	Osijek-Baranja County cup winner: Vardarac; Osijek-Baranja County cup runner up: Radnički Dalj; Zagreb County cup winner: Tigar Sveta Nedelja; Zagreb County cup runner up: Vrbovec; Brod-Posavina County cup winner: Svačić; Brod-Posavina County cup runner up: Tomislav (DA); Međimurje County cup winner: Graničar Kotoriba; Međimurje County cup runner up: Bratstvo Jurovec; Vukovar-Srijem County cup winner: Vukovar 1991; Vukovar-Srijem County cup runner up: Bedem Ivankovo; Koprivnica-Križevci County cup winner: Radnik Križevci; Koprivnica-Križevci County cup runner up: Koprivnica; Istria County cup winner: Uljanik Pula; Istria County cup runner up: Ližnjan; Sisak-Moslavina County cup winner: Segesta; Sisak-Moslavina County cup runner up: Moslavina; Bjelovar-Bilogora County cup winner: Daruvar; Bjelovar-Bilogora County cup runner up: Dinamo Predavac; Varaždin County cup winner: Varteks; Varaždin County cup runner up: Podravina; City of Zagreb cup winner: Kustošija; City of Zagreb cup runner up: Hrvatski Dragovoljac; Virovitica-Podravina County cup winner: Slatina; Split-Dalmatia County cup winner: Uskok; Primorje-Gorski Kotar County cup winner: Orijent; Požega-Slavonia County cup winner: Slavonija Požega; Zadar County cup winner: Zadar; Karlovac County cup winner: Karlovac 1919; Dubrovnik-Neretva County cup winner: Neretva; Krapina-Zagorje County cup winner: Zagorec; Šibenik-Knin County cup winner: Zagora Unešić; Lika-Senj County cup winner: Otočac

== Preliminary round ==
The draw for the preliminary single-legged round was held on 20 July 2026 and the matches were played on 26 August 2026.

Tie no.	Home team	Score	Away team
1	Varteks	2–2 (1–3 p)	Bedem Ivankovo
2	Orijent	3–1	Radnik Križevci
3	Vrbovec	4–1	Daruvar
4*	Neretva	5–2 (a.e.t.)	Otočac
5	Dinamo Predavac	0–2 (a.e.t.)	Hrvatski Dragovoljac
6	Uskok	3–0	Podravina
7	Tigar Sveta Nedelja	1–4	Karlovac 1919
8**	Vukovar 1991	4–1	Radnički Dalj
9	Zagora Unešić	4–2	Bratstvo Jurovec
10	Svačić	2–3	Koprivnica
11	Tomislav (DA)	4–0	Uljanik Pula
12	Slavonija Požega	3–0	Moslavina
13**	Kustošija	3–1	Zadar
14	Graničar Kotoriba	1–2 (a.e.t.)	Zagorec
15	Vardarac	3–1	Ližnjan
16**	Slatina	0–18	Segesta

*Matches played on 22 August 2026.
**Matches played on 25 August 2026.

== Round of 32 ==
The pairing is determined according to the principle of opposite numbers, which were assigned based on the club coefficient. If two or more teams had same coefficient then better number would be allocated to better placed team in the last season. Neretva and Zagorec had same coefficient and ranking so their opponents will be decided by draw, same is for tie including Koprivnica and Zagora Unešić. Matches were played on 9 September 2026.

Tie no.	Home team	Score	Away team
1***	Vrbovec	0–6	Rijeka
2	Bedem Ivankovo	0–4	Dinamo Zagreb
3*	Vardarac	0–2	Hajduk Split
4	Hrvatski Dragovoljac	0–5	Slaven Belupo
5	Uskok	1–3 (a.e.t.)	Gorica
6	Segesta	3–1	Osijek
7	Tomislav (DA)	0–2	Lokomotiva
8	Neretva	3–0 (w.o.)	Šibenik
9*	Zagorec	0–5	Istra 1961
10	Zagora Unešić	0–4	Varaždin
11	Koprivnica	2–3	Rudeš
12***	Kustošija	1–2	BSK Bijelo Brdo
13	Orijent	2–2 (6–7 p)	Mladost Ždralovi
14	Slavonija Požega	4–0	Oriolik
15	Vukovar 1991	1–0	Cibalia
16**	Bjelovar	0–2	Karlovac 1919

*Matches played on 8 September 2026.
**Match played on 15 September 2026.
***Matches played on 16 September 2026.

== Round of 16 ==
The pairing in Round of 16 is determined according to the principle of opposite numbers, with teams receiving the number of tie they won.

Tie no.	Date	Home team	Score	Away team
1	20 October 2026	Karlovac 1919	1–4	Rijeka
2	4 October 2026	Vukovar 1991	0–4	Dinamo Zagreb
3	2 December 2026	Slavonija Požega		Hajduk Split
4	3 November 2026	Mladost Ždralovi	2–0	Slaven Belupo
5	14 November 2026	BSK Bijelo Brdo	2–1 (a.e.t.)	Gorica
6	14 November 2026	Rudeš	2–3 (a.e.t.)	Segesta
7	28 October 2026	Varaždin	1–1 (5–4 p)	Lokomotiva
8	3 November 2026	Istra 1961	3–0	Neretva

== Quarter-finals ==
Quarter-final match-ups will be determined by a draw. The single-legged round is scheduled to be played on 3 March 2027.

Qualified teams:

- Dinamo Zagreb
- Rijeka
- Varaždin
- Mladost Ždralovi
- Istra 1961
- BSK Bijelo Brdo
- Segesta
