= Miguel Falé =

Portuguese footballer

Personal information
- Full name: Miguel Maria Mariano Falé
- Date of birth: 28 January 2004 (age 22)
- Place of birth: Redondo, Portugal
- Height: 1.80 m (5 ft 11 in)
- Positions: Forward; winger

Team information
- Current team: Paços de Ferreira
- Number: 96

Youth career
- 2010–2017: Benfica
- 2017–2018: Lusitano G.C.
- 2018–2021: Braga

Senior career*
Years	Team	Apps	(Gls)
2021–2024	Braga	8	(0)
2022–2024	Braga B	12	(0)
2023–2024	→ Castellón (loan)	2	(0)
2023–2024	→ Castellón B (loan)	3	(0)
2024–2025	Mafra	42	(6)
2025–2026	Panserraikos	7	(0)
2026–	Paços de Ferreira	14	(1)

International career^{‡}
2020	Portugal U16	3	(3)
2021–2022	Portugal U18	12	(3)
2022–2023	Portugal U19	11	(3)
2023–2024	Portugal U20	6	(1)
Medal record
Men's football
Representing Portugal
UEFA European Under-19 Championship
Runner-up	2023 Malta
- * Club domestic league appearances and goals as of 20 June 2026 ‡ National team caps and goals as of 18:07, 21 November 2023 (UTC)

Miguel Maria Mariano Falé (born 28 January 2004) is a Portuguese professional footballer who plays as a forward or winger for Liga 3 club Paços de Ferreira.

== Club career ==
Falé is a youth product of Benfica and Lusitano de Évora, before joining Braga's youth academy in 2018. He started training with their first team in 2021. He made his professional debut for Braga as a late substitute in a 6–0 Primeira Liga win over Arouca, on 30 December 2021.

On 18 August 2023, Braga sent Falé on a season-long loan to Spanish third division side Castellón. On 5 January 2024, after he made just three appearances for Castellón's main team, Falé's loan was cancelled and he returned to Braga.

On 18 January 2024, Falé signed a four-and-a-half-year contract with Liga Portugal 2 club Mafra. Braga kept 50% of his economic rights.

In July 2025, following Mafra's relegation to Liga 3, Falé moved to Greece, joining Greek Super League club Panserraikos.

On 3 January 2026, after failing to score in eight appearances for Panserraikos, Falé returned to Portugal, joining Liga Portugal 2 club Paços de Ferreira on a contract until June 2028.

== International career ==
Falé is a youth international for Portugal, having represented the Portugal U16s, U18s and U19s. He was part of the squad that reached the 2023 UEFA European Under-19 Championship final.
