= Samuele Vignato =

Italian footballer (born 2004)

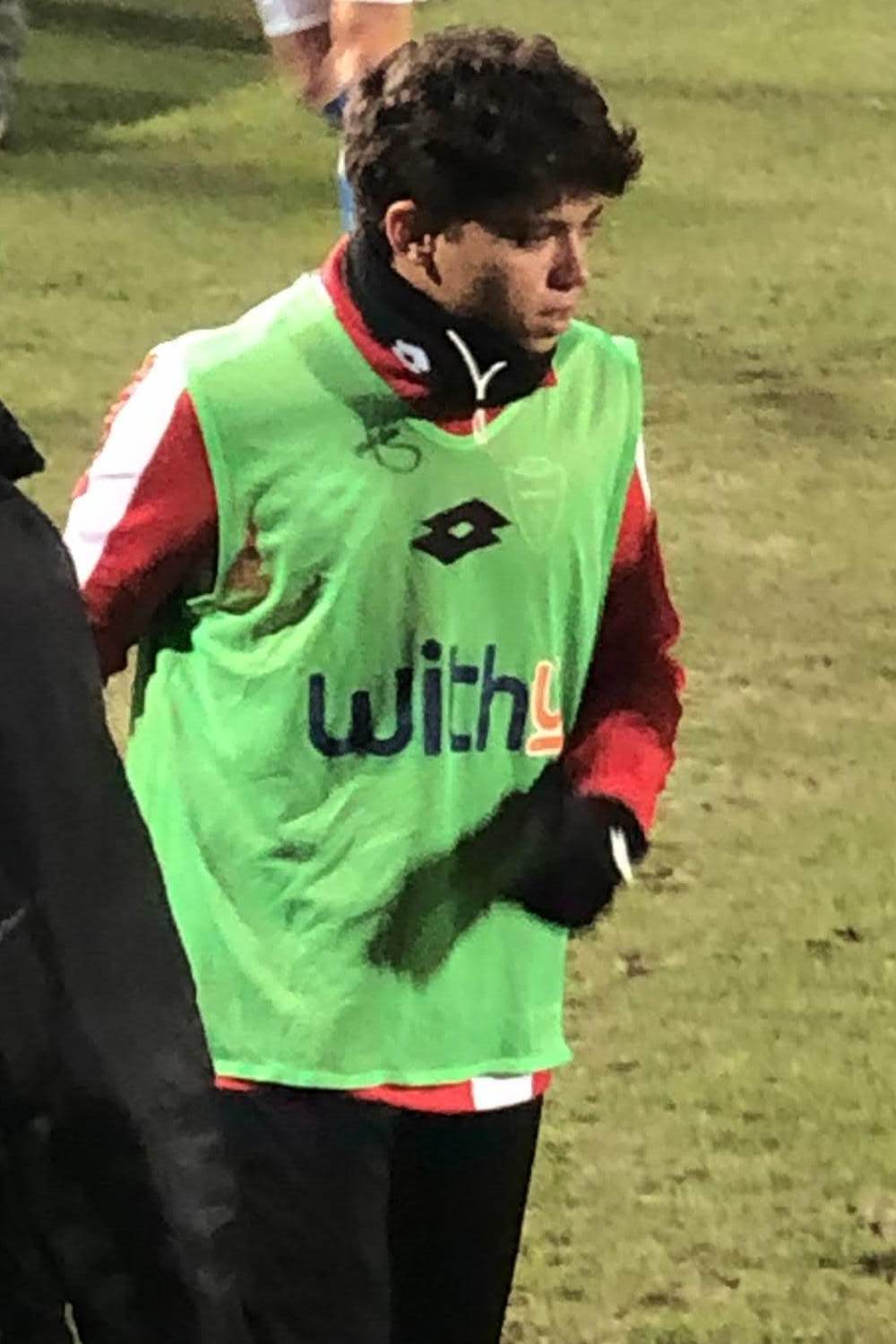
- Vignato with Monza in 2021

Personal information
- Date of birth: 24 February 2004 (age 22)
- Place of birth: Negrar, Italy
- Height: 1.72 m (5 ft 8 in)
- Position: Attacking midfielder

Team information
- Current team: Rijeka
- Number: 19

Youth career
- –2010: Pieve
- 2010–2021: ChievoVerona

Senior career*
Years	Team	Apps	(Gls)
2021	ChievoVerona	2	(0)
2021–2025	Monza	45	(2)
2025–	Rijeka	18	(2)

International career^{‡}
2019	Italy U15	4	(3)
2019–2020	Italy U16	12	(3)
2021–2022	Italy U18	5	(1)
2021–2023	Italy U19	16	(7)
Medal record
Men's football
Representing Italy
UEFA European Under-19 Championship
Winner	2023 Malta
- * Club domestic league appearances and goals as of 15:12, 6 September 2026 (UTC) ‡ National team caps and goals as of 16 July 2023

Samuele Vignato (born 24 February 2004) is an Italian professional footballer who plays as an attacking midfielder for Rijeka.

== Early life ==
Vignato was born on 24 February 2004 in Negrar in the Province of Verona, Italy, to Italian father Davide and a Brazilian mother Shèrida. Having begun playing youth football at local club Pieve, Vignato joined ChievoVerona's youth sector aged six.

== Club career ==
=== ChievoVerona ===
After having played for ChievoVerona's under-17s, Vignato was promoted to their Primavera (under-19) side, scoring 14 goals and making 11 assists in 18 games in the 2020–21 Campionato Primavera 2 season. He made his first-team debut for Chievo on 4 May 2021, as a 76th-minute substitute in a Serie B game against Cremonese. Vignato finished the season with two league games, having also played against Virtus Entella as a substitute.

=== Monza ===
On 11 August 2021, Vignato joined Serie B side Monza on a three-year deal. He made his debut on 29 August, playing the first half of a 1–0 league win against Cremonese. On 25 September, Vignato scored his first professional goal, in a 3–1 Serie B win against Pordenone. He became the first player born in 2004 to score in an Italian professional league.

On 25 February 2022, Vignato's contract was extended until 30 June 2025. After having helped Monza gain promotion to the Serie A for the first time in their history, Vignato made his Italian top-flight debut in the 2022–23 Serie A on 7 November 2022, as a stoppage-time substitute in a 2–0 home win against Hellas Verona.

On Vignato's first game as a starter, on 8 October 2023, he scored his first Serie A goal in a 3–0 home win against Salernitana. He became the first player born in 2004 to score in the Italian top flight, and the youngest Monza player to do so.

== International career ==
Eligible to also represent Brazil internationally, Vignato played for Italy at under-15, under-16 and under-18 levels. Having played 16 games for the under-16s, Vignato made his under-18 debut in a friendly against Austria in June 2021.

Vignato was first called up to the under-19 team on 4 August 2022, for a friendly game against Albania on 10 August. In June 2023, he was included in the Italian squad for the UEFA European Under-19 Championship in Malta, where the Azzurrini eventually won their second continental title.

== Style of play ==
Mainly an attacking midfielder, Vignato can also play as a mezzala. His main characteristics are his dribbling and technical abilities.

== Personal life ==
Vignato's brother, Emanuel, is also a professional football player.

== Career statistics ==
=== Club ===
As of match played 4 May 2025

Appearances and goals by club, season and competition
Club	Season	League			Coppa Italia		Other		Total	
Club	Season	Division	Apps	Goals	Apps	Goals	Apps	Goals	Apps	Goals
Chievo	2020–21	Serie B	2	0	0	0	0	0	2	0
Monza	2021–22	Serie B	13	1	0	0	0	0	13	1
Monza	2022–23	Serie A	5	0	2	0	—		7	0
Monza	2023–24	Serie A	10	1	1	0	—		11	1
Monza	2024–25	Serie A	17	0	1	0	—		18	0
Monza	Total		45	2	4	0	0	0	49	2
Career total			47	2	4	0	0	0	51	2

== Honours ==
Italy U19

- UEFA European Under-19 Championship: 2023
