= 2023 UEFA European Under-19 Championship =

Kampjonat Ewropew 2023 ta' Taħt id-19-il sena

Tournament details
- Host country: Malta
- Dates: 3–16 July
- Teams: 8 (from 1 confederation)
- Venues: 4 (in 3 host cities)

Final positions
- Champions: Italy (4th title)
- Runners-up: Portugal

Tournament statistics
- Matches played: 15
- Goals scored: 49 (3.27 per match)
- Attendance: 20,539 (1,369 per match)
- Top scorer(s): (Spain) Víctor Barberà (4 goals)
- Best player: (Italy) Luis Hasa

The 2023 UEFA European Under-19 Championship (also known as UEFA Under-19 Euro 2023) was the 20th edition of the UEFA European Under-19 Championship (70th edition if the Under-18 and Junior eras are included), the annual international youth football championship organised by UEFA for the men's under-19 national teams of Europe. Malta hosted the tournament from 3 to 16 July 2023. A total of eight teams played in the tournament, with players born on or after 1 January 2004 eligible to participate.

England were the defending champions. They were not able to defend the title after failing to qualify for the competition. Italy were crowned champions for the fourth time after beating Portugal 1–0 in the final.

== Host selection ==
Malta was appointed as the host for the tournament by the UEFA Executive Committee during their meeting on 19 April 2021 in Montreux, Switzerland.

== Qualification ==
=== Qualified teams ===
The following teams qualified for the final tournament.

Note: All appearance statistics include only U-19 era (since 2002).

| Team | Method of qualification | Appearance | Last appearance | Previous best performance |
|---|---|---|---|---|
| Malta | Hosts | 1st | Debut | |
| Norway | Elite round Group 1 winners | 6th | 2019 (Group stage) | Group stage (2002, 2003, 2005, 2018, 2019) |
| Italy | Elite round Group 2 winners | 9th | 2022 (Semi-finals) | Champions (2003) |
| Spain | Elite round Group 3 winners | 13th | 2019 (Champions) | Champions (2002, 2004, 2006, 2007, 2011, 2012, 2015, 2019) |
| Portugal | Elite round Group 4 winners | 12th | 2019 (Runners-up) | Champions (2018) |
| Greece | Elite round Group 5 winners | 7th | 2015 (Semi-finals) | Runners-up (2007, 2012) |
| Poland | Elite round Group 6 winners | 3rd | 2006 (Group stage) | Group stage (2004, 2006) |
| Iceland | Elite round Group 7 winners | 1st | Debut | |

== Venues ==
| Ta'Qali | | Paola |
|---|---|---|
| National Stadium | Centenary Stadium | Tony Bezzina Stadium |
| Capacity: 16,997 | Capacity: 3,000 | Capacity: 2,968 |
| Xewkija (Gozo) | 2023 UEFA European Under-19 Championship is located in Malta | |
| Gozo Stadium | 2023 UEFA European Under-19 Championship is located in Malta | |
| Capacity: 1,644 | 2023 UEFA European Under-19 Championship is located in Malta | |

== Draw ==
The final draw was held on 19 April 2023, 13:00 CEST at Manoel Theatre, Valletta.

== Group stage ==
Tie-breaking criteria for group play
The ranking of teams in the group stage was determined as follows:
1. Points obtained in all group matches;
2. Points in head-to-head matches among tied teams;
3. Goal difference in head-to-head matches among tied teams;
4. Goals scored in head-to-head matches among tied teams;
5. If more than two teams were tied, and after applying all head-to-head criteria above, a subset of teams were still tied, all head-to-head criteria above were reapplied exclusively to this subset of teams;
6. Goal difference in all group matches;
7. Goals scored in all group matches;
8. Disciplinary points
  - Yellow card: −1 point;
  - Indirect red card (second yellow card): −3 points;
  - Direct red card: −3 points;
9. UEFA coefficient for the qualifying round draw;
10. Drawing of lots.

=== Group A ===
| Pos | Team | Pld | W | D | L | GF | GA | GD | Pts | Qualification |
|---|---|---|---|---|---|---|---|---|---|---|
| 1 | Portugal | 3 | 3 | 0 | 0 | 9 | 2 | +7 | 9 | Knockout stage |
| 2 | Italy | 3 | 1 | 1 | 1 | 6 | 6 | 0 | 4 | Knockout stage |
| 3 | Poland | 3 | 1 | 1 | 1 | 3 | 3 | 0 | 4 | |
| 4 | Malta | 3 | 0 | 0 | 3 | 1 | 8 | −7 | 0 | |

Source: UEFA
Rules for classification: Group stage tiebreakers
3 July 2023
18:00 CEST

| Poland | 0–2 | Portugal |
|---|---|---|
| | Report | Brás 4'; H. Félix 60' |

Tony Bezzina Stadium, Paola
Attendance: 772
Referee: Juxhin Xhaja (Albania)
3 July 2023
21:00 CEST

| Malta | 0–4 | Italy |
|---|---|---|
| | Report | Ndour 19' (pen.); Esposito 32' (pen.); D'Andrea 47'; Vignato 90+2' (pen.) |

Ta' Qali National Stadium, Ta' Qali
Attendance: 3,427
Referee: Yigal Frid (Israel)

6 July 2023
18:00 CEST

| Portugal | 5–1 | Italy |
|---|---|---|
| R. Ribeiro 35'; Sá 57'; Brás 68'; H. Félix 89'; Vasconcelos 90+1' | Report | Lipani 6' |

Centenary Stadium, Ta' Qali
Attendance: 1,328
Referee: Sven Jablonski (Germany)
6 July 2023
21:15 CEST

| Malta | 0–2 | Poland |
|---|---|---|
| | Report | Strzałek 59'; Pieńko 82' |

Centenary Stadium, Ta' Qali
Attendance: 1,618
Referee: Yael Falcón (Argentina)

9 July 2023
18:00 CEST

| Portugal | 2–1 | Malta |
|---|---|---|
| Falé 8'; Vasconcelos 75' | Report | Tuma 72' |

Gozo Stadium, Xewkija
Attendance: 894
Referee: Joonas Jaanovits (Estonia)
9 July 2023
18:00 CEST

| Italy | 1–1 | Poland |
|---|---|---|
| Hasa 34' | Report | Strzałek 8' |

Ta' Qali National Stadium, Ta' Qali
Attendance: 1,053
Referee: Gergo Bogár (Hungary)

=== Group B ===
| Pos | Team | Pld | W | D | L | GF | GA | GD | Pts | Qualification |
|---|---|---|---|---|---|---|---|---|---|---|
| 1 | Spain | 3 | 2 | 1 | 0 | 7 | 1 | +6 | 7 | Knockout stage |
| 2 | Norway | 3 | 1 | 2 | 0 | 6 | 5 | +1 | 5 | Knockout stage |
| 3 | Iceland | 3 | 0 | 2 | 1 | 2 | 3 | −1 | 2 | |
| 4 | Greece | 3 | 0 | 1 | 2 | 4 | 10 | −6 | 1 | |

Source: UEFA
Rules for classification: Group stage tiebreakers
4 July 2023
18:00 CEST

| Norway | 5–4 | Greece |
|---|---|---|
| Roaldsøy 6'; Ødegård 15', 44'; Flataker 18'; Skogvold 36' | Report | Tzimas 51', 81'; Stavropoulos 80'; Kalogeropoulos 90+5' |

Centenary Stadium, Ta' Qali
Attendance: 586
Referee: Joonas Jaanovits (Estonia)
4 July 2023
21:15 CEST

| Iceland | 1–2 | Spain |
|---|---|---|
| Þorsteinsson 90+1' | Report | Gasiorowski 16'; Barberà 47' |

Centenary Stadium, Ta' Qali
Attendance: 753
Referee: Gergo Bogár (Hungary)

7 July 2023
18:00 CEST

| Greece | 0–5 | Spain |
|---|---|---|
| | Report | Barberà 11', 45+1'; Ángel 14'; Palacios 17'; Casas 57' |

Gozo Stadium, Xewkija
Attendance: 479
Referee: Yigal Frid (Israel)
7 July 2023
21:00 CEST

| Iceland | 1–1 | Norway |
|---|---|---|
| Guðmundsson 89' | Report | Roaldsøy 65' (pen.) |

Tony Bezzina Stadium, Paola
Attendance: 532
Referee: Juxhin Xhaja (Albania)

10 July 2023
21:00 CEST

| Greece | 0–0 | Iceland |
|---|---|---|
| | Report |

Tony Bezzina Stadium, Paola
Attendance: 324
Referee: Sven Jablonski (Germany)
10 July 2023
21:00 CEST

| Spain | 0–0 | Norway |
|---|---|---|
| | Report |

Ta' Qali National Stadium, Ta' Qali
Attendance: 704
Referee: Yael Falcón (Argentina)

== Knockout stage ==
=== Bracket ===
Semi-finals
13 July – Paola
Portugal | 5
Norway | 0
13 July – Ta' Qali
Spain | 2
Italy | 3

Final
16 July – Ta' Qali
Portugal | 0
Italy | 1

=== Semi-finals ===
13 July 2023
18:00 CEST

| Portugal | 5–0 | Norway |
|---|---|---|
| Sá 6'; H. Félix 17' (pen.); Ribeiro 31', 66'; Forbs 69' | Report |

Tony Bezzina Stadium, Paola
Attendance: 709
Referee: Yael Falcón (Argentina)

13 July 2023
21:00 CEST

| Spain | 2–3 | Italy |
|---|---|---|
| Barberà 58'; Gasiorowski 74' | Report | Vignato 52'; Pisilli 66'; Lipani 85' |

Ta' Qali National Stadium, Ta' Qali
Attendance: 1,712
Referee: Yigal Frid (Israel)

=== Final ===
16 July 2023
21:00 CEST

| Portugal | 0–1 | Italy |
|---|---|---|
| | Report | Kayode 19' |

Ta' Qali National Stadium, Ta' Qali
Attendance: 5,648
Referee: Sven Jablonski (Germany)

== Goalscorers ==
There were 49 goals scored in 15 matches, for an average of 3.27 goals per match.

4 goals

- (Spain) Víctor Barberà

3 goals

- (Portugal) Hugo Félix
- (Portugal) Rodrigo Ribeiro

2 goals

- (Greece) Stefanos Tzimas
- (Italy) Luca Lipani
- (Italy) Samuele Vignato
- (Norway) Niklas Ødegård
- (Norway) Alwande Roaldsøy
- (Poland) Igor Strzałek
- (Portugal) Gabriel Brás
- (Portugal) Gustavo Sá
- (Portugal) João Vasconcelos
- (Spain) Yarek Gasiorowski

1 goal

- (Greece) Alexios Kalogeropoulos
- (Greece) Christos Stavropoulos
- (Iceland) Eggert Aron Guðmundsson
- (Iceland) Ágúst Orri Þorsteinsson
- (Italy) Luca D'Andrea
- (Italy) Francesco Pio Esposito
- (Italy) Luis Hasa
- (Italy) Michael Kayode
- (Italy) Cher Ndour
- (Italy) Niccolò Pisilli
- (Malta) Basil Tuma
- (Poland) Tomasz Pieńko
- (Portugal) Carlos Forbs
- (Portugal) Miguel Falé
- (Norway) Erik Flataker
- (Norway) Henrik Skogvold
- (Spain) Manuel Ángel
- (Spain) Arnau Casas
- (Spain) César Palacios

Source: UEFA

== Team of the Tournament ==
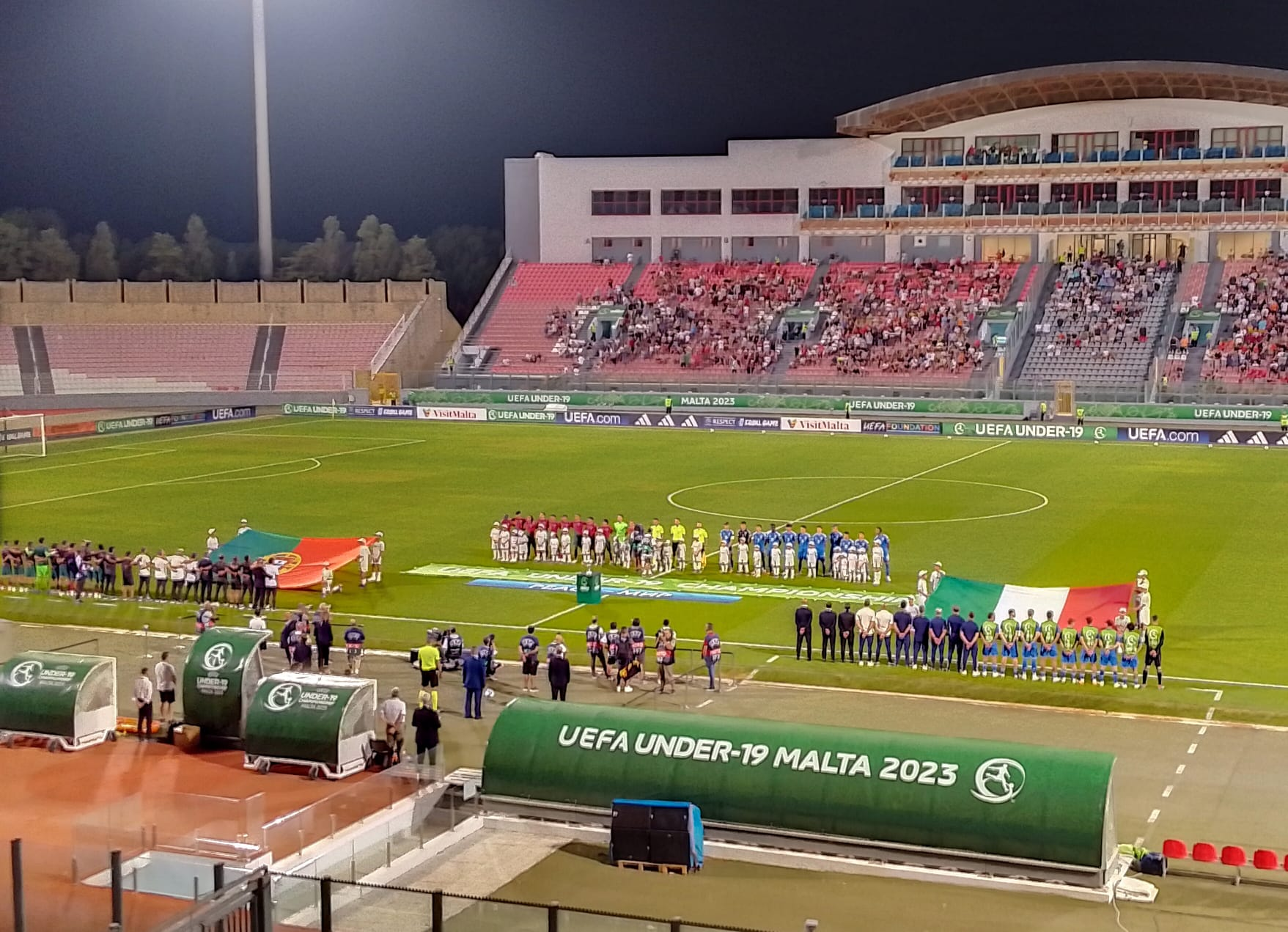
Portugal and Italy teams right before the beginning of the final match of the tournament.

The UEFA Technical Observer team announced the team of the tournament.

| Goalkeeper | Defenders | Midfielders | Forwards |
|---|---|---|---|
| (Portugal) Gonçalo Ribeiro | (Italy) Filippo Missori; (Italy) Alessandro Dellavalle; (Portugal) Gabriel Brás; (Spain) Álex Valle | (Norway) Niklas Ødegård; (Spain) César Palacios; (Italy) Luis Hasa | (Portugal) Hugo Félix; (Spain) Víctor Barberà; (Portugal) Carlos Forbs |
