= 2023–24 NK Osijek season =

Osijek
2023–24 season
- Owner: NK OS d.o.o.
- President: Ferenc Szakály
- Head coach: Stjepan Tomas (until 3 October 2023); Zoran Zekić (13 October 2023 - 21 May 2024)
- Stadium: Opus Arena
- HNL: 4th
- Croatian Cup: Quarter-finals
- UEFA Europa Conference League: Third qualifying round
- Top goalscorer: League: Ramón Miérez (19); All: Ramón Miérez (21)
- Highest home attendance: 12,222 v Dinamo Zagreb (3 September 2023)
- Lowest home attendance: 3,939 v Slaven Belupo (17 December 2023)
- Average home league attendance: 7,418
Home colours	Away colours

The 2023–24 NK Osijek season was the club's 77th season in existence and the 33rd consecutive season in the top flight of Croatian football. This was the first season for Osijek to play their home matches on the newly built Opus Arena.

== Players ==
As of 11 February 2024

Note: Flags indicate national team as defined under FIFA eligibility rules; some limited exceptions apply. Players may hold more than one non-FIFA nationality.

No.	Pos.	Nation	Player
1	GK	CRO	Jan Hlapčić
3	DF	POR	André Duarte
4	DF	CRO	Krešimir Vrbanac
5	DF	ARM	Styopa Mkrtchyan
6	MF	CRO	Darko Nejašmić
7	MF	CRO	Vedran Jugović (captain)
8	FW	CRO	Kristian Fućak
13	FW	ARG	Ramón Miérez (vice-captain)
15	GK	CRO	Marko Barešić
17	DF	CRO	Šime Gržan
18	MF	ALB	Enis Çokaj (on loan from Panathinaikos)
20	DF	CRO	Marin Prekodravac
22	DF	CRO	Roko Jurišić
23	MF	CRO	Petar Brlek
24	FW	CRO	Filip Živković
28	DF	CRO	Slavko Bralić

No.	Pos.	Nation	Player
31	GK	CRO	Marko Malenica
32	FW	CRO	Andrej Mićić
34	FW	CRO	Anton Matković
35	DF	CRO	Luka Zebec
36	MF	BIH	Nail Omerović
37	FW	CRO	Luka Branšteter
38	GK	CRO	Franko Kolić
39	FW	CRO	Domagoj Bukvić
41	FW	BIH	Amar Zahirović
42	DF	BRA	Renan Guedes
44	FW	CRO	Kristijan Lovrić
55	DF	UKR	Oleksandr Drambayev (on loan from Shakhtar Donetsk)
66	MF	SUI	Petar Pušić
98	MF	CRO	Šimun Mikolčić
99	FW	SVK	Ladislav Almási (on loan from Baník Ostrava)

== Transfers ==
=== In ===
Pos	Player	Transferred from	Fee	Date	Source
DF	(Croatia) Uwem Alexander	(Croatia) Hrvatski Dragovoljac	Return from loan	15 June 2023	
DF	(Croatia) Slavko Bralić	(Croatia) Gorica	Return from loan	15 June 2023	
DF	(Croatia) Luka Zebec	(Croatia) BSK Bijelo Brdo	Return from loan	15 June 2023	
MF	(Bosnia and Herzegovina) Amer Hiroš	(Croatia) Šibenik	Return from loan	15 June 2023	
FW	(Kosovo) Mirlind Daku	(Slovenia) Mura	Return from loan	15 June 2023	
FW	(Croatia) Kristian Fućak	(Croatia) Gorica	Return from loan	15 June 2023	
FW	(Croatia) Vinko Petković	(Croatia) Gorica	Return from loan	15 June 2023	
DF	(Greece) Stefanos Evangelou	(Moldova) Sheriff Tiraspol	Free	20 June 2023	
DF	(Brazil) Renan Guedes	(Moldova) Sheriff Tiraspol	Free	24 June 2023	
DF	(Ukraine) Oleksandr Drambayev	(Ukraine) Shakhtar Donetsk	Loan	1 July 2023	
MF	(Switzerland) Petar Pušić	(Switzerland) Grasshopper	Free	17 July 2023	
DF	(Armenia) Styopa Mkrtchyan	Ararat-Armenia	Loan	21 July 2023	
DF	(Portugal) André Duarte	(Italy) Reggiana	Loan	30 August 2023	
DF	(North Macedonia) Jovan Manev	(Turkey) Adana Demirspor	Loan	5 September 2023	
MF	(Ukraine) Denys Harmash	(Ukraine) Dynamo Kyiv	Free	6 September 2023	
MF	(Croatia) Šimun Mikolčić	(Bosnia and Herzegovina) Široki Brijeg	Recalled from loan	20 December 2023	
GK	(Croatia) Franko Kolić	(Bosnia and Herzegovina) Posušje	Recalled from loan	21 December 2023	
DF	(Croatia) Roko Jurišić	(Slovenia) Mura	Undisclosed	3 January 2024	
DF	(Armenia) Styopa Mkrtchyan	Ararat-Armenia	€300,000	23 January 2024	
MF	(Albania) Enis Çokaj	(Greece) Panathinaikos	Loan	24 January 2024	
FW	(Montenegro) Nikola Janjić	(Slovenia) Bravo	Recalled from loan	29 January 2024	
DF	(Portugal) André Duarte	(Italy) Reggiana	€300,000	1 February 2024	
FW	(Slovakia) Ladislav Almási	(Czech Republic) Baník Ostrava	Loan	5 February 2024	

=== Out ===
Pos	Player	Transferred to	Fee	Date	Source
DF	(Ukraine) Yevhen Cheberko	(United States) Columbus Crew	€1,000,000	9 June 2023	
GK	(Croatia) Franko Kolić	(Bosnia and Herzegovina) Posušje	Loan	24 June 2023	
DF	(Slovenia) Mario Jurčević	(Cyprus) Apollon Limassol	Free	30 June 2023	
DF	(Croatia) Marin Leovac	(Croatia) Lokomotiva	Free	30 June 2023	
MF	(Spain) Diego Barri	(Spain) Cultural Leonesa	Free	30 June 2023	
FW	(Austria) Mihret Topčagić	Free agent	End of contract	30 June 2023	
DF	(Croatia) Uwem Alexander	(Croatia) Bjelovar	Free	4 July 2023	
FW	(Kosovo) Mirlind Daku	(Russia) Rubin Kazan	€1,200,000	11 July 2023	
FW	(Montenegro) Nikola Janjić	(Slovenia) Bravo	Loan	14 July 2023	
DF	(Croatia) Ivan Cvijanović	(Croatia) Šibenik	Loan	20 July 2023	
GK	(Croatia) Tin Sajko	(Croatia) Vukovar 1991	Dual registration	21 July 2023	
DF	(Bosnia and Herzegovina) Adrian Leon Barišić	(Switzerland) Basel	€3,000,000	18 August 2023	
MF	(Montenegro) Ognjen Bakić	(Turkey) Trabzonspor	Released	21 August 2023	
FW	(Croatia) Vinko Petković	(Croatia) Rudeš	Loan	25 August 2023	
FW	(Croatia) Josip Špoljarić	(Hungary) Zalaegerszeg	Released	28 August 2023	
MF	(Croatia) Mihael Žaper	(Croatia) Hajduk Split	€1,000,000	4 September 2023	
DF	(Greece) Stefanos Evangelou	(Hungary) Zalaegerszeg	Loan	7 September 2023	
MF	(Croatia) Šimun Mikolčić	(Bosnia and Herzegovina) Široki Brijeg	Loan	8 September 2023	
DF	(North Macedonia) Jovan Manev	(Turkey) Adana Demirspor	Recalled from loan	18 December 2023	
MF	(Croatia) Ivan Fiolić	(China) Tianjin Jinmen Tiger	Released	18 December 2023	
MF	(Bosnia and Herzegovina) Amer Hiroš	(Bosnia and Herzegovina) Željezničar Sarajevo	Released	12 January 2024	
DF	(Armenia) Styopa Mkrtchyan	Ararat-Armenia	Return from loan	12 January 2024	
MF	(Ukraine) Denys Harmash	(Ukraine) Metalist 1925 Kharkiv	Released	16 January 2024	
GK	(Croatia) Tin Sajko	(Croatia) Jarun	Loan	21 January 2024	
MF	(Croatia) Mijo Caktaš	(Turkey) Sivasspor	Released	31 January 2024	
DF	(Portugal) André Duarte	(Italy) Reggiana	Return from loan	1 February 2024	
FW	(Montenegro) Nikola Janjić	(Slovakia) Komárno	Loan	7 February 2024	

▼ Total Spending: €600,000

▲ Total Income: €6,200,000

▲ Net Income: €5,600,000

== Competitions ==
=== Overall record ===
Competition	First match	Last match	Starting round	Final position	Record							
Competition	First match	Last match	Starting round	Final position	Pld	W	D	L	GF	GA	GD	Win %
SuperSport HNL	22 July 2023	25 May 2024	Matchday 1	4th	36	16	9	11	62	43	+19	44.44
Croatian Cup	26 September 2023	27 February 2024	First round	Quarter-finals	3	2	0	1	5	2	+3	66.67
UEFA Europa Conference League	27 July 2023	17 August 2023	Second qualifying round	Third qualifying round	4	3	0	1	7	8	−1	75.00
Total					43	21	9	13	74	53	+21	48.84

Last updated: 26 May 2024
Source: Soccerway

=== SuperSport HNL ===
==== League table ====
Pos	Team	Pld	W	D	L	GF	GA	GD	Pts	Qualification or relegation
2	Rijeka	36	23	5	8	69	30	+39	74	Qualification to Europa League second qualifying round (Note: The 2023–24 Croatian Football Cup winners qualified for the Europa League second qualifying round. Since the cup winners (Dinamo Zagreb) qualified for the Champions League, the Europa League spot was passed to the second-placed team, and the second Conference League second qualifying round spot was passed to the fourth-placed team.)
3	Hajduk Split	36	21	5	10	54	26	+28	68	Qualification to Conference League second qualifying round
4	Osijek	36	16	9	11	62	43	+19	57	Qualification to Conference League second qualifying round
5	Lokomotiva	36	12	15	9	52	45	+7	51	
6	Varaždin	36	10	12	14	39	47	−8	42	

Source: SuperSport HNL
Rules for classification: 1) Points; 2) Head-to-head points; 3) Head-to-head goal difference; 4) Head-to-head goals scored (at home if two teams tied); 5) Goal difference; 6) Goals scored; 7) Play-off
(Note: Criteria 2-4 and 7 is only used if deciding champion, teams to international competition or teams for relegation and in that case criteria 6 will not be used).

==== Results summary ====
Overall								Home						Away					
Pld	W	D	L	GF	GA	GD	Pts	W	D	L	GF	GA	GD	W	D	L	GF	GA	GD
36	16	9	11	62	43	+19	57	9	5	4	34	15	+19	7	4	7	28	28	0

Last updated: 26 May 2024.
Source: SuperSport HNL

==== Results by round ====
Round	1	2	3	4	5	6	7	8	9	10	11	12	13	14	15	16	17	18	19	20	21	22	23	24	25	26	27	28	29	30	31	32	33	34	35	36
Ground	H	A	H	A	H	A	H	A	H	A	H	A	H	A	H	A	H	A	H	H	H	A	H	A	H	A	H	A	A	A	H	A	H	A	H	A
Result	W	W	L	D	W	D	L	L	D	L	W	W	W	L	D	L	D	D	W	W	D	L	W	D	D	L	L	W	W	W	L	W	W	L	W	W
Position	1	1	3	3	3	3	4	6	5	7	6	5	4	5	5	5	5	5	4	4	4	4	4	4	4	4	5	5	4	4	4	4	4	4	4	4

Updated to match(es) played on 26 May 2024. Source: SuperSport HNL
A = Away; H = Home; W = Win; D = Draw; L = Loss

==== Matches ====
22 July 2023 1	Osijek	6–1	Slaven Belupo	Osijek
21:00 CEST (UTC+02:00)	Miérez 4'; Caktaš 18'; Fućak 36'; Nejašmić 63'; Bukvić 71'; Lovrić 83'	Report	Martinaga (yellow card) 18'; Crnac 29'; Mioč (yellow card) 31'; Cascini (yellow card) 35'; Manaj (yellow card) 57'	Stadium: Opus Arena; Attendance: 9,992; Referee: Jakov Titlić

30 July 2023 2	Rudeš	3–4	Osijek	Zagreb
18:45 CEST (UTC+02:00)	Lazarov 23'; Pasariček 34', 39'; Ljubanović (yellow card) 57'; Camara (yellow card) 81'	Report	Miérez 43'; Mkrtchyan (yellow card) 45+2'; Fiolić (yellow card) 45+5'; Caktaš 76', 83', 89'; Evangelou (yellow card) 87'	Stadium: Stadion Kranjčevićeva; Attendance: 872; Referee: Mario Zebec

13 August 2023 4	Istra 1961	4–4	Osijek	Pula
18:55 CEST (UTC+02:00)	Erceg (yellow card) 11'; Majstorović 28'; Nebyla 50'; Guedes 84' (o.g.); Mkrtchyan 90+1' (o.g.); Ćorić (yellow card) 90+7'	Report	Mkrtchyan 22'; Fiolić (yellow card) 39'; Evangelou (yellow card) 43'; Caktaš 48' (yellow card) 76'; Lovrić 58' (pen.); Nejašmić 60'; Hiroš (yellow card) 90+6'	Stadium: Stadion Aldo Drosina; Attendance: 2,133; Referee: Igor Pajač

20 August 2023 5	Osijek	1–0	Gorica	Osijek
21:00 CEST (UTC+02:00)	Caktaš 30' (yellow card) 43'; Brlek (yellow card) 66'	Report		Stadium: Opus Arena; Attendance: 6,679; Referee: Ante Čulina

26 August 2023 6	Lokomotiva	2–2	Osijek	Zagreb
21:05 CEST (UTC+02:00)	Bubanja 63'; Mersinaj (yellow card) 66'; Kulenović (yellow card) 75' (goal) 90+5'; Bulatović (yellow card) 90+2'; Kalaica (yellow card) 90+3'; Marić (red card) 90+7'	Report	Caktaš 31'; Pušić (yellow card) 89'; Jugović 90+3'	Stadium: Stadion Kranjčevićeva; Attendance: 912; Referee: Duje Strukan

3 September 2023 7	Osijek	2–3	Dinamo Zagreb	Osijek
21:05 CEST (UTC+02:00)	Miérez 7'; Bukvić (yellow card) 25' (goal) 47'; Lovrić (yellow card) 36'; Caktaš (yellow card) 45+2'; Guedes (yellow card) 53'	Report	Perić (yellow card) 58'; Emreli 70'; Petković 87' (pen.), 90+9' (pen.)	Stadium: Opus Arena; Attendance: 12,222; Referee: Mario Zebec

16 September 2023 8	Rijeka	2–1	Osijek	Rijeka
19:30 CEST (UTC+02:00)	Selahi (yellow card) 45+1'; Pjaca 47', 55'	Report	Manev (yellow card) 31'; Pušić (yellow card) 45+1' (goal) 85'; Harmash (yellow card) 67'; Lovrić (yellow card) 69'; Živković (yellow card) 90+5'	Stadium: Stadion Rujevica; Attendance: 6,373; Referee: Patrik Kolarić

22 September 2023 9	Osijek	1–1	Varaždin	Osijek
18:00 CEST (UTC+02:00)	Miérez 54'; Bukvić (yellow card) 61'; Pušić (yellow card) 75'; Manev (yellow card) 77'	Report	Elezi 14'	Stadium: Opus Arena; Attendance: 5,777; Referee: Igor Pajač

30 September 2023 10	Slaven Belupo	1–0	Osijek	Koprivnica
19:15 CEST (UTC+02:00)	Lepinjica (yellow card) 41'; Mioč 54'; Bosec (yellow card) 60'; Ortiz (yellow card) 88'; Sušak (yellow card) 90+3'	Report	Gržan (yellow card) 65'; Manev (yellow card) 88'; Lovrić (yellow card) 90+3'; Hiroš (yellow card) 90+6'	Stadium: Gradski stadion Attendance: 708; Referee: Ante Čulina

7 October 2023 11	Osijek	3–0	Rudeš	Osijek
16:00 CEST (UTC+02:00)	Bukvić (yellow card) 3'; Miérez 45+1'; Fiolić 80'; Nejašmić 90+4'	Report	Srbljinović (yellow card) 37'; Topić (yellow card) 79'; Kovačević (yellow card) 90+4'	Stadium: Opus Arena; Attendance: 4,222; Referee: Ante Terzić

22 October 2023 12	Hajduk Split	0–2	Osijek	Split
18:00 CEST (UTC+02:00)	Šarlija (yellow card) 25'; Sigur (yellow card) 32'; Diallo (yellow card) 84'	Report	Gržan (yellow card) 34'; Brlek 46'; Omerović (yellow card) 61'; Lovrić (yellow card) 68'; Lučić 73' (o.g.)	Stadium: Stadion Poljud; Attendance: 22,605; Referee: Fran Jović

28 October 2023 13	Osijek	3–1	Istra 1961	Osijek
18:10 CEST (UTC+02:00)	Jugović 47', 68', 90+4' (pen.)	Report	Devetak (yellow card) 37'; Petrusenko (yellow card) 74'; Douglas (yellow card) 90+1'; Filet 90+5'	Stadium: Opus Arena; Attendance: 6,928; Referee: Jakov Titlić

4 November 2023 14	Gorica	3–0	Osijek	Velika Gorica
16:00 CET (UTC+01:00)	Štiglec 45+2'; Pršir (yellow card) 63' (goal) 87'; Soldo 83'	Report	Jugović (yellow card) 41'; Omerović (yellow card) 61'; Bralić (yellow card) 72'	Stadium: Stadion Radnik; Attendance: 1,878; Referee: Duje Strukan

8 November 2023 3	Osijek	0–1	Hajduk Split	Osijek
17:00 CET (UTC+01:00)		Report	Sahiti (yellow card) 41'; Livaja 42'	Stadium: Opus Arena; Attendance: 11,105; Referee: Ante Čulina

11 November 2023 15	Osijek	1–1	Lokomotiva	Osijek
18:10 CET (UTC+01:00)	Fiolić (yellow card) 62' (goal) 88'; Omerović (yellow card) 90+2'	Report	Tuci 11'; Kanižaj (yellow card) 72'	Stadium: Opus Arena; Attendance: 4,817; Referee: Mateo Erceg

25 November 2023 16	Dinamo Zagreb	2–1	Osijek	Zagreb
17:30 CET (UTC+01:00)	Bulat 24'; Vidović 90'	Report	Gržan (yellow card) 8'; Lovrić (yellow card) 34'; Drambayev (yellow card) 65'; Matković 75'; Brlek (yellow card) 90'	Stadium: Stadion Maksimir; Attendance: 5,402; Referee: Duje Strukan

2 December 2023 17	Osijek	0–0	Rijeka	Osijek
15:00 CET (UTC+01:00)	Bralić (yellow card) 29'; Miérez (yellow card) 87'	Report	Smolčić (yellow card) 27'; Pašalić (yellow card) 64'; Janković (yellow card) 68'; Dilaver (yellow card) 90+3'; Obregón (yellow card) 90+5'	Stadium: Opus Arena; Attendance: 7,425; Referee: Mateo Erceg

10 December 2023 18	Varaždin	2–2	Osijek	Varaždin
15:00 CET (UTC+01:00)	Postonjski 38' (pen.); Pilj 69'; Zelenika (yellow card) 85'	Report	Miérez 6'; Caktaš (yellow card) 41'; Duarte (yellow card) 76'; Bralić 90+2'; Brlek (yellow card) 90+4'	Stadium: Stadion Varteks; Attendance: 1,203; Referee: Fran Jović

17 December 2023 19	Osijek	4–1	Slaven Belupo	Osijek
14:30 CET (UTC+01:00)	Lovrić 17', 32'; Prekodravac (yellow card) 45'; Omerović 49'; Miérez 88'	Report	Šakota 66' (yellow card) 72'; Boras (yellow card) 85'	Stadium: Opus Arena; Attendance: 3,939; Referee: Ante Čulina

27 January 2024 20	Osijek	2–0	Rudeš	Osijek
14:50 CET (UTC+01:00)	Lovrić 14'; Miérez 26' (yellow card) 70'; Prekodravac (yellow card) 34'; Jugović (yellow card) 89'	Report	Šehić (yellow card) 72'; Pavlović (yellow card) 87'	Stadium: Opus Arena; Attendance: 4,088; Referee: Menelaos Antoniou

3 February 2024 21	Osijek	1–1	Hajduk Split	Osijek
17:30 CET (UTC+01:00)	Omerović (yellow card) 57'; Bralić (yellow card) 69'; Miérez 72'; Matković (yellow card) 75'; Pušić (yellow card) 90+3'	Report	Mikanović (yellow card) 28'; Uremović 57' (yellow card) 80'	Stadium: Opus Arena; Attendance: 11,711; Referee: Igor Pajač

10 February 2024 22	Istra 1961	1–0	Osijek	Pula
15:00 CET (UTC+01:00)	Kadušić (yellow card) 27'; Erceg (yellow card) 32'; Ekong 43'; Čuić (yellow card) 64'	Report	Malenica (yellow card) 43'; Jugović (yellow card) 90+10'	Stadium: Stadion Aldo Drosina; Attendance: 1,019; Referee: Patrik Kolarić

18 February 2024 23	Osijek	3–0	Gorica	Osijek
15:00 CET (UTC+01:00)	Miérez 50'; Pušić 63'; Almási 72'	Report	Soldo (yellow card) 47'; Lazarov (yellow card) 84'	Stadium: Opus Arena; Attendance: 5,617; Referee: Fran Jović

23 February 2024 24	Lokomotiva	1–1	Osijek	Zagreb
17:00 CET (UTC+01:00)	Smakaj 31' (yellow card) 90+8'; Mersinaj (yellow card) 45'	Report	Miérez 90+4' (pen.)	Stadium: Stadion Kranjčevićeva; Attendance: 822; Referee: Mateo Erceg

3 March 2024 25	Osijek	1–1	Dinamo Zagreb	Osijek
17:30 CET (UTC+01:00)	Bukvić 27'; Çokaj (yellow card) 53'; Miérez (yellow card) 87'	Report	Kulenović (yellow card) 87' (goal) 90+4'; Petković (yellow card) 90+8'	Stadium: Opus Arena; Attendance: 11,450; Referee: Igor Pajač

10 March 2024 26	Rijeka	3–0	Osijek	Rijeka
15:00 CET (UTC+01:00)	Hodža 21', 23', 63'; Veiga (yellow card) 59'	Report	Çokaj (yellow card) 36'; Pušić (yellow card) 54'	Stadium: Stadion Rujevica; Attendance: 6,718; Referee: Duje Strukan

15 March 2024 27	Osijek	0–1	Varaždin	Osijek
17:00 CET (UTC+01:00)	Matković (yellow card) 39'; Pušić (yellow card) 48'; Bukvić (yellow card) 51'; Miérez (yellow card) 90+3'	Report	Belcar 13'; Jelenić (yellow card) 17'; Drožđek (yellow card) 90+1'	Stadium: Opus Arena; Attendance: 4,550; Referee: Mateo Erceg

29 March 2024 28	Slaven Belupo	0–1	Osijek	Koprivnica
18:00 CET (UTC+01:00)	Božić (yellow card) 11'; Štefulj (yellow card) 36'; Jelić Balta (yellow card) 70'; Pllana (yellow card) 82'	Report	Miérez 6' (yellow card) 90+4'; Bralić (yellow card) 69'	Stadium: Gradski stadion Attendance: 1,179; Referee: Fran Jović

5 April 2024 29	Rudeš	2–3	Osijek	Zagreb
16:30 CEST (UTC+02:00)	Mrčela 11', 79' (yellow card) 81'; Mašala (yellow card) 19'; Magđinski (yellow card) 28'; Vukmanović (yellow card) 45+1'; Petković (yellow card) 71'; Golem (yellow card) 89'	Report	Pušić 35' (yellow card) 62'; Lovrić 56', 59'; Brlek (yellow card) 61'; Nejašmić (yellow card) 90+2'	Stadium: ŠC Rudeš; Attendance: 700; Referee: Ante Terzić

14 April 2024 30	Hajduk Split	1–2	Osijek	Split
16:30 CEST (UTC+02:00)	Trajkovski 28'; Sahiti (yellow card) 56'; N. Kalinić (yellow card) 81'	Report	Matković 19'; Miérez 42'; Mkrtchyan (yellow card) 71'; Çokaj (yellow card) 82'; Kolić (yellow card) 90+7'	Stadium: Stadion Poljud; Attendance: 0 Referee: Fran Jović

20 April 2024 31	Osijek	1–2	Istra 1961	Osijek
17:00 CEST (UTC+02:00)	Miérez 14'; Bralić (red card) 37'; Lovrić (yellow card) 45'	Report	Vuk 39' (yellow card) 63'; Valinčić (yellow card) 42'; Filet (yellow card) 45+4'; Ekong 51'; Petrusenko (yellow card) 84'	Stadium: Opus Arena; Attendance: 5,782; Referee: Ante Čulina

28 April 2024 32	Gorica	0–3	Osijek	Velika Gorica
17:00 CEST (UTC+02:00)		Report	Miérez 45+1', 52', 80'; Guedes (yellow card) 71'	Stadium: Stadion Radnik; Attendance: 812; Referee: Fran Jović

4 May 2024 33	Osijek	3–1	Lokomotiva	Osijek
19:30 CEST (UTC+02:00)	Nejašmić (yellow card) 64'; Matković 65', 79'; Miérez 76'	Report	Bubanja (yellow card) 52'; Bartolec (red card) 57'; Šotiček 90'	Stadium: Opus Arena; Attendance: 7,102; Referee: Jakov Titlić

11 May 2024 34	Dinamo Zagreb	1–0	Osijek	Zagreb
19:30 CEST (UTC+02:00)	Ristovski (yellow card) 35'; Ademi 73'; Špikić (yellow card) 81'	Report	Duarte (red card) 63'; Guedes (yellow card) 64'; Fućak (yellow card) 90+4'	Stadium: Stadion Maksimir; Attendance: 18,126; Referee: Patrik Kolarić

19 May 2024 35	Osijek	2–0	Rijeka	Osijek
19:30 CEST (UTC+02:00)	Jurišić 5'; Omerović (yellow card) 57'; Matković 72'; Bralić (yellow card) 81'; Prekodravac (yellow card) 81'	Report	Čabraja (yellow card) 21'; Banda (yellow card) 68'; Fruk (yellow card) 83'; Smolčić (yellow card) 84'; Dilaver (yellow card) 84'	Stadium: Opus Arena; Attendance: 10,112; Referee: Duje Strukan

25 May 2024 36	Varaždin	0–2	Osijek	Varaždin
17:00 CEST (UTC+02:00)	Nekić (yellow card) 32'; Ba (yellow card) 57'	Report	Miérez 65'; Bukvić 68'; Fućak (yellow card) 90+1'	Stadium: Stadion Varteks; Attendance: 1,130; Referee: Ante Terzić

=== Croatian Cup ===
26 September 2023 First round	Kutjevo	1–4	Osijek	Kutjevo
15:30 CEST (UTC+02:00)	Antunović 18'	Report	Lovrić 27'; Caktaš 45+1'; Bralić 53'; Miérez 90+1'	Stadium: ŠRC Kutjevo; Attendance: 1,000; Referee: Goran Pečarić

31 October 2023 Second round	Karlovac 1919	0–1	Osijek	Karlovac
17:30 CET (UTC+01:00)	Stepinac (yellow card) 83'	Report	Drambayev (yellow card) 15'; Lovrić 21' (pen.); Pušić (yellow card) 65'; Mkrtchyan (yellow card) 72'	Stadium: Stadion Branko Čavlović-Čavlek; Attendance: 1,500; Referee: Jakov Titlić

27 February 2024 Quarter-finals	Lokomotiva	1–0	Osijek	Zagreb
15:00 CET (UTC+01:00)	Mersinaj (yellow card) 45' (yellow-red card) 62'; Mudražija 51' (yellow card) 87'; Marić (yellow card) 90+7'	Report	Gržan (yellow card) 32'; Bralić (yellow card) 50'; Guedes (yellow card) 73'	Stadium: Stadion Kranjčevićeva; Attendance: 650; Referee: Patrik Kolarić

=== UEFA Europa Conference League ===
==== Second qualifying round ====
27 July 2023 First leg	Osijek (Croatia)	1–0	(Hungary) Zalaegerszeg	Osijek, Croatia
20:00 CEST (UTC+02:00)	Miérez (yellow card) 50' (goal) 90+1'; Bukvić (yellow card) 80'	Report	Ubochioma (yellow card) 48'; Tajti (yellow card) 53'	Stadium: Opus Arena; Attendance: 12,011; Referee: Bastian Dankert (Germany)

3 August 2023 Second leg	Zalaegerszeg (Hungary)	1–2 (1–3 agg.)	(Croatia) Osijek	Zalaegerszeg, Hungary
18:45 CEST (UTC+02:00)	Ikoba (yellow card) 42' (goal) 82'; Huszti (yellow card) 63'; Gergényi (yellow card) 70'; Mocsi (yellow card) 84'	Report	Gergényi 9' (o.g.); Mkrtchyan (yellow card) 72'; Špoljarić 73'; Malenica (yellow card) 90'; Brlek (yellow card) 90+7'	Stadium: ZTE Arena; Attendance: 5,347; Referee: Gal Leibovitz (Israel)

==== Third qualifying round ====
10 August 2023 First leg	Adana Demirspor (Turkey)	5–1	(Croatia) Osijek	Adana. Turkey
21:00 TRT (UTC+03:00)	Svensson 3'; Sari 16'; Ndiaye 52', 67' (pen.); Belhanda (yellow card) 72'; Erdoğan 88'	Report	Brlek (yellow card) 65'; Lovrić (yellow card) 66'; Malenica (yellow card) 66'; Gržan 73' (pen.); Evangelou (yellow card) 78'	Stadium: New Adana Stadium; Attendance: 17,719; Referee: Goga Kikacheishvili (Georgia)

17 August 2023 Second leg	Osijek (Croatia)	3–2 (4–7 agg.)	(Turkey) Adana Demirspor	Osijek, Croatia
20:00 CEST (UTC+02:00)	Lovrić (yellow card) 15'; Bukvić (yellow card) 17'; Nejašmić 43'; Caktaš 59'; Gržan (yellow card) 76' (goal) 82' (pen.); Brlek (yellow card) 84'	Report	Ndiaye (yellow card) 28'; Sari 31'; Stambouli (yellow card) 42'; Gravillon (yellow card) 71'; Güler (yellow card) 82'; Nani (yellow card) 84'; Erdoğan 90+1'	Stadium: Opus Arena; Attendance: 8,444; Referee: John Brooks (England)

=== Friendlies ===
==== Pre-season ====
25 June 2023 Friendly	Graničar Laze	0–9 (Note: The game was played with 35 minute halves.)	Osijek	Laze
18:00 CEST (UTC+02:00)		Report	Bralić 5'; Babić 13' (o.g.); Caktaš 18'; Bukvić 35'; Miérez 37', 39'; Špoljarić 49', 54'; Gržan 58'	Stadium: Poloj; Attendance: 400

2 July 2023 Friendly	Osijek (Croatia)	3–2	(Czech Republic) Bohemians 1905	Radenci, Slovenia
17:30 CEST (UTC+02:00)	Bukvić 62'; Gržan 75'; Živković 80'	Report	Kozák 37'; Prekop 65'	Stadium: Nogometno igrišče Referee: Slavko Nemet

5 July 2023 Friendly	Osijek (Croatia)	1–1	(Romania) Petrolul Ploiești	Križevci pri Ljutomeru, Slovenia
17:30 CEST (UTC+02:00)	Evangelou (yellow card) 43'; Špoljarić 85'	Report	Budescu 34'

8 July 2023 Friendly	Osijek (Croatia)	0–2	(Hungary) Fehérvár	Sveti Martin na Muri, Croatia
16:30 CEST (UTC+02:00)	Lovrić (yellow card) 10'	Report	Houri (yellow card) 10'; Kastrati 42'; Zeke (yellow card) 51'; Schön (yellow card) 57'; Kodro 90+2'	Stadium: NK POLET (SMnM)

15 July 2023 Friendly	Shabab Al Ahli (United Arab Emirates)	0–2	(Croatia) Osijek	Stara Pazova, Serbia
18:00 CEST (UTC+02:00)		Report	Lovrić 16'; Evangelou 55'	Stadium: Sportski centar FSS

==== On-season (2023) ====
9 September 2023 Friendly	Osijek (Croatia)	1–1	(Hungary) Puskás Akadémia	Osijek, Croatia
19:00 CEST (UTC+02:00)	Duarte 13'	Report	Gruber 6'	Stadium: Opus Arena; Attendance: 4,000

12 September 2023 Friendly	Olimpija Osijek	0–9	Osijek	Osijek
16:30 CEST (UTC+02:00)		Report	Caktaš; Miérez; Nejašmić; Gržan (pen.); Brlek; Ivančan; Prekodravac	Stadium: NK Olimpija; Attendance: 300

14 October 2023 Friendly	Vukovar 1991	2–0	Osijek	Vukovar
12:30 CEST (UTC+02:00)	Knöll 9'; Mustedanagić 29'	Report		Stadium: Gradski stadion Vukovar; Attendance: 300

15 November 2023 Friendly	Fruškogorac Ilok	0–6	Osijek	Ilok
16:00 CET (UTC+01:00)		Report	Lovrić; Pušić; Hiroš	Stadium: Stadion Tomislav Bošnjak

==== Mid-season ====
10 January 2024 Friendly	Osijek	3–1	Zrinski Osječko 1664	Osijek
12:00 CET (UTC+01:00)	Baković 60'; Pušić 81'; Jurišić 89'	Report	Unušić 57'	Stadium: Opus Arena (training ground); Attendance: 50; Referee: Dario Bel

13 January 2024 Friendly	Koper (Slovenia)	0–2	(Croatia) Osijek	Koper, Slovenia
15:30 CET (UTC+01:00)		Report	Bralić 32'; Guedes (yellow card) 59'; Zahirović 75'	Stadium: Athletic Stadium Bonifika; Attendance: 100; Referee: Mateo Tozan

16 January 2024 Friendly	Osijek (Croatia)	0–1	(Slovenia) Celje	Novigrad, Croatia
13:00 CET (UTC+01:00)		Report	Prutsev 54'; Dulca (yellow card) 79'	Stadium: Laco Stadium; Referee: Amel Dizdarević

20 January 2024 Friendly	Osijek (Croatia)	0–0	(North Macedonia) Makedonija G.P.	Petrovija, Croatia
10:30 CET (UTC+01:00)	Zahirović (yellow card) 58'	Report		Stadium: NK Petrovija; Referee: Mateo Čalić

20 January 2024 Friendly	Osijek (Croatia)	2–0	(Hungary) Fehérvár	Novigrad, Croatia
14:00 CET (UTC+01:00)	Nejašmić (yellow card) 20'; Omerović 69'; Miérez 80'	Report	Szabó (yellow card) 20'; Bese (yellow card) 66'; Schön (yellow card) 67'; Csongvai (yellow card) 69'	Stadium: Laco Stadium; Referee: Amel Dizdarević

==== On-season (2024) ====
23 March 2024 Friendly	TSC (Serbia)	2–1	(Croatia) Osijek	Bačka Topola, Serbia
15:00 CET (UTC+01:00)	Rakonjac 6'; Vlalukin (yellow card) 42'; Čolić (yellow card) 49'; Đorđević 78'; Ćirković (yellow card) 80'	Report	Miérez 14'	Stadium: TSC Arena; Attendance: 500

== Player seasonal records ==
Updated 26 May 2024

=== Goals ===
Rank	Name	League	Europe	Cup	Total
1	(Argentina) Ramón Miérez	19	1	1	21
2	(Croatia) Mijo Caktaš	7	1	1	9
2	(Croatia) Kristijan Lovrić	7	–	2	9
4	(Croatia) Anton Matković	5	–	–	5
5	(Croatia) Domagoj Bukvić	4	–	–	4
5	(Croatia) Vedran Jugović	4	–	–	4
5	(Croatia) Darko Nejašmić	3	1	–	4
8	(Switzerland) Petar Pušić	3	–	–	3
9	(Croatia) Ivan Fiolić	2	–	–	2
9	(Croatia) Slavko Bralić	1	–	1	2
9	(Croatia) Šime Gržan	–	2	–	2
12	(Slovakia) Ladislav Almási	1	–	–	1
12	(Croatia) Petar Brlek	1	–	–	1
12	(Croatia) Kristian Fućak	1	–	–	1
12	(Croatia) Roko Jurišić	1	–	–	1
12	(Armenia) Styopa Mkrtchyan	1	–	–	1
12	(Bosnia and Herzegovina) Nail Omerović	1	–	–	1
12	(Croatia) Josip Špoljarić	–	1	–	1
Own goals		1	1	–	2
TOTALS		62	7	5	74

Source: Competitive matches

=== Clean sheets ===
Rank	Name	League	Europe	Cup	Total
1	(Croatia) Marko Malenica	7	1	1	9
2	(Croatia) Franko Kolić	3	–	–	3
TOTALS		10	1	1	12

Source: Competitive matches

=== Disciplinary record ===
Number	Position	Player	HNL			Europe			Croatian Cup			Total		
Number	Position	Player	Yellow card	(yellow card) (yellow-red card)	Red card	Yellow card	(yellow card) (yellow-red card)	Red card	Yellow card	(yellow card) (yellow-red card)	Red card	Yellow card	(yellow card) (yellow-red card)	Red card
3	DF	(Portugal) André Duarte	1	0	1	0	0	0	0	0	0	1	0	1
4	DF	(North Macedonia) Jovan Manev	3	0	0	0	0	0	0	0	0	3	0	0
5	DF	(Armenia) Styopa Mkrtchyan	2	0	0	1	0	0	1	0	0	4	0	0
6	MF	(Croatia) Darko Nejašmić	2	0	0	0	0	0	0	0	0	2	0	0
7	MF	(Croatia) Vedran Jugović	3	0	0	0	0	0	0	0	0	3	0	0
8	FW	(Croatia) Kristian Fućak	2	0	0	0	0	0	0	0	0	2	0	0
11	MF	(Croatia) Mijo Caktaš	4	0	0	0	0	0	0	0	0	4	0	0
13	FW	(Argentina) Ramón Miérez	5	0	0	1	0	0	0	0	0	6	0	0
14	MF	(Croatia) Ivan Fiolić	3	0	0	0	0	0	0	0	0	3	0	0
17	DF	(Croatia) Šime Gržan	3	0	0	1	0	0	1	0	0	5	0	0
18	MF	(Albania) Enis Çokaj	3	0	0	0	0	0	0	0	0	3	0	0
19	MF	(Ukraine) Denys Harmash	1	0	0	0	0	0	0	0	0	1	0	0
20	DF	(Croatia) Marin Prekodravac	3	0	0	0	0	0	0	0	0	3	0	0
23	MF	(Croatia) Petar Brlek	4	0	0	3	0	0	0	0	0	7	0	0
24	FW	(Croatia) Filip Živković	1	0	0	0	0	0	0	0	0	1	0	0
28	DF	(Croatia) Slavko Bralić	5	0	1	0	0	0	1	0	0	6	0	1
31	GK	(Croatia) Marko Malenica	1	0	0	2	0	0	0	0	0	3	0	0
34	FW	(Croatia) Anton Matković	2	0	0	0	0	0	0	0	0	2	0	0
36	MF	(Bosnia and Herzegovina) Nail Omerović	5	0	0	0	0	0	0	0	0	5	0	0
38	GK	(Croatia) Franko Kolić	1	0	0	0	0	0	0	0	0	1	0	0
39	FW	(Croatia) Domagoj Bukvić	4	0	0	2	0	0	0	0	0	6	0	0
41	DF	(Greece) Stefanos Evangelou	2	0	0	1	0	0	0	0	0	3	0	0
42	DF	(Brazil) Renan Guedes	3	0	0	0	0	0	1	0	0	4	0	0
44	FW	(Croatia) Kristijan Lovrić	6	0	0	2	0	0	0	0	0	8	0	0
55	DF	(Ukraine) Oleksandr Drambayev	1	0	0	0	0	0	1	0	0	2	0	0
66	MF	(Switzerland) Petar Pušić	7	0	0	0	0	0	1	0	0	8	0	0
79	MF	(Bosnia and Herzegovina) Amer Hiroš	2	0	0	0	0	0	0	0	0	2	0	0
TOTALS			79	0	2	13	0	0	6	0	0	98	0	2

=== Appearances and goals ===
Number	Position	Player	Apps	Goals	Apps	Goals	Apps	Goals	Apps	Goals
Number	Position	Player	Total		HNL (Note: First number represents appearances in starting eleven, while the second number indicates a substitute appearance.)		Conference League		Croatian Cup	
3	DF	(Portugal) André Duarte	32	0	29+1	0	0+0	0	1+1	0
4	DF	(North Macedonia) Jovan Manev	8	0	7+0	0	0+0	0	1+0	0
4	DF	(Croatia) Krešimir Vrbanac	5	0	0+5	0	0+0	0	0+0	0
5	DF	(Armenia) Styopa Mkrtchyan	20	1	7+7	1	4+0	0	2+0	0
6	MF	(Croatia) Darko Nejašmić	43	4	31+5	3	4+0	1	2+1	0
7	MF	(Croatia) Vedran Jugović	33	4	11+16	4	3+1	0	1+1	0
8	FW	(Croatia) Kristian Fućak	9	1	1+5	1	1+2	0	0+0	0
10	FW	(Croatia) Josip Špoljarić	3	1	0+0	0	0+3	1	0+0	0
11	MF	(Croatia) Mijo Caktaš	22	9	11+6	7	4+0	1	1+0	1
13	FW	(Argentina) Ramón Miérez	41	21	34+0	19	4+0	1	2+1	1
14	MF	(Croatia) Ivan Fiolić	15	2	4+7	2	0+3	0	1+0	0
15	GK	(Croatia) Marko Barešić	1	0	0+0	0	0+0	0	1+0	0
17	DF	(Croatia) Šime Gržan	37	2	16+14	0	4+0	2	2+1	0
18	MF	(Albania) Enis Çokaj	16	0	11+4	0	0+0	0	0+1	0
19	MF	(Ukraine) Denys Harmash	4	0	2+1	0	0+0	0	0+1	0
20	DF	(Croatia) Marin Prekodravac	21	0	11+8	0	0+0	0	1+1	0
22	DF	(Croatia) Roko Jurišić	17	1	17+0	1	0+0	0	0+0	0
23	MF	(Croatia) Petar Brlek	31	1	16+10	1	4+0	0	1+0	0
24	FW	(Croatia) Filip Živković	8	0	0+7	0	0+0	0	1+0	0
25	MF	(Croatia) Luka Barić	1	0	0+0	0	0+0	0	0+1	0
26	MF	(Croatia) Ante Barišić	1	0	0+1	0	0+0	0	0+0	0
28	DF	(Croatia) Slavko Bralić	28	2	24+2	1	0+0	0	2+0	1
31	GK	(Croatia) Marko Malenica	34	0	28+0	0	4+0	0	2+0	0
32	FW	(Croatia) Andrej Mićić	1	0	0+1	0	0+0	0	0+0	0
34	FW	(Croatia) Anton Matković	19	5	9+9	5	0+0	0	0+1	0
35	DF	(Croatia) Luka Zebec	6	0	0+4	0	0+0	0	1+1	0
36	MF	(Bosnia and Herzegovina) Nail Omerović	31	1	18+9	1	0+1	0	2+1	0
37	DF	(Bosnia and Herzegovina) Adrian Leon Barišić	3	0	1+0	0	2+0	0	0+0	0
38	GK	(Croatia) Franko Kolić	8	0	8+0	0	0+0	0	0+0	0
39	FW	(Croatia) Domagoj Bukvić	40	4	30+5	4	1+2	0	2+0	0
41	DF	(Greece) Stefanos Evangelou	6	0	4+0	0	1+1	0	0+0	0
41	FW	(Bosnia and Herzegovina) Amar Zahirović	2	0	0+2	0	0+0	0	0+0	0
42	DF	(Brazil) Renan Guedes	25	0	14+8	0	1+1	0	0+1	0
44	FW	(Croatia) Kristijan Lovrić	30	9	14+11	7	2+1	0	2+0	2
55	DF	(Ukraine) Oleksandr Drambayev	20	0	12+4	0	3+0	0	1+0	0
66	MF	(Switzerland) Petar Pušić	39	3	25+7	3	2+2	0	3+0	0
79	MF	(Bosnia and Herzegovina) Amer Hiroš	8	0	0+5	0	0+2	0	0+1	0
98	MF	(Croatia) Šimun Mikolčić	2	0	0+2	0	0+0	0	0+0	0
99	FW	(Slovakia) Ladislav Almási	10	1	1+8	1	0+0	0	1+0	0
