= 2023–24 NK Istra 1961 season =

NK Istra 1961
2023–24 season
- Owner: Baskonia - Alavés Group
- Manager: Gonzalo García (until 7 June 2023); Mislav Karoglan (11 June 2023 - 9 August 2023); David Català (14 August 2023 - 7 February 2024); Paolo Tramezzani (since 8 February 2024)
- Stadium: Stadion Aldo Drosina
- HNL: 8th
- Croatian Cup: Second Round
- Top goalscorer: League: Ante Erceg (6); All: Ante Erceg (6)
- Highest home attendance: 8,606 v Hajduk Split (26 November 2023)
- Lowest home attendance: 802 v Varaždin (1 December 2023)
- Average home league attendance: 2,603

The 2023–24 NK Istra 1961 season was the club's 63rd season in existence and the 15th consecutive season in the top flight of Croatian football.

== First-team squad ==
As of 27 March 2024

Note: Flags indicate national team as defined under FIFA eligibility rules; some limited exceptions apply. Players may hold more than one non-FIFA nationality.

No.	Pos.	Nation	Player
1	GK	CRO	Marijan Ćorić
2	DF	CRO	Luka Hujber
4	MF	CRO	Frano Mlinar (vice-captain)
5	DF	FIN	Ville Koski
7	MF	CRO	Slavko Blagojević (captain)
8	MF	CRO	Mario Čuić
9	FW	BIH	Hamza Jaganjac (on loan from Adana Demirspor)
11	FW	CRO	Mateo Lisica
13	DF	AUT	Dario Marešić
14	FW	SWE	Emmanuel Ekong (on loan from Empoli)
15	FW	VEN	Darwin Matheus
16	MF	UKR	Oleksandr Petrusenko
17	DF	NED	Terrence Douglas
20	DF	MDA	Iurie Iovu

No.	Pos.	Nation	Player
21	GK	CRO	Lovro Majkić
22	MF	CRO	Matej Vuk
23	DF	CRO	Moris Valinčić
27	MF	CRO	Ivan Ćalušić
31	MF	CRO	Dukan Ahmeti
34	DF	SRB	Mladen Devetak (on loan from Palermo)
35	MF	CRO	Antonio Maurić
37	FW	CRO	Lorenzo Travaglia
40	GK	CRO	Jan Paus-Kunšt
45	DF	CRO	Ante Majstorović
70	FW	NGR	Salim Fago Lawal
75	FW	FRA	Elias Filet
97	DF	BIH	Advan Kadušić

== Transfers ==
=== In ===
Pos	Player	Transferred from	Fee	Date	Source
MF	(Slovakia) Sebastian Nebyla	(Slovakia) DAC Dunajská Streda	Free	9 June 2023	
MF	(Sint Maarten) Chovanie Amatkarijo	(Sweden) Östersunds FK	Free	12 June 2023	
DF	(Croatia) Fran Vujnović	(Croatia) Kustošija	Back from loan	15 June 2023	
MF	(Croatia) Antonio Siljan	(Croatia) Jadran Poreč	Back from loan	15 June 2023	
MF	(Croatia) Ivan Ćalušić	(Croatia) Hajduk Split	Free	19 June 2023	
MF	(Bosnia and Herzegovina) Irfan Ramić	(Bosnia and Herzegovina) Sarajevo	Free	25 June 2023	
DF	(Croatia) Mauro Perković	(Croatia) Dinamo Zagreb	Back from loan	30 June 2023	
MF	(Croatia) Mario Čuić	(Croatia) Hajduk Split	Free	5 July 2023	
DF	(Croatia) Moris Valinčić	(Bosnia and Herzegovina) Široki Brijeg	Free	7 July 2023	
GK	(Croatia) Marino Bulat	(Croatia) Varaždin	Free	10 July 2023	
DF	(Serbia) Mladen Devetak	(Italy) Palermo	Loan	13 July 2023	
DF	(Sweden) Eric Björkander	(Turkey) Altay	Free	17 July 2023	
DF	(Netherlands) Terrence Douglas	(Netherlands) Roda JC Kerkrade	Free	19 July 2023	
DF	(Austria) Dario Marešić	(France) Reims	Free	27 July 2023	
FW	(Nigeria) Salim Fago Lawal	(Nigeria) Mavlon	Undisclosed	1 August 2023	
MF	(Nigeria) Israel Isaac Ayuma	(Nigeria) Mavlon	Undisclosed	10 August 2023	
FW	(France) Elias Filet	(France) Sochaux	Free	18 August 2023	
GK	(Croatia) Jan Paus-Kunšt	(Slovenia) Triglav Kranj	Recalled from loan	30 August 2023	
FW	(Sweden) Emmanuel Ekong	(Italy) Empoli	Loan	7 September 2023	
DF	(Finland) Ville Koski	(Finland) Honka	Free	2 December 2023	
DF	(Croatia) Mihael Rovis	(Croatia) Šibenik	Recalled from loan	8 December 2023	
MF	(Croatia) Marin Žgomba	(Slovenia) Bravo	Recalled from loan	9 January 2024	
FW	(Croatia) Tomislav Glavan	(Croatia) Zrinski Osječko 1664	Recalled from loan	29 January 2024	
FW	(Bosnia and Herzegovina) Hamza Jaganjac	(Turkey) Adana Demirspor	Loan	6 February 2024	

Source: Glasilo Hrvatskog nogometnog saveza

=== Out ===
Pos	Player	Transferred to	Fee	Date	Source
MF	(Spain) Einar Galilea	(Spain) Málaga	Free	31 May 2023	
DF	(Austria) Dario Marešić	(France) Reims	Back from loan	1 June 2023	
MF	(Netherlands) Reda Boultam	(Italy) Salernitana	Back from loan	1 June 2023	
MF	(Mauritania) Abdallahi Mahmoud	(Spain) Deportivo Alavés	Back from loan	1 June 2023	
DF	(Croatia) Luka Marin	(Bosnia and Herzegovina) Zrinjski Mostar	Free	6 June 2023	
MF	(Croatia) Kristijan Kopljar	No team	Free	6 June 2023	
MF	(Argentina) Facundo Cáseres	(Argentina) Vélez Sarsfield	Back from loan	15 June 2023	
MF	(Croatia) Lovre Knežević	No team	Free	16 June 2023	
MF	(Spain) Unai Naveira	(Spain) Athletic Bilbao B	Back from loan	30 June 2023	
DF	(Croatia) Mauro Perković	(Croatia) Dinamo Zagreb	€2,000,000	1 July 2023	
FW	(Algeria) Monsef Bakrar	(United States) New York City FC	€1,800,000	11 July 2023	
GK	(Croatia) Jan Paus-Kunšt	(Slovenia) Triglav Kranj	Loan	21 July 2023	
MF	(Croatia) Tomislav Duvnjak	(Croatia) Sesvete	Loan	3 August 2023	
FW	(Croatia) Tomislav Glavan	(Croatia) Zrinski Osječko 1664	Loan	3 August 2023	
FW	(Croatia) Lorenzo Travaglia	(Croatia) Jadran Poreč	Dual registration	4 August 2023	
DF	(Croatia) Luka Bradarić	(Croatia) Dugopolje	Loan	7 August 2023	
MF	(Croatia) Antonio Siljan	(Croatia) Jadran Poreč	Free	7 August 2023	
MF	(Croatia) Marin Žgomba	(Slovenia) Bravo	Loan	11 August 2023	
DF	(Croatia) Fran Vujnović	(Croatia) Trnje	Free	16 August 2023	
GK	(Croatia) Carlo Jurak	(Croatia) Uljanik	Loan	25 August 2023	
DF	(Croatia) Mihael Rovis	(Croatia) Šibenik	Loan	25 August 2023	
MF	(Sint Maarten) Chovanie Amatkarijo	(Sweden) GAIS	Undisclosed	30 August 2023	
DF	(Sweden) Eric Björkander	(Sweden) IF Brommapojkarna	Free	19 December 2023	
FW	(Switzerland) Zoran Josipovic	No team	Free	12 January 2024	
DF	(Croatia) Mihael Rovis	(Slovakia) Šamorín	Free	23 January 2024	
MF	(Slovakia) Sebastian Nebyla	(Czech Republic) Jablonec	Loan	28 January 2024	
GK	(Croatia) Marino Bulat	(Croatia) Jadran Poreč	Dual registration	13 February 2024	
MF	(Bosnia and Herzegovina) Irfan Ramić	(Croatia) Jadran Poreč	Dual registration	13 February 2024	
FW	(Croatia) Tomislav Glavan	(Croatia) Jadran Poreč	Dual registration	13 February 2024	
FW	(Croatia) Ante Erceg	No team	Free	27 March 2024	

Source: Glasilo Hrvatskog nogometnog saveza

Total spending: ▼€0

Total income: ▲€3,800,000

Total expenditure: ▲€3,800,000

== Competitions ==
=== Overview ===
Competition	First match	Last match	Starting round	Final position	Record							
Competition	First match	Last match	Starting round	Final position	Pld	W	D	L	GF	GA	GD	Win %
SuperSport HNL	23 July 2023	24 May 2024	Matchday 1	8th	36	10	11	15	36	54	−18	27.78
Croatian Cup	27 September 2023	5 December 2023	First round	Second round	2	1	0	1	4	3	+1	50.00
Total					38	11	11	16	40	57	−17	28.95

Last updated: 25 May 2024
Source: Soccerway

=== SuperSport HNL ===
==== League table ====
Pos	Team	Pld	W	D	L	GF	GA	GD	Pts	Qualification or relegation
6	Varaždin	36	10	12	14	39	47	−8	42	
7	Gorica	36	11	8	17	35	50	−15	41	
8	Istra 1961	36	10	11	15	36	54	−18	41	
9	Slaven Belupo	36	9	6	21	43	69	−26	33	
10	Rudeš (R)	36	1	6	29	22	85	−63	9	Relegation to First Football League

Source: SuperSport HNL
Rules for classification: 1) Points; 2) Head-to-head points; 3) Head-to-head goal difference; 4) Head-to-head goals scored (at home if two teams tied); 5) Goal difference; 6) Goals scored; 7) Play-off
(Note: Criteria 2-4 and 7 is only used if deciding champion, teams to international competition or teams for relegation and in that case criteria 6 will not be used).
(R) Relegated

==== Results summary ====
Overall								Home						Away					
Pld	W	D	L	GF	GA	GD	Pts	W	D	L	GF	GA	GD	W	D	L	GF	GA	GD
36	10	11	15	36	54	−18	41	6	6	6	18	20	−2	4	5	9	18	34	−16

Last updated: 25 May 2024.
Source: SuperSport HNL

==== Results by round ====
Round	1	2	3	4	5	6	7	8	9	10	11	12	13	14	15	16	17	18	19	20	21	22	23	24	25	26	27	28	29	30	31	32	33	34	35	36
Ground	A	H	A	H	A	H	A	A	H	H	A	H	A	H	A	H	H	A	A	H	A	H	A	H	A	A	H	A	A	H	A	H	A	H	H	A
Result	D	L	L	D	D	D	W	L	L	L	L	D	L	W	W	L	W	D	L	L	L	W	D	W	L	D	D	D	L	L	W	W	W	D	W	L
Position	5	8	9	9	9	9	8	8	8	9	9	9	9	9	8	9	8	9	9	9	9	9	9	9	9	9	9	8	8	9	8	8	7	8	7	8

Updated to match(es) played on 25 May 2024. Source: SuperSport HNL
A = Away; H = Home; W = Win; D = Draw; L = Loss

==== Matches ====
23 July 2023 1	Lokomotiva	1–1	Istra 1961	Zagreb
21:00 CEST (UTC+02:00)	Bubanja 69'; Mersinaj (yellow card) 74'; Milićević (yellow card) 75'	Report	Erceg 12'	Stadium: Stadion Kranjčevićeva; Attendance: 704; Referee: Ante Terzić

29 July 2023 2	Istra 1961	0–3	Dinamo Zagreb	Pula
21:00 CEST (UTC+02:00)	Vuk (yellow card) 60'	Report	Ivanušec 6'; Emreli 57'; Ljubičić 69'	Stadium: Stadion Aldo Drosina; Attendance: 5,322; Referee: Duje Strukan

6 August 2023 3	Rijeka	6–0	Istra 1961	Rijeka
21:00 CEST (UTC+02:00)	Ivanović 34'; Selahi 44'; Pašalić 45+1'; Goda 59'; Smolčić (yellow card) 60'; Majstorović 61' (o.g.); Grgić 81'	Report	Nebyla (yellow card) 45+1'; Ćalušić (yellow card) 46'; Petrusenko (yellow card) 46'	Stadium: Stadion Rujevica; Attendance: 4,856; Referee: Dario Bel

13 August 2023 4	Istra 1961	4–4	Osijek	Pula
18:55 CEST (UTC+02:00)	Erceg (yellow card) 11'; Majstorović 28'; Nebyla 50'; Guedes 84' (o.g.); Mkrtchyan 90+1' (o.g.); Ćorić (yellow card) 90+7'	Report	Mkrtchyan 22'; Fiolić (yellow card) 39'; Evangelou (yellow card) 43'; Caktaš 48' (yellow card) 76'; Lovrić 58' (pen.); Nejašmić 60'; Hiroš (yellow card) 90+6'	Stadium: Stadion Aldo Drosina; Attendance: 2,133; Referee: Igor Pajač

19 August 2023 5	Slaven Belupo	2–2	Istra 1961	Koprivnica
18:30 CEST (UTC+02:00)	Mioč 12'; Crnac 23' (yellow card) 90'; Bosec (yellow card) 63'; Hoxha (yellow card) 74'	Report	Vuk 38'; Erceg (yellow card) 55' (goal) 84'; Majstorović (yellow card) 58'; Blagojević (yellow card) 78'; Marešić (yellow card) 87'; Nebyla (yellow card) 89'	Stadium: Gradski stadion Attendance: 547; Referee: Duje Strukan

27 August 2023 6	Istra 1961	0–0	Rudeš	Pula
18:30 CEST (UTC+02:00)	Hujber (yellow card) 50'; Devetak (yellow card) 75'	Report	Latković (yellow card) 45+1'; Lazarov (yellow card) 71'; Kralj (yellow card) 90+2'	Stadium: Stadion Aldo Drosina; Attendance: 1,579; Referee: Mario Zebec

2 September 2023 7	Hajduk Split	0–1	Istra 1961	Split
21:05 CEST (UTC+02:00)	Dolček (yellow card) 84'; Šarlija (yellow card) 90'	Report	Mlinar (yellow card) 68'; Erceg (yellow card) 78'; Lisica 90+12'; Valinčić (yellow card) 90+13'	Stadium: Stadion Poljud; Attendance: 24,893; Referee: Igor Pajač

17 September 2023 8	Varaždin	1–0	Istra 1961	Varaždin
19:15 CEST (UTC+02:00)	Jelenić (yellow card) 1'; Postonjski 74' (pen.) (yellow card) 90+5'	Report	Josipovic (yellow card) 20'; Marešić (yellow card) 44'; Blagojević (yellow card) 53'	Stadium: Stadion Varteks; Attendance: 1,905; Referee: Ante Terzić

23 September 2023 9	Istra 1961	0–1	Gorica	Pula
17:00 CEST (UTC+02:00)	Hujber (yellow card) 8'; Marešić (yellow card) 79'; Petrusenko (yellow card) 90+5'	Report	V. Majstorović 36'; Ndockyt (yellow card) 54'; Jurić (yellow card) 78'	Stadium: Stadion Aldo Drosina; Attendance: 1,081; Referee: Fran Jović

2 October 2023 10	Istra 1961	0–4	Lokomotiva	Pula
18:00 CEST (UTC+02:00)	Kadušić (yellow card) 79'; Josipovic (yellow card) 86'	Report	Šotiček 22', 90+2'; Mudražija 30'; Kanižaj (yellow card) 82'; Tuci 83'	Stadium: Stadion Aldo Drosina; Attendance: 1,197; Referee: Mateo Erceg

8 October 2023 11	Dinamo Zagreb	3–0	Istra 1961	Zagreb
17:15 CEST (UTC+02:00)	Bernauer 15'; Perković (yellow card) 39' (goal) 67'; Bulat 60'	Report	Marešić (yellow card) 5'; Valinčić (yellow card) 19'; Erceg (yellow card) 23'; Petrusenko (yellow card) 43'; Devetak (yellow card) 66'	Stadium: Stadion Maksimir; Attendance: 5,037; Referee: Dario Bel

22 October 2023 12	Istra 1961	1–1	Rijeka	Pula
15:00 CEST (UTC+02:00)	Hujber (yellow card) 20'; Marešić (yellow card) 38'; Mlinar 49' (yellow card) 90'; Douglas (yellow card) 90+6'	Report	Janković 21'; Fruk (yellow card) 74'	Stadium: Stadion Aldo Drosina; Attendance: 3,665; Referee: Ante Čulina

28 October 2023 13	Osijek	3–1	Istra 1961	Osijek
18:10 CEST (UTC+02:00)	Jugović 47', 68', 90+4' (pen.)	Report	Devetak (yellow card) 37'; Petrusenko (yellow card) 74'; Douglas (yellow card) 90+1'; Filet 90+5'	Stadium: Opus Arena; Attendance: 6,928; Referee: Jakov Titlić

5 November 2023 14	Istra 1961	2–0	Slaven Belupo	Pula
17:10 CET (UTC+01:00)	Mlinar 8'; Majstorović (red card) 40'; Blagojević (yellow card) 59'; Erceg 90'	Report	Agbekpornu (yellow card) 45+1'; Lepinjica (yellow card) 67'; Mioč (yellow card) 82'	Stadium: Stadion Aldo Drosina; Attendance: 1,096; Referee: Mario Zebec

11 November 2023 15	Rudeš	0–4	Istra 1961	Zagreb
16:00 CET (UTC+01:00)		Report	Maurić 14'; Erceg 26', 45+3' (pen.); Vuk 57'	Stadium: Stadion Kranjčevićeva; Attendance: 247; Referee: Jakov Titlić

26 November 2023 16	Istra 1961	0–2	Hajduk Split	Pula
15:00 CET (UTC+01:00)	Erceg (yellow card) 39'; Vuk (yellow card) 54'; Kadušić (yellow card) 55'; Devetak (yellow card) 90+2'	Report	Sahiti 16'; Livaja (yellow card) 28' (goal) 90' (pen.); Kalik (yellow card) 90+3'	Stadium: Stadion Aldo Drosina; Attendance: 8,606; Referee: Ante Čulina

1 December 2023 17	Istra 1961	2–0	Varaždin	Pula
17:00 CET (UTC+01:00)	Matheus (yellow card) 19' (goal) 45+4'; Vuk 67'	Report	Marina (yellow card) 14'; Postonjski (yellow card) 38'; Banovec (yellow card) 42'	Stadium: Stadion Aldo Drosina; Attendance: 802; Referee: Dario Kulušić

9 December 2023 18	Gorica	0–0	Istra 1961	Velika Gorica
14:50 CET (UTC+01:00)	Krizmanić (red card) 3'; Jurić (yellow card) 19'; Mrzljak (yellow card) 34'	Report	Kadušić (yellow card) 90+1'	Stadium: Stadion Radnik; Attendance: 438; Referee: Mateo Erceg

16 December 2023 19	Lokomotiva	3–0	Istra 1961	Zagreb
14:50 CET (UTC+01:00)	Goričan 43'; Krivak (yellow card) 50'; Žilinski 61'; Mudražija 90+2'	Report	Erceg (yellow card) 90+3'	Stadium: Stadion Kranjčevićeva; Attendance: 557; Referee: Duje Strukan

27 January 2024 20	Istra 1961	0–1	Dinamo Zagreb	Pula
17:00 CET (UTC+01:00)	Petrusenko (yellow card) 51'; Ekong (yellow card) 52'; Ćorić (yellow card) 90'	Report	Perković 36'; Ristovski (yellow card) 70'	Stadium: Stadion Aldo Drosina; Attendance: 3,891; Referee: Duje Strukan

4 February 2024 21	Rijeka	3–0	Istra 1961	Rijeka
15:00 CET (UTC+01:00)	Hodža 10'; Bogojević (yellow card) 17'; Janković 34' (pen.); Selahi (yellow card) 40'; Marić 74'	Report	Majkić (yellow card) 23'; Erceg (yellow card) 23'; Maurić (red card) 45'	Stadium: Stadion Rujevica; Attendance: 7,558; Referee: Ante Čulina

10 February 2024 22	Istra 1961	1–0	Osijek	Pula
15:00 CET (UTC+01:00)	Kadušić (yellow card) 27'; Erceg (yellow card) 32'; Ekong 43'; Čuić (yellow card) 64'	Report	Malenica (yellow card) 43'; Jugović (yellow card) 90+10'	Stadium: Stadion Aldo Drosina; Attendance: 1,019; Referee: Patrik Kolarić

16 February 2024 23	Slaven Belupo	2–2	Istra 1961	Koprivnica
17:00 CET (UTC+01:00)	Lepinjica 54' (yellow card) 79'; Štrkalj (yellow card) 57'; Pllana (yellow card) 80'	Report	Marešić 38' (yellow card) 61'; Kadušić (yellow card) 64'	Stadium: Gradski stadion Attendance: 513; Referee: Mateo Erceg

24 February 2024 24	Istra 1961	2–1	Rudeš	Pula
17:10 CET (UTC+01:00)	Čuić (yellow card) 18' (yellow-red card) 45' (goal) 22'; Ekong (yellow card) 32'; Erceg 78' (yellow card) 90+5'; Maurić (yellow card) 90+1'; Majstorović (yellow card) 90+5'	Report	Karačić 6' (yellow card) 61'; Doležal (yellow card) 43'; Marković (yellow card) 90+5'; Pavlović (yellow card) 90+5'	Stadium: Stadion Aldo Drosina; Attendance: 927; Referee: Mario Zebec

2 March 2024 25	Hajduk Split	1–0	Istra 1961	Split
17:10 CET (UTC+01:00)	Krovinović 48'; Sigur (yellow card) 82'; Pukštas (yellow card) 90+7'	Report	Kadušić (yellow card) 25'; Blagojević (yellow card) 84' (yellow-red card) 84'; Erceg (yellow card) 84'	Stadium: Stadion Poljud; Attendance: 18,267; Referee: Zdenko Lovrić

8 March 2024 26	Varaždin	2–2	Istra 1961	Varaždin
17:00 CET (UTC+01:00)	Mitrovski 16' (yellow card) 41'; Dabro 31'; Poldrugač (yellow card) 90+3'	Report	Hujber (yellow card) 30'; Valinčić 44'; Marešić (yellow card) 77'; M. Vuk 83' (pen.)	Stadium: Stadion Varteks; Attendance: 1,262; Referee: Toni Dadić

17 March 2024 27	Istra 1961	0–0	Gorica	Pula
15:00 CET (UTC+01:00)		Report	Mitrović (yellow card) 26'; Jurić (yellow card) 69'; Mrzljak (yellow card) 79'	Stadium: Stadion Aldo Drosina; Attendance: 1,283; Referee: Ante Terzić

29 March 2024 28	Istra 1961	0–0	Lokomotiva	Pula
15:50 CET (UTC+01:00)	Kadušić (yellow card) 13'; Majstorović (yellow card) 22'; Petrusenko (yellow card) 61'; Blagojević (yellow card) 84'; Devetak (yellow card) 86'	Report	Goričan (yellow card) 40'; Mersinaj (yellow card) 77'; Mudražija (yellow card) 84'	Stadium: Stadion Aldo Drosina; Attendance: 1,014; Referee: Zdenko Lovrić

7 April 2024 29	Dinamo Zagreb	4–1	Istra 1961	Zagreb
17:00 CEST (UTC+02:00)	Vidović 3'; Brodić 44', 58'; Špikić 61'	Report	Kadušić (yellow card) 15'; Filet 37'; Valinčić (yellow card) 50'; Marešić (yellow card) 79'; Ćalušić (yellow card) 90+3'	Stadium: Stadion Maksimir; Attendance: 9,270; Referee: Igor Pajač

14 April 2024 30	Istra 1961	0–2	Rijeka	Pula
19:00 CEST (UTC+02:00)	Blagojević (yellow card) 50'; Majkić (yellow card) 90+5'	Report	Fruk 30'; Selahi (yellow card) 35'; Pjaca (yellow card) 52'; Goda 84'	Stadium: Stadion Aldo Drosina; Attendance: 5,228; Referee: Dario Bel

20 April 2024 31	Osijek	1–2	Istra 1961	Osijek
17:00 CEST (UTC+02:00)	Miérez 14'; Bralić (red card) 37'; Lovrić (yellow card) 45'	Report	Vuk 39' (yellow card) 63'; Valinčić (yellow card) 42'; Filet (yellow card) 45+4'; Ekong 51'; Petrusenko (yellow card) 84'	Stadium: Opus Arena; Attendance: 5,782; Referee: Ante Čulina

26 April 2024 32	Istra 1961	3–0	Slaven Belupo	Pula
18:00 CEST (UTC+02:00)	Filet 6' (pen.); Ekong 15'; Petrusenko (yellow card) 28'; Lawal 34' (yellow card) 54'; Marešić (yellow card) 69'; Žgomba (yellow card) 90'	Report	Štrkalj (yellow card) 48'	Stadium: Stadion Aldo Drosina; Attendance: 971; Referee: Tihomir Pejin

3 May 2024 33	Rudeš	1–3	Istra 1961	Zagreb
17:00 CEST (UTC+02:00)	Mašala 19'; Mrčela (yellow card) 70'	Report	Lawal 16'; Hujber (yellow card) 23'; Iovu (yellow card) 50'; Čuić 73'; Lisica 75'	Stadium: ŠC Rudeš; Attendance: 250; Referee: Mario Zebec

12 May 2024 34	Istra 1961	1–1	Hajduk Split	Pula
19:10 CEST (UTC+02:00)	Lawal 4'; Blagojević (yellow card) 37'; Majstorović (yellow card) 45+4'; Ćalušić (yellow card) 53'	Report	Perišić 42'; Moufi (yellow card) 45+4'; Sigur (yellow card) 71'; F. Čuić (yellow card) 79'	Stadium: Stadion Aldo Drosina; Attendance: 5,993; Referee: Ante Čulina

17 May 2024 35	Istra 1961	2–0	Varaždin	Pula
18:00 CEST (UTC+02:00)	Lisica 47'; Marešić (yellow card) 54'; Jaganjac 62'; Čuić (yellow card) 69'; Blagojević (yellow card) 90'	Report	Marina (yellow card) 40'; Nekić (yellow card) 76'	Stadium: Stadion Aldo Drosina; Attendance: 1,053; Referee: Ante Terzić

24 May 2024 36	Gorica	2–0	Istra 1961	Velika Gorica
18:00 CEST (UTC+02:00)	Jurić (yellow card) 29'; Mrzljak (yellow card) 61'; Pršir 75'; Soldo 90+5'	Report	Iovu (yellow card) 22'; Čuić (yellow card) 38' (yellow-red card) 66'; Jaganjac (yellow card) 84'	Stadium: Stadion Radnik; Attendance: 461; Referee: Mateo Erceg

=== Croatian Football Cup ===
27 September 2023 R1	Zagora Unešić	0–2	Istra 1961	Unešić
15:30 CEST (UTC+02:00)		Report	Nebyla 45+1'; Blagojević (yellow card) 60'; Ekong (yellow card) 73'; Filet 75'	Stadium: Borovište; Attendance: 1,000; Referee: Jakov Titlić

5 December 2023 R2	Varaždin	3–2	Istra 1961	Varaždin
16:00 CET (UTC+01:00)	Pilj 8'; Postonjski 70' (pen.); Šego 80'; Mitrovski (yellow card) 86'; Silić (yellow card) 90+3'	Report	Josipovic 35'; Valinčić (yellow card) 39'; Filet 55' (yellow card) 61'	Stadium: Stadion Varteks; Attendance: 643; Referee: Zdenko Lovrić

== Player seasonal records ==
Updated 25 May 2024

=== Goals ===
Rank	Name	League	Cup	Total
1	(Croatia) Ante Erceg	6	–	6
2	(Croatia) Matej Vuk	5	–	5
2	(France) Elias Filet	3	2	5
4	(Sweden) Emmanuel Ekong	3	–	3
4	(Nigeria) Salim Fago Lawal	3	–	3
4	(Croatia) Mateo Lisica	3	–	3
7	(Croatia) Mario Čuić	2	–	2
7	(Croatia) Frano Mlinar	2	–	2
7	(Slovakia) Sebastian Nebyla	1	1	2
10	(Bosnia and Herzegovina) Hamza Jaganjac	1	–	1
10	(Croatia) Ante Majstorović	1	–	1
10	(Austria) Dario Marešić	1	–	1
10	(Venezuela) Darwin Matheus	1	–	1
10	(Croatia) Antonio Maurić	1	–	1
10	(Croatia) Moris Valinčić	1	–	1
10	(Switzerland) Zoran Josipovic	–	1	1
Own goals		2	–	2
TOTALS		36	4	40

Source: Competitive matches

=== Clean sheets ===
Rank	Name	League	Cup	Total
1	(Croatia) Lovro Majkić	10	–	10
2	(Croatia) Marijan Ćorić	1	–	1
2	(Croatia) Jan Paus-Kunšt	–	1	1
TOTALS		11	1	12

Source: Competitive matches

=== Disciplinary record ===
Number	Position	Player	HNL			Croatian Cup			Total		
Number	Position	Player	Yellow card	(yellow card) (yellow-red card)	Red card	Yellow card	(yellow card) (yellow-red card)	Red card	Yellow card	(yellow card) (yellow-red card)	Red card
1	GK	(Croatia) Marijan Ćorić	2	0	0	0	0	0	2	0	0
2	DF	(Croatia) Luka Hujber	5	0	0	0	0	0	5	0	0
4	MF	(Croatia) Frano Mlinar	2	0	0	0	0	0	2	0	0
7	MF	(Croatia) Slavko Blagojević	8	1	0	1	0	0	9	1	0
8	MF	(Croatia) Mario Čuić	2	2	0	0	0	0	2	2	0
9	FW	(Bosnia and Herzegovina) Hamza Jaganjac	1	0	0	0	0	0	1	0	0
9	FW	(Switzerland) Zoran Josipovic	2	0	0	0	0	0	2	0	0
13	DF	(Austria) Dario Marešić	10	0	0	0	0	0	10	0	0
14	FW	(Sweden) Emmanuel Ekong	2	0	0	1	0	0	3	0	0
15	FW	(Venezuela) Darwin Matheus	1	0	0	0	0	0	1	0	0
16	MF	(Ukraine) Oleksandr Petrusenko	8	0	0	0	0	0	8	0	0
17	DF	(Netherlands) Terrence Douglas	2	0	0	0	0	0	2	0	0
20	DF	(Moldova) Iurie Iovu	2	0	0	0	0	0	2	0	0
21	GK	(Croatia) Lovro Majkić	2	0	0	0	0	0	2	0	0
22	MF	(Croatia) Matej Vuk	3	0	0	0	0	0	3	0	0
23	DF	(Croatia) Moris Valinčić	4	0	0	1	0	0	5	0	0
27	MF	(Croatia) Ivan Ćalušić	3	0	0	0	0	0	3	0	0
34	DF	(Serbia) Mladen Devetak	5	0	0	0	0	0	5	0	0
35	DF	(Croatia) Antonio Maurić	1	0	1	0	0	0	1	0	1
36	MF	(Croatia) Marin Žgomba	1	0	0	0	0	0	1	0	0
45	DF	(Croatia) Ante Majstorović	4	0	1	0	0	0	4	0	1
50	FW	(Croatia) Ante Erceg	10	0	0	0	0	0	10	0	0
70	FW	(Nigeria) Salim Fago Lawal	1	0	0	0	0	0	1	0	0
75	FW	(France) Elias Filet	1	0	0	1	0	0	2	0	0
77	MF	(Slovakia) Sebastian Nebyla	2	0	0	0	0	0	2	0	0
97	DF	(Bosnia and Herzegovina) Advan Kadušić	8	0	0	0	0	0	8	0	0
TOTALS			92	3	2	4	0	0	96	3	2

=== Appearances and goals ===
Number	Position	Player	Apps	Goals	Apps	Goals	Apps	Goals
Number	Position	Player	Total		HNL (Note: First number represents appearances in starting eleven, while the second number indicates a substitute appearance.)		Croatian Cup	
1	GK	(Croatia) Marijan Ćorić	2	0	2+0	0	0+0	0
2	DF	(Croatia) Luka Hujber	24	0	15+8	0	1+0	0
4	MF	(Croatia) Frano Mlinar	20	2	15+4	2	0+1	0
5	DF	(Sweden) Eric Björkander	6	0	2+3	0	1+0	0
5	DF	(Finland) Ville Koski	12	0	9+3	0	0+0	0
7	MF	(Croatia) Slavko Blagojević	28	0	21+6	0	1+0	0
8	MF	(Croatia) Mario Čuić	32	2	14+16	2	1+1	0
9	FW	(Bosnia and Herzegovina) Hamza Jaganjac	5	1	0+5	1	0+0	0
9	FW	(Switzerland) Zoran Josipovic	9	1	1+6	0	1+1	1
10	MF	(Sint Maarten) Chovanie Amatkarijo	2	0	1+1	0	0+0	0
11	MF	(Croatia) Mateo Lisica	27	3	9+17	3	1+0	0
13	DF	(Austria) Dario Marešić	33	1	30+1	1	2+0	0
14	FW	(Sweden) Emmanuel Ekong	22	3	13+8	3	1+0	0
15	FW	(Venezuela) Darwin Matheus	17	1	4+12	1	0+1	0
16	MF	(Ukraine) Oleksandr Petrusenko	30	0	23+6	0	1+0	0
17	DF	(Netherlands) Terrence Douglas	14	0	5+8	0	1+0	0
20	DF	(Moldova) Iurie Iovu	13	0	9+2	0	1+1	0
21	GK	(Croatia) Lovro Majkić	34	0	34+0	0	0+0	0
22	MF	(Croatia) Matej Vuk	30	5	21+7	5	1+1	0
23	DF	(Croatia) Moris Valinčić	24	1	17+6	1	1+0	0
27	MF	(Croatia) Ivan Ćalušić	18	0	10+7	0	1+0	0
31	MF	(Croatia) Dukan Ahmeti	1	0	0+1	0	0+0	0
34	DF	(Serbia) Mladen Devetak	31	0	29+1	0	0+1	0
35	DF	(Croatia) Antonio Maurić	20	1	14+6	1	0+0	0
36	MF	(Croatia) Marin Žgomba	2	0	0+2	0	0+0	0
37	FW	(Croatia) Lorenzo Travaglia	1	0	1+0	0	0+0	0
40	GK	(Croatia) Jan Paus-Kunšt	2	0	0+0	0	2+0	0
45	DF	(Croatia) Ante Majstorović	32	1	32+0	1	0+0	0
50	FW	(Croatia) Ante Erceg	22	6	19+2	6	0+1	0
70	FW	(Nigeria) Salim Fago Lawal	14	3	7+5	3	0+2	0
75	FW	(France) Elias Filet	22	5	14+6	3	2+0	2
77	MF	(Slovakia) Sebastian Nebyla	12	2	4+6	1	2+0	1
97	DF	(Bosnia and Herzegovina) Advan Kadušić	26	0	21+4	0	1+0	0
