= 2022–23 NK Osijek season =

Osijek
2022–23 season
- Owner: NK OS d.o.o.
- President: Ferenc Szakály
- Head coach: Nenad Bjelica (until 29 August 2022); René Poms (1 September 2022 - 2 March 2023); Borimir Perković (2 March 2023 - 22 April 2023); Stjepan Tomas (since 24 April 2023)
- Stadium: Gradski Vrt Stadium
- HNL: 3rd
- Croatian Cup: Quarter-finals
- UEFA Europa Conference League: Second qualifying round
- Top goalscorer: League: Ramón Miérez (12); All: Ramón Miérez (12)
- Highest home attendance: 11,522 v Rijeka (27 May 2023)
- Lowest home attendance: 1,007 v Varaždin (26 February 2023)
- Average home league attendance: 4,044
Home colours	Away colours	Third colours

The 2022–23 NK Osijek season was the club's 76th season in existence and the 32nd consecutive season in the top flight of Croatian football. This was the last season Osijek played their matches on Gradski Vrt Stadium.

== Players ==
As of 30 March 2023

Note: Flags indicate national team as defined under FIFA eligibility rules; some limited exceptions apply. Players may hold more than one non-FIFA nationality.

No.	Pos.	Nation	Player
4	DF	CRO	Marin Leovac
6	MF	CRO	Darko Nejašmić
7	MF	CRO	Vedran Jugović
8	MF	ESP	Diego Barri
10	FW	CRO	Josip Špoljarić
11	MF	CRO	Mijo Caktaš
13	FW	ARG	Ramón Miérez
14	MF	CRO	Ivan Fiolić
15	GK	CRO	Marko Barešić
16	FW	MNE	Nikola Janjić
17	FW	CRO	Šime Gržan
19	MF	CRO	Mihael Žaper
20	DF	SLO	Mario Jurčević

No.	Pos.	Nation	Player
23	MF	CRO	Petar Brlek
24	FW	CRO	Filip Živković
25	MF	MNE	Ognjen Bakić
30	FW	AUT	Mihret Topčagić
31	GK	CRO	Marko Malenica
34	DF	CRO	Ivan Cvijanović
36	MF	BIH	Nail Omerović
37	DF	BIH	Adrian Leon Barišić
39	DF	CRO	Domagoj Bukvić
40	MF	CRO	Dominik Babić
44	FW	CRO	Kristijan Lovrić
98	DF	UKR	Yevhen Cheberko

== Transfers ==
=== In ===
Pos	Player	Transferred from	Fee	Date	Source
DF	(Bosnia and Herzegovina) Adrian Leon Barišić	(Italy) Frosinone	Return from loan	15 June 2022	
DF	(Spain) José Antonio Caro	(Spain) UCAM Murcia	Return from loan	15 June 2022	
FW	(Montenegro) Nikola Janjić	(Montenegro) Sutjeska Nikšić	Free	15 June 2022	
DF	(Brazil) Talys	(Cyprus) Pafos FC	Return from loan	15 June 2022	
FW	(Croatia) Dion Drena Beljo	(Croatia) Istra 1961	Return from loan	15 June 2022	
FW	(Croatia) Šime Gržan	(Hungary) Zalaegerszeg	Return from loan	15 June 2022	
FW	(Kosovo) Mirlind Daku	(Slovenia) Mura	Return from loan	15 June 2022	
FW	(Croatia) Josip Špoljarić	(Hungary) Zalaegerszeg	Return from loan	15 June 2022	
DF	(Croatia) Luka Zebec	(Croatia) Belišće	Undisclosed	7 July 2022	
FW	(Croatia) Vinko Petković	(Croatia) Istra 1961	Recalled from loan	13 December 2022	

=== Out ===
Pos	Player	Transferred to	Fee	Date	Source
FW	(Kosovo) Mirlind Daku	(Slovenia) Mura	Loan	20 June 2022	
FW	(Slovenia) Damjan Bohar	(Poland) Zagłębie Lubin	€250,000	21 June 2022	
FW	(Croatia) Vinko Petković	(Croatia) Istra 1961	Loan	5 July 2022	
DF	(Brazil) Talys	(Croatia) Slaven Belupo	Released	18 July 2022	
DF	(Spain) José Antonio Caro	(Spain) Linares	Released	22 July 2022	
MF	(Republic of the Congo) Merveil Ndockyt	(Croatia) Gorica	Released	25 July 2022	
GK	(Croatia) Franko Kolić	(Croatia) Vukovar 1991	Dual registration	27 July 2022	
DF	(Croatia) Uwem Alexander	(Croatia) Vukovar 1991	Dual registration	27 July 2022	
DF	(Croatia) Luka Zebec	(Croatia) Vukovar 1991	Dual registration	27 July 2022	
DF	(Croatia) Alen Grgić	(Croatia) Rijeka	Free	26 August 2022	
DF	(Croatia) Mato Miloš	(Poland) Widzew Łódź	Undisclosed	26 August 2022	
DF	(Croatia) Slavko Bralić	(Croatia) Gorica	Loan	13 December 2022	
FW	(Croatia) Kristian Fućak	(Croatia) Gorica	Loan	13 December 2022	
FW	(Croatia) Vinko Petković	(Croatia) Gorica	Loan	13 December 2022	
MF	(Hungary) László Kleinheisler	(Greece) Panathinaikos	€500,000	12 January 2023	
FW	(Croatia) Dion Drena Beljo	(Germany) Augsburg	€3,000,000	13 January 2023	
DF	(Croatia) Karlo Bartolec	(Hungary) Puskás Akadémia	Undisclosed	23 January 2023	
FW	(Croatia) Antonio Mance	(Hungary) Debrecen	Free	23 January 2023	
MF	(Bosnia and Herzegovina) Amer Hiroš	(Croatia) Šibenik	Loan	25 January 2023	
GK	(Croatia) Ivica Ivušić	(Cyprus) Pafos	€2,000,000	26 January 2023	
DF	(Croatia) Luka Zebec	(Croatia) BSK Bijelo Brdo	Loan	3 February 2023	
DF	(Germany) Danijel Lončar	(Poland) Pogoń Szczecin	€400,000	10 February 2023	
DF	(Croatia) Uwem Alexander	(Croatia) Hrvatski Dragovoljac	Loan	16 February 2023	
DF	(Croatia) Mile Škorić	(China) Cangzhou Mighty Lions	€200,000	30 March 2023	

▼ Total Spending: €0

▲ Total Income: €6,350,000

▲ Net Income: €6,350,000

== Competitions ==
=== Overall record ===
Competition	First match	Last match	Starting round	Final position	Record							
Competition	First match	Last match	Starting round	Final position	Pld	W	D	L	GF	GA	GD	Win %
SuperSport HNL	16 July 2022	27 May 2023	Matchday 1	3rd	36	13	11	12	46	41	+5	36.11
Croatian Cup	18 October 2022	1 March 2023	First round	Quarter-finals	3	2	0	1	5	3	+2	66.67
UEFA Europa Conference League	21 July 2022	28 July 2022	Second qualifying round	Second qualifying round	2	1	0	1	2	3	−1	50.00
Total					41	16	11	14	53	47	+6	39.02

Last updated: 28 May 2023
Source: Soccerway

=== SuperSport HNL ===
==== League table ====
Pos	Team	Pld	W	D	L	GF	GA	GD	Pts	Qualification or relegation
1	Dinamo Zagreb (C)	36	24	9	3	81	28	+53	81	Qualification for the Champions League second qualifying round
2	Hajduk Split	36	21	8	7	65	41	+24	71	Qualification to Europa Conference League third qualifying round (Note: Hajduk qualified for the Europa Conference League third qualifying round by winning the 2022–23 Croatian Football Cup.)
3	Osijek	36	13	11	12	46	41	+5	50	Qualification to Europa Conference League second qualifying round
4	Rijeka	36	14	7	15	44	44	0	49	Qualification to Europa Conference League second qualifying round
5	Istra 1961	36	11	13	12	36	38	−2	46	

Source: SuperSport HNL
Rules for classification: 1) Points; 2) Head-to-head points; 3) Head-to-head goal difference; 4) Head-to-head goals scored (at home if two teams tied); 5) Goal difference; 6) Goals scored; 7) Play-off
(Note: Criteria 2-4 and 7 is only used if deciding champion, teams to international competition or teams for relegation and in that case criteria 6 will not be used).
(C) Champions

==== Results summary ====
Overall								Home						Away					
Pld	W	D	L	GF	GA	GD	Pts	W	D	L	GF	GA	GD	W	D	L	GF	GA	GD
36	13	11	12	46	41	+5	50	7	9	2	21	13	+8	6	2	10	25	28	−3

Last updated: 28 May 2023.
Source: SuperSport HNL

==== Results by round ====
Round	1	2	3	4	5	6	7	8	9	10	11	12	13	14	15	16	17	18	19	20	21	22	23	24	25	26	27	28	29	30	31	32	33	34	35	36
Ground	H	A	H	A	H	A	H	H	A	A	H	A	H	A	H	A	A	H	H	A	H	A	H	A	H	H	A	A	H	A	H	A	H	A	A	H
Result	W	L	D	L	D	L	W	D	W	W	W	W	W	L	W	L	W	D	W	L	D	L	L	D	L	D	D	L	D	L	W	W	D	L	W	D
Position	3	4	3	6	7	8	5	6	5	4	3	3	3	3	3	3	3	3	3	3	3	3	3	3	3	3	3	3	4	5	4	4	4	4	3	3

Updated to match(es) played on 28 May 2023. Source: SuperSport HNL
A = Away; H = Home; W = Win; D = Draw; L = Loss

==== Matches ====
16 July 2022 1	Osijek	2–1	Gorica	Osijek
19:00 CEST (UTC+02:00)	Nejašmić (yellow card) 33'; Beljo 62', 74' (pen.); Miérez (yellow card) 90+2'	Report	Golubickas (yellow card) 15'; Krizmanić (yellow card) 21'; Lončar 66' (o.g.); Jovičić (yellow card) 73'; Keita (yellow card) 80'; Mitrović (yellow card) 86'; Julardžija (red card) 86'; Steenvoorden (yellow card) 90+2'	Stadium: Gradski Vrt Stadium; Attendance: 3,590; Referee: Ante Čuljak

24 July 2022 2	Lokomotiva	2–1	Osijek	Zagreb
21:00 CEST (UTC+02:00)	Bubanja (yellow card) 2'; Bošković (yellow card) 75' (goal) 80', 86'; Kulenović (yellow card) 84'; Florucz (yellow card) 90+1'; Goričan (yellow card) 90+2'	Report	Kleinheisler 16'; Jurčević (yellow card) 90'; Lončar (yellow card) 90+1'	Stadium: Stadion Kranjčevićeva; Attendance: 849; Referee: Duje Strukan

31 July 2022 3	Osijek	0–0	Slaven Belupo	Osijek
18:55 CEST (UTC+02:00)	Brlek (yellow card) 68'; Škorić (yellow card) 90+3'	Report	Marina (yellow card) 5'; Bosec (yellow card) 31'; Božić (yellow card) 41'; Caimacov (yellow card) 81'; Talys (yellow card) 90+3'	Stadium: Gradski Vrt Stadium; Attendance: 2,870; Referee: Mario Zebec

6 August 2022 4	Istra 1961	1–0	Osijek	Pula
21:00 CEST (UTC+02:00)	Marin (yellow card) 52'; Mumba (yellow card) 67'; Bakrar 90+4'; Majkić (yellow card) 90+6'	Report	Jugović (yellow card) 6'; Jurčević (yellow card) 33'; Škorić (yellow card) 90+6'; Fiolić (yellow card) 90+6'	Stadium: Stadion Aldo Drosina; Attendance: 1,230; Referee: Patrik Kolarić

14 August 2022 5	Osijek	2–2	Varaždin	Osijek
18:55 CEST (UTC+02:00)	Jugović 57' (yellow card) 64'; Kleinheisler (yellow card) 73'; Beljo 77'	Report	Elezi (yellow card) 64'; Brodić 65'; Perić 84'; Urata (yellow card) 86'	Stadium: Gradski Vrt Stadium; Attendance: 3,233; Referee: Igor Pajač

20 August 2022 6	Dinamo Zagreb	5–2	Osijek	Zagreb
21:05 CEST (UTC+02:00)	Oršić 3'; Petković (yellow card) 40' (goal) 53'; Perić 66', 82'; Jurčević 90+3' (o.g.)	Report	Beljo 29'; Kleinheisler 74'	Stadium: Stadion Maksimir; Attendance: 5,168; Referee: Patrik Kolarić

28 August 2022 7	Osijek	2–1	Hajduk Split	Osijek
21:05 CEST (UTC+02:00)	Leovac 23' (yellow card) 49'; Beljo 41' (pen.); Jugović (yellow card) 88'; Brlek (yellow card) 90+7'; Mance (yellow card) 90+10'	Report	Lovrencsics (yellow card) 43'; Sahiti (yellow card) 46'; Livaja 73' (pen.); Kalik (yellow card) 76'; Mikanović (yellow card) 79'; Awaziem (yellow card) 90'	Stadium: Gradski Vrt Stadium; Attendance: 7,820; Referee: Ante Čulina

3 September 2022 8	Osijek	1–1	Šibenik	Osijek
21:05 CEST (UTC+02:00)	Kleinheisler 38'; Lončar (yellow card) 69'; Jurčević (yellow card) 82'; Barri (yellow card) 90'	Report	Perić (yellow card) 42'; Matić (yellow card) 62'; Mina (yellow card) 64'; Burgui 78'	Stadium: Gradski Vrt Stadium; Attendance: 2,944; Referee: Duje Strukan

10 September 2022 9	Rijeka	0–3	Osijek	Rijeka
18:30 CEST (UTC+02:00)	M. Pavlović (yellow card) 9'; Liber (yellow card) 55'; Vlasenko (yellow card) 70'	Report	Miérez 36' (yellow card) 37'; Caktaš 44', 63'	Stadium: Stadion Rujevica; Attendance: 3,825; Referee: Ante Čulina

17 September 2022 10	Gorica	0–1	Osijek	Velika Gorica
16:55 CEST (UTC+02:00)	Suk (yellow card) 57'; Steenvoorden (yellow card) 70'; Golubickas (yellow card) 81'; Jovičić (yellow card) 84'; Banić (yellow card) 90+3'; Raspopović (red card) 90+3'	Report	Gržan 19'; Barri (yellow card) 26'; Miérez (yellow card) 66'; Lončar (yellow card) 90+2'	Stadium: Stadion Radnik; Attendance: 492; Referee: Duje Strukan

1 October 2022 11	Osijek	4–1	Lokomotiva	Osijek
16:55 CEST (UTC+02:00)	Barišić 2' (yellow card) 69'; Beljo 3'; Caktaš 45'; Kleinheisler 80'	Report	Smakaj (yellow card) 42'; Vasilj 86'; Cipetić (yellow card) 90+1'	Stadium: Gradski Vrt Stadium; Attendance: 2,443; Referee: Jakov Titlić

9 October 2022 12	Slaven Belupo	0–4	Osijek	Koprivnica
15:00 CEST (UTC+02:00)		Report	Caktaš 5', 45+1', 52'; Kleinheisler (yellow card) 20' (goal) 35'; Leovac (yellow card) 61'	Stadium: Gradski stadion Attendance: 968; Referee: Ivan Bebek

15 October 2022 13	Osijek	2–0	Istra 1961	Osijek
16:55 CEST (UTC+02:00)	Barišić (yellow card) 8'; Žaper (yellow card) 28'; Miérez 62'; Caktaš 90+5'	Report	Rovis (yellow card) 5'; Perković (yellow card) 51'; Erceg (yellow card) 57'; Petrusenko (yellow card) 60'; Antovski (red card) 90+3'	Stadium: Gradski Vrt Stadium; Attendance: 3,524; Referee: Goran Pečarić

22 October 2022 14	Varaždin	4–1	Osijek	Varaždin
17:10 CEST (UTC+02:00)	Ba (yellow card) 13'; Posavec 32'; Elezi 35'; Ivušić 41' (o.g.); Domjanić 90+4'	Report	Kleinheisler 18'; Beljo (yellow card) 64'; Barišić (yellow card) 90+7'	Stadium: Stadion Varteks; Attendance: 1,968; Referee: Ivan Bebek

29 October 2022 15	Osijek	1–0	Dinamo Zagreb	Osijek
17:30 CEST (UTC+02:00)	Miérez 85'; Hiroš (yellow card) 90+5'	Report	Štefulj (yellow card) 12'; Lauritsen (yellow card) 15'; Ristovski (yellow card) 53'	Stadium: Gradski Vrt Stadium; Attendance: 7,609; Referee: Duje Strukan

5 November 2022 16	Hajduk Split	3–1	Osijek	Split
17:30 CET (UTC+01:00)	Sahiti 10'; Livaja (yellow card) 32' (goal) 69' (pen.); Mlakar 79'	Report	Gržan (yellow card) 5'; Bralić (yellow card) 30'; Leovac 45'	Stadium: Stadion Poljud; Attendance: 9,720; Referee: Antoniou Menelaus

13 November 2022 17	Šibenik	0–2	Osijek	Šibenik
15:00 CET (UTC+01:00)		Report	Beljo 36', 38'; Žaper (yellow card) 70'; Leovac (yellow card) 79'	Stadium: Stadion Šubićevac; Attendance: 251; Referee: Goran Pečarić

21 January 2023 18	Osijek	1–1	Rijeka	Osijek
15:00 CET (UTC+01:00)	Špoljarić 9'	Report	Frigan 38' (pen.); Vukčević (yellow card) 45+1'; Galešić (yellow card) 61'	Stadium: Gradski Vrt Stadium; Attendance: 2,082; Referee: Patrik Kolarić

29 January 2023 19	Osijek	2–0	Gorica	Osijek
15:00 CET (UTC+01:00)	Miérez 15'; Špoljarić 63'	Report	A. M. Jurić (yellow card) 36'; Majstorović (yellow card) 79'	Stadium: Gradski Vrt Stadium; Attendance: 2,012; Referee: Ivan Bebek

4 February 2023 20	Lokomotiva	1–0	Osijek	Zagreb
15:00 CET (UTC+01:00)	Bubanja 39'; Marić (yellow card) 45'; Mersinaj (yellow card) 45+1'; Čavlina (yellow card) 62'	Report	Lovrić (yellow card) 61'; Miérez (yellow card) 90+4'	Stadium: Stadion Kranjčevićeva; Attendance: 710; Referee: Duje Strukan

11 February 2023 21	Osijek	0–0	Slaven Belupo	Osijek
17:10 CET (UTC+01:00)	Jugović (yellow card) 49'	Report	Marina (yellow card) 37'; Soldo (yellow card) 66'; Kocijan (yellow card) 78'; Bosec (yellow card) 86'	Stadium: Gradski Vrt Stadium; Attendance: 2,007; Referee: Goran Pečarić

18 February 2023 22	Istra 1961	1–0	Osijek	Pula
15:00 CET (UTC+01:00)	Erceg 57' (yellow card) 61'	Report	Žaper (yellow card) 17'; Leovac (yellow card) 73'; Miérez (red card) 79'; Škorić (yellow card) 83'; Živković (yellow card) 90+10'	Stadium: Stadion Aldo Drosina; Attendance: 1,358; Referee: Ante Čuljak

26 February 2023 23	Osijek	0–1	Varaždin	Osijek
17:30 CET (UTC+01:00)	Leovac (yellow card) 61'	Report	Urata (yellow card) 7'; Drožđek 28'	Stadium: Gradski Vrt Stadium; Attendance: 1,007; Referee: Fran Jović

5 March 2023 24	Dinamo Zagreb	1–1	Osijek	Zagreb
17:30 CET (UTC+01:00)	Petković 62'; Ristovski (yellow card) 81'	Report	Jurčević (yellow card) 38'; Miérez 55'; Žaper (yellow card) 61'; Malenica (yellow card) 85'	Stadium: Stadion Maksimir; Attendance: 5,187; Referee: Duje Strukan

12 March 2023 25	Osijek	0–2	Hajduk Split	Osijek
17:30 CET (UTC+01:00)	Cheberko (yellow card) 27'; Škorić (yellow card) 86'	Report	Livaja 28' (pen.); Melnjak 35'; Benrahou (yellow card) 76'; Lučić (yellow card) 90+1'	Stadium: Gradski Vrt Stadium; Attendance: 6,107; Referee: Fran Jović

18 March 2023 26	Osijek	0–0	Šibenik	Osijek
16:00 CET (UTC+01:00)	Barišić (yellow card) 12'; Leovac (yellow card) 29'; Lovrić (yellow card) 88'	Report	Đorić (yellow card) 90'	Stadium: Gradski Vrt Stadium; Attendance: 2,321; Referee: Ante Čulina

2 April 2023 27	Rijeka	1–1	Osijek	Rijeka
15:00 CEST (UTC+02:00)	Frigan 31' (pen.); Vukčević (yellow card) 50'; Dilaver (yellow card) 90+3'	Report	Jugović (yellow card) 83'; Žaper 90+4'	Stadium: Stadion Rujevica; Attendance: 5,864; Referee: Duje Strukan

8 April 2023 28	Gorica	2–0	Osijek	Velika Gorica
15:00 CEST (UTC+02:00)	Fućak 73', 83'; Bralić (yellow card) 86'	Report	Lovrić (yellow card) 68'; Špoljarić (yellow card) 90+1'	Stadium: Stadion Radnik; Attendance: 1,349; Referee: Patrik Kolarić

15 April 2023 29	Osijek	2–2	Lokomotiva	Osijek
17:00 CEST (UTC+02:00)	Miérez 9', 86'; Jurčević (yellow card) 43'; Špoljarić (yellow card) 55'; Omerović (yellow card) 74'; Fiolić (yellow card) 74'	Report	Aliyu 22' (yellow card) 54'; Stojković (yellow card) 30'; Marić (yellow card) 38'; Kačavenda (yellow card) 75'; Kulenović 80'; Tuci (yellow card) 88'	Stadium: Gradski Vrt Stadium; Attendance: 2,454; Referee: Dario Kulušić

21 April 2023 30	Slaven Belupo	2–1	Osijek	Koprivnica
18:10 CEST (UTC+02:00)	Bosec (yellow card) 24'; Soldo (yellow card) 38'; Crnac (yellow card) 45'; Božić (yellow card) 88'; Krstanović 90+7' (pen.); Boras 90+10'	Report	Caktaš 52' (yellow card) 56'; Omerović (yellow card) 87'; Jugović (yellow card) 88'; Cheberko (yellow card) 90'	Stadium: Gradski stadion Attendance: 845; Referee: Ivan Bebek

26 April 2023 31	Osijek	1–0	Istra 1961	Osijek
15:00 CEST (UTC+02:00)	Leovac (yellow card) 36'; Fiolić (yellow card) 65'; Miérez 72'; Bukvić (yellow card) 73'	Report		Stadium: Gradski Vrt Stadium; Attendance: 1,322; Referee: Igor Pajač

30 April 2023 32	Varaždin	1–3	Osijek	Varaždin
15:00 CEST (UTC+02:00)	Kolarić (yellow card) 63'; Stanić (yellow card) 67'; Jelenić (yellow card) 74'; Brodić 77'	Report	Miérez 3', 65'; Cheberko (yellow card) 35'; Bukvić 40'; Caktaš (yellow card) 75'	Stadium: Stadion Varteks; Attendance: 1,761; Referee: Jakov Titlić

7 May 2023 33	Osijek	0–0	Dinamo Zagreb	Osijek
17:00 CEST (UTC+02:00)	Fiolić (yellow card) 41'; Leovac (yellow card) 76'; Miérez (yellow card) 86'	Report		Stadium: Gradski Vrt Stadium; Attendance: 7,923; Referee: Duje Strukan

13 May 2023 34	Hajduk Split	3–0	Osijek	Split
17:00 CEST (UTC+02:00)	Awaziem 25'; Melnjak 50'; Mlakar 62'	Report		Stadium: Stadion Poljud; Attendance: 10,009; Referee: Igor Pajač

19 May 2023 35	Šibenik	1–4	Osijek	Šibenik
18:05 CEST (UTC+02:00)	Hiroš 72' (pen.); Đorić (yellow card) 86'	Report	Mina 3' (o.g.); Fiolić (yellow card) 52'; Miérez 62', 76'; Nejašmić 80'	Stadium: Stadion Šubićevac; Attendance: 1,004; Referee: Ivan Bebek

27 May 2023 36	Osijek	1–1	Rijeka	Osijek
19:00 CEST (UTC+02:00)	Mitrović 65' (o.g.); Barišić (yellow card) 69'; Barešić (yellow card) 90+4'	Report	Veiga (yellow card) 13'; Banda 31'; Galešić (yellow card) 41' (yellow-red card) 90+4'; Mitrović (yellow card) 61'; Liber (yellow card) 90+3'	Stadium: Gradski Vrt Stadium; Attendance: 11,522; Referee: Patrik Kolarić

=== Croatian Cup ===
18 October 2022 First round	Papuk Orahovica	0–2	Osijek	Orahovica
15:00 CEST (UTC+02:00)	P. Špoljarić (yellow card) 71'; D. Podboj (yellow card) 81'	Report	Jugović 32'; Lončar (yellow card) 67'; Cheberko (yellow card) 72'; Beljo 90+2'	Stadium: Papuk; Attendance: 800; Referee: Luka Slišković

9 November 2022 Second round	Varaždin	1–2	Osijek	Varaždin
15:30 CET (UTC+01:00)	Zelenika (yellow card) 37' (yellow-red card) 90+5'; Pëllumbi (yellow card) 76' (yellow-red card) 90+5'; Brodić 90+2'; Šego (yellow card) 90+9'	Report	Caktaš 9' (yellow card) 90+7'; Beljo (yellow card) 37'; Žaper (yellow card) 52'; Kleinheisler 55'; Cheberko (red card) 65'; Barri (yellow card) 90+5'; Mance (red card) 90+5'	Stadium: Stadion Varteks; Attendance: 1,222; Referee: Igor Pajač

1 March 2023 Quarter-finals	Osijek	1–2	Hajduk Split	Osijek
18:00 CET (UTC+01:00)	Škorić (yellow card) 75'; Živković 83'	Report	Vušković 21'; Krovinović 77'	Stadium: Gradski Vrt Stadium; Attendance: 4,727; Referee: Igor Pajač

=== UEFA Europa Conference League ===
==== Second qualifying round ====
21 July 2022 First leg	Kyzylzhar (Kazakhstan)	1–2	(Croatia) Osijek	Nur-Sultan, Kazakhstan
18:00 ALMT (UTC+06:00)	Gian (yellow card) 48' (yellow-red card) 69'; Nejašmić 84' (o.g.)	Report	Topčagić 58'; Kleinheisler 76'; Bartolec (yellow card) 90+3'	Stadium: Astana Arena; Attendance: 1,458; Referee: Aleksandrs Anufrijevs (Latvia)

28 July 2022 Second leg	Osijek (Croatia)	0–2 (2–3 agg.)	(Kazakhstan) Kyzylzhar	Osijek, Croatia
20:30 CEST (UTC+02:00)	Jurčević (yellow card) 85'	Report	Ivaniadze 62'; Koné 71'; Lobantsev (yellow card) 83'; Murachyov (yellow card) 87'	Stadium: Gradski Vrt Stadium; Attendance: 5,107; Referee: Anastasios Papapetrou (Greece)

=== Friendlies ===
==== Pre-season ====
18 June 2022 Friendly	Osijek	1–0	Slaven Belupo	Osijek
11:00 CEST (UTC+02:00)	Brlek 18'	Report		Stadium: Gradski Vrt Stadium

24 June 2022 Friendly	ATSV Wolfsberg (Austria)	0–4	(Croatia) Osijek	Wolfsberg, Austria
18:00 CEST (UTC+02:00)		Report	Miérez 10'; Mance 65', 67'; Petković 81'	Stadium: ATSV Arena; Attendance: 700

25 June 2022 Friendly	Austria Klagenfurt	1–4	(Croatia) Osijek	Feldkirchen in Kärnten, Austria
15:00 CEST (UTC+02:00)	Cvetko 31'	Report	Brlek 8', 81'; Janjić (yellow card) 40'; Petković 62'; Topčagić 65'	Stadium: Modehaus NIMO-ARENA

1 July 2022 Friendly	Universitatea Cluj (Romania)	0–1	(Croatia) Osijek	Beltinci, Slovenia
17:30 CEST (UTC+02:00)	Ilie (yellow card) 59'; Baravykas (yellow card) 68'	Report	Škorić (yellow card) 12'; Lovrić 71' (pen.); Bakić (yellow card) 74'	Stadium: Beltinci Sports Park; Referee: Slavko Nemet

2 July 2022 Friendly	Polet Sveti Martin na Muri	1–7	Osijek	Sveti Martin na Muri
11:00 CEST (UTC+02:00)	Patafta 41'	Report	Beljo 9', 78'; Barri 13'; Stojko 14' (o.g.); Fućak 35'; Topčagić 67'; Bakić 75'	Stadium: NK POLET (SMnM); Attendance: 350

9 July 2022 Friendly	Osijek (Croatia)	1–0	(Bosnia and Herzegovina) Krupa	Osijek, Croatia
18:30 CEST (UTC+02:00)	Leovac 28'	Report	Rudan (yellow card) 52'	Stadium: Gradski Vrt Stadium; Attendance: 800

13 July 2022 Friendly	Osijek (Croatia)	2–0	(Hungary) Kecskeméti	Osijek, Croatia
18:30 CEST (UTC+02:00)	Mance 77'; Topčagić 80'	Report	Vágó (red card) 55'	Stadium: Gradski Vrt Stadium

==== On-season (2022) ====
10 August 2022 Friendly	Osijek	7–0	Đakovo Croatia	Osijek
18:00 CEST (UTC+02:00)	Miérez 26', 43'; Caktaš 54', 59', 70'; Janjić 65'; Miloš 85'	Report		Stadium: Gradski Vrt Stadium

24 August 2022 Friendly	Osijek	11–0	Borac Kneževi Vinogradi	Osijek
18:00 CEST (UTC+02:00)	Fućak 5'; Mance 7', 25', 38', 41'; Janjić 9'; Caktaš 45'; Gržan 61'; Barri 67'; Bakić 73'; Kleinheisler 89'	Report		Stadium: Gradski Vrt Stadium

24 September 2022 Friendly	Osijek (Croatia)	2–3	(Bosnia and Herzegovina) Široki Brijeg	Borovo Naselje, Croatia
13:00 CEST (UTC+02:00)	Miérez 6' (pen.); Topčagić 55'; Jugović (yellow card) (yellow-red card) 71'	Report	Cheberko 33' (o.g.); Lukić 34'; Pejić 39'	Stadium: Gradski stadion Borovo Naselje

25 September 2022 Friendly	Vukovar 1991	0–1	Osijek	Borovo Naselje
13:00 CEST (UTC+02:00)		Report	Brlek 45'	Stadium: Gradski stadion Borovo Naselje

==== Mid-season ====
7 January 2023 Friendly	Osijek (Croatia)	4–4	(Slovenia) Koper	Umag, Croatia
11:00 CET (UTC+01:00)	Špoljarić 4', 9', 23'; Alexander (yellow card) 30'; Leovac (yellow card) 43'; Bakić 76'	Report	Kim (yellow card) 30'; Ochieng 52'; Stanojević 54'; Nkada 61'; Požeg Vancaš 72'	Stadium: Stella Maris sports center

7 January 2023 Friendly	Osijek (Croatia)	1–2	(Hungary) Honvéd	Umag, Croatia
13:00 CET (UTC+01:00)	Lovrić 69'	Report	Žaper 24' (o.g.); Lukić 81'	Stadium: Stella Maris sports center

14 January 2023 Friendly	Osijek (Croatia)	2–1	(Serbia) Javor Ivanjica	Umag, Croatia
11:00 CET (UTC+01:00)	Bakić 70' (pen.); Omerović 85'	Report	Gigić 43'	Stadium: Sportski centar Stella Maris

14 January 2023 Friendly	Osijek (Croatia)	1–0	(Hungary) Fehérvár	Umag, Croatia
13:00 CET (UTC+01:00)	Janjić (yellow card) 32'; Miérez 76'	Report	Serafimov (yellow card) 61'; Schön (red card) 88'	Stadium: Stella Maris sports center

==== On-season (2023) ====
24 March 2023 Friendly	Osijek (Croatia)	0–0	(Hungary) Tiszakécske	Felcsút, Hungary
15:00 CET (UTC+01:00)		Report		Stadium: Pancho Aréna (training ground); Attendance: Behind closed doors

== Player seasonal records ==
Updated 28 May 2023

=== Goals ===
Rank	Name	League	Europe	Cup	Total
1	(Argentina) Ramón Miérez	12	–	–	12
2	(Croatia) Dion Drena Beljo	8	–	1	9
2	(Croatia) Mijo Caktaš	8	–	1	9
4	(Hungary) László Kleinheisler	6	1	1	8
5	(Croatia) Marin Leovac	2	–	–	2
5	(Croatia) Josip Špoljarić	2	–	–	2
5	(Croatia) Vedran Jugović	1	–	1	2
8	(Bosnia and Herzegovina) Adrian Leon Barišić	1	–	–	1
8	(Croatia) Domagoj Bukvić	1	–	–	1
8	(Croatia) Šime Gržan	1	–	–	1
8	(Croatia) Darko Nejašmić	1	–	–	1
8	(Croatia) Mihael Žaper	1	–	–	1
8	(Austria) Mihret Topčagić	–	1	–	1
8	(Croatia) Filip Živković	–	–	1	1
Own goals		2	–	–	2
TOTALS		46	2	5	53

Source: Competitive matches

=== Clean sheets ===
Rank	Name	League	Europe	Cup	Total
1	(Croatia) Marko Malenica	6	–	1	7
2	(Croatia) Ivica Ivušić	6	–	–	6
TOTALS		12	0	1	13

Source: Competitive matches

=== Disciplinary record ===
Number	Position	Player	HNL			Europe			Croatian Cup			Total		
Number	Position	Player	Yellow card	(yellow card) (yellow-red card)	Red card	Yellow card	(yellow card) (yellow-red card)	Red card	Yellow card	(yellow card) (yellow-red card)	Red card	Yellow card	(yellow card) (yellow-red card)	Red card
2	DF	(Croatia) Karlo Bartolec	0	0	0	1	0	0	0	0	0	1	0	0
4	DF	(Croatia) Marin Leovac	8	0	0	0	0	0	0	0	0	8	0	0
5	MF	(Hungary) László Kleinheisler	2	0	0	0	0	0	0	0	0	2	0	0
6	MF	(Croatia) Darko Nejašmić	1	0	0	0	0	0	0	0	0	1	0	0
7	MF	(Croatia) Vedran Jugović	6	0	0	0	0	0	0	0	0	6	0	0
8	MF	(Spain) Diego Barri	2	0	0	0	0	0	1	0	0	3	0	0
9	FW	(Croatia) Dion Drena Beljo	1	0	0	0	0	0	1	0	0	2	0	0
10	MF	(Bosnia and Herzegovina) Amer Hiroš	1	0	0	0	0	0	0	0	0	1	0	0
10	FW	(Croatia) Josip Špoljarić	2	0	0	0	0	0	0	0	0	2	0	0
11	MF	(Croatia) Mijo Caktaš	2	0	0	0	0	0	1	0	0	3	0	0
13	FW	(Argentina) Ramón Miérez	5	0	1	0	0	0	0	0	0	5	0	1
14	MF	(Croatia) Ivan Fiolić	5	0	0	0	0	0	0	0	0	5	0	0
15	GK	(Croatia) Marko Barešić	1	0	0	0	0	0	0	0	0	1	0	0
17	FW	(Croatia) Šime Gržan	1	0	0	0	0	0	0	0	0	1	0	0
19	MF	(Croatia) Mihael Žaper	4	0	0	0	0	0	1	0	0	5	0	0
20	DF	(Slovenia) Mario Jurčević	5	0	0	1	0	0	0	0	0	6	0	0
21	DF	(Croatia) Mile Škorić	4	0	0	0	0	0	1	0	0	5	0	0
22	DF	(Croatia) Danijel Lončar	3	0	0	0	0	0	1	0	0	4	0	0
23	MF	(Croatia) Petar Brlek	2	0	0	0	0	0	0	0	0	2	0	0
24	FW	(Croatia) Filip Živković	1	0	0	0	0	0	0	0	0	1	0	0
28	DF	(Croatia) Slavko Bralić	1	0	0	0	0	0	0	0	0	1	0	0
31	GK	(Croatia) Marko Malenica	1	0	0	0	0	0	0	0	0	1	0	0
36	MF	(Bosnia and Herzegovina) Nail Omerović	2	0	0	0	0	0	0	0	0	2	0	0
37	DF	(Bosnia and Herzegovina) Adrian Leon Barišić	5	0	0	0	0	0	0	0	0	5	0	0
39	DF	(Croatia) Domagoj Bukvić	1	0	0	0	0	0	0	0	0	1	0	0
44	FW	(Croatia) Kristijan Lovrić	3	0	0	0	0	0	0	0	0	3	0	0
95	FW	(Croatia) Antonio Mance	1	0	0	0	0	0	0	0	1	1	0	1
98	DF	(Ukraine) Yevhen Cheberko	3	0	0	0	0	0	1	0	1	4	0	1
TOTALS			73	0	1	2	0	0	7	0	2	82	0	3

=== Appearances and goals ===
Number	Position	Player	Apps	Goals	Apps	Goals	Apps	Goals	Apps	Goals
Number	Position	Player	Total		HNL (Note: First number represents appearances in starting eleven, while the second number indicates a substitute appearance.)		Conference League		Croatian Cup	
1	GK	(Croatia) Ivica Ivušić	19	0	17+0	0	2+0	0	0+0	0
2	DF	(Croatia) Karlo Bartolec	10	0	5+2	0	2+0	0	1+0	0
4	DF	(Croatia) Marin Leovac	23	2	19+2	2	1+0	0	1+0	0
5	MF	(Hungary) László Kleinheisler	20	8	14+2	6	2+0	1	1+1	1
6	MF	(Croatia) Darko Nejašmić	30	1	23+4	1	2+0	0	1+0	0
7	MF	(Croatia) Vedran Jugović	35	2	30+2	1	0+0	0	3+0	1
8	MF	(Spain) Diego Barri	12	0	4+6	0	0+0	0	1+1	0
9	FW	(Croatia) Dion Drena Beljo	19	9	13+3	8	0+1	0	1+1	1
10	MF	(Bosnia and Herzegovina) Amer Hiroš	6	0	0+5	0	0+0	0	1+0	0
10	FW	(Croatia) Josip Špoljarić	19	2	5+12	2	0+0	0	1+1	0
11	MF	(Croatia) Mijo Caktaš	34	9	28+1	8	1+1	0	2+1	1
13	FW	(Argentina) Ramón Miérez	37	12	27+6	12	1+1	0	2+0	0
14	MF	(Croatia) Ivan Fiolić	24	0	15+6	0	2+0	0	1+0	0
16	FW	(Montenegro) Nikola Janjić	5	0	1+3	0	0+1	0	0+0	0
17	FW	(Croatia) Šime Gržan	25	1	18+7	1	0+0	0	0+0	0
19	MF	(Croatia) Mihael Žaper	32	1	26+2	1	0+1	0	3+0	0
20	DF	(Slovenia) Mario Jurčević	29	0	18+7	0	1+1	0	2+0	0
21	DF	(Croatia) Mile Škorić	14	0	10+1	0	2+0	0	1+0	0
22	DF	(Croatia) Danijel Lončar	12	0	9+1	0	1+0	0	1+0	0
23	MF	(Croatia) Petar Brlek	12	0	5+4	0	2+0	0	1+0	0
24	FW	(Croatia) Filip Živković	11	1	2+8	0	0+0	0	0+1	1
25	MF	(Montenegro) Ognjen Bakić	14	0	1+12	0	0+0	0	0+1	0
26	FW	(Croatia) Filip Mažar	1	0	0+1	0	0+0	0	0+0	0
28	DF	(Croatia) Slavko Bralić	8	0	3+4	0	1+0	0	0+0	0
29	FW	(Croatia) Kristian Fućak	4	0	3+1	0	0+0	0	0+0	0
30	FW	(Austria) Mihret Topčagić	10	1	2+6	0	1+0	1	1+0	0
31	GK	(Croatia) Marko Malenica	21	0	19+0	0	0+0	0	2+0	0
34	DF	(Croatia) Ivan Cvijanović	1	0	0+1	0	0+0	0	0+0	0
36	MF	(Bosnia and Herzegovina) Nail Omerović	18	0	13+4	0	0+0	0	0+1	0
37	DF	(Bosnia and Herzegovina) Adrian Leon Barišić	29	1	26+1	1	0+0	0	1+1	0
39	DF	(Croatia) Domagoj Bukvić	10	1	8+2	1	0+0	0	0+0	0
40	MF	(Croatia) Dominik Babić	1	0	0+1	0	0+0	0	0+0	0
44	FW	(Croatia) Kristijan Lovrić	22	0	11+8	0	1+1	0	1+0	0
77	DF	(Croatia) Mato Miloš	7	0	3+3	0	0+1	0	0+0	0
95	FW	(Croatia) Antonio Mance	10	0	0+8	0	0+1	0	0+1	0
98	DF	(Ukraine) Yevhen Cheberko	23	0	18+2	0	0+0	0	3+0	0
