= Petar Brlek =

Croatian footballer

Personal information
- Full name: Petar Brlek
- Date of birth: 29 January 1994 (age 32)
- Place of birth: Varaždin, Croatia
- Height: 1.82 m (6 ft 0 in)
- Position: Midfielder

Team information
- Current team: Cibalia
- Number: 14

Youth career
- Varteks
- 2007–2008: NK Sloboda Tužno
- 2008–2010: Varteks
- 2010–2011: Slaven Belupo

Senior career*
Years	Team	Apps	(Gls)
2011–2016	Slaven Belupo	112	(4)
2016–2017	Wisła Kraków	43	(10)
2017–2021	Genoa	5	(0)
2018	→ Wisła Kraków (loan)	7	(0)
2018–2019	→ Lugano (loan)	25	(2)
2019–2020	→ Ascoli (loan)	33	(0)
2021–2024	Osijek	58	(2)
2025	Wieczysta Kraków	16	(1)
2025–	Cibalia	21	(2)

International career
2009	Croatia U15	2	(0)
2009–2010	Croatia U16	6	(0)
2010–2011	Croatia U17	13	(2)
2011	Croatia U18	3	(0)
2011–2013	Croatia U19	15	(2)
2013	Croatia U20	4	(0)
2014–2015	Croatia U21	9	(0)
- * Club domestic league appearances and goals as of 16 June 2026

Petar Brlek (Croatian pronunciation: [pětar bř̩lek, pê-]; born 29 January 1994) is a Croatian professional footballer who plays as a midfielder for Croatian First Football League side Cibalia.

== Club career ==
On 27 February 2016, Brlek signed a three-and-a-half-year contract with Polish side Wisła Kraków.

On 24 August 2017, he joined Serie A side Genoa. However, after playing only five matches with the Italian club, on 27 February 2018, he was loaned to his former club Wisła Kraków.

On 31 July 2019, Brlek joined Ascoli on loan until 30 June 2020 with an option to buy.

On 9 December 2024, Brlek signed an eighteen-month contract with Polish third-tier club Wieczysta Kraków, effective from 1 January 2025, with an option for a one-year extension. On 24 August 2025, he left Wieczysta by mutual consent.

== Personal life ==
On 2 October 2020, he tested positive for COVID-19.

== Career statistics ==
As of match played 27 July 2025

Appearances and goals by club, season and competition
Club	Season	League			National cup (Note: Includes Croatian Cup, Polish Cup, Coppa Italia, Swiss Cup)		Europe		Total	
Club	Season	Division	Apps	Goals	Apps	Goals	Apps	Goals	Apps	Goals
Slaven Belupo	2010–11	1. HNL	1	0	—		—		1	0
Slaven Belupo	2011–12	1. HNL	5	0	—		—		5	0
Slaven Belupo	2012–13	1. HNL	22	0	4	0	2 (Note: Appearances in UEFA Europa League)	1	28	1
Slaven Belupo	2013–14	1. HNL	32	3	5	0	—		37	3
Slaven Belupo	2014–15	1. HNL	30	1	1	0	—		31	1
Slaven Belupo	2015–16	1. HNL	22	0	2	2	—		24	2
Slaven Belupo	Total		112	4	12	2	2	1	126	7
Wisła Kraków	2015–16	Ekstraklasa	7	0	—		—		7	0
Wisła Kraków	2016–17	Ekstraklasa	31	8	4	1	—		35	9
Wisła Kraków	2017–18	Ekstraklasa	5	2	1	0	—		6	2
Wisła Kraków	Total		43	10	5	1	—		48	11
Genoa	2017–18	Serie A	5	0	2	0	—		7	0
Wisła Kraków (loan)	2017–18	Ekstraklasa	7	0	—		—		7	0
Lugano (loan)	2018–19	Swiss Super League	25	2	2	0	—		27	2
Ascoli (loan)	2019–20	Serie B	33	0	2	0	—		35	0
Osijek	2020–21	1. HNL	6	1	0	0	—		6	1
Osijek	2021–22	1. HNL	17	0	1	0	—		18	0
Osijek	2022–23	1. HNL	9	0	1	0	2 (Note: Appearances in UEFA Europa Conference League)	0	12	0
Osijek	2023–24	1. HNL	26	1	1	0	4	0	31	1
Osijek	Total		58	2	3	0	6	0	67	2
Wieczysta Kraków	2024–25	II liga	14	1	—		—		14	1
Wieczysta Kraków	2025–26	I liga	2	0	—		—		2	0
Wieczysta Kraków	Total		16	1	—		—		16	1
Career total			299	19	26	3	8	1	333	23
