= Anton Matković =

Croatian footballer (born 2006)

Personal information
- Date of birth: 19 February 2006 (age 20)
- Place of birth: Slavonski Brod, Croatia
- Height: 1.91 m (6 ft 3 in)
- Position: Forward

Team information
- Current team: Osijek
- Number: 34

Youth career
- 2013–2015: Budainka-Kolonija
- 2016: Željezničar Slavonski Brod
- 2016–2022: Marsonia
- 2022–2023: Osijek

Senior career*
Years	Team	Apps	(Gls)
2023–	Osijek	50	(6)

International career^{‡}
2023	Croatia U17	5	(0)
2023	Croatia U18	3	(3)
2023–2024	Croatia U19	8	(2)
2024–	Croatia U21	3	(0)
- * Club domestic league appearances and goals as of 08:21, 29 May 2026 (UTC) ‡ National team caps and goals as of 08:21, 29 May 2026 (UTC)

Anton Matković (born 19 February 2006) is a Croatian professional footballer who plays as a forward for Osijek.

== Club career ==
Matković started his career with smaller clubs from his hometown - Budainka-Kolonija and Željezničar Slavonski Brod. He subsequently joined the Marsonia academy at the age of 10, staying there for six seasons, before moving to Osijek in August 2022. On 8 November 2023, he made his professional league debut as a late substitute in a 1–0 loss against Hajduk Split. On 25 November 2023, he scored his first senior goal, coming off the bench to score against Dinamo Zagreb.

== International career ==
Matković has represented Croatia at various youth levels.

== Career statistics ==
=== Club ===
As of match played 20 May 2024

Appearances and goals by club, season and competition
Club	Season	League			National cup (Note: Includes Croatian Cup)		Continental		Other		Total	
Club	Season	Division	Apps	Goals	Apps	Goals	Apps	Goals	Apps	Goals	Apps	Goals
Osijek	2023–24	1. HNL	17	5	1	0	—		—		18	5
Career total			17	5	1	0	0	0	0	0	18	5
