= Terrence Douglas =

Dutch footballer (born 2001)

Personal information
- Full name: Terrence John Douglas
- Date of birth: 14 September 2001 (age 25)
- Place of birth: Amsterdam, Netherlands
- Height: 1.86 m (6 ft 1 in)
- Position: Left-back

Team information
- Current team: Juve Stabia
- Number: 25

Youth career
- 2007–2009: Zeeburgia
- 2009–2019: Ajax

Senior career*
Years	Team	Apps	(Gls)
2019–2022	Jong Ajax	44	(2)
2022	→ Den Bosch (loan)	12	(0)
2022–2023	Roda JC	30	(1)
2023–2024	Istra 1961	13	(0)
2024–2026	Eindhoven	58	(3)
2026–	Juve Stabia	7	(0)

International career
2016–2017	Netherlands U16	10	(1)
2017	Netherlands U17	1	(0)
2018	Netherlands U18	5	(0)
- * Club domestic league appearances and goals as of 1st November 2026

Terrence John Douglas (born 14 September 2001) is a Dutch professional footballer who plays as a left-back for Serie B club Juve Stabia.

== Club career ==
=== Ajax ===
Douglas began his football career with Zeeburgia, where he played until 2009. At the age of seven he moved to the youth academy of Ajax. In the 2016–17 season he was in the under-17 squad for the first time. In the following season he developed into a regular player for the side and made a total of 26 appearances, including one call-up for the under-19 team. The following season he played 21 gamed for the under-19 team and also made two appearances in the UEFA Youth League. At the end of the season he won the domestic double with the U19s.

He made his debut for Jong Ajax under head coach Michael Reiziger on 25 March 2019 against Jong Utrecht. The following season he finished the season with 21 appearances for the under-19 team, of which he played seven times in the UEFA Youth League, where he scored once – in a 1–1 draw against Chelsea.

In 2020–21 he became a regular starter for Jong Ajax. He scored his first professional goal against Jong Utrecht on 19 October 2020.

==== Loan to FC Den Bosch ====
On 31 January 2022, Douglas moved to FC Den Bosch on loan for the remainder of the 2021–22 season, with an option to make the transfer permanent upon the completion of the loan. He made his competitive debut for the club on 6 February against ADO Den Haag, starting at left-back and impressing at the position despite the game ending in a 1–0 loss.

=== Roda JC ===
On 1 July 2022, Douglas signed a two-year contract with Eerste Divisie club Roda JC Kerkrade. He made his competitive debut for the club on 12 August, starting at left-back in a 1–0 home victory over his former club Jong Ajax. On 5 February 2023, in a local derby against MVV, Douglas scored his first goal and the matchwinner for Roda off a header from Sami Ouaissa's corner-kick to secure a 2–1 home win.

=== Istra 1961 ===
On 19 July 2023, Douglas signed a three-year contract with Croatian Football League club Istra 1961.

=== Eindhoven ===
On 29 August 2024, Douglas returned to the Netherlands and signed a contract with Eindhoven for one season, with the club option to extend for a second season.

=== Juve Stabia ===
In summer 2026, Douglas moved to Italy, joining Juve Stabia in Serie B for three years.

== International career ==
Born in the Netherlands, Douglas is of Surinamese descent. Douglas is a youth international for the Netherlands, having gained 16 caps at different youth levels.

== Career statistics ==
As of match played 16 December 2023

Appearances and goals by club, season and competition
Club	Season	League			Cup		Continental		Other		Total	
Club	Season	Division	Apps	Goals	Apps	Goals	Apps	Goals	Apps	Goals	Apps	Goals
Jong Ajax	2018–19	Eerste Divisie	1	0	—		—		—		1	0
Jong Ajax	2019–20	Eerste Divisie	1	0	—		—		—		1	0
Jong Ajax	2020–21	Eerste Divisie	31	1	—		—		—		31	1
Jong Ajax	2021–22	Eerste Divisie	11	1	—		—		—		31	1
Jong Ajax	Total		44	2	—		—		—		44	2
FC Den Bosch (loan)	2021–22	Eerste Divisie	12	0	0	0	—		—		12	0
Roda JC	2022–23	Eerste Divisie	30	1	1	0	—		—		31	1
Istra 1961	2023–24	Croatian Football League	11	0	1	0	—		—		12	0
Career total			97	3	2	0	0	0	0	0	99	3
