= Ognjen Bakić =

Montenegrin footballer (born 2003)

Personal information
- Date of birth: 6 January 2003 (age 23)
- Place of birth: Kotor, FR Yugoslavia
- Height: 1.78 m (5 ft 10 in)
- Position: Midfielder

Team information
- Current team: Gorica
- Number: 7

Youth career
- –2019: Grbalj
- 2019–2022: Olimpija Ljubljana

Senior career*
Years	Team	Apps	(Gls)
2021	Olimpija Ljubljana	1	(0)
2022–2023	Osijek II	15	(0)
2022–2023	Osijek	13	(0)
2023–2024	Trabzonspor	0	(0)
2024–2025	Šibenik	33	(0)
2025–	Gorica	27	(1)

International career
2017	Montenegro U15	4	(1)
2018	Montenegro U16	4	(1)
2018	Montenegro U17	13	(3)
2020	Montenegro U18	2	(0)
2021	Montenegro U19	8	(1)
2022–2024	Montenegro U21	13	(0)
- * Club domestic league appearances and goals as of 15 June 2026

Ognjen Bakić (Montenegrin: Огњен Бакић; born 6 January 2003) is a Montenegrin professional footballer who plays as a Midfielder for Gorica.

== Club career ==
Trabzonspor parted ways with Bakić after one year and no official matches played. Bakić joined Šibenik in the summer of 2024.
