= Zoran Josipovic =

Swiss footballer (born 1995)

Personal information
- Date of birth: 25 August 1995 (age 31)
- Place of birth: Mendrisio, Switzerland
- Height: 1.91 m (6 ft 3 in)
- Position: Striker

Team information
- Current team: FC Collina d'Oro
- Number: 9

Youth career
- –2011: Lugano
- 2011: Chiasso
- 2011–2013: Juventus

Senior career*
Years	Team	Apps	(Gls)
2013–2016	Juventus	0	(0)
2013–2014	→ Novara (loan)	4	(0)
2014–2016	→ Lugano (loan)	16	(2)
2016	→ Aarau (loan)	12	(5)
2016–2017	Aarau	38	(6)
2017–2019	Chiasso	57	(19)
2019–2020	Beroe Stara Zagora	19	(6)
2020–2021	Celta de Vigo B	15	(1)
2022	Lugano	1	(0)
2022	Dinamo Minsk	11	(2)
2023–2024	Istra 1961	12	(0)
2024	AC Taverne	13	(3)
2024–	FC Collina d'Oro		

International career
2011	Switzerland U16	2	(2)
2012	Switzerland U17	3	(0)
- * Club domestic league appearances and goals as of 31 May 2024

Zoran Josipovic (Croatian: Josipović; born 25 August 1995) is a Swiss professional footballer who plays for FC Collina d'Oro in the fourth-tier 1. Liga as a forward.

== Career ==
A youth product of the Swiss clubs Lugano and FC Chiasso, Josipovic moved to the youth academy of Juventus in 2011. He spent his early career on loan with Novara, Lugano and Aarau. In 2016, he signed permanently with Aarau, moving to Chiasso the next season. He followed that up with stints at Beroe and Celta B. In January 2022, he returned to Lugano in the Swiss Super League. In 2022, he signed a contract with NK Istra until Jun 30, 2025.

== Career statistics ==
=== Club ===
As of match played 14 February 2021

Appearances and goals by club, season and competition
Club	Season	League			National Cup		Continental		Total	
Club	Season	Division	Apps	Goals	Apps	Goals	Apps	Goals	Apps	Goals
Novara (loan)	2013–14	Serie B	4	0	0	0	—		4	0
Lugano (loan)	2014–15	Swiss Challenge League	7	1	1	0	—		8	1
Lugano (loan)	2015–16	Swiss Super League	9	1	3	0	—		12	1
Lugano (loan)	Total		16	2	4	0	0	0	20	2
Aarau (loan)	2015–16	Swiss Challenge League	12	5	0	0	—		12	5
Aarau	2016–17	Swiss Challenge League	32	6	3	1	—		35	7
Aarau	2017–18	Swiss Challenge League	6	0	0	0	—		6	0
Aarau	Total		50	11	3	1	0	0	53	12
Chiasso	2017–18	Swiss Challenge League	27	8	1	0	—		28	8
Chiasso	2018–19	Swiss Challenge League	30	11	2	0	—		32	11
Chiasso	Total		57	19	3	0	0	0	60	19
Beroe	2019–20	First League	19	6	1	0	—		20	6
Beroe	2020–21	First League	0	0	0	0	—		0	0
Beroe	Total		19	6	1	0	0	0	20	6
Celta B	2020–21	Segunda División B	10	1	—		—		10	1
Career total			156	39	11	1	0	0	167	40
