= Petrovija =

Petrovija Petrovia
- Village
- Location within Croatia
- Coordinates: 45°25′19″N 13°33′43″E
- Country: Croatia
- County: Istria County
- Municipality: Umag

Area
  - Total: 1.6 sq mi (4.2 km^{2})

Population (2021)
  - Total: 497
  - Density: 310/sq mi (120/km^{2})
- Time zone: UTC+1 (CET)
  - Summer (DST): UTC+2 (CEST)
- Postal code: 52470 Umag
- Area code: 052

Petrovija (Italian: Petrovia) is a village in Umag municipality in Istria County, Croatia.

== Demographics ==
According to the 2021 census, its population was 497. It was 406 in 2001 and at the 2011 census its population was 461.
