= Mario Jurčević =

Slovenian footballer (born 1995)

Personal information
- Date of birth: 1 June 1995 (age 31)
- Place of birth: Ljubljana, Slovenia
- Height: 1.86 m (6 ft 1 in)
- Position: Left-back

Team information
- Current team: Partizan
- Number: 4

Youth career
- 2006–2009: Bravo
- 2009–2013: Interblock
- 2013–2014: Olimpija Ljubljana

Senior career*
Years	Team	Apps	(Gls)
2014–2020	Olimpija Ljubljana	62	(3)
2014–2015	→ Radomlje (loan)	15	(0)
2017–2018	→ Aluminij (loan)	27	(0)
2020–2023	Osijek	65	(1)
2023–2024	Apollon Limassol	26	(2)
2024–	Partizan	42	(2)

International career
2020–2021	Slovenia	4	(0)
- * Club domestic league appearances and goals as of 22 November 2026

Mario Jurčević (born 1 June 1995) is a Slovenian professional footballer who plays as a left-back for Serbian SuperLiga club Partizan.

== International career ==
Jurčević made his national team debut for Slovenia on 7 October 2020 in a friendly against San Marino.

== Personal life ==
Jurčević is of paternal Croatian and maternal Serbian descent.

== Career statistics ==
As of 27 July 2024

Appearances and goals by club, season and competition
Club	Season	League			National cup		Continental		Total	
Club	Season	Division	Apps	Goals	Apps	Goals	Apps	Goals	Apps	Goals
Olimpija Ljubljana	2013–14	Slovenian PrvaLiga	1	0	—		—		1	0
Olimpija Ljubljana	2014–15	Slovenian PrvaLiga	3	0	2	0	—		5	0
Olimpija Ljubljana	2016–17	Slovenian PrvaLiga	9	0	1	0	—		10	0
Olimpija Ljubljana	2018–19	Slovenian PrvaLiga	19	2	5	0	0	0	24	2
Olimpija Ljubljana	2019–20	Slovenian PrvaLiga	30	1	1	0	4 (Note: Appearances in UEFA Europa League)	0	35	1
Olimpija Ljubljana	Total		62	3	9	0	4	0	75	3
Radomlje (loan)	2014–15	Slovenian PrvaLiga	1	0	0	0	—		1	0
Radomlje (loan)	2015–16	Slovenian Second League	14	0	1	0	—		15	0
Radomlje (loan)	Total		15	0	1	0	—		16	0
Aluminij (loan)	2017–18	Slovenian PrvaLiga	27	0	5	0	—		32	0
Osijek	2020–21	Croatian Football League	23	0	1	0	0	0	24	0
Osijek	2021–22	Croatian Football League	17	1	0	0	3 (Note: Appearances in UEFA Europa Conference League)	0	20	1
Osijek	2022–23	Croatian Football League	25	0	2	0	2	0	29	0
Osijek	Total		65	1	3	0	5	0	73	1
Apollon Limassol	2023–24	Cypriot First Division	26	2	2	0	—		28	2
Partizan	2024–25	Serbian SuperLiga	1	0	0	0	0	0	1	0
Career total			196	6	20	0	9	0	225	6
