= Marko Malenica =

Croatian footballer

Personal information
- Date of birth: 8 February 1994 (age 32)
- Place of birth: Nova Gradiška, Croatia
- Height: 1.93 m (6 ft 4 in)
- Position: Goalkeeper

Team information
- Current team: Osijek
- Number: 31

Youth career
- –2008: Sloga Nova Gradiška
- 2008–2013: Osijek

Senior career*
Years	Team	Apps	(Gls)
2013–	Osijek	214	(0)
2014	→ Cibalia (loan)	9	(0)
2015	→ Segesta (loan)	14	(0)
2020	→ Lech Poznań (loan)	0	(0)
2020	→ Lech Poznań II (loan)	3	(0)
2021	→ Diósgyőri (loan)	14	(0)
2016	Osijek II	3	(0)

International career
2011	Croatia U17	3	(0)
2012	Croatia U18	4	(0)
2011–2013	Croatia U19	13	(0)
2015	Croatia U21	1	(0)
- * Club domestic league appearances and goals as of 15 June 2026

Marko Malenica (born 8 February 1994) is a Croatian professional footballer who plays as a goalkeeper for NK Osijek.

== Club career ==
A product of the NK Osijek youth system, he has presented the Croatian youth national teams. He has been loaned out to many clubs, including NK Cibalia and HNK Segesta in Croatia, to Lech Poznań and their reserves in Poland and Diósgyőri VTK in Hungary.

== Career statistics ==
As of match played 12 June 2024

Appearances and goals by club, season and competition
Club	Season	League			National cup (Note: Includes Croatian Cup, Polish Cup, Magyar Kupa)		Continental		Other		Total	
Club	Season	Division	Apps	Goals	Apps	Goals	Apps	Goals	Apps	Goals	Apps	Goals
Osijek	2012–13	Prva HNL	1	0	—		—		—		1	0
Osijek	2013–14	Prva HNL	8	0	3	0	—		—		11	0
Osijek	2015–16	Prva HNL	9	0	0	0	—		—		9	0
Osijek	2016–17	Prva HNL	10	0	4	0	—		—		14	0
Osijek	2017–18	Prva HNL	31	0	0	0	8 (Note: Appearances in UEFA Europa League)	0	—		39	0
Osijek	2018–19	Prva HNL	36	0	2	0	4	0	—		42	0
Osijek	2019–20	Prva HNL	0	0	1	0	0	0	—		1	0
Osijek	2021–22	Prva HNL	10	0	2	0	0	0	—		12	0
Osijek	2022–23	Prva HNL	19	0	3	0	0	0	—		22	0
Osijek	2023–24	Prva HNL	28	0	2	0	4 (Note: Appearances in UEFA Europa Conference League)	0	—		34	0
Osijek	Total		152	0	17	0	16	0	—		185	0
Cibalia (loan)	2014–15	Druga HNL	8	0	1	0	—		—		9	0
Segesta (loan)	2014–15	Druga HNL	14	0	—		—		—		14	0
Osijek II	2016–17	Treća HNL Istok	3	0	—		—		—		3	0
Lech Poznań (loan)	2020–21	Ekstraklasa	0	0	1	0	0	0	—		1	0
Lech Poznań II (loan)	2020–21	II liga	3	0	0	0	—		—		3	0
Diósgyőri (loan)	2020–21	Nemzeti Bajnokság I	14	0	2	0	—		—		16	0
Career total			194	0	21	0	16	0	0	0	231	0
