= Nikola Janjić =

Montenegrin footballer

Personal information
- Date of birth: 14 July 2002 (age 24)
- Place of birth: Nikšić, FR Yugoslavia
- Height: 1.73 m (5 ft 8 in)
- Position: Winger

Team information
- Current team: Budućnost
- Number: 30

Youth career
- Anderba
- 2019–2022: Sutjeska Nikšić

Senior career*
| Years | Team | Apps | (Gls) |
| 2020–2022 | Sutjeska Nikšić | 63 | (11) |
| 2022–2024 | Osijek | 4 | (0) |
| 2023 | → Bravo (loan) | 15 | (0) |
| 2024 | → KFC Komárno (loan) | 2 | (0) |
| 2024–2025 | Sutjeska Nikšić | 31 | (8) |
| 2025 | Zrinjski Mostar | 4 | (0) |
| 2026– | Budućnost | 7 | (1) |

International career^{‡}
| 2017–2018 | Montenegro U16 | 8 | (0) |
| 2018 | Montenegro U17 | 9 | (1) |
| 2019 | Montenegro U18 | 4 | (1) |
| 2019–2021 | Montenegro U19 | 18 | (1) |
| 2021–2024 | Montenegro U21 | 26 | (3) |
| 2022– | Montenegro | 1 | (0) |
- * Club domestic league appearances and goals as of 17 June 2026 ‡ National team caps and goals as of 15 October 2024

Nikola Janjić (Serbian Cyrillic: Никола Јањић; born 14 July 2002) is a Montenegrin professional footballer who plays as a winger for Montenegrin First League club Budućnost.

== Club career ==
=== NK Osijek ===
Janjić signed a four-year contract with Osijek in January 2022. He joins his new team at the end of the 2021–22 Montenegrin First League season, when he played for Sutjeska Nikšić.

=== NK Bravo ===
On 14 July 2023, Janjić moved to Slovenian side Bravo on a loan-deal for the rest of the 2023–24 season.

== International career ==
Janjić was called in Montenegro U16, Montenegro U17, Montenegro U18, Montenegro U19 and Montenegro U21 national team squads before becoming part of Montenegro national football team, and debuting as a substitution in a friendly win against Greece.

== Honours ==
Sutjeska Nikšić

- Montenegrin First League runner-up: 2019–20, 2020–21

Individual

- The most promising Montenegrin football player from the 2002 generation
