= Elias Filet =

French footballer (born 2002)

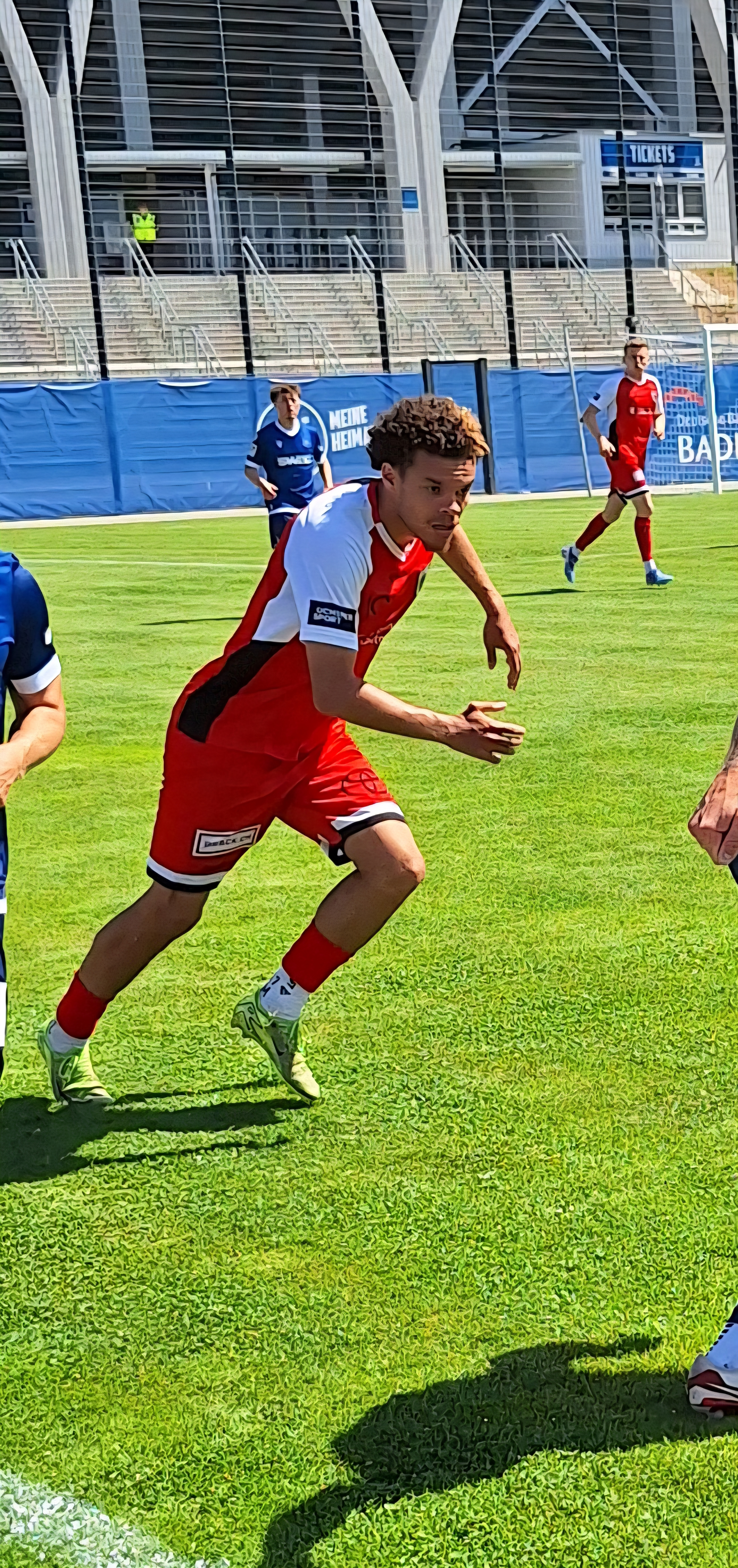

Personal information
- Full name: Elias Zaian Filet
- Date of birth: 6 March 2002 (age 24)
- Place of birth: Paris, France
- Height: 1.86 m (6 ft 1 in)
- Position: Striker

Team information
- Current team: RAAL La Louvière
- Number: 9

Senior career*
Years	Team	Apps	(Gls)
2021–2022	Sochaux	1	(0)
2021–2022	→ Sochaux B (loan)	24	(13)
2022–2023	Progrès	23	(20)
2023–2024	Istra 1961	30	(4)
2025–2026	Aarau	49	(20)
2026–	RAAL La Louvière	2	(0)
- * Club domestic league appearances and goals as of 16 August 2026

Elias Filet (born 6 March 2002) is a French footballer who plays as a striker for Belgian Pro League club RAAL La Louvière.

== Life and career ==
Filet was born on 6 March 2002 in France to French and Malagasy roots, he is a native of Paris. He is the son of a photographer mother and French musician Stefan Filey. He has been a supporter of English Premier League side Manchester United. He played handball as a child. He started playing football at the under-13 level. He mainly operates as a striker. He is left-footed. He joined the youth academy of French side Sochaux at the age of eighteen.

He started his senior career with the club. He made one league appearance and scored zero goals for them. He played for their reserve team, where he was regarded as one of their most important players. In 2022, he signed for Luxembourgish side Progrès. He was described as "established himself as one of the essential cogs" while playing for the club. He made twenty-three league appearances and scored twenty goals for them. In 2023, he signed for Croatian side Istra 1961.

In the summer of 2026, Filet signed a two-season contract with RAAL La Louvière in Belgium.

== Honours ==
Individual

- Swiss Challenge League Player of the Season 2025–26
