= Domagoj Bukvić =

Croatian footballer (born 2002)

Personal information
- Date of birth: 22 February 2002 (age 24)
- Place of birth: Osijek, Croatia
- Height: 1.74 m (5 ft 9 in)
- Position: Winger

Team information
- Current team: NK Osijek
- Number: 39

Youth career
- -2022: NK Osijek

Senior career*
Years	Team	Apps	(Gls)
2022–	Osijek	116	(6)

International career
2021-	Croatia U19		
2023-	Croatia U21		
- * Club domestic league appearances and goals as of 13 September 2026

Domagoj Bukvić (born 22 February 2002) is a Croatian footballer who plays as a winger for Croatian Football League club NK Osijek.

== Club career ==
Bukvić is a product of the NK Osijek youth system. He scored his first senior league goal for the club in Osijek's 3–1 victory away against Varaždin in May 2023. He was the leading assister in the HNL in the opening months of the 2023–24 season. Primarily a right winger, he was included in the list of the best young footballers in the world published by the Swiss Football Observatory (CIES) in December 2023. He signed a new professional contract with the club in 2024. He was also utilised during the 2024–25 season at right-back, and even left-back.

== International career ==
He is an international for the Croatia national under-21 football team.
