= Oleksandr Petrusenko =

Ukrainian footballer

Personal information
- Full name: Oleksandr Oleksandrovych Petrusenko
- Date of birth: 26 March 1998 (age 28)
- Place of birth: Kyiv, Ukraine
- Height: 1.81 m (5 ft 11 in)
- Position: Defensive midfielder

Team information
- Current team: Osijek
- Number: 16

Youth career
- 2006–2016: Youth Sportive School #15 Kyiv
- 2016–2019: Dynamo Kyiv

Senior career*
Years	Team	Apps	(Gls)
2019–2020	Hirnyk-Sport Horishni Plavni	28	(0)
2021–2022	Mynai	28	(0)
2022	Budapest Honvéd	12	(1)
2022–2024	Istra 1961	60	(0)
2024–2025	Antalyaspor	21	(0)
2025–	Osijek	24	(0)

International career^{‡}
2016–2017	Ukraine U19	4	(0)
2018	Ukraine U21	1	(0)
- * Club domestic league appearances and goals as of 15 June 2026 ‡ National team caps and goals as of 19 April 2021

Oleksandr Oleksandrovych Petrusenko (Ukrainian: Олександр Олександрович Петрусенко; born 26 March 1998) is a Ukrainian professional footballer who plays as a defensive midfielder for Croatian club Osijek.

== Career ==
Born in Kyiv, Petrusenko is a product of the local Youth Sportive School #15. His first trainers were Volodymyr Ralchenko and Ruslan Kanavskyi.

He played for FC Dynamo in the Ukrainian Premier League Reserves and was released in September 2019. In January 2021, Petrusenko signed contract with FC Mynai in the Ukrainian Premier League. He made his debut in the Ukrainian Premier League for Mynai on 13 February 2021, playing as the start squad player in a losing home match against FC Lviv.

In July 2025, Petrusenko returned to Croatia to join Croatian Football League club Osijek on a three-year deal.
