= 2024–25 NK Osijek season =

Osijek
2024–25 season
- Owner: NK OS d.o.o.
- President: Ferenc Szakály
- Head coach: Federico Coppitelli (until 19 March 2025); Simon Rožman (since 20 March 2025)
- Stadium: Opus Arena
- HNL: 7th
- Croatian Cup: Semi-finals
- UEFA Europa Conference League: Third qualifying round
- Top goalscorer: League: Arnel Jakupović (9); All: Arnel Jakupović (10)
- Highest home attendance: 11,532 v Hajduk Split (24 November 2024)
- Lowest home attendance: 2,674 v Varaždin (16 March 2025)
- Average home league attendance: 5,739
Home colours	Away colours

The 2024–25 NK Osijek season was the club's 78th season in existence and the 34th consecutive season in the top flight of Croatian football.

== Players ==
As of 22 February 2025

Note: Flags indicate national team as defined under FIFA eligibility rules; some limited exceptions apply. Players may hold more than one non-FIFA nationality.

No.	Pos.	Nation	Player
1	GK	ITA	Mattia Del Favero
5	DF	ARM	Styopa Mkrtchyan
6	MF	CRO	Hrvoje Babec (on loan from Riga)
7	MF	CRO	Vedran Jugović (vice-captain)
8	FW	NGR	Justice Ohajunwa
9	FW	SUI	Kemal Ademi
10	MF	BRA	Pedro Lima (on loan from Palmeiras)
13	DF	ITA	Alessandro Tuia
14	MF	CRO	Marko Soldo
15	DF	ALB	Jon Mersinaj
17	FW	AUT	Arnel Jakupović
18	MF	CRO	Niko Farkaš
20	MF	POR	Tiago Dantas

No.	Pos.	Nation	Player
22	DF	CRO	Roko Jurišić
24	FW	CRO	Filip Živković
26	DF	CRO	Luka Jelenić
27	FW	POR	Hernâni Fortes
31	GK	CRO	Marko Malenica (captain)
33	DF	SWE	Emin Hasić
34	FW	CRO	Anton Matković
36	MF	BIH	Nail Omerović
39	FW	CRO	Domagoj Bukvić
42	DF	BRA	Renan Guedes
55	DF	CRO	Ivan Cvijanović
66	MF	SUI	Petar Pušić
98	MF	CRO	Šimun Mikolčić

== Transfers ==
=== In ===
Pos	Player	Transferred from	Fee	Date	Source
DF	(Greece) Stefanos Evangelou	(Hungary) Zalaegerszeg	Return from loan	15 June 2024	
DF	(Croatia) Luka Jelenić	(Croatia) Varaždin	€800,000	26 June 2024	
MF	(Croatia) Marko Soldo	(Croatia) Dinamo Zagreb	€400,000	26 June 2024	
MF	(Brazil) Pedro Lima	(Brazil) Palmeiras	Loan	26 June 2024	
FW	(Netherlands) Ricuenio Kewal	(Netherlands) Jong AZ	Free	26 June 2024	
GK	(Croatia) Tin Sajko	(Croatia) Jarun	Return from loan	27 June 2024	
DF	(Croatia) Ivan Cvijanović	(Croatia) Šibenik	Return from loan	27 June 2024	
GK	(Croatia) Nikola Čavlina	(Croatia) Dinamo Zagreb	Loan	29 June 2024	
FW	(Montenegro) Nikola Janjić	(Slovakia) Komárno	Return from loan	30 June 2024	
FW	(Croatia) Vinko Petković	(Croatia) Rudeš	Return from loan	30 June 2024	
FW	(Switzerland) Kemal Ademi	(Switzerland) Luzern	Free	1 July 2024	
DF	(Sweden) Emin Hasić	(Sweden) IFK Värnamo	€400,000	13 August 2024	
DF	(Italy) Alessandro Tuia	(Italy) Cremonese	Free	29 August 2024	
MF	(Portugal) Tiago Dantas	(Portugal) Benfica	Free	29 August 2024	
FW	(Portugal) Hernâni Fortes	(Saudi Arabia) Al-Najma	Free	29 August 2024	
FW	(Austria) Arnel Jakupović	(Slovenia) Maribor	€1,000,000	30 August 2024	
FW	(Croatia) Kristian Fućak	(Hungary) Zalaegerszeg	Recalled from loan	14 January 2025	
MF	(Croatia) Hrvoje Babec	(Latvia) Riga	Loan	15 January 2025	
GK	(Italy) Mattia Del Favero	(Italy) Taranto	Free	4 February 2025	
DF	(Albania) Jon Mersinaj	(Croatia) Lokomotiva Zagreb	€200,000	14 February 2025	
FW	(Nigeria) Justice Ohajunwa	(Moldova) Zimbru Chișinău	€250,000	17 February 2025	

=== Out ===
Pos	Player	Transferred to	Fee	Date	Source
GK	(Croatia) Marko Barešić	Free agent	End of contract	7 June 2024	
DF	(Ukraine) Oleksandr Drambayev	(Ukraine) Shakhtar Donetsk	Return from loan	7 June 2024	
DF	(Croatia) Šime Gržan	Free agent	End of contract	7 June 2024	
MF	(Croatia) Petar Brlek	Free agent	End of contract	7 June 2024	
FW	(Slovakia) Ladislav Almási	(Czech Republic) Baník Ostrava	Return from loan	7 June 2024	
DF	(Greece) Stefanos Evangelou	(Hungary) Zalaegerszeg	Free	17 June 2024	
MF	(Albania) Enis Çokaj	(Greece) Panathinaikos	Return from loan	19 June 2024	
DF	(Croatia) Slavko Bralić	(Slovenia) Celje	Free	24 June 2024	
FW	(Montenegro) Nikola Janjić	(Montenegro) Sutjeska Nikšić	Released	6 July 2024	
FW	(Croatia) Vinko Petković	Free agent	Released	10 July 2024	
FW	(Bosnia and Herzegovina) Amar Zahirović	(Croatia) Jarun	Released	22 July 2024	
MF	(Croatia) Marin Prekodravac	(Croatia) Šibenik	Released	5 August 2024	
FW	(Argentina) Ramón Miérez	(United Arab Emirates) Al Jazira	€3,000,000	14 August 2024	
DF	(Portugal) André Duarte	(Hungary) Újpest	€400,000	15 August 2024	
FW	(Croatia) Kristijan Lovrić	(Turkey) Amedspor	Released	22 August 2024	
GK	(Croatia) Franko Kolić	(Slovenia) Mura	Released	31 August 2024	
DF	(Croatia) Luka Zebec	(Croatia) BSK Bijelo Brdo	Loan	31 August 2024	
FW	(Croatia) Kristian Fućak	(Hungary) Zalaegerszeg	Loan	3 September 2024	
MF	(Croatia) Darko Nejašmić	(United Arab Emirates) Sharjah	€1,000,000	5 September 2024	
GK	(Croatia) Nikola Čavlina	(Croatia) Dinamo Zagreb	Recalled from loan	7 January 2025	
FW	(Croatia) Luka Branšteter	(Croatia) Cibalia	Loan	10 January 2025	
FW	(Croatia) Kristian Fućak	(Croatia) Istra 1961	Released	15 January 2025	
FW	(Netherlands) Ricuenio Kewal	Free agent	Released	3 February 2025	
DF	(Croatia) Krešimir Vrbanac	(Croatia) BSK Bijelo Brdo	Loan	12 February 2025	
GK	(Croatia) Tin Sajko	(Croatia) Rudeš	Free	13 February 2025	

▼ Total Spending: €3,050,000

▲ Total Income: €4,400,000

▲ Net Income: €1,350,000

== Competitions ==
=== Overall record ===
Competition	First match	Last match	Starting round	Final position	Record							
Competition	First match	Last match	Starting round	Final position	Pld	W	D	L	GF	GA	GD	Win %
SuperSport HNL	4 August 2024	25 May 2025	Matchday 1	7th	36	11	9	16	46	52	−6	30.56
Croatian Cup	18 September 2024	2 April 2025	First round	Semi-finals	4	3	1	0	6	2	+4	75.00
UEFA Conference League	25 July 2024	15 August 2024	Second qualifying round	Third qualifying round	4	2	2	0	9	4	+5	50.00
Total					44	16	12	16	61	58	+3	36.36

Last updated: 6 July 2025
Source: Soccerway

=== SuperSport HNL ===
==== League table ====
Pos	Team	Pld	W	D	L	GF	GA	GD	Pts	Qualification or relegation (Note: The 2024–25 Croatian Football Cup winners qualify for the Europa League first qualifying round (or the second-placed team if the Croatian Cup winners finish first). If the Croatian Cup winners finish in the top three, the second Conference League second qualifying round spot will be passed to the fourth-placed team.)
5	Slaven Belupo	36	13	9	14	42	45	−3	48	
6	Istra 1961	36	11	15	10	39	42	−3	48	
7	Osijek	36	11	9	16	46	52	−6	42	
8	Lokomotiva	36	10	9	17	45	54	−9	39	
9	Gorica	36	9	10	17	29	51	−22	37	

Source: SuperSport HNL
Rules for classification: 1) Points; 2) Head-to-head points; 3) Head-to-head goal difference; 4) Head-to-head goals scored (at home if two teams tied); 5) Goal difference; 6) Goals scored; 7) Play-off
(Note: Criteria 2-4 and 7 is only used if deciding champion, teams to international competition or teams for relegation and in that case criteria 6 will not be used).

==== Results summary ====
Overall								Home						Away					
Pld	W	D	L	GF	GA	GD	Pts	W	D	L	GF	GA	GD	W	D	L	GF	GA	GD
36	11	9	16	46	52	−6	42	6	6	6	23	21	+2	5	3	10	23	31	−8

Last updated: 6 July 2025.
Source: SuperSport HNL

==== Results by round ====
Round	1	2	3	4	5	6	7	8	9	10	11	12	13	14	15	16	17	18	19	20	21	22	23	24	25	26	27	28	29	30	31	32	33	34	35	36
Ground	H	H	A	H	A	H	A	H	A	A	A	H	A	H	A	H	A	H	H	H	A	H	A	H	A	H	A	A	A	H	A	H	A	H	A	H
Result	L	L	D	L	L	W	W	W	L	W	W	W	D	D	L	W	D	D	D	W	L	L	L	L	L	D	L	L	L	L	W	W	W	D	L	D
Position	7	9	9	9	9	9	6	6	7	5	5	4	4	4	5	5	5	4	4	4	4	4	5	6	7	6	8	8	8	9	8	7	7	7	7	7

Updated to match(es) played on 23 February 2024. Source: SuperSport HNL
A = Away; H = Home; W = Win; D = Draw; L = Loss

==== Matches ====
4 August 2024 1	Osijek	1–2	Šibenik	Osijek
21:00 CEST (UTC+02:00)	Jugović (yellow card) 24'; Soldo 54'	Report	Božić 8'; Kolega (yellow card) 17'; Agyemang 60'; Gačić (yellow card) 90+3'; Đaković (yellow card) 90+4'	Stadium: Opus Arena; Attendance: 6,144; Referee: Patrik Kolarić

11 August 2024 2	Osijek	1–2	Dinamo Zagreb	Osijek
21:00 CEST (UTC+02:00)	Lima 10'; Omerović (yellow card) 50'; Bukvić (yellow card) 66'; Jugović (yellow card) 66'; Mkrtchyan (yellow card) 90+9'	Report	Hoxha 21'; Théophile-Catherine (yellow card) 83'; Ristovski 90+6' (yellow card) 90+6'	Stadium: Opus Arena; Attendance: 9,172; Referee: Duje Strukan

18 August 2024 3	Gorica	2–2	Osijek	Velika Gorica
21:00 CEST (UTC+02:00)	Kapulica 38'; Čaić (yellow card) 62'; Pavlović 82'	Report	Jugović 53', 61'; Matković (yellow card) 59'	Stadium: Stadion Radnik; Attendance: 1,077; Referee: Mario Zebec

25 August 2024 4	Osijek	0–2	Rijeka	Osijek
20:45 CEST (UTC+02:00)		Report	Radeljić 13'; Petrovič (yellow card) 26'; Pašalić 60'	Stadium: Opus Arena; Attendance: 7,014; Referee: Ante Čulina

31 August 2024 5	Hajduk Split	1–0	Osijek	Split
20:45 CEST (UTC+02:00)	Durdov (yellow card) 34'; Livaja 56'; Rakitić (yellow card) 75'; Lučić (yellow card) 82'	Report	Hasić (yellow card) 59'	Stadium: Stadion Poljud; Attendance: 17,137; Referee: Mario Zebec

15 September 2024 6	Osijek	1–0	Slaven Belupo	Osijek
17:30 CEST (UTC+02:00)	Pušić 15'; Jelenić (yellow card) 23'; Hasić (yellow card) 59'	Report	Caimacov (yellow card) 21'; Grgić (yellow card) 41'	Stadium: Opus Arena; Attendance: 3,240; Referee: Toni Dadić

22 September 2024 7	Lokomotiva	0–1	Osijek	Zagreb
17:30 CEST (UTC+02:00)	Leovac (yellow card) 19'; Smakaj (yellow card) 45+2'; Kolinger (yellow card) 59'	Report	Dantas (yellow card) 17'; Pušić (yellow card) 28'; Jurišić 32'; Tuia (yellow card) 56'; Jelenić (yellow card) 73'; Hasić (yellow card) 79'; Soldo (yellow card) 90+6'	Stadium: Stadion Kranjčevićeva; Attendance: 738; Referee: Duje Strukan

29 September 2024 8	Osijek	2–1	Varaždin	Osijek
17:30 CEST (UTC+02:00)	Jakupović 16', 21' (yellow card) 90+5'	Report	Ba (yellow card) 56'; Mamić 89'	Stadium: Opus Arena; Attendance: 3,727; Referee: Igor Pajač

4 October 2024 9	Istra 1961	2–1	Osijek	Pula
18:00 CEST (UTC+02:00)	Jelenić 12', 22' (o.g.); Marešić (yellow card) 58'; Lekweiry (yellow card) 62'	Report	Pušić (yellow card) 34'; Bukvić (yellow card) 58'; Soldo 88'	Stadium: Stadion Aldo Drosina; Attendance: 1,174; Referee: Mateo Erceg

19 October 2024 10	Šibenik	1–3	Osijek	Šibenik
16:00 CEST (UTC+02:00)	Santini 3' (yellow card) 25'; Roca (yellow card) 10'; Đaković (yellow card) 45'; Majić (yellow card) 48'	Report	Hasić (yellow card) 31'; Jurišić (yellow card) 45+1'; Jakupović 45+5'; Jelenić 62'; Omerović (yellow card) 72'; Soldo 81'	Stadium: Stadion Šubićevac; Attendance: 1,100; Referee: Igor Pajač

27 October 2024 11	Dinamo Zagreb	2–4	Osijek	Zagreb
16:00 CET (UTC+01:00)	Pjaca 18', 51'; Mišić (yellow card) 21'; Bernauer (yellow card) 75'; Kulenović (yellow card) 76'	Report	Jakupović 22', 89' (pen.); Jurišić 40'; Fortes 53'; Omerović (yellow card) 73'	Stadium: Stadion Maksimir; Attendance: 13,477; Referee: Patrik Kolarić

2 November 2024 12	Osijek	2–0	Gorica	Osijek
17:30 CET (UTC+01:00)	Jelenić (yellow card) 27'; Jugović (yellow card) 33'; Leš 34' (o.g.); Tuia (yellow card) 40'; Soldo (yellow card) 58'; Jakupović (yellow card) 87'; Pušić 90'	Report	Mikanović (yellow card) 58'; Pavlović (yellow card) 83'	Stadium: Opus Arena; Attendance: 6,875; Referee: Ante Terzić

10 November 2024 13	Rijeka	1–1	Osijek	Rijeka
17:45 CET (UTC+01:00)	Fruk 51'; Gojak (yellow card) 83'; Smolčić (yellow card) 90+2'; Zlomislić (yellow card) 90+5'	Report	Cvijanović (yellow card) 56'; Hasić 90+5'	Stadium: Stadion Rujevica; Attendance: 5,106; Referee: Igor Pajač

24 November 2024 14	Osijek	2–2	Hajduk Split	Osijek
15:00 CET (UTC+01:00)	Jelenić 41'; Jurišić (yellow card) 45+1'; Jakupović 58'; Jugović (yellow card) 86'; Matković (yellow card) 90+8'	Report	Livaja 9'; Šarlija (yellow card) 27'; Kalik (yellow card) 38'; Uremović 84'	Stadium: Opus Arena; Attendance: 11,532; Referee: Ante Čulina

30 November 2024 15	Slaven Belupo	3–2	Osijek	Koprivnica
15:00 CET (UTC+01:00)	Lučić 36'; Grgić 57'; Božić 73'; Lepinjica (yellow card) 81'; Šuto (yellow card) 90+2'; Sušak (yellow card) 90+6'	Report	Lima (yellow card) 45'; Dantas 45+2'; Fortes 55'; Tuia (yellow card) 67'; Jelenić (yellow card) 74'	Stadium: Gradski stadion Attendance: 1,216; Referee: Toni Dadić

8 December 2024 16	Osijek	3–0	Lokomotiva	Osijek
17:30 CET (UTC+01:00)	Hasić 2'; Soldo 32'; Dantas (yellow card) 45+4'; Omerović (yellow card) 54'; Cvijanović 56'; Jurišić (yellow card) 68'	Report	Fetai (yellow card) 1'; Goričan (yellow card) 22'; Antolić (yellow card) 28'; Vrbančić (yellow card) 28'; Leovac (yellow card) 39'; Mersinaj (yellow card) 78'	Stadium: Opus Arena; Attendance: 6,052; Referee: Duje Strukan

15 December 2024 17	Varaždin	0–0	Osijek	Varaždin
15:00 CET (UTC+01:00)	Marina (yellow card) 30'; Mitrovski (yellow card) 61'	Report	Hasić (yellow card) 30'; Dantas (yellow card) 36'; Jelenić (yellow card) 69'	Stadium: Stadion Varteks; Attendance: 1,434; Referee: Igor Pajač

20 December 2024 18	Osijek	2–2	Istra 1961	Osijek
18:00 CET (UTC+01:00)	Jugović (yellow card) 54'; Živković 64'; Lima 66'; Tuia (yellow card) 75'	Report	Lekweiry 38'; Gagua 59'; Valinčić (yellow card) 88'	Stadium: Opus Arena; Attendance: 3,889; Referee: Antonio Melnjak

24 January 2025 19	Osijek	2–2	Šibenik	Osijek
18:00 CET (UTC+01:00)	Jakupović 25', 34'	Report	Santini 9' (yellow card) 90+5'; Punčec (yellow card) 17' (yellow-red card) 70'; Prekodravac (yellow card) 34'; Gržan (yellow card) 35'; Laća 59'; Đaković (yellow card) 90'	Stadium: Opus Arena; Attendance: 3,463; Referee: Ante Terzić

2 February 2025 20	Osijek	2–1	Dinamo Zagreb	Osijek
15:00 CET (UTC+01:00)	Omerović 2'; Jakupović (yellow card) 6'; Soldo 60'; Jurišić (yellow card) 90+5'	Report	Stojković 57'; Théophile-Catherine (yellow card) 60'	Stadium: Opus Arena; Attendance: 9,453; Referee: Igor Pajač

8 February 2025 21	Gorica	1–0	Osijek	Velika Gorica
15:00 CET (UTC+01:00)	Pajaziti (yellow card) 31'; Krizmanić (yellow card) 38'; Mikanović 67' (yellow card) 90+4'	Report	Babec (yellow card) 31'; Matković (yellow card) 55'; Soldo (yellow card) 66'; Jugović (yellow card) 83'	Stadium: Stadion Radnik; Attendance: 783; Referee: Antonio Melnjak

16 February 2025 22	Osijek	0–2	Rijeka	Osijek
17:45 CET (UTC+01:00)	Babec (yellow card) 24'; Tuia (yellow card) 80'	Report	Čop 15'; Bogojević (yellow card) 26'; Janković 37'	Stadium: Opus Arena; Attendance: 4,780; Referee: Mateo Erceg

22 February 2025 23	Hajduk Split	4–0	Osijek	Split
15:00 CET (UTC+01:00)	Uremović 11'; Livaja 19', 24'; Diallo (yellow card) 53'; Durdov (yellow card) 55'; Biuk 89'	Report	Guedes (yellow card) 44'; Živković (yellow card) 54'	Stadium: Stadion Poljud; Attendance: 17,451; Referee: Ante Čulina

1 March 2025 24	Osijek	1–2	Slaven Belupo	Osijek
17:30 CET (UTC+01:00)	Pušić 25'; Jakupović (yellow card) 72'	Report	Šuto 78'; Jagušić 85' (yellow card) 85'	Stadium: Opus Arena; Attendance: 3,885; Referee: Igor Pajač

8 March 2025 25	Lokomotiva	3–0	Osijek	Zagreb
17:30 CET (UTC+01:00)	Dajčer 22'; Vrbančić 82'; Andrić 90+5'	Report	Jugović (red card) 45+2'; Tuia (yellow card) 50'; Jelenić (yellow card) 69'; Omerović (yellow card) 86'	Stadium: Stadion Kranjčevićeva; Attendance: 913; Referee: Antonio Melnjak

16 March 2025 26	Osijek	0–0	Varaždin	Osijek
15:00 CET (UTC+01:00)	Omerović (yellow card) 40'	Report	Ba (yellow card) 28'; Marina (yellow card) 74'	Stadium: Opus Arena; Attendance: 2,674; Referee: Mateo Erceg

29 March 2025 27	Istra 1961	2–1	Osijek	Pula
16:00 CET (UTC+01:00)	Lawal 45'; Heister (yellow card) 87'; Rozić 90+3'; Maurić (yellow card) 90+7'	Report	Cvijanović (yellow card) 14'; Mersinaj (yellow card) 27'; Ohajunwa (yellow card) 45+2'; Fortes 68'; Ademi (yellow card) 90+4'; Mikolčić (yellow card) 90+4'; Pušić (yellow card) 90+2' (yellow-red card) 90+7'	Stadium: Stadion Aldo Drosina; Attendance: 1,620; Referee: Duje Strukan

6 April 2025 28	Šibenik	4–1	Osijek	Šibenik
18:45 CEST (UTC+02:00)	Santini 21' (pen.), 61' (yellow card) 53'; Gržan 41', 79'; Perić (yellow card) 62'	Report	Mersinaj 75'	Stadium: Stadion Šubićevac; Attendance: 507; Referee: Ante Terzić

12 April 2025 29	Dinamo Zagreb	2–0	Osijek	Zagreb
18:45 CEST (UTC+02:00)	Sučić 22'; Stojković (yellow card) 37'; Baturina (yellow card) 42'; Ademi 70'	Report	Mersinaj (yellow card) 38'; Dantas (yellow card) 42'	Stadium: Stadion Maksimir; Attendance: 7,497; Referee: Patrik Kolarić

19 April 2025 30	Osijek	0–1	Gorica	Osijek
16:00 CEST (UTC+02:00)	Jurišić (yellow card) 27'; Dantas (yellow card) 60'; Bukvić (yellow card) 87'	Report	Pajaziti 30'; Sikošek (yellow card) 89'	Stadium: Opus Arena; Attendance: 3,622; Referee: Duje Strukan

23 April 2025 31	Rijeka	0–2	Osijek	Rijeka
20:00 CEST (UTC+02:00)	Manev (yellow card) 5'; Oreč (yellow card) 49'	Report	Jakupović (yellow card) 20'; Omerović 32'; Soldo 53'; Lima (yellow card) 90+5'	Stadium: Stadion Rujevica; Attendance: 5,704; Referee: Ante Čulina

27 April 2025 32	Osijek	2–0	Hajduk Split	Osijek
16:00 CEST (UTC+02:00)	Babec 71'; Jakupović 90+4'; Dantas (yellow card) 90+4'	Report	Brajković (yellow card) 24' (yellow-red card) 30'; Sanyang (yellow card) 27'	Stadium: Opus Arena; Attendance: 9,672; Referee: Igor Pajač

4 May 2025 33	Slaven Belupo	1–4	Osijek	Koprivnica
16:00 CEST (UTC+02:00)	Lučić (yellow card) 45+5'; Dolček 54'; Bosec (yellow card) 71'	Report	Omerović 25', 31' (yellow card) 71'; Fortes 43'; Jurišić 59'	Stadium: Gradski stadion Attendance: 1,212; Referee: Ivan Vukančić

9 May 2025 34	Osijek	1–1	Lokomotiva	Osijek
18:00 CEST (UTC+02:00)	Babec 11'; Mersinaj (yellow card) 19'	Report	Smakaj (yellow card) 25'; Živković (yellow card) 41'; Dajčer (yellow card) 72'; Pajač (yellow card) 87'; Sušak 90'; Katić (yellow card) 90+3'; Šubarić (yellow card) 90+4'	Stadium: Opus Arena; Attendance: 4,076; Referee: Ante Terzić

17 May 2025 35	Varaždin	2–1	Osijek	Varaždin
17:00 CEST (UTC+02:00)	Mitrovski 22'; Vuk 28'; Zelenika (yellow card) 90+4'	Report	Fortes 9'; Omerović (yellow card) 86'	Stadium: Stadion Varteks; Attendance: 1,698; Referee: Patrik Pavlešić

25 May 2025 36	Osijek	1–1	Istra 1961	Osijek
17:00 CEST (UTC+02:00)	Fortes 55'; Farkaš (yellow card) 65'	Report	Marešić 37' (pen.); Keller (yellow card) 80'; Blagojević (yellow card) 90+2'	Stadium: Opus Arena; Attendance: 4,024; Referee: Ante Terzić

=== Croatian Cup ===
18 September 2024 First round	Varteks	1–3	Osijek	Varaždin
16:30 CEST (UTC+02:00)	Katanec (yellow card) 13'; Kovačec (yellow card) 50'; Glavica 77'; Kukec (yellow card) 90+3'	Report	Bukvić (yellow card) 3'; Soldo 9' (yellow card) 89'; Jakupović 61'; Lima 73'	Stadium: SC Sloboda; Attendance: 2,473; Referee: Filip Dragašević

22 October 2024 Second round	Slavonija Požega	1–2	Osijek	Velika
17:00 CEST (UTC+02:00)	Šubara (yellow card) 36'; Janković 62'	Report	Omerović (yellow card) 37'; Živković 84'; Soldo 85'	Stadium: Stadion Kamen Ingrad; Attendance: 1,600; Referee: Toni Dadić

26 February 2025 Quarter-finals	Dinamo Zagreb	0–1	Osijek	Zagreb
19:45 CET (UTC+01:00)	Sučić (yellow card) 42'; Théophile-Catherine (yellow card) 62'	Report	Babec 22'; Omerović (yellow card) 38'; Cvijanović (yellow card) 64'; Jelenić (yellow card) 76'; Tuia (yellow card) 82'; Jugović (yellow card) 88'	Stadium: Stadion Maksimir; Attendance: 4,276; Referee: Duje Strukan

2 April 2025 Semi-finals	Slaven Belupo	0–0 (4–3 p)	Osijek	Koprivnica
17:00 CEST (UTC+02:00)	Šuto (yellow card) 73'; Nestorovski (yellow card) 85'; Božić (yellow card) 112'; Lepinjica (yellow card) 117'	Report	Jelenić (yellow card) 85'; Fortes (yellow card) 105'; Ademi (yellow card) 107'; Babec (yellow card) 112'	Stadium: Gradski stadion Attendance: 2,787; Referee: Patrik Kolarić
	Penalties
	Nestorovski (penalty scored); Šuto (penalty missed); Lepinjica (penalty scored); Caimacov (penalty scored); Boras (penalty scored)		Dantas (penalty scored); Lima (penalty scored); Omerović (penalty scored); Soldo (penalty missed); Fortes (penalty missed)

=== UEFA Europa Conference League ===
==== Second qualifying round ====
25 July 2024 First leg	Osijek (Croatia)	5–1	(Estonia) FCI Levadia	Osijek, Croatia
20:00 CEST (UTC+02:00)	Miérez 9', 18', 27'; Mkrtchyan (yellow card) 29'; Guedes 34'; Bukvić 68'	Report	Pedro (yellow card) 6'; Yakovlev 8'	Stadium: Opus Arena; Attendance: 8,028; Referee: Jacob Karlsen (Denmark)

1 August 2024 Second leg	FCI Levadia (Estonia)	0–1 (1–6 agg.)	(Croatia) Osijek	Tallinn, Estonia
19:00 EEST (UTC+03:00)	Mavretič (yellow card) 27'; Pedro (yellow card) 39'	Report	Guedes (yellow card) 59'; Pušić 63'	Stadium: Lilleküla Stadium; Attendance: 896; Referee: Menelaos Antoniou (Cyprus)

==== Third qualifying round ====
8 August 2024 First leg	Osijek (Croatia)	1–1	(Azerbaijan) Zira	Osijek, Croatia
20:00 CEST (UTC+02:00)	Pušić (yellow card) 37'; Matković 38'; Ademi (yellow card) 74'; Čavlina (yellow card) 85'; Mikolčić (yellow card) 90+5'	Report	Hajili (yellow card) 2'; Nuriyev (yellow card) 34'; Ibrahimli (yellow card) 57'; Utzig 90+4' (pen.)	Stadium: Opus Arena; Attendance: 6,432; Referee: Aristotelis Diamantopoulos (Greece)

15 August 2024 Second leg	Zira (Azerbaijan)	2–2 (a.e.t.) (3–3 agg.) (2–1 p)	(Croatia) Osijek	Baku, Azerbaijan
20:30 AZT (UTC+04:00)	Júnior (yellow card) 29'; Alıyev 54' (pen.); Volkovi (yellow card) 80' (goal) 90'	Report	Soldo (yellow card) 22'; Jugović 37' (yellow card) 37'; Omerović (yellow card) 78'; Matković 81'; Pušić (yellow card) 90'; Malenica (yellow card) 90+4'; Ademi (yellow card) 109'; Jurišić (yellow card) 111'	Stadium: Dalga Arena; Attendance: 4,000; Referee: Julian Weinberger (Austria)
	Penalties
	Alıyev (penalty missed); Renato (penalty scored); Nuriyev (penalty missed); Isayev (penalty missed); Utzig (penalty scored)		(penalty missed) Pušić; (penalty scored) Nejašmić; (penalty missed) Ademi; (penalty missed) Lima; (penalty missed) Mikolčić

=== Friendlies ===
==== Pre-season ====
29 June 2024 Friendly	Osijek	13–0	Bilje	Osijek
15:00 CEST (UTC+02:00)	Pušić 3', 18', 43'; Soldo 7'; Jelenić 14'; Kewal 60'; Lima 63', 72'; Jugović 67'; Živković 74', 81'; Mikolčić 84'; Farkaš 85'	Report		Stadium: Opus Arena

3 July 2024 Friendly	Osijek (Croatia)	1–0	(Czech Republic) Jablonec	Irschen, Austria
18:00 CEST (UTC+02:00)	Matković (yellow card) 69'; Mikolčić 79'	Report		Stadium: Sportplatz Irschen

7 July 2024 Friendly	Osijek (Croatia)	2–2	(Hungary) Nyíregyháza	Bad Kleinkirchheim, Austria
17:00 CEST (UTC+02:00)	Jugović 10'; Jurišić (yellow card) 17'; Omerović 65'	Report	Gresó 54'; Beke 87'	Stadium: Sportarena Bad Kleinkirchheim

10 July 2024 Friendly	Bad Kleinhkirchheim (Austria)	0–16 (Note: The game was played with 40 minute halves.)	(Croatia) Osijek	Bad Kleinkirchheim, Austria
18:00 CEST (UTC+02:00)		Report	Bukvić 2' 30'; Lima 14'; Mikolčić 16'; Soldo 32'; Prekodravac 34'; (o.g.); Pušić 80'; Miérez; Kewal; Jugović; Nejašmić	Stadium: Sportarena Bad Kleinkirchheim

13 July 2024 Friendly	Osijek (Croatia)	3–1	(Ukraine) Rukh Lviv	Radomlje, Slovenia
15:00 CEST (UTC+02:00)	Miérez 5'; Pušić 39', 66'	Report	Soldo 63' (o.g.)	Stadium: Sports park Radomlje

18 July 2024 Friendly	DAC Dunajská Streda (Slovakia)	3–2	(Croatia) Osijek	Dunajská Streda, Slovakia
18:00 CEST (UTC+02:00)	Redzic 7'; Bernát 74'; Almási 90'	Report	Matković 25'; Pušić 78'	Stadium: MOL Aréna

==== On-season (2024) ====
6 September 2024 Friendly	Bilje	1–4 (Note: The game was played until 70th minute.)	Osijek	Bilje
18:00 CEST (UTC+02:00)	Lazar 58' (pen.)	Report	Jugović 6'; Lima 25'; Grgić 58'; Dantas 70'	Stadium: ŠRC Ivica Ranogajec-Beli; Attendance: 400

11 October 2024 Friendly	Osijek (Croatia)	2–0	(Hungary) Kozármisleny	Osijek, Croatia
15:00 CEST (UTC+02:00)	Lima 42'; Fortes 46'	Report		Stadium: Opus Arena (training ground); Attendance: 0

==== Mid-season ====
9 January 2025 Friendly	Osijek	4–4	Opatija	Novigrad
15:00 CET (UTC+01:00)	Jakupović 10', 34' (pen.); Matković 40'; Fortes 69'	Report	Ajayi 4'; Kožić 12'; Pejanović 18'; Weitzer 67'	Stadium: Football center Novigrad; Attendance: 0 Referee: Goran Krneta

14 January 2025 Friendly	Osijek (Croatia)	2–1	(Slovenia) Domžale	Buje, Croatia
12:00 CET (UTC+01:00)	Jurišić 22'; Matković 55'	Report	Kranjčič 87'	Stadium: Gradski stadion

15 January 2025 Friendly	Osijek	2–0	Orijent	Novigrad
11:00 CET (UTC+01:00)	Omerović 23'; Lima 38'	Report		Stadium: Football center Novigrad

18 January 2025 Friendly	Osijek (Croatia)	2–2	(Slovenia) Celje	Umag, Croatia
11:30 CET (UTC+01:00)	Vrbanac 6'; Jakupović 56'	Report	Kvesić 45+1'; Sešlar 60'	Stadium: Stella Maris sports center

==== On-season (2025) ====
13 March 2025 Friendly	Osijek	6–1	Darda	Osijek
	Mikolčić 20'; Ohajunwa 48', 70'; Dantas 55'; Živković 65', 65'	Report	Dubravac 63'	Stadium: Opus Arena; Attendance: 0

20 March 2025 Friendly	Tomislav Livana	0–5	Osijek	Livana
		Report	Jugović 41'; Dabić 48'; Babec 60'; Omerović 62'; Periša 81' (o.g.)	Stadium: ŠRC Kralj Tomislav

== Player seasonal records ==
Updated 10 July 2025

=== Goals ===
Rank	Name	League	Europe	Cup	Total
1	(Austria) Arnel Jakupović	9	–	1	10
2	(Croatia) Marko Soldo	6	–	2	8
3	(Portugal) Hernâni Fortes	6	–	–	6
4	(Bosnia and Herzegovina) Nail Omerović	4	–	–	4
4	(Switzerland) Petar Pušić	3	1	–	4
6	(Croatia) Roko Jurišić	3	–	–	3
6	(Croatia) Vedran Jugović	2	1	–	3
6	(Croatia) Hrvoje Babec	2	–	1	1
6	(Brazil) Pedro Lima	2	–	1	3
6	(Argentina) Ramón Miérez	–	3	–	3
11	(Sweden) Emin Hasić	2	–	–	2
11	(Croatia) Luka Jelenić	2	–	–	2
11	(Croatia) Filip Živković	1	–	1	2
11	(Croatia) Anton Matković	–	2	–	2
15	(Croatia) Ivan Cvijanović	1	–	–	1
15	(Portugal) Tiago Dantas	1	–	–	1
15	(Albania) Jon Mersinaj	1	–	–	1
15	(Croatia) Domagoj Bukvić	–	1	–	1
15	(Brazil) Renan Guedes	–	1	–	1
Own goals		1	–	–	1
TOTALS		46	9	6	61

Source: Competitive matches

=== Clean sheets ===
Rank	Name	League	Europe	Cup	Total
1	(Croatia) Marko Malenica	8	–	2	10
2	(Croatia) Nikola Čavlina	–	1	–	1
TOTALS		8	1	2	11

Source: Competitive matches

=== Disciplinary record ===
Number	Position	Player	HNL			Europe			Croatian Cup			Total		
Number	Position	Player	Yellow card	(yellow card) (yellow-red card)	Red card	Yellow card	(yellow card) (yellow-red card)	Red card	Yellow card	(yellow card) (yellow-red card)	Red card	Yellow card	(yellow card) (yellow-red card)	Red card
1	GK	(Croatia) Nikola Čavlina	0	0	0	1	0	0	0	0	0	1	0	0
5	DF	(Armenia) Styopa Mkrtchyan	1	0	0	1	0	0	0	0	0	2	0	0
6	MF	(Croatia) Hrvoje Babec	2	0	0	0	0	0	1	0	0	3	0	0
7	MF	(Croatia) Vedran Jugović	7	0	1	1	0	0	1	0	0	9	0	1
8	FW	(Nigeria) Justice Ohajunwa	1	0	0	0	0	0	0	0	0	1	0	0
9	FW	(Switzerland) Kemal Ademi	1	0	0	2	0	0	1	0	0	4	0	0
10	MF	(Brazil) Pedro Lima	2	0	0	0	0	0	0	0	0	2	0	0
13	DF	(Italy) Alessandro Tuia	6	0	0	0	0	0	1	0	0	7	0	0
14	MF	(Croatia) Marko Soldo	3	0	0	1	0	0	1	0	0	5	0	0
15	DF	(Albania) Jon Mersinaj	3	0	0	0	0	0	0	0	0	3	0	0
17	FW	(Austria) Arnel Jakupović	5	0	0	0	0	0	0	0	0	5	0	0
18	MF	(Croatia) Niko Farkaš	1	0	0	0	0	0	0	0	0	1	0	0
20	MF	(Portugal) Tiago Dantas	6	0	0	0	0	0	0	0	0	6	0	0
22	DF	(Croatia) Roko Jurišić	5	0	0	1	0	0	0	0	0	6	0	0
24	FW	(Croatia) Filip Živković	1	0	0	0	0	0	0	0	0	1	0	0
26	DF	(Croatia) Luka Jelenić	6	0	0	0	0	0	2	0	0	8	0	0
27	FW	(Portugal) Hernâni Fortes	0	0	0	0	0	0	1	0	0	1	0	0
31	GK	(Croatia) Marko Malenica	0	0	0	1	0	0	0	0	0	1	0	0
33	DF	(Sweden) Emin Hasić	5	0	0	0	0	0	0	0	0	5	0	0
34	FW	(Croatia) Anton Matković	3	0	0	0	0	0	0	0	0	3	0	0
36	MF	(Bosnia and Herzegovina) Nail Omerović	8	0	0	1	0	0	2	0	0	11	0	0
39	FW	(Croatia) Domagoj Bukvić	3	0	0	0	0	0	1	0	0	4	0	0
42	DF	(Brazil) Renan Guedes	1	0	0	1	0	0	0	0	0	2	0	0
55	DF	(Croatia) Ivan Cvijanović	2	0	0	0	0	0	1	0	0	3	0	0
66	MF	(Switzerland) Petar Pušić	2	1	0	2	0	0	0	0	0	4	1	0
98	MF	(Croatia) Šimun Mikolčić	1	0	0	1	0	0	0	0	0	2	0	0
TOTALS			75	1	1	13	0	0	12	0	0	100	1	1

=== Appearances and goals ===
Number	Position	Player	Apps	Goals	Apps	Goals	Apps	Goals	Apps	Goals
Number	Position	Player	Total		HNL (Note: First number represents appearances in starting eleven, while the second number indicates a substitute appearance.)		Conference League		Croatian Cup	
1	GK	(Croatia) Nikola Čavlina	9	0	4+0	0	4+0	0	1+0	0
3	DF	(Portugal) André Duarte	4	0	1+0	0	1+2	0	0+0	0
4	DF	(Croatia) Krešimir Vrbanac	3	0	0+1	0	0+1	0	0+1	0
5	DF	(Armenia) Styopa Mkrtchyan	20	0	13+4	0	2+0	0	0+1	0
6	MF	(Croatia) Hrvoje Babec	20	3	18+0	2	0+0	0	2+0	1
6	MF	(Croatia) Darko Nejašmić	8	0	4+0	0	4+0	0	0+0	0
7	MF	(Croatia) Vedran Jugović	37	3	19+11	2	3+1	1	0+3	0
8	FW	(Nigeria) Justice Ohajunwa	6	0	1+5	0	0+0	0	0+0	0
9	FW	(Switzerland) Kemal Ademi	16	0	3+8	0	2+1	0	1+1	0
10	MF	(Brazil) Pedro Lima	34	3	8+18	2	1+3	0	1+3	1
11	FW	(Netherlands) Ricuenio Kewal	2	0	0+2	0	0+0	0	0+0	0
13	FW	(Argentina) Ramón Miérez	3	3	1+0	0	2+0	3	0+0	0
13	DF	(Italy) Alessandro Tuia	19	0	18+0	0	0+0	0	1+0	0
14	MF	(Croatia) Marko Soldo	43	8	26+9	6	3+1	0	3+1	2
15	DF	(Albania) Jon Mersinaj	9	1	7+1	1	0+0	0	1+0	0
17	FW	(Austria) Arnel Jakupović	31	10	26+1	9	0+0	0	4+0	1
18	MF	(Croatia) Niko Farkaš	3	0	0+3	0	0+0	0	0+0	0
20	MF	(Portugal) Tiago Dantas	30	1	23+4	1	0+0	0	1+2	0
22	DF	(Croatia) Roko Jurišić	39	3	32+1	3	4+0	0	2+0	0
24	FW	(Croatia) Filip Živković	20	2	0+18	1	0+0	0	0+2	1
26	DF	(Croatia) Luka Jelenić	40	2	29+3	2	4+0	0	4+0	0
27	FW	(Portugal) Hernâni Fortes	27	6	14+10	6	0+0	0	1+2	0
31	GK	(Croatia) Marko Malenica	35	0	32+0	0	0+0	0	3+0	0
33	DF	(Sweden) Emin Hasić	17	2	15+0	2	0+0	0	2+0	0
34	FW	(Croatia) Anton Matković	19	2	12+3	0	3+1	2	0+0	0
36	MF	(Bosnia and Herzegovina) Nail Omerović	41	4	27+7	4	2+1	0	4+0	0
39	FW	(Croatia) Domagoj Bukvić	37	1	15+15	0	3+1	1	3+0	0
42	DF	(Brazil) Renan Guedes	19	1	14+1	0	2+0	1	2+0	0
46	FW	(Croatia) Ivan Barić	2	0	0+1	0	0+0	0	0+1	0
55	DF	(Croatia) Ivan Cvijanović	23	1	11+8	1	0+1	0	2+1	0
66	MF	(Switzerland) Petar Pušić	34	4	17+10	3	4+0	1	3+0	0
98	MF	(Croatia) Šimun Mikolčić	26	0	6+13	0	0+4	0	3+0	0
