= 2024–25 HNK Rijeka season =

Rijeka
2024–25 season
- President: Damir Mišković
- Head coach: Željko Sopić (until 13 August 2024); Radomir Đalović (since 13 August 2024)
- Stadium: Rujevica
- HNL: 1st
- Croatian Cup: Winners
- UEFA Europa League: Third qualifying round
- UEFA Conference League: Play-off round
- Top goalscorer: League: Toni Fruk (11); All: Toni Fruk (15)
- Highest home attendance: 8,187 v. Slaven Belupo (25 May 2025)
- Lowest home attendance: 3,172 v. Lokomotiva (26 January 2025)
- Average home league attendance: 5,372
- Biggest win: 4–0 v Lokomotiva (4 August 2024); 4–0 v Istra 1961 (18 August 2024); 4–0 v Dinamo Zagreb (22 February 2025)
- Biggest defeat: 0–5 v (Slovenia) Olimpija Ljubljana (29 August 2024)
| Home colours | Away colours |

The 2024–25 season was the 79th season in the existence of HNK Rijeka and the club's 34th consecutive season in the top flight of Croatian football. In addition to the domestic league, Rijeka competed in this season's editions of the Croatian Cup, the UEFA Europa League and the UEFA Conference League.

== Season overview ==
=== European qualifying and managerial change ===
Rijeka began their competitive season in the second qualifying round of the 2024–25 UEFA Europa League. After drawing 0–0 away to Corvinul Hunedoara, Rijeka won the return match 1–0 through a goal from Dejan Petrovič, progressing by the same aggregate score. Three days later, they opened their league campaign with a 4–0 home victory over Lokomotiva Zagreb.

On 13 August, head coach Željko Sopić was dismissed despite the team remaining unbeaten through its opening five competitive matches. Assistant coach and former Rijeka player Radomir Đalović was appointed as his replacement, taking charge of a senior team independently for the first time.

Đalović's first match ended in a 2–0 defeat away to Elfsborg, eliminating Rijeka from the Europa League 3–1 on aggregate. The club consequently entered the Conference League play-off round, drawing 1–1 with Olimpija Ljubljana at Rujevica before losing the return match 5–0 in Ljubljana. The 6–1 aggregate defeat brought Rijeka's European campaign to an end on 29 August.

=== Unbeaten autumn and title race ===
Rijeka remained unbeaten during the first half of the league season. They recorded nine victories and nine draws in their opening 18 matches, scoring 26 goals and conceding seven. A 2–0 victory over Slaven Belupo on 22 December ensured that Rijeka entered the winter break at the top of the table with 36 points.

The unbeaten league run ended with a 1–0 defeat at Varaždin on 1 February 2025. Rijeka responded later that month with three consecutive away or high-profile victories: 2–0 against Osijek, 4–0 against defending champions Dinamo Zagreb and 3–1 against Hajduk Split in the Croatian Cup quarter-final. The victory over Dinamo returned Rijeka to the top of the league, while Toni Fruk scored twice in the cup victory at Poljud.

Rijeka subsequently defeated Hajduk 3–0 in the league and reached the Croatian Cup final by beating Istra 1961 1–0 through Fruk's 86th-minute goal. Their league form became less consistent during the run-in, including three successive defeats without scoring against Istra 1961, Osijek and Dinamo in April. Nevertheless, results elsewhere allowed Rijeka to remain in contention during a closely contested three-team title race.

=== Domestic double ===
Rijeka entered the final league match level with Dinamo on 62 points, while Hajduk remained two points behind. Because Rijeka held the superior head-to-head record against Dinamo, victory over Slaven Belupo at Rujevica would guarantee the championship. Goals from Niko Janković and Fruk secured a 2–0 win and Rijeka's second Croatian league title. They finished level with Dinamo on 65 points but were placed first on the head-to-head tiebreaker.

Four days later, Rijeka completed their second domestic double. Following a 1–1 draw away to Slaven Belupo in the first leg of the Croatian Cup final, Nais Djouahra scored the only goal of the return match at Rujevica. The 2–1 aggregate victory gave Rijeka their seventh Croatian Cup and their first league-and-cup double since 2016–17.

== Competitions ==
=== Overall ===
| Competition | First match | Last match | Starting round | Final position | Record | | | | | | | |
| Competition | First match | Last match | Starting round | Final position | Pld | W | D | L | GF | GA | GD | Win % |
|---|---|---|---|---|---|---|---|---|---|---|---|---|
| SuperSport HNL | 4 August 2024 | 25 May 2025 | Matchday 1 | Winners | 36 | 18 | 11 | 7 | 49 | 21 | +28 | 50.00 |
| Croatian Cup | 18 September 2024 | 29 May 2025 | First round | Winners | 6 | 5 | 1 | 0 | 12 | 3 | +9 | 83.33 |
| UEFA Europa League | 25 July 2024 | 15 August 2024 | Second qualifying round | Third qualifying round | 4 | 1 | 2 | 1 | 2 | 3 | −1 | 25.00 |
| UEFA Conference League | 22 August 2024 | 29 August 2024 | Play-off round | Play-off round | 2 | 0 | 1 | 1 | 1 | 6 | −5 | 0.00 |
| Total | | | | | 48 | 24 | 15 | 9 | 64 | 33 | +31 | 50.00 |

Last updated: 29 May 2025
Source: Soccerway

=== SuperSport HNL ===
==== League table ====
| Pos | Team | Pld | W | D | L | GF | GA | GD | Pts | Qualification or relegation (Note: The 2024–25 Croatian Football Cup winners qualify for the Europa League first qualifying round (or the second-placed team if the Croatian Cup winners finish first). If the Croatian Cup winners finish in the top three, the second Conference League second qualifying round spot will be passed to the fourth-placed team.) |
|---|---|---|---|---|---|---|---|---|---|---|
| 1 | Rijeka (C) | 36 | 18 | 11 | 7 | 49 | 21 | +28 | 65 (Note: Head to head points (GD) = Rijeka 5 (+3), Dinamo Zagreb 5 (-3).) | Qualification to Champions League second qualifying round |
| 2 | Dinamo Zagreb | 36 | 19 | 8 | 9 | 69 | 41 | +28 | 65 | Qualification to Europa League league phase |
| 3 | Hajduk Split | 36 | 17 | 12 | 7 | 49 | 34 | +15 | 63 | Qualification to Conference League second qualifying round |
| 4 | Varaždin | 36 | 11 | 16 | 9 | 28 | 24 | +4 | 49 | Qualification to Conference League second qualifying round |
| 5 | Slaven Belupo | 36 | 13 | 9 | 14 | 42 | 45 | −3 | 48 | |

Source: SuperSport HNL
Rules for classification: 1) Points; 2) Head-to-head points; 3) Head-to-head goal difference; 4) Head-to-head goals scored (at home if two teams tied); 5) Goal difference; 6) Goals scored; 7) Play-off
(Note: Criteria 2-4 and 7 is only used if deciding champion, teams to international competition or teams for relegation and in that case criteria 6 will not be used).
(C) Champions

==== Results summary ====
| Overall | | | | | | | | Home | | | | | | Away | | | | | |
| Pld | W | D | L | GF | GA | GD | Pts | W | D | L | GF | GA | GD | W | D | L | GF | GA | GD |
|---|---|---|---|---|---|---|---|---|---|---|---|---|---|---|---|---|---|---|---|
| 36 | 18 | 11 | 7 | 49 | 21 | +28 | 65 | 11 | 5 | 2 | 34 | 9 | +25 | 7 | 6 | 5 | 15 | 12 | +3 |

Last updated: 25 May 2025.
Source: SuperSport HNL

==== Results by round ====
| Round | 1 | 2 | 3 | 4 | 5 | 6 | 7 | 8 | 9 | 10 | 11 | 12 | 13 | 14 | 15 | 16 | 17 | 18 | 19 | 20 | 21 | 22 | 23 | 24 | 25 | 26 | 27 | 28 | 29 | 30 | 31 | 32 | 33 | 34 | 35 | 36 |
|---|---|---|---|---|---|---|---|---|---|---|---|---|---|---|---|---|---|---|---|---|---|---|---|---|---|---|---|---|---|---|---|---|---|---|---|---|
| Ground | H | A | H | A | H | A | H | H | A | A | H | A | H | A | H | A | A | H | H | A | H | A | H | A | H | H | A | A | H | A | H | A | H | A | A | H |
| Result | W | D | W | W | D | W | W | D | D | D | D | W | D | D | W | W | D | W | W | L | L | W | W | D | D | W | L | W | W | L | L | L | W | W | L | W |
| Position | 2 | 3 | 2 | 2 | 2 | 1 | 1 | 1 | 2 | 2 | 2 | 2 | 2 | 2 | 2 | 1 | 1 | 1 | 1 | 1 | 2 | 1 | 1 | 1 | 2 | 1 | 2 | 2 | 1 | 1 | 1 | 1 | 1 | 1 | 1 | 1 |

Updated to match(es) played on 25 May 2025. Source: SuperSport HNL
A = Away; H = Home; W = Win; D = Draw; L = Loss

=== Results by opponent ===
| Team | Results | | | | Points |
| Team | 1 | 2 | 3 | 4 | Points |
|---|---|---|---|---|---|
| Dinamo Zagreb | 1–1 | 0–0 | 4–0 | 0–1 | 5 |
| Gorica | 1–0 | 1–0 | 0–0 | 2–1 | 10 |
| Hajduk Split | 0–0 | 2–2 | 3–0 | 1–2 | 5 |
| Istra 1961 | 4–0 | 1–0 | 0–1 | 0–2 | 6 |
| Lokomotiva | 4–0 | 2–2 | 4–1 | 1–0 | 10 |
| Osijek | 2–0 | 1–1 | 2–0 | 0–2 | 7 |
| Slaven Belupo | 0–0 | 2–0 | 1–2 | 2–0 | 7 |
| Šibenik | 3–0 | 1–0 | 1–1 | 1–0 | 10 |
| Varaždin | 0–0 | 1–1 | 0–1 | 1–0 | 5 |

Source: 2024–25 Croatian Football League article

== Matches ==
=== Croatian Football League ===
| 4 August 2024 1 | Rijeka | 4–0 | Lokomotiva | Rijeka |
| 18:50 CEST (UTC+02:00) | Fruk 13'; Ivanović 28'; Hodža 70'; Butić 83' | Report | Mersinaj (yellow card) 51'; Smakaj (yellow card) 64'; Živković (yellow card) 67'; Leovac (yellow card) 70' | Stadium: Rujevica; Attendance: 3,552; Referee: Igor Pajač (Sv. Ivan Zelina) |

| 11 August 2024 2 | Varaždin | 0–0 | Rijeka | Varaždin |
| 21:00 CEST (UTC+02:00) | | Report | Janković (yellow card) 37'; Selahi (yellow card) 68'; Majstorović (yellow card) 70' | Stadium: Varteks; Attendance: 1,956; Referee: Tihomir Pejin (Donji Miholjac) |

| 18 August 2024 3 | Rijeka | 4–0 | Istra 1961 | Rijeka |
| 21:00 CEST (UTC+02:00) | Rukavina 19'; Pašalić 24'; Ivanović 28' 66' | Report | Iovu (yellow card) 15'; Lekweiry (yellow card) 45+2'; Marešić (yellow card) 47'; Majkić (yellow card) 52'; Keller (yellow card) 68'; Čuić (yellow card) 90+3' | Stadium: Rujevica; Attendance: 4,159; Referee: Toni Dadić (Zagreb) |

| 25 August 2024 4 | Osijek | 0–2 | Rijeka | Osijek |
| 20:45 CEST (UTC+02:00) | | Report | Radeljić 13'; Petrovič (yellow card) 26'; Pašalić 60' | Stadium: Opus Arena; Attendance: 7,014; Referee: Ante Čulina (Zagreb) |

| 1 September 2024 5 | Rijeka | 1–1 | Dinamo Zagreb | Rijeka |
| 20:45 CEST (UTC+02:00) | Majstorović (yellow card) 30'; Petrovič (yellow card) 45+1'; Hodža 50'; Andrić (yellow card) 68'; Radeljić (yellow card) 90+1' | Report | Petković 22'; Sučić (yellow card) 45+2'; Mišić (yellow card) 66'; Córdoba (yellow card) 90' | Stadium: Rujevica; Attendance: 5,624; Referee: Duje Strukan (Split) |

| 14 September 2024 6 | Gorica | 0–1 | Rijeka | Velika Gorica |
| 20:00 CEST (UTC+02:00) | Ndockyt (yellow card) 11'; Kolar (yellow card) 73'; Pršir (yellow card) 85' | Report | Gojak (yellow card) 20'; Janković 58' | Stadium: Radnik; Attendance: 512; Referee: Zdenko Lovrić (Đakovo) |

| 22 September 2024 7 | Rijeka | 3–0 | Šibenik | Rijeka |
| 20:00 CEST (UTC+02:00) | Fruk 3'; Andrić 20'; Rukavina (yellow card) 41'; Galešić 81' | Report | Perić (yellow card) 60' | Stadium: Rujevica; Attendance: 4,431; Referee: Mario Zebec (Cestica) |

| 29 September 2024 8 | Rijeka | 0–0 | Hajduk Split | Rijeka |
| 20:00 CEST (UTC+02:00) | | Report | Uremović (yellow card) 53' | Stadium: Rujevica; Attendance: 7,505; Referee: Ante Čulina (Zagreb) |

| 5 October 2024 9 | Slaven Belupo | 0–0 | Rijeka | Koprivnica |
| 18:30 CEST (UTC+02:00) | Agbekpornu (yellow card) 66'; Nestorovski (yellow card) 68' | Report | Janković (yellow card) 33' | Stadium: Gradski; Attendance: 913; Referee: Mario Zebec (Cestica) |

| 18 October 2024 10 | Lokomotiva | 2–2 | Rijeka | Zagreb |
| 18:00 CEST (UTC+02:00) | Smakaj (yellow card) 13'; Karačić 26'; Vranjković (yellow card) 55'; Mersinaj (yellow card) 55'; Čop 67' (pen.); Goričan (yellow card) 89' | Report | Radeljić 23' (yellow card) 88'; Selahi (yellow card) 42'; Smolčić 90' | Stadium: Kranjčevićeva; Attendance: 924; Referee: Duje Strukan (Split) |

| 26 October 2024 11 | Rijeka | 1–1 | Varaždin | Rijeka |
| 18:30 CEST (UTC+02:00) | Galešić 15'; Majstorović (yellow card) 63' | Report | Šego 31' (pen.); Marina (yellow card) 52'; Mladenovski (yellow card) 57'; Maglica (yellow card) 79' | Stadium: Rujevica; Attendance: 3,827; Referee: Toni Dadić (Zagreb) |

| 3 November 2024 12 | Istra 1961 | 0–1 | Rijeka | Pula |
| 15:00 CET (UTC+01:00) | Kadušić (yellow card) 27'; Lawal (yellow card) 40'; Valinčić (yellow card) 86' | Report | Rukavina (yellow card) 16'; Smolčić (yellow card) 29'; Janković (yellow card) 35'; Devetak (yellow card) 45'; Pašalić (yellow card) 54'; Fruk 77'; Butić (yellow card) 90+1' | Stadium: Aldo Drosina; Attendance: 3,569; Referee: Mateo Erceg (Benkovac) |

| 10 November 2024 13 | Rijeka | 1–1 | Osijek | Rijeka |
| 17:45 CET (UTC+01:00) | Fruk 51'; Gojak (yellow card) 83'; Smolčić (yellow card) 90+2'; Zlomislić (yellow card) 90+5' | Report | Cvijanović (yellow card) 56'; Hasić 90+5' | Stadium: Rujevica; Attendance: 5,106; Referee: Igor Pajač (Sv. Ivan Zelina) |

| 23 November 2024 14 | Dinamo Zagreb | 0–0 | Rijeka | Zagreb |
| 17:45 CET (UTC+01:00) | Ogiwara (yellow card) 56'; Ristovski (yellow card) 75'; Torrente (yellow card) 82' | Report | Zlomislić (yellow card) 76'; Smolčić (yellow card) 83'; Galešić (yellow card) 83' | Stadium: Maksimir; Attendance: 12,066; Referee: Duje Strukan (Split) |

| 30 November 2024 15 | Rijeka | 1–0 | Gorica | Rijeka |
| 17:30 CET (UTC+01:00) | Selahi (red card) 11'; Devetak (yellow card) 16'; Rukavina 85'; Radeljić (yellow card) 86' | Report | Šlogar (yellow card) 43' | Stadium: Rujevica; Attendance: 3,643; Referee: Igor Pajač (Sv. Ivan Zelina) |

| 8 December 2024 16 | Šibenik | 0–1 | Rijeka | Šibenik |
| 15:00 CET (UTC+01:00) | Majić (yellow card) 49'; Gačić (yellow card) 51'; Bakić (yellow card) 57'; Perić (yellow card) 90+10'; Đaković (yellow card) 90+10' | Report | Janković (penalty missed) 4'; Devetak 19'; Fruk (yellow card) 51'; Smolčić (yellow card) 63' | Stadium: Šubićevac; Attendance: 684; Referee: Patrik Kolarić (Čakovec) |

| 15 December 2024 17 | Hajduk Split | 2–2 | Rijeka | Split |
| 17:45 CET (UTC+01:00) | Kalik 7' 36' (yellow card) 44'; Rakitić (yellow card) 64' | Report | Janković 12'; Devetak (yellow card) 44'; Majstorović (yellow card) 44'; Selahi 47' (yellow card) 48'; Petrovič (yellow card) 59'; Galešić (yellow card) 90+3' | Stadium: Poljud; Attendance: 29,489; Referee: Mateo Erceg (Benkovac) |

| 22 December 2024 18 | Rijeka | 2–0 | Slaven Belupo | Rijeka |
| 15:00 CET (UTC+01:00) | Galešić (yellow card) 22'; Pašalić 60'; Janković 75' | Report | Crepulja (yellow card) 19'; Caimacov (yellow card) 51'; Grgić (yellow card) 63'; Dolček (yellow card) 90+2' | Stadium: Rujevica; Attendance: 5,244; Referee: Dario Bel (Osijek) |

| 26 January 2025 19 | Rijeka | 4–1 | Lokomotiva | Rijeka |
| 15:00 CET (UTC+01:00) | Pašalić (yellow card) 12' (goal) 60'; Djouahra 22' 49'; Fruk 41' | Report | Vuković 53' | Stadium: Rujevica; Attendance: 3,172; Referee: Dario Bel (Osijek) |

| 1 February 2025 20 | Varaždin | 1–0 | Rijeka | Varaždin |
| 17:30 CET (UTC+01:00) | Mitrovski (yellow card) 23'; Latković 31'; Mamić (yellow card) 40'; Mazari (yellow card) 90+7' | Report | Devetak (yellow card) 20' (yellow-red card) 69'; Čop (yellow card) 69'; Fruk (red card) 90+1'; Bogojević (yellow card) 90+6' | Stadium: Varteks; Attendance: 1,738; Referee: Ante Čulina (Zagreb) |

| 9 February 2025 21 | Rijeka | 0–1 | Istra 1961 | Rijeka |
| 15:00 CET (UTC+01:00) | Goda (yellow card) 46'; Djouahra (yellow card) 71' | Report | Gagua 38'; Koski (yellow card) 52'; Fućak (yellow card) 56'; Keller (yellow card) 69'; Lončar (yellow card) 90+2' | Stadium: Rujevica; Attendance: 4,893; Referee: Oliver Romić (Osijek) |

| 16 February 2025 22 | Osijek | 0–2 | Rijeka | Osijek |
| 17:45 CET (UTC+01:00) | Babec (yellow card) 24'; Tuia (yellow card) 80' | Report | Čop 15'; Bogojević (yellow card) 26'; Janković 37' | Stadium: Opus Arena; Attendance: 4,780; Referee: Mateo Erceg (Benkovac) |

| 22 February 2025 23 | Rijeka | 4–0 | Dinamo Zagreb | Rijeka |
| 17:45 CET (UTC+01:00) | Djouahra 27'; Janković 39'; Petrovič 44'; Čop 52' | Report | Mmaee (yellow card) 29'; Kanga (yellow card) 30' (yellow-red card) 38'; Pierre-Gabriel (yellow card) 49' | Stadium: Rujevica; Attendance: 7,091; Referee: Dario Bel (Osijek) |

| 1 March 2025 24 | Gorica | 0–0 | Rijeka | Velika Gorica |
| 15:00 CET (UTC+01:00) | | Report | Majstorović (yellow card) 55'; Selahi (yellow card) 68'; Devetak (yellow card) 73' | Stadium: Radnik; Attendance: 1,859; Referee: Ante Čulina (Zagreb) |

| 7 March 2025 25 | Rijeka | 1–1 | Šibenik | Rijeka |
| 18:00 CET (UTC+01:00) | Fruk 16' | Report | Zuta (yellow card) 5'; Santini 39' (yellow card) 67'; Pozo (yellow card) 60' (yellow-red card) 86'; Filipović (yellow card) 90+2' | Stadium: Rujevica; Attendance: 5,348; Referee: Igor Pajač (Sv. Ivan Zelina) |

| 16 March 2025 26 | Rijeka | 3–0 | Hajduk Split | Rijeka |
| 17:45 CET (UTC+01:00) | Janković (yellow card) 15' (goal) 35' (pen.); Fruk 25' 89'; Devetak (yellow card) 59'; Bogojević (yellow card) 76' | Report | Livaja (yellow card) 30'; Hrgović (yellow card) 33'; Prpić (yellow card) 33'; Uremović (yellow card) 54'; Sanyang (yellow card) 70'; Diallo (yellow card) 84' | Stadium: Rujevica; Attendance: 8,095; Referee: Dario Bel (Osijek) |

| 29 March 2025 27 | Slaven Belupo | 2–1 | Rijeka | Koprivnica |
| 18:45 CET (UTC+01:00) | Ćubelić (yellow card) 20'; Božić (yellow card) 60'; Grgić 64'; Dolček 76' | Report | Fruk 17'; Petrovič (yellow card) 47'; Menalo (yellow card) 68' | Stadium: Gradski; Attendance: 1,967; Referee: Mateo Erceg (Benkovac) |

| 6 April 2025 28 | Lokomotiva | 0–1 | Rijeka | Zagreb |
| 16:00 CEST (UTC+02:00) | Sigali (yellow card) 32'; Leovac (yellow card) 41'; Goričan (yellow card) 65' | Report | Menalo (yellow card) 20'; Gojak (yellow card) 45'; Fruk 72' | Stadium: Kranjčevićeva; Attendance: 1,481; Referee: Zdenko Lovrić (Đakovo) |

| 13 April 2025 29 | Rijeka | 1–0 | Varaždin | Rijeka |
| 16:00 CEST (UTC+02:00) | Radeljić (yellow card) 26' (yellow-red card) 55'; Manev (yellow card) 82'; Selahi (yellow card) 85'; Menalo 90+2'; Fruk (yellow card) 90+4' | Report | Ba (yellow card) 22'; Dabro (yellow card) 43'; Mateos (yellow card) 83' | Stadium: Rujevica; Attendance: 5,227; Referee: Mateo Erceg (Benkovac) |

| 19 April 2025 30 | Istra 1961 | 2–0 | Rijeka | Pula |
| 18:45 CEST (UTC+02:00) | Lawal 28'; Rozić 70' | Report | Gojak (yellow card) 22'; Janković (yellow card) 67'; Majstorović (yellow card) 79'; Oreč (yellow card) 84' | Stadium: Aldo Drosina; Attendance: 6,088; Referee: Dario Bel (Osijek) |

| 23 April 2025 31 | Rijeka | 0–2 | Osijek | Rijeka |
| 20:00 CEST (UTC+02:00) | Manev (yellow card) 5'; Oreč (yellow card) 49' | Report | Jakupović (yellow card) 20'; Omerović 32'; Soldo 53'; Lima (yellow card) 90+5' | Stadium: Rujevica; Attendance: 5,704; Referee: Ante Čulina (Zagreb) |

| 27 April 2025 32 | Dinamo Zagreb | 1–0 | Rijeka | Zagreb |
| 18:45 CEST (UTC+02:00) | Pjaca 13'; Théophile-Catherine (yellow card) 53'; Franjić (yellow card) 88' | Report | Petrovič (yellow card) 45+1'; Oreč (yellow card) 66'; Fruk (yellow card) 80' | Stadium: Maksimir; Attendance: 15,711; Referee: Patrik Kolarić (Čakovec) |

| 4 May 2025 33 | Rijeka | 2–1 | Gorica | Rijeka |
| 18:15 CEST (UTC+02:00) | Janković 9' (yellow card) 80'; Rukavina 30'; Čop (yellow card) 38'; Devetak (yellow card) 64'; Radeljić (yellow card) 79'; Butić (yellow card) 87' | Report | Elezi (yellow card) 64'; Halilović 82' | Stadium: Rujevica; Attendance: 5,883; Referee: Duje Strukan (Split) |

| 10 May 2025 34 | Šibenik | 0–1 | Rijeka | Šibenik |
| 17:00 CEST (UTC+02:00) | Bakić (yellow card) 32'; Zuta (yellow card) 44'; Santini (yellow card) 86'; Iker Pozo (yellow card) 90+2' | Report | Djouahra 65' | Stadium: Šubićevac; Attendance: 2,224; Referee: Ante Čulina (Zagreb) |

| 18 May 2025 35 | Hajduk Split | 2–1 | Rijeka | Split |
| 18:45 CEST (UTC+02:00) | Livaja 12' (pen.); Uremović (yellow card) 76'; Trajkovski 78' | Report | Čop 73'; Gojak (yellow card) 87'; Majstorović (yellow card) 90+2'; Fruk (yellow card) 90+3' | Stadium: Poljud; Attendance: 16,954; Referee: Igor Pajač (Sv. Ivan Zelina) |

| 25 May 2025 36 | Rijeka | 2–0 | Slaven Belupo | Rijeka |
| 17:00 CEST (UTC+02:00) | Janković 12'; Fruk 50' (yellow card) 50'; Selahi (yellow card) 71'; Petrovič (yellow card) 78' | Report | Liber (yellow card) 35' | Stadium: Rujevica; Attendance: 8,187; Referee: Dario Bel (Osijek) |

=== Croatian Cup ===
| 18 September 2024 R1 | Neretvanac Opuzen | 1–3 | Rijeka | Rijeka |
| 18:30 CEST (UTC+02:00) | Bajkuša (yellow card) 11'; Mikulić (yellow card) 63'; K. Medić 83'; Tomašević (yellow card) 88' | Report | Andrić 10'; Pašalić 33'; Radeljić 60'; Goda (yellow card) 69' | Stadium: Rujevica; Attendance: 3,166; Referee: Ivan Vukančić (Benkovac) |

| 22 October 2024 R2 | Bednja | 0–3 | Rijeka | Rijeka |
| 19:30 CEST (UTC+02:00) | Puškadija (yellow card) 20'; Bosilj (yellow card) 25'; Horvat (yellow card) 77' | Report | Galešić (yellow card) 28'; Gojak (yellow card) 52'; Pašalić 60' 62' (yellow card) 68'; Butić 90' | Stadium: Rujevica; Attendance: 2,918; Referee: Oliver Romić (Osijek) |

| 26 February 2025 QF | Hajduk Split | 1–3 | Rijeka | Split |
| 17:00 CET (UTC+01:00) | Livaja 29' (yellow card) 89'; Diallo (yellow card) 45+2'; Lučić (yellow card) 90+5' | Report | Djouahra 6'; Fruk 14' 51'; Majstorović (yellow card) 65'; Menalo (yellow card) 85' | Stadium: Poljud; Attendance: 19,340; Referee: Patrik Kolarić (Čakovec) |

| 2 April 2025 SF | Rijeka | 1–0 | Istra 1961 | Rijeka |
| 20:00 CEST (UTC+02:00) | Radeljić (yellow card) 20'; Devetak (yellow card) 30'; Menalo (yellow card) 50'; Fruk 86' | Report | Valinčić (yellow card) 30'; Maurić (yellow card) 42'; Radošević (yellow card) 56'; Heister (yellow card) 90+2' | Stadium: Rujevica; Attendance: 6,109; Referee: Igor Pajač (Zagreb) |

| 14 May 2025 Final | Slaven Belupo | 1–1 | Rijeka | Koprivnica |
| 18:00 CEST (UTC+02:00) | Bosec 69' | Report | Fruk 25'; Rukavina (yellow card) 40'; Janković (yellow card) 90+2' | Stadium: Gradski; Attendance: 4,448; Referee: Patrik Kolarić (Čakovec) |

| 29 May 2025 Final | Rijeka | 1–0 (2–1 agg.) | Slaven Belupo | Rijeka |
| 19:00 CEST (UTC+02:00) | Djouahra 60'; Oreč (yellow card) 70'; Menalo (yellow card) 81' (yellow-red card) 86'; Čop (yellow card) 86'; Rukavina (yellow card) 90+5' | Report | Nestorovski (yellow card) 20'; Agbekpornu (yellow card) 22'; Jakir (yellow card) 69'; Jagušić (yellow card) 86' | Stadium: Rujevica; Attendance: 8,181; Referee: Dario Bel (Osijek) |

=== UEFA Europa League ===
| 25 July 2024 QR2 | Corvinul Hunedoara (Romania) | 0–0 | (Croatia) Rijeka | Sibiu, Romania |
| 20:00 EEST (UTC+03:00) | Buș (yellow card) 16'; Lică (yellow card) 76'; Hrezdac (yellow card) 88' | Report | | Stadium: Sibiu Municipal Stadium; Attendance: 7,432; Referee: Philip Farrugia (Malta) |

| 1 August 2024 QR2 | Rijeka (Croatia) | 1–0 (1–0 agg.) | (Romania) Corvinul Hunedoara | Rijeka, Croatia |
| 20:00 CEST (UTC+02:00) | Petrovič 12'; Posavec (yellow card) 74'; Pašalić (yellow card) 75'; Galešić (yellow card) 78' | Report | Buș (yellow card) 49' (penalty missed) 76'; Manolache (yellow card) 90+1'; Lefter (yellow card) 90+7' | Stadium: Rujevica; Attendance: 4,683; Referee: Sivert Øksnes Amland (Norway) |

| 8 August 2024 QR3 | Rijeka (Croatia) | 1–1 | (Sweden) Elfsborg | Rijeka, Croatia |
| 20:00 CEST (UTC+02:00) | Pašalić (yellow card) 40'; Galešić 45+2'; Rukavina (yellow card) 80' | Report | Abdulai (yellow card) 8' (yellow-red card) 56' (goal) 24'; Baldursson (yellow card) 31'; Holmén (yellow card) 36'; Yegbe (yellow card) 50' | Stadium: Rujevica; Attendance: 4,867; Referee: Anastasios Sidiropoulos (Greece) |

| 15 August 2024 QR3 | Elfsborg (Sweden) | 2–0 (3–1 agg.) | (Croatia) Rijeka | Borås, Sweden |
| 19:00 CEST (UTC+02:00) | Baidoo (yellow card) 58' (goal) 68'; Holmén (yellow card) 83'; Qasem 83' | Report | Fruk (yellow card) 39'; Petrovič (yellow card) 56'; Janković (yellow card) 81'; Smolčić (yellow card) 81'; Galešić (yellow card) 89'; Zlomislić (yellow card) 89' | Stadium: Borås Arena; Attendance: 6,035; Referee: Andris Treimanis (Latvia) |

=== UEFA Conference League ===
| 22 August 2024 PO | Rijeka (Croatia) | 1–1 | (Slovenia) Olimpija Ljubljana | Rijeka, Croatia |
| 20:00 CEST (UTC+02:00) | Ivanović 33'; Pašalić (yellow card) 49'; Zlomislić (yellow card) 75'; Majstorović (yellow card) 76'; Fruk (yellow card) 83' | Report | Ratnik (yellow card) 34'; Doffo (yellow card) 34'; Sualehe (yellow card) 35'; Lucas 76' (pen.); Thalisson (yellow card) 78' | Stadium: Rujevica; Attendance: 6,487; Referee: César Soto Grado (Spain) |

| 29 August 2024 PO | Olimpija Ljubljana (Slovenia) | 5–0 (6–1 agg.) | (Croatia) Rijeka | Ljubljana, Slovenia |
| 19:00 CEST (UTC+02:00) | Florucz 2' (yellow card) 54'; Thalisson (yellow card) 10' (goal) 13' 45'; Kojić 35'; Lucas 47' | Report | Janković (yellow card) 8'; Radeljić (yellow card) 38'; Petrovič (yellow card) 52' | Stadium: Stožice; Attendance: 12,616; Referee: Urs Schnyder (Switzerland) |

=== Friendlies ===
==== Pre-season ====
| 29 June 2024 Friendly | Rijeka (Croatia) | 1–0 | (Slovenia) Koper | Rijeka, Croatia |
| 19:00 CEST (UTC+02:00) | Smolčić 2' | Report | | Stadium: Rujevica (training ground); Attendance: Behind closed doors Referee: Antonio Melnjak (Rijeka) |

| 6 July 2024 Friendly | Rijeka (Croatia) | 7–1 (Note: The game was played with 60 minute halves.) | (Slovenia) Primorje | Rijeka, Croatia |
| 19:00 CEST (UTC+02:00) | Ivanović 23'; Hodža 32'; Fruk 44'; Galešić 52'; Butić 70'; Djouahra 93' (pen.); Bilajac 120' | Report | Smajlagić 80' | Stadium: Rujevica (training ground); Attendance: Behind closed doors Referee: Marin Rožman (Rijeka) |

| 10 July 2024 Friendly | Rijeka (Croatia) | 3–1 | (Hungary) Nyíregyháza | Haus im Ennstal, Austria |
| 11:00 CEST (UTC+02:00) | Fruk (yellow card) 53'; Ivanović 70' 85'; Butić 80' | Report | Kovács (yellow card) 78'; Oláh 120' | Stadium: SV Union HAUS/Ennstal; Attendance: 50; Referee: Paul Nisandžić |

| 13 July 2024 Friendly | Rijeka (Croatia) | 0–1 | (Germany) Karlsruher SC | Bruck an der Mur, Austria |
| 17:00 CEST (UTC+02:00) | Hodža (yellow card) | Report | Schleusener 98' | Stadium: Sportstadion Bruck an der Mur; Referee: Andreas Gruber |

| 17 July 2024 Friendly | Red Bull Salzburg (Austria) | 1–0 | (Croatia) Rijeka | Anif, Austria |
| 18:00 CEST (UTC+02:00) | Daghim 60' | Report | Rukavina (yellow card) 71' | Stadium: USK Anif - Maximarkt Sportpark; Attendance: 700; Referee: Sebastian Gishamer |

| 18 July 2024 Friendly | Rijeka (Croatia) | 1–1 | (Slovenia) Triglav Kranj | Seeboden am Millstätter See, Austria |
| 11:00 CEST (UTC+02:00) | Butić 85' | Report | Kazić 76' | Stadium: Sportarena Seeboden; Attendance: 100; Referee: Edin Avdić |

==== In-season (2024) ====
| 27 July 2024 Friendly | Rijeka | 5–3 | Orijent | Rijeka |
| 18:30 CEST (UTC+02:00) | Rukavina 32'; Ivanović 43'; Burčul 51'; Hodža 81'; Banda 83' | Report | Tadejević 7'; Monjac 13'; Medojević 62' | Stadium: Rujevica (training ground); Attendance: Behind closed doors Referee: Marin Rožman (Rijeka) |

| 7 September 2024 Friendly | Rijeka (Croatia) | 1–1 (Note: The first half lasted 45 minutes, the second half lasted 60 minutes.) | (Slovenia) Primorje | Rijeka, Croatia |
| 17:00 CEST (UTC+02:00) | Perica 51' | Report | Agrelos 65' | Stadium: Rujevica (training ground); Attendance: Behind closed doors Referee: Zvonko Radić (Rijeka) |

| 9 October 2024 Friendly | Halubjan | 0–2 | Rijeka | Viškovo |
| 16:00 CEST (UTC+02:00) | | Report | Gojak 48'; Perica 83' | Stadium: Brnasi; Attendance: 500; Referee: Vladimir Merle (Rijeka) |

| 12 October 2024 Friendly | Rijeka (Croatia) | 4–1 | (Slovenia) Koper | Rijeka, Croatia |
| 16:00 CEST (UTC+02:00) | Janković 9'; Perica 11'; Gojak 50'; Žlibanović 73'; Smolčić (yellow card) | Report | Ivkič 70' | Stadium: Rujevica; Attendance: Behind closed doors Referee: Marin Rožman (Rijeka) |

| 4 November 2024 Friendly | Rijeka | 3–1 (Note: The game was played with 30 minute halves.) | Opatija | Rijeka |
| | Gojak 2'; Babić 36'; Djouahra 42' | Report | Vidušin 58' | Stadium: Rujevica (training ground); Attendance: Behind closed doors Referee: Marin Rožman (Rijeka) |

| 15 November 2024 Friendly | Rijeka | 1–0 | Lokomotiva Zagreb | Rijeka |
| 13:00 CET (UTC+01:00) | Djouahra 6' | Report | | Stadium: Rujevica; Attendance: Behind closed doors Referee: Antonio Melnjak (Rijeka) |

| 9 December 2024 Friendly | Rijeka | 2–1 (Note: The game was played with 35 minute halves.) | Opatija | Rijeka |
| | Perica 31'; Goda 42' | Report | Saho 14' | Stadium: Rujevica (training ground); Attendance: Behind closed doors Referee: Mario Prpić (Rijeka) |

==== Mid-season ====
| 8 January 2025 Friendly | Rijeka (Croatia) | 1–1 | (Slovenia) Primorje | Rijeka, Croatia |
| 15:00 CET (UTC+01:00) | Dogan 27' | Report | Suljanović 57' | Stadium: Rujevica (training ground); Attendance: Behind closed doors Referee: Antonio Melnjak (Rijeka) |

| 14 January 2025 Friendly | Rijeka (Croatia) | 0–1 | (Slovenia) Radomlje | Čatež ob Savi, Slovenia |
| 14:00 CET (UTC+01:00) | Bogojević (yellow card) 33' | Report | Vokić 81' | Stadium: Terme Čatež football field Attendance: 100; Referee: David Vozlič |

| 17 January 2025 Friendly | Rijeka (Croatia) | 2–0 | (Austria) Sturm Graz | Čatež ob Savi, Slovenia |
| 14:30 CET (UTC+01:00) | Pašalić 21'; Fruk 85'; Devetak (yellow card) | Report | Wüthrich (yellow card) 49'; Gorenc Stanković (yellow card) 57' | Stadium: Terme Čatež football field Attendance: 50; Referee: Dejan Plevček |

| 18 January 2025 Friendly | Rijeka (Croatia) | 1–1 | (Austria) Grazer AK | Čatež ob Savi, Slovenia |
| 14:30 CET (UTC+01:00) | Dogan 27'; Rukavina (yellow card) 82' | Report | Frieser (yellow card) 39'; Gantschnig 84' | Stadium: Terme Čatež football field Attendance: 50; Referee: Filip Narat |

==== In-season (2025) ====
| 27 January 2025 Friendly | Rijeka | 1–0 (Note: The game was played with 40 minute halves.) | Opatija | Rijeka |
| 11:00 CET (UTC+01:00) | Ilinković 75' | Report | | Stadium: Rujevica (training ground); Attendance: Behind closed doors Referee: Marin Rožman (Rijeka) |

| 10 February 2025 Friendly | Rijeka | 2–2 | Opatija | Rijeka |
| | Medojević 10'; Rukavina 15' | Report | Mulac 48' (pen.); V. Bogolin 70' | Stadium: Rujevica; Attendance: Behind closed doors |

| 23 March 2025 Friendly | Rijeka (Croatia) | 8–2 | (Slovenia) Tolmin | Rijeka, Croatia |
| | Djouahra 23'; Dogan 50' 59' 88'; Gojak 63'; Simić 70' (o.g.); Butić 77'; Saho 84' | Report | Hadaji 31'; Panić 68' | Stadium: Rujevica (training ground); Attendance: Behind closed doors Referee: Marin Rožman (Rijeka) |

== Player seasonal records ==
Updated 29 May 2025. Competitive matches only.

=== Goals ===
| Rank | Name | League | Europe | Cup | Total |
|---|---|---|---|---|---|
| 1 | (Croatia) Toni Fruk | 11 | – | 4 | 15 |
| 2 | (Croatia) Niko Janković | 8 | – | – | 8 |
| 3 | (Croatia) Marco Pašalić | 4 | – | 3 | 7 |
| 4 | (France) Naïs Djouahra | 4 | – | 2 | 6 |
| 5 | (Croatia) Franjo Ivanović | 3 | 1 | – | 4 |
| 6 | (Croatia) Duje Čop | 3 | – | – | 3 |
| 6 | (Croatia) Gabriel Rukavina | 3 | – | – | 3 |
| 6 | (Croatia) Niko Galešić | 2 | 1 | – | 3 |
| 6 | (Bosnia and Herzegovina) Stjepan Radeljić | 2 | – | 1 | 3 |
| 10 | (Croatia) Veldin Hodža | 2 | – | – | 2 |
| 10 | (Slovenia) Dejan Petrovič | 1 | 1 | – | 2 |
| 10 | (Serbia) Komnen Andrić | 1 | – | 1 | 2 |
| 10 | (Croatia) Šimun Butić | 1 | – | 1 | 2 |
| 14 | (Serbia) Mladen Devetak | 1 | – | – | 1 |
| 14 | (Bosnia and Herzegovina) Luka Menalo | 1 | – | – | 1 |
| 14 | (Albania) Lindon Selahi | 1 | – | – | 1 |
| 14 | (Croatia) Ivan Smolčić | 1 | – | – | 1 |
| TOTALS | | 49 | 3 | 12 | 64 |

Source: Competitive matches

=== Clean sheets ===
| Rank | Name | League | Europe | Cup | Total |
|---|---|---|---|---|---|
| 1 | (Bosnia and Herzegovina) Martin Zlomislić | 19 | 2 | 3 | 24 |
| 2 | (Croatia) Josip Posavec | 1 | 1 | – | 2 |
| 3 | (Croatia) Domagoj Ivan Marić | 1 | – | – | 1 |
| 3 | (Croatia) Niko Vučetić | 1 | – | – | 1 |
| TOTALS | | 22 | 3 | 3 | 28 |

Source: Competitive matches

=== Disciplinary record ===
| Number | Position | Player | HNL | | | Europe | | | Croatian Cup | | | Total | | |
|---|---|---|---|---|---|---|---|---|---|---|---|---|---|---|
| Number | Position | Player | Yellow card | (yellow card) (yellow-red card) | Red card | Yellow card | (yellow card) (yellow-red card) | Red card | Yellow card | (yellow card) (yellow-red card) | Red card | Yellow card | (yellow card) (yellow-red card) | Red card |
| 1 | GK | (Croatia) Josip Posavec | 0 | 0 | 0 | 1 | 0 | 0 | 0 | 0 | 0 | 1 | 0 | 0 |
| 3 | DF | (Croatia) Bruno Goda | 1 | 0 | 0 | 0 | 0 | 0 | 1 | 0 | 0 | 2 | 0 | 0 |
| 4 | MF | (Croatia) Niko Janković | 6 | 0 | 0 | 2 | 0 | 0 | 1 | 0 | 0 | 9 | 0 | 0 |
| 5 | DF | (Croatia) Niko Galešić | 3 | 0 | 0 | 2 | 0 | 0 | 1 | 0 | 0 | 6 | 0 | 0 |
| 6 | DF | (Bosnia and Herzegovina) Stjepan Radeljić | 4 | 1 | 0 | 1 | 0 | 0 | 1 | 0 | 0 | 6 | 1 | 0 |
| 7 | FW | (France) Naïs Djouahra | 1 | 0 | 0 | 0 | 0 | 0 | 0 | 0 | 0 | 1 | 0 | 0 |
| 8 | MF | (Slovenia) Dejan Petrovič | 6 | 0 | 0 | 2 | 0 | 0 | 0 | 0 | 0 | 8 | 0 | 0 |
| 9 | FW | (Serbia) Komnen Andrić | 1 | 0 | 0 | 0 | 0 | 0 | 0 | 0 | 0 | 1 | 0 | 0 |
| 9 | FW | (Croatia) Duje Čop | 2 | 0 | 0 | 0 | 0 | 0 | 1 | 0 | 0 | 3 | 0 | 0 |
| 10 | MF | (Croatia) Toni Fruk | 4 | 0 | 1 | 2 | 0 | 0 | 0 | 0 | 0 | 6 | 0 | 1 |
| 11 | FW | (Croatia) Gabriel Rukavina | 2 | 0 | 0 | 1 | 0 | 0 | 2 | 0 | 0 | 5 | 0 | 0 |
| 13 | GK | (Bosnia and Herzegovina) Martin Zlomislić | 2 | 0 | 0 | 2 | 0 | 0 | 0 | 0 | 0 | 4 | 0 | 0 |
| 14 | MF | (Bosnia and Herzegovina) Amer Gojak | 5 | 0 | 0 | 0 | 0 | 0 | 1 | 0 | 0 | 6 | 0 | 0 |
| 15 | DF | (North Macedonia) Jovan Manev | 2 | 0 | 0 | 0 | 0 | 0 | 0 | 0 | 0 | 2 | 0 | 0 |
| 17 | MF | (Bosnia and Herzegovina) Luka Menalo | 2 | 0 | 0 | 0 | 0 | 0 | 2 | 1 | 0 | 4 | 1 | 0 |
| 18 | MF | (Albania) Lindon Selahi | 6 | 0 | 1 | 0 | 0 | 0 | 0 | 0 | 0 | 6 | 0 | 1 |
| 22 | DF | (Croatia) Ante Oreč | 3 | 0 | 0 | 0 | 0 | 0 | 1 | 0 | 0 | 4 | 0 | 0 |
| 27 | FW | (Croatia) Šimun Butić | 2 | 0 | 0 | 0 | 0 | 0 | 0 | 0 | 0 | 2 | 0 | 0 |
| 28 | DF | (Croatia) Ivan Smolčić | 4 | 0 | 0 | 1 | 0 | 0 | 0 | 0 | 0 | 5 | 0 | 0 |
| 30 | MF | (Croatia) Bruno Bogojević | 3 | 0 | 0 | 0 | 0 | 0 | 0 | 0 | 0 | 3 | 0 | 0 |
| 34 | DF | (Serbia) Mladen Devetak | 6 | 1 | 0 | 0 | 0 | 0 | 1 | 0 | 0 | 7 | 1 | 0 |
| 45 | DF | (Croatia) Ante Majstorović | 7 | 0 | 0 | 1 | 0 | 0 | 1 | 0 | 0 | 9 | 0 | 0 |
| 87 | MF | (Croatia) Marco Pašalić | 2 | 0 | 0 | 3 | 0 | 0 | 1 | 0 | 0 | 6 | 0 | 0 |
| TOTALS | | | 74 | 2 | 2 | 18 | 0 | 0 | 14 | 1 | 0 | 106 | 3 | 2 |

Source: nk-rijeka.hr

=== Appearances and goals ===
| Number | Position | Player | Apps | Goals | Apps | Goals | Apps | Goals | Apps | Goals |
| Number | Position | Player | Total | | HNL (Note: First number represents appearances in starting eleven, while the second number indicates a substitute appearance.) | | Europe | | Croatian Cup | |
|---|---|---|---|---|---|---|---|---|---|---|
| 1 | GK | (Croatia) Josip Posavec | 3 | 0 | 1+0 | 0 | 0+1 | 0 | 1+0 | 0 |
| 3 | DF | (Croatia) Bruno Goda | 7 | 0 | 4+2 | 0 | 0+0 | 0 | 1+0 | 0 |
| 4 | MF | (Croatia) Niko Janković | 45 | 8 | 32+0 | 8 | 6+0 | 0 | 5+0 | 0 |
| 5 | DF | (Croatia) Niko Galešić | 23 | 3 | 14+2 | 2 | 6+0 | 1 | 1+0 | 0 |
| 5 | DF | (Croatia) Mile Škorić | 3 | 0 | 3+0 | 0 | 0+0 | 0 | 0+0 | 0 |
| 6 | DF | (Bosnia and Herzegovina) Stjepan Radeljić | 37 | 3 | 23+4 | 2 | 5+0 | 0 | 5+0 | 1 |
| 7 | FW | (France) Naïs Djouahra | 35 | 6 | 22+6 | 4 | 0+2 | 0 | 5+0 | 2 |
| 8 | MF | (Slovenia) Dejan Petrovič | 44 | 2 | 33+1 | 1 | 6+0 | 1 | 4+0 | 0 |
| 9 | FW | (Serbia) Komnen Andrić | 13 | 2 | 5+4 | 1 | 0+2 | 0 | 1+1 | 1 |
| 9 | FW | (Croatia) Duje Čop | 18 | 3 | 10+5 | 3 | 0+0 | 0 | 2+1 | 0 |
| 9 | FW | (Colombia) Jorge Obregón | 2 | 0 | 0+0 | 0 | 1+1 | 0 | 0+0 | 0 |
| 10 | MF | (Croatia) Toni Fruk | 45 | 15 | 31+2 | 11 | 5+1 | 0 | 6+0 | 4 |
| 11 | FW | (Croatia) Franjo Ivanović | 10 | 4 | 4+0 | 3 | 5+1 | 1 | 0+0 | 0 |
| 11 | FW | (Croatia) Gabriel Rukavina | 40 | 3 | 13+18 | 3 | 0+3 | 0 | 2+4 | 0 |
| 12 | MF | (Zambia) Emmanuel Banda | 3 | 0 | 0+1 | 0 | 0+2 | 0 | 0+0 | 0 |
| 12 | GK | (Croatia) Niko Vučetić | 1 | 0 | 1+0 | 0 | 0+0 | 0 | 0+0 | 0 |
| 13 | GK | (Bosnia and Herzegovina) Martin Zlomislić | 45 | 0 | 34+0 | 0 | 6+0 | 0 | 5+0 | 0 |
| 14 | MF | (Bosnia and Herzegovina) Amer Gojak | 34 | 0 | 8+20 | 0 | 0+0 | 0 | 2+4 | 0 |
| 15 | DF | (North Macedonia) Jovan Manev | 7 | 0 | 2+5 | 0 | 0+0 | 0 | 0+0 | 0 |
| 17 | FW | (Bosnia and Herzegovina) Luka Menalo | 21 | 1 | 7+10 | 1 | 0+0 | 0 | 0+4 | 0 |
| 18 | MF | (Albania) Lindon Selahi | 42 | 1 | 25+5 | 1 | 2+4 | 0 | 6+0 | 0 |
| 20 | FW | (Croatia) Dominik Dogan | 16 | 0 | 1+13 | 0 | 0+0 | 0 | 0+2 | 0 |
| 21 | MF | (Bosnia and Herzegovina) Silvio Ilinković | 19 | 0 | 3+11 | 0 | 0+0 | 0 | 0+5 | 0 |
| 22 | DF | (Croatia) Ante Oreč | 9 | 0 | 6+1 | 0 | 0+0 | 0 | 2+0 | 0 |
| 24 | DF | (Croatia) Bruno Burčul | 1 | 0 | 0+1 | 0 | 0+0 | 0 | 0+0 | 0 |
| 25 | MF | (Croatia) Veldin Hodža | 10 | 2 | 3+2 | 2 | 5+0 | 0 | 0+0 | 0 |
| 25 | GK | (Croatia) Domagoj Ivan Marić | 1 | 0 | 0+1 | 0 | 0+0 | 0 | 0+0 | 0 |
| 27 | FW | (Croatia) Šimun Butić | 20 | 2 | 1+13 | 1 | 0+3 | 0 | 0+3 | 1 |
| 28 | DF | (Croatia) Ivan Smolčić | 24 | 1 | 17+1 | 1 | 3+2 | 0 | 1+0 | 0 |
| 30 | MF | (Croatia) Bruno Bogojević | 39 | 0 | 10+17 | 0 | 3+3 | 0 | 3+3 | 0 |
| 32 | DF | (Croatia) Marijan Čabraja | 6 | 0 | 2+0 | 0 | 3+0 | 0 | 1+0 | 0 |
| 34 | DF | (Serbia) Mladen Devetak | 38 | 1 | 29+2 | 1 | 3+0 | 0 | 4+0 | 0 |
| 37 | FW | (The Gambia) Cherno Saho | 1 | 0 | 0+1 | 0 | 0+0 | 0 | 0+0 | 0 |
| 45 | DF | (Croatia) Ante Majstorović | 43 | 0 | 31+1 | 0 | 1+4 | 0 | 6+0 | 0 |
| 77 | FW | (Croatia) Stipe Perica | 8 | 0 | 1+5 | 0 | 0+0 | 0 | 1+1 | 0 |
| 87 | MF | (Croatia) Marco Pašalić | 27 | 7 | 18+1 | 4 | 6+0 | 0 | 2+0 | 3 |

Source: nk-rijeka.hr

=== Suspensions ===
| Date Incurred | Competition | Player | Games Missed | Reason |
|---|---|---|---|---|
| 26 Oct 2024 | HNL | (Croatia) Ante Majstorović | 1 | Yellow card |
| 3 Nov 2024 | HNL | (Croatia) Niko Janković | 1 | Yellow card |
| 23 Nov 2024 | HNL | (Croatia) Ivan Smolčić | 1 | Yellow card |
| 30 Nov 2024 | HNL | (Bosnia and Herzegovina) Stjepan Radeljić | 1 | Yellow card |
| 30 Nov 2024 | HNL | (Albania) Lindon Selahi | 1 | Red card |
| 15 Dec 2024 | HNL | (Serbia) Mladen Devetak | 1 | Yellow card |
| 15 Dec 2024 | HNL | (Albania) Lindon Selahi | 1 | Yellow card |
| 15 Dec 2024 | HNL | (Slovenia) Dejan Petrovič | 1 | Yellow card |
| 22 Dec 2024 | HNL | (Croatia) Niko Galešić | 1 | Yellow card |
| 1 Feb 2025 | HNL | (Serbia) Mladen Devetak | 1 | (yellow card) (yellow-red card) |
| 1 Feb 2025 | HNL | (Croatia) Duje Čop | 1 | Yellow card |
| 1 Feb 2025 | HNL | (Croatia) Toni Fruk | 2 | Red card |
| 16 Mar 2025 | HNL | (Croatia) Bruno Bogojević | 1 | Yellow card |
| 6 Apr 2025 | HNL | (Bosnia and Herzegovina) Amer Gojak | 1 | Yellow card |
| 13 Apr 2025 | HNL | (Bosnia and Herzegovina) Stjepan Radeljić | 1 | (yellow card) (yellow-red card) |
| 19 Apr 2025 | HNL | (Croatia) Ante Majstorović | 1 | Yellow card |
| 27 Apr 2025 | HNL | (Croatia) Toni Fruk | 1 | Yellow card |
| 27 Apr 2025 | HNL | (Croatia) Ante Oreč | 1 | Yellow card |
| 4 May 2025 | HNL | (Serbia) Mladen Devetak | 1 | Yellow card |
| 4 May 2025 | HNL | (Croatia) Niko Janković | 1 | Yellow card |
| 25 May 2025 | HNL | (Slovenia) Dejan Petrovič | 1 | Yellow card |
| 25 May 2025 | HNL | (Albania) Lindon Selahi | 1 | Yellow card |
| 29 May 2025 | Cup | (Bosnia and Herzegovina) Luka Menalo | 1 | (yellow card) (yellow-red card) |

=== Penalties ===
For
| Date | Competition | Player | Opposition | Scored? |
|---|---|---|---|---|
| 8 Dec 2024 | HNL | (Croatia) Niko Janković | Šibenik | ✗ |
| 16 Mar 2025 | HNL | (Croatia) Niko Janković | Hajduk Split | ✓ |
Against
| Date | Competition | Goalkeeper | Opposition | Scored? |
| 1 Aug 2024 | UEL | (Croatia) Josip Posavec | Corvinul Hunedoara | ✗ |
| 22 Aug 2024 | UCL | (Bosnia and Herzegovina) Martin Zlomislić | Olimpija Ljubljana | ✓ |
| 18 Oct 2024 | HNL | (Bosnia and Herzegovina) Martin Zlomislić | Lokomotiva Zagreb | ✓ |
| 26 Oct 2024 | HNL | (Bosnia and Herzegovina) Martin Zlomislić | Varaždin | ✓ |
| 18 May 2025 | HNL | (Bosnia and Herzegovina) Martin Zlomislić | Hajduk Split | ✓ |

== Transfers ==
=== In ===
| Date | Pos. | Player | Moving from | Type | Fee | Ref. |
|---|---|---|---|---|---|---|
| 17 Jun 2024 | CB | (Croatia) Anton Krešić | (Romania) CFR Cluj | Return from loan | —N/a | |
| 18 Jun 2024 | CM | (Bosnia and Herzegovina) Silvio Ilinković | (Bosnia and Herzegovina) Zrinjski Mostar | Return from loan | —N/a | |
| 19 Jun 2024 | CB | (Croatia) Duje Dujmović | (Croatia) Šibenik | Return from loan | —N/a | |
| 19 Jun 2024 | CB | (Croatia) Mateo Pavlović | (Croatia) Rudeš | Return from loan | —N/a | |
| 19 Jun 2024 | DM | (Croatia) Andro Babić | (Bosnia and Herzegovina) Posušje | Return from loan | —N/a | |
| 19 Jun 2024 | LW | (France) Naïs Djouahra | (Spain) Leganés | Return from loan | —N/a | |
| 19 Jun 2024 | CF | (Austria) Marco Djuricin | (Slovakia) Spartak Trnava | Return from loan | —N/a | |
| 20 Jun 2024 | CB | (Croatia) Tino Agić | (Croatia) Orijent | Return from loan | —N/a | |
| 26 Jun 2024 | GK | (Croatia) Josip Posavec | (Denmark) AaB | Transfer | Free | |
| 30 Jun 2024 | LM | (United States) Steven Juncaj | (United States) Michigan Stars FC | Return from loan | —N/a | |
| 8 Jul 2024 | CB | (Croatia) Ante Majstorović | (Croatia) Istra 1961 | Transfer | Free | |
| 16 Jul 2024 | LW | (Croatia) Gabriel Rukavina | (Croatia) Dinamo Zagreb | Transfer | Free | |
| 2 Aug 2024 | LB | (Serbia) Mladen Devetak | (Italy) Palermo | Transfer | Undisclosed | |
| 7 Aug 2024 | CF | (Serbia) Komnen Andrić | (France) Clermont Foot | Transfer | Undisclosed | |
| 4 Sep 2024 | CF | (Croatia) Stipe Perica | (Belgium) Standard Liège | Transfer | Free | |
| 5 Sep 2024 | AM | (Bosnia and Herzegovina) Amer Gojak | (Hungary) Ferencváros | Transfer | Free | |
| 5 Sep 2024 | CF | (Croatia) Dominik Dogan | (Croatia) Zrinski Osječko 1664 | Transfer | Free | |
| 9 Jan 2025 | CB | (Croatia) Mile Škorić | (China) Tianjin Jinmen Tiger | Transfer | Free | |
| 21 Jan 2025 | CB | (Croatia) Duje Dujmović | (Croatia) Šibenik | Return from loan | —N/a | |
| 23 Jan 2025 | LW | (Bosnia and Herzegovina) Luka Menalo | (Croatia) Dinamo Zagreb | Transfer | Free | |
| 23 Jan 2025 | CF | (Croatia) Niko Gajzler | (Slovenia) Radomlje | Return from loan | —N/a | |
| 23 Jan 2025 | GK | (Serbia) Aleksa Todorović | (Croatia) Karlovac 1919 | Return from loan | —N/a | |
| 24 Jan 2025 | CB | (Croatia) Petar Raguž | (Croatia) Gorica | Transfer | Undisclosed | |
| 27 Jan 2025 | CF | (Croatia) Duje Čop | (Croatia) Lokomotiva Zagreb | Transfer | €300,000 | |
| 6 Feb 2025 | CF | (The Gambia) Cherno Saho | (Croatia) Buje | Transfer | Undisclosed | |
| 11 Feb 2025 | CB | (North Macedonia) Jovan Manev | (Turkey) Adana Demirspor | Transfer | Free | |
| 17 Feb 2025 | LW | (Croatia) Dominik Simčić | (Slovenia) Koper | Return from loan | —N/a | |
| 18 Feb 2025 | RB | (Croatia) Ante Oreč | (Bosnia and Herzegovina) Velež Mostar | Transfer | €200,000 | |

Source: Glasilo Hrvatskog nogometnog saveza

=== Out ===
| Date | Pos. | Player | Moving to | Type | Fee | Ref. |
|---|---|---|---|---|---|---|
| 11 Jun 2024 | GK | (Croatia) Nediljko Labrović | (Germany) Augsburg | Transfer | €2,500,000 | |
| 17 Jun 2024 | CB | (Croatia) Anton Krešić | (Romania) CFR Cluj | Transfer | €400,000 | |
| 20 Jun 2024 | CB | (Austria) Emir Dilaver | —N/a | Retirement | —N/a | |
| 20 Jun 2024 | CB | (Croatia) Matej Mitrović | (Qatar) Al Ahli | End of contract | Free | |
| 30 Jun 2024 | DM | (Croatia) Antonio Galešić | (Croatia) Orijent | End of contract | Free | |
| 30 Jun 2024 | AM | (Croatia) Karlo Valjan | (Croatia) Orijent | End of contract | Free | |
| 30 Jun 2024 | CF | (Croatia) Mirko Marić | (Italy) Monza | End of loan | —N/a | |
| 1 Jul 2024 | CB | (Croatia) Mateo Pavlović | TBC | End of contract | Free | |
| 1 Jul 2024 | RB | (Portugal) Danilo Veiga | (Portugal) Estrela da Amadora | Transfer | Free | |
| 3 Jul 2024 | LM | (United States) Steven Juncaj | (United States) Michigan Stars FC | Released (mutual consent) | Free | |
| 3 Jul 2024 | LW | (Croatia) Marko Pjaca | (Croatia) Dinamo Zagreb | Transfer | €1,500,000 | |
| 6 Jul 2024 | LW | (Croatia) Dominik Simčić | (Slovenia) Koper | Loan (until 30/6/2025) | —N/a | |
| 12 Jul 2024 | CF | (Guinea) Momo Yansané | (Georgia (country)) Torpedo Kutaisi | Released (mutual consent) | Free | |
| 18 Jul 2024 | CF | (Croatia) Niko Gajzler | (Slovenia) Radomlje | Loan (until 29/6/2025; option to buy) | —N/a | |
| 31 Jul 2024 | CB | (Croatia) Duje Dujmović | (Croatia) Šibenik | Loan (until 26/6/2025) | —N/a | |
| 1 Aug 2024 | CB | (Croatia) Tino Agić | (Croatia) Lokomotiva Zagreb | End of contract | Free | |
| 1 Aug 2024 | DM | (Serbia) Damjan Pavlović | (Croatia) Gorica | End of contract | Free | |
| 9 Aug 2024 | CM | (Montenegro) Strahinja Tešović | (Croatia) Grobničan | Dual registration | —N/a | |
| 14 Aug 2024 | GK | (Nigeria) David Nwolokor | (Croatia) Opatija | Dual registration | —N/a | |
| 14 Aug 2024 | LB | (Croatia) Noel Bodetić | (Croatia) Orijent | Dual registration | —N/a | |
| 14 Aug 2024 | AM | (Croatia) Borna Panić | (Croatia) Orijent | Dual registration | —N/a | |
| 14 Aug 2024 | RW | (Montenegro) Nikola Medojević | (Croatia) Orijent | Dual registration | —N/a | |
| 14 Aug 2024 | RW | (North Macedonia) Matej Momčilovski | (Croatia) Orijent | Dual registration | —N/a | |
| 21 Aug 2024 | GK | (Serbia) Aleksa Todorović | (Croatia) Karlovac 1919 | Loan (until 14/6/2025) | —N/a | |
| 23 Aug 2024 | RB | (Croatia) Alen Grgić | (Croatia) Slaven Belupo | End of contract | Free | |
| 29 Aug 2024 | CF | (Colombia) Jorge Obregón | (Malaysia) Johor Darul Ta'zim | Transfer | €500,000 | |
| 31 Aug 2024 | CF | (Croatia) Franjo Ivanović | (Belgium) Union SG | Transfer | €4,000,000 | |
| 5 Sep 2024 | CF | (Austria) Marco Djuricin | (Austria) SV Stripfing | Released (mutual consent) | Free | |
| 12 Sep 2024 | DM | (Croatia) Veldin Hodža | (Russia) Rubin Kazan | Transfer | €3,000,000 | |
| 12 Sep 2024 | CM | (Zambia) Emmanuel Banda | (Saudi Arabia) Al-Tai | Released (mutual consent) | Free | |
| 4 Jan 2025 | CB | (Croatia) Niko Galešić | (Croatia) Dinamo Zagreb | Transfer | €3,000,000 | |
| 23 Jan 2025 | CF | (Croatia) Niko Gajzler | (Slovenia) Radomlje | Released (mutual consent) | Free | |
| 24 Jan 2025 | CB | (Croatia) Duje Dujmović | (Bosnia and Herzegovina) Zrinjski Mostar | Released (mutual consent) | Free | |
| 28 Jan 2025 | GK | (Croatia) Josip Posavec | (Slovenia) Primorje | Loan (until 30/6/2025) | —N/a | |
| 31 Jan 2025 | CF | (Serbia) Komnen Andrić | (Croatia) Lokomotiva Zagreb | Loan (until 26/6/2025) | —N/a | |
| 2 Feb 2025 | CF | (Croatia) Stipe Perica | (Romania) Dinamo București | Released (mutual consent) | Free | |
| 3 Feb 2025 | RB | (Croatia) Ivan Smolčić | (Italy) Como | Transfer | €1,600,000 | |
| 5 Feb 2025 | RW | (Croatia) Marco Pašalić | (United States) Orlando City | Transfer | €4,800,000 | |
| 7 Feb 2025 | LB | (Croatia) Marijan Čabraja | TBC | Released (mutual consent) | Free | |
| 13 Feb 2025 | CB | (Croatia) Bruno Burčul | (Croatia) Opatija | Dual registration | —N/a | |
| 13 Feb 2025 | DM | (Croatia) Andro Babić | (Croatia) Opatija | Dual registration | —N/a | |
| 14 Feb 2025 | RW | (North Macedonia) Matej Momčilovski | (Slovenia) Brinje Grosuplje | Loan (until 30/6/2025) | —N/a | |
| 17 Feb 2025 | GK | (Croatia) Domagoj Ivan Marić | (Croatia) Karlovac 1919 | Loan (until 26/6/2025) | —N/a | |
| 17 Feb 2025 | LW | (Croatia) Dominik Simčić | (Croatia) BSK Bijelo Brdo | Loan (until 30/6/2025) | —N/a | |

Source: Glasilo Hrvatskog nogometnog saveza

Spending: ▼€500,000
Income: ▲€21,300,000
Expenditure: ▲€20,800,000
