= Jakupović =

Jakupović (Bosnian pronunciation: [jakǔːpoʋitɕ]) is a Bosnian surname. Notable people with the surname include:

- Arnel Jakupović (born 1998), Austrian footballer
- Dalila Jakupović (born 1991), Slovenian tennis player of Bosnian descent
- Ajdin Jakupović (born 1990), Swedish-Bosnian entrepreneur
- Eldin Jakupović (born 1984), Swiss-Bosnian footballer
- Alexandros Jakupovic (born 1981), Greek former tennis player of Greek and Bosnian descent
