= Nikola Čavlina =

Croatian association football player

Personal information
- Date of birth: 2 June 2002 (age 24)
- Place of birth: Zagreb, Croatia
- Height: 1.92 m (6 ft 4 in)
- Position: Goalkeeper

Team information
- Current team: Wieczysta Kraków (on loan from Dinamo Zagreb)
- Number: 26

Youth career
- –2015: Lokomotiva
- 2015–2020: Dinamo Zagreb

Senior career*
Years	Team	Apps	(Gls)
2020-2022	Dinamo Zagreb II	38	(0)
2021–2022	Dinamo Zagreb	0	(0)
2022–2024	Lokomotiva Zagreb	63	(0)
2024–	Dinamo Zagreb	3	(0)
2024–2025	→ Osijek (loan)	4	(0)
2025–2026	→ Como (loan)	0	(0)
2026–	→ Wieczysta Kraków (loan)	0	(0)

International career
2016	Croatia U14	2	(0)
2018	Croatia U16	2	(0)
2018	Croatia U17	1	(0)
2021	Croatia U19	1	(0)
2021	Croatia U20	1	(0)
2022–2024	Croatia U21	12	(0)
- * Club domestic league appearances and goals as of 21:22, 13 July 2026 (UTC)

Nikola Čavlina (born 2 June 2002) is a Croatian professional footballer who plays as a goalkeeper for Ekstraklasa club Wieczysta Kraków, on loan from SuperSport HNL club Dinamo Zagreb.

== Club career ==
In September 2020, Čavlina signed a professional contract with Dinamo Zagreb.

On 13 July 2026, he joined Polish top-tier newcomers Wieczysta Kraków on a season-long loan, with an option to buy.

== International career ==
He has been capped for various Croatian youth national teams.

== Personal life ==
Nikola's father is Silvije Čavlina.

== Career statistics ==
As of match played 15 February 2025

Appearances and goals by club, season and competition
Club	Season	League			National cup (Note: Includes Croatian Cup)		Europe		Other		Total	
Club	Season	Division	Apps	Goals	Apps	Goals	Apps	Goals	Apps	Goals	Apps	Goals
Dinamo Zagreb II	2020–21	First Football League	12	0	—		—		—		12	0
Dinamo Zagreb II	2021–22	First Football League	26	0	—		—		—		26	0
Dinamo Zagreb II	Total		38	0	—		—		—		38	0
Dinamo Zagreb	2020–21	Croatian Football League	0	0	0	0	0	0	—		0	0
Dinamo Zagreb	2021–22	Croatian Football League	0	0	0	0	0	0	—		0	0
Dinamo Zagreb	2022–23	Croatian Football League	0	0	0	0	0	0	0	0	0	0
Dinamo Zagreb	Total		0	0	0	0	0	0	0	0	0	0
Lokomotiva Zagreb	2022–23	Croatian Football League	30	0	3	0	—		—		33	0
Lokomotiva Zagreb	2023–24	Croatian Football League	33	0	2	0	—		—		35	0
Lokomotiva Zagreb	Total		63	0	5	0	—		—		68	0
Dinamo Zagreb	2024–25	Croatian Football League	3	0	0	0	—		—		3	0
Osijek (loan)	2024–25	Croatian Football League	4	0	1	0	4 (Note: Appearances in UEFA Conference League)	0	—		9	0
Como (loan)	2025–26	Serie A	0	0	0	0	—		—		9	0
Wieczysta Kraków (loan)	2026–27	Ekstraklasa	0	0	0	0	—		—		0	0
Career total			108	0	6	0	4	0	0	0	113	0
