= Roko Jurišić =

Croatian footballer

Personal information
- Date of birth: September 28, 2001 (age 25)
- Place of birth: Zagreb, Croatia
- Height: 1.73 m (5 ft 8 in)
- Position: Left-back

Team information
- Current team: Estoril Praia
- Number: 21

Youth career
- –2010: Samobor
- 2010–2016: Zagreb
- 2016–2020: Dinamo Zagreb

Senior career*
Years	Team	Apps	(Gls)
2020–2021	Dinamo Zagreb II	14	(0)
2021–2023	Rijeka	10	(0)
2022	→ Hrvatski Dragovoljac (loan)	15	(0)
2023	Ried	14	(0)
2023–2024	Mura	16	(1)
2024–2026	Osijek	74	(4)
2026–	Estoril Praia	0	(0)

International career
2016	Croatia U16	2	(0)
2018	Croatia U17	3	(1)
2018–2019	Croatia U18	5	(0)
2019–2020	Croatia U19	9	(1)
2022	Croatia U20	3	(0)
- * Club domestic league appearances and goals as of 5 September 2026

Roko Jurišić (born 28 September 2001) is a Croatian professional footballer who plays as a defender for Primeira Liga club Estoril Praia.

== Club career ==
Born in Zagreb, Jurišić graduated from the youth academy of Dinamo Zagreb and went on to represent the reserve side before joining Rijeka on 22 January 2021. On 15 January 2022, he was loaned out to Hrvatski Dragovoljac for the remainder of the season.

On 30 December 2022, Jurišić moved abroad for the first time, and joined Austrian club SV Ried. Following a season with Slovenian club Mura, he returned to Croatia, joining top-flight club NK Osijek on 3 January 2024.
