= Emin Hasić =

Swedish footballer (born 2003)

Personal information
- Date of birth: 8 February 2003 (age 23)
- Height: 1.91 m (6 ft 3 in)
- Position: Defender

Team information
- Current team: NK Osijek
- Number: 33

Youth career
- –2020: BK Häcken
- 2021–2023: US Lecce

Senior career*
| Years | Team | Apps | (Gls) |
| 2023–2024 | IFK Värnamo | 15 | (0) |
| 2024– | NK Osijek | 35 | (2) |

International career
| 2018–2020 | Sweden U17 | 10 | (0) |
| 2021 | Sweden U19 | 1 | (0) |
| 2023–2024 | Sweden U21 | 5 | (1) |
- * Club domestic league appearances and goals as of 15 June 2026

Emin Hasić (born 8 February 2003) is a Swedish footballer who plays as a central defender for NK Osijek in the Croatian Football League.

Hasić played for BK Häcken's academy when several other clubs showed their interest. IFK Norrköping had a transfer bid rejected before Häcken accepted an offer from US Lecce. Hasić joined their Primavera team in the winter of 2021. While at Lecce, Hasic sat on the bench three times in the 2021-22 Serie B as well as one 2021-22 Coppa Italia match. He was also a youth international for Sweden between 2018 and 2021.

After his contract with Lecce expired, Hasić returned to Sweden and signed for Allsvenskan team IFK Värnamo. Hasić made his senior debut for Värnamo on 1 October 2023. He was also selected for Sweden U21. After less than one year in Värnamo, the club received million-krone bids from Balkan clubs including FK Sarajevo and NK Osijek, with the latter eventually signing the player. Hasić knew NK Osijek's new manager Federico Coppitelli from their mutual time in Lecce. It did not take long before Hasić was among the NK Osijek players with the most minutes in the 2024–25 Croatian Football League.
