= Ricuenio Kewal =

Dutch football player (born 2002)

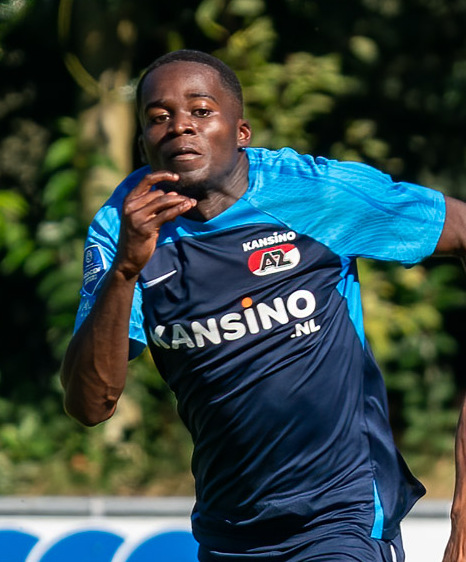

Personal information
- Date of birth: 6 June 2002 (age 24)
- Place of birth: Amsterdam, Netherlands
- Height: 1.75 m (5 ft 9 in)
- Position: Winger

Team information
- Current team: Osijek

Youth career
- 2015–2021: AZ Alkmaar

Senior career*
Years	Team	Apps	(Gls)
2021–2024	Jong AZ	70	(8)
2024–2025	Osijek	2	(0)

International career
2016	Netherlands U16	2	(0)
- * Club domestic league appearances and goals as of 19 December 2024

Ricuenio Kewal (born 6 June 2002) is a Dutch footballer who last played as a winger for Croatian club Osijek in the Prva HNL.

== Club career ==
He was born in Amsterdam, Netherlands. He played as a youngster at Amsterdamsche FC prior to joining the football academy at AZ Alkmaar in 2015. After progressing through the youth ranks and age-group levels, Kewal did enough to earn a professional contract with AZ Alkmaar, signing with the club on 19 June 2021. Kewal made his professional debut in the Eerste Divisie for Jong AZ against Almere City in a 2–1 victory on 9 August 2021.

On 26 June 2024, Kewal signed a two-year contract with Croatian club Osijek after he had reportedly been monitored for months previously by their sporting director Jose Boto. He made his debut in the Croatian Football League in a 2–1 home defeat to Dynamo Zagreb on 11 August 2024. He was an unused substitute as the club were knocked out via a penalty shoot-out in that season's UEFA Conference League against Azerbaijani club Zira FK. However, in January 2025 it seemed that Kewal might have suffering from some physical discomfort whilst completing club training and subsequently underwent a health check-up. After thorough examination at UAMC Amsterdam in March 2025 It was found that there was no longer a sport restriction.

== International career ==
Kewal played two matches for the Dutch under-16 national team.

== Personal life ==
He is of Surinamese descent.
