= Alessandro Tuia =

Italian footballer (born 1990)

Personal information
- Date of birth: 8 June 1990 (age 36)
- Place of birth: Civita Castellana, Italy
- Height: 1.90 m (6 ft 3 in)
- Position: Centre-back

Team information
- Current team: Flaminia

Youth career
- 1999–2000: Flaminia
- 2000–2009: Lazio

Senior career*
Years	Team	Apps	(Gls)
2009–2011	Lazio	1	(0)
2009–2011	→ Monza (loan)	42	(0)
2011–2012	Foligno	25	(0)
2012–2018	Salernitana	106	(2)
2018–2021	Benevento	53	(4)
2021–2023	Lecce	26	(1)
2023–2024	Cremonese	4	(0)
2024–2025	Osijek	18	(0)
2025–	Flaminia	5	(0)

International career^{‡}
2005–2006	Italy U16	8	(1)
2005–2007	Italy U17	23	(0)
- * Club domestic league appearances and goals as of 4 March 2026 ‡ National team caps and goals as of 29 March 2007

Alessandro Tuia (born 8 June 1990) is an Italian professional footballer who plays as a centre-back for Serie D club Flaminia.

== Club career ==
Tuia is a product of the Lazio youth academy and former captain of the Primavera youth team, being invited to train with the senior side in the 2008-09 season. He made his Serie A debut on 31 May 2009, when he came off the bench in the second half of Lazio's 2–0 defeat to Juventus in the Stadio Olimpico di Torino.

In the summer 2009 he has been loaned to Lega Pro Prima Divisione (Italian third tier) club Monza, in order to gain first team experience. The loan was extended in summer 2010.

In August 2011, he joined Foligno in the Lega Pro Prima Divisione in co-ownership deal and at the end of the season, he came back to Lazio, and then he was immediately sold to Salernitana in another co-ownership deal.

In June 2014 Lazio gave up the remain 50% registration rights of Tuia.

On 5 June 2018, Tuia signed for Benevento for free.

On 14 June 2021, he signed a contract with Lecce for a term of two years with an optional third year.

On 17 October 2023, Tuia joined Serie B club Cremonese on a contract until the end of the season.

On 29 August 2024, Tuia signed with Osijek in Croatia, which is managed by Italian coach Federico Coppitelli.

== International career ==
Tuia was the captain of the Italia U17 national team.
