= Lamine Ba (footballer, born 1997) =

Association football player

Personal information
- Date of birth: 24 August 1997 (age 29)
- Place of birth: Villepinte, France
- Height: 1.88 m (6 ft 2 in)
- Position: Defender

Team information
- Current team: Śląsk Wrocław
- Number: 5

Youth career
- 2003–2012: CSL Aulnay
- 2012–2015: Guignamp
- 2015–2016: Paris Saint-Germain
- 2017: Virtus Entella

Senior career*
Years	Team	Apps	(Gls)
2014–2015	Guingamp B	1	(0)
2015–2016	Paris Saint-Germain B	2	(0)
2017	Virtus Entella	0	(0)
2017–2020	Doxa	33	(0)
2020–2022	Progrès Niederkorn	54	(3)
2022–2026	Varaždin	83	(1)
2026–	Śląsk Wrocław	24	(0)

International career^{‡}
2022–	Mauritania	34	(1)
- * Club domestic league appearances and goals as of 15:08, 9 November 2026 (UTC) ‡ National team caps and goals as of 23:30, 17 November 2026 (UTC)

Lamine Ba (born 24 August 1997) is a professional footballer who plays as a defender for Ekstraklasa club Śląsk Wrocław. Born in France, he plays for the Mauritania national team.

== Club career ==
Ba is a graduate of the youth academy of Guingamp, he joined Paris Saint-Germain in the summer of 2015. He made his debut in an UEFA Youth League match against Real Madrid. During the same match, he was scouted by scouts of English club Liverpool. On 15 February 2017, he joined Italian club Virtus Entella on a free transfer.

On 24 July 2017, Ba signed for Cypriot club Doxa. He was assigned the number 4 jersey.

== International career ==
On 26 March 2022, Ba made his first appearance for the Mauritania national team in a 2–1 friendly win over Mozambique. He scored the winning goal in stoppage time.

== Personal life ==
Lamine is the younger brother of fellow Mauritania national football team player El Hadji Ba.

== Career statistics ==
=== International ===
As of match played 17 November 2026

Appearances and goals by national team and year
National team	Year	Apps	Goals
Mauritania
Mauritania	2022	4	1
Mauritania	2023	2	0
Mauritania	2024	13	0
Mauritania	2025	9	0
Mauritania	2026	6	0
Total		34	1

Scores and results list Mauritania's goal tally first, score column indicates score after each Ba goal.

List of international goals scored by Lamine Ba
No.	Date	Venue	Opponent	Score	Result	Competition
1	26 March 2022	Cheikha Ould Boïdiya Stadium, Nouakchott, Mauritania	Mozambique	2–1	2–1	Friendly
