= Pedro Lima (footballer, born 2003) =

Brazilian footballer

Personal information
- Full name: Pedro Lima Barros
- Date of birth: 27 March 2003 (age 23)
- Place of birth: Brasília, Brazil
- Height: 1.84 m (6 ft 0 in)
- Position: Defensive midfielder

Team information
- Current team: Sporting CP
- Number: 21

Youth career
- 2016–2023: Palmeiras

Senior career*
Years	Team	Apps	(Gls)
2023–2025	Palmeiras	1	(0)
2023–2024	→ Norwich City (loan)	0	(0)
2024–2025	→ Osijek (loan)	26	(2)
2025–2026	AVS	26	(4)
2026–	Sporting CP	0	(0)

International career^{‡}
2022–2023	Brazil U20	2	(0)
- * Club domestic league appearances and goals as of 18 May 2026 ‡ National team caps and goals as of 13:54, 27 April 2023 (UTC)

Pedro Lima Barros (born 27 March 2003), known as Pedro Lima, is a Brazilian footballer who plays as a defensive midfielder for Primeira Liga club Sporting CP.

== Club career ==
Born in Brasília, Federal District, Pedro Lima moved to São José dos Campos, São Paulo at the age of ten, and joined Palmeiras' youth setup in 2016, aged 12. On 15 September 2022, he renewed his contract until the end of 2024.

Pedro Lima made his first team debut on 5 April 2023, coming on as a second-half substitute for Mayke in a 3–1 away loss against Bolívar, for the year's Copa Libertadores.

On 23 August 2023, Pedro Lima signed for EFL Championship club Norwich City on loan until the end of the English football season however he never made a Senior appearance for The Club.

As of 2026 he plays for Sporting CP in Portugal.

== Career statistics ==
As of 27 April 2023.

Club	Season	League			State League		Cup		Continental		Other		Total	
Club	Season	Division	Apps	Goals	Apps	Goals	Apps	Goals	Apps	Goals	Apps	Goals	Apps	Goals
Palmeiras	2023	Série A	0	0	—		0	0	1 (Note: Appearance(s) in Copa Libertadores)	0	—		1	0
Norwich City (loan)	2023–24	EFL Championship	0	0	—		0	0	—		0	0	0	0
Career total			0	0	0	0	0	0	1	0	0	0	1	0

== Honours ==
Palmeiras

- Copa São Paulo de Futebol Júnior: 2022, 2023
- Campeonato Brasileiro Sub-20: 2022
- Copa do Brasil Sub-20: 2022
- Supercopa do Brasil Sub-20: 2022
