= Arnel Jakupović =

Austrian footballer

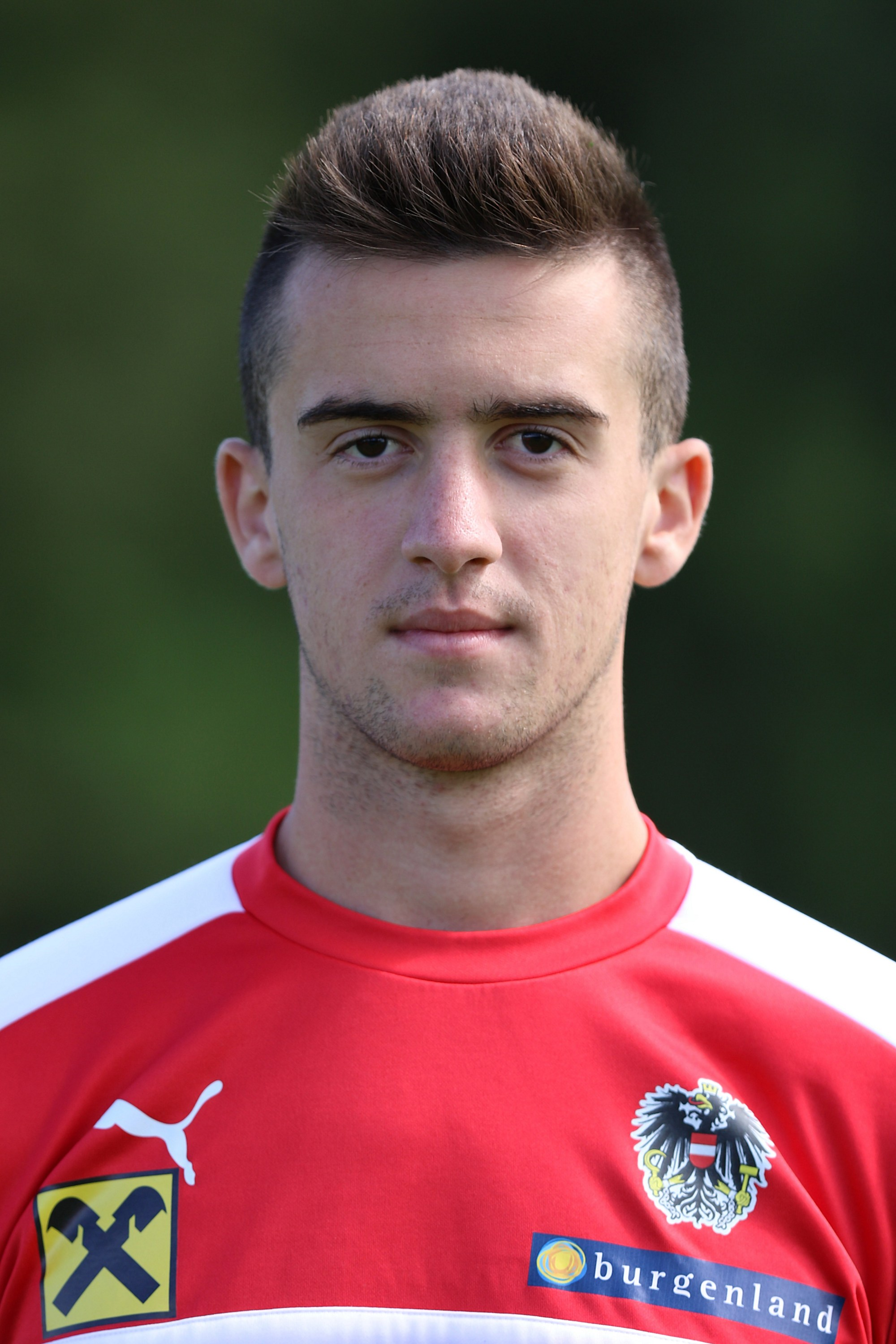
- Jakupović with Austria U21 in 2017

Personal information
- Date of birth: 29 May 1998 (age 28)
- Place of birth: Vienna, Austria
- Height: 1.86 m (6 ft 1 in)
- Position: Forward

Team information
- Current team: Vitória de Guimarães
- Number: 9

Youth career
- 2003–2005: ASV Asparn/Zaya
- 2005–2009: FC Stadlau
- 2009–2015: Austria Wien

Senior career*
Years	Team	Apps	(Gls)
2015	Austria Wien II	5	(0)
2015–2017	Middlesbrough	0	(0)
2017–2020	Empoli	5	(0)
2018	→ Juventus (loan)	0	(0)
2019	→ Sturm Graz (loan)	6	(0)
2019–2020	→ Domžale (loan)	30	(11)
2020–2023	Domžale	80	(21)
2023–2024	Maribor	46	(24)
2024–2026	Osijek	61	(14)
2026–	Vitória de Guimarães	2	(0)

International career
2013	Austria U16	6	(2)
2014–2015	Austria U17	11	(3)
2015–2017	Austria U19	16	(12)
2016–2019	Austria U21	16	(6)
- * Club domestic league appearances and goals as of 12 September 2026

Arnel Jakupović (born 29 May 1998) is an Austrian footballer who plays as a forward for Primeira Liga club Vitória de Guimarães.

== Club career ==
On 21 July 2020, Jakupović moved to Domžale on a permanent basis.

Jakupović finished the 2023–24 season with 17 goals, helping his club Maribor to a second-place finish. For his performances, he was named in the Slovenian PrvaLiga Team of the Season.

On 30 August 2024, Jakupović joined Croatian Football League club Osijek in a permanent transfer worth a reported €1 million.

On 2 September 2026, Jakupović signed a three-year contract with Vitória de Guimarães in Portugal.

== Personal life ==
Born in Austria, Jakupović is of Bosnian descent.

== Career statistics ==
As of match played 2 February 2025

Appearances and goals by club, season and competition
Club	Season	League			National cup (Note: Includes Slovenian Football Cup, Croatian Football Cup)		Europe		Total	
Club	Season	Division	Apps	Goals	Apps	Goals	Apps	Goals	Apps	Goals
Empoli	2016–17	Serie A	1	0	0	0	—		1	0
Empoli	2017–18	Serie B	4	0	0	0	—		4	0
Empoli	Total		5	0	0	0	—		5	0
Sturm Graz (loan)	2018–19	Austrian Bundesliga	6	0	0	0	—		6	0
Domžale (loan)	2019–20	Slovenian PrvaLiga	30	11	2	2	—		32	13
Domžale	2020–21	Slovenian PrvaLiga	27	7	3	1	—		30	8
Domžale	2021–22	Slovenian PrvaLiga	33	12	2	0	6 (Note: Appearances in UEFA Europa Conference League)	2	41	14
Domžale	2022–23	Slovenian PrvaLiga	20	2	3	2	—		23	4
Domžale	Total		80	21	8	3	6	2	94	26
Maribor	2022–23	Slovenian PrvaLiga	12	2	4	1	—		16	3
Maribor	2023–24	Slovenian PrvaLiga	29	17	3	3	6	2	38	22
Maribor	2024–25	Slovenian PrvaLiga	5	5	0	0	8 (Note: Two appearances in UEFA Europa League, six appearances and two goals in UEFA Conference League)	2	13	7
Maribor	Total		46	24	7	4	14	4	67	32
Osijek	2024–25	Croatian Football League	16	8	2	1	—		18	9
Career total			183	64	19	10	20	6	222	80

== Honours ==
Individual

- Slovenian PrvaLiga Player of the Month: July 2023, July 2024
