= Luka Mamić =

Croatian footballer

Personal information
- Date of birth: 2 August 2002 (age 24)
- Place of birth: Split, Croatia
- Height: 1.88 m (6 ft 2 in)
- Position: Midfielder

Team information
- Current team: Varaždin
- Number: 22

Youth career
- 2012–2021: Hajduk Split

Senior career*
Years	Team	Apps	(Gls)
2021–2023	Solin	56	(13)
2023–2024	Široki Brijeg	32	(6)
2024–	Varaždin	60	(11)
- * Club domestic league appearances and goals as of 15 June 2026

Luka Mamić (born 2 August 2002) is a Croatian professional footballer who plays as a midfielder for Varaždin .

== Club career ==
In the summer of 2023, Luka joined Široki Brijeg on a one-year contract from Solin. After one season in Bosnia, Luka returned to Croatia, signing for Varaždin in the summer of 2024.

== Personal life ==
Luka is also a citizen of Bosnia and Herzegovina.
