= Stefan Perić =

Austrian footballer

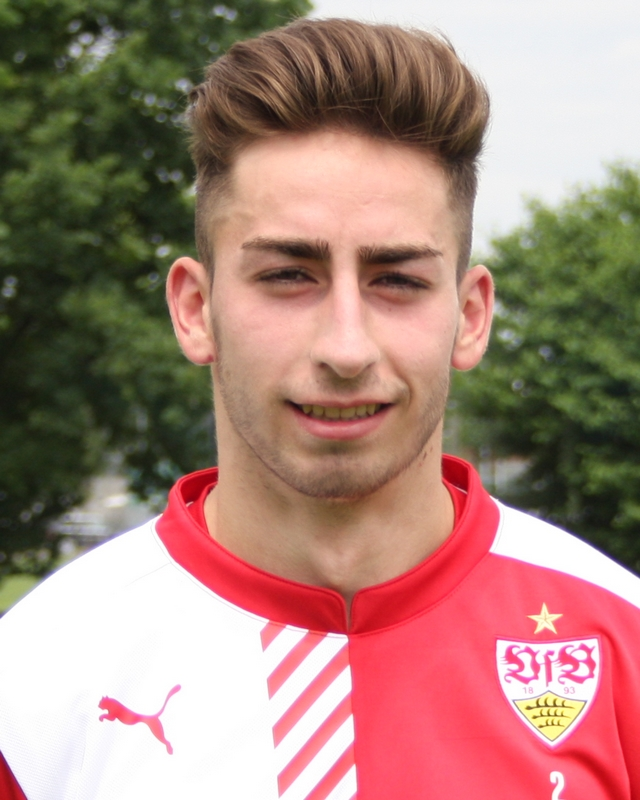

Personal information
- Date of birth: 13 February 1997 (age 29)
- Place of birth: Salzburg, Austria
- Height: 1.85 m (6 ft 1 in)
- Position: Centre back

Team information
- Current team: Gorica
- Number: 45

Youth career
- 2006–2014: FC Red Bull Salzburg

Senior career*
| Years | Team | Apps | (Gls) |
| 2014–2015 | FC Liefering | 3 | (0) |
| 2015–2018 | VfB Stuttgart II | 65 | (1) |
| 2018–2019 | Wacker Innsbruck II | 4 | (0) |
| 2018–2019 | Wacker Innsbruck | 7 | (0) |
| 2019–2020 | Wolfsberger AC II | 5 | (0) |
| 2019–2021 | Wolfsberger AC | 7 | (0) |
| 2021–2025 | Šibenik | 113 | (2) |
| 2025– | Gorica | 29 | (0) |

International career^{‡}
| 2012 | Austria U16 | 3 | (0) |
| 2013–2014 | Austria U17 | 16 | (1) |
| 2014 | Austria U18 | 1 | (0) |
| 2014–2016 | Austria U19 | 16 | (0) |
| 2019 | Austria U21 | 1 | (0) |
- * Club domestic league appearances and goals as of 15 June 2026 ‡ National team caps and goals as of 25 March 2019

Stefan Perić (born 13 February 1997) is an Austrian footballer who plays as a defender for Croatian club Gorica. His parents emigrated from Bosnia and Herzegovina to Austria.

== Club career ==
On 25 July 2015 Perić played his first match for VfB Stuttgart II in the 3. Liga against Dynamo Dresden.

On 18 June 2021, he joined HNK Šibenik in Croatia.

He then moved to Bundesliga club Wolfsberger AC for the 2019/20 season, where he received a contract running until June 2021. In two seasons with the Carinthian club, he made seven Bundesliga appearances. For the 2021/22 season, the defender moved to Croatia to HNK Šibenik. With Šibenik, he was relegated from the 1st HNL in 2023, but in 2024 he managed to get promoted again as champions of the 2nd HNL. In the 2024/25 season, Šibenik was relegated again. In total, he made 113 league appearances for the club.

After being relegated again, Perić moved to the first division club HNK Gorica for the 2025–26 season.
