= Bruno Bogojević =

Croatian footballer (born 1998)

Personal information
- Date of birth: 29 June 1998 (age 28)
- Place of birth: Koprivnica, Croatia
- Height: 1.86 m (6 ft 1 in)
- Position: Winger

Team information
- Current team: Gorica
- Number: 25

Youth career
- –2017: Slaven Belupo

Senior career*
Years	Team	Apps	(Gls)
2014	Slaven Belupo II	3	(3)
2016–2022	Slaven Belupo	131	(7)
2018	→ Novigrad (loan)	13	(3)
2022–2025	Rijeka	52	(3)
2026–	Gorica	16	(4)

International career^{‡}
2016	Croatia U19	2	(0)
2019–2020	Croatia U21	3	(0)
- * Club domestic league appearances and goals as of 15 June 2026 ‡ National team caps and goals as of 17 November 2020

Bruno Bogojević (born 29 June 1998) is a professional footballer who plays as a winger for Gorica. Born in Koprivnica, Bogojević represented local club Slaven Belupo 142 times before transferring to HNK Rijeka in 2022. He represented Croatia internationally at various youth levels.

His highlight while playing with Slaven was a game-winning goal against Dinamo Zagreb.

Bogojević has also played left back for Rijeka, notably in a game where he scored two goals against Lokomotiva in February 2024.

== Honours ==
Rijeka

- Croatian Football League: 2024–25
- Croatian Football Cup: 2024–25
