= Jovan Manev =

Macedonian footballer

Personal information
- Full name: Jovan Manev; Јован Манев
- Date of birth: 25 January 2001 (age 25)
- Place of birth: Kočani, Macedonia
- Height: 1.85 m (6 ft 1 in)
- Position: Centre-back

Youth career
- 2016–2017: Bregalnica Štip

Senior career*
Years	Team	Apps	(Gls)
2017–2018	Osogovo		
2018–2022	Bregalnica Štip	79	(7)
2022–2023	→ Adana Demirspor (loan)	8	(0)
2023–2025	Adana Demirspor	20	(1)
2023	→ Osijek (loan)	7	(0)
2025–2026	Rijeka	7	(0)
2025–2026	→ Novi Pazar (loan)	12	(0)

International career^{‡}
2019	North Macedonia U20	1	(1)
2021–2022	North Macedonia U21	8	(0)
2023–	North Macedonia	11	(1)
- * Club domestic league appearances and goals as of 31 May 2026 ‡ National team caps and goals as of 12 June 2025

Jovan Manev (Macedonian: Јован Манев; born 25 January 2001) is a Macedonian professional footballer who last played as a centre-back for the Serbian club Novi Pazar, on loan from HNK Rijeka, and North Macedonia national team.

== Career ==
Manev is a youth product of the academies of Osogovo and Bregalnica Štip, and began his career in North Macedonia with Bregalnica Štip in the 2021–22 season, making 30 appearances and scoring 2 goals in his debut season. On 3 July 2022, he signed with the Turkish club Adana Demirspor on loan for the 2022–23 season with an option to buy, which was taken. In September 2023, Manev was loaned to NK Osijek in Croatia, featuring in 7 league games for the club before getting injured. Manev's loan was brought to an end in December of the same year after the Turkish club decided to use the option to return him.

Manev was transferred in 2025 to the Croatian club NK Rijeka. Not having broken to the first team, he was loaned on to FK Novi Pazar in Serbia. Having spent a season there, his contract with Rijeka was terminated.

== International career ==
Manev is a youth international for North Macedonia, having played for the North Macedonia U21s. Manev made his senior international debut coming on as a 79th-minute substitute against Faroe Islands in a 1–0 win on 27 March 2023. He scored his first national team goal in the Euro 2024 qualifiers played against Malta on 12 September 2023.

== Honours ==
Rijeka

- Croatian Football League: 2024–25
- Croatian Football Cup: 2024–25
