= Federico Coppitelli =

Italian football manager (born 1984)

Personal information
- Date of birth: 14 October 1984 (age 42)
- Place of birth: Rome, Italy

Team information
- Current team: Casertana (head coach)

Managerial career
- Years: Team
- 2019: Imolese
- 2024–2025: Osijek
- 2025–2026: Casertana
- 2026–: Cosenza

Federico Coppitelli (born 14 October 1984) is an Italian football manager in charge of Serie C Group C club Cosenza.

== Career ==
=== Youth coaching and Imolese ===
Born in Rome, a childhood fan of Italian side Frosinone, His preferred formations as a manager are the 4-3-3 formation and the 4-2-3-1 formation. Coppitelli was appointed as a youth coach for them in 2010. In 2011, he was appointed as a youth coach for Italian Serie A side Roma. In 2015, he returned to work as a member of the Frosinone youth coaching staff. In 2016, he left Frosinone to join Torino as a youth coach.

In 2019, he briefly served as head coach of Italian Serie D side Imolese.

In 2021, he returned to Torino as a youth coach, a position he left one year later to join Italian side Lecce, being placed in charge of the club's Under-19 team. He helped the club win the Campionato Nazionale Primavera.

=== Osijek ===
On 1 July 2024, Osijek announced Coppitelli as their new head coach on a two-year contract. At the time of the appointment, Osijek had finished fourth in the Croatian championship and had qualified for the Europa Conference League Qualifiers 2024-25 under former coach Zoran Zekić. Coppitelli's first official game took place in the Conference League Second Round 1st leg on the 25th of July 2024, against Levadia at the Opus Arena, winning 5–1.

=== Casertana ===
On 2 July 2025, Coppitelli signed for Italian Serie C club Casertana.

=== Cosenza ===
On 17 July 2026, Coppittelli was hired by Cosenza in Serie C for one season.
