= 1987–88 NK Dinamo Zagreb season =

Dinamo Zagreb
1987–88 season
- President: Marijan Cuculić
- Manager: Miroslav Blažević
- Stadium: Stadion Maksimir
- 1. Federal League: 4th place
- Marshal Tito Cup: First round (R32)
- Top goalscorer: League: Haris Škoro (14); All: Zvonimir Boban (14); Haris Škoro (14)
- Highest home attendance: 30,810 vs Red Star
- Lowest home attendance: 3,828 vs Sloboda Tuzla
- Average home league attendance: 13,766

The 1987–88 season was the 42nd season of competitive football played by Dinamo Zagreb.

== First Federal League ==
=== Results summary ===
Overall								Home						Away					
Pld	W	D	L	GF	GA	GD	Pts	W	D	L	GF	GA	GD	W	D	L	GF	GA	GD
34	16	10	8	55	36	+19	42	14	1	2	40	14	+26	2	9	6	15	22	–7

=== Matches ===
M	Date	Opponents	Venue	Result	Score F–A	Dinamo scorers	Attendance	Ref
1	2 August 1987	Velež	H	W	3–0	Škoro 59', 79' (2) Boban 74'	18,630	
2	9 August 1987	Čelik	A	D	1–1	Kasalo 31'	12,112	
3	16 August 1987	Vardar	H	W	3–1	Cvjetković 53', Arslanović 62', Matić 88'	12,080	
4	23 August 1987	Red Star	A	D	0–0		35,970	
5	6 September 1987	Rad	H	W	3–1	Cvjetković 32', 82' (2) Vujović 49'	13,853	
6	13 September 1987	Osijek	A	D	1–1	Boban 19'	16,600	
7	20 September 1987	Sutjeska Nikšić	H	W	2–1	Boban 28', 34' (2)	15,711	
8	27 September 1987	Hajduk Split	A	W	2–0	Bogdanović 28', Mlinarić 67'	23,129	
9	4 October 1987	Priština	H	L	1–2	Cvjetković 64'	16,090	
10	7 October 1987	Radnički Niš	A	L	1–3	Škoro 57'	5,000	
11	17 October 1987	Željezničar	H	W	3–0	Mlinarić 26', Cvjetković 40', Škoro 58'	5,059	
12	25 October 1987	Partizan	H	L	1–2	Bogdanović 12'	27,632	
13	1 November 1987	Rijeka	A	D	0–0		12,531	
14	15 November 1987	Sloboda Tuzla	H	W	2–1	Boban 20', Škoro 69'	3,828	
15	22 November 1987	Sarajevo	A	L	0–1		1,066	
16	29 November 1987	Budućnost	H	W	2–1	Škoro 6', Dimitrijević 11'	8,000	
17	6 December 1987	Vojvodina	A	L	2–3	Matić 13', Škoro 54'	4,601	
18	6 March 1988	Velež	A	D	0–0		10,410	
19	13 March 1988	Čelik	H	W	2–0	Boban 55', Škoro 86'	8,898	
20	20 March 1988	Vardar	A	L	0–4		12,000	
21	27 March 1988	Red Star	H	W	1–0	Škoro 24'	30,810	
22	2 April 1988	Rad	A	W	3–0	Deverić 2', Matić 38', Škoro 47'	2,756	
23	10 April 1988	Osijek	H	D	1–1	Boban 50', 87' (2), Kasalo 77'	8,422	
24	17 April 1988	Sutjeska Nikšić	A	L	0–3		6,231	
25	20 April 1988	Hajduk Split	H	D	1–1	Kasalo 42'	29,576	
26	24 April 1988	Priština	A	D	0–0		6,640	
27	1 May 1988	Radnički Niš	H	W	1–0	Čapljić 12' (pen.)	12,000	
28	4 May 1988	Željezničar	A	D	0–0		12,000	
29	8 May 1988	Partizan	A	L	1–2	Boban 25'	18,696	
30	15 May 1988	Rijeka	H	W	3–2	Škoro 55', 62' (2), Boban 39' (pen.)	7,941	
31	22 May 1988	Sloboda Tuzla	A	D	1–1	Munjaković 29'	3,169	
32	29 May 1988	Sarajevo	H	W	4–1	Matić 70', 85' (2), Boban 44' (pen.), Škoro 87' (pen.)	7,499	
33	8 June 1988	Budućnost	A	D	3–3	Agić 14', Pejović 45' (o.g.), Deverić 89'	8,000	
34	12 June 1988	Vojvodina	H	W	5–0	Boban 65', 73' (2), Agić 77', Škoro 32', Arslanović 42'	8,000	

=== Classification ===
Pos	Team	Pld	W	D	L	GF	GA	GD	Pts	Qualification or relegation
2	Partizan	34	17	10	7	62	37	+25	44	Qualification for UEFA Cup first round
3	Velež	34	15	12	7	61	34	+27	42	Qualification for UEFA Cup first round
4	Dinamo Zagreb	34	16	10	8	55	36	+19	42	Qualification for UEFA Cup first round
5	Sloboda Tuzla	34	14	10	10	53	41	+12	38	
6	Vardar	34	15	7	12	37	40	−3	37	

Source: rsssf.org
Rules for classification: 1) points; 2) goal difference; 3) number of goals scored.

=== Results by round ===
Round	1	2	3	4	5	6	7	8	9	10	11	12	13	14	15	16	17	18	19	20	21	22	23	24	25	26	27	28	29	30	31	32	33	34
Ground	H	A	H	A	H	A	H	A	H	A	H	H	A	H	A	H	A	A	H	A	H	A	H	A	H	A	H	A	A	H	A	H	A	H
Result	W	D	W	D	W	D	W	W	L	L	W	L	D	W	L	W	L	D	W	L	W	W	W	L	D	D	W	D	L	W	D	W	D	W
Position	1	2	1	2	1	1	1	1	1	2	1	1	3	2	4	2	5	5	4	6	5	3	2	3	4	3	3	4	5	4	4	4	4	4

Updated to match(es) played on 12 June 1988. Source: rsssf.org
A = Away; H = Home; W = Win; D = Draw; L = Loss

== Marshal Tito Cup ==
Date	Round	Opponents	Home / Away	Result (F – A)	Dinamo scorers
13 Aug 1987	First round	Spartak	A	1 – 1 (3 – 2 p)	

== Players ==
=== Squad statistics ===
Key

Pos = Playing position

Nat. = Nationality

DoB (Age) = Date of birth (age)

Apps = Appearances

GK = Goalkeeper

DF = Defender

MF = Midfielder

FW = Forward

Numbers indicate starting appearances + appearances as substitute. Goals column shows total goals scored, numbers in brackets indicate penalties scored.
Players with name struck through and marked † left the club during the playing season.
Age as of 2 August 1987, first matchday of the season.

Pos.	Nat.	Name	DoB (Age)	League		Cup		Total	
Pos.	Nat.	Name	DoB (Age)	Apps	Goals	Apps	Goals	Apps	Goals
MF	(Socialist Federal Republic of Yugoslavia)	Zvonimir Boban	8 October 1968 (aged 18)	30	13 (2)	1	1	31	14
FW	(Socialist Federal Republic of Yugoslavia)	Haris Škoro	2 September 1962 (aged 24)	28	14 (1)		0	29	14
DF	(Socialist Federal Republic of Yugoslavia)	Davor Matić	28 October 1959 (aged 27)	27+2	5		0	30	5
DF	(Socialist Federal Republic of Yugoslavia)	Mladen Munjaković	20 July 1961 (aged 26)	25+3	1		0	29	1
MF	(Socialist Federal Republic of Yugoslavia)	Zoran Dimitrijević	28 February 1962 (aged 25)	25+2	1		0	28	1
DF	(Socialist Federal Republic of Yugoslavia)	Mustafa Arslanović	24 February 1960 (aged 27)	24+1	2	0	0	25	2
DF	(Socialist Federal Republic of Yugoslavia)	Vlado Kasalo	11 November 1962 (aged 24)	24	3	0	0	24	3
DF	(Socialist Federal Republic of Yugoslavia)	Željko Cupan	30 December 1963 (aged 23)	23+2	0	0	0	25	0
DF	(Socialist Federal Republic of Yugoslavia)	Damir Lesjak	31 March 1967 (aged 20)	22+4	0		0	27	0
GK	(Socialist Federal Republic of Yugoslavia)	Miralem Ibrahimović	19 January 1963 (aged 24)	22+3	0		0	26	0
DF	(Socialist Federal Republic of Yugoslavia)	Mirko Lulić	6 January 1962 (aged 25)	18+2	0	0	0	20	0
MF	(Socialist Federal Republic of Yugoslavia)	Marko Mlinarić	1 September 1960 (aged 26)	16	2		0	17	2
GK	(Socialist Federal Republic of Yugoslavia)	Marijan Vlak	23 October 1955 (aged 31)	11	0	0	0	11	0
FW	(Socialist Federal Republic of Yugoslavia)	Ivan Cvjetković	2 January 1960 (aged 27)	10+3	5		0	14	5
MF	(Socialist Federal Republic of Yugoslavia)	Dražen Besek	10 March 1963 (aged 24)	9+6	0	0	0	15	0
DF	(Socialist Federal Republic of Yugoslavia)	Darko Vujović	21 December 1962 (aged 24)	9+2	1		0	12	1
FW	(Socialist Federal Republic of Yugoslavia)	Stjepan Deverić	20 August 1961 (aged 25)	9	2	0	0	9	2
DF	(Socialist Federal Republic of Yugoslavia)	Vlado Čapljić	22 March 1962 (aged 25)	9	1 (1)	0	0	9	1
DF	(Socialist Federal Republic of Yugoslavia)	Zvjezdan Cvetković	18 April 1960 (aged 27)	6	0		0	7	0
FW	(Socialist Federal Republic of Yugoslavia)	Mustafa Agić	8 April 1966 (aged 21)	5+8	2	0	0	13	2
DF	(Socialist Federal Republic of Yugoslavia)	Dubravko Pavličić	28 November 1967 (aged 19)	5+4	0	0	0	9	0
FW	(Socialist Federal Republic of Yugoslavia)	Josip Bogdanović	21 October 1960 (aged 26)	4+3	2		0	8	2
DF	(Socialist Federal Republic of Yugoslavia)	Slavko Ištvanić	12 July 1966 (aged 21)	4	0	0	0	4	0
DF	(Socialist Federal Republic of Yugoslavia)	Muhamed Preljević	16 June 1964 (aged 23)	3+2	0	0	0	5	0
DF	(Socialist Federal Republic of Yugoslavia)	Željko Vuković	9 February 1962 (aged 25)	3+2	0		0	6	0
FW	(Socialist Federal Republic of Yugoslavia)	Dragan Lepinjica	15 August 1961 (aged 25)	2+5	0	0	0	7	0
GK	(Socialist Federal Republic of Yugoslavia)	Dražen Ladić	1 January 1963 (aged 24)	1	0	0	0	1	0
