= 2017–18 Croatian First Football League =

27th season of the Croatian First Football League

Hrvatski Telekom Prva liga
- Season: 2017–18
- Dates: 14 July 2017 – 19 May 2018
- Champions: Dinamo Zagreb
- Relegated: Cibalia
- Champions League: Dinamo Zagreb
- Europa League: Rijeka; Hajduk Split; Osijek
- Matches: 180
- Goals: 496 (2.76 per match)
- Top goalscorer: El Arabi Hillel Soudani (17)
- Biggest home win: Rijeka 7–0 Cibalia
- Biggest away win: Cibalia 0–5 Hajduk Split
- Highest scoring: Rijeka 7–0 Cibalia; Cibalia 2–5 Dinamo Zagreb; Lokomotiva 5–2 Slaven Belupo
- Longest winning run: Dinamo Zagreb (6)
- Longest unbeaten run: Dinamo Zagreb (21)
- Longest winless run: Slaven Belupo (11)
- Longest losing run: Cibalia, Istra 1961 (5)
- Highest attendance: 31,751; Hajduk Split 1–2 Dinamo Zagreb
- Lowest attendance: 80; Lokomotiva 2–3 Inter Zaprešić
- Total attendance: 530,638
- Average attendance: 2,948

The 2017–18 Croatian First Football League (also known as 1. HNL; officially styled Hrvatski Telekom Prva liga for sponsorship reasons) was the 27th season of the Croatian First Football League, the national championship for men's association football teams in Croatia, since its establishment in 1992. The season started on 14 July 2017 and ended on 19 May 2018. Rijeka were the defending champions, who have won their first Croatian league title and ended Dinamo Zagreb's consecutive 11-season reign the previous season. Dinamo Zagreb ultimately reclaimed the title by May 2018, their 19th since the league's inception, with Rijeka ending close second.

The league was contested by 10 teams.

== Teams ==
On 21 April 2017, Croatian Football Federation announced that the first stage of licensing procedure for 2017–18 season was complete. For the 2017–18 Prva HNL, only seven clubs were issued a top level license: Dinamo Zagreb, Hajduk Split, Inter Zaprešić, Lokomotiva, Osijek, Rijeka and Slaven Belupo. All of these clubs except Inter Zaprešić were also issued a license for participating in UEFA competitions. In the second stage of licensing, clubs that were not licensed in the first stage can appeal on the decision. On 23 May 2017, it was announced that all remaining Prva HNL clubs except RNK Split were granted top level license. Four teams from Druga HNL acquired the top level license: Gorica, Rudeš, Solin and NK Zagreb.

=== Stadia and locations ===
Team	City	Stadium	Capacity	Ref.
Cibalia	Vinkovci	Stadion HNK Cibalia	9,958	
Dinamo Zagreb	Zagreb	Maksimir	35,123	
Hajduk Split	Split	Poljud	35,000	
Inter Zaprešić	Zaprešić	ŠRC Zaprešić	5,228	
Istra 1961	Pula	Aldo Drosina	10,000	
Lokomotiva	Zagreb	Kranjčevićeva^{1}	8,850	
Osijek	Osijek	Gradski vrt	22,050	
Rijeka	Rijeka	Rujevica	8,191	
Rudeš	Zagreb	Kranjčevićeva^{1}	8,850	
Slaven Belupo	Koprivnica	Gradski stadion	3,205	

- ^{1} Lokomotiva and Rudeš host their home matches at Stadion Kranjčevićeva as their own grounds failed to get license for top level football. The stadium was originally the home ground of third-level side NK Zagreb.

=== Teams by county ===
Locations of teams in 2017–18 Prva HNL

Rank	Counties of Croatia	Number of teams	Club(s)
1	City of Zagreb	3	Dinamo Zagreb, Lokomotiva, and Rudeš
2	Istria	1	Istra 1961
2	Koprivnica-Križevci	1	Slaven
2	Osijek-Baranja	1	Osijek
2	Primorje-Gorski Kotar	1	Rijeka
2	Split-Dalmatia	1	Hajduk Split
2	Vukovar-Srijem	1	Cibalia
2	Zagreb County	1	Inter Zaprešić

=== Personnel and kits ===
Club	Chairman	Manager	Captain	Kit manufacturer	Sponsors
Cibalia	Josip Kuterovac	(Croatia) Davor Rupnik	(Croatia) Frane Vitaić	Jako	DOBRO
Dinamo Zagreb	Mirko Barišić	(Croatia) Nenad Bjelica	(North Macedonia) Arijan Ademi	adidas	
Hajduk Split	Ivan Kos	(Croatia) Željko Kopić	(Croatia) Zoran Nižić	Macron	Tommy
Inter Zaprešić	Branko Laljak	(Croatia) Samir Toplak	(Croatia) Tomislav Šarić	Joma	Veleučilište Baltazar Zaprešić
Istra 1961	Vacant	(Croatia) Darko Raić-Sudar	(Croatia) Aljoša Vojnović	Nike	Croatia Osiguranje
Lokomotiva	Tin Dolički	(Croatia) Goran Tomić	(Croatia) Ivan Šunjić	Nike	Crodux
Osijek	Ivan Meštrović	(Croatia) Zoran Zekić	(Croatia) Borna Barišić	Nike	DOBRO
Rijeka	Damir Mišković	(Slovenia) Matjaž Kek	(Croatia) Filip Bradarić	Jako	Sava Osiguranje
Rudeš	Ivan Knežević	(Spain) José Manuel Aira	(Croatia) Leonard Mesarić	Kelme	
Slaven Belupo	Hrvoje Kolarić	(Croatia) Tomislav Ivković	(Croatia) Vedran Purić	adidas	Belupo

=== Managerial changes ===
Team	Outgoing manager	Manner of departure	Date of vacancy	Replaced by	Date of appointment	Position in table
Istra 1961	(Croatia) Marijo Tot	Sacked	2 June 2017	(Croatia) Darko Raić-Sudar	2 June 2017	Pre-season
Rudeš	(Croatia) Igor Bišćan	Signed by Olimpija	2 June 2017	(Spain) Iñaki Alonso	10 June 2017	Pre-season
Dinamo Zagreb	(Bulgaria) Ivaylo Petev	Sacked	13 July 2017	(Croatia) Mario Cvitanović	13 July 2017	Pre-season
Slaven Belupo	(Croatia) Željko Kopić	Resigned	24 October 2017	(Croatia) Tomislav Ivković	26 October 2017	7th
Hajduk Split	(Spain) Joan Carrillo	Sacked	6 November 2017	(Croatia) Vik Lalić (caretaker)	6 November 2017	4th
Hajduk Split	(Croatia) Vik Lalić (caretaker)	Signing of Kopić	-	(Croatia) Željko Kopić	13 November 2017	4th
Lokomotiva	(Croatia) Mario Tokić	Removed from position	5 December 2017	(Croatia) Draženko Prskalo (caretaker)	5 December 2017	6th
Rudeš	(Spain) Iñaki Alonso	Removed from position	26 December 2017	(Croatia) Dinko Jeličić	27 December 2017	10th
Lokomotiva	(Croatia) Draženko Prskalo (caretaker)	Signing of Tomić	27 December 2017	(Croatia) Goran Tomić	27 December 2017	6th
Dinamo Zagreb	(Croatia) Mario Cvitanović	Resigned	10 March 2018	(Croatia) Nikola Jurčević	12 March 2018	1st
Rudeš	(Croatia) Dinko Jeličić	Sacked	10 March 2018	(Spain) José Manuel Aira	12 March 2018	10th
Cibalia	(Bosnia and Herzegovina) Mladen Bartolović	Sacked	19 March 2018	(Croatia) Davor Rupnik	19 March 2018	9th
Dinamo Zagreb	(Croatia) Nikola Jurčević	Sacked	15 May 2018	(Croatia) Nenad Bjelica	15 May 2018	1st
Rudeš	(Spain) José Manuel Aira	Signed by Sochaux	22 May 2018			8th

== League table ==
Pos	Team	Pld	W	D	L	GF	GA	GD	Pts	Qualification or relegation
1	Dinamo Zagreb (C)	36	22	7	7	68	34	+34	73	Qualification for the Champions League second qualifying round
2	Rijeka	36	22	4	10	75	32	+43	70	Qualification for the Europa League third qualifying round (Note: Since the winners of the 2017–18 Croatian Football Cup, Dinamo Zagreb, qualified for European competition based on league position, the spot awarded to the cup winners (Europa League third qualifying round) was passed to the runners-up, the spot awarded to the runners-up was passed to the third-placed team, and the spot awarded to the third-placed team was passed to the fourth-placed team.)
3	Hajduk Split	36	19	9	8	70	38	+32	66	Qualification for the Europa League second qualifying round
4	Osijek	36	14	14	8	53	38	+15	56	Qualification for the Europa League first qualifying round
5	Lokomotiva	36	14	9	13	47	48	−1	51	
6	Slaven Belupo	36	11	10	15	35	45	−10	43	
7	Inter Zaprešić	36	11	10	15	43	64	−21	43	
8	Rudeš	36	10	10	16	41	62	−21	40	
9	Istra 1961 (O)	36	6	9	21	28	60	−32	27	Qualification for the Relegation play-offs
10	Cibalia (R)	36	6	8	22	36	75	−39	26	Relegation to Croatian Second Football League

Source: PrvaHNL.hr
Rules for classification: 1) Points; 2) Head-to-head points; 3) Head-to-head goal difference; 4) Head-to-head goals scored (at home if two teams tied); 5) Goal difference; 6) Goals scored; 7) Play-off
(Note: Criteria 2–4 and 7 is only used if deciding champion, teams to international competition or teams for relegation and in that case criteria 6 will not be used).
(C) Champions; (O) Play-off winners; (R) Relegated

== Results ==
Each team plays home-and-away against every other team in the league twice, for a total of 36 matches each played.

Home \ Away	DIN	RIJ	HAJ	OSI	LOK	INT	SLA	RUD	IST	CIB	DIN	RIJ	HAJ	OSI	LOK	INT	SLA	RUD	IST	CIB
Dinamo Zagreb	—	3–1	3–1	1–1	2–0	1–0	2–0	3–2	2–0	4–0	—	0–1	0–1	0–1	1–4	3–1	1–0	2–0	5–1	1–0
Rijeka	0–2	—	1–2	1–2	2–1	0–0	2–0	4–1	2–0	7–0	4–1	—	3–1	1–0	3–1	5–1	2–0	3–0	4–0	5–1
Hajduk Split	2–2	0–2	—	1–1	2–2	2–0	1–0	2–3	2–0	2–1	1–2	1–1	—	1–1	1–0	5–0	0–1	1–0	3–2	4–0
Osijek	1–1	1–0	2–1	—	3–0	3–0	2–0	1–1	2–1	1–1	2–4	2–1	3–3	—	0–1	1–1	3–0	3–0	2–0	3–1
Lokomotiva	0–3	1–0	1–3	2–3	—	3–0	0–0	1–1	1–0	1–3	3–1	1–0	0–2	1–1	—	2–3	5–2	2–2	0–0	2–1
Inter Zaprešić	1–3	1–3	2–2	3–1	1–1	—	0–1	3–1	2–2	3–1	0–0	0–3	0–3	1–0	1–2	—	0–0	1–1	1–0	3–2
Slaven Belupo	0–1	1–1	0–0	1–1	1–0	1–2	—	2–2	2–0	2–1	2–2	1–3	0–0	2–1	2–2	3–3	—	2–0	1–0	2–0
Rudeš	1–1	1–5	0–4	1–1	0–1	0–2	1–2	—	1–0	1–1	1–0	4–2	2–1	1–0	1–2	2–0	2–0	—	2–1	3–2
Istra 1961	0–0	1–0	1–3	1–1	1–2	1–1	1–0	2–1	—	0–1	0–4	0–1	1–5	1–1	1–0	2–4	2–1	1–1	—	0–0
Cibalia	2–5	1–2	1–2	2–1	0–1	1–2	1–0	3–0	1–4	—	0–2	0–0	0–5	1–1	1–1	3–0	1–3	1–1	1–1	—

Source: Sportnet.hr
Legend: Blue = home team win; Yellow = draw; Red = away team win.
For upcoming matches, an "a" indicates there is an article about the rivalry between the two participants.

=== Positions by round ===
Team ╲ Round	1	2	3	4	5	6	7	8	9	10	11	12	13	14	15	16	17	18	19	20	21	22	23	24	25	26	27	28	29	30	31	32	33	34	35	36
Cibalia	7	10	10	10	8	7	6	6	7	8	8	9	8	8	9	8	8	8	8	9	9	9	9	9	9	9	9	9	10	10	10	10	10	10	10	10
Dinamo Zagreb	4	1	2	1	1	1	1	1	1	1	1	1	1	1	1	1	1	1	1	1	1	1	1	1	1	1	1	1	1	1	1	1	1	1	1	1
Hajduk Split	1	3	3	5	2	2	2	3	3	3	3	3	3	4	4	2	3	2	3	2	2	2	2	2	2	2	2	2	2	2	2	3	3	3	3	3
Inter Zaprešić	2	4	5	4	6	6	7	7	8	7	7	6	6	6	5	5	5	5	5	5	5	5	5	5	6	5	5	5	5	5	5	5	5	6	6	6
Istra 1961	9	7	9	9	9	9	10	9	10	10	10	8	9	9	8	9	9	9	9	8	8	8	8	8	8	8	8	8	9	9	9	9	9	9	9	9
Lokomotiva	8	9	8	7	7	8	8	8	6	6	6	5	5	5	6	6	6	6	6	6	6	7	7	7	7	7	7	7	6	6	6	6	6	5	5	5
Osijek	5	6	6	6	4	4	4	4	4	4	4	4	4	2	2	3	4	3	2	3	4	3	4	4	4	4	4	4	4	4	4	4	4	4	4	4
Rijeka	3	2	1	2	3	3	3	2	2	2	2	2	2	3	3	4	2	4	4	4	3	4	3	3	3	3	3	3	3	3	3	2	2	2	2	2
Rudeš	6	8	7	8	10	10	9	10	9	9	9	10	10	10	10	10	10	10	10	10	10	10	10	10	10	10	10	10	8	8	8	8	8	8	8	8
Slaven Belupo	10	5	4	3	5	5	5	5	5	5	5	7	7	7	7	7	7	7	7	7	7	6	6	6	5	6	6	6	7	7	7	7	7	7	7	7

Leader / Qualification to UEFA Champions League
Qualification to UEFA Europa League
Relegation play-off
Relegation to Druga HNL

== Relegation play-offs ==
At the end of the season, ninth placed team Istra 1961 will contest a two-legged relegation play-off tie against Varaždin, runners-up of the 2017–18 Croatian Second Football League.

=== First leg ===
30 May 2018
19:00 CEST

Istra 1961	3–1	Varaždin
Golubar 55' (o.g.); Vojnović 64'; Roce 88'		Drožđek 10'

Aldo Drosina
Attendance: 4,107
Referee: Fran Jović (Zagreb)

=== Second leg ===
2 June 2018
19:00 CEST

Varaždin	1–0	Istra 1961
Drožđek 55'

Stadion Varteks
Attendance: 8,153
Referee: Duje Strukan (Split)

Istra 1961 won 3–2 on aggregate.

== Statistics ==
=== Top scorers ===
As of 19 May 2018

Rank	Player	Club	Goals
1	(Algeria) El Arabi Hillel Soudani	Dinamo Zagreb	17
2	(Brazil) Héber	Rijeka	16
3	(Switzerland) Mario Gavranović	Rijeka (7), Dinamo Zagreb (8)	15
3	(North Macedonia) Mirko Ivanovski	Slaven Belupo	15
5	(Croatia) Mario Budimir	Rudeš (13), Dinamo Zagreb (1)	14
6	(Croatia) Jakov Puljić	Inter Zaprešić (4), Rijeka (8)	12
7	(Croatia) Lovro Majer	Lokomotiva	11
7	(Italy) Said Ahmed Said	Hajduk Split	11
9	(Croatia) Ante Erceg	Hajduk Split	9
9	(Bosnia and Herzegovina) Haris Hajradinović	Osijek	9
9	(Cameroon) Franck Ohandza	Hajduk Split	9

== Awards ==
=== Annual awards ===
Award	Winner	Club
Player of the Season	(Algeria) Hillal Soudani	Dinamo Zagreb
Manager of the Season	(Slovenia) Matjaž Kek	Rijeka
Young Player of the Season	(Croatia) Lovro Majer	Lokomotiva

Team of the Year
Goalkeeper	(Croatia) Dominik Livaković (Dinamo Zagreb)			
Defence	(Croatia) Josip Juranović (Hajduk Split)		(Croatia) Zoran Nižić (Hajduk Split)	(Croatia) Filip Benković (Dinamo Zagreb)
Midfield	(Algeria) Hillal Soudani (Dinamo Zagreb)	(North Macedonia) Arijan Ademi (Dinamo Zagreb)	(Croatia) Filip Bradarić (Rijeka)	(Croatia) Borna Sosa (Dinamo Zagreb)
Midfield	(Croatia) Lovro Majer (Lokomotiva)			
Attack	(Switzerland) Mario Gavranović (Dinamo Zagreb)		(Brazil) Héber (Rijeka)	

== Attendances ==
#	Club	Average	Change	Highest
1	Hajduk Split	11,999	43.9%	31,751
2	Rijeka	4,836	1.7%	7,134
3	Dinamo Zagreb	4,108	-8.3%	13,500
4	Osijek	3,214	3.1%	8,054
5	Cibalia	1,331	-23.4%	3,196
6	Istra	1,286	-25.0%	3,119
7	Slaven Belupo	971	-11.4%	2,403
8	Lokomotiva	701	8.9%	2,293
9	Inter Zaprešić	572	-32.8%	2,169
10	Rudeš	461	22.5%	2,102
