= Agić =

Agić is a surname. Notable people with the surname include:

- Đuka Agić (born 1985), Croatian footballer
- Hasiba Agić (fl. 1979), Bosnian folk singer
- Jasmin Agić (born 1974), Croatian footballer
- Mustafa Agić (born 1966), Bosnian footballer
- Sabahudin Agić (born 1969), Bosnian footballer
