= 1992 Croatian Football Cup =

Tournament details
- Country: Croatia
- Teams: 7

Final positions
- Champions: Inker Zaprešić (1st title)
- Runners-up: HAŠK Građanski

Tournament statistics
- Matches played: 12
- Goals scored: 30 (2.5 per match)
- Top goal scorer: Željko Adžić (4)

The 1992 Croatian Football Cup was the first season of Croatia's modern football knockout competition.

The Croatian clubs who were withdrawn from 1991–92 Yugoslav Cup took part in the competition.

== Brackets ==
Quarter-finals
Inker Zaprešić	2	1	3
Osijek	0	1	1
Rijeka	0	1	1
Hajduk Split	0	1	1
HAŠK Građanski	6	1	7
Rovinj	0	0	0

Semi-finals
Inker Zaprešić	5	2	7
Croatia Đakovo	0	1	1
Rijeka	2	1	3 (1)
HAŠK Građanski	1	2	3 (3)

Finals
Inker Zaprešić	1	1	2
HAŠK Građanski	1	0	1

== Quarter-finals ==
The quarter-final legs were held on 24 March and 21 April 1992. Croatia Đakovo were given a bye to the semi-finals.

Team 1	Agg.	Team 2	1st leg	2nd leg
Rijeka	1–1 (a)	Hajduk Split	0–0	1–1
HAŠK Građanski	7–0	Rovinj	6–0	1–0
Inker Zaprešić	3–1	Osijek	2–0	1–1

== Semi-finals ==
28 April 1992
17:30

Rijeka	2–1	HAŠK Građanski
Pavličić 30'; Vulić 40' (pen.)	Report	Adžić 26' (pen.)

Stadion Kantrida, Rijeka
Attendance: 5,000
Referee: Mateo Beusan (Dubrovnik)
19 May 1992
18:00

HAŠK Građanski	2–1	Rijeka
Adžić 7'; Vlaović 12'	Report	Vulić 65'
Penalties
Adžić (penalty scored); Panadić (penalty scored); Vlaović (penalty missed); Ladić (penalty scored)	3–1	(penalty missed) Grubor; (penalty missed) Vulić; (penalty missed) Šarić; (penalty scored) Škerjanc

Stadion Maksimir, Zagreb
Attendance: 15,000
Referee: Ivan Vranaričić (Đakovo)

3–3 on aggregate. HAŠK Građanski won 3–1 in penalty shootout.

28 April 1992
16:30

Inker Zaprešić	5–0	Croatia Đakovo
Miletić 8'; Čalo 26', 75'; Cvjetković 39'; Živković 39'	Report

Stadion Inkera, Zaprešić
Attendance: 2,000
Referee: Veselko Bebek (Rijeka)
19 May 1992
17:00

Croatia Đakovo	1–2	Inker Zaprešić
Mršić 15'	Report	Cvjetković 41'; Omrčen-Čeko 69'

Gradski stadion, Đakovo
Attendance: 1,200
Referee: Ivica Laptalo (Cavtat)

Inker Zaprešić won 7–1 on aggregate.

== Final ==
=== First leg ===
19 June 1992
17:30

Inker Zaprešić	1–1	HAŠK Građanski
Živković 78'	Report	Adžić 89'

Stadion Inkera, Zaprešić
Attendance: 12,000
Referee: Atif Lipovac (Zagreb)

=== Second leg ===
23 June 1992
20:15

HAŠK Građanski	0–1	Inker Zaprešić
	Report	Kasumović 18'

Stadion Maksimir, Zagreb
Attendance: 25,000
Referee: Ivan Vranaričić (Đakovo)

Inker Zaprešić won 2–1 on aggregate.

== See also ==
- 1992 Croatian First Football League
