= Darko Čordaš =

Croatian footballer (born 1976)

Personal information
- Date of birth: 16 December 1976 (age 49)
- Place of birth: Osijek, SFR Yugoslavia
- Height: 1.84 m (6 ft 1/2 in)
- Position: Midfielder

Senior career*
Years	Team	Apps	(Gls)
2001	Pohang Steelers	3	(0)
2002–2003	Posušje	0	(0)
2003	Osijek	14	(0)
2004	Grafičar Vodovod	10	(3)
2004	Međimurje	14	(1)
2005–2006	Neftchi Baku	21	(2)
2006	Chongqing Lifan	14	(4)
2006	Naftaš HAŠK	5	(2)
2007	Kamen Ingrad	14	(3)
2007	Vinogradar	14	(10)
2008	Trogir	23	(3)
2009	Vinogradar	26	(4)
2010	Shanghai Zobon	6	(0)
2010–2011	Hrvatski Dragovoljac	33	(0)
2012	Samobor	22	(2)

International career^{‡}
1994	Croatia U19	2	(0)
1996	Croatia U20	1	(0)
- * Club domestic league appearances and goals as of 21 October 2011 ‡ National team caps and goals as of 5 September 2011

Darko Čordaš (born 16 December 1976) is a Croatian retired football player, who last played for NK Samobor.

== Club career ==
Cordaš used to play for Pohang Steelers in South Korea, NK Posušje in Bosnia and Herzegovina, Neftchi Baku in Azerbaijan and NK Osijek, NK Grafičar Vodovod, NK Međimurje, NK Naftaš HAŠK, NK Kamen Ingrad, NK Vinogradar, HNK Trogir in Croatia.

He transferred to Shanghai Zobon in February 2010 and was released in July.

== Personal life ==
Darko's father, Stjepan Čordaš, is a football manager.
