= Milan Đuričić =

Milan Đuričić may refer to:

- Milan Đuričić (footballer, born 1945), Croatian football coach and former player
- Milan Đuričić (footballer, born 1961), Serbian football coach and former player
