= José Manuel Aira =

Spanish football manager (born 1976)

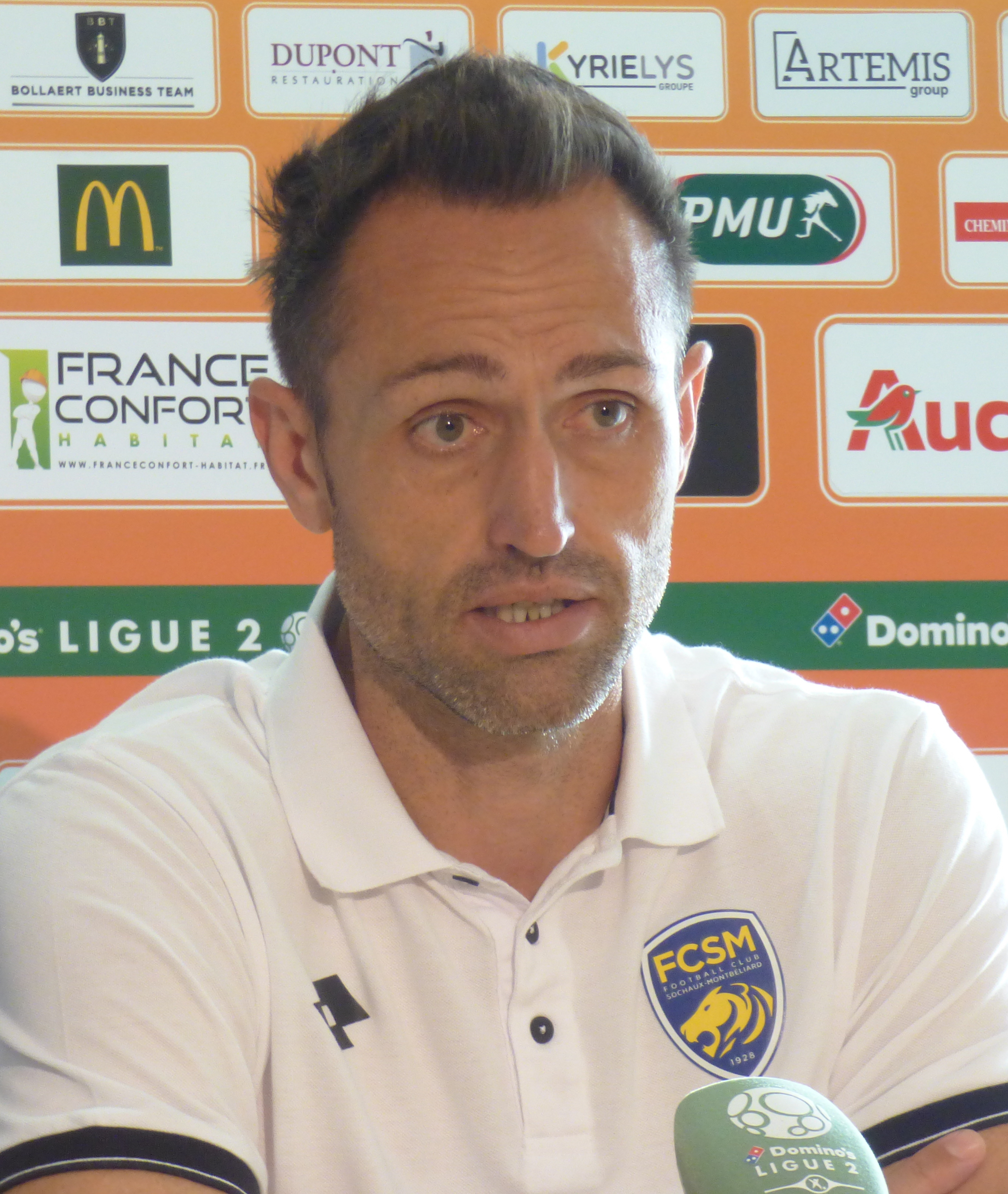
- Aira with Sochaux in 2018

Personal information
- Full name: José Manuel Aira Lindoso
- Date of birth: 14 March 1976 (age 50)
- Place of birth: Ponferrada, Spain
- Height: 1.87 m (6 ft 2 in)
- Position: Centre-back

Team information
- Current team: Penafiel (manager)

Youth career
- 1989–1991: Fuentesnuevas
- 1991–1995: Ponferradina

Senior career*
Years	Team	Apps	(Gls)
1995–1999	Deportivo B	147	(7)
1996–2002	Deportivo La Coruña	2	(0)
1999–2000	→ Tenerife (loan)	23	(0)
2000–2001	→ Racing Ferrol (loan)	41	(2)
2001–2002	→ Sporting Gijón (loan)	22	(1)
2002–2005	Poli Ejido	68	(4)
2005–2006	Racing Ferrol	28	(1)
2006–2010	Lugo	136	(6)
2010–2011	Racing Ferrol	36	(6)
Total		503	(27)

Managerial career
- 2011–2014: Racing Ferrol
- 2014–2016: Murcia
- 2016–2017: Albacete
- 2018: Rudeš
- 2018: Sochaux
- 2018–2020: Cultural Leonesa
- 2020–2021: Marbella
- 2022: UCAM Murcia
- 2022–2024: Alavés B
- 2025–: Penafiel
- * Club domestic league appearances and goals

José Manuel Aira Lindoso (born 14 March 1976) is a Spanish former professional footballer who played as a centre-back. He is currently manager of Liga Portugal 2 club Penafiel.

Having made two La Liga appearances for Deportivo de La Coruña, he spent most of his playing career in the Segunda División, playing 182 games for five teams, mainly Racing de Ferrol and Poli Ejido.

Aira's managerial career was mainly spent at the lower levels, apart from seven games with Albacete after winning promotion from Segunda División B in 2017, and brief spells with Rudeš of Croatia and Sochaux in France the following year.

== Playing career ==
Born in Ponferrada, Castile and León, Aira arrived at Deportivo de La Coruña from local SD Ponferradina aged 19, but never broke into the first-team setup during his spell, only appearing twice in La Liga. With more individual success, he spent the next seven seasons in the Segunda División, with CD Tenerife, Racing de Ferrol (twice), Sporting de Gijón and Polideportivo Ejido.

Aira returned to Galicia in the summer of 2006, moving to CD Lugo which had just returned to Segunda División B after a three-year absence. He continued to be a defensive mainstay until returning to Ferrol, now in the Tercera División.

== Coaching career ==
Aira retired in 2011, being immediately named manager of his last club Racing. He was subsequently in charge of Real Murcia CF and Albacete Balompié, leading the latter in their promotion to the second tier in 2017. He was dismissed on 2 October that year, with the team second from bottom.

On 13 March 2018, Aira moved abroad for the first time to NK Rudeš of Croatia, who had also had compatriot Iñaki Alonso in charge at the start of the season. His time there was brief, as by 23 May he was in charge of FC Sochaux-Montbéliard of France's Ligue 2. Having won one of nine games with the side in 18th on 25 November, he was sacked.

Aira took over at Cultural y Deportiva Leonesa on 18 December 2018 until the end of the third-division campaign, with an extra year in the case of promotion. They eventually missed the playoffs and his contract expired, though a deal on the same terms was agreed the following 20 June.

On 3 August 2020, Aira signed a one-year deal to manage Marbella FC also in division three. He was relieved of his duties the following 23 March, having failed in his goal of bringing the team to promotion, instead landing them in the new Segunda División RFEF.

Aira was hired by UCAM Murcia CF on 21 March 2022, replacing Salva Ballesta at a side facing relegation from the Primera División RFEF. Having won once in the remaining 11 fixtures, his services were not retained and he moved on to Deportivo Alavés B in June.

On 10 November 2024, after 11 games without a win to kickstart the fourth-tier campaign, Aira was fired. He went abroad again in September 2025, being appointed at Liga Portugal 2 club F.C. Penafiel.

== Personal life ==
Aira's younger brother Carlos was also a footballer and manager. Having also played for Deportivo B, he spent most of his career at amateur level.

== Managerial statistics ==
As of 7 November 2026

Managerial record by team and tenure
Team	Nat	From	To	Record								Ref
Team	Nat	From	To	G	W	D	L	GF	GA	GD	Win %	Ref
Racing Ferrol	(Spain)	14 October 2011	10 July 2014	111	62	26	23	205	96	+109	55.86	
Murcia	(Spain)	10 July 2014	8 May 2016	79	42	15	22	103	60	+43	53.16	
Albacete	(Spain)	9 June 2016	1 October 2017	55	25	14	16	80	59	+21	45.45	
Rudeš	(Croatia)	12 March 2018	22 May 2018	12	7	3	2	19	13	+6	58.33	
Sochaux	(France)	22 May 2018	25 November 2018	17	5	3	9	17	25	−8	29.41	
Cultural Leonesa	(Spain)	18 December 2018	31 July 2020	55	27	18	10	90	51	+39	49.09	
Marbella	(Spain)	3 August 2020	23 March 2021	20	5	6	9	23	22	+1	25.00	
UCAM Murcia	(Spain)	21 March 2022	10 June 2022	11	1	4	6	8	18	−10	9.09	
Alavés B	(Spain)	16 June 2022	10 November 2024	83	33	23	27	109	82	+27	39.76	
Penafiel	(Portugal)	25 September 2025	Present	41	19	7	15	58	44	+14	46.34	
Career total				484	226	119	139	712	470	+242	46.69	—

== Honours ==
=== Manager ===
Racing Ferrol

- Tercera División: 2012–13
