= Zoran Živković =

Zoran Živković may refer to:

- Zoran Živković (handballer) (born 1945), Serbian handball player and coach widely known under his nickname Tuta
- Zoran Živković (writer) (born 1948), Serbian writer
- Zoran Živković (politician) (born 1960), politician and former Prime Minister of Serbia
- Zoran Živković (footballer) (born 1967), Croatian international footballer
