= Ivo Ergović =

Croatian footballer

Personal information
- Full name: Ivo Ergović
- Date of birth: 24 December 1967 (age 58)
- Place of birth: Osijek, SR Croatia, SFR Yugoslavia
- Height: 1.88 m (6 ft 2 in)
- Position: Defensive midfielder

Senior career*
Years	Team	Apps	(Gls)
1984–1985	FEŠK Feričanci		
1985–1986	NK Đurđenovac		
1986–1990	Belišće		
1990–1991	Osijek		
1992–1993	Austria Salzburg	33	(3)
1993–1994	Belišće	27	(2)
1994–2002	Osijek	193	(10)

International career
1997	Croatia	1	(0)
- * Club domestic league appearances and goals

Ivo Ergović (born 24 December 1967) is a Croatian retired footballer who played as a defensive midfielder and made one appearance for the Croatia national team.

== International career ==
Ergović earned his first and only cap for Croatia on 8 June 1997 in the Kirin Cup against Japan. He came on as a half-time substitute for Dubravko Pavličić in the away match, which was played in Tokyo and finished as a 3–4 loss.

== Career statistics ==
=== International ===
Croatia
Year	Apps	Goals
1997	1	0
Total	1	0
