= Ivica Kulešević =

Croatian footballer and manager

Personal information
- Date of birth: 31 October 1969 (age 56)
- Place of birth: Osijek, SFR Yugoslavia
- Position: Defender

Team information
- Current team: Osijek (sporting director)

Senior career*
Years	Team	Apps	(Gls)
1987–1996	Osijek	83	(1)
1988–1989	→ Dinamo Vinkovci (loan)	3	(0)
1996–1998	Hrvatski Dragovoljac	36	(0)
1998	Samobor	9	(0)
1998–1999	Hapoel Petah Tikva	25	(0)
2000–2001	Šibenik	8	(0)
2001	Osijek	8	(0)

Managerial career
- 2013–2014: Osijek
- 2014–2015: Rijeka II
- 2019: Osijek (caretaker)
- 2019–2020: Osijek
- 2022–2023: Osijek
- * Club domestic league appearances and goals

Ivica Kulešević (born 31 October 1969) is a Croatian football manager and former player who is current the sporting director of Croatian Football League club NK Osijek.

== Managerial career ==
=== Osijek ===
On 17 October 2019, after he firstly worked as caretaker manager, Kulešević was appointed the head coach of Croatian First Football League club NK Osijek.

On 4 September 2020, Kulešević and Osijek parted ways.
