= Milan Đuričić (footballer, born 1945) =

Croatian footballer and coach

Personal information
- Full name: Milan Đuričić
- Date of birth: 3 May 1945 (age 81)
- Place of birth: Osijek, Yugoslavia
- Position: Winger

Senior career*
Years	Team	Apps	(Gls)
1960–1964	LIO Osijek		
1964–1965	Metalac Osijek		
1965–1969	Osijek		
1969–1970	Mura		
1970–1975	Maribor	95	(4)

Managerial career
- 1979–1980: Osijek
- 1983–1985: Osijek
- 1985–1986: Proleter Zrenjanin
- 1987: Osijek
- 1989–1991: Beauvais
- 1991–1993: DSV Leoben
- 1993–1994: Sturm Graz
- 1994–1995: Vorwärts Steyr
- 1995–1996: DSV Leoben
- 1997–1999: Osijek
- 1999–2002: DSV Leoben
- 2002: Osijek
- 2005–2006: Maribor
- 2006: ASKÖ Pasching
- 2008: Drava Ptuj
- 2008: Dunajská Streda
- 2009: Croatia Sesvete
- 2009–2010: Celje
- 2010–2011: Croatia Sesvete
- 2011–2012: Rudar Velenje
- 2019: Krško
- * Club domestic league appearances and goals

Milan Đuričić (pronounced [mǐlan dʑǔritʃitɕ]; born 3 August 1945) is a Croatian retired footballer and coach.

He managed hometown club NK Osijek 5 times, succeeding Miljenko Mihić in 1979 for his first stint.
