= NK Maksimir =

Croatian football club

- Full name: Nogometni klub Maksimir
- Founded: 27 April 1924
- Ground: Stadion Oboj
- Capacity: 247 seats
- Chairman: Željko Pakasin
- Manager: Davor Matić
- League: 3. NL Center
- 2022–23: 3. NL Center, 2nd of 18
Home colours	Away colours

NK Maksimir is a Croatian football club founded in 1924 and based in the Maksimir district of Zagreb. They currently play in 3. NL, the fourth level league of the Croatian football league system.

== Stadion Oboj ==
Oboj
- Full name: Stadion Oboj
- Location: Zagreb, Croatia
- Operator: NK Maksimir
- Capacity: 247
- Surface: Grass
- Field size: 102 m × 64 m (335 ft × 210 ft)

Tenant
- NK Maksimir (1956–present)

Stadion Oboj is a small football stadium in Zagreb, Croatia. It is located on the corner of Oboj and Prilesje streets in the Maksimir district and serves as home of NK Maksimir football club. Pitch dimensions are 102 x 64 metres and it has a capacity of 247 seats.

NK Maksimir didn't have their own ground before World War II, and they used various grounds around the city, such as HAŠK's training ground at Bukovačka street. All of Maksimir's competitive matches in the period from 1924 to 1940 were hosted at one of the only four grounds in Zagreb at the time: Koturaška Road (owned by Građanski), Maksimir Stadium (owned by HAŠK), Tratinska Road (owned by Concordia) and Miramarska Road (used by Viktorija and Željezničar football clubs).

In the early 1950s NK Maksimir mainly used the ground adjacent to Maksimir Stadium (which is today Dinamo Zagreb's training ground called Hitrec-Kacian), before permanently settling at Oboj in 1956.
