= Stjepan Čordaš =

Croatian footballer (born 1951)

Personal information
- Date of birth: 18 November 1951 (age 74)

Senior career*
Years	Team	Apps	(Gls)
1969–1982	Osijek		

Managerial career
- 1992: Osijek
- 2004–2005: Osijek
- 2006: Chongqing Lifan
- 2007: Kamen Ingrad
- 2007: Hrvatski Dragovoljac
- 2007–2008: Sesvete
- 2008: Međimurje
- 2009: Samobor
- 2009–2011: Samobor (sports coordinator)
- 2011: Hrvatski Dragovoljac
- 2012: Samobor
- 2015: Segesta
- 2016-2017: Vrapče
- * Club domestic league appearances and goals

Stjepan Čordaš (born 18 November 1951) is a Croatian football manager and former player.

== Playing career ==
Čordaš is the record holder for the number of competitive years he spent with Osijek, playing 13 seasons with the club and captaining them to the Yugoslav First League in 1977. He played as a forward.

== Managerial career ==
In 2007, he took charge of Sesvete, replacing Borimir Perković. In October 2015 he became boss at Segesta.

Čordaš was named manager of NK Vrapče in September 2016, succeeding Krešimir Sunar in the job.

== Personal life ==
He is the father of Darko Čordaš.
