= Ivan Meštrović (sportsman) =

Croatian entrepreneur, sportsman and artist (born 1979)

- Born: 21 January 1979 (age 47); Osijek, SR Croatia, SFR Yugoslavia (now Croatia)
- Education: University of Zagreb
- Occupations: Entrepreneur; sportsperson
- Known for: Co-owner of NK Osijek

Ivan Meštrović (Croatian pronunciation: [ǐʋan mɛ̂ʃtrɔʋit͡ɕ]; born 21 January 1979) is a Croatian entrepreneur and sportsman who has been the co-owner of Croatian football club NK Osijek.

== Biography ==
Meštrović was born in Osijek, which he left in 1997 for Zagreb. In 2008 he went to Dubai where he managed his business activities in eight central and eastern countries.

Meštrović is fluent in three languages and has developed business with more continents. In 2016 he started with association football. He also was the owner of one of Italian football clubs, being become the first Croat to own the one Italian club.

Meštrović is one of the famous Croatian entrepreneurs. He is currently the co-owner of Croatian football club NK Osijek, and has also served as the club's chairman.

He is a grandson of Croatian politician Adam Meštrović, one of founders of HDZ party.
