= Hasiba Agić =

Bosnian musician

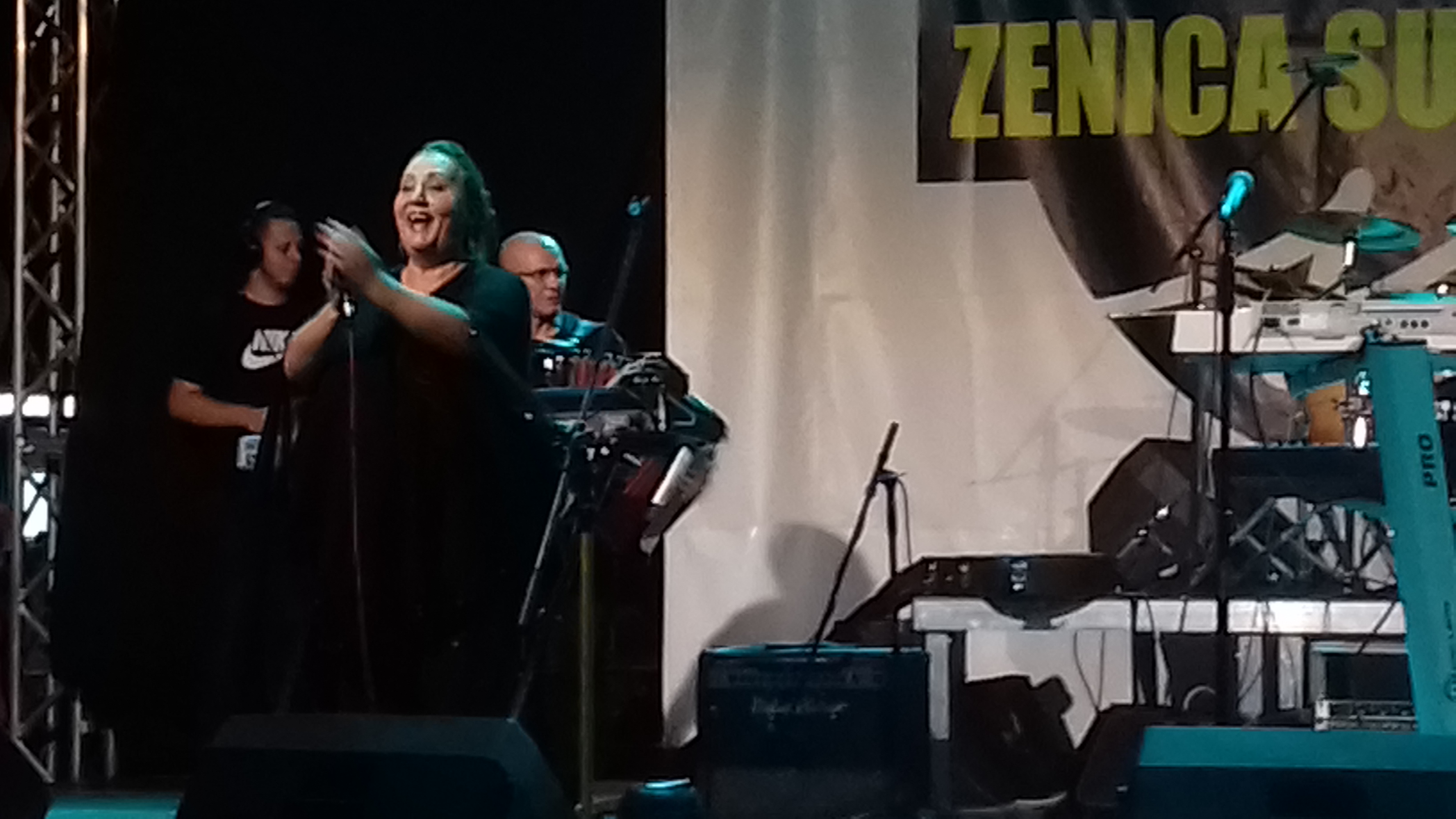
- Agić performing in 2019
- Born: Zenica, SR Bosnia and Herzegovina, SFR Yugoslavia
- Musical career
- Genres: Sevdalinka, Bosnian folk
- Instrument: Vocals
- Years active: 1979–present
- Labels: Diskoton; HALIX; Sarajevo disk; Hayat production

Hasiba Agić (Serbo-Croatian Cyrillic: Хасиба Агић) is a Bosnian sevdalinka-folk singer and interpreter.

== Career ==
Her most famous works are "Došli dani tugom rasplakani", "Plastim suhu travu", "Uvijek si mi govorila majko moja stara", "Sarajevo, Behara ti tvoga", "Nije Bosna čaša vode", "Harmoniko moja" (film Grbavica), "Moj dragane što me zaboravljaš", "Plakat' ću samo ja", "Oj jeseni tugo moja", "Alipaša na Hercegovini", etc. She gave a number of humanitarian concerts in BiH and Balkans; she appeared on Zenica summer fest 2019's 15th-night show, entitled "Svjetski a naši" (English: Mondial But Ours). During the Bosnian War she sung on first lines, and was in Army of Republic of Bosnia and Herzegovina (101st Brigade). She is part of OTV Valentino team.

== Personal life ==
Agić is married and has two daughters.

She testified on Bosnian Court about importing things from Germany into Bosnia for brothers Dacić who traded drugs.

== Discography ==
Albums

- Hasiba Agić Uz Ansambl Budimira-Buce Jovanovića – Hasiba Agić (1984, Diskoton)
- Plače Mi Se Od Života (1988, HALIX)
- Uspomene (2017, Hayat production)
- Pisma Razdvojenih (?, Terra)
- Hasiba Agić (?, /)

Singles

- "Ti Odlaziš Za Uvijek Od Mene" / "Nemaš Sreće Da Me Ljubiš" (1979, Diskoton)
- "Koga Nema Bez Njega Se Može" / "Nesretno Je Srce Moje" (1979, Diskoton)
- "Za Ljubav Je Kasno" / "Gdje Si Poš'o Mensure" (1981, Sarajevo Disk)

== See also ==
- Beba Selimović
- List of Bosnia and Herzegovina patriotic songs
