= Davor Matić =

Croatian footballer and manager (born 1959)

Personal information
- Full name: Davor Matić
- Date of birth: 28 October 1959 (age 67)
- Place of birth: Drniš, SR Croatia, Yugoslavia
- Position: Defender

Senior career*
Years	Team	Apps	(Gls)
?–1986	Šibenik		
1986–1990	Dinamo Zagreb	65	(7)

Managerial career
- 2013-2014: Maksimir
- 2015-2016: Jarun
- 2016-2017: Dubrava
- 2017-2018: Nur Zagreb
- 2018: Dubrava
- 2018-2019: Samobor
- 2020-2021: Devetka
- 2021: ATSV Stadl-Paura
- * Club domestic league appearances and goals

Davor Matić (born 28 October 1959) is a Croatian association football manager and former player. He played as a central defender. He retired in 1990.

== Managerial career ==
Matić was appointed manager of Dubrava, but resigned in October 2016 He later replaced Siniša Mioković as manager of Samobor and he managed Austrian third-tier outfit ATSV Stadl-Paura for a few games in 2021.
