= Jozo Bogdanović =

Yugoslav footballer

Personal information
- Full name: Jozo Bogdanović
- Date of birth: 21 October 1960 (age 66)
- Place of birth: Dubrovnik, SFR Yugoslavia
- Position: Forward

Team information
- Current team: NK Lokomotiva (U-19 manager)

Senior career*
Years	Team	Apps	(Gls)
1978–1985	RNK Split		
1986–1988	Dinamo Zagreb	46	(16)
1988–1989	Austria Klagenfurt	19	(9)
1990–1991	HNK Rijeka	8	(0)
1992–1995	Inker Zaprešić	52	(10)

Managerial career
- 2017–: NK Lokomotiva (U-19)
- * Club domestic league appearances and goals

Jozo Bogdanović (born 21 October 1960) is a Croatian football coach and a former forward who played for several Croatian and foreign football clubs. He is the manager of the Under-19 squad of NK Lokomotiva.

== Career ==
Jozo Bogdanović began his career playing for RNK Split which competed in the second and third level of Yugoslav league system. At the beginning of 1986 he moved to Dinamo Zagreb for whom he played 49 official matches and scored 16 goals in two and a half seasons and then he moved abroad. He finished his career playing for NK Inter Zapresic. Although he is deaf, he assimilated well in every team he played for.

== Honours ==
RNK Split

- Croatian Republic Football League – South: 1983–84

Inker Zaprešić

- Croatian Cup: 1992
