= Davor Rupnik =

Croatian footballer (born 1971)

Personal information
- Date of birth: 29 August 1971 (age 55)
- Place of birth: Osijek, Croatia
- Position: Midfielder

Team information
- Current team: Belišće (manager)

Youth career
- Osijek

Senior career*
Years	Team	Apps	(Gls)
1990–1998	Osijek	143+	(9+)
1998–2000	Hapoel Tel Aviv	54	(1)
2000–2001	Bnei Yehuda	33	(1)
2001–2002	Metalac Osijek		
2002	Šmartno	3	(0)

Managerial career
- 2011–2013: BSK Bijelo Brdo
- 2013: Osijek
- 2014–2018: BSK Bijelo Brdo
- 2018: Cibalia
- 2019-2022: Belišće
- * Club domestic league appearances and goals

Davor Rupnik (born 29 August 1971) is a Croatian football manager and former player, who most recently managed Belišće.
