= Darko Vujović =

Montenegrin footballer

Personal information
- Full name: Darko Vujović
- Date of birth: 21 December 1962 (age 63)
- Place of birth: Nikšić, SFR Yugoslavia
- Position: Defender

Senior career*
| Years | Team | Apps | (Gls) |
| 1980–1982 | Sutjeska Nikšić | 3 | (0) |
| 1982–1986 | Novi Pazar | 58 | (4) |
| 1986–1988 | Dinamo Zagreb | 34 | (1) |
| 1988–1990 | Dinamo Vinkovci | 65 | (6) |
| 1990–1992 | Vojvodina | 30 | (1) |
| 1993 | Bečej | 12 | (2) |
| 1994 | Spartak Subotica | 14 | (0) |
| Total | | 216 | (13) |
- * Club domestic league appearances and goals

Darko Vujović (Serbian Cyrillic: Дарко Вујовић; born 21 December 1962) is a Montenegrin retired footballer. He played for Sutjeska Nikšić, FK Novi Pazar, Dinamo Zagreb, Dinamo Vinkovci and Vojvodina Novi Sad in the Yugoslav First League.
