= Zoran Živković (footballer) =

Croatian footballer

Personal information
- Full name: Zoran Živković
- Date of birth: 12 September 1967 (age 59)
- Place of birth: SR Croatia, SFR Yugoslavia
- Position: Defender

Senior career*
Years	Team	Apps	(Gls)
1991–1993	Inker Zaprešić	19	(3)
1993	Croatia Zagreb	7	(0)
1993–1995	Segesta	40	(0)
1996	Marsonia	10	(0)
1996–1998	Šibenik	19	(1)

International career
1993	Croatia	1	(0)
- * Club domestic league appearances and goals

Zoran Živković (born 12 September 1967) is a Croatian former footballer who played as a defender and made one appearance for the Croatia national team.

== Career ==
Živković earned his first and only cap for Croatia on 25 June 1993 in a friendly against Ukraine. He started in the home fixture, which was played in Zagreb, but was substituted out at half-time for Josip Gašpar. The match finished as a 3–1 win for Croatia.

== Career statistics ==
=== International ===
Croatia
Year	Apps	Goals
1993	1	0
Total	1	0
