= NK Inter Zaprešić =

Association football club in Croatia

Inter Zaprešić
- Full name: Nogometni klub Inter Zaprešić
- Nicknames: Keramičari (The Ceramists), Div iz predgrađa (The Giant from the Suburb)
- Short name: INT
- Founded: 25 June 1929; 96 years ago (as NK Sava)
- Dissolved: 21 July 2022
- Ground: Stadion ŠRC Zaprešić
- Capacity: 5,228
- President: Branko Laljak
| Home colours | Away colours |

Nogometni klub Inter Zaprešić was a Croatian professional football club based in Zaprešić, a town northwest of the capital Zagreb.

The team were nicknamed Keramičari (The ceramics makers), because they were sponsored by a ceramics factory through much of their history) or Div iz predgrađa (The giant from the suburb). The team's colours are yellow and blue. Home games at Ivan Laljak-Ivić Stadium. On 20 July 2022, Inter has dissolved due to financial issues.

== History ==
=== Early years and "Jugokeramika" ===
The club was originally established in 1929 as NK Sava. In 1932 the name was changed to NK Jelačić. After the end of WW2 the club was renamed NK Zaprešić. The club kept that name until 1962, when they were renamed Jugokeramika, after their main sponsor, a local ceramics factory. That same year the club's ground, ŠRC Zaprešić, was built and opened. The club's first notable success came in the 1980s under the tenure of manager Zorislav Srebrić (1985–1990). Up until then the club had spent their entire existence in lower-level leagues, but in 1987 they managed to reach the finals of the qualifying playoff for promotion to the Yugoslav Second League (which they lost against fellow Croatian side Šparta from Beli Manastir). In 1987 the east stand of the ground was built, and Jugokeramika's home served as one of the venues for the 1987 Summer Universiade football tournament.

=== "Inker" era ===
Following Croatia's independence in 1991, Jugokeramika (the factory) changed its name to "Inker" (an acronym for Industrija keramike, Eng: Ceramics Industry) and the club followed suit, adopting the name NK Inker Zaprešić. The club participated in the inaugural season of the newly established Croatian championship and finished fourth, but more memorable was their 1992 Croatian Cup win. The team was managed by Ilija Lončarević and notable players of the cup-winning squad included Croatian internationals Ivan Cvjetković, Krunoslav Jurčić and Zvonimir Soldo. Although this meant that Inker had qualified for the Cup Winners' Cup, Croatian clubs couldn't participate in European competitions due to the ongoing war, so Inker missed out on their first ever chance to participate in continental competitions. However, the club holds the distinction of playing the first ever international club match hosted by a Croatian club since Croatian independence, a friendly against Sturm Graz played in February 1992, and they were also the first Croatian side to play abroad, when they played a friendly against Brighton & Hove Albion in England in the summer of 1991. In the following years the club's performances rapidly declined and in 1997 they were relegated to 2. HNL, and in 1999 further down to 3. HNL. The year 2000 proved to be a turning point, and in 2001 they bounced back to second level and in 2003 club got promoted back to top level by winning its first Druga HNL title.

=== League success ===
In 2003 their main sponsor, the ceramics factory Inker, ceased sponsoring the club, so the club was renamed once again, to Inter Zaprešić. In the 2004–05 season they finished runners-up in the league, which is still their record-high finish. The following season Inter finally debuted in European competitions, but were knocked out in their first tie by Serbian side Red Star 7–1 on aggregate in the second qualifying round of the 2005–06 UEFA Cup, with Srđan Pecelj scoring Inter's only European goal to date. Inter's success between 2002 and 2005 was largely helped by players who were loaned from Croatian powerhouse Dinamo Zagreb (such as Luka Modrić, Vedran Ćorluka and Eduardo), so Inter's fortunes changed again once again after they were recalled to Dinamo. They slipped down to second level in 2006, but managed to win promotion immediately in the 2006–07 season when club won its second Druga HNL title. The following years were a struggle and the main goal was to preserve Prva HNL status except in 2010–11 when the club surprisingly finished 5th overall. In 2013, they slipped down, for the third time in their history, to Druga HNL.

=== Recent years ===
In 2014, club hired Samir Toplak. Primary goal was to secure promotion, which Toplak accomplished by winning club's third Druga HNL title and got promoted to Prva HNL. Following season, club exceeded expectations by finishing 5th. Successful campaign was led by Ilija Nestorovski, who scored 25 league goals making him the league's top scorer. In 2019, in the eve of COVID-19 pandemic, club started restructuring to a sports stock company. New ownership structure sacked Toplak after five and a half years in charge, longest serving Prva HNL coach to this date, and appointed Željko Petrović. As pandemic reached Croatia, restructuring was never completed. Pandemic, ownership turmoil and managerial changes took effect on team performance which finished last in 2019–20 Prva HNL campaign, ending a five-year top flight spell.

=== Name changes ===
- NK Sava (1929–1932)
- HŠK Jelačić (1932–1945)
- NK Zaprešić (1945–1962)
- NK Jugokeramika (1962–1991)
- NK Inker Zaprešić (1991–2003)
- NK Inter Zaprešić (2003–2022)

== Supporters ==
Because of Zaprešić's geographic proximity to Zagreb, the hometown of GNK Dinamo Zagreb, Inter Zaprešić always struggled to attract people to games. Nevertheless, throughout the years, a group of fans managed to organise themselves into the supporters group called Divlje Svinje (Wild Pigs).

=== History ===
In the 1990s, some members of Bad Blue Boys who wanted a new challenge came together and cheered using the flares during the game of Inter Zaprešić. Few days later, the picture of them was released in daily newspapers and the event is known as the day when Wild Pigs were formed. More and more people were joining the group on a game to game basis. In 1991, Wild Pigs were formally registered as a citizen association in Zaprešić.

At the end of the 1996–97 season, Inter Zaprešić was relegated to a lower level and members of Wild Pigs started to give up with organised support and those who left did not have enough patience and will to go on. As more and more members were leaving the group, eventually it has fallen apart.

At the end of the 2002–03 season, Inter Zaprešić came back to the top tier of Croatian football after playing 6 years in lower divisions. That was the spark needed for forming Wild Pigs once again. During 2004–05, Inter Zaprešić was a contender for the national championship which was the huge boost to fanbase and membership of the group. Several records were broken that year for the club, especially in attendance category.

Just a year after, at the end of 2005–06 season, Inter Zaprešić was relegated once again to lower division. The existence of the group was in question, just like in 1997. But this time, the group did not fall apart.

=== Reviving the group ===
In 2012–13, the group was revived by younger fans who organised cheering during the first home game in the second part of season. Eventually, club had support in every home and away game. At the end of the season, Inter Zaprešić was relegated to a lower division, but Wild Pigs continued with their effort to support the team.

== Honours ==
- Croatian First League
  - Runners-up (1): 2004–05
- Croatian Second League
  - Winners (3): 2002–03, 2006–07, 2014–15
- Croatian Cup
  - Winners (1): 1992
- Croatian Super Cup
  - Runners-up (1): 1992

== Recent seasons ==
| Season | League | | | | | | | | | Cup | European competitions | | Top goalscorer | |
| Season | Division | P | W | D | L | F | A | Pts | Pos | Cup | European competitions | | Player | Goals |
|---|---|---|---|---|---|---|---|---|---|---|---|---|---|---|
| 1992 | 1. HNL | 22 | 10 | 6 | 6 | 37 | 19 | 26 | 4th | W | | | Igor Čalo | 7 |
| 1992–93 | 1. HNL | 30 | 9 | 9 | 12 | 35 | 31 | 27 | 9th | SF | | | Ivan Cvjetković | 6 |
| 1993–94 | 1. HNL | 34 | 17 | 8 | 9 | 48 | 34 | 42 | 4th | R2 | | | Renato Jurčec | 11 |
| 1994–95 | 1. HNL | 30 | 11 | 6 | 13 | 41 | 41 | 39 | 7th | R2 | | | Renato Jurčec | 12 |
| 1995–96 | 1. HNL | 36 | 9 | 11 | 16 | 36 | 53 | 43(5) | 13th | QF | | | Tomislav Žitković | 8 |
| 1996–97 | 1. HNL | 30 | 6 | 3 | 21 | 22 | 65 | 21 | 16th ↓ | QF | | | Siniša Odorjan | 8 |
| 1997–98 | 2. HNL | 32 | 21 | 4 | 7 | 62 | 29 | 67 | 4th | R1 | | | | |
| 1998–99 | 2. HNL | 36 | 3 | 5 | 28 | 25 | 103 | 14 | 19th ↓ | R1 | | | | |
| 1999–00 | 3. HNL | 28 | 11 | 4 | 13 | 50 | 47 | 37 | 6th | R1 | | | | |
| 2000–01 | 3. HNL | 30 | 22 | 0 | 8 | 88 | 43 | 66 | 2nd ↑ | QF | | | | |
| 2001–02 | 2. HNL | 30 | 11 | 8 | 11 | 46 | 40 | 41 | 8th | R2 | | | | |
| 2002–03 | 2. HNL | 32 | 23 | 3 | 6 | 79 | 30 | 72 | 1st ↑ | R2 | | | | |
| 2003–04 | 1. HNL | 32 | 11 | 9 | 12 | 40 | 38 | 42 | 8th | R1 | | | Ivica Karabogdan | 10 |
| 2004–05 | 1. HNL | 32 | 15 | 9 | 8 | 44 | 39 | 54 | 2nd | R1 | | | Bernard Gulić; Davor Piškor; Zoran Zekić | 5 |
| 2005–06 | 1. HNL | 32 | 8 | 7 | 17 | 30 | 53 | 31 | 12th ↓ | R2 | UEFA Cup | QR2 | Tomislav Gondžić | 6 |
| 2006–07 | 2. HNL | 30 | 21 | 5 | 4 | 60 | 28 | 68 | 1st ↑ | QF | | | Bernard Gulić | 19 |
| 2007–08 | 1. HNL | 33 | 8 | 9 | 16 | 27 | 59 | 33 | 11th | QF | | | Davor Kukec | 6 |
| 2008–09 | 1. HNL | 33 | 9 | 9 | 15 | 41 | 50 | 36 | 9th | R2 | | | Ilija Sivonjić | 8 |
| 2009–10 | 1. HNL | 30 | 10 | 3 | 17 | 36 | 50 | 33 | 13th | R2 | | | Mario Grgurović; Miroslav Šarić | 5 |
| 2010–11 | 1. HNL | 30 | 12 | 6 | 12 | 31 | 35 | 42 | 5th | R2 | | | Aleksandar Trajkovski | 4 |
| 2011–12 | 1. HNL | 30 | 11 | 5 | 14 | 33 | 33 | 38 | 11th | R2 | | | Ante Budimir; Tomislav Šarić | 6 |
| 2012–13 | 1. HNL | 33 | 8 | 11 | 14 | 36 | 41 | 35 | 10th ↓ | R1 | | | Mislav Oršić | 12 |
| 2013–14 | 2. HNL | 33 | 16 | 5 | 12 | 47 | 32 | 53 | 3rd | QF | | | Ilija Nestorovski | 22 |
| 2014–15 | 2. HNL | 30 | 17 | 7 | 6 | 48 | 25 | 58 | 1st ↑ | R1 | | | Ilija Nestorovski | 23 |
| 2015–16 | 1. HNL | 36 | 11 | 14 | 11 | 39 | 48 | 47 | 5th | QF | | | Ilija Nestorovski | 25 |
| 2016–17 | 1. HNL | 36 | 5 | 13 | 18 | 26 | 57 | 28 | 8th | QF | | | Jakov Puljić | 11 |
| 2017–18 | 1. HNL | 36 | 11 | 10 | 15 | 44 | 63 | 43 | 7th | QF | | | Komnen Andrić; Vlatko Blažević | 8 |
| 2018–19 | 1. HNL | 36 | 9 | 4 | 23 | 40 | 84 | 31 | 8th | SF | | | Komnen Andrić | 10 |
| 2019–20 | 1. HNL | 36 | 3 | 8 | 25 | 32 | 72 | 17 | 10th ↓ | QF | | | Serder Serderov | 9 |
| 2020–21 | 2. HNL | 34 | 12 | 9 | 13 | 49 | 41 | 45 | 10th | R1 | | | Martín Šroler | 9 |
| 2021–22 | 2. HNL | 34 | 13 | 9 | 8 | 34 | 29 | 48 | 3rd | R1 | | | Dominik Rešetar | 9 |

Key
League: P = Matches played; W = Matches won; D = Matches drawn; L = Matches lost; F = Goals for; A = Goals against; Pts = Points won; Pos = Final position;
Cup / Europe: PR = Preliminary round; QR = Qualifying round; R1 = First round; R2 = Second round; Group = Group stage; QF = Quarter-final; SF = Semi-final; RU = Runner-up; W = Competition won;

== European record ==
=== Summary ===
| Competition | Pld | W | D | L | GF | GA | Last season played |
|---|---|---|---|---|---|---|---|
| UEFA Cup | 2 | 0 | 0 | 2 | 1 | 7 | 2005–06 |
| Total | 2 | 0 | 0 | 2 | 1 | 7 | |

Source: uefa.com, Last updated on 10 September 2010
Pld = Matches played; W = Matches won; D = Matches drawn; L = Matches lost; GF = Goals for; GA = Goals against. Defunct competitions indicated in italics.

=== By season ===
| Season | Competition | Round | Opponent | Home | Away | Agg. |
|---|---|---|---|---|---|---|
| 2005–06 | UEFA Cup | QR2 | (Serbia and Montenegro) Red Star Belgrade | 1–3 | 0–4 | 1–7 |

=== Player records ===
- Top scorers in UEFA club competitions: 1 goal
  - Srđan Pecelj

== Current squad ==
As of 13 April 2022

Note: Flags indicate national team as defined under FIFA eligibility rules; some limited exceptions apply. Players may hold more than one non-FIFA nationality.

| No. | Pos. | Nation | Player |
|---|---|---|---|
| 1 | GK | CRO | Luka Ivan Lukic |
| 3 | MF | CRO | Branimir Barišić |
| 4 | DF | CRO | Luka Jelenic |
| 5 | FW | KSA | Abdullah Mahbub |
| 6 | DF | CRO | Ivan Nekić |
| 8 | MF | CRO | Ivan Jajalo |
| 9 | FW | CRO | Matija Kanceljak |
| 10 | MF | CRO | Nikola Rak |
| 11 | MF | CRO | Lovro Banovec |
| 12 | GK | CRO | Ivan Križanović |
| 13 | DF | CRO | Nino Vukasović (on loan from Dinamo Zagreb) |
| 15 | DF | CRO | Luka Dumančić |
| 16 | MF | CRO | Damir Magdić |

| No. | Pos. | Nation | Player |
|---|---|---|---|
| 17 | FW | CRO | Mateo Plehan |
| 20 | DF | CRO | Luka Uzelac |
| 23 | MF | CRO | Ilan Pejić |
| 24 | FW | CRO | Dominik Rešetar |
| 25 | MF | CRO | Marko Uzelac |
| 26 | DF | KSA | Bandar Darwish |
| 27 | FW | CRO | Filip Soldo |
| 28 | MF | CRO | Tomislav Mazalović |
| 29 | MF | CRO | Sacha Marasović |
| 31 | DF | CRO | Luka Leon Kovač |
| 33 | DF | ARG | Gonzalo Gamarra (on loan from Slaven Belupo) |
| 35 | GK | CRO | Fran Gelo |
| - | MF | SVN | Rai Rudonja |

== Notable players ==
Years in brackets indicate their spells at the club.

- Ivan Cvjetković (CRO) (1991–93)
- Krunoslav Jurčić (CRO) (1991–93)
- Zvonimir Soldo (CRO) (1991–94)
- Jozo Bogdanović (CRO) (1992–95)
- Nermin Šabić (BIH) (1994–95)
- Željko Adžić (CRO) (1996–97)
- Eduardo (CRO) (2002–03)
- Tomislav Dujmović (CRO) (2003–05)
- Srđan Pecelj (BIH) (2003–05; 2008–10)
- Ivan Radeljić (BIH) (2003–04; 2004–05)
- Želimir Terkeš (BIH) (2003–04)
- Klemen Lavrič (SLO) (2004)
- Hrvoje Čale (CRO) (2004–05)
- Vedran Ćorluka (CRO) (2004–05)
- Luka Modrić (CRO) (2004–05)
- Damir Krznar (CRO) (2004–10)
- Vedran Ješe (CRO) (2005–06)
- Veldin Karić (CRO) (2005–07)
- Zoran Zekić (CRO) (2005; 2006)
- Petar Krpan (CRO) (2006–07)
- Ivan Santini (CRO) (2006–07)
- Dejan Lovren (CRO) (2006–08)
- Marijo Dodik (BIH) (2008–09)
- Nino Bule (CRO) (2008–09)
- Saša Balić (MNE) (2009–12)
- Matej Delač (CRO) (2009–10)
- Aleksandar Trajkovski (MKD) (2010–11)
- Ante Budimir (CRO) (2011–2013)
- Nikola Pokrivač (CRO) (2013)
- Nikola Šafarić (CRO) (2015)
- Ilija Nestorovski (MKD) (2013–16)
- Jakov Filipović (CRO) (2016–17)
- Jakov Puljić (CRO) (2016–17)
- Komnen Andrić (SER) (2017–19; 2020)
- Josip Brezovec (CRO) (2018–19)
- Ivan Kelava (CRO) (2018–19)

== Technical staff ==
As of April 2022

| Position | Staff |
|---|---|
| Sporting director | (Croatia) Đuro Bago |
| Head coach | (Croatia) Borimir Perković |
| Assistant coach | (Croatia) Tomislav Gondžić |
| Assistant coach | (Croatia) Igor Bubnjić |
| Assistant coach | (Croatia) Viktor Novačić |
| Goalkeeping coach | (Croatia) Dragutin Pavalić |
| First team doctor | (Croatia) Tomislav Vlahović |
| First team doctor | (Croatia) Marko Matoic |
| First team doctor | (Croatia) Dejan Blažević |
| Physiotherapist | (Croatia) Nikola Štok |
| Physiotherapist | (Croatia) Nikola Fotivec |
| Academy coach | (Croatia) Srećko Bogdan |

Source: inter.hr

== Recent coaching history ==
- Josip Kuže (CRO) (July 2003 – May 2004)
- Srećko Bogdan (CRO) (July 2004 – June 2006)
- Ante Čačić (CRO) (October 2006 – August 2007)
- Milivoj Bračun (CRO) (August 2007 – October 2008)
- Borimir Perković (CRO) (October 2008 – April 2010)
- Ilija Lončarević (CRO) (April 2010 – April 2012)
- Borimir Perković (CRO) (April 2012 – March 2013)
- Rajko Magić (CRO) (March 2013 – November 2013)
- Damir Mužek (CRO) (November 2013 – April 2014)
- Samir Toplak (CRO) (April 2014 – January 2020)
- Željko Petrović (MNE) (January 2020 – April 2020)
- Tomislav Ivković (CRO) (April 2020 – March 2021)
- Ilija Lončarević (CRO) (March 2021 – June 2021)
- Mirko Labrović (CRO) (June 2021 – September 2021)
- Borimir Perković (CRO) (September 2021 – Present)
