= Miljenko Mihić =

Bosnian Croat football coach (1933–2009)

Personal information
- Date of birth: November 30, 1933
- Place of birth: Ilići, Yugoslavia (now Bosnia and Herzegovina)
- Date of death: December 17, 2009 (aged 76)
- Place of death: Belgrade, Serbia

Managerial career
- Years: Team
- 1974–1975: Red Star Belgrade
- 1975–1976: Borac Banja Luka
- 1977–1979: Osijek
- 1980: Osijek
- 1980: Napredak Kruševac
- 1983: Galenika Zemun
- 1986–1988: Israel

Miljenko Mihić (November 30, 1933 – December 17, 2009) was a Bosnian Croat football coach.

== Coaching career ==
=== Red Star Belgrade ===
Mihić had worked as a coach in the youth categories of Red Star Belgrade for a decade, before he became the head coach of the first team in May 1974, at the end of the 1973–74 Yugoslav First League season, following the departure of the longtime coach Miljan Miljanić to Real Madrid. In the season 1974–75 Mihić led Red Star to the 1974–75 European Cup Winners' Cup semi-finals. During the competition, Red Star eliminated PAOK, Avenir Beggen and, most notably, Real Madrid, that was coached by Miljan Miljanić, Mihić's predecessor at the Red Star bench. After a 2–0 loss in Madrid, Red Star won by the same result in the return leg, and the match was decided when goalkeeper Ognjen Petrović saved Santillana's kick in the penalty shootout. In the semi-finals, Red Star got eliminated by the Hungarian side Ferencváros, but the reported attendance of 110,000 spectators at the return match at the Red Star Stadium remains the largest one at any game in the history of Serbian and Yugoslav football. The score of the first match was 2–1 for Ferencváros, and in the return leg the Hungarians scored from the last minute penalty kick, thus eliminating Red Star, 4–3 on aggregate. Although it was one of the biggest international successes in the club history that far, at the end of the season Red Star came third in the national championship, and that wasn't seen as good enough for Mihić to keep his job. After 11 years in the club, Mihić left Red Star.

=== Later career ===
After the departure from Red Star Belgrade, Mihić has coached several Yugoslav First League clubs, such as Borac Banja Luka, Osijek, Napredak Kruševac and Galenika. Notably, he contributed to the first European cup appearance of Borac Banja Luka, when the club reached the second round of the 1975–76 European Cup Winners' Cup, where it was eliminated by the eventual competition winner, Anderlecht. Anderlecht suffered their only defeat of the competition in the second leg 1–0 loss against Borac, but Anderlecht still went through 3–1 on aggregate.

Mihić was the coach of Israel national football team from 1986 to 1988. He has also coached Yugoslavia national under-21 football team for several years and was an assistant coach of Yugoslavia national football team.

== Personal life ==
Miljenko Mihić has spent his last years in Belgrade with his wife Rozika, with whom he had a son, Dragan. He died in Belgrade after a long illness, December 17, 2009. He was buried December 23, 2009 at the Smrčenjaci cemetery in his hometown Mostar on his own wish.

Mihić has published a book of his poetry entitled Mostar u srcu (Mostar in the Heart).
