= Mustafa Arslanović =

Bosnian footballer

Personal information
- Date of birth: 24 February 1960 (age 66)
- Place of birth: Bosanski Novi, Yugoslavia
- Height: 1.87 m (6 ft 2 in)
- Position: Defender

Senior career*
| Years | Team | Apps | (Gls) |
| 1980–1983 | Dinamo Zagreb | 15 | (0) |
| 1983–1984 | → NK Zagreb (loan) | 13 | (3) |
| 1984–1988 | Dinamo Zagreb | 108 | (4) |
| 1988–1991 | Ascoli | 82 | (1) |
| 1991–1994 | Hallescher FC | | |
| 1994–1996 | Bonner SC | 35 | (1) |

International career
| 1987 | Yugoslavia | 1 | (0) |
- * Club domestic league appearances and goals

Mustafa Arslanović (born 24 February 1960) is a retired Bosnian footballer. A defender, he played for SFR Yugoslavia.

== International career ==
Arslanović earned his first and only international cap on 25 March 1987 with SFR Yugoslavia in a winning game against Austria.
