= Vlado Kasalo =

Croatian footballer (born 1962)

Personal information
- Full name: Vladimir Kasalo
- Date of birth: 11 November 1962 (age 63)
- Place of birth: SFR Yugoslavia
- Height: 1.86 m (6 ft 1 in)
- Position: Centre back

Youth career
- 1982-1983: Olimpija Osijek

Senior career*
Years	Team	Apps	(Gls)
1983–1987	Osijek	93	(12)
1987–1989	Dinamo Zagreb	49	(8)
1989–1991	1. FC Nürnberg	22	(1)
1992–1994	Mainz 05	55	(5)

International career
1987	Yugoslavia	1	(0)
1990	Croatia	2	(0)
- * Club domestic league appearances and goals

Vladimir 'Vlado' Kasalo (born 11 November 1962) is a Croatian former professional footballer who played as a central defender.

== Club career ==
After representing NK Osijek and Dinamo Zagreb in his country, Kasalo was sold by the latter to Germany's 1. FC Nürnberg, for 1 million Deutsche Mark. In his second season, he infamously scored two consecutive own goals in as many matches: on 16 March 1991, at VfB Stuttgart (1–0 loss) and on 23 March, against Karlsruher SC (2–ß loss). He was suspected to have done that on purpose to pay off his gambling debts, although it was never proven.

Kasalo retired in the same country at only 31, with 2. Bundesliga's Mainz 05.

== International career ==
Kasalo's only cap for Yugoslavia came in a friendly against the Soviet Union, on 29 August 1987. He added two for newly formed Croatia, in the 1990 friendly games against the United States, the nation's first, and Romania. Both unofficial, since Croatia was still part of Yugoslavia at the time.
