= Dragan Lepinjica =

Serbian footballer

Personal information
- Full name: Dragan Lepinjica
- Date of birth: 15 August 1961 (age 65)
- Place of birth: Šid, PR Serbia, FPR Yugoslavia
- Position: Forward

Senior career*
Years	Team	Apps	(Gls)
1982–1987	Osijek	58	(16)
1987	Dinamo Zagreb	7	(0)
1988–1989	Priština	31	(6)
1989–1990	Osijek	30	(5)
1990–1996	União Madeira	135	(25)
1996–1997	Machico	20	(1)
Total		281	(53)
- * Club domestic league appearances and goals

Dragan Lepinjica (Serbian Cyrillic: Драган Лепињица, born 15 August 1961) is a former Serbian football player.

Born in Šid, he played with Osijek, Dinamo Zagreb and Priština in the Yugoslav First League during the 1980s, and in 1990 he moved to Portugal where he played with União in the Primeira Liga until 1996.

His son Ivan, born in 1999, is also a footballer.

== External sources ==
- Dragan Lepinjica at Povijest Dinama
- Yugoslav First and Second League stats at B92
