= NK Osijek =

Association football club in Croatia

Osijek
- Full name: Nogometni klub Osijek (Osijek Football Club)
- Nicknames: Bijelo-plavi (The White and blues)
- Short name: OSI
- Founded: 27 February 1947; 79 years ago
- Ground: Opus Arena
- Capacity: 13,005
- Owner: NK OS d.o.o.
- President: Alexandra Végh
- Manager: Federico Bessone
- League: Croatian Football League
- 2025–26: Croatian Football League, 9th of 10
- Website: www.nk-osijek.hr

Nogometni klub Osijek (English: Osijek Football Club), commonly referred to as NK Osijek (Croatian pronunciation: [ôsijeːk]), is a Croatian professional football club from Osijek. They compete in the Croatian Football League (HNL), the top tier of Croatian football. Founded in 1947, it was the club from Slavonia with the most seasons in the Yugoslav First League and, after the independence of Croatia in 1992, it is one of the four clubs that have never been relegated from the HNL, with the others being Dinamo Zagreb, Hajduk Split and Rijeka.

== History ==
=== 1947–1976 ===
NK Osijek was founded on 27 February 1945 as NK Udarnik on the tradition of banned JŠK Slavija Osijek, which was founded in 1916 and played in the first Yugoslavia League seven times between 1923 and 1941. In 1946, the club had been merged with Jedinstvo and changed its name to NK Slavonija. The conventional anniversary of the club is considered to be the following year on 27 February 1947, when NK Slavonija and NK Bratstvo merged to form FK Proleter. The first match played under that name comes the 16th of March of that same year, when Proleter beat city rivals Mladost by five goals to nil. The first competition in which the club participated in was the Osječko Okružno Prvenstvo, along with four other teams. The club got into the second national league soon after. Proleter achieved placement into the Yugoslav First League in 1953, having won the so-called Croato-Slovenian League. The best players from that side were Andrija Vekić, Franjo Rupnik, Dionizije Dvornić and Franjo Majer. Proleter played in the First League for three seasons, but were then relegated to the second division.

Proleter moved to current Gradski vrt stadium in autumn 1958 and changed its name to Slavonija as part of the unifying process of the boxing, athletics and Olympic lifting club in a newly founded sports association in 1962. It still plays in the second league. Five years later the association is disbanded and the club took on the name NK Osijek. The then-colours red and blue were switched to current colours blue and white.

In 1970, Osijek won the 2nd North League Championship. However, Borac Banja Luka beat them in the promotion play-offs. One year later, Bijelo-plavi tried for promotion again, winning in a penalty shoot-out against Rijeka, but end up being stopped by Vardar. The next time Osijek reached the promotion play-offs was in 1973. It went to the final round, beating FC Prishtina. Following their victory, NK Osijek was set to meet NK Zagreb at Stadion Maksimir in Zagreb. A record-breaking 64,129 tickets were sold with approximately 20,000 of them going to Osijek supporters. NK Zagreb proved victorious on the day, winning via a penalty shoot-out following a 2–2 draw after 90 minutes, Osijek denied promotion for a third time in four years.

=== 1977–1991 ===
In 1977, NK Osijek finally secured its return to the top flight by taking out the league championship. It eventually stayed competitive in the Yugoslav League up until the Croatian War of Independence, except for the season of 1979–80, when Osijek fought back into the premier league after failing to stay in it. The club was present in the second part of the First League ladder in the 80s, except for 1984, when the team placed sixth, headed by Davidović, Lulić, Džeko, Lepinjica, Rakela, Karačić and team captain Kalinić. In 1989, the team placed eighth with Davor Šuker leading the line for the side scoring 18 goals, taking out the league's best goalscorer award. Šuker is the only player in NK Osijek history to take out the award. During the last season of the YFL, NK Osijek finished ninth.

=== 1992–1999 ===
After the dissolution of SFR Yugoslavia, the Croatian First Football League was formed and the first season was played in 1992. Due to the war, it was a shortened season played from February to June. NK Osijek was unable to play in Osijek due to the war, so they had to play in the cities of Đakovo, Donji Miholjac and Kutjevo. Osijek finished the 1992 Croatian First League season in 3rd placed, six points behind NK Zagreb and nine behind league champions Hajduk Split. Osijek's top goalscorer was Robert Špehar, who finished the season with nine goals.

NK Osijek quickly became one of the top four Croatian football teams, with one of its best ever seasons came in the 1994–95. The Bijelo plavi finished in third place, only six points behind first-placed Hajduk. Špehar scored 23 goals to become the league's top goalscorer. The greats of NK Osijek during that time were–a part from Špehar–Žitnjak, Lulić, Beljan, Ergović, Rupnik, Beširević, Bičanić and Labak. As a result of the third-placed finish, NK Osijek qualified for the 1995–96 UEFA Cup. It faced Slovan Bratislava in the preliminary round, going down 6–0.

Osijek finished third in the 1997–98 Croatian First League, qualifying for the 1998–99 UEFA Cup. Osijek came up against Anderlecht. After a famous 3–1 victory at home in front of 15,000 supporters, Osijek lost 2–0 in Belgium and were knocked-out on away goals. In 1998–99, Osijek attained its first trophy, the Croatian Cup, following a victory over Cibalia 2–0. One year later, West Ham United was playing away in Gradski vrt, headed by Frank Lampard, Rio Ferdinand, Trevor Sinclair, Paolo Di Canio, Paulo Wanchope and Igor Štimac.

=== 2000–2015 ===
In the 2000–01 UEFA Cup, NK Osijek beat Brøndby 2–1 (2–1, 0–0) and Rapid Wien 4–1 (2–1, 2–0). In the 3rd round, Osijek beat Slavia Prague 2–0 at home, but lost 5–1 in Prague. Osijek finished third in the league once more. In the 2001–02 UEFA Cup, Osijek progressed past Dinaburg on away goals, beat Gorica in the first round, but then lost 3–5 to AEK Athens. In the 2003–04 HNL, Osijek had the first and second highest goalscorers in the division with Špehar scoring 18 and Goran Ljubojević scoring 16. The club then went through a long phase of mid-table finishes and mediocre results.

NK Osijek was almost relegated during the 2013–14 season. On the final match day, Josip Barišić eventually scored and keep Osijek afloat against Hrvatski dragovoljac. Osijek changed coaches on four occasions throughout the season. The following season, Osijek once again finished one position above the relegation play-off spot, finishing one point ahead of Istra 1961.

=== 2015–present ===
In September 2015, Zoran Zekić was appointed as the first team head coach, replacing Dražen Besek.

With the club facing bankruptcy, Osijek went into private ownership for the first time in its history in February 2016 with Hungarian oligarch Lőrinc Mészáros and Croatian entrepreneur Ivan Meštrović buying a majority of shares in the club. The duo went about stabilizing the club, improving the squad and bringing back ambition to the city and supporters. Much of the debt was restructured and paid off, securing the short-term and long-term future of Osijek.

On 27 February 2017, the club celebrated its 70th anniversary in the Osijek theater. In the 2016–17 season, Osijek finished fourth, which was their highest league finish in nearly 10 years. The 4th-place finish led to Osijek participating in the qualifying phase of the 2017–18 UEFA Europa League; with the club staging an extremely successful run to the play-off round, beating Santa Coloma, Luzern and PSV, the former champions of Europe, who won the 1987–88 edition. The club ended its unbeaten run following a 1–2 home loss against Austria Wien, and despite the club winning the second leg 1–0, Osijek were eliminated on the away goals rule. Despite being eliminated, Osijek were praised and congratulated by Croatian press, fans and media for their historic run.

In the 2017–18 season, Osijek finished 4th again, securing a place in the UEFA competition. Osijek beat Petrocub Hîncești 2–1 at home after a draw the first leg in Moldova 1–1, and faced Rangers in the second qualifying round of the 2018–19 UEFA Europa League. Osijek lost the home leg 1–0.

After a bad start to the 2020–21 season, during which Osijek managed only a single point after the first three games of the season, manager Ivica Kulešević was sacked. On 5 September 2020, Osijek appointed Nenad Bjelica as the new club manager.

On 9 September 2020, it was announced that Lőrinc Mészáros was no longer the formal co-owner of the club, with the private investment fund BETA taking over his shares in NK OS d.o.o. The reason being that Mészáros was also the owner of Puskás Akadémia FC, and UEFA rules forbade two clubs owned by the same person from participating in European competitions, should they have both qualified.

The heaviest defeat in NK Osijek’s history in the Croatian First Football League occurred on 4 April 2026, when the club lost 0–7 to GNK Dinamo Zagreb in the 28th round of the 2025–26 SuperSport HNL. This result marked Osijek’s worst league defeat in the modern Croatian league era.

== Stadium ==
NK Osijek plays its home games at Stadion Gradski vrt, where it played its first game on the 7 September 1958 against Sloboda. The stadium was officially opened in 1980.

The current design was made in 1979. The upper western tribune is unfinished to this day. The current capacity lies at 18,856 spectator seats, with 980 of them being for standing audiences. Before the club had transferred to Gradski vrt, Osijek played on a pitch next to the river Drava.

In April 2018, NK Osijek president Ivan Meštrović released plans for the new Pampas Stadium. A new state of art stadium was built at the Pampas neighbourhood in Osijek as part of the new NK Osijek training centre. The capacity of the new stadium was 12,000, with all of the seats covered. The stadium was UEFA category four and finished in June 2021. During the stadium construction, NK Osijek played its home matches at Gradski vrt stadium, which was used as the main stadium for NK Osijek B.

== Supporters ==
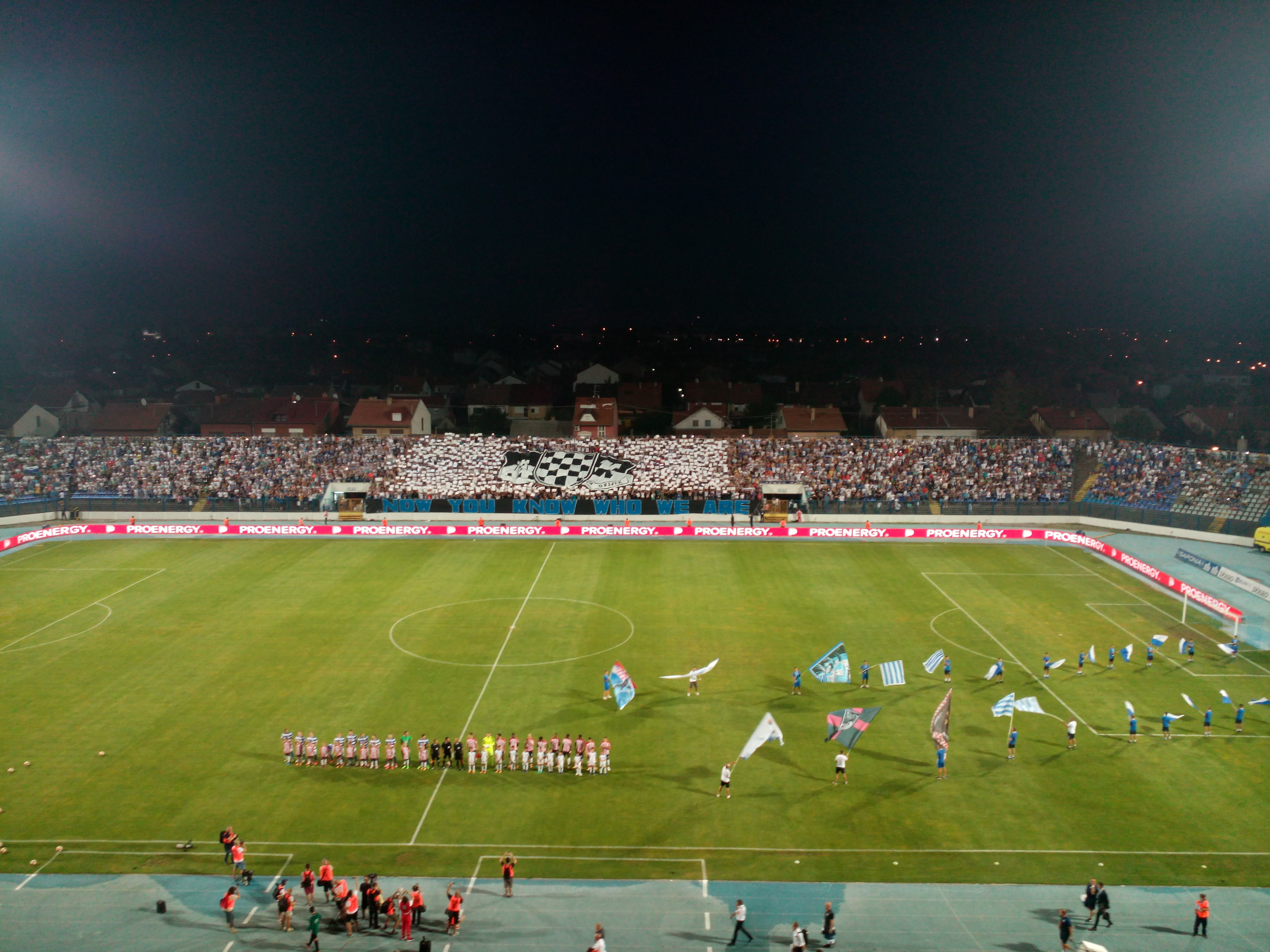
Kohorta fans at the stands of Stadion Gradski vrt before the match against PSV in 2017

The fan club of NK Osijek is called Kohorta (cohort, named after the Roman army unit composed of 360 soldiers). It was founded in 1972 under the name Šokci, and carries the name Kohorta since 1988. Kohorta is usually situated on the eastern tribune of Gradski vrt. Its seat is in the university street in Tvrđa, Osijek.

Osijek is the third most supported football club in Croatia with 5% of population supporting it.

== Rivalries ==
The Slavonian derby is a match between the two largest Croatian football clubs from eastern Croatia, Osijek and Cibalia.

Osijek–Rijeka derby is the name given to matches between Osijek and HNK Rijeka. On Croatian First Football League all-time table, Rijeka and Osijek were on the third and fourth place. Along with Dinamo Zagreb and Hajduk Split, Rijeka and Osijek were the only four clubs that have never been relegated from the Croatian First League. Osijek and Rijeka are third and fourth best supported football clubs in Croatia, with the former being supported by 5% and the latter by 4% of population.

== Kit manufacturers and sponsors ==
| Period | Provider | Sponsor |
|---|---|---|
| 1996–1998 | Diadora | Gradska banka |
| 1998 | Umbro | Gradska banka |
| 1999 | Umbro | Panturist |
| 1999–2000 | Umbro | Veritas osiguranje |
| 2000–2001 | Puma | Osijek Koteks |
| 2001–2002 | Diadora | Osječko pivo |
| 2002–2004 | S9 | T Mobile |
| 2004–2005 | Legea | |
| 2005–2006 | Macron | T-com |
| 2006–2008 | Kappa | Croatia osiguranje |
| 2008–2010 | Legea | Croatia osiguranje |
| 2010–2011 | Kappa | Croatia osiguranje |
| 2011–2015 | Jako | |
| 2016–2017 | Nike | Osječko 1664 |
| 2017–2020 | Nike | Dobro, Mészáros és Mészáros Kft. |
| 2020– | 2Rule | Mészáros és Mészáros Kft., Stadler |

== Honours ==
Osijek has won one Croatian Cup. In European competitions, the club reached the third round of the UEFA Cup in 2000–01, the second round of the Intertoto Cup in 2006, the third place of the Mitropa Cup in 1981–82 and play-off round of the UEFA Europa League in 2017–18.

=== Domestic ===
Croatian football league system

- Croatian First League
  - Runners-up (1): 2020–21
- Croatian Cup
  - Winner (1): 1998–99
  - Runners-up (1): 2011–12

Yugoslav football league system

- Yugoslav Second League
  - Winner (5): 1952–53, 1969–70, 1972–73, 1976–77, 1980–81

=== Best results in European competitions ===
| Season | Achievement | Notes |
UEFA Cup / Europa League
| 2000–01 | Third round | lost to (Czech Republic) Slavia Prague 2–0 in Osijek, 1–5 in Prague |
| 2017–18 | Play-off round | lost to Austria Wien 1–2 in Osijek, 1–0 in Sankt Pölten |

Notable wins

| Season | Match | Score |
Europa League / UEFA Cup
| 1998–99 | Osijek – (Belgium) Anderlecht | 3 – 1 |
| 2000–01 | Osijek – (Austria) Rapid Wien | 2 – 1 |
| 2000–01 | Osijek – (Czech Republic) Slavia Prague | 2 – 0 |
| 2017–18 | Osijek – (Netherlands) PSV | 1 – 0 |

== Recent seasons ==
| Season | League | | | | | | | | | Cup | European competitions | | Top goalscorer | |
| Season | Division | P | W | D | L | F | A | Pts | Pos | Cup | European competitions | | Player | Goals |
|---|---|---|---|---|---|---|---|---|---|---|---|---|---|---|
| 1992 | 1. HNL | 22 | 12 | 3 | 7 | 33 | 28 | 27 | 3rd | QF | | | Robert Špehar | 9 |
| 1992–93 | 1. HNL | 30 | 11 | 7 | 12 | 40 | 42 | 29 | 6th | QF | | | Alen Petrović | 10 |
| 1993–94 | 1. HNL | 34 | 12 | 11 | 11 | 56 | 58 | 35 | 8th | R2 | | | Antun Labak | 16 |
| 1994–95 | 1. HNL | 30 | 16 | 11 | 3 | 65 | 30 | 59 | 3rd | SF | | | Robert Špehar | 23 |
| 1995–96 | 1. A HNL | 32 | 16 | 4 | 12 | 51 | 32 | 52 | 4th | QF | UEFA Cup | QR | Igor Pamić | 17 |
| 1996–97 | 1. A HNL | 30 | 12 | 5 | 13 | 40 | 38 | 41 | 8th | SF | | | Dumitru Mitu | 10 |
| 1997–98 | 1. HNL | 32 | 14 | 6 | 12 | 42 | 38 | 48 | 3rd | R1 | | | Petar Krpan | 10 |
| 1998–99 | 1. HNL | 32 | 14 | 6 | 12 | 51 | 39 | 48 | 4th | W | UEFA Cup | QR2 | Stanko Bubalo | 10 |
| 1999–00 | 1. HNL | 33 | 15 | 8 | 10 | 55 | 49 | 53 | 3rd | QF | UEFA Cup | R1 | Stanko Bubalo | 13 |
| 2000–01 | 1. HNL | 32 | 17 | 6 | 9 | 61 | 47 | 57 | 3rd | SF | UEFA Cup | R3 | Nenad Bjelica, Marijan Vuka | 9 |
| 2001–02 | 1. HNL | 30 | 11 | 4 | 15 | 45 | 48 | 37 | 8th | SF | UEFA Cup | R2 | Milan Pavličić | 9 |
| 2002–03 | 1. HNL | 32 | 10 | 9 | 13 | 32 | 51 | 39 | 8th | QF | | | Milan Pavličić | 11 |
| 2003–04 | 1. HNL | 32 | 11 | 6 | 15 | 50 | 57 | 39 | 4th | QF | | | Robert Špehar | 18 |
| 2004–05 | 1. HNL | 32 | 9 | 14 | 9 | 41 | 45 | 41 | 8th | SF | | | Karlo Primorac | 11 |
| 2005–06 | 1. HNL | 32 | 13 | 5 | 14 | 31 | 48 | 44 | 4th | QF | | | Josip Balatinac | 6 |
| 2006–07 | 1. HNL | 33 | 11 | 10 | 12 | 42 | 45 | 43 | 6th | R2 | Intertoto Cup | R2 | Stjepan Jukić | 9 |
| 2007–08 | 1. HNL | 33 | 16 | 6 | 11 | 43 | 34 | 54 | 3rd | R2 | | | Vedran Nikšić | 8 |
| 2008–09 | 1. HNL | 33 | 10 | 11 | 12 | 40 | 41 | 41 | 7th | R1 | | | Josip Barišić | 8 |
| 2009–10 | 1. HNL | 30 | 13 | 8 | 9 | 49 | 36 | 47 | 5th | QF | | | Josip Barišić, Ivan Miličević, Vedran Nikšić | 8 |
| 2010–11 | 1. HNL | 30 | 9 | 12 | 9 | 31 | 29 | 39 | 8th | QF | | | Ivan Miličević | 5 |
| 2011–12 | 1. HNL | 30 | 11 | 10 | 9 | 45 | 38 | 43 | 8th | RU | | | Antonio Perošević | 7 |
| 2012–13 | 1. HNL | 33 | 9 | 12 | 12 | 25 | 33 | 39 | 7th | QF | Europa League | QR2 | Antonio Perošević, Zoran Kvržić | 4 |
| 2013–14 | 1. HNL | 36 | 8 | 9 | 19 | 38 | 64 | 33 | 8th | QF | | | Josip Barišić | 6 |
| 2014–15 | 1. HNL | 36 | 10 | 6 | 20 | 42 | 59 | 36 | 8th | R2 | | | Antonio Perošević, Aljoša Vojnović | 6 |
| 2015–16 | 1. HNL | 36 | 7 | 13 | 16 | 27 | 49 | 34 | 8th | QF | | | Antonio Perošević | 6 |
| 2016–17 | 1. HNL | 36 | 20 | 6 | 10 | 52 | 37 | 66 | 4th | SF | | | Muzafer Ejupi | 14 |
| 2017–18 | 1. HNL | 36 | 14 | 14 | 8 | 53 | 38 | 56 | 4th | QF | Europa League | PO | Haris Hajradinović | 9 |
| 2018–19 | 1. HNL | 36 | 18 | 8 | 10 | 61 | 36 | 62 | 3rd | SF | Europa League | QR2 | Mirko Marić | 18 |
| 2019–20 | 1. HNL | 36 | 17 | 11 | 8 | 47 | 29 | 62 | 4th | SF | Europa League | QR2 | Mirko Marić | 20 |
| 2020–21 | 1. HNL | 36 | 23 | 8 | 5 | 59 | 25 | 77 | 2nd | QF | Europa League | QR2 | Ramón Miérez | 22 |
| 2021–22 | 1. HNL | 36 | 19 | 12 | 5 | 49 | 29 | 69 | 3rd | SF | Europa Conference League | QR3 | Mihael Žaper, Mijo Caktaš | 5 |
| 2022–23 | HNL | 36 | 13 | 11 | 12 | 46 | 41 | 50 | 3rd | QF | Europa Conference League | QR2 | Ramón Miérez | 12 |
| 2023–24 | HNL | 36 | 16 | 9 | 11 | 62 | 43 | 57 | 4th | QF | Europa Conference League | QR3 | Ramón Miérez | 19 |
| 2024–25 | HNL | 36 | 11 | 9 | 16 | 46 | 52 | 42 | 7th | SF | Conference League | QR3 | Arnel Jakupović | 9 |
| 2025–26 | HNL | 36 | 8 | 11 | 17 | 27 | 49 | 35 | 9th | R2 | | | Nail Omerović | 8 |

Key

League: P = Matches played; W = Matches won; D = Matches drawn; L = Matches lost; F = Goals for; A = Goals against; Pts = Points won; Pos = Final position;
Cup / Europe: PR = Preliminary round; QR = Qualifying round; R1 = First round; R2 = Second round; QF = Quarter-final; SF = Semi-final; RU = Runner-up; W = Competition won;

== European competitions ==
=== Summary ===
| Competition | Pld | W | D | L | GF | GA | Last season played |
|---|---|---|---|---|---|---|---|
| UEFA Cup / UEFA Europa League | 37 | 18 | 3 | 16 | 45 | 48 | 2020–21 |
| UEFA Europa Conference League | 14 | 7 | 4 | 3 | 22 | 20 | 2023–24 |
| UEFA Intertoto Cup | 2 | 0 | 2 | 0 | 2 | 2 | 2006 |
| Total | 53 | 25 | 9 | 19 | 69 | 70 | |

Source:, Fully up to date on 15 August 2024.
Pld = Matches played; W = Matches won; D = Matches drawn; L = Matches lost; GF = Goals for; GA = Goals against. Defunct competitions indicated in italics.

=== By season ===
| Season | Competition | Round | Opponent | Home | Away | Agg. |
|---|---|---|---|---|---|---|
| 1995–96 | UEFA Cup | QR | (Slovakia) Slovan Bratislava | 0–2 | 0–4 | 0–6 |
| 1998–99 | UEFA Cup | QR2 | (Belgium) Anderlecht | 3–1 | 0–2 | 3–3 (a) |
| 1999–2000 | UEFA Cup | R1 | (England) West Ham United | 1–3 | 0–3 | 1–6 |
| 2000–01 | UEFA Cup | R1 | (Denmark) Brøndby | 0–0 | 2–1 | 2–1 |
| 2000–01 | UEFA Cup | R2 | (Austria) Rapid Wien | 2–1 | 2–0 | 4–1 |
| 2000–01 | UEFA Cup | R3 | (Czech Republic) Slavia Prague | 2–0 | 1–5 | 3–5 |
| 2001–02 | UEFA Cup | QR | (Latvia) Dinaburg | 1–0 | 1–2 | 2–2 (a) |
| 2001–02 | UEFA Cup | R1 | (Slovenia) Gorica | 1–0 | 2–1 | 3–1 |
| 2001–02 | UEFA Cup | R2 | (Greece) AEK Athens | 1–2 | 2–3 | 3–5 |
| 2006–07 | Intertoto Cup | R2 | (Cyprus) Ethnikos Achna | 2–2 | 0–0 | 2–2 (a) |
| 2012–13 | Europa League | QR1 | (Andorra) FC Santa Coloma | 3–1 | 1–0 | 4–1 |
| 2012–13 | Europa League | QR2 | (Sweden) Kalmar FF | 1–3 | 0–3 | 1–6 |
| 2017–18 | Europa League | QR1 | (Andorra) UE Santa Coloma | 4–0 | 2–0 | 6–0 |
| 2017–18 | Europa League | QR2 | (Switzerland) Luzern | 2–0 | 1–2 | 3–2 |
| 2017–18 | Europa League | QR3 | (Netherlands) PSV Eindhoven | 1–0 | 1–0 | 2–0 |
| 2017–18 | Europa League | PO | Austria Wien | 1–2 | 1–0 | 2–2 (a) |
| 2018–19 | Europa League | QR1 | (Moldova) Petrocub Hîncești | 2–1 | 1–1 | 3–2 |
| 2018–19 | Europa League | QR2 | (Scotland) Rangers | 0–1 | 1–1 | 1–2 |
| 2019–20 | Europa League | QR2 | (Bulgaria) CSKA Sofia | 1–0 | 0–1 | 1–1 (3–4 p) |
| 2020–21 | Europa League | QR2 | (Switzerland) Basel | 1–2 | | |
| 2021–22 | Europa Conference League | QR2 | (Poland) Pogoń Szczecin | 1–0 | 0–0 | 1–0 |
| 2021–22 | Europa Conference League | QR3 | (Bulgaria) CSKA Sofia | 1–1 | 2–4 | 3–5 |
| 2022–23 | Europa Conference League | QR2 | (Kazakhstan) Kyzylzhar | 0–2 | 2–1 | 2–3 |
| 2023–24 | Europa Conference League | QR2 | (Hungary) Zalaegerszeg | 1–0 | 2–1 | 3−1 |
| 2023–24 | Europa Conference League | QR3 | (Turkey) Adana Demirspor | 3–2 | 1–5 | 4–7 |
| 2024–25 | Conference League | QR2 | (Estonia) Levadia | 5–1 | 1–0 | 6–1 |
| 2024–25 | Conference League | QR3 | (Azerbaijan) Zira | 1–1 | 2–2 | 3–3 (1–2 p) |

Last updated on 15 August 2024.

=== Player records ===
- Most appearances in UEFA club competitions: 18 appearances
  - Petar Bočkaj, Mile Škorić
- Top scorers in UEFA club competitions: 4 goals
  - Ramón Miérez, Muzafer Ejupi, Petar Bočkaj

=== UEFA coefficient ===
Correct as of 5 July 2026.

| Rank | Team | Points |
|---|---|---|
| 218 | (Hungary) Puskás Akadémia | 5.500 |
| 219 | (Azerbaijan) Zira | 5.500 |
| 220 | (Croatia) Osijek | 5.500 |
| 221 | (Switzerland) St. Gallen | 5.390 |
| 222 | (Switzerland) Zürich | 5.390 |

== Players ==
=== Current squad ===
As of 19 September 2026

Note: Flags indicate national team as defined under FIFA eligibility rules; some limited exceptions apply. Players may hold more than one non-FIFA nationality.

| No. | Pos. | Nation | Player |
|---|---|---|---|
| 1 | GK | CAN | Nikola Ćurčija |
| 2 | DF | GER | Marcel Heister |
| 6 | MF | COL | David Mejía |
| 7 | FW | CRO | Ivan Dolček |
| 8 | MF | CRO | Šimun Mikolčić |
| 9 | FW | CRO | Ivan Barić |
| 10 | MF | CRO | Jona Ježić |
| 11 | MF | CRO | Luka Tunjić |
| 13 | MF | CRO | Vito Čaić |
| 16 | MF | UKR | Oleksandr Petrusenko |
| 18 | MF | CRO | Niko Farkaš |
| 20 | GK | CRO | Jan Hlapčić |
| 21 | FW | ESP | Alejandro Cantero |
| 22 | DF | NED | Jay Kruiver |
| 23 | MF | CRO | Luka Vrbančić |

| No. | Pos. | Nation | Player |
|---|---|---|---|
| 24 | DF | CRO | Luka Posavec |
| 26 | DF | CRO | Luka Jelenić |
| 30 | FW | MKD | Admir Ljatifi |
| 31 | GK | CRO | Marko Malenica (captain) |
| 33 | DF | SWE | Emin Hasić |
| 34 | FW | CRO | Anton Matković |
| 39 | FW | CRO | Domagoj Bukvić |
| 47 | DF | CRO | David Kalem |
| 49 | DF | CRO | Ivano Kolarik |
| 67 | MF | HUN | Balázs Bakti |
| 77 | DF | BIH | Senad Mustafić |
| 79 | FW | MEX | Armando León |
| 98 | DF | CRO | Izak Ježić |
| 99 | FW | POR | Balelo |

=== Players with multiple nationalities ===
- (Sweden) (Bosnia and Herzegovina) Emin Hasić
- (Switzerland) (Senegal) Yannick Toure
- (Canada) (Croatia) Nikola Ćurčija
- (Bosnia and Herzegovina) (Austria) Senad Mustafić
- (Germany) (Croatia) Marcel Heister
- (Croatia) (Bosnia and Herzegovina) Luka Tunjić

=== Youth academy ===
The following players have previously made appearances or have appeared on the substitutes bench for the first team.

Note: Flags indicate national team as defined under FIFA eligibility rules; some limited exceptions apply. Players may hold more than one non-FIFA nationality.

| No. | Pos. | Nation | Player |
|---|---|---|---|
| 12 | GK | CRO | Jan Adžić |
| 17 | DF | CRO | Mateo Sabo |
| 19 | DF | CRO | Frane Nekić |

| No. | Pos. | Nation | Player |
|---|---|---|---|
| 42 | FW | CRO | Karlo Tomašević |
| 45 | DF | CRO | Šimun Begović |
| 46 | FW | CRO | Petar Turić |

=== Other players under contract ===
Note: Flags indicate national team as defined under FIFA eligibility rules; some limited exceptions apply. Players may hold more than one non-FIFA nationality.

| No. | Pos. | Nation | Player |
|---|---|---|---|
| — | FW | NGR | Justice Ohajunwa |

=== Out on loan ===
Note: Flags indicate national team as defined under FIFA eligibility rules; some limited exceptions apply. Players may hold more than one non-FIFA nationality.

| No. | Pos. | Nation | Player |
|---|---|---|---|
| 4 | DF | CRO | Krešimir Vrbanac (at (Croatia) Vukovar 1991 until 30 June 2027) |
| 5 | DF | ALB | Jon Mersinaj (at (Croatia) Slaven Belupo until 26 June 2027) |
| 40 | MF | CRO | Fran Peček (at (Croatia) Orijent until 30 June 2027) |
| — | GK | CRO | Matej Grahovac (at (Croatia) Mladost Ždralovi until 30 June 2027) |
| — | MF | HUN | Noel Keresztes (at (Slovenia) Nafta 1903 until 30 June 2027) |

| No. | Pos. | Nation | Player |
|---|---|---|---|
| — | MF | CRO | Andrej Mićić (at (Slovenia) Nafta 1903 until 30 June 2027) |
| — | MF | BUL | Stanislav Shopov (at (Bulgaria) Botev Plovdiv until 31 May 2027) |
| — | FW | SUI | Yannick Toure (at (Slovenia) Nafta 1903 until 30 June 2027) |
| — | FW | CRO | Marino Žeravica (at (Croatia) Mladost Ždralovi until 30 June 2027) |
| — | FW | CRO | Filip Živković (at (Bosnia and Herzegovina) Sarajevo until 10 January 2027) |

== Personnel ==
| Position | Staff |
|---|---|
| Sports director | Vacant |
| Performance department | (England) Paul White |
| Assistant sports director | (Hungary) Márk Makrai |
| Head coach | (Argentina) Federico Bessone |
| Assistant coach | (Spain) Enric Pi |
| Assistant coach | (Croatia) Vedran Jugović |
| Goalkeeping coach | (Croatia) Filip Šušnjara |
| Fitness coach | (Spain) Fran Núñez |
| Fitness coach | (Croatia) Marin Vučko |
| Analyst | (Croatia) Gabriel Gotovac |
| Analyst | (Croatia) Adrijan Topolovčan |
| Academy director | (Spain) Yago Aguilar Azón |
| Head of football operations | (Croatia) Mislav Leko |
| Chief of medical staff | (Croatia) Dr. Lovro Marinčić |
| Physiotherapist | (Croatia) Milan Marković |
| Physiotherapist | (Croatia) Marko Ovničević |
| Physiotherapist | (Croatia) Nikola Grgić |
| Kit manager | (Croatia) Ivica Vincek |
| Kit manager | (Croatia) Luka Tomas |
| Kit manager assistant | (Croatia) Zoran Stranjak |

== Football school ==
The football school of NK Osijek was founded in 1982 as the youth school. It was set in motion by Andrija Vekić, with the wish to recruit and create great players and coaches alike by creating a good and competitive atmosphere. Many players considered to be high-level were in that school.

== Notable players ==
Years in brackets indicate their spells at the club.

- (Socialist Federal Republic of Yugoslavia) Franjo Rupnik (1947–51)
- (Socialist Federal Republic of Yugoslavia) Ljupko Petrović (1967–79)
- (Socialist Federal Republic of Yugoslavia) Ratomir Dujković (1977–80)
- (Socialist Federal Republic of Yugoslavia) Ivica Miljković (1977–80)
- (Socialist Federal Republic of Yugoslavia) Mustafa Hukić (1978–81)
- (Socialist Federal Republic of Yugoslavia) Ivica Grnja (1972–82)
- (Socialist Federal Republic of Yugoslavia) Jasmin Džeko (1980–84, 1985–89)
- (Socialist Federal Republic of Yugoslavia) Vlado Kasalo (1983–87)
- (Socialist Federal Republic of Yugoslavia) Davor Šuker (1984–89)
- (Croatia) Robert Špehar (1988–92, 1994–95, 2002–04)
- (Croatia) Miroslav Bičanić (1989–92, 1994–96)
- (Bosnia and Herzegovina) (Bosnia and Herzegovina) Bakir Beširević (1992–94, 1994–02)
- (Croatia) Nenad Bjelica (1992–93, 1999–01)
- (Croatia) Davor Rupnik (1992–98)
- (Croatia) Damir Vuica (1992–94, 1997–02, 2005–08)
- (Croatia) Petar Krpan (1993–98, 2001)
- (Croatia) Mario Galinović (1993–02)
- (Croatia) Ivo Ergović (1994–01)
- (Croatia) Ronald Grnja (1994–04)
- (Croatia) Stjepan Vranješ (1992–99)
- (Croatia) Ivica Beljan (1994–96, 1997–00)
- (Croatia) Igor Pamić (1995–96)
- (Bosnia and Herzegovina) Nermin Šabić (1996–97)
- (Romania) Dumitru Mitu (1996–02)
- (Croatia) Jurica Vranješ (1997–00)
- (Croatia) Josip Balatinac (1997–06)
- (Croatia) Stanko Bubalo (1998–00)
- (Croatia) Mato Neretljak (2000–02)
- (Croatia) Marin Skender (2003–09)
- (Croatia) Valentin Babić (2004–09, 2013–14)
- (Croatia) Ivo Smoje (2005–09, 2010–13)
- (Croatia) Josip Barišić (2005–11, 2013–14)
- (Croatia) Tomislav Šorša (2006–16, 2017–20)
- (Croatia) Domagoj Vida (2006–10)
- (Croatia) Vedran Jugović (2007–13, 2019– )
- (Croatia) Hrvoje Kurtović (2008–16)
- (Croatia) Mile Škorić (2008–11, 2013–23)
- (Bosnia and Herzegovina) Zoran Kvržić (2010–13)
- (Croatia) Antonio Perošević (2010–17)
- (Croatia) Borna Barišić (2013–15, 2016–18)
- (Croatia) Nikola Matas (2014–18)
- (Croatia) Mateo Barać (2016–18)
- (North Macedonia) Muzafer Ejupi (2016–19)
- (Moldova) Mihail Caimacov (2018–21)
- (Kosovo) Mirlind Daku (2018–23)
- (Croatia) Ivica Ivušić (2019–23)
- (Hungary) László Kleinheisler (2019–23)
- (Slovenia) Damjan Bohar (2020–22)
- (Argentina) Ramón Miérez (2020–24)
- (Hungary) Ádám Gyurcsó (2021)
- (Slovenia) Mario Jurčević (2020–23)
- (Bosnia and Herzegovina) Adrian Leon Barišić (2018–23)
- (Armenia) Styopa Mkrtchyan (2023–25)
- (North Macedonia) Jovan Manev (2023–24)
- (Bosnia and Herzegovina) Nail Omerović (2021–26)
- (Bulgaria) Stanislav Shopov (2025-)

== Historical list of coaches ==
incomplete list

- (Socialist Federal Republic of Yugoslavia) Viktor Šter
- (Socialist Federal Republic of Yugoslavia) Blagoje Marjanović (1952–1953)
- (Socialist Federal Republic of Yugoslavia) Franjo Glaser
- (Socialist Federal Republic of Yugoslavia) Zorko Hlavač
- (Socialist Federal Republic of Yugoslavia) Mato Kasač
- (Socialist Federal Republic of Yugoslavia) Vladimir Beara
- (Socialist Federal Republic of Yugoslavia) Sima Milovanov
- (Socialist Federal Republic of Yugoslavia) Gustav Lechner (1945–49)
- (Socialist Federal Republic of Yugoslavia) Ernest Dubac (1951–55)
- (Socialist Federal Republic of Yugoslavia) Bernard Hügl (1955–56)
- (Socialist Federal Republic of Yugoslavia) Milan Antolković (1971–73)
- (Socialist Federal Republic of Yugoslavia) Miljenko Mihić (1977–79)
- (Socialist Federal Republic of Yugoslavia) Milan Đuričić (1979–80)
- (Socialist Federal Republic of Yugoslavia) Miljenko Mihić (1980)
- (Socialist Federal Republic of Yugoslavia) Josip Duvančić (1980–83)
- (Socialist Federal Republic of Yugoslavia) Milan Đuričić (1983–85)
- (Socialist Federal Republic of Yugoslavia) Ljupko Petrović (1985–87)
- (Socialist Federal Republic of Yugoslavia) Milan Đuričić (1987)
- (Socialist Federal Republic of Yugoslavia) Stjepan Čordaš (1989)
- (Socialist Federal Republic of Yugoslavia) Tonko Vukušić (1990)
- (Socialist Federal Republic of Yugoslavia) Šaban Jasenica (1990)
- (Socialist Federal Republic of Yugoslavia) Ivica Grnja (1991)
- (Croatia) Stjepan Čordaš (1992–93)
- (Croatia) Vlado Bilić (1993)
- (Croatia) Ivica Grnja (1993–94)
- (Croatia) Ivo Šušak (1993–95)
- (Croatia) Ivica Matković (1995–96)
- (Croatia) Ante Čačić (1995–96)
- (Croatia) Ivan Katalinić (1995–96)
- (Croatia) Goran Popović (1996–97)
- (Croatia) Luka Bonačić (1996–97)
- (Croatia) Milan Đuričić (1997–99), (Jun 2002 – Aug 2002)
- (Croatia) Stanko Poklepović (1998–00), (Nov 2002–03)
- (Croatia) Pavo Strugačevac (1999)
- (Croatia) Stanko Mršić (1999–01)
- (Croatia) Vlado Bilić (2000–02)
- (Croatia) Vjekoslav Lokica (2001–02)
- (Croatia) Miroslav Blažević (2001–02)
- (Croatia) Nenad Gračan (2002–03)
- (Croatia) Branko Karačić (2003–04)
- (Croatia) Stjepan Čordaš (2004–05)
- (Croatia) Ivo Šušak (July 1, 2005 – Nov 13, 2006)
- (Croatia) Miroslav Žitnjak (2006–07)
- (Croatia) Ilija Lončarević (Nov 14, 2006 – Sept 26, 2008)
- (Croatia) Tomislav Steinbrückner (Sept 26, 2008 – Aug 16, 2010)
- (Croatia) Branko Karačić (Aug 16, 2010 – May 2, 2011)
- (Croatia) Vlado Bilić (May 3, 2011 – Mar 31, 2012)
- (Croatia) Stanko Mršić (Mar 31, 2012 – May 13, 2013)
- (Croatia) Miroslav Žitnjak (interim) (May 13, 2013 – Jun 4, 2013)
- (Croatia) Tomislav Steinbrückner (Jun 4, 2013 – Aug 18, 2013)
- (Croatia) Davor Rupnik (Aug 19, 2013 – Oct 21, 2013)
- (Croatia) Ivica Kulešević (Oct 21, 2013 – Feb 27, 2014)
- (Croatia) Tomislav Rukavina (Feb 27, 2014 – Feb 11, 2015)
- (Croatia) Ivo Šušak (Feb 11, 2015 – Jun 1, 2015)
- (Croatia) Dražen Besek (Jun 14, 2015 – Sep 1, 2015)
- (Croatia) Zoran Zekić (Sep 1, 2015– Mar 29, 2019)
- (Croatia) Dino Skender (Mar 29, 2019 – Sep 21, 2019)
- (Croatia) Ivica Kulešević (Sep 23, 2019 – Sep 4, 2020)
- (Croatia) Nenad Bjelica (Sep 5, 2020 – Aug 29, 2022)
- (Austria) René Poms (Aug 29, 2022 – Mar 2, 2023)
- (Croatia) Ivica Kulešević (Sep 29, 2022 – Mar 2, 2023)
- (Croatia) Borimir Perković (Mar 2, 2023 – Apr 22, 2023)
- (Croatia) Stjepan Tomas (Apr 24, 2023 – Oct 3, 2023)
- (Croatia) Zoran Zekić (Oct 13, 2023 – May 21, 2024)
- (Italy) Federico Coppitelli (Jun 12, 2024 – Mar 19, 2025)
- (Slovenia) Simon Rožman (Mar 20, 2025 – Oct 29, 2025)
- (Croatia) Željko Sopić (Oct 29, 2025 – Feb 23, 2026)
- (Croatia) Tomislav Radotić (Feb 24, 2026 – Jun 11, 2026)
- (Argentina) Federico Bessone (Jun 23, 2026 – present)
