= Mustafa Agić =

Bosnian footballer (born 1966)

Personal information
- Date of birth: 8 April 1966 (age 60)
- Place of birth: Brčko, Yugoslavia
- Position: Forward

Senior career*
Years	Team	Apps	(Gls)
1985–1987	Jedinstvo Brčko	50	(8)
1988–1990	Dinamo Zagreb	24	(3)
1990–1992	Spartak Subotica	27	(1)
- Kavala
1993–1994	SF Eisbachtal		
1994–1996	Schweinfurt 05		
1996–1997	TuS Koblenz		
1997–199x	FC Arzheim		
- * Club domestic league appearances and goals

Mustafa Agić (born 8 April 1966) is a Bosnian former professional footballer who played as a forward.

== Career ==
Born in Brčko, SR Bosnia and Herzegovina, he started playing in local club FK Jedinstvo Brčko in Yugoslav Second League. He debuted in the season 1985–86 and in the winter-break of the 1987–88 season he was brought by Croatian giants NK Dinamo Zagreb. He played with Dinamo in the Yugoslav First League in the second half of the 1987–88 and in the 1988–89 seasons. He made a total of 30 official appearances for Dinamo (24 in the league, 3 in Yugoslav Cup and 3 in European competitions, having scored 3 goals, all of them in the league). In 1989–90 he was still a Dinamo player but he played no games as he was an army conscript that year. In summer 1990 he was brought by Serbian side FK Spartak Subotica and played with Spartak in the Yugoslav First League in seasons 1990–91 (22 app., 0 goals) and 1991–92 (5 app., 1 goal).

After playing with Spartak he moved abroad, first he played in Greece with Kavala and PAOK, and then he moved to Germany where he played with 1. FC Schweinfurt 05, TuS Koblenz and later with FC Arzheim.
