= Ivan Cvjetković =

Croatian footballer

Personal information
- Date of birth: 2 January 1960 (age 66)
- Place of birth: Drenovci, FPR Yugoslavia
- Position: Forward

Senior career*
Years	Team	Apps	(Gls)
1982–1984	Sloboda Tuzla	62	(21)
1984–1986	Dinamo Zagreb	36	(8)
1985–1986	Rad	14	(5)
1986–1988	Dinamo Zagreb	39	(16)
1987–1991	Sint-Truiden	64	(17)
1991–1993	Inker Zaprešić	23	(9)
1992–1994	Segesta	15	(7)
1993–1994	Dinamo Zagreb	13	(5)
1994–1995	Hrvatski Dragovoljac		

International career
1990–1991	Croatia XI	3	(1)
- * Club domestic league appearances and goals

Ivan Cvjetković (born 2 January 1960) is a Croatian retired international footballer.

== Club career ==
Ivan started his career in the Yugoslav First League in 1982, playing in the Bosnian club Sloboda Tuzla. In 1984, he made a big move to the Croatian giants Dinamo Zagreb, where he will stay almost four seasons until January 1988, the only exception was the half season spend in Serbian club FK Rad. Then he moved abroad to Belgium to play in Sint-Truidense VV, where he will stay until January 1991. Then, he returned to Croatia, now already independent, and signed for Prva HNL club Inter Zaprešić. He also played for Segesta Sisak before returning, in January 1994, to Dinamo Zagreb, called in that period Croatia Zagreb. He finished his playing career in another Croatian club Hrvatski Dragovoljac.

== International career ==
Cvjetković made his debut for Croatia in an October 1990 friendly match against the United States and earned a total of 3 caps, scoring 1 goal. His final international was a June 1991 friendly away against Slovenia. Since Croatia was still officially part of Yugoslavia at the time, all games were unofficial.
