= Iñaki Alonso =

Spanish football manager

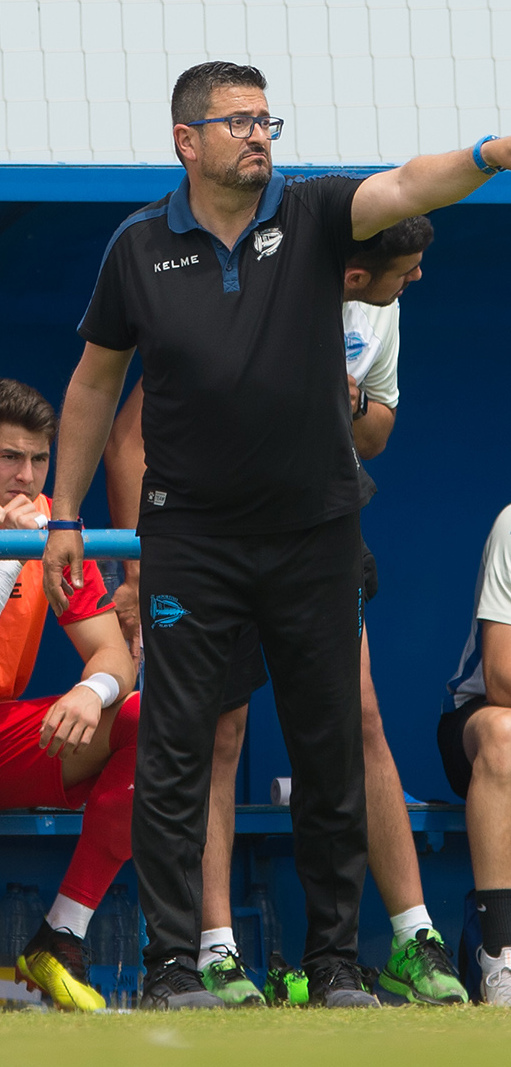

Personal information
- Full name: José Iñaki Alonso Rodríguez
- Date of birth: 7 August 1968 (age 58)
- Place of birth: Durango, Spain

Team information
- Current team: Santa Coloma (manager)

Managerial career
- Years: Team
- 2002–2003: Durango
- 2003–2004: Eibar B
- 2004–2007: Lemona
- 2007–2010: Real Unión
- 2010–2012: Murcia
- 2013–2014: Huracán
- 2014–2015: Compostela
- 2016: Lorca
- 2017: Rudeš
- 2018–2019: Alavés (youth)
- 2019–2021: Alavés B
- 2021–2022: Saprissa
- 2023: Gimnàstic
- 2023–2024: Badajoz
- 2025–: Santa Coloma

José Iñaki Alonso Rodríguez (born 7 August 1968) is a Spanish football manager, who is currently in charge of Andorran side UE Santa Coloma.

== Manager career ==
Born in Durango, Biscay, Basque Country, Alonso began his managerial career at local SCD Durango, and subsequently managed neighbours SD Eibar B, in Tercera División. In 2004, he was appointed SD Lemona manager, always achieving mid-table positions in his three-year spell.

On 19 July 2007 Alonso was appointed at the helm of Real Unión. In the 2008–09 campaign, after knocking out Real Madrid in Copa del Rey, he led the Txuri-beltz back to Segunda División after a 44-year absence.

On 17 July 2010, after suffering relegation back with Real Unión, Alonso joined Real Murcia. He renewed with the club on 21 June of the following year, after returning to the second level at first attempt.

On 19 June 2012, after being relegated, Alonso was sacked. On 7 July of the following year he was appointed Huracán Valencia CF manager.

On 16 June 2014 Alonso was appointed at SD Compostela in the third level, being relieved from his duties on 16 November 2015. On 4 July 2016 he was appointed at Lorca FC, but only lasted six matchdays.

On 10 June 2017, Alonso became the head coach of Croatian First Football League team NK Rudeš, but left in December and returned to his home country with Deportivo Alavés' Juvenil A squad the following 4 January. On 4 March 2019, he took over the B-team in the fourth tier, and led the side back to division three months later.

Alonso renewed his contract until 2021 on 12 July 2019, but left the Miniglorias on a mutual agreement on 5 February 2021. On 10 November, Alonso was named in charge of Costa Rican side Deportivo Saprissa, but was sacked on 7 April 2022.

Alonso returned to Spain on 17 January 2023, after being named in charge of Gimnàstic de Tarragona in Primera Federación. On 26 February, after one win in just six matches, he was dismissed.

== Managerial statistics ==
As of 10 December 2025

Managerial record by team and tenure
| Team | Nat | From | To | Record | | | | | | | | Ref |
| Team | Nat | From | To | G | W | D | L | GF | GA | GD | Win % | Ref |
|---|---|---|---|---|---|---|---|---|---|---|---|---|
| Durango | (Spain) | 2002 | 2003 | 38 | 9 | 17 | 12 | 34 | 40 | −6 | 23.68 | |
| Eibar B | (Spain) | 2003 | 30 June 2004 | 42 | 21 | 11 | 10 | 46 | 29 | +17 | 50.00 | |
| Lemona | (Spain) | 1 July 2004 | 19 July 2007 | 117 | 43 | 46 | 28 | 103 | 82 | +21 | 36.75 | |
| Real Unión | (Spain) | 19 July 2007 | 17 July 2010 | 136 | 58 | 36 | 42 | 170 | 140 | +30 | 42.65 | |
| Murcia | (Spain) | 17 July 2010 | 19 June 2012 | 90 | 40 | 21 | 29 | 124 | 98 | +26 | 44.44 | |
| Huracán | (Spain) | 7 July 2013 | 16 June 2014 | 39 | 14 | 10 | 15 | 42 | 41 | +1 | 35.90 | |
| Compostela | (Spain) | 16 June 2014 | 16 November 2015 | 52 | 19 | 14 | 19 | 52 | 57 | −5 | 36.54 | |
| Lorca | (Spain) | 4 July 2016 | 12 September 2016 | 6 | 2 | 2 | 2 | 9 | 11 | −2 | 33.33 | |
| Rudeš | (Croatia) | 10 June 2017 | 27 December 2017 | 24 | 4 | 7 | 13 | 25 | 48 | −23 | 16.67 | |
| Alavés B | (Spain) | 4 March 2019 | 5 February 2021 | 58 | 21 | 19 | 18 | 72 | 65 | +7 | 36.21 | |
| Saprissa | (Costa Rica) | 10 November 2021 | 7 April 2022 | 23 | 8 | 6 | 9 | 32 | 29 | +3 | 34.78 | |
| Gimnàstic | (Spain) | 17 January 2023 | 26 February 2023 | 6 | 1 | 2 | 3 | 3 | 10 | −7 | 16.67 | |
| Badajoz | (Spain) | 18 October 2023 | 3 March 2024 | 18 | 4 | 7 | 7 | 15 | 19 | −4 | 22.22 | |
| Santa Coloma | (Andorra) | 24 May 2025 | Present | 10 | 7 | 2 | 1 | 21 | 4 | +17 | 70.00 | |
| Total | | | | 659 | 251 | 200 | 208 | 748 | 673 | +75 | 38.09 | — |
