= 2026–27 NK Osijek season =

Osijek
2026–27 season
- Owner: NK OS d.o.o.
- President: Alexandra Végh
- Head coach: Tomislav Radotić (until 11 June 2026); Federico Bessone (since 23 June 2026)
- Stadium: Opus Arena
- HNL: 2nd
- Croatian Cup: First round

The 2026–27 NK Osijek season is the club's 80th season in existence and the 36th consecutive season in the top flight of Croatian football.

== Players ==
As of 19 September 2026

Note: Flags indicate national team as defined under FIFA eligibility rules; some limited exceptions apply. Players may hold more than one non-FIFA nationality.

No.	Pos.	Nation	Player
1	GK	CAN	Nikola Ćurčija
2	DF	GER	Marcel Heister
6	MF	COL	David Mejía
7	FW	CRO	Ivan Dolček
8	MF	CRO	Šimun Mikolčić
9	FW	CRO	Ivan Barić
10	MF	CRO	Jona Ježić
11	MF	CRO	Luka Tunjić
13	MF	CRO	Vito Čaić
16	MF	UKR	Oleksandr Petrusenko
18	MF	CRO	Niko Farkaš
20	GK	CRO	Jan Hlapčić
21	FW	ESP	Alejandro Cantero
22	DF	NED	Jay Kruiver
23	MF	CRO	Luka Vrbančić

No.	Pos.	Nation	Player
24	DF	CRO	Luka Posavec
26	DF	CRO	Luka Jelenić
30	FW	MKD	Admir Ljatifi
31	GK	CRO	Marko Malenica (captain)
33	DF	SWE	Emin Hasić
34	FW	CRO	Anton Matković
39	FW	CRO	Domagoj Bukvić
47	DF	CRO	David Kalem
49	DF	CRO	Ivano Kolarik
67	MF	HUN	Balázs Bakti
77	DF	BIH	Senad Mustafić
79	FW	MEX	Armando León
98	DF	CRO	Izak Ježić
99	FW	POR	Balelo

== Transfers ==
=== In ===
Pos	Player	Transferred from	Fee	Date	Source
DF	(Bosnia and Herzegovina) Senad Mustafić	(Austria) Sturm Graz II	Free	25 June 2026	
MF	(Hungary) Balázs Bakti	(Hungary) Zalaegerszeg	Undisclosed	25 June 2026	
DF	(Croatia) Luka Zebec	(Croatia) Čepin	Return from loan	30 June 2026	
FW	(Croatia) Marino Žeravica	(Hungary) Szentlőrinc	Return from loan	30 June 2026	
FW	(Croatia) Ivan Dolček	(Slovakia) DAC Dunajská Streda	Undisclosed	2 July 2026	
MF	(Croatia) Vito Čaić	(Croatia) Dinamo Zagreb	Undisclosed	9 July 2026	
FW	(Portugal) Balelo	(Portugal) Paredes	€75,000	16 July 2026	
FW	(Mexico) Armando León	(Andorra) Rànger's	Free	23 July 2026	
DF	(Germany) Marcel Heister	(Croatia) Istra 1961	Free	24 July 2026	
MF	(Hungary) Noel Keresztes	(Slovenia) Nafta 1903	Undisclosed	7 September 2026	
DF	(Netherlands) Jay Kruiver	(Netherlands) Roda JC	€100,000	8 September 2026	
MF	(Croatia) Luka Tunjić	No team	Free	14 September 2026	
FW	(Spain) Alejandro Cantero	No team	Free	14 September 2026	

=== Out ===
Pos	Player	Transferred to	Fee	Date	Source
DF	(Croatia) Borna Barišić	Free agent	End of contract	30 June 2026	
DF	(Croatia) David Čolina	(Germany) Augsburg	Return from loan	30 June 2026	
DF	(Brazil) Renan Guedes	Free agent	End of contract	30 June 2026	
DF	(Australia) Fran Karačić	(Croatia) Hajduk Split	Return from loan	30 June 2026	
DF	(Croatia) Luka Zebec	(Croatia) Čepin	End of contract	30 June 2026	
MF	(Nigeria) Samuel Akere	(Poland) Widzew Łódź	Return from loan	30 June 2026	
MF	(Montenegro) Vladan Bubanja	(Russia) Orenburg	Return from loan	30 June 2026	
MF	(Croatia) Tonio Teklić	(Poland) Widzew Łódź	Return from loan	30 June 2026	
FW	(Switzerland) Kemal Ademi	Free agent	End of contract	30 June 2026	
FW	(Croatia) Jakov Dedić	(Germany) Hoffenheim II	€850,000	6 July 2026	
MF	(Croatia) Andrej Mićić	(Slovenia) Nafta 1903	Loan	14 July 2026	
MF	(Croatia) Fran Peček	(Croatia) Orijent	Loan	21 July 2026	
GK	(Croatia) Matej Grahovac	(Croatia) Mladost Ždralovi	Loan	22 July 2026	
FW	(Croatia) Marino Žeravica	(Croatia) Mladost Ždralovi	Loan	22 July 2026	
DF	(Croatia) Krešimir Vrbanac	(Croatia) Vukovar 1991	Loan	6 August 2026	
MF	(Croatia) Miloš Jovičić	(Malta) Żabbar St. Patrick	Released	31 August 2026	
FW	(Austria) Arnel Jakupović	(Portugal) Vitória de Guimarães	€600,000	2 September 2026	
DF	(Croatia) Roko Jurišić	(Portugal) Estoril Praia	€500,000	4 September 2026	
MF	(Bosnia and Herzegovina) Nail Omerović	(Portugal) Estoril Praia	€1,500,000	4 September 2026	
MF	(Bulgaria) Stanislav Shopov	(Bulgaria) Botev Plovdiv	Loan	4 September 2026	
DF	(Albania) Jon Mersinaj	(Croatia) Slaven Belupo	Loan	5 September 2026	
MF	(Hungary) Noel Keresztes	(Slovenia) Nafta 1903	Loan	7 September 2026	
FW	(Switzerland) Yannick Toure	(Slovenia) Nafta 1903	Loan	7 September 2026	

▼ Total Spending: €175,000

▲ Total Income: €3,450,000

▲ Net Income: €3,275,000

== Competitions ==
=== Overall record ===
Competition	First match	Last match	Starting round	Final position	Record							
Competition	First match	Last match	Starting round	Final position	Pld	W	D	L	GF	GA	GD	Win %
SuperSport HNL	1 August 2026	May 2027	Matchday 1		13	6	2	5	22	18	+4	46.15
Croatian Cup	9 September 2026	9 September 2026	First round	First round	1	0	0	1	1	3	−2	0.00
Total					14	6	2	6	23	21	+2	42.86

Last updated: 9 November 2026
Source: Soccerway

=== SuperSport HNL ===
==== League table ====
Pos	Team	Pld	W	D	L	GF	GA	GD	Pts	Qualification or relegation (Note: The 2026–27 Croatian Football Cup winners qualify for the Europa League first qualifying round (or the second-placed team if the Croatian Cup winners finish first). If the Croatian Cup winners finish in the top three, the second Conference League second qualifying round spot will be passed to the fourth-placed team.)
1	Hajduk Split	13	9	2	2	27	11	+16	29	Qualification to Champions League second qualifying round
2	Dinamo Zagreb	12	8	1	3	28	15	+13	25	Qualification to Conference League second qualifying round
3	Osijek	13	6	2	5	22	18	+4	20	Qualification to Conference League second qualifying round
4	Istra 1961	13	5	4	4	24	19	+5	19	
5	Varaždin	13	5	4	4	17	14	+3	19	

Updated to match(es) played on 8 November 2026. Source: SuperSport HNL
Rules for classification: 1) Points; 2) Head-to-head points; 3) Head-to-head goal difference; 4) Head-to-head goals scored (at home if two teams tied); 5) Goal difference; 6) Goals scored; 7) Play-off
(Note: Criteria 2-4 and 7 is only used if deciding champion, teams to international competition or teams for relegation and in that case criteria 6 will not be used).

==== Results summary ====
Overall								Home						Away					
Pld	W	D	L	GF	GA	GD	Pts	W	D	L	GF	GA	GD	W	D	L	GF	GA	GD
13	6	2	5	22	18	+4	20	3	1	3	10	8	+2	3	1	2	12	10	+2

Last updated: 9 November 2026.
Source: SuperSport HNL

==== Results by round ====
Round	1	2	3	4	5	6	7	8	9	10	11	12	13	14
Ground	A	A	H	A	H	A	H	A	H	H	H	A	H	
Result	W	W	W	L	W	L	W	D	L	D	L	W	L	
Position	2	1		2							5			

Updated to match(es) played on 8 November 2026. Source: SuperSport HNL
A = Away; H = Home; W = Win; D = Draw; L = Loss

==== Matches ====
1 August 2026 1	Gorica	0–2	Osijek	Velika Gorica
21:00 CEST (UTC+02:00)	Perić (yellow card) 13'	Report	Dolček 8'; Omerović 14' (pen.); Mikolčić (yellow card) 66'; Mustafić (yellow card) 86'	Stadium: Stadion Radnik; Attendance: 1,012; Referee: Ivan Vukančić

8 August 2026 2	Rudeš	1–6	Osijek	Velika Gorica
18:30 CEST (UTC+02:00)	Ilečić 84'	Report	León 12', 28'; Omerović 41', 44', 81'; Bukvić (yellow card) 45+2'; Jakupović 69'; Hasić (yellow card) 83'	Stadium: Stadion Radnik; Attendance: 570; Referee: Marko Crnojević

15 August 2026 3	Osijek	1–0	Lokomotiva	Osijek
21:00 CEST (UTC+02:00)	Jakupović (yellow card) 75' (goal) 90'; León (yellow card) 80'; Kolarik (yellow card) 82'	Report	Jukić (yellow card) 69'; Lorber (yellow card) 85'; Pajač (red card) 90+3'	Stadium: Opus Arena; Attendance: 5,276; Referee: Ante Terzić

23 August 2026 4	Hajduk Split	4–0	Osijek	Split
21:00 CEST (UTC+02:00)	Brruti 9'; Livaja 54' (yellow card) 58'; Hodak (yellow card) 62'; Dalisson (yellow card) 79'; Sanyang 83'; Hrgović 90'	Report	Mustafić (red card) 32'; Petrusenko (yellow card) 53'	Stadium: Stadion Poljud; Attendance: 14,976; Referee: Patrik Kolarić

30 August 2026 5	Osijek	3–0	Slaven Belupo	Osijek
20:00 CEST (UTC+02:00)	J. Ježić 11' 52'; Omerović 38'	Report	Adeshina (yellow card) 79'	Stadium: Opus Arena; Attendance: 3,652; Referee: Igor Pajač

5 September 2026 6	Rijeka	4–1	Osijek	Rijeka
21:00 CEST (UTC+02:00)	Vignato 21'; Adu-Adjei 33', 43'; Fruk 61'	Report	J. Ježić (yellow card) 12'; León 15'; Bukvić (yellow card) 45+1'	Stadium: Stadion Rujevica; Attendance: 4,506; Referee: Mateo Erceg

12 September 2026 7	Osijek	4–2	Dinamo Zagreb	Osijek
17:00 CEST (UTC+02:00)	Bukvić (yellow card) 3' (goal) 90+4'; León 12', 35'; Kruiver (yellow card) 23'; J. Ježić (yellow card) 51'; Vrbančić 60'; Jelenić (yellow card) 78'	Report	Stojković (yellow card) 23'; Zajc 62'; Pérez Vinlöf (yellow card) 73'; Topić (yellow card) 79'; Prevljak 90+3' (pen.)	Stadium: Opus Arena; Attendance: 7,708; Referee: Ante Terzić

19 September 2026 8	Varaždin	0–0	Osijek	Varaždin
17:00 CEST (UTC+02:00)	Sikošek (yellow card) 28'	Report	Kruiver (yellow card) 11'; Heister (yellow card) 35'; Farkaš (yellow card) 67'	Stadium: Stadion Varteks; Attendance: 2,304; Referee: Ante Čulina

10 October 2026 9	Osijek	1–3	Istra 1961	Osijek
18:00 CEST (UTC+02:00)	Mikolčić 2' (yellow card) 69'; León (yellow card) 77'	Report	Maurić 34'; Škafar Žužić 50'; Hodžić (yellow card) 67'; Albarracín (yellow card) 71'; Ahmeti 90+3' (yellow card) 90+6'	Stadium: Opus Arena; Attendance: 6,012; Referee: Ivan Vukančić

17 October 2026 10	Osijek	1–1	Gorica	Osijek
18:00 CEST (UTC+02:00)	I. Ježić (yellow card) 31'; León (yellow card) 35'; Perić 68' (o.g.)	Report	Pranjić 24'; Frigan (yellow card) 35'; Costa (yellow card) 60'; Braut (yellow card) 90+2'	Stadium: Opus Arena; Attendance: 3,050; Referee: Ante Čulina

25 October 2026 11	Osijek	0–1	Rudeš	Osijek
18:00 CET (UTC+01:00)		Report	El Haddad (yellow card) 27'; Bralić (yellow card) 57'; Đorić (yellow card) 75'; Saho 81'; Taraba (yellow card) 87'	Stadium: Opus Arena; Attendance: 3,012; Referee: Mateo Erceg

1 November 2026 12	Lokomotiva	1–3	Osijek	Zagreb
18:00 CET (UTC+01:00)	Fetai (yellow card) 58'; Marić 60'; Vešović (yellow card) 90+4'	Report	Tunjić 7'; Kalem (yellow card) 21'; Farkaš 36' (yellow card) 85'; Cantero (yellow card) 38'; Jelenić (yellow card) 58'; Balelo 90+4'	Stadium: Stadion Maksimir; Attendance: 118; Referee: Marko Crnojević

8 November 2026 13	Osijek	0–1	Hajduk Split	Osijek
15:00 CET (UTC+01:00)	León (yellow card) 12'; Jelenić (yellow card) 19'; Petrusenko (yellow card) 27'; Kruiver (yellow card) 77'	Report	Fayad (yellow card) 54'; Martín 90' (yellow card) 90'; Acapandié (yellow card) 90+4'	Stadium: Opus Arena; Attendance: 8,746; Referee: Ante Čulina

=== Croatian Cup ===
9 September 2026 First round	Segesta	3–1	Osijek	Sisak
16:30 CEST (UTC+02:00)	Kukoč 41' (yellow card) 42'; Brlek 45+1'; Gec 90+3' (yellow card) 90+3'	Report	Mikolčić (yellow card) 44'; Farkaš 54'; León (yellow card) 85'; Jelenić (yellow card) 90'	Stadium: Gradski stadion Attendance: 1,300; Referee: Patrik Kolarić

=== Friendlies ===
==== Pre-season ====
4 July 2026 Friendly	Osijek (Croatia)	0–4	(Hungary) Paks	Osijek, Croatia
19:00 CEST (UTC+02:00)		Report	Lapu 44'; Tóth 78', 88'; Debreceni 86'	Stadium: Opus Arena; Attendance: 0

13 July 2026 Friendly	Neftçi (Azerbaijan)	0–1	(Croatia) Osijek	Lendava, Slovenia
17:30 CEST (UTC+02:00)		Report	Ljatifi 74'	Stadium: Lendava Sports Park

18 July 2026 Friendly	Osijek (Croatia)	2–1	(Hungary) Kispest Honvéd	Osijek, Croatia
19:00 CEST (UTC+02:00)	Omerović 2'; Dolček 29'	Report	Szamosi 63'	Stadium: Opus Arena

22 July 2026 Friendly	Osijek	3–0	Cibalia	Osijek
19:00 CEST (UTC+02:00)	Balelo 9' (pen.); Barić 54'; Omerović 66'	Report		Stadium: Opus Arena; Attendance: 0

25 July 2026 Friendly	Osijek (Croatia)	1–3	(Turkey) Rizespor	Radomlje, Slovenia
18:00 CEST (UTC+02:00)	León 76'	Report	Varešanović 45+4'; Laçi 47' (pen.); Tosun 62'	Stadium: Sports park Radomlje

==== On-season (2026) ====
3 October 2026 Friendly	Osijek	1–1	BSK Bijelo Brdo	Osijek
11:00 CEST (UTC+02:00)	León 89'	Report	Rétyi 78'	Stadium: Opus Arena

== Player seasonal records ==
Updated 11 September 2026

=== Goals ===
Rank	Name	League	Cup	Total
1	(Bosnia and Herzegovina) Nail Omerović	5	–	5
2	(Austria) Arnel Jakupović	2	–	2
3	(Croatia) Niko Farkaš	–	1	1
Own goals		1	–	2
TOTALS		8	1	9

Source: Competitive matches

=== Clean sheets ===
Rank	Name	League	Cup	Total
1	(Croatia) Marko Malenica	–	–	0
TOTALS		0	0	0

Source: Competitive matches

=== Disciplinary record ===
Number	Position	Player	HNL			Croatian Cup			Total		
Number	Position	Player	Yellow card	(yellow card) (yellow-red card)	Red card	Yellow card	(yellow card) (yellow-red card)	Red card	Yellow card	(yellow card) (yellow-red card)	Red card
2	DF	(Germany) Marcel Heister	1	0	0	0	0	0	1	0	0
8	MF	(Croatia) Šimun Mikolčić	0	0	0	1	0	0	1	0	0
10	MF	(Croatia) Jona Ježić	0	0	0	0	0	0	0	0	0
16	MF	(Ukraine) Oleksandr Petrusenko	0	0	0	0	0	0	0	0	0
17	FW	(Austria) Arnel Jakupović	1	0	0	0	0	0	1	0	0
18	MF	(Croatia) Niko Farkaš	1	0	0	0	0	0	1	0	0
21	FW	(Spain) Alejandro Cantero	0	0	0	0	0	0	0	0	0
22	DF	(Netherlands) Jay Kruiver	1	0	0	0	0	0	1	0	0
26	DF	(Croatia) Luka Jelenić	0	0	0	1	0	0	1	0	0
33	DF	(Sweden) Emin Hasić	0	0	0	0	0	0	0	0	0
39	FW	(Croatia) Domagoj Bukvić	0	0	0	0	0	0	0	0	0
47	DF	(Croatia) David Kalem	0	0	0	0	0	0	0	0	0
49	DF	(Croatia) Ivano Kolarik	0	0	0	0	0	0	0	0	0
77	DF	(Bosnia and Herzegovina) Senad Mustafić	0	0	0	0	0	0	0	0	0
79	FW	(Mexico) Armando León	0	0	0	1	0	0	1	0	0
98	DF	(Croatia) Izak Ježić	0	0	0	0	0	0	0	0	0
TOTALS			1	0	0	3	0	0	4	0	0

=== Appearances and goals ===
Number	Position	Player	Apps	Goals	Apps	Goals	Apps	Goals
Number	Position	Player	Total		HNL (Note: First number represents appearances in starting eleven, while the second number indicates a substitute appearance.)		Croatian Cup	
1	GK	(Canada) Nikola Ćurčija	1	0	0+0	0	1+0	0
2	DF	(Germany) Marcel Heister	1	0	0+0	0	1+0	0
7	FW	(Croatia) Ivan Dolček	0	0	0+0	0	0+0	0
8	MF	(Croatia) Šimun Mikolčić	1	0	0+0	0	0+1	0
9	FW	(Croatia) Ivan Barić	1	0	0+0	0	1+0	0
10	MF	(Croatia) Jona Ježić	0	0	0+0	0	0+0	0
11	MF	(Bosnia and Herzegovina) Nail Omerović	5	5	5+0	5	0+0	0
11	MF	(Croatia) Luka Tunjić	0	0	0+0	0	0+0	0
13	MF	(Croatia) Vito Čaić	1	0	0+0	0	1+0	0
16	MF	(Ukraine) Oleksandr Petrusenko	1	0	0+0	0	1+0	0
17	FW	(Austria) Arnel Jakupović	4	2	1+3	2	0+0	0
18	MF	(Croatia) Niko Farkaš	1	1	0+0	0	1+0	1
21	FW	(Spain) Alejandro Cantero	0	0	0+0	0	0+0	0
22	DF	(Croatia) Roko Jurišić	5	0	5+0	0	0+0	0
22	DF	(Netherlands) Jay Kruiver	1	0	1+0	0	0+0	0
23	MF	(Croatia) Luka Vrbančić	0	0	0+0	0	0+0	0
24	DF	(Croatia) Luka Posavec	1	0	0+0	0	1+0	0
26	DF	(Croatia) Luka Jelenić	1	0	0+0	0	0+1	0
30	FW	(North Macedonia) Admir Ljatifi	1	0	0+0	0	0+1	0
31	GK	(Croatia) Marko Malenica	0	0	0+0	0	0+0	0
33	DF	(Sweden) Emin Hasić	0	0	0+0	0	0+0	0
39	FW	(Croatia) Domagoj Bukvić	1	0	0+0	0	1+0	0
47	DF	(Croatia) David Kalem	0	0	0+0	0	0+0	0
49	DF	(Croatia) Ivano Kolarik	1	0	0+0	0	1+0	0
67	MF	(Hungary) Balázs Bakti	1	0	0+0	0	1+0	0
77	DF	(Bosnia and Herzegovina) Senad Mustafić	0	0	0+0	0	0+0	0
79	FW	(Mexico) Armando León	1	0	0+0	0	0+1	0
98	DF	(Croatia) Izak Ježić	1	0	0+0	0	0+1	0
99	FW	(Portugal) Balelo	1	0	0+0	0	1+0	0
