= 2025–26 NK Osijek season =

Osijek
2025–26 season
- Owner: NK OS d.o.o.
- President: Ferenc Szakály (until 20 February 2026); Alexandra Végh (since 20 February 2026)
- Head coach: Simon Rožman (until 29 October 2025); Željko Sopić (29 October 2025 - 23 February 2026); Tomislav Radotić (since 24 February 2026)
- Stadium: Opus Arena
- HNL: 9th
- Croatian Cup: Second Round
- Top goalscorer: League: Nail Omerović (8); All: Nail Omerović (8)
- Highest home attendance: 11,502 v Dinamo Zagreb (2 August 2025)
- Lowest home attendance: 1,572 v Slaven Belupo (22 May 2026)
- Average home league attendance: 4,815

The 2025–26 NK Osijek season was the club's 79th season in existence and the 35th consecutive season in the top flight of Croatian football.

== Players ==
As of 10 February 2026

Note: Flags indicate national team as defined under FIFA eligibility rules; some limited exceptions apply. Players may hold more than one non-FIFA nationality.

No.	Pos.	Nation	Player
1	GK	CAN	Nikola Ćurčija
3	DF	CRO	Borna Barišić (captain)
5	DF	ALB	Jon Mersinaj
6	MF	COL	David Mejía
8	MF	CRO	Šimun Mikolčić
9	FW	SUI	Yannick Toure
10	MF	BUL	Stanislav Shopov
11	MF	BIH	Nail Omerović
16	MF	UKR	Oleksandr Petrusenko
17	FW	AUT	Arnel Jakupović
18	MF	CRO	Niko Farkaš
21	MF	MNE	Vladan Bubanja (on loan from Orenburg)
22	DF	CRO	Roko Jurišić

No.	Pos.	Nation	Player
23	MF	CRO	Luka Vrbančić
26	DF	CRO	Luka Jelenić
29	DF	AUS	Fran Karačić (on loan from Hajduk Split)
31	GK	CRO	Marko Malenica (vice-captain)
33	DF	SWE	Emin Hasić
34	FW	CRO	Anton Matković
38	DF	CRO	David Čolina (on loan from Augsburg)
39	FW	CRO	Domagoj Bukvić
42	DF	BRA	Renan Guedes
46	FW	CRO	Ivan Barić
49	DF	CRO	Ivano Kolarik
57	FW	NGR	Samuel Akere (on loan from Widzew Łódź)
99	MF	CRO	Tonio Teklić (on loan from Widzew Łódź)

== Transfers ==
=== In ===
Pos	Player	Transferred from	Fee	Date	Source
MF	(Bulgaria) Stanislav Shopov	(Bulgaria) CSKA Sofia	Free	2 June 2025	
FW	(Croatia) Marino Žeravica	(Croatia) Hajduk Split	Free	16 June 2025	
MF	(Croatia) Luka Vrbančić	(Croatia) Dinamo Zagreb	€250,000	26 June 2025	
FW	(Switzerland) Yannick Toure	(Switzerland) Aarau	Undisclosed	27 June 2025	
DF	(Croatia) Krešimir Vrbanac	(Croatia) BSK Bijelo Brdo	Return from loan	29 June 2025	
FW	(Croatia) Luka Branšteter	(Croatia) Cibalia	Return from loan	29 June 2025	
DF	(Croatia) Luka Zebec	(Croatia) BSK Bijelo Brdo	Return from loan	30 June 2025	
MF	(Croatia) Hrvoje Babec	(Latvia) Riga	€300,000	1 July 2025	
GK	(Canada) Nikola Ćurčija	(Croatia) Jarun	Undisclosed	3 July 2025	
DF	(Croatia) David Čolina	(Germany) Augsburg	Loan	26 July 2025	
MF	(Ukraine) Oleksandr Petrusenko	(Turkey) Antalyaspor	Free	26 July 2025	
MF	(Croatia) Miloš Jovičić	(Serbia) TSC	Undisclosed	28 August 2025	
DF	(Croatia) Borna Barišić	No team	Free	22 December 2025	
MF	(Croatia) Tonio Teklić	(Poland) Widzew Łódź	Loan	3 January 2026	
MF	(Nigeria) Samuel Akere	(Poland) Widzew Łódź	Loan	5 January 2026	
MF	(Montenegro) Vladan Bubanja	(Russia) Orenburg	Loan	9 January 2026	
DF	(Australia) Fran Karačić	(Croatia) Hajduk Split	Loan	10 January 2026	
MF	(Colombia) David Mejía	(Croatia) Vukovar 1991	Undisclosed	14 January 2026	
DF	(Croatia) Luka Zebec	Đakovo Croatia	Recalled from loan	6 February 2026	
FW	(Nigeria) Justice Ohajunwa	(Moldova) Milsami Orhei	Return from loan	17 February 2026	

=== Out ===
Pos	Player	Transferred to	Fee	Date	Source
GK	(Italy) Mattia Del Favero	Free agent	End of contract	27 May 2025	
DF	(Italy) Alessandro Tuia	Free agent	End of contract	27 May 2025	
MF	(Portugal) Tiago Dantas	(Croatia) Rijeka	End of contract	27 May 2025	
MF	(Brazil) Pedro Lima	(Brazil) Palmeiras	Return from loan	27 May 2025	
MF	(Switzerland) Petar Pušić	Free agent	End of contract	27 May 2025	
FW	(Portugal) Hernâni Fortes	Free agent	End of contract	27 May 2025	
MF	(Croatia) Marko Soldo	(Croatia) Dinamo Zagreb	€1,000,000	12 June 2025	
MF	(Croatia) Hrvoje Babec	(Latvia) Riga	Return from loan	30 June 2025	
FW	(Croatia) Luka Branšteter	(Croatia) Graničar Županja	End of contract	10 July 2025	
DF	(Croatia) Luka Zebec	Đakovo Croatia	Loan	22 August 2025	
FW	(Nigeria) Justice Ohajunwa	(Moldova) Milsami Orhei	Loan	2 September 2025	
GK	(Croatia) Jan Hlapčić	Đakovo Croatia	Dual registration	5 September 2025	
DF	(Croatia) Krešimir Vrbanac	(Croatia) BSK Bijelo Brdo	Dual registration	5 September 2025	
MF	(Croatia) Miloš Jovičić	Đakovo Croatia	Dual registration	5 September 2025	
FW	(Croatia) Marino Žeravica	(Croatia) Dugopolje	Dual registration	5 September 2025	
DF	(Croatia) Ivan Cvijanović	(Portugal) Vizela	Released	2 January 2026	
MF	(Croatia) Hrvoje Babec	(South Korea) FC Seoul	€350,000	9 January 2026	
MF	(Croatia) Vedran Jugović		Retired	22 January 2026	
DF	(Armenia) Styopa Mkrtchyan	(Germany) 1. FC Nürnberg	€800,000	2 February 2026	
DF	(Croatia) Luka Zebec	(Croatia) Čepin	Loan	6 February 2026	
MF	(Croatia) Fran Peček	(Croatia) BSK Bijelo Brdo	Dual registration	10 February 2026	
FW	(Croatia) Marino Žeravica	(Hungary) Szentlőrinc	Loan	10 February 2026	
FW	(Croatia) Filip Živković	(Bosnia and Herzegovina) Sarajevo	Loan	12 February 2026	
GK	(Croatia) Matej Grahovac	(Croatia) Vardarac	Dual registration	16 February 2026	
GK	(Croatia) Jan Hlapčić	(Croatia) Vardarac	Dual registration	16 February 2026	

▼ Total Spending: €550,000

▲ Total Income: €2,150,000

▲ Net Income: €1,600,000

== Competitions ==
=== Overall record ===
Competition	First match	Last match	Starting round	Final position	Record							
Competition	First match	Last match	Starting round	Final position	Pld	W	D	L	GF	GA	GD	Win %
SuperSport HNL	2 August 2025	22 May 2026	Matchday 1	9th	36	8	11	17	27	49	−22	22.22
Croatian Cup	24 September 2025	3 December 2025	First round	Second round	2	1	1	0	5	1	+4	50.00
Total					38	9	12	17	32	50	−18	23.68

Last updated: 23 May 2026
Source: Soccerway

=== SuperSport HNL ===
==== League table ====
Pos	Team	Pld	W	D	L	GF	GA	GD	Pts	Qualification or relegation
6	Istra 1961	36	12	7	17	39	50	−11	43	
7	Gorica	36	11	8	17	40	48	−8	41	
8	Slaven Belupo	36	10	11	15	46	61	−15	41	
9	Osijek	36	8	11	17	27	49	−22	35	
10	Vukovar 1991 (R)	36	6	10	20	37	73	−36	28	Relegation to First Football League

Source: SuperSport HNL
Rules for classification: 1) Points; 2) Head-to-head points; 3) Head-to-head goal difference; 4) Head-to-head goals scored (at home if two teams tied); 5) Goal difference; 6) Goals scored; 7) Play-off
(Note: Criteria 2-4 and 7 is only used if deciding champion, teams to international competition or teams for relegation and in that case criteria 6 will not be used).
(R) Relegated

==== Results summary ====
Overall								Home						Away					
Pld	W	D	L	GF	GA	GD	Pts	W	D	L	GF	GA	GD	W	D	L	GF	GA	GD
36	8	11	17	27	49	−22	35	4	7	7	12	19	−7	4	4	10	15	30	−15

Last updated: 23 May 2026.
Source: SuperSport HNL

==== Results by round ====
Round	1	2	3	4	5	6	7	8	9	10	11	12	13	14	15	16	17	18	19	20	21	22	23	24	25	26	27	28	29	30	31	32	33	34	35	36
Ground	H	H	A	H	A	H	A	A	A	A	A	H	A	H	A	H	H	H	H	H	A	H	A	H	A	H	A	A	A	H	A	H	A	H	A	H
Result	L	D	D	L	D	W	L	W	L	L	L	D	L	D	D	L	D	D	L	W	L	L	L	W	W	D	D	L	W	L	W	D	L	L	L	W
Position	9	9	9	10	9	7	8	6	9	9	9	9	10	9	9	9	10	10	10	9	10	10	10	9	9	9	9	9	9	9	9	9	9	9	9	9

Updated to match(es) played on 23 May 2026. Source: SuperSport HNL
A = Away; H = Home; W = Win; D = Draw; L = Loss

==== Matches ====
2 August 2025 1	Osijek	0–2	Dinamo Zagreb	Osijek
21:00 CEST (UTC+02:00)	Babec (yellow card) 38'	Report	McKenna (yellow card) 58'; Kulenović 78'; Stojković 85'	Stadium: Opus Arena; Attendance: 11,502; Referee: Mateo Erceg

9 August 2025 2	Osijek	0–0	Rijeka	Osijek
21:00 CEST (UTC+02:00)	Shopov (yellow card) 54'; Vrbančić (yellow card) 85'; Guedes (yellow card) 86'	Report	Ilinković (yellow card) 18'; Menalo (yellow card) 56'; Petrovič (red card) 81'; Dantas (yellow card) 89'; Lasickas (yellow card) 89'	Stadium: Opus Arena; Attendance: 6,132; Referee: Ante Čulina

17 August 2025 3	Varaždin	0–0	Osijek	Varaždin
18:45 CEST (UTC+02:00)	Mladenovski (yellow card) 37'; Belcar (yellow card) 40'; Škaričić (yellow card) 54'; Tepšić (yellow card) 85'	Report	Farkaš (yellow card) 71'; Omerović (yellow card) 83'	Stadium: Stadion Varteks; Attendance: 2,197; Referee: Igor Pajač

24 August 2025 4	Osijek	0–2	Hajduk Split	Osijek
18:30 CEST (UTC+02:00)		Report	Livaja 11' (yellow card) 63'; Šego 66'; Ivušić (yellow card) 87'; Pajaziti (yellow card) 90'	Stadium: Opus Arena; Attendance: 11,383; Referee: Patrik Pavlešić

1 September 2025 5	Lokomotiva	1–1	Osijek	Zagreb
17:30 CEST (UTC+02:00)	Boune (yellow card) 58'; Katić (yellow card) 64'; Diop 66'	Report	Omerović 33'	Stadium: Stadion Maksimir; Attendance: 561; Referee: Ivan Vukančić

14 September 2025 6	Osijek	4–0	Vukovar 1991	Osijek
17:00 CEST (UTC+02:00)	Bukvić (yellow card) 22'; Jelenić 32'; Omerović 45+5', 73', 87'	Report	Tadić (yellow card) 50'; Puljić (yellow card) 58'; González (yellow card) 65'; Tormin (yellow card) 90+1'	Stadium: Opus Arena; Attendance: 4,342; Referee: Ante Čulina

21 September 2025 7	Istra 1961	2–1	Osijek	Pula
19:15 CEST (UTC+02:00)	Maurić 65'; Bangura 81'	Report	Omerović 39'	Stadium: Stadion Aldo Drosina; Attendance: 2,519; Referee: Patrik Kolarić

28 September 2025 8	Gorica	0–1	Osijek	Velika Gorica
16:00 CEST (UTC+02:00)	Kavelj (yellow card) 45+3'; Čabraja (yellow card) 59'; Erceg (yellow card) 66' (yellow-red card) 77'; Duraković (yellow card) 85'	Report	Petrusenko (yellow card) 13'; Jakupović 35'; Shopov (yellow card) 45+5'; Vrbančić (yellow card) 83' (yellow-red card) 90+5'	Stadium: Stadion Radnik; Attendance: 1,427; Referee: Duje Strukan

4 October 2025 9	Slaven Belupo	2–1	Osijek	Koprivnica
16:00 CEST (UTC+02:00)	Agbekpornu 7'; Šuto 59' (yellow card) 81'; Nestorovski (yellow card) 69' (yellow-red card) 71'; Caimacov (yellow card) 90+13'	Report	Shopov (yellow card) 47'; Jurišić (yellow card) 49'; Cvijanović (yellow card) 58'; Jakupović (yellow card) 65'; Mkrtchyan (yellow card) 70'; Jelenić 90+3'	Stadium: Gradski stadion Attendance: 1,614; Referee: Ante Čulina

18 October 2025 10	Dinamo Zagreb	2–1	Osijek	Zagreb
18:00 CEST (UTC+02:00)	McKenna 3'; Domínguez 14' (yellow card) 34'; Kulenović (yellow card) 59'	Report	Bukvić (yellow card) 65'; Mikolčić 70'	Stadium: Stadion Maksimir; Attendance: 13,836; Referee: Mateo Erceg

27 October 2025 11	Rijeka	4–2	Osijek	Rijeka
16:30 CET (UTC+01:00)	Fruk 10'; Čop 38', 47'; Majstorović (yellow card) 41'; Devetak 54'	Report	Mikolčić 2' (yellow card) 26'; Hasić (yellow card) 57' (yellow-red card) 75'; Jelenić (yellow card) 65'; Farkaš 74'; Petrusenko (yellow card) 90+2'	Stadium: Stadion Rujevica; Attendance: 5,096; Referee: Ante Čulina

2 November 2025 12	Osijek	0–0	Varaždin	Osijek
18:15 CET (UTC+01:00)	Guedes (yellow card) 26'; Mkrtchyan (yellow card) 38'	Report	Mamut (yellow card) 38'	Stadium: Opus Arena; Attendance: 4,364; Referee: Patrik Kolarić

8 November 2025 13	Hajduk Split	2–0	Osijek	Split
17:45 CET (UTC+01:00)	Krovinović 5'; Rebić (yellow card) 61'; Šego 90+4'	Report	Jurišić (yellow card) 45' (yellow-red card) 65'; Jakupović (yellow card) 74'; Jelenić (yellow card) 90+6'	Stadium: Stadion Poljud; Attendance: 22,564; Referee: Patrik Pavlešić

23 November 2025 14	Osijek	1–1	Lokomotiva	Osijek
16:00 CET (UTC+01:00)	Petrusenko (yellow card) 4' (yellow-red card) 28'; Omerović (yellow card) 45+3'; Jelenić 76'; Babec (yellow card) 90+3'	Report	Pajač (yellow card) 28' (goal) 43' (pen.)	Stadium: Opus Arena; Attendance: 2,742; Referee: Ivan Vukančić

28 November 2025 15	Vukovar 1991	2–2	Osijek	Vinkovci
18:00 CET (UTC+01:00)	Jurilj 53', 81'	Report	Jelenić (yellow card) 25'; Jakupović 35', 56'; Jurišić (yellow card) 70'	Stadium: Stadion HNK Cibalia; Attendance: 1,100; Referee: Antonio Melnjak

7 December 2025 16	Osijek	1–5	Istra 1961	Osijek
17:30 CET (UTC+01:00)	Guedes (yellow card) 29'; Babec 59'; Mersinaj (yellow card) 77'	Report	Heister (yellow card) 10'; Prevljak 17', 27', 44'; Frederiksen 49'; Lawal 73'; Djuric (yellow card) 84'	Stadium: Opus Arena; Attendance: 2,734; Referee: Igor Pajač

13 December 2025 17	Osijek	1–1	Gorica	Osijek
15:00 CET (UTC+01:00)	Čolina (yellow card) 41'; Mikolčić (yellow card) 54'; Matković 81'; Mkrtchyan (yellow card) 89'	Report	Filipović 22'; Pavičić (yellow card) 31'; Perić (red card) 56'	Stadium: Opus Arena; Attendance: 2,042; Referee: Patrik Pavlešić

20 December 2025 18	Osijek	0–0	Slaven Belupo	Osijek
15:00 CET (UTC+01:00)	Mersinaj (yellow card) 40'; Hasić (yellow card) 51'; Mikolčić (yellow card) 89'	Report	Nestorovski (yellow card) 40'	Stadium: Opus Arena; Attendance: 2,026; Referee: Duje Strukan

25 January 2026 19	Osijek	0–3	Dinamo Zagreb	Osijek
17:45 CET (UTC+01:00)	Mersinaj (yellow card) 83'	Report	Stojković 30'; Mišić (yellow card) 33'; Zajc 42'; Galešić (yellow card) 54'; Beljo 89'	Stadium: Opus Arena; Attendance: 8,723; Referee: Patrik Kolarić

1 February 2026 20	Osijek	1–0	Rijeka	Osijek
15:00 CET (UTC+01:00)	Akere 27'; Hasić (yellow card) 32'; Jelenić (yellow card) 70'; Matković (yellow card) 85'; Petrusenko (yellow card) 90+1'	Report	Radeljić (yellow card) 45+1'	Stadium: Opus Arena; Attendance: 3,262; Referee: Igor Pajač

8 February 2026 21	Varaždin	2–1	Osijek	Varaždin
15:00 CET (UTC+01:00)	Vuk 10'; Škaričić (yellow card) 17'; Mamut 63'; Ilinković (yellow card) 77'; Punčec (yellow card) 81'; Bočkaj (yellow card) 90+1'	Report	Bubanja (yellow card) 7' (goal) 19'; Hasić (yellow card) 32'; Akere (yellow card) 52'; Omerović (yellow card) 61'	Stadium: Stadion Varteks; Attendance: 1,547; Referee: Mateo Erceg

15 February 2026 22	Osijek	0–2	Hajduk Split	Osijek
17:45 CET (UTC+01:00)	Bubanja (yellow card) 45+1'; Jelenić (yellow card) 73'; Omerović (yellow card) 90+3'	Report	Livaja 15' (pen.); Šarlija (yellow card) 33'; Rebić (yellow card) 40'; Pukštas 77'	Stadium: Opus Arena; Attendance: 7,248; Referee: Ante Čulina

21 February 2026 23	Lokomotiva	3–1	Osijek	Zagreb
17:15 CET (UTC+01:00)	Pajač 51' (pen.); Stojaković 66'; Trajkovski 83'	Report	Karačić 45'	Stadium: Stadion Maksimir; Attendance: 317; Referee: Ante Terzić

28 February 2026 24	Osijek	2–0	Vukovar 1991	Osijek
15:00 CET (UTC+01:00)	Jakupović 57' (pen.); Mejía (yellow card) 60'; Karačić (yellow card) 68'; Bubanja (yellow card) 77'; Hasić (yellow card) 90+3'; Akere 90+5'	Report	Gurlica (yellow card) 79'; González (yellow card) 87'	Stadium: Opus Arena; Attendance: 5,682; Referee: Patrik Kolarić

6 March 2026 25	Istra 1961	0–1	Osijek	Pula
18:00 CET (UTC+01:00)	Rozić (yellow card) 72'; Kadušić (yellow card) 79'	Report	Bubanja (yellow card) 32'; Mikolčić (yellow card) 43'; Kolarik (yellow card) 54'; Omerović 61'; Mejía (yellow card) 77'	Stadium: Stadion Aldo Drosina; Attendance: 1,457; Referee: Duje Strukan

14 March 2026 26	Osijek	0–0	Gorica	Osijek
15:00 CET (UTC+01:00)	Mejía (yellow card) 45'	Report		Stadium: Opus Arena; Attendance: 4,024; Referee: Ante Čulina

22 March 2026 27	Slaven Belupo	0–0	Osijek	Koprivnica
15:00 CET (UTC+01:00)	Nestorovski (yellow card) 36'; Kovačić (yellow card) 46'	Report	Teklić (yellow card) 19'; Mejía (yellow card) 25'	Stadium: Gradski stadion Attendance: 823; Referee: Igor Pajač

4 April 2026 28	Dinamo Zagreb	7–0	Osijek	Zagreb
15:00 CEST (UTC+02:00)	Stojković 21'; Vidović 31', 62'; Zajc 42'; Beljo 58' (pen.), 68'; Mišić 81'	Report		Stadium: Stadion Maksimir; Attendance: 9,109; Referee: Ivan Vukančić

12 April 2026 29	Rijeka	0–2	Osijek	Rijeka
16:00 CEST (UTC+02:00)	Radeljić (yellow card) 21'; Oreč (yellow card) 38'; Barco (yellow card) 44'; Devetak (yellow card) 86'	Report	Akere 5'; Mejía (yellow card) 32'; Omerović 90+4'	Stadium: Stadion Rujevica; Attendance: 4,919; Referee: Mateo Erceg

17 April 2026 30	Osijek	0–2	Varaždin	Osijek
20:15 CEST (UTC+02:00)	Akere (yellow card) 33'; Kolarik (yellow card) 63'	Report	Tavares 11', 30'; Mamić (yellow card) 27'; Sikošek (yellow card) 47'; Duvnjak (yellow card) 60'; Canjuga (yellow card) 85'; Silić (yellow card) 90'; Mladenovski (yellow card) 90'	Stadium: Opus Arena; Attendance: 3,154; Referee: Ivan Vukančić

21 April 2026 31	Hajduk Split	0–1	Osijek	Split
18:45 CEST (UTC+02:00)	Šego (yellow card) 16'	Report	Bubanja 56'; Čolina (yellow card) 87'; Vrbančić (yellow card) 90+1'	Stadium: Stadion Poljud; Attendance: 10,154; Referee: Igor Pajač

25 April 2026 32	Osijek	0–0	Lokomotiva	Osijek
18:15 CEST (UTC+02:00)	Mejía (yellow card) 3'; Barišić (yellow card) 74'	Report	Pajač (yellow card) 24'; Dajčer (yellow card) 54'; Belcar (yellow card) 85'; Jukić (yellow card) 86'	Stadium: Opus Arena; Attendance: 2,874; Referee: Mateo Erceg

2 May 2026 33	Vukovar 1991	1–0	Osijek	Osijek
18:45 CEST (UTC+02:00)	Puljić (yellow card) 26' (goal) 56'; Živković (yellow card) 45+1'; Čaić (yellow card) 48'; Kulušić (yellow card) 90+4'	Report	Mejía (yellow card) 67'; Barišić (yellow card) 80'	Stadium: Stadion Gradski vrt Attendance: 6,048; Referee: Duje Strukan

10 May 2026 34	Osijek	0–1	Istra 1961	Osijek
16:00 CEST (UTC+02:00)	Barić (yellow card) 13'; Kolarik (yellow card) 17'; Jakupović (yellow card) 62'; Barišić (yellow card) 67'	Report	Prevljak 45'; Ahmeti (yellow card) 74'; Miettinen (yellow card) 75'; Maurić (yellow card) 88'; Kumar (yellow card) 90+2'	Stadium: Opus Arena; Attendance: 2,859; Referee: Igor Pajač

16 May 2026 35	Gorica	2–0	Osijek	Velika Gorica
16:00 CEST (UTC+02:00)	Bogojević 5' (yellow card) 60'; Erceg 12'; Pozo (yellow card) 28'; Pršir (yellow card) 69'	Report	Omerović (yellow card) 13'	Stadium: Stadion Radnik; Attendance: 380; Referee: Patrik Pavlešić

22 May 2026 36	Osijek	2–0	Slaven Belupo	Osijek
16:00 CEST (UTC+02:00)	Omerović 55'; Jovičić 62'	Report		Stadium: Opus Arena; Attendance: 1,572; Referee: Marko Crnojević

=== Croatian Cup ===
24 September 2025 First round	Uljanik	0–4	Osijek	Pula
16:00 CEST (UTC+02:00)	Zgrablić (yellow card) 11'	Report	Čolina 10'; Shopov (yellow card) 31' (goal) 65'; Vrbanac (yellow card) 75'; Petrusenko 85'; Toure 87'	Stadium: Stadion Veruda; Attendance: 400; Referee: Antonio Melnjak

3 December 2025 Second round	Varaždin	1–1 (a.e.t.) (4–2 p)	Osijek	Varaždin
17:00 CET (UTC+01:00)	Duvnjak 58'; Belcar (yellow card) 87'	Report	Hasić (yellow card) 5'; Jakupović 38'; Matković (yellow card) 100'; Jugović (yellow card) 119'	Stadium: Stadion Varteks; Attendance: 1,001; Referee: Duje Strukan
	Penalties
	Mamut (penalty scored); Vuk (penalty scored); Mamić (penalty scored); Jovanov (penalty scored)		Čolina (penalty missed); Cvijanović (penalty scored); Matković (penalty scored); Jugović (penalty missed)

=== Friendlies ===
==== Pre-season ====
2 July 2025 Friendly	Osijek (Croatia)	6–4	(Hungary) Szentlőrinc	Osijek, Croatia
18:00 CEST (UTC+02:00)	Farkaš 2'; Jakupović 4'; Omerović 16'; Živković 45+1'; Ohajunwa 79', 89'	Report	Nyári 9', 42'; Ambach 62'; Bőle 68'	Stadium: Opus Arena (training ground); Attendance: 0

5 July 2025 Friendly	Osijek (Croatia)	6–0	(Hungary) Kozármisleny	Osijek, Croatia
18:00 CEST (UTC+02:00)	Jakupović 17', 30'; Živković 38'; Omerović 40'; Ohajunwa 56'; Barić 88'	Report		Stadium: Opus Arena (training ground); Attendance: 0

12 July 2025 Friendly	Osijek (Croatia)	4–1 (Note: The game was played with 60 minute halves.)	(Romania) Olimpia Satu Mare	Lendava, Slovenia
17:00 CEST (UTC+02:00)	Živković 4'; Bukvić 14'; Omerović 35'; Jakupović 41'	Report	Calugher 33'	Stadium: Lendava Sports Park

16 July 2025 Friendly	Osijek (Croatia)	1–0	(Ukraine) Dynamo Kyiv	Söchau, Austria
17:00 CEST (UTC+02:00)	Jakupović 37'		Shaparenko (red card) 48'	Stadium: Kräuterdorfstadion Söchau; Referee: Julian Weinberger

17 July 2025 Friendly	Osijek (Croatia)	0–1	(Hungary) Újpest	Radomlje, Slovenia
17:00 CEST (UTC+02:00)		Report	Matko 83'	Stadium: Sports park Radomlje

24 July 2025 Friendly	Osijek	1–1	Cibalia	Osijek
19:00 CEST (UTC+02:00)	Dedić 63'	Report	Kuzminski 42'	Stadium: Opus Arena (training ground); Attendance: 0

25 July 2025 Friendly	Osijek	4–0	Slaven Belupo	Osijek
20:00 CEST (UTC+02:00)	Vrbančić 20'; Živković 53'; Barić 65'; Farkaš (yellow card) 75'; Shopov 76'	Report		Stadium: Opus Arena; Attendance: 2,500; Referee: Domagoj Kurtović

==== On-season (2025) ====
10 October 2025 Friendly	Osijek (Croatia)	2–1	(Hungary) Kozármisleny	Osijek, Croatia
15:00 CEST (UTC+02:00)	Toure 23', 64'	Report	Jelena 48'	Stadium: Opus Arena (training ground); Attendance: 0

14 November 2025 Friendly	Osijek (Croatia)	2–1	(Serbia) TSC	Osijek, Croatia
12:00 CET (UTC+01:00)	Omerović 21'; Jovičić 69'	Report	Savić 12'	Stadium: Opus Arena; Attendance: 0

==== Mid-season ====
9 January 2026 Friendly	Osijek (Croatia)	1–1	(Turkey) İstanbul Başakşehir	Belek, Turkey
16:00 CET (UTC+01:00)	Matković 40'	Report	Fayzullaev 23'	Stadium: Maxx Royal football center

13 January 2026 Friendly	Osijek (Croatia)	2–1 (Note: The game was played in 4 quarters of 30 minutes.)	(Hungary) Győr	Kadriye, Turkey
14:30 CET (UTC+01:00)	Čolina (yellow card) 30'; Teklić 46'; Ježić (yellow card) 92'; Mikolčić 120'	Report	Štefulj 8'; Szarka (yellow card) 59'	Stadium: Calista Sports Center

16 January 2026 Friendly	Osijek (Croatia)	1–3	(Azerbaijan) Qarabağ	Kadriye, Turkey
9:00 CET (UTC+01:00)	Jovičić 5'	Report	Qurbanlı 48'; Kashchuk 57'; Guseynov 90'	Stadium: Calista Sports Center

16 January 2026 Friendly	Osijek (Croatia)	2–0	(Azerbaijan) Sumgayit	Kadriye, Turkey
15:30 CET (UTC+01:00)	Bubanja (yellow card) 14' (yellow-red card) 62'; Teklić 36'; Peček (yellow card) 85'; Omerović 90' (pen.)	Report		Stadium: Calista Sports Center

==== On-season (2026) ====
12 May 2026 Friendly	Mladost-Sloga Draž	0–13 (Note: The game was played with 35 minute halves.)	Osijek	Draž
17:00 CEST (UTC+02:00)		Report	Ježić; Jovičić; Jakupović; Dedić; Akere; Teklić; (o.g.)	Stadium: Draž Stadium

== Player seasonal records ==
Updated 21 June 2026

=== Goals ===
Rank	Name	League	Cup	Total
1	(Bosnia and Herzegovina) Nail Omerović	8	–	8
2	(Austria) Arnel Jakupović	4	1	5
3	(Nigeria) Samuel Akere	3	–	3
3	(Croatia) Luka Jelenić	3	–	3
5	(Montenegro) Vladan Bubanja	2	–	2
5	(Croatia) Šimun Mikolčić	2	–	2
7	(Croatia) Hrvoje Babec	1	–	1
7	(Croatia) Niko Farkaš	1	–	1
7	(Croatia) Miloš Jovičić	1	–	1
7	(Australia) Fran Karačić	1	–	1
7	(Croatia) Anton Matković	1	–	1
7	(Austria) David Čolina	–	1	1
7	(Ukraine) Oleksandr Petrusenko	–	1	1
7	(Bulgaria) Stanislav Shopov	–	1	1
7	(Switzerland) Yannick Toure	–	1	1
TOTALS		27	4	31

Source: Competitive matches

=== Clean sheets ===
Rank	Name	League	Cup	Total
1	(Croatia) Marko Malenica	13	1	14
2	(Canada) Nikola Ćurčija	1	–	1
2	(Croatia) Matej Grahovac	1	–	1
TOTALS		15	1	16

Source: Competitive matches

=== Disciplinary record ===
Number	Position	Player	HNL			Croatian Cup			Total		
Number	Position	Player	Yellow card	(yellow card) (yellow-red card)	Red card	Yellow card	(yellow card) (yellow-red card)	Red card	Yellow card	(yellow card) (yellow-red card)	Red card
3	DF	(Croatia) Borna Barišić	3	0	0	0	0	0	3	0	0
4	DF	(Croatia) Krešimir Vrbanac	0	0	0	1	0	0	1	0	0
5	DF	(Albania) Jon Mersinaj	3	0	0	0	0	0	3	0	0
5	DF	(Armenia) Styopa Mkrtchyan	3	0	0	0	0	0	3	0	0
6	MF	(Croatia) Hrvoje Babec	2	0	0	0	0	0	2	0	0
6	MF	(Colombia) David Mejía	7	0	0	0	0	0	7	0	0
7	MF	(Croatia) Vedran Jugović	0	0	0	1	0	0	1	0	0
8	MF	(Croatia) Šimun Mikolčić	4	0	0	0	0	0	4	0	0
10	MF	(Bulgaria) Stanislav Shopov	3	0	0	1	0	0	4	0	0
11	MF	(Bosnia and Herzegovina) Nail Omerović	5	0	0	0	0	0	5	0	0
16	MF	(Ukraine) Oleksandr Petrusenko	3	1	0	0	0	0	3	1	0
17	FW	(Austria) Arnel Jakupović	3	0	0	0	0	0	3	0	0
18	MF	(Croatia) Niko Farkaš	1	0	0	0	0	0	1	0	0
21	MF	(Montenegro) Vladan Bubanja	4	0	0	0	0	0	4	0	0
22	DF	(Croatia) Roko Jurišić	2	1	0	0	0	0	2	1	0
23	MF	(Croatia) Luka Vrbančić	2	1	0	0	0	0	2	1	0
26	DF	(Croatia) Luka Jelenić	5	0	0	0	0	0	5	0	0
29	DF	(Australia) Fran Karačić	1	0	0	0	0	0	1	0	0
33	DF	(Sweden) Emin Hasić	4	1	0	1	0	0	5	1	0
34	FW	(Croatia) Anton Matković	1	0	0	1	0	0	2	0	0
38	DF	(Croatia) David Čolina	2	0	0	0	0	0	2	0	0
39	FW	(Croatia) Domagoj Bukvić	2	0	0	0	0	0	2	0	0
42	DF	(Brazil) Renan Guedes	3	0	0	0	0	0	3	0	0
46	FW	(Croatia) Ivan Barić	1	0	0	0	0	0	1	0	0
49	DF	(Croatia) Ivano Kolarik	3	0	0	0	0	0	3	0	0
55	DF	(Croatia) Ivan Cvijanović	1	0	0	0	0	0	1	0	0
57	FW	(Nigeria) Samuel Akere	2	0	0	0	0	0	2	0	0
99	MF	(Croatia) Tonio Teklić	1	0	0	0	0	0	1	0	0
TOTALS			71	4	0	5	0	0	76	4	0

=== Appearances and goals ===
Number	Position	Player	Apps	Goals	Apps	Goals	Apps	Goals
Number	Position	Player	Total		HNL (Note: First number represents appearances in starting eleven, while the second number indicates a substitute appearance.)		Croatian Cup	
1	GK	(Canada) Nikola Ćurčija	6	0	5+0	0	1+0	0
3	DF	(Croatia) Borna Barišić	10	0	7+3	0	0+0	0
4	DF	(Croatia) Krešimir Vrbanac	1	0	0+0	0	0+1	0
5	DF	(Albania) Jon Mersinaj	20	0	10+9	0	0+1	0
5	DF	(Armenia) Styopa Mkrtchyan	19	0	13+4	0	1+1	0
6	MF	(Croatia) Hrvoje Babec	16	1	13+2	1	1+0	0
6	MF	(Colombia) David Mejía	11	0	9+2	0	0+0	0
7	MF	(Croatia) Vedran Jugović	9	0	4+4	0	0+1	0
8	MF	(Croatia) Šimun Mikolčić	28	2	12+15	2	0+1	0
9	FW	(Switzerland) Yannick Toure	12	1	4+7	0	0+1	1
10	MF	(Bulgaria) Stanislav Shopov	14	1	9+4	0	1+0	1
11	MF	(Bosnia and Herzegovina) Nail Omerović	37	8	32+3	8	2+0	0
12	GK	(Croatia) Matej Grahovac	1	0	1+0	0	0+0	0
16	MF	(Ukraine) Oleksandr Petrusenko	25	1	17+7	0	1+0	1
17	FW	(Austria) Arnel Jakupović	32	5	24+6	4	2+0	1
18	MF	(Croatia) Niko Farkaš	8	1	3+4	1	0+1	0
21	MF	(Montenegro) Vladan Bubanja	17	2	14+3	2	0+0	0
22	DF	(Croatia) Roko Jurišić	20	0	12+7	0	1+0	0
23	MF	(Croatia) Luka Vrbančić	18	0	10+7	0	1+0	0
24	FW	(Croatia) Filip Živković	10	0	3+7	0	0+0	0
26	DF	(Croatia) Luka Jelenić	29	3	27+1	3	1+0	0
29	DF	(Australia) Fran Karačić	11	1	11+0	1	0+0	0
31	GK	(Croatia) Marko Malenica	31	0	30+0	0	1+0	0
33	DF	(Sweden) Emin Hasić	21	0	12+8	0	1+0	0
34	FW	(Croatia) Anton Matković	18	1	9+8	1	0+1	0
36	FW	(Croatia) Jakov Dedić	3	0	0+3	0	0+0	0
38	DF	(Croatia) David Čolina	31	1	23+6	0	2+0	1
39	FW	(Croatia) Domagoj Bukvić	36	0	22+12	0	2+0	0
40	MF	(Croatia) Fran Peček	2	0	0+1	0	1+0	0
42	DF	(Brazil) Renan Guedes	24	0	17+5	0	2+0	0
46	FW	(Croatia) Ivan Barić	10	0	2+8	0	0+0	0
47	DF	(Croatia) David Kalem	1	0	0+1	0	0+0	0
48	MF	(Croatia) Jona Ježić	3	0	0+3	0	0+0	0
49	DF	(Croatia) Ivano Kolarik	9	0	6+2	0	0+1	0
55	DF	(Croatia) Ivan Cvijanović	12	0	7+3	0	1+1	0
57	FW	(Nigeria) Samuel Akere	18	3	13+5	3	0+0	0
98	FW	(Croatia) Miloš Jovičić	13	1	6+6	1	0+1	0
99	MF	(Croatia) Tonio Teklić	13	0	9+4	0	0+0	0
