= List of football stadiums in Croatia =

The following is a list of football stadiums in Croatia, ranked in order of capacity, with the minimum capacity being 2,000. Stadiums in bold are part of the 2026–27 Croatian Football League.

== Current stadiums ==
#	Image	Stadium	Capacity	City	Home team	Opened
1		**Stadion Poljud**	33,987	Split	HNK Hajduk Split	1979
2		**Stadion Maksimir**	24,851 (35,423 before 2020 earthquake)	Zagreb	GNK Dinamo Zagreb; NK Lokomotiva Zagreb	1912
3		Stadion Gradski vrt	18,856	Osijek	ŽNK Osijek	1980
4		**Opus Arena**	13,005	Osijek	NK Osijek	2023
5		Stadion Kranjčevićeva	(under upgrade to 11,163)	Zagreb	currently not in use	2027
6		**Stadion Varteks**	10,800	Varaždin	NK Varaždin	1931
7		Stadion Kantrida	10,600	Rijeka	NK Opatija	1913
8		**Stadion Aldo Drosina**	9,800	Pula	NK Istra 1961	1994
9		Stadion HNK Cibalia	8,200	Vinkovci	HNK Cibalia	1963
10		**Stadion Rujevica**	8,191	Rijeka	HNK Rijeka	2015
11		Stadion Kamen Ingrad	7,095	Velika	NK Papuk Velika	1999
12		Gradski Stadion uz Savu	6,000 (under upgrade to 10,000)	Slavonski Brod	NK Marsonia	1979
13		Gradski stadion	6,000	Sisak	HNK Segesta	1956
14		Gradski stadion u Borovu Naselju	6,000	Vukovar	HNK Vukovar 1991	1933
15		ŠC Sloboda	6,000	Varaždin	NK Sloboda Varaždin	1987
16		Ivan Laljak-Ivić Stadium	5,228	Zaprešić	NK Inker Zaprešić	1987
17		Stadion Hrvatski vitezovi	5,200	Dugopolje	NK Dugopolje	2009
18		Kajzerica Sports Field	5,000	Zagreb		1952
19		Stadion Park	5,000	Suhopolje	HNK Suhopolje	?
20		Stadion Hitrec-Kacian	5,000	Zagreb	GNK Dinamo II	?
21		Stadion Stari plac	5,000	Split	HNK Hajduk Split (1911–1979)	1911
22		Stadion SRC Mladost	5,000	Čakovec	NK Međimurje	1987
23		**Stadion Radnik**	4,536	Velika Gorica	HNK Gorica; NK Rudeš	1987
24		Stadion Park Mladeži	4,075	Split	RNK Split	1955
25		Gradski stadion	4,000	Bjelovar	NK Bjelovar	2022
26		Stadion Robert Komen	4,000	Rijeka	NK Zamet	1975
27		Stadion Stanovi	3,858	Zadar	NK Zadar	1979
28		Stadion Krimeja	3,500	Rijeka	HNK Orijent 1919	1923
29		Stadion ŠRC Sesvete	3,500	Sesvete	NK Sesvete	1957
30		Stadion Šubićevac	3,412	Šibenik	HNK Šibenik	1948
31		Stadion Branko Čavlović-Čavlek	3,400	Karlovac	NK Karlovac	1975
32		**Ivan Kušek Apaš City Stadium**	3,205	Koprivnica	NK Slaven Belupo	1996
33		Stadion ŠC Rudeš	3,112	Zagreb	NK Rudeš (2012–2017, 2019–2022)	2012
34		Gradski stadion	3,096	Sinj	NK Junak Sinj	2006
35		Stadion Lapad	3,000	Dubrovnik	NK GOŠK Dubrovnik	1919
36		Gradski sportski centar	3,000	Makarska	HNK Zmaj Makarska	
37		Stadion Iza vage	3,000	Metković	NK Neretva	
38		Stadion NŠC Stjepan Spajić	3,000	Zagreb	NK Hrvatski dragovoljac	2000
39		Stadion Gospin dolac	2,766	Imotski	NK Imotski	1989
40		Stadion Veruda	2,500	Pula	NK Uljanik	1986
41		Gradski Stadion Sajmište	2,500	Vrbovec	NK Vrbovec	2001
42		Stadion pokraj Jadra	2,500	Solin	NK Solin	?

== See also ==
- List of European stadiums by capacity
- List of association football stadiums by capacity
- Lists of stadiums
- Football in Croatia
