= Filip Živković =

Croatian footballer (born 2006)

Personal information
- Date of birth: 1 August 2006 (age 20)
- Place of birth: Osijek, Croatia
- Height: 1.84 m (6 ft 0 in)
- Positions: Attacking midfielder; winger

Team information
- Current team: Sarajevo (on loan from Osijek)
- Number: 24

Youth career
- –2023: Osijek

Senior career*
Years	Team	Apps	(Gls)
2023–	Osijek	45	(1)
2026–	→ Sarajevo (loan)	18	(1)

International career
2022–2023	Croatia U17	13	(1)
2023–2024	Croatia U18	7	(4)
2024–2025	Croatia U19	12	(5)
- * Club domestic league appearances and goals as of 8 November 2026

Filip Živković (born 1 August 2006) is a Croatian professional footballer who plays as an attacking midfielder or winger for Bosnian Premier League club Sarajevo on loan from Osijek. He has represented Croatia at youth international level from under-17 to under-19.

== Club career ==
Živković progressed through the youth academy of NK Osijek. He was promoted to the senior team in 2023 and made his professional debut at the age of 16. On 19 May 2023, he set a new record as the youngest goalscorer in the club's history. He made 49 appearances and scored three goals for the club in domestic competitions.

In 2026, Živković joined Bosnian Premier League club FK Sarajevo on loan from NK Osijek.

== International career ==
Živković has represented Croatia at multiple youth levels.

== Career statistics ==
=== Club ===
As of match played 8 November 2026

Appearances and goals by club, season and competition
Club	Season	League			National cup (Note: Includes Croatian Cup, Bosnian Cup)		Total	
Club	Season	Division	Apps	Goals	Apps	Goals	Apps	Goals
Osijek	2022–23	Croatian Football League	10	0	1	1	11	1
Osijek	2023–24	Croatian Football League	7	0	1	0	8	0
Osijek	2024–25	Croatian Football League	18	1	2	1	20	2
Osijek	2025–26	Croatian Football League	10	0	0	0	10	0
Osijek	Total		45	1	4	2	49	3
Sarajevo (loan)	2025–26	Bosnian Premier League	8	1	0	0	8	1
Sarajevo (loan)	2026–27	Bosnian Premier League	10	0	1	0	11	0
Sarajevo (loan)	Total		18	1	1	0	19	1
Career total			63	2	5	2	68	4
