= Nail Omerović =

Bosnian association football player (born 2002)

Personal information
- Date of birth: 20 October 2002 (age 24)
- Place of birth: Tuzla, Bosnia and Herzegovina
- Height: 1.74 m (5 ft 9 in)
- Position: Winger

Team information
- Current team: Estoril Praia
- Number: 11

Youth career
- 2016–2020: Zvijezda Gradačac

Senior career*
Years	Team	Apps	(Gls)
2020–2021	Sloboda Tuzla	3	(0)
2021–2022	Osijek II	25	(4)
2022–2026	Osijek	118	(19)
2026–	Estoril Praia	2	(0)

International career^{‡}
2023–2024	Bosnia and Herzegovina U21	8	(0)
2024–	Bosnia and Herzegovina	5	(1)
- * Club domestic league appearances and goals as of 20 September 2026 ‡ National team caps and goals as of 12 October 2025

Nail Omerović (born 20 October 2002) is a Bosnian professional footballer who plays as a winger for Primeira Liga club Estoril Praia and the Bosnia and Herzegovina national team.

== Club career ==
After not being able to train earlier in his hometown, Omerović started his football career at the age of 15 at NK Zvijezda Gradačac. He played for Sloboda Tuzla before joining NK Osijek in 2021, initially playing for NK Osijek II. Omerović signed a new three-year contract with the club in February 2023. He scored his first goal off the club on 17 December 2023, in a 4-1 league win over Slaven Belupo. He made 30 appearances for NK Osijek in the 2023–24 season in all competitions, scoring that one goal.

== International career ==
Omerović was called up to the Bosnia and Herzegovina national under-21 football team in October 2023. In May 2024, he was called up to the senior Bosnia and Herzegovina squad for their June friendly matches against England and Italy.

On 14 October 2024, Omerović made his senior national team debut in a 2–0 UEFA Nations League victory against Hungary at the Bilino Polje Stadium. He appeared as a substitute for Jusuf Gazibegović at half-time. In the second half, Omerović fouled for a penalty kick just four minutes later, which was converted by Dominik Szoboszlai of Hungary.

Omerović started for Bosnia and Herzegovina in a UEFA Nations League away match against Germany. Germany ran out 7–0 winners in the game held in Freiburg.

== Career statistics ==
=== Club ===
As of match played 20 September 2026

Appearances and goals by club, season and competition
Club	Season	League			National cup (Note: Includes Bosnian Cup, Croatian Cup)		Continental		Total	
Club	Season	Division	Apps	Goals	Apps	Goals	Apps	Goals	Apps	Goals
Sloboda Tuzla	2020–21	Bosnian Premier League	3	0	1	0	—		4	0
Osijek II	2021–22	Druga HNL	25	4	—		—		25	4
Osijek	2022–23	Prva HNL	17	0	1	0	—		18	0
Osijek	2023–24	Prva HNL	27	1	3	0	1 (Note: Appearance(s) in UEFA Conference League)	0	31	1
Osijek	2024–25	Prva HNL	34	4	4	0	3	0	41	4
Osijek	2025–26	Prva HNL	35	9	2	0	—		37	9
Osijek	2026–27	Prva HNL	5	5	0	0	—		5	5
Osijek	Total		118	19	10	0	4	0	132	19
Estoril Praia	2026–27	Primeira Liga	2	0	0	0	—		2	0
Career total			148	23	11	0	4	0	163	23

=== International ===
As of match played 12 October 2025

Appearances and goals by national team and year
National team	Year	Apps	Goals
Bosnia and Herzegovina	2024	2	0
Bosnia and Herzegovina	2025	3	1
Total		5	1

Scores and results list Bosnia and Herzegovina's goal tally first, score column indicates score after each Omerović goal.

List of international goals scored by Nail Omerović
No.	Date	Venue	Cap	Opponent	Score	Result	Competition
1	12 October 2025	National Stadium, Ta' Qali, Malta	5	Malta	4–1	4–1	Friendly
