= Luka Tunjić =

Croatian footballer (born 2005)

Personal information
- Date of birth: 19 November 2005 (age 20)
- Place of birth: Hamburg, Germany
- Height: 1.83 m (6 ft 0 in)
- Position: Attacking midfielder

Youth career
- 2012–2017: TuS Hamburg
- 2017–2019: SC V/W Billstedt
- 2019–2020: Niendorfer TSV
- 2020–2024: Holstein Kiel

Senior career*
Years	Team	Apps	(Gls)
2024–2026	Fortuna Sittard	28	(3)

International career^{‡}
2022	Bosnia and Herzegovina U17	2	(0)
2023	Bosnia and Herzegovina U19	1	(0)
2025–	Croatia U21	8	(2)
- * Club domestic league appearances and goals as of 21 May 2026 ‡ National team caps and goals as of 18 November 2025

Luka Tunjić (born 19 November 2005) is a professional football player who plays as an attacking midfielder. Born in Germany and a former youth representative for Bosnia and Herzegovina, he is a youth international for Croatia.

== Career ==
Tunjić is a product of the youth academies of TuS Hamburg, SC V/W Billstedt, Niendorfer TSV and Holstein Kiel. On 24 July 2024, he transferred to the Eredivisie side Fortuna Sittard on a contract until 2026.

== International career ==
Tunjić was born in Germany to Bosnian-Croat parents. He played for the Bosnia and Herzegovina U17s and U19 in 2022 and 2023 respectively. In March 2025, he accepted a call-up to the Croatia U21s.
