= Maksimir Stadium =

Multiuse stadium in Zagreb, Croatia

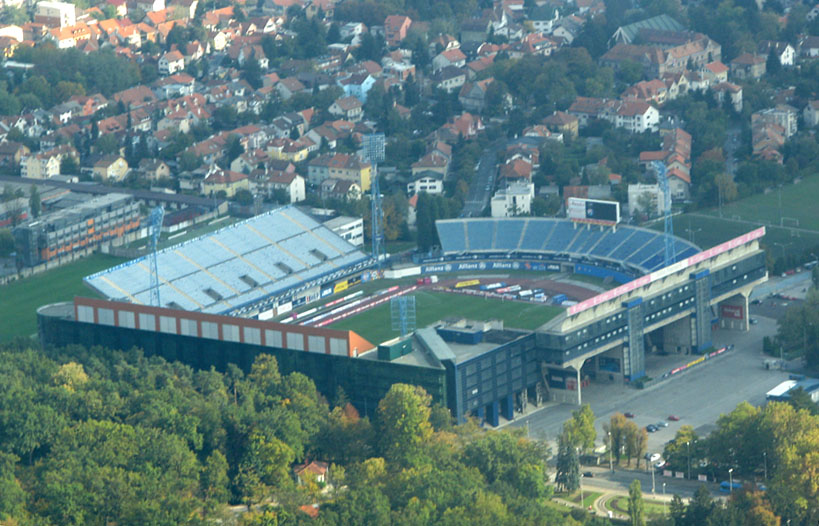
- Aerial view
- Interactive map of Maksimir Stadium
- Full name: Maksimir Stadium
- Location: Maksimir, Zagreb, Croatia
- Coordinates: 45°49′8″N 16°1′5″E
- Operator: GNK Dinamo Zagreb
- Capacity: 25,912 (interim)
- Surface: Hybrid grass
- Record attendance: 64,138 (NK Zagreb vs NK Osijek, 19 July 1973)
- Field size: 105 m × 68 m (344 ft × 223 ft)

Construction
- Opened: 5 May 1912; 114 years ago
- Renovated: 1948, 1998, 2011
- Architects: Vladimir Turina, Branko Kincl

Tenants
- HAŠK (1912–1945); HŠK Građanski (1912–1924); GNK Dinamo Zagreb (1948–present); ŽNK Dinamo Zagreb (selected matches); Croatia national football team (1990–present); NK Lokomotiva (2009–2017, 2025-present)

Maksimir Stadium (Croatian: Stadion Maksimir, pronounced [ˈstâdioːn mǎksimiːr]) is a multi-use stadium in Zagreb, Croatia. Named after the surrounding neighbourhood of Maksimir, it is one of the largest stadiums in the country with a current seating capacity of 25,912 and a maximum possible capacity of 35,423. It is the home stadium of Croatian club Dinamo Zagreb and has been used since 1990 by the Croatia national football team for the majority of international competitions.

Built 114 years ago in 1912, the stadium underwent renovations in 1948, 1998, and 2011. Its facilities can be converted into a concert stage which has been used to host musical acts.

Maksimir Stadium has four stands: north, east, west, and south, with all seats seated, and no standing places for spectators in the stadium.

A major renovation of the stadium in June 2011 saw new seats installed, and a greater distance created between seats.

Due to the strong earthquake that struck Zagreb on March 22, 2020, the east stand has not been open to spectators.

== History ==
=== The construction and the early years ===
With the rising popularity of the sport in Zagreb, the local football club HAŠK, which was one of the first multi-sports club in Croatia, decided to build a new stadium for their club. They bought the ground in the Svetice neighbourhood in Zagreb, which lies on the opposite side of the Maksimir Park, from the Archdiocese of Zagreb. HAŠK built a wooden stand with a capacity of 6,000, which was also the first ground with a proper stand in Zagreb at that time. The stadium was opened on 5 May 1912, and at the opening ceremony of the new stadium, HAŠK and their city rival, HŠK Građanski Zagreb, played several friendly matches to commemorate the opening. Due to the close relationship and alliance of HAŠK and HŠK Građanski Zagreb and the latter one playing at the Stadion Koturaška, which was in a poor state, Građanski also started playing their home matches at the new Stadium Maksimir.

On 26 May 1941, a representative of the Ustashe fascist government of the Independent State of Croatia addressed young Zagreb students at their meeting at the Maksimir Stadium, and at one point ordered the Serbian and Jewish students to be segregated, but the children disobeyed. Soon afterwards, in June 1941, rebel youths burned the stadium down. The 1977 film Operation Stadium was made to commemorate the segregation incident.

=== After World War II and the development ===
After World War II, Građanski got dissolved by the newly established communist regime of Yugoslavia and a new club, FD Dinamo Zagreb, inherited the clubs' colours, honours and the ground and is, therefore, the direct successor of HŠK Građanski Zagreb. When the UEFA Euro 1976 final tournament was held in Yugoslavia, Maksimir hosted the Netherlands v. Czechoslovakia semi-final match and the Netherlands v. Yugoslavia third place match. Maksimir was the central venue for the 1987 Summer Universiade hosted by the city of Zagreb.

In 1990, several events happened at Maksimir. On 13 May, the Dinamo Zagreb–Red Star Belgrade riot took place, an infamous riot involving Dinamo Zagreb and Red Star Belgrade supporters. The last match of the Yugoslavia national football team was hosted at Maksimir on 3 June. On 17 October of the same year, Croatia played the United States in what was Croatia's first match in the modern era.

=== In modern times ===
In 1998, plans were made for a massive renovation, and the first phase started the same year. The old northern stand was demolished and a new one built within a year. This renovation increased Maksimir's seating capacity to 38,079. After 1992, for 16 years the Croatian football team had a proud unbeaten record at this stadium in any competitive match, however, on 10 September 2008 (two years after suffering a 2–0 defeat at the same venue) England became the first team to beat Croatia in Zagreb, winning 4–1, ending a thirty match undefeated streak.

In the summer of 2011, a little, but much needed "facelifting" was made on the stadium. All seats were replaced, a new drainage system, under-soil heating and automatic watering were installed along with a new turf, the athletic track was covered with blue artificial grass and all brick surfaces were covered in blue cloth.

=== 2020 earthquake ===
The earthquake, which happened on the morning of 22 March 2020, damaged the structural stability of the stadium. After an inspection by a structural engineer, the Maksimir stadium was deemed "temporarily unusable". The eastern stand, which is also the biggest single stand by capacity, took the most damage and is awaiting the final decision following a detailed building inspection. While waiting, the club is allowed to host matches on the Maksimir stadium, but with the eastern stand being closed for viewers.

In August 2023, Maksimir was ranked the third ugliest football stadium in Europe according to research carried out by the Money agency based on reviews on platforms such as Google, TripAdvisor and Football Ground.

== Capacity per sector ==
Four stands (8 sectors) contribute to the total seating capacity of 35,423: 25,912 with the East stand closed.

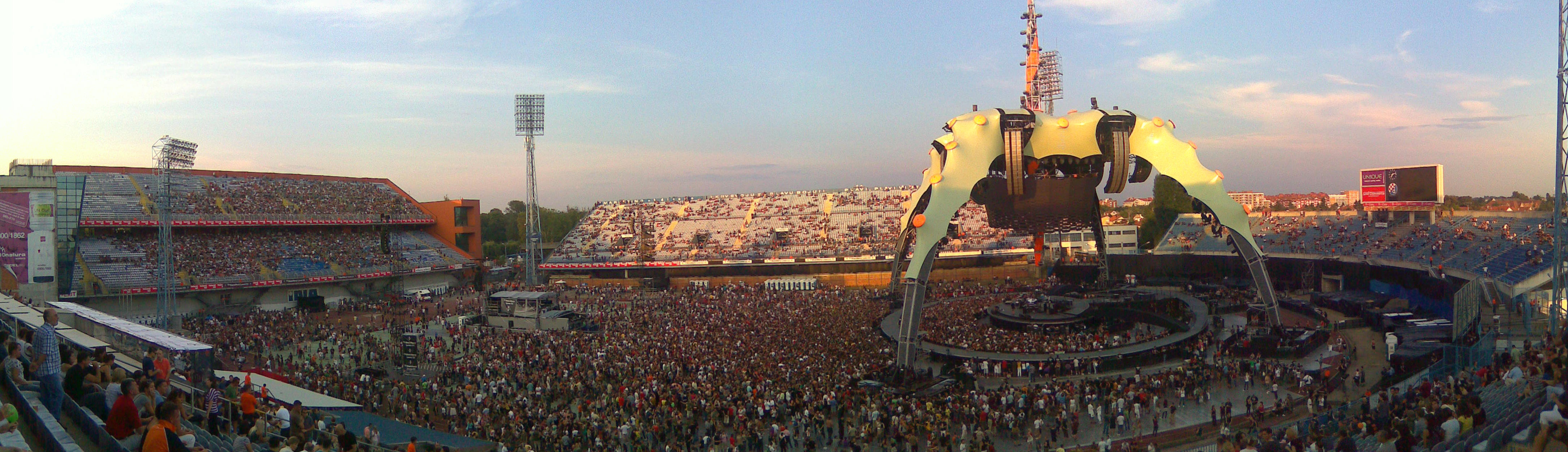
Irish rock band U2 sold 2 shows in two consecutive nights with their 360° Tour in front of 124,012 people

- North stand (up): 4,510
- North stand (down): 4,950
- North stand (VIP): 300
- West stand (up): 5,101
- West stand (down): 6,369
- West stand (VIP): 748
- East stand: 9,514 – temporarily closed due to earthquake damage
- South stand: 3,931

== International matches ==
Date		Result		Competition
25 June 1952	Yugoslavia	4–1	Norway	International friendly
18 October 1953	Yugoslavia	3–1	France	International friendly
9 May 1954	Yugoslavia	0–2	Belgium	International friendly
17 June 1956	Yugoslavia	1–1	Austria	1955–60 Central European International Cup
12 September 1956	PR Croatia	5–2	Indonesia	Unofficial friendly
12 May 1957	Yugoslavia	6–1	Italy	1955–60 Central European International Cup
5 October 1958	Yugoslavia	4–4	Hungary	International friendly
19 November 1961	Yugoslavia	2–1	Austria	International friendly
30 September 1962	Yugoslavia	2–3	West Germany	International friendly
3 November 1963	Yugoslavia	2–0	Czechoslovakia	International friendly
8 May 1966	Yugoslavia	2–0	Hungary	International friendly
18 November 1970	Yugoslavia	2–0	West Germany	International friendly
21 October 1973	Yugoslavia	0–0	Spain	1974 FIFA World Cup qualification
28 September 1974	Yugoslavia	1–0	Italy	International friendly
15 October 1975	Yugoslavia	3–0	Sweden	UEFA Euro 1976 qualifying
24 April 1976	Yugoslavia	2–0	Wales	UEFA Euro 1976 quarter-final
16 June 1976	Czechoslovakia	3–1 (a.e.t.)	Netherlands	UEFA Euro 1976 semi-final
19 June 1976	Netherlands	3–2 (a.e.t.)	Yugoslavia	UEFA Euro 1976 third place play-off
8 May 1977	Yugoslavia	0–2	Romania	1978 FIFA World Cup qualification
4 October 1978	Yugoslavia	1–2	Spain	UEFA Euro 1980 qualifying
13 June 1979	Yugoslavia	4–1	Italy	International friendly
12 November 1983	Yugoslavia	0–0	France	International friendly
6 September 1989	Yugoslavia	3–1	Scotland	1990 FIFA World Cup qualification
3 June 1990	Yugoslavia	0–2	Netherlands	International friendly
17 October 1990	Croatia	2–1	United States	Unofficial friendly
22 October 1992	Croatia	3–0	Mexico	International friendly
25 June 1993	Croatia	3–1	Ukraine	International friendly
4 June 1994	Croatia	0–0	Argentina	International friendly
9 October 1994	Croatia	2–0	Lithuania	UEFA Euro 1996 qualifying
25 March 1995	Croatia	4–0	Ukraine	UEFA Euro 1996 qualifying
26 April 1995	Croatia	2–0	Slovenia	UEFA Euro 1996 qualifying
3 September 1995	Croatia	7–1	Estonia	UEFA Euro 1996 qualifying
10 November 1996	Croatia	1–1	Greece	1998 FIFA World Cup qualification
6 September 1997	Croatia	3–2	Bosnia and Herzegovina	1998 FIFA World Cup qualification
29 October 1997	Croatia	2–0	Ukraine	1998 FIFA World Cup qualification play-off
6 June 1998	Croatia	7–0	Australia	International friendly
14 October 1998	Croatia	3–2	Macedonia	UEFA Euro 2000 qualifying
28 April 1999	Croatia	0–0	Italy	International friendly
21 August 1999	Croatia	2–1	Malta	UEFA Euro 2000 qualifying
4 September 1999	Croatia	1–0	Republic of Ireland	UEFA Euro 2000 qualifying
9 October 1999	Croatia	2–2	FR Yugoslavia	UEFA Euro 2000 qualifying
29 March 2000	Croatia	1–1	Germany	International friendly
28 May 2000	Croatia	0–2	France	International friendly
11 October 2000	Croatia	1–1	Scotland	2002 FIFA World Cup qualification
6 October 2001	Croatia	1–0	Belgium	2002 FIFA World Cup qualification
27 March 2002	Croatia	0–0	Slovenia	International friendly
17 April 2002	Croatia	2–0	Bosnia and Herzegovina	International friendly
29 March 2003	Croatia	4–0	Belgium	UEFA Euro 2004 qualifying
11 October 2003	Croatia	1–0	Bulgaria	UEFA Euro 2004 qualifying
15 November 2003	Croatia	1–1	Slovenia	UEFA Euro 2004 qualifying play-off
31 March 2004	Croatia	2–2	Turkey	International friendly
4 September 2004	Croatia	3–0	Hungary	2006 FIFA World Cup qualification
9 October 2004	Croatia	2–2	Bulgaria	2006 FIFA World Cup qualification
26 March 2005	Croatia	4–0	Iceland	2006 FIFA World Cup qualification
30 March 2005	Croatia	3–0	Malta	2006 FIFA World Cup qualification
8 October 2005	Croatia	1–0	Sweden	2006 FIFA World Cup qualification
7 October 2006	Croatia	7–0	Andorra	UEFA Euro 2008 qualifying
11 October 2006	Croatia	2–0	England	UEFA Euro 2008 qualifying
24 March 2007	Croatia	2–1	Macedonia	UEFA Euro 2008 qualifying
6 June 2007	Croatia	0–0	Russia	UEFA Euro 2008 qualifying
8 September 2007	Croatia	2–0	Estonia	UEFA Euro 2008 qualifying
13 October 2007	Croatia	1–0	Israel	UEFA Euro 2008 qualifying
6 September 2008	Croatia	3–0	Kazakhstan	2010 FIFA World Cup qualification
10 September 2008	Croatia	1–4	England	2010 FIFA World Cup qualification
15 October 2008	Croatia	4–0	Andorra	2010 FIFA World Cup qualification
6 June 2009	Croatia	2–2	Ukraine	2010 FIFA World Cup qualification
5 September 2009	Croatia	1–0	Belarus	2010 FIFA World Cup qualification
7 September 2010	Croatia	0–0	Greece	UEFA Euro 2012 qualifying
12 October 2010	Croatia	2–1	Norway	International friendly
17 November 2010	Croatia	3–0	Malta	UEFA Euro 2012 qualifying
6 September 2011	Croatia	3–1	Israel	UEFA Euro 2012 qualifying
15 November 2011	Croatia	0–0	Turkey	UEFA Euro 2012 qualifying play-off
29 February 2012	Croatia	1–3	Sweden	International friendly
7 September 2012	Croatia	1–0	Macedonia	2014 FIFA World Cup qualification
22 March 2013	Croatia	2–0	Serbia	2014 FIFA World Cup qualification
7 June 2013	Croatia	0–1	Scotland	2014 FIFA World Cup qualification
11 October 2013	Croatia	1–2	Belgium	2014 FIFA World Cup qualification
19 November 2013	Croatia	2–0	Iceland	2014 FIFA World Cup qualification play-off
9 September 2014	Croatia	2–0	Malta	UEFA Euro 2016 qualifying
28 March 2015	Croatia	5–1	Norway	UEFA Euro 2016 qualifying
10 October 2015	Croatia	3–0	Bulgaria	UEFA Euro 2016 qualifying
5 September 2016	Croatia	1–1	Turkey	2018 FIFA World Cup qualification
12 November 2016	Croatia	2–0	Iceland	2018 FIFA World Cup qualification
24 March 2017	Croatia	1–0	Ukraine	2018 FIFA World Cup qualification
3 September 2017	Croatia	1–0	Kosovo	2018 FIFA World Cup qualification
9 November 2017	Croatia	4–1	Greece	2018 FIFA World Cup qualification play-off
15 November 2018	Croatia	3–2	Spain	2018–19 UEFA Nations League A
21 March 2019	Croatia	2–1	Azerbaijan	UEFA Euro 2020 qualifying
11 October 2020	Croatia	2–1	Sweden	2020–21 UEFA Nations League A
14 October 2020	Croatia	1–2	France	2020–21 UEFA Nations League A
22 September 2022	Croatia	2–1	Denmark	2022–23 UEFA Nations League A
21 November 2023	Croatia	1–0	Armenia	UEFA Euro 2024 qualifying
12 October 2024	Croatia	2–1	Scotland	2024–25 UEFA Nations League A
8 September 2025	Croatia	4–0	Montenegro	2026 FIFA World Cup qualification

== Concerts ==
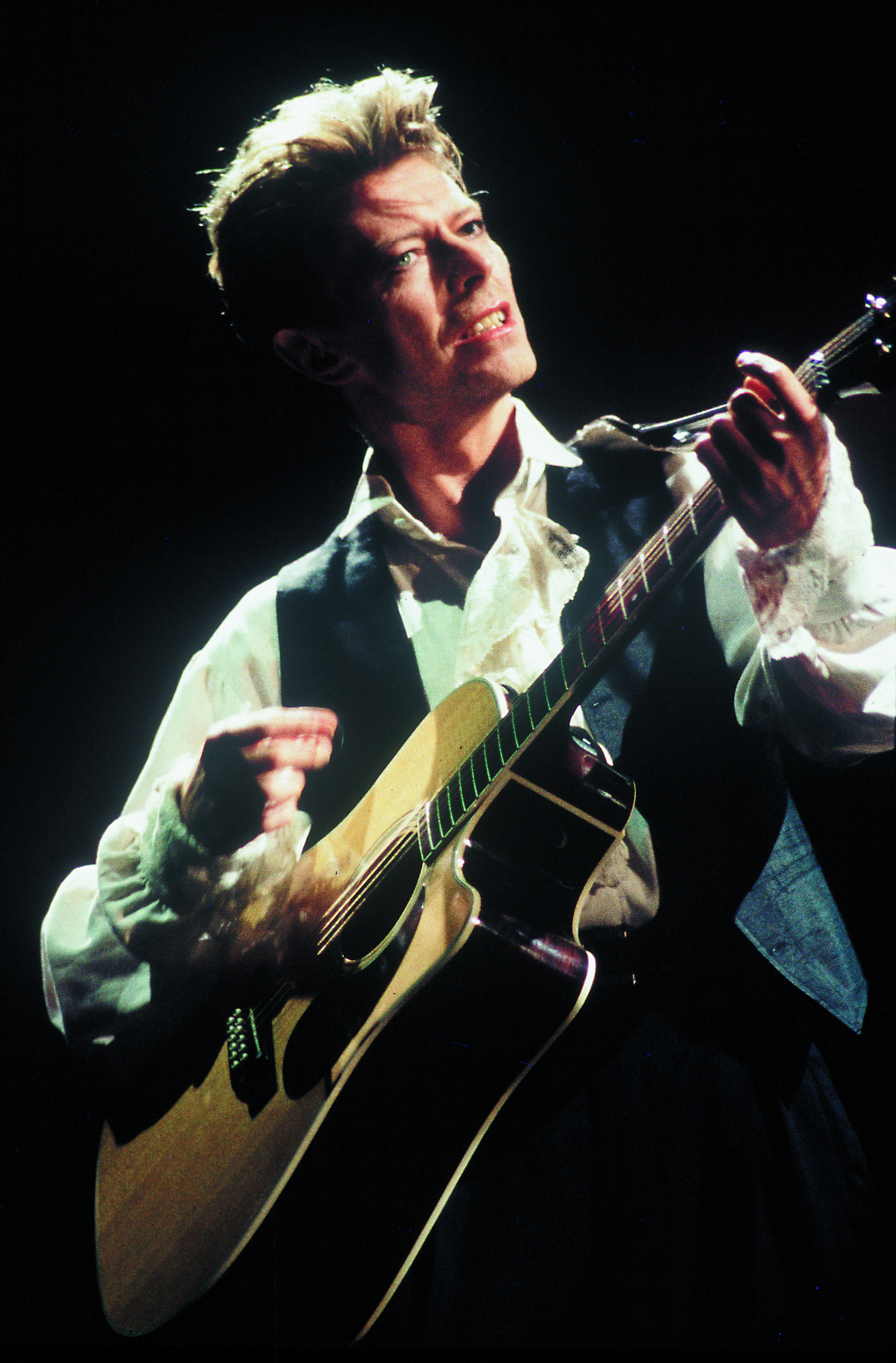
David Bowie performing on Maksimir Stadium in 1990 during his Sound+Vision Tour

The stadium has also been used as the venue for some big concerts, including:

Date	Headlining Artist	Concert or Tour	Attendance
5 September 1990	David Bowie	Sound+Vision Tour	50,000
14 June 1994	Oliver Dragojević & Gibonni	Cesarica	40,000
2000	Gibonni	Judi, zviri i beštimje	32,000
22 June 2005	Bijelo Dugme	Turneja 2005: Sarajevo, Zagreb, Beograd	70,000
17 June 2007	Marko Perković Thompson	Turneja: Bilo jednom u Hrvatskoj Maksimir	70,000
09 June 2009	U2	360° Tour	124,012
10 June 2009	U2	360° Tour	124,012
8 June 2011	Bon Jovi	Bon Jovi Live	33,698
13 August 2013	Robbie Williams	Take the Crown Stadium Tour	45,000
04 June 2022	Various performers	Progledaj srcem	44,000

- On 11 June 2012, Madonna was scheduled to perform a concert as a part of the MDNA Tour, but the concert was cancelled due to logistic reasons.
- On 23 May 2013, Depeche Mode was scheduled to perform a concert as a part of their Delta Machine Tour, but the concert was changed to the Arena Zagreb due to logistic reasons.

== Renovation plans ==
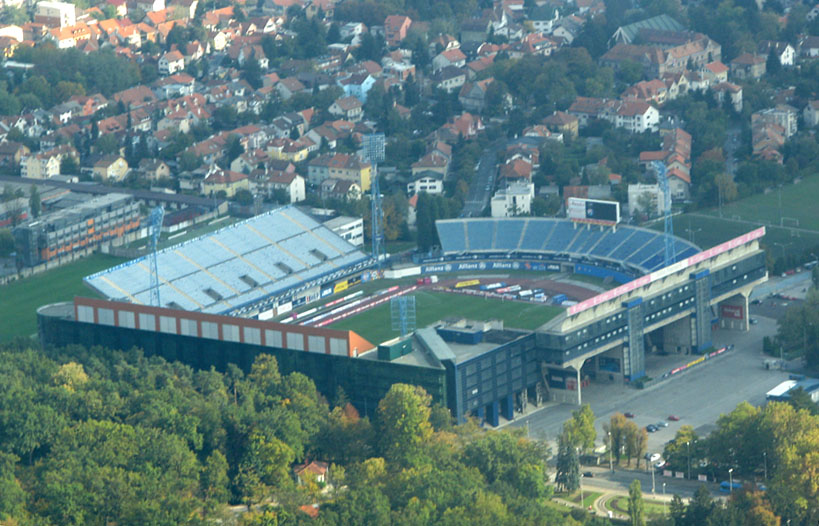
Maksimir before 2011 facelifting

The 1998 renovations plans included lowering the pitch and adding seating where the current running track is, gaining 16,000 seats. The plans also included the addition of a modern roof structure. Maksimir was to have a capacity of 60,000 and was to be an exclusively football stadium. However, in the beginning of the 2000s, the renovations were suspended.

In 2008, the Zagreb city government presented two potential stadiums; Project Maksimir at the current location and Project Vulkan (Volcano), which was proposed for the Kajzerica neighbourhood. The two proposals were to go to a citizens vote, however, little progress was made.

=== Kajzerica Proposal ===
Artist's concept for the proposed stadium, nicknamed Blue Volcano

The design competition for the new stadium was won by architect Hrvoje Njirić in May 2008. The winning design, nicknamed "Blue Volcano" (Croatian: Plavi vulkan), would have a capacity of 55,000 and would include a blue-coloured polycarbonate dome exterior and a cloud-like structure suspended above the stadium covered in photovoltaic panels.

The referendum about the proposal, which had originally been scheduled for June 2008, was postponed several times since and has not been held. In October 2012, the project was abandoned, to be briefly revived in 2013 with an eye to a possible UEFA Euro 2020 bid, and again in 2018, following Croatia's historic success in the World Cup.

=== Recent Plans ===
There were talks in 2018 that the stadium was going to be demolished and a new, state-of-the-art stadium would be built on the same location. In 2019, Dinamo Zagreb announced that it will demolish Maksimir and build a new stadium on its own, without the help of the Croatian Government, but needed confirmation from the governing body of Zagreb and its mayor, Milan Bandić. Shortly after, it was announced that Dinamo Zagreb and the City of Zagreb will enter a joint collaboration to build the new stadium. The new stadium was supposed to be built on the ground of the current Maksimir Stadium and have had a capacity of 30,000 spectators. The stadium would have had a garage, shopping centre, hotel and several fan corners. After the 2020 Zagreb earthquake, the talks were, once again, put on hold.

Between 1997 and 2015, a total of HRK 800 million (c. €108 million) has been spent renovating the stadium.

As of October 2022, Marko Milić of the Croatian government, has guaranteed that there will be a new Maksimir built with help of the government and the city of Zagreb.

In June 2023, the Mayor of Zagreb Tomislav Tomašević announced plans to reconstruct Stadion Kranjčevićeva, the second major stadium of Zagreb. The plans included the increase of the stadium capacity to 12,000 seats with a total remodelling of all four stands. At the unveiling of the plans, Tomašević said that the plan was for Dinamo Zagreb to leave Maksimir and play out of Kranjčevićeva on completion in 2025 so that the old stadium at Maksimir can be demolished and a new stadium built in its place.

In July 2023, the two major football stadiums in Croatia, Maksimir and Poljud were declared sports buildings of national interest by the Croatian Government. The decision was said to confirm the government's intention to construct a new stadium in Maksimir and complete significant renovations to Poljud.

In December 2023, the Croatian Government, the City of Zagreb, and the Zagreb Archdiocese reached a resolution on a land rights dispute that would allow the construction of a new stadium at the location of the current Maksimir Stadium to proceed. This was seen previously as one of the more difficult hurdles to overcome in relation to the stadium reconstruction process.

On February 21, 2025, the Government and the City formally unveiled the construction plans for the entirely new 35,000-seat Maksimir Stadium, confirming a joint funding model—€175 million to be split 50/50 between state and city authorities. A public tender for the architectural design is expected later that year, with demolition of the existing stadium to follow once the adjacent Kranjčevićeva Stadium is upgraded (scheduled by the end of 2026); the new Maksimir is anticipated to open by late 2028 or early 2029 to meet UEFA and FIFA standards.

== See also ==
- List of football stadiums in Croatia
- List of European stadiums by capacity
