= Opus Arena =

Football stadium in Osijek, Croatia

- Stadion NK Osijek
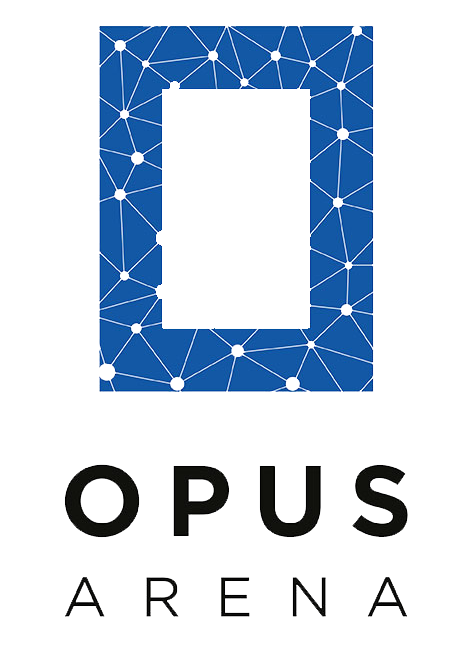

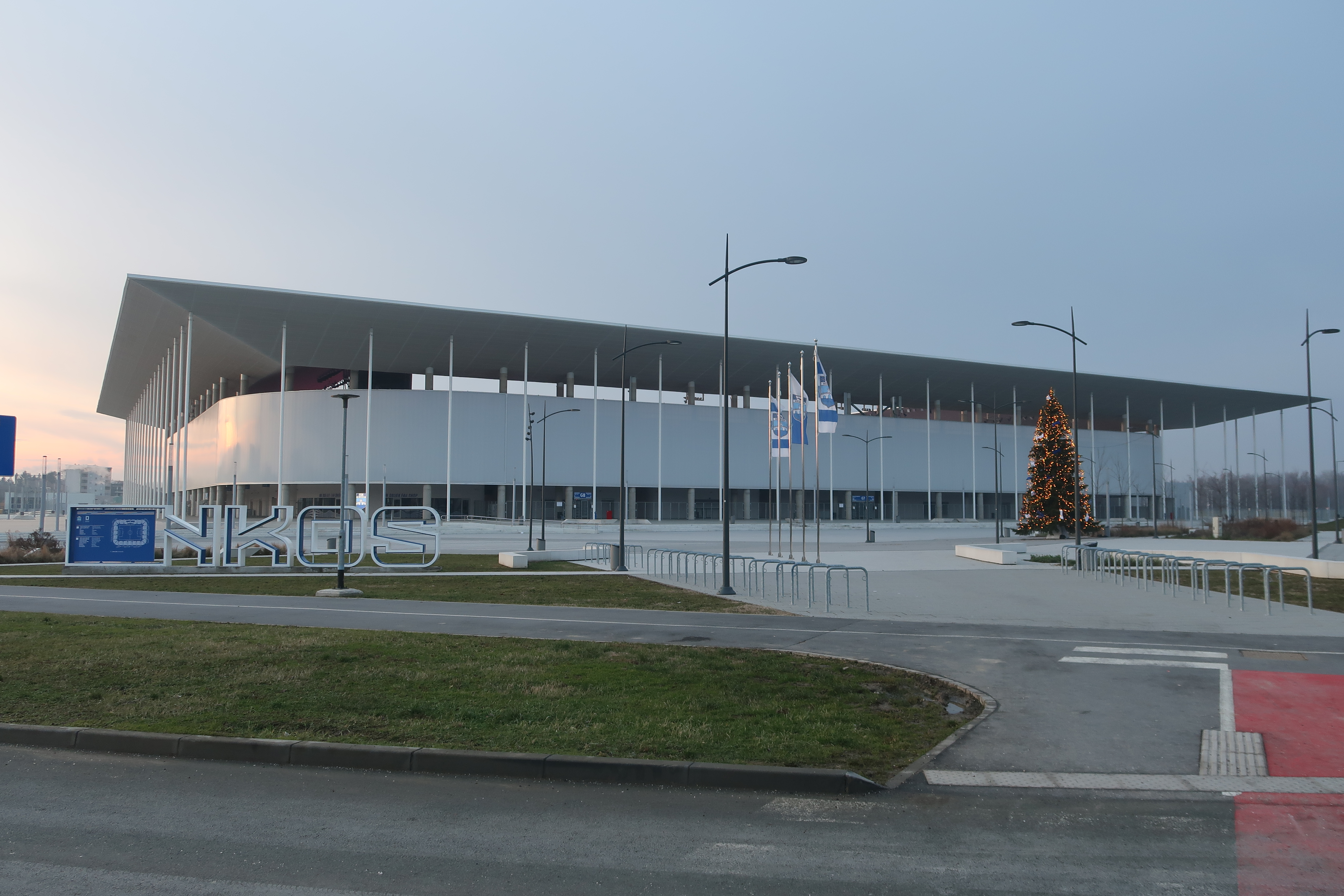
- UEFA

- Location in Croatia Location in Europe
- Interactive map of Opus Arena
- Full name: Opus Arena
- Location: Retfala, Osijek, Croatia
- Coordinates: 45°33′59″N 18°39′27″E
- Owner: NK Osijek Football Academy
- Operator: NK Osijek
- Capacity: 13,005
- Executive suites: 9
- Surface: Hybrid grass
- Field size: 105 × 68 metres

Construction
- Groundbreaking: December 2017
- Opened: 1 July 2023
- Cost: €65 million
- Architect: Sirrah Projekt d.o.o.
- Main contractors: Osijek Asfalt d.o.o. Eurokamen d.o.o. Strabag d.o.o.

Tenants
- NK Osijek (2023–present); Croatia national football team (selected matches)

Opus Arena is a football stadium in Osijek, Croatia, in the city's Retfala district. Its seating capacity of 13,005 makes it the fourth-largest stadium in Croatia. The stadium is used by NK Osijek and the Croatia national football team for both domestic and international competitions.

Built from 2017 to 2023, the stadium was informally known as the Pampas Stadium (Croatian: Stadion Pampas), after the name of the neighborhood in which it was built, before securing sponsorship from Hungarian asset management firm Opus Global. It was constructed for local club team NK Osijek as a successor precinct Gradski Vrt Stadium. For UEFA and FIFA competitions, it is known as Stadion NK Osijek, due to limits on corporate sponsorships.

Financed at an estimated €65 million by NK Osijek, Opus Global and a grant from the Hungarian government, Opus Arena is the first to cover its entire seating capacity. The precinct also acts as the training base of the club, with seven football pitches adjoining the stadium.

== History ==
The project was officially announced on 19 April 2018, in the Osijek movie theater "Urania", by the former president of the club Ivan Meštrović.

Early enabling works on the site began in late 2017, when the site preparation was carried out. The plot was raised by 1.5 meter through additional landfill. With the site spanning 15.3 hectares, this represented thousands of truckloads. In April 2019, within a month, 1,000 piles (each 12 meters deep) were inserted into the ground, ensuring future stability of the stadium.

In November 2019, the most famous NK Osijek player and former Croatian Football Federation president Davor Šuker announced a symbolic €1 million contribution from the federation to the project.

On March 27, 2023, the new stadium and training camp of the Osijek Football Club received a valid use permit for the construction of a sports and recreational building - the Football School and Stadium of NK Osijek. In the next phase, until the official opening of only the stadium and the training camp, there will be the furnishing of the interior rooms and the sowing of grass, i.e. the installation of artificial surfaces on the auxiliary fields.

In June 2023, the Croatian Football Federation confirmed that the national team will open its qualifying campaign for UEFA Euro 2024 in the stadium against Turkey.

== Specifications ==
The size of the precinct is 15.3 hectares. There are 750 parking spaces available to the public and 150 VIP parking spaces. It is a Category 4 UEFA stadium.

The initial project included boxes in the West Stand, which included beds, saunas and Jacuzzis. At the beginning of 2022, the club representatives announced that the West Stand won't feature saunas and jacuzzis, as originally planned. Instead, the initially planned area has been reduced and is being used as a hotel and training area for players. Also, due to the reduction of the mentioned area, the total capacity of the stadium rose from 12,750 to 13,005. The adjoining camp has seven heated pitches and entertainment facilities for players.

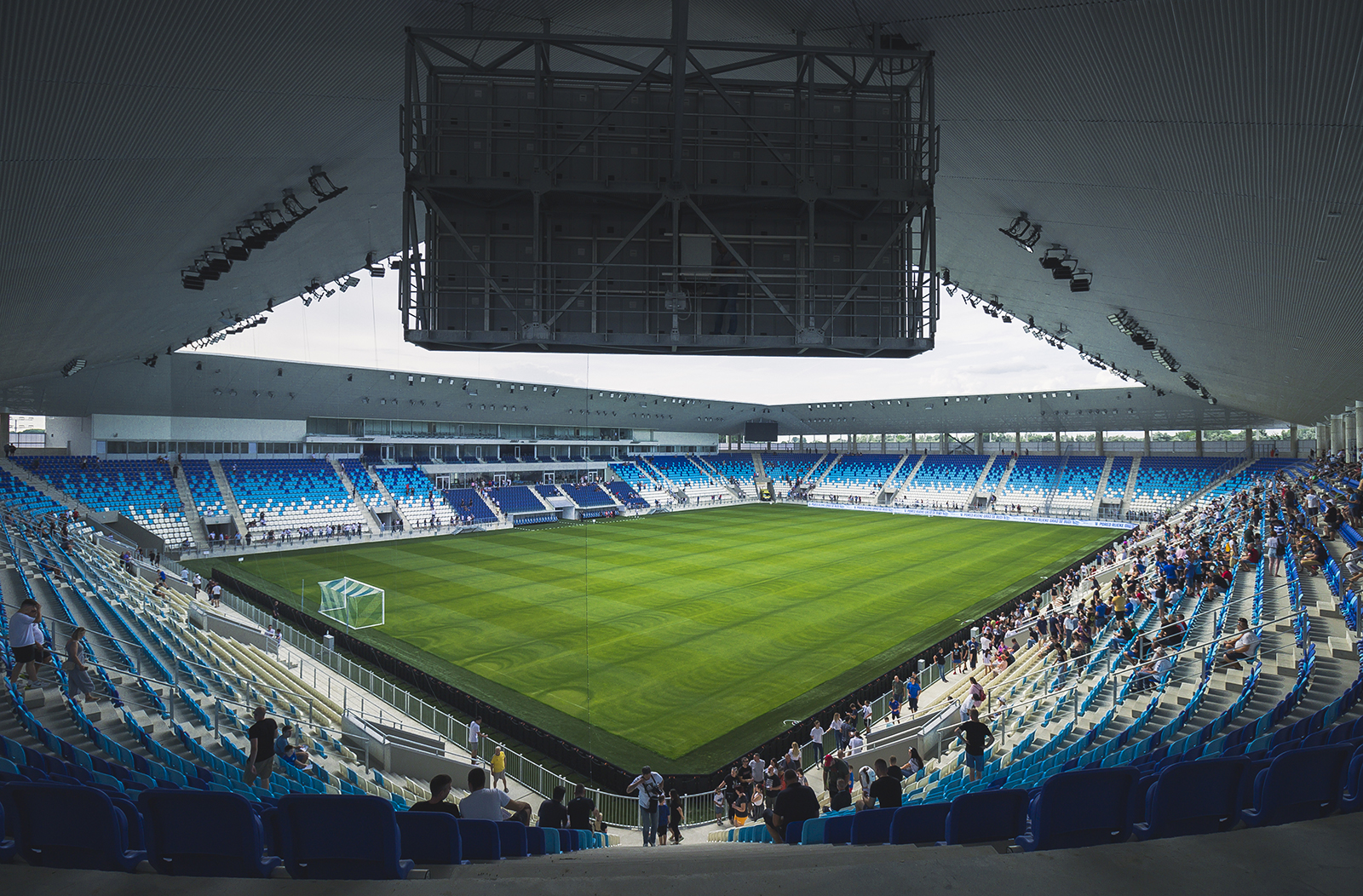
View from southeast, 2023

The stadium has an official capacity of 13,005, which can be extended to 14,750 and is the first all-covered stadium in the country. Roughly 550 seats are of higher standard, of which 100 spread across 7 skyboxes. The roof (188x150m) stretches outside the stadium, ensuring shade or rain protection and making it a more friendly public area. Hovering 22.5 meters above ground, it is the landmark element. The stadium's facade is translucent, ensuring sufficient sunlight access by day to facilities beneath the stands. Divided into 12 horizontal rings, the facade is illuminated in varying colours, making the stadium attractive by night.

== International matches ==
Date	Competition	Opponent	Score	Att.	Ref
Croatia men's national football team
12 October 2023	UEFA Euro 2024 qualifying – Group D	Turkey	0–1	12,812	
8 September 2024	2024–25 UEFA Nations League A – Group 1	Poland	1–0	12,612	
9 June 2025	2026 FIFA World Cup UEFA qualifying – Group L	Czech Republic	5–1	12,207	
15 November 2026	2026–27 UEFA Nations League A – Group 3	Czech Republic	–		
Croatia women's national football team
23 February 2024	2023–24 UEFA Women's Nations League B - Promotion play-offs	Norway	0–3	3,132	

== See also ==
- List of football stadiums in Croatia
- List of European stadiums by capacity
- Lists of stadiums
