= Niko Farkaš =

Croatian footballer (born 2006)

Personal information
- Date of birth: 29 November 2006 (age 19)
- Place of birth: Šenkovec, Croatia
- Position: Midfielder

Team information
- Current team: NK Osijek
- Number: 18

Youth career
- NK Šenkovec
- -2022: NŠ Međimurje
- 2022–2025: NK Osijek

Senior career*
Years	Team	Apps	(Gls)
2025-	Osijek	15	(2)

International career
2024-2025	Croatia U18		
2025-	Croatia U19		
- * Club domestic league appearances and goals as of 2 November 2026

Niko Farkaš (born 29 November 2006) is a Croatian footballer who plays as a midfielder for Croatian Football League club NK Osijek.

== Club career ==
A left-footed player, Farkaš started his youth career as a six-year-old at NK Šenkovec, where he was coached by his father, and initially wanted to be a goalkeeper. He then played in the youth teams at NŠ Međimurje.

Farkaš later came through the NK Osijek youth system having made the move in the summer of 2022. He won the Croatian Youth Cup with the coin in 2024, scoring in the cup final against Slaven Belupo. That summer, he extended his contract with the club until 2026. He made his debut in the Croatian Football League as a late substitute in a 4–1 win against Slaven Belupo on 4 May 2025. On 27 October 2025, he scored his first senior league goal with a volley in a 4–2 defeat away against Rijeka.

== International career ==
A Croatian youth international, he played for Croatia U18, scoring his first goal at that level against Montenegro U18 in 2024. He went on to feature for Croatia U19 and Croatia U20 in 2025.

== Personal life ==
He is from Šenkovec in Međimurje County, Croatia. His brother Matija is also a footballer. He is left-handed.
