= Luka Vrbančić =

Croatian footballer (born 2005)

Personal information
- Date of birth: 4 July 2005 (age 21)
- Place of birth: Zagreb, Croatia
- Height: 1.82 m (6 ft 0 in)
- Position: Midfielder

Team information
- Current team: NK Osijek
- Number: 21

Senior career*
Years	Team	Apps	(Gls)
2024–2025	Dinamo Zagreb	6	(1)
2024	→ Dubrava (dual registration)	11	(1)
2024	→ Lokomotiva Zagreb (loan)	26	(3)
2025–	Osijek	24	(1)

International career
2023-	Croatia U19	6	(3)
- * Club domestic league appearances and goals as of 13 September 2026

Luka Vrbančić (born 4 July 2005) is a Croatian footballer who plays as a midfielder for NK Osijek.

== Club career ==
A product of the Dinamo Zagreb academy, he joined the club when he was ten years-old. He plays as a central midfielder. He made a goalscoring debut for Dynamo Zagreb in an away cup match against NK Ponikve, helping them secure a 4–1 victory on 27 September 2023.

He joined NK Dubrava on loan in January 2024, making his debut in 2.HNL on 25 January 2024 against NK Jarun Zagreb. After returning to Dynamo, he scored a 93rd-minute goal in a 3–2 win over Slaven Belupo that clinched the 1.HNL league title for Dynamo in May 2024.

In September 2024, he joined NK Lokomotiva Zagreb on loan to gain further first team experience. He made his debut for his new club away in the Croatian Football Cup against NK Samobor in a 4–2 win, on 11 September 2024. He made his league debut three days later in a 2-0 NHL win against NK Istra 1961. He scored his first goal for Lokomotiva in a 5–1 away defeat to Dinamo Zagreb on 28 September 2024.

== Style of play ==
Due to his style of play and appearance, including his red hair colour, he has been compared to English and former Manchester United footballer Paul Scholes.

== International career ==
He is a Croatia youth international. He scored for the Croatia national under-18 football team against England U18 in a 2–1 defeat on 22 March 2023. He made his debut for the Croatia U19 team on 15 November 2023, scoring both goals in a 2–1 win over Armenia U19. In October 2024, he was called up to the Croatia national under-21 football team by head coach Ivica Olić.
