= 2025–26 in Hungarian football =

Football in Hungary
- Season: 2025–26

Men's football
- Fizz Liga: Győri ETO
- Merkantil Bank Liga: Vasas
- Nemzeti Bajnokság III: Gyirmót, Kisvárda II, Nagykanizsa, Monor
- MOL Magyar Kupa: Ferencváros

Women's football
- Simple Női Liga: Ferencváros
- Simple Női Kupa: Ferencváros

The 2025–26 season is the 127th season of competitive association football in Hungary.

Times are CET/CEST, (Note: CEST (UTC+2) for matches until 26 October 2025 (matchdays 1–4), and CET (UTC+1) for matches thereafter (matchdays 5–6).) as listed by UEFA (local times, if different, are in parentheses).

== National teams ==
=== Hungary men's national football team ===
==== 2024–25 UEFA Nations League ====
===== Promotion/relegation play-offs =====
Team 1	Agg.	Team 2	1st leg	2nd leg
Turkey	6–1	Hungary	3–1	3–0

Turkey won 6–1 on aggregate and were promoted to League A, while Hungary were relegated to League B.

===== Group F =====
Team 1	Score	Team 2
Republic of Ireland	2–2	Hungary
Hungary	2–3	Portugal
Hungary	2–0	Armenia
Portugal	2–2	Hungary
Armenia	0–1	Hungary
Hungary	2–3	Republic of Ireland

Pos	Team	Pld	W	D	L	GF	GA	GD	Pts	Qualification	(Portugal national football team)	(Republic of Ireland national football team)	(Hungary national football team)	(Armenia national football team)
1	Portugal	6	4	1	1	20	7	+13	13	Qualified for the 2026 FIFA World Cup	—	1–0	2–2	9–1
2	Republic of Ireland	6	3	1	2	9	7	+2	10	Advanced to play-offs	2–0	—	2–2	1–0
3	Hungary	6	2	2	2	11	10	+1	8		2–3	2–3	—	2–0
4	Armenia	6	1	0	5	3	19	−16	3		0–5	2–1	0–1	—

Source: FIFA, UEFA

===== Friendly =====
Team 1	Score	Team 2
Hungary	0–2	Sweden
Azerbaijan	1–2	Hungary
Hungary	1–0	Slovenia
Hungary	0–0	Greece
Hungary	2–1	Finland
Hungary	3–1	Kazakhstan

===== Matches =====
20 March 2025 NL Rel. Play-off	Turkey	3–1	Hungary	Istanbul, Turkey
18:00 CET (20:00 TRT (UTC+03:00))	Kökçü 9'; Aktürkoğlu 69'; Can Kahveci 75'	Report	Schäfer 25'	Stadium: Rams Park; Attendance: 38,500; Referee: Ivan Kružliak (Slovakia)

23 March 2025 NL Rel. Play-off	Hungary	0–3 (1–6 agg.)	Turkey	Budapest, Hungary
18:00 CET (UTC+01:00)		Report	Çalhanoğlu 37' (pen.); Güler 39'; Bardakcı 90'	Stadium: Puskás Aréna; Attendance: 57,861; Referee: Felix Zwayer (Germany)

6 June 2025 Friendly	Hungary	0–2	Sweden	Budapest, Hungary
19:30 CEST (UTC+02:00)	Zs. Nagy (yellow card) 48'	Report	Ayari (yellow card) 37' (goal) 65'; Sema (yellow card) 40'; Nygren 49'; Ekdal 80'	Stadium: Puskás Aréna; Attendance: 55,000; Referee: Atilla Karaoglan (Turkish)

10 June 2025 Friendly	Azerbaijan	1–2	Hungary	Baku, Azerbaijan
18:00 CEST (20:00 AZT (UTC+04:00))	Dadaşov 7'; Makhmudov (yellow card) 54'; T. Bayramov (yellow card) 60'; A. Hüseynov (yellow card) 76'; Kh. Aliyev (yellow card) 84'; Rustamli (yellow card) 90+6'	Report	B. Varga 5'; Szoboszlai 33'; Schäfer (yellow card) 84'	Stadium: Dalga Arena; Attendance: 1,200; Referee: Viktor Shimusik (Belarus)

6 September 2025 World Cup qualification	Republic of Ireland	2–2	Hungary	Dublin, Ireland
20:45 CEST (19:45 BST (UTC+01:00))	Ferguson (yellow card) 42' (goal) 49'; Cullen (yellow card) 54'; Collins (yellow card) 90'; Idah 90+3'	Report (FIFA); Report (UEFA)	B. Varga 2' (yellow card) 79'; Sallai 15' (red card) 52'; Szoboszlai (yellow card) 30'; A. Szalai (yellow card) 48'; Dibusz (yellow card) 60'; B. Tóth (yellow card) 85'	Stadium: Aviva Stadium; Attendance: 51,137; Referee: Harm Osmers (Germany)
Note: • Hungary: Dibusz — Nego, Orbán, A. Szalai, Kerkez (Zs. Nagy (substituted on) 80') — Szoboszlai (c), Styles — Bolla (Mocsi (substituted on) 67'), A. Tóth (Ötvös (substituted on) 55'), Sallai — B. Varga (B. Tóth (substituted on) 80') • Manager: Rossi

9 September 2025 World Cup qualification	Hungary	2–3	Portugal	Budapest, Hungary
20:45 CEST (UTC+02:00)	B. Varga 21', 84' (yellow card) 57'	Report (FIFA); Report (UEFA)	Silva 36'; Ronaldo 58' (pen.); Neves (yellow card) 77'; Cancelo 86'; Palhinha (yellow card) 90+6'	Stadium: Puskás Aréna; Attendance: 61,473; Referee: Erik Lambrechts (Belgium)
Note: • Hungary: B. Tóth — Nego, Orbán, A. Szalai — Bolla (Gruber (substituted on) 90'), Szoboszlai (c), Styles (Vitális (substituted on) 81'), Kerkez (M. Dárdai (substituted on) 90') — A. Tóth (Ötvös (substituted on) 60'), Zs. Nagy (Lukács (substituted on) 60') — B. Varga • Manager: Rossi

11 October 2025 World Cup qualification	Hungary	2–0	Armenia	Budapest, Hungary
18:00 CEST (UTC+02:00)	Lukács 56'; Gruber 90+4'	Report (FIFA); Report (UEFA)	Arutyunyan (yellow card) 14'	Stadium: Puskás Aréna; Attendance: 57,285; Referee: Chris Kavanagh (England)

14 October 2025 World Cup qualification	Portugal	2–2	Hungary	Lisbon, Portugal
20:45 CEST (19:45 WEST (UTC+01:00))	Ronaldo 22', 45+3'; Fernandes (yellow card) 34'; João Félix (yellow card) 90'	Report (FIFA); Report (UEFA)	Szalai 8'; Styles (yellow card) 50'; Szoboszlai 90+1'; Lukács (yellow card) 90+5'	Stadium: Estádio José Alvalade; Attendance: 47,854; Referee: Srđan Jovanović (Serbia)

13 November 2025 World Cup qualification	Armenia	0–1	Hungary	Yerevan, Armenia
18:00 CET (21:00 AMT (UTC+04:00))	Ranos (yellow card) 52'	Report (FIFA); Report (UEFA)	B. Varga 33'; Schäfer (yellow card) 83'	Stadium: Vazgen Sargsyan Republican Stadium; Attendance: 14,247; Referee: José María Sánchez (Spain)
Note: • Hungary: B. Tóth — Négo, Orbán, A. Szalai, Kerkez (M. Dárdai (substituted on) 90') — Schäfer, Styles (Vitális (substituted on) 75') — Bolla (Osváth (substituted on) 75'), A. Tóth (Zs. Nagy (substituted on) 63'), Szoboszlai (c) — Lukács (Gruber (substituted on) 63') • Head coach: Rossi

16 November 2025 World Cup qualification	Hungary	2–3	Republic of Ireland	Budapest, Hungary
15:00 CET (UTC+01:00)	Lukács 4'; Varga 37' (yellow card) 90+5'; A. Szalai (yellow card) 45+2'	Report (FIFA); Report (UEFA)	Parrott 15' (pen.), 80', 90+6' (yellow card) 90+6'; Scales (yellow card) 68'; Cullen (yellow card) 78'; Festy (yellow card) 89'	Stadium: Puskás Aréna; Attendance: 59,411; Referee: Espen Eskås (Norway)
Note: • Hungary: Dibusz — Négo (Mocsi (substituted on) 90+3'), Orbán, A. Szalai, Kerkez — Schäfer (Styles (substituted on) 64'), A. Tóth (Bolla (substituted on) 76') — Lukács (Ötvös (substituted on) 64'), Szoboszlai (c), Sallai (Redzic (substituted on) 90+3') — B. Varga • Head coach: Rossi

28 March 2026 Friendly	Hungary	1–0	Slovenia	Budapest, Hungary
18:00 CET (UTC+01:00)	M. Dárdai (yellow card) 69'; Schön 79'	Report (UEFA)	Čerin (yellow card) 38'; Ratnik (yellow card) 53'; Zec (yellow card) 71'	Stadium: Puskás Aréna; Attendance: 50,252; Referee: Rohit Saggi (Norway)
Note: • Hungary: B. Tóth — Bolla (Osváth (substituted on) 46'), Orbán, M. Dárdai, Kerkez (Zs. Nagy (substituted on) 77') — A. Tóth (Redzic (substituted on) 63'), Schäfer (T. Szűcs (substituted on) 63'), Vitális — Sallai (Schön (substituted on) 77'), Szoboszlai (c) (Baráth (substituted on) 87') — Lukács (Bárány (substituted on) 46') • Head coach: Rossi

31 March 2026 Friendly	Hungary	0–0	Greece	Budapest, Hungary
19:00 CEST (UTC+02:00)	Osváth (yellow card) 63'	Report (UEFA)	Koulierakis (yellow card) 48'; Rota (yellow card) 90+1'	Stadium: Puskás Aréna; Attendance: 54,849; Referee: Florian Badstübner (German)
Note: • Hungary: B. Tóth — Bolla (Osváth (substituted on) 46'), Orbán, M. Dárdai, Kerkez — Schäfer, Vitális (T. Szűcs (substituted on) 67') — Redzic (Lukács (substituted on) 46'), A. Tóth (Bárány (substituted on) 46' (substituted off) 77' (Schön (substituted on) 77')), Szoboszlai (c) — Sallai • Head coach: Rossi

5 June 2026 Friendly	Hungary	2–1	Finland	Budapest, Hungary
19:45 CEST (UTC+02:00)	Osváth (yellow card) 4'; B. Varga 25', 43'; K. Szűcs (yellow card) 85'	Report (UEFA)	Suhonen (yellow card) 36'; T. Miettinen 71'	Stadium: Puskás Aréna; Attendance: 53,148; Referee: Ante Čulina (Croatian)
Note: • Hungary: Szappanos (Á. Yaakobishvili (substituted on) 64') — Osváth (K. Szűcs (substituted on) 46'), Orbán, Csinger, Kerkez (Zs. Nagy (substituted on) 80') – Schäfer (Lukács (substituted on) 72'), Vitális (T. Szűcs (substituted on) 64') – Sallai, A. Tóth (Redzic (substituted on) 46'), Szoboszlai (c) – B. Varga (B. Kovács (substituted on) 72') • Head coach: Rossi

9 June 2026 Friendly	Hungary	3–1	Kazakhstan	Debrecen, Hungary
19:00 CEST (UTC+02:00)	Szoboszlai 52'; Schäfer 67'; T. Szűcs (yellow card) 74'; R. Tóth 90+3'; Markgráf (yellow card) 90+5'	Report (UEFA)	Malyi 9' (yellow card) 90+5'; Kenzhebek (yellow card) 17'; Samorodov (yellow card) 28' (yellow-red card) 63'; Satpayev (yellow card) 33'; Orazov (yellow card) 40'; Kuat (yellow card) 45+2'	Stadium: Nagyerdei Stadion; Attendance: 19,595; Referee: Pavle Ilić (Serbia)
Note: • Hungary: B. Tóth (Pécsi (substituted on) 62') — Osváth (R. Tóth (substituted on) 76'), Orbán, Markgráf, Styles (Zs. Nagy (substituted on) 62') — Schäfer, Vitális (B. Kovács (substituted on) 62') — Redzic (Lukács (substituted on) 46'), Szoboszlai (c), A. Tóth (T. Szűcs (substituted on) 46') — B. Varga (Baráth (substituted on) 84') • Head coach: Rossi

=== Hungary men's under-21 national football team ===
==== UEFA European Under-21 Championship ====
Team 1	Score	Team 2
Lithuania	1–1	Hungary
Ukraine	3–3	Hungary
Hungary	1–1	Turkey
Hungary	0–2	Croatia
Hungary	1–2	Ukraine

Pos	Team	Pld	W	D	L	GF	GA	GD	Pts	Qualification	Croatia	Turkey	Ukraine	Hungary	Lithuania
1	Croatia	5	4	1	0	11	1	+10	13	Final tournament	—	3–0	1–0	26 Sep	4–0
2	Turkey	6	3	2	1	7	6	+1	11	Final tournament or play-offs	1–1	—	1–0	6 Oct	2–0
3	Ukraine	6	2	2	2	10	7	+3	8		2 Oct	26 Sep	—	3–3	1–1
4	Hungary (Y)	5	0	3	2	6	9	−3	3		0–2	1–1	1–2	—	1 Oct
5	Lithuania (E)	6	0	2	4	3	14	−11	2		6 Oct	1–2	0–4	1–1	—

Updated to match(es) played on 31 March 2026. Source: UEFA
Rules for classification: Tiebreakers
(E) Eliminated; (Y) Cannot qualify directly; may still reach the play-offs

==== Friendly ====
Team 1	Score	Team 2
Iceland	3–0	Hungary
Republic of Ireland	3–1	Hungary
Hungary	1–2	Albania
Austria	3–1	Hungary
Hungary	3–0	Faroe Islands
Hungary	0–1	Israel

===== Matches =====
24 March 2025 Friendly	Iceland	3–0	Hungary	Pedro del Pinatar, Spain
	Mikaelsson 15'; Yaakobishvili 36' (o.g.); Harðarson 69'	Report		Stadium: Pinatar Arena

24 March 2025 Friendly	Republic of Ireland	3–1	Hungary	San Pedro del Pinatar, Spain
19:00 GMT	Melia 16' (pen.); McManus 79', 83'	Report	Jurek 33'	Stadium: Pinatar Arena

5 June 2025 Friendly	Hungary	1–2	Albania	Kecskemét, Hungary
	Á. Dragóner 74'	Report	Dodaj 46'; Osmani 76'	Stadium: Széktói Stadion; Attendance: 300; Referee: Christian Petru Ciochirca (Austria)

10 June 2025 Friendly	Austria	3–1	Hungary	Wiener Neustadt, Austria
	Jánó 26'; Reischl 60'; Kameri 74'	Report	Bakti 23'

9 September 2025 European Championship qualification	Lithuania	1–1	Hungary	Druskininkai, Lithuania
18:00 (19:00 UTC+3)	Audinis 90+1'	Report	Tuboly 9' (pen.)	Stadium: LSC Druskininkai Stadium; Attendance: 223

10 October 2025 European Championship qualification	Ukraine	3–3	Hungary	Murska Sobota, Slovenia (Note: Due to the Russian invasion of Ukraine, Ukraine are required to play their home matches at neutral venues until further notice.)
18:00	Stepanov 8'; Matkevych 75'; Krupskyi 85'	Report	Tuboly 37' (pen.); Molnár 60'; Fenyő 80'	Stadium: Fazanerija City Stadium; Attendance: 352; Referee: Oscar Johnson (Sweden)

14 October 2025 European Championship qualification	Hungary	1–1	Turkey	Budapest
18:00	Vancsa 14'	Report	Kılıçsoy 6'	Stadium: Hidegkuti Nándor Stadion; Attendance: 1,713; Referee: Jasper Vergoote (Belgium)

13 November 2025 Friendly	Hungary	3–0	Faroe Islands	Budapest
15:15	Lisztes 49'; T. Szűcs 69'; G. Bodnár 84'	Report		Stadium: Hidegkuti Nándor Stadion; Attendance: 300; Referee: Pavle Ilić (Serbia)

18 November 2025 European Championship qualification	Hungary	0–2	Croatia	Budapest
20:00	T. Szűcs (yellow card) 69'	Report	Grgić 17' (yellow card) 90+3'; Šotiček (yellow card) 38'; Barišić (yellow card) 69'; Tunjić 90'	Stadium: Hidegkuti Nándor Stadion; Attendance: 800; Referee: Joey Kooij (Netherlands)
Note: • Hungary: Pécsi — B. Farkas, Yaakobishvili, Fenyő, Markgráf — Tuboly (c) — Á. Molnár (P. Kovács (substituted on) 79'), K. Horváth (Átrok (substituted on) 46'), T. Szűcs, Bánáti (Jurek (substituted on) 46') — V. Dénes (Vajda (substituted on) 69') • Head coach: Szélesi

26 March 2026 Friendly	Hungary	0–1	Israel	Felcsút
19:30	V. Dénes (yellow card) 43'	Report	Binyamin 34'; Koren (yellow card) 90+4'	Stadium: Pancho Aréna; Attendance: 500; Referee: David Šmajc (Slovenia)
Note: • Hungary: Pécsi — Ba. Bíró (Bodnár (substituted on) 46'), Yaakobishvili, Á. Dragóner, P. Kovács (Vajda (substituted on) 46') – R. Tóth (Manner (substituted on) 74'), Tuboly (c) (Á. Molnár (substituted on) 85'), Fenyő (Átrok (substituted on) 60') – V. Dénes (K. Horváth (substituted on) 60'), Gruber (Klausz (substituted on) 74'), Vancsa (Bánáti (substituted on) 60') • Head coach: A. Németh

31 March 2026 European Championship qualification	Hungary	1–2	Ukraine	Budapest
16:30	Vajda (yellow card) 19'; Bodnár (yellow card) 55'; Á. Dragóner (yellow card) 87'; V. Dénes 90+5'	Report	Pyshchur 26'; Synchuk 68'; Varfolomieiev (yellow card) 79'	Stadium: Hidegkuti Nándor Stadion; Attendance: 250; Referee: Jakob Semler (Austria)
Note: • Hungary: Pécsi — Bodnár (Ba. Bíró (substituted on) 63'), Yaakobishvili, Á. Dragóner, Vajda — R. Tóth, Gruber, Tuboly (c) (Fenyő (substituted on) 73') — Bánáti (Á. Molnár (substituted on) 73'), Klausz (K. Horváth (substituted on) 63'), Vancsa (V. Dénes (substituted on) 43') • Head coach: A. Németh

=== Hungary men's under-19 national football team ===
==== 2025 UEFA European Under-19 Championship ====
Elite round

Team 1	Score	Team 2
Hungary	1–3	Austria
Denmark	1–0	Hungary
Iceland	0–1	Hungary

Pos	Team	Pld	W	D	L	GF	GA	GD	Pts	Promotion
1	Denmark	3	3	0	0	5	1	+4	9	Qualified for the final tournament
2	Austria	3	2	0	1	7	4	+3	6	
3	Hungary (H)	3	1	0	2	2	4	−2	3	
4	Iceland	3	0	0	3	1	6	−5	0	

Source: UEFA
Rules for classification: Qualification tiebreakers
(H) Hosts

==== 2026 UEFA European Under-19 Championship ====
Team 1	Score	Team 2
Bulgaria	1–1	Hungary
Hungary	3–0	Faroe Islands
Hungary	1–2	France

Pos	Team	Pld	W	D	L	GF	GA	GD	Pts	Qualification
1	France	3	3	0	0	8	2	+6	9	Elite round
2	Hungary (H)	3	1	1	1	5	3	+2	4	Elite round
3	Bulgaria	3	1	1	1	5	3	+2	4	Advance to Elite round if ranked best third-placed team
4	Faroe Islands	3	0	0	3	0	10	−10	0	

Updated to match(es) played on 18 November 2025. Source: UEFA
Rules for classification: Tiebreakers
(H) Hosts

===== Elite round =====
The draw for the Elite round was held on 10 December 2025 at 11:00 CET at the UEFA headquarters in Nyon, Switzerland. The group stage will be held in Italy in March 2026. The team that finishes first in the group will qualify for the 2026 UEFA European Under-19 Championship in Wales.

Group 6

Team 1	Score	Team 2
Italy	3–0	Hungary
Turkey	3–2	Hungary
Slovakia	2–4	Hungary

Pos	Team	Pld	W	D	L	GF	GA	GD	Pts	Qualification
1	Italy (H)	3	2	1	0	7	1	+6	7	Final tournament
2	Turkey	3	2	1	0	5	3	+2	7	
3	Hungary	3	1	0	2	6	8	−2	3	
4	Slovakia	3	0	0	3	2	8	−6	0	

Source: UEFA
Rules for classification: Tiebreakers
(H) Hosts

==== Friendly ====
Team 1	Score	Team 2
Portugal	3–1	Hungary
Serbia	3–1	Hungary
Montenegro	1–2	Hungary
Hungary	1–0	Greece
Hungary	0–4	Greece

===== Matches =====
19 March 2025 2025 U19 EC qual.	Hungary	1–3	Austria	Balmazújváros
16:00	Szabó 37'	Report	Adejenughure 2', 17'; Grgic 14'	Stadium: Balmazújvárosi Városi Sportpálya; Referee: Snir Levy (Israel)

22 March 2025 2025 U19 EC qual.	Denmark	1–0	Hungary	Nyíregyháza
15:00	Gogorza 66'	Report		Stadium: Városi Stadion; Referee: Pavle Ilić (Serbia)

25 March 2025 2025 U19 EC qual.	Iceland	0–1	Hungary	Balmazújváros
15:00		Report	Mondovics 62'	Stadium: Balmazújvárosi Városi Sportpálya; Referee: Pavle Ilić (Serbia)

4 September 2025 Friendly	Portugal	3–1	Hungary	Senta, Serbia
	G. Silva (yellow card) 31'; Gonçalves 45', 59'; R. Silva (yellow card) 60'; Daiber (yellow card) 88'; Blopa 90+3'	Report	Kugyela (yellow card) 10'; Bolgár (yellow card) 22'; Somogyi 84'
Note: Vilotić Cup

6 September 2025 Friendly	Serbia	3–1	Hungary	Subotica, Serbia
17:00	Zarić 10'; Novičić (yellow card) 34'; Kostić 49'; Milosavljević (yellow card) 80'; Ranković 89'; Petrović (yellow card) 90'	Report	Szép 16'; Barkóczi (yellow card) 41'; V. Vitályos (yellow card) 84'; B. Kovács (yellow card) 90'
Note: Vilotić Cup

9 September 2025 Friendly	Montenegro	1–2	Hungary	Topola, Serbia
	Jovanović 45+1'	Report	B. Kovács 60'; Somogyi 90+1'
Note: Vilotić Cup

9 October 2025 Friendly	Hungary	1–0	Greece	Budapest
13:30	B. Kovács 41'	Report		Stadium: Szilágyi úti Sporttelep

12 October 2025 Friendly	Hungary	0–4	Greece	Budapest
15:00		Report	Szakos 15' (o.g.); Charoupas 22'; Bataoulas 84'; Karargyris 88'	Stadium: Budapest Honvéd Academy

12 November 2025 2026 U19 EC qual.	Bulgaria	1–1	Hungary	Győr
17:00	Boychev 19'; Dimitrov (yellow card) 25'; Boychev (yellow card) 56'; Penev (yellow card) 58'	Report	Pál (yellow card) 13' (goal) 54'; Á. Madarász (yellow card) 27'; T. Horváth (yellow card) 72'; Szép (yellow card) 77'; Bodnar (yellow card) 90'	Stadium: Gyirmóti Stadion; Attendance: 200; Referee: Matthew MacDermid (Scotland)
Note: • Hungary: Bozó — N. Lakatos, Pál, Mona, Bolgár (T. Horváth (substituted on) 66') – Á. Madarász, H. Németh – Egri (Szép (substituted on) 66'), Mondovics (Bodnar (substituted on) 82'), Barkóczi (Kugyela (substituted on) 66') – B. Kovács • Head coach: Szabolcs Kemenes

15 November 2025 2026 U19 EC qual.	Hungary	3–0	Faroe Islands	Győr
18:00	H. Németh 32'; B. Kovács 43' (pen.); Bodnar 90+3'	Report	Brandsson (yellow card) 43'; Lídarenda (yellow card) 80'	Stadium: Gyirmóti Stadion; Attendance: 145; Referee: João Gonçalves (Portugal)
Note: • Hungary: Bozó — Hős, Pál, Somogyi, T. Horváth (Bolgár (substituted on) 60') — H. Németh (Tercza (substituted on) 75'), Décsy — Kugyela (Egri (substituted on) 75'), Szép, Mondovics (Barkóczi (substituted on) 84') — B. Kovács (Bodnar (substituted on) 60') • Head coach: Kemenes

18 November 2025 2026 U19 EC qual.	Hungary	1–2	France	Győr
17:30	H. Németh 57'	Report	Merah 22'; Muzungu (yellow card) 32'; El Jamali 39'	Stadium: Gyirmóti Stadion; Attendance: 200; Referee: Miloš Milanović (Serbia)
Note: • Hungary: Bozó — Tercza, Pál, Mona, N. Lakatos (T. Horváth (substituted on) 83') — Somogyi, Á. Madarász (Décsy (substituted on) 58') – Bodnar, H. Németh, Szép – B. Kovács • Head coach: Kemenes

25 March 2026 2026 U19 EC q. Elite Round	Italy	3–0	Hungary	Catanzaro, Italy
17:00 CET	Sala (yellow card) 39'; Iddrissou 44', 78'; Idele (yellow card) 74'; Comotto 85'	Report	B. Kovács (yellow card) 27'; Pál (yellow card) 89'	Stadium: Stadio Nicola Ceravolo; Referee: Bastien Dechepy (France)
Note: • Hungary: Bozó — Szakos, Pál, V. Vitályos, Tercza (Giani (substituted on) 60') — Somogyi (Á. Madarász (substituted on) 83'), Décsy (Mondovics (substituted on) 68') — Bodnar (Szép (substituted on) 83'), H. Németh, Kugyela — B. Kovács (c) • Head coach: Balázs Dr. Veress

28 March 2026 2026 U19 EC q. Elite Round	Turkey	3–2	Hungary	Cosenza, Italy
12:00 CET	Luş 4', 33' (yellow card) 19'; Atsup (yellow card) 31'; Yaşar 41'	Report	Mondovics 51'; Hős (yellow card) 59'; B. Kovács (yellow card) 76' (goal) 90+3'	Stadium: Real Cosenza; Referee: Bastien Dechepy (France)
Note: • Hungary: Bozó — Szakos, Mona (Somogyi (substituted on) 46'), V. Vitályos, Kugyela — Hős (Décsy (substituted on) 61'), Á. Madarász (Szép (substituted on) 83') — Bodnar (Egri (substituted on) 67'), H. Németh, Mondovics — B. Kovács (c) • Caretaker coach: Balázs Dr. Veress

31 March 2026 2026 U19 EC q. Elite Round	Slovakia	2–4	Hungary	Cosenza, Italy
15:00 CEST	Blaško 6'; Kováčik (yellow card) 68' (goal) 86'	Report	Mondovics 13', 62'; Décsy (yellow card) 54'; Bodnar 56'; Szép 74'	Stadium: Real Cosenza; Referee: Gustavo Correia (Portugal)
Note: • Hungary: Bozó — Tercza, Pál (c), V. Vitályos, Kugyela — Décsy, H. Németh — Egri, Szép, Mondovics — Bodnar • Caretaker coach: Balázs Dr. Veress

=== Hungary women's national football team ===
==== UEFA Women's Nations League ====
Group B3

Team 1	Score	Team 2
Belarus	0–2	Hungary
Hungary	0–1	Finland
Hungary	0–1	Serbia
Finland	3–0	Hungary
Serbia	1–0	Hungary
Hungary	0–0	Belarus

Hungary relegation to League C.

Pos	Team	Pld	W	D	L	GF	GA	GD	Pts	Promotion, qualification or relegation	(Serbia)	(Finland)	(Hungary)	(Belarus)
1	Serbia (P)	6	4	2	0	7	1	+6	14	Promotion to League A	—	1–0	1–0	0–0
2	Finland	6	3	2	1	8	2	+6	11	Qualification for promotion play-offs	1–1	—	3–0	0–0
3	Hungary (R)	6	1	1	4	2	6	−4	4	Relegation to League C	0–1	0–1	—	0–0
4	Belarus (R)	6	0	3	3	0	8	−8	3	Relegation to League C	0–3	0–3	0–2	—

Source: UEFA
Rules for classification: Tiebreakers
(P) Promoted; (R) Relegated

==== Friendly matches ====
Team 1	Score	Team 2
Hungary	4–0	Luxembourg
Slovakia	0–1	Hungary
Republic of Ireland	3–2	Hungary

==== 2027 FIFA Women's World Cup qualification ====
Group C3

Team 1	Score	Team 2
Andorra	0–0	Hungary
Hungary	1–0	Azerbaijan
North Macedonia	0–5	Hungary
Hungary	7–0	North Macedonia
Azerbaijan	1–2	Hungary
Hungary	6–1	Andorra

Pos	Team	Pld	W	D	L	GF	GA	GD	Pts	Promotion or qualification	(Hungary)	(Azerbaijan)	(North Macedonia)	(Andorra)
1	Hungary (P)	6	5	1	0	21	2	+19	16	Advance to play-offs and promotion to League B	—	1–0	7–0	6–1
2	Azerbaijan	6	4	0	2	11	5	+6	12		1–2	—	2–0	2–0
3	North Macedonia	6	2	0	4	5	17	−12	6		0–5	1–3	—	3–0
4	Andorra	6	0	1	5	2	15	−13	1		0–0	1–3	0–1	—

Source: UEFA
Rules for classification: Tiebreakers
(P) Promoted

==== Matches ====
21 February 2025 Nations League	Belarus	0–2	Hungary	Loznica, Serbia (Note: Due to the Belarusian involvement in the Russian invasion of Ukraine, Belarus are required to play their home matches at neutral venues, and behind closed doors, until further notice.)
20:00		Report	Csiki 57'; Csányi 78'	Stadium: Lagator Stadium; Attendance: 0 Referee: Sandra Bastos (Portugal)

25 February 2025 Nations League	Hungary	0–1	Finland	Budapest, Hungary
18:00		Report	Nyström 7' (pen.)	Stadium: Hidegkuti Nándor Stadion; Attendance: 1,213; Referee: Hristiyana Guteva (Bulgaria)

4 April 2025 Nations League	Hungary	0–1	Serbia	Győr, Hungary
20:00		Report	Matejić 69'	Stadium: Ménfői úti Stadion; Attendance: 513; Referee: Caroline Lanssens (Belgium)

8 April 2025 Nations League	Finland	3–0	Hungary	Tampere, Finland
17:30	Koivisto 18'; Sällström 39'; Franssi 88'	Report		Stadium: Tammelan Stadion; Attendance: 4,135; Referee: Angelika Söder (Germany)

30 May 2025 Nations League	Serbia	1–0	Hungary	Stara Pazova, Serbia
19:00	Poljak 90+6'	Report		Stadium: Serbian FA Sports Center; Attendance: 300; Referee: Kirsty Dowle (England)

3 June 2025 Nations League	Hungary	0–0	Belarus	Szeged, Hungary
19:00		Report		Stadium: Szent Gellért Fórum; Attendance: 1,613; Referee: Ana Maria Terteleac (Romania)

24 October 2025 Friendly	Hungary	4–0	Luxembourg	Budapest, Hungary
18:00	Mayer 29'; Pusztai 30'; Kaján 65'; Csiszár 75'	Report		Stadium: Hidegkuti Nándor Stadion

28 October 2025 Friendly	Slovakia	0–1	Hungary	Senec, Slovakia
17:00		Report	V. Szabó 9'	Stadium: Národné Tréningové Centrum

29 November 2025 Friendly	Republic of Ireland	3–2	Hungary	Marbella, Spain
12:30	Larkin 8'; Carusa 18'; D. O'Sullivan 53'; Finn (yellow card) 79'	Report	Vincze 27'; Kaján 89'
Note: • Player of the match: Abbie Larkin, Rep. of Ireland 8.1 • Best player of Hungary: Zsanett Kaján 7.9

3 March 2026 World Cup qualification	Andorra	0–0	Hungary	Andorra la Vella, Andorra
19:00	Vendrell (yellow card) 73'; Sabio (yellow card) 90+2'; Da Cruz (yellow card) 90+5'	Report (FIFA); Report (UEFA)		Stadium: Estadi Nacional; Referee: Roxana Recorean (Romania)
Note:

7 March 2026 World Cup qualification	Hungary	1–0	Azerbaijan	Felcsút, Hungary
14:30	Pápai 45+1'	Report (FIFA); Report (UEFA)	Ahmadova (yellow card) 39'; Seyfatdinova (yellow card) 67'	Stadium: Pancho Aréna; Referee: Filipa Pereira Cunha (Portugal)
Note: • Hungary: Brzykcy — Va. Nagy, F. Nagy, Savanya, Palakovics — Pusztai, Csiszár, Csányi (Csiki (substituted on) 59') — Mayer, Pápai (Pulins (substituted on) 79'), Vincze (Kaján (substituted on) 79')

14 April 2026 World Cup qualification	North Macedonia	0–5	Hungary	Bitola, North Macedonia
16:00	E. Paneska (yellow card) 30'; Mustafa (yellow card) 43'	Report (FIFA); Report (UEFA)	Csányi 2', 9', 20'; Savanya 45+1'; Csiki 88'	Stadium: Petar Miloševski Football Stadium; Referee: Davina Lutz (Germany)
Note: • Hungary: Brzykcy — Va. Nagy, H. Németh (L. Kovács (substituted on) 46'), Savanya, Palakovics — Csiki, Csiszár (Fenyvesi (substituted on) 68'), Csányi (Pusztai (substituted on) 59') — Mayer (Vir. Nagy (substituted on) 59'), Pápai, Kaján

18 April 2026 World Cup qualification	Hungary	7–0	North Macedonia	Felcsút, Hungary
15:00	Mayer 21', 51'; Paneva 35' (o.g.); Pápai 47'; Kaján (penalty missed) '63 68'; Va. Nagy 85'; Savanya 90+3'	Report (FIFA); Report (UEFA)	Maksuti (yellow card) 5'; Mustafa (yellow card) 16'; E. Paneska (yellow card) 38'; Markovska (yellow card) 49'; Petkova (yellow card) 62'	Stadium: Pancho Aréna; Referee: Paola Cebollada López (Spain)
Note: • Hungary: Brzykcy — Vik. Nagy, L. Kovács, Savanya, Palakovics (Pataki (substituted on) 72') — Csiki (Pusztai (substituted on) 59'), Csiszár (c), Csányi — Mayer (F. Nagy (substituted on) 72'), Pápai (Va. Nagy (substituted on) 59'), Kaján (Vir. Nagy (substituted on) 82')

5 June 2026 World Cup qualification	Azerbaijan	1–2	Hungary	Sumgayit, Azerbaijan
16:00 CEST (18:00 AZT (UTC+04:00))	Asadova 74'; Acar 78'; Jafarzade (yellow card) 86'	Report (FIFA); Report (UEFA)	Csányi 12'; Va. Nagy 85'	Stadium: Mehdi Huseynzade Stadium; Referee: Vanja Janković (Slovenian)
Note: • Hungary: Brzykcy — Vik. Nagy, Fördős, Savanya, Palakovics — Csányi, Csiszár (c), Pusztai (Fenyvesi (substituted on) 82') — Zeller (Kaján (substituted on) 67'), Pápai (Va. Nagy (substituted on) 82'), Vincze (Vir. Nagy (substituted on) 90')

9 June 2026 World Cup qualification	Hungary	6–1	Andorra	Budapest, Hungary
19:00 CEST	Vik. Nagy 3'; Kaján 39'; Va. Nagy 41'; Fenyvesi 57', 69'; Pusztai 90'	Report (FIFA); Report (UEFA)	Da Cruz 55'	Stadium: Illovszky Rudolf Stadion; Attendance: 5,054; Referee: Melek Dakan (Turkish)
Note: • Hungary: Bíró — Vir. Nagy, L. Kovács, Savanya, Palakovics — Fenyvesi, Csiszár (c) (Pusztai (substituted on) 62'), Csiki (Csányi (substituted on) 62') — Vik. Nagy (Vincze (substituted on) 46'), Va. Nagy (Pápai (substituted on) 62'), Kaján (Zeller (substituted on) 79')

== UEFA competitions ==
=== UEFA Champions League ===
Participating club: Ferencváros as of winners of the 2024–25 Nemzeti Bajnokság I (domestic league).

==== Second qualifying round ====
Team 1	Agg.	Team 2	1st leg	2nd leg
Noah (Armenia)	4–6	(Hungary) Ferencváros	1–2	3–4

==== Third qualifying round ====
Team 1	Agg.	Team 2	1st leg	2nd leg
Ludogorets (Bulgaria)	0–3	(Hungary) Ferencváros	0–0	0–3

==== Play-off round ====
Team 1	Agg.	Team 2	1st leg	2nd leg
Ferencváros (Hungary)	4–5	(Azerbaijan) Qarabağ	1–3	3–2

Qarabağ won 5–4 on aggregate. Ferencváros could continue in the UEFA Conference League – League phase.

=== UEFA Europa League ===
Participating clubs: in the Qualifying rounds Paks as winners of the 2024–25 Magyar Kupa (domestic cup) and in the League phase Ferencváros as loser of the 2025–26 UEFA Champions League qualifying – Play-off round.

==== Qualifying rounds ====
===== First qualifying round =====
Team 1	Agg.	Team 2	1st leg	2nd leg
Paks (Hungary)	0–3	(Romania) CFR Cluj	0–0	0–3

Paks could continue in the UEFA Conference League.

==== League phase ====
Team 1	Score	Team 2
Ferencváros (Hungary)	1–1	(Czech Republic) Viktoria Plzeň
Genk (Belgium)	0–1	(Hungary) Ferencváros
Red Bull Salzburg (Austria)	2–3	(Hungary) Ferencváros
Ferencváros (Hungary)	3–1	(Bulgaria) Ludogorets Razgrad
Fenerbahçe (Turkey)	1–1	(Hungary) Ferencváros
Ferencváros (Hungary)	2–1	(Scotland) Rangers
Ferencváros (Hungary)	1–1	(Greece) Panathinaikos
Nottingham Forest (England)	4–0	(Hungary) Ferencváros

Pos	Team	Pld	W	D	L	GF	GA	GD	Pts	Qualification
10	(Italian Football Federation) Bologna	8	4	3	1	14	7	+7	15	Advance to knockout phase play-offs (seeded)
11	(German Football Association) VfB Stuttgart	8	5	0	3	15	9	+6	15	Advance to knockout phase play-offs (seeded)
12	(Hungarian Football Federation) Ferencváros	8	4	3	1	12	11	+1	15	Advance to knockout phase play-offs (seeded)
13	(The Football Association) Nottingham Forest	8	4	2	2	15	7	+8	14	Advance to knockout phase play-offs (seeded)
14	(Football Association of the Czech Republic) Viktoria Plzeň	8	3	5	0	8	3	+5	14	Advance to knockout phase play-offs (seeded)

Source: UEFA
Rules for classification: League phase tiebreakers

==== Knockout phase ====
===== Play-off =====
Team 1	Agg.	Team 2	1st leg	2nd leg
Ludogorets (Bulgaria)	2–3	(Hungary) Ferencváros	2–1	0–2

===== Round of 16 =====
Team 1	Agg.	Team 2	1st leg	2nd leg
Ferencváros (Hungary)	2–4	(Portugal) Braga	2–0	0–4

=== UEFA Conference League ===
Participating clubs: Puskás Akadémia as of 2nd place and Győr as of 4th place in 2024–25 Nemzeti Bajnokság I (domestic league).

==== Qualifying rounds ====
===== Second qualifying round =====
Team 1	Agg.	Team 2	1st leg	2nd leg
Aris Limassol (Cyprus)	5–2	(Hungary) Puskás Akadémia	3–2	2–0
Pyunik (Armenia)	3–4	(Hungary) Győr	2–1	1–3
Paks (Hungary)	2–1	(Slovenia) Maribor	1–0	1–1

===== Third qualifying round =====
Team 1	Agg.	Team 2	1st leg	2nd leg
AIK (Sweden)	2–3	(Hungary) Győr	2–1	0–2
Polissya Zhytomyr (Ukraine)	4–2	(Hungary) Paks	3–0	1–2

===== Play-off round =====
Team 1	Agg.	Team 2	1st leg	2nd leg
Győr (Hungary)	2–3	(Austria) Rapid Wien	2–1	0–2

=== UEFA Women's Champions League ===
==== Qualifying rounds ====
===== Second qualifying round =====
====== Semi-finals ======
Team 1	Score	Team 2
Ferencváros (Hungary)	3–0	(Luxembourg) Racing Union

27 August 2025
10:00

Ferencváros (Hungary)	3–0	(Luxembourg) Racing Union
Garcia 35'; Wojdyla 42' (o.g.); Va. Nagy 47'	Report

Loro Boriçi Stadium, Shkodër
Attendance: 50
Referee: Tatyana Sorokopudova (Kazakhstan)

====== Final ======
Team 1	Score	Team 2
Ferencváros (Hungary)	4–0	(Belarus) Dinamo Minsk

30 August 2025
19:00

Ferencváros (Hungary)	4–0	(Belarus) Dinamo Minsk
Garcia 3'; Va. Nagy 14', 45+1' (pen.); Kubassova 78'	Report

Loro Boriçi Stadium, Shkodër
Attendance: 50
Referee: Deborah Anex (Switzerland)

===== Third qualifying round =====
Team 1	Agg.	Team 2	1st leg	2nd leg
Vålerenga (Norway)	5–1	(Hungary) Ferencváros	3–0	2–1

11 September 2025
19:00

Vålerenga (Norway)	3–0	(Hungary) Ferencváros
Sævik 52'; Kovacs 66'; Hørte 90+4'	Report

Intility Arena, Oslo
Attendance: 502
Referee: Miriama Bočková (Slovakia)
18 September 2025
16:00

Ferencváros (Hungary)	1–2	(Norway) Vålerenga
Vi. Nagy 22'	Report	Thorsnes 11' (pen.), 16'

Hévízi úti Stadion, Budapest
Attendance: 579
Referee: Iuliana Demetrescu (Romania)

Vålerenga won 5–1 on aggregate. Ferencváros could continue in UEFA Women's Europa Cup.

=== UEFA Women's Europa Cup ===
==== Second qualifying round ====
Team 1	Agg.	Team 2	1st leg	2nd leg
Sparta Prague (Czech Republic)	5–0	(Hungary) Ferencváros	0–0	5–0

8 October 2025
19:00

Sparta Prague (Czech Republic)	0–0	(Hungary) Ferencváros
Černá (yellow card) 35'; Retkesová (yellow card) 73'; Bergford (yellow card) 75'; Sonntagová (yellow card) 76'	Report	Hanász (yellow card) 15'; Czellér (yellow card) 29'; E. Kovács (yellow card) 85'

Stadion Letná, Prague
Referee: Caroline Lanssens (Belgium)
16 October 2025
14:00

Ferencváros (Hungary)	0–5	(Czech Republic) Sparta Prague
E. Kovács (yellow card) 90+5'	Report	Bergford 7'; Černá 19' (yellow card) 33'; Bartoňová 47'; Frajtović 58' (o.g.); Huvarová 83'

Hévízi úti Stadion, Budapest
Referee: Merima Čelik (Bosnia and Herzegovina)

Sparta Prague won 5–0 on aggregate.

=== UEFA Youth League ===
==== Domestic Champions Path ====
===== Second qualifying round =====
Team 1	Agg.	Team 2	1st leg	2nd leg
Brann (Norway)	1–1 (1–3 p)	(Hungary) Puskás Akadémia	1–1	0–0

22 October 2025
18:00

Brann (Norway)	1–1	(Hungary) Puskás Akadémia
Lægreid 33'	Report	Gustei 54'

Åsane Arena, Bergen
Attendance: 314
Referee: Ross Hardie (Scotland)
5 November 2025
16:30

Puskás Akadémia (Hungary)	0–0	(Norway) Brann
	Report
Penalties
Umathum (penalty missed); Krupa (penalty scored); O. Tóth (penalty scored); Pál (penalty scored)	3–1	(penalty missed) Haga; (penalty scored) Eikrem; (penalty missed) Vindenes; (penalty missed) Børtveit

Pancho Aréna, Felcsút
Attendance: 670
Referee: Giorgi Avazashvili (Georgia)

1–1 on aggregate; Puskás Akadémia won 3–1 on penalties.

===== Third qualifying round =====
Team 1	Agg.	Team 2	1st leg	2nd leg
FCSB (Romania)	4–4 (2–4 p)	(Hungary) Puskás Akadémia	1–2	3–2

FCSB (Romania)	1–2	(Hungary) Puskás Akadémia
Stoian 49'	Report	Varga 58'; Krupa 72'

Football Centre FRF, Buftea
Attendance: 300
Referee: Ilioski Vlatko (North Macedonia)
10 December 2025

Puskás Akadémia (Hungary)	2–3	(Romania) FCSB
Ásványi 4'; Zahorán 17'	Report	Popa 1', 28'; Panait 11'
Penalties
Pál (penalty missed); Magyarics (penalty scored); Varga (penalty scored); O. Tóth (penalty scored); Ásványi (penalty scored)	4–2	(penalty scored) Stoian; (penalty missed) Ilie; (penalty scored) Manolache; (penalty missed) Necşulescu

Pancho Aréna, Felcsút
Attendance: 1,022
Referee: Mervan Bejtullahu (Kosovo)

4–4 on aggregate; Puskás Akadémia won 4–2 on penalties.

===== Knockout phase =====
The top 22 teams from the UEFA Champions League Path as well as 10 winners of the Domestic Champions Path qualified for the knockout phase, which will be played in a single-leg knockout format. For the round of 32, the top six teams from the UEFA Champions League Path will be paired against the teams finished in 17th to 22nd place, and the Domestic Champions Path winners will be paired against teams ranked 7th to 16th.

Round of 32

Team 1	Score	Team 2
Puskás Akadémia (Hungary)	1–2	(Portugal) Sporting CP

4 February 2026
15:30

Puskás Akadémia (Hungary)	1–2	(Portugal) Sporting CP
Budai 66'	Report	Gonçalves 53'; Lopes 90+4'

Pancho Aréna, Felcsút
Attendance: 650
Referee: Lukasz Kuzma (Poland)

== League competitions (Men's) ==
League Division	Promoted to league	Relegated from league
Nemzeti Bajnokság I	Kazincbarcika ▲; Kisvárda ▲	Diósgyőr ▼; Kazincbarcika ▼
Nemzeti Bajnokság II	Tiszakécske ▲; Karcag ▲	Budafok ▼; Békéscsaba ▼
Nemzeti Bajnokság III; Group Northeast (Észak-Kelet)	Gödöllő ▲ from MB I – Pest county; Ózd-Sajóvölgye ▲ from MB I – Borsod-Abaúj-Zemplén county; Tarpa ▲ from MB I – Szabolcs-Szatmár-Bereg county	Ózd-Sajóvölgye ▼; Sényő ▼; Hatvan ▼
Nemzeti Bajnokság III; Group Northwest (Észak-Nyugat)	Gyirmót ▼ from NB II; Tatabánya ▼ from NB II; Pápai Perutz ▲ from MB I – Veszprém county; Zsámbék ▲ from MB I – Komárom-Esztergom county	Pápa ▼; Balatonfüred ▼; Zsámbék ▼
Nemzeti Bajnokság III; Group Southwest (Dél-Nyugat)	Balatonlelle ▲ from MB I – Somogy county; Dombóvár ▲ from MB I – Tolna county; Dunaújváros ▲ from MB I – Fejér county; Érd from NB III – Northwest (Észak-Nyugat); Pénzügyőr from NB III – Southeast (Dél-Kelet)	PTE-PEAC ▼; Balatonlelle ▼; Pénzügyőr ▼; Dombóvár ▼
Nemzeti Bajnokság III; Group Southeast (Dél-Kelet)	Békéscsaba II ▲ from MB I – Békés county; Szeged II ▲ from MB I – Csongrád-Csanád county; III. Kerületi TVE from NB III – Northwest (Észak-Nyugat); Dunaharaszti from NB III – Southwest (Dél-Nyugat)	Szeged GA II ▼; Békéscsaba II ▼; Martfű ▼; Tiszaföldvár ▼

=== Nemzeti Bajnokság I (Tier 1) ===
Winners: Győri ETO (5th title)

==== League table ====
Pos	Team	Pld	W	D	L	GF	GA	GD	Pts	Qualification or relegation
1	Győr (C)	33	20	9	4	65	30	+35	69	Qualification for the Champions League first qualifying round
2	Ferencváros	33	21	5	7	67	31	+36	68	Qualification for the Europa League first qualifying round (Note: The 2025–26 Magyar Kupa winners (Ferencváros) qualify for the Europa League first qualifying round.)
3	Paks	33	15	8	10	63	46	+17	53	Qualification for the Conference League second qualifying round
4	Debrecen	33	14	11	8	51	41	+10	53	Qualification for the Conference League second qualifying round
5	Zalaegerszeg	33	13	9	11	49	43	+6	48	
6	Puskás Akadémia	33	13	7	13	43	43	0	46	
7	Újpest	33	11	7	15	48	57	−9	40	
8	Kisvárda	33	11	7	15	36	49	−13	40	
9	Nyíregyháza	33	10	10	13	47	57	−10	40	
10	MTK	33	9	11	13	55	62	−7	38	
11	Diósgyőr (R)	33	6	10	17	39	65	−26	28	Relegation to the Nemzeti Bajnokság II
12	Kazincbarcika (R)	33	6	4	23	31	70	−39	22	Relegation to the Nemzeti Bajnokság II

Source: Hungarian Football Federation (in Hungarian)
Rules for classification: 1) Points; 2) Matches won; 3) Goal difference; 4) Goals scored; 5) Head-to-head points; 6) Head-to-head goal difference; 7) Fair play ranking; 8) Drawing of lots.
(C) Champions; (R) Relegated

=== Nemzeti Bajnokság II (Tier 2) ===
==== League table ====
Pos	Team	Pld	W	D	L	GF	GA	GD	Pts	Promotion or relegation
1	Vasas (C, P)	30	20	4	6	59	26	+33	64	Promotion to Nemzeti Bajnokság I
2	Honvéd (P)	30	18	5	7	49	25	+24	59	Promotion to Nemzeti Bajnokság I
3	Kecskemét	30	16	3	11	49	39	+10	51	
4	Kozármisleny	30	13	9	8	38	40	−2	48	
5	Mezőkövesd	30	13	7	10	37	34	+3	46	
6	Csákvár	30	12	10	8	43	37	+6	46	
7	BVSC	30	12	5	13	36	30	+6	41	
8	Videoton	30	10	9	11	37	33	+4	39	
9	Szeged	30	9	9	12	29	34	−5	36	
10	Tiszakécske	30	10	9	11	37	44	−7	35 (Note: Tiszakécske were deducted four points due to fielding an illegal player during their match on 2 February 2026 versus Soroksár.)	
11	Karcag	30	9	8	13	29	41	−12	35	
12	Ajka	30	10	3	17	23	40	−17	33	
13	Soroksár	30	8	9	13	41	45	−4	33	
14	Szentlőrinc	30	7	12	11	35	42	−7	33	
15	Budafok (R)	30	7	8	15	33	49	−16	29	Relegation to Nemzeti Bajnokság III
16	Békéscsaba (R)	30	6	10	14	27	42	−15	28	Relegation to Nemzeti Bajnokság III

Source: Hungarian Football Federation (in Hungarian), Soccerway
Rules for classification: 1) Points; 2) Matches won; 3) Goal difference; 4) Goals scored; 5) Head-to-head points; 6) Head-to-head goal difference; 7) Fair play ranking; 8) Drawing of lots.
(C) Champions; (P) Promoted; (R) Relegated

=== Nemzeti Bajnokság III (Tier 3) ===
==== League tables ====
Pos	Team	Pld	W	D	L	GF	GA	GD	Pts	Promotion or relegation
1	Gyirmót (C, Q)	30	27	1	2	106	20	+86	82	Qualification to promotion play-offs
2	Tatabánya	30	20	2	8	64	37	+27	62	
3	Dorog	30	18	4	8	49	34	+15	58	
4	Puskás Akadémia II	30	17	3	10	58	37	+21	54	
5	Komárom	30	15	6	9	59	45	+14	51	
6	Szombathelyi Haladás	30	15	6	9	43	32	+11	51	
7	Mosonmagyaróvár	30	14	5	11	48	33	+15	47	
8	Veszprém	30	12	8	10	36	37	−1	44	
9	Budaörs	30	12	5	13	53	51	+2	41	
10	Bicske	30	10	6	14	50	51	−1	36	
11	Győri ETO II	30	10	4	16	47	63	−16	34	
12	Újpest II	30	9	7	14	46	50	−4	34	
13	Sopron	30	9	7	14	43	58	−15	34	
14	Pápa (R)	30	6	4	20	43	83	−40	22	Relegation to Megyei Bajnokság I
15	Balatonfüred (R)	30	4	6	20	20	62	−42	18	Relegation to Megyei Bajnokság I
16	Zsámbék (R)	30	3	4	23	35	107	−72	13	Relegation to Megyei Bajnokság I

Updated to match(es) played on 24 May 2026 (complete). Source: Soccerway
Rules for classification: 1) Points; 2) Matches won; 3) Goal difference; 4) Goals scored; 5) Head-to-head points; 6) Head-to-head goal difference; 7) Fair play ranking; 8) Drawing of lots.
(C) Champions; (Q) Qualified for the phase indicated; (R) Relegated

Pos	Team	Pld	W	D	L	GF	GA	GD	Pts	Promotion or relegation
1	Kisvárda II (Note: Kisvárda II won the championship but the club's first team is in Nemzeti Bajnokság I and cannot advance according to the regulations, so the second-place team (Cigánd) can fight for Nemzeti Bajnokság II membership in the promotion play-offs.) (C)	30	20	7	3	60	22	+38	67	
2	Cigánd (Q)	30	18	7	5	66	30	+36	61	Qualification to promotion play-offs
3	Debreceni EAC	30	18	7	5	63	29	+34	61	
4	Tiszafüred	30	16	8	6	61	36	+25	56	
5	Debreceni VSC II	30	16	7	7	66	40	+26	55	
6	Tarpa	30	12	11	7	39	28	+11	47	
7	Gödöllő	30	11	7	12	52	44	+8	40	
8	Diósgyőr II	30	11	5	14	48	58	−10	38	
9	Nyíregyháza Spartacus II	30	11	4	15	65	56	+9	37	
10	Eger	30	11	4	15	46	71	−25	37	
11	Tiszaújváros	30	9	7	14	41	66	−25	34	
12	Putnok	30	9	5	16	44	52	−8	32	
13	Füzesabony	30	7	9	14	25	41	−16	30	
14	Ózd (R)	30	7	8	15	51	68	−17	29	Relegation to Megyei Bajnokság I
15	Sényő (R)	30	7	7	16	32	74	−42	28	Relegation to Megyei Bajnokság I
16	Hatvan (R)	30	5	1	24	37	81	−44	16	Relegation to Megyei Bajnokság I

Updated to match(es) played on 24 May 2026 (complete). Source: Soccerway
Rules for classification: 1) Points; 2) Matches won; 3) Goal difference; 4) Goals scored; 5) Head-to-head points; 6) Head-to-head goal difference; 7) Fair play ranking; 8) Drawing of lots.
(C) Champions; (Q) Qualified for the phase indicated; (R) Relegated
Notes:

Pos	Team	Pld	W	D	L	GF	GA	GD	Pts	Promotion or relegation
1	Nagykanizsa (C, Q)	30	21	6	3	64	27	+37	69	Qualification to promotion play-offs
2	PMFC	30	20	7	3	71	25	+46	67	
3	Kaposvári Rákóczi	30	20	3	7	64	32	+32	63	
4	Ferencváros II	30	17	4	9	63	43	+20	55	
5	Majos	30	17	3	10	78	49	+29	54	
6	MTK Budapest II	30	16	4	10	62	33	+29	52	
7	Érd	30	15	7	8	47	39	+8	52	
8	Dunaújváros	30	13	10	7	58	42	+16	49	
9	Iváncsa	30	11	6	13	49	44	+5	39	
10	Siófok	30	11	5	14	40	55	−15	38	
11	Paksi II	30	10	2	18	42	62	−20	32	
12	Szekszárd	30	9	4	17	43	75	−32	31	
13	PTE-PEAC (R)	30	6	10	14	39	51	−12	28	Relegation to Megyei Bajnokság I
14	Balatonlelle (R)	30	6	6	18	24	53	−29	24	Relegation to Megyei Bajnokság I
15	Pénzügyőr (R)	30	4	8	18	31	61	−30	20	Relegation to Megyei Bajnokság I
16	Dombóvár (R)	30	0	3	27	22	106	−84	3	Relegation to Megyei Bajnokság I

Updated to match(es) played on 24 May 2026 (complete). Source: Soccerway
Rules for classification: 1) Points; 2) Matches won; 3) Goal difference; 4) Goals scored; 5) Head-to-head points; 6) Head-to-head goal difference; 7) Fair play ranking; 8) Drawing of lots.
(C) Champions; (Q) Qualified for the phase indicated; (R) Relegated

Pos	Team	Pld	W	D	L	GF	GA	GD	Pts	Promotion or relegation
1	Monor (C, Q)	30	20	7	3	63	31	+32	67	Qualification to promotion play-offs
2	ESMTK	30	21	3	6	70	24	+46	66	
3	Gyula	30	20	5	5	80	24	+56	65	
4	III. Kerület	30	18	7	5	71	38	+33	61	
5	Vasas II	30	14	11	5	65	40	+25	53	
6	Csepel	30	15	4	11	50	41	+9	49	
7	Dabas	30	12	6	12	47	41	+6	42	
8	Budapest Honvéd II	30	11	9	10	40	39	+1	42	
9	Dunaharaszti	30	11	7	12	46	50	−4	40	
10	Hódmezővásárhely	30	10	7	13	48	56	−8	37	
11	Szegedi VSE	30	10	5	15	46	62	−16	35	
12	BKV Előre	30	9	5	16	50	64	−14	32	
13	Szeged GA II (R)	30	7	8	15	37	53	−16	29	Relegation to Megyei Bajnokság I
14	Békéscsaba II (R)	30	7	5	18	30	61	−31	26	Relegation to Megyei Bajnokság I
15	Martfű (R)	30	6	2	22	26	75	−49	20	Relegation to Megyei Bajnokság I
16	Tiszaföldvár (R)	30	3	1	26	25	95	−70	10	Relegation to Megyei Bajnokság I

Updated to match(es) played on 24 May 2026 (complete). Source: Soccerway
Rules for classification: 1) Points; 2) Matches won; 3) Goal difference; 4) Goals scored; 5) Head-to-head points; 6) Head-to-head goal difference; 7) Fair play ranking; 8) Drawing of lots.
(C) Champions; (Q) Qualified for the phase indicated; (R) Relegated

==== Promotion play-offs for Nemzeti Bajnokság II ====
Two of the qualifying teams of the four groups of Nemzeti Bajnokság III will replace the two teams eliminated from Nemzeti Bajnokság II this year and will start the 2026–27 season in the second division (Nemzeti Bajnokság II). Promotion is decided by a playoff, in which the qualifying teams from the four groups of Nemzeti Bajnokság III (which does not always mean the champion) play a two-round duel to decide which of them advances one division higher, to 2026–27 Nemzeti Bajnokság II.

Team 1	Agg.	Team 2	1st leg	2nd leg
Gyirmót	5–3	Monor	2–2	3–1
Nagykanizsa	4–2	Cigánd	2–2	2–0 (a.e.t.)

Promoted teams to 2026–27 Nemzeti Bajnokság II: Gyirmót and Nagykanizsa.

=== Megyei Bajnokság I (Tier 4) ===
==== Promotion play-offs for Nemzeti Bajnokság III ====
The Hungarian Football Association prepared the pairings – according to the announcement, 20 teams can participate in the draw, 19 county champions and 1 first division of the Budapest championship (BLASZ) fourth division champion. Out of the twenty, eighteen were finally selected, as neither the champion (Mezőörs and Bölcske) nor any of the champions from Győr-Moson-Sopron and Tolna counties agreed to the play-offs. Since the number of teams was reduced by two, two clubs advanced to the third line as powerhouses: luck favored 1908 SZAC Budapest, which won the first division of the Budapest championship, and Gyöngyös, which finished second instead of the gold medalist of Heves county (Lőrinci withdrew from the play-offs).

The first legs will be played on Sunday, June 7th, at 17:30, with the return legs a week later, on June 14th, at 17:00.

Team 1	Agg.	Team 2	1st leg	2nd leg
Nagyatád	1–11	Mátészalka	0–4	1–7
Hajdúnánás	5–2	Balatonalmádi	2–2	3–0
Mohács	2–5	Király	0–2	2–3
Sárisáp	2–7	Zalaegerszeg II	1–3	1–4
Sárbogárd	4–2	Dunavarsány	3–1	1–1
Szarvas	1–7	Sándorfalva	1–3	0–4
Kecskeméti TE II	2–3	Szolnok	1–1	1–2
Salgótarján	4–0	Emőd	4–0	0–0

Promoted teams to 2026–27 Nemzeti Bajnokság III: 1908 SZAC Budapest, Gyöngyös, Mátészalka, Hajdúnánás, Király, Zalaegerszeg II, Sárbogárd, Sándorfalva, Szolnok and Salgótarján.

== League competitions (Women's) ==
=== Simple Női Liga ===
Regular season

==== League table ====
Pos	Team	Pld	W	D	L	GF	GA	GD	Pts	Qualification or relegation
1	Ferencváros-Telekom	22	19	2	1	76	14	+62	59	Qualification for the Final
2	Puskás Akadémia	22	17	3	2	73	15	+58	54	Qualification for the Final
3	MTK Budapest	22	15	3	4	56	19	+37	48	Qualification for the Bronze match
4	Győri ETO	22	14	3	5	57	21	+36	45	Qualification for the Bronze match
5	KÉSZ-St. Mihály-Szeged	22	10	3	9	41	39	+2	33	
6	Újpest	22	9	3	10	36	40	−4	30	
7	Budapest Honvéd	22	7	8	7	39	28	+11	29	
8	Pécsi MFC	22	7	4	11	27	48	−21	25	
9	Diósgyőr	22	6	1	15	28	64	−36	19	
10	Viktoria	22	3	5	14	20	51	−31	14	
11	Szekszárd (R)	22	3	3	16	19	75	−56	12	Relegation to Női Nemzeti Bajnokság II
12	Budaörs (R)	22	1	4	17	22	80	−58	7	Relegation to Női Nemzeti Bajnokság II

Updated to match(es) played on 16 May 2026 (complete). Source: Hungarian Football Federation (in Hungarian)
Rules for classification: 1) Points; 2) Matches won; 3) Goal difference; 4) Goals scored; 5) Head-to-head points; 6) Head-to-head goal difference; 7) Fair play ranking; 8) Drawing of lots.
(R) Relegated

=== Women's Final ===
Team 1	Agg.	Team 2	1st leg	2nd leg
Ferencváros	14–2	Puskás Akadémia	6–2	8–0

Winners: Ferencváros (9th title)

==== First leg ====
23 May 2026	Ferencváros	6–2	Puskás Akadémia	Budapest
15:30	Kubassova 24'; Edwards 62'; Va. Nagy 70', 88'; Zágonyi 74'; Kostić (yellow card) 75'; Vi. Nagy 76'; Túróczy 78'	Report	Merrill 6'; Androniki (yellow card) 33'; Szakonyi (yellow card) 48'; Tuza (yellow card) 74'; Romsi 81'	Stadium: Kocsis Sándor Sportközpont; Attendance: Referee: Réka Bognár

==== Second leg ====
28 May 2026	Puskás Akadémia	0–8 (2–14 agg.)	Ferencváros	Felcsút
18:00	Sági (red card) 62'	Report	Va. Nagy 1', 60', 63' (pen.); Kubassova 5', 37'; Zágonyi 49'; Csányi 66'; Ott 72'	Stadium: Pancho Aréna; Attendance: 300; Referee: Barnabás Drabon

=== Women's Bronze match ===
Team 1	Agg.	Team 2	1st leg	2nd leg
MTK Budapest	1–3	Győri ETO	1–2	0–1

== Cup competitions (Men's) ==
=== MOL Magyar Kupa ===
Final

9 May 2026
18:00 CEST

Ferencváros (1)	1–0 (a.e.t.)	Zalaegerszeg (1)
Szalai (yellow card) 87'; Bamidele (penalty missed) 95'; Raemaekers 111'; Abu Fani (yellow card) 114'	Report	Teixeira (yellow card) 96'; N. Szendrei (yellow card) 100'

Puskás Aréna, Budapest
Attendance: 49,858
Referee: Márton Rúsz

Winner: Ferencváros (25th title)

=== Bracket ===
Round of 16
11 February 2026
Ajka (2)	0
Kazincbarcika (1)	1
11 February 2026
Ferencváros (1)	4
Csákvár (2)	0
12 February 2026
Győri ETO (1)	2
Videoton (2)	0
11 February 2026
MTK Budapest (1)	1
Kecskemét (2)	2
11 February 2026
Budapest Honvéd (2)	2
ESMTK Budapest (3)	0
11 February 2026
Paks (1)	2
Diósgyőr (1)	6
11 February 2026
Zalaegerszeg (1)	2
Vasas (2)	1
11 February 2026
DEAC (3)	0
Soroksár (2)	1

Quarter-finals
4 March 2026
Kazincbarcika (1)	0
Ferencváros (1)	5
3 March 2026
Győri ETO (1) (a.e.t.)	3
Kecskemét (2)	1
5 March 2026
Budapest Honvéd (2)	1
Diósgyőr (1)	0
4 March 2026
Zalaegerszeg (1)	1
Soroksár (2)	0

Semi-finals
22 April 2026
Ferencváros (1) (p)	2 (3)
Győri ETO (1)	2 (2)
21 April 2026
Budapest Honvéd (2)	2 (4)
Zalaegerszeg (1) (p)	2 (5)

Final
9 May 2026
Ferencváros (1) (a.e.t.)	1
Zalaegerszeg (1)	0

== Cup competitions (Women's) ==
=== Simple Női Kupa ===
Final

29 April 2026
19:00 CEST

Budapest Honvéd	0–3	Ferencváros
Horváthová (yellow card) 33'; Palama (yellow card) 47'	Report	V. Nagy 13'; Csányi 33'; Kubassova 58'

Hidegkuti Nándor Stadion, Budapest
Attendance: 585
Referee: Katalin Kulcsár

Winner: Ferencváros (7th title)

=== Bracket ===
Round of 16
5 October 2025
Dunaújváros	0
Újpest	2
4 October 2025
Eger	0
Diósgyőr	5
4 October 2025
Viktoria	2
Szekszárd	0
5 October 2025
Talents	0
Budapest Honvéd	3
3 October 2025
Puskás Akadémia	2
MTK Budapest	1
3 October 2025
Szeged	1
Ferencváros	2
4 October 2025
Győri ETO	7
Budaörs	0
1 October 2025
Fehérvár	0
PMFC	8

Quarter-finals
14 February 2026
Újpest	0
Diósgyőr	3
14 February 2026
Viktoria	0
Budapest Honvéd	2
14 February 2026
Puskás Akadémia	2 (5)
Ferencváros (p)	2 (6)
14 February 2026
Győri ETO	3
PMFC	2

Semi-finals
18 March 2026
Diósgyőr	4
Budapest Honvéd	5
18 March 2026
Ferencváros	2
Győri ETO	0

Final
29 April 2026
Budapest Honvéd	0
Ferencváros	3

== See also ==
- Hungarian football league system
- Hungary national football team results (2020–present)
