= 2026–27 in Hungarian football =

Football in Hungary
- Season: 2026–27

The 2026–27 season is the 128th season of competitive association football in Hungary.

Times are CET/CEST, (Note: CEST (UTC+2) for matches until 26 October 2025 (matchdays 1–4), and CET (UTC+1) for matches thereafter (matchdays 5–6).) as listed by UEFA (local times, if different, are in parentheses).

== National teams ==
=== Hungary men's national football team ===
==== 2026–27 UEFA Nations League ====
===== Group B2 =====
Team 1	Score	Team 2
Hungary	0–1	Ukraine
Northern Ireland	0–0	Hungary
Hungary	1–0	Georgia
Ukraine	1–2	Hungary
Georgia	0–2	Hungary
Hungary	1–1	Northern Ireland

Pos	Team	Pld	W	D	L	GF	GA	GD	Pts	Promotion or qualification	(Northern Ireland)	(Hungary)	(Ukraine)	(Georgia (country))
1	Northern Ireland (P)	6	3	3	0	6	1	+5	12	Promotion to League A	—	0–0	1–0	0–0
2	Hungary	6	3	2	1	6	3	+3	11	Qualification for promotion play-offs	1–1	—	0–1	1–0
3	Ukraine	6	2	1	3	3	6	−3	7		0–3	1–2	—	1–0
4	Georgia	6	0	2	4	0	5	−5	2	Qualification for relegation play-offs	0–1	0–2	0–0	—

Source: UEFA
(P) Promoted

===== Promotion play-off =====
Team 1	Agg.	Team 2	1st leg	2nd leg
Hungary	v	Serbia	25 Mar 2027	28 Mar 2027

===== Matches =====
25 September 2026 2026–27 Nations League	Hungary	0–1	Ukraine	Budapest, Hungary
20:45 CEST	Schäfer (yellow card) 5'; Bárány (yellow card) 83'; Szoboszlai (yellow card) 90+4'; Kerkez (yellow card) 90+4'	Report (UEFA)	Brazhko (yellow card) 21'; Sikan 42'; Krupskyi (yellow card) 49'; Nazarenko (yellow card) 71' (yellow-red card) 90+2'; Tsukanov (yellow card) 90+4'; Matviyenko (yellow card) 90+4'	Stadium: Puskás Aréna; Attendance: 56,796; Referee: Jarred Gillett (England); Assistant referees: Neil Davies, Nick Greenhalgh
Note: • Hungary: B. Tóth — Bolla, Orbán, Csinger (T. Szűcs (substituted on) 84'), Kerkez — Csongvai (R. Tóth (substituted on) 66'), Schäfer, Vitális (M. Tóth (substituted on) 46') — Redzic (Jurek (substituted on) 62'), Szoboszlai (c), Lukács (Bárány (substituted on) 46') • Head coach: Rossi • Best player of the match: Dmytro Riznyk, Ukraine, 8.0

28 September 2026 2026–27 Nations League	Northern Ireland	0–0	Hungary	Belfast, Northern Ireland
20:45 CEST (19:45 UTC+1)	Galbraith (yellow card) 16'; Price (yellow card) 31'; Donley (yellow card) 45+2'; S. Charles (yellow card) 78'	Report (UEFA)	Csongvai (yellow card) 42'; Orbán (yellow card) 45+6'	Stadium: Windsor Park; Attendance: 18,082; Referee: Ricardo de Burgos Bengoetxea (Spain); Assistant referees: Iker De Francisco, Iván Masso Granado
Note: • Hungary: B. Tóth — Bolla (Osváth (substituted on) 34'), Orbán, Csinger, Kerkez — Schäfer, T. Szűcs (A. Tóth (substituted on) 55'), Csongvai (Vitális (substituted on) 76') — Jurek (Bárány (substituted on) 55'), Szoboszlai (c) — Lukács (M. Tóth (substituted on) 76') • Head coach: Rossi • Best player of the match: Balázs Tóth, Hungary, 7.7

2 October 2026 2026–27 Nations League	Hungary	1–0	Georgia	Budapest, Hungary
20:45 CEST	Kerkez 35' (yellow card) 74'; T. Szűcs (yellow card) 82'; Vitális (yellow card) 85'	Report (UEFA)	Kiteishvili (yellow card) 33'; Kochorashvili (yellow card) 67'	Stadium: Puskás Aréna; Attendance: 52,780; Referee: Srđan Jovanović (Serbia); Assistant referees: Uroš Stojković, Miloš Simovic
Note: • Hungary: B. Tóth — Osváth, Orbán, Csinger, Kerkez — Schäfer, A. Tóth (Vitális (substituted on) 57'), Szoboszlai (c) (T. Szűcs (substituted on) 80') — Zs. Nagy (R. Tóth (substituted on) 69'), Lukács (Jurek (substituted on) 80'), M. Tóth (Bárány (substituted on) 57') • Head coach: Rossi • Best player of the match: Dominik Szoboszlai, Hungary, 9.3

5 October 2026 2026–27 Nations League	Ukraine	1–2	Hungary	Trnava, Slovakia (Note: Due to the Russian invasion of Ukraine, Ukraine are required to play their home matches at neutral venues until further notice.)
20:45 (21:45 UTC+3)	Nazaryna (yellow card) 20'; Yaremchuk 83'	Report (UEFA)	M. Tóth 52'; Lukács (yellow card) 55'; R. Tóth (yellow card) 78'; Csinger 85'	Stadium: Anton Malatinský Stadium; Attendance: 7,910; Referee: Igor Pajač (Croatia); Assistant referees: Bojan Zobenica, Ivan Mihalj
Note: • Hungary: B. Tóth — Osváth, Orbán, Csinger, Zs. Nagy — Schäfer (R. Tóth (substituted on) 72'), Vitális — Lukács (Jurek (substituted on) 61'), Szoboszlai (c) (Csongvai (substituted on) 87'), A. Tóth (T. Szűcs (substituted on) 61') — M. Tóth (J. Szalai (substituted on) 72') • Head coach: Rossi • Best player of the match: Márk Csinger, Hungary, 8.1

14 November 2026 2026–27 Nations League	Georgia	0–2	Hungary	Tbilisi, Georgia
18:00 (21:00 UTC+4)	Tsitaishvili (yellow card) 60'	Report (UEFA)	Orbán (yellow card) 19'; Vitális (yellow card) 51'; Dvali 73' (o.g.); B. Varga 85'	Stadium: Mikheil Meskhi Stadium; Attendance: 19,187; Referee: Ondřej Berka (Czech Republic); Assistant referees: Matěj Vlček, Kamil Hajek
Note: • Hungary: B. Tóth — Osváth (Bolla (substituted on) 70'), Orbán, Csinger, Kerkez — Schäfer, Vitális (R. Tóth (substituted on) 70') — Sallai (Pető (substituted on) 87'), Szoboszlai (c), Zs. Nagy (Csongvai (substituted on) 61') — B. Varga (Á. Szendrei (substituted on) 86') • Head coach: Rossi • Best player of the match: Dominik Szoboszlai, Hungary, 8.7

17 November 2026 2026–27 Nations League	Hungary	1–1	Northern Ireland	Budapest, Hungary
20:45 CET	B. Varga 35' (yellow card) 51'; Kerkez (yellow card) 83'	Report (UEFA)	S. Charles (yellow card) 51'; Hume (yellow card) 56'; Devenny 65'	Stadium: Puskás Aréna; Attendance: 55,306; Referee: Marco Guida (Italy); Assistant referees: Giorgio Peretti, Giuseppe Perrotti
Note: • Hungary: B. Tóth — Osváth (Á. Szendrei (substituted on) 84'), Csinger, Markgráf, Kerkez — Schäfer, Csongvai (J. Urblík (substituted on) 70'), Styles (R. Tóth (substituted on) 60') — Bolla (Pető (substituted on) 69'), B. Varga, Szoboszlai (c) • Head coach: Rossi • Best player of the match: Justin Devenny, Northern Ireland, 7.6

25 March 2027 Nations League promotion play-off	Hungary	v	Serbia	Budapest, Hungary
20:45 CET		Report (UEFA)		Stadium: Puskás Aréna

28 March 2027 Nations League promotion play-off	Serbia	v	Hungary	TBD
18:00 CET		Report (UEFA)

=== Hungary men's under-21 national football team ===
==== UEFA European Under-21 Championship ====
Team 1	Score	Team 2
Croatia	3–1	Hungary
Hungary	2–1	Lithuania
Turkey	0–0	Hungary

Pos	Team	Pld	W	D	L	GF	GA	GD	Pts	Qualification	Croatia	Turkey	Ukraine	Hungary	Lithuania
1	Croatia	8	6	1	1	15	3	+12	19	Final tournament	—	3–0	1–0	3–1	4–0
2	Turkey	8	3	4	1	9	8	+1	13	Play-offs	1–1	—	1–0	0–0	2–0
3	Ukraine	8	3	3	2	13	9	+4	12		1–0	2–2	—	3–3	1–1
4	Hungary	8	1	4	3	9	13	−4	7		0–2	1–1	1–2	—	2–1
5	Lithuania	8	0	2	6	4	17	−13	2		0–1	1–2	0–4	1–1	—

Source: UEFA
Legend: Blue = home team win; Yellow = draw; Red = away team win.
Rules for classification: Tiebreakers

==== Friendly ====
Team 1	Score	Team 2
Hungary	N/A	Vasas (NB I)
Hungary	5–3	Cyprus

===== Matches =====
26 September 2026 European Championship qualification	Croatia	3–1	Hungary	Varaždin, Croatia
17:00 CEST	Jagušić 25', 60', 84'; Prpić (yellow card) 49'; Vrbančić (yellow card) 67'; Mlačić (yellow card) 82'	Report	Tuboly 50' (pen.); Dragoner (yellow card) 71'; Okeke (yellow card) 87'	Stadium: Stadion Varteks; Attendance: 1,500; Referee: Karl Koppel (Estonia); Assistant referees: Riivo Stolts, Neeme Neemlaid
Note: • Hungary: Lehoczki – Tercza (Selyem (substituted on) 58'), Dragoner, V. Vitályos, P. Kovács – Okeke, Tuboly (Manner (substituted on) 58'), K. Horváth (Szamosi (substituted on) 86') – Gruber, Z. Átrok (Dénes (substituted on) 71') – B. Kovács • Coach: Antal Németh • Best player of the match: Adriano Jagušić, Croatia, 9.5

1 October 2026 European Championship qualification	Hungary	2–1	Lithuania	Budapest, Hungary
19:00 CEST	Tuboly 30' (pen.); K. Horváth (yellow card) 35'; Pető (yellow card) 69'; Dénes 75'	Report	Grudzinskas 16' (yellow card) 60'; Bierontas (yellow card) 69'; Balsys (yellow card) 70'	Stadium: Hidegkuti Nándor Stadion; Attendance: 1,113; Referee: Bálint Kišš (Slovak); Assistant referees: František Ferenc, Matej Zemko
Note: • Hungary: Lehoczki – Selyem, N. Urblík, V. Vitályos, P. Kovács – Okeke (Patai (substituted on) 81'), Tuboly, K. Horváth (B. Kovács (substituted on) 46') – Pető (Manner (substituted on) 87'), Gruber, Z. Átrok (Dénes (substituted on) 59') • Coach: Antal Németh • Best player of the match: Arnas Voitinovicius, Lithuania, 8.3

6 October 2026 European Championship qualification	Turkey	0–0	Hungary	Istanbul, Turkey
19:00 CEST (20:00 UTC+3)	Çelik (yellow card) 23'	Report	Vitályos (yellow card) 62'; Manner (yellow card) 72'; Lapu (yellow card) 78'; Umathum (yellow card) 90+3'	Stadium: Başakşehir Fatih Terim Stadium; Referee: Amine Kourgheli (Belarus); Assistant referees: Yury Khomchanka, Viktar Hetsikau
Note: • Hungary: Lehoczki – Selyem (Umathum (substituted on) 86'), Dragoner, V. Vitályos, P. Kovács (Lapu (substituted on) 46') – K. Horváth, Tuboly, Szamosi (Patai (substituted on) 60') – Manner (Z. Átrok (substituted on) 73'), B. Kovács, Pető (Gruber (substituted on) 73') • Coach: Antal Németh • Best player of the match: Yiğit Efe Demir, Turkey, 7.8

13 November 2026 Friendly	Hungary	N/A	Vasas (NB I)	Telki, Hungary
14:00 CET				Stadium: Telki Training Center; Attendance: 0 (Closed doors)

16 November 2026 Friendly	Hungary	5–3	Cyprus	Budapest, Hungary
19:00 CET	H. Németh 43', 45'; Egri (yellow card) 53'; Győrfi 60'; P. Kovács 75'; Umathum 84'	Report	Tzouliou 50', 54'; Kontopoulos 90'	Stadium: Hidegkuti Nándor Stadion
Note: • Hungary: Lehoczki – Szakos (Pál (substituted on) 78'), Lakatos, Umathum, V. Vitályos (Csorba (substituted on) 78') – H. Németh (Patai (substituted on) 78'), Madarász (Szamosi (substituted on) 46'), Kern – Győrfi (Hős (substituted on) 62'), Bagi (P. Kovács (substituted on) 46'), Szép (Egri (substituted on) 46') • Coach: Antal Németh • Best player of the match: Hunor Németh, Hungary, 9.3

=== Hungary men's under-19 national football team ===
==== 2027 UEFA European Under-19 Championship qualification ====
League A, Round 2 – Group A7

Hosted: Croatia

Team 1	Score	Team 2
Croatia	4–1	Hungary
Netherlands	2–0	Hungary
Czech Republic	1–0	Hungary

Pos	Team	Pld	W	D	L	GF	GA	GD	Pts	Transfer or relegation
1	Croatia (H)	3	2	1	0	8	4	+4	7	Transferred to Round 3 League A
2	Czech Republic	3	2	1	0	4	1	+3	7	Already qualified for final tournament as hosts
3	Netherlands	3	1	0	2	4	5	−1	3	Transferred to Round 3 League A
4	Hungary	3	0	0	3	1	7	−6	0	Possible Transfer to Round 3 League A

Source: UEFA
Rules for classification: Qualification tiebreakers
(H) Hosts

==== Friendly ====
Team 1	Score	Team 2
Romania	1–2	Hungary
Bulgaria	1–1	Hungary
Serbia	0–4	Hungary

===== Matches =====
32nd Vilotić Tournament – Serbia

24 September 2026 Friendly	Romania	1–2	Hungary	Bačka Topola, Serbia
16:00 CEST	Bota 8'	Report	Gólik 15'; Galambos 90+1'	Stadium: TSC Arena
Note: • Hungary: Kilvinger — Ablonczy (Csóka (substituted on) 46'), Asztalos (Somogyi (substituted on) 66'), Szebellédi (Szakál (substituted on) 46'), Mándity (Milicz (substituted on) 77') — Rab, Zs. Varga, Zubor — Vörös (Brügger (substituted on) 77'), Nyers (E. Kovács (substituted on) 52'), Gólik (Galambos (substituted on) 66') • Coach: Gerliczki

26 September 2026 Friendly	Bulgaria	1–1	Hungary	Bačka Topola, Serbia
16:00 CEST	Boźkov 43'	Report	E. Kovács 38'	Stadium: TSC Arena
Note: • Hungary: Desmond — Csóka (Balázs (substituted on) 63'), Szakál, Szebellédi, Milicz — Somogyi (Brügger (substituted on) 63'), Zs. Varga (Asztalos (substituted on) 63'), Zubor (Mándity (substituted on) 46') — Vörös (Riba (substituted on) 75' (substituted off) 87' (Ablonczy (substituted on) 87')), Galambos, Gólik (E. Kovács (substituted on) 10') • Coach: Gerliczki

29 September 2026 Friendly	Serbia	0–4	Hungary	Subotica, Serbia
16:30 CEST		Report	Zubor 18'; E. Kovács 25'; Rab 45'; Zs. Varga 66'	Stadium: Subotica City Stadium
Note: • Hungary: Kilvinger — Csóka (Balázs (substituted on) 86'), Szebellédi, Szakál, Milicz — Rab (Brügger (substituted on) 86'), Zs. Varga, Zubor (Mándity (substituted on) 66') — Galambos (Somogyi (substituted on) 75'), E. Kovács (Ablonczy (substituted on) 86'), Vörös (Riba (substituted on) 86') • Coach: Gerliczki

- Best goalkeeper of the tournament: Levente Kilvinger, Hungary
- Top goalscorer of the tournament: Erik Kovács (2 goals), Hungary
- Best player of the tournament: Bence Rab, Hungary
- Coach of the tournament: Máté Gerlicki, Hungary

11 November 2026 European U19 Champ. qual.	Croatia	4–1	Hungary	Nedelišće, Croatia
12:00	Pajvančić 37'; Kusanović 50', 53'; Papac 74'	Report	Rab 8' (yellow card) 36'	Stadium: SRP Trate Nedelišće; Referee: Kamal Umudlu (Azerbaijan); Assistant referees: Namik Huseynov (AZE), Andrea Bianchini (ITA)
Note: • Hungary: Kilvinger — Ujváry, Szebellédi, Asztalos, Milicz — Rab (Mándity (substituted on) 61'), Zs. Varga (Polonkai (substituted on) 78'), Zubor (M. Varga (substituted on) 61') — Gólik (Galambos (substituted on) 46'), Nyers, Vörös (E. Kovács (substituted on) 61') • Coach: Gerliczki

14 November 2026 European U19 Champ. qual.	Netherlands	2–0	Hungary	Nedelišće, Croatia
14:00	Slory (yellow card) 43'; Ünüvar 58'; Neijenhuis 78'	Report	E. Kovács (yellow card) 43'; Nyers (yellow card) 69'; Zubor (yellow card) 87'	Stadium: SRP Trate Nedelišće; Referee: Kamal Umudlu (Azerbaijan); Assistant referees: Namik Huseynov (AZE), Josip Bosnjak (CRO)
Note: • Hungary: Desmond – Ujváry, Szebellédi, Prettenhoffer, Csóka – Mándity (M. Varga (substituted on) 65'), Zs. Varga, Rab (Zubor (substituted on) 65'), Milicz (Vörös (substituted on) 82') – Nyers (Gólik (substituted on) 82'), E. Kovács (Galambos (substituted on) 59') • Coach: Gerliczki

17 November 2026 European U19 Champ. qual.	Czech Republic	1–0	Hungary	Križevci, Croatia
12:00	Linhart (yellow card) 26'; Azaka 90+1'	Report	Mándity (yellow card) 37'	Stadium: City Stadium; Referee: Matteo Marcenaro (Italy); Assistant referees: Andrea Bianchini (ITA), Josip Bosnjak (CRO)
Note: • Hungary: Kilvinger – Ujváry, Szebellédi, Prettenhoffer, Csóka – Rab (Polonkai (substituted on) 57'), Zs. Varga – Mándity (Vörös (substituted on) 57'), Zubor, Milicz (M. Varga (substituted on) 80') – E. Kovács (Gólik (substituted on) 65') • Coach: Gerliczki

=== Hungary women's national football team ===
==== 2027 FIFA Women's World Cup qualification – Play-off ====
Team 1	Agg.	Team 2	1st leg	2nd leg
Hungary	0–11	Netherlands	0–8	0–3

===== Matches =====
9 October 2026	Hungary	0–8	Netherlands	Felcsút, Hungary
20:00		Report (FIFA); Report (UEFA)	Beerensteyn 12', 14', 90+1'; Pelova 26', 58', 62'; Brugts 45+1'; Egurrola 49'	Stadium: Pancho Aréna; Referee: Olga Blotskaya (Belarus); Assistant referees: Nargis Magau, Ana Ciobotaru
Note: • Hungary: Brzykcy — Vi. Nagy (L. Papp (substituted on) 70'), H. Németh, F. Nagy, Palakovics, Vincze — Mayer (Mészáros (substituted on) 80'), Csiszár (c), Pusztai (Fenyvesi (substituted on) 80'), Kaján (Zeller (substituted on) 70') — Va. Nagy (Pápai (substituted on) 46') • Head coach: Szarvas

13 October 2026	Netherlands	3–0 (11–0 agg.)	Hungary	Tilburg, Netherlands
20:45	Brugts 8'; Beerensteyn 40'; Egurrola 45+4'	Report (FIFA); Report (UEFA)	Pataki (yellow card) 50'; Vincze (yellow card) 63'	Stadium: Koning Willem II Stadion; Referee: Franziska Wildfeuer (Germany); Assistant referees: Jasmin Matysiak, Daniela Göttlinger
Note: • Hungary: Brzykcy — Vi. Nagy (Zágonyi (substituted on) 46'), F. Nagy, Palakovics, Pataki (Savanya (substituted on) 78') – Fenyvesi (Zeller (substituted on) 66'), L. Papp, Csiszár (c) – Pusztai (Mészáros (substituted on) 66'), Pápai (Va. Nagy (substituted on) 66'), Vincze • Head coach: Szarvas

== UEFA competitions ==
=== UEFA Champions League ===
Participating club: Győri ETO as of winners of the 2025–26 Nemzeti Bajnokság I (domestic league).

==== First qualifying round ====
Team 1	Agg.	Team 2	1st leg	2nd leg
Víkingur Reykjavík (Iceland)	3–2	(Hungary) ETO Győr	1–0	2–2

Note: Details of match can be viewed by clicking on the final result of the given match.

=== UEFA Europa League ===
Participating club: in the Qualifying rounds Ferencváros as winners of the 2025–26 Magyar Kupa (domestic cup).

==== Qualifying rounds ====
===== First qualifying round =====
Team 1	Agg.	Team 2	1st leg	2nd leg
Vojvodina (Serbia)	1–5	(Hungary) Ferencváros	1–2	0–3

Note: Details of match can be viewed by clicking on the final result of the given match.

===== Second qualifying round =====
Team 1	Agg.	Team 2	1st leg	2nd leg
Twente (Netherlands)	3–4	(Hungary) Ferencváros	1–2	2–2

Note: Details of match can be viewed by clicking on the final result of the given match.

===== Third qualifying round =====
Team 1	Agg.	Team 2	1st leg	2nd leg
Ferencváros (Hungary)	2–1	(Poland) Górnik Zabrze	1–0	1–1

Note: Details of match can be viewed by clicking on the final result of the given match.

===== Play-off round =====
Team 1	Agg.	Team 2	1st leg	2nd leg
Trabzonspor (Turkey)	0–5	(Hungary) Ferencváros	0–1	0–4

Note: Details of match can be viewed by clicking on the final result of the given match.

==== League phase ====
Team 1	Score	Team 2
Celtic (Scotland)	1–3	(Hungary) Ferencváros
Ferencváros (Hungary)	2–1	(Czech Republic) Viktoria Plzeň
Ferencváros (Hungary)	4–1	(Portugal) Torreense
Milan (Italy)	0–2	(Hungary) Ferencváros
Ferencváros (Hungary)	26 Nov	(Slovenia) Celje
Lech Poznań (Poland)	10 Dec	(Hungary) Ferencváros
Juventus (Italy)	21 Jan	(Hungary) Ferencváros
Ferencváros (Hungary)	28 Jan	(Germany) TSG Hoffenheim

Pos	Team	Pld	W	D	L	GF	GA	GD	Pts	Qualification
1	(Portugal) Benfica	4	4	0	0	13	3	+10	12	Advance to round of 16 (seeded)
2	(England) Bournemouth	4	4	0	0	11	2	+9	12	Advance to round of 16 (seeded)
3	(Hungary) Ferencváros	4	4	0	0	11	3	+8	12	Advance to round of 16 (seeded)
4	(Belgium) Union Saint-Gilloise	4	3	1	0	10	2	+8	10	Advance to round of 16 (seeded)
5	(Italy) Juventus	4	3	1	0	11	4	+7	10	Advance to round of 16 (seeded)

Updated to match(es) played on 5 November 2026. Source: UEFA
Rules for classification: League phase tiebreakers

=== UEFA Conference League ===
Participating clubs: in the Qualifying rounds Paks as of 3rd place and Debrecen as of 4th place in 2025–26 Nemzeti Bajnokság I (domestic league). ETO Győr participate as losers first qualifying round of 2026–27 UEFA Champions League qualifying.

==== Qualifying rounds ====
===== Second qualifying round =====
Team 1	Agg.	Team 2	1st leg	2nd leg
Atert Bissen (Luxembourg)	3–7	(Hungary) ETO Győr	2–6	1–1
Debrecen (Hungary)	1–0	(Armenia) Pyunik	1–0	0–0
Paks (Hungary)	3–4	(Greece) Panathinaikos	1–2	2–2

Note: Details of match can be viewed by clicking on the final result of the given match.

===== Third qualifying round =====
Team 1	Agg.	Team 2	1st leg	2nd leg
Debrecen (Hungary)	1–8	(Denmark) Copenhagen	0–3	1–5
Riga (Latvia)	2–1	(Hungary) ETO Győr	1–0	1–1

Note: Details of match can be viewed by clicking on the final result of the given match.

=== UEFA Women's Champions League ===
Participating club: Ferencváros as of winners of the 2025–26 in Hungarian football#League competitions (Women's) (domestic league).

==== Qualifying rounds ====
===== Second qualifying round =====
The draw for the second qualifying round was held on 18 June, 2026.

Mini-tournament 2

Hosted by Ferencváros.

5 August 2026 Semi-final	Ferencváros (Hungary)	2–3 (a.e.t.)	(Greece) PAOK	Budapest, Hungary
16:30	Csányi 8'; Kubassova 42'; Frajtović (yellow card) 45+5'; Gágyor (yellow card) 85'; Edwards (yellow card) 90+1'; Diószegi (yellow card) 115'	Report	Andreevska 7'; Argyriou 17'; Brame (yellow card) 78'; Tzourtzevits 93'	Stadium: III. Kerületi TVE stadium Attendance: 251; Referee: Olivia Tschon (Austria); Assistant referees: Lara Anderson (Austria), Melissa Joos (Germany)
Note: Ferencváros: Kostić — Czellér (Gágyor (substituted on) 70'), Ott, Gődér, Árvay (Szántó (substituted on) 91') — Csányi, Fenyvesi (c), Edwards — Frajtović, Gégény (Diószegi (substituted on) 70'), Kubassova • Manager: Flórián Albert Jr.

8 August 2026 Third-place play-off match	Ferencváros (Hungary)	1–2	(Kosovo) Mitrovica	Budapest, Hungary
10:00	Czellér 68'; Kubassova (yellow card) 73'; Gágyor (yellow card) 89'	Report	Fejza (yellow card) 71'; Mulliqi 76', 80'; Zeka (yellow card) 85'; Mulliqi (yellow card) 87'	Stadium: III. Kerületi TVE stadium Attendance: 1,575; Referee: Maria Marotta (Italy); Assistant referees: Laura Gasparini (Italy), Jeanine Okle (Switzerland)
Note: Ferencváros: Kostić — Czellér, Ott, Gődér, Árvay (Gágyor (substituted on) 82') — Csányi (Szántó (substituted on) 46'), Fenyvesi (c), Edwards — Frajtović, Gégény (R. Tóth (substituted on) 68'), Kubassova • Manager: Flórián Albert Jr.

== League competitions (Men's) ==
League Division	Promoted to league	Relegated from league
Nemzeti Bajnokság I	Kispest-Honvéd (Budapest) ▲ from NB II; Vasas (Budapest) ▲ from NB II	TBD
Nemzeti Bajnokság II	Diósgyőr ▼ from NB I; Kazincbarcika ▼ from NB I; Gyirmót ▲ from NB III; Nagykanizsa ▲ from NB III	TBD
Nemzeti Bajnokság III; Group Northeast (Észak-Kelet)	Mátészalka ▲ from MB I — Szabolcs-Szatmár-Bereg county; Salgótarján ▲ from MB I — Nógrád county	TBD
Nemzeti Bajnokság III; Group Northwest (Észak-Nyugat)	Balatonalmádi^{ǂ} ▲ from MB I — Veszprém county; Sárisáp^{ǂ} ▲ from MB I — Komárom-Esztergom county; SZAC (Szentlőrinc) ▲ from MB I — Budapest county; Zalaegerszeg II ▲ from MB I — Zala county; Pápai Perutz^{ǂ} from NB III – Northwest (Észak-Nyugat)	TBD
Nemzeti Bajnokság III; Group Southwest (Dél-Nyugat)	Budafok ▼ from NB II; Sárbogárd ▲ from MB I — Fejér county; Budaörs from NB III – Northwest (Észak-Nyugat); Dunaharaszti from NB III – Southeast (Dél-Kelet); Vasas II from NB III – Southeast (Dél-Kelet)	TBD
Nemzeti Bajnokság III; Group Southeast (Dél-Kelet)	Békéscsaba ▼ from NB II; Sándorfalva ▲ from MB I — Csongrád-Csanád county; Szolnok ▲ from MB I — Jász-Nagykun-Szolnok county; Újpest II from NB III – Northwest (Észak-Nyugat)	TBD

^{ǂ}Balatonalmádi, Pápai Perutz and Sárisáp did not advance from promotion play-offs, but the Competition Committee of Hungarian Football Federation accepted the entries submitted allowing to play in 2026–27 Nemzeti Bajnokság III season.

=== Nemzeti Bajnokság I (Tier 1) ===
==== League table ====
Pos	Team	Pld	W	D	L	GF	GA	GD	Pts	Qualification or relegation
1	Puskás Akadémia	13	8	0	5	18	15	+3	24	Qualification for the Champions League second qualifying round
2	Ferencváros	12	6	5	1	22	10	+12	23	Qualification for the Conference League second qualifying round
3	ETO Győr	13	6	5	2	22	15	+7	23	Qualification for the Conference League second qualifying round
4	Debrecen	13	6	4	3	24	18	+6	22	
5	Paks	13	6	2	5	24	22	+2	20	
6	Újpest	13	5	3	5	21	20	+1	18	
7	Vasas	13	4	4	5	20	19	+1	16	
8	Kispest-Honvéd	12	3	5	4	16	19	−3	14	
9	Zalaegerszeg	13	4	1	8	17	24	−7	13	
10	MTK	13	3	4	6	18	27	−9	13	
11	Nyíregyháza	13	3	3	7	14	24	−10	12	Qualification for the relegation play-off
12	Kisvárda	13	2	6	5	12	15	−3	12	Relegation to the Nemzeti Bajnokság II

Updated to match(es) played on 8 November 2026, Round 13 (6 and 6 matches). Source: Hungarian Football Federation (in Hungarian)
Rules for classification: 1) Points; 2) Matches won; 3) Goal difference; 4) Goals scored (GF); 5) Head-to-head points; 6) Head-to-head goal difference; 7) Fair play ranking; 8) Drawing of lots.

== Cup competitions (Men's) ==
=== MOL Magyar Kupa ===
==== Bracket ====
Round of 16
10 February 2027
PMFC (3)
Ferencváros (1)
10 February 2027
Ajka (2)
Debrecen (1)
10 February 2027
Kozármisleny (2)
Puskás Akadémia (1)
10 February 2027
Paks (1)
Zalaegerszeg (1)
10 February 2027
ESMTK (Budapest) (3)
Vasas (1)
10 February 2027
Kecskemét (2)
Újpest (1)
10 February 2027
Sopron (3)
Gyirmót (2)
10 February 2027
MTK (1)
Nyíregyháza (1)

Quarter-finals
2 March 2027
2 March 2027
2 March 2027
2 March 2027

Semi-finals
20 April 2027
20 April 2027

Final
8 May 2027

== Cup competitions (Women's) ==
=== Simple Női Kupa ===
==== Bracket ====
Round of 16
4 October 2026
Astra	0
Puskás Akadémia	5
3 October 2026
Kelen	0
Győri ETO	3
4 October 2026
Kazincbarcika	0
Videoton FC Fehérvár	3
3 October 2026
Zalaegerszeg	0
Kispest-Honvéd	12
4 October 2026
PVSK (Pécs) (3–1 p)	0
Szekszárd	0
3 October 2026
MTK Budapest (5–4 p)	1
Kész St. Mihály (Szeged)	1
3 October 2026
Ferencváros–Telekom	2
Diósgyőr	1
2 October 2026
PMFC (Pécs)	1
Újpest	4

Quarter-finals
13 or 14 February 2027
Puskás Akadémia
Győri ETO
13 or 14 February 2027
Videoton FC Fehérvár
Kispest-Honvéd
13 or 14 February 2027
PVSK (Pécs)
MTK Budapest
13 or 14 February 2027
Ferencváros–Telekom
Újpest

Semi-finals
17 March 2027
Winner of Match 9
Winner of Match 11
17 March 2027
Winner of Match 10
Winner of Match 12

Final
5 May 2027

== See also ==
- Hungarian football league system
- Hungary national football team results (2020–present)
