= Noah Fenyő =

Hungarian footballer (born 2006)

Personal information
- Full name: Noah Dávid Gabriel Fenyő
- Date of birth: 30 January 2006 (age 20)
- Place of birth: Frankfurt am Main, Germany
- Height: 1.82 m (6 ft 0 in)
- Position: Midfielder

Team information
- Current team: Újpest (on loan from Eintracht Frankfurt)
- Number: 77

Youth career
- –2016: FV Stierstad
- 2016–: Eintracht Frankfurt

Senior career*
Years	Team	Apps	(Gls)
2024–	Eintracht Frankfurt	0	(0)
2024–	Eintracht Frankfurt II	40	(3)
2026–	→ Újpest (loan)	15	(0)

International career^{‡}
2021	Hungary U16	8	(2)
2022–2023	Hungary U17	9	(0)
2023	Hungary U18	3	(0)
2024–2025	Hungary U19	6	(0)
2025–	Hungary U21	5	(1)
- * Club domestic league appearances and goals as of 30 May 2026 ‡ National team caps and goals as of 11:08, 21 November 2025 (UTC)

Noah Dávid Gabriel Fenyő (born 30 January 2006) is a footballer who plays as a midfielder for Hungarian NB I club Újpest on loan from German club Eintracht Frankfurt. Born in Germany, he is a Hungary youth international.

== Career ==
=== Eintracht Frankfurt ===
As a youth player, he joined the youth academy of German Bundesliga side Eintracht Frankfurt, where he captained the club.

On 6 June 2024, Fenyő signed a professional contract with Eintracht for two years, with an optional third.

=== Újpest (loan) ===
On 21 January 2026, Fenyő joined Újpest in Hungary on loan with an option to buy.

== Style of play ==
He mainly operates as a midfielder and is right-footed.

== Personal life ==
He is the son of a Hungarian cellist father and a German violinist mother.
