= Marto Boychev =

Bulgarian footballer (born 2008)

Personal information
- Full name: Marto Nikolov Boychev
- Date of birth: 5 March 2008 (age 18)
- Place of birth: Samokov, Bulgaria
- Height: 1.83 m (6 ft 0 in)
- Position: Midfielder

Team information
- Current team: Rilski Sportist (on loan from CSKA 1948)
- Number: 8

Youth career
- –2022: Levski Sofia
- 2022–2024: CSKA 1948

Senior career*
| Years | Team | Apps | (Gls) |
| 2023–2025 | CSKA 1948 III | 13 | (0) |
| 2024–2025 | CSKA 1948 II | 24 | (6) |
| 2024– | CSKA 1948 | 52 | (1) |
| 2026– | → Rilski Sportist (loan) | 4 | (1) |

International career^{‡}
| 2022–2023 | Bulgaria U15 | 4 | (2) |
| 2023– | Bulgaria U16 | 2 | (1) |
| 2023– | Bulgaria U17 | 8 | (1) |
| 2024– | Bulgaria U19 | 9 | (2) |
| 2024– | Bulgaria U21 | 4 | (0) |
- * Club domestic league appearances and goals as of 07:29, 28 September 2026 (UTC) ‡ National team caps and goals as of 13:56, 7 June 2026 (UTC)

Marto Boychev (Bulgarian: Марто Бойчев; born 15 March 2008) is a Bulgarian professional footballer who plays as a midfielder for Second League club Rilski Sportist Samokov on loan from CSKA 1948 Sofia.

== Career ==
Boychev started his youth career at Levski Sofia Academy, before joining CSKA 1948 academy in 2022. On 10 February he made his debut for the team in the 2023 Bulgarian Supercup against Ludogorets Razgrad at the age of 15 years, 10 months and 26 days. He completed his league debut on 25 February in a match against Slavia Sofia.

== Career statistics ==
As of 13 May 2026

Appearances and goals by club, season and competition
| Club | Season | League | | | National cup | | Europe | | Other | | Total | |
| Club | Season | Division | Apps | Goals | Apps | Goals | Apps | Goals | Apps | Goals | Apps | Goals |
|---|---|---|---|---|---|---|---|---|---|---|---|---|
| CSKA 1948 III | 2023–24 | Third League | 11 | 0 | – | | – | | – | | 11 | 0 |
| CSKA 1948 III | 2024–25 | Third League | 2 | 0 | – | | – | | – | | 2 | 0 |
| CSKA 1948 III | Total | | 13 | 0 | 0 | 0 | 0 | 0 | 0 | 0 | 13 | 0 |
| CSKA 1948 II | 2023–24 | Second League | 8 | 1 | – | | – | | – | | 8 | 1 |
| CSKA 1948 II | 2024–25 | Second League | 16 | 5 | – | | – | | – | | 16 | 5 |
| CSKA 1948 II | Total | | 24 | 6 | 0 | 0 | 0 | 0 | 0 | 0 | 24 | 6 |
| CSKA 1948 | 2023–24 | First League | 5 | 0 | 0 | 0 | – | | 1 | 0 | 6 | 0 |
| CSKA 1948 | 2024–25 | First League | 22 | 0 | 1 | 0 | 1 | 0 | – | | 24 | 0 |
| CSKA 1948 | 2025–26 | First League | 23 | 1 | 3 | 0 | – | | – | | 26 | 1 |
| CSKA 1948 | Total | | 50 | 1 | 4 | 0 | 1 | 0 | 1 | 0 | 56 | 1 |
| Career total | | | 87 | 7 | 4 | 0 | 1 | 0 | 0 | 0 | 92 | 7 |
