= Jovan Milosavljević =

Serbian footballer (born 2007)

Personal information
- Date of birth: 7 February 2007 (age 19)
- Place of birth: Belgrade, Serbia
- Height: 1.86 m (6 ft 1 in)
- Position: Midfielder

Team information
- Current team: Malmö FF
- Number: 28

Youth career
- –2024: Brodarac

Senior career*
Years	Team	Apps	(Gls)
2024–2025	Železničar Pančevo	30	(3)
2025	→ OFK Vršac (loan)	8	(1)
2026–	Malmö FF	7	(2)

International career^{‡}
2024–2025	Serbia U18	7	(1)
2025–	Serbia U19	11	(2)
- * Club domestic league appearances and goals as of 19 September 2026 ‡ National team caps and goals as of 31 March 2026

Jovan Milosavljević (Serbian Cyrillic: Јован Милосављевић; born 7 February 2007) is a Serbian professional footballer who plays as a midfielder for Swedish club Malmö FF.

== Club career ==
As a youth player, Milosavljević joined the youth academy of Serbian side FK Brodarac. Following his stint there, he signed for Serbian side FK Železničar Pančevo in 2024, where he made thirty league appearances and scored three goals. Serbian news website wrote that he "would be among the most notable [players]" while playing for the club.

Six months later, he was sent on loan to Serbian side OFK Vršac, where he made eight league appearances and scored one goal. Ahead of the 2026 season, he signed for Swedish side Malmö FF.

== International career ==
Milosavljević is a Serbia youth international and captained the Serbia national under-19 football team. During November 2025, he played for the Serbia national under-19 football team for 2026 UEFA European Under-19 Championship qualification.

== Career statistics ==
As of match played 19 September 2026

Appearances and goals by club, season and competition
Club	Season	League			Cup		Europe		Total	
Club	Season	Division	Apps	Goals	Apps	Goals	Apps	Goals	Apps	Goals
Železničar Pančevo	2024–25	Serbian SuperLiga	13	1	1	0	—		14	1
Železničar Pančevo	2025–26	Serbian SuperLiga	17	2	2	0	—		19	2
Železničar Pančevo	Total		30	3	3	0	—		33	3
OFK Vršac (loan)	2024–25	Serbian First League	8	1	—		—		8	1
Malmö	2026	Allsvenskan	7	2	4	1	0	0	11	3
Career total			45	6	7	1	0	0	52	7
