= Antal Németh =

Hungarian football manager

Antal Róbert Németh
Personal information
- Date of birth: 1 March 1974 (age 52)
- Place of birth: Budapest, Hungary

Managerial career
- Years: Team
- Budaörs (youth)
- 2017–2019: Hungary U17
- 2018–2019: Hungary U19
- 2019: Hungary U16
- 2021: DAC Dunajská Streda
- 2026: Hungary U21

Antal Németh (born 1 March 1974) is a Hungarian professional football coach who last managed Fortuna Liga club DAC 1904 Dunajská Streda.

== Manager career ==
On 23 January 2026, Németh was appointed as the coach of the Hungary national under-21 football team.

On 26 March 2026, he debuted as the coach of the Hungary national under-21 football team with a 1-0 defeat from Israel national under-21 football team at Pancho Aréna, Felcsút.

== Personal life ==
Németh is married to his wife Stella.
