= Máté Tuboly =

Hungarian footballer (born 2004)

Personal information
- Date of birth: 15 September 2004 (age 22)
- Place of birth: Budapest, Hungary
- Height: 1.86 m (6 ft 1 in)
- Position: Midfielder

Team information
- Current team: DAC Dunajská Streda
- Number: 68

Youth career
- 2012–2013: Solymár
- 2013–2014: Hegyvidék
- 2014–2020: Vasas Kubala Akadémia
- 2020–2021: Győr

Senior career*
Years	Team	Apps	(Gls)
2021–2023	Győr II	14	(2)
2021–2024	Győr	49	(2)
2023–2024	→ Debrecen (loan)	12	(0)
2023–2024	→ Debrecen II (loan)	6	(1)
2024–	DAC Dunajská Streda	52	(4)

International career^{‡}
2018	Hungary U15	1	(0)
2020	Hungary U16	2	(0)
2022–2023	Hungary U19	10	(2)
2025–	Hungary U21	4	(2)
- * Club domestic league appearances and goals as of 25 May 2026 ‡ National team caps and goals as of 18 November 2025

Máté Tuboly (born 15 September 2004) is a Hungarian professional footballer, who plays as a midfielder for Slovak First Football League club DAC Dunajská Streda and the Hungary U21 national team.

== Career ==
On 30 August 2023, Tuboly signed for Nemzeti Bajnokság I club Debrecen on loan from Nemzeti Bajnokság II club Győr.

On 11 June 2024, Slovak First Football League club DAC Dunajská Streda announced the signing of Tuboly on a two-year deal. On 30 October 2025, the club announced that he had extended his contract until the summer of 2028, with his previous deal originally set to expire in June 2026.

== Career statistics ==
=== Club ===
As of match played 13 December 2025

Appearances and goals by club, season and competition
Club	Season	League			National cup (Note: Includes Magyar Kupa, Slovak Cup)		Europe		Total	
Club	Season	Division	Apps	Goals	Apps	Goals	Apps	Goals	Apps	Goals
Győr II	2020–21	Megyei Bajnokság I	3	0	—		—		3	0
Győr II	2021–22	Nemzeti Bajnokság III	9	2	—		—		9	2
Győr II	2023–24	Nemzeti Bajnokság III	2	0	—		—		2	0
Győr II	Total		14	2	—		—		14	2
Győr	2020–21	Nemzeti Bajnokság II	1	0	—		—		1	0
Győr	2021–22	Nemzeti Bajnokság II	19	2	5	0	—		24	2
Győr	2022–23	Nemzeti Bajnokság II	29	0	2	0	—		31	0
Győr	Total		49	2	7	0	—		56	2
Debrecen (loan)	2023–24	Nemzeti Bajnokság I	12	0	0	0	—		12	0
Debrecen II (loan)	2023–24	Nemzeti Bajnokság III	6	1	—		—		6	1
DAC Dunajská Streda	2024–25	Slovak First Football League	23	1	4	0	1 (Note: Appearance in UEFA Conference League)	0	28	1
DAC Dunajská Streda	2025–26	Slovak First Football League	18	0	3	0	—		21	0
DAC Dunajská Streda	Total		41	1	7	0	1	0	49	1
Career total			122	6	14	0	1	0	137	6

=== International ===
As of match played 18 November 2025

Appearances and goals by national team and year
Team	Year	Total	
Team	Year	Apps	Goals
Hungary U15	2018	1	0
Hungary U16	2020	2	0
Hungary U19	2022	8	2
Hungary U19	2023	2	0
Hungary U19	Total	10	2
Hungary U21	2025	4	2
Career total		17	4

Scores and results list Hungary's goal tally first, score column indicates score after each Tuboly goal.

All youth international goals scored by Máté Tuboly
No.	Team	Cap	Date	Venue	Opponent	Score	Result	Competition
1	Hungary U19	3	24 September 2022	Central Park, Denbighshire, Wales	Gibraltar U19	6–0	8–0	2023 UEFA European Under-19 Championship qualification
2	Hungary U19	8	19 November 2022	Centro di Preparazione Olimpica di Tirrenia, Tirrenia, Italy	Italy U19	2–6	2–7	Friendly
1	Hungary U21	1	9 September 2025	LSC Druskininkai Stadium, Druskininkai, Lithuania	Lithuania U21	1–0	1–1	2027 UEFA European Under-21 Championship qualification
2	Hungary U21	2	10 October 2025	Fazanerija City Stadium, Murska Sobota, Slovenia	Ukraine U21	1–1	3–3	2027 UEFA European Under-21 Championship qualification

== Honours ==
Győr II

- Megyei Bajnokság I – Győr–Moson–Sopron: 2020–21
