= Emőke Pápai =

Hungarian footballer

Personal information
- Full name: Emőke Patricia Pápai
- Date of birth: 24 June 2003 (age 23)
- Place of birth: Hungary
- Height: 1.68 m (5 ft 6 in)
- Position: Midfielder

Team information
- Current team: 1. FC Nürnberg
- Number: 15

Senior career*
Years	Team	Apps	(Gls)
2018–2021	MTK	29	(24)
2021–2024	Grasshoppers	48	(26)
2024–2026	Werder Bremen	34	(6)
2026–	1. FC Nürnberg	21	(5)

International career^{‡}
2018–2019	Hungary U17	10	(9)
2020–	Hungary	54	(9)
- * Club domestic league appearances and goals as of 22 November 2026 ‡ National team caps and goals as of 18 April 2026

Emőke Patricia Pápai (born 24 June 2003) is a Hungarian footballer who plays as a midfielder for Frauen-Bundesliga club 1. FC Nürnberg and the Hungary women's national team.

== Career ==
Pápai is a member of the Hungary national team. She made her debut for the team on 13 April 2021 against Bosnia and Herzegovina, coming on as a substitute for Lilla Turányi.

In July 2024 Pápai joined Frauen-Bundesliga club Werder Bremen from Swiss side Grasshoppers. In the 2025–26 season she scored 4 goals in 12 appearances, starting in one match. During her time at Werder Bremen, she made 41 appearances scoring 7 goals; of her 34 league appearances 32 were as a substitute.

Pápai moved to Werder's Bundesliga rivals 1. FC Nürnberg on 2 February 2026, the last day of the 2025–26 winter transfer window.

== Style of play ==
Pápai can be deployed as a right midfielder or as a forward. She has received praise for her technical and physical abilities on the football pitch. Her ability to score numerous goals has also been noted.

== Career statistics ==
Scores and results list Hungary's goal tally first, score column indicates score after each Pápai goal.

List of international goals scored by Emőke Pápai
No.	Date	Venue	Opponent	Score	Result	Competition
1	10 June 2021	Szent Gellért Fórum, Szeged, Hungary	Serbia	2–0	4–0	Friendly
2	10 June 2021	Szent Gellért Fórum, Szeged, Hungary	Serbia	4–0	4–0	Friendly
3	14 June 2021	Szent Gellért Fórum, Szeged, Hungary	Serbia	2–3	2–3	Friendly
4	5 September 2022	Victoria Stadium, Gibraltar	Gibraltar	8–0	12–0	Friendly
5	15 November 2022	Haladás Sportkomplexum, Szombathely, Hungary	Uzbekistan	2–0	5–0	Friendly
6	4 June 2024	Hidegkuti Nándor Stadion, Budapest, Hungary	Switzerland	1–0	1–0	UEFA Women's Euro 2025 qualifying
7	12 July 2024	Dalga Arena, Baku, Azerbaijan	Azerbaijan	3–0	5–0	UEFA Women's Euro 2025 qualifying
8	7 March 2026	Pancho Aréna, Felcsút, Hungary	Azerbaijan	1–0	1–0	2027 FIFA Women's World Cup qualification
9	18 April 2026	Pancho Aréna, Felcsút, Hungary	North Macedonia	3–0	7–0	2027 FIFA Women's World Cup qualification
