= Marco Rossi (footballer, born 1964) =

Italian-Hungarian footballer and manager

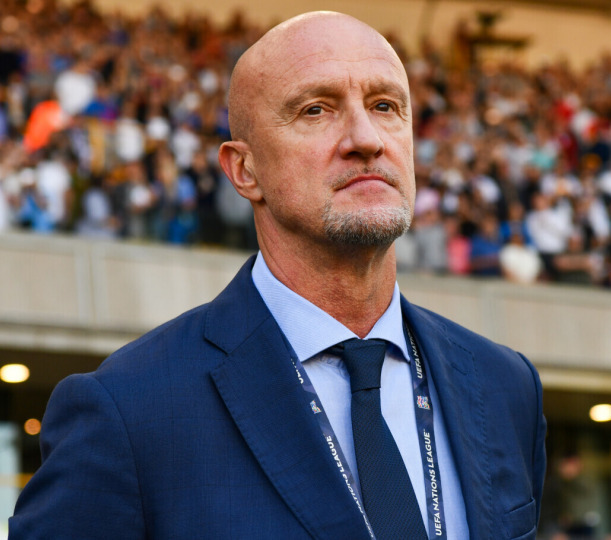
- Rossi in 2022

Personal information
- Full name: Marco Rossi
- Date of birth: 9 September 1964 (age 62)
- Place of birth: Druento, Italy
- Height: 1.87 m (6 ft 2 in)
- Position: Defender

Team information
- Current team: Hungary (manager)

Senior career*
Years	Team	Apps	(Gls)
1983–1984	Torino	2	(0)
1984–1986	Campania	61	(7)
1986–1987	Campania Puteolana	26	(3)
1987–1988	Catanzaro	38	(3)
1988–1993	Brescia	164	(10)
1993–1995	Sampdoria	25	(1)
1995–1996	América	17	(2)
1996–1997	Eintracht Frankfurt	15	(0)
1997–1998	Piacenza	24	(0)
1998–1999	Ospitaletto	23	(1)
1999–2000	AC Salò	24	(0)
Total		419	(27)

Managerial career
- 2004–2006: AC Lumezzane
- 2006: Pro Patria Calcio
- 2007–2008: Pro Patria Calcio
- 2008–2009: Spezia Calcio
- 2010: Scafatese
- 2010–2011: Cavese
- 2012–2014: Budapest Honvéd
- 2015–2017: Budapest Honvéd
- 2017–2018: DAC Dunajská Streda
- 2018–: Hungary
- * Club domestic league appearances and goals

Marco Rossi (born 9 September 1964) is an Italian and Hungarian football manager and former professional footballer who is the current manager of Hungary's national team.

His greatest achievement as a player was winning the Italian Cup with Sampdoria. After retirement in 2000, Rossi became a manager at various clubs throughout Italy from 2004 to 2011, most notably Spezia Calcio. In August 2012, he took up the position of head coach of Budapest Honvéd FC, where he served in two spells. In 2017, he signed a two-year contract with FC DAC 1904 and since 19 June 2018, he has served as the manager of the Hungary national team.

As a coach, he won the 2016-2017 Hungarian Football League title with Budapest Honvéd and finished third in the 2017–18 Slovak First Football League with DAC 1904. He has also coached the Hungary national team to qualification for UEFA Euro 2020 and UEFA Euro 2024.

== Club career ==
Growing up in the Torino youth academy, with whose Primavera team he won an Italian Cup and a Viareggio Tournament, he made his Serie A debut in the 1983–1984 season in Torino-Ascoli (0-0) on March 18, 1984. He moved on to Campania, where he remained three seasons in Serie C1. In 1987 he moved to Catanzaro, newly promoted to Serie B: the Calabrians, in their first year in the division, missed promotion to Serie A by one point, and Rossi was a starter in defence.

In 1988 he moved to Brescia, where he played five consecutive championships, gaining promotion to Serie A in 1992. In 1993, after the relegation of the Rondinelle, he moved to Sampdoria for 2.5 billion lire, and remained there for two seasons in the top division; at this juncture he was included in the FIFA 97 video game database with the highest rating in the game, corresponding to 97. When his contract with the Genoese club expired, at the age of 31, he moved abroad, first to Mexico to América, then to Germany to Eintracht Frankfurt.

In 1997 he returned to Italy to end his professional career at Piacenza, with which he won salvation in Serie A in a season conditioned by repeated injuries. He played three seasons in the amateurs, one with Ospitaletto (relegation to Eccellenza due to last place) and two with Salò (in Eccellenza Lombarda).

== Managerial career ==
Initially, he worked for lower Italian teams.

=== Budapest Honvéd ===
Then, in August 2012, he was appointed as the coach of Budapesti Honvéd FC. In his first season, he took third place with Honvéd in the Nemzeti Bajnokság I. However, he was no longer as successful in the following season, so on 28 April 2014, Rossi resigned from his position.

On 7 February 2015, Rossi was appointed as the coach of the Nemzeti Bajnokság I club Budapest Honvéd FC for the second time in his career.

Although Budapest Honvéd FC was not the most financially stable club of the Nemzeti Bajnokság I, Rossi won the 2016–17 Nemzeti Bajnokság I after securing their trophy against their rival Videoton FC in the last round of the season. The last match was won by Honvéd 1–0 at the Bozsik Stadion, Budapest, Hungary.

After winning the 2016–17 Nemzeti Bajnokság I season with Budapest Honvéd FC, Rossi resigned as the manager of Honvéd by saying that:

I've become a champion, so I will have a chapter in the history book of this fantastic club. I've done my job, which is a beautiful job, and as they say, you have to stop at the top. I will do no different.

Rossi was chosen as the best manager of the 2016–17 Nemzeti Bajnokság I season.

=== Dunajská Streda ===
On 11 June 2017, it was announced that Rossi would sign for the Slovak club DAC Dunajská Streda 1904 for two years plus an option for one more year. The club is strongly supported by the Hungarian minority in Slovakia. The team plays in the Slovak First League.

In the final round of the season, DAC beat Ružomberok 4–0 away from home to secure their place on the podium, while Rossi led another team to the Europa League qualifiers after bronze medallist Honvéd.

=== Hungary national team ===
On 19 June 2018, Rossi was announced as the new manager of the Hungary national football team. He replaced Georges Leekens.

In 2018, András Gáll's book about Rossi's years spent with Honvéd entitled Marco Rossi: Olasz meló Magyarországon (Marco Rossi: The Italian Job in Hungary) was published.

He debuted as the new coach of Hungary on 8 September 2018 against Finland in the 2018–19 UEFA Nations League series. In the 2018–19 UEFA Nations League edition, Hungary finished second in their group; thus, they were promoted to the 2020–21 UEFA Nations League B. Hungary could beat Greece at the Ferencváros Stadion on 11 September 2018. However, Hungary lost to Greece 1–0 on 12 October 2018 at the Olympic Stadium (Athens), Greece. In the last two rounds, Hungary beat Estonia 2–0, and Finland 2–0 at home. Since Greece lost to Estonia at home, Hungary finished second in their group and their chances to qualify for the UEFA Euro 2020 remained alive.

In the UEFA Euro 2020 qualifying, Hungary finished fourth in their group. On 21 March 2019, Hungary lost to Slovakia 2–0 at the Anton Malatinský Stadium, Trnava, Slovakia. However, Hungary beat 2018 FIFA World Cup Finalists Croatia on 24 March 2019 at the Ferencváros Stadion 2-1 In June 2019, Hungary beat Azerbaijan and Wales. However, in the decisive match against Slovakia, Hungary lost again 1–2 at home. On 19 November 2019, Hungary went to Wales to win their last match and qualify directly for Euro 2020. However, Hungary lost 2–0 to Wales. Thanks to the results reached in the 2018–19 UEFA Nations League C, Hungary were given the chance to qualify for their Euro 2020. In the UEFA Euro 2020 qualifying play-offs, Hungary were drawn in Path A along with Bulgaria, Romania, and Iceland. In the first match, Hungary beat Bulgaria 3–1 on 8 October 2020 at the Vasil Levski National Stadium, Sofia, Bulgaria. Since Romania lost to Iceland at the Laugardalsvöllur, Reykjavík, Iceland, Hungary could play at the newly built Puskás Aréna in Budapest. One day before the national team's decisive Euro 2020 qualifiers play-off match against Iceland, Rossi was tested positive for COVID-19. On 12 November 2020, Hungary qualified for the UEFA Euro 2020 by beating Iceland 2–1 at home.

In Euro 2020, Hungary failed to progress from the group stage, yet it impressed with an outstanding performance against three powerhouses, Portugal, France and Germany, only losing 0–3 to the Portuguese after eighty minutes and drawing both France and Germany in the process.

In the 2020–21 UEFA Nations League B series, Hungary played against Serbia, Russia, and Turkey. Surprisingly, Hungary won their group by beating Turkey twice and Serbia once. Hungary beat Turkey 1–0 at the New Sivas 4 Eylül Stadium, Sivas, Turkey, on 3 September 2020. Hungary also beat Serbia at the Red Star Stadium, Belgrade, Serbia on 11 October 2020. On the final match day, Hungary beat Turkey 2–0 at the Puskás Aréna on 18 November 2020.

In the 2022–23 UEFA Nations League series, Rossi's Hungary were drawn in one of the most difficult groups, including Italy, England, and Germany. Nevertheless, Hungary finished second in the group and beat England twice and Germany once in 2022. Hungary beat England 1–0 at home in the Puskás Aréna on 4 June 2022. Ten days later, Hungary beat England 4–0 at the Molineux Stadium, Wolverhampton, England. On 23 September 2022, Hungary beat Germany 1–0 at the Red Bull Arena (Leipzig), Leipzig, Germany. In the last round, Hungary could have qualified for the finals; however, they lost to Italy at the Puskás Aréna on 26 September 2022.

On 31 October 2022, a detailed interview with Rossi was published by Nemzeti Sport entitled Success in Hungary has changed my life. During the interview, it was also leaked that a film would be created on Marco Rossi coaching the Hungarian national team. A week later, on 8 November, Rossi said that Balázs Dzsudzsák deserved a farewell match so he invited him to the squad against Greece. The match was scheduled for 20 November, where Hungary beat Greece 2–1.

On 16 November 2023, Hungary secured their qualification to the UEFA Euro 2024 on top of their Group G, following a 2–2 away draw against Bulgaria.

On 15 June 2024, Hungary lost 3–1 to Switzerland and on 19 June 2024 to Germany (2–0). However, Hungary could win their last group match against Scotland thanks to a late goal by Rossi's substitution, Kevin Csoboth. Since Hungary was ranked as the second worst third placed team could not qualify for the knock-out stage.

On 27 June 2024, Rossi said that he had not enjoyed any moments of the UEFA Euro 2024 in a press conference. He also said that it is very difficult to think about the future at that time. His statements at the press conference caused uncertainty about his future as the coach of the national team. However, on 3 July 2024, it was confirmed by Sándor Csányi that Rossi remained the coach of the national team.

On 9 May 2025, he renewed his contract valid until 2030.

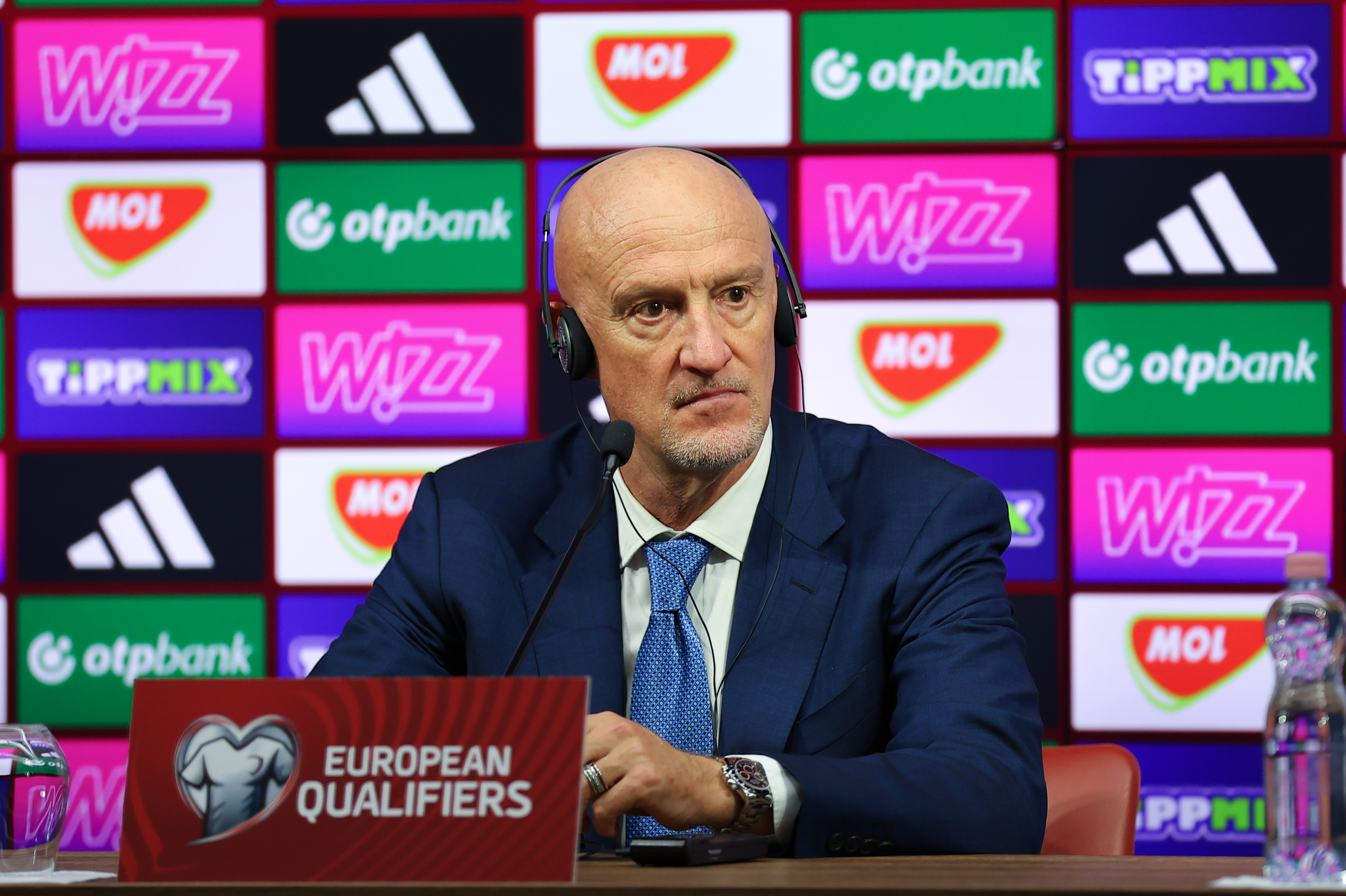
Rossi in a press conference after Hungary vs Armenia at Puskás Aréna in October 2025

The year 2025 was not the most successful for Rossi. In March 2025, Hungary lost twice against Turkey 6–2 on aggregate in the 2024–25 UEFA Nations League promotion/relegation play-offs. In June 2025, Hungary lost to Sweden 2–0 in a friendly match at home, while beat Azerbaijan 2–1 away. Hungary started the 2026 FIFA World Cup qualification matches in Dublin at the Aviva Stadium against the Republic of Ireland. The match ended with a 2–2 draw. The second match against Portugal was lost in the last ten minutes when two Liverpool players, Szoboszlai and Kerkez, misunderstood each other, resulting in a decisive final goal. The match ended with a 3–2 victory for Portugal. In the third round, Hungary hosted Armenia and beat them at Puskás Aréna 2–0. A couple of days later, Hungary drew with Portugal in Lisbon at the Estádio da Luz 2–2. In the final rounds, Hungary beat Armenia away 1–0. In the last round, Hungary could have reached the play-offs by drawing against the Republic of Ireland. Although Hungary were winning the match by 2–1 in the 70th minute, Ireland equalized the result and, in extra time, scored their winning goal. Finally, Hungary finished in the third position; thus, being unable to reach at least the playoffs.

On 25 November 2025, his position as the coach of the national team was confirmed by the head of the Hungarian Football Federation, Sándor Csányi.

== Managerial statistics ==
As of match played 17 November 2026

Managerial record by team and tenure
Team	Nat	From	To	Record							
Team	Nat	From	To	G	W	D	L	GF	GA	GD	Win %
AC Lumezzane	(Italy)	1 July 2004	15 March 2006	72	19	21	32	68	90	−22	26.39
Pro Patria Calcio	(Italy)	22 June 2006	12 December 2006	20	5	7	8	16	31	−15	25.00
Pro Patria Calcio	(Italy)	17 April 2007	10 June 2008	46	14	19	13	53	47	+6	30.43
Spezia Calcio	(Italy)	10 June 2008	17 June 2009	40	25	10	5	68	31	+37	62.50
Scafatese	(Italy)	21 January 2010	11 May 2010	14	5	4	5	15	12	+3	35.71
Cavese	(Italy)	5 August 2010	15 February 2011	25	7	8	10	28	27	+1	28.00
Budapest Honvéd	(Hungary)	1 June 2012	28 April 2014	86	36	18	32	137	113	+24	41.86
Budapest Honvéd	(Hungary)	7 February 2015	31 May 2017	95	45	18	32	149	104	+45	47.37
Dunajská Streda	(Slovakia)	11 June 2017	19 July 2018	39	21	10	8	63	25	+38	53.85
Hungary	(Hungary)	19 June 2018	Present	92	43	22	27	126	106	+20	46.74
Total				529	220	137	172	723	586	+137	41.59

== Honours ==
=== Player ===
Sampdoria

- Coppa Italia: 1993–94
- Supercoppa Italiana runner-up: 1994

=== Manager ===
Budapest Honvéd FC

- Nemzeti Bajnokság I: 2016–17

=== Individual ===
- Hungarian Coach of the Year: 2020, 2022, 2023

== Personal ==
In an interview, he said that his friend, an Italian restaurant (Millennium da Pippo) owner in Budapest, convinced him to ask the owner of Budapest Honvéd, George Hemingway, in 2011 if they are interested in hiring him. The following year, he was employed by Honvéd as the coach.

On 3 October 2023, he became a Hungarian citizen. During the ceremony, the former President of Hungary, Katalin Novák, was also present. In an interview with World Soccer, he said that he will be grateful for Hungary until the end of his life. In an interview with Nemzeti Sport, he said that Hungary is his second home.
