= Diána Csányi =

Hungarian footballer (born 1998)

Personal information
- Date of birth: 20 March 1998 (age 28)
- Height: 1.63 m (5 ft 4 in)
- Position: Midfielder

Team information
- Current team: FC Zürich Frauen
- Number: 27

International career
| Years | Team | Apps | (Gls) |
| 2017– | Hungary | 46 | (4) |

Diána Csányi (born 20 March 1998) is a Hungarian footballer who plays as a midfielder and has appeared for the Hungary women's national team.

== Career ==
Csányi has been capped for the Hungary national team, appearing for the team during the 2019 FIFA Women's World Cup qualifying cycle.
