= Zsanett Kaján =

Hungarian footballer (born 1997)

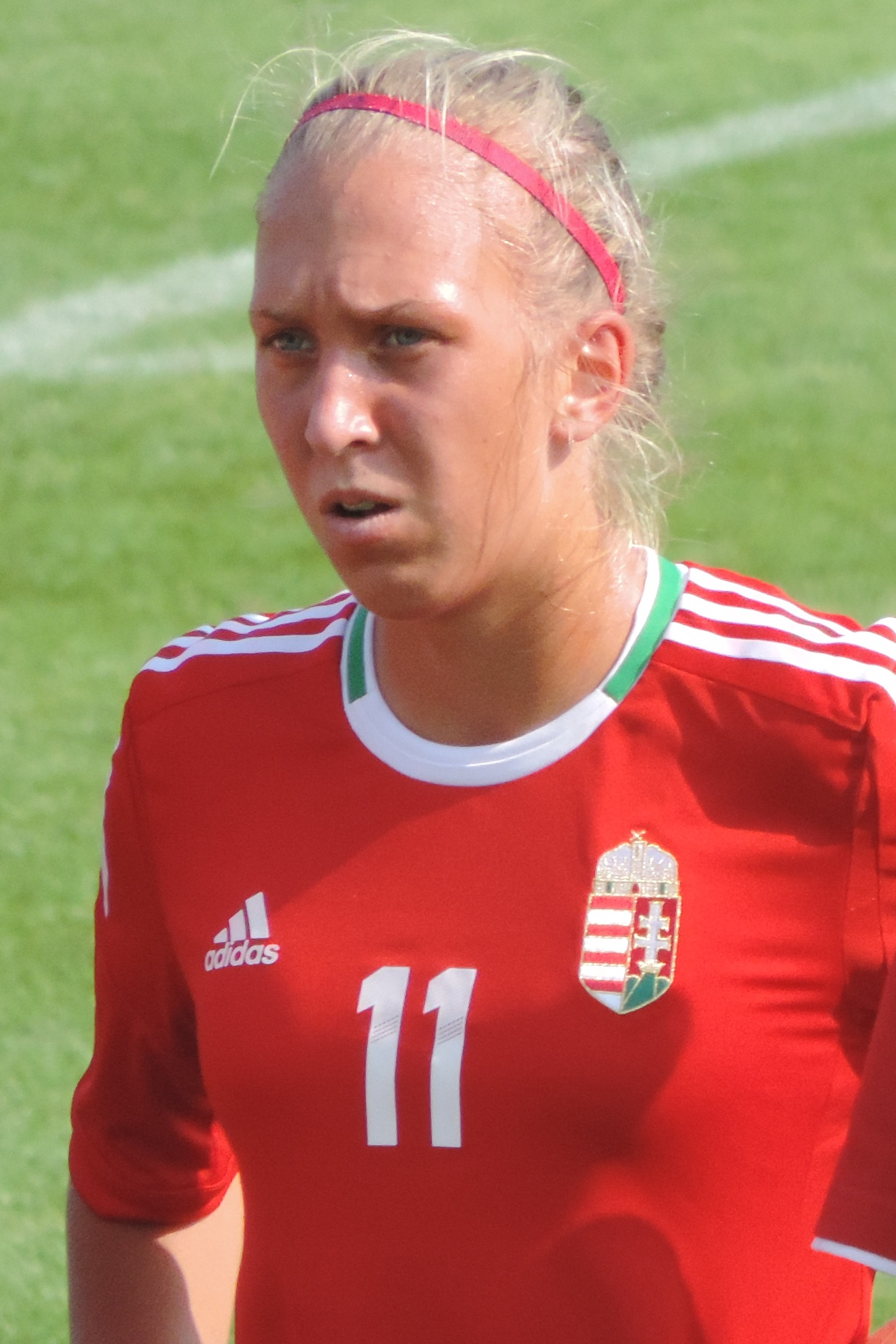
- Kaján with Hungary in 2013

Personal information
- Full name: Zsanett Bernadett Kaján
- Date of birth: 16 September 1997 (age 29)
- Place of birth: Budapest, Hungary
- Height: 5 ft 7 in (1.70 m)
- Position: Forward

Team information
- Current team: Fenerbahçe

Youth career
- 2006–2013: Ferencvárosi TC

College career
Years	Team	Apps	(Gls)
2017–2021	St. John's Red Storm	86	(45)

Senior career*
Years	Team	Apps	(Gls)
2012–2014	Ferencvárosi TC	36	(43)
2014–2016	MTK Hungária FC	46	(29)
2022	OL Reign	0	(0)
2022–2024	Fiorentina	24	(9)
2024	→ Como (loan)	11	(4)
2024–2025	Lazio	17	(1)
2025–2026	Parma	11	(0)
2026–	Fenerbahçe	9	(6)

International career^{‡}
2013–	Hungary	54	(11)
- * Club domestic league appearances and goals as of 06:44, 3 August 2026 (UTC) ‡ National team caps and goals as of 6 March 2019

Zsanett Bernadett Kaján (born 16 September 1997) is a Hungarian professional footballer who plays as a forward for Turkish club Fenerbahçe and the Hungary national team.

== Collegiate career ==
Kaján played forward for the St. John's University Red Storm women's soccer team in Queens, New York City, from 2017 to 2021, scoring 45 goals and 11 assists in nearly 6,000 minutes played and 86 appearances. She was one of eight players to score more than 40 total points in the 2021 NCAA Division I women's soccer season.

== Club career ==
=== Ferencvárosi TC ===
While playing with the youth teams of Ferencvárosi TC, Kaján began her club career with the senior team in 2012. She left the team after the 2013–14 JET-SOL Liga Női NB I season, having tied for second-most goals scored on the team's season with 9.

=== MTK Hungária FC ===
Kaján played for MTK Hungária FC from 2014 to 2016. In the JET-SOL Liga 2015–16 season, she scored 10 goals in 14 matches, the league's sixth-largest tally. With MTK, she started at forward in 2014–15 UEFA Women's Champions League Round of 32 matches against SV Neulengbach. She scored and assisted in the first leg of the 2016 JET-SOL Liga finals, which MTK lost to Kaján's former team Ferencvárosi TC on aggregate. She then departed for St. John's University.

=== OL Reign ===
Kaján was selected eighth overall in the 2022 NWSL Draft by OL Reign of the National Women's Soccer League and signed with the team on 20 January 2022. She did not appear for the Reign in her six months with the team before being transferred for an undisclosed fee to ACF Fiorentina on 27 June 2022.

=== Fiorentina ===
On 18 July 2022, ACF Fiorentina announced that the club had signed Kajan to a contract through June 2023.

== International career ==
Kaján earned her first cap with the Hungary women's national football team at the age of 18.

== International goals ==
Scores and results are list Hungary's goal tally first.

No.	Date	Venue	Opponent	Score	Result	Competition
1.	23 November 2013	ETO Park, Győr, Hungary	Kazakhstan	2–1	4–1	2015 FIFA Women's World Cup qualification
2.	15 November 2022	Haladás Sportkomplexum, Szombathely, Hungary	Uzbekistan	5–0	5–0	Friendly
3.	7 April 2023	Alcufer Stadion, Győr, Hungary	Israel	1–1	3–1	Friendly
4.	7 April 2023	Alcufer Stadion, Győr, Hungary	Israel	3–1	3–1	Friendly
5.	5 December 2023	Hidegkuti Nándor Stadion, Budapest, Hungary	Albania	2–0	6–0	2023–24 UEFA Women's Nations League
6.	27 February 2024	Den Dreef, Leuven, Belgium	Belgium	1–0	1–5	2023–24 UEFA Women's Nations League play-off matches
7.	12 July 2024	Dalga Arena, Baku, Azerbaijan	Azerbaijan	2–0	5–0	UEFA Women's Euro 2025 qualifying
8.	16 July 2024	Ménfői úti Stadion, Győr, Hungary	Turkey	1–3	1–4	UEFA Women's Euro 2025 qualifying
9.	24 October 2025	Hidegkuti Nándor Stadion, Budapest, Hungary	Luxembourg	3–0	4–0	Friendly
10.	29 November 2025	Marbella Football Center, Marbella, Spain	Republic of Ireland	2–3	2–3	Friendly
11.	18 April 2026	Pancho Aréna, Felcsút, Hungary	North Macedonia	5–0	7–0	2027 FIFA Women's World Cup qualification
12.	9 June 2026	Illovszky Rudolf Stadion, Budapest, Hungary	Andorra	2–0	6–1	2027 FIFA Women's World Cup qualification

== Personal life ==
Her brother, Norbert Kaján, is a Hungarian international footballer who was also developed at Ferencváros. Her father was also a footballer, playing for Ganz-Mávag.
