= Bendegúz Kovács =

Hungarian footballer (born 2007)

Personal information
- Date of birth: 31 March 2007 (age 19)
- Place of birth: Fehérgyarmat, Hungary
- Position: Forward

Team information
- Current team: AZ
- Number: 18

Youth career
- 2015–2018: Fiatal Gyémántok
- 2018–2021: Debreceni VSC
- 2021–2023: SV ARC
- 2023–2025: Ajax
- 2025–2026: AZ

Senior career*
Years	Team	Apps	(Gls)
2025–	Jong AZ	20	(12)
2025–	AZ	7	(0)

International career^{‡}
2023	Hungary U16	5	(0)
2024	Hungary U17	2	(0)
2024–2025	Hungary U18	5	(2)
2025–	Hungary U19	10	(4)
2026–	Hungary U21	3	(0)
2026–	Hungary	2	(0)
- * Club domestic league appearances and goals as of 25 October 2026 ‡ National team caps and goals as of 01:12, 7 October 2026 (UTC)

Bendegúz Kovács (born 31 March 2007) is a Hungarian professional footballer who plays as a forward for Eredivisie club AZ and the Hungary national team.

== Club career ==
Born in Fehérgyarmat, Szabolcs–Szatmár–Bereg County, Kovács played for Hungarian clubs Fiatal Gyémántok in Nyíregyháza and Debreceni VSC, before moving to the Netherlands with his father. There he played with SV ARC, and later entered the Ajax Youth Academy.

=== Jong AZ ===
But after two seasons in Amsterdam, with no senior perspective with Ajax, he signed for their Eredivisie rivals AZ Alkmaar in the summer 2025.

Kovács made his professional debut with Jong AZ in a 3–2 Eerste Divisie loss to FC Eindhoven on 19 December 2025.

He soon established himself as a regular goalscorer with both the reserve and the under-19 in the UEFA Youth League.

=== AZ Alkmaar ===
He was listed in the adult team for the 2025–26 KNVB Cup final against NEC Nijmegen; however, he did not play. The match ended with a 5–1 victory for AZ Alkmaar.

He made his debut with AZ Alkmaar in a 2–2 draw against Shakhtar Donetsk in the quarter-final second leg of the 2025–26 UEFA Conference League season on 16 April 2026. He gave an assist with his head to Matěj Šín.

On 23 April 2026, he made his debut with AZ Alkmaar in the 2025–26 Eredivisie in a goalless draw against Go Ahead Eagles. Later that year, on 27 July, he extended his contract with the club until 2029.

== International career ==
Kovács is a youth international for Hungary, having played for the under-16, under-17, under-18 , under-19. He was called up to the Hungary national team for a set of friendlies in June 2026.

== Style of play ==
In an article, published on Nemzeti Sport, he was described as a future talent.

== Career statistics ==
=== Club ===
As of match played 25 October 2026

Appearances and goals by club, season and competition
Club	Season	League			Cup		Europe		Other		Total	
Club	Season	Division	Apps	Goals	Apps	Goals	Apps	Goals	Apps	Goals	Apps	Goals
Jong AZ	2025–26	Eerste Divisie	14	8	—		—		—		14	8
Jong AZ	2026–27	Eerste Divisie	6	4	—		—		—		6	4
Jong AZ	Total		20	12	—		—		—		20	12
AZ	2025–26	Eredivisie	3	0	0	0	1 (Note: Appearance in UEFA Conference League)	0	—		4	0
AZ	2026–27	Eredivisie	4	0	0	0	2 (Note: Appearances in UEFA Europa League)	0	—		6	0
AZ	Total		7	0	0	0	3	0	—		10	0
Career total			27	12	0	0	3	0	0	0	30	12

=== International ===
As of match played 9 June 2026

Appearances and goals by national team and year
National team	Year	Apps	Goals
Hungary	2026	2	0
Total		2	0

== Honours ==
AZ

- KNVB Cup: 2025–26
- Johan Cruyff Shield: 2026
