= Milica Kostić =

Serbian footballer (born 1997)

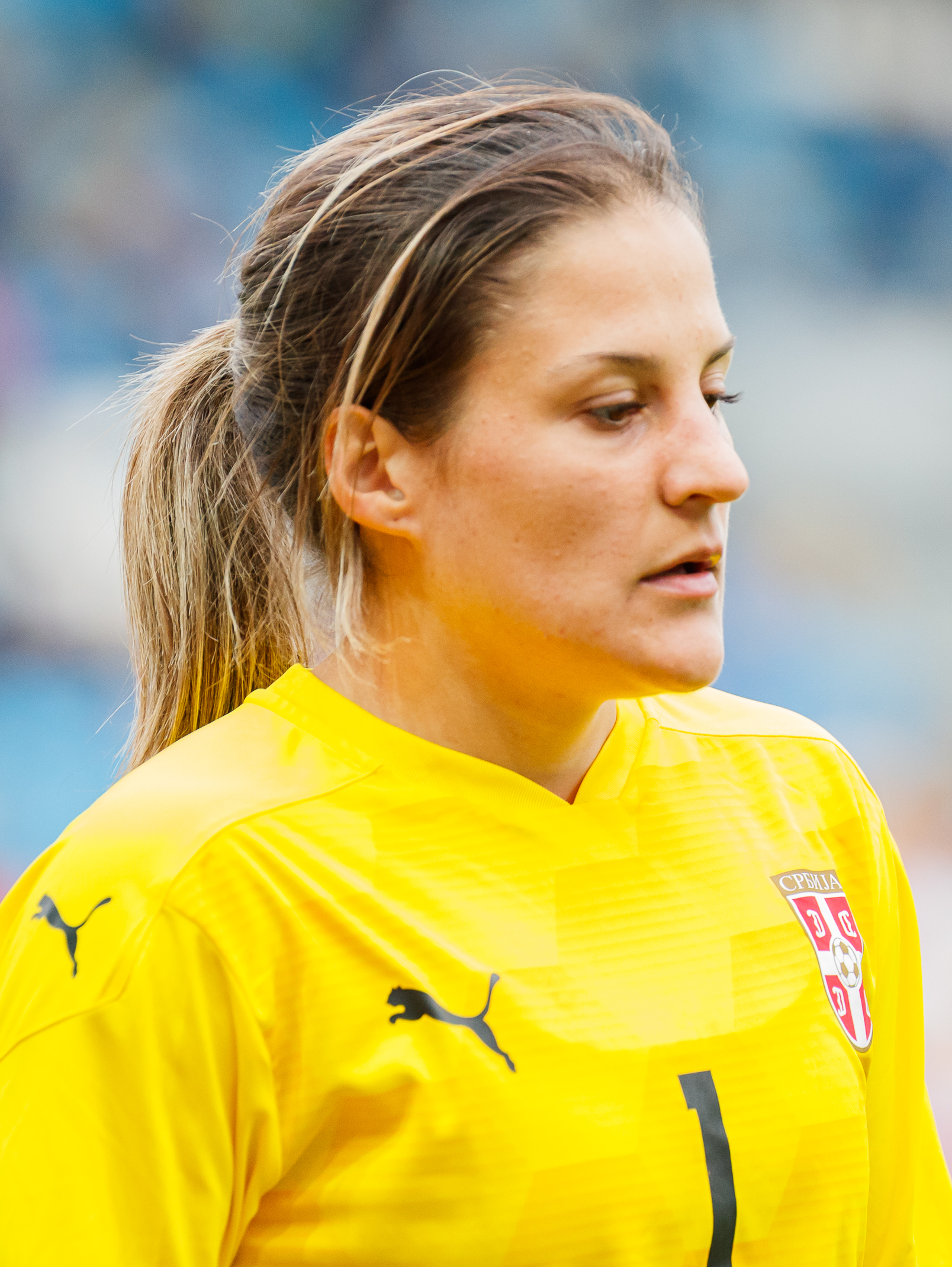
- Kostić with Serbia in 2021

Personal information
- Date of birth: 21 December 1997 (age 28)
- Place of birth: Serbia, FR Yugoslavia
- Height: 1.70 m (5 ft 7 in)
- Position: Goalkeeper

Team information
- Current team: Ferencvárosi

Senior career*
Years	Team	Apps	(Gls)
–2022	Spartak Subotica		(0)
2022	Eskilstuna United	6	(0)
2023–	Ferencvárosi		(0)

International career^{‡}
2016–	Serbia	37	(0)
- * Club domestic league appearances and goals as of 00:45, 8 September 2022 (UTC) ‡ National team caps and goals as of 18:23, 2 December 2023 (UTC)

Milica Kostić (Serbian Cyrillic: Милица Костић; born 21 December 1997) is a Serbian footballer who plays as a goalkeeper who plays for Hungarian club Ferencvárosi and has appeared for the Serbia women's national team.

== Career ==
Kostić has been capped for the Serbia national team, appearing for the team during the 2019 FIFA Women's World Cup qualifying cycle.
