= 2025–26 Győri ETO FC season =

Győri ETO
2025–26 season
- Győr crowned Hungarian football champions for the fifth time
- Owner: Oszkár Világi
- Manager: Balázs Borbély
- Stadium: ETO Park
- Nemzeti Bajnokság I: (gold) Winners (5th title)
- Magyar Kupa: Semi-final
- UEFA Conference League: Play-off round
- Top goalscorer: League: Benbouali (15); All: Benbouali (19)
- Highest home attendance: 8,360 (v Ferencváros, Nemzeti Bajnokság, R30, 19 April 2026)
- Lowest home attendance: 1,620 (v Pyunik, Conference League, QR2, 31 July 2025)
- Average home league attendance: 5,050
- Biggest win: 9 goals, (9–0) v Pilis (H), Magyar Kupa, Round of 32, 29 October 2025
- Biggest defeat: 2 goals, (0–2) v Rapid Wien (A), Conference League, Play-off round, 28 August 2025), (0–2) v Ferencváros (H), Nemzeti Bajnokság, R8, 28 September 2025)
- All statistics correct as of 16 May 2026 (completed).

The 2025–26 season is the 74th season in the history of Győri ETO FC, and the club's second consecutive season in the Nemzeti Bajnokság I. In addition to the domestic league, the team participates in the Magyar Kupa and the UEFA Conference League after coming 4th place in the previous Nemzeti Bajnokság I (domestic league) season.

Győri ETO after 11 years is participating in a European cup series again. In the second qualifying round, they beat the Armenian Pyunik 4–3 on aggregate. In the third qualifying round, they advanced against the Swedish AIK with a 3–2 aggregate. In the play-off round, they tried to reach the championship stage against the Austrian Rapid Wien, the aggregate score was 3–2 in favor of the Austrian team, thus ending their European cup competition.

== Kits ==
Supplier: Macron • Sponsor: Tippmix

Home	Home alt.	Away	Away alt.	Third

Goalkeeper^{1}	Goalkeeper^{2}

== First team squad ==
As of 23 February 2026

Note: Flags indicate national team as defined under FIFA eligibility rules; some limited exceptions apply. Players may hold more than one non-FIFA nationality.

No.	Pos.	Nation	Player
2	DF	ROU	Ștefan Vlădoiu
4	DF	SWE	Alexander Abrahamsson
5	MF	ROU	Paul Anton
6	MF	HUN	Rajmund Tóth
7	FW	ALG	Nadhir Benbouali
8	MF	HUN	László Vingler
9	FW	MNE	Matija Krivokapić
10	MF	ROU	Claudiu Bumba (captain)
11	FW	GAM	Nfansu Njie
16	GK	HUN	Balázs Megyeri
17	MF	HUN	Szabolcs Schön (on loan from (England) Bolton Wanderers)
18	DF	BEL	Senna Miangué
19	FW	UKR	Oleksandr Pyshchur
20	DF	HUN	Barnabás Bíró
21	DF	HUN	Márk Csinger (on loan from (Slovakia) DAC 1904)
23	DF	CRO	Daniel Štefulj

No.	Pos.	Nation	Player
24	DF	SRB	Miljan Krpić
25	DF	ROU	Deian Boldor
27	MF	HUN	Milán Vitális
39	MF	HUN	Marcell Herczeg
44	MF	TOG	Samsondin Ouro
47	MF	HUN	Ádám Décsy
50	DF	HUN	Martin Kulcsár
55	FW	CAN	Nathaniel Mascoe Lawrenzo
64	GK	HUN	Dániel Brecska
70	MF	HUN	Imre Tollár
76	FW	AUT	Jovan Živković
80	FW	SRB	Željko Gavrić
90	MF	HUN	Kevin Bánáti
96	FW	HUN	Marcell Huszár
99	GK	SVK	Samuel Petráš

== Transfers ==
=== Summer ===
In
Date	No.	Pos.	Nat.	Player	Moving from	Fee	Ref.
20 June 2025	16	GK	Hungary	Balázs Megyeri	Debrecen	Free agent	
22 June 2025	4	DF	Sweden	Alexander Abrahamsson	Zagłębie Lubin	Free agent	
23 June 2025	19	FW	Ukraine	Oleksandr Pyshchur	Gyirmót (NB II)	Free agent	
17 July 2025	14	FW	Algeria	Nadhir Benbouali	Charleroi	Contract after loan expiry	
20 July 2025	76	FW	Austria	Jovan Živković	Rapid Wien	Undisclosed	
3 August 2025	2	DF	Romania	Ștefan Vlădoiu	Kolos Kovalivka	Undisclosed	
3 October 2025	18	DF	Belgium	Senna Miangué	Cercle Brugge	Free agent	

Loaned from
Date	No.	Pos.	Nat.	Player	Moving from	Until	Ref.
2 August 2025	21	DF	Hungary	Márk Csinger	DAC 1904	30 June 2026	
1 September 2025	17	MF	Hungary	Szabolcs Schön	Bolton Wanderers	30 June 2026	

Return from loan
Date	No.	Pos.	Nat.	Player	Moving from	Division	Ref.
2 July 2025		N/A	Hungary	Bálint Csóka	Šamorín FC	2. Liga (Slovakia)	
2 July 2025		N/A	Hungary	Dávid Koncz	Šamorín FC	2. Liga (Slovakia)	
2 July 2025		N/A	Hungary	Balázs Farkas	Budapest Honvéd	Nemzeti Bajnokság II	
2 July 2025		N/A	Hungary	Marcell Huszár	Diósgyőr	Nemzeti Bajnokság I	
2 July 2025	9	N/A	Montenegro	Matija Krivokapić	Komárno	Slovak First Football League	
2 July 2025		N/A	Hungary	Alex Lacza	Kozármisleny	Nemzeti Bajnokság II	

Permanently after the loan expires
Date	No.	Pos.	Nat.	Player	Moving from	Ref.
21 July 2025	27	MF	Hungary	Milán Vitális	DAC 1904	
21 July 2025	80	FW	Serbia	Željko Gavrić	DAC 1904	

Out
Date	No.	Pos.	Nat.	Player	Moving to	Fee	Ref.
2 June 2025	19	DF	Slovakia	János Szépe	MTK	Contracts expire	
27 June 2025	14	FW	Algeria	Nadhir Benbouali	Charleroi	Return from loan	
27 June 2025	33	DF	Albania	Eneo Bitri	Vålerenga	Return from loan	
27 June 2025	92	MF	Slovakia	Michal Škvarka	Győri ETO FC B-team (NB III)	Free	
30 June 2025	7	DF	Mali	Mamady Diarra	Sheriff Tiraspol	Contracts expire	
1 July 2025	22	DF	Albania	Albion Marku	TBD	Contracts expire	
16 July 2025	3	DF	Brazil	Heitor	Maccabi Tel Aviv	Undisclosed	
20 September 2025	77	MF	Tunisia	Wajdi Sahli	Radnički 1923	Undisclosed	

Out on loan
Date	No.	Pos.	Nat.	Player	Moving to	Loan date	Ref.
15 July 2025	13	DF	Portugal	Fábio Vianna	Sepsi OSK	30 June 2026	

=== Winter ===
Out on loan
Date	No.	Pos.	Nat.	Player	Moving to	Loan date	Ref.
23 February 2026	37	DF	Slovakia	Norbert Urblík	Šamorín	30 June 2026	

=== New contracts ===
Date	No.	Pos.	Nat.	Player	Until	Ref.
14 July 2025		N/A	Hungary	Dominik Csorba	Undisclosed	
14 July 2025		N/A	Hungary	Imre Tollár	Undisclosed	
12 August 2025		N/A	Hungary	Ármin Garamszegi-Géczy	Undisclosed	

=== Contract extension ===
Date	No.	Pos.	Nat.	Player	Extension to	Ref.
1 July 2025	25	DF	Romania	Deian Boldor	30 June 2026	
1 July 2025	23	DF	Croatia	Daniel Štefulj	30 June 2028	
16 July 2025	10	MF	Romania	Claudiu Bumba	30 June 2026	

=== Kit number changes ===
Date	Pos.	Nat.	Player	Old	Round	New	Round
18 October 2025	MF	Hungary	László Vingler	18	until Nemzeti Bajnokság, Round 9	8	from Nemzeti Bajnokság, Round 10

== Friendlies ==
=== Pre-season ===
28 June 2025 Friendly	Győri ETO	1–1	(Czech Republic) Artis Brno (Czech II)	Győr
	Pyshchur			Stadium: ETO Park; Attendance: 400
Note: • Győri ETO 1st half: Petráš — Beqja, Heitor, Boldor, Štefulj — Anton, Décsy, Gavrić — Huszár, Njie, Bumba • Győri ETO 2nd half: Megyeri — Ba. Bíró, Abrahamsson, Krpić, Grozdanić — Vingler, Ouro, Vitális — Bánáti, Pyshchur, Seraphin • Manager: Balázs Borbély

5 July 2025 Friendly	TSC (Serbian I) (Serbia)	1–3	Győri ETO	Dunajská Streda
	Mboungou 6'	Report	Gavrić 14'; Anton 27'; Bumba 67'	Stadium: MOL Academy
Note: • Győri ETO for 60th min.: Megyeri — Ba. Bíró, Krpić, Boldor, Štefulj, Anton, Décsy, Herczeg, Gavrić, Huszár, Pyshchur • Győri ETO from 61st min.: Petráš — R. Tóth, Heitor, Abrahamsson, Vianna, Vingler, Vitális, Bánáti, Seraphin, Bumba, Njie • Manager: Balázs Borbély

28 June 2025 Friendly	Győri ETO	0–2	(Israel) Maccabi Haifa (Israeli I)	Győr
			Haziza 13'; Abdoulaye 17'	Stadium: ETO Park; Attendance: 0 (behind closed doors); Referee: Drabon
Note: • Győri ETO for 60th min.: Petráš — R. Tóth, Heitor, Krpić (Boldor (substituted on) 46'), Vianna (Štefulj (substituted on) 46') — Vitális, Décsy (Gavrić (substituted on) 46'), Vingler — Bumba, Njie, Bánáti • Győri ETO from 61st min.: Megyeri — Ba. Bíró, Heitor, Boldor, Štefulj — Ouro, Gavrić, Anton — Huszár, Pyshchur, Herczeg • Manager: Balázs Borbély

Summer training camp in Bad Radkersburg, Austria, from 13 July to 18 July 2025:

18 July 2025 Friendly	Karpaty Lviv (Ukrainian I) (Ukraine)	1–2	Győri ETO	Söchau
	Bruninho 9'	Report	Bumba 10'; Vitális 85'	Attendance: 100
Note: • Győri ETO: Petráš — R. Tóth, Abrahamsson, Krpić, Štefulj (Ba. Bíró (substituted on) 67') — Vitális, Gavrić (Lawrenzo (substituted on) 83'), Anton — Bumba, Benbouali (Pyshchur (substituted on) 46'), Bánáti (Tollár (substituted on) 70') • Manager: Balázs Borbély

Note: As these are warm-up matches, dates and opponents may change.

=== Mid-season ===
10 January 2026 Friendly	Partizan Beograd (Serbian I) (Serbia)	2–2	Győri ETO	Antalya, Turkey
14:00	Ninić 8'; Janković 18'	Report	Gavrić 27'; Njie 80'	Stadium: Calista Football Center; Attendance: 100
Note: • Győri ETO 1st half: Petráš — Vlădoiu, Urblík, Miangué, Schön, Krpić, Décsy, Gavrić, Bánáti, Benbouali, Živković • Győri ETO 2nd half: Megyeri — Ba. Bíró, Csinger, Boldor, Štefulj, Szarka, Vitális, Tollár, Njie, Pyshchur, Bumba • Manager: Balázs Borbély

13 January 2026 Friendly	Osijek (Croatian I) (Croatia)	2–1	Győri ETO	Antalya, Turkey
14:30	Teklić 45+1'; Ježić (yellow card) 90+2'; Mikolčić 90+30'		Štefulj 7'; Szarka (yellow card) 45+14'	Stadium: Calista Football Center
Note: 2x60 minutes playing time • Győri ETO 1st half: Megyeri — Vlădoiu, Krpić, Miangué (Szarka (substituted on) 20'), Štefulj — Vitális, Csinger — Bánáti, Gavrić, Njie — Benbouali • Győri ETO 2nd half: Petráš (Brecska (substituted on) 90+17') — Ba. Bíró, Urblík, Boldor, Csorba — Csinger, Décsy — Schön, Tollár, Živković — Pyshchur • Manager: Balázs Borbély

18 January 2026 Friendly	Győri ETO	0–7	(Slovakia) Komárno (Slovak I)	Győr
11:00			Palan 33'; Domonkos 43'; Bayemi 52'; Krcik 55'; Mashike 61'; Žák 65' (pen.); T. Németh 71'
Note: • Győri ETO FC Academy Team: Brecska — Szarka, Urblík, Koncz, Black, M. Kiss, Conte, Pálfalvi, Živković, Garamszegy-Géczi, Lacza • Substitutions: Lukácsy, Algács, Szerémi, Csala, Simark, Macdonald, Bot. Varga • Manager: Ádám Nagy

18 January 2026 Friendly	Rapid Wien (Austrian I) (Austria)	0–2	Győri ETO	Vienna, Austria
14:30		Report	Raux-Yao 43' (o.g.); Boldor 89'	Stadium: Rapid Trainingszentrum
Note: • Győri ETO: Megyeri (Petráš (substituted on) 46') — Vlădoiu, Csinger, Krpić, Štefulj — Vingler (Boldor), Vitális — Gavrić (Tollár (substituted on) 86'), Bánáti (Pyshchur), Bumba (Schön (substituted on) 59') — Njie (Ba. Bíró (substituted on) 86') • Manager: Balázs Borbély

== Competitions ==
=== Overall record ===
In italics, we indicate the Last match and the Final position achieved in competition(s) that have not yet been completed.

Competition	First match	Last match	Starting round	Final position	Record							
Competition	First match	Last match	Starting round	Final position	Pld	W	D	L	GF	GA	GD	Win %
Nemzeti Bajnokság I	27 July 2025	2 May 2026	Matchday 1	Winners	33	20	9	4	65	30	+35	60.61
Magyar Kupa	13 September 2025	22 April 2026	Round of 64	Semi-final	5	4	1	0	19	3	+16	80.00
UEFA Conference League	24 July 2025	28 August 2025	2nd qualifying round	Play-off round	6	3	0	3	9	8	+1	50.00
Total					44	27	10	7	93	41	+52	61.36

Last updated: 16 May 2026
Source: Soccerway

=== Nemzeti Bajnokság I ===
==== League table ====
Pos	Team	Pld	W	D	L	GF	GA	GD	Pts	Qualification or relegation
1	Győr (C)	33	20	9	4	65	30	+35	69	Qualification for the Champions League first qualifying round
2	Ferencváros	33	21	5	7	67	31	+36	68	Qualification for the Europa League first qualifying round (Note: The 2025–26 Magyar Kupa winners (Ferencváros) qualify for the Europa League first qualifying round.)
3	Paks	33	15	8	10	63	46	+17	53	Qualification for the Conference League second qualifying round
4	Debrecen	33	14	11	8	51	41	+10	53	Qualification for the Conference League second qualifying round
5	Zalaegerszeg	33	13	9	11	49	43	+6	48	

Source: Hungarian Football Federation (in Hungarian)
Rules for classification: 1) Points; 2) Matches won; 3) Goal difference; 4) Goals scored; 5) Head-to-head points; 6) Head-to-head goal difference; 7) Fair play ranking; 8) Drawing of lots.
(C) Champions

==== Results summary ====
Overall								Home						Away					
Pld	W	D	L	GF	GA	GD	Pts	W	D	L	GF	GA	GD	W	D	L	GF	GA	GD
33	20	9	4	66	31	+35	69	10	4	2	24	10	+14	10	5	2	42	21	+21

Last updated: 16 May 2026.
Source: Soccerway

==== Matches ====
Win Draw Loss Fixtures Postponed

The draw for the 2025/26 season was held on 16 June 2025.

26 July 2025 1	Paks	3–3	Győri ETO	Paks
18:00 CEST	Simon (yellow card) 28'; Gyurkits 39' (yellow card) 66'; B. Tóth 64' (yellow card) 90+1'; Windecker 85' (pen.)	Report	Boldor 30'; Ouro 45+1' (pen.); Benbouali (yellow card) 54'; R. Tóth (yellow card) 56' (yellow-red card) 70'; Njie 67'; Vingler (yellow card) 77'	Stadium: Fehérvári úti Stadion; Attendance: 2,679; Referee: Péter Zierkelbach; Assistant referees: József Aradi, Bence Belicza
Note: • Győri ETO: Petráš — Ba. Bíró (R. Tóth (substituted on) 46'), Krpić, Boldor (Abrahamsson (substituted on) 69'), Štefulj — Vingler (Décsy (substituted on) 90'), Vitális, Ouro — Njie (Gavrić (substituted on) 69'), Benbouali (Pyshchur (substituted on) 73'), Bumba (c) • Manager: Borbély; Player of the match: Barna Tóth, Paks 8.3 • Best player of Győri ETO: Nfansu Njie 7.7

3 August 2025 2	Győri ETO	1–1	Újpest	Győr
20:00 CEST	Njie (yellow card) 32'; Benbouali (yellow card) 48'; Vingler (yellow card) 81'; Pyshchur 90+4'	Report	Fiola (yellow card) 1'; Ljujić (yellow card) 22'; Lacoux (red card) 40'; Ademi (yellow card) 70'; Duarte (yellow card) 78'; Beridze 89'	Stadium: ETO Park; Attendance: 5,410; Referee: Marcell Derdák; Assistant referees: Georgiou Theodoros, Dávid Rózsa
Note: • Győri ETO: Petráš — Ba. Bíró (Vlădoiu (substituted on) 72'), Krpić, Csinger, Štefulj — Anton (c), Décsy (Vingler (substituted on) 72') — Njie (Bánáti (substituted on) 52'), Gavrić (Tollár (substituted on) 72'), Bumba — Benbouali (Pyshchur (substituted on) 86') • Manager: Borbély • Player of the match: Giorgi Beridze, Újpest 7.6 • Best player of Győri ETO: Pyshchur 7.6

10 August 2025 3	Zalaegerszeg	1–1	Győri ETO	Zalaegerszeg
17:45 CEST	Skribek 20' (pen.)	Report	Pyshchur (yellow card) 5'; Boldor (yellow card) 19'; Živković (yellow card) 77'; Huszár 81'	Stadium: ZTE Arena; Attendance: 3,463; Referee: József Erdős; Assistant referees: Péter Ország, Viktor Nagy
Note: • Győri ETO: Petráš — Vlădoiu, Abrahamsson (Csinger (substituted on) 56'), Boldor, Štefulj — Vingler, Ouro (c) (Benbouali (substituted on) 56') — Bánáti (R. Tóth (substituted on) 56'), Tollár (Živković (substituted on) 74'), Pyshchur (Huszár (substituted on) 74') — Vitális • Manager: Borbély • Player of the match: Joseth Peraza, Zalaegerszeg 7.8 • Best player of Győri ETO: Marcell Huszár 7.5

17 August 2025 4	MTK	2–7	Győri ETO	Budapest
17:45 CEST	R. Molnár 31'; Kádár (yellow card) 39'; P. Kovács (yellow card) 43'; Jurina 60'; Vitályos (yellow card) 61' (yellow-red card) 65'	Report	Štefulj 15' (yellow card) 35'; Krpić 29'; Vitális 33'; Benbouali 45+2', 68'; Huszár 77'; Pyshchur 82'	Stadium: Hidegkuti Nándor Stadion; Attendance: 1,954; Referee: Attila Molnár; Assistant referees: Balázs Szert, József Aradi
Note: • Győri ETO: Petráš — R. Tóth, Krpić, Csinger, Štefulj (Tollár (substituted on) 84') — Gavrić (Ouro (substituted on) 46'), Vitális, Vingler — Bánáti (Vlădoiu (substituted on) 54'), Benbouali (Pyshchur (substituted on) 73'), Bumba (c) (Huszár (substituted on) 73') • Manager: Borbély • Player of the match: Nadhir Benbouali, Győri ETO 9.3 • Best player of MTK: Marin Jurina 8.3

31 August 2025 6	Győri ETO	1–0	Nyíregyháza	Győr
17:30 CEST	Abrahamsson (yellow card) 55'; Benbouali 85'	Report	Májer (yellow card) 83'; Farkas (yellow card) 90+2'	Stadium: ETO Park; Attendance: 3,340; Referee: Gergő Bogár; Assistant referees: Dániel Szalai, Dávid Rózsa
Note: • Győri ETO: Petráš — R. Tóth (Ba. Bíró (substituted on) 84'), Abrahamsson, Csinger, Štefulj — Anton (c) — Živković (Tollár (substituted on) 58'), Vitális, Gavrić (Vingler (substituted on) 87'), Bumba — Pyshchur (Benbouali (substituted on) 58') • Manager: Borbély • Player of the match: Paul Anton, Győri ETO 8.6 • Best player of Nyíregyháza: Levente Katona 6.9

20 September 2025 7	Puskás Akadémia	0–2	Győri ETO	Felcsút
20:15 CEST	Zs. Nagy (yellow card) 48'; Maceiras (yellow card) 58'	Report	Anton 12' (pen.); Benbouali 24'; Gavrić (yellow card) 62'; R. Tóth (yellow card) 82'	Stadium: Pancho Aréna; Attendance: 2,739; Referee: Balázs Berke; Assistant referees: Gergő Vígh-Tarsonyi, József Aradi
Note: • Győri ETO: Petráš — Ba. Bíró (Bánáti (substituted on) 75'), Abrahamsson (Boldor (substituted on) 84'), Csinger, Štefulj — Anton (c) — Bumba, Vitális, Gavrić (Njie (substituted on) 67'), Schön (Vlădoiu (substituted on) 75') — Benbouali (R. Tóth (substituted on) 75') • Manager: Borbély • Player of the match: Paul Anton, Győri ETO 8.0 • Best player of Puskás Akadémia: Michael Okeke 8.0

28 September 2025 8	Győri ETO	0–2	Ferencváros	Győr
18:00 CEST	Gavrić (yellow card) 58'; Vingler (yellow card) 88'	Report	Levi 18'; Ötvös (yellow card) 29'; B. Varga 64'; Tóth (yellow card) 64'	Stadium: ETO Park; Attendance: 8,280; Referee: Tamás Bognár; Assistant referees: Gergely Becséri, Dávid Rózsa
Note: • Győri ETO: Petráš — Vlădoiu (Štefulj (substituted on) 70'), Abrahamsson, Csinger, Vitális — Anton (c) (Vingler (substituted on) 87'), Bánáti (Ba. Bíró (substituted on) 70') — Schön, R. Tóth (Gavrić (substituted on) 46'), Bumba (Njie (substituted on) 87') — Benbouali • Manager: Borbély • Player of the match: Toon Raemaekers, Ferencváros 7.9 • Best player of Győri ETO: Nadhir Benbouali 7.2

4 October 2025 9	Debrecen	1–1	Győri ETO	Debrecen
19:30 CEST	Mejias (yellow card) 26'; Youga (yellow card) 48'; Dzsudzsák 49'	Report	Benbouali (yellow card) 22'; Štefulj (yellow card) 48'; Anton 66' (pen.)	Stadium: Nagyerdei Stadion; Attendance: 5,077; Referee: Ferenc Karakó; Assistant referees: Balázs Szalai, Dániel Szalai
Note: • Győri ETO: Petráš — R. Tóth, Abrahamsson, Csinger, Štefulj — Anton (c), Vitális — Bánáti (Vingler (substituted on) 67'), Gavrić (Schön (substituted on) 40'), Bumba (Njie (substituted on) 90+2') — Benbouali • Manager: Borbély • Player of the match: Balázs Dzsudzsák, Debrecen 8.4 • Best player of Győri ETO: Paul Anton 8.2

18 October 2025 10	Győri ETO	3–1	Diósgyőr	Győr
20:30 CEST	Benbouali 29'; Bumba 43'; R. Tóth (yellow card) 59'; Szatmári 74' (o.g.); Huszár (yellow card) 89'	Report	D. Gera 13'; Acolatse (yellow card) 64'; Vallejo (yellow card) 67'; Demeter (yellow card) 90'	Stadium: ETO Park; Attendance: 3,210; Referee: József Erdős; Assistant referees: István Albert, Bence Belicza
Note: • Győri ETO: Petráš — R. Tóth, Boldor, Csinger, Štefulj — Vitális, Anton (c) — Schön (Vingler (substituted on) 68'), Bumba (Njie (substituted on) 89'), Bánáti (Huszár (substituted on) 81') — Benbouali (Pyshchur (substituted on) 89') • Manager: Borbély • Player of the match: Balázs Dzsudzsák, Győri ETO 8.9 • Best player of Diósgyőr: Dániel Gera 7.2

26 October 2025 11	Kisvárda	3–2	Győri ETO	Kisvárda
12:45 CET	D. Soltész (yellow card) 41'; Novothny 45+2'; Chlumecký (yellow card) 66'; Be. Bíró 73'; G. Molnár 89'	Report	Benbouali 14'; Bumba 19'; Pyshchur (yellow card) 84'	Stadium: Várkerti Stadion; Attendance: 2,521; Referee: Gergő Bogár; Assistant referees: Gergely Becséri, Dávid Rózsa
Note: • Győri ETO: Petráš — R. Tóth, Boldor, Csinger (Abrahamsson (substituted on) 46'), Štefulj — Anton (c), Vitális — Bánáti (Vingler (substituted on) 46'), Bumba, Schön (Pyshchur (substituted on) 70') — Benbouali (Njie (substituted on) 70') • Manager: Borbély • Player of the match: Soma Novothny, Kisvárda 7.8 • Best player of Győri ETO: Nadhir Benbouali 7.5

1 November 2025 12	Győri ETO	0–0	Paks	Győr
15:30 CET	Benbouali (yellow card) 21'; Schön (yellow card) 26'; Bánáti (yellow card) 30'; Bumba (yellow card) 74'	Report	Papp (yellow card) 44'; Lenzsér (red card) 66'; Windecker (yellow card) 74'	Stadium: ETO Park; Attendance: 5,099; Referee: Marcell Derdák; Assistant referees: Balázs Huszár, Gergely Becséri
Note: • Győri ETO: Petráš — R. Tóth, Abrahamsson, Csinger, Štefulj — Anton (c), Vitális — Bánáti (Huszár (substituted on) 78'), Bumba (Pyshchur (substituted on) 90'), Schön (Njie (substituted on) 78') — Benbouali • Manager: Borbély • Player of the match: Daniel Štefulj, Győri ETO 8.0 • Best player of Paks: Kristóf Papp 7.6

8 November 2025 13	Újpest	0–3	Győri ETO	Budapest
12:45 CET	Fiola (yellow card) 60'; Gonçalves (yellow card) 85'	Report	Schön 28'; Benbouali 59', 71'	Stadium: Szusza Ferenc Stadion; Attendance: 4,743; Referee: Tamás Bognár; Assistant referees: Balázs Buzás, Péter Garai
Note: • Győri ETO: Petráš — R. Tóth, Abrahamsson, Csinger, Štefulj — Anton (c) (Vingler (substituted on) 84') — Schön (Živković (substituted on) 87'), Vitális, Bumba (Njie (substituted on) 84'), Bánáti (Huszár (substituted on) 73') — Benbouali (Gavrić (substituted on) 84')• Manager: Borbély • Player of the match: Szabolcs Schön, Győri ETO 8.9 • Best player of Újpest: Riccardo Piscitelli 7.9

21 November 2025 14	Győri ETO	0–1	Zalaegerszeg	Győr
20:00 CET	Vitális (yellow card) 60'; Vlădoiu (yellow card) 74'	Report	Szendrei (yellow card) 53'; Várkonyi (yellow card) 55'; João Victor (yellow card) 68'; Bakti 82'	Stadium: ETO Park; Attendance: 1,906; Referee: Bence Csonka dr. Assistant referees: Georgiou Theodoros, József Aradi
Note: • Győri ETO: Petráš — R. Tóth (Vlădoiu (substituted on) 71'), Abrahamsson, Csinger, Štefulj — Vitális, Anton (c) (Gavrić (substituted on) 77') — Schön, Bumba (Pyshchur (substituted on) 86'), Bánáti (Huszár (substituted on) 71') — Benbouali • Manager: Borbély • Player of the match: Bence Gundel-Takács, Zalaegerszeg 8.5 • Best player of Győri ETO: Szabolcs Schön 7.7

29 November 2025 15	Győri ETO	3–0	MTK	Győr
16:15 CET	Benbouali 45'; Vitális (yellow card) 66'; Bánáti 81'; Gavrić 90+1'	Report	H. Németh (red card) 43'	Stadium: ETO Park; Attendance: 4,220; Referee: József Erdős; Assistant referees: Balázs Buzás, Bence Belicza
Note: • Győri ETO: Petráš — R. Tóth, Krpić (Miangué (substituted on) 88'), Csinger, Štefulj — Gavrić, Anton (c), Vitális (Vingler (substituted on) 74') — Bumba (Schön (substituted on) 74'), Benbouali (Pyshchur (substituted on) 88'), Bánáti (Huszár (substituted on) 88') • Manager: Borbély • Player of the match: Paul Anton, Győri ETO 8.9 • Best player of MTK: Tamás Kádár 7.5

3 December 2025 5	Kazincbarcika	1–3	Győri ETO	Mezőkövesd
18:00 CET	Major (yellow card) 7'; Makrai 46'; Deutsch (yellow card) 66'; Szőke (yellow card) 84'	Report	Vlădoiu (yellow card) 16'; Vingler (yellow card) 29' (yellow-red card) 77'; Vitális 36'; Bánáti 61'; Gavrić 74'	Stadium: Városi Stadion; Attendance: 292; Referee: Bence Csonka dr. Assistant referees: Balázs Buzás, Balázs Szert
Note: • Győri ETO: Megyeri — Vlădoiu, Miangué, Csinger, Štefulj — Vitális (c) (Anton (substituted on) 69'), Vingler — Bánáti (Huszár (substituted on) 88'), Gavrić (Krpić (substituted on) 81'), Schön (Bumba (substituted on) 69') — Benbouali (Njie (substituted on) 81') • Manager: Borbély • Player of the match: Balázs Megyeri, Győri ETO 8.4 • Best player of Kazincbarcika: Gábor Makrai 7.6

7 December 2025 16	Győri ETO	3–1	Kazincbarcika	Győr
13:15 CET	Gavrić 18'; Štefulj 44'; Huszár 90+1'	Report	Rácz 56'; Kártik (yellow card) 77'	Stadium: ETO Park; Attendance: 3,960; Referee: Mihály Káprály; Assistant referees: Dávid Rózsa, Viktor Nagy
Note: • Győri ETO: Petráš — Vlădoiu, Csinger, Krpić, Štefulj — Anton (c) — Bánáti (Huszár (substituted on) 70'), Gavrić (Njie (substituted on) 86'), Vitális (B. Tóth (substituted on) 86'), Bumba (Schön (substituted on) 70') — Benbouali (Pyshchur (substituted on) 90+2') • Manager: Borbély • Player of the match: Daniel Štefulj, Győri ETO 9.2 • Best player of Kazincbarcika: László Rácz 7.3

13 December 2025 17	Nyíregyháza	0–1	Győri ETO	Nyíregyháza
14:00 CET	Benczenleitner (yellow card) 22'; Toma (yellow card) 89'	Report	Gavrić 66'; Vitális (yellow card) 79'; Njie (yellow card) 90'; Huszár (yellow card) 90'; Schön (yellow card) 90+3'	Stadium: Városi Stadion; Attendance: 4,043; Referee: Tamás Bognár; Assistant referees: Péter Kóbor, Balázs Huszár
Note: • Győri ETO: Megyeri — R. Tóth, Csinger, Krpić, Štefulj (Vlădoiu (substituted on) 46') — Vitális, Anton (c), Gavrić (Njie (substituted on) 83') — Bánáti (Huszár (substituted on) 83'), Benbouali (Pyshchur (substituted on) 89'), Bumba (Schön (substituted on) 61') • Manager: Borbély • Player of the match: Balázs Megyeri, Győri ETO 10.0 • Best player of Nyíregyháza: Dániel Kovács 7.4

20 December 2025 18	Győri ETO	2–0	Puskás Akadémia	Győr
18:00 CET	Benbouali 1'; Krpić (yellow card) 41'; Vingler (yellow card) 53'; Njie 83'}	Report	Szolnoki (yellow card) 20'; P. Dárdai (yellow card) 38'; Okeke (yellow card) 52'; Favorov (yellow card) 67'; L. Duarte (yellow card) 72'	Stadium: ETO Park; Attendance: 4,219; Referee: Péter Antal; Assistant referees: Péter Kóbor, Ákos Berényi
Note: • Győri ETO: Megyeri — Vlădoiu, Csinger, Krpić, Schön — Vitális (Živković (substituted on) 90+1'), Vingler — Bánáti (Huszár (substituted on) 74'), Gavrić (R. Tóth (substituted on) 87'), Bumba (c) (Njie (substituted on) 74') — Benbouali • Manager: Borbély • Player of the match: Ștefan Vlădoiu, Győri ETO 8.0 • Best player of Puskás Akadémia: Péter Szappanos 7.1

25 January 2026 19	Ferencváros	1–3	Győri ETO	Budapest
18:15 CET	Kovačević 49'; Ötvös (yellow card) 88'	Report	Schön (yellow card) 33'; Vitális (yellow card) 40'; Benbouali 61'; Krpić (yellow card) 67'; Bumba 72'; Štefulj 86'	Stadium: Groupama Aréna; Attendance: 8,675; Referee: Balázs Berke; Assistant referees: Georgiou Theodoros, Balázs Szert
Note: • Győri ETO: Megyeri — Vlădoiu (R. Tóth (substituted on) 56'), Csinger (Boldor (substituted on) 46'), Krpić, Štefulj — Vitális (c), Vingler — Schön (Njie (substituted on) 56'), Gavrić (Bánáti (substituted on) 83'), Bumba (Huszár (substituted on) 90') — Benbouali • Manager: Borbély • Player of the match: Nadhir Benbouali, Győri ETO 8.2 • Best player of Ferencváros: Gabi Kanichowsky 7.7

31 January 2026 20	Győri ETO	2–2	Debrecen	Győr
16:00 CET	Csinger (yellow card) 19'; Gavrić (yellow card) 54'; Vitális 65' (pen.), 90+3' (pen.); Krpić (yellow card) 69'	Report	Szuhodovszki 38'; Komáromi 50'; B. Vajda (yellow card) 64'; Mejias (yellow card) 72'; Gordić (yellow card) 87'	Stadium: ETO Park; Attendance: 5,059; Referee: Márton Rúsz; Assistant referees: Péter Garai, Ákos Berényi
Note: • Győri ETO: Megyeri — Vlădoiu, Csinger, Krpić, Štefulj — Vingler (R. Tóth (substituted on) 81'), Vitális (c) — Bánáti (Njie (substituted on) 46'), Gavrić (Schön (substituted on) 57'), Bumba (Pyshchur (substituted on) 81') — Benbouali • Manager: Borbély (yellow card) (yellow-red card) 90+10' • Player of the match: Milán Vitális, Győri ETO 9.3 • Best player of Debrecen: Soma Szuhodovszki 7.9

7 February 2026 21	Diósgyőr	1–1	Győri ETO	Miskolc
12:45 CET	Bárdos (yellow card) 35'; Holdampf (yellow card) 40'; Colley (yellow card) 43' (goal) 63'; Bokros (yellow card) 60'; Má. Mucsányi (yellow card) 90+3'	Report	Krpić (yellow card) 29'; Njie 37'	Stadium: Diósgyőri Stadion; Attendance: 973; Referee: Péter Antal; Assistant referees: Georgiou Theodoros, Viktor Nagy
Note: • Győri ETO: Megyeri — R. Tóth, Csinger, Krpić, Štefulj — Vingler, Vitális (c) — Njie (Bánáti (substituted on) 80'), Gavrić (Pyshchur (substituted on) 83'), Bumba (Schön (substituted on) 66') — Benbouali • Interim manager: Thijs • Player of the match: Lamin Colley, Diósgyőr 8.5 • Best player of Győri ETO: Balázs Megyeri 8.2

15 February 2026 22	Győri ETO	1–0	Kisvárda	Győr
17:45 CET	Schön 23'; Štefulj (yellow card) 48'	Report	Oláh (yellow card) 49'; Cipetić (yellow card) 65'; Szőr (yellow card) 72'	Stadium: ETO Park; Attendance: 4,087; Referee: Tamás Bognár; Assistant referees: Péter Kóbor, Balázs Huszár
Note: • Győri ETO: Megyeri — Ba. Bíró (Urblík (substituted on) 90+1'), Csinger, Krpić, Štefulj — R. Tóth, Vitális (c) (Pyshchur (substituted on) 90+1') — Bánáti (Bumba (substituted on) 64'), Gavrić (Boldor (substituted on) 78'), Schön — Benbouali • Manager: Borbély • Player of the match: Szabolcs Schön, Győri ETO 9.4 • Best player of Kisvárda: Sinan Medgyes 7.6

22 February 2026 23	Paks	3–4	Győri ETO	Paks
17:30 CET	Gyurkits (yellow card) 40'; B. Tóth 42' (yellow card) 80'; Lenzsér (yellow card) 43'; B. Balogh 78'; Ádám 85' (pen.)	Report	Schön 20', 33' (yellow card) 43'; Vitális 25'; Csinger 73'; Krpić (yellow card) 76'; R. Tóth (yellow card) 88'	Stadium: Fehérvári úti Stadion; Attendance: 2,301; Referee: Péter Antal; Assistant referees: Balázs Buzás, József Aradi
Note: • Győri ETO: Megyeri — Ba. Bíró, Csinger, Krpić, Štefulj (Miangué (substituted on) 90') — Vitális (c), R. Tóth, Gavrić (Boldor (substituted on) 90') — Njie (Bánáti (substituted on) 54'), Benbouali, Schön (Bumba (substituted on) 68') • Manager: Borbély • Player of the match: Milán Vitális, Győri ETO 8.4 • Best player of Paks: Barna Tóth 7.6

28 February 2026 24	Győri ETO	2–1	Újpest	Győr
19:30 CET	Miangué (yellow card) 31'; R. Tóth (yellow card) 52'; Gavrić 61'; João Nunes 83' (o.g.); Vitális (yellow card) 90+2'	Report	Vlijter (yellow card) 45'; Brodić 46'; Kr. Horváth (yellow card) 49'; Fenyő (yellow card) 66'	Stadium: ETO Park; Attendance: 6,755; Referee: Balázs Berke; Assistant referees: István Széchenyi, Péter Ország
Note: • Győri ETO: Megyeri — Vlădoiu (Ba. Bíró (substituted on) 86'), Csinger, Miangué, Štefulj — R. Tóth, Vitális (c) — Bánáti (Huszár (substituted on) 79'), Gavrić (Boldor (substituted on) 86'), Bumba (Pyshchur (substituted on) 86') — Benbouali (Njie (substituted on) 36') • Manager: Borbély (yellow card) 62' • Player of the match: Milán Vitális, Győri ETO 7.5 • Best player of Újpest: Fran Brodić 7.4

7 March 2026 25	Zalaegerszeg	2–1	Győri ETO	Zalaegerszeg
17:00 CET	João Victor 3'; Maxsuell 83'; B. Kiss (yellow card) 90'; Amato (yellow card) 90+3'	Report	Gavrić 45+4'; R. Tóth (yellow card) 79'	Stadium: ZTE Arena; Attendance: 5,021; Referee: Ferenc Karakó; Assistant referees: Balázs Szert, Péter Ország
Note: • Győri ETO: Megyeri — Vlădoiu, Csinger (c), Krpić, Štefulj — Gavrić (Huszár (substituted on) 85'), R. Tóth, Décsy (Boldor (substituted on) 67') — Bánáti (Pyshchur (substituted on) 67'), Schön (Miangué (substituted on) 85') — Njie (Živković (substituted on) 85') • Manager: Borbély • Player of the match: Željko Gavrić, Győri ETO 7.8 • Best player of Zalaegerszeg: Maxsuell Alegria 7.5

13 March 2026 26	Győri ETO	0–0	MTK	Győr
20:00 CET		Report		Stadium: ETO Park; Attendance: 4,950; Referee: Gergő Bogár; Assistant referees: Balázs Szalai, Péter Garai
Note: • Győri ETO: Petráš — Vlădoiu (Njie (substituted on) 63'), Csinger, Krpić, Štefulj — Décsy (Ba. Bíró (substituted on) 63'), Vitális (c), Gavrić — Schön (Živković (substituted on) 83'), Benbouali (Pyshchur (substituted on) 75'), Bánáti (Bumba (substituted on) 46') • Manager: Borbély • Player of the match: Márk Csinger, Győri ETO 8.5 • Best player of MTK: Ilia Beriashvili 7.6

22 March 2026 27	Kazincbarcika	1–3	Győri ETO	Mezőkövesd
16:45 CET	Klausz 11'; Meskhi (yellow card) 40'	Report	R. Tóth (yellow card) 31'; Vitális 38', 79'; Schön (yellow card) 54'; Ba. Bíró 65'; Miangué (yellow card) 90'	Stadium: Városi Stadion; Attendance: 483; Referee: Mihály Káprály; Assistant referees: Balázs Buzás, István Albert
Note: • Győri ETO: Petráš — R. Tóth (Boldor (substituted on) 89'), Csinger, Krpić, Štefulj — Njie (Miangué (substituted on) 86'), Vitális (c) — Ba. Bíró, Bumba (Bánáti (substituted on) 86'), Schön (Gavrić (substituted on) 57') — Benbouali (Pyshchur (substituted on) 89') • Manager: Borbély • Player of the match: Milán Vitális, Győri ETO 9.4 • Best player of Kazincbarcika: Milán Klausz 7.2

5 April 2026 28	Győri ETO	1–0	Nyíregyháza	Győr
19:30 CEST	Njie (yellow card) 14'; Benbouali 25' (pen.); Csinger (yellow card) 54'; Gavrić (yellow card) 79'; Pyshchur (yellow card) 90+3'	Report	M. Kovács (yellow card) 11'; B. Katona (yellow card) 37'	Stadium: ETO Park; Attendance: 5,764; Referee: Imre Kovács; Assistant referees: József Aradi, Viktor Nagy
Note: • Győri ETO: Petráš — Ba. Bíró (Vlădoiu (substituted on) 61'), Csinger, Krpić, Štefulj — R. Tóth, Vitális (c) — Njie (Boldor (substituted on) 81'), Gavrić (Bumba (substituted on) 81'), Schön (Pyshchur (substituted on) 61') — Benbouali • Manager: Borbély (yellow card) 90+3' • Player of the match: Samuel Petráš, Győri ETO 8.1 • Best player of Nyíregyháza: Dániel Kovács 7.5

10 April 2026 29	Puskás Akadémia	1–4	Győri ETO	Felcsút
17:45 CEST	Maceiras (yellow card) 71'; Magyar 90+2'	Report	Vitális 16'; Csinger 50'; Benbouali 67'; Njie 69'; R. Tóth (yellow card) 86'	Stadium: Pancho Aréna; Attendance: 2,685; Referee: Mihály Káprály; Assistant referees: Norbert Bornemissza, Péter Garai
Note: • Győri ETO: Petráš — Ba. Bíró (Vlădoiu (substituted on) 70'), Csinger, Krpić, Štefulj — R. Tóth — Njie (Pyshchur (substituted on) 79'), Vitális (c), Gavrić (Bumba (substituted on) 70'), Schön (Szép (substituted on) 87') — Benbouali (Bánáti (substituted on) 70') • Manager: Borbély • Player of the match: Ante Roguljić, Győri ETO 8.4 • Best player of Puskás Akadémia: Zsolt Magyar 7.4

19 April 2026 30	Győri ETO	1–0	Ferencváros	Győr
19:30 CEST	Bánáti 82'; Csinger (yellow card) 90+2'; Petráš (yellow card) 90+3'; Krpić (yellow card) 90+7'	Report	Abu Fani (yellow card) 43'; Osváth (yellow card) 60'; Gómez (yellow card) 88'; Joseph (yellow card) 90+2'; B. Nagy (yellow card) 90+3' (On the bench)	Stadium: ETO Park; Attendance: 8,360; Referee: Balázs Berke; Assistant referees: Vencel Tóth II, Balázs Buzás
Note: • Győri ETO: Petráš — Ba. Bíró (Vlădoiu (substituted on) 75'), Csinger, Krpić, Štefulj — R. Tóth (Miangué (substituted on) 90+5'), Vitális (c), Gavrić (Bumba (substituted on) 87') — Njie (Pyshchur (substituted on) 87'), Benbouali, Schön (Bánáti (substituted on) 75') • Manager: Borbély • Player of the match: Samuel Petráš, Győri ETO 9.1 • Best player of Ferencváros: Dénes Dibusz 7.8

26 April 2026 31	Debrecen	1–1	Győri ETO	Debrecen
19:30 CEST	Mejias (yellow card) 44'; Cibla 73'; Gordić (yellow card) 82'; Guerrero (yellow card) 87'	Report	Gavrić (yellow card) 35'; Vitális 39'; Vlădoiu (yellow card) 78'	Stadium: Nagyerdei Stadion; Attendance: 6,544; Referee: Ferenc Karakó; Assistant referees: Gergő Vígh-Tarsonyi, Balázs Szert
Note: • Győri ETO: Petráš — Ba. Bíró, Csinger, Krpić, Štefulj — R. Tóth (Miangué (substituted on) 83'), Vitális (c) — Schön (Vlădoiu (substituted on) 63'), Gavrić, Bumba (Bánáti (substituted on) 83') — Benbouali (Pyshchur (substituted on) 89') • Manager: Borbély • Player of the match: Milán Vitális, Győri ETO 7.8 • Best player of Debrecen: Flórián Cibla 7.6

2 May 2026 32	Győri ETO	4–0	Diósgyőr	Győr
19:15 CEST	Schön 33', 47'; Benbouali 44'; Farkas 66' (o.g.); Vitális (yellow card) 86'	Report	Esiti (yellow card) 40'; Bárdos (yellow card) 62'	Stadium: ETO Park; Attendance: 7,781; Referee: Marcell Derdák; Assistant referees: Balázs Szalai, Péter Ország
Note: • Győri ETO: Petráš — Vlădoiu (Décsy (substituted on) 82'), Csinger, Krpić, Štefulj — R. Tóth, Vitális (c) — Schön (Živković (substituted on) 82'), Bánáti (Ba. Bíró (substituted on) 58'), Bumba (Szép (substituted on) 69') — Benbouali (Pyshchur (substituted on) 69') • Manager: Borbély • Player of the match: Szabolcs Schön, Győri ETO 10.0 • Best player of Diósgyőr: Márk Tamás 6.7

16 May 2026 33	Kisvárda	0–1	Győri ETO	Kisvárda
17:15 CEST		Report		Stadium: Várkerti Stadion; Referee: Bence Csonka dr. Assistant referees: Balázs Szert, Dániel Szalai

Note: Based on the decision of the MLSZ Competition Committee, the right to choose the domestic place was changed in the 4th round and the 15th round of the Fizz League (Nemzeti Bajnokság I).
Note: Győri ETO FC, who advanced in the UEFA Conference League, applied to the MLSZ (Hungarian Football Federation) Competition Committee with a unilateral postponement request, which examined the contents of the request and agreed to postpone the Kolorcity KBSC–Győri ETO FC match to be held in the 5th round of the Fizz League (Nemzeti Bajnokság I).
Source: Győri ETO FC Schedule in MLSZ Adatbank

=== Magyar Kupa ===
Win Draw Loss Fixtures Postponed

13 September 2025 R64	Érd (NB III)	0–3	Győri ETO	Érd
15:00 CEST	Morvai (yellow card) 64'; Kárász (yellow card) 90'	Report	Schön 46'; Gavrić 55'; Benbouali 70'	Stadium: Ercsi úti Pálya; Attendance: 600; Referee: Gábor Iványi; Assistant referees: Péter Ország, Szabin Topálszki
Note: • Győri ETO: Brecska — Ba. Bíró, Abrahamsson, Csinger (Boldor (substituted on) 60'), Štefulj — Schön (Tollár (substituted on) 60'), Vingler — Vitális (Anton (substituted on) 80'), Gavrić (Huszár (substituted on) 72'), Bumba — Benbouali (Pyshchur (substituted on) 72') • Manager: Borbély

29 October 2025 R32	Győri ETO	9–0	Pilis (MB I)	Győr
18:00 CET	Abrahamsson 5' (yellow card) 41'; Njie 8', 37'; Pyshchur 24', 29'; Huszár 45+1' (pen.); Živković 49', 57'; Urblík (yellow card) 62'; Boldor 67' (yellow card) 84'; Tollár (yellow card) 74'	Report	Nemes (yellow card) 47'; M. Rácz (yellow card) 64'; Á. Tóth (yellow card) 65'	Stadium: ETO Park; Attendance: 2,153; Referee: Mihály Káprály; Assistant referees: Gábor Máyer, Milán Mohos
Note: • Győri ETO: Megyeri — Vlădoiu, Abrahamsson (Urblík (substituted on) 46'), Miangué (Boldor (substituted on) 60'), Ba. Bíró — Njie, Anton (Tollár (substituted on) 46'), Vingler (Vitális (substituted on) 60') — Huszár (Bánáti (substituted on) 78'), Pyshchur, Živković • Manager: Borbély

12 February 2026 R16	Győri ETO	2–0	Videoton (NB II)	Győr
18:00 CET	Boldor (yellow card) 35'; Benbouali 64'; Kende 90+1' (o.g.)	Report		Stadium: ETO Park; Attendance: 6,218; Referee: Ferenc Karakó; Assistant referees: Balázs Buzás, Bence Belicza
Note: • Győri ETO: Petráš — Ba. Bíró, Csinger, Boldor, Bánáti (Benbouali (substituted on) 60') — Vitális (c), Vingler (R. Tóth (substituted on) 42') — Njie (Pyshchur (substituted on) 86'), Bumba (Krpić (substituted on) 86'), Schön — Huszár (Štefulj (substituted on) 60') • Manager: Borbély

3 March 2026 QF	Győri ETO	3–1 (a.e.t.)	Kecskemét (NB II)	Győr
20:00 CET	Gavrić 68', 120'; Bánáti (yellow card) 94'; Csinger (yellow card) 105'; Pyshchur 115' (yellow card) 115'; Boldor (yellow card) 121'	Report	Bolyki 12'; Bocskay (yellow card) 55'; Derekas (yellow card) 62'; A. Szabó (yellow card) 76'; Debreceni (yellow card) 76'	Stadium: ETO Park; Attendance: 3,720; Referee: Mihály Káprály; Assistant referees: Gergely Becséri, Dávid Rózsa
Note: • Győri ETO: Petráš — Ba. Bíró (Vlădoiu (substituted on) 84'), Krpić, Boldor (Csinger (substituted on) 100'), Štefulj — R. Tóth (Miangué (substituted on) 100') — Huszár (Gavrić (substituted on) 46'), Vitális (c), Bumba (Pyshchur (substituted on) 54'), Schön — Njie (Bánáti (substituted on) 90+2') • Manager: Borbély

22 April 2026 SF	Ferencváros (NB I)	2–2 (a.e.t.) (3–2 p)	Győri ETO	Budapest
20:00 CEST	Kovačević 5' (yellow card) 15'; O'Dowda (yellow card) 29'; Levi 45+4'; Raemaekers (yellow card) 53'; Gruber (yellow card) 120'	Report	Pyshchur (yellow card) 18'; Csinger 40'; Bumba 45+1'; Vlădoiu (yellow card) 50'; R. Tóth (yellow card) 119'	Stadium: Groupama Aréna; Attendance: 12,122; Referee: Tamás Bognár; Assistant referees: Péter Kóbor, Georgiou Theodoros
	Penalties
	Abu Fani (penalty missed); Gruber (penalty scored); Raemaekers (penalty scored); Joseph (penalty missed); Corbu (penalty scored)		Vitális (penalty missed); Krpić (penalty scored); Štefulj (penalty scored); Benbouali (penalty missed); Gavrić (penalty missed)
Note: • Győri ETO: Megyeri — Vlădoiu (Huszár 97), Csinger (Krpić (substituted on) 46'), Miangué, Štefulj — R. Tóth, Vitális (c) — Bánáti (Njie (substituted on) 46' (substituted off) 84' (Ba. Bíró (substituted on) 84')), Bumba (Gavrić (substituted on) 77'), Schön — Pyshchur (Benbouali (substituted on) 60') • Manager: Borbély

=== UEFA Conference League ===
Győri ETO FC will participate in the competition as the 4th place in the previous Nemzeti Bajnokság I (domestic league) season.

==== Second qualifying round ====
The draw for the second qualifying round was held on 18 June 2025.

24 July 2025 First leg	Pyunik (Armenia)	2–1	Győri ETO	Yerevan, Armenia
18:00 (20:00 AMT (UTC+4))	Noubissi (yellow card) 8' (goal) 22' (pen.); Vakulenko (yellow card) 33'; Islamovic (yellow card) 57'; Kulikov 66'; Almeida (yellow card) 85'	Report	Miljković 78' (o.g.)	Stadium: Vazgen Sargsyan Republican Stadium; Attendance: 7,150; Referee: Jasmin Sabotic (Luxembourg); Assistant referees: Tom Hansen, Armin Kehonjic
Note: • Győri ETO: Petráš — R. Tóth, Abrahamsson, Krpić, Štefulj — Vitális, Anton (c), Ouro (Živković (substituted on) 67') — Bumba, Benbouali (Pyshchur (substituted on) 67'), Gavrić (Njie (substituted on) 85') • Manager: Balázs Borbély • Best player of the match: Marius Noubissi, Pyunik 8.3 • Best player of Győr: Milán Vitális 7.4

31 July 2025 Second leg	Győri ETO	3–1 (4–3 agg.)	(Armenia) Pyunik	Győr
19:00 CEST	Krpić (yellow card) 13'; Benbouali 16', 69'; R. Tóth (yellow card) 34'; Štefulj 90' (yellow card) 90+1'; Boldor (yellow card) 90+5'	Report	Islamović (yellow card) 75'; Ocansey 84'; Miljković (yellow card) 90+5'	Stadium: ETO Park; Attendance: 1,620; Referee: Mervan Bejtullahu (Kosovo); Assistant referees: Edmond Zeqiri, Fatmir Sekiraqa
Note: • Győri ETO: Petráš — R. Tóth, Abrahamsson, Krpić, Štefulj — Anton (c), Ouro (Vingler (substituted on) 82'), Gavrić (Boldor (substituted on) 90+3') — Njie (Živković (substituted on) 74'), Bumba — Benbouali (Pyshchur (substituted on) 90+3') • Manager: Balázs Borbély • Best player of the match: Ahmed Nadhir Benbouali, Győr 10.0

Győr won 4–3 on aggregate.

==== Third qualifying round ====
7 August 2025 First leg	AIK (Sweden)	2–1	Győri ETO	Stockholm, Sweden
19:00 CEST	Beširović 7'; Celina 21'; Papagiannopoulos (yellow card) 73'	Report	Vitális 79'	Stadium: Strawberry Arena; Attendance: 17,842; Referee: Daniel Schlager (Germany); Assistant referees: Sven Waschitzki, Robert Wessel
Note: • Győri ETO: Petráš — Krpić, Abrahamsson (Boldor (substituted on) 86'), Csinger — R. Tóth, Gavrić, Anton (c), Ouro (Pyshchur (substituted on) 90+2'), Bánáti (Vlădoiu (substituted on) 46') — Benbouali, Bumba (Vitális (substituted on) 61') • Manager: Borbély • Player of the match: Bersant Celina, AIK 8.1 • Best player of Győr: Milán Vitális 8.0

14 August 2025 Second leg	Győri ETO	2–0 (3–2 agg.)	(Sweden) AIK	Győr
19:00 CEST	Vitális (yellow card) 21'; Gavrić 34'; Anton (yellow card) 45+1'; Csinger (yellow card) 50'; Benbouali (yellow card) 54'; Csongvai 60' (o.g.)	Report	Beširović (yellow card) 40'; Thychosen (yellow card) 43'; Salétros (penalty missed) 51'	Stadium: ETO Park; Attendance: 6,991; Referee: Lawrence Visser (Belgium); Assistant referees: Ruben Wyns, Michele Seeldraeyers
Note: • Győri ETO: Petráš — Vlădoiu, Krpić, Csinger, Štefulj — Vitális, Anton (R. Tóth (substituted on) 80'), Ouro (Boldor (substituted on) 86') — Gavrić (Bánáti (substituted on) 80'), Benbouali, Bumba (Pyshchur (substituted on) 90+4') • Manager: Borbély • Player of the match: Samuel Petráš, Győr 9.9 • Best player of AIK: Benjamin Hansen 7.6

Győri ETO won 3–2 on aggregate.

==== Play-off round ====
21 August 2025 First leg	Győri ETO	2–1	(Austria) Rapid Wien	Győr
19:00 CEST	Gavrić 45+1', 82'	Report	Wurmbrand 61'; Dahl (yellow card) 76'; Seidl (yellow card) 90+5'	Stadium: ETO Park; Attendance: 8,055; Referee: Igor Stojchevski (North Macedonia); Assistant referees: Vjolca Izeiri, Filip Ickovski
Note: • Győri ETO: Petráš — Vlădoiu, Csinger, Krpić (Abrahamsson (substituted on) 56'), Štefulj — Vitális, Ouro (R. Tóth (substituted on) 81'), Anton (c) — Gavrić (Huszár (substituted on) 89'), Benbouali, Bumba (Pyshchur (substituted on) 89') • Manager: Borbély • Player of the match: Željko Gavrić, Győri ETO 9.2 • Best player of Rapid Wien: Nikolaus Wurmbrand 7.3

28 August 2025 Second leg	Rapid Wien (Austria)	2–0 (3–2 agg.)	Győri ETO	Vienna, Austria
19:00 CEST	Mbuyi 7', 81'; Radulović (yellow card) 86'; Dahl (yellow card) 90+2'	Report	Ouro (yellow card) 35'; Sahli (yellow card) 41' (On bench); Abrahamsson (yellow card) 48'	Stadium: Allianz Stadion; Attendance: 22,250; Referee: Manfredas Lukjančukas (Lithuania); Assistant referees: Mangirdas Mirauskas, Aleksandras Stepanovas
Note: • Győri ETO: Petráš — Abrahamsson (Urblík (substituted on) 65'), Csinger, Štefulj — Vlădoiu (R. Tóth (substituted on) 46'), Anton (c), Vitális, Bumba — Gavrić (Huszár (substituted on) 82'), Ouro (Pyshchur (substituted on) 82') — Benbouali • Manager: Borbély (yellow card) 82' • Player of the match: Claudy Mbuyi, Rapid Wien 9.5 • Best player of Győri ETO: Samuel Petráš 8.2

Rapid Wien won 3–2 in aggregate.

== See also ==
- List of Győri ETO FC seasons
- Győri ETO FC in European football
