= Márk Csinger =

Hungarian footballer (born 2003)

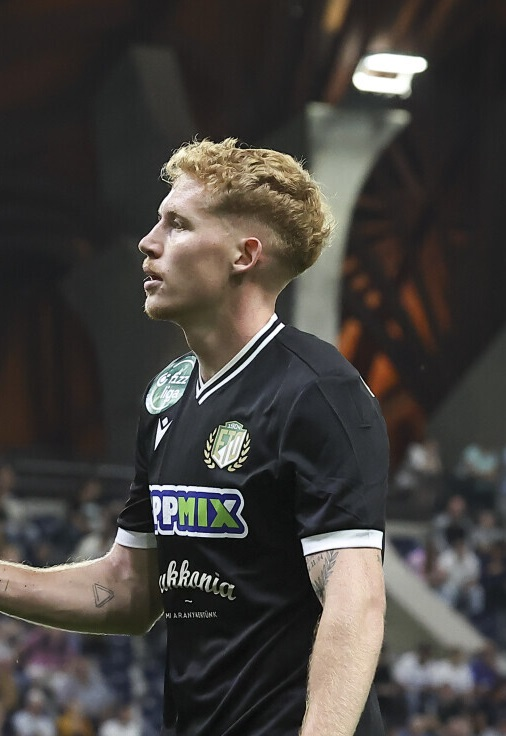
- Csinger playing for Győr in 2025

Personal information
- Date of birth: 31 May 2003 (age 23)
- Place of birth: Jászberény, Hungary
- Height: 1.85 m (6 ft 1 in)
- Position: Defender

Team information
- Current team: Groningen
- Number: 4

Youth career
- 2009–2011: Jászboldogháza
- 2011–2012: Zagyvarékas
- 2012–2016: Szolnok
- 2016–2019: MTK Budapest
- 2019–2022: SPAL

Senior career*
Years	Team	Apps	(Gls)
2022–2026	DAC Dunajská Streda	34	(1)
2022–2023	→ Győr (loan)	12	(1)
2025–2026	→ Győr (loan)	31	(2)
2026	Győr	0	(0)
2026–	Groningen	6	(0)

International career^{‡}
2017	Hungary U15	2	(0)
2018–2019	Hungary U16	6	(1)
2019	Hungary U17	6	(0)
2021–2022	Hungary U19	7	(0)
2022–2024	Hungary U21	10	(0)
2026–	Hungary	7	(1)
- * Club domestic league appearances and goals as of 23:09, 18 September 2026 (UTC) ‡ National team caps and goals as of 00:30, 18 November 2026 (UTC)

Márk Csinger (born 31 May 2003) is a Hungarian professional footballer who plays as a defender for Eredivisie club Groningen and the Hungary national team.

== Club career ==
Csinger began his youth career in Jászboldogháza, later progressing through Zagyvarékas and Szolnok before joining MTK in 2016, and he advanced through Hungary's youth national teams while attracting interest from Napoli and SPAL, ultimately signing with the latter. At SPAL, he made 40 appearances in the Primavera, Italy's top reserve championship, before leaving the club in the summer to join DAC Dunajská Streda. Following his move to DAC, he was subsequently loaned to Nemzeti Bajnokság II club Győr on 8 July 2022.

=== Győr ===
On 2 August 2025, he returned to Győr, now competing in the Nemzeti Bajnokság I, on a one-year loan from DAC Dunajská Streda, with Samsondin Ouro moving in the opposite direction.

=== Groningen ===
On 14 August 2026, he was signed by Eredivisie club FC Groningen. He debuted in a 4–1 victory against ADO Den Haag in the 2026–27 Eredivisie season on 16 August 2026.

== International career ==
Csinger was called up to the Hungary national team for a set of friendlies in June 2026. He scored his first goal in a 2–1 victory over Ukraine in the 2026–27 UEFA Nations League B match at the Anton Malatinský Stadium, Trnava, Slovakia.

== Career statistics ==
=== Club ===
As of match played 14 July 2026

Appearances and goals by club, season and competition
Club	Season	League			National cup (Note: Includes Magyar Kupa, Slovak Cup)		Europe		Other		Total	
Club	Season	Division	Apps	Goals	Apps	Goals	Apps	Goals	Apps	Goals	Apps	Goals
Győr (loan)	2022–23	Nemzeti Bajnokság II	12	1	3	1	—		—		15	2
DAC Dunajská Streda	2023–24	Slovak First Football League	24	1	2	0	—		—		26	1
DAC Dunajská Streda	2024–25	Slovak First Football League	10	0	2	0	1 (Note: Appearance(s) in UEFA Conference League)	0	1 (Note: Appearance in European play-offs)	0	14	0
DAC Dunajská Streda	Total		34	1	4	0	1	0	1	0	40	1
Győr (loan)	2025–26	Nemzeti Bajnokság I	31	2	4	1	4	0	—		39	3
Győr	2026–27	Nemzeti Bajnokság I	0	0	—		2 (Note: Appearances in UEFA Champions League)	0	—		2	0
Győr	Total		31	2	4	1	6	0	—		41	3
Career total			77	4	11	2	7	0	1	0	96	6

=== International ===
As of match played 17 November 2026

Appearances and goals by national team and year
National team	Year	Apps	Goals
Hungary	2026	7	1
Total		7	1

Scores and results list Hungary's goal tally first, score column indicates score after each Csinger goal.

List of international goals scored by Márk Csinger
No.	Date	Venue	Cap	Opponent	Score	Result	Competition
1	5 October 2026	Anton Malatinský Stadium, Trnava, Slovakia	5	Ukraine	2–1	2–1	2026–27 UEFA Nations League B

== Honours ==
Győr

- Nemzeti Bajnokság I: 2025–26
