= Senna Miangué =

Belgian footballer

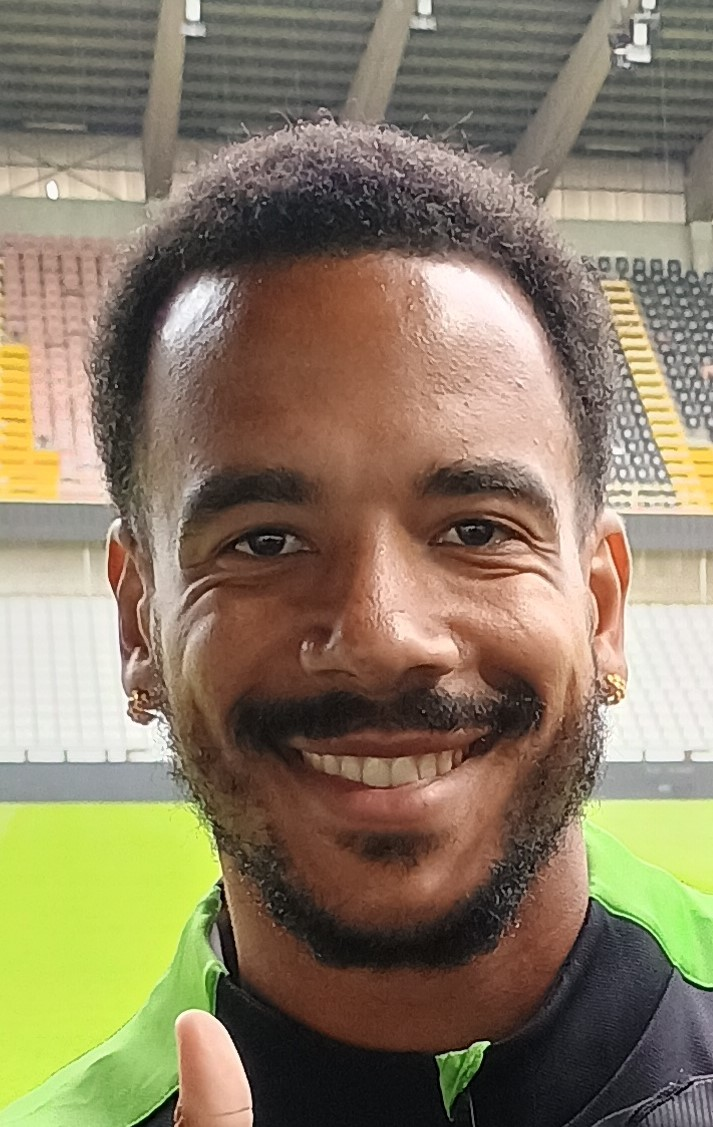
- Miangué with Cercle Brugge in 2024.

Personal information
- Full name: Senna Malik Miangué
- Date of birth: 5 February 1997 (age 29)
- Place of birth: Antwerp, Belgium
- Height: 1.97 m (6 ft 6 in)
- Position: Left back

Team information
- Current team: Aktobe
- Number: 13

Youth career
- Beerschot
- 2013–2015: Inter Milan

Senior career*
Years	Team	Apps	(Gls)
2015–2017	Inter Milan	3	(0)
2017	→ Cagliari (loan)	4	(0)
2017–2022	Cagliari	11	(0)
2018–2020	→ Standard Liège (loan)	10	(0)
2020–2021	→ Eupen (loan)	24	(0)
2021–2022	→ Cercle Brugge (loan)	19	(3)
2022–2025	Cercle Brugge	48	(0)
2025–2026	Győri ETO	9	(0)
2026–	Aktobe	9	(0)

International career^{‡}
2012	Belgium U15	4	(0)
2012–2013	Belgium U16	10	(0)
2014–2015	Belgium U18	5	(0)
2014–2016	Belgium U19	11	(0)
2016–2019	Belgium U21	11	(0)
- * Club domestic league appearances and goals as of 1 November 2026 ‡ National team caps and goals as of 20:31, 5 June 2019 (UTC)

Senna Malik Miangué (born 5 February 1997) is a Belgian professional footballer who plays as a defender in Kazakhstan Premier League club FC Aktobe. Having previously played in the academies of Beerschot and Royal Antwerp in his native Belgium, Miangué moved to Italy in 2013 to join Serie A side Internazionale.

== Club career ==
=== Inter Milan ===
He appeared on the bench for Inter for the first time on 10 April 2016. He made his Serie A debut for the club on 28 August 2016, coming off the bench for Davide Santon in a 1–1 draw with Palermo. Two days later, he was rewarded with a new four-year deal with the club. He made his UEFA Europa League debut for Inter on 29 September in a 3–1 loss to Sparta Prague. Miangué made a total of four appearances for the club before signing for Cagliari, initially on loan, and then permanently.

=== Cagliari ===
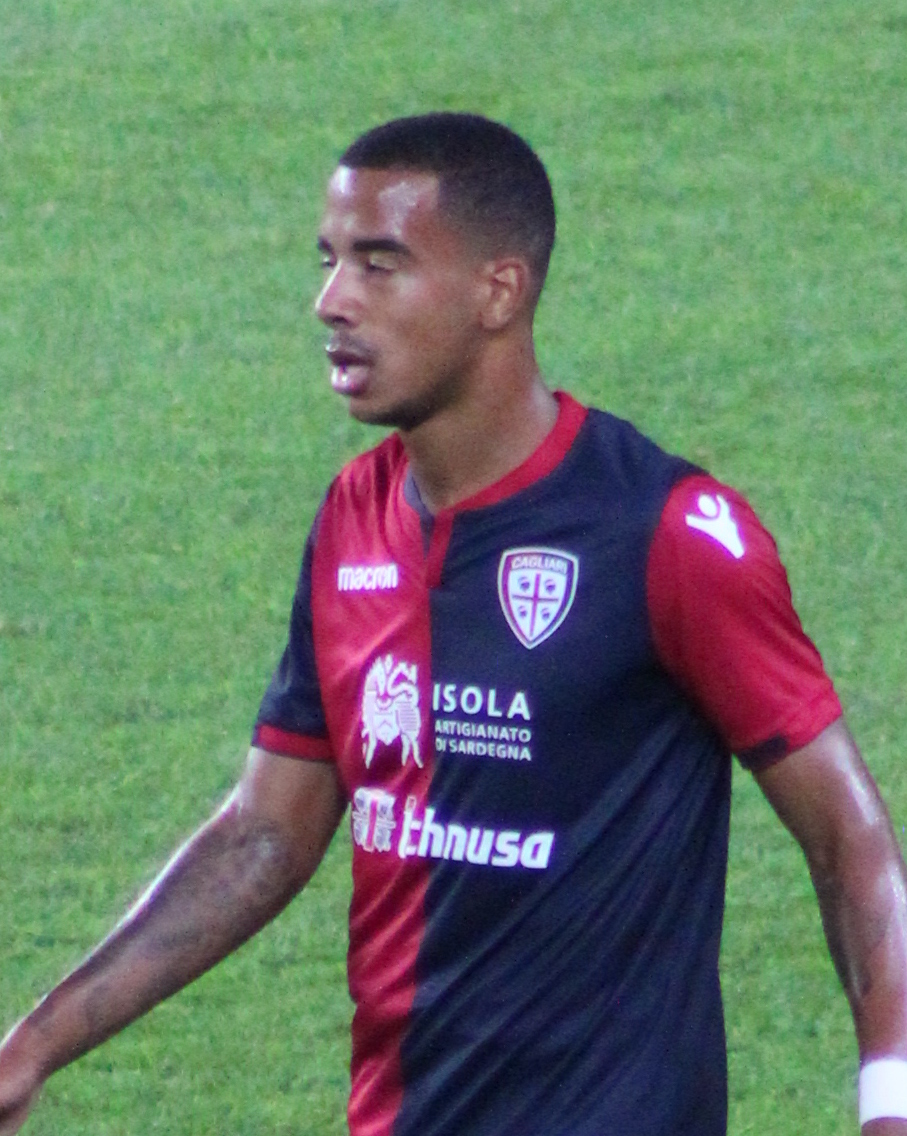
Miangué with Cagliari in 2017.

On 26 January 2017, fellow Serie A side Cagliari announced Miangué's signing on loan for the remainder of the season, with the club retaining the option of purchase at the end thereof. He made his debut for the club on 29 January and assisted Marco Borriello for a 92nd-minute equalizer in a 1–1 draw with Bologna. He made two further appearances, as Cagliari ended the season in 11th position. On 30 June, he signed for the club permanently.

The following season, on 30 December, he received his first ever red card, when he was sent off in a league win over Atalanta.

==== Standard Liège (loan) ====
On 28 June 2018, Miangué returned to his native Belgium to join Standard Liège on a two-year loan deal. Miangue failed to win a place in the starting lineup for the club, losing out in the competition to Nicolas Gavory and financially troubled Standard eventually declined the option to take him over for three million euros.

==== Eupen (loan) ====
On 7 July 2020, Miangué joined Eupen on loan until 30 June 2021. He made his debut for the club in a 2–1 home win over Gent on 11 September, playing the full game at left-back. Miangué ended the season with 24 appearances, before returning to Cagliari as his loan spell ended.

=== Cercle Brugge ===
On 15 June 2021, it was announced that Miangué had joined Cercle Brugge on loan until 30 June 2022, with Cercle also having negotiated an option to buy in the deal. He made his debut as a starter on 24 July 2021 in a match against Beerschot which was interrupted after 55 minutes due to heavy rainfall. At that point, Miangué had been substituted due to a hamstring injury in the 36th minute for Boris Popovic.

On 23 June 2022, Cercle Brugge agreed on a permanent transfer with Cagliari and Miangué signed a three-year contract with the club.

=== Győri ETO ===
On 3 October 2025, Miangué joined Nemzeti Bajnokság I club Győri ETO FC until 30 June 2026.

== International career ==
After having represented Belgium at various youth levels (starting in 2012 with the under-15 until 2019 with the under-21), Miangué switched nationality in March 2020, by accepting the call from Congo in the view of the double match against Eswatini for the 2021 Africa Cup of Nations qualification Group I.

== Career statistics ==
=== Club ===
As of 1 August 2021.

Appearances and goals by club, season and competition
Club	Season	League			Cup^{1}		Continental^{2}		Total	
Club	Season	Division	Apps	Goals	Apps	Goals	Apps	Goals	Apps	Goals
Inter Milan	2016–17	Serie A	3	0	0	0	2	0	5	0
Inter Milan	Total		3	0	0	0	2	0	5	0
Cagliari	2016–17	Serie A	4	0	0	0	0	0	4	0
Cagliari	2017–18	Serie A	11	0	1	0	0	0	12	0
Cagliari	Total		15	0	1	0	0	0	16	0
Standard Liège	2018–19	Belgian Pro League	6	0	0	0	0	0	6	0
Standard Liège	2019–20	Belgian Pro League	3	0	1	0	0	0	4	0
Standard Liège	Total		9	0	1	0	0	0	10	0
Eupen	2020–21	Belgian Pro League	24	0	0	0	—		24	0
Cercle Brugge	2021–22	Belgian Pro League	1	0	0	0	—		1	0
Győri ETO	2025–26	Nemzeti Bajnokság I	0	0	0	0	—		0	0
Career total			27	0	2	0	2	0	31	0

^{1} Includes Coppa Italia matches.
^{2} Includes UEFA Europa League matches.

== Personal life ==
Miangué was born in Antwerp, Belgium, to a Congolese Malagasy father, Boniface, who was also a footballer, and a Belgian Flemish mother, Anneke. His younger brother Che Malik was part of The Voice van Vlaanderen on VTM and played football for Royal Antwerp F.C., his sister Morane is a singer and a former contestant on The Voice van Vlaanderen. He is named after former Brazilian Formula 1 World Champion, Ayrton Senna. He is also fluent in four languages.

== Honours ==
Győr

- Nemzeti Bajnokság I: 2025–26
