= Szabolcs Schön =

Hungarian footballer (born 2000)

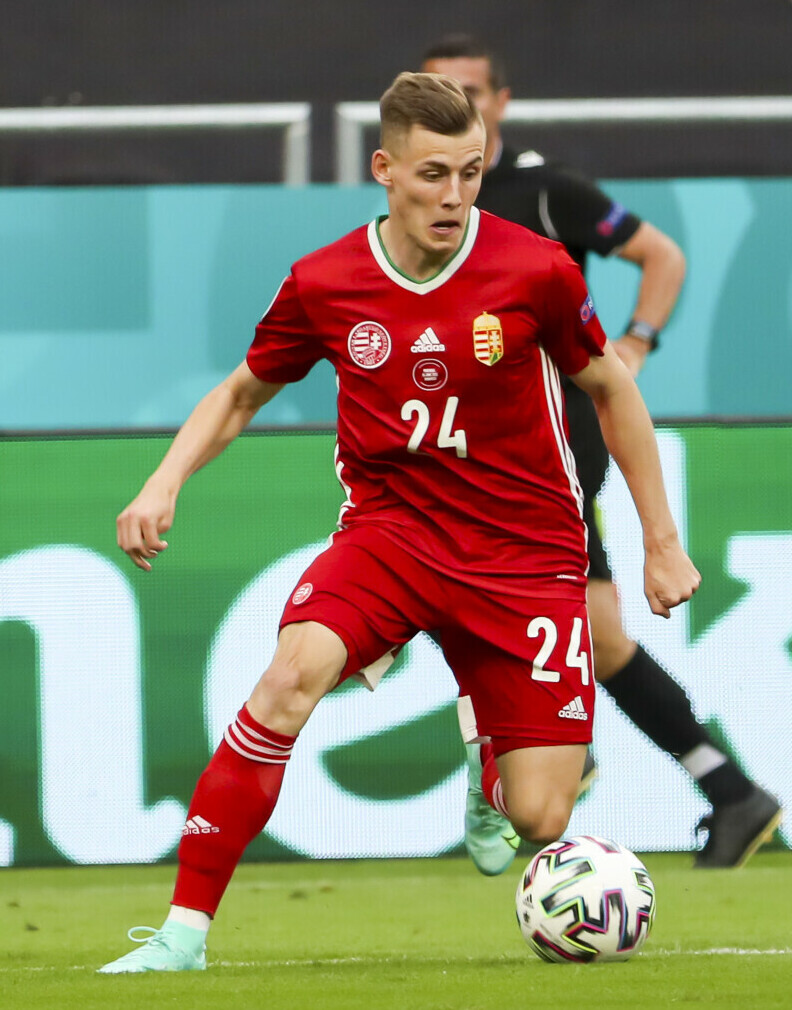
- Schön playing for Hungary in 2021

Personal information
- Full name: Szabolcs Gergő Schön
- Date of birth: 27 September 2000 (age 26)
- Place of birth: Budapest, Hungary
- Height: 1.70 m (5 ft 7 in)
- Positions: Left winger; left wing-back

Team information
- Current team: Győr
- Number: 17

Youth career
- 2009–2017: Budapest Honvéd
- 2017–2019: Ajax

Senior career*
Years	Team	Apps	(Gls)
2018–2019	Jong Ajax	1	(0)
2019–2021	MTK Budapest	49	(13)
2021–2022	FC Dallas	24	(0)
2022–2024	Fehérvár	53	(4)
2024–2026	Bolton Wanderers	39	(1)
2025–2026	→ Győr (loan)	24	(4)
2026–	Győr	0	(0)

International career^{‡}
2015–2016	Hungary U16	11	(1)
2016–2017	Hungary U17	18	(2)
2018	Hungary U18	2	(0)
2017–2019	Hungary U19	16	(4)
2019–2022	Hungary U21	6	(0)
2021–	Hungary	11	(1)
- * Club domestic league appearances and goals as of 07:56, 27 May 2026 (UTC) ‡ National team caps and goals as of 31 March 2026

Szabolcs Gergő Schön (born 27 September 2000) is a Hungarian professional footballer who plays as a left winger or left wing-back for Nemzeti Bajnokság I club Győr and the Hungary national team.

== Club career ==
In April 2021, Schön signed with FC Dallas. He returned to Hungary on 26 August 2022, signing with Fehérvár.

=== Bolton Wanderers ===
On 2 August 2024 he signed a three-year deal with EFL League One club Bolton Wanderers for an undisclosed fee.

On 5 October 2024, Schön scored his first goal for Bolton when netting the equaliser against Shrewsbury Town in a 2–2 draw at the Toughsheet Community Stadium.

==== Győri ETO FC (loan) ====
On 1 September 2025, Bolton confirmed that Schön had joined Hungarian side Győr on a season long loan. Szabolcs Schön returned to the NB I last September after Bolton Wanderers—a team that had seen better days and was then playing in England's third division—loaned him to ETO FC Győr for the season. It took him a few months to settle in, but as soon as he became a regular starter and Balázs Borbély relied on him exclusively as a left winger (he had previously played left back and right winger on several occasions), he regained his national team form.

=== Győri ETO FC ===
On 26 May 2026, ETO FC Győr announced on their official website that they had exercised the purchase option included in the contract of Szabolcs Schön—who has been playing on loan with the team since last September—and had permanently acquired the 25-year-old player from Bolton Wanderers.

== International career ==
On 1 June 2021, Schön was included in the final 26-man squad to represent Hungary at the rescheduled UEFA Euro 2020 tournament. He took part in two of three group stage matches for Hungary at Euro 2020 where Hungary nearly pulled off the impossible in escaping the group of death with France, Germany, and Portugal.

He made his debut for Hungary national team on 8 June 2021 in a friendly against Ireland. He substituted Ádám Szalai in the 88th minute of a 0–0 draw.

In March 2026, after a long pause, he was called up for the national team against Slovenia and Greece.

On 28 March 2026, he scored his first goal in the national team in a 1–0 victory over Slovenia in a friendly match at Puskás Aréna.

== Career statistics ==
=== Club ===
As of 22 March 2026

Appearances and goals by club, season and competition
Club	Season	League			National Cup		League Cup		Other		Total	
Club	Season	Division	Apps	Goals	Apps	Goals	Apps	Goals	Apps	Goals	Apps	Goals
Jong Ajax	2018–19	Eerste Divisie	1	0	—		—		0	0	1	0
MTK Budapest	2018–19	Nemzeti Bajnokság I	5	0	0	0	—		0	0	5	0
MTK Budapest	2019–20	Nemzeti Bajnokság II	17	4	7	1	—		0	0	24	5
MTK Budapest	2020–21	Nemzeti Bajnokság I	27	9	6	2	—		0	0	33	11
MTK Budapest	Total		49	13	13	3	0	0	0	0	62	16
FC Dallas	2021	MLS	24	0	0	0	—		0	0	24	0
FC Dallas	2022	MLS	0	0	2	0	—		0	0	2	0
FC Dallas	Total		24	0	2	0	0	0	0	0	26	0
Fehérvár	2022–23	Nemzeti Bajnokság I	21	4	1	0	—		0	0	22	4
Fehérvár	2023–24	Nemzeti Bajnokság I	31	0	0	0	—		0	0	31	0
Fehérvár	2024–25	Nemzeti Bajnokság I	1	0	—		—		2 (Note: Appearances in UEFA Europa Conference League)	0	3	0
Fehérvár	Total		53	4	1	0	0	0	2	0	58	4
Bolton Wanderers	2024–25	EFL League One	39	1	1	0	1	0	3 (Note: Appearances in EFL Trophy)	0	44	1
Győr (loan)	2025–26	Nemzeti Bajnokság I	21	4	3	1	—		—		24	5
Career total			187	22	20	4	1	0	5	0	213	26

=== International ===
As of match played 31 March 2026

Appearances and goals by national team and year
National team	Year	Apps	Goals
Hungary	2021	8	0
Hungary	2022	1	0
Hungary	2026	2	1
Total		11	1

Scores and results list Hungary's goal tally first, score column indicates score after each Schön goal.

List of international goals scored by Szabolcs Schön
No.	Date	Venue	Opponent	Score	Result	Competition
1	28 March 2026	Puskás Aréna, Budapest, Hungary	Slovenia	1–0	1–0	Friendly

== Honours ==
MTK

- Nemzeti Bajnokság II: 2019–20

Győr

- Nemzeti Bajnokság I: 2025–26
