= Barnabás Bíró =

Hungarian footballer (born 2005)

- Bíró with Győr in 2026 winning Nemzeti Bajnokság I

Personal information
- Date of birth: 6 January 2005 (age 21)
- Height: 1.78 m (5 ft 10 in)
- Position: Right-back

Team information
- Current team: Győr
- Number: 20

Youth career
- 2010–2016: Halászi
- 2016–2024: Győr

Senior career*
Years	Team	Apps	(Gls)
2023–	Győr II	39	(1)
2024–	Győr	28	(1)

International career^{‡}
2025–	Hungary U21	3	(0)
- * Club domestic league appearances and goals as of 25 October 2026 ‡ National team caps and goals as of 31 March 2026

Barnabás Bíró (born 6 January 2005) is a Hungarian professional footballer who plays as a right-back for Nemzeti Bajnokság I club Győr and the Hungary U21 national team.

== Career ==
A product of the Győr youth system, Bíró made his Nemzeti Bajnokság I debut as a late substitute in a 3–0 away win over Puskás Akadémia on 7 December 2024. He signed a professional contract with the club during the 2024–25 winter transfer period.

== Career statistics ==
As of match played 25 October 2026

Appearances and goals by club, season and competition
Club	Season	League			Magyar Kupa		Europe		Total	
Club	Season	Division	Apps	Goals	Apps	Goals	Apps	Goals	Apps	Goals
Győr II	2023–24	Nemzeti Bajnokság III	13	0	—		—		13	0
Győr II	2024–25	Nemzeti Bajnokság III	20	1	—		—		20	1
Győr II	2025–26	Nemzeti Bajnokság III	5	0	—		—		5	0
Győr II	2026–27	Nemzeti Bajnokság III	1	0	—		—		1	0
Győr II	Total		39	1	—		—		39	1
Győr	2024–25	Nemzeti Bajnokság I	8	0	0	0	—		8	0
Győr	2025–26	Nemzeti Bajnokság I	16	1	5	0	—		21	1
Győr	2026–27	Nemzeti Bajnokság I	4	0	0	0	3 (Note: One appearance in UEFA Champions League, two appearances in UEFA Conference League)	0	7	0
Győr	Total		28	1	5	0	3	0	36	1
Career total			67	2	5	0	3	0	75	2

== Honours ==
Győr

- Nemzeti Bajnokság I: 2025–26
