= Milán Vitális =

Hungarian footballer (born 2002)

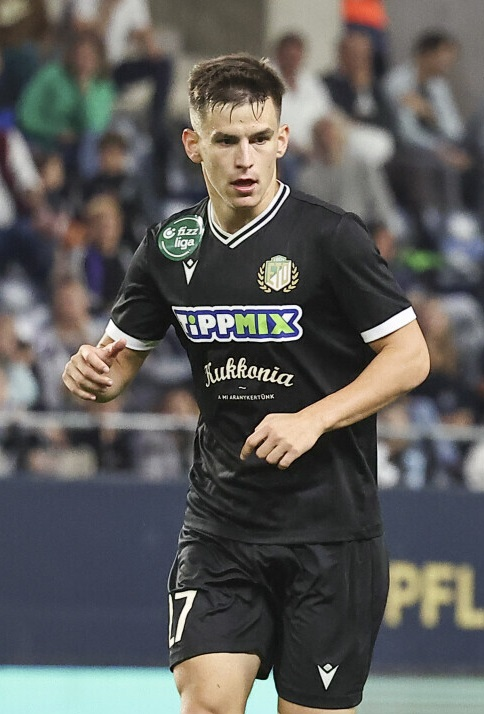
- Vitális playing for Győr in 2025

Personal information
- Date of birth: 28 January 2002 (age 24)
- Place of birth: Nyíregyháza, Hungary
- Height: 1.79 m (5 ft 10 in)
- Position: Midfielder

Team information
- Current team: AEK Athens
- Number: 27

Youth career
- 2008–2009: Dávid SC
- 2009–2012: Nyíregyházi Sportcentrum
- 2012–2014: Győr
- 2014–2015: Debrecen
- 2015–2021: Győr

Senior career*
Years	Team	Apps	(Gls)
2018–2022	Győr	74	(5)
2022–2023	Dunajská Streda	39	(5)
2022–2023	→ Győr (loan)	36	(2)
2023–2024	→ Šamorín (loan)	5	(0)
2025	→ Győr (loan)	13	(1)
2025–2026	Győr	31	(9)
2026–	AEK Athens	4	(0)

International career^{‡}
2016–2017	Hungary U15	3	(0)
2017	Hungary U17	1	(0)
2022–2024	Hungary U21	15	(2)
2025–	Hungary	13	(0)
- * Club domestic league appearances and goals as of 20 September 2026 ‡ National team caps and goals as of 14 November 2026

Milán Vitális (born 28 January 2002) is a Hungarian professional footballer who plays as a midfielder for Greek Super League club AEK Athens and the Hungary national team.

== Club career ==
Vitális started his sports career in his hometown, Nyíregyháza. He moved to western Hungary at the age of 10, and since then his career has mostly taken place in and around Győr.

=== Győr ===
He became a professional player in Győri ETO, and played his first professional match on May 19, 2019 against the Mosonmagyaróvár in the Nemzeti Bajnokság II. Since 2022, he has been a player of DAC, which is close to Győr but is in Slovakia, but has played in Győr several times, most recently since 2025, on loan.

=== AEK Athens ===
On 6 August 2026, Vitális signed a four-year contract with Greek club AEK Athens. He was signed for 2 and half million euros, according to Nemzeti Sport. On 17 September 2026, he scored his first goal in a 8-1 victory over Panserraikos F.C. in the 2026–27 Greek Football Cup season.

== International career ==
On May 20, 2025, Vitális received his first invitation to the Hungarian national team from coach Marco Rossi.

== Career statistics ==
=== Club ===
As of match played 16 May 2026

Appearances and goals by club, season and competition
Club	Season	League			Cup		Europe		Other		Total	
Club	Season	Division	Apps	Goals	Apps	Goals	Apps	Goals	Apps	Goals	Apps	Goals
Győr	2018–19	Nemzeti Bajnokság II	1	0	0	0	—		—		1	0
Győr	2019–20	Nemzeti Bajnokság II	2	0	0	0	—		—		2	0
Győr	2020–21	Nemzeti Bajnokság II	24	1	1	0	—		—		25	1
Győr	2021–22	Nemzeti Bajnokság II	37	4	4	0	—		—		41	4
Győr	Total		74	5	5	0	—		—		79	5
Győr (loan)	2022–23	Nemzeti Bajnokság II	36	2	3	0	—		—		39	2
Dunajská Streda	2023–24	Slovak First Football League	23	3	5	0	2 (Note: Appearances in UEFA Conference League)	0	—		30	3
Dunajská Streda	2024–25	Slovak First Football League	16	2	4	1	2	0	—		22	3
Dunajská Streda	Total		39	5	9	1	4	0	—		52	6
Šamorín (loan)	2023–24	2. Liga	5	0	—		—		—		5	0
Győr (loan)	2024–25	Nemzeti Bajnokság I	13	1	1	1	—		—		14	2
Győr	2025–26	Nemzeti Bajnokság I	31	9	5	0	5	1	—		41	10
Career total			188	22	23	2	9	1	0	0	221	25

=== International ===
As of match played 14 November 2026

Appearances and goals by national team and year
National team	Year	Apps	Goals
Hungary	2025	4	0
Hungary	2026	9	0
Total		13	0

== Honours ==
Győr

- Nemzeti Bajnokság I: 2025–26

Individual

- Nemzeti Bajnokság I Goal of the Month: July–August 2025
