= László Vingler =

Hungarian footballer (born 2005)

- Vingler with Győr in 2026 winning Nemzeti Bajnokság I

Personal information
- Date of birth: 31 October 2005 (age 20)
- Place of birth: Győr, Hungary
- Height: 1.80 m (5 ft 11 in)
- Position: Midfielder

Team information
- Current team: Győr
- Number: 8

Youth career
- 2010–2015: Győrújfalu
- 2015–2022: Győr

Senior career*
Years	Team	Apps	(Gls)
2022–	Győr II	29	(0)
2022–	Győr	70	(2)
2024–2025	→ Szentlőrinc (loan)	18	(1)

International career^{‡}
2023–2024	Hungary U19	7	(1)
2025–	Hungary U21	5	(0)
- * Club domestic league appearances and goals as of 14 January 2026 ‡ National team caps and goals as of 14 January 2026

László Vingler (born 31 October 2005) is a Hungarian professional footballer who plays as a midfielder for Nemzeti Bajnokság I club Győr.

== Career ==
A product of the Győr's youth academy, he joined the club in 2015 from his hometown side Győrújfalu, and steadily progressed through every youth level of the club. Vingler made his senior debut in 2022, appearing for ETO Akadémia in the Nemzeti Bajnokság III against Puskás Akadémia II, before featuring both in the Magyar Kupa and the league for the senior team. His technical skills and tactical maturity quickly earned him opportunities under head coach Antonio Muñoz, and in the opening round of the 2023–24 season he marked his growing importance with a goal in the local derby against Gyirmót. On 12 December 2023, he extended his contract with Győr until 30 June 2026, affirming his commitment to continue his development at his boyhood club.

On 19 October 2024, Vingler was announced as the first player to benefit from a new cooperation agreement between Győr and Szentlőrinc, under which he joined the Nemzeti Bajnokság II side to gain first-team experience during the 2024–25 season.

== Career statistics ==
As of match played 14 January 2026

Appearances and goals by club, season and competition
Club	Season	League			Magyar Kupa		Europe		Total	
Club	Season	Division	Apps	Goals	Apps	Goals	Apps	Goals	Apps	Goals
Győr II	2021–22	Nemzeti Bajnokság III	1	0	—		—		1	0
Győr II	2022–23	Nemzeti Bajnokság III	20	0	—		—		20	0
Győr II	2023–24	Nemzeti Bajnokság III	2	0	—		—		2	0
Győr II	2024–25	Nemzeti Bajnokság III	3	0	—		—		3	0
Győr II	2025–26	Nemzeti Bajnokság III	3	0	—		—		3	0
Győr II	Total		29	0	—		—		29	0
Győr	2022–23	Nemzeti Bajnokság II	11	0	2	0	—		13	0
Győr	2023–24	Nemzeti Bajnokság II	28	1	1	0	—		29	1
Győr	2024–25	Nemzeti Bajnokság I	18	1	1	0	—		19	1
Győr	2025–26	Nemzeti Bajnokság I	13	0	2	0	1 (Note: Appearance in UEFA Conference League)	0	16	0
Győr	Total		70	2	6	0	1	0	77	2
Szentlőrinc (loan)	2024–25	Nemzeti Bajnokság II	18	1	—		—		18	1
Career total			117	3	6	0	1	0	124	3

== Honours ==
Győr

- Nemzeti Bajnokság I: 2025–26
