= Paul Anton =

Romanian footballer

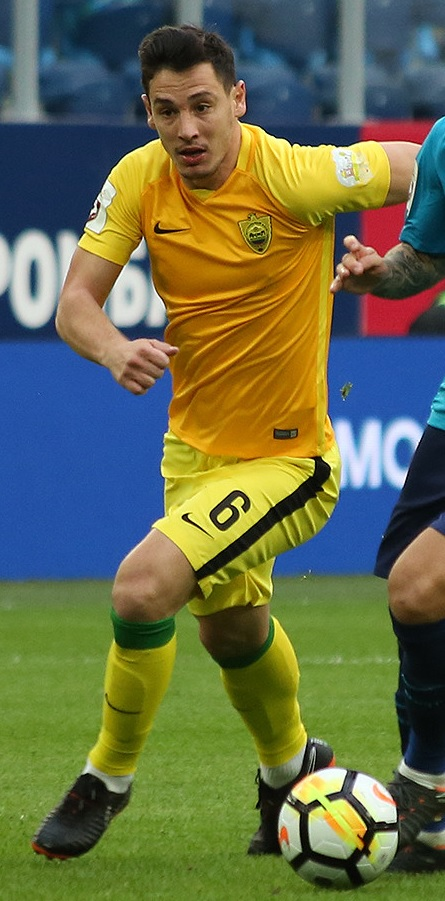
- Anton with Anzhi Makhachkala in 2018

Personal information
- Full name: Paul Viorel Anton
- Date of birth: 10 May 1991 (age 35)
- Place of birth: Bistrița, Romania
- Height: 1.82 m (6 ft 0 in)
- Position: Midfielder

Team information
- Current team: Győr
- Number: 5

Youth career
- 2001–2008: Gloria Bistrița

Senior career*
Years	Team	Apps	(Gls)
2008–2012	Gloria Bistrița	59	(3)
2008–2009	→ Delta Tulcea (loan)	27	(4)
2010	→ FCM Târgu Mureș (loan)	14	(0)
2013–2015	Pandurii Târgu Jiu	74	(6)
2015–2017	Dinamo București	43	(8)
2016–2017	→ Getafe (loan)	30	(2)
2018	Anzhi Makhachkala	11	(3)
2018–2020	Krylia Sovetov Samara	40	(4)
2020–2021	Dinamo București	31	(5)
2021–2022	Ponferradina	29	(0)
2022–2023	UTA Arad	27	(0)
2023–	Győr	67	(5)

International career
2011–2012	Romania U21	6	(0)
2014–2019	Romania	13	(0)
- * Club domestic league appearances and goals as of 13 December 2025

Paul Viorel Anton (Romanian pronunciation: [ˈpaul vi.oˈrel anˈton]; born 10 May 1991) is a Romanian professional footballer who plays as a defensive midfielder for Nemzeti Bajnokság I club Győr, which he captains.

== Club career ==
=== Early years ===
In 2008, Anton began his career with his hometown club Gloria Bistrița, being promoted from the juniors. In the same year, he was loaned to Delta Tulcea, where he played a season and scored 4 goals in 27 Liga II matches. However, after the loan to Delta Tulcea, Anton was sent to the Gloria Bistrița's reserves, where he played a season, after being loaned to FCM Târgu Mureș, and in 2010 he returned to the first team. In his first Liga I campaign with Bistrița, he appeared in 18 matches and scored one goal. The club relegated in 2011 and promoted back in first division a year after.

=== Pandurii Târgu Jiu ===
On 7 January 2013, Anton signed a deal with Pandurii Târgu Jiu. In the 2012–13 season, he played 13 matches and scored three times in the Liga I for Pandurii, including two goals against CS Turnu Severin, helping his team in the 3–1 win. Coming as runner-ups in the league, the club earned a place in the UEFA Europa League and Anton was used as a starter in all the 10 matches played in that competition.

=== Dinamo București ===
On 7 September 2015, Anton signed a contract with Dinamo București. Three days later, he made his debut in a 2–0 Cupa Ligii victory over his former team Pandurii Târgu Jiu. Anton scored his first goal for "the Red Dogs" in a league match with FC Voluntari on 30 November.

Anton agreed to a season-long loan deal with Spanish club Getafe on 28 July 2016. He made 32 appearances and scored two goals all competitions comprised as El Geta achieved promotion to the La Liga.

=== Anzhi Makhachkala ===
On 29 December 2017, Russian team Anzhi Makhachkala signed Anton on a two-and-a-half-year contract. Two weeks before the official announcement, Romanian press reported the transfer fee at €500,000.

Anton made his debut for Anzhi on 2 March 2018, starting in a 1–1 league draw to Rubin Kazan. His first goals for the club came on 17 March, when he netted both in a 2–0 win over FC Tosno.

=== Krylia Sovetov Samara ===
On 21 August 2018, Anton signed a three-year contract with PFC Krylia Sovetov Samara. He left Krylia Sovetov on 10 August 2020, following club's relegation from the Russian Premier League.

=== Ponferradina ===
On 28 August 2021, after one year back at Dinamo București, Anton signed for SD Ponferradina in the Spanish Segunda División. On 4 September of the following year, he agreed to terminate his contract with the club.

=== UTA Arad ===
On 5 September 2022, he came back to Romania signing a contract with UTA Arad

== International career ==
Anton made his full debut for Romania on 24 March 2018, replacing Mihai Pintilii in the 72nd minute in a 2–1 friendly win against Israel.

== Career statistics ==
=== Club ===
As of 13 December 2025

Appearances and goals by club, season and competition
Club	Season	League			National cup (Note: Includes Cupa României, Russian Cup, Copa del Rey, Magyar Kupa)		Europe		Other		Total	
Club	Season	Division	Apps	Goals	Apps	Goals	Apps	Goals	Apps	Goals	Apps	Goals
Delta Tulcea (loan)	2008–09	Liga II	27	4	0	0	—		—		27	4
Gloria Bistrița	2009–10	Liga I	1	0	0	0	—		—		1	0
Gloria Bistrița	2010–11	Liga I	20	0	2	0	—		—		22	0
Gloria Bistrița	2011–12	Liga II	20	2	0	0	—		—		20	2
Gloria Bistrița	2012–13	Liga I	18	1	0	0	—		—		18	1
Gloria Bistrița	Total		59	3	2	0	0	0	0	0	61	3
FCM Târgu Mureș (loan)	2009–10	Liga II	14	0	—		—		—		14	0
Pandurii Târgu Jiu	2012–13	Liga I	13	3	—		—		—		13	3
Pandurii Târgu Jiu	2013–14	Liga I	29	2	1	0	10 (Note: Appearances in UEFA Europa League)	0	—		40	2
Pandurii Târgu Jiu	2014–15	Liga I	28	1	2	0	—		5	0	35	1
Pandurii Târgu Jiu	2015–16	Liga I	4	0	—		—		—		4	0
Pandurii Târgu Jiu	Total		74	6	3	0	10	0	5	0	92	6
Dinamo București	2015–16	Liga I	23	2	4	0	—		4	0	31	2
Dinamo București	2016–17	Liga I	1	0	0	0	—		—		1	0
Dinamo București	2017–18	Liga I	19	6	1	0	2	0	—		22	6
Dinamo București	Total		43	8	5	0	2	0	4	0	54	8
Getafe (loan)	2016–17	Segunda División	30	2	0	0	—		2	0	32	2
Anzhi Makhachkala	2017–18	Russian Premier League	9	2	—		—		2 (Note: Appearances in relegation play-offs)	0	11	2
Anzhi Makhachkala	2018–19	Russian Premier League	2	1	0	0	—		—		2	1
Anzhi Makhachkala	Total		11	3	0	0	0	0	2	0	13	3
Krylia Sovetov Samara	2018–19	Russian Premier League	23	2	2	1	—		2	0	27	3
Krylia Sovetov Samara	2019–20	Russian Premier League	17	2	1	0	—		—		18	2
Krylia Sovetov Samara	Total		40	4	3	1	0	0	2	0	45	5
Dinamo București	2020–21	Liga I	30	5	5	2	—		—		35	7
Dinamo București	2021–22	Liga I	1	0	0	0	—		—		1	0
Dinamo București	Total		31	5	5	2	—		—		36	7
Ponferradina	2021–22	Segunda División	28	0	3	0	—		—		31	0
Ponferradina	2022–23	Segunda División	1	0	—		—		—		1	0
Ponferradina	Total		29	0	3	0	0	0	0	0	32	0
UTA Arad	2022–23	Liga I	27	0	5	1	—		2 (Note: Appearances in Liga I promotion/relegation play-offs)	0	34	1
Győr	2023–24	Nemzeti Bajnokság II	29	2	1	0	—		—		30	2
Győr	2024–25	Nemzeti Bajnokság I	24	1	3	0	—		—		27	1
Győr	2025–26	Nemzeti Bajnokság I	14	2	2	0	6 (Note: Appearances in UEFA Conference League)	0	—		22	2
Győr	2026–27	Nemzeti Bajnokság I	0	0	0	0	0	0	—		0	0
Győr	Total		67	5	6	0	6	0	—		79	5
Career total			452	40	32	4	18	0	17	0	519	44

=== International ===
As of 15 October 2019.

Appearances and goals by national team and year
National team	Year	Apps	Goals
Romania
Romania	2015	2	0
Romania	2016	0	0
Romania	2017	0	0
Romania	2018	8	0
Romania	2019	3	0
Total		13	0

== Honours ==
FCM Târgu Mureș

- Liga II: 2009–10

Pandurii Târgu Jiu

- Cupa Ligii runner-up: 2014–15

Dinamo București

- Cupa României runner-up: 2015–16

Győr

- Nemzeti Bajnokság I: 2025–26
