= Oleksandr Pyshchur (footballer, born 2005) =

Ukrainian footballer

- Pyshchur with Győr in 2026 winning Nemzeti Bajnokság I

Personal information
- Full name: Oleksandr Oleksandrovych Pyshchur
- Date of birth: 24 January 2005 (age 21)
- Place of birth: Chernihiv, Ukraine
- Height: 2.04 m (6 ft 8 in)
- Position: Forward

Team information
- Current team: Girona
- Number: 15

Youth career
- 2019: SDYuShOR Desna
- 2020: Desna-3 Chernihiv

Senior career*
Years	Team	Apps	(Gls)
2021–2022	Munkach Mukachevo	7	(1)
2022–2023	Puskás Akadémia II	21	(13)
2023–2024	Kisvárda U19	0	(0)
2024–2025	Gyirmót	26	(7)
2025–2026	Győr	25	(2)
2026–	Girona	11	(1)

International career^{‡}
2023	Ukraine U19	1	(0)
2025	Ukraine U20	5	(1)
2025–	Ukraine U21	8	(2)
- * Club domestic league appearances and goals as of 15 November 2026 ‡ National team caps and goals as of 15 November 2026

Oleksandr Oleksandrovych Pyshchur (Ukrainian: Олександр Олександрович Пищур; born 24 January 2005) is a Ukrainian professional footballer who plays as a forward for Segunda División club Girona.

== Club career ==
=== Early career ===
Oleksandr Pyshchur, born in Chernihiv, where he started his career with SDYuShOR Desna, Desna-3 Chernihiv, then in summer 2020 he moved to Munkach Mukachevo where he played in the Ukrainian Second League. On 1 October 2021 he scored against Rubikon Kyiv giving the victory for his team. On 30 October 2021 he played against his hometown club Chernihiv at the Chernihiv Arena.

=== Puskás Akadémia FC ===
In January 2022 he moved to the Hungarian club Puskás Akadémia II playing in Nemzeti Bajnokság III for the season 2021–22 season. The following season he played 21 games and scored 13 goals.

=== Gyirmót ===
In summer 2024 he moved to Gyirmót. On 28 September 2024, he scored the first goal in Nemzeti Bajnokság II against Soroksár. On 31 October 2024 he scored two goals in Magyar Kupa against ESMTK.

=== Győr ===
On 23 June 2025 he signed for Győr just promoted in Nemzeti Bajnokság I. On 3 August 2025 he scored his first goal in Nemzeti Bajnokság I against Újpest at the ETO Park. On 13 September 2025, he made his debut with his new club in Magyar Kupa against Érd, replacing Nadhir Benbouali. On 16 May 2026, with the club he won the Nemzeti Bajnokság I.

=== Girona ===
On 12 June 2026 he signed for Girona in Segunda División.

== International career ==
In September 2025 he was called up by the Ukraine under-20 team for the 2025 FIFA U-20 World Cup in September-October 2025. On 27 September 2025, he scored against South Korea at the Estadio Elías Figueroa Brander in Valparaíso.

== Personal life ==
His father Oleksandr Pyshchur was also a professional football player.

== Career statistics ==
=== Club ===
As of match played 15 November 2026

Appearances and goals by club, season and competition
Club	Season	League			Cup		Europe		Other		Total	
Club	Season	Division	Apps	Goals	Apps	Goals	Apps	Goals	Apps	Goals	Apps	Goals
Munkach Mukachevo	2021–22	Ukrainian Second League	7	1	1	0	0	0	0	0	8	1
Puskás Akadémia II	2021–22	Nemzeti Bajnokság III	0	0	0	0	0	0	0	0	0	0
Puskás Akadémia II	2022–23	Nemzeti Bajnokság III	21	13	0	0	0	0	0	0	21	13
Gyirmót	2024–25	Nemzeti Bajnokság II	26	7	3	2	0	0	0	0	29	9
ETO FC Győr	2025–26	Nemzeti Bajnokság I	25	2	5	3	6 (Note: six appearances in 2025–26 UEFA Europa Conference League Second qualifying round)	0	0	0	36	5
Girona	2026–27	Segunda División	11	1	1	1	—		—		12	2
Career total			90	24	10	6	6	0	0	0	106	30

== Honours ==
Győri ETO FC

- Nemzeti Bajnokság I: 2025–26
