= Alexander Abrahamsson =

Swedish footballer (born 1999)

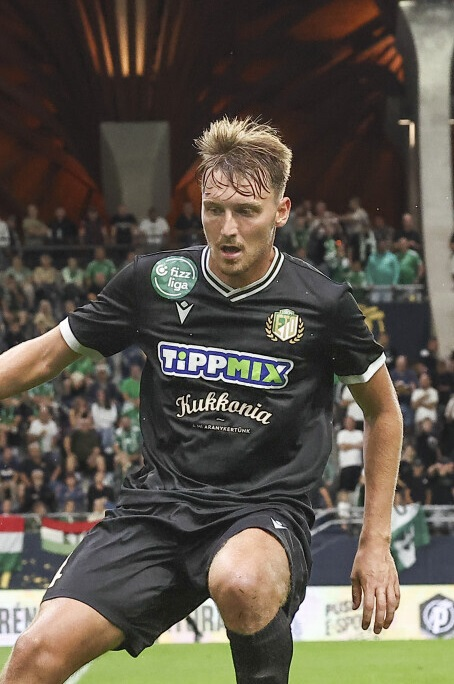
- Abrahamsson playing for Győr in 2025

Personal information
- Full name: Nils Oscar Alexander Abrahamsson
- Date of birth: 7 August 1999 (age 27)
- Height: 1.89 m (6 ft 2 in)
- Position: Defender

Team information
- Current team: Győri ETO
- Number: 4

Youth career
- Unik FK
- Sunnersta AIF
- 2015–2018: Djurgårdens IF

Senior career*
Years	Team	Apps	(Gls)
2019–2020	Djurgårdens IF	0	(0)
2021	Akropolis IF	21	(1)
2022–2024	IF Brommapojkarna	58	(0)
2025	Zagłębie Lubin	2	(0)
2025	Zagłębie Lubin II	9	(0)
2025–	Győri ETO	10	(0)

International career
2016	Sweden U17	2	(0)
2019	Sweden U20	1	(0)
- * Club domestic league appearances and goals as of 19 January 2026

Nils Oscar Alexander Abrahamsson (born 7 August 1999) is a Swedish professional footballer who plays as a defender for Hungarian Nemzeti Bajnokság I club Győri ETO.

Abrahamsson hails from Uppsala and started his youth career in Unik FK before moving on to another local team Sunnersta AIF. In 2015 he joined the academy of Djurgårdens IF. He made his youth international debut for Sweden in September 2016.

Abrahamsson was moved up to Djurgården's senior team ahead of the 2019 season. He made his debut for Djurgården in February 2019, in a 2018–19 Svenska Cupen match against Hässleholms IF. Some media speculated that Abrahamsson would be the replacement for Marcus Danielson in central defence, but it did not come to fruition. Instead, in February 2020 Abrahamsson had to undergo surgery on his meniscus. In June 2020 he was injured again, this time suffering a torn muscle.

He was released after the 2020 season, went to Superettan and signed for Akropolis IF. After one year, he transferred to another Stockholm club IF Brommapojkarna. For BP he made his Allsvenskan debut on 1 April 2023 against his former club Djurgården.

On 20 January 2025, Abrahamsson moved on a free transfer to Polish club Zagłębie Lubin on a two-and-a-half-year deal. On 20 June 2025, he and Zagłębie agreed to part ways.

Two days later, Abrahamsson joined Hungarian side Győri ETO.

== Honours ==
Győr

- Nemzeti Bajnokság I: 2025–26
