= Győri ETO FC in European football =

Győri ETO FC is a professional football club based in Győr, Hungary.

== Matches ==
Season	Competition	Round	Country	Club	Home	Away	Aggregate
1964–65	European Cup	Preliminary Round	(East Germany)	Chemie Leipzig	4–2	2–0	6–2
		1st Round	(Bulgaria)	PFC Lokomotiv Sofia	5–3	3–4	8–7
		Quarter-finals	(Netherlands)	DWS	1–0	1–1	2–1
		Semi-finals	(Portugal)	S.L. Benfica	0–1	0–4	0–5
1966–67	UEFA Cup Winners' Cup	1st Round	(Italy)	ACF Fiorentina	4–2	0–1	4–3
		2nd Round	(Portugal)	SC Braga	3–0	0–2	3–2
		Quarter-finals	(Belgium)	Standard Liége	2–1	0–2	2–3
1967–68	UEFA Cup Winners' Cup	1st Round	(Cyprus)	Apollon Limassol	5–0	4–0	9–0
		2nd Round	(Italy)	AC Milan	2–2	1–1	3–3 (a)
1968–69	UEFA Cup Winners' Cup	1st Round	(Romania)	Dinamo București	x	x	w/o
1969–70	Inter-Cities Fairs Cup	1st Round	(Switzerland)	Lausanne Sports	2–1	2–1	4–2
		2nd Round	(Spain)	FC Barcelona	2–3	0–2	2–5
1974–75	UEFA Cup	1st Round	(Bulgaria)	PFC Lokomotiv Plovdiv	3–1	1–3	4–4 (a)
		2nd Round	(West Germany)	Fortuna Düsseldorf	2–0	0–3	2–3
1979–80	UEFA Cup Winners' Cup	1st Round	(Italy)	Juventus FC	2–1	0–2	2–3
1982–83	European Cup	1st Round	(Belgium)	Standard Liège	3–0	0–5	3–5
1983–84	European Cup	1st Round	(Iceland)	Vikingur KF	2–1	2–0	4–1
		2nd Round	(Soviet Union)	Dinamo Minsk	3–6	1–3	4–9
1984–85	UEFA Cup	1st Round	(England)	Manchester United	2–2	0–3	2–5
1985–86	UEFA Cup	1st Round	(Czechoslovakia)	FC Bohemians Praha	3–1	1–4	4–5 (aet)
1986–87	UEFA Cup	1st Round	(Soviet Union)	Dinamo Minsk	0–1	4–2	4–3
		2nd Round	(Italy)	Torino FC	1–1	0–4	1–5
1989	UEFA Intertoto Cup	Group 4	(Switzerland)	Grasshopper FC	1–0	1–2	
		Group 4	(Austria)	VfB Admira Wacker	5–0	1–5	
		Group 4	(Denmark)	Brøndby IF	1–0	1–1	
2003	UEFA Intertoto Cup	1st Round	(Cyprus)	Ethnikos Achna FC	1–1	2–2	3–3 (a)
		2nd Round	(Spain)	Racing Santander	2–1	0–1	2–2 (a)
2008–09	UEFA Cup	1st Qualifying Round	(Georgia (country))	FC Zestaponi	1–1	2–1	3–2
		2nd Qualifying Round	(Germany)	VfB Stuttgart	1–4	1–2	2–6
2010–11	UEFA Europa League	1st Qualifying Round	(Slovakia)	Nitra	3–1	2–2	5–3
		2nd Qualifying Round	(Kazakhstan)	Atyrau	2–0	3–0	5–0
		3rd Qualifying Round	(France)	Montpellier	0–1	1–0	1–1 (p)
		Play-off Round	(Croatia)	Dinamo Zagreb	0–2	1–2	1–4
2013–14	UEFA Champions League	2nd Qualifying Round	(Israel)	Maccabi Tel Aviv F.C.	0–2	1–2	1–4
2014–15	UEFA Europa League	2nd Qualifying Round	(Sweden)	IFK Göteborg	0–3	1–0	1–3
2025–26	UEFA Conference League	2nd Qualifying Round	(Armenia)	Pyunik	3–1	1–2	4–3
2025–26	UEFA Conference League	3rd Qualifying Round	(Sweden)	AIK	2–0	1–2	3–2
2025–26	UEFA Conference League	Play-off Round	(Austria)	Rapid Wien	2–1	0–2	2–3
2026–27	UEFA Champions League	1st Qualifying Round	(Iceland)	Víkingur Reykjavík	2–2	0–1	2–3
2026–27	UEFA Conference League	2nd Qualifying Round	(Luxembourg)	Atert Bissen	1–1	6–2	7–3
2026–27	UEFA Conference League	3rd Qualifying Round	(Latvia)	Riga	1–1	0–1	1–2

== Record by country of opposition ==
- Correct as of 13 August 2026.

Country	Pld	W	D	L	GF	GA	GD	Win%
Armenia	2	1	0	1	4	3	+1	50.00
Austria	4	2	0	2	8	8	+0	50.00
Belgium	4	2	0	2	5	8	−3	50.00
Bulgaria	4	2	0	2	12	11	+1	50.00
Croatia	2	0	0	2	1	4	−3	0.00
Czechoslovakia	2	1	0	1	4	5	−1	50.00
Cyprus	4	2	2	0	12	3	+9	50.00
Denmark	2	1	1	0	2	1	+1	50.00
East Germany	2	2	0	0	6	2	+4	100.00
England	2	0	1	1	2	5	−3	0.00
France	2	1	0	1	1	1	+0	50.00
(Georgia (country)) Georgia	2	1	1	0	2	1	+1	50.00
Germany	2	0	0	2	2	6	−4	0.00
Greece	8	4	2	2	14	14	+0	50.00
Iceland	5	2	1	2	6	5	+1	40.00
Israel	2	0	0	2	0	2	−2	0.00
Italy	8	2	3	3	10	14	−4	25.00
Kazakhstan	2	2	0	0	5	0	+5	100.00
Latvia	2	0	1	1	1	2	−1	0.00
Luxembourg	2	1	1	0	7	3	+4	50.00
the Netherlands	2	1	1	0	2	1	+1	50.00
Poland	2	0	0	2	1	3	−2	0.00
Portugal	4	1	0	3	3	7	−4	25.00
Slovakia	2	1	1	0	5	3	+2	50.00
Soviet Union	4	1	0	3	8	12	−4	25.00
Spain	4	1	0	3	4	7	−3	25.00
Sweden	4	2	0	2	4	5	−1	50.00
Switzerland	4	3	0	1	6	4	+2	75.00
West Germany	2	1	0	1	2	3	−1	50.00
Totals	91	37	15	39	139	143	-4	40.66

P – Played; W – Won; D – Drawn; L – Lost; GF – Goals for; GA – Goals against; GD – Goal difference;

== Records ==
As of 30 April 2018

- Biggest win: 17/08/2010, Győr 10-0 Encamp, Gyor
- Biggest defeat: 11/10/2017, Barcelona 7-0 Győr, Padova
- Appearances in UEFA Futsal Cup: 7
- Player with most UEFA appearances: 36 Ákos Harnisch
- Top scorers in UEFA club competitions: 20 Zoltán Dróth
