= Rajmund Tóth =

Hungarian footballer (born 2004)

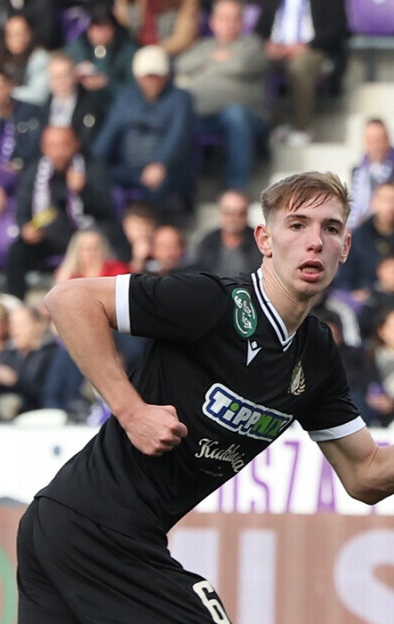
- Tóth playing for Győr in 2025

Personal information
- Date of birth: 9 April 2004 (age 22)
- Place of birth: Győr, Hungary
- Height: 1.82 m (6 ft 0 in)
- Position: Midfielder

Team information
- Current team: Konyaspor
- Number: 66

Youth career
- 2011–2015: Győrújfalu
- 2015–2023: Győri ETO

Senior career*
Years	Team	Apps	(Gls)
2022–2023	ETO Academy	42	(1)
2022–2026	Győri ETO	79	(2)
2026–	Konyaspor	10	(1)

International career^{‡}
2022–2023	Hungary U19	3	(0)
2024	Hungary U20	1	(0)
2024–	Hungary U21	6	(0)
2026–	Hungary	6	(1)
- * Club domestic league appearances and goals as of 8 November 2026 ‡ National team caps and goals as of 18 November 2026

Rajmund Tóth (born 9 April 2004) is a Hungarian professional footballer who plays as a midfielder for Süper Lig club Konyaspor and the Hungary national team.

== Club career ==
=== Győr ===
Tóth made his first Nemzeti Bajnokság I appearance on 26 July 2024 against Nyíregyháza Spartacus for his youth club Győri ETO. He won the 2025–26 Nemzeti Bajnokság I with Győr.

=== Konyaspor ===
On 17 August 2026, he was signed by Süper Lig club Konyaspor. He debuted in a 4-2 defeat from Fenerbahçe S.K. at the Şükrü Saracoğlu Stadium, Istanbul, in the 2026–27 Süper Lig season.

== International career ==
Tóth debuted for the Hungary U19 on 19 November 2022 against Italy in a friendly match.

He made his first appearance for the Hungary U21 on 14 November 2024, against Cyprus in a friendly.

On 9 June 2026, he debuted in the national team in a friendly tie against Kazakhstan at the Nagyerdei Stadion in Debrecen. The match ended with a 3-1 victory for Hungary and Tóth scored the third Hungarian goal.

== Career statistics ==
=== Club ===
As of match played 16 May 2026

Club	Season	League			Magyar Kupa		Europe		Other		Total	
Club	Season	Division	Apps	Goals	Apps	Goals	Apps	Goals	Apps	Goals	Apps	Goals
ETO Academy	2021–22	Nemzeti Bajnokság III	19	0	—		—		—		19	0
ETO Academy	2022–23	Nemzeti Bajnokság III	20	1	—		—		—		20	1
ETO Academy	2023–24	Nemzeti Bajnokság III	1	0	—		—		—		1	0
ETO Academy	2025–26	Nemzeti Bajnokság III	2	0	—		—		—		2	0
ETO Academy	Total		42	1	—		—		—		42	1
Győri ETO	2022–23	Nemzeti Bajnokság II	1	0	—		—		—		1	0
Győri ETO	2023–24	Nemzeti Bajnokság II	23	2	2	0	—		—		25	2
Győri ETO	2024–25	Nemzeti Bajnokság I	25	0	1	0	—		—		26	0
Győri ETO	2025–26	Nemzeti Bajnokság I	30	0	3	0	6 (Note: Appearances in the UEFA Conference League)	0	—		39	0
Győri ETO	Total		79	2	6	0	6	0	—		91	2
Career total			121	3	6	0	6	0	—		133	3

=== International ===
As of match played 17 November 2026

Appearances and goals by national team and year
National team	Year	Apps	Goals
Hungary	2026	6	1
Total		6	1

Scores and results list Hungary's goal tally first, score column indicates score after each Tóth goal.

List of international goals scored by Rajmund Tóth
No.	Date	Venue	Opponent	Score	Result	Competition
1	9 June 2026	Nagyerdei Stadion, Debrecen, Hungary	Kazakhstan	3–1	3–1	Friendly

== Honours ==
Győr

- Nemzeti Bajnokság I: 2025–26
