= Unik FK =

Swedish football club

- Full name: Unik Fotbollklubb
- Founded: 1947; 79 years ago
- Ground: Valsätra IP; Uppsala; Sweden
- Chairman: Martin Andersson
- Head coach: Ali Abdallah
- League: Division 3 Östra Svealand
- 2013: Division 3 Östra Svealand, 6th
Home colours	Away colours

Unik FK is a Swedish football club based in Uppsala. The bandy club and the football club Unik are now legally separate, but allied and share logo, colours, history and fan base.

== Background ==
Uppsala-Näs Idrottsklubb was founded at Södergård on a summer day in 1947 and served the area just south of Uppsala town. These days the catchment has moved a bit and is now within the city limits, the club being based at Valsätra IP and serves the Gottsunda, Valsätra and the Norby areas. The club is now known in its abbreviated form as Unik, with football section as Unik Fotbollklubb and the bandy section as Unik BK. Unik FK run men's senior and junior teams and is supported by a thriving youth section including a football school for 6–7 year old.

Since their foundation Unik FK has participated mainly in the middle and lower divisions of the Swedish football league system. The first team currently plays in Division 4 Uppland in the sixth tier of the Swedish football pyramid. They play their home matches at the Valsätra IP in Uppsala.

Unik FK are affiliated to Upplands Fotbollförbund.

== Recent history ==
In recent seasons Unik FK have competed in the following divisions:

2013 – Division III, Norra Svealand
2012 – Division III, Norra Svealand
2011 – Division III, Norra Svealand
2010 – Division IV, Uppland
2009 – Division V, Uppland Södra
2008 – Division VI, Uppland Västra
2007 – Division VI, Uppland Västra
2006 – Division VI, Uppland Södra
2005 – Division VI, Uppland Västra
2004 – Division VI, Uppland Västra
2003 – Division VI, Uppland Östra
2002 – Division V, Uppland Östra
2001 – Division V, Uppland Västra
2000 – Division V, Uppland Västra
1999 – Division V, Uppland Södra

== Attendances ==
In recent seasons Unik FK have had the following average attendances:

Season	Average attendance	Division / Section	Level
2009	Not available	Div 6 Uppland Västraa	Tier 8
2009	43	Div 5 Uppland Södra	Tier 7
2010	91	Div 4 Uppland	Tier 6
2011	119	Div 3 Norra Svealand	Tier 5
2012	96	Div 3 Norra Svealand	Tier 5
2013	118	Div 3 Östra Svealand	Tier 5

* Attendances are provided in the Publikliga sections of the Svenska Fotbollförbundet website.
