= Daniel Štefulj =

Croatian footballer (born 1999)

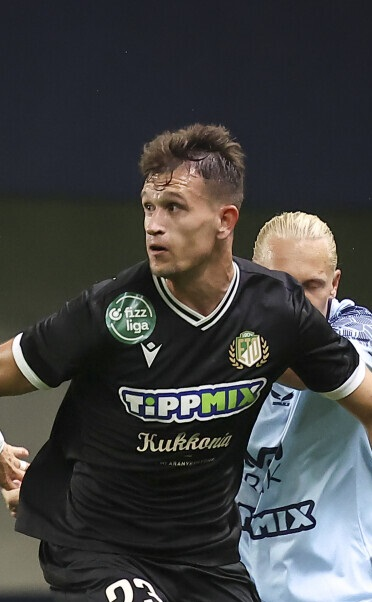
- Štefulj playing for Győr in 2025

Personal information
- Date of birth: 8 November 1999 (age 27)
- Place of birth: Langenhagen, Germany
- Height: 1.85 m (6 ft 1 in)
- Position: Left-back

Team information
- Current team: Győri ETO
- Number: 23

Youth career
- 2008–2010: Međimurje
- 2010–2015: Varaždin
- 2016–2018: NK Zagreb

Senior career*
Years	Team	Apps	(Gls)
2017–2018	NK Zagreb	8	(0)
2018–2021	Rijeka	20	(0)
2018–2019	→ Krško (loan)	29	(0)
2019–2020	→ Varaždin (loan)	13	(0)
2021–	Dinamo Zagreb	13	(0)
2021	→ Rijeka (loan)	21	(0)
2023	→ Celje (loan)	7	(0)
2023–2024	→ Slaven Belupo (loan)	30	(1)
2024–2025	→ Győri ETO (loan)	27	(4)
2025–	Győri ETO	32	(3)

International career
2020	Croatia U21	1	(0)
- * Club domestic league appearances and goals as of 30 May 2026

Daniel Štefulj (born 8 November 1999) is a Croatian professional footballer who plays as a left-back for Nemzeti Bajnokság I club Győri ETO.

== Club career ==
Štefulj spent his youth years with Međimurje, Varaždin and NK Zagreb. He started his senior career with NK Zagreb in 2017. In February 2018, he was signed by Rijeka of the Croatian top division. Rijeka loaned Štefulj to Krško in 2018, and then to Varaždin in 2019. In January 2020, he returned to Rijeka.

== Personal life ==
His father Danijel Štefulj was also a footballer.

== Career statistics ==
=== Club ===
As of match played 23 August 2025

Appearances and goals by club, season and competition
Club	Season	League			National Cup (Note: Including Slovenian Cup, Croatian Cup)		Europe		Other		Total	
Club	Season	Division	Apps	Goals	Apps	Goals	Apps	Goals	Apps	Goals	Apps	Goals
Krško (loan)	2018–19	Prva Liga	29	0	3	0	—		—		32	0
Varaždin (loan)	2019–20	SuperSport HNL	13	0	0	0	—		—		13	0
Rijeka	2019–20	SuperSport HNL	9	0	3	0	—		—		12	0
Rijeka	2020–21	SuperSport HNL	32	0	3	0	8 (Note: Appearance(s) in UEFA Europa League)	0	—		43	0
Rijeka	Total		41	0	6	0	8	0	—		55	0
Dinamo Zagreb	2021–22	SuperSport HNL	10	0	0	0	4 (Note: One appearances in UEFA Champions League, three appearances in UEFA Europa League)	0	—		14	0
Dinamo Zagreb	2022–23	SuperSport HNL	3	0	1	0	0	0	—		4	0
Dinamo Zagreb	Total		13	0	1	0	4	0	—		18	0
Celje (loan)	2022–23	Prva Liga	7	0	1	0	—		—		8	0
Slaven Belupo (loan)	2023–24	SuperSport HNL	30	1	1	1	—		—		31	2
Győri ETO (loan)	2024–25	NB I	27	4	3	2	—		—		30	6
Career total			160	5	15	3	12	0	—		187	8

== Honours ==
Győr

- Nemzeti Bajnokság I: 2025–26
