= Ștefan Vlădoiu =

Romanian footballer

Personal information
- Full name: Ștefan Marinel Vlădoiu
- Date of birth: 28 December 1998 (age 27)
- Place of birth: Râmnicu Vâlcea, Romania
- Height: 1.78 m (5 ft 10 in)
- Position: Right-back

Team information
- Current team: Győr
- Number: 2

Youth career
- –2014: Casa Bogdan
- 2014–2017: Universitatea Craiova

Senior career*
| Years | Team | Apps | (Gls) |
| 2016–2025 | Universitatea Craiova | 133 | (1) |
| 2017–2018 | → Sportul Snagov (loan) | 49 | (2) |
| 2019 | → Dunărea Călărași (loan) | 6 | (0) |
| 2022–2023 | → Universitatea Cluj (loan) | 14 | (0) |
| 2025 | Kolos Kovalivka | 6 | (0) |
| 2025– | Győr | 24 | (0) |

International career
| 2019–2021 | Romania U21 | 3 | (0) |
- * Club domestic league appearances and goals as of 25 October 2026

Ștefan Marinel Vlădoiu (born 28 December 1998) is a Romanian professional footballer who plays as a right-back for Nemzeti Bajnokság I club Győr.

== Career ==
On 26 January 2025 he moved to Kolos Kovalivka in Ukrainian Premier League.

== Career statistics ==
=== Club ===
As of match played 25 October 2026

Appearances and goals by club, season and competition
| Club | Season | League | | | National cup (Note: Includes Cupa României, Magyar Kupa) | | Europe | | Other | | Total | |
| Club | Season | Division | Apps | Goals | Apps | Goals | Apps | Goals | Apps | Goals | Apps | Goals |
|---|---|---|---|---|---|---|---|---|---|---|---|---|
| Universitatea Craiova | 2016–17 | Liga I | 1 | 0 | 0 | 0 | – | | 0 | 0 | 1 | 0 |
| Universitatea Craiova | 2017–18 | Liga I | 0 | 0 | – | | 0 | 0 | – | | 0 | 0 |
| Universitatea Craiova | 2019–20 | Liga I | 21 | 0 | 0 | 0 | 0 | 0 | – | | 21 | 0 |
| Universitatea Craiova | 2020–21 | Liga I | 27 | 0 | 4 | 0 | 0 | 0 | – | | 31 | 0 |
| Universitatea Craiova | 2021–22 | Liga I | 26 | 1 | 1 | 0 | 1 (Note: Appearances in UEFA Conference League) | 0 | 2 (Note: One appearance in Supercupa României, one appearance in Liga I European play-offs) | 0 | 30 | 0 |
| Universitatea Craiova | 2022–23 | Liga I | 16 | 0 | – | | 0 | 0 | – | | 16 | 0 |
| Universitatea Craiova | 2023–24 | Liga I | 25 | 0 | 3 | 0 | 2 | 0 | 0 | 0 | 30 | 0 |
| Universitatea Craiova | 2024–25 | Liga I | 17 | 0 | 0 | 0 | 2 | 0 | – | | 19 | 0 |
| Universitatea Craiova | Total | | 133 | 1 | 8 | 0 | 5 | 0 | 2 | 0 | 148 | 1 |
| Sportul Snagov (loan) | 2017–18 | Liga II | 28 | 2 | 0 | 0 | – | | – | | 28 | 2 |
| Sportul Snagov (loan) | 2018–19 | Liga II | 21 | 0 | 0 | 0 | – | | – | | 21 | 0 |
| Sportul Snagov (loan) | Total | | 49 | 2 | 2 | 0 | – | | – | | 49 | 2 |
| Dunărea Călărași (loan) | 2018–19 | Liga I | 6 | 0 | 0 | 0 | – | | – | | 6 | 0 |
| Universitatea Cluj (loan) | 2022–23 | Liga I | 14 | 0 | 3 | 0 | – | | – | | 17 | 0 |
| Kolos Kovalivka | 2024–25 | Ukrainian Premier League | 6 | 0 | – | | – | | – | | 6 | 0 |
| Győr | 2025–26 | Nemzeti Bajnokság I | 21 | 0 | 3 | 0 | 4 | 0 | – | | 28 | 0 |
| Győr | 2026–27 | Nemzeti Bajnokság I | 3 | 0 | 1 | 0 | 3 (Note: Two appearances in UEFA Champions League, one appearance in UEFA Conference League) | 0 | – | | 7 | 0 |
| Győr | Total | | 24 | 0 | 4 | 0 | 7 | 0 | – | | 35 | 0 |
| Career total | | | 232 | 3 | 17 | 0 | 12 | 0 | 2 | 0 | 263 | 3 |

== Honours ==
Universitatea Craiova

- Cupa României: 2020–21
- Supercupa României: 2021

Győr

- Nemzeti Bajnokság I: 2025–26
