= Željko Gavrić =

Serbian association footballer

Personal information
- Date of birth: 5 December 2000 (age 25)
- Place of birth: Ugljevik, Bosnia and Herzegovina
- Height: 1.81 m (5 ft 11 in)
- Position: Winger

Team information
- Current team: Győri ETO
- Number: 80

Youth career
- 2014–2018: Red Star Belgrade

Senior career*
Years	Team	Apps	(Gls)
2018–2021	Red Star Belgrade	37	(9)
2018–2019	→ Grafičar Beograd (loan)	44	(16)
2021–2023	Ferencváros	10	(0)
2022–2023	→ DAC Dunajská Streda (loan)	15	(2)
2023–2025	DAC Dunajská Streda	13	(3)
2024–2025	→ Győri ETO (loan)	29	(2)
2025–	Győri ETO	28	(6)

International career^{‡}
2016–2017	Serbia U17	8	(2)
2018–2019	Serbia U19	5	(0)
2019–2021	Serbia U21	10	(1)
2021–	Serbia	2	(0)
- * Club domestic league appearances and goals as of 30 May 2026 ‡ National team caps and goals as of 12 October 2021

Željko Gavrić (Serbian Cyrillic: Жељко Гаврић; born 5 December 2000) is a professional footballer who plays as a winger for Győri ETO FC. Born in Bosnia, he plays for the Serbia national team.

== Club career ==
=== Red Star Belgrade ===
On 15 August 2018, Gavrić was loaned to Red Star's feeder team, Grafičar. On 29 September 2019, he scored his first hat trick as a professional in a 4–2 victory against Dinamo Vranje in the Serbian First League. On 13 November 2019, he extended his contract with Red Star to the summer of 2023.

=== Ferencváros ===
On 12 August 2021, Gavrić completed a move to Hungarian champions Ferencvárosi for estimated fee of €1.2 million. He signed four-year contract with the club.

=== DAC Dunajská Streda ===
On 15 June 2023, Gavrić signed for Slovak Super Liga club DAC Dunajská Streda on a three-year deal. He had spent the previous season with the club on loan before they activated their purchase option.

== International career ==
Gavrić made his debut for Serbia national team on 7 June 2021 in a friendly against Jamaica.

== Career statistics ==
=== Club ===
As of 15 May 2022

Appearances and goals by club, season and competition
Club	Season	League			Cup		Continental		Total	
Club	Season	Division	Apps	Goals	Apps	Goals	Apps	Goals	Apps	Goals
Grafičar Beograd (loan)	2018–19	Serbian League Belgrade	24	9	0	0	—		24	9
Grafičar Beograd (loan)	2019–20	Serbian First League	20	7	0	0	—		20	7
Grafičar Beograd (loan)	Total		44	16	0	0	—		44	16
Red Star Belgrade	2019–20	Serbian SuperLiga	9	1	2	0	—		11	1
Red Star Belgrade	2020–21	Serbian SuperLiga	27	8	1	0	3	0	31	8
Red Star Belgrade	2021–22	Serbian SuperLiga	1	0	0	0	1	0	2	0
Red Star Belgrade	Total		37	9	3	0	4	0	44	9
Ferencvárosi	2021–22	NB I	10	0	3	1	2	0	15	1
Career total			91	25	6	1	6	0	103	26

=== International ===
As of 11 June 2021

Appearances and goals by national team and year
National team	Year	Apps	Goals
Serbia	2021	2	0
Total		2	0

== Honours ==
Grafičar Beograd

- Serbian League Belgrade: 2018–19

Red Star Belgrade

- Serbian SuperLiga: 2019–20, 2020–21
- Serbian Cup: 2020–21

Ferencváros

- Nemzeti Bajnokság I: 2021–22
- Magyar Kupa: 2021–22

Győr

- Nemzeti Bajnokság I: 2025–26
