= Jovan Živković =

Austrian football player (born 2006)

Personal information
- Full name: Jovan Živković
- Date of birth: 23 May 2006 (age 20)
- Place of birth: Vienna, Austria
- Height: 1.73 m (5 ft 8 in)
- Position: Forward

Team information
- Current team: Radnički 1923 (on loan from Győr)
- Number: 70

Senior career*
Years	Team	Apps	(Gls)
2023–	Rapid Wien II	51	(18)
2024–2025	Rapid Wien	7	(0)
2025–	Győri ETO	7	(0)
2026–	→ Radnički 1923 (loan)	0	(0)
- * Club domestic league appearances and goals as of 26 May 2026

Jovan Živković (born 23 May 2006) is an Austrian professional footballer who plays as a striker for Serbian SuperLiga club Radnički 1923, on loan from Nemzeti Bajnokság I club Győri ETO FC.

== Club career ==
A product of the Rapid Wien academy, he signed a three-year professional contract with the club in May 2023 on his 17th birthday, ten maximum time allowed for a player of his age. At the start of the 2023–24 season he began to be introduced to the Rapid Wien first team and made the substitutes bench in the Austrian Bundesliga for the first time in September 2023 for a match against Red Bull Salzburg. He made his debut for the first team on 4 February 2024 in the ÖFB Cup against SKN St. Pölten. The following week, he made his debut in the Bundesliga against Wolfsberger AC.

On 20 July 2025, Živković signed with Nemzeti Bajnokság I club Győri ETO FC.

On 28 July 2026, Živković joined Serbian SuperLiga club Radnički 1923 on a one-year loan deal with an option to make transfer permanent.

== International career ==
He played for Serbia at U16 level before playing youth football for Austria U17 from 2022.

== Personal life ==
He is of Serbian descent.

== Honours ==
Győr

- Nemzeti Bajnokság I: 2025–26
