= Fábio Vianna =

Portuguese footballer

Personal information
- Full name: Fábio André Freitas Vianna
- Date of birth: 8 October 1998 (age 28)
- Place of birth: Vila Real, Portugal
- Height: 1.81 m (5 ft 11 in)
- Position: Left back

Team information
- Current team: Sepsi OSK
- Number: 3

Youth career
- 2007–2010: Abambres
- 2010–2012: Vila Real
- 2012–2013: Abambres
- 2013–2014: Benfica
- 2014–2017: Chaves

Senior career*
Years	Team	Apps	(Gls)
2017–2018	Chaves B	7	(4)
2018–2020	Braga B	10	(1)
2020–2022	Académica	44	(2)
2022–2023	Argeș Pitești	15	(0)
2023	Farul Constanța	3	(0)
2023–2025	Győr	34	(0)
2025–	Sepsi OSK	34	(1)
- * Club domestic league appearances and goals as of 8 November 2026

Fábio André Freitas Vianna (born 8 October 1998) is a Portuguese professional footballer who plays as a defender for Liga I club Sepsi OSK.

== Football career ==
He made his professional debut for Académica on 20 September 2020 in the Liga Portugal 2.

== Honours ==
Farul Constanța

- Supercupa României runner-up: 2023
