= Samuel Petráš (footballer) =

Slovak footballer (born 1999)

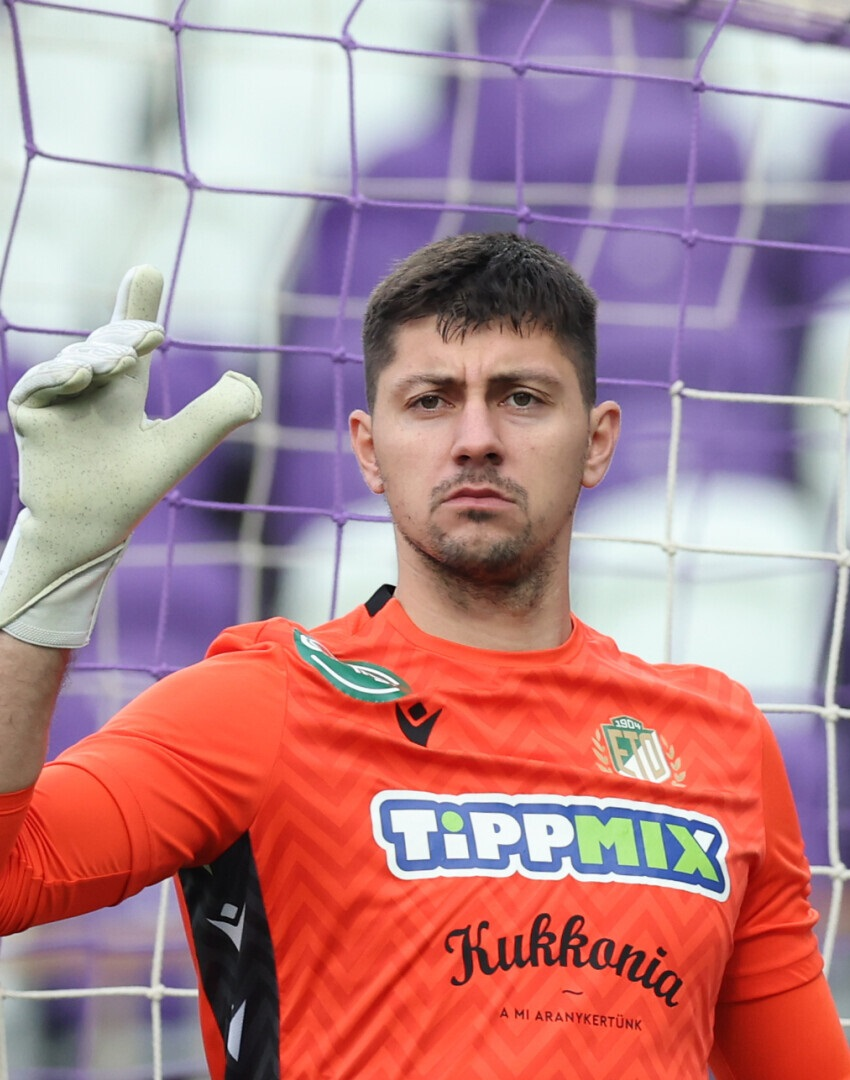
- Petráš playing for Győr in 2025

Personal information
- Date of birth: 10 April 1999 (age 27)
- Place of birth: Žilina, Slovakia
- Height: 1.92 m (6 ft 4 in)
- Position: Goalkeeper

Team information
- Current team: Győr
- Number: 99

Youth career
- 2007–2010: FK Rajec
- 2010–2018: Žilina

Senior career*
Years	Team	Apps	(Gls)
2017–2021	Žilina B	49	(0)
2019–2023	Žilina	53	(0)
2022–2023	→ DAC Dunajská Streda (loan)	25	(0)
2023–2024	DAC Dunajská Streda	1	(0)
2024–	Győr	46	(0)

International career^{‡}
2016	Slovakia U17	1	(0)
2019–2020	Slovakia U21	4	(0)
- * Club domestic league appearances and goals as of 30 May 2026 ‡ National team caps and goals as of 17 November 2020

Samuel Petráš (born 10 April 1999) is a Slovak professional footballer who plays as a goalkeeper for Nemzeti Bajnokság I club Győr.

== Club career ==
=== MŠK Žilina ===
Petráš made his Fortuna Liga debut for Žilina on 14 June 2020 during a home match against Spartak Trnava, in which Šošoni recorded a 2:1 win. Petráš conceded the single goal from Bamidele Yusuf.

=== Győr ===
On 8 August 2024, Petráš signed a two-year contract with Győr in Hungary. On 14 August 2025, he saved a crucial penalty in a 2-0 victpry over AIK Fotboll in the third round of the 2025–26 UEFA Conference League qualifying at the ETO Park.

== International career ==
Petráš was first recognised as an alternate broader squad member by Štefan Tarkovič for the senior Slovak national team on 28 September ahead of two 2022 FIFA World Cup qualifiers against Russia and Croatia. In December 2022, Petráš was nominated by Francesco Calzona, who joined the side in late summer, for Slovak national team prospective players' training camp at NTC Senec.

== Honours ==
Győr

- Nemzeti Bajnokság I: 2025–26

Individual

- Slovak Super Liga U-21 Team of the Season: 2020-21
- Slovak Super Liga Best Goalkeeper: 2022–23
