= Samsondin Ouro =

Togolese footballer (born 2000)

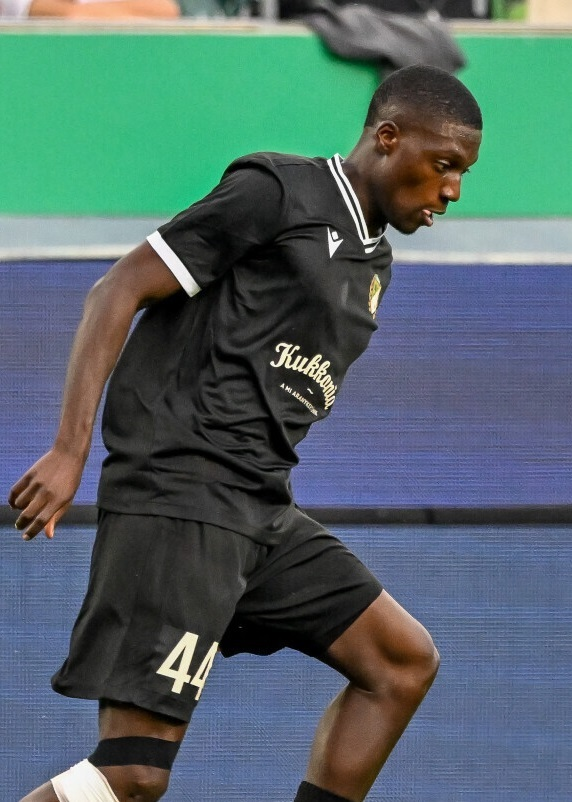
- Ouro playing for Győr in 2025

Personal information
- Date of birth: 2 March 2000 (age 26)
- Place of birth: Reutlingen, Germany
- Height: 1.83 m (6 ft 0 in)
- Position: Midfielder

Team information
- Current team: DAC 1904
- Number: 44

Youth career
- –2019: SSV Reutlingen
- 2019–2020: Dinamo Zagreb

Senior career*
Years	Team	Apps	(Gls)
2019–2020	Dinamo Zagreb II	0	(0)
2021–2023	Mura	32	(1)
2022–2023	→ Radomlje (loan)	21	(3)
2023–2024	Al-Adalah		
2024–2025	Győr	28	(5)
2025–	DAC 1904	30	(2)

International career^{‡}
2022–	Togo	8	(0)
- * Club domestic league appearances and goals as of 21 September 2026 ‡ National team caps and goals as of 15:14, 23 November 2025 (UTC)

Samsondin Ouro (born 2 March 2000) is a footballer who plays as a midfielder for Slovak First Football League club DAC 1904. Born in Germany, he plays for the Togo national team.

== Club career ==
In 2019, Ouro joined the youth academy of Dinamo Zagreb, Croatia's most successful club, from the youth academy of SSV Reutlingen.

Before the second half of the 2020–21 season, he signed for the Slovenian top flight side Mura.

On 23 July 2023, Ouro joined Saudi Arabian club Al-Adalah.

On 2 August 2025 it was confirmed, that Ouro had joined Slovak First Football League club DAC 1904 on a deal until June 2028.

== International career ==
Born in Germany, Ouro is Togolese by descent. He debuted for the Togo national team in a 3–0 friendly win over Sierra Leone on 24 March 2022.

== Honours ==
Mura

- Slovenian PrvaLiga: 2020–21

Győr

- Nemzeti Bajnokság I: 2025–26
