= 2021–22 NK Lokomotiva Zagreb season =

Lokomotiva
2021–22 season
- Chairman: Miroslav Gluhinić
- Manager: Silvijo Čabraja
- Stadium: Stadion Kranjčevićeva
- Prva HNL: 5th
- Croatian Cup: Quarter-finals
Home colours	Away colours

The 2021–22 season is the 108th season in the existence of NK Lokomotiva Zagreb and the club's 13th consecutive season in the top flight of Croatian football. In addition to the domestic league, NK Lokomotiva Zagreb participated in this season's edition of the Croatian Cup.

== Players ==
=== First-team squad ===
As of 20 April 2022

Note: Flags indicate national team as defined under FIFA eligibility rules; some limited exceptions apply. Players may hold more than one non-FIFA nationality.

No.	Pos.	Nation	Player
1	GK	CRO	Ivan Nevistić (on loan from Dinamo Zagreb)
4	MF	CRO	Mate Maleš
5	DF	ALB	Jon Mersinaj
6	DF	ALB	Hajdin Salihu
7	FW	NGR	Ibrahim Aliyu
8	MF	CRO	Ivan Roca
10	FW	ALB	Indrit Tuci
11	MF	CRO	Lukas Kačavenda
13	DF	CRO	Ivan Čeliković
14	MF	BIH	Mateo Marić
15	DF	KOS	Art Smakaj
16	DF	NED	Justin de Haas
17	DF	BIH	Ivan Milićević

No.	Pos.	Nation	Player
18	MF	ALB	Enis Çokaj
19	DF	CRO	Josip Pivarić (Captain)
20	DF	CRO	Nikola Soldo
22	MF	CRO	Silvio Goričan
23	MF	CRO	Luka Stojković
24	DF	BIH	Branimir Cipetić
25	DF	BIH	Kemal Osmanković
27	FW	CRO	Marko Vranjković
29	FW	CRO	Sandro Kulenović (on loan from Dinamo Zagreb)
30	MF	CRO	Jakov-Anton Vasilj (on loan from Dinamo Zagreb)
32	GK	CRO	Krševan Santini (Vice-captain)
—	GK	UKR	Mykyta Turbayevskyi (on loan from Shakhtar Donetsk)
—	MF	UKR	Illya Hulko (on loan from Shakhtar Donetsk)

=== Other players under contract ===
Note: Flags indicate national team as defined under FIFA eligibility rules; some limited exceptions apply. Players may hold more than one non-FIFA nationality.

No. / Pos. / Nation / Player; — / DF / FRA / Théo Barbet	No. / Pos. / Nation / Player; — / FW / ALB / Francesco Tahiraj

=== Out on loan ===
Note: Flags indicate national team as defined under FIFA eligibility rules; some limited exceptions apply. Players may hold more than one non-FIFA nationality.

No.	Pos.	Nation	Player
2	DF	ALB	Albion Marku (at Partizani Tirana until 30 June 2022)
28	MF	CRO	Luka Dajčer (at Jarun Zagreb until 30 June 2022)
59	FW	ALB	Sherif Kallaku (at Partizani Tirana until 30 June 2022)
—	GK	CRO	Luka Matasović (at Mladost Ždralovi until 30 June 2022)
—	GK	GER	Marin Topić (at Jadran Luka Ploče until 30 June 2022)
—	GK	CRO	Matija Jesenović (at Međimurje until 30 June 2022)
—	DF	ALB	Keslin Shani (at Laçi until 30 June 2022)

No.	Pos.	Nation	Player
—	DF	CRO	Marko Šuto (at Croatia Zmijavci until 30 June 2022)
—	MF	CRO	Dalibor Vrbanić (at Jarun Zagreb until 30 June 2022)
—	MF	CRO	Gabriel Groznica (at Jarun Zagreb until 30 June 2022)
—	MF	CRO	Lovro Dobrić (at Jarun Zagreb until 30 June 2022)
—	FW	ALB	Arbër Mehmetllari (at Dinamo Tirana until 30 June 2022)
—	FW	CRO	Bruno Zdunić (at Sesvete until 30 June 2022)
—	FW	AUT	Raul Florucz (at Jarun Zagreb until 30 June 2022)
—	FW	CRO	Vanja Pelko (at Zagorec until 30 June 2022)

== Pre-season and friendlies ==
Win Draw Loss Fixtures

6 August 2021 Friendly	Panathinaikos (Greece)	2–2	(Croatia) Lokomotiva	Athens, Greece
21:00 EEST (UTC+3)	Chatzigiovanis 40' (pen.), 41'		Kačavenda 18'; Artistico 87'	Stadium: Grigoris Lambrakis Stadium

== Competitions ==
=== Overall record ===
Competition	First match	Last match	Starting round	Final position	Record							
Competition	First match	Last match	Starting round	Final position	Pld	W	D	L	GF	GA	GD	Win %
Prva HNL	17 July 2021	20 May 2022	Matchday 1	5th	36	12	13	11	55	50	+5	33.33
Croatian Cup	21 September 2021	30 November 2021	First round	Quarter-finals	3	1	1	1	7	9	−2	33.33
Total					39	13	14	12	62	59	+3	33.33

Last updated: 20 May 2022
Source: Soccerway

=== Prva HNL ===
==== League table ====
Pos	Team	Pld	W	D	L	GF	GA	GD	Pts	Qualification or relegation
3	Osijek	36	19	12	5	49	29	+20	69	Qualification to Europa Conference League second qualifying round
4	Rijeka	36	20	5	11	71	51	+20	65	Qualification to Europa Conference League second qualifying round
5	Lokomotiva	36	12	13	11	55	50	+5	49	
6	Gorica	36	12	9	15	43	50	−7	45	
7	Slaven Belupo	36	9	9	18	35	54	−19	36	

Source: PrvaHNL.hr
Rules for classification: 1) Points; 2) Head-to-head points; 3) Head-to-head goal difference; 4) Head-to-head goals scored (at home if two teams tied); 5) Goal difference; 6) Goals scored; 7) Play-off
(Note: Criteria 2-4 and 7 is only used if deciding champion, teams to international competition or teams for relegation and in that case criteria 6 will not be used).

==== Results summary ====
Overall								Home						Away					
Pld	W	D	L	GF	GA	GD	Pts	W	D	L	GF	GA	GD	W	D	L	GF	GA	GD
3	2	1	0	7	5	+2	7	1	1	0	5	4	+1	1	0	0	2	1	+1

Last updated: 30 July 2021.
Source: Prva HNL

==== Results by round ====
Round	1	2	3	4	5	6	7	8	9	10	11	12	13	14	15	16	17	18	19	20	21	22	23	24	25	26	27	28	29	30	31	32	33	34	35	36
Ground	H	A	H	A	H	A	H	H	A	A	H	A	H	A	H	A	A	H	H	A	H	A	H	A	H	H	A	A	H	A	H	A	H	A	A	H
Result	D	W	W	W	W	L	L	D	L	L	W	D	L	L	W	D	L	D	D	L	W	L	D	D	W	D	W	L	W	D	W	D	D	D	L	W
Position																																				

Updated to match(es) played on 20 May 2022. Source: Prva HNL
A = Away; H = Home; W = Win; D = Draw; L = Loss

==== Matches ====
The league fixtures were announced on 8 June 2021.

17 July 2021 1	Lokomotiva	2–2	Hajduk Split	Zagreb
18:55 CEST (UTC+2)	Soldo 42'; Dabro 47'; Kačavenda (yellow card) 68'; Marić (yellow card) 84'	Report	Mlakar 30', 55'	Stadium: Stadion Kranjčevićeva; Attendance: 1,000; Referee: Tihomir Pejin

24 July 2021 2	Slaven Belupo	1–2	Lokomotiva	Koprivnica
18:55 CEST (UTC+2)	Krstanović 66' (pen.)	Report	Çokaj 22'; Pivarić 80'	Stadium: Gradski stadion Attendance: 513; Referee: Dario Bel

30 July 2021 3	Lokomotiva	3–2	Hrvatski Dragovoljac	Zagreb
20:00 CEST (UTC+2)		Report		Stadium: Stadion Kranjčevićeva; Attendance: 182; Referee: Dario Kulušić

14 August 2021 5	Lokomotiva	4–0	Istra 1961	Zagreb
18:55 CEST (UTC+2)	Cipetić (yellow card) 6'; Kačavenda (yellow card) 13'; Dabro 20', 49', (yellow card) 20'; Aliyu 31', 45'; De Haas (yellow card) 65'	Report	Navarro (yellow card) 24'; Blagojević (yellow card) 33'; Daničić (yellow card) 68'	Stadium: Stadion Kranjčevićeva; Attendance: 307; Referee: Tihomir Pejin

21 August 2021 6	Dinamo Zagreb	1–0	Lokomotiva	Zagreb
21:00 CEST (UTC+2)	Oršić 77'	Report		Stadium: Stadion Maksimir; Attendance: 1,190; Referee: Dario Kulušić

28 August 2021 7	Lokomotiva	0–1	Gorica	Zagreb
18:55 CEST (UTC+02:00)	Çokaj (yellow card) 39'; Aliyu (yellow card) 72'	Report	Lovrić 74'; Kalik (yellow card) 78'; Doka (yellow card) 82'; Steenvoorden (yellow card) 88'; Jovičić (yellow card) 89'	Stadium: Stadion Kranjčevićeva; Attendance: 384; Referee: Duje Strukan

12 September 2021 8	Lokomotiva	1–1	Osijek	Zagreb
19:05 CEST (UTC+2)	Nevistić (yellow card) 40'; Kačavenda (yellow card) 62'; Dabro 70'	Report	Miérez (yellow card) 35'; Fiolić (yellow card) 36' (yellow-red card) 75'; Topčagić (yellow card) 82', (goal) 90+2'; Škorić (yellow card) 85'; Nejašmić (yellow card) 86'	Stadium: Stadion Kranjčevićeva; Attendance: 491; Referee: Mario Zebec

26 September 2021 10	Hajduk Split	1–0	Lokomotiva	Split
19:05 CEST (UTC+2)	Livaja (yellow card) 9', (goal) 80'; Simić (yellow card) 41'	Report	Maleš (yellow card) 41'; Kačavenda (yellow card) 56'; Marić (yellow card) 63'; Pivarić (yellow card) 70'; De Haas (yellow card) 78'; Cipetić (yellow card) 90+2'	Stadium: Stadion Poljud; Attendance: 7,657; Referee: Ivan Bebek

20 October 2021 4	Rijeka	1–2	Lokomotiva	Rijeka
17:00 CEST (UTC+2)	Escoval (yellow card) 26'; Obregón (yellow card) 64'; Jurišić (yellow card) 67'; Drmić 82'	Report	Milićević 15'; Dabro (yellow card) 28', (goal) 58'; Çokaj (yellow card) 36'; Cipetić (yellow card) 88'	Stadium: Rujevica; Attendance: 2,361; Referee: Dario Kulušić

24 October 2021 13	Lokomotiva	0–2	Rijeka	Zagreb
17:30 CEST (UTC+2)	Kačavenda (yellow card) 70'	Report	Issah (yellow card) 41'; Murić 45+1'; Gnezda Čerin (yellow card) 51'; Drmić 64', (penalty missed) 81'; Smolčić (yellow card) 73'	Stadium: Kranjčevićeva; Attendance: 571; Referee: Dario Bel

1 November 2021 14	Istra 1961	2–1	Lokomotiva	Pula
18:00 CET (UTC+1)	Nevistić 8' (o.g.); Bandé (yellow card) 20'; Marin (yellow card) 38'; Galilea (yellow card) 38'; Beljo 54' (pen.); Serderov (yellow card) 90+2'	Report	Dabro 15'; Mersinaj (yellow card) 33'; Cipetić (yellow card) 45'; Florucz (yellow card) 84'	Stadium: Stadion Aldo Drosina; Attendance: 261; Referee: Igor Pajač

7 November 2021 15	Lokomotiva	1–0	Dinamo Zagreb	Zagreb
15:00 CET (UTC+1)	Marić 8', (yellow card) 22'; De Haas (yellow card) 27'; Soldo (yellow card) 90+7'; Goričan (yellow card) 90+7'; Santini (yellow card) 90+8'	Report	Théophile-Catherine (yellow card) 35'; Petković (penalty missed) 38', (yellow card) 90+6'	Stadium: Stadion Kranjčevićeva; Attendance: 2,027; Referee: Igor Pajač

21 November 2021 16	Gorica	2–2	Lokomotiva	Velika Gorica
15:00 CET (UTC+1)	Fruk 3'; Pršir 24'; Jovičić (yellow card) 43'; Stojanovski (yellow card) 56'	Report	Aliyu 34'; Cipetić (yellow card) 50'; Kačavenda (yellow card) 53'; Pivarić 60'	Stadium: Stadion Radnik; Attendance: 350; Referee: Dario Bel

26 November 2021 17	Osijek	3–1	Lokomotiva	Osijek
18:00 CET (UTC+1)	Bartolec (yellow card) 39'; Nejašmić 40'; Fiolić (yellow card) 51', (goal) 90+6'; Jugović (yellow card) 57'; Miérez (yellow card) 70'; Bočkaj (yellow card) 76'; Daku 86'	Report	Kulenović 9'; Aliyu (yellow card) 12' (yellow-red card) 72'; Marić (yellow card) 37'; Çokaj (yellow card) 58' (yellow-red card) 90+3'; Soldo (yellow card) 76'	Stadium: Stadion Gradski vrt Attendance: 1,083; Referee: Igor Pajač

11 December 2021 19	Lokomotiva	3–3	Hajduk Split	Zagreb
15:00 CET (UTC+1)	Elez 11' (o.g.); Mersinaj (yellow card) 48'; Marić 63', (yellow card) 69'; Kačavenda (yellow card) 83'; Katić 86' (o.g.)	Report	Livaja 34'; Mlakar 77', 81'; Katić (yellow card) 78'	Stadium: Stadion Kranjčevićeva; Attendance: 2,776; Referee: Tihomir Pejin

5 February 2022 22	Rijeka	3–2	Lokomotiva	Rijeka
17:30 CET (UTC+1)	Murić 25', 39'; Solano (yellow card) 37'; Vučkić 60'; Čestić (yellow card) 85'; Vuk (yellow card) 90+3'	Report	Çokaj (yellow card) 45'; Mersinaj (yellow card) 56'; Dabro 58'; Kačavenda (yellow card) 68'; Kulenović 79', (yellow card) 90'	Stadium: Rujevica; Attendance: 2,855; Referee: Duje Strukan

12 February 2022 23	Lokomotiva	1–1	Istra 1961	Zagreb
15:00 CET (UTC+1)	Salihu (yellow card) 8' (yellow-red card) 43'; Kulenović 80'; Çokaj (yellow card) 90'; Aliyu (yellow card) 90+2'	Report	Galilea (yellow card) 50'; Beljo 54'; Mahmoud (yellow card) 56'; Perera (yellow card) 59'; Perković (yellow card) 75'	Stadium: Stadion Kranjčevićeva; Attendance: 326; Referee: Tihomir Pejin

20 February 2022 24	Dinamo Zagreb	0–0	Lokomotiva	Zagreb
17:05 CET (UTC+1)	Lauritsen (yellow card) 2'; Štefulj (yellow card) 90+3'	Report	Mersinaj (yellow card) 17'; Marić (yellow card) 74'; Dabro (yellow card) 77'; Kačavenda (yellow card) 83'	Stadium: Stadion Maksimir; Attendance: 1,886; Referee: Igor Pajač

26 February 2022 25	Lokomotiva	2–0	Gorica	Zagreb
15:00 CET (UTC+1)	Kulenović 18'; Smakaj (yellow card) 39'; Dabro 71'	Report	Kotarski (yellow card) 59'; Atiemwen (yellow card) 61'	Stadium: Stadion Kranjčevićeva; Attendance: 319; Referee: Dario Kulušić

4 March 2022 26	Lokomotiva	0–0	Osijek	Zagreb
18:00 CET (UTC+1)	Mersinaj (yellow card) 85'	Report	Škorić (yellow card) 31'	Stadium: Stadion Kranjčevićeva; Attendance: 884; Referee: Mario Zebec

19 March 2022 28	Hajduk Split	4–0	Lokomotiva	Split
17:05 CET (UTC+1)	Kalinić 22'; Krovinović 43'; Melnjak 54'; Sahiti 62'; Lovrencsics (yellow card) 79'; Ljubičić (yellow card) 90'	Report	Pivarić (yellow card) 33'; Maleš (yellow card) 45+2'; Dabro (yellow card) 56'; Mersinaj (yellow card) 90+1'	Stadium: Stadion Poljud; Attendance: 11,873; Referee: Igor Pajač

16 April 2022 31	Lokomotiva	2–1	Rijeka	Zagreb
19:10 CEST (UTC+2)	Milićević (yellow card) 11'; Stojković 38'; Kačavenda 46'; Cipetić (yellow card) 77'; Salihu (yellow card) 87'	Report	Drmić 90+2'	Stadium: Kranjčevićeva; Attendance: 885; Referee: Dario Bel

23 April 2022 32	Istra 1961	2–2	Lokomotiva	Pula
17:00 CEST (UTC+2)	Beljo 16'; Perera (yellow card) 37'; Cáseres 68'; Perković (yellow card) 85'	Report	Marić 27'; Mersinaj (yellow card) 47'; Kulenović 90+5'	Stadium: Stadion Aldo Drosina; Attendance: 500; Referee: Dario Bel

1 May 2022 33	Lokomotiva	1–1	Dinamo Zagreb	Zagreb
19:05 CEST (UTC+2)	Kulenović 30' (pen.); Mersinaj (yellow card) 82'; Marić (yellow card) 88'	Report	Soldo 50' (o.g.)	Stadium: Stadion Kranjčevićeva; Attendance: 3,857; Referee: Ivan Bebek

7 May 2022 34	Gorica	3–3	Lokomotiva	Velika Gorica
17:00 CEST (UTC+2)	Pršir (yellow card) 13'; Atiemwen 24'; Keita (yellow card) 30' (yellow-red card) 43'; Kalik 40', 90' (pen.), (yellow card) 82'; Jovičić (yellow card) 43'; Mitrović (yellow card) 44'	Report	Çokaj (yellow card) 35'; Pivarić (yellow card) 38' (yellow-red card) 67', (goal) 42'; Aliyu 63'; Kulenović 85'	Stadium: Stadion Radnik; Attendance: 723; Referee: Tihomir Pejin

15 May 2022 35	Osijek	1–0	Lokomotiva	Osijek
17:00 CEST (UTC+2)	Žaper 25'; Brlek (yellow card) 42'; Jurčević (yellow card) 53'; Bralić (yellow card) 90+3'	Report	Çokaj (yellow card) 48'; Kulenović (yellow card) 52'; Kačavenda (yellow card) 78'; Vranjković (yellow card) 78'; Soldo (yellow card) 87'	Stadium: Stadion Gradski vrt Attendance: 2,638; Referee: Duje Strukan
