= 2024–25 Győri ETO FC season =

Győr
2024–25 season
- Owner: Oszkár Világi
- Manager: Balázs Borbély
- Stadium: ETO Park
- Nemzeti Bajnokság I: 4th
- Magyar Kupa: Round of 16
- Top goalscorer: League: Claudiu Bumba (9); All: Claudiu Bumba (10)
- Highest home attendance: 7,999 v Ferencváros (24 May 2025, Nemzeti Bajnokság I)
- Lowest home attendance: 1,562 v Puskás Akadémia (4 December 2024, Nemzeti Bajnokság I)
- Average home league attendance: 3,942
- Biggest win: 6–2 v Putnok (Away, 14 September 2024, Magyar Kupa)
- Biggest defeat: 0–3 v Debrecen (Home, 2 August 2024, Nemzeti Bajnokság I)
Home colours	Away colours

The 2024–25 season was Győri Egyetértés Torna Osztály Futball Club's 70th competitive season, 119th year in existence as a football club and first season in the Nemzeti Bajnokság I following their promotion from the Nemzeti Bajnokság II in the previous season. In addition to the domestic league, Győr participated in that season's editions of the Magyar Kupa.

== Squad ==
Squad at end of season

Note: Flags indicate national team as defined under FIFA eligibility rules; some limited exceptions apply. Players may hold more than one non-FIFA nationality.

No.	Pos.	Nation	Player
3	DF	BRA	Heitor
5	MF	ROU	Paul Anton
6	MF	HUN	Rajmund Tóth
7	FW	MLI	Mamady Diarra
8	DF	ALB	Ledio Beqja
10	MF	ROU	Claudiu Bumba
11	FW	GAM	Nfansu Njie
12	GK	HUN	Barnabás Ruisz
13	DF	POR	Fábio Vianna
14	FW	ALG	Ahmed Nadhir Benbouali
16	MF	HUN	László Vingler
19	DF	SVK	János Szépe
20	DF	HUN	Barnabás Bíró
22	DF	ALB	Albion Marku
23	DF	CRO	Daniel Štefulj
24	MF	HUN	Miljan Krpić

No.	Pos.	Nation	Player
25	DF	ROU	Deian Boldor
26	GK	HUN	Erik Gyurákovics
27	MF	HUN	Milán Vitális
30	DF	CRO	Dino Grozdanić
33	DF	ALB	Eneo Bitri
39	MF	HUN	Marcell Herczeg
42	DF	HUN	Dávid Koncz
44	MF	TOG	Samsondin Ouro
47	MF	HUN	Ádám Décsy
57	DF	CZE	Filip Kaša
77	MF	TUN	Wajdi Sahli
80	FW	SRB	Željko Gavrić
90	MF	HUN	Kevin Bánáti
92	MF	SVK	Michal Škvarka
99	GK	SVK	Samuel Petráš

== Transfers ==
=== Transfers in ===
Transfer window	Pos.	No.	Player	From
Summer	DF	–	(Hungary) Martin Kulcsár	Youth team
Summer	DF	3	(Brazil) Heitor	(Estonia) FCI Levadia
Summer	FW	9	(Montenegro) Matija Krivokapić	(Slovakia) DAC Dunajská Streda
Summer	DF	22	(Albania) Albion Marku	Free agent (Note: Previous club Dinamo Tirana.)
Summer	MF	24	(Hungary) Miljan Krpić	(Serbia) Voždovac
Summer	MF	44	(Togo) Samsondin Ouro	(Saudi Arabia) Al-Adalah
Summer	MF	47	(Hungary) Ádám Décsy	Youth team
Summer	DF	57	(Czech Republic) Filip Kaša	(Slovakia) DAC Dunajská Streda
Summer	MF	77	(Tunisia) Wajdi Sahli	(Serbia) Radnički Kragujevac
Summer	GK	99	(Slovakia) Samuel Petráš	(Slovakia) DAC Dunajská Streda
Winter	DF	8	(Albania) Ledio Beqja	(Albania) Teuta Durrës
Winter	FW	11	(The Gambia) Nfansu Njie	Free agent (Note: Previous club Bordeaux.)
Winter	MF	39	(Hungary) Marcell Herczeg	Youth team

=== Transfers out ===
Transfer window	Pos.	No.	Player	To
Summer	MF	–	(Hungary) Máté Tuboly	(Slovakia) DAC Dunajská Streda
Summer	MF	8	(Brazil) Gabriel Boschilia	Released (Note: Joined Operário Ferroviário.)
Summer	DF	8	(Hungary) Gábor Buna	(Hungary) Tatabánya
Summer	DF	14	(Hungary) Attila Szujó	(Hungary) Kazincbarcika
Summer	DF	18	(Hungary) Dominik Csontos	(Hungary) Zalaegerszeg
Summer	FW	21	(Sudan) Yasin Hamed	(Libya) Al-Ittihad Tripoli
Summer	FW	32	(Hungary) Péter Hanzli	(Austria) Kallham
Summer	DF	66	(Italy) Matteo Lucarelli	Released (Note: Joined Olbia.)
Winter	DF	4	(Argentina) Luciano Vera	(Albania) Tirana
Winter	FW	27	(Serbia) Nenad Lukić	(Serbia) Spartak Subotica
Winter	FW	55	(Austria) Christopher Kröhn	(Austria) Floridsdorf

=== Loans in ===
Transfer window	Pos.	No.	Player	From	End date
Summer	FW	14	(Algeria) Ahmed Nadhir Benbouali	(Belgium) Charleroi	End of season
Summer	DF	23	(Croatia) Daniel Štefulj	(Croatia) Dinamo Zagreb	End of season
Summer	DF	33	(Albania) Eneo Bitri	(Norway) Vålerenga	End of season
Summer	FW	80	(Serbia) Željko Gavrić	(Slovakia) DAC Dunajská Streda	End of season
Winter	MF	27	(Hungary) Milán Vitális	(Slovakia) DAC Dunajská Streda	End of season
Winter	DF	30	(Croatia) Dino Grozdanić	(Greece) Asteras Tripolis	End of season

=== Loans out ===
Transfer window	Pos.	No.	Player	To	End date
Summer	FW	–	(Hungary) Alex Lacza	(Hungary) Szeged	Middle of season
Summer	MF	11	(Hungary) Bálint Csóka	(Slovakia) Šamorín	End of season
Summer	MF	16	(Hungary) László Vingler	(Hungary) Szentlőrinc	End of season
Summer	FW	96	(Hungary) Marcell Huszár	(Hungary) Diósgyőr	End of season
Summer	FW	97	(Hungary) Balázs Farkas	(Hungary) Honvéd	End of season
Winter	DF	–	(Hungary) Martin Kulcsár	(Hungary) Tatabánya	End of season
Winter	FW	–	(Hungary) Alex Lacza	(Hungary) Kozármisleny	End of season
Winter	FW	9	(Montenegro) Matija Krivokapić	(Slovakia) Komárno	End of season

== Competitions ==
=== Overview ===
Competition	First match	Last match	Starting round	Final position	Record							
Competition	First match	Last match	Starting round	Final position	Pld	W	D	L	GF	GA	GD	Win %
Nemzeti Bajnokság I	26 July 2024	24 May 2025	Matchday 1	4th	33	14	11	8	49	37	+12	42.42
Magyar Kupa	14 September 2024	27 February 2025	Round of 64	Round of 16	3	2	0	1	12	6	+6	66.67
Total					36	16	11	9	61	43	+18	44.44

Source: Competitions

=== Nemzeti Bajnokság I ===
==== League table ====
Pos	Team	Pld	W	D	L	GF	GA	GD	Pts	Qualification or relegation
2	Puskás Akadémia	33	20	6	7	58	38	+20	66	Qualification for the Conference League second qualifying round
3	Paks	33	16	9	8	65	47	+18	57	Qualification for the Europa League first qualifying round (Note: Paks qualified for the Europa League as the 2024–25 Magyar Kupa winners. As a result, the second Conference League berth was passed to the team in 4th place.)
4	Győr	33	14	11	8	49	37	+12	53	Qualification for the Conference League second qualifying round
5	MTK	33	13	7	13	53	47	+6	46	
6	Diósgyőr	33	11	11	11	43	51	−8	44	

Source: Hungarian Football Federation (in Hungarian)
Rules for classification: 1) Points; 2) Matches won; 3) Goal difference; 4) Goals scored; 5) Head-to-head points; 6) Head-to-head goal difference; 7) Fair play ranking; 8) Drawing of lots.

==== Results summary ====
Overall								Home						Away					
Pld	W	D	L	GF	GA	GD	Pts	W	D	L	GF	GA	GD	W	D	L	GF	GA	GD
33	14	11	8	49	37	+12	53	8	3	6	25	20	+5	6	8	2	24	17	+7

Source: Hungarian Football Federation

==== Results by round ====
Round	1	2	3	4	5	6	7	8	9	10	11	12	13	14	15	16	17	18	19	20	21	22	23	24	25	26	27	28	29	30	31	32	33
Ground	A	H	H	A	H	A	H	A	H	A	H	H	A	A	H	A	H	A	H	A	H	A	A	H	H	A	H	A	H	A	H	A	H
Result	L	L	L	L	L	D	W	D	W	W	D	D	D	D	L	W	L	D	W	W	W	D	W	D	W	D	W	W	W	W	W	D	L
Position	10	12	12	12	12	12	12	12	11	7	7	8	9	9	9	9	9	8	8	7	7	6	6	6	5	5	5	4	4	4	4	4	4
Points	0	0	0	0	0	1	4	5	8	11	12	13	14	15	15	18	18	19	22	25	28	29	32	33	36	37	40	43	46	49	52	53	53

Source: Matches
A = Away; H = Home; W = Win; D = Draw; L = Loss

==== Matches ====
26 July 2024 1	Nyíregyháza	2–1	Győr	Mezőkövesd (Note: Nyíregyháza played the first home game at the Városi Stadion in Mezőkövesd, due to the team's inability to occupy the newly built stadium in Nyíregyháza.)
20:15 CEST (UTC+2)	Kovácsréti 29', (yellow card) 90+5'; Beke 55'; Jokić (yellow card) 85'	Report	Gavrić (yellow card) 58'; Bitri (yellow card) 70'; Borbély (manager) (yellow card) 75'; Krivokapić 78', (yellow card) 90+5'; Csontos (yellow card) 83'	Stadium: Városi Stadion; Attendance: 1,600; Referee: József Erdős; Assistant referees: Balázs Szalai, Dávid Rózsa; Fourth official: Dr. Bence Csonka

2 August 2024 2	Győr	0–3	Debrecen	Győr
18:50 CEST (UTC+2)		Report	Lagator (yellow card) 47'; Domingues 55'; Bárány 60'; Silue 85'	Stadium: ETO Park; Attendance: 5,138; Referee: Tamás Bognár; Assistant referees: Dániel Szalai, Dávid Rózsa; Fourth official: Ádám Pillók

11 August 2024 3	Győr	1–2	MTK	Győr
15:45 CEST (UTC+2)	Lukić 2'; Vera (yellow card) 53'; Boldor (yellow card) 90+3'; Borbély (manager) (yellow card) 90+9'	Report	I. Bognár 38' (pen.), 54' (pen.); P. Kovács I (yellow card) 45'; Varju (yellow card) 84'; Demjén (yellow card) 90+4'	Stadium: ETO Park; Attendance: 3,420; Referee: Márton Rúsz; Assistant referees: Balázs Szalai, Gergely Becséri; Fourth official: Ferenc Karakó

16 August 2024 4	Kecskemét	2–1	Győr	Kecskemét
20:00 CEST (UTC+2)	Nikitscher 9', 45+3'; B. Kovács (yellow card) 29'; Vágó (yellow card) 44'; Meskhi (yellow card) 58'; Kersák (yellow card) 82'	Report	Gavrić (yellow card) 4'; Csontos (yellow card) 22'; Diarra 90'; Boldor (yellow card) 90+5'	Stadium: Széktói Stadion; Attendance: 2,702; Referee: Marcell Derdák; Assistant referees: István Szécsényi, Péter Ország; Fourth official: Ádám Pillók

31 August 2024 6	Diósgyőr	0–0	Győr	Miskolc
20:00 CEST (UTC+2)	Saničanin (yellow card) 5'; Edomwonyi (yellow card) 58'; Acolatse (red card) 90+6'	Report	R. Tóth (yellow card) 47'; Gavrić (yellow card) 87'; Petráš (red card) 90+6'	Stadium: Diósgyőri Stadion; Attendance: 5,503; Referee: Gergő Bogár; Assistant referees: István Albert, Bence Péter Belicza; Fourth official: Ádám Pillók

22 September 2024 7	Győr	2–1	Paks	Győr
19:00 CEST (UTC+2)	Benbouali 9', 27'; Gavrić (yellow card) 13'; Diarra (yellow card) 82'; Gyurákovics (yellow card) 90+1'	Report	Ötvös 30'; Windecker (yellow card) 53'; Kinyik (yellow card) 77'	Stadium: ETO Park; Attendance: 3,158; Referee: Márton Rúsz; Assistant referees: Balázs Szalai, Róbert Horváth; Fourth official: Imre Kovács

27 September 2024 8	Újpest	0–0	Győr	Budapest
20:00 CEST (UTC+2)	Fiola (yellow card) 64'; Brodić (yellow card) 72'; Helmich (yellow card) 72'	Report	Heitor (yellow card) 12'; Bitri (yellow card) 19'; Ouro (yellow card) 58'; Gyurákovics (yellow card) 90+7'	Stadium: Szusza Ferenc Stadion; Attendance: 7,120; Referee: Dr. Bence Csonka; Assistant referees: Georgiou Theodoros, Péter Ország; Fourth official: Mihály Káprály

5 October 2024 9	Győr	3–1	Fehérvár	Győr
14:30 CEST (UTC+2)	Štefulj 9'; Gavrić 14'; Boldor 90+3'	Report	B. Szabó 25' (pen.); M. Pető (yellow card) 28'; P. Kovács II (yellow card) 90+3'	Stadium: ETO Park; Attendance: 4,138; Referee: Csaba Pintér; Assistant referees: Vencel Tóth II, Dániel Szalai; Fourth official: Péter Zierkelbach

20 October 2024 10	Zalaegerszeg	1–2	Győr	Zalaegerszeg
15:15 CEST (UTC+2)	Croizet 25'; Csóka (yellow card) 85'	Report	Bitri (yellow card) 39', (goal) 72'; Marku (yellow card) 50'; Bumba 82'; Štefulj (yellow card) 90+4'	Stadium: ZTE Arena; Attendance: 3,017; Referee: Imre Kovács; Assistant referees: Balázs Huszár, Péter Ország; Fourth official: Tamás Bognár

27 October 2024 11	Győr	1–1	Ferencváros	Győr
17:45 CET (UTC+1)	Ouro 45'; Marku (yellow card) 74'	Report	Traoré 66'; Kady (yellow card) 77'	Stadium: ETO Park; Attendance: 7,765; Referee: József Erdős; Assistant referees: Vencel Tóth II, József Aradi; Fourth official: Péter Zierkelbach

2 November 2024 12	Győr	1–1	Nyíregyháza	Győr
19:00 CET (UTC+1)	Bitri (yellow card) 28', (goal) 38'; Benbouali (yellow card) 61'; Marku (yellow card) 86'	Report	Toma (yellow card) 18'; Kvekveskiri 64'	Stadium: ETO Park; Attendance: 3,347; Referee: Imre Kovács; Assistant referees: Balázs Szert, Dániel Szalai; Fourth official: Ádám Pillók

9 November 2024 13	Debrecen	2–2	Győr	Debrecen
16:00 CET (UTC+1)	Dzsudzsák (yellow card) 8'; Bárány 42'; Stojković 73'	Report	Bumba 9'; Boldor (yellow card) 40'; R. Tóth (yellow card) 59'; Heitor (yellow card) 62'; Marku (yellow card) 67'; Ouro (yellow card) 70'; Bitri 89'	Stadium: Nagyerdei Stadion; Attendance: 4,521; Referee: Ferenc Karakó; Assistant referees: Vencel Tóth II, Norbert Bornemissza; Fourth official: Balázs Berke

23 November 2024 14	MTK	2–2	Győr	Budapest
16:00 CET (UTC+1)	Kata (yellow card) 23'; Jurina 27'; R. Molnár (yellow card) 60'; Varju (yellow card) 66', (goal) 73'; I. Bognár (yellow card) 90+3'	Report	Bitri 63'; Bumba 68'; Ouro (yellow card) 81'	Stadium: Hidegkuti Nándor Stadion; Attendance: 2,500; Referee: Marcell Derdák; Assistant referees: Georgiou Theodoros, Bence Péter Belicza; Fourth official: József Erdős

30 November 2024 15	Győr	1–2	Kecskemét	Győr
14:30 CET (UTC+1)	Szépe (yellow card) 7'; Sahli 50'	Report	B. Kovács 30'; A. Szabó (yellow card) 66'; Lukács 75'; Kersák (yellow card) 76'; Z. Gera (manager) (yellow card) 87'; Nikitscher (yellow card) 90+8'	Stadium: ETO Park; Attendance: 2,342; Referee: Márton Rúsz; Assistant referees: Balázs Buzás, Péter Ország; Fourth official: Gergő Bogár

4 December 2024 5	Győr	0–2	Puskás Akadémia	Győr
19:00 CET (UTC+1)	Ouro (yellow card) 56'; Bitri (yellow card) 57'; Heitor (yellow card) 68'; Škvarka (on the bench) (yellow card) 68'; Anton (yellow card) 83'	Report	Zsol. Nagy 11'; Golla (yellow card) 59', (goal) 64'	Stadium: ETO Park; Attendance: 1,562; Referee: Péter Antal; Assistant referees: Róbert Horváth, Ákos Berényi; Fourth official: Ádám Pillók

7 December 2024 16	Puskás Akadémia	0–3	Győr	Felcsút
16:45 CET (UTC+1)	Zsol. Nagy (yellow card) 63'; Golla (red card) 72'	Report	Benbouali 35'; Bumba 48', 68'	Stadium: Pancho Aréna; Attendance: 1,036; Referee: Péter Zierkelbach; Assistant referees: Gergő Vígh-Tarsonyi, Anita Vad; Fourth official: Sándor Andó-Szabó

14 December 2024 17	Győr	3–4	Diósgyőr	Győr
17:00 CET (UTC+1)	Sahli 59'; D. Gera 79' (o.g.); Štefulj 83'	Report	Bárdos 24', 44'; Edomwonyi 32'; Klimovich 51'; Chorbadzhiyski (yellow card) 86'; Franchu (yellow card) 90'; Bényei (yellow card) 90+5'	Stadium: ETO Park; Attendance: 2,148; Referee: István Vad; Assistant referees: Balázs Huszár, Péter Ország; Fourth official: Imre Kovács

1 February 2025 18	Paks	1–1	Győr	Paks
14:30 CET (UTC+1)	Vécsei (yellow card) 18'; Kinyik (yellow card) 51'; Ötvös 77'; Balogh (yellow card) 90+1'	Report	Štefulj (yellow card) 26'; Ouro (yellow card) 71'; Benbouali 79'; Anton (yellow card) 90+4'	Stadium: Fehérvári úti Stadion; Attendance: 2,510; Referee: József Erdős; Assistant referees: Balázs Buzás, Bence Péter Belicza; Fourth official: Péter Antal

8 February 2025 19	Győr	3–0	Újpest	Győr
19:30 CET (UTC+1)	Gavrić 8'; Benbouali 41'; Vitális (yellow card) 68'; Bumba 76'	Report		Stadium: ETO Park; Attendance: 4,380; Referee: Péter Antal; Assistant referees: Norbert Bornemissza, Péter Ország; Fourth official: Ferenc Karakó

14 February 2025 20	Fehérvár	0–1	Győr	Székesfehérvár
20:00 CET (UTC+1)	Huszti (yellow card) 16'; Holender (yellow card) 48'; Melnyk (yellow card) 49'	Report	Ouro (yellow card) 49'; Štefulj 72'	Stadium: Sóstói Stadion; Attendance: 2,583; Referee: Imre Kovács; Assistant referees: Gergő Vígh-Tarsonyi, István Szécsényi; Fourth official: Ádám Pilók

23 February 2025 21	Győr	2–0	Zalaegerszeg	Győr
15:30 CET (UTC+1)	Várkonyi 41' (o.g.); Štefulj (yellow card) 46'; Ouro (yellow card) 80'; Benbouali 82'; Anton (yellow card) 82'	Report	Medgyes (red card) 44'	Stadium: ETO Park; Attendance: 2,670; Referee: Ferenc Karakó; Assistant referees: István Albert, Bence Péter Belicza; Fourth official: József Erdős

2 March 2025 22	Ferencváros	2–2	Győr	Budapest
18:00 CET (UTC+1)	Pešić 79', (yellow card) 83'; Saldanha 84'	Report	Marku 11', (yellow card) 44'; Gavrić (yellow card) 40'; Benbouali 48' (pen.); R. Tóth (yellow card) 67'; Petráš (yellow card) 90+7'	Stadium: Groupama Arena; Attendance: 8,773; Referee: Gergő Bogár; Assistant referees: Péter Kóbor, Péter Garai; Fourth official: Imre Kovács

8 March 2025 23	Nyíregyháza	0–1	Győr	Nyíregyháza
14:30 CET (UTC+1)		Report	Szépe 64'	Stadium: Városi Stadion; Attendance: 4,539; Referee: Marcell Derdák; Assistant referees: Balázs Buzás, Péter Ország; Fourth official: Márton Rúsz

14 March 2025 24	Győr	0–0	Debrecen	Győr
18:00 CET (UTC+1)	Anton (yellow card) 20'; R. Tóth (yellow card) 29'; Štefulj (yellow card) 44'; Marku (yellow card) 45'; Krpić (yellow card) 78'; Ouro (yellow card) 90'	Report	Malinov (yellow card) 18'; Dzsudzsák (yellow card) 66'; Youga (yellow card) 86'	Stadium: ETO Park; Attendance: 2,890; Referee: Márton Rúsz; Assistant referees: Gergő Vígh-Tarsonyi, Ákos Berényi; Fourth official: Tamás Bognár

29 March 2025 25	Győr	2–1	MTK	Győr
14:30 CET (UTC+1)	Gavrić (yellow card) 28'; Anton 32' (pen.); Bumba 78'	Report	Kata (yellow card) 36'; Kádár (yellow card) 56'; Németh 73'; Beriashvili (yellow card) 88'	Stadium: ETO Park; Attendance: 2,130; Referee: Attila Molnár; Assistant referees: Péter Kóbor, Norbert Bornemissza; Fourth official: Mihály Káprály

5 April 2025 26	Kecskemét	1–1	Győr	Kecskemét
14:30 CEST (UTC+2)	Zeke (yellow card) 28'; Lukács 88'	Report	Bánáti (yellow card) 5'; Benbouali (yellow card) 72'; Bitri 90+6'	Stadium: Széktói Stadion; Attendance: 2,241; Referee: Péter Zierkelbach; Assistant referees: Gergely Becséri, Péter Ország; Fourth official: Marcell Derdák

12 April 2025 27	Győr	2–0	Puskás Akadémia	Győr
14:15 CEST (UTC+2)	Bumba (yellow card) 43'; Bánáti (yellow card) 70'; Štefulj (yellow card) 72'; Diarra 86'; Sahli 90+8' (pen.)	Report	Colley (yellow card) 40'; Favorov (yellow card) 56'	Stadium: ETO Park; Attendance: 3,120; Referee: Imre Kovács; Assistant referees: Georgiou Theodoros, József Aradi; Fourth official: Attila Molnár

19 April 2025 28	Diósgyőr	2–4	Győr	Miskolc
16:15 CEST (UTC+2)	D. Gera 30'; Edomwonyi 67'	Report	Bánáti 8'; Bumba 19'; Vitális 40'; Ouro 86'	Stadium: Diósgyőri Stadion; Attendance: 6,198; Referee: Csaba Pintér; Assistant referees: Gergő Vígh-Tarsonyi, Dávid Rózsa; Fourth official: Attila Molnár

26 April 2025 29	Győr	2–0	Paks	Győr
17:30 CEST (UTC+2)	Ouro 66'; Štefulj 87'	Report	Windecker (yellow card) 64'	Stadium: ETO Park; Attendance: 4,120; Referee: Márton Rúsz; Assistant referees: Georgiou Theodoros, Dávid Rózsa; Fourth official: Eszter Urbán

3 May 2025 30	Újpest	2–3	Győr	Budapest
13:00 CEST (UTC+2)	Ljujić 77' (pen.), 90+3'	Report	Vitális (yellow card) 50'; Ouro 52'; Bumba 71'; Szépe 84'	Stadium: Szusza Ferenc Stadion; Attendance: 4,952; Referee: Péter Antal; Assistant referees: Norbert Bornemissza, Dávid Rózsa; Fourth official: Mihály Káprály

9 May 2025 31	Győr	1–0	Fehérvár	Győr
20:00 CEST (UTC+2)	Krpić 51', (yellow card) 58'; Borbély (manager) (yellow card) 81'; Njie (yellow card) 90+5'	Report	M. Kovács (yellow card) 23'; Kalandadze (yellow card) 55'; B. Szabó (yellow card) 66'; Bedi (yellow card) 80'; Tímár (manager) (yellow card) 81'	Stadium: ETO Park; Attendance: 6,689; Referee: Márton Rúsz; Assistant referees: Norbert Bornemissza, Péter Garai; Fourth official: Attila Molnár

17 May 2025 32	Zalaegerszeg	0–0	Győr	Zalaegerszeg
13:45 CEST (UTC+2)		Report	Vitális (yellow card) 68'; Benbouali (yellow card) 69'	Stadium: ZTE Arena; Attendance: 3,449; Referee: Péter Antal; Assistant referees: Balázs Huszár, Gergely Becséri; Fourth official: Imre Kovács

24 May 2025 33	Győr	1–2	Ferencváros	Győr
20:00 CEST (UTC+2)	Krpić (yellow card) 31', (goal) 80'; Vitális (yellow card) 59'; Njie (yellow card) 88'	Report	Szalai 45+1'; Joseph 54'; A. Tóth (yellow card) 88'	Stadium: ETO Park; Attendance: 7,999; Referee: Balázs Berke; Assistant referees: Balázs Buzás, Péter Kóbor; Fourth official: Péter Zierkelbach

=== Magyar Kupa ===
14 September 2024 Round of 64	Putnok	2–6	Győr	Putnok
15:00 CEST (UTC+2)	Lőrincz (yellow card) 50', (goal) 65', 73'; Mrva (yellow card) 60'; Máris (yellow card) 64'	Report	Sahli 14'; Štefulj 52', 90', (yellow card) 72'; Benbouali 53'; Gavrić 75'; Marku (yellow card) 80'; Krivokapić 83'	Stadium: Várady Béla Sportközpont; Attendance: 500; Referee: Tamás Berényi; Assistant referees: Gábor Kovács, Viktor Nagy

30 October 2024 Round of 32	Mosonmagyaróvár	0–3	Győr	Mosonmagyaróvár
12:30 CET (UTC+1)	Illés (yellow card) 70'; Weitner (manager) (yellow card) 70'; Sipos (yellow card) 86'	Report	Krpić (yellow card) 60'; Sahli 67'; Bumba 80'; Škvarka 88'	Stadium: Wittmann Antal park Attendance: 800; Referee: J. Zoltán Kovács; Assistant referees: Dániel Szalai, Kevin Ring

27 February 2025 Round of 16	Győr	3–4 (a.e.t.)	Ferencváros	Győr
20:00 CET (UTC+1)	Gavrić 11'; Vitális 52'; Romão 54' (o.g.); Bitri (yellow card) 63'; Krpić (yellow card) 70'; Benbouali (yellow card) 78'; Sahli (yellow card) 93'; Anton (yellow card) 107'	Report	Ben Romdhane 33'; B. Varga 34' (pen.), 50'; Romão (yellow card) 90'; A. Tóth (yellow card) 110'; Zachariassen 117'	Stadium: ETO Park; Attendance: 1,800; Referee: Dr. Bence Csonka; Assistant referees: Vencel Tóth II, Norbert Bornemissza; Fourth official: Marcell Derdák

== Statistics ==
=== Overall ===
Appearances (Apps) numbers are for appearances in competitive games only, including sub appearances.
Source: Competitions

No.	Player	Pos.	Nemzeti Bajnokság I				Magyar Kupa				Total			
No.	Player	Pos.	Apps	Goal	Yellow card	Red card	Apps	Goal	Yellow card	Red card	Apps	Goal	Yellow card	Red card
3	(Brazil) Heitor	DF	26		3		1				27		3	
4	(Argentina) Luciano Vera	DF	7		1		1				8		1	
5	(Romania) Paul Anton	MF	24	1	4		3		1		27	1	5	
6	(Hungary) Rajmund Tóth	MF	25		4		1				26		4	
7	(Mali) Mamady Diarra	FW	20	2	1		1				21	2	1	
8	(Albania) Ledio Beqja	DF	4				1				5			
9	(Montenegro) Matija Krivokapić	FW	13	1	1		2	1			15	2	1	
10	(Romania) Claudiu Bumba	MF	28	9	1		2	1			30	10	1	
11	(The Gambia) Nfansu Njie	FW	14		2		1				15		2	
12	(Hungary) Barnabás Ruisz	GK	1								1			
13	(Portugal) Fábio Vianna	DF	9				1				10			
14	(Algeria) Ahmed Nadhir Benbouali	FW	24	7	3		2	1	1		26	8	4	
16	(Hungary) László Vingler	MF	3				1				4			
18	(Hungary) Dominik Csontos	DF	4		2						4		2	
19	(Slovakia) János Szépe	DF	24	2	1		2				26	2	1	
20	(Hungary) Barnabás Bíró	DF	8								8			
22	(Albania) Albion Marku	DF	20	1	6		2		1		22	1	7	
23	(Croatia) Daniel Štefulj	DF	27	4	5		3	2	1		30	6	6	
24	(Hungary) Miljan Krpić	MF	19	2	3		2		2		21	2	5	
25	(Romania) Deian Boldor	DF	11	1	3		2				13	1	3	
26	(Hungary) Erik Gyurákovics	GK	9		2						9		2	
27	(Serbia) Nenad Lukić	FW	4	1							4	1		
27	(Hungary) Milán Vitális	MF	13	1	4		1	1			14	2	4	
30	(Croatia) Dino Grozdanić	DF												
33	(Albania) Eneo Bitri	DF	22	5	5		2		1		24	5	6	
39	(Hungary) Marcell Herczeg	MF	1								1			
40	(Cameroon) Luc William Ntsama	FW	1								1			
42	(Hungary) Dávid Koncz	DF												
44	(Togo) Samsondin Ouro	MF	25	4	8		3				28	4	8	
47	(Hungary) Ádám Décsy	MF	5								5			
55	(Austria) Christopher Kröhn	FW	1				1				2			
57	(Czech Republic) Filip Kaša	DF	2								2			
77	(Tunisia) Wajdi Sahli	MF	23	3			3	2	1		26	5	1	
80	(Serbia) Željko Gavrić	FW	29	2	6		3	2			32	4	6	
90	(Hungary) Kevin Bánáti	MF	19	1	2		2				21	1	2	
92	(Slovakia) Michal Škvarka	MF	7		1		2	1			9	1	1	
97	(Hungary) Balázs Farkas	FW	4								4			
99	(Slovakia) Samuel Petráš	GK	23		1	1	3				26		1	1
Own goals				2				1				3		
Totals				49	69	1		12	8			61	77	1

=== Clean sheets ===
			Clean sheets		
No.	Player	Games Played	Nemzeti Bajnokság I	Magyar Kupa	Total
99	(Slovakia) Samuel Petráš	26	10	1	11
26	(Hungary) Erik Gyurákovics	9	2		2
12	(Hungary) Barnabás Ruisz	1			
Totals			12	1	13
