= 2023–24 NK Lokomotiva Zagreb season =

NK Lokomotiva Zagreb
2023–24 season
- Stadium: Stadion Kranjčevićeva
- Croatian Football League: 5th
- Croatian Football Cup: Semi-finals
- Top goalscorer: League: Duje Čop (12); All: Duje Čop (12)
- Biggest win: Istra 1961 0–4 Lokomotiva
Home colours

The 2023–24 NK Lokomotiva Zagreb season was the club's 110th season in existence and its 15th consecutive season in the top flight of Croatian football. In addition to the domestic league, NK Lokomotiva Zagreb participated in this season's edition of the Croatian Football Cup. The season covers the period from 1 July 2023 to 30 June 2024.

== Players ==
=== First-team squad ===
As of 1 December 2023

Note: Flags indicate national team as defined under FIFA eligibility rules; some limited exceptions apply. Players may hold more than one non-FIFA nationality.

No.	Pos.	Nation	Player
1	GK	CRO	Nikola Čavlina
2	DF	CRO	Moreno Živković (on loan from Dinamo Zagreb)
4	DF	CRO	Marin Leovac
5	DF	ALB	Jon Mersinaj
6	DF	BIH	Ilija Mašić
7	MF	CRO	Silvio Goričan
8	MF	CRO	Robert Mudražija
9	FW	CRO	Duje Čop
10	FW	ALB	Indrit Tuci
12	GK	CRO	Krunoslav Hendija
14	MF	BIH	Mateo Marić
15	DF	KOS	Art Smakaj
17	DF	BIH	Ivan Milićević
19	FW	CRO	Marin Šotiček

No.	Pos.	Nation	Player
20	DF	CRO	Branimir Kalaica
21	FW	CRO	Viktor Kanižaj
22	DF	CRO	Karlo Bartolec
23	MF	MKD	Feta Fetai
24	MF	BIH	Anes Krdžalić (on loan from Dinamo Zagreb)
25	FW	MNE	Ivan Bulatović
27	DF	CRO	Marko Vranjković
28	FW	CRO	Ivan Canjuga
29	MF	MNE	Vladan Bubanja
31	GK	CRO	Zvonimir Šubarić
—	DF	CRO	Viktor Damjanić
—	MF	CRO	Marko Hanuljak
—	FW	CRO	Antonio Baždarić

=== Dual registration ===
Note: Flags indicate national team as defined under FIFA eligibility rules; some limited exceptions apply. Players may hold more than one non-FIFA nationality.

No.	Pos.	Nation	Player
3	DF	CRO	Matej Matić (at Jarun)
13	MF	BIH	Blaž Bošković (at Jarun)

No.	Pos.	Nation	Player
16	MF	CRO	Fabijan Krivak (at Jarun)
26	DF	CRO	Fran Žilinski (at Jarun)

=== Out on loan ===
Note: Flags indicate national team as defined under FIFA eligibility rules; some limited exceptions apply. Players may hold more than one non-FIFA nationality.

No.	Pos.	Nation	Player
11	MF	CRO	Lukas Kačavenda (at Dinamo Zagreb until 18 January 2024)
21	MF	CRO	Gabriel Groznica (at Koper until 30 June 2024)
—	DF	CRO	Vinko Bičanić (at Jarun until 14 June 2024)

No.	Pos.	Nation	Player
—	MF	CRO	Luka Išlić (at Kustošija until 14 June 2024)
—	FW	ALB	Klevis Dragaj (at Liria Prizren until 18 January 2024)

== Transfers ==
=== In ===
Pos.	Player	Transferred from	Fee	Date	Source
DF	(Bosnia and Herzegovina) Ilija Mašić	(Bosnia and Herzegovina) Široki Brijeg	Free	1 July 2023	
MF	(Croatia) Robert Mudražija	(Croatia) Slaven Belupo	Undisclosed	3 July 2023	
MF	(Bosnia and Herzegovina) Anes Krdžalić	(Croatia) Dinamo Zagreb	Loan	29 August 2023	
DF	(Croatia) Karlo Bartolec	(Hungary) Puskás Akadémia	Free	31 August 2023	

=== Out ===
Pos.	Player	Transferred to	Fee	Date	Source
DF	(Netherlands) Justin de Haas	(Portugal) Famalicão	Undisclosed	3 July 2023	
MF	(Croatia) Lukas Kačavenda	(Croatia) Dinamo Zagreb	Loan	25 August 2023	
FW	(Montenegro) Ivan Bulatović	(Uzbekistan) Lokomotiv Tashkent	Free	6 January 2024	
MF	(Bosnia and Herzegovina) Eldar Mehmedović	(Bosnia and Herzegovina) FK Sarajevo	Free	15 January 2024	
MF	(Croatia) Marko Hanuljak	(Bosnia and Herzegovina) HŠK Posušje	Undisclosed	15 January 2024	

== Pre-season and friendlies ==
Win Draw Loss Fixtures

7 July 2023 Friendly	Anderlecht (Belgium)	3–1	(Croatia) Lokomotiva	Brussels
13:00 CEST (UTC+2)				Stadium: Complexe Sportif Neerpede – Terrein 6

8 July 2023 Friendly	Lokomotiva (Croatia)	2–1	(Belgium) Gent
14:00 CEST (UTC+2)

12 July 2023 Friendly	Charleroi (Belgium)	2–1	(Croatia) Lokomotiva	Burgh-Haamstede, Netherlands
18:30 CEST (UTC+2)	Marcq 75'; Štulić 90'		Marić 65'

24 July 2023 Friendly	Al-Ettifaq (Saudi Arabia)	0–1	(Croatia) Lokomotiva
18:00 CEST (UTC+2)

8 September 2023 Friendly	Lokomotiva (Croatia)	1–0	(Croatia) Radomlje
17:00 CEST (UTC+2)

16 January 2024 Friendly	Slaven Belupo (Croatia)	0–0	(Croatia) Lokomotiva
14:30 CET (UTC+1)

== Competitions ==
=== Overview ===
Competition	First match	Last match	Starting round	Record							
Competition	First match	Last match	Starting round	Pld	W	D	L	GF	GA	GD	Win %
Croatian Football League	23 July 2023		Matchday 1	17	3	9	5	19	19	+0	17.65
Croatian Football Cup	27 September 2023		Round of 32	2	2	0	0	3	1	+2	100.00
Total				19	5	9	5	22	20	+2	26.32

Last updated: 8 December 2023
Source: Soccerway

=== Croatian Football League ===
==== League table ====
Pos	Team	Pld	W	D	L	GF	GA	GD	Pts	Qualification or relegation
3	Hajduk Split	36	21	5	10	54	26	+28	68	Qualification to Conference League second qualifying round
4	Osijek	36	16	9	11	62	43	+19	57	Qualification to Conference League second qualifying round
5	Lokomotiva	36	12	15	9	52	45	+7	51	
6	Varaždin	36	10	12	14	39	47	−8	42	
7	Gorica	36	11	8	17	35	50	−15	41	

Source: SuperSport HNL
Rules for classification: 1) Points; 2) Head-to-head points; 3) Head-to-head goal difference; 4) Head-to-head goals scored (at home if two teams tied); 5) Goal difference; 6) Goals scored; 7) Play-off
(Note: Criteria 2-4 and 7 is only used if deciding champion, teams to international competition or teams for relegation and in that case criteria 6 will not be used).

==== Results summary ====
Overall								Home						Away					
Pld	W	D	L	GF	GA	GD	Pts	W	D	L	GF	GA	GD	W	D	L	GF	GA	GD
17	3	9	5	19	19	0	18	1	6	1	11	12	−1	2	3	4	8	7	+1

Last updated: 8 December 2023.

==== Results by round ====
Round	1
Ground	
Result	
Position	

Updated to match(es) played on 8 December 2023. Source:
A = Away; H = Home; W = Win; D = Draw; L = Loss

==== Matches ====
The league fixtures were unveiled on 12 June 2023.

16 December 2023	Lokomotiva Zagreb	3–0	Istra 1961	Zagreb
14:50				Stadium: Stadion Kranjčevićeva

23 January 2024	Dinamo Zagreb	0–3	Lokomotiva Zagreb	Zagreb
17:00				Stadium: Stadion Maksimir

28 January 2024	Gorica	1–2	Lokomotiva Zagreb	Velika Gorica
15:00				Stadium: Stadion Radnik

2 February 2024	Lokomotiva Zagreb	0–0	Varaždin	Zagreb
17:00				Stadium: Stadion Kranjčevićeva

10 February 2024	Lokomotiva Zagreb	2–2	Dinamo Zagreb	Zagreb
17:10				Stadium: Stadion Kranjčevićeva

17 February 2024	Rijeka	4–0	Lokomotiva Zagreb	Rijeka
15:00				Stadium: Stadion Rujevica

23 February 2024	Lokomotiva Zagreb	1–1	Osijek	Zagreb
17:00	Smakaj 31'		Mierez 90+4' (pn.)	Stadium: Stadion Kranjčevićeva

=== Croatian Football Cup ===
27 September 2023 Round of 32	NK Dugo Selo	0–1	Lokomotiva Zagreb	Dugo Selo
15:30		Report		Stadium: Gradski stadion Referee: Patrik Pavlešić

29 November 2023 Round of 16	Vukovar 1991	1–2	Lokomotiva Zagreb	Vukovar
13:30		Report		Stadium: Stadion u Borovom Naselju; Referee: Ante Terzić

28 February 2024 Quarter-finals	Lokomotiva Zagreb	v	Osijek	Zagreb
15:00				Stadium: Stadion Kranjčevićeva
