= Roko Šimić =

Croatian footballer

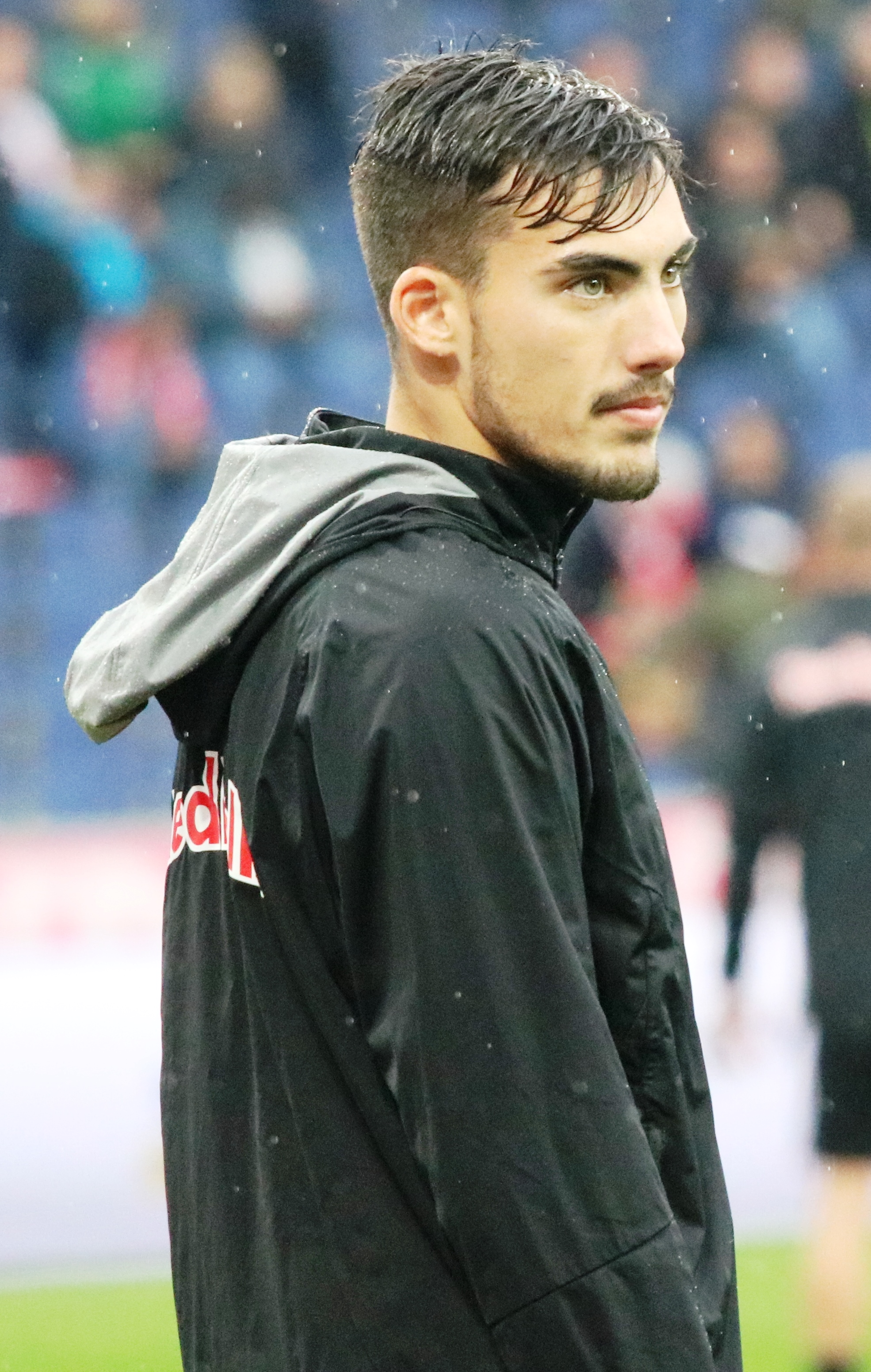
- Šimić with Red Bull Salzburg in 2022

Personal information
- Date of birth: 10 September 2003 (age 23)
- Place of birth: Milan, Italy
- Height: 1.90 m (6 ft 3 in)
- Position: Forward

Team information
- Current team: 1. FC Magdeburg; (on loan from Cardiff City)
- Number: 9

Youth career
- –2011: Dinamo Zagreb
- 2011–2015: Kustošija
- 2015–2020: Lokomotiva Zagreb

Senior career*
Years	Team	Apps	(Gls)
2020–2021	Lokomotiva Zagreb	25	(3)
2021–2024	Red Bull Salzburg	38	(5)
2021–2022	→ FC Liefering (loan)	24	(19)
2023	→ Zürich (loan)	16	(4)
2024–	Cardiff City	0	(0)
2024–2025	→ KV Kortrijk (loan)	4	(0)
2025–2026	→ Karlsruher SC (loan)	26	(3)
2026–	→ 1. FC Magdeburg (loan)	7	(1)

International career^{‡}
2017	Croatia U15	1	(0)
2018–2019	Croatia U16	13	(3)
2019–2020	Croatia U17	9	(1)
2021–2024	Croatia U21	20	(8)
- * Club domestic league appearances and goals as of 7 November 2026 (UTC) ‡ National team caps and goals as of 17 October 2023

Roko Šimić (born 10 September 2003) is a Croatian professional footballer who plays as a forward for 2. Bundesliga club 1. FC Magdeburg, on loan from EFL Championship club Cardiff City.

== Career ==
=== Lokomotiva Zagreb ===
Šimić made his senior debut for Lokomotiva Zagreb on 16 August 2020 in a 6–0 league defeat to Dinamo Zagreb, getting substituted on for Indrit Tuci in the 66th minute. He was given an opportunity by coach Goran Tomić due to the club's lack of squad depth. During the season, which was marked by Lokomotiva's struggle to preserve the first league status, Šimić made 26 appearances and scored four goals. He scored his debut goal for Lokomotiva on 7 October 2020, in a 3–2 victory over Gaj Mače in the Croatian Cup. His debut league goals came on 21 April 2021 when he scored a brace in the 4–0 victory over Varaždin.

=== Red Bull Salzburg ===
The first rumours that Red Bull Salzburg was following Šimić appeared in April 2021 in Kleine Zeitung. Šimić signed a three-year deal with the Austrian club on 18 July 2021. With income of €4 million, it is Lokomotiva's most expensive transfer surpassing that of Ivo Grbić to Atlético Madrid. Despite the initial plan to leave the player at Lokomotiva on loan for half a season, he moved to Austria immediately and joined Salzburg's feeder club FC Liefering.

He made his debut for Liefering on 30 July 2021, getting substituted on for Dijon Kameri in the 46th minute, and scored his debut goal within a minute in a 2–1 victory over St. Pölten. On 10 October, he extended his contract with Salzburg until 2025, after impressing the club executives by scoring six goals in nine league appearances and two goals in two Youth League appearances. On 20 October 2021, he made his senior team and Champions League debut, replacing Noah Okafor in the 87th minute of the 3–1 victory over VfL Wolfsburg. Four days later, he made his league debut for the senior team, replacing Karim Adeyemi in the 87th minute of the 4–1 victory over Sturm Graz. During Salzburg's path to the Youth League Final, Šimić contributed seven goals and three assists, making him the joint-top goalscorer of the competition together with Mads Hansen and Aral Şimşir. On 5 January 2023, Šimić joined reigning Swiss Super League champions Zürich on loan until the end of the 2022–23 season. He scored two goals on his debut on 21 January 2023 against FC Luzern, after entering the game only in the 77th minute. On 20 September 2023, he scored his first Champions League goal by netting a penalty in a 2–0 away win over Benfica.

=== Cardiff City ===
On 30 August 2024, Šimić signed a four-year contract with Cardiff City. Two days later, he was loaned to KV Kortrijk in Belgium for one season. The loan was terminated on 6 January 2025.

On 28 June 2025, Šimić moved on a new loan to Karlsruher SC in German 2. Bundesliga, with an option to buy.

== Personal life ==
He is the son of former footballer Dario Šimić and his wife Jelena Medić, and was born in Milan during his father's stint with AC Milan. He has three brothers – Viktor, Nikolas and David. He is also a nephew of Josip Šimić. Roko Šimić is also confirmation sponsor of Lukas Kačavenda, and a distant relative of Herzegovinian hajduk Andrijica Šimić,

== Career statistics ==
=== Club ===
As of match played 4 October 2025

Appearances and goals by club, season and competition
Club	Season	League			National cup (Note: Includes Croatian Cup and Austrian Cup)		Continental		Other		Total	
Club	Season	Division	Apps	Goals	Apps	Goals	Apps	Goals	Apps	Goals	Apps	Goals
Lokomotiva Zagreb	2020–21	Prva HNL	25	3	1	1	0	0	—		26	4
Red Bull Salzburg	2021–22	Austrian Bundesliga	1	0	1	0	1 (Note: Appearance(s) in UEFA Champions League)	0	—		3	0
Red Bull Salzburg	2022–23	Austrian Bundesliga	9	0	2	1	2	0	—		13	1
Red Bull Salzburg	2023–24	Austrian Bundesliga	28	5	3	0	6	1	—		37	6
Red Bull Salzburg	Total		38	5	6	1	9	1	—		53	7
FC Liefering (loan)	2021–22	2. Liga	24	19	0	0	—		—		24	19
Zürich (loan)	2022–23	Swiss Super League	16	4	0	0	—		—		16	4
Cardiff City	2024–25	EFL Championship	0	0	0	0	—		0	0	0	0
Kortrijk (loan)	2024–25	Belgian Pro League	4	0	0	0	—		0	0	4	0
Karlsruher SC (loan)	2025–26	2. Bundesliga	8	1	1	0	—		—		9	1
Career total			115	32	8	2	9	1	0	0	132	35

== Honours ==
Red Bull Salzburg

- Austrian Bundesliga: 2021–22, 2022–23

Individual

- UEFA Youth League top scorer: 2021–22
