= 2020–21 NK Lokomotiva season =

NK Lokomotiva
2020–21 season
- Chairman: Tin Dolički
- Manager: Goran Tomić
- Stadium: Stadion Kranjčevićeva
- Prva HNL: 8th
- Croatian Cup: Second round
- UEFA Champions League: Second qualifying round
- UEFA Europa League: Third qualifying round
Home colours	Away colours

The 2020–21 season was NK Lokomotiva's 107th season in existence and the club's 12th consecutive season in the top flight of Croatian football. In addition to the domestic league, Lokomotiva competed in this season's edition of the Croatian Football Cup, the UEFA Champions League and the UEFA Europa League. The season covers the period from 1 July 2020 to 30 June 2021.

== Players ==
=== Current squad ===
As of 1 June 2020

Note: Flags indicate national team as defined under FIFA eligibility rules; some limited exceptions apply. Players may hold more than one non-FIFA nationality.

No.	Pos.	Nation	Player
1	GK	CRO	Bruno Bermanec
2	FW	NGR	Iyayi Atiemwen (on loan from Dinamo Zagreb)
3	DF	BIH	Stipo Marković
4	DF	CRO	Frane Vojković
5	FW	SRB	Đorđe Rakić
6	DF	CRO	Dominik Kovačić
7	FW	ALB	Myrto Uzuni
8	MF	CRO	Oliver Petrak
9	FW	CRO	Mario Budimir
10	MF	CRO	Sammir
11	DF	CRO	Ivan Čeliković
12	GK	CRO	Krunoslav Hendija
13	GK	CRO	Ivo Grbić
14	MF	SEN	Pape Assane Mbodji

No.	Pos.	Nation	Player
15	MF	CRO	Josip Majić
16	DF	ALB	Jon Mersinaj
17	FW	ALB	Indrit Tuci
18	MF	ALB	Enis Çokaj
19	DF	CRO	Luka Smoljo
20	DF	CRO	Denis Kolinger
21	FW	CRO	Loren Maružin
22	FW	KOS	Lirim Kastrati (on loan from Dinamo Zagreb)
23	MF	CRO	Kristijan Jakić
24	MF	CRO	Marko Tolić
26	DF	AUS	Fran Karačić (on loan from Dinamo Zagreb)
28	DF	CRO	Dino Halilović
29	DF	AUT	Petar Gluhakovic
44	DF	SRB	Nikola Pejović

=== Out on loan ===
Note: Flags indicate national team as defined under FIFA eligibility rules; some limited exceptions apply. Players may hold more than one non-FIFA nationality.

No.	Pos.	Nation	Player
27	MF	BRA	Emerson Santana
31	MF	ALB	Albion Marku (at (Albania) Laçi until 30 June 2020)

== Transfers ==
=== In ===
No.	Pos	Player	Transferred from	Fee	Date	Source
15			TBD		1 July 2020	

=== Out ===
No.	Pos	Player	Transferred to	Fee	Date	Source
15			TBD		1 July 2020	

== Pre-season and friendlies ==
Win Draw Loss Fixtures

== Competitions ==
=== Overview ===
Competition	First match	Last match	Starting round	Final position	Record							
Competition	First match	Last match	Starting round	Final position	Pld	W	D	L	GF	GA	GD	Win %
HT Prva liga	16 August 2020	16 May 2021	Matchday 1		8	1	4	3	6	13	−7	12.50
Croatian Cup	7 October 2020		First round		0	0	0	0	0	0	+0	—
Champions League	26 August 2020		Second qualifying round	Second qualifying round	1	0	0	1	0	1	−1	0.00
Europa League	24 September 2020		Third qualifying round	Third qualifying round	1	0	0	1	0	5	−5	0.00
Total					10	1	4	5	6	19	−13	10.00

Last updated: 1 November 2020
Source: Soccerway

=== HT Prva liga ===
==== League table ====
Pos	Team	Pld	W	D	L	GF	GA	GD	Pts	Qualification or relegation
6	Šibenik	36	9	8	19	32	47	−15	35	
7	Slaven Belupo	36	7	13	16	36	53	−17	34	
8	Lokomotiva	36	7	9	20	29	60	−31	30	
9	Istra 1961	36	7	8	21	27	52	−25	29	
10	Varaždin (R)	36	6	10	20	30	61	−31	28	Relegation for the Croatian Second Football League

Source: PrvaHNL.hr
Rules for classification: 1) Points; 2) Head-to-head points; 3) Head-to-head goal difference; 4) Head-to-head goals scored (at home if two teams tied); 5) Goal difference; 6) Goals scored; 7) Play-off
(Note: Criteria 2-4 and 7 is only used if deciding champion, teams to international competition or teams for relegation and in that case criteria 6 will not be used).
(R) Relegated

==== Results summary ====
Overall								Home						Away					
Pld	W	D	L	GF	GA	GD	Pts	W	D	L	GF	GA	GD	W	D	L	GF	GA	GD
8	1	4	3	6	13	−7	7	1	2	1	3	3	0	0	2	2	3	10	−7

Last updated: 1 November 2020.
Source: Prva HNL

==== Results by round ====
Round	1	2	3	4	5	6	7	8	9	10
Ground	A	H	A	H	A	A	H	H	A	H
Result	L	W	D	L	L	D	D	P	P	D
Position	10	6	6	7	9					

Updated to match(es) played on 1 November 2020. Source: Prva HNL
A = Away; H = Home; W = Win; D = Draw; L = Loss

==== Matches ====
16 August 2020 1	Dinamo Zagreb	6–0	Lokomotiva	Zagreb
20:05 CEST (UTC+2)	Majer 6', 27'; Burton (yellow card) 43'; Gavranović 50'; Stojanović (yellow card) 68'; Oršić 78'; Ivanušec 79'; Andrić 89'	Report	Kolinger (yellow card) 32'; Osmanković (yellow card) 61'	Stadium: Stadion Maksimir; Attendance: 0 Referee: Fran Jović

21 August 2020 2	Lokomotiva	1–0	Rijeka	Zagreb
17:55 CEST (UTC+2)	Sammir (yellow card) 22'; Halilović (yellow card) 44', (goal) 53'; Vojković (yellow card) 73'	Report	Raspopović (yellow card) 85'	Stadium: Kranjčevićeva; Attendance: 0 Referee: Duje Strukan

30 August 2020 3	Varaždin	1–1	Lokomotiva	Varaždin
17:55 CEST (UTC+2)	Mehdikhani 44'; Đurasek (yellow card) 62'; Delić (yellow card) 64'; Senić (yellow card) 77'	Report	Kallaku (yellow card) 22'; Rodin 49' (o.g.); Çokaj (yellow card) 86'	Stadium: Stadion Varteks; Attendance: 0 Referee: Igor Pajač

13 September 2020 4	Lokomotiva	1–2	Gorica	Zagreb
19:05 CEST (UTC+2)	Kovačić (yellow card) 62'; Karačić 89'	Report	Čabraja (yellow card) 18'; Lovrić 32', 85'; Dvorneković (yellow card) 66'	Stadium: Kranjčevićeva; Attendance: 0 Referee: Dario Kulušić

18 September 2020 5	Šibenik	3–2	Lokomotiva	Šibenik
18:00 CEST (UTC+2)	Ampem 11', 84'; Jurić 39'	Report	Kallaku 33'; Kovačić (yellow card) 55'; Đira (yellow card) 63'; Sammir 69'; Majić (yellow card) 84'	Stadium: Stadion Šubićevac; Attendance: 1,000; Referee: Mario Zebec

2 October 2020 7	Lokomotiva	0–0	Istra 1961	Zagreb
18:00 CEST (UTC+2)		Report		Stadium: Kranjčevićeva; Attendance: 330; Referee: Tihomir Pejin

28 October 2020 6	Slaven Belupo	0–0	Lokomotiva	Koprivnica
17:00 CET (UTC+1)		Report		Stadium: Gradski stadion Attendance: 0 Referee: Tihomir Pejin

1 November 2020 10	Lokomotiva	1–1	Dinamo Zagreb	Zagreb
17:05 CET (UTC+1)	Maliqi (yellow card) 37'; Ibrahim 42'; Kolinger (yellow card) 75'	Report	Ivanušec 8'; Burton (yellow card) 40'	Stadium: Kranjčevićeva; Referee: Duje Strukan

=== UEFA Champions League ===
26 August 2020 Second qualifying round	Lokomotiva (Croatia)	0–1	(Austria) Rapid Wien	Zagreb, Croatia
19:00 CEST (UTC+2)	Tuci (yellow card) 40'; Petrak (yellow card) 69'; Sammir (yellow card) 75'	Report	Kara 32'; Ljubicic (yellow card) 52'; Hofmann (yellow card) 55'; Arase (yellow card) 57'	Stadium: Stadion Kranjčevićeva; Attendance: 0 Referee: Juan Martínez Munuera (Spain)

=== UEFA Europa League ===
24 September 2020 Third qualifying round	Malmö FF (Sweden)	5–0	(Croatia) Lokomotiva	Malmö, Sweden
19:00 CEST (UTC+2)	Kiese Thelin 5', 17'; Nalić 31'; Larsson 52'; Rieks 72'	Report	Karačić (yellow card) 64'; Kovačić (yellow card) 76'	Stadium: Eleda Stadion; Attendance: 0 Referee: François Letexier (France)

== Statistics ==
=== Goalscorers ===
As of 23 August 2020

Rank	No.	Pos	Nat	Name	HT Prva liga	Croatian Cup	Champions League	Total
1	28	DF	(Croatia)	Dino Halilović	1	0	0	1
Totals					1	0	0	1
