= 2014–15 NK Zagreb season =

Zagreb
2014–15 season
- Chairman: Dražen Medić
- Manager: Željko Kopić
- Prva HNL: 5th
- Croatian Cup: Sixteen finals
- Top goalscorer: League: G. Boban (12); All: G. Boban (12)
- Highest home attendance: 3,000 v Dinamo Zagreb, 09 May 2015
- Lowest home attendance: 100 v Slaven Belupo, 08 February 2015
| Home colours | Away colours | Third colours |

The 2014–15 season is twenty-third season for NK Zagreb in the Prva HNL.

== First-team squad ==
As of 22 January 2015

Note: Flags indicate national team as defined under FIFA eligibility rules; some limited exceptions apply. Players may hold more than one non-FIFA nationality.

| No. | Pos. | Nation | Player |
|---|---|---|---|
| 1 | GK | (Croatia) CRO | Dominik Livaković |
| 4 | DF | (Croatia) CRO | Dominik Kovačić |
| 5 | FW | (Australia) AUS | Roko Strika |
| 7 | MF | (Croatia) CRO | Josip Jurendić |
| 8 | FW | (Croatia) CRO | Mario Ćubel |
| 9 | FW | (Croatia) CRO | Lovro Medić |
| 10 | MF | (Croatia) CRO | Filip Krovinović |
| 11 | FW | (Croatia) CRO | Miroslav Konopek |
| 12 | GK | (Croatia) CRO | Josip Čondrić |
| 14 | DF | (Bosnia and Herzegovina) BIH | Dino Bevab |
| 15 | GK | (Croatia) CRO | Jakša Herceg |
| 16 | MF | (Croatia) CRO | Robert Mudražija |

| No. | Pos. | Nation | Player |
|---|---|---|---|
| 18 | MF | (Croatia) CRO | Marijo Dučkić |
| 19 | MF | (Croatia) CRO | Matias Šulc |
| 20 | DF | (Croatia) CRO | Denis Kolinger |
| 21 | MF | (Croatia) CRO | Valentino Stepčić |
| 22 | DF | (Croatia) CRO | Dino Štiglec |
| 23 | DF | (Croatia) CRO | Božo Musa |
| 24 | MF | (Croatia) CRO | Ivan Ljubičić |
| 26 | MF | (Croatia) CRO | Vedran Jurjević |
| 27 | DF | (Croatia) CRO | Bernardo Matić |
| 29 | DF | (Bosnia and Herzegovina) BIH | Edin Šehić |
| 30 | FW | (Croatia) CRO | Gabrijel Boban |
| 99 | FW | (Croatia) CRO | Bruno Boban |

Source:, Last updated unknown

== League table ==
| Pos | Team | Pld | W | D | L | GF | GA | GD | Pts | Qualification or relegation |
|---|---|---|---|---|---|---|---|---|---|---|
| 3 | Hajduk Split (Note: Hajduk Split were deducted 3 points for not showing up for the match against Dinamo Zagreb in the 16th round.) | 36 | 15 | 8 | 13 | 59 | 56 | +3 | 50 | Qualification to Europa League first qualifying round |
| 4 | Lokomotiva | 36 | 13 | 7 | 16 | 59 | 68 | −9 | 46 | Qualification to Europa League first qualifying round |
| 5 | NK Zagreb | 36 | 13 | 7 | 16 | 45 | 54 | −9 | 46 | |
| 6 | Slaven Belupo | 36 | 11 | 9 | 16 | 38 | 49 | −11 | 42 | |
| 7 | RNK Split | 36 | 9 | 14 | 13 | 42 | 49 | −7 | 41 | |

Source: Sportnet.hr
Rules for classification: 1) points; 2) goal difference; 3) number of goals scored.
For deciding champions, qualification to UEFA Europa League and relegation: 1st points; 2nd head-to-head points; 3rd head-to-head goal difference; 4th head-to-head away goals scored
