= Art Smakaj =

Kosovan footballer (born 2003)

Personal information
- Date of birth: 4 February 2003 (age 23)
- Place of birth: Zagreb, Croatia
- Height: 1.83 m (6 ft 0 in)
- Position: Defensive midfielder

Team information
- Current team: LASK
- Number: 5

Youth career
- –2013: Dinamo Zagreb
- 2013–2016: Trnje
- 2016–2022: Lokomotiva

Senior career*
Years	Team	Apps	(Gls)
2022–2025	Lokomotiva	74	(3)
2025–	LASK	6	(0)

International career^{‡}
2021	Kosovo U19	2	(0)
2022–	Kosovo U21	11	(0)
2024–	Kosovo	1	(0)
- * Club domestic league appearances and goals as of 13 September 2025 ‡ National team caps and goals as of 5 June 2024

Art Smakaj (born 4 February 2003) is a professional footballer who plays as a defensive midfielder for Austrian Bundesliga club LASK. Born in Croatia, he represents Kosovo at international level.

== Club career ==
On 11 December 2021, Smakaj was named as a Lokomotiva substitute for the first time in a Croatian First League match against Hajduk Split. His debut with Lokomotiva came on 26 February 2022 in a 2–0 home win against Gorica after being named in the starting line-up.

== International career ==
=== Under-19 ===
On 30 September 2021, Smakaj was named as part of the Kosovo U19 squad for UEFA Euro 2022 qualifications. Six days later, he made his debut with Kosovo U19 in the match against Norway U19 after being named in the starting line-up.

=== Under-21 ===
On 30 May 2022, Smakaj received a call-up from Kosovo U21 for the UEFA Euro 2023 qualification matches against Andorra U21, England U21 and Albania U21. His debut with Kosovo U21 came on 4 June in the UEFA Euro 2023 qualification match against Andorra after coming on as a substitute at 74th minute in place of Qëndrim Zyba.

=== Senior ===
On 30 May 2024, Smakaj received a call-up from Kosovo for a friendly match against Norway, and made his debut after coming on as a substitute at 78th minute in place of Lindon Emërllahu.

== Career statistics ==
=== Club ===
As of match played 13 September 2025

Appearances and goals by club, season and competition
Club	Season	League			National cup (Note: Includes Croatian Football Cup, Austrian Cup)		Europe		Total	
Club	Season	Division	Apps	Goals	Apps	Goals	Apps	Goals	Apps	Goals
Lokomotiva	2021–22	Croatian Football League	3	0	0	0	—		3	0
Lokomotiva	2022–23	Croatian Football League	13	0	1	0	—		14	0
Lokomotiva	2023–24	Croatian Football League	26	1	4	0	—		30	1
Lokomotiva	2024–25	Croatian Football League	32	2	2	0	—		34	2
Lokomotiva	Total		74	3	7	0	—		81	3
LASK	2025–26	Austrian Bundesliga	6	0	2	1	—		8	1
LASK	2026–27	Austrian Bundesliga	0	0	0	0	0	0	0	0
LASK	Total		6	0	2	1	0	0	8	1
Career total			80	3	9	1	0	0	89	4

=== International ===
As of match played 5 June 2024

Appearances and goals by national team and year
National team	Year	Apps	Goals
Kosovo	2024	1	0
Total		1	0

== Honours ==
LASK

- Austrian Cup: 2025–26
