= Robert Mudražija =

Croatian footballer

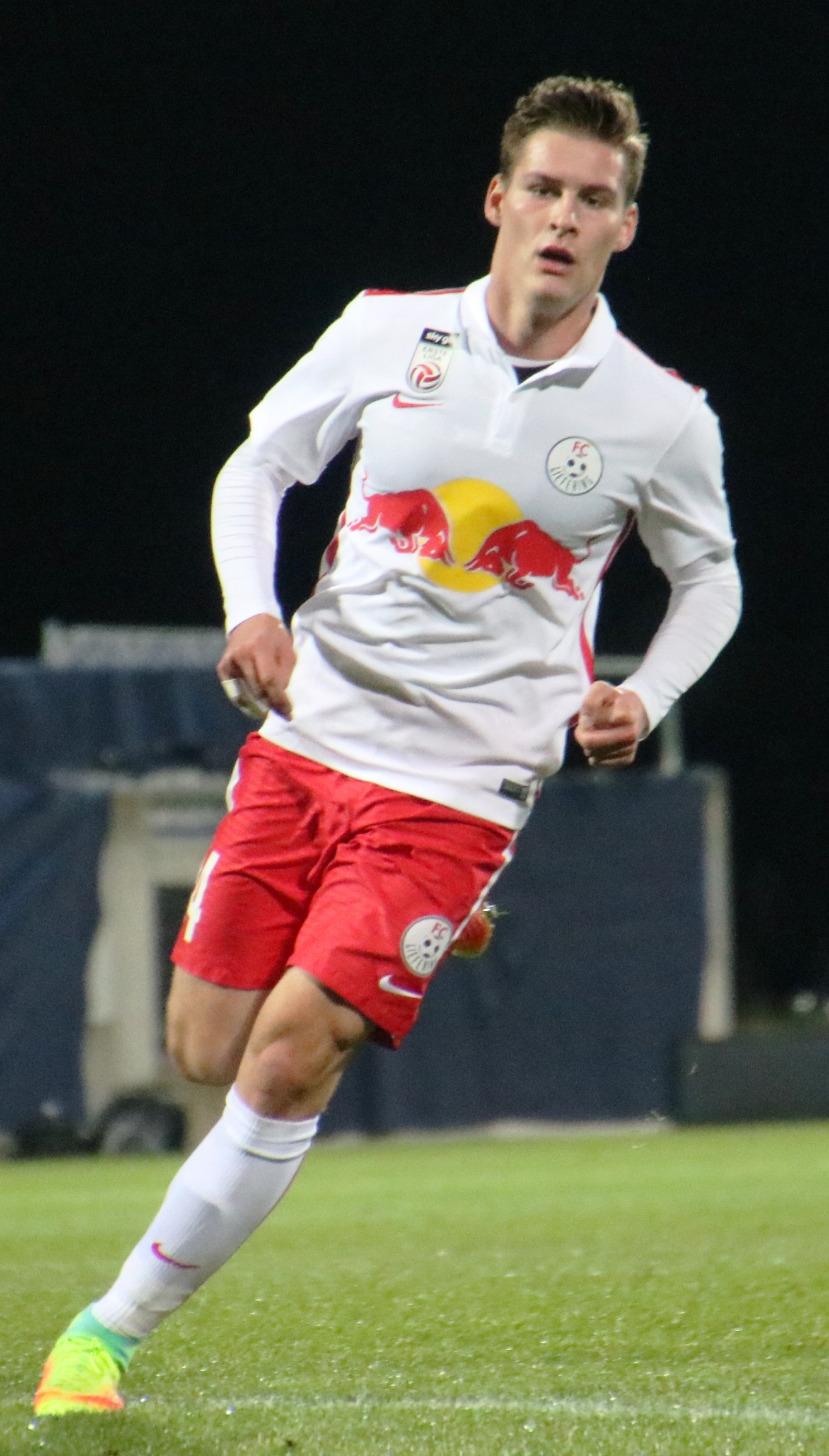
- Mudražija in 2016

Personal information
- Date of birth: 5 May 1997 (age 29)
- Place of birth: Zagreb, Croatia
- Height: 1.77 m (5 ft 10 in)
- Position: Midfielder

Team information
- Current team: Dinamo Zagreb
- Number: 20

Youth career
- 2005–2012: Dinamo Zagreb
- 2012–2015: NK Zagreb

Senior career*
Years	Team	Apps	(Gls)
2014–2016	NK Zagreb	39	(1)
2016–2017	FC Liefering	10	(0)
2017–2019	Osijek	42	(2)
2019–2022	Copenhagen	20	(0)
2021	→ Rijeka (loan)	20	(0)
2022	→ Olimpija Ljubljana (loan)	15	(1)
2022–2023	Slaven Belupo	27	(1)
2023–2025	Lokomotiva	61	(20)
2025–	Dinamo Zagreb	8	(1)
2026	→ AEK Larnaca (loan)	11	(1)

International career
2015	Croatia U18	2	(2)
2014–2016	Croatia U19	7	(0)
2018	Croatia U20	1	(0)
2018	Croatia U21	2	(0)
- * Club domestic league appearances and goals as of 22 August 2026

Robert Mudražija (born 5 May 1997) is a Croatian professional footballer who plays as a midfielder for Dinamo Zagreb.

== Early career ==
Born in Zagreb in 1997, Mudražija started his football career with Dinamo Zagreb. He left the team at the age of 15 when he joined NK Zagreb youth team.

== Club career ==
Mudražija started his professional career with NK Zagreb in the Croatian First Football League in 2014. After spending two seasons with the club, he moved to FC Liefering of the Austrian second tier in 2016. In June 2017 he returned to Croatia where he joined Osijek. On 28 January 2019, it was announced that Mudražija would be joining Copenhagen for an undisclosed fee believed to be around €3 million. On 26 January 2021, Copenhagen announced that Mudražija would be loaned to his native nation's Rijeka for a period of 18 months. In December 2021, he was loaned to Slovenian PrvaLiga side Olimpija Ljubljana.

== International career ==
Mudražija was capped for the Croatian under-18, under-19, under-20, and under-21 sides.

== Career statistics ==
As of match played on 4 October 2026

Appearances and goals by club, season and competition
Club	Season	League			Cup		Europe		Total	
Club	Season	Division	Apps	Goals	Apps	Goals	Apps	Goals	Apps	Goals
NK Zagreb	2014–15	Croatian Football League	17	1	0	0	—		17	1
NK Zagreb	2015–16	Croatian Football League	22	0	2	0	—		24	0
NK Zagreb	Total		39	1	2	0	—		41	1
FC Liefering	2016–17	2 Liga	10	0	—		—		10	0
Osijek	2017–18	Croatian Football League	31	1	1	0	5 (Note: Appearances in UEFA Conference League)	0	37	1
Osijek	2018–19	Croatian Football League	11	1	1	0	3 (Note: Appearances in UEFA Europa League)	0	12	1
Osijek	Total		42	2	2	0	8	0	52	2
Copenhagen	2018–19	Danish Superliga	2	0	—		—		2	0
Copenhagen	2019–20	Danish Superliga	10	0	0	0	4	0	14	0
Copenhagen	2020–21	Danish Superliga	8	0	2	0	3	1	13	1
Copenhagen	Total		20	0	2	0	7	0	29	1
Rijeka (loan)	2020–21	Croatian Football League	17	0	0	0	0	0	17	0
Rijeka (loan)	2021–22	Croatian Football League	3	0	1	0	0	0	4	0
Rijeka (loan)	Total		20	0	1	0	0	0	21	0
Olimpija Ljubljana (loan)	2021–22	Slovenian PrvaLiga	15	1	—		—		15	1
Slaven Belupo	2022–23	Croatian Football League	27	1	3	0	—		30	1
Lokomotiva	2023–24	Croatian Football League	28	6	4	2	—		32	8
Lokomotiva	2024–25	Croatian Football League	33	14	3	1	—		36	15
Lokomotiva	Total		61	20	7	3	—		68	23
Dinamo Zagreb	2025–26	Croatian Football League	6	0	1	0	0	0	7	0
Dinamo Zagreb	2026–27	Croatian Football League	2	1	2	0	2 (Note: Two appearances in UEFA Champions League)	0	6	1
Dinamo Zagreb	Total		8	1	3	0	2	0	13	1
AEK Larnaca (loan)	2025–26	Cypriot First Division	11	1	—		—		11	1
Career total			253	27	20	3	17	1	290	31

== Honours ==
Copenhagen

- Danish Superliga: 2018–19
