= Matija Krivokapić =

Montenegrin association footballer

Personal information
- Full name: Matija Krivokapić
- Date of birth: 19 March 2003 (age 23)
- Place of birth: Nikšić, Serbia and Montenegro
- Height: 1.87 m (6 ft 2 in)
- Positions: Striker; left winger

Team information
- Current team: Bunyodkor
- Number: 9

Youth career
- Junior Nikšić
- FK Sutjeska
- FK Podgorica

Senior career*
Years	Team	Apps	(Gls)
2021–2022	FK Podgorica	42	(10)
2023–2024	DAC Dunajská Streda	0	(0)
2023	→ Michalovce (loan)	3	(0)
2023	→ Győr (loan)	0	(0)
2023–2024	→ ŠTK 1914 Šamorín	19	(11)
2024–2025	Győr	13	(1)
2025	→ Komárno (loan)	3	(0)
2025–	Bunyodkor	23	(7)

International career^{‡}
2021–2022	Montenegro U19	4	(1)
2023–	Montenegro U21	7	(1)
- * Club domestic league appearances and goals as of 29 July 2026 ‡ National team caps and goals as of 14 January 2026

Matija Krivokapić (Montenegrin: Матија Кривокапић; born 19 March 2003) is a Montenegrin footballer who plays as a striker for Hungarian club Győr.

== Club career ==
Born in Nikišić. He started his career in hometown clubs, Junior Nikšić and then moved to FK Sutjeska.

=== FK Podgorica ===
He joined FK Podgorica in 2018. At the age of 17, he started playing for the first team of FK Podgorica. During one and half year for FK Podgorica, he netted 10 league goals in 42 appearances.

=== DAC Dunajská Streda ===
Krivokapić became DAC Dunajská Streda player on 8 February 2023, signing contract until June 2026.

==== Loan at MFK Zemplín Michalovce ====
Currently, he is loaned at Zemplín Michalovce until June 2023.
