= Hajdin Salihu =

Kosovan footballer

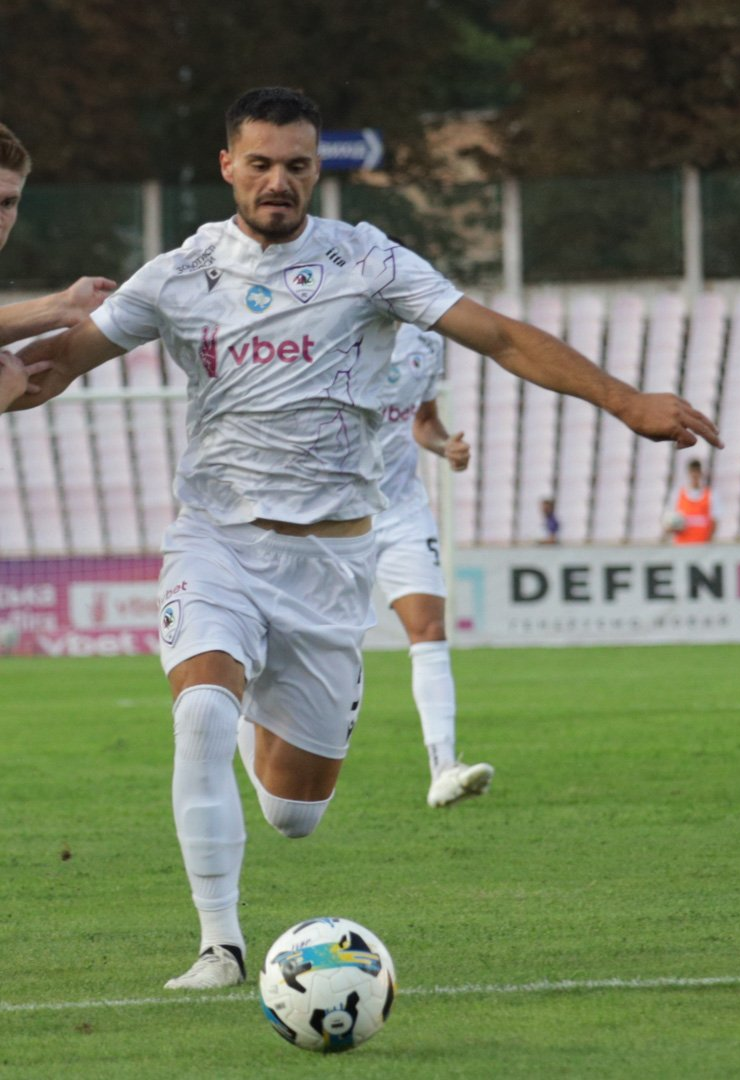
- Salihu with LNZ Cherkasy in 2024

Personal information
- Full name: Hajdin Salihu
- Date of birth: 18 January 2002 (age 24)
- Place of birth: Podujevo, Kosovo under UN administration
- Height: 1.88 m (6 ft 2 in)
- Position: Centre-back

Team information
- Current team: Drita

Youth career
- Besiana
- –2018: Kurda Football School
- 2018–2021: Llapi
- 2020–2021: → Lokomotiva (loan)

Senior career*
Years	Team	Apps	(Gls)
2018–2021	Llapi	12	(0)
2020–2021	→ Lokomotiva (loan)	3	(0)
2021–2023	Lokomotiva	11	(0)
2022	→ Laçi (loan)	0	(0)
2023–2024	Drita	16	(0)
2024–2026	LNZ Cherkasy	34	(4)
2025–2026	→ Polonia Warsaw (loan)	27	(1)
2026–	Drita	0	(0)

International career
2018	Kosovo U17	3	(0)
2019	Kosovo U19	2	(0)
- * Club domestic league appearances and goals as of 15:21, 29 May 2026 (UTC)

Hajdin Salihu (born 18 January 2002) is a Kosovan professional footballer who plays as a centre-back for Football Superleague of Kosovo club Drita.

== Club career ==
=== Early career and Llapi ===
Salihu is a product of the two most famous football schools in Kosovo, Besiana and Kurda. On 19 June 2018, he joined Football Superleague of Kosovo side Llapi, and received squad number 15. On 1 November 2019, he made his debut in a 1–0 home win against Drenica after being named in the starting line-up.

=== Lokomotiva ===
==== Period on loan ====
On 18 October 2020, Salihu joined Croatian First League side Lokomotiva, on a season-long loan. On 27 February 2021, he was named as a Lokomotiva substitute for the first time in a league match against Šibenik. His debut with Lokomotiva came fourteen days later in a 0–0 home draw against Istra 1961 after being named in the starting line-up.

==== Return as a permanent player ====
On 9 July 2021, Salihu signed a two-year contract with Croatian First League club Lokomotiva, transfer which was officially confirmed seventeen days later. Eight days later, he was named as a Lokomotiva substitute for the first time in a league match against Hajduk Split.

===== Short-time loan at Laçi and return from loan =====
On 17 January 2022, Salihu joined Kategoria Superiore side Laçi, on a season-long loan. Five days later, he was named as a Laçi substitute for the first time in a league match against Teuta Durrës. On 10 February 2022, Salihu returned from loan to replace one of Lokomotiva's injured defenders. Two days later, he played the first game after the return against Istra 1961 after being named in the starting line-up.

=== Drita ===
In June 2023, Salihu joined Kosovan club Drita, starting from 1 July 2023. He signed a contract until 30 June 2026.

== International career ==
=== Kosovo ===
Salihu represented Kosovo U17 in the 2019 UEFA European Under-17 Championship qualifications, helping Kosovo top their group in the qualifying round. He also represented Kosovo at U19 and U21 level with the latter was part in two 2021 UEFA European Under-21 Championship qualification matches as an unused substitute.

=== Albania ===
On 16 March 2021, Lokomotiva through a communiqué stated that Salihu switched his allegiance to Albania U21 and received the call-up for the March gathering. On 20 March 2021, he received a call-up from Albania U21 for a training camp held from 22 to 30 March 2021 and for unofficial friendly match against Tirana and Bylis.
