= Indrit Tuci =

Albanian footballer (born 2000)

Personal information
- Date of birth: 14 September 2000 (age 26)
- Place of birth: Lezhë, Albania
- Height: 1.91 m (6 ft 3 in)
- Positions: Centre forward; right winger

Team information
- Current team: Olimpija Ljubljana
- Number: 19

Youth career
- –2012: Laçi
- 2012–2016: AF Brians
- 2016–2018: Akademia e Futbollit
- 2019: Lokomotiva Zagreb

Senior career*
Years	Team	Apps	(Gls)
2019–2023	Lokomotiva Zagreb	94	(20)
2024–2026	Sparta Prague	20	(2)
2025	→ Sparta Prague B	3	(2)
2025–2026	→ Kayserispor (loan)	20	(3)
2026–	Olimpija Ljubljana	11	(6)

International career^{‡}
2018	Albania U19	2	(0)
2019–2022	Albania U21	7	(1)
2024–	Albania	5	(0)
- * Club domestic league appearances and goals as of 21 November 2026 ‡ National team caps and goals as of 13 November 2025

Indrit Tuci (born 14 September 2000) is an Albanian professional footballer who plays as a centre forward for Olimpija Ljubljana and the Albania national team.

Having started playing football in Albania, he moved to Croatia in 2018 to join Lokomotiva Zagreb, where he spent five seasons, before signing for Sparta Prague in 2023, winning both the Czech First League and the Czech Cup in his first season. In 2025, he was loaned to Kayserispor in Turkey.

At international level, he represented Albania at youth categories before making his senior debut in 2024.

== Club career ==
=== Early career ===
Tuci began playing football at the age of six, before joining the youth teams of Laçi, AF Brians in Lezhë and Akademia e Futbollit in Tirana.

In 2018, he joined Lokomotiva Zagreb after impressing during a one-month trial, initially playing for the under-19 team before progressing to the first team within six months. In July 2020, Lokomotiva youth coach Besnik Prenga praised his intelligence and understanding of the game, describing him as a centre-forward who could also play as a second striker.

=== Lokomotiva Zagreb ===
Tuci made his first-team debut for Lokomotiva Zagreb under manager Goran Tomić at the age of 18 on 26 May 2019, coming on as a 77th-minute substitute in a 3–2 defeat to Gorica in the final round of the 2018–19 Croatian First League.

During the 2019–20 season, Tuci established himself as a regular first-team option at Lokomotiva, featuring mainly as a substitute while also making occasional starts. He scored his first league goal on 27 October 2019, netting in stoppage time in a 2–0 win over Istra 1961. He scored the winning goal in a 2–1 victory over Varaždin on 4 November 2019. On 21 June 2020, he scored the equaliser in a 3–2 comeback win over Hajduk Split, after Lokomotiva had fallen two goals behind. Nine days later, he scored the opening goal in a 2–0 win over Varaždin. He made 25 league appearances, including 11 starts, playing 1,101 minutes, as Lokomotiva finished second in the league and qualified for the UEFA Champions League qualifying rounds for the first time in the club's history. Tuci made three appearances in the Croatian Cup as Lokomotiva reached the final, where it lost 1–0 to Rijeka.

On 26 August 2020, Tuci made his debut in the UEFA Champions League qualifying, starting in Lokomotiva's historic first appearance in the competition, a 1–0 defeat to Rapid Wien in the second qualifying round. Following Lokomotiva's elimination from the Champions League, Tuci made his UEFA Europa League debut on 24 September 2020, entering as a 69th-minute substitute in a 5–0 away defeat to Malmö FF in the third qualifying round, which ended the club's European campaign. He scored his first league goal of the 2020–21 season on 24 November, in a 2–1 defeat to Hajduk Split. Four days later, he scored in a 1–1 draw against Gorica, following an assist from compatriot Sherif Kallaku. On 13 December, he scored in a 2–1 comeback win over Slaven Belupo. In January 2021, Tuci suffered a serious knee ligament injury during training, which required surgery and kept him out of action for ten months. He returned to scoring on 11 March 2022, netting in a 4–1 win over Šibenik.

On 30 October 2022, he scored a stoppage-time equaliser in a 2–2 draw against Hajduk Split, after Lokomotiva had fallen two goals behind; he had also assisted Ibrahim Aliyu's goal in the 88th minute. On 21 April 2023, he scored the only goal in a 1–0 win over Šibenik, coming off the bench to find the net in the 80th minute. He also scored in a 2–2 draw against Gorica on 1 May 2023. He finished the 2022–23 league campaign with 30 appearances, including nine starts, playing 1,175 minutes and recording six goals and five assists, as Lokomotiva finished seventh.

Tuci established himself as a regular starter during the first half of the 2023–24 season, scoring six goals and providing three assists in 17 league appearances. On 15 September 2023, he scored the only goal in a 1–0 win over Rudeš, converting a free kick from approximately 25 metres. He also opened the scoring in a 2–1 defeat to Dinamo Zagreb on 29 October. On 29 December 2023, Tuci transferred to Sparta Prague for a reported €1 million, with Lokomotiva also retaining a percentage of a future transfer. He left the Croatian club having scored 21 goals and provided 11 assists in 105 appearances.

=== Sparta Prague ===
On 29 December 2023, Tuci signed a multi-year contract with Czech club Sparta Prague. On 22 February 2024, he scored and provided an assist in a 4–1 victory over Galatasaray in the second leg of the Europa League knockout round play-offs, helping Sparta advance to the round of 16 with a 6–4 aggregate win. He also provided two assists during Sparta's run to the Czech Cup final, where the club defeated Viktoria Plzeň 2–1 on 22 May, completing a domestic league and cup double.

On 30 July 2024, Tuci scored Sparta's fourth goal in a 4–2 victory over Shamrock Rovers in the 2024–25 UEFA Champions League second qualifying round, securing a 6–2 aggregate win and qualification for the third qualifying round. He scored his first league goal for the club on 10 August, netting a stoppage-time equaliser in a 2–1 away win over Bohemians 1905. A week later, he scored again in a 2–1 victory over Jablonec, also providing the assist for Lukáš Haraslín's opening goal. An injury subsequently limited his involvement for the remainder of the season, during which he scored twice for Sparta's reserve team.

==== Loan to Kayserispor ====
On 9 August 2025, Tuci joined Turkish Süper Lig club Kayserispor on a one-year loan from Sparta Prague, with an option to buy. He scored his first goal for the club on 28 September, netting a stoppage-time equaliser in a 1–1 draw against Gençlerbirliği. On 28 October, he scored the only goal in a 1–0 win over Niğde Belediyespor in the Turkish Cup, helping Kayserispor advance to the fourth round. On 2 November, he scored the winning goal in an eventual 3–2 league victory over Kasımpaşa. He scored another equaliser on 3 May 2026, in a 1–1 draw against Eyüpspor. He made 22 appearances and scored four goals in all competitions during the loan spell before returning to Sparta, from which he subsequently joined Slovenian club Olimpija Ljubljana.

=== Olimpija Ljubljana ===
On 17 August 2026, Tuci signed a two-year contract with Slovenian PrvaLiga club Olimpija Ljubljana, with an option to extend for a further season. He scored his first goal for the club on 12 September, netting in a 3–1 away win over Koper. In November, he was named the Slovenian PrvaLiga Player of the Month for October after scoring three goals in four league matches. On 21 November, he scored the only goal from the penalty spot in a 1–0 win over Radomlje, taking his league tally to six goals.

== International career ==
Between 2018 and 2022, Tuci represented Albania at under-19 and under-21 level, scoring once for the latter.

In October 2024, he received his first call-up to the senior team by coach Sylvinho, replacing the injured Myrto Uzuni ahead of the 2024–25 UEFA Nations League B matches against the Czech Republic and Georgia. He made his debut on 11 October in a 2–0 defeat to the Czech Republic, coming on as a 65th-minute substitute for Mirlind Daku. Three days later, he started against Georgia and assisted Kristjan Asllani's winning goal in a 1–0 away victory. Tuci featured in Albania's final two matches of the campaign, starting the 0–0 draw against the Czech Republic and appearing as a substitute in the 2–1 defeat to Ukraine, as Albania finished bottom of the group and were relegated to League C.

Tuci was included in Albania's squad for the final two matches of the 2026 FIFA World Cup qualifiers and made a substitute appearance in Albania's 1–0 away win over Andorra on 13 November 2025, playing 14 minutes as Albania finished second in Group K and advanced to the play-offs for the first time in its history.

== Career statistics ==
=== Club ===
As of match played 21 November 2026

Appearances and goals by club, season and competition
Club	Season	League			National cup (Note: Includes Croatian Cup, Czech Cup & Turkish Cup)		Continental		Total	
Club	Season	Division	Apps	Goals	Apps	Goals	Apps	Goals	Apps	Goals
Lokomotiva Zagreb	2018–19	Croatian League	1	0	—		—		1	0
Lokomotiva Zagreb	2019–20	Croatian League	25	4	3	0	—		28	4
Lokomotiva Zagreb	2020–21	Croatian League	14	3	1	0	2 (Note: One appearance in UEFA Champions League, one appearance in UEFA Europa League)	0	17	3
Lokomotiva Zagreb	2021–22	Croatian League	7	1	1	0	—		8	1
Lokomotiva Zagreb	2022–23	Croatian League	30	6	3	1	—		33	7
Lokomotiva Zagreb	2023–24	Croatian League	17	6	1	0	—		18	6
Lokomotiva Zagreb	Total		94	20	9	1	2	0	105	21
Sparta Prague	2023–24	Czech First League	9	0	2	0	3 (Note: Appearance(s) in UEFA Europa League)	1	14	1
Sparta Prague	2024–25	Czech First League	11	2	0	0	4 (Note: Appearance(s) in UEFA Champions League)	1	15	3
Sparta Prague	Total		20	2	2	0	7	2	29	4
Sparta Prague B	2024–25	Czech National League	3	2	—		—		3	2
Kayserispor (loan)	2025–26	Süper Lig	20	3	2	1	—		22	4
NK Olimpija Ljubljana	2026–27	Slovenian PrvaLiga	11	6	—		—		11	6
Career total			148	33	13	2	9	2	170	37

=== International ===
As of match played 13 November 2025

Appearances and goals by national team and year
National team	Year	Apps	Goals
Albania
Albania	2024	4	0
Albania	2025	1	0
Total		5	0

== Honours ==
Sparta Prague

- Czech First League: 2023–24
- Czech Cup: 2023–24
