= Heitor (footballer, born April 2000) =

Brazilian footballer

Personal information
- Full name: Heitor Marinho dos Santos
- Date of birth: 27 April 2000 (age 26)
- Place of birth: Araçatuba, Brazil
- Height: 1.87 m (6 ft 2 in)
- Position: Centre-back

Team information
- Current team: Maccabi Tel Aviv
- Number: 4

Youth career
- 2017–2020: PSTC
- 2018–2020: → Grêmio (loan)
- 2020–2023: Grêmio

Senior career*
Years	Team	Apps	(Gls)
2020–2023	Grêmio	5	(0)
2023–2024	Levadia	40	(4)
2024–2025	Győr	26	(0)
2025–	Maccabi Tel Aviv	23	(1)
- * Club domestic league appearances and goals as of 23 June 2026

Heitor Marinho dos Santos (born 27 April 2000), known as Heitor, is a Brazilian professional footballer who plays as a centre-back for Israeli Premier League club Maccabi Tel Aviv.

== Club career ==
=== Grêmio ===
Born in Araçatuba, Brazil, Heitor joined the Grêmio's Academy at the age of 17 in 2017.

== Career statistics ==
=== Club ===
As of 1 June 2025.

Appearances and goals by club, season and competition
Club	Season	League			State League		National Cup		Continental		Other		Total	
Club	Season	Division	Apps	Goals	Apps	Goals	Apps	Goals	Apps	Goals	Apps	Goals	Apps	Goals
Grêmio	2020	Série A	0	0	—		—		0	0	—		0	0
Grêmio	2021	Série A	0	0	3 (Note: Appearance(s) in Campeonato Gaúcho.)	0	0	0	1 (Note: Appearance(s) in Copa Sudamericana.)	0	—		4	0
Grêmio	2022	Série B	0	0	2	0	0	0	0	0	—		2	0
Grêmio	Total		0	0	5	0	0	0	1	0	0	0	6	0
Levadia Tallinn	2023	Meistriliiga	23	3	—		—		0	0	—		23	3
Levadia Tallinn	2024	Meistriliiga	17	1	—		4	0	6	0	—		23	1
Levadia Tallinn	Total		50	1	0	0	4	0	6	0	0	0	60	1
Győr	2024–25	Nemzeti Bajnokság I	26	0	—		1	0	0	0	—		27	0
Maccabi Tel Aviv	2025–26	Israeli Premier League	0	0	—		0	0	0	0	—		0	0
Career total			76	1	6	0	4	0	7	0	0	0	93	2

== Honours ==
Grêmio

- Campeonato Gaúcho: 2021, 2022
- Recopa Gaúcha: 2021, 2022
