= Mario Ćubel =

Croatian footballer

Personal information
- Date of birth: 20 March 1990 (age 36)
- Place of birth: Slavonski Brod, SR Croatia, SFR Yugoslavia
- Height: 1.75 m (5 ft 9 in)
- Position: Winger

Team information
- Current team: Vinogorac

Youth career
- –2004: Amater
- 2004–2007: Budainka
- 2007–2009: Slavonac CO

Senior career*
Years	Team	Apps	(Gls)
2008–2009	Slavonac CO		
2010	Oriolik		
2010	Slatina		
2011	Marsonia		
2011–2013	NK Rudeš	52	(20)
2013–2014	Hrvatski Dragovoljac	1	(0)
2014–2016	Zagreb	24	(0)
2016–2017	NK Rudeš	29	(2)
2018	Marsonia		
2018–2019	Croatia Ulm	26	(14)
2020	Marsonia		
2020-	Vinogorac Slavonski B.		
- * Club domestic league appearances and goals as of 1 July 2018

Mario Ćubel (born 20 March 1990) is a Croatian professional footballer who plays as a winger.

== Career ==
Ćubel was born in Slavonski Brod. He passed through several lower-tier clubs in the Slavonia region such as Amater Slavonski Brod, Budainka, Slavonac CO, Oriolik, Slatina and Marsonia before moving to NK Rudeš in Zagreb in 2011. He was named as the best player of Druga HNL after the 2012–13 season by the Sportske novosti magazine. On 18 July 2014, Ćubel signed a five-year contract with Croatian club NK Zagreb.

In the summer of 2016 he went on trial at NK Istra 1961, but did not pass, moving subsequently to NK Rudeš, attaining promotion to Prva HNL at the end of the 2016–17 season. He had two half-seasons abroad, with German amateur side Croatia Ulm.

In February 2020 he re-registered with hometown club Marsonia.
