= Lukas Kačavenda =

Croatian footballer (born 2003)

Personal information
- Date of birth: 2 March 2003 (age 23)
- Place of birth: Zagreb, Croatia
- Height: 1.74 m (5 ft 9 in)
- Position: Attacking midfielder

Team information
- Current team: Dinamo Zagreb
- Number: 80

Youth career
- –2015: Kustošija
- 2015–2017: Dinamo Zagreb
- 2017–2021: Lokomotiva Zagreb

Senior career*
Years	Team	Apps	(Gls)
2021–2024	Lokomotiva Zagreb	56	(7)
2023–2024	→ Dinamo Zagreb (loan)	0	(0)
2024–	Dinamo Zagreb	33	(3)
2025–2026	→ LASK (loan)	12	(0)

International career
2021	Croatia U18	1	(0)
2021–2024	Croatia U21	17	(2)
- * Club domestic league appearances and goals as of 19:04, 18 October 2026 (UTC)

Lukas Kačavenda (born 2 March 2003) is a Croatian professional footballer who plays as an attacking midfielder for Croatian Football League club Dinamo Zagreb.

== Club career ==
Kačavenda was born in Zagreb, where his father hails from, while his mother hails from Sisak. He started playing football by joining the local club Kustošija. In 2015, he moved to the academy of the Croatian giants Dinamo Zagreb which he left two years later, unsatisfied with his playing time. He then joined Lokomotiva.

During the March international break in 2021, Lokomotiva played a friendly game with Orijent 1919 and the coach Samir Toplak called up several youth players to join the senior team. Toplak was impressed by Kačavenda and Luka Stojković and left them in the senior team permanently. Kačavenda made his debut on 3 April in a 2–0 defeat to Hajduk Split, coming on for Kim Jeong Hyun in the 65th minute. On 7 May, he provided Roko Šimić with an assist for the first goal and scored the second himself, as Lokomotiva defeated Slaven Belupo 3–1. He was credited as one of the key players who helped Lokomotiva preserve their first league status.

== International career ==
Kačavenda was not part of Croatia's youth teams until autumn 2021, when he was called up to Croatia under-21 national team by their coach Igor Bišćan for the upcoming UEFA Under-21 Euro 2023 qualifying, quickly establishing himself as a key player as Croatia finished the year with six victories out of six.

== Career statistics ==
As of match played 22 October 2026

Appearances and goals by club, season and competition
Club	Season	League			National cup (Note: Includes Croatian Football Cup, Austrian Cup)		Continental		Total	
Club	Season	Division	Apps	Goals	Apps	Goals	Apps	Goals	Apps	Goals
Lokomotiva Zagreb	2020–21	Prva HNL	10	1	0	0	0	0	10	1
Lokomotiva Zagreb	2021–22	Prva HNL	31	5	3	1	—		34	6
Lokomotiva Zagreb	2022–23	Prva HNL	15	0	1	0	—		16	0
Lokomotiva Zagreb	2023–24	Prva HNL	4	0	1	0	—		5	0
Lokomotiva Zagreb	Total		60	6	5	1	—		65	7
Dinamo Zagreb	2024–25	Prva HNL	24	2	2	0	6 (Note: Appearances in UEFA Champions League)	0	32	2
Dinamo Zagreb	2026–27	Prva HNL	9	1	2	0	9 (Note: Six appearances and three goals in UEFA Champions League, three appearances in UEFA Europa League)	3	20	4
Dinamo Zagreb	Total		33	3	4	0	15	3	52	6
LASK (loan)	2025–26	Austrian Bundesliga	12	0	5	1	—		17	1
Career total			105	9	14	2	15	3	134	14

== Honours ==
LASK

- Austrian Bundesliga: 2025–26
- Austrian Cup: 2025–26
