= Dino Grozdanić =

Croatian footballer

Personal information
- Date of birth: 27 December 2002 (age 23)
- Place of birth: Slavonski Brod, Croatia
- Height: 1.93 m (6 ft 4 in)
- Position: Centre-back

Team information
- Current team: Asteras Tripolis
- Number: 30

Youth career
- 2015–2017: Marsonia
- 2017–2018: Dinamo Zagreb
- 2018: Sesvete
- 2018–2021: Dinamo Zagreb
- 2021: → Hrvatski Dragovoljac (loan)
- 2021–2022: Asteras Tripolis

Senior career*
| Years | Team | Apps | (Gls) |
| 2022– | Asteras Tripolis | 9 | (1) |
| 2022 | → Kalamata (loan) | 0 | (0) |
| 2023 | → Diagoras (loan) | 13 | (0) |
| 2024– | Asteras Tripolis B | 27 | (0) |
| 2025 | → Győr (loan) | 0 | (0) |

International career^{‡}
| 2023–2024 | Croatia U21 | 7 | (0) |
- * Club domestic league appearances and goals as of 22 February 2026 ‡ National team caps and goals as of 7 June 2024

Dino Grozdanić (born 27 December 2002) is a Croatian professional footballer who plays as a centre-back for Greek Super League club Asteras Tripolis.

== Career ==
=== Asteras Tripolis ===
On 19 September 2023, Grozdanić made his professional debut for Asteras Tripolis.
