= Arbër Mehmetllari =

Albanian football player (born 2000)

Personal information
- Date of birth: 19 April 2000 (age 26)
- Place of birth: Tirana, Albania
- Height: 1.87 m (6 ft 2 in)
- Position: Centre forward

Team information
- Current team: Kastrioti

Youth career
- 2012–2016: Dinamo Tirana
- 2016–2018: Akademia e Futbollit
- 2018–2019: Lokomotiva

Senior career*
Years	Team	Apps	(Gls)
2019–2023	Lokomotiva	0	(0)
2019	→ Rudeš (loan)	2	(0)
2019–2020	→ Luftëtari (loan)	15	(2)
2020–2021	→ Bylis (loan)	24	(1)
2022	→ Dinamo Tirana (loan)	8	(0)
2023	Laçi	0	(0)
2023	Kukësi	3	(0)
2024–	Kastrioti	6	(1)
- * Club domestic league appearances and goals as of 1 June 2024

Arbër Mehmetllari (born 19 April 2000) is an Albanian professional footballer who plays as a centre forward for Albanian club Kastrioti.
