= Mateo Marić =

Bosnian association football player

Personal information
- Date of birth: 18 March 1998 (age 28)
- Place of birth: Mostar, Bosnia and Herzegovina
- Height: 1.80 m (5 ft 11 in)
- Position: Defensive midfielder

Team information
- Current team: Omonia
- Number: 14

Youth career
- 2009–2014: Grude
- 2014–2017: Široki Brijeg

Senior career*
Years	Team	Apps	(Gls)
2017–2021	Široki Brijeg	72	(8)
2021–2024	Lokomotiva	116	(9)
2024–	Omonia	61	(1)

International career
2019–2020	Bosnia and Herzegovina U21	4	(0)
- * Club domestic league appearances and goals as of 14 June 2026

Mateo Marić (born 18 March 1998) is a Bosnian professional footballer who plays as a defensive midfielder for Cypriot First Division club Omonia. He has represented Bosnia and Herzegovina at U21 level.

== Career ==
In July 2024, Marić joined Cypriot side Omonia.

== Career statistics ==
As of match played 25 June 2025

Appearances and goals by club, season and competition
Club	Season	League			National cup (Note: Includes Bosnian Cup, Croatian Cup, Cypriot Cup)		Continental		Other		Total	
Club	Season	Division	Apps	Goals	Apps	Goals	Apps	Goals	Apps	Goals	Apps	Goals
Široki Brijeg	2016–17	Premijer liga	3	0	—		—		—		3	0
Široki Brijeg	2017–18	Premijer liga	7	1	1	0	—		—		8	1
Široki Brijeg	2018–19	Premijer liga	26	4	6	1	2 (Note: Appearances in UEFA Europa League)	0	—		34	5
Široki Brijeg	2019–20	Premijer liga	17	2	2	0	2	0	—		21	2
Široki Brijeg	2020–21	Premijer liga	19	1	1	0	—		—		20	1
Široki Brijeg	Total		72	8	10	1	4	0	0	0	86	9
Lokomotiva	2020–21	Prva HNL	19	0	—		—		—		19	0
Lokomotiva	2021–22	Prva HNL	32	5	3	0	—		—		35	5
Lokomotiva	2022–23	Prva HNL	31	2	3	0	—		—		34	2
Lokomotiva	2023–24	Prva HNL	34	2	4	0	—		—		38	2
Lokomotiva	Total		116	9	10	0	0	0	0	0	126	9
Omonia	2024–25	Cypriot First Division	31	0	3	0	13 (Note: Appearances in UEFA Conference League)	0	—		47	0
Career total			219	17	23	1	17	0	0	0	259	18

== Honours ==
Omonia

- Cypriot First Division: 2025–26
