= Enis Çokaj =

Albanian footballer

Personal information
- Date of birth: 23 February 1999 (age 27)
- Place of birth: Koplik, Albania
- Height: 1.76 m (5 ft 9 in)
- Position: Midfielder

Team information
- Current team: VfL Bochum
- Number: 6

Youth career
- 2010–2011: Vraka
- 2013–2014: Vllaznia Shkodër
- 2014–2018: Shkendija Tiranë
- 2018–2019: Lokomotiva

Senior career*
Years	Team	Apps	(Gls)
2018–2022	Lokomotiva	94	(4)
2019	→ Laçi (loan)	15	(0)
2022–2026	Panathinaikos	22	(0)
2023	Panathinaikos B	3	(0)
2024	→ Osijek (loan)	15	(0)
2024–2026	→ Levadiakos (loan)	61	(0)
2026–	VfL Bochum	2	(0)

International career^{‡}
2019–2020	Albania U21	5	(1)
2021–	Albania	6	(0)
- * Club domestic league appearances and goals as of 14 August 2026 ‡ National team caps and goals as of 4 September 2025

Enis Çokaj (born 23 February 1999) is an Albanian professional footballer who plays as a midfielder for German 2. Bundesliga club VfL Bochum.

== Club career ==
On 15 September 2022, Lokomotiva Zagreb announced that they had sold Çokaj to Panathinaikos for a fee of €1 million.

On 20 May 2026, Çokaj signed a two-season contract with VfL Bochum in Germany.

== International career ==
Çokaj debuted for the Albania national team in a 5–0 2022 FIFA World Cup qualification win over San Marino on 8 September 2021.

== Career statistics ==
=== Club ===
As of match played 23 August 2026

Appearances and goals by club, season and competition
Club	Season	League			National cup (Note: Includes Albanian Cup, Croatian Football Cup, Greek Football Cup)		Europe		Total	
Club	Season	Division	Apps	Goals	Apps	Goals	Apps	Goals	Apps	Goals
Laçi (loan)	2018–19	Kategoria Superiore	15	0	4	0	—		19	0
Lokomotiva	2019–20	Croatian Football League	30	1	5	2	—		35	3
Lokomotiva	2020–21	Croatian Football League	28	0	1	0	1	0	30	0
Lokomotiva	2021–22	Croatian Football League	28	1	1	0	—		29	1
Lokomotiva	2022–23	Croatian Football League	8	1	—		—		8	1
Lokomotiva	Total		94	3	7	2	1	0	102	5
Panathinaikos	2022–23	Super League Greece	20	0	3	0	—		23	0
Panathinaikos	2023–24	Super League Greece	2	0	0	0	2 (Note: Appearances in UEFA Champions League)	0	4	0
Panathinaikos	Total		22	0	3	0	2	0	27	0
Osijek (loan)	2023–24	Croatian Football League	15	0	1	0	—		16	0
Levadiakos (loan)	2024–25	Super League Greece	30	0	1	0	—		31	0
Levadiakos (loan)	2025–26	Super League Greece	31	0	5	0	—		36	0
Levadiakos (loan)	Total		61	0	6	0	—		67	0
VfL Bochum	2026–27	2. Bundesliga	2	0	1	0	—		3	0
Career total			207	3	22	3	3	0	232	6

=== International ===
As of match played 23 November 2025

Appearances and goals by national team and year
National team	Year	Apps	Goals
Albania	2022	5	0
Albania	2025	1	0
Total		6	0
