= Jon Mersinaj =

Albanian footballer

Personal information
- Date of birth: 8 February 1999 (age 27)
- Place of birth: Tirana, Albania
- Height: 1.83 m (6 ft 0 in)
- Position: Centre back

Team information
- Current team: Slaven Belupo
- Number: 15

Youth career
- 2011–2014: KF Tirana
- 2014–2017: Shkendija Tiranë
- 2017–2018: Lokomotiva

Senior career*
Years	Team	Apps	(Gls)
2018–2024	Lokomotiva	120	(0)
2018–2019	→ Laçi (loan)	26	(0)
2025-	Osijek	27	(1)
2026-	→ Slaven Belupo (loan)	3	(1)

International career^{‡}
2019–	Albania U21	4	(0)
2022–	Albania	1	(0)
- * Club domestic league appearances and goals as of 12 October 2026 ‡ National team caps and goals as of 19:50, 5 July 2022 (UTC)

Jon Mersinaj (born 8 February 1999) is an Albanian professional footballer who plays as a defender for Croatian First Football League club Slaven Belupo, on loan from Osijek and the Albania national team.

== International career ==
Mersinaj debuted with the senior Albania national team in a friendly 0–0 tie with Estonia on 13 June 2022.

== Career statistics ==
=== Club ===
As of match played 21 August 2021

Appearances and goals by club, season and competition
Club	Season	League			National Cup		Continental		Total	
Club	Season	Division	Apps	Goals	Apps	Goals	Apps	Goals	Apps	Goals
Lokomotiva	2019–20	Prva HNL	25	0	3	0	1 (Note: Appearance(s) in UEFA Europa League)	0	29	0
Lokomotiva	2020–21	Prva HNL	3	0	0	0	0	0	3	0
Lokomotiva	Total		28	0	3	0	1	0	32	0
Laçi (loan)	2018–19	Kategoria Superiore	26	0	4	2	0	0	30	2
Career total			54	0	7	2	1	0	62	2
