= Albion Marku =

Albanian footballer

Personal information
- Full name: Albion Marku
- Date of birth: 14 October 2000 (age 26)
- Place of birth: Rrëshen, Mirditë, Albania
- Height: 1.83 m (6 ft 0 in)
- Position: Central midfielder

Team information
- Current team: Partizani Tirana
- Number: 28

Youth career
- 2014–2015: Shënkolli
- 2015: Kukësi
- 2015–2016: Mirdita
- 2016: AF Brians
- 2016–2019: Shkëndija

Senior career*
Years	Team	Apps	(Gls)
2019–2022	Lokomotiva	1	(0)
2020–2021	→ Laçi (loan)	41	(2)
2021–2022	→ Partizani Tirana (loan)	33	(0)
2022–2024	Dinamo Tirana	32	(0)
2022–2023	→ Teuta (loan)	34	(2)
2024–2025	Győr	20	(1)
2025–	Partizani Tirana	14	(0)

International career^{‡}
2022–	Albania	1	(0)
- * Club domestic league appearances and goals as of 6 March 2026 ‡ National team caps and goals as of 17 October 2023

Albion Marku (born 14 October 2000) is an Albanian professional footballer who currently plays as a central midfielder for Partizani Tirana.
