= 2013 UEFA European Under-21 Championship qualification Group 2 =

Football tournament qualification stage

The teams competing in Group 2 of the 2013 UEFA European Under-21 Championship qualifying competition were Finland, Lithuania, Malta, Slovenia, Sweden and Ukraine.

== Standings ==
Pos	Team	Pld	W	D	L	GF	GA	GD	Pts	Qualification	(Sweden)	(Slovenia)	(Ukraine)	(Finland)	(Lithuania)	(Malta)
1	Sweden	10	7	1	2	18	10	+8	22	Play-offs	—	1–1	2–1	3–0	4–0	4–0
2	Slovenia	10	6	2	2	15	8	+7	20		2–1	—	2–0	1–1	2–0	2–1
3	Ukraine	10	5	2	3	21	10	+11	17		6–0	2–0	—	1–1	2–0	5–1
4	Finland	10	3	3	4	12	14	−2	12		0–1	1–0	1–2	—	3–4	0–0
5	Lithuania	10	3	0	7	9	18	−9	9		0–1	0–1	1–0	1–3	—	1–2
6	Malta	10	1	2	7	8	23	−15	5		0–1	1–4	2–2	1–2	0–2	—

== Results and fixtures ==
3 June 2011
17:00

Lithuania	0–1	Slovenia
	Report	Kampl 88'

Savivaldybė Stadium, Šiauliai
Referee: Roman Hrubes (Czech Republic)
3 June 2011
18:00

Finland	0–0	Malta
	Report

Tehtaan kenttä, Valkeakoski
Referee: Sergey Tsinkevich (Belarus)

7 June 2011
17:00

Lithuania	1–2	Malta
Miškinis 42'	Report	Vella 58' (pen.); R. Muscat 60'

Savivaldybė Stadium, Šiauliai
Referee: Petur Reinert (Faroe Islands)

10 August 2011
18:00

Finland	1–0	Slovenia
Dalla Valle 10' (pen.)	Report

Porin Stadion, Pori
Referee: Eli Hacmon (Israel)

1 September 2011
18:00

Lithuania	0–1	Sweden
	Report	Çelik 89'

Sūduva Stadium, Marijampolė
Referee: Nikolai Yordanov (Bulgaria)
1 September 2011
19:00

Malta	1–4	Slovenia
Z. Muscat 79'	Report	Berić 32'; Rep 45+2'; Lazarević 57'; Jelenič 87'

Hibernians Ground, Paola
Referee: Artyom Kuchin (Kazakhstan)

5 September 2011
19:00

Sweden	4–0	Lithuania
Guidetti 22' (pen.); Jönsson 57', 86'; Armenteros 82'	Report

Guldfågeln Arena, Kalmar
Referee: Ján Valášek (Slovakia)
6 September 2011
16:00

Malta	1–2	Finland
Vella 80'	Report	Dalla Valle 10'; Riski 44'

Hibernians Ground, Paola
Referee: Neil Doyle (Republic of Ireland)
6 September 2011
16:30

Slovenia	2–0	Ukraine
Lazarević 56'; Jelenič 67'	Report

Ptuj City Stadium, Ptuj
Referee: Sandor Szabo (Hungary)

6 October 2011
19:20

Sweden	1–1	Slovenia
Milošević 16'	Report	Berić 81'

Vångavallen, Trelleborg
Referee: Harald Lechner (Austria)
7 October 2011
18:00

Malta	2–2	Ukraine
Vella 11'; R. Muscat 90+4'	Report	Bezus 10', 13'

Gozo Stadium, Gozo
Referee: Stavros Tritsonis (Greece)

10 October 2011
18:00

Finland	0–1	Sweden
	Report	Hamad 37'

Tehtaan kenttä, Valkeakoski
Referee: Mihaly Fabian (Hungary)
11 October 2011
15:00

Malta	0–2	Lithuania
	Report	Dapkus 26'; Žulpa 59'

Gozo Stadium, Gozo
Referee: Vlado Glođović (Serbia)

10 November 2011
18:00

Slovenia	2–0	Lithuania
Berić 23'; Lazarević 37'	Report

Nova Gorica Sports Park, Nova Gorica
Referee: Lasha Silagava (Georgia)
11 November 2011
17:00

Ukraine	1–1	Finland
Budkivskiy 76'	Report	Lähde 5'

Sports Complex, Sevastopol
Referee: René Eisner (Austria)

15 November 2011
17:00

Ukraine	2–0	Lithuania
Rybalka 45'; Shakhov 74'	Report

Sports Complex, Sevastopol
Referee: Anatoliy Vishnichenko (Kazakhstan)
15 November 2011
19:00

Malta	0–1	Sweden
	Report	Hamad 36'

Hibernians Ground, Paola
Referee: Dawid Piasecki (Poland)

31 May 2012
19:30

Ukraine	6–0	Sweden
Budkivskiy 17', 32'; Bohdanov 19'; Shakhov 75', 84'; Partsvaniya 89'	Report

Obolon Arena, Kyiv
Referee: Kristo Tohver (Estonia)
1 June 2012
19:00

Slovenia	2–1	Malta
Lazarević 32'; Podlogar 90+4'	Report	Vella 77'

Lendava Sports Park, Lendava
Referee: Nikolai Yordanov (Bulgaria)

4 June 2012
18:00

Lithuania	1–0	Ukraine
Eliošius 3'	Report

S. Darius and S. Girėnas Stadium, Kaunas
Referee: Thorvaldur Árnason (Iceland)
5 June 2012
17:30

Slovenia	1–1	Finland
Maruško 14'	Report	Lahti 29'

Ptuj City Stadium, Ptuj
Referee: Marius Avram (Romania)
6 June 2012
19:15

Sweden	4–0	Malta
Çelik 3'; Ishak 20', 90+2'; Ajdarević 48' (pen.)	Report

Örjans Vall, Halmstad
Referee: Domagoj Vučkov (Croatia)

9 June 2012
15:00

Finland	1–2	Ukraine
Pohjanpalo 87'	Report	Bezus 39'; Budkivskiy 70'

Lahden Stadion, Lahti
Referee: Alain Bieri (Switzerland)

13 June 2012
18:00

Sweden	3–0	Finland
Ishak 21', 74'; Çelik 25'	Report

Guldfågeln Arena, Kalmar
Referee: Miroslav Zelinka (Czech Republic)

15 August 2012
17:00

Finland	3–4	Lithuania
Žulpa 4' (o.g.); Dalla Valle 23'; Sumusalo 39'	Report	Nakrošius 19'; Novikovas 64'; Vilkaitis 67'; Paulius 90+2'

Veritas Stadion, Turku
Referee: Arnold Hunter (Northern Ireland)
15 August 2012
17:30

Ukraine	2–0	Slovenia
Korkishko 16'; Rybalka 42' (pen.)	Report

Obolon Arena, Kyiv
Referee: Michael Oliver (England)

6 September 2012
19:30

Ukraine	5–1	Malta
Rybalka 26', 47', 59'; Korkishko 55'; Hrechyshkin 87'	Report	Vella 21'

Obolon Arena, Kyiv
Referee: Orel Grinfeld (Israel)
6 September 2012
21:00

Slovenia	2–1	Sweden
Berić 44'; Lazarević 82' (pen.)	Report	Johansson 61'

Ljudski vrt, Maribor
Referee: Felix Zwayer (Germany)

10 September 2012
19:15

Lithuania	1–3	Finland
Vilkaitis 13'	Report	Väyrynen 49'; Mäntylä 63'; Forsell 76'

Sūduva Stadium, Marijampolė
Referee: Danilo Grujić (Serbia)
10 September 2012
19:15

Sweden	2–1	Ukraine
Ajdarević 5'; Ishak 7'	Report	Bohdanov 82'

Guldfågeln Arena, Kalmar
Referee: Danny Makkelie (Netherlands)

== Goalscorers ==
5 goals

- (Malta) Terence Vella
- (Slovenia) Dejan Lazarević
- (Sweden) Mikael Ishak
- (Ukraine) Serhiy Rybalka

4 goals

- (Slovenia) Robert Berić
- (Ukraine) Pylyp Budkivskiy

3 goals

- (Finland) Lauri Dalla Valle
- (Sweden) Mervan Çelik
- (Ukraine) Roman Bezus
- (Ukraine) Yevhen Shakhov

2 goals

- (Lithuania) Aurimas Vilkaitis
- (Malta) Rowen Muscat
- (Slovenia) Enej Jelenič
- (Sweden) Astrit Ajdarević
- (Sweden) Jiloan Hamad
- (Sweden) Rasmus Jönsson
- (Ukraine) Andriy Bohdanov
- (Ukraine) Dmytro Korkishko

1 goal

- (Finland) Petteri Forsell
- (Finland) Juho Lähde
- (Finland) Timi Lahti
- (Finland) Tero Mäntylä
- (Finland) Joel Pohjanpalo
- (Finland) Roope Riski
- (Finland) Mikko Sumusalo
- (Finland) Tim Väyrynen
- (Lithuania) Martynas Dapkus
- (Lithuania) Tadas Eliošius
- (Lithuania) Marius Miškinis
- (Lithuania) Donatas Nakrošius
- (Lithuania) Arvydas Novikovas
- (Lithuania) Simonas Paulius
- (Lithuania) Artūras Žulpa
- (Malta) Zach Muscat
- (Slovenia) Kevin Kampl
- (Slovenia) Matic Maruško
- (Slovenia) Matej Podlogar
- (Slovenia) Rajko Rep
- (Sweden) Samuel Armenteros
- (Sweden) John Guidetti
- (Sweden) Jakob Johansson
- (Sweden) Alexander Milošević
- (Ukraine) Dmytro Hrechyshkin
- (Ukraine) Temur Partsvaniya

1 own goal

- (Lithuania) Artūras Žulpa (playing against Finland)
