= 2027 UEFA European Under-21 Championship qualification Group H =

Football tournament qualification stage

Group H of the 2027 UEFA European Under-21 Championship qualifying competition consists of five teams: Ukraine, Croatia, Hungary, Turkey, and Lithuania. The composition of the nine groups in the qualifying group stage was decided by the draw held on 6 February 2025 at the UEFA headquarters in Nyon, Switzerland, with the teams seeded according to their coefficient ranking.

== Standings ==
Pos	Team	Pld	W	D	L	GF	GA	GD	Pts	Qualification	Croatia	Turkey	Ukraine	Hungary	Lithuania
1	Croatia	8	6	1	1	15	3	+12	19	Final tournament	—	3–0	1–0	3–1	4–0
2	Turkey	8	3	4	1	9	8	+1	13	Play-offs	1–1	—	1–0	0–0	2–0
3	Ukraine	8	3	3	2	13	9	+4	12		1–0	2–2	—	3–3	1–1
4	Hungary	8	1	4	3	9	13	−4	7		0–2	1–1	1–2	—	2–1
5	Lithuania	8	0	2	6	4	17	−13	2		0–1	1–2	0–4	1–1	—

Source: UEFA
Rules for classification: Tiebreakers

== Matches ==
Times are CET/CEST, (Note: CEST (UTC+2) for matches until 26 October 2025 and from 29 March 2026 (matchday 1–3 and 7–10), and CET (UTC+1) for matches from 26 October 2025 to 29 March 2026 (matchday 4–6).) as listed by UEFA (local times, if different, are in parentheses).

5 September 2025
18:00 (19:00 UTC+3)

Lithuania	0–4	Ukraine
	Report	Krevsun 69'; Korniychuk 73'; Synchuk 77' (pen.); Hadzhyiev 90+4'

LSC Druskininkai Stadium, Druskininkai
Attendance: 374
Referee: Daniel Higraff (Norway)

9 September 2025
18:00 (19:00 UTC+3)

Lithuania	1–1	Hungary
Audinis 90+2'	Report	Tuboly 9' (pen.)

LSC Druskininkai Stadium, Druskininkai
Attendance: 223
Referee: Joni Hyytiä (Finland)
9 September 2025
19:00 (20:00 UTC+3)

Turkey	1–1	Croatia
Güreler 62'	Report	Soticek 65'

Şenol Güneş Sports Complex, Trabzon
Attendance: 4,875
Referee: Bulat Sariyev (Kazakhstan)

10 October 2025
18:00

Ukraine	3–3	Hungary
Stepanov 8'; Matkevych 75'; Krupskyi 85'	Report	Tuboly 37' (pen.); Molnár 60'; Fenyő 80'

Fazanerija City Stadium, Murska Sobota (Slovenia) (Note: Due to the Russian invasion of Ukraine, Ukraine are required to play their home matches at neutral venues until further notice.)
Attendance: 352
Referee: Oscar Johnson (Sweden)
10 October 2025
19:00 (20:00 UTC+3)

Turkey	2–0	Lithuania
Önal 26'; İlkhan 84'	Report

Sakarya Atatürk Stadium, Adapazarı
Attendance: 8,554
Referee: Milos Boskovic (Montenegro)

14 October 2025
18:00

Hungary	1–1	Turkey
Vancsa 14'	Report	Kılıçsoy 6'

Hidegkuti Nándor Stadion, Budapest
Attendance: 1,713
Referee: Jasper Vergoote (Belgium)
14 October 2025
18:00

Croatia	1–0	Ukraine
Grgić 53'	Report

Stadion Radnik, Velika Gorica
Attendance: 1,247
Referee: Lothar D'hondt (Belgium)

13 November 2025
17:00

Croatia	4–0	Lithuania
Krivak 27'; Zvonarek 73'; Grgić 82', 90+4'	Report

Stadion Radnik, Velika Gorica
Attendance: 471
Referee: Kristoffer Hagenes (Norway)
14 November 2025
18:00 (20:00 UTC+3)

Turkey	1–0	Ukraine
İlkhan 73'	Report

Recep Tayyip Erdoğan Stadium, Istanbul
Attendance: 2,586
Referee: Georgi Ginchev (Bulgaria)

18 November 2025
17:00 (18:00 UTC+2)

Lithuania	1–2	Turkey
Šluta 75'	Report	Habeşoğlu 2', 77'

LSC Druskininkai Stadium, Druskininkai
Attendance: 145
Referee: Christian-Petru Ciochirca (Austria)
18 November 2025
20:00

Hungary	0–2	Croatia
	Report	Grgić 17'; Tunjić 90'

Hidegkuti Nándor Stadion, Budapest
Attendance: 813
Referee: Joey Kooij (Netherlands)

27 March 2026
18:00

Ukraine	1–1	Lithuania
Krevsun 61'	Report	Steponavičius 70'

Košická Futbalová Aréna, Košice (Slovakia)
Attendance: 1,505
Referee: Roman Jitari (Moldova)

31 March 2026
16:30

Hungary	1–2	Ukraine
Dénes 90+5'	Report	Pyshchur 26'; Synchuk 68'

Hidegkuti Nándor Stadion, Budapest
Attendance: 913
Referee: Jakob Semler (Austria)
31 March 2026
17:30

Croatia	3–0	Turkey
Krivak 38'; Jagušić 54'; Mlačić 90+4'	Report

Opus Arena, Osijek
Attendance: 7,325
Referee: Alessandro Dudic (Switzerland)

26 September 2026
17:00

Croatia	3−1	Hungary
Jagušić 25', 60', 84'	Report	Tuboly 50' (pen.)

Stadion Varteks, Varaždin
Attendance: 857
Referee: Karl Koppel (Estonia)
26 September 2026
18:00

Ukraine	2–2	Turkey
Krevsun 38'; Hadzhyiev 82'	Report	İlkhan 12'; Habeşoğlu 33'

Diósgyőri Stadion, Miskolc (Hungary)
Attendance: 120
Referee: David Šmajc (Slovenia)

1 October 2026
19:00

Hungary	2–1	Lithuania
Tuboly 30' (pen.); Dénes 75'	Report	Grudzinskas 16'

Hidegkuti Nándor Stadion, Budapest
Attendance: 1,113
Referee: Bálint Kišš (Slovakia)
2 October 2026
18:00

Ukraine	1–0	Croatia
Pyshchur 9'	Report

Diósgyőri Stadion, Miskolc (Hungary)
Attendance: 360
Referee: David Rafael Oliveira da Silva (Portugal)

6 October 2026
19:00 (20:00 UTC+3)

Lithuania	0–1	Croatia
	Report	Canjuga 27' (pen.)

LSC Druskininkai Stadium, Druskininkai
Attendance: 245
Referee: Aaron Wyn Jones (Wales)
6 October 2026
19:00 (20:00 UTC+3)

Turkey	0–0	Hungary
	Report

Başakşehir Fatih Terim Stadium, Istanbul
Attendance: 320
Referee: Amine Kourgheli (Belarus)

== Goalscorers ==
There were 50 goals scored in 20 matches, for an average of 2.5 goals per match.

4 goals

- (Croatia national under-21 football team) Leon Grgić
- (Croatia national under-21 football team) Adriano Jagušić
- (Hungary national under-21 football team) Máté Tuboly

3 goals

- (Turkey national under-21 football team) Ali Habeşoğlu
- (Turkey national under-21 football team) Emirhan Ilkhan
- (Ukraine national under-21 football team) Danylo Krevsun

2 goals

- (Croatia national under-21 football team) Fabijan Krivak
- (Hungary national under-21 football team) Csanád Dénes
- (Ukraine national under-21 football team) Ramik Hadzhyiev
- (Ukraine national under-21 football team) Oleksandr Pyshchur
- (Ukraine national under-21 football team) Hennadiy Synchuk

1 goal

- (Croatia national under-21 football team) Ivan Canjuga
- (Croatia national under-21 football team) Branimir Mlačić
- (Croatia national under-21 football team) Luka Tunjić
- (Croatia national under-21 football team) Lovro Zvonarek
- (Hungary national under-21 football team) Noah Fenyő
- (Hungary national under-21 football team) Ádin Molnár
- (Hungary national under-21 football team) Zalán Vancsa
- (Lithuania national under-21 football team) Nojus Audinis
- (Lithuania national under-21 football team) Dovas Grudzinskas
- (Lithuania national under-21 football team) Domantas Šluta
- (Lithuania national under-21 football team) Faustas Steponavičius
- (Turkey national under-21 football team) Hamza Güreler
- (Turkey national under-21 football team) Semih Kılıçsoy
- (Turkey national under-21 football team) Basar Önal
- (Ukraine national under-21 football team) Serhiy Korniychuk
- (Ukraine national under-21 football team) Illya Krupskyi
- (Ukraine national under-21 football team) Andriy Matkevych
- (Ukraine national under-21 football team) Artem Stepanov

1 own goal

- (Turkey national under-21 football team) Yasin Ozcan (against Croatia)
