= 2009 UEFA European Under-21 Championship qualification Group 2 =

The teams competing in group 2 of the 2009 UEFA European Under-21 Championships qualifying competition are Armenia, Czech Republic, Liechtenstein, Turkey and Ukraine.

== Standings ==
Team	Pld	W	D	L	GF	GA	GD	Pts
Turkey	8	6	1	1	18	6	+12	19
Ukraine	8	5	0	3	16	7	+9	15
Czech Republic	8	4	2	2	19	5	+14	14
Armenia	8	3	1	4	8	16	−8	10
Liechtenstein	8	0	0	8	4	31	−27	0

Key: Pts Points, Pld Matches played, W Won, D Drawn, L Lost, GF Goals for, GA Goals against, GD Goal Difference

== Matches ==
31 May 2007
20:00 UTC+5

Armenia	1 – 0	Liechtenstein
Muradyan 84'	Report

Republican, Yerevan
Referee: Draženko Kovačić (Croatia)
1 June 2007
19:00 UTC+3

Ukraine	1 – 2	Turkey
Fomin 5'	Report	Chyzhov 50' (o.g.); Şahin 85'

Lobanovsky Dynamo Stadium, Kyiv
Referee: Bas Nijhuis (Netherlands)

6 June 2007
20:00 UTC+3

Ukraine	4 – 0	Armenia
Kravchenko 12'; Oliynyk 61'; Hladkyy 67'; Priyomov 86'	Report

Metalist Stadium, Kharkiv
Referee: Hannes Kaasik (Estonia)

8 September 2007
17:00 UTC+5

Armenia	1 – 1	Czech Republic
Petrosyan 45+2'	Report	Pekhart 46'

Republican, Yerevan
Referee: Matej Jug (Slovenia)
8 September 2007
17:00 UTC+2

Liechtenstein	2 – 3	Turkey
Christen 6'; Hasler 59'	Report	Keleş 14', 90+5'; Bahtiyaroğlu 29'

Rheinpark, Vaduz
Referee: Adrian D. Casha (Malta)

11 September 2007
17:00 UTC+2

Czech Republic	8 – 0	Liechtenstein
Fillo 4'; Pekhart 12', 49'; Smejkal 40', 45', 70'; Dockal 54', 85'	Report

Na Chvalech, Horni Pocernice
Referee: Vusal Aliyev (Azerbaijan)
12 September 2007
17:00 UTC+5

Armenia	0 – 2	Ukraine
	Report	Yaroshenko 39'; Oliynyk 65' (pen.)

Republican, Yerevan
Referee: Christoforos Zografos (Greece)

14 October 2007
15:00 UTC+2

Liechtenstein	0 – 4	Czech Republic
	Report	Mazuch 35'; Dockal 39'; Smejkal 67'; Pekhart 77' (pen.)

Sportpark Eschen-Mauren, Eschen
Referee: Goran Spirkoski (Macedonia)
14 October 2007
17:00 UTC+3

Turkey	2 – 0	Ukraine
Şahin 62'; Erdinç 65'	Report

Şükrü Saracoğlu Stadium, Istanbul
Referee: Philippe Kalt (France)

17 October 2007
15:00 UTC+2

Liechtenstein	1 – 3	Ukraine
Hasler 75'	Report	Antonov 45', 65'; Priyomov 90+3'

Sportpark Eschen-Mauren, Eschen
Referee: Stanislav Todorov (Bulgaria)
17 October 2007
16:30 UTC+2

Czech Republic	3 – 0	Armenia
Strestik 2'; Jeslínek 18'; Pekhart 29'	Report

Stadion Františka Kloze, Kladno
Referee: Dejan Filipović (Serbia)

17 November 2007
16:00 UTC+2

Czech Republic	1 – 1	Turkey
Strestik 17'	Report	Parlak 37'

Stadion Střelnice, Jablonec nad Nisou
Referee: Martin Atkinson (England)
17 November 2007
17:00 UTC+3

Ukraine	5 – 0	Liechtenstein
Oliynyk 26'; Lopa 30'; Yaroshenko 39'; Hladkyy 41'; Antonov 54'	Report

Slavutych Arena, Zaporizhia
Referee: Lasha Silagava (Georgia)

20 November 2007
14:30 UTC+2

Liechtenstein	1 – 4	Armenia
Buchel 70'	Report	Nranyan 13'; Andrikyan 25'; Mkhitaryan 51'; Chilingaryan 59'

Sportpark Eschen-Mauren, Eschen
Referee: Rusmir Mrkovic (Bosnia and Herzegovina)
21 November 2007
19:00 UTC+3

Ukraine	0 – 2	Czech Republic
	Report	Jeslínek 73'; Rajtoral 83'

Slavutych Arena, Zaporizhia
Referee: Marijo Strahonja (Croatia)

26 March 2008
17:00 UTC+3

Turkey	3 – 0	Liechtenstein
Parlak 45'; Şahin 58'; Yelen 85'	Report

5 Ocak, Adana
Referee: Akmalkhan Kaolmatov (Kazakhstan)

20 August 2008
21:00 UTC+5

Armenia	2 – 1	Turkey
Mkrtchyan 89'; Mkhitaryan 90+3'	Report	Durak 66'

Hrazdan Stadium, Yerevan
Referee: Michael Svendsen (Denmark)

6 September 2008
21:30 UTC+3

Turkey	2 – 0	Czech Republic
Karabulut 63', 85'	Report

Bursa Atatürk Stadium, Bursa
Referee: István Vad (Hungary)

9 September 2008
19:00 UTC+2

Czech Republic	0 – 1	Ukraine
	Report	Lysenko 89'

Městský fotbalový stadion, Uherské Hradiště
Referee: Jouni Hietala (Finland)
9 September 2008
20:00 UTC+3

Turkey	4 – 0	Armenia
Karadeniz 26', 45'; Güngör 34'; Hurmacı 56'	Report

Ali Sami Yen Stadium, Istanbul
Referee: Babak Rafati (Germany)

== Goalscorers ==
Pos	Player	Country	Goals
1	Tomáš Pekhart	Czech Republic	5
2	Michal Smejkal	Czech Republic	4
3	Borek Dockal	Czech Republic	3
3	Nuri Şahin	Turkey	3
3	Denys Oliynyk	Ukraine	3
3	Oleksiy Antonov	Ukraine	3
7	Henrik Mkhitaryan	Armenia	2
7	Jiří Jeslínek	Czech Republic	2
7	Marek Strestik	Czech Republic	2
7	David Hasler	Liechtenstein	2
7	Batuhan Karadeniz	Turkey	2
7	Aydın Karabulut	Turkey	2
7	Ergin Keleş	Turkey	2
7	İlhan Parlak	Turkey	2
7	Oleksandr Hladkyy	Ukraine	2
7	Volodymyr Pryyomov	Ukraine	2
7	Kostyantyn Yaroshenko	Ukraine	2

1 goal

- Armenia: Artak Andrikyan, Hayk Chilingaryan, Karlen Mkrtchyan, Semion Muradyan, Gevorg Nranyan, Vardan Petrosyan
- Czech Republic: Martin Fillo, Ondřej Mazuch, František Rajtoral
- Liechtenstein: Stefan Buchel, Mathias Christen
- Turkey: Ediz Bahtiyaroğlu, Abdullah Durak, Mevlüt Erdinç, Zafer Yelen, Eren Güngör, Özer Hurmacı
- Ukraine: Ruslan Fomin, Konstantyn Kravchenko, Dmytro Lopa, Volodymyr Lysenko

Own goals

- Ukraine: Oleksandr Chyzhov
