= Ukraine national under-21 football team =

Sports team

Ukraine Under-21
- Nickname: Молодіжка (Young men)
- Association: Ukrainian Association of Football
- Head coach: Dmytro Mykhailenko
- Captain: Maksym Melnychenko
- Most caps: Arseniy Batahov (39)
- Top scorer: Pylyp Budkivskyi (18)
- Home stadium: Valeriy Lobanovskyi Dynamo Stadium
First colours	Second colours

First international
- Ukraine 0–0 Belarus; Ternopil, Ukraine; 28 October 1992

Biggest win
- Ukraine 8–0 Armenia; Kyiv, Ukraine; 13 October 1998

Biggest defeat
- France 4–0 Ukraine; Paris, France; 26 March 1999 Note: Records for competitive matches only.

Olympic Games
- Appearances: 1 (first in 2024)
- Best result: Group stage (2024)

UEFA U-21 Championship
- Appearances: 4 (first in 2006)
- Best result: Runners-up (2006)

The Ukraine national under-21 football team is also known as Youth [football] team of Ukraine (Ukrainian: Молодіжна збірна України) is one of junior national football teams of Ukraine for participation in under-21 international competitions. The team is managed by the Ukrainian Association of Football staff, committee of national teams. The team participates in qualifications to the Olympic competitions and the continental (UEFA) U-21 competitions.

Their first game the team played was on 28 October 1992. Its first competition the team entered in 1994 the qualification round for the 1996 European Under-21 Championship. The team has qualified for a tournament twice. The under-21s not only qualified for the 2006 European Under-21 Championship, but also reached the final, where they lost to Netherlands on 4 June 2006 by 3–0. The under-21s also qualified to the 2011 UEFA European Under-21 Championship that was held in Denmark.

== History ==
Its first game under national flag the team played on 28 October 1992 by hosting Belarus national under-21 football team in a friendly game in Ternopil (Ternopil City Stadium). The game ended in scoreless tie and was attended by 4,000 people. The initial squad consisted of following players Sergei Aleksandrov, Dmytro Parfenov, Serhiy Fedorov, Oleksandr Koval, Vladyslav Vashchuk, Vitaliy Kosovskyi, Ihor Luchkevych, Serhiy Onopko, Vladimir Lebed, Hennadiy Moroz, Vitaliy Pushkutsa, Kostyantyn Pinchuk, Oleg Solovyov, Ruslan Romanchuk, Oleksandr Karabuta. Later two out of the squad Lebed and Aleksandrov continued to play for Russian national teams.

In August 1993, the Ukraine youth squad took part in its first tournament where it contested few teams outside of Europe. Its first competitive tournament became the Youth Euro 1996 where it was eliminated in qualification group. Its first game Ukraine U-21 played at home against its opponents from Lithuania on 6 September 1994.

It took Ukraine another 10 years to finally qualify to the tournament final when in 2006 it almost won the tournament losing in the final game to Netherlands which earned its first title instead.

== Tournaments ==
=== Summer Olympics record ===
As U-23 team

Rules

- 1996–present: u-23 national teams (with three 'no age limit' players allowed, after an agreement between FIFA and OIC)

Note

- No tournament held in 1932
- 1900 to 1912 as Part of Russian Empire,1922 to 1988 as Part of Soviet Union,1992 as member Unified Team at the 1992 Summer Olympics

Olympic Games record
Year	Host	Round	Pos.	Pld.	W	D	L	GF	GA
1900	(French Third Republic) Paris	see Note							
1904	(United States) St. Louis	see Note							
1908	(United Kingdom of Great Britain and Ireland) London	see Note							
1912	(Sweden) Stockholm	see Note							
1920	(Belgium) Antwerp	see Note							
1924	(France) Paris	see Note							
1928	(Netherlands) Amsterdam	see Note							
1936	(Germany) Berlin	see Note							
1948	(United Kingdom) London	see Note							
1952	(Finland) Helsinki	see Note							
1956	(Australia) Melbourne	see Note							
1960	(Italy) Rome	see Note							
1964	(Japan) Tokyo	see Note							
1968	Mexico City	see Note							
1972	(West Germany) Munich	see Note							
1976	(Canada) Montreal	see Note							
1980	(Soviet Union) Moscow	see Note							
1984	(United States) Los Angeles	see Note							
1988	(South Korea) Seoul	see Note							
1992	(Spain) Barcelona	see Note							
1996	(United States) Atlanta	Did not qualify							
2000	(Australia) Sydney	Did not qualify							
2004	(Greece) Athens	Did not qualify							
2008	(China) Beijing	Did not qualify							
2012	(United Kingdom) London	Did not qualify							
2016	(Brazil) Rio de Janeiro	Did not qualify							
2020	(Japan) Tokyo	Did not qualify							
2024	(France) Paris	Group stage	9th	3	1	0	2	3	5
2028	(United States) Los Angeles	Did not qualify							
2032	(Australia) Brisbane	To be determined							
Total:1/30		Group stage	9th	3	1	0	2	3	5

*Denotes draws including knockout matches decided via penalty shoot-out.
**Since 1968, Spain has sent its under-23 national team.

=== UEFA U-21 Championship ===
Since 1984, it is an official U-21 European championship. Since 1992, the tournament doubles as qualifying competition for the Olympic Games every four years.

- 1994: Did not enter.
- 1996: Did not qualify. Finished 2nd of 6 in qualification group.
- 1998: Did not qualify. Finished 2nd of 5 in qualification group.
- 2000: Did not qualify. Finished 3rd of 5 in qualification group.
- 2002: Did not qualify. Finished 1st of 5 in qualification group. Lost qualification play-off to Switzerland.
- 2004: Did not qualify. Finished 3rd of 6 in qualification group.
- 2006: Runner-up. Finished 2nd of 7 in qualification group. Won qualification play-off over Belgium.
- 2007: Did not qualify. Finished 2nd of 3 in qualification group.
- 2009: Did not qualify. Finished 2nd of 5 in qualification group.
- 2011: Group Stage. Finished 1st of 5 in qualification group. Won qualification play-off over Netherlands
- 2013: Did not qualify. Finished 3rd of 6 in qualification group.
- 2015: Did not qualify. Finished 2nd of 5 in qualification group. Lost qualification play-off to Germany.
- 2017: Did not qualify. Finished 4th of 6 in qualification group.
- 2019: Did not qualify. Finished 3rd of 6 in qualification group.
- 2021: Did not qualify. Finished 3rd of 6 in qualification group.
- 2023: Qualified. Finished 2nd of 6 in qualification group. Won qualification play-off over Slovakia.
- 2025: Qualified. Finished 2nd of 6 in qualification group.
- 2027: Did not qualify.

==== UEFA U-21 European Championship record ====
UEFA European Under-21 Championship									UEFA European Under-21 Championship Qualification					
Year	Round	Position	Pld	W	D	L	GF	GA	Pld	W	D	L	GF	GA
1960–1992	Part of Soviet Union								Part of Soviet Union					
(France) 1994	Did not enter								Did not enter					
(Spain) 1996	Did not qualify								10	6	2	2	24	12
(Romania) 1998	Did not qualify								8	5	1	2	14	4
(Slovakia) 2000	Did not qualify								8	3	2	3	16	12
(Switzerland) 2002	Did not qualify								12	6	1	5	16	17
(Germany) 2004	Did not qualify								8	2	5	1	8	5
(Portugal) 2006	Runner-up	2nd	5	2	1	2	4	6	14	8	2	4	27	11
(Netherlands) 2007	Did not qualify								2	1	0	1	2	4
(Sweden) 2009	Did not qualify								8	5	0	3	16	7
(Denmark) 2011	Group stage	8th	3	0	1	2	1	5	10	5	4	1	16	8
(Israel) 2013	Did not qualify								10	5	2	3	21	10
(Czech Republic) 2015	Did not qualify								10	6	1	3	20	13
(Poland) 2017	Did not qualify								10	4	2	4	14	12
(Italy) (San Marino) 2019	Did not qualify								10	5	2	3	18	12
(Hungary) (Slovenia) 2021	Did not qualify								10	5	1	4	17	11
(Romania) (Georgia (country)) 2023	Semi-Finals	3rd	5	3	1	1	9	8	12	8	2	2	25	14
(Slovakia) 2025	Group stage	9th	3	1	0	2	4	5	10	8	0	2	20	7
(Albania) (Serbia) 2027	Did not qualify								7	2	3	2	12	9
2029	To be determined								To be determined					
Total:4/16	Runner-up	2nd	16	6	3	7	18	24	137	73	25	39	243	143

the years preceding Summer Olympics

=== Important friendlies ===
==== Lobanovsky tournament (2006– ) ====
- Winners (2): 2009, 2019
- Runners-up (4): 2011, 2013, 2015, 2017

==== Commonwealth of Independent States Cup (2012–2014) ====
- Winner (1): 2014
- Runner-up (1): 2013

== Head coaches ==
As of 22 July 2026

Manager	Nation	Ukraine career	Played	Won	Drawn	Lost	GF	GA	Win %	Qualifying cycle	Final tour
Volodymyr Muntian	(Ukraine)	1992–1994	15	8	5	2	25	12	53.33	1996	
Viktor Kolotov	(Ukraine)	1995	7	3	2	2	17	10	42.86	1996	
Oleksandr Ishchenko	(Ukraine)	1996–1997	11	7	2	2	19	6	63.64	1998	
Viktor Kolotov	(Ukraine)	1998–1999	12	6	3	3	32	16	50	2000	
Volodymyr Onyschenko	(Ukraine)	1999–2001	21	9	3	9	23	31	42.86	2000, 2002	
Anatoliy Kroshchenko	(Ukraine)	2002	10	1	6	3	10	12	10	2004	
Pavlo Yakovenko	(Ukraine)	2002–2004	20	8	6	6	24	20	40	2004, 2006	
Hennadiy Lytovchenko	(Ukraine)	2003–2004	2	1	1	0	4	2	50		
Oleksiy Mykhaylichenko	(Ukraine)	2004–2007	41	21	6	14	4	2	51.22	2006, 2007, 2009	2006
Volodymyr Muntian (caretaker)	(Ukraine)	2008	5	0	2	3	2	8	0		
Pavlo Yakovenko	(Ukraine)	2008–2012	70	31	25	14	109	66	44.29	2009, 2011, 2013	2011
Serhiy Kovalets	(Ukraine)	2013–2015	47	26	8	13	94	50	55.32	2013, 2015	
Oleksandr Holovko	(Ukraine)	2015–2018	25	13	7	5	49	34	52	2017, 2019	
Ruslan Rotan	(Ukraine)	2018–2023	47	23	12	12	79	55	48.94	2021, 2023	2023
Unai Melgosa	(Spain)	2023–2026	29	13	5	11	45	38	44.83	2025, 2027	2025
Dmytro Mykhailenko	(Ukraine)	2026–present	0	0	0	0	0	0	-0	2027	

=== Coaching staff ===
Currently approved:

Position	Name
Head coach	(Spain) Unai Melgosa
Assistant coach	(Ukraine) Kyrylo Mazur
Goalkeeping coach	(Ukraine) Vitaliy Reva
Fitness coach	(Ukraine) Andriy Shabalin

== Results and fixtures ==
=== 2025 ===
14 November 2025 U21 Euro 2027 Qualification	Turkey	1–0	Ukraine	Istanbul, Turkey
19:00	İlkhan 73'	Report		Stadium: Recep Tayyip Erdoğan Stadium; Attendance: 2,586; Referee: Georgi Ginchev (Bulgaria)

17 November 2025 Friendly	Albania	2–0	Ukraine	Elbasan
18:00	Rashica 38'; Kote 90+5'	Report		Stadium: Elbasan Arena

=== 2026 ===
27 March 2026 U21 Euro 2027 Qualification	Ukraine	1–1	Lithuania	Košická Futbalová Aréna, Košice (Slovakia)
18:00	Krevsun 61'	Report	Steponavičius 70'	Attendance: 1,505; Referee: Roman Jitari (Moldova)

31 March 2026 U21 Euro 2027 Qualification	Hungary	1–2	Ukraine	Hidegkuti Nándor Stadion, Budapest
16:30	Dénes 90+5'	Report	Pyshchur 26'; Synchuk 68'	Referee: Jakob Semler (Austria)

5 June 2026 Friendly	United States	3–1	Ukraine	Rogaška Slatina Slovenia
19:00	Brandan 28'; Downs 43'; Campbell 57'	Report	Husol 19'	Stadium: Športni center Rogaška Slatina; Referee: Avdihodzic A.

8 June 2026 Friendly	Japan	3–0	Ukraine	Rogaška Slatina Slovenia
16:00	Nwadike 1' 61'; Umeki 8'	Report		Stadium: Športni center Rogaška Slatina

26 September 2026 U21 Euro 2027 Qualification	Ukraine	2–2	Turkey	Diósgyőri Stadion, Miskolc, (Hungary)
18:00	Krevsun 38'; Hadzhyiev 82'	Report	İlkhan 12'; Habeşoğlu 33'	Referee: David Šmajc (Slovenia)

2 October 2026 U21 Euro 2027 Qualification	Ukraine	1–0	Croatia	Miskolc (Hungary)
18:00	Pyshchur 9'	Report		Stadium: Diósgyőri Stadion; Attendance: 360; Referee: David Rafael Oliveira da Silva (Portugal)

5 October 2026 Friendly	Albania	2–2	Ukraine	Eger, Hungary
15:30	Kevin Dodaj 18'; Maksuti 90'		Hlushchenko 55'; Digtyar 56'	Stadium: Szentmarjay Tibor Városi Stadion

12 November 2026 Friendly	Scotland	4–0	Ukraine	San Pedro del Pinatar, Spain
15:00	Miller 23'; MacLeod 44'; Wilson 60'; Stewart 71'			Stadium: Pinatar Arena

17 November 2026 Friendly	Ukraine	0–3	United States	San Pedro del Pinatar, Spain
15:00			Cremaschi 14'; Vázquez 35'; Dills 81'	Stadium: Pinatar Arena; Referee: Joaquín Caballero (Spain)

== Players ==
Players born in 2004 or later are eligible for the U21 Euro 2027 Qualification. Names in bold denote players who have been capped for the senior team. Names in italics denote players who not available for calling up anymore, because of the age limits.

=== Current squad ===
The following players were called up for the friendly matches against United States and Japan on 5 and 8 June 2026; respectively.

Caps and goals correct as of 8 June 2026, after the match against the Japan.

No.	Pos.	Player	Date of birth (age)	Caps	Goals	Club
1	GK	Vladyslav Krapyvtsov	25 June 2005 (age 21)	4	0	(Royal Spanish Football Federation) Girona
12	GK	Illya Popovych	30 November 2005 (age 20)	2	0	(Hungarian Football Federation) Kisvárda
2	DF	Illya Krupskyi	2 October 2004 (age 22)	18	1	(Ukrainian Association of Football) Metalist 1925 Kharkiv
3	DF	Maksym Korobov	6 March 2006 (age 20)	2	0	(Ukrainian Association of Football) Dynamo Kyiv
4	DF	Vladyslav Kysil	14 June 2005 (age 21)	6	0	(Royal Spanish Football Federation) Ponferradina
5	DF	Oleksiy Husiev	16 March 2005 (age 21)	5	0	(Ukrainian Association of Football) Kudrivka
13	DF	Vladyslav Zakharchenko	16 June 2006 (age 20)	6	0	(Ukrainian Association of Football) Dynamo Kyiv
14	DF	Volodymyr Vilivald	23 September 2004 (age 22)	1	0	(Ukrainian Association of Football) Kryvbas Kryvyi Rih
15	DF	Vitaliy Kholod	15 January 2004 (age 22)	4	0	(Ukrainian Association of Football) Karpaty Lviv
22	DF	Serhiy Korniychuk	25 June 2004 (age 22)	7	1	(Ukrainian Association of Football) Veres Rivne
6	MF	Ivan Varfolomeyev	24 March 2004 (age 22)	16	0	(The Football Association) Lincoln City
7	MF	Danylo Krevsun	21 April 2005 (age 21)	7	2	(German Football Association) Borussia Dortmund
11	MF	Anton Tsarenko	17 June 2004 (age 22)	11	0	(Polish Football Association) Lechia Gdańsk
16	MF	Yevheniy Pastukh	19 March 2004 (age 22)	7	0	(Ukrainian Association of Football) LNZ Cherkasy
17	MF	Oleh Fedor	23 July 2004 (age 22)	11	0	(Ukrainian Association of Football) Polissya Zhytomyr
18	MF	Yaroslav Shevchenko	14 September 2006 (age 20)	2	0	(Ukrainian Association of Football) Kryvbas Kryvyi Rih
9	FW	Andriy Matkevych	11 January 2005 (age 21)	6	1	(Ukrainian Association of Football) Epitsentr Kamianets-Podilskyi
10	FW	Timur Tutierov	11 June 2005 (age 21)	5	0	(The Football Association) Exeter City
19	FW	Oleksandr Pyshchur	24 January 2005 (age 21)	6	1	(Royal Spanish Football Federation) Girona
20	FW	Vadym Sydun	10 February 2005 (age 21)	2	0	(Ukrainian Association of Football) Epitsentr Kamianets-Podilskyi
21	FW	Artem Husol	5 January 2006 (age 20)	6	1	(Ukrainian Association of Football) Kolos Kovalivka
79	FW	Ruslan Vydysh	4 July 2006 (age 20)	1	0	(Royal Belgian Football Association) Gent

=== Recent call-ups ===
The following players have been called up for the team within the last 12 months and remain eligible for selection.

Pos.	Player	Date of birth (age)	Caps	Goals	Club	Latest call-up
GK	Ivan Pakholyuk	27 April 2004 (age 22)	1	0	(Ukraine) Kolos Kovalivka	v. Hungary, 31 March 2026
DF	Mykola Oharkov	18 February 2005 (age 21)	3	0	(Ukraine) Oleksandriya	v. Albania, 17 November 2025
DF	**Taras Mykhavko**	30 May 2005 (age 21)	8	1	(Ukraine) Dynamo Kyiv	v. Turkey, 14 November 2025 ^{UKR}
MF	Maksym Melnychenko	12 February 2005 (age 21)	10	0	(Ukraine) Polissya Zhytomyr	v. Hungary, 31 March 2026
MF	Anton Hlushchenko	20 April 2004 (age 22)	4	0	(Ukraine) Kudrivka	v. Hungary, 31 March 2026
MF	Daniil Vashchenko	2 October 2005 (age 21)	1	0	(Ukraine) Oleksandriya	v. Hungary, 31 March 2026
MF	Bohdan Budko	7 January 2006 (age 20)	0	0	(Netherlands) AZ Alkmaar	v. Hungary, 31 March 2026
MF	Artem Slesar	12 December 2004 (age 21)	4	0	(Ukraine) Zorya Luhansk	v. Albania, 17 November 2025
MF	Roman Salenko	18 May 2005 (age 21)	3	0	(Ukraine) Zorya Luhansk	v. Turkey, 14 November 2025 ^{INJ}
FW	Artem Stepanov	10 August 2007 (age 19)	7	1	(Netherlands) Utrecht	v. Hungary, 31 March 2026
FW	Hennadiy Synchuk	10 July 2006 (age 20)	3	2	(Canada) Montréal	v. Hungary, 31 March 2026
FW	Bohdan Redushko	7 January 2007 (age 19)	2	0	(Ukraine) Dynamo Kyiv	v. Hungary, 31 March 2026
Notes: ^{UKR} = Called up to the Ukraine national squad instead.; ^{INJ} = Player withdrew from the squad because of injury.; ^{WD} = Player withdrew from the squad due to non-injury issue.; ^{RES} = Reserves squad – replaces a member of the squad in case of injury/unavailability.

== Player records ==
=== Top goalscorers ===
As of 17 November 2025

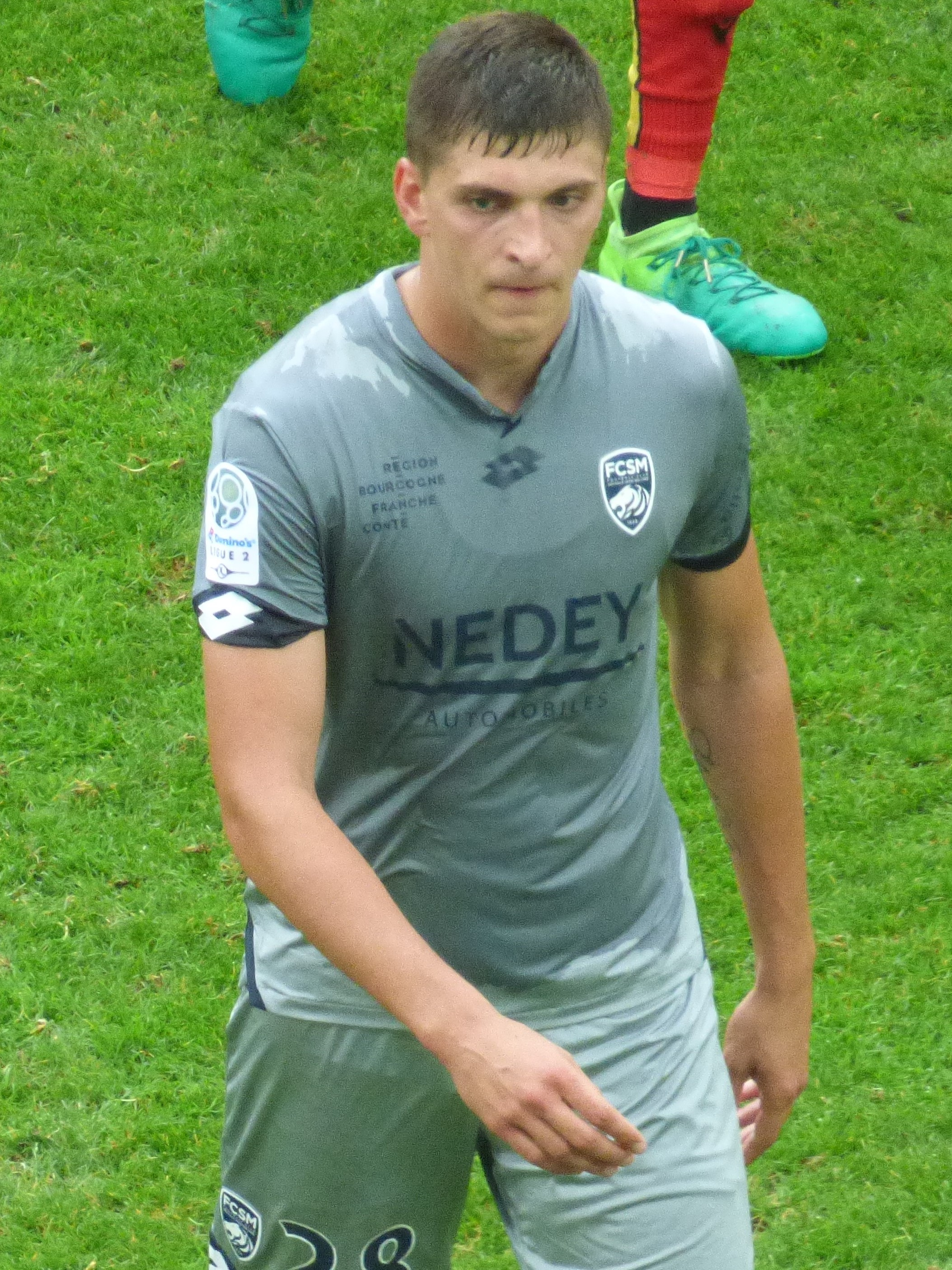
Pylyp Budkivskyi is Ukraine's u21 top scorer with 18 goals.

Rank	Player	Goals	Caps	Average	Period
1	Pylyp Budkivskyi	18	23	0.78	2011–2013
2	Danylo Sikan	9	19	0.47	2019–2023
3	Oleksandr Aliyev	8	30	0.27	2003–2006
3	Bohdan Viunnyk	8	36	0.22	2021–2025
5	Nazariy Rusyn	7	11	0.64	2018–2019
5	Andriy Totovytskyi	7	12	0.58	2013
5	Serhiy Rebrov	7	17	0.41	1993–1995
5	Artem Byesyedin	7	17	0.41	2015–2017
5	Ruslan Fomin	7	20	0.35	2005–2008
5	Oleksiy Byelik	7	29	0.24	2000–2003
5	Artem Milevskyi	7	31	0.23	2003–2006

== Head-to-head record ==
The following table shows Ukraine Under-21s all-time international record, correct as of 29 March 2021.

Key
Positive balance (more wins)
Neutral balance (equal W/L ratio)
Negative balance (more losses)

Against	Confederation	Played	Won	Drawn	Lost	GF	GA	GD
Albania	UEFA	7	6	1	0	17	2	+15
Andorra	UEFA	2	2	0	0	7	0	+7
Armenia	UEFA	10	8	2	0	31	3	+28
Austria	UEFA	3	1	1	1	2	2	+0
Azerbaijan	UEFA	4	2	1	1	6	3	+3
Bahrain	AFC	1	1	0	0	4	3	+1
Belarus	UEFA	14	6	6	2	19	12	+7
Belgium	UEFA	4	2	1	1	8	5	+3
Bulgaria	UEFA	6	2	0	4	10	11	-1
Chile	CONMEBOL	2	2	0	0	3	0	+3
China	AFC	1	1	0	0	2	1	+1
Croatia	UEFA	7	3	2	2	8	7	+1
Czech Republic	UEFA	8	1	1	6	5	13	-8
Cyprus	UEFA	2	1	1	0	4	1	+3
Denmark	UEFA	12	4	4	4	16	17	-1
Egypt	CAF	1	1	0	0	3	1	+2
England	UEFA	6	1	1	4	5	11	-6
Estonia	UEFA	5	3	2	0	13	5	+8
Finland	UEFA	5	2	2	1	5	4	+1
France	UEFA	9	1	5	3	8	14	-6
Georgia	UEFA	11	5	4	2	28	12	+16
Germany	UEFA	6	0	1	5	2	14	-12
Greece	UEFA	8	5	3	0	11	2	+9
Hungary	UEFA	2	1	0	1	3	5	-2
Iceland	UEFA	5	3	0	2	13	10	+3
Iran	AFC	5	2	2	1	10	7	+3
Northern Ireland	UEFA	8	4	3	1	13	6	+7
Israel	UEFA	9	4	4	1	8	7	+1
Italy	UEFA	5	1	0	4	3	6	-3
Kazakhstan	UEFA	4	4	0	0	9	2	+7
South Korea	AFC	1	0	0	1	2	3	-1
Kosovo	UEFA	1	1	0	0	2	0	+2
Kyrgyzstan	AFC	2	2	0	0	6	0	+6
Latvia	UEFA	8	6	2	0	19	6	+13
Liechtenstein	UEFA	4	4	0	0	16	3	+13
Lithuania	UEFA	11	6	3	2	23	14	+9
Libya	CAF	1	0	1	0	0	0	+0
Luxembourg	UEFA	2	2	0	0	4	0	+4
North Macedonia	UEFA	5	2	0	3	5	5	+0
Malta	UEFA	6	5	1	0	19	4	+15
Moldova	UEFA	11	7	4	0	23	5	+18
Montenegro	UEFA	2	2	0	0	4	2	+2
Netherlands	UEFA	9	2	3	4	6	13	-7
Norway	UEFA	5	0	0	5	2	10	-8
Poland	UEFA	8	3	3	2	15	14	+1
Portugal	UEFA	5	3	0	2	3	3	+0
Romania	UEFA	6	3	0	3	5	13	-8
Russia	UEFA	5	2	1	2	10	9	+1
Saudi Arabia	AFC	1	1	0	0	6	1	+5
Scotland	UEFA	5	3	2	0	13	5	+8
Slovakia	UEFA	8	1	5	2	7	6	+1
Slovenia	UEFA	10	7	2	1	18	6	+12
Serbia	UEFA	6	1	4	1	5	7	-2
Spain	UEFA	4	1	1	2	2	6	-4
Sweden	UEFA	3	1	0	2	7	3	+4
Switzerland	UEFA	5	2	1	2	7	6	+1
Syria	AFC	3	1	1	1	2	2	+0
Tajikistan	AFC	1	1	0	0	4	1	+3
Turkey	UEFA	13	6	3	4	19	14	+5
Turkmenistan	AFC	1	1	0	0	5	0	+5
United States	CONCACAF	1	0	1	0	1	1	+0
Uzbekistan	AFC	5	2	3	0	7	3	+4
Wales	UEFA	2	2	0	0	4	0	+4

- Serbia and Montenegro +1=1-1 2-4 (Yugoslavia)
- Kyrgyzstan national +1=0-0 4-0
- Norway u-23 +0=0-1 0-2
- England C +0=0-1 0-2

== Home venues record ==
Since the game Ukraine v Belarus (28 October 1992), Ukraine youth team have played their home games at 19 different stadiums.

Venue	City	Played	Won	Drawn	Lost	GF	GA	Points per game
VVL Dynamo	Kyiv	43	20	17	6	76	36	1.79
Bannikov	Kyiv	13	8	3	2	24	11	2.08
Obolon Arena	Kyiv	12	5	6	1	22	8	1.75
Boreks	Borodianka	5	3	1	1	8	6	2
Tsentralnyi	Cherkasy	5	3	0	2	7	5	1.8
Shakhtar	Chervonohrad	3	3	0	0	11	0	3
Dynamo Training Center	Kyiv, Koncha-Zaspa	3	2	1	0	7	1	2.33
CSK ZSU	Kyiv	2	2	0	0	8	2	3
Lokomotyv	Donetsk	2	2	0	0	3	1	3
Kolos	Boryspil	2	1	1	0	2	0	2
Sevastopol	Sevastopol	2	1	1	0	3	1	2
Slavutych-Arena	Zaporizhzhia	2	1	0	1	5	2	1.5
Arena Lviv	Lviv	2	1	0	1	4	2	1.5
Auto ZAZ	Zaporizhzhia	1	1	0	0	5	0	3
SKA	Odesa	1	1	0	0	4	0	3
Metalist	Kharkiv	1	1	0	0	4	0	3
Ternopilsky	Ternopil	1	0	1	0	0	0	1
Ukraina	Lviv	1	0	1	0	1	1	1
Illichivets	Mariupol	1	0	0	1	2	3	0
Totals		102	55	32	15	196	79	1.94

Last updated: 2 June 2016. Statistics include official FIFA-recognised matches only.

== See also ==
- Ukraine national football team
- UEFA European Under-21 Championship
- 2006 UEFA European Under-21 Football Championship
- 2006 UEFA Under-21 Championship Finalists
