= Vilkaitis =

- Lithuanian surname
- f.: (unmarried): Vilkaitytė
- f.: (married): Vilkaitienė
- f.: (short): Vilkaitė

Vilkaitis is a Lithuanian surname. Notable people with the surname include:

- Aurimas Vilkaitis (born 1993), Lithuanian footballer
- Remigijus Vilkaitis (born 1950), Lithuanian actor
