= Krivak =

Krivak may refer to:

- Krivak-class frigate, the NATO reporting name of a Soviet frigate class
- Andrew Krivak, American writer
- Fabijan Krivak (born 2005), Croatian footballer
- Joe Krivak (1935–2012), American football player and coach
