= Unai Melgosa =

Spanish football manager (born 1976)

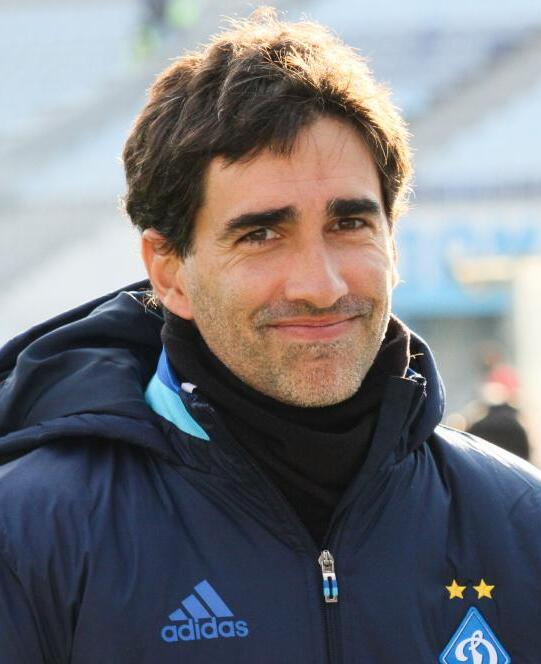
- Melgosa with Dynamo Kyiv (U19) in 2016

Personal information
- Full name: Unai Melgosa Zorrilla
- Date of birth: 11 January 1976 (age 50)
- Place of birth: Bilbao, Spain

Managerial career
- Years: Team
- 2004–2011: Athletic Bilbao (youth)
- 2011–2012: Málaga (psychiatrist)
- 2012–2014: Athletic Bilbao (youth)
- 2015–2017: Dynamo Kyiv (U19)
- 2017–2019: Aspire Academy
- 2019–2021: Ferencváros (assistant)
- 2021–2023: Al Ain (assistant)
- 2023: Ukraine (assistant)
- 2023–2026: Ukraine U21

Unai Melgosa Zorrilla (born 11 January 1976) is a Spanish football manager.

== Career ==
Melgosa, who was born in Bilbao, was hired to local Athletic working with youth as a psychological coach. After 7 years, Melgosa for a season worked as a psychologist for Málaga and later returned to Athletic. In 2014 he left his home team.

From 2015 to 2017, he was the coach of the youth team of Dynamo Kyiv. Among his students were the future main players of the "white and blue" team - Mykola Shaparenko, Oleksandr Tymchyk, and Volodymyr Shepelev.

From 2017 to 2019, he worked at the Aspire Academy in Qatar, and in March 2019 he joined the coaching staff of Serhiy Rebrov in Hungarian Ferencváros. Later, together with Rebrov, he worked in the United Arab Emirates Al Ain FC.

After Serhiy Rebrov headed the Ukraine national team on 7 June 2023, Melgosa joined his staff, and already on 25 July, on the initiative of Rebrov, the Spanish specialist became the head coach of the Ukraine U21.

== Managerial statistics ==
As of match played 22 June 2026

Managerial record by team and tenure
Team	Nat	From	To	Record							
Team	Nat	From	To	G	W	D	L	GF	GA	GD	Win %
Ukraine U21	(Ukraine)	25 July 2023	22 June 2026	29	13	5	11	45	38	+7	44.83
Career total				29	13	5	11	45	38	+7	44.83
