= Pori Stadium =

Multi-purpose stadium in Finland

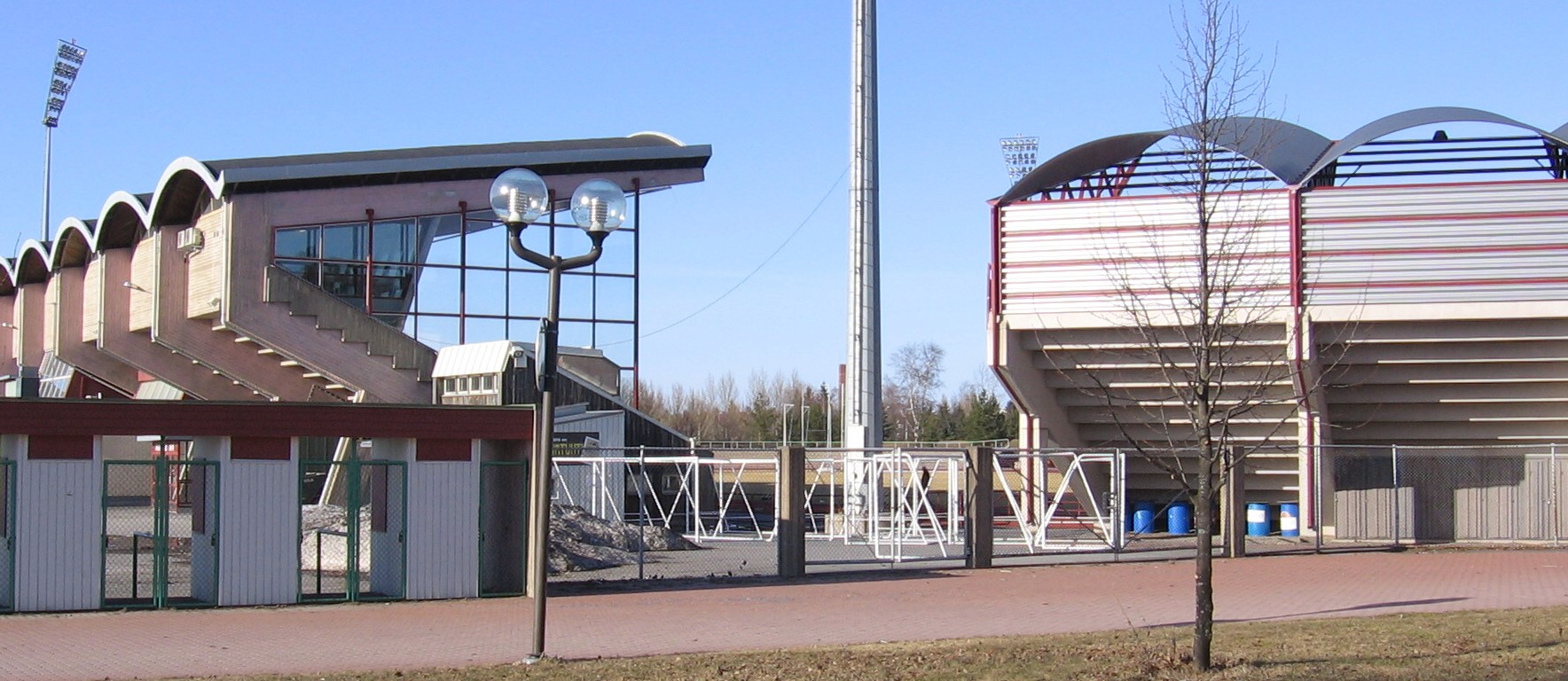
- Interactive map of Pori Stadium
- Location: Pori, Finland
- Coordinates: 61°28′36″N 021°46′28″E
- Owner: City of Pori
- Capacity: 12,300 (4,094 seated)
- Surface: Grass, heated
- Field size: 103 × 67 m

Construction
- Opened: 1965
- Renovated: 1981, 1990, 1999–2000

Tenants
- FC Jazz (1966-2025); Musan Salama (2019–2022)

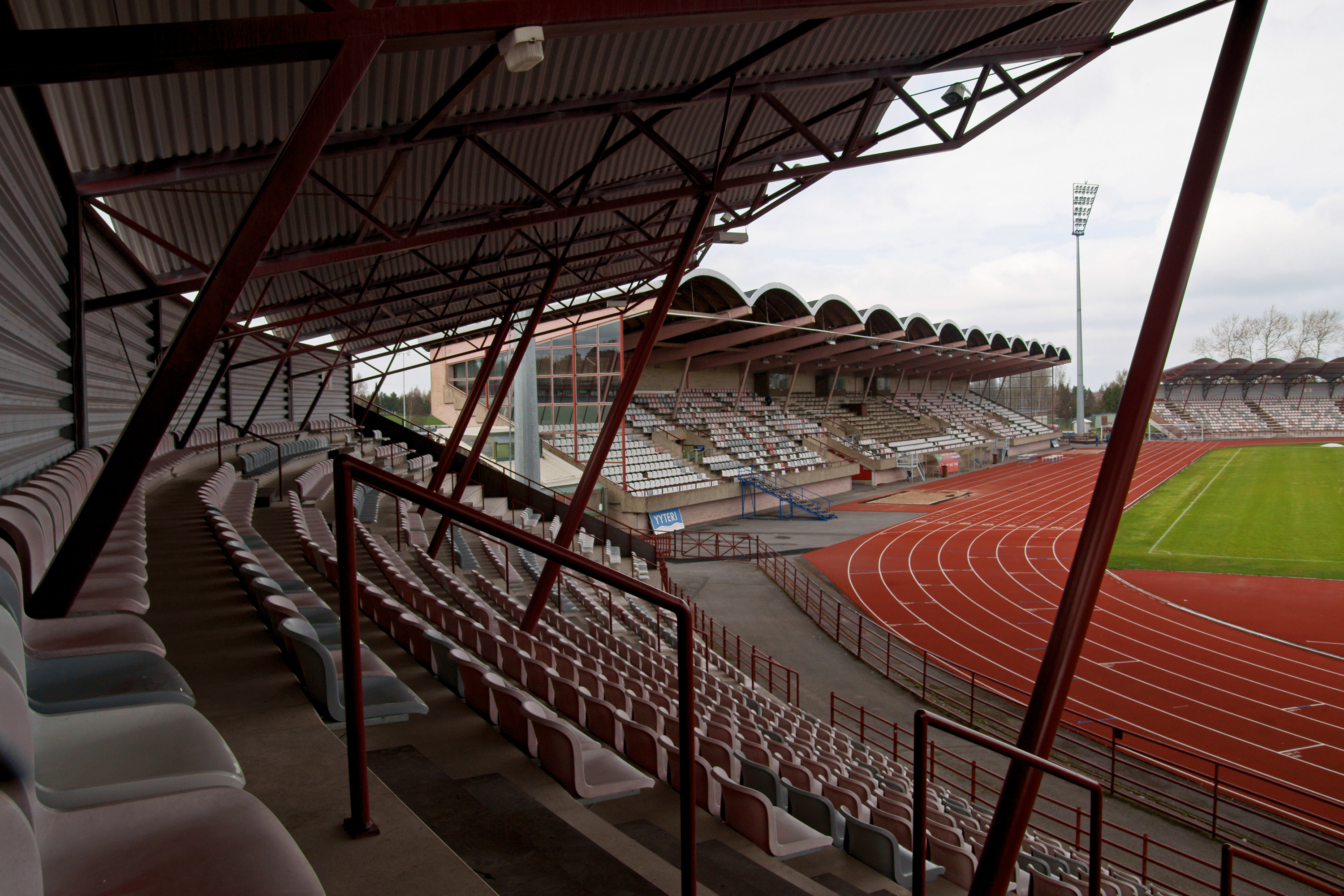
View from the south curve.

Pori Stadium (Finnish: Porin stadion) is a multi-purpose stadium in Pori, Finland. It is also the former home ground of FC Jazz, FC PoPa and Musan Salama.

Pori Stadium is located at Isomäki sports center some two kilometres south of the city. Stadium is sometimes nicknamed as the Stadium of Eternal Wind due to windy conditions that are common on the stadium and its surroundings. By the main entrance is a javelin thrower statue by Finnish sculptor Kalervo Kallio which is inspired by Matti Järvinen's gold medal throw at the 1932 Summer Olympics.

== History ==
Pori Stadium was built in 1963–1965. It is the third main stadium in Pori replacing the 1935 opened Herralahti Stadium. The football ground was built first and the opening match was played in May 1963. Stadium was completed two years later as the stands and other facilities were finished. During its history, Pori Stadium has been renovated three times. The latest uplift in 1999–2000 was made to implement new stands and lights.

Finland national football team has played twice at Pori Stadium. May 1984 Finland beat Northern Ireland in the 1986 World Cup qualification and three years later Finnish Olympic team played against Austria. Pori Stadium was the venue of 1993 Finnish Cup final. The Finnish Championships in Athletics, Kalevan kisat -games, have been competed at Pori Stadium in 1967, 1983, 2005 and 2015.

Attendance record 12,050 was made at 1967 Kalevan kisat. The record in football matches is 11,193 in October 1993 as FC Jazz played its season's last game against MyPa with the national title on the line.

== Football internationals at Pori Stadium ==
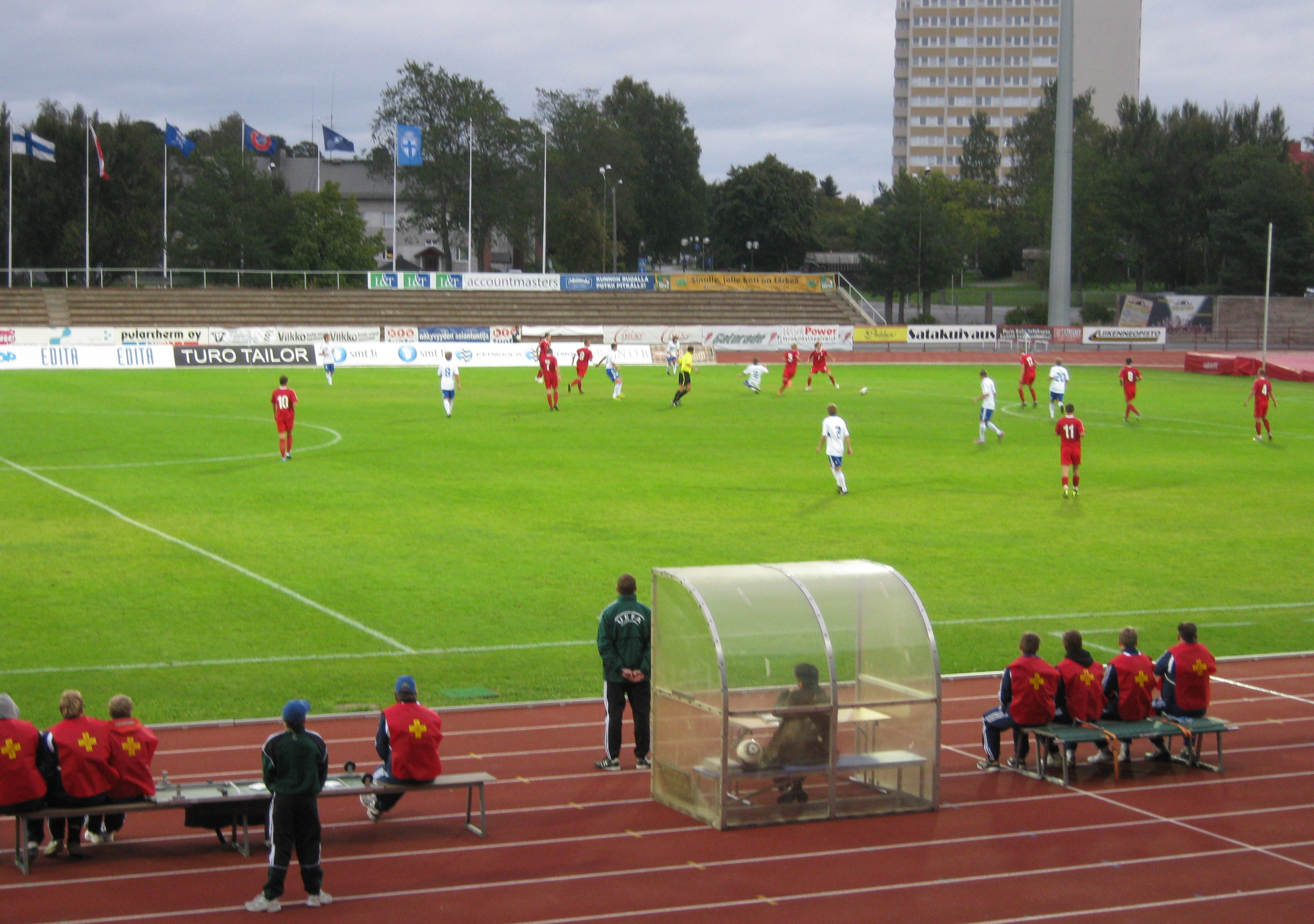
U-21 international Finland vs Poland in September 2010.

| Date | Level | Teams | Result | Attendance |
|---|---|---|---|---|
| 12 May 1966 | U-23 friendly | Finland vs Israel | 0–2 | 1,831 |
| 10 September 1968 | U-18 friendly | Finland vs. Sweden | 1–1 | 600 |
| 27 June 1978 | U-21 friendly | Finland vs Sweden | 0–2 | 1,506 |
| 27 May 1984 | 1986 World Cup qualification | Finland vs Northern Ireland | 1–0 | 8,155 |
| 24 August 1985 | Women's friendly | Finland vs Belgium | 1–0 | 2,352 |
| 12 May 1987 | 1988 Olympic qualification | Finland vs Austria | 2–1 | 3,912 |
| 28 August 1990 | U-16 friendly | Finland vs Sweden | 2–2 | 3,300 |
| 12 May 1993 | 1994 UEFA U-21 qualification | Finland vs Austria | 2–0 | 3,682 |
| 9 October 2004 | 2006 UEFA U-21 qualification | Finland vs Armenia | 0–1 | 1,300 |
| 27 July 2009 | Women's friendly | Finland vs Sweden | 1–3 | 2,712 |
| 3 September 2010 | 2011 UEFA U-21 qualification | Finland vs Poland | 2–0 | 1,651 |
| 10 August 2011 | 2013 UEFA U-21 qualification | Finland vs Slovenia | 1–0 | 2,318 |
