= Donatas Nakrošius =

Lithuanian footballer

Personal information
- Date of birth: 17 February 1991 (age 35)
- Place of birth: Panevėžys, Lithuania
- Height: 1.87 m (6 ft 2 in)
- Position: Defender

Senior career*
Years	Team	Apps	(Gls)
2009–2010	Kauno Jėgeriai		
2010–2012	Kaunas	33	(0)
2012–2013	Stal Rzeszów	34	(1)
2013–2014	Atlantas	3	(1)
2014	Odra Opole	14	(1)
2014–2015	Klaipėdos Granitas	13	(0)
2015–2017	Polonia Warsaw	76	(3)
2017–2018	MKS Kluczbork	29	(2)
2018–2019	Olimpia Grudziądz	20	(0)
2019–2020	Górnik Łęczna	12	(2)
2020–2023	Garbarnia Kraków	101	(4)
2023	Podhale Nowy Targ	16	(0)
2024	Legionovia Legionowo	13	(2)
2024–2025	Polonia Warsaw II	23	(1)

International career
2010	Lithuania U19	1	(0)
2011–2013	Lithuania U21	11	(2)
- * Club domestic league appearances and goals

Donatas Nakrošius (born 17 February 1991) is a Lithuanian former professional footballer who played as a defender. He has spent most of his career in the Polish third-tier II liga.

== Early life ==
His father being a handball player, Nakrošius practiced basketball as a child and was part of his school teams.

== Poland ==
Able to speak some Polish, the Lithuanian defender quickly acculturated into Poland and Rzeszów upon getting there in 2012, making 34 appearances and scoring 1 goal.

He has stated that the main problem with football in Latvia and Lithuania is that the clubs do not know how to manage their money and sometimes do not have sponsors.

Nakrošius retired from professional football at the end of the 2023–24 season, before joining Polonia Warsaw's reserve side in August 2024.

== Personal life ==
Meeting his wife, Kasia, in Rzeszów, Nakrošius has a son and a daughter.

== Honours ==
Polonia Warsaw

- III liga Łódź–Masovia: 2015–16

Polonia Warsaw II

- Polish Cup (Warsaw regionals): 2024–25
