= Dejan Lazarević (footballer) =

Slovenian footballer (born 1990)

Personal information
- Date of birth: 15 February 1990 (age 36)
- Place of birth: Ljubljana, SFR Yugoslavia
- Height: 1.77 m (5 ft 10 in)
- Position: Winger

Team information
- Current team: SV Donau Klagenfurt

Youth career
- 2000–2007: Domžale
- 2007–2009: Genoa

Senior career*
Years	Team	Apps	(Gls)
2009–2011	Genoa	2	(0)
2010–2011	→ Torino (loan)	32	(0)
2011–2012	Padova	30	(1)
2012–2013	Genoa	0	(0)
2012–2013	→ Modena (loan)	34	(5)
2013–2017	Chievo	22	(2)
2015	→ Sassuolo (loan)	10	(0)
2015–2016	→ Antalyaspor (loan)	17	(2)
2016–2017	→ Karabükspor (loan)	20	(0)
2018	Jagiellonia Białystok	8	(0)
2018–2020	Domžale	34	(1)
2021–2022	Legnago Salus	28	(2)
2024–2026	Domžale	17	(0)
2026–	SV Donau Klagenfurt	0	(0)

International career
2006	Slovenia U17	2	(0)
2007–2009	Slovenia U19	12	(1)
2010–2012	Slovenia U21	12	(7)
2011–2015	Slovenia	20	(1)
2019	Slovenia B	1	(0)
- * Club domestic league appearances and goals as of 30 January 2026

Dejan Lazarević (born 15 February 1990) is a Slovenian professional footballer who plays as a winger for Austrian club SV Donau Klagenfurt.

== Club career ==
=== Jagiellonia Białystok ===
On 18 January 2018, Lazarević signed a two-and-a-half-year contract with Jagiellonia Białystok.

=== Legnago Salus ===
On 31 January 2021, he joined Italian third-tier Serie C club Legnago Salus.

== International career ==
Having represented Slovenia at all youth levels from under-17 to under-21, Lazarević made his debut for the senior team on 15 November 2011 in a friendly match against the United States, replacing Armin Bačinović late in the game. Overall, he earned a total of 20 caps, scoring 1 goal until his final cap in 2015.

== Career statistics ==
=== International ===
Appearances and goals by national team and year
National team	Year	Apps	Goals
Slovenia	2011	1	0
Slovenia	2013	5	0
Slovenia	2014	7	0
Slovenia	2015	7	1
Total		20	1

Scores and results list Slovenia's goal tally first, score column indicates score after each Lazarević goal.

List of international goals scored by Dejan Lazarević
No.	Date	Venue	Opponent	Score	Result	Competition
1	27 March 2015	Stožice Stadium, Ljubljana, Slovenia	San Marino	5–0	6–0	UEFA Euro 2016 qualification
