= Terence Vella =

Maltese footballer

Personal information
- Date of birth: 20 April 1990 (age 36)
- Place of birth: Gudja, Malta
- Height: 1.84 m (6 ft 1/2 in)
- Position: Forward

Senior career*
| Years | Team | Apps | (Gls) |
| 2007–2011 | Gudja United | | |
- → Pietà Hotspurs (loan)
| 2009–2010 | → Mosta (loan) | | |
| 2010–2011 | → Birkirkara (loan) | 20 | (3) |
| 2011–2018 | Birkirkara | 33 | (3) |
| 2012 | → Mosta (loan) | 5 | (0) |
| 2012–2013 | → Hamrun Spartans (loan) | 29 | (7) |
| 2014–2015 | → Naxxar Lions (loan) | 33 | (7) |
| 2015–2016 | → Qormi (loan) | 21 | (4) |
| 2016–2018 | → Senglea Athletic (loan) | 39 | (12) |
| 2018–2020 | Floriana | 21 | (2) |
| 2020–2021 | Gudja United | 13 | (1) |
| 2021–2022 | Marsaxlokk | 17 | (7) |
| 2023 | Marsaxlokk | 9 | (1) |
| 2023–2024 | Senglea Athletic | 35 | (9) |
| 2025 | Swieqi United | 11 | (1) |
| 2025–2026 | Mġarr United | 21 | (5) |

International career^{‡}
| 2012–2015 | Malta | 10 | (0) |
- * Club domestic league appearances and goals as of 21 June 2026 ‡ National team caps and goals as of 16:45, 2 August 2021 (UTC)

Terence Vella (born 20 April 1990) is a Maltese professional footballer who plays as a forward.

== Playing career ==
=== Marsaxlokk ===
Vella signed for Maltese Challenge League side Marsaxlokk on 19 June 2021.

== Honours ==
=== Club ===
Floriana

- Maltese Premier League (1): 2019–20
