= Danylo Krevsun =

Ukrainian footballer (born 2005)

Danylo Krevsun Данило Кревсун
Personal information
- Full name: Danylo Serhiyovych Krevsun
- Date of birth: 21 April 2005 (age 21)
- Place of birth: Donetsk, Ukraine
- Height: 1.76 m (5 ft 9 in)
- Positions: Midfielder; right-back; wing-back

Team information
- Current team: Zalaegerszeg
- Number: 7

Youth career
- 2019–2020: DYuSSh Shchaslyve
- 2020–2022: Shakhtar Donetsk
- 2022–2023: SC Preußen Münster
- 2023–2024: Borussia Dortmund

Senior career*
Years	Team	Apps	(Gls)
2024–2026	Borussia Dortmund II	56	(2)
2026	Borussia Dortmund	0	(0)
2026–	Zalaegerszeg	3	(0)

International career^{‡}
2024	Ukraine U19	6	(2)
2025	Ukraine U20	6	(1)
2025–	Ukraine U21	7	(2)
- * Club domestic league appearances and goals as of 29 August 2026 ‡ National team caps and goals as of 8 June 2026

Danylo Serhiyovych Krevsun (Ukrainian: Данило Сергійович Кревсун; born 21 April 2005) is a Ukrainian professional footballer who plays as a midfielder, right-back and wing-back for Hungarian club Zalaegerszeg.

== Early life ==
Krevsun was born on 21 April 2005 in Donetsk, Ukraine, and is the son of Ukrainian runner Yuliya Krevsun. Moving with his family from Donetsk, Ukraine to Vinnytsia, Ukraine in 2014 due to the War in Donbas, he moved with his family from Vinnytsia, Ukraine to Kharkiv, Ukraine in 2015.

Three years later, he moved with his family from Kharkiv, Ukraine to Kyiv, Ukraine. Subsequently, he moved with his family from Kyiv, Ukraine to Germany in 2022 due to the Russian invasion of Ukraine.

== Club career ==
As a youth player, Krevsun began his career in several Kharkiv-based football academies starting as early as 2015. In 2019, after relocating to Kyiv, he joined a local sports school, which happened to be in close vicinity with the youth academy of Ukrainian side Shakhtar Donetsk. In 2020, Krevsun moved to the Shakhtar football academy. In 2022, he joined the youth academy of German side SC Preußen Münster. Six months later, he joined the youth academy of German Bundesliga side Borussia Dortmund, where he played in the UEFA Youth League and was promoted to the club's reserve team in 2024. On 6 April 2024, he debuted for them during a 2–3 away loss to SV Sandhausen in the league.

He made his only bench appearance for Borussia's senior team on 17 February 2026 in a Champions League game against Atalanta.

On 14 August 2026, Krevsun signed a three-year contract with Zalaegerszeg in Hungary.

== International career ==
Krevsun is a Ukraine youth international. During the summer of 2024, he played for the Ukraine national under-19 football team at the 2024 UEFA European Under-19 Championship.

== Career statistics ==
As of 26 April 2026

Appearances and goals by club, season and competition
Club	Season	League			DFB-Pokal		Europe		Other		Total	
Club	Season	Division	Apps	Goals	Apps	Goals	Apps	Goals	Apps	Goals	Apps	Goals
Borussia Dortmund II	2023–24	3. Liga	1	0	—		—		—		1	0
Borussia Dortmund II	2024–25	3. Liga	24	0	—		—		—		24	0
Borussia Dortmund II	2025–26	Regionalliga West	28	2	—		—		4 (Note: Appearances in Premier League International Cup)	0	32	2
Borussia Dortmund	2025–26	Bundesliga	—		—		0	0	—		0	0
Career total			53	2	0	0	0	0	4	0	57	2
