= Ramik Hadzhyiev =

Ukrainian footballer (born 2005)

Personal information
- Full name: Ramik Zamik-ogly Hadzhyiev
- Date of birth: 14 August 2005 (age 21)
- Place of birth: Baku, Azerbaijan
- Height: 1.80 m (5 ft 11 in)
- Position: Left forward

Team information
- Current team: Metalist 1925 Kharkiv
- Number: 14

Youth career
- 2016–2018: Youth Sportive School #4 Kharkiv
- 2018–2019: Arena Kharkiv
- 2019–2020: Metalist 1925 Kharkiv
- 2020–2021: MFA Mukachevo
- 2021–2022: Rukh Lviv
- 2022–2023: Dnipro-1

Senior career*
Years	Team	Apps	(Gls)
2023–2024	Dnipro-1	9	(1)
2024–	Metalist 1925 Kharkiv	14	(2)

International career^{‡}
2024	Ukraine U19	7	(0)
2025	Ukraine U20	3	(1)
2025–	Ukraine U21	1	(1)
- * Club domestic league appearances and goals as of 3 June 2026 ‡ National team caps and goals as of 5 September 2025

Ramik Hadzhyiev (Ukrainian: Рамік Замік огли Гаджиєв; born 14 August 2005) is a professional footballer who plays as a left-forward. Born in Azerbaijan, he represents Ukraine at youth level.

== Club career ==
Born in Baku, Azerbaijan but moved to Kharkiv during his childhood Hadzhyiev began his career in the Youth Sportive School #4 Kharkiv, before transferring to another Kharkiv football academy Arena and continued in the Metalist 1925 Kharkiv one year later. Then he continued in the MFA Mukachevo academy with trainer Ivan Fizer and in September 2022 joined Dnipro-1.

He made his debut as a second half-time substituted player for Dnipro-1 in the Ukrainian Premier League in an away winning match against Zorya Luhansk on 24 September 2023.

== International career ==
In March 2024, Hadzhyiev was called up by manager Dmytro Mykhaylenko to the final squad of the Ukraine national under-19 football team to play in the 2024 UEFA European Under-19 Championship elit round matches, and later, in July 2024, he was called up by the same manager to the final squad of the Ukraine national under-19 football team to play in the 2024 UEFA European Under-19 Championship tournament matches.
