= Ediz Bahtiyaroğlu =

Turkish footballer (1986–2012)

Personal information
- Full name: Ediz Bahtiyaroğlu
- Date of birth: 2 January 1986
- Place of birth: Bursa, Turkey
- Date of death: 5 September 2012 (aged 26)
- Place of death: Eskişehir, Turkey
- Height: 1.90 m (6 ft 3 in)
- Position: Centre back

Youth career
- 2000–2004: Bursaspor
- 2004–2005: Ankaraspor

Senior career*
Years	Team	Apps	(Gls)
2005–2010	Ankaraspor	60	(2)
2005–2006	→ Keçiörengücü (loan)	26	(3)
2009–2010	→ Ankaragücü (loan)	14	(0)
2010–2011	Ankaragücü	11	(0)
2010–2011	→ Bucaspor (loan)	16	(1)
2011–2012	Eskişehirspor	14	(0)
Total		141	(6)

International career
2006–2007	Turkey U21	11	(1)
- * Club domestic league appearances and goals as of 7 September 2011

Ediz Bahtiyaroğlu (Bosnian: Edis Bahtijarević; 2 January 1986 – 5 September 2012) was a Turkish football player who last played for Eskişehirspor in the Turkish Süper Lig.

== International career ==
Bahtiyaroğlu has been capped 11 times for the Turkish national under-21 team. He announced he would play for Bosnia and Herzegovina after meeting with then national team coach Safet Sušić.

== Personal life ==
He had Bosnian citizenship from his Bosniak father İsmail Bahtiyaroğlu (born Ismail Bahtijarević) who was born in Bosnia and Herzegovina and came to Turkey when he was 13.

=== Death ===
On 5 September 2012, Bahtiyaroğlu died in Eskişehir from a heart attack. He was aged 26.
