= Stefan Büchel =

Liechtenstein footballer

Personal information
- Date of birth: 30 June 1986 (age 40)
- Place of birth: Liechtenstein
- Height: 1.73 m (5 ft 8 in)
- Position: Midfielder

Senior career*
Years	Team	Apps	(Gls)
2005–2006	FC Vaduz	?	(?)
2006–2012	USV Eschen/Mauren	58	(8)

International career^{‡}
2005–2009	Liechtenstein	9	(0)
- * Club domestic league appearances and goals as of 19 July 2020 ‡ National team caps and goals as of 21 November 2009

Stefan Büchel (born 30 June 1986) is a former international footballer from Liechtenstein who played as a midfielder. Büchel last played club football for USV Eschen/Mauren, and formerly played for FC Vaduz.
