= Fabijan Krivak =

Croatian association football player (born 2005)

Personal information
- Date of birth: 24 February 2005 (age 21)
- Place of birth: Zabok, Croatia
- Height: 1.82 m (6 ft 0 in)
- Position: Attacking midfielder

Team information
- Current team: Sigma Olomouc
- Number: 23

Youth career
- ?-2019: NK Ivančica Zlatar Bistrica
- 2019-2023: NK Lokomotiva Zagreb

Senior career*
Years	Team	Apps	(Gls)
2022–2026	Lokomotiva Zagreb	51	(4)
2023	→ Jarun (dual registration)	9	(1)
2026–	Sigma Olomouc	9	(2)

International career^{‡}
2023–	Croatia U19	6	(0)
2025–	Croatia U21	1	(1)
- * Club domestic league appearances and goals as of 10:03 (UTC) 26 May 2026 ‡ National team caps and goals as of 20:50 (UTC) 6 June 2025

Fabijan Krivak (born 24 February 2005) is a Croatian footballer who plays as a right forward for Sigma Olomouc of the Czech First League. He is a Croatian youth international.

== Club career ==
A product of the NK Lokomotiva Zagreb academy, he made his senior league debut in April 2022 home against HNK Rijeka in the Croatian First Football League. During the 2022/23 season he also played on loan at NK Jarun Zagreb in the Second Football League. He scored his first senior league goal in a 2:1 win for Jarun over NK Kustošija Zagreb on 24 April 2023.

He had a breakthrough season in 2023/24, playing 20 games for the first team of Lokomotivia and contributing a goal in a 2:2 draw against Dinamo Zagreb, his first league goal for the club. His form was such he was linked to a transfer to Serie A side AS Roma, led by José Mourinho at the time. However, an anterior cruciate knee ligament injury in June 2024 hampered his progress. After nine months out through injury, he returned to the Lokomotiva first team match day squad for their Croatian First Football League match against HNK Gorica on 28 March 2025. He made his return to the pitch for the club appearing as a second-half substitute for Luka Vrbančić in a 1:1 away draw in the Croatian First Football League against Hajduk Split on 13 April 2025.

He started the 2025/26 season with a great solo goal in a 1:0 win against Vukovar 91 and earned his first player of the match award.

On 30 December 2025, Krivak signed a multi-year contract with Czech First League club Sigma Olomouc.

== International career ==
He is a Croatia U19 international. In March 2024, he was called up to the Croatia national under-21 football team ahead of their UEFA European U21 Championship qualifying matches against Andorra U21 and Portugal U21.

== Personal life ==
Born in Zabok, he played youth football in NK Ivančica Zlatar-Bistrica before joining Lokomotiva Zagreb.
