= Aurimas Vilkaitis =

Lithuanian footballer

Personal information
- Full name: Aurimas Vilkaitis
- Date of birth: 11 February 1993 (age 33)
- Place of birth: Jonava, Lithuania
- Height: 1.93 m (6 ft 4 in)
- Position: Centre-back

Senior career*
Years	Team	Apps	(Gls)
2010–2013	Lazio	0	(0)
2013	→ Nocerina (loan)	4	(0)

International career^{‡}
2012	Lithuania	1	(0)
- * Club domestic league appearances and goals as of 1 March 2014 ‡ National team caps and goals as of 17 November 2012

Aurimas Vilkaitis (born 11 February 1993) is a Lithuanian professional footballer who plays as a defender.
