= Emirhan İlkhan =

Turkish footballer (born 2004)

Personal information
- Date of birth: 1 June 2004 (age 22)
- Place of birth: Istanbul, Turkey
- Height: 1.75 m (5 ft 9 in)
- Position: Midfielder

Team information
- Current team: Torino
- Number: 6

Youth career
- 2013–2014: Florya 1923 Spor
- 2014–2021: Beşiktaş

Senior career*
Years	Team	Apps	(Gls)
2021–2022	Beşiktaş	11	(1)
2022–	Torino	23	(1)
2023	→ Sampdoria (loan)	8	(0)
2023–2024	→ İstanbul Başakşehir (loan)	30	(1)

International career^{‡}
2019–2020	Turkey U16	5	(0)
2021	Turkey U18	6	(2)
2022–	Turkey U21	9	(2)
- * Club domestic league appearances and goals as of 25 May 2026 ‡ National team caps and goals as of 21:21, 15 November 2025 (UTC)

Emirhan İlkhan (born 1 June 2004) is a Turkish professional footballer who plays as a midfielder for Serie A club Torino.

== Club career ==
=== Beşiktaş ===
A youth product of Beşiktaş, İlkhan began training with their senior team in 2021. He made his professional debut with Antalyaspor in a 1–1 (4–2) 2021 Turkish Super Cup penalty shootout win over Antalyaspor 5 January 2022, coming on as a late sub in the 80' minute. He played 11 matches and scored 1 goal in Süper Lig.

=== Torino ===
On 10 August 2022, İlkhan signed with Torino in Italy. On 13 August 2022, he made his Serie A debut against AC Monza. He was late substitute for 2-1 win away game.

==== Sampdoria (loan) ====
On 31 January 2023, he was loaned by Sampdoria. On 27 February 2023, he made his debut with the team against SS Lazio and 1-0 lost in away game.

==== Istanbul Başakşehir (loan) ====
On 29 August 2023, he was loaned by İstanbul Başakşehir for 2023-24 Süper Lig season. On 2 September 2023, he made his debut with the team against Konyaspor and 1-0 lost in home game. He played 30 matches and scored 1 goal in Süper Lig and also played 4 matches and scored 1 goal in Turkish cup.

== International career ==
Emirhan is a youth international for Turkey, having represented the Turkey U16s and U18s.

== Career statistics ==
=== Club ===
As of match played 13 March 2026

Appearances and goals by club, season and competition
Club	Season	League			Cup (Note: Includes Turkish Cup and Coppa Italia)		Continental		Other		Total	
Club	Season	Division	Apps	Goals	Apps	Goals	Apps	Goals	Apps	Goals	Apps	Goals
Beşiktaş U19	2020–21	U19 Ligi	17	4	—		—		—		17	4
Beşiktaş U19	2021–22	U19 Ligi	17	9	—		—		—		17	9
Beşiktaş U19	Total		34	13	0	0	0	0	0	0	34	13
Beşiktaş	2021–22	Süper Lig	11	1	0	0	—		1 (Note: Appearance Turkish Super Cup)	0	11	1
Torino	2022–23	Serie A	4	0	0	0	—		—		4	0
Torino	2024–25	Serie A	0	0	0	0	0	0	—		0	0
Torino	2025–26	Serie A	13	1	3	1	—		—		16	2
Torino	Total		17	1	3	1	0	0	0	0	20	2
Sampdoria (loan)	2022–23	Serie A	8	0	0	0	—		—		8	0
İstanbul Başakşehir (loan)	2023–24	Süper Lig	30	1	4	1	—		—		34	2
Career total			100	16	7	2	0	0	1	0	108	18

== Honours ==
Beşiktaş

- Turkish Super Cup: 2021
