= 2023–24 HNK Hajduk Split season =

Hajduk Split
2023–24 season
- Chairman/ Chairwoman: Lukša Jakobušić (until 8 April 2024); Marinka Akrap (interim) (8 – 25 April 2024); Ivan Bilić (since 25 April 2024)
- Manager: Ivan Leko (until 23 October 2023); Mislav Karoglan (23 October 2023 – 8 April 2024); Jure Ivanković (interim) (since 8 April 2024)
- HNL: 3rd
- Croatian Cup: Semi-finals
- Europa Conference League: Third qualifying round
- Croatian Super Cup: Runners-up
- Top goalscorer: League: Marko Livaja (10); All: Marko Livaja (12)
- Highest home attendance: 33,824 (vs. Dinamo Zagreb) (1 October 2023)
- Lowest home attendance: 0 (two matches)
- Average home league attendance: 18,873
Home colours	Away colours	Third colours

The 2023–24 season was the 113th season in Hajduk Split’s history and their thirty-third in the HNL.

== First-team squad ==
As of 31 January 2024

Note: Flags indicate national team as defined under FIFA eligibility rules; some limited exceptions apply. Players may hold more than one non-FIFA nationality.

No.	Pos.	Nation	Player
3	DF	CRO	Dominik Prpić
4	FW	CRO	Ivan Perišić (on loan from Tottenham Hotspur)
5	DF	CIV	Ismaël Diallo
6	MF	CRO	Mihael Žaper
7	MF	AUS	Anthony Kalik
8	MF	BEL	Vadis Odjidja-Ofoe
9	FW	CRO	Nikola Kalinić
10	FW	CRO	Marko Livaja (Vice-captain)
11	MF	MAR	Yassine Benrahou
13	GK	AUT	Ivan Lučić
17	DF	CRO	Dario Melnjak
18	DF	MAR	Fahd Moufi
19	DF	CRO	Josip Elez
20	MF	CRO	Niko Sigur
21	MF	USA	Rokas Pukštas
22	FW	GER	Leon Dajaku

No.	Pos.	Nation	Player
23	MF	CRO	Filip Krovinović (3rd captain)
24	DF	CRO	Dino Mikanović
25	DF	CRO	Filip Uremović
27	FW	MKD	Aleksandar Trajkovski
28	MF	CRO	Roko Brajković
30	MF	HUN	László Kleinheisler (on loan from Panathinaikos)
31	DF	CRO	Zvonimir Šarlija
32	DF	CRO	Šimun Hrgović
37	MF	CRO	Noa Skoko
40	GK	CRO	Borna Buljan
70	FW	CRO	Josip Brekalo (on loan from Fiorentina)
77	MF	KOS	Emir Sahiti
88	MF	CRO	Ivan Ćubelić
91	GK	CRO	Lovre Kalinić (Captain)
97	DF	POR	Ferro
99	FW	BIH	Filip Čuić

== Competitions ==
=== Overview ===
Competition	First match	Last match	Starting round	Final position	Record							
Competition	First match	Last match	Starting round	Final position	Pld	W	D	L	GF	GA	GD	Win %
SuperSport HNL	21 July 2023	25 May 2024	Matchday 1	3rd	36	21	5	10	54	26	+28	58.33
Croatian Cup	13 September 2023	3 April 2024	First Round	Semi-finals	4	3	0	1	13	1	+12	75.00
Europa Conference League	10 August 2023	17 August 2023	Third qualifying round	Third qualifying round	2	0	1	1	0	3	−3	0.00
Croatian Super Cup	15 July 2023		Final	Runners-up	1	0	0	1	0	1	−1	0.00
Total					43	24	6	13	67	31	+36	55.81

Last updated: 26 May 2024
Source: Soccerway

=== SuperSport HNL ===
==== Classification ====
Pos	Team	Pld	W	D	L	GF	GA	GD	Pts	Qualification or relegation
1	Dinamo Zagreb (C)	36	25	7	4	67	30	+37	82	Qualification to Champions League play-off round (Note: Since already qualified Real Madrid won the Champions League, Dinamo Zagreb was promoted to the Champions League play-off round as the champion with the highest coefficient in Champions League qualifying.)
2	Rijeka	36	23	5	8	69	30	+39	74	Qualification to Europa League second qualifying round (Note: The 2023–24 Croatian Football Cup winners qualified for the Europa League second qualifying round. Since the cup winners (Dinamo Zagreb) qualified for the Champions League, the Europa League spot was passed to the second-placed team, and the second Conference League second qualifying round spot was passed to the fourth-placed team.)
3	Hajduk Split	36	21	5	10	54	26	+28	68	Qualification to Conference League second qualifying round
4	Osijek	36	16	9	11	62	43	+19	57	Qualification to Conference League second qualifying round
5	Lokomotiva	36	12	15	9	52	45	+7	51	

Source: SuperSport HNL
Rules for classification: 1) Points; 2) Head-to-head points; 3) Head-to-head goal difference; 4) Head-to-head goals scored (at home if two teams tied); 5) Goal difference; 6) Goals scored; 7) Play-off
(Note: Criteria 2-4 and 7 is only used if deciding champion, teams to international competition or teams for relegation and in that case criteria 6 will not be used).
(C) Champions

==== Results summary ====
Overall								Home						Away					
Pld	W	D	L	GF	GA	GD	Pts	W	D	L	GF	GA	GD	W	D	L	GF	GA	GD
36	21	5	10	54	26	+28	68	11	0	7	28	14	+14	10	5	3	26	12	+14

Last updated: 26 May 2024.
Source: SuperSport HNL

==== Results by round ====
Round	1	2	3	4	5	6	7	8	9	10	11	12	13	14	15	16	17	18	19	20	21	22	23	24	25	26	27	28	29	30	31	32	33	34	35	36
Ground	A	H	A	H	A	A	H	A	H	H	A	H	A	H	H	A	H	A	A	H	A	H	A	A	H	A	H	H	A	H	A	H	H	A	H	A
Result	W	W	W	W	W	W	L	L	W	W	L	L	W	W	W	W	W	D	D	L	D	W	W	D	W	W	L	L	L	L	W	W	L	D	W	W
Position	3	2	1	1	1	1	1	1	1	1	2	2	2	2	1	1	1	1	1	2	3	2	2	3	2	2	3	3	3	3	3	3	3	3	3	3

Updated to match(es) played on 26 May 2024. Source: SuperSport HNL
A = Away; H = Home; W = Win; D = Draw; L = Loss

==== Results by opponent ====
Team	Results				Points
Team	1	2	3	4	Points
Dinamo Zagreb	2–1	1–0	0–0	0–1	7
Gorica	1–2	3–0	3–0	2–1	9
Istra 1961	0–1	2–0	1–0	1–1	7
Lokomotiva	1–0	1–1	1–2	5–2	7
Osijek	1–0	0–2	1–1	1–2	4
Rijeka	1–0	0–1	1–2	0–1	3
Rudeš	2–0	1–0	2–0	5–1	12
Slaven Belupo	3–0	1–0	4–0	1–0	12
Varaždin	2–1	3–1	1–1	0–1	7

Source: 2023–24 Croatian Football League article

== Matches ==
=== Friendlies ===
==== Pre-season ====
24 June 2023 Friendly	Hajduk Split (Croatia)	1–1	(Bosnia and Herzegovina) Široki Brijeg	Split, Croatia
18:30	Benrahou 29'	Report	Chinedu 83'	Stadium: Stadion Poljud; Attendance: 0 Referee: Ante Terzić

28 June 2023 Friendly	Spartak Trnava (Slovakia)	1–1	(Croatia) Hajduk Split	Ljubljana, Slovenia
17:30	Paur 17'	Report	Čuić 27'	Stadium: Šiška Sports Park; Attendance: 0 Referee: Dušan Šabanagić

2 July 2023 Friendly	Olimpija Ljubljana (Slovenia)	1–0	(Croatia) Hajduk Split	Ljubljana, Slovenia
18:00	Ne. Motika 74'	Report		Stadium: Stožice Stadium; Attendance: 4,585; Referee: Asmir Sagrković

5 July 2023 Friendly	MTK Budapest (Hungary)	1–3	(Croatia) Hajduk Split	Ljubljana, Slovenia
17:30	Kata 34'	Report	Dajaku 64'; Livaja 79', 88'	Stadium: Šiška Sports Park; Attendance: 0 Referee: Martin Matoša

7 July 2023 Friendly	Radomlje (Slovenia)	1–1	(Croatia) Hajduk Split	Domžale, Slovenia
17:30	Kukovec 48'	Report	Prpić (yellow card) 55'; Šošić (yellow card) 59'; Čuić 61'	Stadium: Domžale Sports Park; Attendance: 0 Referee: Jelenko Jadrič

8 July 2023 Friendly	Trabzonspor (Turkey)	0–2	(Croatia) Hajduk Split	Ljubljana, Slovenia
11:30		Report	Dolček 14'; Melnjak 33'	Stadium: Šiška Sports Park; Attendance: 0 Referee: Denis Šabanagić

==== On-season (2023) ====
25 July 2023 Friendly	Solin	1–7	Hajduk Split	Mravince, Croatia
	M. Vušković 37'	Report	Pekić 26' (o.g.); Čuić 34', 60'; Kalik 35'; Moufi 45+1'; Brajković 56'; Šošić 87'	Stadium: Glavica; Attendance: 0 Referee: Ante Terzić

5 August 2023 Friendly	Hajduk Split (Croatia)	2–2	(Bosnia and Herzegovina) Sarajevo	Split, Croatia
	Mlakar 54'; Livaja 88'	Report	Čataković 65'; Mustafić 76'	Stadium: Stadion Poljud (training ground); Attendance: 0 Referee: Renato Lacić

==== Mid-season ====
9 January 2024 Friendly	Aluminij (Slovenia)	0–3	(Croatia) Hajduk Split	Umag, Croatia
17:00	Susso (yellow card) 19'	Report	Moufi (yellow card) 24'; Livaja 30'; Prpić 61'; Krovinović 72'	Stadium: Stella Maris Sports Center; Referee: Amel Gizdarević

12 January 2024 Friendly	Fehérvár (Hungary)	2–5 (Note: The game was played in 4 quarters of 30 minutes.)	(Croatia) Hajduk Split	Umag, Croatia
12:00	Gergényi (yellow card) 13'; Szabó 20'; Simut 88'; Husvéth (yellow card) 99'	Report	Livaja 24'; Moufi 55'; Mikanović (yellow card) 72'; N. Kalinić 79'; Trajkovski 104'; Durdov 118'	Stadium: Stella Maris Sports Center; Referee: Antonio Melnjak

17 January 2024 Friendly	Koper (Slovenia)	1–1	(Croatia) Hajduk Split	Koper, Slovenia
17:00	Groznica 66'	Report	Benrahou 87'	Stadium: Bonifika Stadium; Attendance: 2,000; Referee: Mihael Antić

20 January 2024 Friendly	Śląsk Wrocław (Poland)	1–3	(Croatia) Hajduk Split	Umag, Croatia
11:30	Klimala 78' (pen.)	Report	Pukštas (yellow card) 48'; Livaja 76'; Kalinić 83' (pen.); Sahiti 90'	Stadium: Stella Maris Sports Center; Attendance: 400; Referee: Danijel Starčević

==== On-season (2024) ====
22 March 2024 Friendly	Zrinjski Mostar (Bosnia and Herzegovina)	1–1	(Croatia) Hajduk Split	Mostar, Bosnia and Herzegovina
17:30	Ćuže 3'	Report	N. Kalinić 13'; Pukštas (yellow card) 39'	Stadium: Stadion pod Bijelim Brijegom; Attendance: 7,000; Referee: Josip Martinović

=== Croatian Football Super Cup ===
15 July 2023 Final	Dinamo Zagreb	1–0	Hajduk Split	Zagreb
20:00 CEST (UTC+02:00)	Baturina 52'; Livaković (yellow card) 81'	Report	Sigur (yellow card) 54'; Sahiti (yellow card) 81'	Stadium: Stadion Maksimir; Attendance: 17,707; Referee: Dario Bel (Osijek)

=== SuperSport HNL ===
21 July 2023 1	Dinamo Zagreb	1–2	Hajduk Split	Zagreb
20:00 CEST (UTC+02:00)	Petković 35' (penalty missed) 65'; Mišić (yellow card) 75'	Report	Krovinović (yellow card) 37'; Livaja 74'; Šarlija (yellow card) 75'; Dolček (yellow card) 77'; Ferro (yellow card) 90+1'; Pukštas 90+2'	Stadium: Stadion Maksimir; Attendance: 12,428; Referee: Igor Pajač (Sv. Ivan Zelina)

30 July 2023 2	Hajduk Split	1–0	Rijeka	Split
21:05 CEST (UTC+02:00)	Pukštas 50'; Livaja (yellow card) 54'	Report	Hodža (yellow card) 30'; Lepinjica (yellow card) 61'; Selahi (yellow card) 64'; Djouahra (yellow card) 84'	Stadium: Stadion Poljud; Attendance: 32,584; Referee: Patrik Kolarić (Čakovec)

13 August 2023 4	Hajduk Split	3–0	Slaven Belupo	Split
21:05 CEST (UTC+02:00)	Livaja (penalty missed) 38' 55', 63'; Kalik (yellow card) 45+3'; Dajaku 89'	Report	Hoxha (yellow card) 25'; Ortiz (yellow card) 43'	Stadium: Stadion Poljud; Attendance: 25,689; Referee: Zdenko Lovrić (Đakovo)

20 August 2023 5	Rudeš	0–2	Hajduk Split	Zagreb
18:50 CEST (UTC+02:00)	Matić (yellow card) 32'; Lazarov (yellow card) 58'	Report	Livaja 4'; Melnjak 14'; Lauš (yellow card) 90+1'	Stadium: Stadion Kranjčevićeva; Attendance: 4,050; Referee: Patrik Kolarić (Čakovec)

26 August 2023 6	Varaždin	1–2	Hajduk Split	Varaždin
19:00 CEST (UTC+02:00)	Belcar 36'	Report	Krovinović 29'; Sigur (yellow card) 60'; Dajaku 86'	Stadium: Stadion Varteks; Attendance: 7,903; Referee: Fran Jović (Zagreb)

2 September 2023 7	Hajduk Split	0–1	Istra 1961	Split
21:05 CEST (UTC+02:00)	Dolček (yellow card) 84'; Šarlija (yellow card) 90'	Report	Blagojević (yellow card) 16'; Mlinar (yellow card) 68'; Erceg (yellow card) 78'; Lisica 90+12'; Valinčić (yellow card) 90+13'	Stadium: Stadion Poljud; Attendance: 24,893; Referee: Igor Pajač (Sv. Ivan Zelina)

17 September 2023 8	Gorica	2–1	Hajduk Split	Velika Gorica
17:00 CEST (UTC+02:00)	Pršir (yellow card) 63'; Raspopović (yellow card) 74'; Štiglec 87'; Jurić 90+2'	Report	Šarlija 62' (yellow card) 78'	Stadium: Stadion Radnik; Attendance: 4,514; Referee: Dario Bel (Osijek)

23 September 2023 9	Hajduk Split	1–0	Lokomotiva	Split
19:15 CEST (UTC+02:00)	Sahiti (yellow card) 52' (goal) 76'; Krovinović (yellow card) 79'	Report	Mudražija (yellow card) 32'; Mersinaj (yellow card) 80' (yellow-red card) 85'	Stadium: Stadion Poljud; Attendance: 12,404; Referee: Patrik Kolarić (Čakovec)

1 October 2023 10	Hajduk Split	1–0	Dinamo Zagreb	Split
18:00 CEST (UTC+02:00)	Melnjak (yellow card) 29'; Livaja (yellow card) 34'; Šarlija (yellow card) 47'; Sahiti 59'; Žaper (yellow card) 73'	Report	Emreli (yellow card) 25'; Mišić (yellow card) 55'; Baturina (yellow card) 76'	Stadium: Stadion Poljud; Attendance: 33,824; Referee: Igor Pajač (Sv. Ivan Zelina)

7 October 2023 11	Rijeka	1–0	Hajduk Split	Rijeka
18:30 CEST (UTC+02:00)	Janković 63' (pen.)	Report	Odjidja-Ofoe (yellow card) 81'	Stadium: Stadion Rujevica; Attendance: 8,071; Referee: Patrik Kolarić (Čakovec)

22 October 2023 12	Hajduk Split	0–2	Osijek	Split
18:00 CEST (UTC+02:00)	Šarlija (yellow card) 25'; Sigur (yellow card) 32'; Diallo (yellow card) 84'	Report	Gržan (yellow card) 34'; Brlek 46'; Omerović (yellow card) 61'; Lovrić (yellow card) 68'; Lučić 73' (o.g.)	Stadium: Stadion Poljud; Attendance: 22,605; Referee: Fran Jović (Zagreb)

27 October 2023 13	Slaven Belupo	0–1	Hajduk Split	Koprivnica
18:00 CEST (UTC+02:00)	Božić (yellow card) 1'; Hoxha (yellow card) 38'; Lepinjica (yellow card) 56'	Report	Krovinović (yellow card) 58'; Livaja 44' (pen.) (yellow card) 80'	Stadium: Gradski Stadion Ivan Kušek Apaš; Attendance: 3,010; Referee: Mateo Erceg (Benkovac)

4 November 2023 14	Hajduk Split	1–0	Rudeš	Split
18:10 CET (UTC+01:00)	Trajkovski 47'	Report	Kovačević (yellow card) 21'; Bašić (yellow card) 32'	Stadium: Stadion Poljud; Attendance: 13,682; Referee: Dario Bel (Osijek)

8 November 2023 3	Osijek	0–1	Hajduk Split	Osijek
17:00 CET (UTC+01:00)		Report	Sahiti (yellow card) 41'; Livaja 42'	Stadium: Opus Arena; Attendance: 11,105; Referee: Ante Čulina (Zagreb)

12 November 2023 15	Hajduk Split	3–1	Varaždin	Split
16:30 CET (UTC+01:00)	Pukštas 35'; Šarlija 39'; Krovinović 66'	Report	Marina (yellow card) 3'; Uremović 83' (o.g.)	Stadium: Stadion Poljud; Attendance: 14,344; Referee: Patrik Kolarić (Čakovec)

26 November 2023 16	Istra 1961	0–2	Hajduk Split	Pula
15:00 CET (UTC+01:00)	Erceg (yellow card) 39'; Vuk (yellow card) 54'; Kadušić (yellow card) 55'; Devetak (yellow card) 90+2'	Report	Sahiti 16'; Livaja (yellow card) 28' (goal) 90' (pen.); Kalik (yellow card) 90+3'	Stadium: Stadion Aldo Drosina; Attendance: 8,606; Referee: Ante Čulina (Zagreb)

2 December 2023 17	Hajduk Split	3–0	Gorica	Split
17:30 CET (UTC+01:00)	Dajaku 20'; Žaper 64'; Sahiti 69'	Report		Stadium: Stadion Poljud; Attendance: 16,415; Referee: Patrik Kolarić (Čakovec)

8 December 2023 18	Lokomotiva	1–1	Hajduk Split	Zagreb
17:30 CET (UTC+01:00)	Goričan 25'; Bartolec (yellow card) 29'; Mudražija (yellow card) 53'; Šotiček (yellow card) 59'	Report	Diallo (yellow card) 4'; Benrahou 75'; Kalik (yellow card) 86'	Stadium: Stadion Kranjčevićeva; Attendance: 4,829; Referee: Dario Bel (Osijek)

17 December 2023 19	Dinamo Zagreb	0–0	Hajduk Split	Zagreb
17:15 CET (UTC+01:00)	Petković (yellow card) 45+3'; Špikić (yellow card) 60'; Jurić (yellow card) 82'	Report	Pukštas (yellow card) 49'; Diallo (yellow card) 72'	Stadium: Stadion Maksimir; Attendance: 18,313; Referee: Patrik Kolarić (Čakovec)

28 January 2024 20	Hajduk Split	1–2	Rijeka	Split
17:45 CET (UTC+01:00)	Pukštas 15'; Sahiti (yellow card) 37'; Sigur (yellow card) 51'; Uremović (yellow card) 76'; Žaper (yellow card) 87'; Kalik (yellow card) 90+7'; N. Kalinić (yellow card) 90+7'	Report	Smolčić (yellow card) 4'; Radeljić (yellow card) 32'; Selahi (yellow card) 47' (goal) 75'; Obregón 55'; Labrović (yellow card) 90+7'	Stadium: Stadion Poljud; Attendance: 32,621; Referee: Patrik Kolarić (Čakovec)

3 February 2024 21	Osijek	1–1	Hajduk Split	Osijek
17:30 CET (UTC+01:00)	Omerović (yellow card) 57'; Bralić (yellow card) 69'; Miérez 72'; Matković (yellow card) 75'; Pušić (yellow card) 90+3'	Report	Mikanović (yellow card) 28'; Uremović 57' (yellow card) 80'	Stadium: Opus Arena; Attendance: 11,711; Referee: Igor Pajač (Sv. Ivan Zelina)

11 February 2024 22	Hajduk Split	4–0	Slaven Belupo	Split
15:00 CET (UTC+01:00)	Sahiti (yellow card) 40'; N. Kalinić 45+2'; Brekalo 47'; Kalik 50'; Čuić 68'; Uremović (yellow card) 75'	Report	Pllana (yellow card) 51'; Štefulj (yellow card) 65'	Stadium: Stadion Poljud; Attendance: 17,017; Referee: Ante Čulina (Zagreb)

17 February 2024 23	Rudeš	0–2	Hajduk Split	Zagreb
17:10 CET (UTC+01:00)	Šehić (yellow card) 34'; Srbljinović (yellow card) 50'; Babić (yellow card) 90+4'	Report	Livaja 48'; Dajaku 90+7'	Stadium: Stadion Kranjčevićeva; Attendance: 4,475; Referee: Dario Bel (Osijek)

24 February 2024 24	Varaždin	1–1	Hajduk Split	Varaždin
15:00 CET (UTC+01:00)	Dabro (yellow card) 20' (yellow-red card) 52'; Belcar (yellow card) 39' (goal) 40'; Drožđek (yellow card) 84'; Postonjski (yellow card) 90+7'; Zelenika (yellow card) 90+8'	Report	Mikanović (yellow card) 61'; Sigur 66'	Stadium: Stadion Varteks; Attendance: 10,399; Referee: Fran Jović (Zagreb)

2 March 2024 25	Hajduk Split	1–0	Istra 1961	Split
17:10 CET (UTC+01:00)	Krovinović 48'; Sigur (yellow card) 82'; Pukštas (yellow card) 90+7'	Report	Kadušić (yellow card) 25'; Blagojević (yellow card) 84' (yellow-red card) 84'; Erceg (yellow card) 84'	Stadium: Stadion Poljud; Attendance: 18,267; Referee: Zdenko Lovrić (Đakovo)

9 March 2024 26	Gorica	0–3	Hajduk Split	Velika Gorica
17:10 CET (UTC+01:00)	Pršir (yellow card) 4'; Lazarov (yellow card) 45+1'; Munksgaard (yellow card) 52'	Report	Livaja 22'; Benrahou 31'; Pukštas 41'	Stadium: Stadion Radnik; Attendance: 4,749; Referee: Dario Bel (Osijek)

16 March 2024 27	Hajduk Split	1–2	Lokomotiva	Split
17:10 CET (UTC+01:00)	Mikanović (yellow card) 4' (yellow-red card) 23'; Livaja (penalty missed) 55' 90+5'; Kleinheisler (yellow card) 87'; Sigur (yellow card) 89'	Report	Smakaj (yellow card) 6'; Mudražija 26', 60'; Fetai (yellow card) 90+3'	Stadium: Stadion Poljud; Attendance: 22,204; Referee: Igor Pajač (Sv. Ivan Zelina)

30 March 2024 28	Hajduk Split	0–1	Dinamo Zagreb	Split
19:30 CET (UTC+01:00)	Krovinović (yellow card) 41'; Šarlija (yellow card) 52'; N. Kalinić (yellow card) 90'; Kleinheisler (yellow card) 90+1'	Report	Pierre-Gabriel (yellow card) 2'; Kaneko (yellow card) 36'; Petković 38'; Ristovski (yellow card) 43'; Sučić (yellow card) 90+3'	Stadium: Stadion Poljud; Attendance: 31,018; Referee: Daniel Siebert (Germany)

7 April 2024 29	Rijeka	1–0	Hajduk Split	Rijeka
19:30 CEST (UTC+02:00)	Radeljić (yellow card) 57'; Pašalić 70'	Report	Kalik (yellow card) 40'	Stadium: Stadion Rujevica; Attendance: 8,091; Referee: Horațiu Feșnic (Romania)

14 April 2024 30	Hajduk Split	1–2	Osijek	Split
16:30 CEST (UTC+02:00)	Trajkovski 28'; Sahiti (yellow card) 56'; N. Kalinić (yellow card) 81'	Report	Matković 19'; Miérez 42'; Mkrtchyan (yellow card) 71'; Çokaj (yellow card) 82'; Kolić (yellow card) 90+7'	Stadium: Stadion Poljud; Attendance: 0 Referee: Fran Jović (Zagreb)

20 April 2024 31	Slaven Belupo	0–1	Hajduk Split	Koprivnica
19:15 CEST (UTC+02:00)	Šuto (yellow card) 36'; Božić (yellow card) 90+1'	Report	Trajkovski 12'; Moufi (yellow card) 89'; Čuić (yellow card) 90+1'	Stadium: Gradski Stadion Ivan Kušek Apaš; Attendance: 2,500; Referee: Patrik Kolarić (Čakovec)

27 April 2024 32	Hajduk Split	5–1	Rudeš	Split
19:10 CEST (UTC+02:00)	Pukštas 4', 26'; Trajkovski (yellow card) 27'; Krovinović 53', 59'; N. Kalinić 71'	Report	Pukštas 28' (o.g.); Kunert (yellow card) 55'; Šehić (yellow card) 87'	Stadium: Stadion Poljud; Attendance: 0 Referee: Mateo Erceg (Benkovac)

5 May 2024 33	Hajduk Split	0–1	Varaždin	Split
17:00 CEST (UTC+02:00)	Kleinheisler (yellow card) 90+3'	Report	Lusavec (yellow card) 56'; Drožđek 67'	Stadium: Stadion Poljud; Attendance: 12,027; Referee: Toni Dadić (Zagreb)

12 May 2024 34	Istra 1961	1–1	Hajduk Split	Pula
19:10 CEST (UTC+02:00)	Lawal 4'; Blagojević (yellow card) 37'; Majstorović (yellow card) 45+4'; Ćalušić (yellow card) 53'	Report	Perišić 42'; Moufi (yellow card) 45+4'; Sigur (yellow card) 71'; F. Čuić (yellow card) 79'	Stadium: Stadion Aldo Drosina; Attendance: 5,993; Referee: Ante Čulina (Zagreb)

19 May 2024 35	Hajduk Split	2–1	Gorica	Split
17:00 CEST (UTC+02:00)	Trajkovski 30' (yellow card) 60'; Štiglec 64' (o.g.)	Report	Rukavina 23'; Matković (yellow card) 87'	Stadium: Stadion Poljud; Attendance: 10,111; Referee: Tihomir Pejin (Donji Miholjac)

25 May 2024 36	Lokomotiva	2–5	Hajduk Split	Zagreb
19:10 CEST (UTC+02:00)	Šotiček (yellow card) 37'; Jurić-Petrašilo 51' (o.g.); Čop 66'	Report	Trajkovski 18', 38', 72'; Kalaica 47' (o.g.); Brekalo 49'	Stadium: Stadion Kranjčevićeva; Attendance: 2,593; Referee: Dario Bel (Osijek)

=== Croatian Football Cup ===
13 September 2023 R1	Omladinac Gornja Vrba	0–6	Hajduk Split	Slavonski Brod
16:00 CEST (UTC+02:00)	Štefančić (yellow card) 22'; Baričević (yellow card) 44'	Report	Livaja 16'; Odjidja-Ofoe (yellow card) 41'; Dolček 43'; Sahiti 45+1'; Lauš 52'; Benrahou 57', 65'; Žaper (yellow card) 78'	Stadium: ŠRC Stanko Vlainić-Dida; Attendance: 4,500; Referee: Ivana Martinčić (Koprivnica)

31 October 2023 R2	Jadran Luka Ploče	0–2	Hajduk Split	Ploče
14:00 CET (UTC+01:00)	Rodin (yellow card) 35'; Žderić (yellow card) 90'; Listar (yellow card) 90+3'	Report	Martić 73' (o.g.); Pukštas (yellow card) 74'; Diallo (yellow card) 80'; Sahiti 90+2'	Stadium: Jadranovo; Attendance: 4,000; Referee: Dario Kulušić (Šibenik)

27 February 2024 QF	Hajduk Split	5–0	Varaždin	Split
18:00 CET (UTC+01:00)	Kalik (yellow card) 34'; Diallo 42'; Krovinović 45+2'; Kleinheisler 65'; Elez 68' (yellow card) 81'; Livaja 72' (pen.) (yellow card) 80'	Report	Jelenić (yellow card) 45+2'; Lusavec (yellow card) 46'; Mištrafović (yellow card) 70'	Stadium: Stadion Poljud; Attendance: 14,388; Referee: Igor Pajač (Sv. Ivan Zelina)

3 April 2024 SF	Hajduk Split	0–1	Dinamo Zagreb	Split
19:00 CEST (UTC+02:00)	Kleinheisler (yellow card) 45+4'; Sigur (yellow card) 49'	Report	Kulenović 14'; Hoxha (yellow card) 90+5'	Stadium: Stadion Poljud; Attendance: 27,634; Referee: Fabio Maresca (Italy)

=== UEFA Europa Conference League ===
==== Third qualifying round ====
10 August 2023 First leg	Hajduk Split (Croatia)	0–0	(Greece) PAOK	Split, Croatia
21:00 CEST (UTC+02:00)	Sigur (yellow card) 63'	Report	Tsingaras (yellow card) 32'; Brandon (yellow card) 40'; Schwab (yellow card) 82'; Baba (yellow card) 87'	Stadium: Stadion Poljud; Attendance: 33,573; Referee: Morten Krogh (Denmark)

17 August 2023 Second leg	PAOK (Greece)	3–0 (3–0 agg.)	(Croatia) Hajduk Split	Thessaloniki, Greece
20:30 EEST (UTC+03:00)	Schwab 12' (pen.); Baba (yellow card) 52'; Konstantelias (yellow card) 56'; Samatta (yellow card) 75'; A. Živković 79', 85'	Report	Moufi (yellow card) 23'; Šarlija (yellow card) 51'; Odjidja-Ofoe (yellow card) 63'; Diallo (yellow card) 84'; Čuić (yellow card) 89'	Stadium: Toumba Stadium; Attendance: 24,133; Referee: Sascha Stegemann (Germany)

== Player seasonal records ==
Updated 26 May 2024

=== Goals ===
Rank	Name	League	Europe	Cup	Super Cup	Total
1	(Croatia) Marko Livaja	10	–	2	–	12
2	(United States) Rokas Pukštas	7	–	–	–	7
2	(North Macedonia) Aleksandar Trajkovski	7	–	–	–	7
4	(Croatia) Filip Krovinović	5	–	1	–	6
4	(Kosovo) Emir Sahiti	4	–	2	–	6
6	(Germany) Leon Dajaku	4	–	–	–	4
6	(Morocco) Yassine Benrahou	2	–	2	–	4
8	(Croatia) Josip Brekalo	2	–	–	–	2
8	(Croatia) Nikola Kalinić	2	–	–	–	2
8	(Croatia) Zvonimir Šarlija	2	–	–	–	2
11	(Bosnia and Herzegovina) Filip Čuić	1	–	–	–	1
11	(Australia) Anthony Kalik	1	–	–	–	1
11	(Croatia) Dario Melnjak	1	–	–	–	1
11	(Croatia) Ivan Perišić	1	–	–	–	1
11	(Croatia) Niko Sigur	1	–	–	–	1
11	(Croatia) Filip Uremović	1	–	–	–	1
11	(Croatia) Mihael Žaper	1	–	–	–	1
11	(Ivory Coast) Ismaël Diallo	–	–	1	–	1
11	(Croatia) Ivan Dolček	–	–	1	–	1
11	(Croatia) Josip Elez	–	–	1	–	1
11	(Hungary) László Kleinheisler	–	–	1	–	1
11	(Croatia) Tino Blaž Lauš	–	–	1	–	1
Own goals		2	–	1	–	3
TOTALS		54	0	13	0	67

Source: Competitive matches

=== Clean sheets ===
Rank	Name	League	Europe	Cup	Super Cup	Total
1	(Austria) Ivan Lučić	15	1	3	–	19
2	(Croatia) Raul Bezeljak	1	–	–	–	1
2	(Croatia) Borna Buljan	1	–	–	–	1
2	(Croatia) Lovre Kalinić	–	–	1	–	1
TOTALS		17	1	4	0	22

Source: Competitive matches

=== Disciplinary record ===
Number	Position	Player	HNL			Conference League			Croatian Cup			Croatian Super Cup			Total		
Number	Position	Player	Yellow card	(yellow card) (yellow-red card)	Red card	Yellow card	(yellow card) (yellow-red card)	Red card	Yellow card	(yellow card) (yellow-red card)	Red card	Yellow card	(yellow card) (yellow-red card)	Red card	Yellow card	(yellow card) (yellow-red card)	Red card
5	DF	(Ivory Coast) Ismaël Diallo	3	0	0	1	0	0	1	0	0	0	0	0	5	0	0
6	MF	(Croatia) Mihael Žaper	2	0	0	0	0	0	1	0	0	0	0	0	3	0	0
7	MF	(Australia) Anthony Kalik	5	0	0	0	0	0	1	0	0	0	0	0	6	0	0
8	MF	(Belgium) Vadis Odjidja-Ofoe	1	0	0	1	0	0	1	0	0	0	0	0	3	0	0
9	FW	(Croatia) Nikola Kalinić	3	0	0	0	0	0	0	0	0	0	0	0	3	0	0
10	FW	(Croatia) Marko Livaja	4	0	0	0	0	0	1	0	0	0	0	0	5	0	0
17	DF	(Croatia) Dario Melnjak	1	0	0	0	0	0	0	0	0	0	0	0	1	0	0
18	DF	(Morocco) Fahd Moufi	2	0	0	1	0	0	0	0	0	0	0	0	3	0	0
19	DF	(Croatia) Josip Elez	0	0	0	0	0	0	1	0	0	0	0	0	1	0	0
20	MF	(Croatia) Niko Sigur	6	0	0	1	0	0	1	0	0	1	0	0	9	0	0
21	MF	(United States) Rokas Pukštas	2	0	0	0	0	0	1	0	0	0	0	0	3	0	0
23	MF	(Croatia) Filip Krovinović	4	0	0	0	0	0	0	0	0	0	0	0	4	0	0
24	DF	(Croatia) Dino Mikanović	2	1	0	0	0	0	0	0	0	0	0	0	2	1	0
25	DF	(Croatia) Filip Uremović	3	0	0	0	0	0	0	0	0	0	0	0	3	0	0
26	FW	(Croatia) Ivan Dolček	2	0	0	0	0	0	0	0	0	0	0	0	2	0	0
27	FW	(North Macedonia) Aleksandar Trajkovski	2	0	0	0	0	0	0	0	0	0	0	0	2	0	0
30	MF	(Hungary) László Kleinheisler	3	0	0	0	0	0	1	0	0	0	0	0	4	0	0
31	DF	(Croatia) Zvonimir Šarlija	6	0	0	1	0	0	0	0	0	0	0	0	7	0	0
36	MF	(Croatia) Tino Blaž Lauš	1	0	0	0	0	0	0	0	0	0	0	0	1	0	0
77	FW	(Kosovo) Emir Sahiti	5	0	0	0	0	0	0	0	0	1	0	0	6	0	0
97	DF	(Portugal) Ferro	1	0	0	0	0	0	0	0	0	0	0	0	1	0	0
99	FW	(Bosnia and Herzegovina) Filip Čuić	2	0	0	1	0	0	0	0	0	0	0	0	3	0	0
TOTALS			60	1	0	6	0	0	9	0	0	2	0	0	77	1	0

=== Appearances and goals ===
Number	Position	Player	Apps	Goals	Apps	Goals	Apps	Goals	Apps	Goals	Apps	Goals
Number	Position	Player	Total		HNL (Note: First number represents appearances in starting eleven, while the second number indicates a substitute appearance.)		Conference League		Croatian Cup		Croatian Super Cup	
3	DF	(Croatia) Dominik Prpić	10	0	5+4	0	0+0	0	1+0	0	0+0	0
4	FW	(Croatia) Ivan Perišić	8	1	2+5	1	0+0	0	0+1	0	0+0	0
5	DF	(Ivory Coast) Ismaël Diallo	28	1	22+2	0	1+1	0	2+0	1	0+0	0
6	MF	(Croatia) Mihael Žaper	15	1	10+3	1	0+0	0	0+2	0	0+0	0
7	MF	(Australia) Anthony Kalik	28	1	9+15	1	0+1	0	3+0	0	0+0	0
8	MF	(Belgium) Vadis Odjidja-Ofoe	30	0	7+18	0	2+0	0	1+1	0	0+1	0
9	FW	(Croatia) Nikola Kalinić	11	2	3+7	2	0+0	0	1+0	0	0+0	0
10	FW	(Croatia) Marko Livaja	30	12	24+1	10	2+0	0	3+0	2	0+0	0
11	MF	(Morocco) Yassine Benrahou	30	4	15+9	2	0+1	0	3+1	2	1+0	0
13	GK	(Austria) Ivan Lučić	34	0	28+0	0	2+0	0	2+1	0	1+0	0
17	DF	(Croatia) Dario Melnjak	17	1	12+1	1	2+0	0	1+0	0	1+0	0
18	DF	(Morocco) Fahd Moufi	34	0	17+11	0	2+0	0	1+2	0	0+1	0
19	DF	(Croatia) Josip Elez	18	1	8+8	0	0+0	0	0+2	1	0+0	0
20	MF	(Croatia) Niko Sigur	39	1	32+2	1	2+0	0	2+0	0	1+0	0
21	MF	(United States) Rokas Pukštas	32	7	28+0	7	0+0	0	0+3	0	1+0	0
22	FW	(Germany) Leon Dajaku	26	4	6+17	4	0+1	0	1+0	0	1+0	0
23	MF	(Croatia) Filip Krovinović	41	6	34+1	5	2+0	0	3+0	1	1+0	0
24	DF	(Croatia) Dino Mikanović	17	0	5+7	0	0+2	0	3+0	0	0+0	0
25	DF	(Croatia) Filip Uremović	27	1	24+0	1	0+0	0	3+0	0	0+0	0
26	FW	(Croatia) Ivan Dolček	14	1	4+6	0	0+2	0	1+0	1	1+0	0
27	FW	(North Macedonia) Aleksandar Trajkovski	19	7	9+8	7	0+0	0	1+1	0	0+0	0
28	MF	(Croatia) Roko Brajković	3	0	1+1	0	0+0	0	0+1	0	0+0	0
29	FW	(Slovenia) Jan Mlakar	7	0	3+1	0	2+0	0	0+0	0	1+0	0
30	MF	(Hungary) László Kleinheisler	14	1	4+8	0	0+0	0	1+1	1	0+0	0
31	DF	(Croatia) Zvonimir Šarlija	35	2	28+0	2	2+0	0	4+0	0	1+0	0
32	DF	(Croatia) Šimun Hrgović	9	0	2+6	0	0+0	0	1+0	0	0+0	0
34	FW	(Croatia) Bruno Durdov	2	0	0+2	0	0+0	0	0+0	0	0+0	0
35	MF	(Croatia) Luka Jurak	3	0	2+1	0	0+0	0	0+0	0	0+0	0
36	DF	(Croatia) Mateo Jurić-Petrašilo	1	0	1+0	0	0+0	0	0+0	0	0+0	0
36	MF	(Croatia) Tino Blaž Lauš	5	1	0+3	0	0+0	0	1+1	1	0+0	0
37	MF	(Croatia) Noa Skoko	3	0	0+3	0	0+0	0	0+0	0	0+0	0
38	FW	(Croatia) Mateo Bačić	1	0	0+1	0	0+0	0	0+0	0	0+0	0
40	GK	(Croatia) Borna Buljan	7	0	7+0	0	0+0	0	0+0	0	0+0	0
41	GK	(Croatia) Raul Bezeljak	1	0	0+1	0	0+0	0	0+0	0	0+0	0
70	FW	(Croatia) Josip Brekalo	16	2	12+2	2	0+0	0	2+0	0	0+0	0
77	MF	(Kosovo) Emir Sahiti	38	6	29+3	4	2+0	0	1+2	2	0+1	0
91	GK	(Croatia) Lovre Kalinić	3	0	1+0	0	0+0	0	2+0	0	0+0	0
97	DF	(Portugal) Ferro	7	0	2+3	0	1+0	0	0+0	0	1+0	0
99	FW	(Bosnia and Herzegovina) Filip Čuić	10	1	0+7	1	0+1	0	0+1	0	0+1	0

== Transfers ==
=== In ===
Date	Position	Player	From	Fee
15 June 2023	DF	(Croatia) Zvonimir Šarlija	(Greece) Panathinaikos	Free
26 June 2023	FW	(Germany) Leon Dajaku	(England) Sunderland	Free
30 June 2023	GK	(Croatia) Toni Silić	(Croatia) Dugopolje	Loan ended
30 June 2023	DF	(Croatia) Ivan Dominić	(Finland) KuPS	Recalled from loan
30 June 2023	DF	(Croatia) Luka Škaričić	(Croatia) Varaždin	Loan ended
30 June 2023	MF	(Croatia) Josip Vuković	(Saudi Arabia) Al Faisaly	Loan ended
30 June 2023	MF	(Bosnia and Herzegovina) Madžid Šošić	(Slovenia) Radomlje	Loan ended
30 June 2023	MF	(Croatia) Mario Čuić	(Slovenia) Radomlje	Loan ended
30 June 2023	FW	(Bosnia and Herzegovina) Filip Čuić	(Slovenia) Radomlje	Loan ended
30 June 2023	MF	(Croatia) Tino Blaž Lauš	(Bosnia and Herzegovina) Velež Mostar	Loan ended
30 June 2023	MF	(Croatia) Franjo Lazar	(Croatia) Orijent	Loan ended
30 June 2023	FW	(Croatia) Ivan Dolček	(Croatia) Šibenik	Loan ended
30 June 2023	FW	(Croatia) Ivo Čengić	(Croatia) Dugopolje	Loan ended
30 June 2023	FW	(Croatia) Leonardo Petrović	(Croatia) Jadran LP	Loan ended
11 July 2023	DF	(Morocco) Fahd Moufi	(Portugal) Portimonense	Free
12 July 2023	DF	(Ivory Coast) Ismaël Diallo	(France) Ajaccio	Free
12 July 2023	MF	(Belgium) Vadis Odjidja-Ofoe	(Belgium) Gent	Free
31 August 2023	DF	(Croatia) Filip Uremović	(Germany) Hertha BSC	Free
1 September 2023	DF	(Kosovo) Elvis Letaj	(Slovenia) Radomlje	Recalled from loan
4 September 2023	MF	(Croatia) Mihael Žaper	(Croatia) Osijek	1,000,000 €
15 September 2023	FW	(North Macedonia) Aleksandar Trajkovski	(Saudi Arabia) Al-Fayha	Free
2 January 2024	MF	(Hungary) László Kleinheisler	(Greece) Panathinaikos	Loan
3 January 2024	DF	(Croatia) Dominik Prpić	(Slovenia) Radomlje	Loan ended
3 January 2024	FW	(Croatia) Nikola Kalinić	Free agent	Free
19 January 2024	FW	(Croatia) Ivan Perišić	(England) Tottenham Hotspur	Loan
21 January 2024	FW	(Croatia) Jere Vrcić	(Bosnia and Herzegovina) Široki Brijeg	Recalled from loan
25 January 2024	GK	(Croatia) Karlo Sentić	(Hungary) Diósgyőri VTK	Recalled from loan
29 January 2024	FW	(Croatia) Josip Brekalo	(Italy) Fiorentina	Loan (fee: 100,000 €)

Total Spending: ▼1,100,000 €

=== Out ===
Date	Position	Player	To	Fee
1 June 2023	GK	(Croatia) Danijel Subašić		Retired
1 June 2023	DF	(Croatia) Toni Borevković	(Portugal) Vitória S.C.	Loan ended
1 June 2023	DF	(Hungary) Gergő Lovrencsics	(Croatia) Solin	End of contract
1 June 2023	DF	(Czech Republic) Stefan Simić	(Spain) Eibar	End of contract
1 June 2023	MF	(United States) Agustin Anello	(Belgium) Lommel	Loan ended
1 June 2023	MF	(Italy) Marco Fossati	(Romania) Universitatea Cluj	End of contract
15 June 2023	GK	(Croatia) Karlo Sentić	(Hungary) Diósgyőri VTK	Loan
19 June 2023	MF	(Croatia) Ivan Ćalušić	(Croatia) Istra 1961	Free
30 June 2023	DF	(Nigeria) Chidozie Awaziem	(Portugal) Boavista	Loan ended
30 June 2023	FW	(Croatia) Ivo Čengić	(Croatia) Hrvatski Dragovoljac	End of contract
30 June 2023	FW	(Croatia) Nikola Kalinić		End of contract
1 July 2023	DF	(Croatia) Tvrtko Buljan	(Bosnia and Herzegovina) Široki Brijeg	End of contract
1 July 2023	MF	(Croatia) Franjo Lazar	(Croatia) Orijent	End of contract
1 July 2023	FW	(Croatia) Leonardo Petrović	(Bosnia and Herzegovina) Posušje	End of contract
4 July 2023	MF	(Croatia) Ivan Krolo	(Slovenia) Radomlje	Loan
4 July 2023	MF	(Croatia) Josip Vuković	(Turkey) Pendikspor	Free (released)
5 July 2023	MF	(Croatia) Mario Čuić	(Croatia) Istra 1961	Free
20 July 2023	DF	(Kosovo) Elvis Letaj	(Slovenia) Radomlje	Loan
20 July 2023	DF	(Croatia) Luka Škaričić	(Croatia) Varaždin	Undisclosed
1 August 2023	MF	(Croatia) Marko Capan	(Bosnia and Herzegovina) Široki Brijeg	Loan
1 August 2023	FW	(Croatia) Jere Vrcić	(Bosnia and Herzegovina) Široki Brijeg	Loan
4 August 2023	MF	(Austria) Lukas Grgić	(Austria) Rapid Wien	750,000 €
7 August 2023	GK	(Croatia) Borna Buljan	(Croatia) Solin	Dual registration
7 August 2023	MF	(Croatia) Roko Brajković	(Croatia) Solin	Dual registration
7 August 2023	MF	(Croatia) Ivan Ćubelić	(Croatia) Solin	Dual registration
7 August 2023	FW	(Bosnia and Herzegovina) Filip Čuić	(Croatia) Solin	Dual registration
9 August 2023	DF	(Croatia) Ivan Dominić	(Croatia) Dubrava	Free (released)
13 August 2023	MF	(Bosnia and Herzegovina) Madžid Šošić	(Slovenia) Radomlje	Loan
27 August 2023	FW	(Slovenia) Jan Mlakar	(Italy) Pisa	3,500,000 €
30 August 2023	GK	(Croatia) Toni Silić	(Moldova) Sheriff Tiraspol	Loan
1 September 2023	DF	(Croatia) Dominik Prpić	(Slovenia) Radomlje	Loan
9 January 2024	MF	(Croatia) Tino Blaž Lauš	(Slovenia) Koper	Loan
21 January 2024	FW	(Croatia) Ivan Dolček	(Slovakia) DAC Dunajská Streda	325,000 €
21 January 2024	FW	(Croatia) Jere Vrcić	(Croatia) Solin	Dual registration
31 January 2024	DF	(Croatia) Luka Vušković	(Poland) Radomiak Radom	Loan
2 February 2024	GK	(Croatia) Karlo Sentić	(Kazakhstan) Ordabasy	Loan
13 February 2024	DF	(Croatia) Mateo Jurić-Petrašilo	(Croatia) Solin	Dual registration
13 February 2024	FW	(Croatia) Jere Vrcić	(Croatia) Solin	Dual registration
15 February 2024	GK	(Ukraine) Davyd Fesyuk	Croatia Zmijavci	Loan
15 February 2024	DF	(Kosovo) Elvis Letaj	(Slovenia) Radomlje	Loan

Total Income: ▲4,575,000 €

Total expenditure: ▲3,475,000 €

=== Promoted from youth squad ===
Position	Player	Age
GK	(Croatia) Borna Buljan	18
MF	(Croatia) Tino Blaž Lauš	22
FW	(Bosnia and Herzegovina) Filip Čuić	20
DF	(Croatia) Šimun Hrgović	19
MF	(Croatia) Noa Skoko	18
MF	(Croatia) Luka Jurak	18
