= 2024–25 HNK Hajduk Split season =

Hajduk Split
2024–25 season
- Chairman: Ivan Bilić
- Manager: Gennaro Gattuso
- HNL: 3rd
- Croatian Cup: Quarter-finals
- Conference League: Third qualifying round
- Top goalscorer: League: Marko Livaja (19); All: Marko Livaja (21)
- Highest home attendance: 33,502 (vs. Dinamo Zagreb) (1 December 2024)
- Lowest home attendance: 15,911 (vs. Varaždin) (8 February 2025)
- Average home league attendance: 22,028
Home colours	Away colours	Third colours

The 2024–25 season was the 114th season in Hajduk Split’s history and their thirty-fourth in the HNL.

== First-team squad ==
For details of former players, see List of HNK Hajduk Split players.

As of 17 February 2025

Note: Flags indicate national team as defined under FIFA eligibility rules; some limited exceptions apply. Players may hold more than one non-FIFA nationality.

No.	Pos.	Nation	Player
3	DF	CRO	Dominik Prpić
5	DF	CIV	Ismaël Diallo
6	MF	CRO	Mihael Žaper
7	MF	AUS	Anthony Kalik
8	MF	CAN	Niko Sigur
9	FW	MKD	Aleksandar Trajkovski
10	FW	CRO	Marko Livaja (vice-captain)
11	MF	CRO	Ivan Rakitić
13	GK	AUT	Ivan Lučić
15	FW	CRO	Michele Šego
17	DF	CRO	Dario Melnjak
19	DF	CRO	Josip Elez
21	MF	USA	Rokas Pukštas
23	MF	CRO	Filip Krovinović (3rd captain)
24	FW	GAM	Abdoulie Sanyang

No.	Pos.	Nation	Player
25	DF	CRO	Filip Uremović
26	MF	CRO	Marko Capan
27	FW	CRO	Stipe Biuk (on loan from Real Valladolid)
28	FW	CRO	Roko Brajković
29	FW	SLO	Jan Mlakar (on loan from Pisa)
32	DF	CRO	Šimun Hrgović
33	GK	CRO	Toni Silić
34	FW	CRO	Bruno Durdov
36	DF	CRO	Marino Skelin
37	MF	CRO	Noa Skoko
38	DF	CRO	Luka Hodak
43	DF	CRO	Niko Đolonga
77	FW	UKR	Nazariy Rusyn (on loan from Sunderland)
91	GK	CRO	Lovre Kalinić (captain)

== Competitions ==
=== Overview ===
Competition	First match	Last match	Starting round	Final position	Record							
Competition	First match	Last match	Starting round	Final position	Pld	W	D	L	GF	GA	GD	Win %
SuperSport HNL	4 August 2024	25 May 2025	Matchday 1	3rd	36	17	12	7	49	34	+15	47.22
Croatian Cup	17 September 2024	26 February 2025	First Round	Quarter-finals	3	2	0	1	8	3	+5	66.67
Conference League	25 July 2024	15 August 2024	Second qualifying round	Third qualifying round	4	1	2	1	2	1	+1	25.00
Total					43	20	14	9	59	38	+21	46.51

Last updated: 25 May 2025
Source: Soccerway

=== SuperSport HNL ===
==== Classification ====
Pos	Team	Pld	W	D	L	GF	GA	GD	Pts	Qualification or relegation (Note: The 2024–25 Croatian Football Cup winners qualify for the Europa League first qualifying round (or the second-placed team if the Croatian Cup winners finish first). If the Croatian Cup winners finish in the top three, the second Conference League second qualifying round spot will be passed to the fourth-placed team.)
1	Rijeka (C)	36	18	11	7	49	21	+28	65 (Note: Head to head points (GD) = Rijeka 5 (+3), Dinamo Zagreb 5 (-3).)	Qualification to Champions League second qualifying round
2	Dinamo Zagreb	36	19	8	9	69	41	+28	65	Qualification to Europa League league phase
3	Hajduk Split	36	17	12	7	49	34	+15	63	Qualification to Conference League second qualifying round
4	Varaždin	36	11	16	9	28	24	+4	49	Qualification to Conference League second qualifying round
5	Slaven Belupo	36	13	9	14	42	45	−3	48	

Source: SuperSport HNL
Rules for classification: 1) Points; 2) Head-to-head points; 3) Head-to-head goal difference; 4) Head-to-head goals scored (at home if two teams tied); 5) Goal difference; 6) Goals scored; 7) Play-off
(Note: Criteria 2-4 and 7 is only used if deciding champion, teams to international competition or teams for relegation and in that case criteria 6 will not be used).
(C) Champions

==== Results summary ====
Overall								Home						Away					
Pld	W	D	L	GF	GA	GD	Pts	W	D	L	GF	GA	GD	W	D	L	GF	GA	GD
36	17	12	7	49	34	+15	63	12	4	2	31	14	+17	5	8	5	18	20	−2

Last updated: 25 May 2025.
Source: SuperSport HNL

==== Results by round ====
Round	1	2	3	4	5	6	7	8	9	10	11	12	13	14	15	16	17	18	19	20	21	22	23	24	25	26	27	28	29	30	31	32	33	34	35	36
Ground	H	A	H	A	H	A	H	A	H	A	H	A	H	A	H	A	H	A	H	A	H	A	H	A	H	A	H	A	H	A	H	A	H	A	H	A
Result	W	D	W	D	W	W	W	D	W	W	W	L	D	D	W	L	D	W	D	L	W	D	W	D	W	L	W	W	D	D	L	L	L	D	W	W
Position	3	4	3	4	3	2	2	2	1	1	1	1	1	1	1	2	2	2	2	2	1	2	2	2	1	2	1	1	2	2	2	2	3	3	3	3

Updated to match(es) played on 25 May 2025. Source: SuperSport HNL
A = Away; H = Home; W = Win; D = Draw; L = Loss

==== Results by opponent ====
Team	Results				Points
Team	1	2	3	4	Points
Dinamo Zagreb	1–0	1–0	2–2	1–3	7
Gorica	4–1	0–1	2–1	1-1	7
Istra 1961	1–1	1–1	1–1	0–1	3
Lokomotiva	1–1	2–1	2–3	1–1	5
Osijek	1–0	2–2	4–0	0–2	7
Rijeka	0–0	2–2	0–3	2-1	5
Šibenik	4–0	2–1	1–0	1-0	12
Slaven Belupo	2–1	2–0	0–0	1–0	10
Varaždin	2–1	0–1	1–0	1–1	7

Source: 2024–25 Croatian Football League article

== Matches ==
=== Friendlies ===
==== Pre-season ====
24 June 2024 Friendly	Hajduk Split (Croatia)	3–0	(Bosnia and Herzegovina) Velež Mostar	Split, Croatia
18:00	Durdov 53'; Livaja 74' (pen.), 75'	Report		Stadium: Stadion Poljud (training ground); Attendance: 0 Referee: Karlo Marić

29 June 2024 Friendly	Hajduk Split (Croatia)	1–0	(Bosnia and Herzegovina) Posušje	Split, Croatia
17:00	Skoko 86'	Report		Stadium: Stadion Poljud (training ground); Attendance: 0 Referee: Ante Terzić

3 July 2024 Friendly	Radomlje (Slovenia)	1–0	(Croatia) Hajduk Split	Radomlje, Slovenia
17:30	Štorman 39'	Report	Elez (yellow card) 37'; Kalik (yellow card) 51'	Stadium: Sports park Radomlje; Attendance: 0 Referee: Jure Žagar

6 July 2024 Friendly	Shakhtar Donetsk (Ukraine)	1–1	(Croatia) Hajduk Split	Kranj, Slovenia
18:30	Traoré 29'	Report	Sahiti 13'	Stadium: Stanko Mlakar Stadium; Attendance: 0 Referee: David Šmajc

9 July 2024 Friendly	Rukh Lviv (Ukraine)	1–3	(Croatia) Hajduk Split	Radomlje, Slovenia
11:30	Prytula 62'	Report	Šošić 35'; Durdov 66'; Skoko 72'	Stadium: Sports park Radomlje; Attendance: 0 Referee: Amel Begić

10 July 2024 Friendly	Fenerbahçe (Turkey)	0–1	(Croatia) Hajduk Split	Graz, Austria
19:00	Djiku (yellow card) 31'; Elmaz (yellow card) 66'	Report	Đolonga (yellow card) 28'; Livaja (yellow card) 31'; Pukštas (yellow card) 69'; Durdov 85'; Moufi (yellow card) 88'	Stadium: Liebenauer Stadium; Attendance: 3,500; Referee: Christian-Petru Ciochirca

18 July 2024 Friendly	Hajduk Split	2–0	Croatia Zmijavci	Split, Croatia
10:00	Pukštas 31'; Brajković 67'	Report		Stadium: Stadion Poljud (training ground); Attendance: 0 Referee: Duje Strukan

18 July 2024 Friendly	Hajduk Split (Croatia)	3–0	(Bosnia and Herzegovina) Široki Brijeg	Split, Croatia
18:30	Capan 45+2' (yellow card) 64'; Šošić 58'; Brajković 76'	Report		Stadium: Stadion Poljud; Attendance: 0 Referee: Ante Jurić

==== Mid-season ====
9 January 2025 Friendly	Osnabrück (Germany)	0–1	(Croatia) Hajduk Split	Algorfa, Spain
14:00		Report	Livaja 24'; Kalik (yellow card) 31'	Stadium: La Finca Resort; Attendance: 0 Referee: Juan José Lidón Rocamora

14 January 2025 Friendly	Újpest (Hungary)	2–1	(Croatia) Hajduk Split	San Pedro del Pinatar, Spain
16:00	Dénes (yellow card) 51'; Brodić (yellow card) 58'; Karamoko 68', 78'	Report	Brajković 13'; Mlačić (yellow card) 90+3'	Stadium: Pinatar Arena; Attendance: 150; Referee: Clemente Ortuno

15 January 2025 Friendly	Real Murcia (Spain)	1–0	(Croatia) Hajduk Split	San Pedro del Pinatar, Spain
11:00	Carrillo 23'	Report	Kalik (yellow card) 62'	Stadium: Pinatar Arena; Attendance: 80; Referee: Ojaos Valera

=== SuperSport HNL ===
4 August 2024 1	Hajduk Split	2–1	Slaven Belupo	Split
21:00 CEST (UTC+02:00)	Livaja 18' (pen.); Sanyang 37'; Rakitić (yellow card) 59'; Kalik (yellow card) 82'	Report	Boras (yellow card) 27'; Šakota 45+1'; Agbekpornu (yellow card) 63'; L. Lučić (yellow card) 72' (yellow-red card) 90+1'; Jelić Balta (yellow card) 85'	Stadium: Stadion Poljud; Attendance: 26,189; Referee: Zdenko Lovrić (Đakovo)

11 August 2024 2	Lokomotiva	1–1	Hajduk Split	Zagreb
18:30 CEST (UTC+02:00)	Goričan (yellow card) 90+7'; Čop 90+7' (pen.)	Report	Šarlija (yellow card) 43'; Uremović (yellow card) 48'; Trajkovski 80'; Sigur (yellow card) 90+7'; Pukštas (yellow card) 90+7'	Stadium: Stadion Kranjčevićeva; Attendance: 2,845; Referee: Dario Bel (Osijek)

18 August 2024 3	Hajduk Split	2–1	Varaždin	Split
18:50 CEST (UTC+02:00)	Prpić (yellow card) 20'; Pukštas (yellow card) 25'; Krovinović 56'; Livaja 74'; Uremović (yellow card) 90+1'	Report	Mitrovski 9'; Ba (yellow card) 33'	Stadium: Stadion Poljud; Attendance: 16,809; Referee: Igor Pajač (Sv. Ivan Zelina)

25 August 2024 4	Istra 1961	1–1	Hajduk Split	Pula
18:15 CEST (UTC+02:00)	Heister 1'; Ivanišević (yellow card) 37'; Petrusenko (yellow card) 73'	Report	Livaja 60'; Uremović (yellow card) 90+2'	Stadium: Stadion Aldo Drosina; Attendance: 7,443; Referee: Tihomir Pejin (Donji Miholjac)

31 August 2024 5	Hajduk Split	1–0	Osijek	Split
20:45 CEST (UTC+02:00)	Durdov (yellow card) 34'; Livaja 56'; Rakitić (yellow card) 75'; Lučić (yellow card) 82'	Report	Hasić (yellow card) 59'	Stadium: Stadion Poljud; Attendance: 17,137; Referee: Mario Zebec (Cestica)

13 September 2024 6	Dinamo Zagreb	0–1	Hajduk Split	Zagreb
20:00 CEST (UTC+02:00)	Théophile-Catherine (yellow card) 55'; Ristovski (yellow card) 61'	Report	Livaja (yellow card) 38' (goal) 70'; Šarlija (yellow card) 38'; Diallo (yellow card) 53' (yellow-red card) 90+4'; Pukštas (yellow card) 63'; Biuk (yellow card) 90+13'	Stadium: Stadion Maksimir; Attendance: 20,948; Referee: Igor Pajač (Sv. Ivan Zelina)

21 September 2024 7	Hajduk Split	4–1	Gorica	Split
20:00 CEST (UTC+02:00)	Durdov 11', 55'; Diallo (yellow card) 43'; Livaja 71' (pen.); Sigur 74'	Report	Prpić 5' (o.g.); Ndockyt (yellow card) 55'	Stadium: Stadion Poljud; Attendance: 18,764; Referee: Dario Bel (Osijek)

29 September 2024 8	Rijeka	0–0	Hajduk Split	Rijeka
20:00 CEST (UTC+02:00)		Report	Uremović (yellow card) 53'	Stadium: Stadion Rujevica; Attendance: 7,505; Referee: Ante Čulina (Zagreb)

6 October 2024 9	Hajduk Split	4–0	Šibenik	Split
18:30 CEST (UTC+02:00)	Rakitić 2'; Durdov 18'; Diallo (yellow card) 45+1'; Kalik 62'; Livaja 88'	Report	Perić (yellow card) 17'	Stadium: Stadion Poljud; Attendance: 21,538; Referee: Patrik Kolarić (Čakovec)

20 October 2024 10	Slaven Belupo	0–2	Hajduk Split	Koprivnica
16:00 CEST (UTC+02:00)	Nestorovski (yellow card) 44'; Čović (yellow card) 45+1'; Ćubelić (yellow card) 67'	Report	Božić 39' (o.g.); Uremović (yellow card) 42'; Biuk 44'	Stadium: Gradski Stadion Ivan Kušek Apaš; Attendance: 3,200; Referee: Ante Čulina (Zagreb)

26 October 2024 11	Hajduk Split	2–1	Lokomotiva	Split
16:00 CEST (UTC+02:00)	Livaja 7'; Šarlija (yellow card) 59'; Sigur 76'; Kalinić (yellow card) 90'	Report	Čop 27'; Fetai (yellow card) 48'; Kolinger (yellow card) 51'; Bošković (yellow card) 67'; Leovac (yellow card) 77'	Stadium: Stadion Poljud; Attendance: 22,784; Referee: Mateo Erceg (Benkovac)

3 November 2024 12	Varaždin	1–0	Hajduk Split	Varaždin
17:30 CET (UTC+01:00)	Šego 43'; Belcar (yellow card) 75'	Report	Biuk (yellow card) 20'; Sigur (yellow card) 41'; Diallo (yellow card) 84'; Livaja (yellow card) 90+2'	Stadium: Stadion Varteks; Attendance: 10,428; Referee: Patrik Kolarić (Čakovec)

9 November 2024 13	Hajduk Split	1–1	Istra 1961	Split
17:30 CET (UTC+01:00)	Benrahou 85'	Report	Biyogo Poko (yellow card) 36'; Lisica 67'; Lekweiry (yellow card) 73'; Čuić (yellow card) 81'	Stadium: Stadion Poljud; Attendance: 18,720; Referee: Toni Dadić (Zagreb)

24 November 2024 14	Osijek	2–2	Hajduk Split	Osijek
15:00 CET (UTC+01:00)	Jelenić 41'; Jurišić (yellow card) 45+1'; Jakupović 58'; Jugović (yellow card) 86'; Matković (yellow card) 90+8'	Report	Livaja 9'; Šarlija (yellow card) 27'; Kalik (yellow card) 38'; Uremović 84'	Stadium: Opus Arena; Attendance: 11,532; Referee: Ante Čulina (Zagreb)

1 December 2024 15	Hajduk Split	1–0	Dinamo Zagreb	Split
17:45 CET (UTC+01:00)	Sigur 55'; Kalik (yellow card) 68'; Diallo (yellow card) 90+2'; Uremović (yellow card) 90+5'; Kalinić (yellow card) 90+5'; Lučić (yellow card) 90+6'	Report	Ristovski (yellow card) 28'; Rog (red card) 88'; Pierre-Gabriel (yellow card) 90+5'	Stadium: Stadion Poljud; Attendance: 33,502; Referee: Patrik Kolarić (Čakovec)

7 December 2024 16	Gorica	1–0	Hajduk Split	Velika Gorica
17:30 CET (UTC+01:00)	Kolar (yellow card) 48'; Krizmanić 50'; Pavlović (yellow card) 85'	Report	Šarlija (yellow card) 66'; Livaja (penalty missed) 90+5'	Stadium: Stadion Radnik; Attendance: 5,146; Referee: Dario Bel (Osijek)

15 December 2024 17	Hajduk Split	2–2	Rijeka	Split
17:45 CET (UTC+01:00)	Kalik 7', 36' (yellow card) 44'; Rakitić (yellow card) 64'	Report	Janković 12'; Devetak (yellow card) 44'; Majstorović (yellow card) 44'; Selahi 47' (yellow card) 48'; Petrovič (yellow card) 59'; Galešić (yellow card) 90+3'	Stadium: Stadion Poljud; Attendance: 29,489; Referee: Mateo Erceg (Benkovac)

22 December 2024 18	Šibenik	1–2	Hajduk Split	Šibenik
17:30 CET (UTC+01:00)	Kavelj (yellow card) 39' (yellow-red card) 48'; Agyemang (yellow card) 63' (yellow-red card) 90+6'; Božić (yellow card) 66'; Pozo (yellow card) 67'; Kulušić 89'; Majić (yellow card) 90+6'	Report	Uremović (yellow card) 12'; Prpić (yellow card) 63'; Livaja 74'; Krovinović 90+1'	Stadium: Stadion Šubićevac; Attendance: 3,083; Referee: Ante Čulina (Zagreb)

26 January 2025 19	Hajduk Split	0–0	Slaven Belupo	Split
17:30 CET (UTC+01:00)	Sanyang (yellow card) 31'	Report	Bosec (yellow card) 26'; Nestorovski (yellow card) 35'; Caimacov (yellow card) 68'; Šakota (yellow card) 84'	Stadium: Stadion Poljud; Attendance: 20,227; Referee: Mateo Erceg (Benkovac)

2 February 2025 20	Lokomotiva	3–2	Hajduk Split	Zagreb
12:50 CET (UTC+01:00)	Mudražija 24', 72'; Vuković 25'; Pajač (yellow card) 56'; Andrić (yellow card) 62'; Fetai (yellow card) 64'; Šubarić (yellow card) 90+7'	Report	Diallo 14'; Biuk (yellow card) 43'; Livaja 53'	Stadium: Stadion Kranjčevićeva; Attendance: 3,759; Referee: Patrik Kolarić (Čakovec)

8 February 2025 21	Hajduk Split	1–0	Varaždin	Split
17:30 CET (UTC+01:00)	Livaja 10' (pen.); Prpić (yellow card) 11'; Kalik (yellow card) 61'; Diallo (yellow card) 85'	Report	Tepšić (yellow card) 59'	Stadium: Stadion Poljud; Attendance: 15,911; Referee: Dario Bel (Osijek)

15 February 2025 22	Istra 1961	1–1	Hajduk Split	Pula
15:00 CET (UTC+01:00)	Rozić 13' (yellow card) 79'; Heister (yellow card) 18'; Maurić (yellow card) 56'; Bogdan (yellow card) 57'; Marešić (yellow card) 74'	Report	Sanyang 29'; Sigur (yellow card) 56'; Uremović (yellow card) 72'	Stadium: Stadion Aldo Drosina; Attendance: 7,010; Referee: Igor Pajač (Sv. Ivan Zelina)

22 February 2025 23	Hajduk Split	4–0	Osijek	Split
15:00 CET (UTC+01:00)	Uremović 11'; Livaja 19', 24'; Diallo (yellow card) 53'; Durdov (yellow card) 55'; Biuk 89'	Report	Guedes (yellow card) 44'; Živković (yellow card) 54'	Stadium: Stadion Poljud; Attendance: 17,451; Referee: Ante Čulina (Zagreb)

2 March 2025 24	Dinamo Zagreb	2–2	Hajduk Split	Zagreb
15:00 CET (UTC+01:00)	Baturina 5'; Pierre-Gabriel 48'; Ristovski (yellow card) 55' (yellow-red card) 62'; Galešić (red card) 90+9'	Report	Pukštas (yellow card) 12'; Franjić 31' (o.g.); Sigur (yellow card) 45+3'; Krovinović 90+1'; Livaja (yellow card) 90+8'	Stadium: Stadion Maksimir; Attendance: 16,901; Referee: Mateo Erceg (Benkovac)

9 March 2025 25	Hajduk Split	2–1	Gorica	Split
15:00 CET (UTC+01:00)	Mlakar (yellow card) 7' (goal) 22'; Banić 68' (o.g.)	Report	Šlogar 90+2'; Pajaziti (yellow card) 90+3'; Erceg (yellow card) 90+3'	Stadium: Stadion Poljud; Attendance: 21,548; Referee: Zdenko Lovrić (Đakovo)

16 March 2025 26	Rijeka	3–0	Hajduk Split	Rijeka
17:45 CET (UTC+01:00)	Janković (yellow card) 15' (goal) 35' (pen.); Fruk 25', 89'; Devetak (yellow card) 59'; Bogojević (yellow card) 76'	Report	Livaja (yellow card) 30'; Hrgović (yellow card) 33'; Prpić (yellow card) 33'; Uremović (yellow card) 54'; Sanyang (yellow card) 70'; Diallo (yellow card) 84'	Stadium: Stadion Rujevica; Attendance: 8,095; Referee: Dario Bel (Osijek)

30 March 2025 27	Hajduk Split	1–0	Šibenik	Split
16:00 CEST (UTC+02:00)	Brajković (yellow card) 30'; Rakitić 59'	Report	Cvek (red card) 57'	Stadium: Stadion Poljud; Attendance: 19,929; Referee: Ante Čulina (Zagreb)

5 April 2025 28	Slaven Belupo	0–1	Hajduk Split	Koprivnica
16:00 CEST (UTC+02:00)	Grgić (yellow card) 88'	Report	Livaja 45+1' (pen.) (yellow card) 85'; Sigur (yellow card) 72'	Stadium: Gradski Stadion Ivan Kušek Apaš; Attendance: 3,200; Referee: Igor Pajač (Sv. Ivan Zelina)

13 April 2025 29	Hajduk Split	1–1	Lokomotiva	Split
18:45 CEST (UTC+02:00)	Lučić (red card) 66'; Šego (yellow card) 90+8'; Trajkovski 90+8'	Report	Karačić 45+2' (yellow card) 57'; Smakaj (yellow card) 55'; Fetai (yellow card) 69'	Stadium: Stadion Poljud; Attendance: 24,272; Referee: Dario Bel (Osijek)

18 April 2025 30	Varaždin	1–1	Hajduk Split	Varaždin
18:45 CEST (UTC+02:00)	Duvnjak (yellow card) 40'; Vuk 42'; Škaričić (yellow card) 45+2'; Čuić (yellow card) 56'	Report	Diallo (red card) 17'; Livaja 49' (pen.); Sanyang (yellow card) 75'	Stadium: Stadion Varteks; Attendance: 10,402; Referee: Ante Čulina (Zagreb)

23 April 2025 31	Hajduk Split	0–1	Istra 1961	Split
17:30 CEST (UTC+02:00)	Prpić (yellow card) 25'; Pukštas (yellow card) 54'; Brajković (yellow card) 57'	Report	Rozić 35'	Stadium: Stadion Poljud; Attendance: 23,163; Referee: Mateo Erceg (Benkovac)

27 April 2025 32	Osijek	2–0	Hajduk Split	Osijek
16:00 CEST (UTC+02:00)	Babec 71'; Jakupović 90+4'; Dantas (yellow card) 90+4'	Report	Brajković (yellow card) 24' (yellow-red card) 30'; Sanyang (yellow card) 27'	Stadium: Opus Arena; Attendance: 9,672; Referee: Igor Pajač (Sv. Ivan Zelina)

3 May 2025 33	Hajduk Split	1–3	Dinamo Zagreb	Split
16:00 CEST (UTC+02:00)	Rakitić (yellow card) 18'; Sigur (yellow card) 43'; Livaja 55'; Krovinović (yellow card) 58'	Report	Théophile-Catherine (yellow card) 43'; Pierre-Gabriel 51' (yellow card) 65'; Kulenović 64'; Ristovski (yellow card) 76'; Sučić 90+12'	Stadium: Stadion Poljud; Attendance: 32,111; Referee: Mateo Erceg (Benkovac)

11 May 2025 34	Gorica	1–1	Hajduk Split	Velika Gorica
16:00 CEST (UTC+02:00)	Pajaziti (yellow card) 7' (goal) 48'; Bralić (yellow card) 38'	Report	Prpić (yellow card) 45+2'; Livaja 55'	Stadium: Stadion Radnik; Attendance: 4,540; Referee: Dario Bel (Osijek)

18 May 2025 35	Hajduk Split	2–1	Rijeka	Split
18:45 CEST (UTC+02:00)	Livaja 12' (pen.); Uremović (yellow card) 76'; Trajkovski 78'	Report	Čop 73'; Gojak (yellow card) 87'; Majstorović (yellow card) 90+2'; Fruk (yellow card) 90+3'	Stadium: Stadion Poljud; Attendance: 16,954; Referee: Igor Pajač (Sv. Ivan Zelina)

25 May 2025 36	Šibenik	0–1	Hajduk Split	Šibenik
17:00 CEST (UTC+02:00)		Report	Silić (yellow card) 17'; Kalik (yellow card) 32'; Pukštas 71'; Livaja (red card) 75'	Stadium: Stadion Šubićevac; Attendance: 3,438; Referee: Ante Čulina (Zagreb)

=== Croatian Football Cup ===
17 September 2024 R1	Bilogora 91	0–4	Hajduk Split	Grubišno Polje
16:30 CEST (UTC+02:00)	Araujo Guedes (yellow card) 52'	Report	Benrahou 24'; Šarlija 53'; Antunović 55'; Melnjak 82'	Stadium: NK Bilogora 91; Attendance: 2,500; Referee: Toni Dadić (Zagreb)

30 October 2024 R2	Mladost Ždralovi	0–3	Hajduk Split	Bjelovar
14:00 CET (UTC+01:00)	Marić (yellow card) 60'; Perić (yellow card) 62'	Report	Benrahou 18' (pen.); Pukštas 34'; Uremović (yellow card) 70'; Sanyang 90'	Stadium: Gradski stadion Attendance: 4,500; Referee: Zdenko Lovrić (Đakovo)

26 February 2025 QF	Hajduk Split	1–3	Rijeka	Split
17:00 CET (UTC+01:00)	Livaja 29' (yellow card) 89'; Diallo (yellow card) 45+2'; Lučić (yellow card) 90+5'	Report	Djouahra 6'; Fruk 14' 51'; Majstorović (yellow card) 65'; Menalo (yellow card) 85'	Stadium: Stadion Poljud; Attendance: 19,340; Referee: Patrik Kolarić (Čakovec)

=== UEFA Conference League ===
==== Second qualifying round ====
25 July 2024 First leg	Hajduk Split (Croatia)	2–0	(Faroe Islands) HB Tórshavn	Split, Croatia
21:00 CEST (UTC+02:00)	Uremović 19'; Livaja 30' (pen.)	Report		Stadium: Stadion Poljud; Attendance: 28,488; Referee: Matthew De Gabriele (Malta)

1 August 2024 Second leg	HB Tórshavn (Faroe Islands)	0–0 (0–2 agg.)	(Croatia) Hajduk Split	Tórshavn, Faroe Islands
20:00 WEST (UTC+01:00)	Samuelsen (yellow card) 66'; Mneney (yellow card) 81'	Report	Capan (yellow card) 35'; Kalik (yellow card) 62'	Stadium: Tórsvøllur; Attendance: 1,395; Referee: Tim Marshall (Northern Ireland)

==== Third qualifying round ====
8 August 2024 First leg	Ružomberok (Slovakia)	0–0	(Croatia) Hajduk Split	Ružomberok, Slovakia
18:30 CEST (UTC+02:00)		Report	Uremović (yellow card) 86'	Stadium: Štadión pod Čebraťom; Attendance: 4,712; Referee: César Soto Grado (Spain)

15 August 2024 Second leg	Hajduk Split (Croatia)	0–1 (0–1 agg.)	(Slovakia) Ružomberok	Split, Croatia
21:00 CEST (UTC+02:00)	Sanyang (yellow card) 42'; Diallo (yellow card) 66'; Šarlija (yellow card) 76'; Uremović (red card) 90+9'	Report	Šarlija 7' (o.g.); Lavrinčík (yellow card) 54'; Chrien (yellow card) 70'; Mojžiš (yellow card) 71'; Múdry (yellow card) 79'	Stadium: Stadion Poljud; Attendance: 27,205; Referee: Luca Pairetto (Italy)

== Player seasonal records ==
Updated 10 July 2025

=== Goals ===
Rank	Name	League	Europe	Cup	Total
1	(Croatia) Marko Livaja	19	1	1	21
2	(Croatia) Bruno Durdov	3	–	–	3
2	(Australia) Anthony Kalik	3	–	–	3
2	(Croatia) Filip Krovinović	3	–	–	3
2	(Canada) Niko Sigur	3	–	–	3
2	(North Macedonia) Aleksandar Trajkovski	3	–	–	3
2	(Croatia) Filip Uremović	2	1	–	3
2	(The Gambia) Abdoulie Sanyang	2	–	1	3
2	(Morocco) Yassine Benrahou	1	–	2	3
10	(Croatia) Stipe Biuk	2	–	–	2
10	(Croatia) Ivan Rakitić	2	–	–	2
10	(United States) Rokas Pukštas	1	–	1	2
13	(Ivory Coast) Ismaël Diallo	1	–	–	1
13	(Slovenia) Jan Mlakar	1	–	–	1
13	(Croatia) Mate Antunović	–	–	1	1
13	(Croatia) Dario Melnjak	–	–	1	1
13	(Croatia) Zvonimir Šarlija	–	–	1	1
Own goals		3	–	–	3
TOTALS		49	2	8	59

Source: Competitive matches

=== Clean sheets ===
Rank	Name	League	Europe	Cup	Total
1	(Austria) Ivan Lučić	11	3	1	15
2	(Croatia) Toni Silić	2	–	–	2
3	(Croatia) Borna Buljan	–	–	1	1
3	(Croatia) Lovre Kalinić	–	–	1	1
TOTALS		13	3	3	19

Source: Competitive matches

=== Disciplinary record ===
Number	Position	Player	HNL			Conference League			Croatian Cup			Total		
Number	Position	Player	Yellow card	(yellow card) (yellow-red card)	Red card	Yellow card	(yellow card) (yellow-red card)	Red card	Yellow card	(yellow card) (yellow-red card)	Red card	Yellow card	(yellow card) (yellow-red card)	Red card
3	DF	(Croatia) Dominik Prpić	6	0	0	0	0	0	0	0	0	6	0	0
5	DF	(Ivory Coast) Ismaël Diallo	7	1	1	1	0	0	1	0	0	9	1	1
7	MF	(Australia) Anthony Kalik	6	0	0	1	0	0	0	0	0	7	0	0
8	MF	(Canada) Niko Sigur	6	0	0	0	0	0	0	0	0	6	0	0
10	FW	(Croatia) Marko Livaja	5	0	1	0	0	0	1	0	0	6	0	1
11	MF	(Croatia) Ivan Rakitić	4	0	0	0	0	0	0	0	0	4	0	0
13	GK	(Austria) Ivan Lučić	2	0	1	0	0	0	1	0	0	3	0	1
15	FW	(Croatia) Michele Šego	1	0	0	0	0	0	0	0	0	1	0	0
21	MF	(United States) Rokas Pukštas	5	0	0	0	0	0	0	0	0	5	0	0
23	MF	(Croatia) Filip Krovinović	1	0	0	0	0	0	0	0	0	1	0	0
24	FW	(The Gambia) Abdoulie Sanyang	4	0	0	1	0	0	0	0	0	5	0	0
25	DF	(Croatia) Filip Uremović	10	0	0	1	0	1	1	0	0	12	0	1
26	MF	(Croatia) Marko Capan	0	0	0	1	0	0	0	0	0	1	0	0
27	FW	(Croatia) Stipe Biuk	3	0	0	0	0	0	0	0	0	3	0	0
28	FW	(Croatia) Roko Brajković	2	1	0	0	0	0	0	0	0	2	1	0
29	FW	(Slovenia) Jan Mlakar	1	0	0	0	0	0	0	0	0	1	0	0
31	DF	(Croatia) Zvonimir Šarlija	5	0	0	1	0	0	0	0	0	6	0	0
32	DF	(Croatia) Šimun Hrgović	1	0	0	0	0	0	0	0	0	1	0	0
33	GK	(Croatia) Toni Silić	1	0	0	0	0	0	0	0	0	1	0	0
34	FW	(Croatia) Bruno Durdov	2	0	0	0	0	0	0	0	0	2	0	0
91	GK	(Croatia) Lovre Kalinić	2	0	0	0	0	0	0	0	0	2	0	0
TOTALS			74	2	3	6	0	1	4	0	0	84	2	4

=== Appearances and goals ===
Number	Position	Player	Apps	Goals	Apps	Goals	Apps	Goals	Apps	Goals
Number	Position	Player	Total		HNL (Note: First number represents appearances in starting eleven, while the second number indicates a substitute appearance.)		Conference League		Croatian Cup	
3	DF	(Croatia) Dominik Prpić	33	0	27+3	0	1+1	0	1+0	0
4	FW	(Croatia) Ivan Perišić	4	0	1+0	0	0+3	0	0+0	0
5	DF	(Ivory Coast) Ismaël Diallo	29	1	24+1	1	2+1	0	1+0	0
7	MF	(Australia) Anthony Kalik	36	3	23+8	3	3+1	0	1+0	0
8	MF	(Canada) Niko Sigur	32	3	17+11	3	0+1	0	3+0	0
9	FW	(North Macedonia) Aleksandar Trajkovski	19	3	2+14	3	1+1	0	1+0	0
10	FW	(Croatia) Marko Livaja	40	21	35+0	19	4+0	1	1+0	1
11	MF	(Croatia) Ivan Rakitić	39	2	35+0	2	1+2	0	1+0	0
13	GK	(Austria) Ivan Lučić	34	0	28+0	0	4+0	0	2+0	0
15	FW	(Croatia) Michele Šego	17	0	10+6	0	0+0	0	1+0	0
16	MF	(Bosnia and Herzegovina) Madžid Šošić	1	0	0+0	0	0+0	0	0+1	0
17	DF	(Croatia) Dario Melnjak	38	1	14+18	0	2+1	0	2+1	1
18	DF	(Morocco) Fahd Moufi	10	0	3+2	0	4+0	0	1+0	0
19	DF	(Croatia) Josip Elez	18	0	8+8	0	0+0	0	2+0	0
21	MF	(United States) Rokas Pukštas	37	2	14+16	1	4+0	0	3+0	1
22	FW	(Germany) Leon Dajaku	12	0	3+7	0	0+0	0	2+0	0
23	MF	(Croatia) Filip Krovinović	39	3	27+6	3	3+1	0	0+2	0
24	FW	(The Gambia) Abdoulie Sanyang	27	3	15+7	2	3+1	0	1+0	1
25	DF	(Croatia) Filip Uremović	37	3	31+0	2	4+0	1	1+1	0
26	MF	(Croatia) Marko Capan	5	0	0+1	0	2+0	0	1+1	0
27	FW	(Croatia) Stipe Biuk	20	2	12+5	2	0+0	0	1+2	0
28	FW	(Croatia) Roko Brajković	12	0	5+6	0	0+0	0	0+1	0
29	FW	(Slovenia) Jan Mlakar	6	1	1+5	1	0+0	0	0+0	0
31	DF	(Croatia) Zvonimir Šarlija	12	1	7+0	0	3+0	0	2+0	1
32	DF	(Croatia) Šimun Hrgović	30	0	23+6	0	0+0	0	1+0	0
33	GK	(Croatia) Toni Silić	5	0	4+1	0	0+0	0	0+0	0
34	FW	(Croatia) Bruno Durdov	32	3	10+17	3	0+4	0	0+1	0
35	MF	(Croatia) Luka Jurak	1	0	0+1	0	0+0	0	0+0	0
36	DF	(Croatia) Marino Skelin	3	0	1+1	0	0+0	0	0+1	0
37	MF	(Croatia) Noa Skoko	1	0	0+0	0	0+0	0	0+1	0
39	FW	(Croatia) Mate Antunović	5	1	0+2	0	0+2	0	1+0	1
40	GK	(Croatia) Borna Buljan	1	0	0+0	0	0+0	0	0+1	0
43	DF	(Croatia) Niko Đolonga	1	0	0+0	0	0+0	0	0+1	0
45	MF	(Morocco) Yassine Benrahou	9	3	0+7	1	0+0	0	2+0	2
77	FW	(Ukraine) Nazariy Rusyn	17	0	10+6	0	0+0	0	0+1	0
77	MF	(Kosovo) Emir Sahiti	7	0	2+2	0	3+0	0	0+0	0
91	GK	(Croatia) Lovre Kalinić	5	0	4+0	0	0+0	0	1+0	0

== Transfers ==
=== In ===
Date	Position	Player	From	Fee
30 June 2024	GK	(Ukraine) Davyd Fesyuk	Croatia Zmijavci	Loan ended
30 June 2024	GK	(Croatia) Karlo Sentić	(Kazakhstan) Ordabasy	Loan ended
30 June 2024	GK	(Croatia) Toni Silić	(Moldova) Sheriff Tiraspol	Loan ended
30 June 2024	DF	(Kosovo) Elvis Letaj	(Slovenia) Radomlje	Loan ended
30 June 2024	DF	(Croatia) Luka Vušković	(Poland) Radomiak Radom	Loan ended
30 June 2024	MF	(Croatia) Marko Capan	(Bosnia and Herzegovina) Široki Brijeg	Loan ended
30 June 2024	MF	(Croatia) Ivan Krolo	(Slovenia) Radomlje	Loan ended
30 June 2024	MF	(Croatia) Tino Blaž Lauš	(Slovenia) Koper	Loan ended
30 June 2024	MF	(Bosnia and Herzegovina) Madžid Šošić	(Slovenia) Radomlje	Loan ended
1 July 2024	FW	(Croatia) Ivan Perišić	(England) Tottenham Hotspur	Free
18 July 2024	FW	(The Gambia) Abdoulie Sanyang	(France) Grenoble	700,000 €
21 July 2024	MF	(Croatia) Ivan Rakitić	(Saudi Arabia) Al-Shabab	Free
1 September 2024	FW	(Croatia) Stipe Biuk	(Spain) Real Valladolid	Loan
11 January 2025	FW	(Croatia) Jere Vrcić	Croatia Zmijavci	Loan ended
13 January 2025	FW	(Croatia) Michele Šego	(Croatia) Varaždin	600,000 €
25 January 2025	FW	(Ukraine) Nazariy Rusyn	(England) Sunderland	Loan
28 January 2025	FW	(Slovenia) Jan Mlakar	(Italy) Pisa	Loan (fee: 150,000 €)
7 February 2025	GK	(Croatia) Toni Silić	(Croatia) Lokomotiva Zagreb	Recalled from loan

Total Spending: ▼1,450,000 €

=== Out ===
Date	Position	Player	To	Fee
27 May 2024	FW	(Croatia) Nikola Kalinić		Retired
3 June 2024	DF	(Croatia) Dino Mikanović	(Croatia) Gorica	End of contract
3 June 2024	MF	(Belgium) Vadis Odjidja-Ofoe		Retired
3 June 2024	FW	(Bosnia and Herzegovina) Filip Čuić	(Croatia) Lokomotiva Zagreb	End of contract
30 June 2024	MF	(Hungary) László Kleinheisler	(Greece) Panathinaikos	Loan ended
30 June 2024	FW	(Croatia) Ivan Perišić	(England) Tottenham Hotspur	Loan ended
30 June 2024	FW	(Croatia) Josip Brekalo	(Italy) Fiorentina	Loan ended
6 July 2024	MF	(Croatia) Tino Blaž Lauš	(Bosnia and Herzegovina) Velež Mostar	Free
8 July 2024	DF	(Portugal) Ferro	(Portugal) Estrela da Amadora	Free (released)
9 July 2024	DF	(Croatia) Luka Vušković	(Belgium) Westerlo	Loan
13 July 2024	MF	(Croatia) Ivan Ćubelić	(Croatia) Slaven Belupo	Free
15 July 2024	GK	(Croatia) Karlo Sentić	(Hungary) Diósgyőri VTK	Free
19 July 2024	DF	(Croatia) Mateo Jurić-Petrašilo	(Bulgaria) Spartak Varna	Free
19 July 2024	MF	(Croatia) Ivan Krolo	(Croatia) Lokomotiva Zagreb	Free
19 July 2024	FW	(Croatia) Boško Jemo	(Croatia) Dugopolje	Free
7 August 2024	GK	(Croatia) Toni Silić	(Croatia) Lokomotiva Zagreb	Loan
30 August 2024	FW	(Kosovo) Emir Sahiti	(Germany) Hamburger SV	1,200,000 €
30 August 2024	FW	(Croatia) Ivan Perišić	(Netherlands) PSV	Free (released)
5 September 2024	MF	(Croatia) Ante Kavelj	(Croatia) Šibenik	Free
5 September 2024	FW	(Croatia) Jere Vrcić	Croatia Zmijavci	Loan
9 January 2025	MF	(Bosnia and Herzegovina) Madžid Šošić	(Bosnia and Herzegovina) Željezničar Sarajevo	Free
12 January 2025	DF	(Morocco) Fahd Moufi	(Morocco) Wydad Casablanca	Free (released)
12 January 2025	FW	(Germany) Leon Dajaku	(United Arab Emirates) Sharjah	Free (released)
21 January 2025	FW	(Croatia) Mate Antunović	(Croatia) Varaždin	Free
27 January 2025	MF	(Morocco) Yassine Benrahou	(France) Caen	Loan
31 January 2025	DF	(Croatia) Zvonimir Šarlija	(Cyprus) Pafos	Loan
31 January 2025	FW	(Croatia) Jere Vrcić	Croatia Zmijavci	Free
15 February 2025	MF	(Croatia) Luka Jurak	(Slovenia) Mura	Loan
17 February 2025	GK	(Croatia) Borna Buljan	(Slovenia) Bravo	Free

Total Income: ▲1,200,000 €

Total expenditure: ▼250,000 €

=== Promoted from youth squad ===
Position	Player	Age
FW	(Croatia) Bruno Durdov	16
DF	(Croatia) Niko Đolonga	20
DF	(Croatia) Marino Skelin	18
