= 2023 Croatian Football Super Cup =

Dinamo Zagreb	Hajduk Split
1	0
- Date: 15 July 2023
- Venue: Stadion Maksimir, Zagreb
- Man of the Match: Martin Baturina (Dinamo Zagreb)
- Referee: Dario Bel (Osijek)
- Attendance: 17,707

The 2023 Croatian Football Super Cup was the fourteenth edition of the Croatian Football Super Cup, a football match contested by the winners of the Croatian First League and Croatian Football Cup. The match was played on 15 July 2023 at Stadion Maksimir in Zagreb between the 2022–23 Croatian Football League winners Dinamo Zagreb and the 2022–23 Croatian Football Cup winners Hajduk Split. This was the second season in a row where these two teams met in Croatian Super Cup. Dinamo Zagreb were attempting to defend their title, as they won last year's edition 4–1 on penalties.

== Match details ==
15 July 2023
20:00 UTC+2

Dinamo Zagreb	1–0	Hajduk Split
Baturina 52'	Report

Stadion Maksimir, Zagreb
Attendance: 17,707
Referee: Dario Bel (Osijek)

Dinamo Zagreb	Hajduk Split

GK	40	(Croatia) Dominik Livaković (c)	(yellow card) 81'
RB	2	(North Macedonia) Stefan Ristovski		(substituted off) 84'
CB	37	(Croatia) Josip Šutalo
CB	55	(Croatia) Dino Perić
LB	14	(Austria) Robert Ljubičić
DM	27	(Croatia) Josip Mišić		(substituted off) 84'
DM	31	(Croatia) Marko Bulat
AM	7	(Croatia) Luka Ivanušec		(substituted off) 89'
AM	10	(Croatia) Martin Baturina	52'
AM	77	(Croatia) Dario Špikić		(substituted off) 84'
CF	9	(Croatia) Bruno Petković		(substituted off) 67'
Substitutes:
GK	33	(Croatia) Ivan Nevistić
DF	2	(Iran) Sadegh Moharrami		(substituted on) 84'
DF	6	(France) Maxime Bernauer
DF	39	(Croatia) Mauro Perković
DF	4	(Croatia) Boško Šutalo
MF	12	(Croatia) Petar Bočkaj
MF	70	(Bosnia and Herzegovina) Luka Menalo		(substituted on) 84'
MF	20	(Croatia) Antonio Marin		(substituted on) 89'
MF	25	(Bosnia and Herzegovina) Petar Sučić		(substituted on) 84'
FW	18	(Switzerland) Josip Drmić
FW	11	(Azerbaijan) Mahir Emreli
FW	17	(Croatia) Fran Topić		(substituted on) 67'
Manager:
(Croatia) Igor Bišćan

GK	13	(Austria) Ivan Lučić
RB	20	(Croatia) Niko Sigur	(yellow card) 54'	(substituted off) 69'
CB	4	(Portugal) Ferro
CB	31	(Croatia) Zvonimir Šarlija
LB	17	(Croatia) Dario Melnjak
DM	21	(United States) Rokas Pukštas		(substituted off) 69'
DM	23	(Croatia) Filip Krovinović (c)
AM	41	(Croatia) Ivan Dolček		(substituted off) 63'
AM	11	(Morocco) Yassine Benrahou
AM	22	(Germany) Leon Dajaku		(substituted off) 63'
CF	29	(Slovenia) Jan Mlakar
Substitutes:
GK	1	(Croatia) Toni Silić
DF	5	(Ivory Coast) Ismaël Diallo
DF	18	(Morocco) Fahd Moufi		(substituted on) 69'
DF	44	(Croatia) Luka Vušković
MF	77	(Kosovo) Emir Sahiti	(yellow card) 81'	(substituted on) 63'
MF	7	(Australia) Anthony Kalik
MF	8	(Belgium) Vadis Odjidja-Ofoe		(substituted on) 69'
MF	28	(Croatia) Roko Brajković
MF	34	(Croatia) Marko Capan
MF	36	(Croatia) Tino Blaž Lauš
MF	88	(Croatia) Ivan Ćubelić
FW	39	(Bosnia and Herzegovina) Filip Čuić		(substituted on) 63'
Manager:
(Croatia) Ivan Leko

Assistant referees:
Goran Pataki (Đakovo)
Marjan Tomas (Osijek)
Fourth official:
Patrik Kolarić (Čakovec)
Video assistant referee:
Mario Zebec (Cestica)
Assistant video assistant referee:
Bojan Zobenica (Velika Gorica)

Match rules

- 90 minutes.
- Penalty shoot-out if scores level.
- Twelve named substitutes.
- Maximum of five substitutions.
