= Leon Dajaku =

German footballer

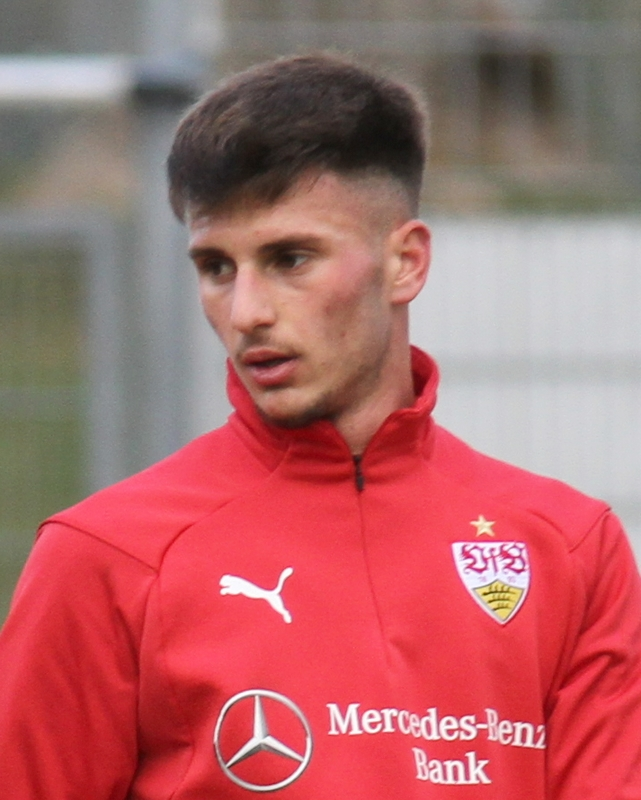
- Dajaku with VfB Stuttgart in December 2018

Personal information
- Full name: Leon Dajaku
- Date of birth: 12 April 2001 (age 25)
- Place of birth: Waiblingen, Germany
- Height: 1.82 m (6 ft 0 in)
- Positions: Winger; forward

Team information
- Current team: Hansa Rostock
- Number: 43

Youth career
- Spvgg Rommelshausen
- –2014: FSV Waiblingen
- 2014–2019: VfB Stuttgart
- 2019–2020: Bayern Munich

Senior career*
Years	Team	Apps	(Gls)
2018–2019	VfB Stuttgart	2	(0)
2019	VfB Stuttgart II	1	(0)
2019–2021	Bayern Munich II	43	(7)
2019–2021	Bayern Munich	2	(0)
2021	→ Union Berlin (loan)	2	(0)
2021–2022	Union Berlin	0	(0)
2021–2022	→ Sunderland (loan)	22	(4)
2022–2023	Sunderland	10	(0)
2023	→ St. Gallen (loan)	12	(0)
2023–2025	Hajduk Split	33	(4)
2025	Sharjah	1	(0)
2025–2026	SSV Ulm	30	(5)
2026–	Hansa Rostock	0	(0)

International career^{‡}
2017–2018	Germany U17	14	(3)
2018–2019	Germany U18	3	(1)
2019	Germany U19	6	(3)
2021	Germany U20	1	(0)
- * Club domestic league appearances and goals as of 30 May 2026 ‡ National team caps and goals as of 7 October 2021

Leon Dajaku (born 12 April 2001) is a German professional footballer who plays as a winger and forward for 3. Liga club Hansa Rostock.

== Club career ==
=== Early career / VfB Stuttgart ===
Dajaku began his youth career with Spvgg Rommelshausen and FSV Waiblingen, before moving to the youth team of VfB Stuttgart in 2014.

On 23 November 2018, he was named as a VfB Stuttgart substitute for the first time in a Bundesliga match against Bayer Leverkusen. His debut with VfB Stuttgart came sixteen days later against Borussia Mönchengladbach after coming on as a substitute at 75th minute in place of Anastasios Donis.

=== Bayern Munich ===
On 16 July 2019, Dajaku signed a four-year contract with Bundesliga club Bayern Munich and he was subsequently assigned to the reserve team in the 3. Liga, where he received squad number 7. His debut with Bayern Munich II came four days later against Würzburger Kickers after coming on as a substitute at 72nd minute in place of Meritan Shabani.

On 2 November 2019, Dajaku was named as a Bayern Munich substitute for the first time in a league match against Eintracht Frankfurt. His debut with Bayern Munich came on 21 December against VfL Wolfsburg after coming on as a substitute at last minutes in place of Serge Gnabry.

=== Union Berlin ===
On 16 January 2021, Dajaku signed a six-month loan deal with Bundesliga club Union Berlin with the option to purchase. His debut with Union Berlin came four days later against RB Leipzig after coming on as a substitute at 60th minute in place of Cedric Teuchert.

On 31 August 2021, Union Berlin activated the purchase clause in the loan agreement for Dajaku. The fee was rumored to be €1 million.

=== Sunderland ===
On 31 August 2021, Dajaku signed a season-long loan deal with EFL League One club Sunderland and received squad number 7. Eighteen days later, he was named as a Sunderland substitute for the first time in a league match against Fleetwood Town. His debut with Sunderland came on 25 September in the 2021–22 EFL Cup third round against Wigan Athletic after being named in the starting line-up.

Following the loan, Dajaku moved to Sunderland on a permanent basis in June 2022 and signed a two-year contract.

==== Loan at St. Gallen ====
On 26 January 2023, Dajaku was loaned to Swiss Super League side St. Gallen until the end of the season and received squad number 77. His debut with St. Gallen came three days later against Zürich after coming on as a substitute at 76th minute in place of Chadrac Akolo.

=== Hajduk Split ===
On 26 June 2023, Dajaku signed a four-year contract with Croatian First League club Hajduk Split and received squad number 22. His debut with Hajduk Split came on 15 July in the 2023 Croatian Super Cup against Dinamo Zagreb after being named in the starting line-up. About a month after debut, Dajaku scored his first goal for Hajduk Split in his fourth appearance for the club in a 3–0 home win over Slaven Belupo in Croatian First League.

=== Sharjah ===
In March 2025, Dajaku becomes part of UAE Pro League side Sharjah, with which he made his debut in the 2024–25 UAE League Cup semi-final against Shabab Al Ahli after coming on as a substitute at 86th minute in place of Majid Rashid.

=== SSV Ulm ===
On 9 September 2025, Dajaku signed a two-season contract with SSV Ulm in 3. Liga.

== International career ==
Dajaku was eligible to represent three countries on international level, either Albania, Kosovo or Germany, where with the latter from 2017 to 2021 he has represented at youth international level, respectively has been part of the U17, U18, U19 and U20 teams and he with these teams played 24 matches and scored seven goals.

== Personal life ==
Born and raised in Germany, Dajaku is of Kosovo-Albanian origin from Skenderaj.

His mother, Blerta Dajaku, is a Kosovo-Albanian beautician and model. In September 2024, when she posed alongside him in a social media photograph, football fans and viewers initially misidentified her as his romantic partner due to her youthful appearance. The confusion sparked widespread commentary online.

Dajaku together with his girlfriend Leonie June, who is also known as Leonie Rose, are the parents of a daughter named Nava.

== Career statistics ==
=== Club ===
As of match played 18 March 2023

Appearances and goals by club, season and competition
Club	Season	League			Cup (Note: Includes DFB Pokal, FA Cup, EFL Cup)		Continental		Other		Total	
Club	Season	Division	Apps	Goals	Apps	Goals	Apps	Goals	Apps	Goals	Apps	Goals
VfB Stuttgart	2018–19	Bundesliga	2	0	0	0	—		1 (Note: Appearance with VfB Stuttgart II)	0	3	0
Bayern Munich II	2019–20	3. Liga	29	4	—		—		—		29	4
Bayern Munich II	2020–21	3. Liga	14	3	—		—		—		14	3
Bayern Munich II	Total		45	7	0	0	—		1	0	46	7
Bayern Munich	2019–20	Bundesliga	2	0	0	0	—		—		2	0
Bayern Munich	2020–21	Bundesliga	0	0	1	0	—		—		1	0
Bayern Munich	Total		2	0	1	0	—		—		3	0
Union Berlin	2020–21	Bundesliga	2	0	0	0	—		—		2	0
Sunderland (loan)	2021–22	League One	22	4	3	0	—		2 (Note: Appearances in EFL Trophy)	0	27	4
Sunderland	2022–23	Championship	10	0	0	0	—		—		10	0
Sunderland	Total		34	4	3	0	—		2	0	39	4
St. Gallen (loan)	2022–23	Swiss Super League	12	0	1	0	—		—		13	0
Hajduk Split	2023–24	Croatian First League	23	4	1	0	1	0	1 (Note: Appearance in Croatian Super Cup)	0	26	4
Hajduk Split	2024–25	Croatian League	10	0	2	0	—		—		12	0
Hajduk Split	Total		45	4	4	0	1	0	1	0	51	4
Sharjah	2024–25	UAE Pro League	0	0	0	0	—		1 (Note: Appearances in UAE League Cup)	0	1	0
Career total			126	15	8	0	1	0	5	0	140	15

== Honours ==
Bayern Munich

- Bundesliga: 2019–20
- DFB-Pokal: 2019–20

Sunderland

- EFL League One play-offs: 2022

Sharjah

- AFC Champions League Two: 2024–25
