= Filip Uremović =

Croatian footballer

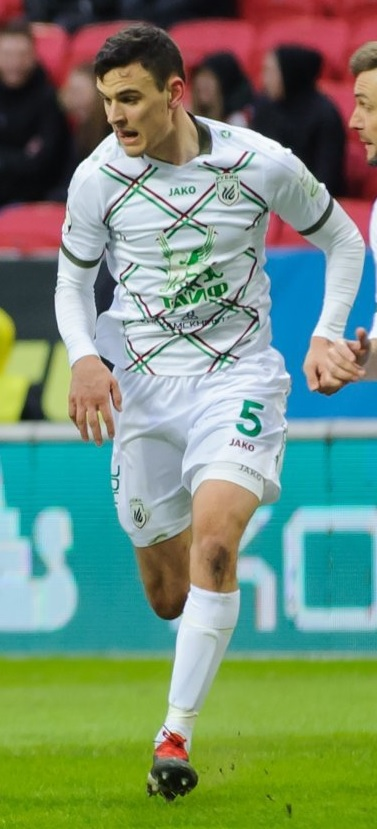
- Uremović with Rubin Kazan in 2019

Personal information
- Date of birth: 11 February 1997 (age 29)
- Place of birth: Požega, Croatia
- Height: 1.84 m (6 ft 0 in)
- Position: Defender

Team information
- Current team: Kawasaki Frontale
- Number: 22

Youth career
- NK Požega
- 2013–2015: Cibalia

Senior career*
Years	Team	Apps	(Gls)
2015–2016	Cibalia	12	(0)
2016–2018	Dinamo Zagreb II	45	(2)
2018	Olimpija Ljubljana	18	(1)
2018–2022	Rubin Kazan	90	(1)
2022	→ Sheffield United (loan)	3	(0)
2022–2023	Hertha BSC	22	(0)
2023–2025	Hajduk Split	55	(3)
2025–	Kawasaki Frontale	12	(0)

International career^{‡}
2016–2018	Croatia U19	5	(1)
2018–2019	Croatia U21	9	(2)
2020	Croatia	6	(0)
- * Club domestic league appearances and goals as of 1 August 2026 ‡ National team caps and goals as of 30 October 2023

Filip Uremović (born 11 February 1997) is a Croatian professional footballer who plays as a centre-back for J. League club Kawasaki Frontale and the Croatia national team.

== Club career ==
Uremović made his Croatian First Football League debut for Cibalia on 17 July 2016 in a game against Hajduk Split.

On 4 June 2018, Uremović signed a four-year contract with the Russian Premier League side Rubin Kazan. On 13 March 2022, Uremović's contract with Rubin was suspended until 30 June 2022, according to the new FIFA regulations related to the Russian invasion of Ukraine. Those regulations allow foreign players in Russia to suspend their contract and sign with a club outside of Russia temporarily until 30 June 2022.

On 24 March 2022, Uremović signed with Sheffield United until the end of the season.

Rubin Kazan was relegated from the Russian Premier League at the end of the 2021–22 season, and Uremović activated a clause in his contract that allowed him to become a free agent in case of relegation. He then signed a four-year contract with German club Hertha BSC.

On 31 August 2023, a day after terminating his contract with Hertha, Uremović returned to Croatia and joined Hajduk Split on a free transfer.

== International career ==
Uremović made his Croatia national team debut on 8 September 2020 in a UEFA Nations League game against France. He started the game and played the first 57 minutes of a 4–2 away loss. On 17 May 2021, Uremović was named in the preliminary 34-man squad for the UEFA Euro 2020, but did not make the final 26.

== Career statistics ==
=== Club ===
As of match played 1 August 2026

Club	Season	League			National cup (Note: Includes Croatian Football Cup, Slovenian Cup, Russian Cup, DFB-Pokal)		Europe		Total	
Club	Season	Division	Apps	Goals	Apps	Goals	Apps	Goals	Apps	Goals
Cibalia	2013–14	2. HNL	0	0	0	0	—		0	0
Cibalia	2014–15	2. HNL	6	0	1	0	—		7	0
Cibalia	2015–16	2. HNL	3	0	0	0	—		3	0
Cibalia	2016–17	1. HNL	3	0	—		—		3	0
Cibalia	Total		12	0	1	0	—		13	0
Dinamo Zagreb	2016–17	1. HNL	0	0	0	0	0	0	0	0
Dinamo Zagreb	2017–18	1. HNL	0	0	1	0	0	0	1	0
Dinamo Zagreb	Total		0	0	1	0	0	0	1	0
Dinamo Zagreb II	2016–17	2. HNL	27	1	—		—		27	1
Dinamo Zagreb II	2017–18	2. HNL	18	1	—		—		18	1
Dinamo Zagreb II	Total		45	2	—		—		45	2
Olimpija Ljubljana	2017–18	Slovenian PrvaLiga	18	1	2	0	—		20	1
Olimpija Ljubljana	Total		18	1	2	0	0	0	20	1
Rubin Kazan	2018–19	Russian Premier League	23	1	4	0	—		27	1
Rubin Kazan	2019–20	Russian Premier League	25	0	0	0	—		25	0
Rubin Kazan	2020–21	Russian Premier League	24	0	0	0	—		24	0
Rubin Kazan	2021–22	Russian Premier League	18	0	1	0	2 (Note: Appearances in UEFA Conference League)	0	21	0
Rubin Kazan	Total		90	1	5	0	2	0	97	1
Sheffield United (loan)	2021–22	Championship	3	0	—		—		3	0
Sheffield United (loan)	Total		3	0	0	0	0		3	0
Hertha BSC	2022–23	Bundesliga	22	0	0	0	—		22	0
Hertha BSC	2023–24	2. Bundesliga	—		1	1	—		1	1
Hertha BSC	Total		22	0	1	1	—		23	1
Hajduk Split	2023–24	Croatian Football League	24	1	3	0	—		27	1
Hajduk Split	2024–25	Croatian Football League	31	2	2	0	0	0	33	2
Hajduk Split	2025–26	Croatian Football League	0	0	0	0	4	1	4	1
Hajduk Split	Total		55	3	5	0	4	1	64	4
Kawasaki Frontale	2025	J League	11	0	4	0	0	0	15	0
Kawasaki Frontale	2026	J League	1	0	0	0	0	0	1	0
Kawasaki Frontale	Total		12	0	4	0	0	0	16	0
Career total			257	7	19	1	6	1	282	9

=== International ===
As of match played 14 November 2020

Appearances and goals by national team and year
National team	Year	Apps	Goals
Croatia	2020	6	0
Total		6	0

== Honours ==
Olimpija Ljubljana

- Slovenian PrvaLiga: 2017–18
- Slovenian Football Cup: 2017–18
