= Zvonimir Šarlija =

Croatian footballer

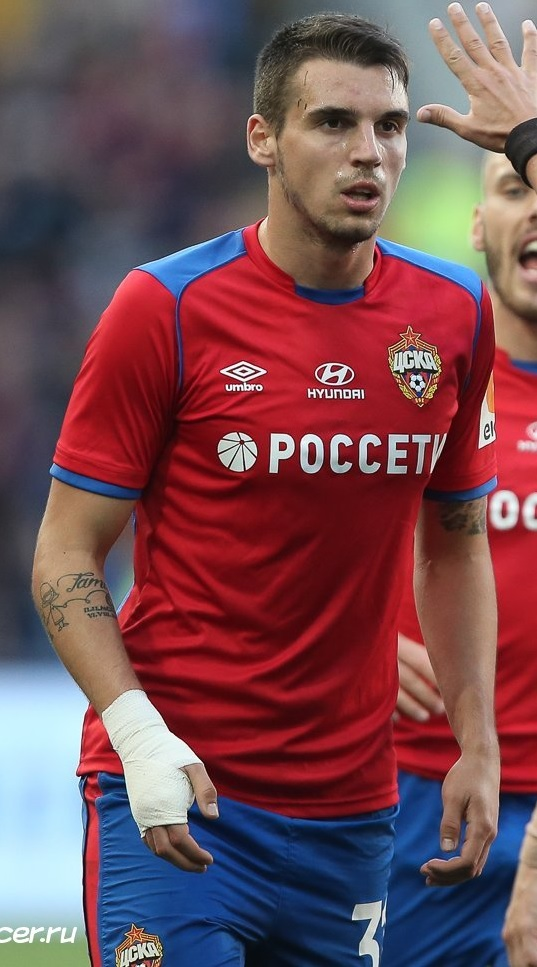
- Šarlija with CSKA Moscow in 2019

Personal information
- Full name: Zvonimir Šarlija
- Date of birth: 29 August 1996 (age 30)
- Place of birth: Koprivnica, Croatia
- Height: 1.89 m (6 ft 2 in)
- Position: Centre back

Youth career
- 2005: Slaven Belupo
- 2005–2006: Koprivnica
- 2006–2007: Slaven Belupo
- 2007–2008: Koprivnica
- 2008–2009: Slaven Belupo
- 2009–2010: Koprivnica
- 2010–2015: Slaven Belupo

Senior career*
Years	Team	Apps	(Gls)
2014–2015	Slaven Belupo B	22	(2)
2015–2020	Slaven Belupo	44	(0)
2015-2016	→ Koprivnica (loan)	20	(1)
2016–2017	→ Solin (loan)	29	(1)
2019–2020	→ CSKA Moscow (loan)	11	(0)
2020	→ Kasımpaşa (loan)	6	(1)
2020–2021	Ankaragücü	32	(1)
2021–2023	Panathinaikos	41	(0)
2023–2026	Hajduk Split	62	(3)
2025	→ Pafos (loan)	14	(0)
- * Club domestic league appearances and goals as of 04:04, 26 October 2025 (UTC)

Zvonimir Šarlija (born 29 August 1996) is a Croatian professional footballer who plays as a defender.

== Career ==
Born in Koprivnica, Zvonimir Šarlija started practicing football at the local club NK Slaven Belupo, where his father used to play and captain the senior team. As per club practice, he was moved between Slaven and its feeder side NK Koprivnica. At the age of 18, he captained the club's fourth-tier reserve side, where he scored 2 goals in 22 matches, along with the U-19 side. Subsequently, he was loaned out by his club, first in 2015 to its third-tier feeder NK Koprivnica, scoring one goal in twenty appearances, then to second-tier NK Solin.

Back at Slaven Belupo in 2017, Šarlija gathered 49 caps for the senior side in all competitions.

On 29 June 2019, Slaven Belupo announced that Šarlija had moved to CSKA Moscow, with CSKA confirming the season-long loan deal, with the first option to buy, on 1 July. On 18 January 2020, CSKA Moscow confirmed that their loan deal with Šarlija had ended, and that he'd joined Kasımpaşa on loan for the remainder of the 2019/20 season with Kasımpaşa confining they had an option to make the move permanent at the end of the season.

On 31 August 2020, it was announced that Šarlija signed for Turkish club Ankaragücü. The reported fee was €350.000 .

On 30 July 2021, he signed a two-year contract with Panathinaikos.

In the summer of 2023, Šarlija officially joined Hajduk Split on a four-year contract.

== Personal life ==
Šarlija's father Milan, originally from Jasenice near Zadar in Dalmatia captained Slaven Belupo, and later became the club's director for a while. His younger brother Lovro and cousin Ante are also former Slaven Belupo players, while his brother Luka is the club's spokesman. Šarlija is a lifelong Hajduk Split fan, having a tattoo of Ivica Hlevnjak-Bukle's legendary statement "Emocije su zajebane.".

== Career statistics ==
As of 13 March 2026

Club	Season	League			National cup (Note: Includes Croatian Cup, Russian Cup, Turkish Cup, Greek Cup)		Europe		Other		Total	
Club	Season	Division	Apps	Goals	Apps	Goals	Apps	Goals	Apps	Goals	Apps	Goals
Solin (loan)	2016–17	2. HNL	29	1	2	0	—		—		31	1
Slaven Belupo	2017–18	Prva HNL	13	0	0	0	—		—		13	0
Slaven Belupo	2018–19	Prva HNL	31	0	2	0	—		—		33	0
Slaven Belupo	Total		44	0	2	0	—		—		46	0
CSKA Moscow (loan)	2019–20	Russian Premier League	11	0	2	0	1 (Note: Appearance in UEFA Europa League)	0	—		14	0
Kasımpaşa (loan)	2019–20	Süper Lig	6	1	1	0	—		—		7	1
Ankaragücü	2020–21	Süper Lig	32	1	1	0	—		—		33	1
Panathinaikos	2021–22	Super League Greece	14	0	5	0	—		6 (Note: Appearances in Super League Greece Playoffs)	0	25	0
Panathinaikos	2022–23	Super League Greece	14	0	2	0	1 (Note: Appearance(s) in UEFA Europa Conference League)	0	7	0	24	0
Panathinaikos	Total		28	0	7	0	1	0	13	0	49	0
Hajduk Split	2023–24	HNL	28	2	4	0	2	0	1 (Note: Appearance in Croatian Super Cup)	0	35	2
Hajduk Split	2024–25	HNL	7	0	2	1	3	0	—		12	1
Hajduk Split	2025–26	HNL	20	1	2	0	4	0	—		26	1
Hajduk Split	Total		55	3	8	1	9	0	1	0	73	4
Pafos (loan)	2024–25	Cypriot First Division	6	0	3	0	4	0	8 (Note: Appearances in Cyprus League Championship Round)	0	21	0
Career total			211	6	26	1	15	0	22	0	274	7

== Honours ==
Panathinaikos

- Greek Cup: 2021–22

Pafos

- Cypriot First Division: 2024–25
