= Karlo Lusavec =

Croatian footballer (born 2003)

Personal information
- Date of birth: 30 October 2003 (age 23)
- Place of birth: Varaždin, Croatia
- Height: 1.75 m (5 ft 9 in)
- Position: Midfielder

Team information
- Current team: Horsens
- Number: 20

Youth career
- –2017: NK Novi Marof
- 2017–2021: NK Varaždin

Senior career*
Years	Team	Apps	(Gls)
2020–2024	Varaždin	55	(0)
2023	→ Dugopolje (loan)	14	(0)
2024–	Horsens	44	(0)
- * Club domestic league appearances and goals as of 13:23, 27 July 2026 (UTC)

Karlo Lusavec (born 30 October 2003) is a Croatian professional footballer who plays as a midfielder for Danish Superliga club AC Horsens.

== Career ==
On 26 August 2024 it was confirmed that Lusavec moved to Danish 1st Division side AC Horsens on a deal until June 2028.

== Career statistics ==
=== Club ===
As of 7 May 2021.

Club	Season	League			Cup		Continental		Other		Total	
Club	Season	Division	Apps	Goals	Apps	Goals	Apps	Goals	Apps	Goals	Apps	Goals
NK Varaždin	2020–21	1. HNL	2	0	1 (Note: Appearances in the Croatian Cup)	0	0	0	0	0	3	0
Career total			2	0	1	0	0	0	0	0	3	0
