= Andrej Lazarov =

North Macedonian footballer (1999–2025)

Personal information
- Date of birth: 8 September 1999
- Place of birth: Kočani, North Macedonia
- Date of death: 16 March 2025 (aged 25)
- Place of death: Kočani, North Macedonia
- Height: 1.82 m (6 ft 0 in)
- Position: Midfielder

Youth career
- 2014–2015: Metalurg Skopje
- 2015–2018: Rabotnichki

Senior career*
Years	Team	Apps	(Gls)
2018–2022	Rabotnichki	26	(0)
2019–2020	→ Tikvesh (loan)	28	(1)
2022–2023	Tikvesh	43	(4)
2023–2024	Rudeš	13	(1)
2024	Gorica	14	(0)
2024–2025	Shkupi	8	(0)
- * Club domestic league appearances and goals

Andrej Lazarov (Macedonian: Андреј Лазаров; 8 September 1999 – 16 March 2025) was a Macedonian footballer who played as a midfielder.

== Career ==
=== HNK Gorica (2024) ===
On 26 January 2024, HNK Gorica announced the signing of 24-year-old North Macedonian midfielder Andrej Lazarov. He joined the club as a free agent after spending the first part of the season with NK Rudeš, where he made 13 appearances and scored one goal.

== Death ==
Lazarov died on 16 March 2025 after being hospitalised due to smoke inhalation; he had tried to rescue people from the Kočani nightclub fire, suffering burns in the process. He was 25.
