= Rokas Pukštas =

American soccer player (born 2004)

Personal information
- Full name: Rokas Pukštas
- Date of birth: August 25, 2004 (age 22)
- Place of birth: Stillwater, Oklahoma, US
- Height: 5 ft 11 in (1.81 m)
- Position: Midfielder

Team information
- Current team: Middlesbrough
- Number: 21

Youth career
- 2018–2020: Sporting Kansas City
- 2020: Barça Residency Academy
- 2020–2022: Hajduk Split

Senior career*
Years	Team	Apps	(Gls)
2022–2026	Hajduk Split	114	(23)
2022	→ Solin (loan)	5	(3)
2026–	Middlesbrough	1	(0)

International career^{‡}
2019	United States U15	5	(0)
2021–2023	United States U20	14	(2)
2025–	United States U23	1	(0)
- * Club domestic league appearances and goals as of 7 September 2026 ‡ National team caps and goals as of November 18, 2025

Rokas Pukštas (born August 25, 2004) is an American professional soccer player who plays as a midfielder for EFL Championship club Middlesbrough.

== Club career ==
Pukštas joined Sporting Kansas City's youth academy in 2018, and had a trial with Manchester United in 2019. He moved to the Barça Residency Academy in January 2020, where he was a regular starter of their youth sides.

Pukštas signed a professional contract with Hajduk Split on November 10, 2020, joining their under-17 side. He made his professional debut with Hajduk Split in a 2–1 Croatian First Football League win over Hrvatski Dragovoljac on April 29, 2022.

On August 31, 2026, Pukštas was signed to a five-year contract by Middlesbrough. On September 5, he made his debut for the club in a 1–0 league victory against Queens Park Rangers.

== International career ==
Pukštas was born in the United States to Lithuanian parents, and is eligible to play for either nation. He represented the United States under-15 team in 2019. He later represented the United States under-20 side in 2021 and at the 2023 FIFA U-20 World Cup, where he scored a goal against New Zealand.

He was approached to represent the senior Lithuania national team in March 2022.

== Personal life ==
Pukštas was born in Stillwater, Oklahoma, to a family of Lithuanian athletes. His father, Mindaugas Pukštas, was a Lithuanian marathon runner who came 74th in his discipline at the 2004 Summer Olympics.

== Career statistics ==
=== Club ===
As of match played September 8, 2026

Appearances and goals by club, season and competition
Club	Season	League			National cup (Note: Includes Croatian Football Cup)		League cup (Note: Includes EFL Cup)		Continental		Other		Total	
Club	Season	Division	Apps	Goals	Apps	Goals	Apps	Goals	Apps	Goals	Apps	Goals	Apps	Goals
Hajduk Split	2021–22	1. HNL	1	0	—		—		—		—		1	0
Hajduk Split	2022–23	1. HNL	21	4	5	0	—		—		1 (Note: Appearance in Croatian Super Cup)	0	27	4
Hajduk Split	2023–24	1. HNL	28	8	2	0	—		—		—		30	8
Hajduk Split	2024–25	1. HNL	30	1	3	1	—		4 (Note: Appearances in UEFA Conference League)	0	—		37	2
Hajduk Split	2025–26	1. HNL	31	9	3	1	—		2	0	—		36	10
Hajduk Split	2026–27	1. HNL	2	2	—		—		5 (Note: Four appearances in UEFA Europa League, one appearance and one goal in UEFA Conference League)	1	—		7	3
Hajduk Split	Total		113	24	13	2	—		11	1	1	0	138	27
Solin (loan)	2022–23	1. NL	5	3	—		—		—		—		5	3
Middlesbrough	2026–27	Championship	1	0	0	0	1	0	—		—		2	0
Career total			119	27	13	2	1	0	11	1	1	0	145	30

== Honors ==
Hajduk Split

- Croatian Cup: 2022–23

United States U20

- CONCACAF U-20 Championship: 2022
