= Niko Sigur =

Canadian soccer player (born 2003)

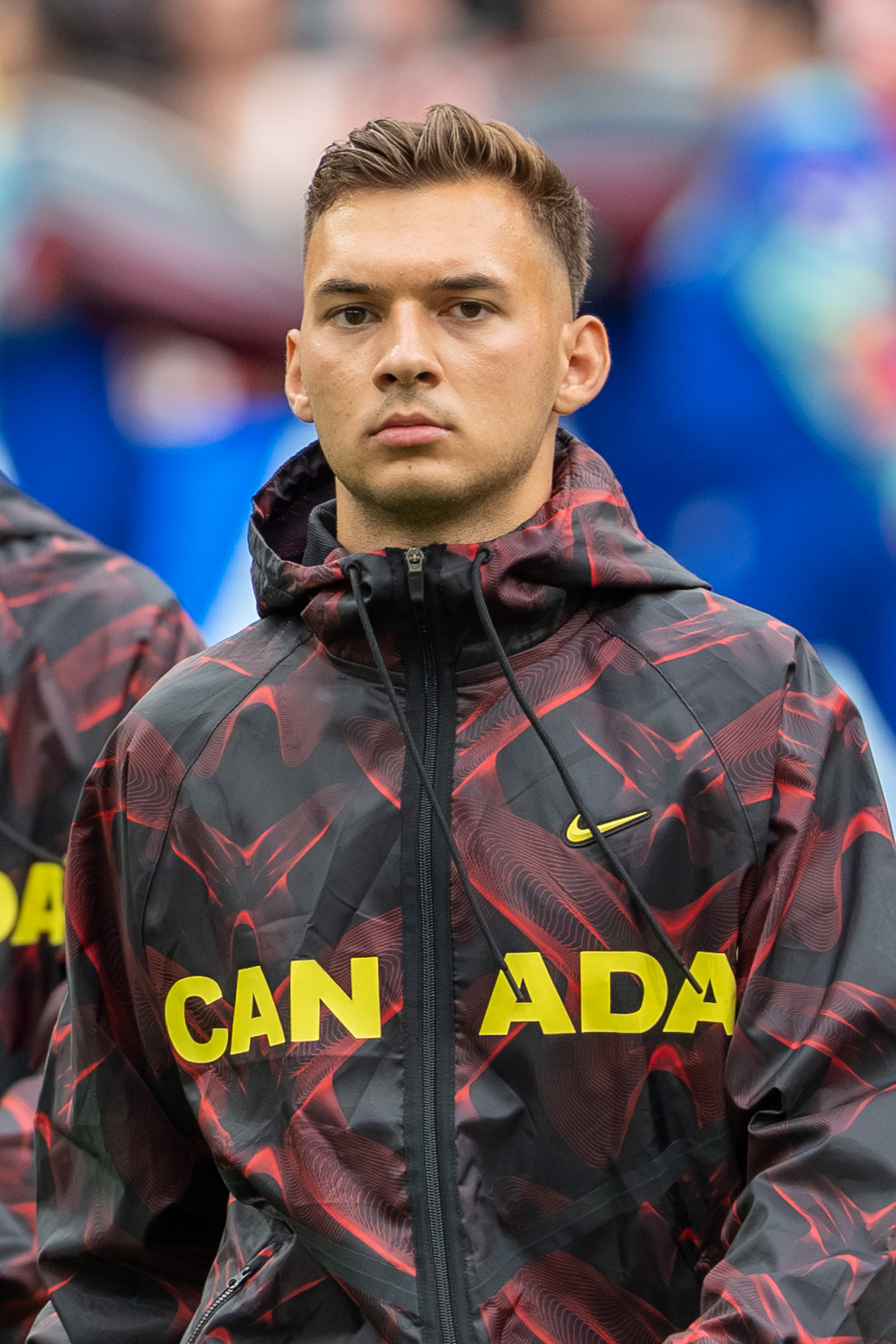
- Sigur with Canada in 2026

Personal information
- Full name: Niko Kristian Sigur
- Date of birth: September 9, 2003 (age 23)
- Place of birth: Burnaby, British Columbia, Canada
- Height: 1.80 m (5 ft 11 in)
- Positions: Defensive midfielder; right back

Team information
- Current team: Toulouse
- Number: 14

Youth career
- 2016–2018: Mountain United FC
- 2018: Vancouver Whitecaps FC
- 2021: Vaughan Azzurri
- 2022: Radomlje
- 2022–2023: Hajduk Split

College career
Years	Team	Apps	(Gls)
2021	York Lions	11	(2)

Senior career*
Years	Team	Apps	(Gls)
2023–2026	Hajduk Split	100	(5)
2026–	Toulouse	7	(0)

International career^{‡}
2023–2024	Croatia U21	6	(0)
2024–	Canada	27	(2)
- * Club domestic league appearances and goals as of November 6, 2026 ‡ National team caps and goals as of November 16, 2026

Niko Kristian Sigur (born September 9, 2003) is a Canadian professional soccer player who plays as a defensive midfielder or right-back for Ligue 1 club Toulouse and the Canada national team.

== Early life ==
Sigur was born in Burnaby, British Columbia, and first began playing soccer with Mountain United FC in Burnaby, in which he won the 2018 BCSPL League Cup title. He was then selected to play for the Whitecaps FC Academy, winning the USSDA Northwest Division championship in 2018. He attended at Notre Dame Regional Secondary School at the high school level, where he won the 2019 BC AA provincial championship.

== University career ==
Sigur played one year of university soccer at York University in 2021. During his university career, he started in 10 of 11 matches, scoring two goals and registering one assist. He was named York's athlete of the week in November for his semifinal play-off performance, which saw him score the winning goal against Ryerson in the 119th minute and recording an assist in the same game. York would later finish with a silver medal the OUA championship during his only season.

== Club career ==
=== Academy ===
Sigur played for Vaughan Azzurri's "C" team in 2021, making two appearances for the club in the League1 Ontario Reserve Division. Sigur moved to Slovenia in early 2022, joining Radomlje youth team.

=== Hajduk Split ===
In 2022, Sigur transferred to Hajduk Split in Croatia to play for their academy, registering two goals and three assists in his first youth season. He was ineligible to play in Hajduk Split's historic UEFA Youth League run due to a special rule where older players in the junior ages must have at least two years of club experience in order to be eligible to play.

Due to injuries of Dino Mikanović and Gergő Lovrencsics, Sigur made his official senior debut as a right back in a 2–0 victory against Varaždin on April 22, 2023. He scored his first goal for Hajduk Split against Varaždin on February 24, 2024.

=== Toulouse ===
On September 1, 2026, Sigur joined Ligue 1 club Toulouse, becoming the second Canadian player in the club's history. The transfer fee was reportedly $6.5 million.

== International career ==
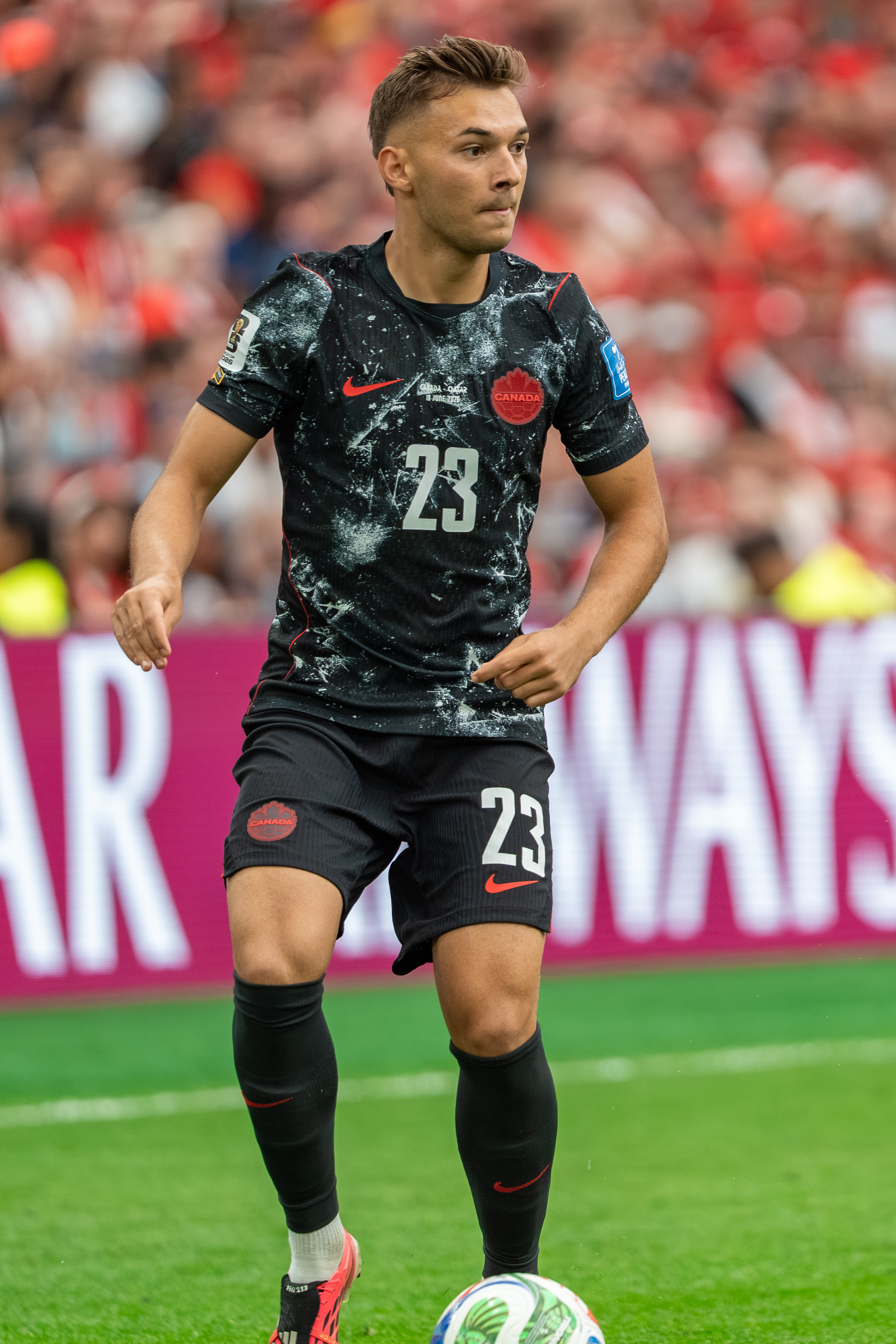
Sigur with Canada at the 2026 FIFA World Cup

Sigur holds dual citizenship of Canada and Croatia. In 2023, he received call-ups to the Croatia U21 ahead of the 2023 UEFA European Under-21 Championship and the Canadian national team, and opted to represent the former.

In May 2024, Sigur was named as a standby player for the Croatia senior national team ahead of UEFA Euro 2024.

In August 2024, the Croatian Football Federation announced that Sigur had decided to switch his international allegiance and would be representing Canada. On August 27, he was officially called up by Canada for two friendly matches against the United States and Mexico. Sigur made his debut in a goalless friendly draw against the latter opponent on September 10.

In June 2025, Sigur was named to the squad for the 2025 CONCACAF Gold Cup. On June 17 in Canada's opening game against Honduras, he would score his first international goal in a 6-0 victory at BC Place. He was named to the Gold Cup Group Stage Best XI after scoring his first goal and recording an assist during the group stage.

In May 2026, Sigur was selected for Canada's squad for the 2026 FIFA World Cup.

== Style of play ==
Sigur is described as a very technical midfielder who can impact the game on both ends. He regards himself as a defensive midfielder who can also play in several midfield positions. Sigur also plays as right back, as shown on his senior professional debut.

== Career statistics ==
=== Club ===
As of match played November 6, 2026

Appearances and goals by club, season and competition
Club	Season	League			National cup (Note: Includes Croatian Cup)		Europe		Other		Total	
Club	Season	Division	Apps	Goals	Apps	Goals	Apps	Goals	Apps	Goals	Apps	Goals
Hajduk Split	2022–23	HNL	7	0	1	0	—		—		8	0
Hajduk Split	2023–24	HNL	34	1	2	0	2 (Note: Appearance(s) in UEFA Conference League)	0	1 (Note: Appearance in Croatian Super Cup)	0	39	1
Hajduk Split	2024–25	HNL	28	3	3	0	1	0	—		32	3
Hajduk Split	2025–26	HNL	29	1	2	0	4	0	—		35	1
Hajduk Split	2026–27	HNL	2	0	—		5 (Note: One appearance in UEFA Europa League, four appearances in UEFA Conference League)	0	—		7	0
Hajduk Split	Total		100	5	8	0	12	0	1	0	121	5
Toulouse	2026–27	Ligue 1	7	0	0	0	—		—		7	0
Career total			107	5	8	0	12	0	1	0	128	5

=== International ===
As of match played November 16, 2026

Appearances and goals by national team and year
National team	Year	Apps	Goals
Canada	2024	2	0
Canada	2025	13	2
Canada	2026	12	0
Total		27	2

Scores and results list Canada's goal tally first.

List of international goals scored by Niko Sigur
No.	Date	Venue	Cap	Opponent	Score	Result	Competition
1	June 17, 2025	BC Place, Vancouver, Canada	6	Honduras	1–0	6–0	2025 CONCACAF Gold Cup
2	September 5, 2025	Arena Națională, Bucharest, Romania	10	Romania	3–0	3–0	Friendly

== Honours ==
Hajduk Split

- Croatian Cup: 2022–23
