= Martin Baturina =

Croatia international footballer (born 2003)

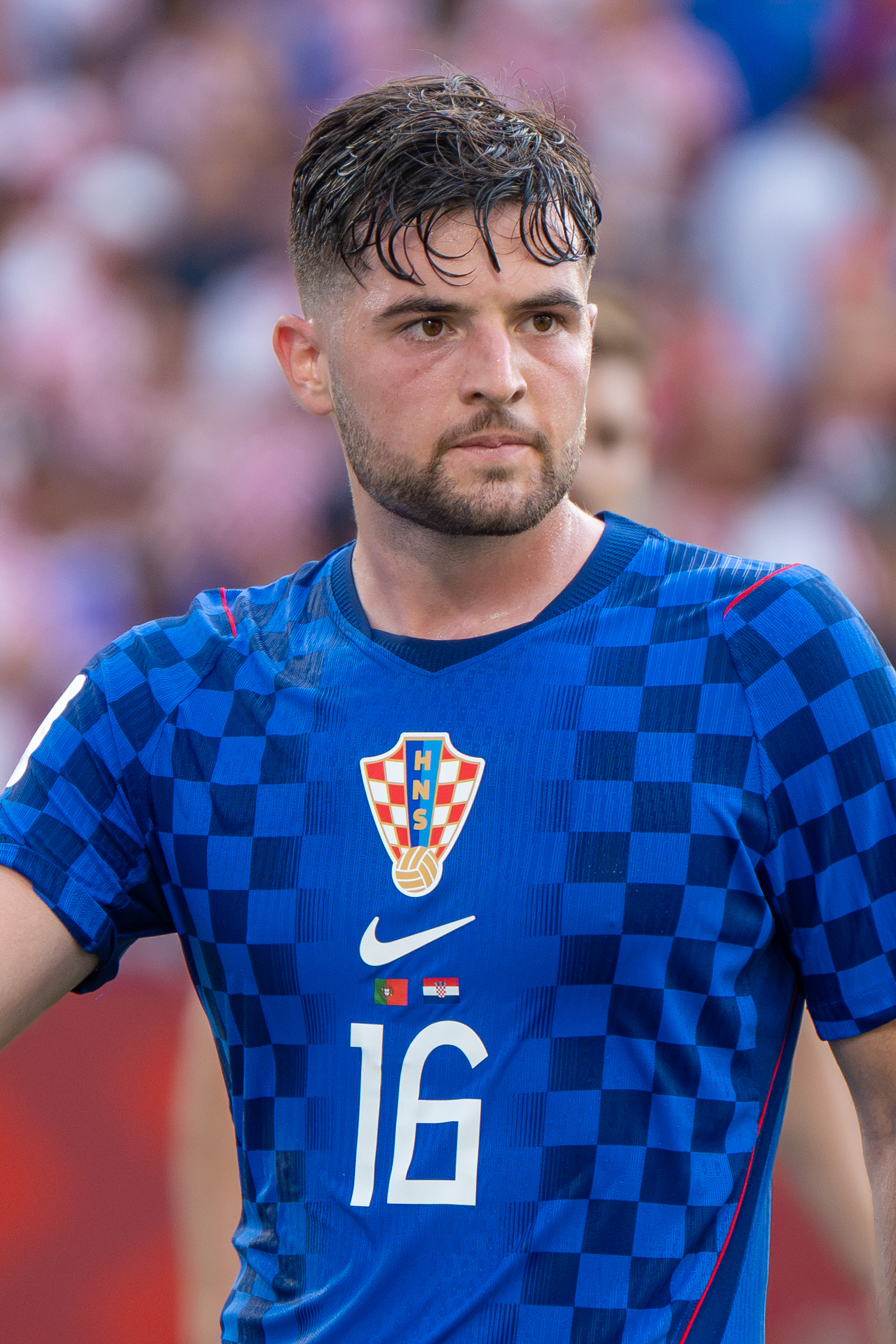
- Baturina with Croatia in 2026

Personal information
- Full name: Martin Baturina
- Date of birth: 16 February 2003 (age 23)
- Place of birth: Zurich, Switzerland
- Height: 1.72 m (5 ft 8 in)
- Positions: Attacking midfielder; left midfielder

Team information
- Current team: Como
- Number: 20

Youth career
- –2015: Hajduk Split
- 2015–2017: RNK Split
- 2017–2021: Dinamo Zagreb

Senior career*
Years	Team	Apps	(Gls)
2021–2025	Dinamo Zagreb	114	(17)
2025–	Como	38	(9)

International career^{‡}
2017–2018	Croatia U15	6	(0)
2018	Croatia U16	2	(0)
2021	Croatia U18	1	(0)
2022	Croatia U19	1	(0)
2021–2024	Croatia U21	14	(2)
2023–	Croatia	27	(2)
- * Club domestic league appearances and goals as of 09:39, 5 November 2026 (UTC) ‡ National team caps and goals as of 15 November 2026

Martin Baturina (born 16 February 2003) is a professional footballer who plays as an attacking midfielder or left midfielder for Serie A club Como. Born in Switzerland, he plays for the Croatia national team.

== Club career ==
=== Dinamo Zagreb ===
Baturina made his debut for Dinamo Zagreb II on 14 February 2021, when Dinamo's second team lost to Bijelo Brdo 1–0. He made his debut for Dinamo Zagreb's first team on 16 May 2021 in the 2020–21 season, in which they defeated Gorica 3–0. He made his debut in the Croatian Football Cup on 22 September, when Dinamo defeated Orient 4–1. Eight days later, he made his debut in the UEFA Europa League against Genk, which Dinamo won 3–0.

He scored his first goal for Dinamo on 5 March 2022 in a 3–0 victory over Šibenik. On the final matchday of the 2021–22 season, he scored a goal and provided an assist in a 3–1 win over Hajduk Split. On 6 September 2022, he debuted in the UEFA Champions League, in which Dinamo beat Chelsea 1–0. On 15 July 2023, he scored the only goal in the Super Cup match against Hajduk Split.

=== Como ===
On 17 June 2025, Baturina signed a five-year contract with Serie A club Como. Later that year, on 24 November, he scored his first goal for the club in a 5–1 away victory over Torino. He finished his first season with the club with eight goals in Serie A, helping Como secure its first-ever qualification for the UEFA Champions League. On 10 September 2026, he scored Como's first-ever Champions League goal in a 4–1 victory over RB Leipzig.

== International career ==
=== Youth ===
Baturina has made appearances for the Croatian youth national teams of U15, U16, U18, U19, and U21.

=== Senior ===
Baturina received his first call-up to Croatia by head coach Zlatko Dalić for the Euro 2024 Qualifiers. On 18 November, he made his debut as a substitute in a 2–0 away win against Latvia.

On 20 May 2024. he was selected in the 26-man squad for the UEFA Euro 2024.

On 18 May 2026, Baturina was selected in the 26-man squad for the 2026 FIFA World Cup. On 17 June 2026, he scored his first World Cup goal against England to equalize at 1–1 in an eventual 4–2 defeat.

== Style of play ==
Baturina has been described as one of Croatia's most exciting youth prospects. Similarly to his compatriot Luka Modrić, he has been noted for his ability as a playmaker who can find space and provide key passes for a goal. He has also been praised for his first touch and ability to dribble and operate in tight spaces.

== Personal life ==
Baturina is the son of former Croatian international Mate Baturina. He was born in Zurich during his father's stint with Grasshoppers, however he was raised in Split, Croatia, before moving to Zagreb at the age of 14. His older brother, Roko, is also a professional footballer.

== Career statistics ==
=== Club ===
As of match played 4 November 2026

Appearances and goals by club, season and competition
Club	Season	League			National cup (Note: Includes Croatian Cup, Coppa Italia)		Europe		Other		Total	
Club	Season	Division	Apps	Goals	Apps	Goals	Apps	Goals	Apps	Goals	Apps	Goals
Dinamo Zagreb	2020–21	Prva HNL	2	0	0	0	0	0	—		2	0
Dinamo Zagreb	2021–22	Prva HNL	13	2	2	0	3 (Note: One appearance in UEFA Champions League, two appearances in UEFA Europa League)	0	—		18	2
Dinamo Zagreb	2022–23	HNL	34	6	3	0	11 (Note: Appearances in UEFA Champions League)	0	1 (Note: Appearance in Croatian Super Cup)	0	49	6
Dinamo Zagreb	2023–24	HNL	32	5	3	1	15 (Note: Three appearances in UEFA Champions League, two appearances and one goal in UEFA Europa League, nine appearances in UEFA Europa Conference League)	1	1	1	51	8
Dinamo Zagreb	2024–25	HNL	33	4	2	0	10	2	—		45	6
Dinamo Zagreb	Total		114	17	10	1	39	3	2	1	165	22
Como	2025–26	Serie A	29	6	5	2	—		—		34	8
Como	2026–27	Serie A	9	3	0	0	4	2	—		13	5
Como	Total		38	9	5	2	4	2	0	0	47	13
Career total			152	26	15	3	43	5	2	1	212	35

=== International ===
As of match played 15 November 2026

Appearances and goals by national team and year
National team	Year	Apps	Goals
Croatia	2023	2	0
Croatia	2024	7	1
Croatia	2025	6	0
Croatia	2026	12	1
Total		27	2

Scores and results list Croatia's goal tally first, score column indicates score after each Baturina goal.

List of international goals scored by Martin Baturina
No.	Date	Venue	Cap	Opponent	Score	Result	Competition
1	15 October 2024	Stadion Narodowy, Warsaw, Poland	7	Poland	3–1	3–3	2024–25 UEFA Nations League A
2	17 June 2026	AT&T Stadium, Arlington, United States	20	England	1–1	2–4	2026 FIFA World Cup

== Honours ==
Dinamo Zagreb

- Prva HNL: 2021–22, 2022–23
- Croatian Super Cup: 2022, 2023

Individual

- Football Oscar Team of the Year: 2023
- Football Oscar Best Prva HNL U-21 player: 2023
- Top 100 Stars 2024
- Serie A Rising Star of the Month: January 2026
