= Bruno Durdov =

Croatian footballer

Personal information
- Date of birth: 11 December 2007 (age 18)
- Place of birth: Split, Croatia
- Height: 1.75 m (5 ft 9 in)
- Position: Winger

Team information
- Current team: Górnik Zabrze
- Number: 34

Youth career
- 2013–2015: GOŠK Kaštela
- 2015–2024: Hajduk Split

Senior career*
Years	Team	Apps	(Gls)
2024–2026	Hajduk Split	45	(3)
2026–	Górnik Zabrze	0	(0)

International career^{‡}
2022	Croatia U15	4	(1)
2023–2024	Croatia U17	12	(2)
2024	Croatia U18	2	(0)
2024–2025	Croatia U19	10	(2)
2025–	Croatia U21	2	(0)
- * Club domestic league appearances and goals as of 20:45, 14 June 2026 (UTC) ‡ National team caps and goals as of 20:45, 14 June 2026 (UTC)

Bruno Durdov (born 11 December 2007) is a Croatian professional footballer who plays as a winger for Ekstraklasa club Górnik Zabrze.

== Club career ==
=== Hajduk Split ===
Durdov joined the Hajduk Split youth system in 2015. He made his debut for the senior team on 5 May 2024, coming on as a substitute against Varaždin at Stadion Poljud, aged 16. Durdov made his European debut on 25 July 2024 against Havnar Bóltfelag. He scored his first two goals in a HNL round 7 match against Gorica, and in doing so became Hajduk's youngest ever scorer in the HNL. On 15 October 2024, he was named by English newspaper The Guardian as one of the best players born in 2007 worldwide.

=== Górnik Zabrze ===
On 17 June 2026, Durdov signed a three-year contract with Polish Ekstraklasa club Górnik Zabrze.

== International career ==
Durdov made his debut for Croatia national under-17 team on 15 August 2023 in a friendly match against Iceland. He scored his first goal on 6 November against the Faroe Islands in the 2024 UEFA European Under-17 Championship qualification match. On 17 May 2024, Durdov was included in the national team for the tournament. He made his debut at the 2024 UEFA European Under-17 Championship in the second match of the group stage against Denmark. Durdov, who started in the starting line-up in the last group stage game against Wales, scored with a direct corner kick. However, the national team lost in that match and failed to qualify for the knockout stage, taking third place in the group.
