= Mateo Jurić-Petrašilo =

Croatian footballer (born 2004)

Personal information
- Date of birth: 30 November 2004 (age 21)
- Place of birth: Split, Croatia
- Height: 1.90 m (6 ft 3 in)
- Position: Centre-back

Team information
- Current team: Spartak Varna
- Number: 3

Youth career
- 2015–2018: Val
- 2018–2023: Hajduk Split

Senior career*
Years	Team	Apps	(Gls)
2023–2024	Hajduk Split	1	(0)
2023	→ Solin (loan)	8	(0)
2024–	Spartak Varna	65	(0)
- * Club domestic league appearances and goals as of 23:14, 2 June 2026 (UTC)

Mateo Jurić-Petrašilo (born 30 November 2004) is a Croatian professional footballer who plays as a centre-back for Bulgarian First League club Spartak Varna.

== Club career ==
Jurić-Petrašilo is an youth player of Hajduk Split, coming from Val. In the summer of 2023 he moved on loan to Solin and returned to Hajduk in December. He signed with Spartak Varna from Hajduk Split in the summer of 2024. He quickly established himself as a regular started and during the mid season and interest from clubs from Austria and Germany was reported.

== Career statistics ==
=== Club ===
As of 1 June 2026

Club performance			League		Cup		Continental		Other		Total	
Club	League	Season	Apps	Goals	Apps	Goals	Apps	Goals	Apps	Goals	Apps	Goals
Hajduk Split	1. HNL	2023–24	1	0	0	0	0	0	–		1	0
Solin (loan)	1. NL	2023–24	8	0	0	0	–		–		8	0
Spartak Varna	First League	2024–25	32	0	2	0	–		–		34	0
Spartak Varna	First League	2025–26	33	0	2	0	–		–		35	0
Spartak Varna	Total		65	0	4	0	0	0	0	0	69	0
Career statistics			74	0	4	0	0	0	0	0	78	0
