= Marko Capan =

Croatian footballer (born 2004)

Personal information
- Date of birth: 24 February 2004 (age 22)
- Place of birth: Bjelovar, Croatia
- Height: 1.80 m (5 ft 11 in)
- Position: Midfielder

Team information
- Current team: Žalgiris

Youth career
- –2018: Bjelovar
- 2018–2020: Lokomotiva
- 2020–2023: Hajduk Split

Senior career*
Years	Team	Apps	(Gls)
2023–2026	Hajduk Split	5	(0)
2023–2024	→ Široki Brijeg (loan)	22	(0)
2026–	Žalgiris	20	(3)

International career^{‡}
2018–2019	Croatia U15	8	(0)
2020	Croatia U16	2	(0)
2021–2022	Croatia U18	5	(0)
2023	Croatia U19	3	(0)
- * Club domestic league appearances and goals as of 20 July 2026 ‡ National team caps and goals as of 7 June 2023

Marko Capan (born 24 February 2004) is a Croatian professional footballer who plays as a midfielder for Lithuanian club FK Žalgiris.

== Club career ==
Shortly after Capan made his debut for Hajduk Split in a Prva HNL match against Varaždin in which he assisted a goal to teammate Dario Melnjak, he extended his contract with Hajduk Split until the summer of 2026. On 15 March 2023, Capan captained Hajduk Split's youth team to victory against Borussia Dortmund in the quarterfinals of the 2022–23 UEFA Youth League, in which he scored a goal in the penalty shootout.

== International career ==
Capan has been capped for various Croatian youth national teams.

== Honours ==
Hajduk Split

- Croatian Cup: 2022–23
