= 2026–27 HNK Hajduk Split season =

Hajduk Split
2026–27 season
- Chairman: Ivan Bilić
- Manager: Gonzalo García
- HNL: 1st
- Croatian Cup: Round of 16
- Europa League: Second qualifying round
- Conference League: League phase
- Highest home attendance: 32,136 (vs. Ajax) (15 October 2026)
- Lowest home attendance: 14,549 (vs. Lokomotiva Zagreb) (31 August 2026)
Home colours	Away colours	Third colours

The 2026–27 season is HNK Hajduk Split's 116th season in existence and the club's 36th consecutive season in the top flight of Croatian football. In addition to the domestic league, Hajduk Split are participating in this season's edition of the Croatian Cup, as well as the UEFA Europa League and UEFA Conference League. The season covers the period from 1 July 2026 to 30 June 2027.

== First-team squad ==
For details of former players, see List of HNK Hajduk Split players.

As of 8 September 2026

Note: Flags indicate national team as defined under FIFA eligibility rules; some limited exceptions apply. Players may hold more than one non-FIFA nationality.

No.	Pos.	Nation	Player
1	GK	CRO	Ivica Ivušić
4	MF	ALB	Adrion Pajaziti
5	DF	BEL	Alec Van Hoorenbeeck
6	DF	BIH	Dennis Hadžikadunić
7	FW	GAM	Abdoulie Sanyang
8	MF	FRA	Khalil Fayad
9	MF	BRA	Dalisson de Almeida (on loan from Córdoba)
10	FW	CRO	Marko Livaja (captain)
11	FW	CRO	Michele Šego
14	DF	KOS	Ron Raçi
15	DF	AUT	Dario Marešić
16	MF	CRO	Anđelo Šutalo
17	DF	CRO	Dario Melnjak (vice-captain)
18	MF	BEL	Leander Dendoncker

No.	Pos.	Nation	Player
19	MF	ALB	Etnik Brruti
20	MF	ESP	Alberto del Moral
22	DF	MAD	Mathieu Acapandié
23	FW	CRO	Marin Šotiček (on loan from Basel)
26	MF	UKR	Adam Huram
28	MF	CRO	Roko Brajković
32	DF	CRO	Šimun Hrgović
33	GK	CRO	Toni Silić
36	DF	CRO	Marino Skelin
38	DF	CRO	Luka Hodak
39	MF	UKR	Illia Kutia
44	GK	CRO	Dante Stipica
77	MF	ESP	Carlos Martín (on loan from Atlético Madrid)
99	GK	UKR	Davyd Fesyuk

== Competitions ==
=== Overview ===
Competition	First match	Last match	Starting round	Final position	Record							
Competition	First match	Last match	Starting round	Final position	Pld	W	D	L	GF	GA	GD	Win %
SuperSport HNL	2 August 2026	May 2027	Matchday 1		14	10	2	2	29	12	+17	71.43
Croatian Cup	8 September 2026		First round		1	1	0	0	2	0	+2	100.00
Europa League	9 July 2026	30 July 2026	First qualifying round	Second qualifying round	4	2	0	2	5	6	−1	50.00
Conference League	6 August 2026		Third qualifying round		7	5	1	1	17	8	+9	71.43
Total					26	18	3	5	53	26	+27	69.23

Last updated: 21 November 2026
Source: Soccerway

=== SuperSport HNL ===
==== Classification ====
Pos	Team	Pld	W	D	L	GF	GA	GD	Pts	Qualification or relegation (Note: The 2026–27 Croatian Football Cup winners qualify for the Europa League first qualifying round (or the second-placed team if the Croatian Cup winners finish first). If the Croatian Cup winners finish in the top three, the second Conference League second qualifying round spot will be passed to the fourth-placed team.)
1	Hajduk Split	14	10	2	2	29	12	+17	32	Qualification to Champions League second qualifying round
2	Dinamo Zagreb	12	8	1	3	28	15	+13	25	Qualification to Conference League second qualifying round
3	Varaždin	14	6	4	4	19	14	+5	22	Qualification to Conference League second qualifying round
4	Osijek	13	6	2	5	22	18	+4	20	
5	Istra 1961	13	5	4	4	24	19	+5	19	

Updated to match(es) played on 21 November 2026. Source: SuperSport HNL
Rules for classification: 1) Points; 2) Head-to-head points; 3) Head-to-head goal difference; 4) Head-to-head goals scored (at home if two teams tied); 5) Goal difference; 6) Goals scored; 7) Play-off
(Note: Criteria 2-4 and 7 is only used if deciding champion, teams to international competition or teams for relegation and in that case criteria 6 will not be used).

==== Results summary ====
Overall								Home						Away					
Pld	W	D	L	GF	GA	GD	Pts	W	D	L	GF	GA	GD	W	D	L	GF	GA	GD
14	10	2	2	29	12	+17	32	6	1	0	17	3	+14	4	1	2	12	9	+3

Last updated: 21 November 2026.
Source: SuperSport HNL

==== Results by round ====
Round	1	2	3	4	5	6	7	8	9	10	11	12	13	14	15
Ground	A	H	A	H	H	A	H	A	H	H	A	H	A	A	
Result	L	D	W	W	W	W	W	L	W	W	D	W	W	W	
Position	7	7										1	1	1	

Updated to match(es) played on 21 November 2026. Source: SuperSport HNL
A = Away; H = Home; W = Win; D = Draw; L = Loss

=== Results by opponent ===
Team	Results				Points
Team	1	2	3	4	Points
Dinamo Zagreb	2–1	–	–	–	3
Gorica	2–1	5–0	–	–	6
Istra 1961	2–2	2–2	–	–	2
Lokomotiva	2–0	2–1	–	–	6
Osijek	4–0	1–0	–	–	6
Rijeka	0–3	–	–	–	0
Rudeš	4–0	–	–	–	3
Slaven Belupo	1–0	–	–	–	3
Varaždin	1–2	1–0	–	–	3

Source: 2026–27 Croatian Football League article

== Matches ==
=== Friendlies ===
==== Pre-season ====
23 June 2026 Friendly	Shkëndija (North Macedonia)	0–4	(Croatia) Hajduk Split	Radomlje, Slovenia
18:15	Meliqi (yellow card) 76'	Report	Livaja 3'; Pukštas 28'; Šego 66', 75'	Stadium: Sports park Radomlje; Attendance: 0 Referee: Rade Obrenović

27 June 2026 Friendly	LNZ Cherkasy (Ukraine)	0–1	(Croatia) Hajduk Split	Radomlje, Slovenia
18:15		Report	Pukštas 44'	Stadium: Sports park Radomlje; Attendance: 0 Referee: Matjaž Trobec

1 July 2026 Friendly	Celje (Slovenia)	0–1	(Croatia) Hajduk Split	Celje, Slovenia
18:15		Report	Šego 5'; Marešić (yellow card) 81'; Hodak (yellow card) 85'; Pajaziti (yellow card) 90+1'	Stadium: Stadion Z'dežele; Attendance: 4,000; Referee: Anže Šepec

==== On-season (2026) ====
18 July 2026 Friendly	Junak Sinj	1–2	Hajduk Split	Sinj, Croatia
18:00	Glavović 5'	Report	Modrić 50'; Ruso 79'	Stadium: Gradski stadion Attendance: 1000; Referee: Mario Jadrijević Jr.

2 October 2026 Friendly	Croatia Zmijavci	0–3	Hajduk Split	Zmijavci, Croatia
15:30	Matković (yellow card) 30'; Ivkošić (yellow card) 74'	Report	Livaja 23'; Šutalo 53'; Ugwuodo 87'	Stadium: ŠRC Marijan Šuto; Attendance: 2,000; Referee: Ante Znaor

15 November 2026 Friendly	Hamburger SV (Germany)	1–1	(Croatia) Hajduk Split	Hamburg, Germany
15:00	Jatta 81'; Nandja (yellow card) 84'; Akyıldız (yellow card) 86'	Report	Martín 45'; Hrastović (yellow card) 56'	Stadium: Volksparkstadion; Attendance: 54,215; Referee: Harm Osmers

=== SuperSport HNL ===
2 August 2026 1	Varaždin	2–1	Hajduk Split	Varaždin
18:30 CEST (UTC+02:00)	Maglica (yellow card) 47'; Mladenovski 53'; Marina (yellow card) 57'; Mamić 62'	Report	Pajaziti (yellow card) 23'; Pukštas 56'; Acapandié (yellow card) 79'; Livaja (penalty missed) 90'	Stadium: Stadion Varteks; Attendance: 4,849; Referee: Patrik Kolarić (Čakovec)

9 August 2026 2	Hajduk Split	2–2	Istra 1961	Split
21:00 CEST (UTC+02:00)	Pukštas 16'; Šotiček (yellow card) 60'; Livaja 84'; Šutalo (yellow card) 90+7'	Report	Frederiksen 42'; Doumbia (yellow card) 48'; Miettinen (yellow card) 64'; Ahmeti 90+5'	Stadium: Stadion Poljud; Attendance: 20,506; Referee: Mateo Erceg (Benkovac)

16 August 2026 3	Gorica	1–2	Hajduk Split	Velika Gorica
21:00 CEST (UTC+02:00)	Cvijanović (yellow card) 52'; Bogojević 78' (pen.)	Report	Šego 3' (yellow card) 51'; Šutalo (yellow card) 71'; Livaja 87'; Van Hoorenbeeck (yellow card) 90'	Stadium: Stadion Radnik; Attendance: 2,480; Referee: Patrik Pavlešić (Duga Resa)

23 August 2026 4	Hajduk Split	4–0	Osijek	Split
21:00 CEST (UTC+02:00)	Brruti 9'; Livaja 54' (yellow card) 58'; Hodak (yellow card) 62'; Dalisson (yellow card) 79'; Sanyang 83'; Hrgović 90'	Report	Mustafić (red card) 32'; Petrusenko (yellow card) 53'	Stadium: Stadion Poljud; Attendance: 14,976; Referee: Patrik Kolarić (Čakovec)

31 August 2026 5	Hajduk Split	2–0	Lokomotiva	Split
18:30 CEST (UTC+02:00)	Šego 16'; Šotiček 56'; Pajaziti (yellow card) 82'	Report	Smiljanić (yellow card) 22'; Lorber (yellow card) 53' (yellow-red card) 78'	Stadium: Stadion Poljud; Attendance: 14,549; Referee: Ivan Vukančić (Benkovac)

6 September 2026 6	Rudeš	0–4	Hajduk Split	Velika Gorica
18:00 CEST (UTC+02:00)		Report	Šego 5', 28' (pen.); Šotiček 48'; Fayad 87'	Stadium: Stadion Radnik; Attendance: 2,916; Referee: Antonio Škobić (Osijek)

13 September 2026 7	Hajduk Split	1–0	Slaven Belupo	Split
20:00 CEST (UTC+02:00)	Pajaziti (yellow card) 12'; Dalisson 23' (yellow card) 45'; Marešić (yellow card) 83'	Report	Išasegi (yellow card) 20'; Mažar (yellow card) 45+1' (yellow-red card) 79'; Ratshukudu (yellow card) 90+4'	Stadium: Stadion Poljud; Attendance: 15,064; Referee: Patrik Pavlešić (Duga Resa)

20 September 2026 8	Rijeka	3–0	Hajduk Split	Rijeka
17:00 CEST (UTC+02:00)	Ćubelić (yellow card) 4'; Dantas 35'; Lasickas (yellow card) 45'; Vignato 45+3'; Adu-Adjei 58'; Pavić (yellow card) 64'	Report	Raçi (yellow card) 38'; Silić (yellow card) 45+4'; Fayad (yellow card) 75'	Stadium: Stadion Rujevica; Attendance: 7,848; Referee: Mateo Erceg (Benkovac)

10 October 2026 9	Hajduk Split	2–1	Dinamo Zagreb	Split
15:00 CEST (UTC+02:00)	McKenna 24' (o.g.); Sanyang 59'; Raçi (yellow card) 62'; Dalisson (yellow card) 73'	Report	Beljo (yellow card) 14' (goal) 21'; Valinčić (yellow card) 90+16'	Stadium: Stadion Poljud; Attendance: 24,974; Referee: Igor Pajač (Sv. Ivan Zelina)

18 October 2026 10	Hajduk Split	1–0	Varaždin	Split
15:00 CEST (UTC+02:00)	Marešić (yellow card) 33'; Acapandié 86'; Pajaziti (yellow card) 90'	Report	Duvnjak (yellow card) 58'; Latković (yellow card) 63'	Stadium: Stadion Poljud; Attendance: 14,882; Referee: Dario Bel (Osijek)

26 October 2026 11	Istra 1961	2–2	Hajduk Split	Pula
18:00 CET (UTC+01:00)	Hodžić (yellow card) 30'; Jaganjac (yellow card) 39' (goal) 66'; Albarracín (yellow card) 52'; Kablar (yellow card) 70'; Frederiksen 80' (pen.)	Report	Fayad 8'; Hadžikadunić (yellow card) 13'; Šego (yellow card) 39' (goal) 54'	Stadium: Stadion Aldo Drosina; Attendance: 6,614; Referee: Patrik Kolarić (Čakovec)

31 October 2026 12	Hajduk Split	5–0	Gorica	Split
15:00 CET (UTC+01:00)	Huram 23'; Sanyang 34' (yellow card) 62'; Martín 38', 50'; Šutalo 70'; Hadžikadunić (yellow card) 90'	Report	Filipović (yellow card) 18'; Cvijanović (yellow card) 59'	Stadium: Stadion Poljud; Attendance: 11,476; Referee: Filip Dragašević (Zagreb)

8 November 2026 13	Osijek	0–1	Hajduk Split	Osijek
15:00 CET (UTC+01:00)	León (yellow card) 12'; Jelenić (yellow card) 19'; Petrusenko (yellow card) 27'; Kruiver (yellow card) 77'	Report	Fayad (yellow card) 54'; Martín 90' (yellow card) 90'; Acapandié (yellow card) 90+4'	Stadium: Opus Arena; Attendance: 8,746; Referee: Ante Čulina (Zagreb)

21 November 2026 14	Lokomotiva	1–2	Hajduk Split	Zagreb
15:00 CET (UTC+01:00)	Vuković 8'; Čabraja (yellow card) 18'; Triantafyllou (yellow card) 21'; Fetai (yellow card) 43'	Report	Marešić 23' (pen.); Šutalo (yellow card) 32'; Raçi 45'; Fayad (yellow card) 57'	Stadium: Stadion Maksimir; Attendance: 2,810; Referee: Mateo Erceg (Benkovac)

=== Croatian Football Cup ===
8 September 2026 R1	Vardarac	0–2	Hajduk Split	Vardarac
16:30 CEST (UTC+02:00)	Kirchbauer (yellow card) 28'; Horvat (yellow card) 50'; Barišić (yellow card) 65'	Report	Hadžikadunić 18'; Hodak (yellow card) 44'; Gabrić (yellow card) 60'; Ugwuodo 90+3'	Stadium: V Arena; Attendance: 1,055; Referee: Filip Dragašević (Zagreb)

=== UEFA Europa League ===
==== First qualifying round ====
9 July 2026 First leg	Hajduk Split (Croatia)	2–0	(Slovakia) Žilina	Split, Croatia
20:00 CEST (UTC+02:00)	Brajković 22'; Dalisson 49'; Šego (yellow card) 78'; Hrgović (yellow card) 84'	Report	Ďatko (yellow card) 90+2'	Stadium: Stadion Poljud; Attendance: 22,352; Referee: Kyriakos Athanasiou (Cyprus)

16 July 2026 Second leg	Žilina (Slovakia)	2–1 (2–3 agg.)	(Croatia) Hajduk Split	Žilina, Slovakia
20:30 CEST (UTC+02:00)	Roginić 51'; Adang (yellow card) 67'; Melnjak 90+1' (o.g.); Florea (yellow card) 90+2'	Report	Hrgović (yellow card) 21'; Van Hoorenbeeck (yellow card) 30' (goal) 45+2'	Stadium: Štadión pod Dubňom; Attendance: 7,823; Referee: Horațiu Feșnic (Romania)

==== Second qualifying round ====
23 July 2026 First leg	Hajduk Split (Croatia)	2–0	(Cyprus) Pafos	Split, Croatia
21:00 CEST (UTC+02:00)	Pajaziti (yellow card) 4'; Šego 56'; Melnjak 64'; Huram (yellow card) 87'; del Moral (yellow card) 88'	Report	Ioannou (yellow card) 55'; Brito (yellow card) 63'	Stadium: Stadion Poljud; Attendance: 27,752; Referee: Rob Harvey (Ireland)

30 July 2026 Second leg	Pafos (Cyprus)	4–0 (a.e.t.) (4–2 agg.)	(Croatia) Hajduk Split	Limassol, Cyprus
20:00 EEST (UTC+03:00)	Goldar (yellow card) 12' (goal) 90+1'; Guga 40' (yellow card) 45+5'; Šunjić (yellow card) 68'; Biel 93'; Correia 117'	Report	Acapandié (yellow card) 51'; Pukštas (yellow card) 96'	Stadium: Alphamega Stadium; Attendance: 4,169; Referee: Paweł Raczkowski (Poland)

=== UEFA Conference League ===
==== Third qualifying round ====
6 August 2026 First leg	Žalgiris (Lithuania)	2–5	(Croatia) Hajduk Split	Vilnius, Lithuania
20:00 EEST (UTC+03:00)	Kendysh (yellow card) 4'; Bosančić (yellow card) 25'; Petković 35'; Šešplaukis (yellow card) 78'; Capan 86'	Report	Šego 5' (pen.), 44' (penalty missed) 14'; Pukštas (yellow card) 50' (goal) 75'; Pajaziti 55'; Dalisson 72'	Stadium: LFF Stadium; Attendance: 4,975; Referee: Marc Nagtegaal (Netherlands)

13 August 2026 Second leg	Hajduk Split (Croatia)	4–0 (9–2 agg.)	(Lithuania) Žalgiris	Split, Croatia
21:00 CEST (UTC+02:00)	Melnjak 54'; Huram 69'; Lupano 80' (o.g.); Šego 83'	Report		Stadium: Stadion Poljud; Attendance: 20,229; Referee: Matthias Jöllenbeck (Germany)

==== Play-off round ====
20 August 2026 First leg	Hajduk Split (Croatia)	2–2	(Poland) Raków Częstochowa	Split, Croatia
21:00 CEST (UTC+02:00)	Šego 21'; Hrgović (yellow card) 33'; Dalisson 48' (yellow card) 62'; Pajaziti (red card) 55'; del Moral (yellow card) 80'; Pukštas (yellow card) 90+4'	Report	Emreli 27'; Otieno (yellow card) 31'; Pieńko (yellow card) 82'; Diaby-Fadiga 90+5'	Stadium: Stadion Poljud; Attendance: 25,362; Referee: Michal Očenáš (Slovakia)

27 August 2026 Second leg	Raków Częstochowa (Poland)	2–3 (a.e.t.) (4–5 agg.)	(Croatia) Hajduk Split	Częstochowa, Poland
19:00 CEST (UTC+02:00)	Ameyaw (yellow card) 51'; Diaby-Fadiga 61' (pen.); Emreli 88' (yellow card) 89'	Report	Raçi 2'; Sigur (yellow card) 51'; Acapandié (yellow card) 62'; Šego 66'; Pukštas 94'	Stadium: Miejski Stadion Piłkarski Raków; Attendance: 5,500; Referee: Aliyar Aghayev (Azerbaijan)

==== League phase ====
Pos	Team	Pld	W	D	L	GF	GA	GD	Pts	Qualification
11	(Netherlands) Ajax	3	2	0	1	9	3	+6	6	Advance to knockout phase play-offs (seeded)
12	(Turkey) Trabzonspor	3	2	0	1	6	3	+3	6	Advance to knockout phase play-offs (seeded)
13	(Croatia) Hajduk Split	3	2	0	1	3	2	+1	6	Advance to knockout phase play-offs (seeded)
14	(Germany) SC Freiburg	3	2	0	1	4	5	−1	6	Advance to knockout phase play-offs (seeded)
15	(Serbia) Red Star Belgrade	3	1	1	1	6	6	0	4	Advance to knockout phase play-offs (seeded)

Updated to match(es) played on 5 November 2026. Source: UEFA
Rules for classification: League phase tiebreakers

15 October 2026 1	Hajduk Split (Croatia)	2–1	(Netherlands) Ajax	Split, Croatia
18:45 CEST (UTC+02:00)	Sanyang 37'; del Moral (yellow card) 45+1'; Šotiček 55'; Šego (yellow card) 60'	Report	Klaassen 53'; Baas (yellow card) 90+6'	Stadium: Stadion Poljud; Attendance: 32,136; Referee: Christian-Petru Ciochirca (Austria)

22 October 2026 2	Thun (Switzerland)	0–1	(Croatia) Hajduk Split	Thun, Switzerland
21:00 CEST (UTC+02:00)	Roth (yellow card) 57'; Reichmuth (yellow card) 73'	Report	Dalisson 17'; del Moral (yellow card) 47'; Marešić (yellow card) 64'; Šego (penalty missed) 68'	Stadium: Stockhorn Arena; Attendance: 10,000; Referee: Jarred Gillett (England)

5 November 2026 3	Lincoln Red Imps (Gibraltar)	1–0	(Croatia) Hajduk Split	Gibraltar
18:45 CET (UTC+01:00)	Rutjens (yellow card) 29'; Gómez (yellow card) 49'; Torrilla (yellow card) 78'; Hadžikadunić 89' (o.g.)	Report	Šotiček (yellow card) 58'; Sanyang (yellow card) 63'; Acapandié (yellow card) 90+5'; Marešić (yellow card) 90+7'	Stadium: Europa Sports Park; Attendance: 1,309; Referee: Patryk Gryckiewicz (Poland)

26 November 2026 4	Hajduk Split (Croatia)	v	(Belgium) Sint-Truiden	Split, Croatia
21:00 CET (UTC+01:00)		Report		Stadium: Stadion Poljud

10 December 2026 5	Hajduk Split (Croatia)	v	(Denmark) Nordsjælland	Split, Croatia
21:00 CET (UTC+01:00)		Report		Stadium: Stadion Poljud

17 December 2026 6	Midtjylland (Denmark)	v	(Croatia) Hajduk Split	Herning, Denmark
21:00 CET (UTC+01:00)		Report		Stadium: MCH Arena

== Player seasonal records ==
Updated 21 November 2026

=== Goals ===
Rank	Name	League	Europe	Cup	Total
1	(Croatia) Michele Šego	5	6	–	11
2	(Brazil) Dalisson de Almeida	1	4	–	5
3	(The Gambia) Abdoulie Sanyang	3	1	–	4
3	(United States) Rokas Pukštas	2	2	–	4
5	(Croatia) Marko Livaja	3	–	–	3
5	(Spain) Carlos Martín	3	–	–	3
5	(Croatia) Marin Šotiček	2	1	–	3
8	(France) Khalil Fayad	2	–	–	2
8	(Ukraine) Adam Huram	1	1	–	2
8	(Kosovo) Ron Raçi	1	1	–	2
8	(Croatia) Dario Melnjak	–	2	–	2
12	(Madagascar) Mathieu Acapandié	1	–	–	1
12	(Albania) Etnik Brruti	1	–	–	1
12	(Croatia) Šimun Hrgović	1	–	–	1
12	(Austria) Dario Marešić	1	–	–	1
12	(Croatia) Anđelo Šutalo	1	–	–	1
12	(Croatia) Roko Brajković	–	1	–	1
12	(Albania) Adrion Pajaziti	–	1	–	1
12	(Belgium) Alec Van Hoorenbeeck	–	1	–	1
12	(Bosnia and Herzegovina) Dennis Hadžikadunić	–	–	1	1
12	(Nigeria) Peter Ugwuodo	–	–	1	1
Own goals		1	1	–	2
TOTALS		29	22	2	53

Source: Competitive matches

=== Clean sheets ===
Rank	Name	League	Europe	Cup	Total
1	(Croatia) Toni Silić	7	4	–	11
2	(Croatia) Dante Stipica	–	–	1	1
TOTALS		7	4	1	12

Source: Competitive matches

=== Disciplinary record ===
Number	Position	Player	HNL			Europe			Croatian Cup			Total		
Number	Position	Player	Yellow card	(yellow card) (yellow-red card)	Red card	Yellow card	(yellow card) (yellow-red card)	Red card	Yellow card	(yellow card) (yellow-red card)	Red card	Yellow card	(yellow card) (yellow-red card)	Red card
3	DF	(Croatia) Roko Gabrić	0	0	0	0	0	0	1	0	0	1	0	0
4	MF	(Albania) Adrion Pajaziti	4	0	0	1	0	1	0	0	0	5	0	1
5	DF	(Belgium) Alec Van Hoorenbeeck	1	0	0	1	0	0	0	0	0	2	0	0
6	DF	(Bosnia and Herzegovina) Dennis Hadžikadunić	2	0	0	0	0	0	0	0	0	2	0	0
7	FW	(The Gambia) Abdoulie Sanyang	1	0	0	1	0	0	0	0	0	2	0	0
8	MF	(France) Khalil Fayad	3	0	0	0	0	0	0	0	0	3	0	0
8	MF	(Canada) Niko Sigur	0	0	0	1	0	0	0	0	0	1	0	0
9	FW	(Brazil) Dalisson de Almeida	3	0	0	1	0	0	0	0	0	4	0	0
10	FW	(Croatia) Marko Livaja	1	0	0	0	0	0	0	0	0	1	0	0
11	FW	(Croatia) Michele Šego	2	0	0	2	0	0	0	0	0	4	0	0
14	DF	(Kosovo) Ron Raçi	2	0	0	0	0	0	0	0	0	2	0	0
15	DF	(Austria) Dario Marešić	2	0	0	2	0	0	0	0	0	4	0	0
16	MF	(Croatia) Anđelo Šutalo	3	0	0	0	0	0	0	0	0	3	0	0
20	MF	(Spain) Alberto del Moral	0	0	0	4	0	0	0	0	0	4	0	0
21	MF	(United States) Rokas Pukštas	0	0	0	3	0	0	0	0	0	3	0	0
22	DF	(Madagascar) Mathieu Acapandié	2	0	0	3	0	0	0	0	0	5	0	0
23	FW	(Croatia) Marin Šotiček	1	0	0	1	0	0	0	0	0	2	0	0
26	FW	(Ukraine) Adam Huram	0	0	0	1	0	0	0	0	0	1	0	0
32	DF	(Croatia) Šimun Hrgović	0	0	0	3	0	0	0	0	0	3	0	0
33	GK	(Croatia) Toni Silić	1	0	0	0	0	0	0	0	0	1	0	0
38	DF	(Croatia) Luka Hodak	1	0	0	0	0	0	1	0	0	2	0	0
77	FW	(Spain) Carlos Martín	1	0	0	0	0	0	0	0	0	1	0	0
TOTALS			30	0	0	24	0	1	2	0	0	56	0	1

=== Appearances and goals ===
Number	Position	Player	Apps	Goals	Apps	Goals	Apps	Goals	Apps	Goals
Number	Position	Player	Total		HNL (Note: First number represents appearances in starting eleven, while the second number indicates a substitute appearance.)		Europe		Croatian Cup	
3	DF	(Croatia) Roko Gabrić	4	0	2+1	0	0+0	0	1+0	0
4	MF	(Albania) Adrion Pajaziti	15	1	7+1	0	7+0	1	0+0	0
5	DF	(Belgium) Alec Van Hoorenbeeck	19	1	5+3	0	6+4	1	1+0	0
6	DF	(Bosnia and Herzegovina) Dennis Hadžikadunić	12	1	4+4	0	3+0	0	1+0	1
7	FW	(The Gambia) Abdoulie Sanyang	23	4	7+6	3	6+3	1	0+1	0
8	MF	(France) Khalil Fayad	12	2	6+2	2	3+0	0	1+0	0
8	MF	(Canada) Niko Sigur	7	0	2+0	0	2+3	0	0+0	0
9	FW	(Brazil) Dalisson de Almeida	24	5	8+4	1	10+1	4	0+1	0
10	FW	(Croatia) Marko Livaja	20	3	4+5	3	1+9	0	1+0	0
11	FW	(Croatia) Michele Šego	24	11	11+2	5	10+1	6	0+0	0
14	DF	(Kosovo) Ron Raçi	11	2	6+0	1	3+2	1	0+0	0
15	DF	(Austria) Dario Marešić	22	1	11+1	1	9+1	0	0+0	0
16	MF	(Croatia) Anđelo Šutalo	17	1	6+3	1	1+6	0	1+0	0
17	DF	(Croatia) Dario Melnjak	18	2	3+5	0	5+4	2	1+0	0
18	MF	(Belgium) Leander Dendoncker	7	0	2+3	0	0+2	0	0+0	0
19	MF	(Albania) Etnik Brruti	7	1	2+3	1	0+2	0	0+0	0
20	MF	(Spain) Alberto del Moral	22	0	11+2	0	4+5	0	0+0	0
21	MF	(United States) Rokas Pukštas	10	4	3+0	2	7+0	2	0+0	0
22	DF	(Madagascar) Mathieu Acapandié	23	1	12+1	1	10+0	0	0+0	0
23	FW	(Croatia) Marin Šotiček	20	3	9+4	2	7+0	1	0+0	0
26	FW	(Ukraine) Adam Huram	19	2	4+7	1	1+6	1	1+0	0
28	FW	(Croatia) Roko Brajković	3	1	0+0	0	3+0	1	0+0	0
32	DF	(Croatia) Šimun Hrgović	23	1	12+2	1	9+0	0	0+0	0
33	GK	(Croatia) Toni Silić	25	0	14+0	0	11+0	0	0+0	0
36	DF	(Croatia) Marino Skelin	3	0	0+0	0	1+2	0	0+0	0
37	MF	(Croatia) Noa Skoko	1	0	0+0	0	1+0	0	0+0	0
38	DF	(Croatia) Luka Hodak	6	0	2+2	0	0+1	0	1+0	0
42	FW	(Nigeria) Peter Ugwuodo	1	1	0+0	0	0+0	0	0+1	1
44	GK	(Croatia) Dante Stipica	1	0	0+0	0	0+0	0	1+0	0
77	FW	(Spain) Carlos Martin	12	3	1+7	3	0+3	0	1+0	0

== Transfers ==
=== In ===
Date	Position	Player	From	Fee
29 May 2026	MF	(Albania) Etnik Brruti	(Kosovo) Malisheva	Free
11 June 2026	MF	(Croatia) Anđelo Šutalo	(Croatia) Dinamo Zagreb	Free
25 June 2026	DF	(Belgium) Alec Van Hoorenbeeck	(Netherlands) Twente	€200,000
26 June 2026	DF	(Madagascar) Mathieu Acapandié	(France) Nantes	Free
28 June 2026	MF	(Spain) Alberto del Moral	(Spain) Real Oviedo	Free
29 June 2026	FW	(Brazil) Dalisson de Almeida	(Spain) Córdoba	Loan
30 June 2026	DF	(Croatia) Ivan Krstanović	Croatia Zmijavci	Loan ended
30 June 2026	DF	(Australia) Fran Karačić	(Croatia) Osijek	Loan ended
30 June 2026	MF	(Croatia) Dominik Babić	Croatia Zmijavci	Loan ended
30 June 2026	MF	(Croatia) Mihael Žaper	(Slovenia) Radomlje	Loan ended
29 July 2026	MF	(Croatia) Marin Šotiček	(Switzerland) Basel	Loan
17 August 2026	DF	(Bosnia and Herzegovina) Dennis Hadžikadunić	(Russia) Rostov	Free
1 September 2026	MF	(France) Khalil Fayad	(France) Montpellier	€250,000
2 September 2026	MF	(Belgium) Leander Dendoncker	(Spain) Real Oviedo	Free
2 September 2026	MF	(Spain) Carlos Martín	(Spain) Atlético Madrid	Loan

Total Spending: ▼€450,000

=== Out ===
Date	Position	Player	To	Fee
31 May 2026	DF	(Ivory Coast) Ismaël Diallo	(Portugal) Vizela	Free
31 May 2026	MF	(Australia) Anthony Kalik	(Lithuania) Kauno Žalgiris	End of contract
11 June 2026	MF	(Croatia) Luka Jurak	(Croatia) Kustošija	End of contract
16 June 2026	FW	(Croatia) Bruno Durdov	(Poland) Górnik Zabrze	€900,000
30 June 2026	MF	(Spain) Iker Almena	(Saudi Arabia) Al Qadsiah	Loan ended
30 June 2026	FW	(Croatia) Ante Rebić		End of contract
1 July 2026	DF	(Croatia) Zvonimir Šarlija	(Qatar) Al Shahaniya	Free (released)
21 July 2026	FW	(Croatia) Lovre Lončar	(Croatia) Slaven Belupo	Undisclosed
27 July 2026	MF	(Spain) Hugo Guillamón	(Spain) Sporting Gijón	Free (released)
27 July 2026	MF	(Croatia) Filip Krovinović	(Brazil) Grêmio	Free (released)
29 July 2026	DF	(Croatia) Ivan Krstanović	(Bosnia and Herzegovina) Široki Brijeg	Loan
7 August 2026	MF	(Croatia) Noa Skoko	(Croatia) Rudeš	Loan
18 August 2026	GK	(Croatia) Ivan Pocrnjić	(Croatia) Uskok	Dual registration
18 August 2026	FW	(Croatia) Dominik Babić	(Croatia) Uskok	Dual registration
19 August 2026	DF	(Croatia) Mateo Čupić	(Croatia) Uskok	Dual registration
19 August 2026	DF	(Croatia) Roko Gabrić	Croatia Zmijavci	Dual registration
19 August 2026	DF	(Croatia) Duje Milišić	Croatia Zmijavci	Dual registration
19 August 2026	FW	(Nigeria) Peter Ugwuodo	Croatia Zmijavci	Dual registration
25 August 2026	DF	(Australia) Fran Karačić	(Croatia) Lokomotiva Zagreb	Loan
31 August 2026	MF	(United States) Rokas Pukštas	(England) Middlesbrough	€5,000,000
1 September 2026	MF	(Canada) Niko Sigur	(France) Toulouse	€4,000,000
7 September 2026	MF	(Croatia) Mihael Žaper	(Slovenia) Radomlje	Loan

Total Income: ▲€9,900,000

Total expenditure: ▲€9,450,000

=== Promoted from youth squad ===
Position	Player	Age
DF	(Croatia) Roko Gabrić	19
FW	(Ukraine) Adam Huram	17
MF	(Ukraine) Illia Kutia	18
