= Illia Kutia =

Ukrainian footballer (born 2008)

Personal information
- Full name: Illia Pavlovych Kutia
- Date of birth: 7 March 2008 (age 18)
- Place of birth: Ukraine
- Positions: Midfielder; right-back

Team information
- Current team: Hajduk Split
- Number: 39

Youth career
- 2015–2022: Shakhtar Donetsk
- 2022–2026: Hajduk Split

Senior career*
Years	Team	Apps	(Gls)
2026–	Hajduk Split	1	(0)

International career^{‡}
2024	Ukraine U16	2	(0)
2024–2025	Ukraine U17	7	(0)
2025–2026	Ukraine U18	10	(0)
2026–	Ukraine U19	3	(0)
- * Club domestic league appearances and goals as of 17 June 2026 ‡ National team caps and goals as of 17 June 2026

Illia Pavlovych Kutia (Ukrainian: Ілля Павлович Кутья; born 7 March 2008) is a Ukrainian professional footballer who plays as a midfielder for Croatian Football League club Hajduk Split.

== Club career ==
Kutia joined the Shakhtar Donetsk academy in 2015. In 2022, the academy was evacuated to Croatia due to the 2022 Russian invasion of Ukraine, and Kutia joined the HNK Hajduk Split academy in August of said year, alongside his teammate Dmytro Zudin.

He made his first-team debut in a 6–3 win against Vukovar 1991, coming in for Luka Hodak in the 77th minute.

== International career ==
Kutia is a Ukraine youth international.
