= Dennis Hadžikadunić =

Bosnian footballer (born 1998)

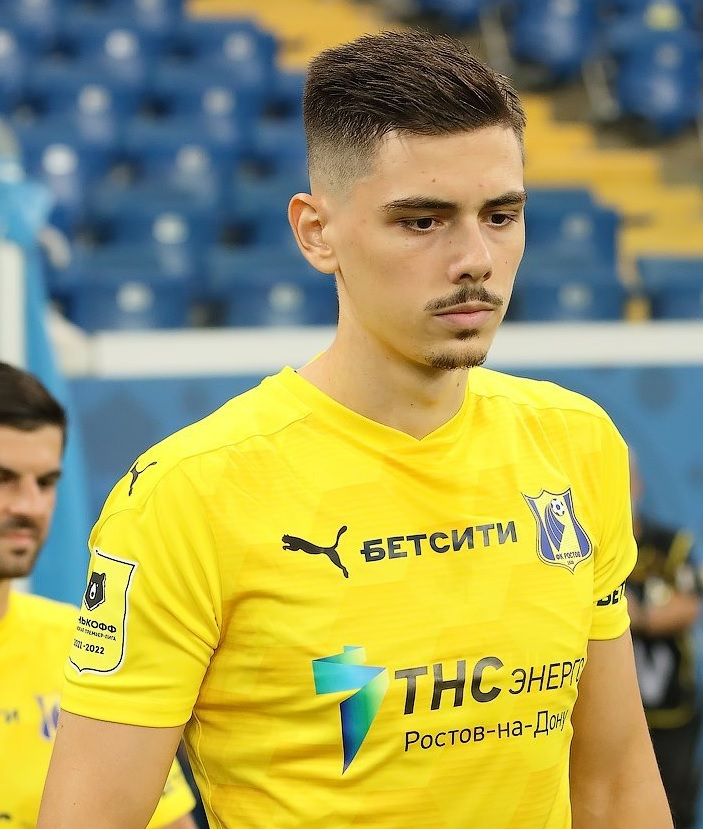
- Hadžikadunić with Rostov in 2021

Personal information
- Date of birth: 9 July 1998 (age 28)
- Place of birth: Malmö, Sweden
- Height: 1.90 m (6 ft 3 in)
- Position: Centre-back

Team information
- Current team: Hajduk Split
- Number: 6

Youth career
- 2005–2012: BK Olympic
- 2012–2016: Malmö FF

Senior career*
Years	Team	Apps	(Gls)
2016–2018	Malmö FF	5	(0)
2018	→ Trelleborgs FF (loan)	10	(0)
2018–2026	Rostov	60	(2)
2022	→ Malmö FF (loan)	25	(1)
2023	→ Mallorca (loan)	8	(0)
2023–2025	→ Hamburger SV (loan)	49	(2)
2025–2026	→ Sampdoria (loan)	28	(0)
2026–	Hajduk Split	8	(0)

International career^{‡}
2014–2015	Sweden U17	15	(0)
2015–2017	Sweden U19	15	(1)
2018–2019	Sweden U21	7	(0)
2020–	Bosnia and Herzegovina	33	(0)
- * Club domestic league appearances and goals as of 8 November 2026 ‡ National team caps and goals as of 24 June 2026

Dennis Hadžikadunić (pronounced [dêːnis xǎdʒikadunitɕ]; born 9 July 1998) is a professional footballer who plays as a centre-back for Croatian Football League club Hajduk Split. Born in Sweden, he plays for the Bosnia and Herzegovina national team.

Hadžikadunić started his professional career at Malmö FF, who sent him on loan to Trelleborgs FF in 2018. Later that year, he joined Rostov, who loaned him back to Malmö FF in 2022, to Mallorca in 2023, to Hamburger SV later that year and to Sampdoria in 2025. The following year, he moved to Hajduk Split.

A former Swedish youth international, Hadžikadunić made his senior international debut for Bosnia and Herzegovina in 2020, earning over 30 caps since. He represented the nation at the 2026 FIFA World Cup.

== Club career ==
=== Malmö FF ===
Hadžikadunić started playing football at a local club BK Olympic, before joining the youth academy of his hometown team Malmö FF in 2012. In September 2016, he signed his first professional contract with the squad. On 26 October, he made his professional debut against Gefle at the age of 18. He won his first trophy with the club on 16 October 2017, when they were crowned league champions.

In January 2018, he was loaned to Trelleborgs FF until the end of the season.

=== Rostov ===
In July, Hadžikadunić was transferred to Russian side Rostov. He made his official debut for the squad against Dynamo Moscow on 10 November. On 8 July 2020, he scored his first professional goal against Ufa.

In March 2022, he was loaned to his former club Malmö FF until the end of the season.

In January 2023, he was sent on a six-month loan to Spanish outfit Mallorca.

In July, he was loaned to German side Hamburger SV for the remainder of the campaign. In July 2024, his loan was extended for an additional season.

In September 2025, he was sent on a season-long loan to Italian team Sampdoria.

=== Hajduk Split ===
In August 2026, Hadžikadunić signed a two-year deal with Croatian outfit Hajduk Split. He made his competitive debut for the club on 31 August against Lokomotiva. On 8 September, he scored his first goal for Hajduk Split in a Croatian Cup game against Vardarac.

== International career ==
Despite representing Sweden at all youth levels, Hadžikadunić decided to play for Bosnia and Herzegovina at the senior level.

In September 2020, his request to change sports citizenship from Swedish to Bosnian was approved by FIFA. Later that month, he received his first senior call up, for the UEFA Euro 2020 qualifying play-offs against Northern Ireland and 2020–21 UEFA Nations League A games against the Netherlands and Poland. He debuted against the Netherlands on 11 October.

In June 2026, Hadžikadunić was named in Bosnia and Herzegovina's squad for the 2026 FIFA World Cup. He made his tournament debut in the last group match against Qatar on 24 June.

== Career statistics ==
=== Club ===
As of match played 8 November 2026

Appearances and goals by club, season and competition
Club	Season	League			National cup (Note: Includes Svenska Cupen, Russian Cup, DFB-Pokal, Croatian Cup)		Continental		Total	
Club	Season	Division	Apps	Goals	Apps	Goals	Apps	Goals	Apps	Goals
Malmö FF	2016	Allsvenskan	1	0	0	0	–		1	0
Malmö FF	2017	Allsvenskan	4	0	0	0	0	0	4	0
Malmö FF	Total		5	0	0	0	0	0	5	0
Trelleborgs FF (loan)	2018	Allsvenskan	10	0	2	0	–		12	0
Rostov	2018–19	Russian Premier League	8	0	4	1	–		12	1
Rostov	2019–20	Russian Premier League	17	1	2	0	–		19	1
Rostov	2020–21	Russian Premier League	25	1	1	0	1 (Note: Appearance in UEFA Europa League)	0	27	1
Rostov	2021–22	Russian Premier League	10	0	1	0	–		11	0
Rostov	Total		60	2	8	1	1	0	69	3
Malmö FF (loan)	2022	Allsvenskan	25	1	2	0	12 (Note: Three appearances in UEFA Champions League; nine appearances in UEFA Europa League)	0	39	1
Mallorca (loan)	2022–23	La Liga	8	0	–		–		8	0
Hamburger SV (loan)	2023–24	2. Bundesliga	24	1	3	0	–		27	1
Hamburger SV (loan)	2024–25	2. Bundesliga	25	1	0	0	–		25	1
Hamburger SV (loan)	Total		49	2	3	0	–		52	2
Sampdoria (loan)	2025–26	Serie B	28	0	–		–		28	0
Hajduk Split	2026–27	Croatian Football League	8	0	1	1	3 (Note: Appearances in UEFA Conference League)	0	12	1
Career total			193	5	16	2	16	0	225	7

=== International ===
As of match played 24 June 2026

Appearances and goals by national team and year
National team	Year	Apps	Goals
Bosnia and Herzegovina
Bosnia and Herzegovina	2020	4	0
Bosnia and Herzegovina	2021	10	0
Bosnia and Herzegovina	2022	5	0
Bosnia and Herzegovina	2023	6	0
Bosnia and Herzegovina	2024	3	0
Bosnia and Herzegovina	2025	2	0
Bosnia and Herzegovina	2026	3	0
Total		33	0

== Honours ==
Malmö FF

- Allsvenskan: 2016, 2017
- Svenska Cupen: 2021–22
