= Mindaugas Nikoličius =

Lithuanian football manager (born 1983)

- Born: 5 October 1983 (age 42); Lithuania
- Occupation: Sporting director
- Children: 1

Mindaugas Nikoličius (born 5 October 1983) is a Lithuanian football executive who was most recently the sporting director of Ekstraklasa club Widzew Łódź.

== Early life ==
Nikoličius initially studied law prior to becoming a sports manager.

== Career ==
In 2005, Nikoličius became the team manager of the Lithuania national team. The following year, he was appointed as sporting director of Scottish side Hearts, where he stayed until the end of 2008.

From 2010 to 2017, he was the sporting director of Lithuanian outfit Žalgiris, and oversaw the club win 15 domestic competitions during his tenure.

In 2018, he was appointed as sporting director and vice-chairman of Croatian side Gorica, helping the club achieve promotion.

In 2021, he joined fellow Croatian Football League club Hajduk Split's executive staff.

On 5 March 2025, he was announced as the new sporting director of Polish Ekstraklasa side Widzew Łódź. He left the club on 12 November that year.

== Personal life ==
Nikoličius married a Croatian woman and has a daughter.
