= Roko Brajković =

Croatian footballer

Personal information
- Date of birth: 17 August 2005 (age 21)
- Place of birth: Split, Croatia
- Height: 1.76 m (5 ft 9 in)
- Position: Winger

Team information
- Current team: Hajduk Split
- Number: 28

Youth career
- Solin
- 2013–2022: Hajduk Split

Senior career*
Years	Team	Apps	(Gls)
2022–	Hajduk Split	40	(4)
2023–2024	→ Solin (loan)	18	(2)

International career^{‡}
2019	Croatia U15	4	(4)
2020	Croatia U16	2	(0)
2022	Croatia U17	2	(0)
2022	Croatia U18	3	(0)
2022–2024	Croatia U19	14	(6)
2025–	Croatia U21	5	(0)
- * Club domestic league appearances and goals as of 24 May 2026 ‡ National team caps and goals as of 16:17, 15 August 2026 (UTC)

Roko Brajković (born 17 August 2005) is a Croatian professional footballer who plays as a winger for Croatian Football League club Hajduk Split.

== Career ==
A youth product of Solin, Brajković moved to Hajduk Split's academy in 2013 at the age of 8, and worked his way up through their youth categories. He made his senior and professional debut with Hajduk Split as a late substitute in a 2–1 Croatian Football League win over Hrvatski Dragovoljac on 29 April 2022. In June 2022, he signed his first professional contract with the club, which ran until 2024. On 28 May 2023, he scored his first-ever goal in his first-ever start, a 3–0 league win over Šibenik. At 17 years, 10 months, and 25 days old, he became the fifth youngest goalscorer in Hajduk Split's history.

== International career ==
Brajković is a youth international for Croatia, having played in all youth levels up to the Croatia U21s.

== Career statistics ==
As of match played 24 July 2026

Appearances and goals by club, season and competition
Club	Season	League			Croatian Cup		Europe		Other		Total	
Club	Season	Division	Apps	Goals	Apps	Goals	Apps	Goals	Apps	Goals	Apps	Goals
Hajduk Split	2021–22	Prva HNL	1	0	—		—		—		1	0
Hajduk Split	2022–23	Prva HNL	5	1	0	0	—		—		5	1
Hajduk Split	2023–24	Prva HNL	2	0	1	0	—		—		3	0
Hajduk Split	2024–25	Prva HNL	11	0	1	0	0	0	—		12	0
Hajduk Split	2025–26	Prva HNL	21	3	3	1	4 (Note: Appearances in UEFA Conference League)	0	—		28	4
Hajduk Split	2026–27	Prva HNL	0	0	0	0	3 (Note: Appearances in UEFA Europa League)	1	—		3	1
Hajduk Split	Total		40	4	5	1	7	1	0	0	52	6
Solin (loan)	2023–24	1. NL	18	2	0	0	—		—		18	2
Career total			58	6	5	1	7	1	0	0	52	6
