= Šimun Hrgović =

Croatian footballer (born 2004)

Personal information
- Date of birth: 20 March 2004 (age 22)
- Place of birth: Vukovar, Croatia
- Height: 1.73 m (5 ft 8 in)
- Position: Left-back

Team information
- Current team: Hajduk Split
- Number: 32

Youth career
- –2013: Radnički Vukovar
- 2013–2019: Cibalia
- 2019–2023: Hajduk Split

Senior career*
Years	Team	Apps	(Gls)
2023–	Hajduk Split	70	(1)
2023–2024	→ Solin (loan)	16	(0)

International career^{‡}
2021–2022	Croatia U18	8	(0)
2022	Croatia U19	3	(0)
2024–	Croatia U21	15	(0)
- * Club domestic league appearances and goals as of 24 August 2026 ‡ National team caps and goals as of 16:38, 15 August 2026 (UTC)

Šimun Hrgović (born 20 March 2004) is a Croatian professional footballer who plays as a left-back for Croatian Football League club Hajduk Split.

== Career ==
On 12 November 2023, Šimun made his debut for Hajduk Split against Varaždin coming in as a substitute for Ismaël Diallo in the 75th minute.

== Career statistics ==
As of match played 24 August 2026

Appearances and goals by club, season and competition
Club	Season	League			Croatian Cup		Europe		Other		Total	
Club	Season	Division	Apps	Goals	Apps	Goals	Apps	Goals	Apps	Goals	Apps	Goals
Solin (loan)	2023–24	1. NL	16	0	0	0	—		—		16	0
Hajduk Split	2023–24	Prva HNL	8	0	1	0	0	0	—		9	0
Hajduk Split	2024–25	Prva HNL	29	0	1	0	0	0	—		30	0
Hajduk Split	2025–26	Prva HNL	29	0	3	0	4 (Note: Appearances in UEFA Conference League)	0	—		36	0
Hajduk Split	2026–27	Prva HNL	4	1	0	0	6 (Note: Appearances in UEFA Europa League)	0	—		10	1
Hajduk Split	Total		70	1	5	0	10	0	0	0	85	1
Career total			86	1	5	0	10	0	0	0	101	1
