= Anđelo Šutalo =

Croatian footballer (born 2007)

Personal information
- Date of birth: 1 January 2007 (age 19)
- Place of birth: Metković, Croatia
- Position: Midfielder

Team information
- Current team: Hajduk Split
- Number: 16

Youth career
- –2022: Neretva
- 2022–2026: Dinamo Zagreb

Senior career*
Years	Team	Apps	(Gls)
2026–	Hajduk Split	8	(1)

International career^{‡}
2023	Croatia U16	2	(0)
2024	Croatia U17	3	(0)
2024–2025	Croatia U18	10	(2)
2025–	Croatia U19	18	(3)
- * Club domestic league appearances and goals as of 8 November 2026 ‡ National team caps and goals as of 8 July 2026

Anđelo Šutalo (born 1 January 2007) is a Croatian professional footballer who plays as a midfielder for Hajduk Split.

== Early life ==
Šutalo was born on 1 January 2007. Born in Metković, Croatia, he is a native of the city.

== Club career ==
As a youth player, Šutalo joined the youth academy of Neretva. Following his stint there, he joined the youth academy of Dinamo Zagreb in 2022, where he played in the UEFA Youth League.

Ahead of the 2026–27 season, he signed for Hajduk Split after receiving interest from Rijeka. On 13 August 2026, he first started for the club during a 4–0 home win over Žalgiris in the UEFA Conference League.

== International career ==
Šutalo is a Croatia youth international. Altogether, he made two appearances and scored zero goals while playing for the Croatia national under-16 football team.

During the spring of 2024, he played for the Croatia national under-17 football team for 2024 UEFA European Under-17 Championship qualification. Two years later, he played for the Croatia national under-19 football team at the 2026 UEFA European Under-19 Championship.

== Style of play ==
Šutaloplays as a midfielder and is right-footed. Croatian newspaper Slobodna Dalmacija rote in 2026 that he "is a midfielder who plays in the number six or number eight position. He is most comfortable when he has teammates in a relationship with him, ideally in a 4-2-3-1 formation".
