= Dario Marešić =

Austrian footballer (born 1999)

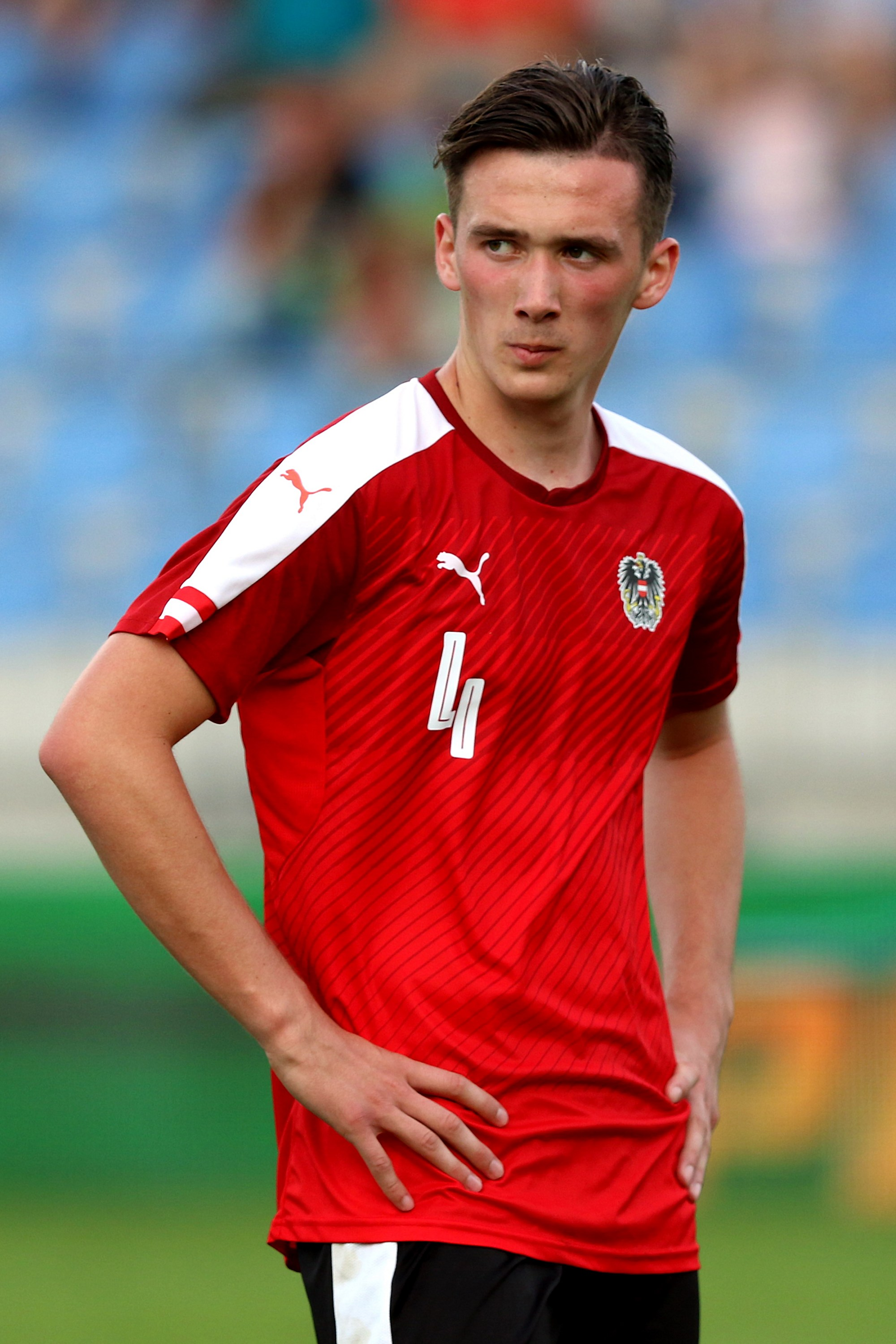
- Marešić in 2017

Personal information
- Date of birth: 29 September 1999 (age 27)
- Place of birth: Graz, Austria
- Height: 1.83 m (6 ft 0 in)
- Position: Defender

Team information
- Current team: Hajduk Split
- Number: 15

Youth career
- 2005-2007: SV MM Frohnleiten
- 2007-2016: Sturm Graz

Senior career*
Years	Team	Apps	(Gls)
2014–2017	Sturm Graz II	41	(0)
2017–2019	Sturm Graz	69	(1)
2019–2020	Reims II	7	(0)
2019–2023	Reims	9	(0)
2021–2022	→ LASK (loan)	8	(0)
2022–2023	→ Istra 1961 (loan)	27	(1)
2023–2026	Istra 1961	84	(5)
2026-	Hajduk Split	216	(1)

International career
2015	Austria U16	8	(0)
2015–2016	Austria U17	11	(0)
2017	Austria U18	1	(0)
2017–2020	Austria U21	21	(1)
- * Club domestic league appearances and goals as of 22 November 2026

Dario Marešić (born 29 September 1999) is an Austrian professional footballer who plays as a defender for Croatian Football League club Hajduk Split.

== Career ==
On 9 May 2018, he played as Sturm Graz beat Red Bull Salzburg in extra time to win the 2017–18 Austrian Cup.

On 27 August 2019, Dario joined French side Stade de Reims.

On 12 July 2022, Marešić joined Istra 1961 in Croatia on loan with an option to buy.

On 17 February 2026, he was announced as the new signing of Hajduk Split, rejoining his former manager at Istra 1961, Gonzalo García.

== Personal life ==
Born in Austria, Marešić is of Croatian descent. He is a youth international for Austria.

== Career statistics ==
=== Club ===
As of match played 24 July 2026

Appearances and goals by club, season and competition
Club	Season	League			National cup (Note: Includes Austrian Cup, Coupe de France, Croatian Cup)		League cup		Continental		Other		Total	
Club	Season	Division	Apps	Goals	Apps	Goals	Apps	Goals	Apps	Goals	Apps	Goals	Apps	Goals
Sturm Graz II	2014–15	Austrian Regionalliga	8	0	—		—		—		—		8	0
Sturm Graz II	2015–16	Austrian Regionalliga	17	0	—		—		—		—		17	0
Sturm Graz II	2016–17	Austrian Regionalliga	8	0	—		—		—		—		8	0
Sturm Graz II	Total		33	0	—		—		—		—		33	0
Sturm Graz	2016–17	Austrian Bundesliga	5	0	—		—		—		—		5	0
Sturm Graz	2017–18	Austrian Bundesliga	34	1	3	0	—		4 (Note: Appearances in UEFA Europa League)	0	—		41	1
Sturm Graz	2018–19	Austrian Bundesliga	29	0	2	0	—		4 (Note: Two appearances in UEFA Champions League, two appearances in UEFA Europa League)	0	—		35	0
Sturm Graz	2019–20	Austrian Bundesliga	1	0	0	0	—		0	0	—		1	0
Sturm Graz	Total		69	1	5	0	—		8	0	—		82	1
Reims B	2019–20	National 2	7	0	—		—		—		—		7	0
Reims	2019–20	Ligue 1	1	0	0	0	0	0	—		—		1	0
Reims	2020–21	Ligue 1	8	0	1	0	0	0	0	0	—		9	0
Reims	Total		9	0	1	0	0	0	0	0	—		10	0
LASK (loan)	2021–22	Austrian Bundesliga	7	0	0	0	—		7 (Note: Appearances in UEFA Conference League)	1	—		14	1
Istra 1961 (loan)	2022–23	HNL	27	1	2	0	—		—		—		29	1
Istra 1961	2023–24	HNL	31	1	2	0	—		—		—		33	1
Istra 1961	2024–25	HNL	33	3	3	1	—		—		—		36	4
Istra 1961	2025–26	HNL	20	1	1	0	—		—		—		21	1
Istra 1961	Total		84	5	6	1	—		—		—		90	6
Hajduk Split	2025–26	HNL	14	0	0	0	—		—		—		14	0
Hajduk Split	2026–27	HNL	0	0	0	0	—		2	0	—		2	0
Hajduk Split	Total		14	0	0	0	—		2	0	0	0	16	0
Career total			250	7	14	1	0	0	17	1	0	0	281	9

== Honours ==
Sturm Graz

- Austrian Cup: 2017–18

Individual

- Austrian Bundesliga Team of the Year: 2017–18
