= Vincent Acapandié =

French footballer (born 1990)

Personal information
- Date of birth: 9 February 1990 (age 36)
- Place of birth: Saint-Pierre, Réunion
- Height: 1.80 m (5 ft 11 in)
- Positions: Defender; midfielder

Team information
- Current team: AS Excelsior

Youth career
- 1995–2000: AJF de Saint-Pierre
- 2000–2004: Saint-Pierroise
- 2004–2010: Auxerre

Senior career*
Years	Team	Apps	(Gls)
2010–2013	Auxerre	5	(1)
2012	→ Arles-Avignon (loan)	17	(0)
2014–2015	Saint-Pierroise		
2015–	AS Excelsior		

International career
2005–2006	France U16	11	(1)
2006–2007	France U17	21	(4)
- * Club domestic league appearances and goals

Vincent Acapandié (born 9 February 1990) is a French footballer who plays for French club AS Excelsior. He plays as a right-sided defender who can also play as a midfielder. He is a French youth international having represented his nation at under-16 and under-17 level. In 2007, he was a part of the under-17 team that played at both the 2007 UEFA European Under-17 Football Championship and 2007 FIFA U-17 World Cup.

== Club career ==
Acapandié was born in Saint-Pierre, Réunion. On 25 May 2010, he signed his first professional contract agreeing to a three-year deal with Auxerre. He made his professional debut on 8 January 2011 appearing as a substitute in a Coupe de France match against Wasquehal. During the 2011–12 season he had a spell with Ligue 2 side AC Arles-Avignon.

In July 2013, he had a trial with English League 1 side Bradford City.

In January 2014, Acapandié signed a one-year contract with Saint-Pierroise.

== Personal life ==
Acapandié is the cousin of the footballers William Gros and Mathieu Acapandié.
