= Davyd Fesyuk =

Ukrainian footballer (born 2005)

Personal information
- Full name: Давид Ігорович Фесюк
- Date of birth: 24 April 2005 (age 21)
- Place of birth: Lutsk, Ukraine
- Height: 1.88 m (6 ft 2 in)
- Position: Goalkeeper

Team information
- Current team: Hajduk Split
- Number: 1

Youth career
- –2021: RSC Hamsik Academy
- 2021–: Hajduk Split

Senior career*
Years	Team	Apps	(Gls)
2022–	Hajduk Split	0	(0)
2024	→ Croatia Zmijavci (loan)	0	(0)

International career^{‡}
2021–2022	Ukraine U17	2	(0)
2023	Ukraine U19	4	(0)
- * Club domestic league appearances and goals ‡ National team caps and goals as of 21 November 2023

Davyd Ihorovych Fesyuk (Ukrainian: Давид Ігорович Фесюк; born 24 April 2005) is a Ukrainian professional footballer who plays as a goalkeeper for Croatian Football League club Hajduk Split.

== Early life ==
Fesyuk was born on 24 April 2005. Born in Lutsk, Ukraine, he is the son of Ukrainian track and field athlete Ihor Fesyuk.

== Club career ==
As a youth player, Fesyuk joined the youth academy of Slovak side RSC Hamsik Academy. In 2021, he joined the youth academy of Croatian side Hajduk Split, helping the club's under-19 team reach the final of the 2022–23 UEFA Youth League and was promoted to the club's senior team in 2022. Subsequently, he was sent on loan to Croatian side Croatia Zmijavci in 2024.

== International career ==
Fesyuk is a Ukraine youth international. From 2021 to 2022, he played for the Ukraine national under-17 team for 2022 UEFA European Under-17 Championship qualification. During November 2023, he played for the Ukraine under-19s for 2024 UEFA European Under-19 Championship qualification.

== Style of play ==
Fesyuk plays as a goalkeeper and is right-footed. Ukrainian news website Sport.ua wrote in 2022 that he has "good footwork. He feels very good in this area. In addition, he has no problems with reaction, playing on exits".
