= Toni Silić =

Croatian footballer (born 2004)

Personal information
- Date of birth: 7 May 2004 (age 22)
- Place of birth: Split, Croatia
- Height: 1.96 m (6 ft 5 in)
- Position: Goalkeeper

Team information
- Current team: Hajduk Split
- Number: 33

Youth career
- –2013: Dugopolje
- 2013–2021: Hajduk Split

Senior career*
Years	Team	Apps	(Gls)
2021	Hajduk Split B	1	(0)
2021–	Hajduk Split	37	(0)
2022–2023	→ Dugopolje (loan)	17	(0)
2023–2024	→ Sheriff Tiraspol (loan)	12	(0)
2024	→ Lokomotiva Zagreb (loan)	1	(0)

International career^{‡}
2018–2019	Croatia U15	3	(0)
2021	Croatia U18	2	(0)
- * Club domestic league appearances and goals as of 15 June 2026 ‡ National team caps and goals as of 16 April 2025

Toni Silić (born 7 May 2004) is a Croatian professional footballer who plays as a goalkeeper for Croatian Football League club Hajduk Split.

== Club career ==
In the summer of 2023, Silić joined Moldavian club Sheriff Tiraspol, on loan with an option to buy at the end of the season.

== Personal life ==
Silić has an older brother, Josip, who is also a professional goalkeeper.
