= Etnik Brruti =

Albanian footballer (born 2004)

Personal information
- Date of birth: 4 March 2004 (age 22)
- Place of birth: Kaçanik, Kosovo under UN administration
- Height: 1.80 m (5 ft 11 in)
- Position: Right winger

Team information
- Current team: Hajduk Split
- Number: 19

Youth career
- New Star Football Academy
- –2020: Prishtina

Senior career*
Years	Team	Apps	(Gls)
2020–2023	Besa Pejë	28	(2)
2023–2026	Malisheva	109	(13)
2026–	Hajduk Split	1	(1)

International career^{‡}
2021–2022	Kosovo U19	6	(0)
2023–2024	Kosovo U21	8	(0)
2025–	Albania U21	2	(0)
- * Club domestic league appearances and goals as of 24 August 2026 ‡ National team caps and goals as of 8 June 2025

Etnik Brruti (born 4 March 2004) is a professional footballer who plays as a right winger for Croatian Football League club Hajduk Split. Born in Kosovo, he represented that nation at youth international levels but in 2025 switched to play for Albania national team.

== Club career ==
=== Early career / Besa Pejë ===
Brruti began his career at one of his hometown clubs, New Star Football Academy and then continued to Prishtina. On 18 September 2020, Brruti joined Kosovo Superleague side Besa Pejë. His debut with Besa Pejë came a day later against Ballkani after being named in the starting line-up.

=== Malisheva ===
In January 2023, Brruti joined Kosovo Superleague side Malisheva. On 11 February 2023, he was named as a Malisheva substitute for the first time in a league match against Ballkani. His debut with Malisheva came eleven days later against Ferizaj after coming on as a substitute at 70th minute in place of Alban Shillova.

== International career ==
=== Kosovo ===
From 2021, until 2024, Brruti has been part of Kosovo at youth international level, respectively has been part of the under-19 and under-21 teams and he with these teams played fourteen matches. On 9 January 2025, Brruti received a call-up from Kosovo national senior team for a three-day training camp in Pristina.

=== Albania ===
On 7 March 2025, Brruti received the Albanian passport and this paved the way for him to represent Albania. Eight days later, he received a call-up from Albania for the 2026 FIFA World Cup qualification matches against England and Andorra. Two days after call-up, his request to switch international allegiance to Albania was approved by FIFA. On 25 May 2025, he received another call-up from Albania, but now from the under-21 team for the friendly matches against Hungary and Turkey. His debut with Albania U21 came eleven days later in the friendly match against Hungary after being named in the starting line-up.

== Honours ==
Kosovo U19

- Roma Caput Mundi: 2022
