= Dalisson de Almeida =

Brazilian footballer (born 2000)

Personal information
- Full name: Dalisson de Almeida Leite
- Date of birth: 6 April 2000 (age 26)
- Place of birth: Maceió, Brazil
- Height: 1.72 m (5 ft 8 in)
- Position: Winger

Team information
- Current team: Hajduk Split (on loan from Córdoba)
- Number: 9

Youth career
- Textil Escudo
- 2015–2019: Valladolid

Senior career*
Years	Team	Apps	(Gls)
2019–2022	Valladolid B	46	(1)
2019–2020	→ Escobedo (loan)	16	(1)
2020	Atlético Tordesillas	1	(0)
2022–2023	Racing B	29	(6)
2022–2023	Racing Santander	1	(0)
2023–2025	Pontevedra	62	(18)
2025–	Córdoba	29	(2)
2026–	→ Hajduk Split (loan)	6	(1)
- * Club domestic league appearances and goals as of 7 August 2026

Dalisson de Almeida Leite (born 6 April 2000), known as Dalisson or Dali, is a Brazilian professional footballer who plays as a right winger for Croatian Football League club HNK Hajduk Split, on loan from Spanish club Córdoba CF. He also holds Spanish nationality.

== Club career ==
Born in Maceió, Alagoas but raised in Cabezón de la Sal, Cantabria, Dalisson joined Real Valladolid's youth setup in 2015, from SD Textil Escudo. He made his senior debut with the reserves on 13 January 2019, coming on as a late substitute in a 1–0 Segunda División B away loss against UD San Sebastián de los Reyes.

On 28 August 2019, after finishing his formation, Dalisson was loaned to Tercera División side UM Escobedo. Upon returning, he was initially assigned to farm team Atlético Tordesillas, but only featured once before returning to Valladolid's B-team; on 17 December 2020, he renewed his contract until 2022.

On 6 July 2022, free agent Dalisson signed for Racing de Santander, being initially assigned to the B-side in Segunda Federación. He made his first team – and professional – debut on 1 November, replacing Iñigo Vicente in a 1–1 home draw against Deportivo Alavés in the Segunda División.

On 13 August 2023, Dalisson moved to Pontevedra CF also in the fourth division. On 5 June 2025, after helping the side to achieve promotion to Primera Federación by scoring a career-best 11 goals, he joined division two side Córdoba CF on a two-year deal.

On 29 June 2026, Dalisson was loaned to Croatian Football League side HNK Hajduk Split for one year.
