= Adam Huram =

Ukrainian footballer (born 2009)

Personal information
- Full name: Adam Abdelilah Huram
- Date of birth: 13 March 2009 (age 17)
- Place of birth: Mariupol, Ukraine
- Position: Winger

Team information
- Current team: Hajduk Split
- Number: 26

Youth career
- –2024: Shakhtar Donetsk
- 2024–2026: Hajduk Split

Senior career*
Years	Team	Apps	(Gls)
2026–	Hajduk Split	16	(2)

International career^{‡}
2025	Ukraine U16	3	(0)
2025–	Ukraine U17	12	(2)
- * Club domestic league appearances and goals as of 1 November 2026 ‡ National team caps and goals as of 13 August 2026

Adam Abdelilah Huram (Ukrainian: Адам Абделілах Гурам; born 13 March 2009) is a Ukrainian professional footballer who plays as a winger for Croatian Football League club Hajduk Split.

== Club career ==
Huram joined the Hajduk Split academy in 2024 from the Shakhtar Donetsk academy. On 7 April 2026, Huram made his first-team debut in a 3–1 win against Istra 1961, coming in as a substitute for Marko Livaja.

== Personal life ==
Huram is of Moroccan descent.
