= Alberto del Moral =

Spanish footballer

Personal information
- Full name: Alberto del Moral Saelices
- Date of birth: 20 July 2000 (age 26)
- Place of birth: Villacañas, Spain
- Height: 1.85 m (6 ft 1 in)
- Position: Midfielder

Team information
- Current team: Hajduk Split
- Number: 20

Youth career
- 2014–2015: Unión Adarve
- 2015–2017: Villacañas
- 2017–2019: Córdoba

Senior career*
Years	Team	Apps	(Gls)
2016–2017	Villacañas		
2019–2021	Córdoba B	26	(0)
2020–2021	Córdoba	19	(2)
2021–2024	Villarreal B	95	(2)
2022–2024	Villarreal	1	(0)
2024–2026	Oviedo	12	(1)
2025–2026	→ Córdoba (loan)	20	(0)
2026–	Hajduk Split	0	(0)
- * Club domestic league appearances and goals as of 6 June 2026

Alberto del Moral Saelices (born 20 July 2000) is a Spanish footballer who plays as a midfielder for Croatian club HNK Hajduk Split.

== Club career ==
Born in Villacañas, Toledo, Castilla–La Mancha, del Moral began his career with AD Unión Adarve before joining hometown side CD Villacañas, where he featured with the first team in the Primera Autonómica Preferente. He joined Córdoba CF's youth categories in 2017, aged 17, and made his senior debut with the reserves on 14 April 2019, starting in a 3–0 Tercera División home loss against Betis Deportivo Balompié.

Del Moral started the 2020–21 season with the first team in Segunda División B, and renewed his contract until 2023 on 1 February 2021, being definitely promoted to the main squad. On 14 June, he moved to Villarreal CF's B-team also in the third level, on a three-year deal.

Del Moral was a regular starter for the Yellow Submarine during the 2021–22 campaign, as the side achieved promotion to Segunda División. He made his professional debut with the B-side on 14 August 2022, starting in a 2–0 away win over Racing de Santander.

On 30 October 2022, del Moral made his first team – and La Liga – debut, coming on as a late substitute for Dani Parejo in a 1–0 away loss against Athletic Bilbao. He scored his first professional goal on 6 March of the following year, netting the B's winner in a 1–0 home success over Deportivo Alavés.

On 8 July 2024, del Moral signed a three-year contract with Real Oviedo in the second division. The following 15 January, he returned to Córdoba on a six-month loan deal, and the loan was renewed for a further year on 1 August.

On 27 June 2026, del Moral terminated his link with the Carbayones, and moved abroad to join Croatian side HNK Hajduk Split the following day.
