= Michele Šego =

Croatian footballer

Personal information
- Date of birth: 5 August 2000 (age 26)
- Place of birth: Split, Croatia
- Height: 1.78 m (5 ft 10 in)
- Positions: Forward; left winger

Team information
- Current team: Hajduk Split
- Number: 15

Youth career
- 2007–2010: Omladinac Vranjic
- 2010–2015: Adriatic Split
- 2015–2016: Hajduk Split

Senior career*
Years	Team	Apps	(Gls)
2016–2019	Hajduk Split B	52	(14)
2016–2022	Hajduk Split	10	(1)
2020	→ Slaven Belupo (loan)	8	(0)
2020	→ Bravo (loan)	13	(1)
2021	→ Dugopolje (loan)	16	(8)
2021–2022	→ Varaždin (loan)	25	(7)
2022–2025	Varaždin	76	(9)
2025–	Hajduk Split	59	(18)

International career
2015	Croatia U15	4	(1)
2015–2016	Croatia U16	11	(4)
2016–2017	Croatia U17	17	(4)
2017–2018	Croatia U18	4	(0)
2017–2019	Croatia U19	12	(1)
2018–2022	Croatia U20	6	(1)
2022–2023	Croatia U21	7	(0)
- * Club domestic league appearances and goals as of 26 October 2026

Michele Šego (Croatian pronunciation: [mikêːle ʃêːɡo]; born 5 August 2000) is a Croatian professional footballer who plays as a forward or left winger for Croatian Football League club Hajduk Split.

== Career ==
=== Early career ===
Šego started playing football in the local minnows' NK Omladinac Vranjic' football school. After spending five years in the youth ranks of Adriatic Split, he was hailed as the biggest talent in the club, netting over 50 goals every season. He eventually joined the Croatian national U15 team, before moving on to the Hajduk Split academy at the age of 16.

=== Hajduk Split and loans ===
After a quality display in the first half of the season with Hajduk's reserve team, he got called up for their senior team's League match against Cibalia that took place on 11 February 2018. He scored his first goal for Hajduk's official senior squad match against Istra 1961 on 9 May 2018, netting a volley in a 5–1 victory.

In January 2020, Šego was loaned for until the summer of 2020 to Slaven Belupo. Returning at the end of the season, he was loaned out again in August 2020, this time to Bravo in the Slovenian PrvaLiga for the 2020–21 season.

=== Varaždin ===
In summer 2021, he was loaned to Varaždin, who activated a buy-out clause at the end of the season. Šego stayed in Varaždin for four years, playing more than 100 matches for the club, mainly as a left winger.

=== Return to Hajduk ===
In January 2025, he returned to Hajduk Split for the transfer fee of €600,000. He started to play on the left wing, with Marko Livaja being the striker. However, after the arrival of Ante Rebić and due to Livaja's poor form, Šego has been used as a center forward, scoring four goals in six matches in this position.
