= Mathieu Acapandié =

Footballer (born 2004)

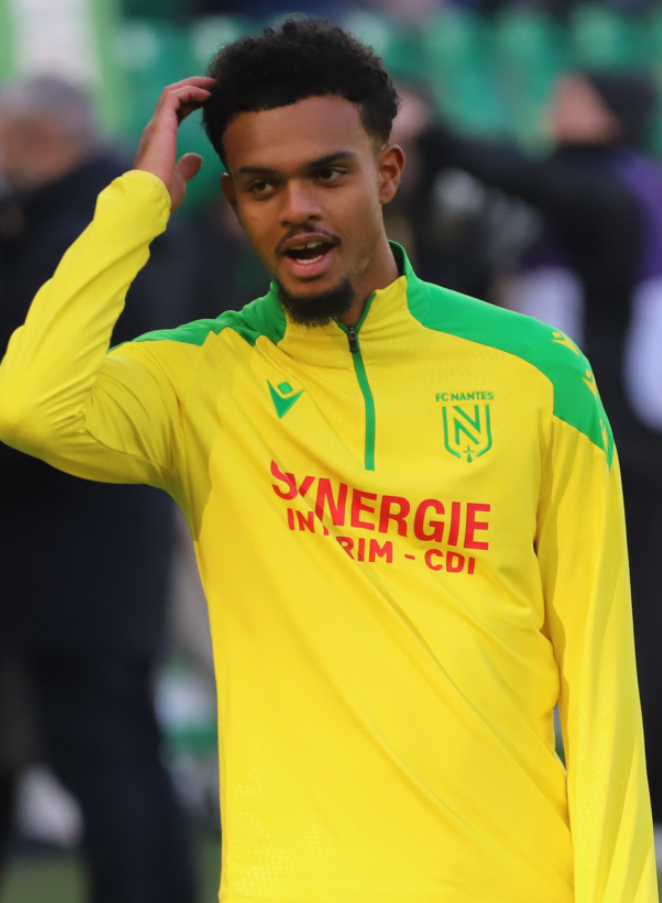
- Acapandié with Nantes

Personal information
- Date of birth: 14 December 2004 (age 21)
- Place of birth: Saint-Pierre, Réunion, France
- Height: 1.82 m (6 ft 0 in)
- Position: Right-back

Team information
- Current team: Hajduk Split
- Number: 22

Youth career
- 2011–2016: EF Saint-Pierre
- 2016–2019: CO Saint-Pierre
- 2019–2022: Nantes

Senior career*
Years	Team	Apps	(Gls)
2022–2023	Nantes B	63	(2)
2023–2026	Nantes	5	(0)
2026–	Hajduk Split	9	(1)

International career^{‡}
2021	France U18	2	(0)
2022	France U19	1	(0)
2025–	Madagascar	2	(0)
- * Club domestic league appearances and goals as of 22:45, 20 October 2026 (UTC) ‡ National team caps and goals as of 8 June 2025

Mathieu Acapandié (born 14 December 2004) is a professional footballer who plays as a right-back for Croatian Football League club Hajduk Split. Born in Réunion, France, he plays for the Madagascar national team.

== Club career ==
Acapandié began playing football in his native Réunion with EF Saint-Pierre and CO Saint-Pierre, before trialing in Metropolitan France in January 2018 with Nantes where he eventually formally joined. He signed his first professional contract with Nantes on 31 March 2022 until 2025, becoming the youngest Réunionnais player to ever sign a pro contract. He made his senior and professional debut with Nantes as a late substitute in a 1–1 (4–2) penalty shootout win over Angers on 8 February 2023. On 26 June 2026, Acapandié signed for Croatian side Hajduk Split following his contract with Nantes expiring.

== International career ==
Acapandié was a youth international for France, having played up to the France U19s. However, he was called up to the Madagascar national team in March 2025. He made his debut on 24 March.

== Personal life ==
Acapandié's cousins, William Gros and Vincent Acapandié, are also a professional footballers.

== Playing style ==
Acapandié began playing as a striker, before moving to midfield for a long time, then centre-back, followed by attacking midfielder, before finally settling as a right-back at Nantes. According to him, he is an offensive full-back who runs a lot and likes to relay with the midfielders.

== Career statistics ==
=== Club ===
As of match played 2 May 2026

Appearances and goals by club, season and competition
Club	Season	League			Coupe de France		Europe		Other		Total	
Club	Season	Division	Apps	Goals	Apps	Goals	Apps	Goals	Apps	Goals	Apps	Goals
Nantes B	2022–23	CFA 2	23	0	—		—		—		23	0
Nantes B	2023–24	National 3	20	0	—		—		—		20	0
Nantes B	2024–25	National 3	14	0	—		—		—		14	0
Nantes B	2025–26	National 3	6	2	—		—		—		6	2
Nantes B	Total		63	2	—		—		—		63	2
Nantes	2022–23	Ligue 1	0	0	1	0	—		—		1	0
Nantes	2024–25	Ligue 1	0	0	0	0	—		—		0	0
Nantes	2025–26	Ligue 1	5	0	1	0	—		—		6	0
Nantes	Total		5	0	2	0	—		—		7	0
Career total			68	2	2	0	0	0	0	0	70	2

=== International ===
As of match played 8 June 2025

Appearances and goals by national team and year
National team	Year	Apps	Goals
Madagascar	2025	2	0
Total		2	0

== Honours ==
Nantes U19

- Championnat National U19: 2021–22, 2022–23
