= Ron Raçi =

Kosovan footballer (born 2002)

Personal information
- Date of birth: 18 September 2002 (age 24)
- Place of birth: Pristina, Kosovo (under UN administration)
- Height: 1.89 m (6 ft 2 in)
- Position: Centre-back

Team information
- Current team: Hajduk Split
- Number: 14

Youth career
- Prishtina
- –2020: Ramiz Sadiku

Senior career*
Years	Team	Apps	(Gls)
2020–2022	Besa Pejë	7	(0)
2022–2023	Trepça '89	2	(0)
2023–2024	Ramiz Sadiku		
2024–2025	Prishtina	27	(2)
2025–	Hajduk Split	30	(1)

International career^{‡}
2025–	Kosovo	6	(0)
- * Club domestic league appearances and goals as of 22 November 2026 ‡ National team caps and goals as of 18 November 2026

Ron Raçi (born 18 September 2002) is a Kosovan professional footballer who plays as a centre-back for Croatian club Hajduk Split and the Kosovo national team.

== Club career ==
=== Early career in Kosovo ===
On 18 September 2020, Raçi joined Kosovo Superleague club Besa Pejë. The next day, he was named as a Besa Pejë substitute for the first time in a Kosovo Superleague match against Ballkani. His debut with Besa Pejë came on 17 October against Prishtina after being named in the starting line-up.

On 11 August 2022, Raçi signed a three-year contract with Kosovo Superleague club Trepça '89. Nine days later, he was named as a Trepça '89 substitute for the first time in a Kosovo Superleague match against Llapi. On 27 August, Raçi debuted against Gjilani, coming on as a substitute at the 68th minute to replace Ardian Muja. In January 2023, he joined Kosovo First League club Ramiz Sadiku. Following his amazing performances with Ramiz Sadiku at the end of the 2022–23 season, Raçi's contract was extended for another year.

On 14 July 2024, Raçi joined Kosovo Superleague club Prishtina. One month later, he was named in a Kosovo Superleague match against Suhareka as a substitute. However, Raçi debuted for the club on 19 October against Malisheva as a starter, whilst scoring his first goal during a 3–1 away victory.

=== Hajduk Split ===
On 26 July 2025, Raçi signed a four-year contract with Croatian Football League club Hajduk Split and received squad number 14.

== International career ==
On 30 May 2025, Raçi received his first call-up by Kosovo for friendly matches against Armenia and Comoros. Ten days later, he debuted in a friendly match against the latter opponent as a starter.

== Honours ==
Prishtina

- Kosovar Cup: 2024–25

Individual

- Kosovo Superleague "Star of the Week" Award: 2024–25 (Rounds 26 and 35)
