= Luka Hodak =

Croatian footballer

Personal information
- Date of birth: 10 June 2006 (age 20)
- Place of birth: Split, Croatia
- Height: 1.70 m (5 ft 7 in)
- Positions: Right-back; defensive midfielder

Team information
- Current team: Hajduk Split
- Number: 38

Youth career
- 2013–2015: Mosor
- 2015–2025: Hajduk Split

Senior career*
Years	Team	Apps	(Gls)
2025–	Hajduk Split	16	(0)

International career^{‡}
2021	Croatia U15	3	(0)
2023–2025	Croatia U19	22	(0)
2025–	Croatia U21	2	(0)
- * Club domestic league appearances and goals as of 15 June 2026 ‡ National team caps and goals as of 26 December 2025

Luka Hodak (born 10 June 2006) is a Croatian professional footballer who plays as a right-back for Croatian Football League club Hajduk Split.

== Club career ==
Hodak joined the Hajduk Split youth system in 2015. He made his league debut for the senior team on 4 October 2025, aged 19, coming in for Fran Karačić in the 73rd minute of a 1–0 away win against Vukovar 1991.

== International career ==
Hodak made his debut for Croatia national under-15 team on 5 May 2021, in a friendly match against Bulgaria, featuring in three matches in the age bracket overall. He would go on to amass 22 caps for the Croatia national under-19 team between 2023 and 2025.
