= HNK Hajduk Split =

Croatian association football club

Hajduk Split
- Full name: Hrvatski nogometni klub Hajduk Split
- Nicknames: "Bili" (Whites), Majstori s mora (Masters from the Sea)
- Short name: HAJ
- Founded: 13 February 1911; 115 years ago
- Ground: Stadion Poljud
- Capacity: 33,803
- Owners: City of Split (65.92%); Naš Hajduk fan assoc. (30.60%); Others (3.48%)
- President: Ivan Bilić
- Head coach: Gonzalo García
- League: Croatian Football League
- 2025–26: Croatian Football League, 2nd of 10
- Website: hajduk.hr
| Home colours | Away colours | Third colours |

Hrvatski nogometni klub Hajduk Split, commonly referred to as Hajduk Split (Croatian pronunciation: [xǎjduːk splît]), is a Croatian professional football club based in Split. They compete in the Croatian Football League (HNL), the top tier of Croatian football. Since 1979, the club's home ground has been the 33,987-seater Stadion Poljud. The team's traditional home colours are white shirts with blue shorts and blue socks.

The idea to form a football club was started by a group of Split students who were studying in Prague. Hajduk was founded on 13 February 1911. They are one of the most successful teams in Croatia, having won six Croatian league championships, eight Croatian cup titles, and five Croatian Super Cup titles. It has one of the "Big Four" clubs – along with Dinamo Zagreb, Rijeka, and Osijek – never relegated from its country's top football league. Hajduk's biggest European achievements are appearances in three European Cup quarter-finals, one UEFA Cup semi-final and one Cup Winners' Cup semi-final.

The club's main rivals are Dinamo Zagreb, with matches between the two referred to as the "Eternal Derby". Hajduk Split fans are called Torcida Split, who are the oldest organized firm in Europe, being founded in 1950.

== History ==
=== Origins ===
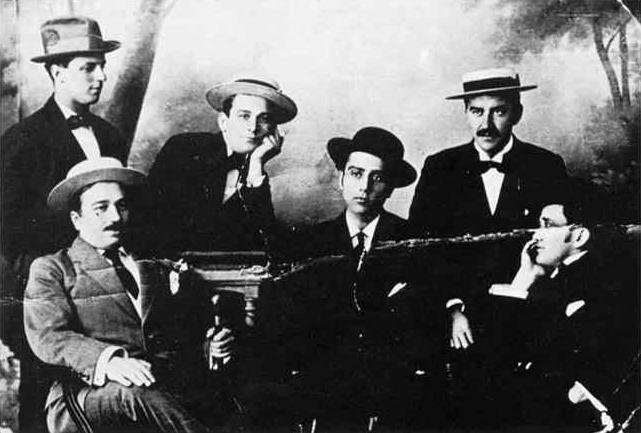
Founding members of Hajduk, in the U Fleků inn in Prague

The club was founded in its city of Split after the idea to form a football club came to the founders during their time studying in Prague. The idea came to them while at the centuries-old pub U Fleků in Prague (then also part of the Austro-Hungarian Empire). The founders were Fabjan Kaliterna, Lucijan Stella, Ivan Šakić and Vjekoslav Ivanišević. They went to the pub following a match between AC Sparta and SK Slavia and decided it was time their own city had a professional football club. They all knew how popular the sport was in their home city of Split, and how well their friends could play.

The club was officially registered with the authorities on 13 February 1911. While trying to come up with a name for the club (other options including "Velebit", "Uskok", "Marjan", and "Jedinstvo"), the students went to their old teacher Josip Barač for advice on what name to give the club. When the students enthusiastically stormed into his office, he told them they charged in like "Hajduks", who were Robin Hood-like guerilla warriors, freedom fighters and Croatian patriots. Professor Barač told them to take the name "Hajduk" which symbolized, as the professor said, "that which is best in our people: bravery, humanity, friendship, love of freedom, defiance to powers, and protection of the weak. Be worthy of that great name".

Hajduks were romanticized outlaws that fought the rule of the Ottoman Turks. It is speculated that famed hajduk Andrijica Šimić, who triumphantly arrived in Split in 1902 to cheering crowds (after a long stint in an Austrian prison), was perhaps the inspiration for the name. The founders subsequently designed the club's emblem, and a group of Catholic nuns from a monastery in Split, created copies which were distributed to fans. Both the name and the checkered board on the crest were found provocative by the Monarchy, but it eventually allowed them having been convinced that a football club is a good way to train soldiers.

Hajduk gathered the pro-Croat party of citizens of Split, Croat unionists or puntari. That is why the club specifically has the name "hrvatski nogometni klub" ("Croatian football club") and has the Croatian coat-of-arms in its crest. The club itself was against the Austrian-Hungarian government's policy of not allowing the unification of the Croatian provinces and keeping them separated (the government and the emperor did not allow the reunion of Dalmatia with the rest of Croatia). Hajduk's first opponent were Calcio Spalato, the club of an autonomist party from in Split, and the match ended with a 9–0 (6–0) victory for Hajduk. The first to score for Hajduk was Šime Raunig, legend has it – with his knee.

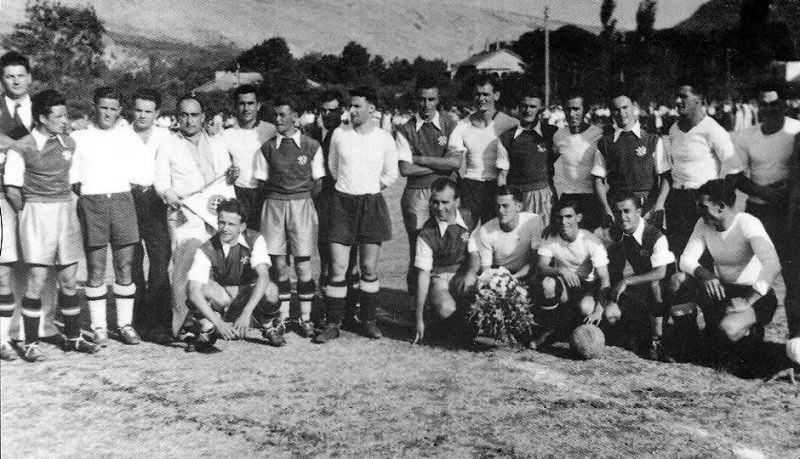
Before the match: Hajduk played HŠK Zrinjski Mostar on 13 August 1939, winning 3–2.

In 1912, Hajduk played their first match in Zagreb against the HAŠK football club, and lost 3–2. The first international match against an eminent opponent was held in 1913 against Czech club Slavia Prague, which at that time were one of the strongest squads in Europe. Hajduk ended up losing the match 1–13 (0–13). After the formation of the Kingdom of the Serbs, Croats, and Slovenes, Hajduk first entered the Yugoslav league in 1923, losing their first and only match that season against SAŠK. However, that same year while on tour in North Africa, Hajduk defeated Marseille 3–2 in their first international match, sparking mass celebrations in Split. The next year, the squad was considered so strong that 10 out of the 11 players which played an international friendly for Yugoslavia against Czechoslovakia were contracted to Hajduk (only exception being the goalkeeper, as Hajduk had an Italian goalkeeper at the time).

In 1926, in honour of the club's 15th birthday, composer Ivo Tijardović dedicated the operetta Kraljica baluna to the club, making it the only football club in the world to have its own operetta. Apart from the national championship, from 1920 to 1936 Hajduk continuously competed in Dalmatian Championship, having won all but one of them.

Hajduk reached their first period of glory in the late 1920s, when they won their first two Yugoslav championships (1927 and 1929), which earned them a slot in the Central European Cup. Some of the best players in that period were Leo Lemešić and Vladimir Kragić, with Ljubo Benčić becoming the best goalscorer of the 1927 season. A long-time coach of the team was one of the club's greats, Luka Kaliterna.

During the 6 January Dictatorship, the adjective "Croatian" in "Croatian Football Club" was forcibly replaced by the adjective "Yugoslav", to the dismay of the team.

The 1930s proved disastrous for Hajduk, as they won no tournaments or championships, recording only a few successes in international matches.

They did manage to win one title during the Banovina of Croatia era in 1940–41, with an impressive 14–3–1 record. As a Croatian champion, the club was about to play the playoffs for Yugoslav championship, but with World War II emerging, the championship was never finished. During this time, Hajduk could have had a fantastic generation led by young Frane Matošić, Ratko Kacijan, and prominent Czech international Jiří Sobotka.

=== World War II ===
In April 1941, during World War II, Yugoslavia was invaded, occupied and carved up by the Axis powers, with Split being annexed directly into Italy. Residents and players were both opposed to the assimilation to Italy, and thus the club ceased to compete in defiance throughout the occupation of Split, declining an offer to join the Italian first division under the name "AC Spalato". Instead, Benito Mussolini founded Societa Calcio Spalato, and renamed the club's home ground after his son. After the capitulation of Italy in 1943, the Partisans temporarily liberated Split and disarmed the Italian garrison, but the German Army quickly re-occupied the city and granted it to the Independent State of Croatia (NDH) they had installed in Zagreb in 1941. The attitude of the club did not change when the NDH authorities attempted to include Hajduk in the Independent State of Croatia Cup, as NDH earned resentment in Split for allying and partitioning them to Italy. With the Allies invading southern Italy and controlling the Mediterranean, the Adriatic islands became a haven for the resistance, prompting Hajduk's rebirth on one of them in 1944.

The club's players then joined the Partisan general headquarters on the island of Vis in the Adriatic. On 7 May 1944, on the Feast of Saint Domnius, the patron saint of Split, in the presence of Partisan leader Josip Broz Tito's and British officers (one of them being Randolph Churchill) Hajduk was formed again and began playing as the official football team of the Yugoslav resistance. They competed with Allied service football teams from across the Adriatic in Italy, where they famously played the British Army in a friendly match in Bari on 23 September, in front at least 40,000 spectators, losing 2–9. The match is considered to be one of the most attended football games during the war years, with a rematch in liberated Split few years after (Hajduk won 1–0). At this time, the club leadership adopted the Partisans' red star as the badge on the white-and-blue club dress.

In 1945, Hajduk embarked on a tourney through Egypt, Palestine, Lebanon, Syria and Malta. Traveling roughly 30,000 kilometers, and playing over 90 matches, the club won 74 of them. Allied airplanes dropped fliers all over Europe prompting other football clubs to follow Hajduk's example. While in Beirut, Charles de Gaulle gave Hajduk the title of honorary team of Free France, the trophy being treasured ever since.

With its proficiency and its "unique Dalmatian spirit", the club reportedly impressed Tito, who frequently attended matches. After the war, he invited Hajduk to move to the Yugoslav capital Belgrade and become the official Yugoslav People's Army (JNA) team, but the club refused, wanting to continue to play in their hometown of Split. One of their biggest future rivals, FK Partizan, were founded instead. However, Hajduk continued to enjoy the reputation of "Tito's favorite" long after the war, and it was because of the friendly relationship with the resistance, it became one of the few Yugoslav football clubs (and the only prominent one) not to be disbanded after the war by the communist government (as was the case with a number of other clubs, especially prominent ones such as BSK, Građanski, Jugoslavija, Concordia, HAŠK and Slavija).

=== Iconic 1950s ===
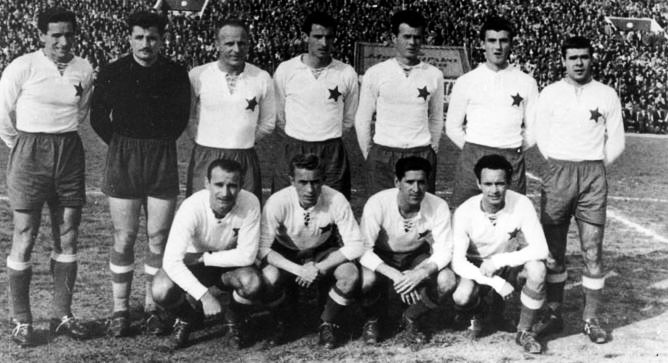
Hajduk's squad in 1955, wearing the red star badge

After World War II, Hajduk continued to play in the Yugoslav championship and its cup. In 1946, they won Croatian championship and established the magazine Journal of Hajduk. In 1948–49, Hajduk visited Australia and became the first team from Yugoslavia to play on all continents. The club won the 1950 Yugoslav championship without a single loss, setting a record that no one managed to accomplish before the breakup of Yugoslavia 40 years later. On 28 October 1950, a day before a decisive match against one of its biggest rivals Red Star Belgrade (a 2–1 win), the official fan organization Torcida was founded. It was created by engineering student Vjenceslav Žuvela, who named it after the enthusiastic Brazilian fans, and Torcida become the first organized group of supporters in Europe. The following year, reconstruction of "Stari Plac" stadium was finished, and it homed the club for more than three decades.

Consequent seasons showed Hajduk's supremacy, but also the political manipulations to prevent them winning the championships. For one, Torcida was viewed as a hostile organization by the communist authorities, which posed a risk to the national consciousness of the new Yugoslavian state. Hajduk's leadership was sanctioned, the team's captain expelled from the communist party, and Vjenceslav Žuvela imprisoned. Also, during the winter break of the 1952–53 season, following an invitation from Juan Perón, Hajduk went on tour to South America and eventually extended their stay there. This caused them to come home late, but instead of promised delay of games in the Championship, they faced defeat against BSK and a draw with Spartak Subotica as their youth team and couple of veteran players had to play them. Although Hajduk later beat both Red Star (4–1) and Partizan (4–2) in Belgrade, Red Star became the champion by only a two-point margin.

Next season saw a similar occurrence, with players Vladimir Beara and Bernard Vukas arriving late for national team training and receiving a month-long ban from football. Without these essential players, Hajduk lost important matches and Dinamo Zagreb finished as champions. All this prompted club legend Frane Matošić to storm a meeting of the Yugoslav Football Association and say, "Have you at least a gram of integrity?" On 3 April 1955 in Zagreb, Hajduk defeated Dinamo 6–0, recording its biggest win in the derby between the two largest Croatian clubs, and later won the championship. However, the Football Association of Yugoslavia qualified them to the European Mitropa Cup, while Partizan was chosen to participate in the inaugural European Cup.

During the early 1950s, the club had one of its most iconic generation of players, winning three Yugoslav championships. Two such players – goalkeeper Vladimir Beara and Zagreb-born midfielder Bernard Vukas (called "Bajdo") – were called to represent Team Europe in friendly matches against Great Britain. In one of the matches, Vukas scored a hat-trick. Apart from them, Frane Matošić scored his 729 goals in 739 official and unofficial games, setting a club record likely never to be broken. Other famous players included Božo Broketa, Ljubomir Kokeza, Slavko Luštica and Lenko Grčić.

=== Miserable 1960s and another Golden Generation ===
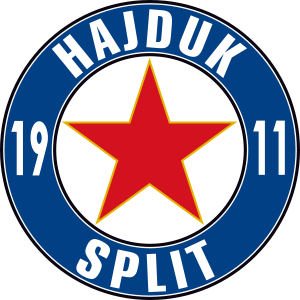
Hajduk's red star logo from 1960 to 1990

Generation of 1950s broke down after 1955 title, with Matošić retiring, Beara moving to Red Star Belgrade and Vukas to Italian club Bologna. The 1960s were remembered as some of the hardest times in Hajduk's history. In four seasons (1963 to 1966), the club finished no better than tenth and no better than fourth in the next half of the decade. In the 1965–66 season, due to the "Planinić affair" accusing Hajduk of rigging matches during those unsuccessful seasons, five points were deducted (down from the initial penalty of relegation), and Hajduk managed to stay in the top flight with much thanks to Petar Nadoveza, who managed to become the league's top scorer with 21 goals. During this era, the club won just one trophy – the 1967 cup, which was also their first Yugoslav cup trophy and send the team to European Cup Winners' Cup the next year, their first appearance under UEFA-organized international competition. Prominent players of the time included Ante Žanetić (member of 1960 World Soccer Team of the Year), Ivica Hlevnjak, Vinko Cuzzi and Andrija Anković.

From 1970 to 1980, Hajduk had achieved its most successful years in Yugoslavia. The new "Golden Generation" won five consecutive cups and four championships in the period from 1972 to 1979, accompanied by notable international success. In 1971, and after a 16-year wait, Hajduk won the title after a memorable 4–3 away win over Partizan in a decisive match Hajduk were at one time behind 0–3. This unexpected success was achieved with a team of youngsters, and Nadoveza as a league top scorer yet another time. After winning their first out of five consecutive domestic cups in 1972, the team achieved first major international success, playing in the semi-finals of next year's Cup Winners' Cup against Leeds United. The team's manager at the time was one of Croatia's finest, Branko Zebec.

After Zebec left the club, he was replaced by the young and talented Tomislav Ivić, who would later become the club's coaching legend and one of the most successful managers in Europe, winning eight league titles in seven different countries. The first three years under Ivić saw Hajduk win two Yugoslav titles and three cups. In 1976, Hajduk could have won a third-straight Double after defeating the top league team Partizan 6–1 away. However, there was a scandal in the last match of the season when Partizan defeated Olimpija after scoring in the 95th minute of the match (despite UEFA not yet introducing added time for another 20 years) after numerous dubious referee decisions during the match. With the season finishing, Ivić left Hajduk for Ajax, but would return two years later only to win another league title, the club's last in the former Yugoslavia.

During these years, Hajduk reached quarter-finals of both the European Cup and Cup Winners' Cup, with notable home wins against PSV (2–0), Arsenal (2–1) and Saint Etienne (4–1). Notable Hajduk and Yugoslav international players included goalkeepers Ivan Katalinić and Radomir Vukčević; defenders Ivan Buljan (1975 Yugoslav Footballer of the Year), Zoran Vujović, Dragan Holcer, Vilson Džoni, Luka Peruzović and Vedran Rožić; midfielders Jurica Jerković, Dražen Mužinić (1975 Yugoslav Footballer of the Year), Branko Oblak (1974 Ballon d'Or candidate); and strikers Ivica Šurjak (1976 Yugoslav Footballer of the Year) and Slaviša Žungul. The club's respected president at the time was Tito Kirigin.

=== Poljud case ===
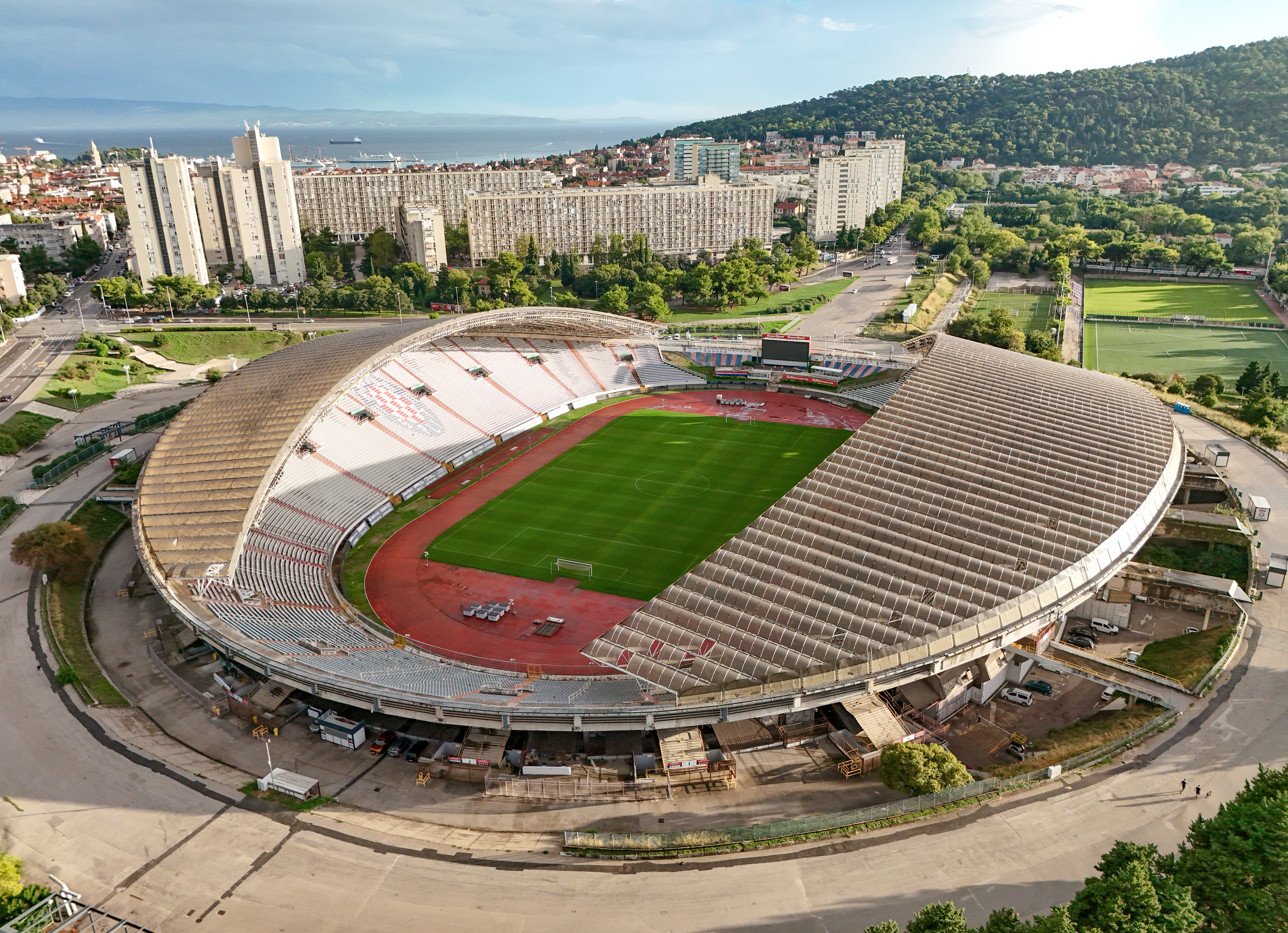
Poljud Stadium

In 1979, Hajduk moved to the newly designed stadium at Poljud, built to host the 1979 Mediterranean Games. However, the 1980s were noticeably less successful, as the club won only three Yugoslav cups before SFR Yugoslavia fell apart in 1991. The club's struggles were often linked to their new home stadium, which had athletic running track around the pitch, as opposed to Stari Plac, where supporters could cheer much closer to their team. The club's Inaugural season at Poljud saw Hajduk's most iconic official international match: the 1979–80 European Cup quarter-finals against eventual finalists Hamburger SV, and a 3–2 home win after losing 0–1 away. Later years saw Hajduk achieve memorable home wins against Valencia (4–1), Bordeaux (4–1), Marseille (2–0), Universitatea Craiova (1–0), Tottenham Hotspur (2–1) and a friendly win against Manchester United (6–0), considered to be United's biggest loss outside England. Hajduk also eliminated clubs such as Metz (5–1, 2–2), VfB Stuttgart (3–1, 2–2), Torino (3–1, 1–1), Dnipro Dnipropetrovsk (2–0, 1–0), Universitatea Craiova (0–1, 1–0, 3–1pen) and Sparta Prague (2–0, 0–1), reaching UEFA Cup semi-final in 1984 and quarter-final in 1986. In 1988, during a Cup Winners' Cup home match with Marseille, releasing tear gas from the crowd caused the game to be canceled at 2–0 for Hajduk to award Marseille a default 0–3 victory; Hajduk was also banned from all UEFA competitions for the next two years.

Apart from international success, domestic results were not as impressive. Although Hajduk spent the entire decade near the top of the league table, competing with Dinamo Zagreb, Partizan and Red Star Belgrade to form what was known as the "Great Yugoslav Four", the club won no title before Croatia became independent. Prominent players of the time included goalkeepers Ivan Pudar and Zoran Simović (1983 Yugoslav Footballer of the Year); defenders Boro Primorac, Branko Miljuš and Jerko Tipurić; midfielders Blaž Slišković (1985 Yugoslav Footballer of the Year), Ivan Gudelj (1982 Yugoslav Footballer of the Year), Zoran Vulić, Aljoša Asanović, Stipe Andrijašević, Dragutin Čelić; and striker Zlatko Vujović (1981 Ballon d'Or candidate). By the end of the Yugoslav era, a young generation of future 1998 FIFA World Cup bronze medalists began playing for the club. These included Igor Štimac, Robert Jarni, Alen Bokšić, Nikola Jerkan and Slaven Bilić.

In the wake of national tensions which would eventually lead to Yugoslav Wars, during a tour in Australia, Hajduk restored its traditional emblem with the Croatian checkerboard, omitting the red star and sparking a massive crowd celebrations upon return. In September of that same year, a home match against Partizan would be cancelled in the 73rd minute due to the crowd entering the pitch and burning the Yugoslav flag. Later, on 8 May 1991, Hajduk won the last held Yugoslav Cup final, defeating that year's European champions Red Star in Belgrade with a goal scored by Bokšić. Tito's trophy for Yugoslav Cup winners was therefore awarded to Hajduk to stay in the club's permanent possession.

=== Champions League and financial breakdown ===
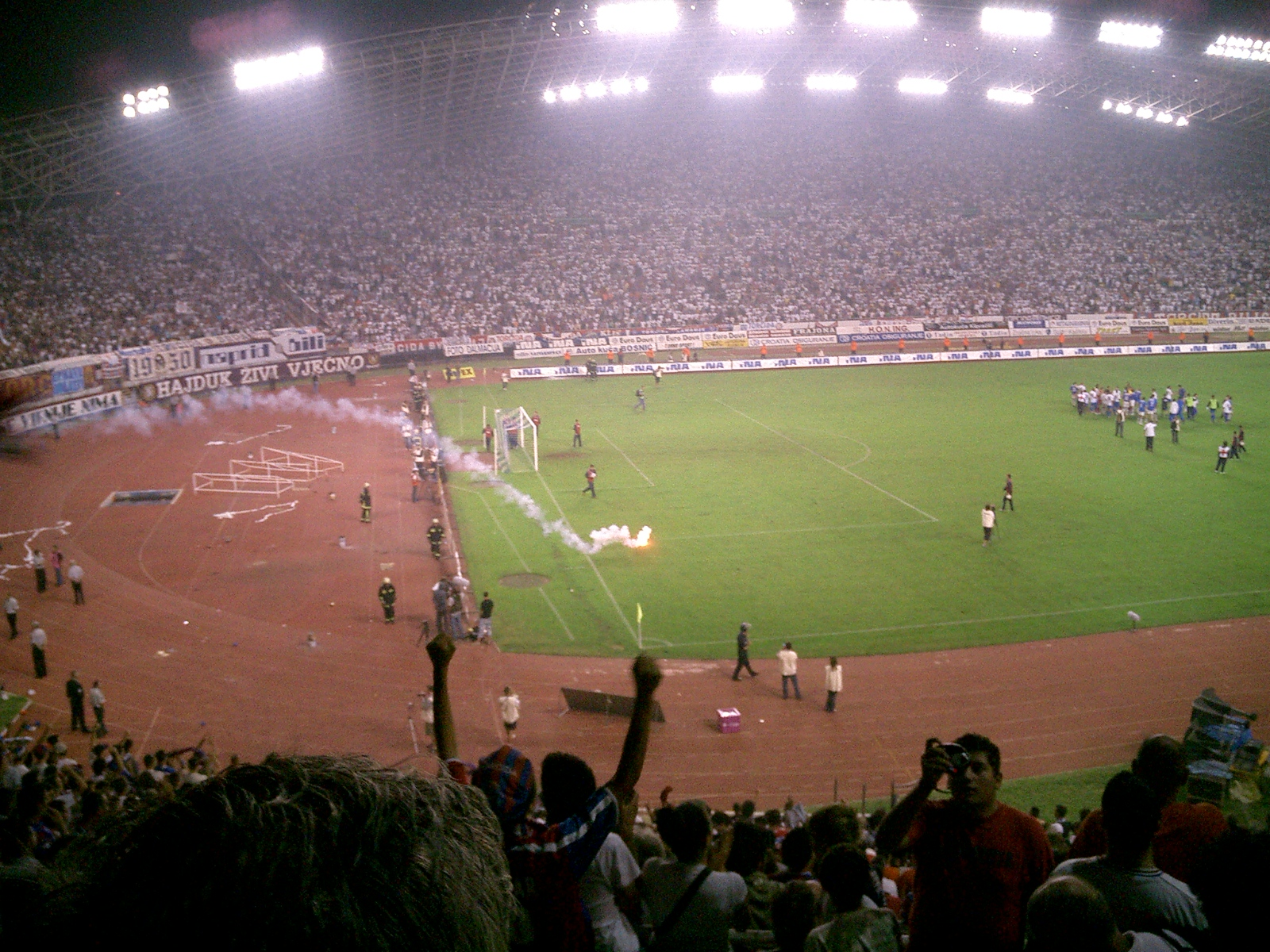
A Hajduk vs Dinamo match in Split

In the first four years of the HNL (the Croatian football league), Hajduk became far more successful than rivals Dinamo Zagreb, winning three league titles, two domestic cups and two supercups, with the 1994–95 season still standing as the most successful since playing in independent Croatia. Hajduk entered that year's UEFA Champions League with a mix of young upcoming stars Milan Rapaić, Ivica Mornar, Tomislav Erceg, Goran Vučević and experienced players such as Igor Štimac, Zoran Vulić, Aljoša Asanović and Tonči Gabrić returning to assist them. After entering the group stage, Hajduk finished second behind Benfica, ahead of Steaua București and Anderlecht, before losing in the quarter-finals to eventual champions Ajax (0–0, 0–3). Domestically, the club won its first and (as of yet) last double crown. However, even though the team was performing well, the club was financially poorly managed, accumulating a massive financial loss that led to blocking of club's account.

For the next five years, Hajduk stood in the shadow of wealthier and politically privileged rivals Dinamo Zagreb, and the Champions League was no longer realistically within reach. Between 1995 and 2000, the club won zero trophies. After continuous domestic and European failures, Hajduk fans began to seek the dismissal of administration officials and circulated the story about the possible privatization of the club, which at that time did not happen. While arch-rivals Dinamo (then called "Croatia Zagreb") won titles, Hajduk had problems with the registration of players for the league. Dissatisfaction among the fans grew so much that some broke into the club premises, causing a change in leadership and promises of new beginnings. After the death of the first Croatian president Franjo Tuđman, whom many saw as heavily preferring and financing Croatia Zagreb, 2001 saw Hajduk become champions once more after a memorable 4–2 win against Varteks in Varaždin, a match attended by far more Hajduk fans than locals. Unfortunately, financial conditions in the club were still dire, and the club was often on the precipice of bankruptcy and collapse.

Yet, even if operating with a blocked account, chairman Branko Grgić boosted with promises of attractive signings and trophies. Although Hajduk did manage to win the Cup in 2003 and league titles in 2004 and 2005, as well as sign Dinamo's promising young captain Niko Kranjčar and their legendary manager Miroslav Blažević, when finances and politically driven leadership finally broke down, so did the club's results. Hajduk spent rest of the decade finishing behind its rival, with numerous coaching and management changes and reorganizations, players of dubious quality and mediocre international performances, worst of which came after being eliminated by Shelbourne and 0–5 home loss to Debrecen. The election of new chairman Mate Peroš in June 2008, upon which he changed the entire professional staff and reorganized the administration, brought only temporary relief. Hajduk achieved first away win against Dinamo after five-and-a-half years (2–0), but again finished behind their arch-rivals, and reached the Croatian Cup finals only to lose to Dinamo once again in a two-game thriller which saw two 3–0 wins by both teams, before Dinamo won 4–3 in penalty shootout. More importantly, the club's finances did not radically change until next season, when Hajduk became joint stock company owned by the City of Split. Even if financially secure, newly appointed chairman Joško Svaguša continued the policy of expensive signings and unsustainable expenses to regain the club's former glory. In 2010, Hajduk won the Croatian Cup, its first trophy in five years, and later managed to qualify for the group stage of 2010–11 UEFA Europa League which was the first time since 1994 club secured a place in the group stages of UEFA competitions. Home wins against Dinamo București (3–0), Unirea Urziceni (4–1) and Anderlecht (1–0) were, however, just a temporary reminiscence of former successes.

Notable players of 1990s and 2000s include goalkeepers Stipe Pletikosa, Danijel Subašić and Tonči Gabrić; defenders Igor Štimac, Igor Tudor and Darijo Srna; midfielders Milan Rapaić, Nenad Pralija, Dean Računica, Niko Kranjčar, Josip Skoko, Ivan Leko, Srđan Andrić and Senijad Ibričić; and strikers Ardian Kozniku, Nikola Kalinić and Tomislav Erceg.

On 13 February 2011, Hajduk commemorated its 100th anniversary with a massive celebration in Split and all of Croatia, with both Hajduk players and fans honouring the club. The entire city was decorated with Hajduk banners, flags, posters and paraphernalia, and there was a spectacular firework show over Split. Hajduk played a friendly game with Slavia Prague to honour Hajduk's Czech origins, losing 0–2.

=== Naš Hajduk ===
All this time supporters led by Torcida led a struggle to end what they considered to be politically driven management of the club, and install experts to save Hajduk. In 2009, they started an initiative called "Dite puka" (People's Child) that should have prompted fans to buy up the club's shares and gain control of the club, which at the time didn't happen. However, in July 2011, inspired by examples in Germany and Sweden and organized under the association "Naš Hajduk" (Our Hajduk), fans managed to gain rights of organizing elections for members of the club's supervisory board, making Hajduk the only fan-owned football club in the Croatian First League, and one of only two in former Yugoslavia (the other being nearby HNK Trogir).

In 2012, the club fell into yet more financial trouble caused by former Hajduk presidents, leaving it with more than 100 million kunas in debt, and one town meeting away from being bankrupt. After forming lines in front of the City Hall on 15 October 2012, fans convinced the town leaders to sign a loan insurance to the newly elected chairman Marin Brbić and start the club's long needed financial recovery. Since then, according to the club's annual financial report, Hajduk is under continuous financial and managerial recovery. On 1 April 2015, Brbić was sacked by the club's supervisory board and on 18 May replaced by Ivan Kos.

Notable successes include a 2–0 away win over Internazionale and winning the 2012–13 Croatian Cup. By the end of 2016, the club had 43.339 members, more than any club in the region.

=== 2020s ===
Hajduk's poor European results continued, losing to Maltese side Gżira United in the first qualifying round of the 2019–20 UEFA Europa League and to Kazakh side FC Tobol in the second qualifying round of the 2021–22 UEFA Europa Conference League.

In February 2021, Hajduk signed Marko Livaja. In December 2021, Prva HNL captains voted Marko Livaja as the best footballer in the league, becoming the Hajduk player to win the best player award since 2003. Livaja finished the 2021–22 Prva HNL season as top goalscorer with 28 goals. This is a Hajduk record for a single season, beating Leo Lemešić's tally of 26 in 1934–35 and Zlatko Vujović with 25. Livaja was awarded the Prva HNL Player of the Year (Tportal) award for 2022. In doing so, he became the first player to win the award in consecutive years and first since Sammir in 2012 to be a repeat winner. For the 2022–23 season, Livaja was again the top goalscorer in the league with 19 goals, as Hajduk finished runners-up in the competition.

Hajduk won back to back Croatian Cups in 2021–22 and 2022–23.

In September 2023, Hajduk announced that it had achieved 100,000 members for the first time in the club's history.

On 3 April 2024, Hajduk lost 0–1 to Dinamo in the semi-final of the Croatian Cup at home, having lost by the same scoreline, at the same location, against the same opposition four days earlier. The results left Hajduk out of the cup and out of the title race, having led the league for 13 of the first 19 rounds. Crowd trouble after the game, including a pitch invasion and clashes with police, lead to some 50 arrests. The collapse of the title chase followed the high-profile January signings of Ivan Perišić, Josip Brekalo and László Kleinheisler. On 8 April 2024, club president Lukša Jakobušić departed Hajduk at the decision of the supervisory board. The same day, head coach Mislav Karoglan also left the club. Shortly after, sporting director Mindaugas Nikoličius resigned from his role, ending the Jakobušić-Nikoličius era at Hajduk.

On 25 April 2024, Ivan Bilić was announced as the new president of Hajduk Split. One of Bilić's first moves was to appoint recently retired Hajduk striker, and former Croatian international, Nikola Kalinić as the new sporting director in late May. Kalinić's appointed Gennaro Gattuso as head coach of the club in June 2024. As a player, Gattuso was a two-time UEFA Champions League winner with AC Milan and a World cup winner with Italy. Gattuso signed a two-year contract with Hajduk. Hajduk announced the superstar signing of Ivan Rakitić on 21 July 2024, while Ivan Perišić asked for a release from his contract. The season started with another European disappointment, going out in the UEFA Conference League 3rd qualifying round against MFK Ružomberok. Similarly to the previous season, a late season collapse where Hajduk went six games winless, saw it drop from 1st to 3rd place. Captain Marko Livaja was again the league top goalscorer and was given the Player of the Season award, Goal of the Season and named in the Team of the Year. Gennaro Gattuso left his role at the end of the season and was then named the Italy national football team head coach.

== Stadium ==
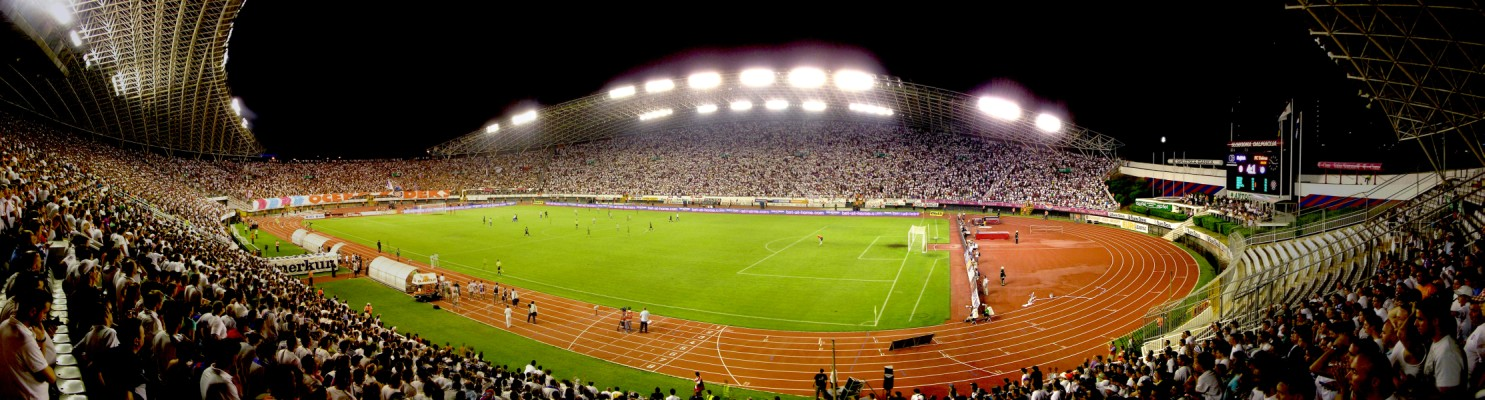
Panoramic view of the Stadion Poljud

Hajduk's home ground is one of the two largest stadiums in Croatia, designed by architect Boris Magaš, chosen among 20 other projects in a 1975 competition. The stadium was built for the 1979 Mediterranean Games, but was also a venue for the 1990 European Athletics Championships and the 2010 IAAF Continental Cup. The stadium is affectionately known to the locals as the Poljudska ljepotica ("Poljud Beauty"). The largest crowd recorded was in 1980 at a match against Hamburger SV – 52,000 spectators. Two years later, after the stadium was fully completed, its capacity was increased to 62,000 for a derby against Dinamo Zagreb.

From 1911 to 1979, Hajduk played on a stadium called Kod stare Plinare, used today by RK Nada rugby club. The stadium's first name was Krajeva njiva, but after club moved to Poljud, the old ground has become known in Split as the Stari Plac or Staro Hajdukovo ("Old Hajduk's Place"). During this time, the stadium hosted a match between Yugoslavia and the Netherlands in the UEFA Euro 1972 qualifying tournament. Hajduk supporters who would later reestablish the once forbidden name of Torcida, were situated in the east stands. 3,148 games were played on it, with 9,542 goals scored, 11 championships and six cups have been won.

== Crest and colours ==
=== Colours ===
Hajduk's original home colours

Hajduk played its first game in a strip with red and white vertical stripes, which symbolized the Croatian coat of arms. The former Austrian City Council did not want to be seen as partisan and would not allow club colors to be made up from the emergent Croatian tricolour. Hajduk changed its kit design to red and blue vertical stripes with white "Hajduk" written in the middle. 1914 saw the club choose a white shirt, blue shorts and socks; a combination that symbolizes white sails on a blue sea. The color white has since then become a symbol for the club, along with the nickname 'Bili' ('Whites').

Its away strip consists of red and blue shirts with vertical stripes (sometimes narrow, sometimes wide), blue shorts and socks, to symbolize the Croatian flag. From 2008 to 2011, the stripes were made horizontal. Although UEFA has not introduced compulsory registration of the third set of colours, one possibility was shirts of vertical red and white stripes, but were not adopted due to the resemblance of club colours of Red Star Belgrade. The third set of colours was therefore often a combination of first two (most often completely white outfit), until a new gray design, composed of small triangular fan flags, was introduced in 2015.

At one time the main colours were to be a combination of navy blue and white with blue horizontal stripes, but this kit was only sporadically worn by goalkeepers Stipe Pletikosa and Danijel Subašić.

=== Crest ===
Hajduk's crest consists of the Croatian checkerboard with 25 red and white checkers bordered by a circle of blue ribbon, with two white vertical lines on each side. The words Hajduk and Split are written above and below the checkerboard respectively. The symbolism of the white vertical lines is still under discussion, with theories such as being a symbol of the four founders, the equals sign or quotation marks.

The modern crest is almost identical to the one created in 1911. The original was designed by one of club's founders Vjekoslav Ivanišević. It was then taken to Ana, the sister of the Kaliterna brothers who took a drawing of the crest to a convent where nuns created 20–30 pieces by hand. The crest first appeared in public in 1926 during a performance of the Tijardović opera Kraljica baluna as part of the scenery.

However, Hajduk did not wear the original crest before World War II, as it was not obligatory at the time. After the club's rebirth following the end of WWII, the new crest became just a red star – a symbol of anti-fascism which Hajduk stood up for during the war. In 1960, a new crest was made, similar to the old one but with the red star in the middle instead of the former red and white traditional checkerboard. In 1990, while on tour in Australia, the original crest was returned and has been used ever since.

== Shirt sponsors and manufacturers ==
| Period | Kit manufacturer | Shirt sponsor |
|---|---|---|
| 1995–1996 | Diadora | Agrokor |
| 1996–1997 | Diadora | Kaltenberg |
| 1997–1999 | Diadora | Splitska banka |
| 2000–2002 | Umbro | Privredna banka Zagreb |
| 2002–2006 | Umbro | Agrokor |
| 2006–2010 | Umbro | INA |
| 2010 | Umbro | NTL |
| 2011 | Umbro | Konzum |
| 2012 | Umbro | Atlas d.d. (only 3 times) |
| 2013 | Umbro | Apfel (only Croatian Cup final) |
| 2013–2024 | Macron | Tommy |
| 2024– | Adidas | Tommy |

== Supporters ==
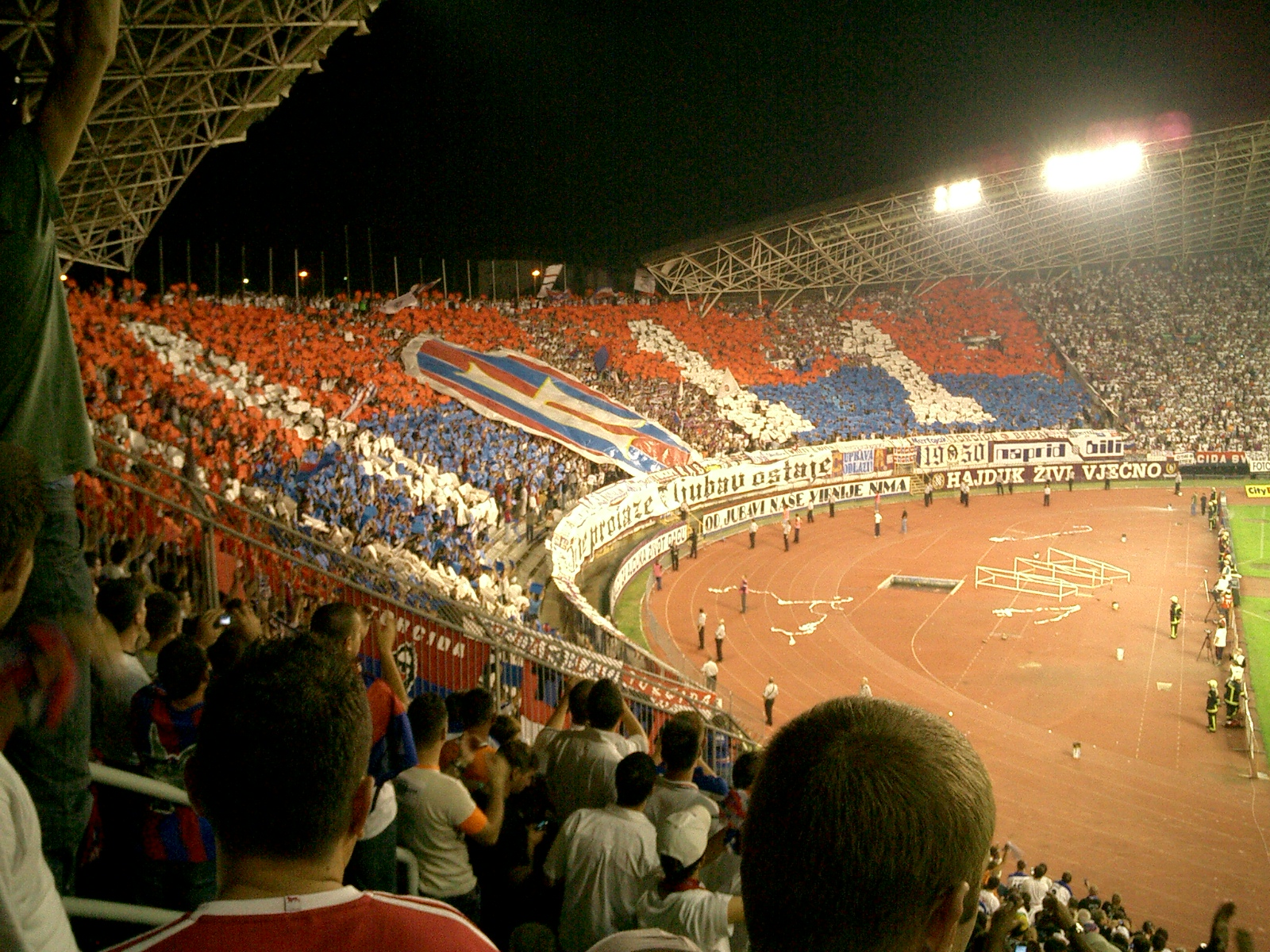
Torcida fans decorating the stands of Poljud Stadium during the Eternal Derby in 2006

Hajduk Split supporters, Torcida, were formed on 28 October 1950 by a group of students in Zagreb, namely Ante Dorić, Ante Ivanišević and Vjenceslav Žuvela, and are the oldest organized supporters group in Europe. They took their name from the Brazilian fan group they idolized, which comes from the Portuguese 'torcer' which means 'to cheer on'. "Hajduk lives forever" is their slogan. It is one of two fan-owned sports teams in Croatia, having over 43,000 members in 2016, and reaching 120,000 members in 2025. There are also over 50 Hajduk fan clubs situated mostly across Croatia and Germany, but as far as United States, Ireland and Australia.

Torcida members and other fervent fans gather in the north stand at the Poljud stadium, where they support their club.

The 'Heart of Hajduk' (Croatian: Hajdučko srce) is an annual football prize which was established in 1994. It is officially awarded by the Hajduk Split supporters' to the team's best performing player during the season. It is awarded during the annual futsal competition Torcida Cup.

In between clubs, Hajduk developed a kinship with SK Slavia Prague, SL Benfica, AS Saint-Etienne and Gornik Zabrze.

=== 2026 Ajax controversy ===
On 15 October 2026, as Hajduk Split hosted Dutch squad AFC Ajax as part of the UEFA Conference League, Torcida became involved in a major controversy after members of the fan club chanted pro–Nazi and antisemitic slogans in the Split city centre before the game. Some of the chants included "Trample, trample the Jews", "Auschwitz, Auschwitz", and "Rise, Adolf", referencing Adolf Hitler. Ajax, who lost the game 2–1, is noted as having a longstanding connection to the Jewish community in the Netherlands.

Before the match, Torcida members marched in a column led by a Volkswagen Golf Mk1 which was carrying a coffin on its roof with "Ajax" written on it. Volkswagen was founded by the German Labour Front, a Nazi-aligned organization, and has been used by various neo-Nazi movements.

The incidents were condemned by the mayor of Split, the Croatian government, and various Croatian political parties. A statement released by the Croatian government on X (formerly Twitter) said "such shameful behaviour represents a negation of sport and the democratic values that modern Croatia upholds." The President of Croatia, Zoran Milanović, said that "…measures and sanctions are necessary to demonstrate that there is no place in Croatia for the glorification of Nazism and the Ustaša ideology."

The far-right Homeland Movement political party criticized journalists for their coverage of the incidents, with party leader Ivan Penava accusing the media of conducting a "witch-hunt" against Torcida members. Images of 12 independent journalists were posted on the Torcida website in a format resembling "WANTED" posters, with the caption "Croatia has already seen all sorts of wonders, but it hasn't found enough rope for so many Judases." Prime Minister Andrej Plenković responded by confirming that "we always stand up for the journalists." At least 12 fans were arrested following the match in accordance with Article 325 of the Croatian Criminal Code.

The Israeli embassy in Croatia said it was "deeply shocked" by the events and "condemns them in the strongest way possible."

Hajduk Split published a formal apology after the match ended, in which they apologized to Ajax players and staff for having to witness these events, and acknowledging that the club could face a heavy punishment from UEFA.

== In popular culture ==
Hajduk Split features as the central theme of the television series Velo Misto (1980) and is one of the only football clubs to have a period drama filmed about its history.

== Rivalries ==
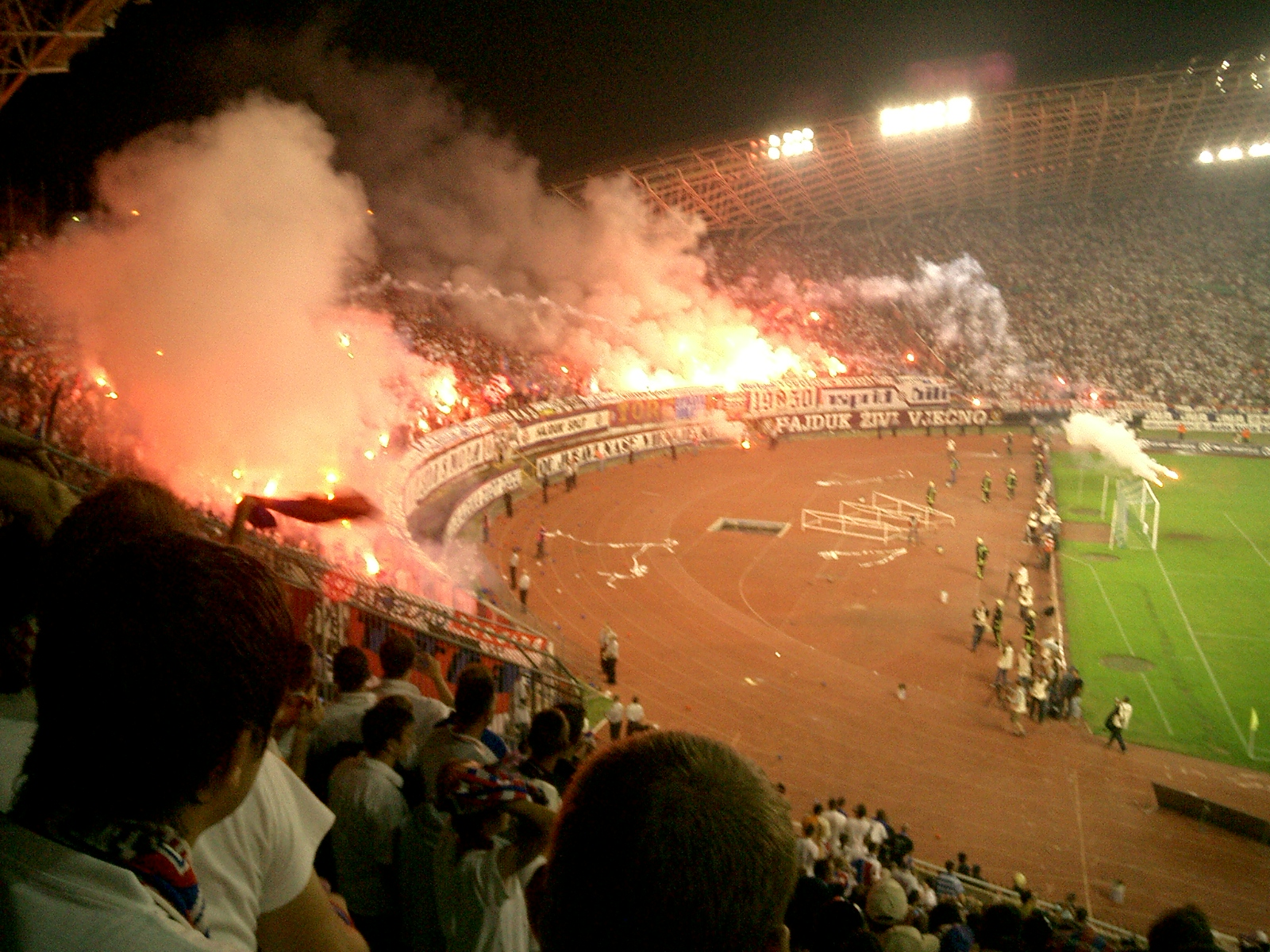
Fans set off flares at Poljud during the Eternal Derby match.

Hajduk's biggest rivals are Dinamo Zagreb, as the matches between the two teams are referred to as the "Eternal Derby". Former major rivalries used to include Serbian clubs Crvena Zvezda and Partizan who along with Hajduk Split and Dinamo Zagreb were part of the so-called Yugoslav Big Four. The matches against HNK Rijeka are called The Derby "Adriatic". Another match called a derby is against HNK Šibenik, called "The Dalmatian Derby".

== Players ==
Croatian teams are restricted to fielding at most six foreign players in the first eleven during the domestic league and cup matches. The squad list includes only the principal nationality of each player; players who also hold Croatian citizenship are specifically noted.

=== Current squad ===
As of 21 November 2026

Note: Flags indicate national team as defined under FIFA eligibility rules; some limited exceptions apply. Players may hold more than one non-FIFA nationality.

| No. | Pos. | Nation | Player |
|---|---|---|---|
| 1 | GK | CRO | Ivica Ivušić |
| 3 | DF | CRO | Roko Gabrić (also registered at Croatia Zmijavci) |
| 4 | MF | ALB | Adrion Pajaziti |
| 5 | DF | BEL | Alec Van Hoorenbeeck |
| 6 | DF | BIH | Dennis Hadžikadunić |
| 7 | FW | GAM | Abdoulie Sanyang |
| 8 | MF | FRA | Khalil Fayad |
| 9 | MF | BRA | Dalisson de Almeida (on loan from Córdoba) |
| 10 | FW | CRO | Marko Livaja (captain) |
| 11 | FW | CRO | Michele Šego (vice-captain) |
| 14 | DF | KOS | Ron Raçi |
| 15 | DF | AUT | Dario Marešić |
| 16 | MF | CRO | Anđelo Šutalo |
| 17 | DF | CRO | Dario Melnjak (vice-captain) |

| No. | Pos. | Nation | Player |
|---|---|---|---|
| 18 | MF | BEL | Leander Dendoncker |
| 19 | MF | ALB | Etnik Brruti |
| 20 | MF | ESP | Alberto del Moral |
| 22 | DF | MAD | Mathieu Acapandié |
| 23 | FW | CRO | Marin Šotiček (on loan from Basel) |
| 26 | MF | UKR | Adam Huram |
| 28 | MF | CRO | Roko Brajković |
| 32 | DF | CRO | Šimun Hrgović |
| 33 | GK | CRO | Toni Silić |
| 36 | DF | CRO | Marino Skelin |
| 38 | DF | CRO | Luka Hodak |
| 44 | GK | CRO | Dante Stipica |
| 77 | FW | ESP | Carlos Martín (on loan from Atlético Madrid) |
| 99 | GK | UKR | Davyd Fesyuk |

=== Players with multiple nationalities ===
- (Croatia) (Australia) Noa Skoko
- (Australia) (Croatia) Fran Karačić
- (Albania) (Kosovo) Adrion Pajaziti
- (Austria) (Croatia) Dario Marešić
- (Albania) (Kosovo) Etnik Brruti
- (Madagascar) (France) Mathieu Acapandié
- (Brazil) (Spain) Dalisson de Almeida
- (Bosnia and Herzegovina) (Sweden) Dennis Hadžikadunić
- (France) (Morocco) Khalil Fayad

=== Dual registration ===
Note: Flags indicate national team as defined under FIFA eligibility rules; some limited exceptions apply. Players may hold more than one non-FIFA nationality.

| No. | Pos. | Nation | Player |
|---|---|---|---|
| 3 | DF | CRO | Roko Gabrić (at Croatia Zmijavci) |
| 20 | DF | CRO | Duje Milišić (at Croatia Zmijavci) |
| 29 | DF | CRO | Mateo Čupić (at Uskok) |

| No. | Pos. | Nation | Player |
|---|---|---|---|
| 41 | FW | CRO | Dominik Babić (at Uskok) |
| 42 | FW | NGR | Peter Ugwuodo (at Croatia Zmijavci) |

=== Out on loan ===
Note: Flags indicate national team as defined under FIFA eligibility rules; some limited exceptions apply. Players may hold more than one non-FIFA nationality.

| No. | Pos. | Nation | Player |
|---|---|---|---|
| 13 | DF | CRO | Ivan Krstanović (at Široki Brijeg until 26 June 2027) |
| 29 | DF | AUS | Fran Karačić (at Lokomotiva until 30 June 2027) |

| No. | Pos. | Nation | Player |
|---|---|---|---|
| 37 | MF | CRO | Noa Skoko (at Rudeš until 30 June 2027) |
| 45 | MF | CRO | Mihael Žaper (at Radomlje until 30 June 2027) |

=== Retired numbers ===
Note: Flags indicate national team as defined under FIFA eligibility rules; some limited exceptions apply. Players may hold more than one non-FIFA nationality.

| No. | Pos. | Nation | Player |
|---|---|---|---|
| 12 | 12 | CRO | 12th man (reserved for the club supporters) |

== Technical staff ==
As of 8 July 2025

| Staff | Job title |
|---|---|
| (Poland) Robert Graf | Sporting director |
| (Spain) (Uruguay) Gonzalo García | Head coach |
| (Spain) Ibon Labaien | Assistant coach |
| (Croatia) Goran Roce | Assistant coach |
| (Croatia) Zvonimir Deranja | Assistant coach |
| (Croatia) Darko Franić | Goalkeeper coach |
| (Spain) Jose Carlos Garcia | Fitness coach |
| (Croatia) Antonio Plenča | Fitness coach |
| (Spain) Borja Zabala | Rehabilitation coach |
| (Croatia) Stjepan Badrov | Team manager |
| (Croatia) Danijel Franjković | Video analyst |
| (Croatia) Bruno Baćina | Video analyst |
| (Croatia) Miro Čolak | Kit manager |
| (Croatia) Zlatko Piteša | Kit manager |
| (Croatia) Ante Bandalović, dr.med. | Head of medical staff |
| (Croatia) Tomislav Barić, dr.med. | Doctor |
| (Croatia) doc.dr.sc. Vladimir Ivančev, dr.med. | Doctor |
| (Croatia) Boris Bećir, dr.med. | Doctor |
| (Croatia) Ante Turić, dr.med. | Doctor |
| (Croatia) Marko Kordić, dr.med. | Doctor |
| (Croatia) Marin Popović, dr.dent.med. | Dentist |
| (Croatia) Josip Gruica | Head of physiotherapy staff |
| (Croatia) Filip Brnas | Physiotherapist |
| (Croatia) Nikola Šarić | Physiotherapist |
| (Croatia) Ivan Gršković | Physiotherapist |
| (Croatia) Ivo Babić | Physiotherapist |
| (Croatia) Iva Tokić Sedlar | Nutritionist |

== Club statistics and records ==
Vedran Rožić holds the club's overall official games appearance record by playing in 390 matches over the course of 12 seasons from 1972 to 1984. Hajduk's all-time leading scorer in all competitions is Frane Matošić, scoring 211 official goals for the club, while Zlatko Vujović is all-time leading goalscorer in European competition with 19 goals.

Hajduk's record home attendance is 62,000 during a Yugoslav Championship match against Dinamo Zagreb on 28 February 1982. The record modern (all-seated) attendance is 38,000 for a match against Dinamo Zagreb on 22 February 2009.

Hajduk's first competitive game was a 9–0 victory against Calcio Spalato. 14–0 win over Slavija Sarajevo in 1934 was their largest league win during Yugoslav era. In Prva HNL club's largest league win was 10–0 against Radnik in 1994, while their biggest defeat was against Varteks in 2001, losing 1–5. Hajduk's biggest victory in European competitions was 8–0 against Gøtu Ítróttarfelag in 2002, while their heaviest defeat, 0–6, came against Ajax in 1993.

=== UEFA club coefficient ranking ===
| Rank | Team | Points |
|---|---|---|
| 162 | (Sweden) Häcken | 8.500 |
| 163 | (Malta) Hamrun Spartans | 8.500 |
| 164 | (Slovakia) Spartak Trnava | 8.500 |
| 165 | (Croatia) Hajduk Split | 8.500 |
| 166 | (Slovenia) Maribor | 8.500 |
| 167 | (Sweden) Elfsborg | 8.500 |
| 168 | (Poland) Wisła Kraków | 8.425 |

As of 5 July 2026

Source: UEFA.com

== Honours ==
Hajduk won two Kingdom of Yugoslavia championships, seven Yugoslav championships, six Croatian championships, nine Yugoslav Cup titles, eight Croatian Cup titles and five Croatian Super Cup titles. Abroad, the club has reached five European quarterfinals: three times in the European Cup (now UEFA Champions League), once in the UEFA Cup and once in the Cup Winners' Cup, as well as two European semi-finals: Cup Winners' Cup in 1973, UEFA Cup in 1984 and 2022–23 UEFA Youth League final.

=== Domestic (40) ===
Croatian football league system

- Croatian First League
  - Winner (6): 1992, 1993–94, 1994–95, 2000–01, 2003–04, 2004–05
- Croatian Cup
  - Winner (8): 1992–93, 1994–95, 1999–2000, 2002–03, 2009–10, 2012–13, 2021–22, 2022–23
- Croatian Super Cup
  - Winner (5): 1992, 1993, 1994, 2004, 2005
- Banovina of Croatia
  - Winner (1): 1940–41
- Socialist Republic of Croatia
  - Winner (2): 1945, 1946

Yugoslav football league system

- Yugoslav First League
  - Winner (9): 1927, 1929, 1950, 1952, 1954–55, 1970–71, 1973–74, 1974–75, 1978–79
- Yugoslav Cup
  - Winner (9): 1966–67, 1971–72, 1972–73, 1973–74, 1975–76, 1976–77, 1983–84, 1986–87, 1990–91

=== Doubles ===
- League and Cup: 1973–74, 1994–95
- League and Super Cup: 1992, 1994, 2004, 2005
- Cup and Super Cup: 1993

=== Best results in European competitions ===
| Season | Achievement | Notes |
European Cup / UEFA Champions League
| 1976 | Quarter-final | lost to (Netherlands) PSV 2–0 in Split, 0–3 in Eindhoven |
| 1980 | Quarter-final | lost to (West Germany) Hamburger SV 0–1 in Hamburg, 3–2 in Split |
| 1995 | Quarter-final | lost to (Netherlands) Ajax 0–0 in Split, 0–3 in Amsterdam |
UEFA Cup / Europa League
| 1984 | Semi-final | lost to (England) Tottenham Hotspur 2–1 in Split, 0–1 in London |
| 1986 | Quarter-final | lost to (Belgium) Waregem 1–0 in Split, 0–1 in Waregem (4–5 penalties) |
UEFA Cup Winners' Cup
| 1973 | Semi-final | lost to (England) Leeds United 0–1 in Leeds, 0–0 in Split |
| 1978 | Quarter-final | lost to Austria Wien 1–1 in Split, 1–1 in Vienna (0–3 penalties) |

Notable wins

| Season | Match | Score |
Champions League / European Cup
| 1974–75 | Hajduk – (France) Saint-Étienne | 4–1 |
| 1975–76 | Hajduk – (Netherlands) PSV | 2–0 |
| 1979–80 | Hajduk – (West Germany) HSV | 3–2 |
| 1994–95 | Hajduk – (Poland) Legia Warsaw | 4–0 |
| 1994–95 | Hajduk – (Belgium) Anderlecht | 2–1 |
| 1994–95 | Hajduk – (Romania) Steaua | 1–0 |
| 2001–02 | Hajduk – (Spain) Mallorca | 1–0 |
Cup Winners' Cup
| 1991–92 | Hajduk – (England) Tottenham Hotspur | 1–0 |
| 1993–94 | Hajduk – (Netherlands) Ajax | 1–0 |
Europa League / UEFA Cup
| 1978–79 | Hajduk – (Austria) Rapid Wien | 2–0 |
| 1978–79 | Hajduk – (England) Arsenal | 2–1 |
| 1981–82 | Hajduk – (West Germany) Stuttgart | 3–1 |
| 1981–82 | Hajduk – (Spain) Valencia | 4–1 |
| 1982–83 | Hajduk – (France) Bordeaux | 4–1 |
| 1983–84 | Hajduk – (Romania) Universitatea Craiova | 1–0 |
| 1983–84 | Hajduk – (Czechoslovakia) Sparta Prague | 2–0 |
| 1983–84 | Hajduk – (England) Tottenham Hotspur | 2–1 |
| 1985–86 | Hajduk – (Italy) Torino | 3–1 |
| 1985–86 | Hajduk – (Soviet Union) Dnipro Dnipropetrovsk | 2–0 |
| 2010–11 | Hajduk – (Belgium) Anderlecht | 1–0 |
| 2012–13 | Hajduk – (Italy) Internazionale | 2–0 |
UEFA Conference League
| 2026–27 | Hajduk – (Netherlands) Ajax | 2–1 |

== Presidents ==
HNK Hajduk Split presidents since 2000
| Name | From–to |
|---|---|
| (Croatia) Branko Grgić | 2000–2007 |
| (Croatia) Željko Jerkov | 2008 |
| (Croatia) Mate Peroš | 2008–2009 |
| (Croatia) Joško Svaguša | 2009–2010 |
| (Croatia) Josip Grbić | 2010–2011 |
| (Croatia) Hrvoje Maleš | 2011–2012 |
| (Croatia) Marin Brbić | 2012–2016 |
| (Croatia) Marijana Bošnjak (interim) | 2016 |
| (Croatia) Ivan Kos | 2016–2018 |
| (Croatia) (Kosovo) Jasmin Huljaj | 2018–2019 |
| (Croatia) Marin Brbić | 2019–2020 |
| (Croatia) Lukša Jakobušić | 2020–2024 |
| (Croatia) Marinka Akrap (interim) | 2024 |
| (Croatia) Ivan Bilić | 2024– |

== Awards ==
- May, 1945: Charter of honorable team of Free France, personally signed by Charles de Gaulle
- September, 1945: Order of Merits for the People with Silver Rays
- September, 1945: Order of Brotherhood and Unity with Golden Wreath
- 1980: "Youth Trophy" by Croatian Football Federation
- 1986: State Sports Award "Franjo Bučar"

== See also ==
- ŽNK Hajduk
- HNK Hajduk Split Reserves and Academy
