= 2026–27 FC Lugano season =

FC Lugano
2026–27 season
- Stadium: AIL Arena
- Swiss Super League: 3rd
- Swiss Cup: Pre-season
Home colours	Away colours	Third colours

The 2026–27 season is the 119th season in the history of Football Club Lugano and their 12th consecutive season in the Swiss Super League. The club will also compete in the Swiss Cup and the UEFA Conference League.

== Transfers ==
=== In ===
Pos.	Player	Transferred from	Fee	Date	Source
MF	(Honduras) Dereck Moncada	(Colombia) Internacional de Bogotá		1 July 2026	
GK	(Switzerland) David von Ballmoos	(Switzerland) Young Boys	Loan made permanent	1 July 2026	

== Pre-season and friendlies ==
27 June 2026 Friendly	Lugano (Switzerland)	2–1	(Switzerland) Neuchâtel Xamax
10:30	11' (pen.); 59' (pen.)		26'

4 July 2026 Friendly	Lugano (Switzerland)	1–1	(Switzerland) Rapperswil-Jona
10:30	Koutsias 72'		61'

7 July 2026 Friendly	Memmingen (Germany)	0–4	(Switzerland) Lugano
18:00			Bichsel 22'; Raffa 40'; Castro 56'; Bislimi 90'

10 July 2026 Friendly	Lugano (Switzerland)	1–0	(Germany) 1. FC Heidenheim
18:00

17 July 2026 Friendly	Lugano (Switzerland)	1–2	(Liechtenstein) FC Vaduz
20:15

== Competitions ==
=== Overall record ===
Competition	First match	Last match	Starting round	Record							
Competition	First match	Last match	Starting round	Pld	W	D	L	GF	GA	GD	Win %
Swiss Super League	26 July 2026		Matchday 1	3	3	0	0	11	2	+9	100.00
Swiss Cup				1	1	0	0	10	10	+0	100.00
UEFA Conference League	23 July 2026			4	3	1	0	10	3	+7	75.00
Total				8	7	1	0	31	15	+16	87.50

Last updated: 16 August 2026
Source: Competitions

=== Swiss Super League ===
==== Results by round ====
Round	1	2	3
Ground	H	A	H
Result	W	W	W
Position	3	2	1

Updated to match(es) played on 9 August 2026. Source:
A = Away; H = Home; W = Win; D = Draw; L = Loss

==== Matches ====
The match schedule was released on 16 June.

26 July 2026 1	Lugano	2–1	Vaduz	Lugano
16:30	Papadopoulos 29'; Mai 37'		Dalipi 71'	Stadium: AIL Arena; Referee: Alessandro Dudic

2 August 2026 2	Grasshopper	1–4	Lugano	Zurich
16:30	Plange 22'		Moncada 52'; Pihlström 78'; Cimignani 71', 90+2'	Stadium: Letzigrund; Referee: Marijan Drmic

9 August 2026 3	Lugano	5–0	Zürich	Lugano
14:00	Behrens 16', 34'; Steffen 52'; Dos Santos 79'; Moncada 89'			Stadium: AIL Arena; Referee: Lukas Fahndrich

=== Swiss Cup ===
16 August 2026 Round 1	Vedeggio	1–10	Lugano
16:00	Ahmari 55' (pen.)		Castro 8', 48', 67'; Dos Santos 9', 19', 46'; Moncada 12'; Kendouci 38'; Kelvin 86'; Pihlström 87'

=== UEFA Conference League ===
==== Second qualifying round ====
23 July 2026 First leg	Lugano (Switzerland)	1–0	(Kosovo) Dukagjini	Lugano
20:30	Steffen 31'	Report		Stadium: AIL Arena; Attendance: 5,917; Referee: Viktar Shymusik (Belarus)

29 July 2026 Second leg	Dukagjini (Kosovo)	1–5 (1–6 agg.)	(Switzerland) Lugano	Hajvalia
16:30	Maliqi 10'	Report	Behrens 6', 36', 58'; Dos Santos 9'; Sinani 51' (o.g.)	Stadium: Kampi Nacional Hajvalia; Attendance: 973; Referee: Karel Rouček (Czech Republic)

==== Third qualifying round ====
6 August 2026 First leg	Lugano (Switzerland)	2–0	(Faroe Islands) NSÍ Runavík	Lugano
20:30	Pihlström 7'; Behrens 79'	Report		Stadium: AIL Arena; Attendance: 3,328; Referee: Viktor Kopiyevskyi (Ukraine)

13 August 2026 Second leg	NSÍ Runavík (Faroe Islands)	2–2	(Switzerland) Lugano	Klaksvík
19:30	P. Knudsen 29'; Lindh 61'	Report	Cimignani 67'; Behrens 80'	Stadium: Við Djúpumýrar; Attendance: 697; Referee: Rob Hennessy (Republic of Ireland)

==== Play-off round ====
20 August 2026 First leg	Lugano (Switzerland)	2–1	(Israel) Maccabi Tel Aviv	Lugano
20:30	Behrens 30'; Grgić 54' (pen.)	Report	Shahar 47'	Stadium: AIL Arena; Attendance: 3,435; Referee: Miloš Milanović (Serbia)

27 August 2026 Second leg	Maccabi Tel Aviv (Israel)	1–1 (3–2 agg.)	(Switzerland) Lugano	Batumi
18:00	Peretz 69' (pen.); Camara (yellow card) 70'	Report	Papadopoulos (yellow card) 27'; Zanotti (yellow card) 36' (red card) 58'; Steffen (yellow card) 68'; Moncada 79'; Bislimi (yellow card) 90+2'	Stadium: Adjarabet Arena; Attendance: 816; Referee: Jérémie Pignard (France)
