= 2026–27 UEFA Conference League league phase =

International football club competition in Europe

The 2026–27 UEFA Conference League league phase began on 15 October 2026 and will end on 17 December 2026. A total of 36 teams are competing in the league phase to decide the 24 places in the knockout phase of the 2026–27 UEFA Conference League.

AGF, Egnatia, Iberia 1999, Inter Club d'Escaldes, Kauno Žalgiris, Mjällby AIF, Riga and Sint-Truiden are making their debut appearances in a major UEFA competition group stage or league phase. Inter Club d'Escaldes became the first team from Andorra to play in a major UEFA competition group or league phase.

A total of 30 national associations are being represented in the league phase.

== Format ==
=== Tiebreakers ===
Teams are ranked according to points (3 points for a win, 1 point for a draw, 0 points for a loss). If two or more teams are equal on points upon completion of the league phase, the following tiebreaking criteria will be applied, in the order given, to determine their rankings:

While the league phase is in progress, teams are ranked according to criteria 1–5 only, and if still tied, will be given equal ranking and sorted alphabetically. Criteria 6–10 will only be used after the final matches take place.

1. Goal difference;
2. Goals scored;
3. Away goals scored;
4. Wins;
5. Away wins;
6. Higher number of points obtained collectively by league phase opponents;
7. Superior collective goal difference of league phase opponents;
8. Higher number of goals scored collectively by league phase opponents;
9. Lower disciplinary points total (direct red card or expulsion for two yellow cards in one match = 3 points, yellow card = 1 point);
10. UEFA club coefficient.

== Teams and seeding ==
The 36 teams were divided into six pots of six teams each, with teams allocated to pots based on their 2026 UEFA club coefficients. The participants include:

- 24 winners of the play-off round (5 from the Champions Path, 19 from the Main Path)
- 12 losers of the Europa League play-off round

Key to colours
Teams ranked 1 to 8 advance to the round of 16 as a seeded team
Teams ranked 9 to 16 advance to the knockout phase play-offs as a seeded team
Teams ranked 17 to 24 advance to the knockout phase play-offs as an unseeded team

Pot 1
Team	Notes	Coeff.
(Italian Football Federation) Atalanta		84.000
(Portuguese Football Federation) Braga		63.750
(Royal Dutch Football Association) Ajax		58.250
(German Football Association) SC Freiburg		56.500
(French Football Federation) Monaco		56.000
(Danish Football Association) Copenhagen		54.375

Pot 4
Team	Notes	Coeff.
(Royal Belgian Football Association) Sint-Truiden		12.450
(Norwegian Football Federation) Brann		12.250
(Scottish Football Association) Heart of Midlothian		11.500
(Kazakhstan Football Federation) Kairat		11.000
(Turkish Football Federation) Trabzonspor		11.000
(Romanian Football Federation) Universitatea Craiova		10.500

Pot 2
Team	Notes	Coeff.
(Danish Football Association) Midtjylland		48.250
(Football Association of Serbia) Red Star Belgrade		46.500
(Royal Belgian Football Association) Gent		39.000
(Hellenic Football Federation) Panathinaikos		29.250
(Cyprus Football Association) Pafos		24.125
(The Football Association) Brighton & Hove Albion		23.903

Pot 5
Team	Notes	Coeff.
(Latvian Football Federation) Riga		10.500
(Croatian Football Federation) Hajduk Split		10.000
(Football Association of the Czech Republic) Jablonec		9.705
(Danish Football Association) Nordsjælland		8.421
(Danish Football Association) AGF		8.421
(Andorran Football Federation) Inter Club d'Escaldes		7.500

Pot 3
Team	Notes	Coeff.
(Swiss Football Association) Lugano		21.250
(Royal Spanish Football Federation) Getafe		19.409
(Football Association of Finland) KuPS		14.000
(Royal Dutch Football Association) Twente		13.585
(Gibraltar Football Association) Lincoln Red Imps		13.500
(Football Association of Bosnia and Herzegovina) Borac Banja Luka		13.125

Pot 6
Team	Notes	Coeff.
(Swiss Football Association) Thun		6.940
(Bulgarian Football Union) CSKA Sofia		6.500
(Lithuanian Football Federation) Kauno Žalgiris		6.000
(Swedish Football Association) Mjällby AIF		5.925
(Georgian Football Federation) Iberia 1999		5.000
(Albanian Football Federation) Egnatia		4.500

Notes

1. ^{ECL-CH} Winners of play-off round (Champions Path)
2. ^{ECL-MP} Winners of play-off round (Main Path)
3. ^{EL-PO} Losers of Europa League play-off round

== Draw ==
The draw for the league phase pairings was held at the Grimaldi Forum in Monaco on 28 August 2026, 13:00 CEST, along with the draw for the Europa League league phase.

The venue for each club's fixtures is shown in brackets below (H: home; A: away).

League phase opponents by club
Club	Pot 1 opponent		Pot 2 opponent		Pot 3 opponent		Pot 4 opponent		Pot 5 opponent		Pot 6 opponent		Avg coeff.
(Italy) Atalanta	Ajax	(A)	Pafos	(H)	Borac Banja Luka	(A)	Kairat	(H)	Riga	(A)	Mjällby AIF	(H)	20.5
(Portugal) Braga	Copenhagen	(A)	Gent	(H)	KuPS	(H)	Brann	(A)	AGF	(A)	Egnatia	(H)	22.1
(Netherlands) Ajax	Atalanta	(H)	Midtjylland	(A)	Getafe	(H)	Sint-Truiden	(A)	Hajduk Split	(A)	Thun	(H)	30.2
(Germany) SC Freiburg	Monaco	(A)	Panathinaikos	(H)	Twente	(H)	Trabzonspor	(A)	Jablonec	(H)	Kauno Žalgiris	(A)	20.9
(France) Monaco	SC Freiburg	(H)	Brighton & Hove Albion	(A)	Lincoln Red Imps	(H)	Heart of Midlothian	(A)	Nordsjælland	(H)	CSKA Sofia	(A)	20.1
(Denmark) Copenhagen	Braga	(H)	Red Star Belgrade	(A)	Lugano	(H)	Universitatea Craiova	(A)	Inter Club d'Escaldes	(A)	Iberia 1999	(H)	25.8
(Denmark) Midtjylland	Ajax	(H)	Pafos	(A)	Lincoln Red Imps	(A)	Sint-Truiden	(H)	Hajduk Split	(H)	Egnatia	(A)	20.5
(Serbia) Red Star Belgrade	Copenhagen	(H)	Gent	(A)	Lugano	(A)	Trabzonspor	(H)	Inter Club d'Escaldes	(H)	Iberia 1999	(A)	23.0
(Belgium) Gent	Braga	(A)	Red Star Belgrade	(H)	KuPS	(A)	Brann	(H)	AGF	(H)	Thun	(A)	25.3
(Greece) Panathinaikos	SC Freiburg	(A)	Brighton & Hove Albion	(H)	Borac Banja Luka	(H)	Kairat	(A)	Nordsjælland	(A)	CSKA Sofia	(H)	19.9
(Cyprus) Pafos	Atalanta	(A)	Midtjylland	(H)	Twente	(A)	Heart of Midlothian	(H)	Riga	(H)	Mjällby AIF	(A)	29.0
(England) Brighton & Hove Albion	Monaco	(H)	Panathinaikos	(A)	Getafe	(A)	Universitatea Craiova	(H)	Jablonec	(A)	Kauno Žalgiris	(H)	21.8
(Switzerland) Lugano	Copenhagen	(A)	Red Star Belgrade	(H)	Getafe	(A)	Sint-Truiden	(H)	Jablonec	(A)	Kauno Žalgiris	(H)	24.7
(Spain) Getafe	Ajax	(A)	Brighton & Hove Albion	(H)	Lugano	(H)	Universitatea Craiova	(A)	Inter Club d'Escaldes	(H)	Iberia 1999	(A)	21.1
(Finland) KuPS	Braga	(A)	Gent	(H)	Borac Banja Luka	(A)	Trabzonspor	(H)	Nordsjælland	(A)	CSKA Sofia	(H)	23.6
(Netherlands) Twente	SC Freiburg	(A)	Pafos	(H)	Lincoln Red Imps	(A)	Kairat	(H)	AGF	(A)	Thun	(H)	20.1
(Gibraltar) Lincoln Red Imps	Monaco	(A)	Midtjylland	(H)	Twente	(H)	Brann	(A)	Hajduk Split	(H)	Egnatia	(A)	24.1
(Bosnia and Herzegovina) Borac Banja Luka	Atalanta	(H)	Panathinaikos	(A)	KuPS	(H)	Heart of Midlothian	(A)	Riga	(H)	Mjällby AIF	(A)	25.9
(Belgium) Sint-Truiden	Ajax	(H)	Midtjylland	(A)	Lugano	(A)	Brann	(H)	Hajduk Split	(A)	Iberia 1999	(H)	25.8
(Norway) Brann	Braga	(H)	Gent	(A)	Lincoln Red Imps	(H)	Sint-Truiden	(A)	AGF	(H)	Kauno Žalgiris	(A)	23.9
(Scotland) Heart of Midlothian	Monaco	(H)	Pafos	(A)	Borac Banja Luka	(H)	Trabzonspor	(A)	Nordsjælland	(H)	Thun	(A)	19.9
(Kazakhstan) Kairat	Atalanta	(A)	Panathinaikos	(H)	Twente	(A)	Universitatea Craiova	(H)	Riga	(A)	Mjällby AIF	(H)	25.6
(Turkey) Trabzonspor	SC Freiburg	(H)	Red Star Belgrade	(A)	KuPS	(A)	Heart of Midlothian	(H)	Jablonec	(H)	CSKA Sofia	(A)	24.1
(Romania) Universitatea Craiova	Copenhagen	(H)	Brighton & Hove Albion	(A)	Getafe	(H)	Kairat	(A)	Inter Club d'Escaldes	(A)	Egnatia	(H)	20.1
(Latvia) Riga	Atalanta	(H)	Pafos	(A)	Borac Banja Luka	(A)	Kairat	(H)	Jablonec	(H)	Kauno Žalgiris	(A)	24.7
(Croatia) Hajduk Split	Ajax	(H)	Midtjylland	(A)	Lincoln Red Imps	(A)	Sint-Truiden	(H)	Nordsjælland	(H)	Thun	(A)	24.6
(Czech Republic) Jablonec	SC Freiburg	(A)	Brighton & Hove Albion	(H)	Lugano	(H)	Trabzonspor	(A)	Riga	(A)	Iberia 1999	(H)	21.4
(Denmark) Nordsjælland	Monaco	(A)	Panathinaikos	(H)	KuPS	(H)	Heart of Midlothian	(A)	Hajduk Split	(A)	CSKA Sofia	(H)	21.2
(Denmark) AGF	Braga	(H)	Gent	(A)	Twente	(H)	Brann	(A)	Inter Club d'Escaldes	(A)	Egnatia	(H)	23.4
(Andorra) Inter Club d'Escaldes	Copenhagen	(H)	Red Star Belgrade	(A)	Getafe	(A)	Universitatea Craiova	(H)	AGF	(H)	Mjällby AIF	(A)	24.2
(Switzerland) Thun	Ajax	(A)	Gent	(H)	Twente	(A)	Heart of Midlothian	(H)	Hajduk Split	(H)	CSKA Sofia	(A)	23.1
(Bulgaria) CSKA Sofia	Monaco	(H)	Panathinaikos	(A)	KuPS	(A)	Trabzonspor	(H)	Nordsjælland	(A)	Thun	(H)	20.9
(Lithuania) Kauno Žalgiris	SC Freiburg	(H)	Brighton & Hove Albion	(A)	Lugano	(A)	Brann	(H)	Riga	(H)	Egnatia	(A)	21.5
(Sweden) Mjällby AIF	Atalanta	(A)	Pafos	(H)	Borac Banja Luka	(H)	Kairat	(A)	Inter Club d'Escaldes	(H)	Iberia 1999	(A)	24.1
(Georgia (country)) Iberia 1999	Copenhagen	(A)	Red Star Belgrade	(H)	Getafe	(H)	Sint-Truiden	(A)	Jablonec	(A)	Mjällby AIF	(H)	24.7
(Albania) Egnatia	Braga	(A)	Midtjylland	(H)	Lincoln Red Imps	(H)	Universitatea Craiova	(A)	AGF	(A)	Kauno Žalgiris	(H)	25.1

== League phase table ==
Pos	Team	Pld	W	D	L	GF	GA	GD	Pts	Qualification
1	(Switzerland) Lugano	3	3	0	0	11	4	+7	9	Advance to round of 16 (seeded)
2	(Greece) Panathinaikos	3	3	0	0	9	3	+6	9	Advance to round of 16 (seeded)
3	(Netherlands) Twente	3	3	0	0	8	2	+6	9	Advance to round of 16 (seeded)
4	(France) Monaco	3	3	0	0	7	1	+6	9	Advance to round of 16 (seeded)
5	(England) Brighton & Hove Albion	3	2	1	0	5	0	+5	7	Advance to round of 16 (seeded)
6	(Norway) Brann	3	2	1	0	7	3	+4	7	Advance to round of 16 (seeded)
7	(Denmark) Copenhagen	3	2	1	0	7	3	+4	7	Advance to round of 16 (seeded)
8	(Romania) Universitatea Craiova	3	2	1	0	6	2	+4	7	Advance to round of 16 (seeded)
9	(Sweden) Mjällby AIF	3	2	1	0	5	1	+4	7	Advance to knockout phase play-offs (seeded)
10	(Belgium) Sint-Truiden	3	2	1	0	4	1	+3	7	Advance to knockout phase play-offs (seeded)
11	(Netherlands) Ajax	3	2	0	1	9	3	+6	6	Advance to knockout phase play-offs (seeded)
12	(Turkey) Trabzonspor	3	2	0	1	6	3	+3	6	Advance to knockout phase play-offs (seeded)
13	(Croatia) Hajduk Split	3	2	0	1	3	2	+1	6	Advance to knockout phase play-offs (seeded)
14	(Germany) SC Freiburg	3	2	0	1	4	5	−1	6	Advance to knockout phase play-offs (seeded)
15	(Serbia) Red Star Belgrade	3	1	1	1	6	6	0	4	Advance to knockout phase play-offs (seeded)
16	(Italy) Atalanta	3	1	1	1	4	4	0	4	Advance to knockout phase play-offs (seeded)
17	(Portugal) Braga	3	1	1	1	2	3	−1	4	Advance to knockout phase play-offs (unseeded)
18	(Belgium) Gent	3	1	1	1	1	2	−1	4	Advance to knockout phase play-offs (unseeded)
19	(Latvia) Riga	3	0	3	0	3	3	0	3	Advance to knockout phase play-offs (unseeded)
20	(Switzerland) Thun	3	1	0	2	3	3	0	3	Advance to knockout phase play-offs (unseeded)
21	(Bosnia and Herzegovina) Borac Banja Luka	3	1	0	2	3	4	−1	3	Advance to knockout phase play-offs (unseeded)
22	(Gibraltar) Lincoln Red Imps	3	1	0	2	3	6	−3	3	Advance to knockout phase play-offs (unseeded)
23	(Czech Republic) Jablonec	3	0	2	1	3	4	−1	2	Advance to knockout phase play-offs (unseeded)
24	(Denmark) AGF	3	0	2	1	1	2	−1	2	Advance to knockout phase play-offs (unseeded)
25	(Denmark) Nordsjælland	3	0	2	1	3	5	−2	2	
26	(Albania) Egnatia	3	0	2	1	2	4	−2	2	
27	(Kazakhstan) Kairat	3	0	2	1	3	7	−4	2	
28	(Bulgaria) CSKA Sofia	3	0	1	2	4	6	−2	1	
29	(Georgia (country)) Iberia 1999	3	0	1	2	2	5	−3	1	
30	(Cyprus) Pafos	3	0	1	2	3	7	−4	1	
31	(Spain) Getafe	3	0	1	2	3	7	−4	1	
32	(Scotland) Heart of Midlothian	3	0	1	2	2	6	−4	1	
33	(Finland) KuPS	3	0	1	2	2	6	−4	1	
34	(Denmark) Midtjylland	3	0	1	2	2	8	−6	1	
35	(Andorra) Inter Club d'Escaldes	3	0	0	3	2	7	−5	0	
36	(Lithuania) Kauno Žalgiris	3	0	0	3	1	11	−10	0	

Updated to match(es) played on 5 November 2026. Source: UEFA
Rules for classification: League phase tiebreakers

== Results summary ==
=== By matchday ===
Matchday 1
Home team	Score	Away team
Lugano (Switzerland)	3–2	(Serbia) Red Star Belgrade
Hajduk Split (Croatia)	2–1	(Netherlands) Ajax
Gent (Belgium)	1–0	(Denmark) AGF
Egnatia (Albania)	1–1	(Denmark) Midtjylland
KuPS (Finland)	2–4	(Turkey) Trabzonspor
Mjällby AIF (Sweden)	2–0	(Andorra) Inter Club d'Escaldes
Panathinaikos (Greece)	2–1	(Bosnia and Herzegovina) Borac Banja Luka
CSKA Sofia (Bulgaria)	1–2	(France) Monaco
Riga (Latvia)	1–1	(Kazakhstan) Kairat
Universitatea Craiova (Romania)	1–1	(Spain) Getafe
Atalanta (Italy)	3–1	(Cyprus) Pafos
Brighton & Hove Albion (England)	4–0	(Lithuania) Kauno Žalgiris
Copenhagen (Denmark)	3–0	(Portugal) Braga
Twente (Netherlands)	1–0	(Switzerland) Thun
Heart of Midlothian (Scotland)	1–1	(Denmark) Nordsjælland
Sint-Truiden (Belgium)	2–0	(Georgia (country)) Iberia 1999
SC Freiburg (Germany)	3–2	(Czech Republic) Jablonec
Brann (Norway)	2–1	(Gibraltar) Lincoln Red Imps

Matchday 2
Home team	Score	Away team
Kairat (Kazakhstan)	1–5	(Greece) Panathinaikos
Iberia 1999 (Georgia (country))	1–1	(Sweden) Mjällby AIF
Nordsjælland (Denmark)	2–2	(Bulgaria) CSKA Sofia
Red Star Belgrade (Serbia)	2–2	(Denmark) Copenhagen
Jablonec (Czech Republic)	0–0	(England) Brighton & Hove Albion
Kauno Žalgiris (Lithuania)	1–4	(Norway) Brann
Getafe (Spain)	2–5	(Switzerland) Lugano
Inter Club d'Escaldes (Andorra)	1–3	(Romania) Universitatea Craiova
Pafos (Cyprus)	1–1	(Latvia) Riga
Trabzonspor (Turkey)	2–0	(Scotland) Heart of Midlothian
Ajax (Netherlands)	2–0	(Italy) Atalanta
AGF (Denmark)	1–1	(Albania) Egnatia
Monaco (France)	3–0	(Germany) SC Freiburg
Midtjylland (Denmark)	0–1	(Belgium) Sint-Truiden
Thun (Switzerland)	0–1	(Croatia) Hajduk Split
Borac Banja Luka (Bosnia and Herzegovina)	2–0	(Finland) KuPS
Lincoln Red Imps (Gibraltar)	1–4	(Netherlands) Twente
Braga (Portugal)	2–0	(Belgium) Gent

Matchday 3
Home team	Score	Away team
AGF (Denmark)	0–0	(Portugal) Braga
Atalanta (Italy)	1–1	(Kazakhstan) Kairat
Midtjylland (Denmark)	1–6	(Netherlands) Ajax
Thun (Switzerland)	3–1	(Scotland) Heart of Midlothian
Red Star Belgrade (Serbia)	2–1	(Andorra) Inter Club d'Escaldes
KuPS (Finland)	0–0	(Belgium) Gent
Lincoln Red Imps (Gibraltar)	1–0	(Croatia) Hajduk Split
Mjällby AIF (Sweden)	2–0	(Bosnia and Herzegovina) Borac Banja Luka
Trabzonspor (Turkey)	0–1	(Germany) SC Freiburg
Monaco (France)	2–0	(Denmark) Nordsjælland
Copenhagen (Denmark)	2–1	(Georgia (country)) Iberia 1999
Lugano (Switzerland)	3–0	(Lithuania) Kauno Žalgiris
Twente (Netherlands)	3–1	(Cyprus) Pafos
Getafe (Spain)	0–1	(England) Brighton & Hove Albion
Sint-Truiden (Belgium)	1–1	(Norway) Brann
Panathinaikos (Greece)	2–1	(Bulgaria) CSKA Sofia
Riga (Latvia)	1–1	(Czech Republic) Jablonec
Universitatea Craiova (Romania)	2–0	(Albania) Egnatia

Matchday 4
Home team	Score	Away team
Kairat (Kazakhstan)	26 Nov	(Sweden) Mjällby AIF
Ajax (Netherlands)	26 Nov	(Switzerland) Thun
Brighton & Hove Albion (England)	26 Nov	(Romania) Universitatea Craiova
Iberia 1999 (Georgia (country))	26 Nov	(Spain) Getafe
Jablonec (Czech Republic)	26 Nov	(Switzerland) Lugano
Kauno Žalgiris (Lithuania)	26 Nov	(Latvia) Riga
Heart of Midlothian (Scotland)	26 Nov	(France) Monaco
Egnatia (Albania)	26 Nov	(Gibraltar) Lincoln Red Imps
Pafos (Cyprus)	26 Nov	(Denmark) Midtjylland
Brann (Norway)	26 Nov	(Denmark) AGF
Nordsjælland (Denmark)	26 Nov	(Greece) Panathinaikos
Borac Banja Luka (Bosnia and Herzegovina)	26 Nov	(Italy) Atalanta
Hajduk Split (Croatia)	26 Nov	(Belgium) Sint-Truiden
Inter Club d'Escaldes (Andorra)	26 Nov	(Denmark) Copenhagen
Gent (Belgium)	26 Nov	(Serbia) Red Star Belgrade
CSKA Sofia (Bulgaria)	26 Nov	(Turkey) Trabzonspor
Braga (Portugal)	26 Nov	(Finland) KuPS
SC Freiburg (Germany)	26 Nov	(Netherlands) Twente

Matchday 5
Home team	Score	Away team
Kairat (Kazakhstan)	10 Dec	(Romania) Universitatea Craiova
Copenhagen (Denmark)	10 Dec	(Switzerland) Lugano
Iberia 1999 (Georgia (country))	10 Dec	(Serbia) Red Star Belgrade
Getafe (Spain)	10 Dec	(Andorra) Inter Club d'Escaldes
KuPS (Finland)	10 Dec	(Bulgaria) CSKA Sofia
Lincoln Red Imps (Gibraltar)	10 Dec	(Denmark) Midtjylland
Riga (Latvia)	10 Dec	(Italy) Atalanta
SC Freiburg (Germany)	10 Dec	(Greece) Panathinaikos
Brann (Norway)	10 Dec	(Portugal) Braga
Trabzonspor (Turkey)	10 Dec	(Czech Republic) Jablonec
AGF (Denmark)	10 Dec	(Netherlands) Twente
Brighton & Hove Albion (England)	10 Dec	(France) Monaco
Thun (Switzerland)	10 Dec	(Belgium) Gent
Heart of Midlothian (Scotland)	10 Dec	(Bosnia and Herzegovina) Borac Banja Luka
Hajduk Split (Croatia)	10 Dec	(Denmark) Nordsjælland
Sint-Truiden (Belgium)	10 Dec	(Netherlands) Ajax
Egnatia (Albania)	10 Dec	(Lithuania) Kauno Žalgiris
Mjällby AIF (Sweden)	10 Dec	(Cyprus) Pafos

Matchday 6
Home team	Score	Away team
Ajax (Netherlands)	17 Dec	(Spain) Getafe
Monaco (France)	17 Dec	(Gibraltar) Lincoln Red Imps
Atalanta (Italy)	17 Dec	(Sweden) Mjällby AIF
Lugano (Switzerland)	17 Dec	(Belgium) Sint-Truiden
Midtjylland (Denmark)	17 Dec	(Croatia) Hajduk Split
Nordsjælland (Denmark)	17 Dec	(Finland) KuPS
Twente (Netherlands)	17 Dec	(Kazakhstan) Kairat
Borac Banja Luka (Bosnia and Herzegovina)	17 Dec	(Latvia) Riga
Red Star Belgrade (Serbia)	17 Dec	(Turkey) Trabzonspor
Jablonec (Czech Republic)	17 Dec	(Georgia (country)) Iberia 1999
Kauno Žalgiris (Lithuania)	17 Dec	(Germany) SC Freiburg
Inter Club d'Escaldes (Andorra)	17 Dec	(Denmark) AGF
Gent (Belgium)	17 Dec	(Norway) Brann
Pafos (Cyprus)	17 Dec	(Scotland) Heart of Midlothian
Panathinaikos (Greece)	17 Dec	(England) Brighton & Hove Albion
CSKA Sofia (Bulgaria)	17 Dec	(Switzerland) Thun
Braga (Portugal)	17 Dec	(Albania) Egnatia
Universitatea Craiova (Romania)	17 Dec	(Denmark) Copenhagen

=== By team ===
Results by Pot 1 team
Team	Matchday					
Team	1	2	3	4	5	6
(Italy) Atalanta	PAF (H)	AJX (A)	KAI (H)	BOR (A)	RIG (A)	MJA (H)
(Italy) Atalanta	3–1	0–2	1–1	26 Nov	10 Dec	17 Dec
(Portugal) Braga	COP (A)	GNT (H)	AGF (A)	KUPS (H)	SKB (A)	EGN (H)
(Portugal) Braga	0–3	2–0	0–0	26 Nov	10 Dec	17 Dec
(Netherlands) Ajax	HAJ (A)	ATA (H)	MID (A)	THU (H)	STR (A)	GET (H)
(Netherlands) Ajax	1–2	2–0	6–1	26 Nov	10 Dec	17 Dec
(Germany) SC Freiburg	JAB (H)	MON (A)	TRA (A)	TWE (H)	PAN (H)	KZG (A)
(Germany) SC Freiburg	3–2	0–3	1–0	26 Nov	10 Dec	17 Dec
(France) Monaco	CSO (A)	FRE (H)	NOR (H)	HEA (A)	BHA (A)	LRI (H)
(France) Monaco	2–1	3–0	2–0	26 Nov	10 Dec	17 Dec
(Denmark) Copenhagen	BRA (H)	CZV (A)	IBE (H)	ICE (A)	LUG (H)	UCR (A)
(Denmark) Copenhagen	3–0	2–2	2–1	26 Nov	10 Dec	17 Dec

Results by Pot 2 team
Team	Matchday					
Team	1	2	3	4	5	6
(Denmark) Midtjylland	EGN (A)	STR (H)	AJX (H)	PAF (A)	LRI (A)	HAJ (H)
(Denmark) Midtjylland	1–1	0–1	1–6	26 Nov	10 Dec	17 Dec
(Serbia) Red Star Belgrade	LUG (A)	COP (H)	ICE (H)	GNT (A)	IBE (A)	TRA (H)
(Serbia) Red Star Belgrade	2–3	2–2	2–1	26 Nov	10 Dec	17 Dec
(Belgium) Gent	AGF (H)	BRA (A)	KUPS (A)	CZV (H)	THU (A)	SKB (H)
(Belgium) Gent	1–0	0–2	0–0	26 Nov	10 Dec	17 Dec
(Greece) Panathinaikos	BOR (H)	KAI (A)	CSO (H)	NOR (A)	FRE (A)	BHA (H)
(Greece) Panathinaikos	2–1	5–1	2–1	26 Nov	10 Dec	17 Dec
(Cyprus) Pafos	ATA (A)	RIG (H)	TWE (A)	MID (H)	MJA (A)	HEA (H)
(Cyprus) Pafos	1–3	1–1	1–3	26 Nov	10 Dec	17 Dec
(England) Brighton & Hove Albion	KZG (H)	JAB (A)	GET (A)	UCR (H)	MON (H)	PAN (A)
(England) Brighton & Hove Albion	4–0	0–0	1–0	26 Nov	10 Dec	17 Dec

Results by Pot 3 team
Team	Matchday					
Team	1	2	3	4	5	6
(Switzerland) Lugano	CZV (H)	GET (A)	KZG (H)	JAB (A)	COP (A)	STR (H)
(Switzerland) Lugano	3–2	5–2	3–0	26 Nov	10 Dec	17 Dec
(Spain) Getafe	UCR (A)	LUG (H)	BHA (H)	IBE (A)	ICE (H)	AJX (A)
(Spain) Getafe	1–1	2–5	0–1	26 Nov	10 Dec	17 Dec
(Finland) KuPS	TRA (H)	BOR (A)	GNT (H)	BRA (A)	CSO (H)	NOR (A)
(Finland) KuPS	2–4	0–2	0–0	26 Nov	10 Dec	17 Dec
(Netherlands) Twente	THU (H)	LRI (A)	PAF (H)	FRE (A)	AGF (A)	KAI (H)
(Netherlands) Twente	1–0	4–1	3–1	26 Nov	10 Dec	17 Dec
(Gibraltar) Lincoln Red Imps	SKB (A)	TWE (H)	HAJ (H)	EGN (A)	MID (H)	MON (A)
(Gibraltar) Lincoln Red Imps	1–2	1–4	1–0	26 Nov	10 Dec	17 Dec
(Bosnia and Herzegovina) Borac Banja Luka	PAN (A)	KUPS (H)	MJA (A)	ATA (H)	HEA (A)	RIG (H)
(Bosnia and Herzegovina) Borac Banja Luka	1–2	2–0	0–2	26 Nov	10 Dec	17 Dec

Results by Pot 4 team
Team	Matchday					
Team	1	2	3	4	5	6
(Belgium) Sint-Truiden	IBE (H)	MID (A)	SKB (H)	HAJ (A)	AJX (H)	LUG (A)
(Belgium) Sint-Truiden	2–0	1–0	1–1	26 Nov	10 Dec	17 Dec
(Norway) Brann	LRI (H)	KZG (A)	STR (A)	AGF (H)	BRA (H)	GNT (A)
(Norway) Brann	2–1	4–1	1–1	26 Nov	10 Dec	17 Dec
(Scotland) Heart of Midlothian	NOR (H)	TRA (A)	THU (A)	MON (H)	BOR (H)	PAF (A)
(Scotland) Heart of Midlothian	1–1	0–2	1–3	26 Nov	10 Dec	17 Dec
(Kazakhstan) Kairat	RIG (A)	PAN (H)	ATA (A)	MJA (H)	UCR (H)	TWE (A)
(Kazakhstan) Kairat	1–1	1–5	1–1	26 Nov	10 Dec	17 Dec
(Turkey) Trabzonspor	KUPS (A)	HEA (H)	FRE (H)	CSO (A)	JAB (H)	CZV (A)
(Turkey) Trabzonspor	4–2	2–0	0–1	26 Nov	10 Dec	17 Dec
(Romania) Universitatea Craiova	GET (H)	ICE (A)	EGN (H)	BHA (A)	KAI (A)	COP (H)
(Romania) Universitatea Craiova	1–1	3–1	2–0	26 Nov	10 Dec	17 Dec

Results by Pot 5 team
Team	Matchday					
Team	1	2	3	4	5	6
(Latvia) Riga	KAI (H)	PAF (A)	JAB (H)	KZG (A)	ATA (H)	BOR (A)
(Latvia) Riga	1–1	1–1	1–1	26 Nov	10 Dec	17 Dec
(Croatia) Hajduk Split	AJX (H)	THU (A)	LRI (A)	STR (H)	NOR (H)	MID (A)
(Croatia) Hajduk Split	2–1	1–0	0–1	26 Nov	10 Dec	17 Dec
(Czech Republic) Jablonec	FRE (A)	BHA (H)	RIG (A)	LUG (H)	TRA (A)	IBE (H)
(Czech Republic) Jablonec	2–3	0–0	1–1	26 Nov	10 Dec	17 Dec
(Denmark) Nordsjælland	HEA (A)	CSO (H)	MON (A)	PAN (H)	HAJ (A)	KUPS (H)
(Denmark) Nordsjælland	1–1	2–2	0–2	26 Nov	10 Dec	17 Dec
(Denmark) AGF	GNT (A)	EGN (H)	BRA (H)	SKB (A)	TWE (H)	ICE (A)
(Denmark) AGF	0–1	1–1	0–0	26 Nov	10 Dec	17 Dec
(Andorra) Inter Club d'Escaldes	MJA (A)	UCR (H)	CZV (A)	COP (H)	GET (A)	AGF (H)
(Andorra) Inter Club d'Escaldes	0–2	1–3	1–2	26 Nov	10 Dec	17 Dec

Results by Pot 6 team
Team	Matchday					
Team	1	2	3	4	5	6
(Switzerland) Thun	TWE (A)	HAJ (H)	HEA (H)	AJX (A)	GNT (H)	CSO (A)
(Switzerland) Thun	0–1	0–1	3–1	26 Nov	10 Dec	17 Dec
(Bulgaria) CSKA Sofia	MON (H)	NOR (A)	PAN (A)	TRA (H)	KUPS (A)	THU (H)
(Bulgaria) CSKA Sofia	1–2	2–2	1–2	26 Nov	10 Dec	17 Dec
(Lithuania) Kauno Žalgiris	BHA (A)	SKB (H)	LUG (A)	RIG (H)	EGN (A)	FRE (H)
(Lithuania) Kauno Žalgiris	0–4	1–4	0–3	26 Nov	10 Dec	17 Dec
(Sweden) Mjällby AIF	ICE (H)	IBE (A)	BOR (H)	KAI (A)	PAF (H)	ATA (A)
(Sweden) Mjällby AIF	2–0	1–1	2–0	26 Nov	10 Dec	17 Dec
(Georgia (country)) Iberia 1999	STR (A)	MJA (H)	COP (A)	GET (H)	CZV (H)	JAB (A)
(Georgia (country)) Iberia 1999	0–2	1–1	1–2	26 Nov	10 Dec	17 Dec
(Albania) Egnatia	MID (H)	AGF (A)	UCR (A)	LRI (H)	KZG (H)	BRA (A)
(Albania) Egnatia	1–1	1–1	0–2	26 Nov	10 Dec	17 Dec

Updated to match(es) played on 5 November 2026. Source: UEFA
Scores and legend colours are listed from the perspective of the team in the "Team" column.
Legend: H = home, A = away. Green = win; Yellow = draw; Red = loss.

== Matches ==
The fixture list was announced on 29 August 2026, the day after the draw.

Times are CET or CEST, (Note: CEST (UTC+2) for dates up to 24 October 2026 (matchdays 1–2), and CET (UTC+1) for dates thereafter (matchdays 3–6).) as listed by UEFA (local times, if different, are in parentheses).

=== Matchday 1 ===
15 October 2026
18:45

Lugano (Switzerland)	3–2	(Serbia) Red Star Belgrade
Ajeti 25'; Moncada 84'; Grgić 90' (pen.)	Report	Elšnik 32'; Krunić 67'

AIL Arena, Lugano
Attendance: 7,898
Referee: Florian Badstübner (Germany)

15 October 2026
18:45

Hajduk Split (Croatia)	2–1	(Netherlands) Ajax
Sanyang 37'; Šotiček 55'	Report	Klaassen 53'

Stadion Poljud, Split
Attendance: 32,136
Referee: Christian-Petru Ciochirca (Austria)

15 October 2026
18:45

Gent (Belgium)	1–0	(Denmark) AGF
Goore 87'	Report

Planet Group Arena, Ghent
Attendance: 11,839
Referee: Bulat Sariyev (Kazakhstan)

15 October 2026
18:45

Egnatia (Albania)	1–1	(Denmark) Midtjylland
Gruda 26'	Report	Cho Gue-sung 33'

Elbasan Arena, Elbasan (Note: Egnatia will play their home matches at Arena Kombëtare, Tirana, instead of their regular stadium, Egnatia Arena, Rrogozhinë, which does not meet UEFA requirements.)
Attendance: 1,521
Referee: Stefan Ebner (Austria)

15 October 2026
18:45 (19:45 UTC+3)

KuPS (Finland)	2–4	(Turkey) Trabzonspor
Pennanen 54'; Engvall 90+6'	Report	Onuachu 3'; Salah 44'; Franculino 47', 90+1'

Tammelan Stadion, Tampere (Note: KuPS will play their home matches at Tammelan Stadion, Tampere, instead of their regular stadium, Kuopio Football Stadium, Kuopio, which does not meet UEFA requirements.)
Attendance: 7,812
Referee: Ishmael Barbara (Malta)

15 October 2026
18:45

Mjällby AIF (Sweden)	2–0	(Andorra) Inter Club d'Escaldes
Bergström 54'; Norén 65'	Report

Olympia, Helsingborg (Note: Mjällby AIF will play their home matches at Olympia, Helsingborg, instead of their regular stadium, Strandvallen, Hällevik, which does not meet UEFA requirements.)
Attendance: 2,691
Referee: Menelaos Antoniou (Cyprus)

15 October 2026
18:45 (19:45 UTC+3)

Panathinaikos (Greece)	2–1	(Bosnia and Herzegovina) Borac Banja Luka
Dessers 10' (pen.); Kangwa 70'	Report	Jojić 80'

Olympic Stadium, Athens
Attendance: 21,363
Referee: Bence Csonka (Hungary)

15 October 2026
18:45 (19:45 UTC+3)

CSKA Sofia (Bulgaria)	1–2	(France) Monaco
Zwarts 76'	Report	Brunner 3'; Fati 44'

Vasil Levski National Stadium, Sofia (Note: CSKA Sofia will play their home matches at Vasil Levski National Stadium, Sofia, instead of their regular stadium, Stadion Balgarska Armia, Sofia, due to renovation works.)
Attendance: 22,025
Referee: João Gonçalves (Portugal)

15 October 2026
18:45 (19:45 UTC+3)

Riga (Latvia)	1–1	(Kazakhstan) Kairat
Oulad M'Hand 12'	Report	Gual 5' (pen.)

Skonto Stadium, Riga
Attendance: 5,440
Referee: Florian Lata (Albania)

15 October 2026
18:45 (19:45 UTC+3)

Universitatea Craiova (Romania)	1–1	(Spain) Getafe
Al Hamlawi 59'	Report	Gudelj 81'

Ion Oblemenco Stadium, Craiova
Attendance: 26,732
Referee: David Šmajc (Slovenia)

15 October 2026
21:00

Atalanta (Italy)	3−1	(Cyprus) Pafos
Elmas 1'; Raspadori 18' (pen.); Scamacca 44'	Report	Biel 88'

Stadio di Bergamo, Bergamo
Attendance: 18,709
Referee: Adam Ladebäck (Sweden)

15 October 2026
21:00 (20:00 UTC+1)

Brighton & Hove Albion (England)	4−0	(Lithuania) Kauno Žalgiris
Rutter 41', 54'; Hinshelwood 45+2'; O'Riley 67'	Report

Falmer Stadium, Brighton and Hove
Attendance: 21,840
Referee: Mikkel Redder (Denmark)

15 October 2026
21:00

Copenhagen (Denmark)	3−0	(Portugal) Braga
Elyounoussi 49'; Cornelius 79', 86'	Report

Parken Stadium, Copenhagen
Attendance: 24,636
Referee: Joey Kooij (Netherlands)

15 October 2026
21:00

Twente (Netherlands)	1−0	(Switzerland) Thun
Zerrouki 65'	Report

De Grolsch Veste, Enschede
Attendance: 28,500
Referee: Genc Nuza (Kosovo)

15 October 2026
21:00 (20:00 UTC+1)

Heart of Midlothian (Scotland)	1−1	(Denmark) Nordsjælland
McEntee 33'	Report	Røjkjær 86'

Tynecastle Park, Edinburgh
Attendance: 17,368
Referee: Damian Kos (Poland)

15 October 2026
21:00

Sint-Truiden (Belgium)	2−0	(Georgia (country)) Iberia 1999
Vanwesemael 12'; Sebaoui 88'	Report

Stayen, Sint-Truiden
Attendance: 5,185
Referee: Mehmet Türkmen (Turkey)

15 October 2026
21:00

SC Freiburg (Germany)	3−2	(Czech Republic) Jablonec
Grifo 15'; Pavlović 53' (o.g.); Eggestein 65'	Report	Růsek 28'; Kuol 90+3'

Europa-Park Stadion, Freiburg im Breisgau
Attendance: 28,100
Referee: Edgars Maļcevs (Latvia)

15 October 2026
21:00

Brann (Norway)	2−1	(Gibraltar) Lincoln Red Imps
Castro 64', 81'	Report	Gómez 59'

Brann Stadion, Bergen
Attendance: 10,206
Referee: Dalibor Černý (Czech Republic)

=== Matchday 2 ===
22 October 2026
16:30 (19:30 UTC+5)

Kairat (Kazakhstan)	1–5	(Greece) Panathinaikos
Bekbolat 79'	Report	Taborda 6'; Dessers 24' (pen.), 47'; Kangwa 57'; Rastoder 75'

Central Stadium, Almaty
Attendance: 9,437
Referee: Allard Lindhout (Netherlands)

22 October 2026
18:45 (20:45 UTC+4)

Iberia 1999 (Georgia (country))	1–1	(Sweden) Mjällby AIF
Jinjolava 55' (pen.)	Report	Pettersson 89'

Mikheil Meskhi Stadium, Tbilisi
Attendance: 2,423
Referee: Lothar D'Hondt (Belgium)

22 October 2026
18:45

Nordsjælland (Denmark)	2–2	(Bulgaria) CSKA Sofia
Adel 55', 68'	Report	Godoy 8', 88'

Right to Dream Park, Farum
Attendance: 3,879
Referee: Robert Jones (England)

22 October 2026
18:45

Red Star Belgrade (Serbia)	2–2	(Denmark) Copenhagen
Elšnik 34'; Kostov 41'	Report	Gashtarov 29' (o.g.); Carrizo 70'

Red Star Stadium, Belgrade
Attendance: 16,234
Referee: Radu Petrescu (Romania)

22 October 2026
18:45

Jablonec (Czech Republic)	0–0	(England) Brighton & Hove Albion
	Report

Stadion Střelnice, Jablonec nad Nisou
Attendance: 6,114
Referee: Sigurd Kringstad (Norway)

22 October 2026
18:45 (19:45 UTC+3)

Kauno Žalgiris (Lithuania)	1–4	(Norway) Brann
Oliveira 11'	Report	Castro 7' (pen.); Holm 25', 40', 85'

Darius and Girėnas Stadium, Kaunas
Attendance: 4,383
Referee: Pavle Ilić (Serbia)

22 October 2026
18:45

Getafe (Spain)	2–5	(Switzerland) Lugano
Azón 2'; Mayoral 74'	Report	Ajeti 3', 26'; Cimignani 7'; Bislimi 50'; Behrens 90+2'

Coliseum, Getafe
Attendance: 6,365
Referee: Atilla Karaoğlan (Turkey)

22 October 2026
18:45

Inter Club d'Escaldes (Andorra)	1–3	(Romania) Universitatea Craiova
Arellano 78'	Report	Al Hamlawi 3'; Baiaram 5'; Elisor 86'

Estadi de la FAF, Encamp
Attendance: 1,022
Referee: Christos Vergetis (Greece)

22 October 2026
18:45 (19:45 UTC+3)

Pafos (Cyprus)	1–1	(Latvia) Riga
Biel 76'	Report	Caio 67'

Alphamega Stadium, Limassol (Note: Pafos will play their home matches at Alphamega Stadium, Limassol, instead of their regular stadium, Stelios Kyriakides Stadium, Paphos, which does not meet UEFA requirements.)
Attendance: 3,193
Referee: Marian Barbu (Romania)

22 October 2026
18:45 (19:45 UTC+3)

Trabzonspor (Turkey)	2–0	(Scotland) Heart of Midlothian
Salah 32' (pen.); Franculino 58'	Report

Şenol Güneş Sports Complex, Trabzon
Attendance: 28,096
Referee: Lawrence Visser (Belgium)

22 October 2026
21:00

Ajax (Netherlands)	2–0	(Italy) Atalanta
Arokodare 87'; Ouazane 90+3'	Report

Johan Cruyff Arena, Amsterdam
Attendance: 51,739
Referee: António Nobre (Portugal)

22 October 2026
21:00

AGF (Denmark)	1–1	(Albania) Egnatia
Bogere 49'	Report	Gruda 13'

Randers Stadium, Randers (Note: AGF will play their home matches at Randers Stadium, Randers, instead of their regular stadium, Aarhus Stadium, Aarhus, due to renovation works.)
Attendance: 6,738
Referee: Ante Čulina (Croatia)

22 October 2026
21:00

Monaco (France)	3–0	(Germany) SC Freiburg
Brunner 45+2'; Camara 83'; Fati 90+2'	Report

Stade Louis II, Monaco
Attendance: 4,783
Referee: Sam Barrott (England)

22 October 2026
21:00

Midtjylland (Denmark)	0–1	(Belgium) Sint-Truiden
	Report	Soèllé Soèllé 42'

MCH Arena, Herning
Attendance: 7,336
Referee: Juxhin Xhaja (Albania)

22 October 2026
21:00

Thun (Switzerland)	0–1	(Croatia) Hajduk Split
	Report	Dalisson 17'

Stockhorn Arena, Thun
Attendance: 10,000
Referee: Jarred Gillett (England)

22 October 2026
21:00

Borac Banja Luka (Bosnia and Herzegovina)	2–0	(Finland) KuPS
Savić 29'; Deket 50'	Report

Banja Luka City Stadium, Banja Luka
Attendance: 8,224
Referee: Ívar Orri Kristjánsson (Iceland)

22 October 2026
21:00

Lincoln Red Imps (Gibraltar)	1–4	(Netherlands) Twente
Nano 38'	Report	Van den Belt 19', 57'; Weghorst 24'; Weidmann 90+3'

Europa Sports Park, Gibraltar (Note: Lincoln Red Imps will play their home matches at Europa Sports Park, Gibraltar, instead of their regular stadium, Victoria Stadium, Gibraltar, due to renovation works.)
Attendance: 1,238
Referee: Matteo Marcenaro (Italy)

22 October 2026
21:00 (20:00 UTC+1)

Braga (Portugal)	2–0	(Belgium) Gent
Gómez 3'; Martínez 76'	Report

Estádio Municipal, Braga
Attendance: 10,449
Referee: Andris Treimanis (Latvia)

=== Matchday 3 ===
5 November 2026
18:45

AGF (Denmark)	0−0	(Portugal) Braga
	Report

Randers Stadium, Randers
Attendance: 7,301
Referee: Florian Badstübner (Germany)

5 November 2026
18:45

Atalanta (Italy)	1−1	(Kazakhstan) Kairat
Krstović 82'	Report	Gual 53'

Stadio di Bergamo, Bergamo
Attendance: 18,218
Referee: Julian Weinberger (Austria)

5 November 2026
18:45

Midtjylland (Denmark)	1−6	(Netherlands) Ajax
Etim 28'	Report	Arokodare 9', 52'; Wijndal 59'; Klaassen 67'; Gloukh 74'; Marcos Leonardo 82'

MCH Arena, Herning
Attendance: 11,068
Referee: Paweł Raczkowski (Poland)

5 November 2026
18:45

Thun (Switzerland)	3−1	(Scotland) Heart of Midlothian
McCart 22' (o.g.); Labeau 34'; Dursun 56'	Report	Findlay 82'

Stockhorn Arena, Thun
Attendance: 8,765
Referee: Kyriakos Athanasiou (Cyprus)

5 November 2026
18:45

Red Star Belgrade (Serbia)	2−1	(Andorra) Inter Club d'Escaldes
Lučić 80'; Díaz 90+2' (o.g.)	Report	Arellano 62'

Red Star Stadium, Belgrade
Attendance: 12,681
Referee: Henrik Nalbandyan (Armenia)

5 November 2026
18:45 (19:45 UTC+2)

KuPS (Finland)	0−0	(Belgium) Gent
	Report

Tammelan Stadion, Tampere
Attendance: 2,127
Referee: Rob Harvey (Republic of Ireland)

5 November 2026
18:45

Lincoln Red Imps (Gibraltar)	1−0	(Croatia) Hajduk Split
Hadžikadunić 89' (o.g.)	Report

Europa Sports Park, Gibraltar
Attendance: 1,309
Referee: Patryk Gryckiewicz (Poland)

5 November 2026
18:45

Mjällby AIF (Sweden)	2−0	(Bosnia and Herzegovina) Borac Banja Luka
Bergström 54'; Enggård 88'	Report

Olympia, Helsingborg
Attendance: 3,229
Referee: Gal Laibuvitz (Israel)

5 November 2026
18:45 (20:45 UTC+3)

Trabzonspor (Turkey)	0−1	(Germany) SC Freiburg
	Report	Kübler 14'

Şenol Güneş Sports Complex, Trabzon
Attendance: 26,830
Referee: Kristo Tohver (Estonia)

5 November 2026
21:00

Monaco (France)	2–0	(Denmark) Nordsjælland
Detourbet 33'; Abline 90+1'	Report

Stade Louis II, Monaco
Attendance: 3,425
Referee: Antoni Bandić (Bosnia and Herzegovina)

5 November 2026
21:00

Copenhagen (Denmark)	2–1	(Georgia (country)) Iberia 1999
Elyounoussi 19' (pen.); Selimović 22' (o.g.)	Report	Dzagania 30'

Parken Stadium, Copenhagen
Attendance: 18,660
Referee: Rob Hennessy (Republic of Ireland)

5 November 2026
21:00

Lugano (Switzerland)	3–0	(Lithuania) Kauno Žalgiris
Cimignani 11'; Alioski 24'; Dos Santos 32'	Report

AIL Arena, Lugano
Attendance: 5,429
Referee: Yigal Frid (Israel)

5 November 2026
21:00

Twente (Netherlands)	3–1	(Cyprus) Pafos
Nijstad 62'; Ørjasæter 76'; Weidmann 82'	Report	Lelê 40'

De Grolsch Veste, Enschede
Attendance: 28,500
Referee: Michal Očenáš (Slovakia)

5 November 2026
21:00

Getafe (Spain)	0–1	(England) Brighton & Hove Albion
	Report	Yalcouyé 64'

Coliseum, Getafe
Attendance: 8,007
Referee: Filip Glova (Slovakia)

5 November 2026
21:00

Sint-Truiden (Belgium)	1–1	(Norway) Brann
Ishiwatari 48'	Report	Mathisen 79'

Stayen, Sint-Truiden
Attendance: 6,415
Referee: Oliver Reitala (Finland)

5 November 2026
21:00 (22:00 UTC+2)

Panathinaikos (Greece)	2–1	(Bulgaria) CSKA Sofia
Calabria 41'; Taborda 68'	Report	Almeida 44'

Olympic Stadium, Athens
Attendance: 20,505
Referee: Mohammed Al-Hakim (Sweden)

5 November 2026
21:00 (22:00 UTC+2)

Riga (Latvia)	1–1	(Czech Republic) Jablonec
Ramires 35' (pen.)	Report	Nebyla 49'

Skonto Stadium, Riga
Attendance: 4,152
Referee: Viktor Kopiyevskyi (Ukraine)

5 November 2026
21:00 (22:00 UTC+2)

Universitatea Craiova (Romania)	2–0	(Albania) Egnatia
Cicâldău 24'; Bancu 32'	Report

Ion Oblemenco Stadium, Craiova
Attendance: 14,515
Referee: Don Robertson (Scotland)

=== Matchday 4 ===
26 November 2026
16:30 (20:30 UTC+5)

Kairat (Kazakhstan)	v	(Sweden) Mjällby AIF
	Report

Central Stadium, Almaty

26 November 2026
18:45

Ajax (Netherlands)	v	(Switzerland) Thun
	Report

Johan Cruyff Arena, Amsterdam

26 November 2026
18:45 (17:45 UTC+0)

Brighton & Hove Albion (England)	v	(Romania) Universitatea Craiova
	Report

Falmer Stadium, Brighton and Hove

26 November 2026
18:45 (21:45 UTC+4)

Iberia 1999 (Georgia (country))	v	(Spain) Getafe
	Report

Mikheil Meskhi Stadium, Tbilisi

26 November 2026
18:45

Jablonec (Czech Republic)	v	(Switzerland) Lugano
	Report

Stadion Střelnice, Jablonec nad Nisou

26 November 2026
18:45 (19:45 UTC+2)

Kauno Žalgiris (Lithuania)	v	(Latvia) Riga
	Report

Darius and Girėnas Stadium, Kaunas

26 November 2026
18:45 (17:45 UTC+0)

Heart of Midlothian (Scotland)	v	(France) Monaco
	Report

Tynecastle Park, Edinburgh

26 November 2026
18:45

Egnatia (Albania)	v	(Gibraltar) Lincoln Red Imps
	Report

Arena Kombëtare, Tirana

26 November 2026
18:45 (19:45 UTC+2)

Pafos (Cyprus)	v	(Denmark) Midtjylland
	Report

Alphamega Stadium, Limassol

26 November 2026
18:45

Brann (Norway)	v	(Denmark) AGF
	Report

Brann Stadion, Bergen

26 November 2026
21:00

Nordsjælland (Denmark)	v	(Greece) Panathinaikos
	Report

Right to Dream Park, Farum

26 November 2026
21:00

Borac Banja Luka (Bosnia and Herzegovina)	v	(Italy) Atalanta
	Report

Banja Luka City Stadium, Banja Luka

26 November 2026
21:00

Hajduk Split (Croatia)	v	(Belgium) Sint-Truiden
	Report

Stadion Poljud, Split

26 November 2026
21:00

Inter Club d'Escaldes (Andorra)	v	(Denmark) Copenhagen
	Report

Estadi de la FAF, Encamp

26 November 2026
21:00

Gent (Belgium)	v	(Serbia) Red Star Belgrade
	Report

Planet Group Arena, Ghent

26 November 2026
21:00 (22:00 UTC+2)

CSKA Sofia (Bulgaria)	v	(Turkey) Trabzonspor
	Report

Vasil Levski National Stadium, Sofia

26 November 2026
21:00 (20:00 UTC+0)

Braga (Portugal)	v	(Finland) KuPS
	Report

Estádio Municipal, Braga

26 November 2026
21:00

SC Freiburg (Germany)	v	(Netherlands) Twente
	Report

Europa-Park Stadion, Freiburg im Breisgau

=== Matchday 5 ===
10 December 2026
16:30 (20:30 UTC+5)

Kairat (Kazakhstan)	v	(Romania) Universitatea Craiova
	Report

Central Stadium, Almaty

10 December 2026
18:45

Copenhagen (Denmark)	v	(Switzerland) Lugano
	Report

Parken Stadium, Copenhagen

10 December 2026
18:45 (21:45 UTC+4)

Iberia 1999 (Georgia (country))	v	(Serbia) Red Star Belgrade
	Report

Mikheil Meskhi Stadium, Tbilisi

10 December 2026
18:45

Getafe (Spain)	v	(Andorra) Inter Club d'Escaldes
	Report

Coliseum, Getafe

10 December 2026
18:45 (19:45 UTC+2)

KuPS (Finland)	v	(Bulgaria) CSKA Sofia
	Report

Tammelan Stadion, Tampere

10 December 2026
18:45

Lincoln Red Imps (Gibraltar)	v	(Denmark) Midtjylland
	Report

Europa Sports Park, Gibraltar

10 December 2026
18:45 (19:45 UTC+2)

Riga (Latvia)	v	(Italy) Atalanta
	Report

Skonto Stadium, Riga

10 December 2026
18:45

SC Freiburg (Germany)	v	(Greece) Panathinaikos
	Report

Europa-Park Stadion, Freiburg im Breisgau

10 December 2026
18:45

Brann (Norway)	v	(Portugal) Braga
	Report

Brann Stadion, Bergen

10 December 2026
18:45 (20:45 UTC+3)

Trabzonspor (Turkey)	v	(Czech Republic) Jablonec
	Report

Şenol Güneş Sports Complex, Trabzon

10 December 2026
21:00

AGF (Denmark)	v	(Netherlands) Twente
	Report

Randers Stadium, Randers

10 December 2026
21:00 (20:00 UTC+0)

Brighton & Hove Albion (England)	v	(France) Monaco
	Report

Falmer Stadium, Brighton and Hove

10 December 2026
21:00

Thun (Switzerland)	v	(Belgium) Gent
	Report

Stockhorn Arena, Thun

10 December 2026
21:00 (20:00 UTC+0)

Heart of Midlothian (Scotland)	v	(Bosnia and Herzegovina) Borac Banja Luka
	Report

Tynecastle Park, Edinburgh

10 December 2026
21:00

Hajduk Split (Croatia)	v	(Denmark) Nordsjælland
	Report

Stadion Poljud, Split

10 December 2026
21:00

Sint-Truiden (Belgium)	v	(Netherlands) Ajax
	Report

Stayen, Sint-Truiden

10 December 2026
21:00

Egnatia (Albania)	v	(Lithuania) Kauno Žalgiris
	Report

Arena Kombëtare, Tirana

10 December 2026
21:00

Mjällby AIF (Sweden)	v	(Cyprus) Pafos
	Report

Olympia, Helsingborg

=== Matchday 6 ===
17 December 2026
21:00

Ajax (Netherlands)	v	(Spain) Getafe
	Report

Johan Cruyff Arena, Amsterdam

17 December 2026
21:00

Monaco (France)	v	(Gibraltar) Lincoln Red Imps
	Report

Stade Louis II, Monaco

17 December 2026
21:00

Atalanta (Italy)	v	(Sweden) Mjällby AIF
	Report

Stadio di Bergamo, Bergamo

17 December 2026
21:00

Lugano (Switzerland)	v	(Belgium) Sint-Truiden
	Report

AIL Arena, Lugano

17 December 2026
21:00

Midtjylland (Denmark)	v	(Croatia) Hajduk Split
	Report

MCH Arena, Herning

17 December 2026
21:00

Nordsjælland (Denmark)	v	(Finland) KuPS
	Report

Right to Dream Park, Farum

17 December 2026
21:00

Twente (Netherlands)	v	(Kazakhstan) Kairat
	Report

De Grolsch Veste, Enschede

17 December 2026
21:00

Borac Banja Luka (Bosnia and Herzegovina)	v	(Latvia) Riga
	Report

Banja Luka City Stadium, Banja Luka

17 December 2026
21:00

Red Star Belgrade (Serbia)	v	(Turkey) Trabzonspor
	Report

Red Star Stadium, Belgrade

17 December 2026
21:00

Jablonec (Czech Republic)	v	(Georgia (country)) Iberia 1999
	Report

Stadion Střelnice, Jablonec nad Nisou

17 December 2026
21:00 (22:00 UTC+2)

Kauno Žalgiris (Lithuania)	v	(Germany) SC Freiburg
	Report

Darius and Girėnas Stadium, Kaunas

17 December 2026
21:00

Inter Club d'Escaldes (Andorra)	v	(Denmark) AGF
	Report

Estadi de la FAF, Encamp

17 December 2026
21:00

Gent (Belgium)	v	(Norway) Brann
	Report

Planet Group Arena, Ghent

17 December 2026
21:00 (22:00 UTC+2)

Pafos (Cyprus)	v	(Scotland) Heart of Midlothian
	Report

Alphamega Stadium, Limassol

17 December 2026
21:00 (22:00 UTC+2)

Panathinaikos (Greece)	v	(England) Brighton & Hove Albion
	Report

Olympic Stadium, Athens

17 December 2026
21:00 (22:00 UTC+2)

CSKA Sofia (Bulgaria)	v	(Switzerland) Thun
	Report

Vasil Levski National Stadium, Sofia

17 December 2026
21:00 (20:00 UTC+0)

Braga (Portugal)	v	(Albania) Egnatia
	Report

Estádio Municipal, Braga

17 December 2026
21:00 (22:00 UTC+2)

Universitatea Craiova (Romania)	v	(Denmark) Copenhagen
	Report

Ion Oblemenco Stadium, Craiova
