= CS Universitatea Craiova in European football =

Romanian football club's statistics

- Club: Universitatea Craiova
- First entry: 1973–74 UEFA Cup
- Latest entry: 2026–27 UEFA Europa League

CS Universitatea Craiova is an association football club from Craiova, Romania.

== Total statistics ==
As of 5 November 2026.

Competition	S	P	W	D	L	GF	GA	GD
UEFA Champions League / European Cup	5	16	6	3	7	21	21	0
UEFA Cup Winners' Cup / European Cup Winners' Cup	3	10	4	2	4	19	15	+4
UEFA Europa League / UEFA Cup	14	55	23	12	20	56	56	0
UEFA Europa Conference League	5	25	11	6	8	41	28	+13
Total	26	106	44	23	66	137	120	+17

== Statistics by country ==
Country	Club	P	W	D	L	GF	GA	GD
Albania	Egnatia	1	1	0	0	2	0	+2
Albania	Laçi	2	0	1	1	0	1	–1
Albania	Partizani	2	2	0	0	2	0	+2
Albania	Vllaznia	2	1	1	0	4	1	+3
Subtotal		7	4	2	1	8	2	+6
Andorra	Inter Club d'Escaldes	1	1	0	0	3	1	+2
Subtotal		1	1	0	0	3	1	+2
Armenia	Ararat-Armenia	2	0	1	1	1	2	
Armenia	Noah	1	0	1	0	1	1	0
Subtotal		3	0	2	1	2	3	-1
Austria	Wiener SC	2	1	1	0	3	1	+2
Austria	SK Rapid Wien	1	1	0	0	1	0	+1
Subtotal		3	2	1	0	4	1	+3
Azerbaijan	Sabail	2	2	0	0	4	2	+2
Subtotal		2	2	0	0	4	2	+2
Belarus	ML Vitebsk	2	2	0	0	5	1	+4
Subtotal		2	2	0	0	5	1	+4
Belgium	Standard Liège	2	0	1	1	1	3	–2
Subtotal		2	0	1	1	1	3	–2
Bosnia and Herzegovina / (Socialist Federal Republic of Yugoslavia) Yugoslavia	Željezničar Sarajevo	2	1	0	1	2	4	–2
Bosnia and Herzegovina / (Socialist Federal Republic of Yugoslavia) Yugoslavia	Sarajevo	2	1	0	1	5	2	+3
Subtotal		4	2	0	2	7	6	+1
Bulgaria	Levski Sofia	2	0	1	1	2	3	–1
Subtotal		2	0	1	1	2	3	–1
Croatia / (Socialist Federal Republic of Yugoslavia) Yugoslavia	Hajduk Split	2	1	0	1	1	1	0
Subtotal		2	1	0	1	1	1	0
Cyprus	Olympiakos Nicosia	2	2	0	0	8	1	+7
Subtotal		2	2	0	0	8	1	+7
Czech Republic	Sparta Prague	1	0	0	1	1	2	-1
Subtotal		1	0	0	1	1	2	-1
Denmark	Kjøbenhavns Boldklub	2	1	0	1	4	2	+2
Subtotal		2	1	0	1	4	2	+2
England	Leeds United	2	2	0	0	4	0	+4
Subtotal		2	2	0	0	4	0	+4
Finland	KuPS	2	1	1	0	3	2	+1
Subtotal		2	1	1	0	3	2	+1
France	AS Monaco	2	1	0	1	3	2	+1
France	Bordeaux	2	1	0	1	2	1	+1
Subtotal		4	2	0	2	5	3	+2
(Georgia (country)) Georgia	Locomotive Tbilisi	1	0	0	1	1	2	–1
Subtotal		1	0	0	1	1	2	–1
Germany / West Germany	Kaiserslautern	2	1	0	1	3	3	0
Germany / West Germany	Borussia Dortmund	2	0	0	2	0	4	–4
Germany / West Germany	Mönchengladbach	2	1	0	1	1	2	–1
Germany / West Germany	Bayern Munich	2	0	1	1	1	3	–2
Germany / West Germany	Fortuna Düsseldorf	2	0	1	1	4	5	–1
Germany / West Germany	Leipzig	2	0	1	1	2	4	-2
Germany / West Germany	Mainz 05	1	1	0	0	1	0	+1
Subtotal		13	3	3	7	12	21	–9
Greece	Olympiacos	4	3	0	1	5	2	+3
Greece	AEK Athens	3	0	1	2	3	6	–3
Subtotal		7	3	1	3	8	8	0
Hungary	Honvéd	2	0	2	0	0	0	0
Subtotal		2	0	2	0	0	0	0
Israel	Hapoel Be'er Sheva	2	0	2	0	3	3	0
Subtotal		2	0	2	0	3	3	0
Italy	Fiorentina	4	2	1	1	4	2	+2
Italy	Inter Milan	2	0	1	1	1	3	–2
Italy	Milan	2	0	0	2	0	3	–3
Subtotal		8	2	2	4	5	8	–3
Poland	Raków Częstochowa	1	0	0	1	0	2	-2
Subtotal		1	0	0	1	0	2	-2
Portugal	Chaves	2	1	0	1	4	4	0
Portugal	Benfica	2	0	2	0	1	1	0
Subtotal		4	1	2	1	5	5	0
Republic of Ireland	Shamrock Rovers	2	2	0	0	5	0	+5
Subtotal		2	2	0	0	5	0	+5
Russia / Soviet Union	Dynamo Moscow	2	1	0	1	2	2	0
Subtotal		2	1	0	1	2	2	0
Scotland	Dundee United	2	1	0	1	1	3	–2
Subtotal		2	1	0	1	1	3	–2
Serbia / (Socialist Federal Republic of Yugoslavia) Yugoslavia	Red Star Belgrade	2	0	1	1	2	4	–2
Subtotal		2	0	1	1	2	4	–2
Slovakia	Spartak Trnava	2	1	0	1	6	4	+2
Subtotal		2	1	0	1	6	4	+2
Slovenia	Maribor	2	1	0	1	3	4	–1
Subtotal		2	1	0	1	3	4	–1
Spain	Getafe	1	0	1	0	1	1	0
Spain	Real Betis	2	1	0	1	1	1	0
Subtotal		3	1	1	1	2	2	0
Sweden	Åtvidaberg	2	1	0	1	3	4	–1
Subtotal		2	1	0	1	3	4	–1
Turkey	Galatasaray	2	1	0	1	3	2	+1
Turkey	İstanbul Başakşehir	2	2	0	0	5	2	+3
Subtotal		4	3	0	1	8	4	+4
Ukraine / Soviet Union	Dynamo Kyiv	2	0	1	1	2	5	–3
Ukraine / Soviet Union	Zorya Luhansk	2	1	0	1	3	1	+2
Subtotal		4	1	1	2	5	6	–1

== Statistics by competition ==
Notes for the abbreviations in the tables below:

- 1R: First round
- 2R: Second round
- 3R: Third round
- QF: Quarter-finals
- SF: Semi-finals
- 1Q: First qualifying round
- 2Q: Second qualifying round
- 3Q: Third qualifying round
- PO: Play-off round

=== UEFA Champions League / European Cup ===
Season	Round	Country	Club	Home	Away	Aggregate
1974–75	1R	Sweden	Åtvidaberg	2–1	1–3	3–4
1980–81	1R	Italy	Internazionale Milano	1–1	0–2	1–3
1981–82	1R	Greece	Olympiacos	3–0	0–2	3–2
1981–82	2R	Denmark	KB	4–1	0–1	4–2
1981–82	QF	West Germany	Bayern Munich	0–2	1–1	1–3
1991–92	1R	Cyprus	Apollon Limassol	2–0	0–3	2–3
2026–27	1QR	Belarus	Maxline Vitebsk	1–0	4–1	5–1
2026–27	2QR	Bulgaria	Levski Sofia	2–2	0–1	2–3

=== UEFA Cup Winners' Cup / European Cup Winners' Cup ===
Season	Round	Country	Club	Home	Away	Aggregate
1977–78	1R	Cyprus	Olympiakos Nicosia	2–0	6–1	8–1
1977–78	2R	Soviet Union	Dynamo Moscow	2–0 (a.e.t.)	0–2	2–2 (0–3 p)
1978–79	1R	West Germany	Fortuna Düsseldorf	3–4	1–1	4–5
1985–86	1R	France	AS Monaco	3–0	0–2	3–2
1985–86	2R	Soviet Union	Dynamo Kyiv	2–2	0–3	2–5

=== UEFA Europa League / UEFA Cup ===
Season	Round	Country	Club	Home	Away	Aggregate
1973–74	1R	Italy	Fiorentina	1–0	0–0	1–0
1973–74	2R	Belgium	Standard Liège	1–1	0–2	1–3
1975–76	1R	(Socialist Federal Republic of Yugoslavia) Yugoslavia	Red Star Belgrade	1–3	1–1	2–4
1979–80	1R	Austria	Wiener SC	3–1	0–0	3–1
1979–80	2R	England	Leeds United	2–0	2–0	4–0
1979–80	3R	West Germany	Mönchengladbach	1–0	0–2	1–2
1982–83	1R	Italy	Fiorentina	3–1	0–1	3–2
1982–83	2R	Republic of Ireland	Shamrock Rovers	3–0	2–0	5–0
1982–83	3R	France	Bordeaux	2–0 (a.e.t.)	0–1	2–1
1982–83	QF	West Germany	Kaiserslautern	1–0	2–3	3–3 (a)
1982–83	SF	Portugal	Benfica	1–1	0–0	1–1 (a)
1983–84	1R	(Socialist Federal Republic of Yugoslavia) Yugoslavia	Hajduk Split	1–0	0–1 (a.e.t.)	1–1 (1–3 p)
1984–85	1R	Spain	Real Betis	1–0 (a.e.t.)	0–1	1–1 (5–3 p)
1984–85	2R	Greece	Olympiacos	1–0	1–0	2–0
1984–85	3R	(Socialist Federal Republic of Yugoslavia) Yugoslavia	Željezničar	2–0	0–4	2–4
1986–87	1R	Turkey	Galatasaray	2–0	1–2	3–2
1986–87	2R	Scotland	Dundee United	1–0	0–3	1–3
1987–88	1R	Portugal	Chaves	3–2	1–2	4–4 (a)
1990–91	1R	Albania	Partizani	1–0	1–0	2–0
1990–91	2R	West Germany	Borussia Dortmund	0–3	0–1	0–4
2017–18	3QR	Italy	Milan	0–1	0–2	0–3
2018–19	3QR	Germany	Leipzig	1–1	1–3	2–4
2019–20	1QR	Azerbaijan	Sabail	3–2	3–2	6–4
2019–20	2QR	Hungary	Honvéd	0–0	0–0	0–0 (3–1 p)
2019–20	3QR	Greece	AEK Athens	0–2	1–1	1–3
2020–21	1QR	(Georgia (country)) Georgia	Locomotive Tbilisi	—N/a	1–2	—N/a
2026–27	3QR	Finland	KuPS	2–1	1–1	3–2
2026–27	PO	Armenia	Ararat-Armenia	1–1	0–1	1–2

=== UEFA Conference League ===
Season	Round	Club	Home	Away	Aggregate / position
2021–22	2QR	(Albania) Laçi	0–0	0–1	0–1
2022–23	2QR	(Albania) Vllaznia	1–1	3–0	4–1
2022–23	3QR	(Ukraine) Zorya Luhansk	3–0	0–1	3–1
2022–23	PO	(Israel) Hapoel Be'er Sheva	1–1	2–2 (a.e.t.)	3–3 (3–4 p)
2024–25	2QR	(Slovenia) Maribor	3–2	0–2	3–4
2025–26	2QR	(Bosnia and Herzegovina) Sarajevo	4–0	1–2	5–2
2025–26	3QR	(Slovakia) Spartak Trnava	3–0	3–4 (a.e.t.)	6–4
2025–26	PO	(Turkey) İstanbul Başakşehir	3–1	2–1	5–2
2025–26	LP	(Poland) Raków Częstochowa	—N/a	0–2	25th
2025–26	LP	(Armenia) Noah	1–1	—N/a	25th
2025–26	LP	(Austria) Rapid Wien	—N/a	1–0	25th
2025–26	LP	(Germany) Mainz 05	1–0	—N/a	25th
2025–26	LP	(Czech Republic) Sparta Prague	1–2	—N/a	25th
2025–26	LP	(Greece) AEK Athens	—N/a	2–3	25th
2026–27	LP	(Spain) Getafe CF	1–1	—N/a	TBA
2026–27	LP	(Andorra) Inter Club d'Escaldes	—N/a	3–1	TBA
2026–27	LP	(Albania) Egnatia	2–0	—N/a	TBA
2026–27	LP	(England) Brighton	—N/a		TBA
2026–27	LP	(Kazakhstan) Kairat	—N/a		TBA
2026–27	LP	(Denmark) Copenhagen		—N/a	TBA
