= 2026–27 UEFA Conference League qualifying (third and play-off round matches) =

European football qualifying matches for the 2026–27 UEFA Conference League

This page summarises the matches of the third qualifying and play-off rounds of 2026–27 UEFA Conference League qualifying.

Times are CEST (UTC+2), as listed by UEFA (local times, if different, are in parentheses).

== Third qualifying round ==
=== Summary ===
The first legs were played on 4, 5 and 6 August, and the second legs were played on 11, 12 and 13 August 2026.

The winners of the ties advanced to the play-off round.

Third qualifying round
Team 1	Agg.	Team 2	1st leg	2nd leg
Champions Path
Tre Fiori (San Marino)	1–9	(Kosovo) Drita	1–4	0–5
Borac Banja Luka (Bosnia and Herzegovina)	2–2 (4–2 p)	(Belarus) ML Vitebsk	1–0	1–2 (a.e.t.)
Inter Club d'Escaldes (Andorra)	6–0 (Note: Order of legs reversed after original draw.)	(Estonia) Flora	2–0	4–0
Riga (Latvia)	2–1	(Hungary) ETO Győr	1–0	1–1
Main Path
Inter Turku (Finland)	4–3	(Liechtenstein) Vaduz	2–1	2–2
Žalgiris (Lithuania)	2–9	(Croatia) Hajduk Split	2–5	0–4
Partizan (Serbia)	5–1	(Kazakhstan) Tobol	3–0	2–1
Panathinaikos (Greece)	3–2	(Bulgaria) CSKA 1948	1–1	2–1 (a.e.t.)
Ajax (Netherlands)	5–3	(Republic of Ireland) Shelbourne	3–1	2–2
Auda (Latvia)	1–4	(Albania) Dinamo City	1–0	0–4
Noah (Armenia)	3–4	(Switzerland) Sion	2–2	1–2
Braga (Portugal)	1–0	(Belarus) Dinamo Minsk	1–0	0–0
Valur (Iceland)	0–7	(Denmark) Nordsjælland	0–2	0–5
Sheriff Tiraspol (Moldova)	2–8	(Switzerland) St. Gallen	1–3	1–5
Hapoel Tel Aviv (Israel)	3–2	(Poland) GKS Katowice	2–0	1–2
Beitar Jerusalem (Israel)	3–3 (2–4 p)	Austria Wien	1–2	2–1 (a.e.t.)
CFR Cluj (Romania)	1–7	(Norway) Tromsø	0–5	1–2
Dynamo Kyiv (Ukraine)	1–2	(Azerbaijan) Qarabağ	1–0	0–2
Brann (Norway)	4–3	(Cyprus) Apollon Limassol	0–1	4–2 (a.e.t.)
Lugano (Switzerland)	4–2	(Faroe Islands) NSÍ	2–0	2–2
Raków Częstochowa (Poland)	1–0	(Sweden) Hammarby IF	0–0	1–0
HJK (Finland)	1–3	(Scotland) Motherwell	1–1	0–2
Hibernian (Scotland)	2–1	(North Macedonia) Shkëndija	2–1	0–0
IFK Göteborg (Sweden)	1–2	(Belgium) Gent	0–1	1–1
Paide Linnameeskond (Estonia)	1–6	(Austria) Rapid Wien	1–4	0–2
Bohemians (Republic of Ireland)	2–5	(Denmark) Midtjylland	0–2	2–3
Debrecen (Hungary)	1–8	(Denmark) Copenhagen	0–3	1–5
Jablonec (Czech Republic)	4–1	(Latvia) RFS	2–0	2–1
Rijeka (Croatia)	2–1	(Finland) Ilves	1–0	1–1
Twente (Netherlands)	9–3	(Slovakia) DAC Dunajská Streda	6–0	3–3

=== Champions Path matches ===
6 August 2026
21:00

Tre Fiori (San Marino)	1–4	(Kosovo) Drita
Prandelli 56'	Report	Ovouka 61'; Bl. Krasniqi 62'; Be. Krasniqi 82', 90+3' (pen.)

San Marino Stadium, Serravalle
Attendance: 258
Referee: Mikkel Redder (Denmark)
13 August 2026
20:00

Drita (Kosovo)	5–0	(San Marino) Tre Fiori
Nguena 20' 40'; Manaj 43' 60'; Arthur 47'	Report

Fadil Vokrri Stadium, Pristina (Note: Drita played their home match at Fadil Vokrri Stadium instead of their regular stadium, Gjilan City Stadium, which did not meet UEFA requirements.)
Attendance: 1,822
Referee: Don Robertson (Scotland)

Drita won 9–1 on aggregate.

6 August 2026
20:30

Borac Banja Luka (Bosnia and Herzegovina)	1–0	(Belarus) ML Vitebsk
Savić 14'	Report

Banja Luka City Stadium, Banja Luka
Attendance: 8,350
Referee: Joey Kooij (Netherlands)
13 August 2026
19:00

ML Vitebsk (Belarus)	2–1 (a.e.t.)	(Bosnia and Herzegovina) Borac Banja Luka
Cleonise 45+1'; Kontsevoy 120+5'	Report	Deket 103'
Penalties
Volkov (penalty scored); Kontsevoy (penalty scored); Gnaka (penalty missed); Gomanov (penalty missed)	2–4	(penalty scored) Vranješ; (penalty scored) Hiroš; (penalty scored) Deket; (penalty scored) Herrera

Mezőkövesdi Városi Stadion, Mezőkövesd, Hungary (Note: Due to the country's involvement in the Russian invasion of Ukraine, Belarusian teams were required to play their home matches at neutral venues and behind closed doors until further notice.)
Attendance: 1
Referee: Andrew Madley (England)

2–2 on aggregate; Borac Banja Luka won 4–2 on penalties.

6 August 2026
19:00

Inter Club d'Escaldes (Andorra)	2–0	(Estonia) Flora
Chouaib 5'; Berlanga 62'	Report

Estadi de la FAF, Andorra la Vella
Attendance: 350
Referee: Stefan Ebner (Austria)
13 August 2026
18:00 (19:00 UTC+3)

Flora (Estonia)	0–4	(Andorra) Inter Club d'Escaldes
	Report	Molina 17'; Chouaib 69', 81'; Arellano 77'

Lilleküla Stadium, Tallinn
Attendance: 2,283
Referee: Pavle Ilić (Serbia)

Inter Club d'Escaldes won 6–0 in aggregate.

6 August 2026
19:00 (20:00 UTC+3)

Riga (Latvia)	1–0	(Hungary) ETO Győr
Selyem 4' (o.g.)	Report

Skonto Stadium, Riga
Attendance: 5,194
Referee: Gal Leibovitz (Israel)
13 August 2026
20:30

ETO Győr (Hungary)	1–1	(Latvia) Riga
Gavrić 28' (pen.)	Report	Caio Ferreira 88'

ETO Park, Győr
Attendance: 4,242
Referee: Oliver Reitala (Finland)

Riga won 2–1 on aggregate.

=== Main Path matches ===
6 August 2026
17:00 (18:00 UTC+3)

Inter Turku (Finland)	2–1	(Liechtenstein) Vaduz
Stark 22' (o.g.); Ahiabu 68'	Report	Sorgić 63'

Kupittaa Football Stadium, Turku
Attendance: 3,719
Referee: Eric Wattellier (France)
13 August 2026
19:30

Vaduz (Liechtenstein)	2–2	(Finland) Inter Turku
Simani 4'; Dalipi 56'	Report	Tuominen 13'; Conteh 76'

Rheinpark Stadion, Vaduz
Attendance: 1,359
Referee: Filip Glova (Slovakia)

Inter Turku won 4–3 on aggregate.

6 August 2026
19:00 (20:00 UTC+3)

Žalgiris (Lithuania)	2–5	(Croatia) Hajduk Split
Petković 34'; Capan 86'	Report	Šego 5' (pen.), 44'; Pajaziti 55'; Dalisson 72'; Pukštas 75'

LFF Stadium, Vilnius
Attendance: 4,975
Referee: Marc Nagtegaal (Netherlands)
13 August 2026
21:00

Hajduk Split (Croatia)	4–0	(Lithuania) Žalgiris
Melnjak 54'; Huram 69'; Lupano 80' (o.g.); Šego 83'	Report

Stadion Poljud, Split
Attendance: 20,229
Referee: Matthias Jöllenbeck (Germany)

Hajduk Split won 9–2 on aggregate.

6 August 2026
21:00

Partizan (Serbia)	3–0	(Kazakhstan) Tobol
Seck 32'; Zubairu 64'; Traorè 90+4'	Report

Partizan Stadium, Belgrade
Attendance: 10,367
Referee: Luis Godinho (Portugal)
13 August 2026
17:00 (20:00 UTC+5)

Tobol (Kazakhstan)	1–2	(Serbia) Partizan
Chesnokov 7'	Report	Mitrović 47'; Traorè 90+2'

Kostanay Central Stadium, Kostanay
Attendance: 6,129
Referee: Daniele Chiffi (Italy)

Partizan won 5–1 on aggregate.

5 August 2026
20:30 (21:30 UTC+3)

Panathinaikos (Greece)	1–1	(Bulgaria) CSKA 1948
Jagušić 21'	Report	Rusev 31'

Olympic Stadium, Athens
Attendance: 17,929
Referee: Matteo Marchetti (Italy)
11 August 2026
19:30 (20:30 UTC+3)

CSKA 1948 (Bulgaria)	1–2 (a.e.t.)	(Greece) Panathinaikos
Dvali 87'	Report	García 60'; Dessers 95'

Vasil Levski National Stadium, Sofia (Note: CSKA 1948 played their third qualifying round home match at Vasil Levski National Stadium in Sofia, rather than at their regular home ground, Stadion Bistritsa in Bistritsa, which did not fulfil UEFA requirements.)
Attendance: 2,654
Referee: Jasper Vergoote (Belgium)

Panathinaikos won 3–2 on aggregate.

6 August 2026
20:00

Ajax (Netherlands)	3–1	(Republic of Ireland) Shelbourne
Godts 6' (pen.); Wijndal 22'; Dolberg 50'	Report	Kelly 84'

Johan Cruyff Arena, Amsterdam
Attendance: 51,871
Referee: Atilla Karaoglan (Turkey)
13 August 2026
20:45 (19:45 UTC+1)

Shelbourne (Republic of Ireland)	2–2	(Netherlands) Ajax
Freitas 24'; Moore 85'	Report	Brandt 20'; Gaaei 39'

Tolka Park, Dublin
Attendance: 4,344
Referee: Cláudio Pereira (Portugal)

Ajax won 5–3 on aggregate.

4 August 2026
18:00 (19:00 UTC+3)

Auda (Latvia)	1–0	(Albania) Dinamo City
Diedhiou 68'	Report

Skonto Stadium, Riga (Note: Auda play their home matches at Skonto Stadium in Riga, rather than at their regular home ground, the Ķekava Stadium in Ķekava, which did not fulfill UEFA requirements.)
Attendance: 2,839
Referee: José Luis Munuera Montero (Spain)
13 August 2026
21:00

Dinamo City (Albania)	4–0	(Latvia) Auda
Qardaku 36'; Qefalija 45'; Ayodeji 52'; Fadairo 79'	Report

Elbasan Arena, Elbasan (Note: Dinamo City played their home matches at Elbasan Arena in Elbasan instead of their own stadium, Selman Stërmasi Stadium in Tirana, which did not fulfil UEFA requirements.)
Attendance: 800
Referee: Christos Vergetis (Greece)

Dinamo City won 4–1 on aggregate.

6 August 2026
18:00 (20:00 UTC+4)

Noah (Armenia)	2–2	(Switzerland) Sion
Ferreira 5' (pen.); Manvelyan 20'	Report	Boteli 13'; Chouaref 57'

Vahagn Tumasyan Stadium, Abovyan
Attendance: 3,000
Referee: Matthew De Gabriele (Malta)
13 August 2026
20:15

Sion (Switzerland)	2–1	(Armenia) Noah
Boteli 54'; Batata 63'	Report	Ferreira 25' (pen.)

Stade Tourbillon, Sion
Attendance: 8,150
Referee: David Šmajc (Slovenia)

Sion won 4–3 on aggregate.

6 August 2026
20:30 (19:30 UTC+1)

Braga (Portugal)	1–0	(Belarus) Dinamo Minsk
Horta 45' (pen.)	Report

Estádio Municipal, Braga
Attendance: 14,586
Referee: Christian-Petru Ciochirca (Austria)
13 August 2026
19:00 (20:00 UTC+3)

Dinamo Minsk (Belarus)	0–0	(Portugal) Braga
	Report

Stadion Beroe, Stara Zagora, Bulgaria
Attendance: 0
Referee: Szabolcs Kovacs (Romania)

Braga won 1–0 on aggregate.

6 August 2026
20:30 (18:30 UTC)

Valur (Iceland)	0–2	(Denmark) Nordsjælland
	Report	Berthelsen 30'; Røjkjær 78' (pen.)

Hlíðarendi, Reykjavík
Attendance: 568
Referee: Gergő Bogár (Hungary)
13 August 2026
19:00

Nordsjælland (Denmark)	5–0	(Iceland) Valur
Boe 5'; Berthelsen 45+3'; Walker 62'; Sadio 72'; Nene 74'	Report

Right to Dream Park, Farum
Attendance: 3,289
Referee: Edgars Maļcevs (Latvia)

Nordsjælland won 7–0 in aggregate.

6 August 2026
19:00 (20:00 UTC+3)

Sheriff Tiraspol (Moldova)	1–3	(Switzerland) St. Gallen
Pineda 89'	Report	Hunziker 63'; Frokaj 70'; Witzig 90+2'

Sheriff Arena, Tiraspol
Attendance: 4,889
Referee: Adam Ladebäck (Sweden)
13 August 2026
20:00

St. Gallen (Switzerland)	5–1	(Moldova) Sheriff Tiraspol
Besio 1', 76'; Hunziker 34', 59'; Stevanović 87'	Report	Forov 9'

Sitterstadion, St. Gallen
Attendance: 12,296
Referee: Julian Weinberger (Austria)

St. Gallen won 8–2 on aggregate.

6 August 2026
20:00

Hapoel Tel Aviv (Israel)	2–0	(Poland) GKS Katowice
Turiel 5'; Alkukin 18'	Report

Diósgyőri Stadion, Miskolc, Hungary (Note: Due to the Gaza war, Israeli teams were required to play their home matches at neutral venues until further notice.)
Attendance: 3,006
Referee: Bastien Dechepy (France)
12 August 2026
18:00

GKS Katowice (Poland)	2–1	(Israel) Hapoel Tel Aviv
Shkurin 83'; Jędrych 90' (pen.)	Report	Turiel 23'

Arena Katowice, Katowice
Attendance: 12,420
Referee: Alexandros Tsakalidis (Greece)

Hapoel Tel Aviv won 3–2 on aggregate.

6 August 2026
19:30 (20:30 UTC+3)

Beitar Jerusalem (Israel)	1–2	Austria Wien
Muche 19'	Report	Markovic 45'; Šaljić 69'

Stadionul Ilie Oană, Ploiești, Romania
Attendance: 1,450
Referee: Lawrence Visser (Belgium)
13 August 2026
20:30

Austria Wien	1–2 (a.e.t.)	(Israel) Beitar Jerusalem
Boateng 58'	Report	Atzili 33'; Kalu 56'
Penalties
M. Fischer (penalty scored); Lee Tae-seok (penalty scored); Ranftl (penalty scored); Markovic (penalty missed); Šaljić (penalty scored)	4–2	(penalty scored) Carabalí; (penalty scored) Yosefi; (penalty missed) Ansah; (penalty missed) Muzie

Generali Arena, Vienna
Attendance: 7,663
Referee: Lukasz Kuzma (Poland)

3–3 on aggregate; Austria Wien won 4–2 on penalties.

6 August 2026
18:30 (19:30 UTC+3)

CFR Cluj (Romania)	0–5	(Norway) Tromsø
	Report	H. Larsen 5', 20'; Dahlqvist 27', 61', 74'

Stadionul Dr. Constantin Rădulescu, Cluj-Napoca
Attendance: 6,729
Referee: Patrik Kolarić (Croatia)
13 August 2026
19:00

Tromsø (Norway)	2–1	(Romania) CFR Cluj
Hien 6'; Vådebu 48'	Report	Korenica 78'

Romssa Arena, Tromsø
Attendance: 4,220
Referee: David Dickinson (Scotland)

Tromsø won 7–1 on aggregate.

6 August 2026
19:00

Dynamo Kyiv (Ukraine)	1–0	(Azerbaijan) Qarabağ
Ponomarenko 10'	Report

Arena Lublin, Lublin, Poland (Note: Due to the Russian invasion of Ukraine, Ukrainian teams were required to play their home matches at neutral venues until further notice.)
Attendance: 4,335
Referee: Morten Krogh (Denmark)
13 August 2026
18:00 (20:00 UTC+4)

Qarabağ (Azerbaijan)	2–0	(Ukraine) Dynamo Kyiv
Mouaddib 12'; Kashchuk 69'	Report

Tofiq Bahramov Republican Stadium, Baku
Attendance: 26,449
Referee: Stuart Attwell (England)

Qarabağ won 2–1 on aggregate.

5 August 2026
19:00

Brann (Norway)	0–1	(Cyprus) Apollon Limassol
	Report	Ožbolt 22'

Brann Stadion, Bergen
Attendance: 12,750
Referee: Damian Kos (Poland)
11 August 2026
19:00 (20:00 UTC+3)

Apollon Limassol (Cyprus)	2–4 (a.e.t.)	(Norway) Brann
Ljubić 86'; Weissbeck 92'	Report	Ingason 16'; Holm 90+6', 95'; Eriksen 105'

Alphamega Stadium, Limassol
Attendance: 7,253
Referee: Rob Harvey (Republic of Ireland)

Brann won 4–3 on aggregate.

6 August 2026
20:30

Lugano (Switzerland)	2–0	(Faroe Islands) NSÍ
Pihlström 7'; Behrens 79'	Report

Lugano Arena, Lugano
Attendance: 3,328
Referee: Viktor Kopiyevskyi (Ukraine)
13 August 2026
19:30 (18:30 UTC+1)

NSÍ (Faroe Islands)	2–2	(Switzerland) Lugano
P. Knudsen 29'; Lindh 61'	Report	Cimignani 67'; Behrens 80'

Við Djúpumýrar, Klaksvík (Note: NSÍ played their home matches at Við Djúpumýrar in Klaksvík instead of their own stadium, Við Løkin in Runavík, which did not fulfil UEFA requirements.)
Attendance: 697
Referee: Rob Hennessy (Republic of Ireland)

Lugano won 4–2 on aggregate.

6 August 2026
19:00

Raków Częstochowa (Poland)	0–0	(Sweden) Hammarby IF
	Report

Miejski Stadion Piłkarski Raków, Częstochowa
Attendance: 5,089
Referee: Henrik Nalbandyan (Armenia)
13 August 2026
19:00

Hammarby IF (Sweden)	0–1	(Poland) Raków Częstochowa
	Report	Svarnas 45+2'

3Arena, Stockholm
Attendance: 19,719
Referee: Luca Pairetto (Italy)

Raków Częstochowa won 1–0 on aggregate.

6 August 2026
18:00 (19:00 UTC+3)

HJK (Finland)	1–1	(Scotland) Motherwell
Pukki 71'	Report	Maswanhise 64' (pen.)

Töölö Football Stadium, Helsinki
Attendance: 7,023
Referee: Dalibor Černý (Czech Republic)
13 August 2026
20:30 (19:30 UTC+1)

Motherwell (Scotland)	2–0	(Finland) HJK
Said 47', 60'	Report

Fir Park, Motherwell
Attendance: 8,185
Referee: Michal Očenáš (Slovakia)

Motherwell won 3–1 on aggregate.

6 August 2026
21:00 (20:00 UTC+1)

Hibernian (Scotland)	2–1	(North Macedonia) Shkëndija
Elding 73'; O'Hora 90'	Report	Gjorgjievski 76'

Easter Road, Edinburgh
Attendance: 13,132
Referee: Menelaos Antoniou (Cyprus)
13 August 2026
20:00

Shkëndija (North Macedonia)	0–0	(Scotland) Hibernian
	Report

Toše Proeski Arena, Skopje (Note: Shkëndija played their home matches at Toše Proeski Arena in Skopje instead of their own stadium, Ecolog Arena in Tetovo, which did not fulfill UEFA requirements.)
Attendance: 7,200
Referee: Bulat Sariyev (Kazakhstan)

Hibernian won 2–1 on aggregate.

6 August 2026
19:00

IFK Göteborg (Sweden)	0–1	(Belgium) Gent
	Report	Goore 45'

Gamla Ullevi, Gothenburg
Attendance: 15,468
Referee: Antoni Bandić (Bosnia and Herzegovina)
13 August 2026
20:30

Gent (Belgium)	1–1	(Sweden) IFK Göteborg
Volckaert 27'	Report	Alioum 85'

Planet Group Arena, Ghent
Attendance: 10,531
Referee: Gustavo Correia (Portugal)

Gent won 2–1 on aggregate.

6 August 2026
18:00 (19:00 UTC+3)

Paide Linnameeskond (Estonia)	1–4	(Austria) Rapid Wien
D. Luts 41'	Report	Bolla 5' (pen.); Haïdara 83', 90+4'; Dahl 85'

Lilleküla Stadium, Tallinn (Note: Starting from the third qualifying round, Paide played their home matches at Lilleküla Stadium in Tallinn, rather than at Pärnu Rannastaadion in Pärnu, to meet UEFA requirements.)
Attendance: 5,569
Referee: Danilo Nikolić (Serbia)
12 August 2026
18:00

Rapid Wien (Austria)	2–0	(Estonia) Paide Linnameeskond
Tilio 38'; Schaub 82' (pen.)	Report

Allianz Stadion, Vienna
Attendance: 13,705
Referee: Denys Shurman (Ukraine)

Rapid Wien won 6–1 on aggregate.

6 August 2026
20:45 (19:45 UTC+1)

Bohemians (Republic of Ireland)	0–2	(Denmark) Midtjylland
	Report	Djú 28'; Byskov 77'

Tallaght Stadium, Dublin
Attendance: 6,085
Referee: Rareș Vidican (Romania)
13 August 2026
19:00

Midtjylland (Denmark)	3–2	(Republic of Ireland) Bohemians
Djú 26' (pen.); Johannesen 47'; Iheanacho 78'	Report	Myers 62'; Rooney 88'

MCH Arena, Herning
Attendance: 8,621
Referee: Matteo Marcenaro (Italy)

Midtjylland won 5–2 on aggregate.

6 August 2026
19:00

Debrecen (Hungary)	0–3	(Denmark) Copenhagen
	Report	Pereira 21'; Robert 35'; Cornelius 90+1'

Nagyerdei Stadion, Debrecen
Attendance: 6,120
Referee: Enea Jorgji (Albania)
12 August 2026
18:00

Copenhagen (Denmark)	5–1	(Hungary) Debrecen
Elyounoussi 3', 58' (pen.); Král 76'; Cornelius 78', 90+1'	Report	Dzsudzsák 48'

Parken Stadium, Copenhagen
Attendance: 19,235
Referee: Jérémie Pignard (France)

Copenhagen won 8–1 on aggregate.

6 August 2026
18:00

Jablonec (Czech Republic)	2–0	(Latvia) RFS
Chanturishvili 18'; Polidar 52'	Report

Stadion Střelnice, Jablonec nad Nisou
Attendance: 3,911
Referee: Nathan Verboomen (Belgium)
13 August 2026
18:30 (19:30 UTC+3)

RFS (Latvia)	1–2	(Czech Republic) Jablonec
Lipušček 38'	Report	Sedláček 4'; Nebyla 22'

LNK Sporta Parks, Riga
Attendance: 1,674
Referee: Yigal Frid (Israel)

Jablonec won 4–1 on aggregate.

6 August 2026
20:45

Rijeka (Croatia)	1–0	(Finland) Ilves
Janković 16'	Report

Stadion Rujevica, Rijeka
Attendance: 5,268
Referee: Ishmael Barbara (Malta)
13 August 2026
18:00 (19:00 UTC+3)

Ilves (Finland)	1–1	(Croatia) Rijeka
Baranov 64'	Report	Lasickas 70'

Tammelan Stadion, Tampere
Attendance: 5,198
Referee: Genc Nuza (Kosovo)

Rijeka won 2–1 on aggregate.

6 August 2026
20:00

Twente (Netherlands)	6–0	(Slovakia) DAC Dunajská Streda
Rots 7'; Pjaca 11'; Weidmann 48'; Bruns 56'; Zerrouki 64'; Pröpper 78'	Report

De Grolsch Veste, Enschede
Attendance: 24,135
Referee: Sam Barrott (England)
13 August 2026
19:00

DAC Dunajská Streda (Slovakia)	3–3	(Netherlands) Twente
Gueye 56'; Nemanič 66'; Owusu 88'	Report	Bruns 7'; Pjaca 51', 90+3'

MOL Aréna, Dunajská Streda
Attendance: 3,225
Referee: Florian Badstübner (Germany)

Twente won 9–3 on aggregate.

== Play-off round ==
=== Summary ===
The first legs were played on 20 August, and the second legs were played on 26 and 27 August 2026.

The winners of the ties advanced to the league phase.

Play-off round
Team 1	Agg.	Team 2	1st leg	2nd leg
Champions Path
Víkingur Reykjavík (Iceland)	2–6	(Bosnia and Herzegovina) Borac Banja Luka	1–3	1–3
Shamrock Rovers (Republic of Ireland)	1–2	(Finland) KuPS	1–1	0–1
Drita (Kosovo)	2–2 (2–4 p)	(Andorra) Inter Club d'Escaldes	2–2	0–0 (a.e.t.)
KÍ (Faroe Islands)	1–2	(Latvia) Riga	0–0	1–2
Lincoln Red Imps (Gibraltar)	3–2	(Northern Ireland) Larne	0–2	3–0 (a.e.t.)
Main Path
Motherwell (Scotland)	2–7	(Germany) SC Freiburg	1–3	1–4
Górnik Zabrze (Poland)	3–7	(France) Monaco	2–3	1–4
Inter Turku (Finland)	1–4	(Denmark) Copenhagen	0–0	1–4
Heart of Midlothian (Scotland)	4–4 (4–3 p)	(Austria) Rapid Wien	2–2	2–2 (a.e.t.)
Tromsø (Norway)	0–4	(England) Brighton & Hove Albion	0–0	0–4
Hajduk Split (Croatia)	5–4	(Poland) Raków Częstochowa	2–2	3–2 (a.e.t.)
Panathinaikos (Greece)	4–3	(Czech Republic) Hradec Králové	2–2	2–1 (a.e.t.)
Gent (Belgium)	3–2	(Scotland) Hibernian	0–0	3–2
PAOK (Greece)	3–4	(Norway) Brann	1–1	2–3
Atalanta (Italy)	1–0	(Israel) Hapoel Tel Aviv	0–0	1–0
Midtjylland (Denmark)	6–1	(Croatia) Rijeka	2–0	4–1
Rangers (Scotland)	1–1 (3–4 p)	(Czech Republic) Jablonec	1–0	0–1 (a.e.t.)
Nordsjælland (Denmark)	4–2	(Switzerland) St. Gallen	1–0	3–2
Dinamo City (Albania)	3–5	(Cyprus) Pafos	1–1	2–4 (a.e.t.)
Sion (Switzerland)	5–9	(Netherlands) Ajax	2–4	3–5
Braga (Portugal)	2–0	Austria Wien	2–0	0–0
Twente (Netherlands)	4–2	(Azerbaijan) Qarabağ	0–1	4–1 (a.e.t.)
Getafe (Spain)	4–3	(Serbia) Partizan	3–1	1–2
Lugano (Switzerland)	3–2	(Israel) Maccabi Tel Aviv	2–1	1–1

=== Champions Path matches ===
20 August 2026
20:00 (18:00 UTC)

Víkingur Reykjavík (Iceland)	1–3	(Bosnia and Herzegovina) Borac Banja Luka
Sigurðsson 75' (pen.)	Report	Juričić 21', 86'; Jojić 23'

Víkingsvöllur, Reykjavík
Attendance: 1,108
Referee: Enea Jorgji (Albania)
27 August 2026
20:30

Borac Banja Luka (Bosnia and Herzegovina)	3–1	(Iceland) Víkingur Reykjavík
Herrera 55'; Juričić 67'; Djajić 90+4'	Report	Hrelja 16' (o.g.)

Banja Luka City Stadium, Banja Luka
Attendance: 9,127
Referee: Anastasios Papapetrou (Greece)

Borac Banja Luka won 6–2 on aggregate.

20 August 2026
21:00 (20:00 UTC+1)

Shamrock Rovers (Republic of Ireland)	1–1	(Finland) KuPS
Stevens 50'	Report	Parzyszek 85'

Tallaght Stadium, Dublin
Attendance: 4,522
Referee: Morten Krogh (Denmark)
27 August 2026
17:00 (18:00 UTC+3)

KuPS (Finland)	1–0	(Republic of Ireland) Shamrock Rovers
Burke 75' (o.g.)	Report

Kuopio Football Stadium, Kuopio
Attendance: 2,768
Referee: Patrik Kolarić (Croatia)

KuPS won 2–1 on aggregate.

20 August 2026
20:00

Drita (Kosovo)	2–2	(Andorra) Inter Club d'Escaldes
Salihu 5'; Bl. Krasniqi 43'	Report	Berlanga 13'; López 56'

Fadil Vokrri Stadium, Pristina
Attendance: 2,437
Referee: Rob Hennessy (Ireland)
27 August 2026
19:00

Inter Club d'Escaldes (Andorra)	0–0 (a.e.t.)	(Kosovo) Drita
	Report
Penalties
Diaby (penalty scored); Cámara (penalty scored); Arellano (penalty missed); Pochettino (penalty scored); Chouaib (penalty scored)	4–2	(penalty scored) Be. Krasniqi; (penalty scored) Ovouka; (penalty missed) Abazaj; (penalty missed) Jashari

Estadi de la FAF, Encamp
Attendance: 1,296
Referee: Giorgi Kruashvili (Georgia)

2–2 on aggregate; Inter Club d'Escaldes won 4–2 on penalties.

20 August 2026
19:30 (18:30 UTC+1)

KÍ (Faroe Islands)	0–0	(Latvia) Riga
	Report

Við Djúpumýrar, Klaksvík
Attendance: 1,001
Referee: Sam Barrott (England)
27 August 2026
19:00 (20:00 UTC+3)

Riga (Latvia)	2–1	(Faroe Islands) KÍ
Tellechea 47' (o.g.); Oulad 89'	Report	Klettskarð 67'

Skonto Stadium, Riga
Attendance: 6,339
Referee: Allard Lindhout (Netherlands)

Riga won 2–1 on aggregate.

20 August 2026
18:00

Lincoln Red Imps (Gibraltar)	0–2	(Northern Ireland) Larne
	Report	O'Neill 85'; O'Hara 90+3'

Europa Point Stadium, Gibraltar
Attendance: 646
Referee: Kristo Tohver (Estonia)
27 August 2026
21:00 (20:00 UTC+1)

Larne (Northern Ireland)	0–3 (a.e.t.)	(Gibraltar) Lincoln Red Imps
	Report	Gómez 82'; Toledano 85', 120+1' (pen.)

Inver Park, Larne
Attendance: 1,808
Referee: Radoslav Gidzhenov (Bulgaria)

Lincoln Red Imps won 3–2 on aggregate.

=== Main Path matches ===
20 August 2026
20:30 (19:30 UTC+1)

Motherwell (Scotland)	1–3	(Germany) SC Freiburg
Charles-Cook 2'	Report	Ginter 28', 65' (pen.); Goto 90+6'

Fir Park, Motherwell
Attendance: 8,945
Referee: Radu Petrescu (Romania)
27 August 2026
18:45

SC Freiburg (Germany)	4–1	(Scotland) Motherwell
Scherhant 6'; Matanović 60'; Irié 63'; Goto 85'	Report	Longelo 22'

Europa-Park Stadion, Freiburg im Breisgau
Attendance: 30,841
Referee: Andrea Colombo (Italy)

SC Freiburg won 7–2 on aggregate.

20 August 2026
20:00

Górnik Zabrze (Poland)	2–3	(France) Monaco
Prekop 53'; Liseth 74'	Report	Biereth 9'; Camara 51'; Brunner 58'

Arena Zabrze, Zabrze
Attendance: 23,027
Referee: Martin Matoša (Slovenia)
27 August 2026
18:45

Monaco (France)	4–1	(Poland) Górnik Zabrze
Brunner 30'; Coulibaly 43'; Golovin 50'; Biereth 78'	Report	Antiste 83'

Stade Louis II, Monaco
Attendance: 6,195
Referee: Vasilios Fotias (Greece)

Monaco won 7–3 on aggregate.

20 August 2026
18:00 (19:00 UTC+3)

Inter Turku (Finland)	0–0	(Denmark) Copenhagen
	Report

Kupittaa Football Stadium, Turku
Attendance: 5,489
Referee: Goga Kikacheishvili (Georgia)
27 August 2026
19:00

Copenhagen (Denmark)	4–1	(Finland) Inter Turku
Pereira 41'; Madsen 49'; Clem 78'; Ahiabu 90+3' (o.g.)	Report	Tuominen 69' (pen.)

Parken Stadium, Copenhagen
Attendance: 18,528
Referee: Oleksiy Derevinskyi (Ukraine)

Copenhagen won 4–1 on aggregate.

20 August 2026
20:45 (19:45 UTC+1)

Heart of Midlothian (Scotland)	2–2	(Austria) Rapid Wien
Raux-Yao 56' (o.g.); Wilson 62'	Report	Raux-Yao 30'; Wurmbrand 79'

Tynecastle Park, Edinburgh
Attendance: 18,112
Referee: Manfredas Lukjančukas (Lithuania)
26 August 2026
18:45

Rapid Wien (Austria)	2–2 (a.e.t.)	(Scotland) Heart of Midlothian
Kara 34'; Cvetković 119'	Report	Kaboré 79'; Miller 100'
Penalties
Kara (penalty scored); Schaub (penalty scored); Haïdara (penalty missed); Demir (penalty scored); Tilio (penalty missed)	3–4	(penalty scored) Miller; (penalty scored) Altena; (penalty scored) Mato; (penalty scored) Kerjota; (penalty missed) McEntee

Allianz Stadion, Vienna
Attendance: 23,975
Referee: Elchin Masiyev (Azerbaijan)

4–4 on aggregate; Heart of Midlothian won 4–3 on penalties.

20 August 2026
19:00

Tromsø (Norway)	0–0	(England) Brighton & Hove Albion
	Report

Romssa Arena, Tromsø
Attendance: 6,015
Referee: Edgars Maļcevs (Latvia)
27 August 2026
20:30 (19:30 UTC+1)

Brighton & Hove Albion (England)	4–0	(Norway) Tromsø
Kostoulas 22'; De Cuyper 33'; Wieffer 38'; Boscagli 86'	Report

Falmer Stadium, Brighton and Hove
Attendance: 23,981
Referee: Sander van der Eijk (Netherlands)

Brighton & Hove Albion won 4–0 on aggregate.

20 August 2026
21:00

Hajduk Split (Croatia)	2–2	(Poland) Raków Częstochowa
Šego 21'; Dalisson 48'	Report	Emreli 27'; Diaby-Fadiga 90+5'

Stadion Poljud, Split
Attendance: 25,362
Referee: Michal Očenáš (Slovakia)
27 August 2026
19:00

Raków Częstochowa (Poland)	2–3 (a.e.t.)	(Croatia) Hajduk Split
Diaby-Fadiga 61' (pen.); Emreli 88'	Report	Raçi 1'; Šego 66'; Pukštas 94'

Miejski Stadion Piłkarski Raków, Częstochowa
Attendance: 5,500
Referee: Aliyar Aghayev (Azerbaijan)

Hajduk Split won 5–4 on aggregate.

20 August 2026
20:30 (21:30 UTC+3)

Panathinaikos (Greece)	2–2	(Czech Republic) Hradec Králové
Tetteh 55', 61'	Report	Umar 89', 90+6'

Olympic Stadium, Athens
Attendance: 14,647
Referee: Jérôme Brisard (France)
27 August 2026
19:00

Hradec Králové (Czech Republic)	1–2 (a.e.t.)	(Greece) Panathinaikos
Darida 90+2'	Report	Dessers 72', 120+5' (pen.)

Malšovická aréna, Hradec Králové
Attendance: 9,300
Referee: Sascha Stegemann (Germany)

Panathinaikos won 4–3 on aggregate.

20 August 2026
20:30

Gent (Belgium)	0–0	(Scotland) Hibernian
	Report

Planet Group Arena, Ghent
Attendance: 10,557
Referee: Paweł Raczkowski (Poland)
27 August 2026
21:00 (20:00 UTC+1)

Hibernian (Scotland)	2–3	(Belgium) Gent
Kerr 56'; Passlack 77'	Report	Vergara 39'; Burgess 84'; Chaiwa 90+1' (o.g.)

Easter Road, Edinburgh
Attendance: 18,997
Referee: Juan Martínez Munuera (Spain)

Gent won 3–2 on aggregate.

20 August 2026
19:45 (20:45 UTC+3)

PAOK (Greece)	1–1	(Norway) Brann
Baba 80'	Report	Eriksen 57'

Toumba Stadium, Thessaloniki
Attendance: 14,667
Referee: Daniel Siebert (Germany)
27 August 2026
19:00

Brann (Norway)	3–2	(Greece) PAOK
Holm 45+3'; Ingason 56'; Castro 86' (pen.)	Report	Ndiaye 63'; Zafeiris 68'

Brann Stadion, Bergen
Attendance: 15,483
Referee: John Brooks (England)

Brann won 4–3 on aggregate.

20 August 2026
20:30

Atalanta (Italy)	0–0	(Israel) Hapoel Tel Aviv
	Report

Stadio di Bergamo, Bergamo
Attendance: 21,061
Referee: Javier Alberola Rojas (Spain)
27 August 2026
20:00

Hapoel Tel Aviv (Israel)	0–1	(Italy) Atalanta
	Report	Scamacca 72'

Diósgyőri Stadion, Miskolc, Hungary
Attendance: 5,437
Referee: Daniel Schlager (Germany)

Atalanta won 1–0 on aggregate.

20 August 2026
19:00

Midtjylland (Denmark)	2–0	(Croatia) Rijeka
Cho Gue-sung 20'; Johannesen 48'	Report

MCH Arena, Herning
Attendance: 7,519
Referee: Balázs Berke (Hungary)
27 August 2026
20:45

Rijeka (Croatia)	1–4	(Denmark) Midtjylland
Adu-Adjei 4'	Report	Iheanacho 17'; Osorio 51'; Jensen 56'; Cho Gue-sung 78'

Stadion Rujevica, Rijeka
Attendance: 6,352
Referee: Jasper Vergoote (Belgium)

Midtjylland won 6–1 on aggregate.

20 August 2026
20:45 (19:45 UTC+1)

Rangers (Scotland)	1–0	(Czech Republic) Jablonec
Naderi 50'	Report

Ibrox Stadium, Glasgow
Attendance: 34,701
Referee: Marian Barbu (Romania)
27 August 2026
18:00

Jablonec (Czech Republic)	1–0 (a.e.t.)	(Scotland) Rangers
Chanturishvili 73'	Report
Penalties
Růsek (penalty scored); Sedláček (penalty scored); Zorvan (penalty missed); Okeke (penalty scored); Chramosta (penalty scored)	4–3	(penalty scored) Shankland; (penalty scored) Miovski; (penalty scored) Aasgaard; (penalty missed) Curtis; (penalty missed) Penrice

Stadion Střelnice, Jablonec nad Nisou
Attendance: 5,563
Referee: Nenad Minaković (Serbia)

1–1 on aggregate; Jablonec won 4–3 on penalties.

20 August 2026
19:00

Nordsjælland (Denmark)	1–0	(Switzerland) St. Gallen
Røjkjær 13'	Report

Right to Dream Park, Farum
Attendance: 3,514
Referee: Ondřej Berka (Czech Republic)
27 August 2026
20:00

St. Gallen (Switzerland)	2–3	(Denmark) Nordsjælland
Görtler 21' (pen.); Baldé 28'	Report	Lähteenmäki 14'; Amoako 24'; Boe 82'

Sitterstadion, St. Gallen
Attendance: 13,210
Referee: Orel Grinfeld (Israel)

Nordsjælland won 4–2 on aggregate.

20 August 2026
21:00

Dinamo City (Albania)	1–1	(Cyprus) Pafos
Fadairo 78'	Report	Lelê 83' (pen.)

Elbasan Arena, Elbasan
Attendance: 1,550
Referee: Lawrence Visser (Belgium)
27 August 2026
19:00 (20:00 UTC+3)

Pafos (Cyprus)	4–2 (a.e.t.)	(Albania) Dinamo City
Sema 13'; Ioannou 78'; Ngamaleu 116'; Anderson 120+1'	Report	Fadairo 8'; Silva-Richards 87'

Alphamega Stadium, Limassol (Note: Pafos played their home match at the Alphamega Stadium in Limassol, instead of their regular stadium, the Stelios Kyriakides Stadium, in Paphos, which did not meet UEFA requirements.)
Attendance: 4,378
Referee: Martin Matoša (Slovenia)

Pafos won 5–3 on aggregate.

20 August 2026
20:15

Sion (Switzerland)	2–4	(Netherlands) Ajax
Surdez 34'; Chouaref 71' (pen.)	Report	Brandt 53'; Marcos Leonardo 60'; Arokodare 74'; Klaassen 87'

Stade Tourbillon, Sion
Attendance: 9,000
Referee: Mohammed Al-Hakim (Sweden)
27 August 2026
20:00

Ajax (Netherlands)	5–3	(Switzerland) Sion
Baas 1'; Klaassen 39'; Arokodare 45+1', 51'; Edvardsen 55'	Report	Boteli 19', 36', 90+1'

Johan Cruyff Arena, Amsterdam
Attendance: 50,685
Referee: Julian Weinberger (Austria)

Ajax won 9–5 on aggregate.

20 August 2026
21:00 (20:00 UTC+1)

Braga (Portugal)	2–0	Austria Wien
Víctor 25' (pen.); Rodrigues 88'	Report

Estádio Municipal, Braga
Attendance: 14,293
Referee: Ishmael Barbara (Malta)
27 August 2026
20:30

Austria Wien	0–0	(Portugal) Braga
	Report

Generali Arena, Vienna
Attendance: 9,702
Referee: Nikola Dabanović (Montenegro)

Braga won 2–0 on aggregate.

20 August 2026
20:00

Twente (Netherlands)	0–1	(Azerbaijan) Qarabağ
	Report	Kady 52'

De Grolsch Veste, Enschede
Attendance: 25,250
Referee: Juxhin Xhaja (Albania)
27 August 2026
18:00 (20:00 UTC+4)

Qarabağ (Azerbaijan)	1–4 (a.e.t.)	(Netherlands) Twente
Kady 59'	Report	Pjaca 79'; Bruns 90+2'; Weghorst 94'; Taha 114'

Tofiq Bahramov Republican Stadium, Baku
Attendance: 28,869
Referee: Rohit Saggi (Norway)

Twente won 4–2 on aggregate.

20 August 2026
21:00

Getafe (Spain)	3–1	(Serbia) Partizan
Ünal 10'; García 87'; Mojica 90'	Report	Seck 43'

Coliseum, Getafe
Attendance: 4,968
Referee: Andris Treimanis (Latvia)
27 August 2026
21:00

Partizan (Serbia)	2–1	(Spain) Getafe
Jeh 53'; Kojzek 76'	Report	Ünal 70'

Partizan Stadium, Belgrade
Attendance: 28,247
Referee: Urs Schnyder (Switzerland)

Getafe won 4–3 on aggregate.

20 August 2026
20:30

Lugano (Switzerland)	2–1	(Israel) Maccabi Tel Aviv
Behrens 30'; Grgić 54' (pen.)	Report	Shahar 47'

Lugano Arena, Lugano
Attendance: 3,435
Referee: Miloš Milanović (Serbia)
27 August 2026
18:00 (20:00 UTC+4)

Maccabi Tel Aviv (Israel)	1–1	(Switzerland) Lugano
Peretz 69' (pen.)	Report	Moncada 79'

Adjarabet Arena, Batumi, Georgia
Attendance: 816
Referee: Jérémie Pignard (France)

Lugano won 3–2 on aggregate.
