= AIL Arena =

Football stadium in Lugano, Switzerland

- Interactive map of AIL Arena
- Location: Lugano, Switzerland
- Owner: Municipality of Lugano
- Capacity: 8,093
- Field size: 105×68 m

Construction
- Opened: 5 June 2026
- Architects: Sandra Giraudi and Thomas Radczuweit
- Structural engineer: Fürst Laffranchi
- General contractor: HRS Real Estate

Tenant
- FC Lugano (2026–present)

AIL Arena is a football stadium in Lugano, Switzerland. It is the home of FC Lugano. The stadium is able to hold 8,093 people and was built from 2023 to 2026 right next to the Cornaredo Stadium which it replaced. In UEFA competitions, it is known by the unsponsored name Lugano Arena.

== Construction ==
On 12 March 2013, the Lugano municipality chose from ten designs, and opted for the one by architects Sandra Giraudi and Thomas Radczuweit, for the firm Cruz y Ortiz. Engineering was by Fürst Laffranchi.

The plans for the stadium included a sports and events centre (Italian: Polo sportivo e degli eventi; PSE), including four nine-storey residential buildings, a service block, and two office towers. The Movement for Socialism, opposing these details of the plan, campaigned for a referendum. On 28 November 2021, the referendum approved the full plans, with 56.81% voting in favour.

In July 2024, the naming rights of the stadium were awarded to Aziende industriali di Lugano, a municipally-owned utilities company. The logo of the stadium was unveiled; designed by Hug & Dorfmüller Design AG, it incorporates the V-shape on the club's jerseys.

In August 2025, the municipality and FC Lugano reached a leasing deal, in which the club would pay the local government 400,000 CHF per year, and half if relegated to the Swiss Challenge League. The deal is indefinite, and can be terminated at the end of June 2035 or at a point every five years from then. Contractors HRS Real Estate transferred ownership to the municipality in March 2026.

== Events ==
The stadium's first match on 5 June 2026 was a 2027 FIFA Women's World Cup qualification match between Switzerland and Malta. Maddalena Buila of the local Corriere del Ticino considered it a milestone that a women's match was inaugurating a stadium. The Swiss won 6–1 in front of 7,500 spectators, with Sydney Schertenleib scoring the first goal after eight minutes.
