= Daniel Dos Santos (footballer) =

Swiss-Portuguese footballer

Personal information
- Full name: Daniel Dos Santos Correia
- Date of birth: 29 December 2002 (age 23)
- Place of birth: Covilhã, Portugal
- Height: 1.79 m (5 ft 10 in)
- Position: Midfielder

Team information
- Current team: Lugano
- Number: 27

Youth career
- Interlaken
- 2014–2021: Thun

Senior career*
Years	Team	Apps	(Gls)
2021–2024	Thun	101	(23)
2024–	Lugano	69	(6)

International career
2022–2023	Switzerland U20	3	(1)
2023–2024	Switzerland U21	10	(1)
- * Club domestic league appearances and goals as of 28 September 2026

Daniel Dos Santos Correia (born 29 December 2002) is a footballer who plays as a midfielder for Swiss club FC Lugano. Born in Portugal, he represented Switzerland up to under-21 level.

== Club career ==
=== Thun ===
Born in Covilhã in the Castelo Branco District of Portugal, Dos Santos was raised in Switzerland from the age of six months, as his father was already working in the Alpine country. He grew up in Interlaken in the Canton of Bern. He began playing for FC Interlaken before moving into the youth ranks of FC Thun when he was 11; his parents drove him 30 kilometres each way to Thun before he could take the bus or train by himself.

Dos Santos made his senior debut for FC Thun on 12 February 2021 in the Swiss Challenge League. He was elected the league's Player of the Season for 2023–24, with 10 goals and 9 assists as his team finished runners-up to FC Sion. He was also chosen as the league's best player of the calendar year 2023. In May 2024, his team missed out on promotion to the Swiss Super League after losing a playoff to Grasshopper Club Zurich.

=== Lugano ===
In June 2024, Dos Santos signed a four-year contract at Super League club FC Lugano, for an estimated fee of 1 million Swiss francs. He scored his first goal for the club on 14 September in the second round of the Swiss Cup away to FC Rapperswil-Jona of the third-tier Swiss Promotion League, in a 3–1 win. On 3 October he netted his first European goal, coming off the bench to conclude a 3–0 home win over Helsingin Jalkapalloklubi in the league phase of the UEFA Conference League; Adrian Horn of the Berner Zeitung commented that only Dos Santos would remember the match, which drew only 932 spectators on a cold and wet evening.

== International career ==
Dos Santos was called up to Portugal under-15 in 2016 but opted to represent Switzerland, the country with which he has dual nationality. He has represented his adopted nation at under-20 and under-21 level, and in 2022 Swiss online newspaper Watson listed him as a candidate for the senior team's first player from the Portuguese community. On 21 November 2023, he scored his first goal for the under-21 team, the late equaliser in a 2–2 draw with Romania in 2025 UEFA European Under-21 Championship qualification in Neuchâtel.

== Personal life ==
Dos Santos is a fan of Portuguese clubs S.L. Benfica and S.C. Covilhã.
