= Dereck Moncada =

Honduran footballer (born 2007)

Personal information
- Full name: Dereck Alessandro Moncada Arguijo
- Date of birth: 30 November 2007 (age 18)
- Place of birth: Talanga, Honduras
- Height: 1.79 m (5 ft 10 in)
- Position: Right winger

Team information
- Current team: Lugano
- Number: 30

Youth career
- 2017: Talanga FC
- 2017–2024: Olimpia

Senior career*
Years	Team	Apps	(Gls)
2024–2026	Olimpia	36	(7)
2026	Necaxa	0	(0)
2026	→ Inter Bogotá (loan)	15	(5)
2026–	Lugano	10	(5)

International career^{‡}
2024	Honduras U20	4	(1)
2025–	Honduras	10	(2)
- * Club domestic league appearances and goals as of 26 October 2026 ‡ National team caps and goals as of 17 November 2026

Dereck Alessandro Moncada Arguijo (born 30 November 2007) is a Honduran professional footballer who plays as a right winger for Swiss Super League club Lugano and the Honduras national team.

== Club career ==
Born in Talanga, Honduras, Moncada made his debut for Olimpia in the Liga Nacional de Fútbol de Honduras at the age of 16, coming off the bench in a 4–0 away win against Vida, on 1 February 2024. His first goal for Los Leones came against Real Sociedad in a league encounter on 6 April 2025, as he notched his side's only goal in a 1–1 draw at home.

On 18 December 2025, news outlets in Honduras reported that Moncada had signed with Liga MX club Necaxa on a four-year deal, following weeks of speculation that linked Moncada with a move to Major League Soccer. On 13 January 2026, recently rebranded Liga DIMAYOR club Internacional de Bogotá announced the signing of Moncada for the 2026 season. Despite never being officially announced by Nexaca, an official announcement from Inter Bogotá stated that his contract was acquired by the Tylis–Porter group, an American consortium that is co-led by Club Necaxa executive Sam Porter. Moncada made his debut for the club the following 23 January in a home encounter against Cúcuta Deportivo, where he scored the team's first official league goal in a 2–1 win.

On 20 May 2026, Swiss Super League club FC Lugano announced the singing of Moncada on a five-year contract in a deal worth €3 million.

== International career ==
On 11 July 2024, Moncada was called up to the Honduras under-20s for the 2024 CONCACAF U-20 Championship tournament in Mexico. He scored once in three appearances as Honduras went out in the quarter-finals.

On 4 November 2025, Moncada was called up to the senior national team for the remaining 2026 FIFA World Cup qualifying matches against Nicaragua and Costa Rica. He made his debut in the match against Nicaragua, and at 17 years old, made history as the youngest player to appear for Honduras since Amado Guevara in 1994.

== Personal life ==
Moncada is the son of former Honduran national Maynor Figueroa, and from his mother's side is the grandson of former Honduran referee Mario Moncada, as well as great-nephew of former finance minister and presidential candidate Rixi Moncada. He is also the half-brother of Liverpool academy player Keyrol Figueroa.

== Career statistics ==
As of match played 1 July 2026

Appearances and goals by club, season and competition
Club	Season	League			Cup		Continental		Other		Total	
Club	Season	Division	Apps	Goals	Apps	Goals	Apps	Goals	Apps	Goals	Apps	Goals
Olimpia	2023–24	Liga Nacional	4	0	—		—		—		2	0
Olimpia	2024–25	Liga Nacional	10	1	—		—		—		10	1
Olimpia	2025–26	Liga Nacional	22	6	—		2 (Note: Two appearances in CONCACAF Central American Cup)	0	—		24	6
Olimpia	Total		36	7	—		2	0	—		38	7
Inter Bogotá (loan)	2026	Categoría Primera A	15	5	0	0	—		—		15	5
Inter Bogotá (loan)	Total		15	5	0	0	—		—		15	5
Career total			51	12	0	0	2	0	—		53	12

=== International ===
As of match played 17 November 2026

Scores and results list Honduras's goal tally first, score column indicates score after each Moncada goal.

List of international goals scored by Dereck Moncada
No.	Date	Venue	Opponent	Score	Result	Competition
1	25 September 2026	Chelato Uclés National Stadium, Tegucigalpa, Honduras	Suriname	1–1	2–3	2026–27 CONCACAF Nations League A
2	17 November 2026	Al-Sadaqua Walsalam Stadium, Kuwait City, Kuwait	Kuwait	2–0	2–0	Friendly

== Honours ==
Olimpia

- Liga Nacional de Fútbol Profesional de Honduras: 2024 Clausura, 2025 Clausura, 2025 Apertura
