= 2025–26 HNK Hajduk Split season =

Hajduk Split
2025–26 season
- Chairman: Ivan Bilić
- Manager: Gonzalo García
- HNL: 2nd
- Croatian Cup: Quarter-finals
- Conference League: Third qualifying round
- Top goalscorer: League: Michele Šego (13 goals); All: Michele Šego (13 goals)
- Highest home attendance: 32,212 (vs. Dinamo Zagreb) (20 September 2025)
- Lowest home attendance: 10,154 (vs. Osijek) (21 April 2026)
- Average home league attendance: 19,784
Home colours	Away colours	Third colours

The 2025–26 season was the 115th season in Hajduk Split’s history and their thirty-fifth in the HNL.

== First-team squad ==
For details of former players, see List of HNK Hajduk Split players.

As of 17 February 2026

Note: Flags indicate national team as defined under FIFA eligibility rules; some limited exceptions apply. Players may hold more than one non-FIFA nationality.

No.	Pos.	Nation	Player
1	GK	CRO	Ivica Ivušić
4	MF	ALB	Adrion Pajaziti
5	DF	CIV	Ismaël Diallo
6	MF	ESP	Hugo Guillamón
7	MF	AUS	Anthony Kalik
8	MF	CAN	Niko Sigur
9	FW	CRO	Ante Rebić
10	FW	CRO	Marko Livaja (captain)
11	FW	CRO	Michele Šego
14	DF	KOS	Ron Raçi
15	DF	AUT	Dario Marešić
17	DF	CRO	Dario Melnjak
21	MF	USA	Rokas Pukštas

No.	Pos.	Nation	Player
23	MF	CRO	Filip Krovinović (vice-captain)
24	FW	GAM	Abdoulie Sanyang
28	MF	CRO	Roko Brajković
30	MF	ESP	Iker Almena (on loan from Al Qadsiah)
31	DF	CRO	Zvonimir Šarlija
32	DF	CRO	Šimun Hrgović
33	GK	CRO	Toni Silić
34	FW	CRO	Bruno Durdov
36	DF	CRO	Marino Skelin
37	MF	CRO	Noa Skoko
38	DF	CRO	Luka Hodak
44	GK	CRO	Dante Stipica
99	GK	UKR	Davyd Fesyuk

== Competitions ==
=== Overview ===
Competition	First match	Last match	Starting round	Final position	Record							
Competition	First match	Last match	Starting round	Final position	Pld	W	D	L	GF	GA	GD	Win %
SuperSport HNL	3 August 2025	22 May 2026	Matchday 1	2nd	36	20	8	8	61	36	+25	55.56
Croatian Cup	24 September 2025	4 March 2026	First round	Quarter-finals	3	1	1	1	6	4	+2	33.33
Conference League	23 July 2025	14 August 2025	Second qualifying round	Third qualifying round	4	2	1	1	6	6	+0	50.00
Total					43	23	10	10	73	46	+27	53.49

Last updated: 23 May 2026
Source: Soccerway

=== SuperSport HNL ===
==== Classification ====
Pos	Team	Pld	W	D	L	GF	GA	GD	Pts	Qualification or relegation
1	Dinamo Zagreb (C)	36	27	5	4	93	28	+65	86	Qualification to Champions League second qualifying round
2	Hajduk Split	36	20	8	8	61	36	+25	68	Qualification to Europa League first qualifying round (Note: The 2025–26 Croatian Football Cup winners qualified for the Europa League first qualifying round. Since the cup winners (Dinamo Zagreb) qualified based on league position, the Europa League spot was passed to the second-placed team, and the second Conference League spot passed to the fourth-placed team.)
3	Varaždin	36	15	9	12	47	46	+1	54	Qualification to Conference League second qualifying round
4	Rijeka	36	14	11	11	49	36	+13	53	Qualification to Conference League second qualifying round
5	Lokomotiva	36	10	14	12	40	52	−12	44	

Source: SuperSport HNL
Rules for classification: 1) Points; 2) Head-to-head points; 3) Head-to-head goal difference; 4) Head-to-head goals scored (at home if two teams tied); 5) Goal difference; 6) Goals scored; 7) Play-off
(Note: Criteria 2-4 and 7 is only used if deciding champion, teams to international competition or teams for relegation and in that case criteria 6 will not be used).
(C) Champions

==== Results summary ====
Overall								Home						Away					
Pld	W	D	L	GF	GA	GD	Pts	W	D	L	GF	GA	GD	W	D	L	GF	GA	GD
36	20	8	8	61	36	+25	68	12	2	4	33	18	+15	8	6	4	28	18	+10

Last updated: 23 May 2026.
Source: SuperSport HNL

==== Results by round ====
Round	1	2	3	4	5	6	7	8	9	10	11	12	13	14	15	16	17	18	19	20	21	22	23	24	25	26	27	28	29	30	31	32	33	34	35	36
Ground	H	H	H	A	H	A	H	H	A	A	A	A	H	A	H	A	A	H	H	A	H	A	H	A	H	H	A	A	H	A	H	A	H	A	A	H
Result	W	W	W	W	D	L	L	W	W	W	W	D	W	L	D	D	W	W	L	L	W	W	W	D	L	W	W	W	W	D	L	D	W	L	D	W
Position	3	2	2	2	2	2	2	2	2	2	1	1	1	1	2	2	2	2	2	2	2	2	2	2	2	2	2	2	2	2	2	2	2	2	2	2

Updated to match(es) played on 23 May 2026. Source: SuperSport HNL
A = Away; H = Home; W = Win; D = Draw; L = Loss

=== Results by opponent ===
Team	Results				Points
Team	1	2	3	4	Points
Dinamo Zagreb	0–2	1–1	1–3	0–2	1
Gorica	2–0	3–1	0–1	1–0	9
Istra 1961	2–1	3–0	1–2	3–1	9
Lokomotiva	2–0	3–1	2–1	1–1	10
Osijek	2–0	2–0	2–0	0–1	9
Rijeka	2–2	0–5	1–0	0–0	5
Slaven Belupo	3–0	0–0	2–0	2–2	8
Varaždin	0–2	1–1	1–1	3–1	5
Vukovar 1991	1–0	2–1	6–0	6–3	12

Source: 2025–26 Croatian Football League article

== Matches ==
=== Friendlies ===
==== Pre-season ====
30 June 2025 Friendly	CSKA Sofia (Bulgaria)	0–1	(Croatia) Hajduk Split	Radomlje, Slovenia
17:30		Report	Livaja 5'; Pukštas (yellow card) 90+5'	Stadium: Sports park Radomlje; Attendance: 0 Referee: Rade Obrenović

4 July 2025 Friendly	Radomlje (Slovenia)	0–1 (Note: The first half lasted 60 minutes, the second half lasted 45 minutes.)	(Croatia) Hajduk Split	Radomlje, Slovenia
17:30		Report	Šego 48'; Mlačić (yellow card) 71'	Stadium: Sports park Radomlje; Attendance: 0 Referee: Jure Žagar

12 July 2025 Friendly	Posušje (Bosnia and Herzegovina)	0–1	(Croatia) Hajduk Split	Posušje, Bosnia and Herzegovina
20:45		Report	Livaja 14'	Stadium: Mokri Dolac Stadium; Attendance: 5,000

15 July 2025 Friendly	Hajduk Split	4–1	Croatia Zmijavci	Split, Croatia
18:30	Kalik 27'; Skoko 66'; Livaja 69'; Šarlija 74'	Report	Vukušić 38'	Stadium: Stadion Poljud (training ground); Attendance: 0 Referee: Duje Strukan

18 July 2025 Friendly	LASK (Austria)	2–1	(Croatia) Hajduk Split	Linz, Austria
19:00	Adeniran 8', 90+2'	Report	Livaja 3'	Stadium: Raiffeisen Arena; Attendance: 4,000

==== On-season (2025) ====
4 September 2025 Friendly	Hajduk Split (Croatia)	3–3	(Bosnia and Herzegovina) Posušje	Split, Croatia
17:30	Šego 73'; Bralić 79'; Skoko 86'	Report	Pavlek 11'; Čuić 19'; Kreković 21'	Stadium: Stadion Poljud; Attendance: 0 Referee: Renato Lacić

==== Mid-season ====
11 January 2026 Friendly	Croatia Zmijavci	1–2	Hajduk Split	Zmijavci, Croatia
14:00	B. Brajković 39'; Jukić-Peladić (yellow card) 77'	Report	Hrgović 8'; Raçi (yellow card) 70'; Krovinović 79'	Stadium: ŠRC Marijan Šuto; Attendance: 1,200; Referee: Ante Znaor

14 January 2026 Friendly	Hajduk Split (Croatia)	4–0 (Note: The game was played in 4 quarters of 30 minutes.)	(Bosnia and Herzegovina) Posušje	Split, Croatia
15:00	Šego 2'; Krovinović 25'; Rebić 110'; Čupić (yellow card) 118'; Pajaziti 120'	Report	Braun (yellow card) 23'	Stadium: Stadion Poljud; Attendance: 0 Referee: Ante Terzić

17 January 2026 Friendly	Hajduk Split (Croatia)	2–0	(Bosnia and Herzegovina) Široki Brijeg	Split, Croatia
15:00	Šego 56'; Ugwuodo 90'	Report		Stadium: Stadion Poljud; Attendance: 0 Referee: Renato Lacić

=== SuperSport HNL ===
3 August 2025 1	Hajduk Split	2–1	Istra 1961	Split
21:00 CEST (UTC+02:00)	Benrahou 45+1' (pen.); Kalik (yellow card) 53'; Karačić 86'	Report	Maurić (yellow card) 42'; Prevljak 48'	Stadium: Stadion Poljud; Attendance: 25,501; Referee: Patrik Kolarić (Čakovec)

10 August 2025 2	Hajduk Split	2–0	Gorica	Split
21:00 CEST (UTC+02:00)	Pajaziti (yellow card) 22'; Benrahou 52' (pen.); Šego 62' (pen.)	Report	Pozo (yellow card) 44'; Duraković (red card) 50'	Stadium: Stadion Poljud; Attendance: 25,302; Referee: Dario Bel (Osijek)

17 August 2025 3	Hajduk Split	3–0	Slaven Belupo	Split
21:00 CEST (UTC+02:00)	Sanyang 69', 87'; Pukštas (yellow card) 74' (goal) 78'	Report	Mitrović (yellow card) 74'; Katalinić (yellow card) 77'	Stadium: Stadion Poljud; Attendance: 23,635; Referee: Mateo Erceg (Benkovac)

24 August 2025 4	Osijek	0–2	Hajduk Split	Osijek
18:30 CEST (UTC+02:00)		Report	Livaja 11' (yellow card) 63'; Šego 66'; Ivušić (yellow card) 87'; Pajaziti (yellow card) 90'	Stadium: Opus Arena; Attendance: 11,383; Referee: Patrik Pavlešić (Duga Resa)

31 August 2025 5	Hajduk Split	2–2	Rijeka	Split
21:00 CEST (UTC+02:00)	Pukštas 42', 90+5'; Pajaziti (yellow card) 70'	Report	Menalo (yellow card) 18' (goal) 21'; Butić (yellow card) 35'; Dantas (yellow card) 39'; Devetak (yellow card) 45+5'; Janković (yellow card) 53'; Bogojević 55'; Radeljić (yellow card) 74'	Stadium: Stadion Poljud; Attendance: 29,112; Referee: Dario Bel (Osijek)

13 September 2025 6	Varaždin	2–0	Hajduk Split	Varaždin
17:00 CEST (UTC+02:00)	Latković 5'; Ivušić 8' (o.g.)	Report	Raçi (yellow card) 17'; Karačić (yellow card) 47'; Pukštas (yellow card) 71'	Stadium: Stadion Varteks; Attendance: 10,366; Referee: Patrik Kolarić (Čakovec)

20 September 2025 7	Hajduk Split	0–2	Dinamo Zagreb	Split
17:00 CEST (UTC+02:00)		Report	Hoxha 44' (yellow card) 83'; Lisica (yellow card) 45+2'; Mišić (yellow card) 58'; Bakrar 80'	Stadium: Stadion Poljud; Attendance: 32,212; Referee: Mateo Erceg (Benkovac)

27 September 2025 8	Hajduk Split	2–0	Lokomotiva	Split
18:45 CEST (UTC+02:00)	Rebić 18'; Guillamón (yellow card) 57'; Kalik 85'; Raçi (yellow card) 88'	Report	Vuković (yellow card) 57'; Katić (yellow card) 62'; Kolinger (yellow card) 81'	Stadium: Stadion Poljud; Attendance: 16,768; Referee: Patrik Pavlešić (Duga Resa)

4 October 2025 9	Vukovar 1991	0–1	Hajduk Split	Vinkovci
15:45 CEST (UTC+02:00)	Čaić (red card) 24'; Mejía (yellow card) 45+1'; Pavičić (yellow card) 90'	Report	Pukštas (yellow card) 75' (goal) 77'; Sigur (yellow card) 85'	Stadium: Stadion HNK Cibalia; Attendance: 5,961; Referee: Antonio Melnjak (Rijeka)

19 October 2025 10	Istra 1961	0–3	Hajduk Split	Pula
16:00 CEST (UTC+02:00)	Lončar (yellow card) 42'	Report	Almena 22'; Rebić (yellow card) 39'; Šego 42', 77'; Pajaziti (yellow card) 47'	Stadium: Stadion Aldo Drosina; Attendance: 8,124; Referee: Patrik Kolarić (Čakovec)

24 October 2025 11	Gorica	1–3	Hajduk Split	Velika Gorica
18:00 CEST (UTC+02:00)	Pršir (yellow card) 29'; Pozo (yellow card) 51'; Čuić 76'; Trontelj (yellow card) 90+2'; Vrzić (yellow card) 90+6'	Report	Šarlija 4' (yellow card) 45'; Pukštas (yellow card) 24'; Šego 53' (pen.); Sigur 67'	Stadium: Stadion Radnik; Attendance: 4,707; Referee: Patrik Pavlešić (Duga Resa)

2 November 2025 12	Slaven Belupo	0–0	Hajduk Split	Koprivnica
16:00 CET (UTC+01:00)	Šuto (yellow card) 33'; Agbekpornu (yellow card) 33'; Filipović (red card) 81'; Čović (yellow card) 90+3'; Krušelj (yellow card) 90+5'	Report	Hodak (yellow card) 13'	Stadium: Gradski Stadion Ivan Kušek Apaš; Attendance: 3,077; Referee: Ante Čulina (Zagreb)

8 November 2025 13	Hajduk Split	2–0	Osijek	Split
17:45 CET (UTC+01:00)	Krovinović 5'; Rebić (yellow card) 61'; Šego 90+4'	Report	Jurišić (yellow card) 45' (yellow-red card) 65'; Jakupović (yellow card) 74'; Jelenić (yellow card) 90+6'	Stadium: Stadion Poljud; Attendance: 22,564; Referee: Patrik Pavlešić (Duga Resa)

22 November 2025 14	Rijeka	5–0	Hajduk Split	Rijeka
18:00 CET (UTC+01:00)	Fruk 5', 22', 32'; Vignato 51'; Menalo 86'	Report		Stadium: Stadion Rujevica; Attendance: 6,554; Referee: Mateo Erceg (Benkovac)

29 November 2025 15	Hajduk Split	1–1	Varaždin	Split
15:30 CET (UTC+01:00)	Šego (yellow card) 31' (goal) 54'; Livaja (yellow card) 90'	Report	Boršić (yellow card) 36' (yellow-red card) 69'; Jovanov (yellow card) 38'; Duvnjak 44'	Stadium: Stadion Poljud; Attendance: 17,202; Referee: Dario Bel (Osijek)

6 December 2025 16	Dinamo Zagreb	1–1	Hajduk Split	Zagreb
15:00 CET (UTC+01:00)	Bennacer (yellow card) 9'; Mišić (yellow card) 87'; Kulenović (yellow card) 90+7'; Pierre-Gabriel (yellow card) 90+10'; Hoxha 90+12'; Mikić (yellow card) 90+15'; McKenna (yellow card) 90+18'	Report	Sigur (yellow card) 28'; Šarlija (yellow card) 42'; Rebić (yellow card) 45+2'; Šego 68' (yellow card) 90+1'; Pajaziti (yellow card) 77'; Kalik (yellow card) 87'; Guillamón (yellow card) 89'; Mlačić (yellow card) 90+4'; Lučić (yellow card) 90+10'; Raçi (yellow card) 90+16'	Stadium: Stadion Maksimir; Attendance: 17,028; Referee: Patrik Kolarić (Čakovec)

13 December 2025 17	Lokomotiva	1–3	Hajduk Split	Zagreb
17:45 CET (UTC+01:00)	Stojaković 12' (yellow card) 80'; Diop (yellow card) 38'; Katić (yellow card) 42'; Bošković (yellow card) 58'	Report	Sanyang (yellow card) 23'; Rebić 27', 73'; Šego 54'; Šarlija (yellow card) 90+2'	Stadium: Stadion Maksimir; Attendance: 2,813; Referee: Mateo Erceg (Benkovac)

21 December 2025 18	Hajduk Split	2–1	Vukovar 1991	Split
15:00 CET (UTC+01:00)	Šego 7'; Rebić (yellow card) 27' (yellow-red card) 74'; Durdov (yellow card) 38'; Livaja 70' (yellow card) 70' (yellow-red card) 77'	Report	Pavičić (yellow card) 24'; Tadić (red card) 30'; Čabrajić (yellow card) 52'; Puljić 61'; Jurilj (yellow card) 72'; González (yellow card) 82'; Čaić (yellow card) 90+4'	Stadium: Stadion Poljud; Attendance: 21,212; Referee: Zdenko Lovrić (Đakovo)

25 January 2026 19	Hajduk Split	1–2	Istra 1961	Split
15:00 CET (UTC+01:00)	Mlačić (yellow card) 29'; Sanyang (yellow card) 62'; Róbertsson 83' (o.g.); Šarlija (yellow card) 87'; Skelin (yellow card) 90+6'	Report	Prevljak 10'; Frederiksen 22'; Rozić (yellow card) 26'; Nasraoui (yellow card) 51'	Stadium: Stadion Poljud; Attendance: 11,925; Referee: Mateo Erceg (Benkovac)

31 January 2026 20	Gorica	1–0	Hajduk Split	Velika Gorica
15:00 CET (UTC+01:00)	Pozo 44'; Matijaš (yellow card) 86'; Čuić (yellow card) 90+2'	Report	Šarlija (yellow card) 90+2'	Stadium: Stadion Radnik; Attendance: 3,889; Referee: Ante Čulina (Zagreb)

7 February 2026 21	Hajduk Split	2–0	Slaven Belupo	Split
17:15 CET (UTC+01:00)	Pukštas 7' (yellow card) 74'; Brajković 23'	Report	Jakir (yellow card) 5'; Kovačić (yellow card) 47'; Nestorovski (yellow card) 56'; Božić (yellow card) 68'	Stadium: Stadion Poljud; Attendance: 14,038; Referee: Patrik Kolarić (Čakovec)

15 February 2026 22	Osijek	0–2	Hajduk Split	Osijek
17:45 CET (UTC+01:00)	Bubanja (yellow card) 45+1'; Jelenić (yellow card) 73'; Omerović (yellow card) 90+3'	Report	Livaja 15' (pen.); Šarlija (yellow card) 33'; Rebić (yellow card) 40'; Pukštas 77'	Stadium: Opus Arena; Attendance: 7,248; Referee: Ante Čulina (Zagreb)

22 February 2026 23	Hajduk Split	1–0	Rijeka	Split
17:45 CET (UTC+01:00)	Šego (yellow card) 14'; Livaja 79'; Sigur (red card) 80'; Hodak (yellow card) 90+3'	Report	Adu-Adjei (yellow card) 20'; Petrovič (red card) 45'; Oreč (yellow card) 90+5'	Stadium: Stadion Poljud; Attendance: 23,542; Referee: Dario Bel (Osijek)

28 February 2026 24	Varaždin	1–1	Hajduk Split	Varaždin
17:45 CET (UTC+01:00)	Tavares 40'; Lesjak (yellow card) 50'; Mladenovski (yellow card) 81' (yellow-red card) 84'	Report	Rebić 23'; Hodak (yellow card) 73'	Stadium: Stadion Varteks; Attendance: 8,177; Referee: Ante Čulina (Zagreb)

8 March 2026 25	Hajduk Split	1–3	Dinamo Zagreb	Split
15:00 CET (UTC+01:00)	Pukštas 28'; Guillamón (yellow card) 30'	Report	Zajc 7'; Vidović 11'; Bakrar 38' (yellow card) 48'; Mišić (yellow card) 53'; Topić (yellow card) 90+2'	Stadium: Stadion Poljud; Attendance: 31,030; Referee: Mateo Erceg (Benkovac)

15 March 2026 26	Hajduk Split	2–1	Lokomotiva	Split
15:00 CET (UTC+01:00)	Livaja 22'; Rebić 33'; Šarlija (yellow card) 59'	Report	Sabra 62'; Vasilj (yellow card) 81'	Stadium: Stadion Poljud; Attendance: 13,539; Referee: Patrik Pavlešić (Duga Resa)

21 March 2026 27	Vukovar 1991	0–6	Hajduk Split	Osijek
15:00 CET (UTC+01:00)		Report	Livaja 6' (pen.); Marešić (yellow card) 19'; Brajković 34'; Rebić 47'; Pukštas 64'; Šego 84'; Vlasenko 89' (o.g.)	Stadium: Stadion Gradski vrt Attendance: 4,355; Referee: Dario Bel (Osijek)

7 April 2026 28	Istra 1961	1–3	Hajduk Split	Pula
18:00 CEST (UTC+02:00)	Kadušić (yellow card) 10'; Frederiksen (yellow card) 49'; Agada 84'	Report	Livaja 23', 58' (yellow card) 34'; Pajaziti 51'; Sanyang (yellow card) 86'	Stadium: Stadion Aldo Drosina; Attendance: 6,028; Referee: Mateo Erceg (Benkovac)

12 April 2026 29	Hajduk Split	1–0	Gorica	Split
18:30 CEST (UTC+02:00)	Livaja 4'	Report	Sule (yellow card) 17'; Pavičić (yellow card) 53'; Pršir (yellow card) 65'	Stadium: Stadion Poljud; Attendance: 14,758; Referee: Ivan Vukančić (Benkovac)

17 April 2026 30	Slaven Belupo	2–2	Hajduk Split	Koprivnica
17:45 CEST (UTC+02:00)	Dabro 4'; Ćubelić 53'; Mitrović (yellow card) 73'	Report	Rebić 38'; Livaja (yellow card) 46'; Božić 63' (o.g.); Pajaziti (yellow card) 80'	Stadium: Gradski Stadion Ivan Kušek Apaš; Attendance: 2,713; Referee: Patrik Kolarić (Čakovec)

21 April 2026 31	Hajduk Split	0–1	Osijek	Split
18:45 CEST (UTC+02:00)	Šego (yellow card) 16' (penalty missed) 83'	Report	Bubanja 56'; Čolina (yellow card) 87'; Vrbančić (yellow card) 90+1'	Stadium: Stadion Poljud; Attendance: 10,154; Referee: Igor Pajač (Sv. Ivan Zelina)

26 April 2026 32	Rijeka	0–0	Hajduk Split	Rijeka
16:00 CEST (UTC+02:00)	Barco (yellow card) 67'	Report	Raçi (yellow card) 25'; Pukštas (yellow card) 73'; Almena (yellow card) 85'; Brajković (yellow card) 86'	Stadium: Stadion Rujevica; Attendance: 7,665; Referee: Ante Čulina (Zagreb)

3 May 2026 33	Hajduk Split	3–1	Varaždin	Split
18:45 CEST (UTC+02:00)	Sigur (yellow card) 8'; Brajković (yellow card) 18'; Lesjak 27' (o.g.); Šarlija (yellow card) 30'; Pukštas 45+1'; Sanyang 90+6'	Report	Latković 21'; Mladenovski (red card) 90+3'; Canjuga (yellow card)	Stadium: Stadion Poljud; Attendance: 12,258; Referee: Patrik Kolarić (Čakovec)

9 May 2026 34	Dinamo Zagreb	2–0	Hajduk Split	Zagreb
16:00 CEST (UTC+02:00)	Bakrar (yellow card) 15' (goal) 22'; Goda (yellow card) 32'; Beljo 65'	Report	Sigur (yellow card) 58'; Rebić (yellow card) 86'	Stadium: Stadion Maksimir; Attendance: 21,942; Referee: Patrik Pavlešić (Duga Resa)

16 May 2026 35	Lokomotiva	1–1	Hajduk Split	Zagreb
18:15 CEST (UTC+02:00)	Vasilj 18'	Report	Almena 4'; Livaja (yellow card) 40' (penalty missed) 61'	Stadium: Stadion Maksimir; Attendance: 960; Referee: Antonio Škobić (Osijek)

22 May 2026 36	Hajduk Split	6–3	Vukovar 1991	Split
18:15 CEST (UTC+02:00)	Brajković 9'; Šego 16', 26'; Banovec 55' (o.g.); Huram 56'; Almena 67' (pen.); Guillamón (yellow card) 89'	Report	Banovec 2'; Gurlica 19'; Biljan (yellow card) 53'; Puljić 90+1' (pen.)	Stadium: Stadion Poljud; Attendance: 11,355; Referee: Patrik Kolarić (Čakovec)

=== Croatian Football Cup ===
24 September 2025 R1	Koprivnica	1–4	Hajduk Split	Koprivnica
17:00 CEST (UTC+02:00)	Riđan (red card) 18'; Lešković (yellow card) 30'; Bošnjak (yellow card) 33'; Srbljinović 64'	Report	Livaja 13', 85'; Almena 59'; Melnjak 90'	Stadium: Gradski Stadion Ivan Kušek Apaš; Attendance: 1,800; Referee: Filip Cindrić (Nova Kapela)

29 October 2025 R2	Cibalia	0–0 (a.e.t.) (2–4 p)	Hajduk Split	Vinkovci
15:30 CET (UTC+01:00)	Stapić (yellow card) 44'; Rubić (yellow card) 49'; Mišić (yellow card) 110'	Report	Kalik (yellow card) 44'; Sanyang (yellow card) 82'; Šarlija (yellow card) 95'; Durdov (yellow card) 98'; Guillamón (yellow card) 115'; Silić (yellow card)	Stadium: Stadion HNK Cibalia; Attendance: 5,216; Referee: Ivan Vukančić (Benkovac)
	Penalties
	Boban (penalty scored); Mišić (penalty missed); Sopić (penalty missed); Vukić (penalty scored)		Šego (penalty scored); Pukštas (penalty scored); Durdov (penalty scored); Almena (penalty missed); Guillamón (penalty scored)

4 March 2026 QF	Rijeka	3–2	Hajduk Split	Rijeka
20:00 CET (UTC+01:00)	Fruk (yellow card) 8' (penalty missed) 90+19' 90+19'; Devetak (yellow card) 27'; Dantas (yellow card) 45+5' (goal) 57' (pen.); Rukavina 90+20'	Report	Raçi (yellow card) 18'; Rebić (yellow card) 19'; Pukštas 25'; Skelin (yellow card) 50'; Šego (yellow card) 52'; Guillamón (yellow card) 90+2'; Brajković 90+5'; Pajaziti (red card) 90+21'	Stadium: Stadion Rujevica; Attendance: 7,355; Referee: Patrik Kolarić (Čakovec)

=== UEFA Conference League ===
==== Second qualifying round ====
23 July 2025 First leg	Zira (Azerbaijan)	1–1	(Croatia) Hajduk Split	Baku, Azerbaijan
19:30 AZT (UTC+04:00)	Konaté 31'; Guima (yellow card) 47'	Report	Šarlija (yellow card) 35'; Capan (yellow card) 45+1'; Kalik 68'; Benrahou (yellow card) 88'	Stadium: Neftçi Arena; Attendance: 5,232; Referee: Christos Vergetis (Greece)

31 July 2025 Second leg	Hajduk Split (Croatia)	2–1 (a.e.t.) (3–2 agg.)	(Azerbaijan) Zira	Split, Croatia
21:00 CEST (UTC+02:00)	Pajaziti (yellow card) 17'; Krovinović 19'; Mlačić (yellow card) 56'; Benrahou 95'	Report	Guima (yellow card) 27' (yellow-red card) 77'; Gomis (yellow card) 64'; Djibrilla 90+3'; Acka (yellow card) 110'; Alıyev (yellow card) 110'	Stadium: Stadion Poljud; Attendance: 30,086; Referee: Luca Pairetto (Italy)

==== Third qualifying round ====
7 August 2025 First leg	Hajduk Split (Croatia)	2–1	(Albania) Dinamo City	Split, Croatia
21:00 CEST (UTC+02:00)	Šarlija (yellow card) 45+3'; Durdov 49'; Sanyang 63'	Report	Bregu 37'; Meksi (yellow card) 61'; Berisha (yellow card) 86'	Stadium: Stadion Poljud; Attendance: 31,652; Referee: Sayat Karabayev (Kazakhstan)

14 August 2025 Second leg	Dinamo City (Albania)	3–1 (a.e.t.) (4–3 agg.)	(Croatia) Hajduk Split	Tirana, Albania
20:45 CEST (UTC+02:00)	Zabërgja 14' (yellow card) 18'; Qardaku (yellow card) 90' (goal) 109'; Aliji (yellow card) 105+3'; Dita (yellow card) 107'; Berisha 111'	Report	Sanyang (yellow card) 22' (yellow-red card) 78'; Kalik (yellow card) 58'; Karačić 99'; Ivušić (yellow card) 105'; Rebić (yellow card) 105+2'; Silić (yellow card) 113'	Stadium: Arena Kombëtare; Attendance: 5,227; Referee: Denys Shurman (Ukraine)

== Player seasonal records ==
Updated 21 June 2026

=== Goals ===
Rank	Name	League	Europe	Cup	Total
1	(Croatia) Michele Šego	13	–	–	13
2	(Croatia) Marko Livaja	9	–	2	11
3	(United States) Rokas Pukštas	9	–	1	10
4	(Croatia) Ante Rebić	7	–	–	7
5	(The Gambia) Abdoulie Sanyang	3	1	–	4
5	(Spain) Iker Almena	3	–	1	4
5	(Croatia) Roko Brajković	3	–	1	4
8	(Morocco) Yassine Benrahou	2	1	–	3
9	(Australia) Anthony Kalik	1	1	–	2
9	(Australia) Fran Karačić	1	1	–	2
9	(Croatia) Filip Krovinović	1	1	–	2
12	(Ukraine) Adam Huram	1	–	–	1
12	(Albania) Adrion Pajaziti	1	–	–	1
12	(Canada) Niko Sigur	1	–	–	1
12	(Croatia) Zvonimir Šarlija	1	–	–	1
12	(Croatia) Bruno Durdov	–	1	–	1
12	(Croatia) Dario Melnjak	–	–	1	1
Own goals		5	–	–	5
TOTALS		61	6	6	73

Source: Competitive matches

=== Clean sheets ===
Rank	Name	League	Europe	Cup	Total
1	(Croatia) Ivica Ivušić	8	–	–	8
2	(Croatia) Toni Silić	6	–	1	7
TOTALS		14	0	1	15

Source: Competitive matches

=== Disciplinary record ===
Number	Position	Player	HNL			Conference League			Croatian Cup			Total		
Number	Position	Player	Yellow card	(yellow card) (yellow-red card)	Red card	Yellow card	(yellow card) (yellow-red card)	Red card	Yellow card	(yellow card) (yellow-red card)	Red card	Yellow card	(yellow card) (yellow-red card)	Red card
1	GK	(Croatia) Ivica Ivušić	1	0	0	1	0	0	0	0	0	2	0	0
4	MF	(Albania) Adrion Pajaziti	6	0	0	1	0	0	0	0	1	7	0	1
6	MF	(Spain) Hugo Guillamón	4	0	0	0	0	0	2	0	0	6	0	0
7	MF	(Australia) Anthony Kalik	2	0	0	1	0	0	1	0	0	4	0	0
8	MF	(Canada) Niko Sigur	4	0	1	0	0	0	0	0	0	4	0	1
9	FW	(Croatia) Ante Rebić	5	1	0	1	0	0	1	0	0	7	1	0
10	FW	(Croatia) Marko Livaja	5	1	0	0	0	0	0	0	0	5	1	0
11	FW	(Croatia) Michele Šego	4	0	0	0	0	0	1	0	0	5	0	0
13	GK	(Austria) Ivan Lučić	1	0	0	0	0	0	0	0	0	1	0	0
14	DF	(Kosovo) Ron Raçi	4	0	0	0	0	0	1	0	0	5	0	0
15	DF	(Austria) Dario Marešić	1	0	0	0	0	0	0	0	0	1	0	0
21	MF	(United States) Rokas Pukštas	6	0	0	0	0	0	0	0	0	6	0	0
22	DF	(Croatia) Branimir Mlačić	2	0	0	1	0	0	0	0	0	3	0	0
24	FW	(The Gambia) Abdoulie Sanyang	3	0	0	0	1	0	1	0	0	4	1	0
26	MF	(Croatia) Marko Capan	0	0	0	1	0	0	0	0	0	1	0	0
28	FW	(Croatia) Roko Brajković	2	0	0	0	0	0	0	0	0	2	0	0
29	DF	(Australia) Fran Karačić	1	0	0	0	0	0	0	0	0	1	0	0
30	MF	(Spain) Iker Almena	1	0	0	0	0	0	0	0	0	1	0	0
31	DF	(Croatia) Zvonimir Šarlija	9	0	0	2	0	0	1	0	0	12	0	0
33	GK	(Croatia) Toni Silić	0	0	0	1	0	0	1	0	0	2	0	0
34	FW	(Croatia) Bruno Durdov	1	0	0	0	0	0	1	0	0	2	0	0
36	DF	(Croatia) Marino Skelin	1	0	0	0	0	0	1	0	0	2	0	0
38	DF	(Croatia) Luka Hodak	3	0	0	0	0	0	0	0	0	3	0	0
45	MF	(Morocco) Yassine Benrahou	0	0	0	1	0	0	0	0	0	1	0	0
TOTALS			66	2	1	10	1	0	11	0	1	87	3	2

=== Appearances and goals ===
Number	Position	Player	Apps	Goals	Apps	Goals	Apps	Goals	Apps	Goals
Number	Position	Player	Total		HNL (Note: First number represents appearances in starting eleven, while the second number indicates a substitute appearance.)		Conference League		Croatian Cup	
1	GK	(Croatia) Ivica Ivušić	19	0	15+0	0	4+0	0	0+0	0
3	DF	(Croatia) Roko Gabrić	3	0	1+2	0	0+0	0	0+0	0
3	DF	(Spain) Edgar González	8	0	4+2	0	0+0	0	2+0	0
4	MF	(Albania) Adrion Pajaziti	38	1	23+8	1	3+1	0	3+0	0
5	DF	(Ivory Coast) Ismaël Diallo	2	0	0+1	0	0+1	0	0+0	0
6	MF	(Spain) Hugo Guillamón	26	0	15+8	0	0+0	0	2+1	0
7	MF	(Australia) Anthony Kalik	24	2	1+16	1	4+0	1	2+1	0
8	MF	(Canada) Niko Sigur	35	1	24+5	1	1+3	0	2+0	0
9	FW	(Croatia) Ante Rebić	30	7	22+4	7	0+2	0	2+0	0
10	FW	(Croatia) Marko Livaja	32	11	19+7	9	4+0	0	1+1	2
11	FW	(Croatia) Michele Šego	36	13	23+9	13	0+2	0	1+1	0
14	DF	(Kosovo) Ron Raçi	19	0	15+3	0	0+0	0	1+0	0
15	DF	(Austria) Dario Marešić	14	0	13+1	0	0+0	0	0+0	0
17	DF	(Croatia) Dario Melnjak	26	1	8+14	0	0+2	0	1+1	1
21	MF	(United States) Rokas Pukštas	36	10	27+4	9	0+2	0	2+1	1
22	DF	(Croatia) Branimir Mlačić	19	0	14+1	0	3+0	0	1+0	0
23	MF	(Croatia) Filip Krovinović	36	2	24+5	1	4+0	1	0+3	0
24	FW	(The Gambia) Abdoulie Sanyang	29	4	8+18	3	1+1	1	1+0	0
26	MF	(Croatia) Marko Capan	1	0	0+0	0	1+0	0	0+0	0
26	FW	(Ukraine) Adam Huram	7	1	1+6	1	0+0	0	0+0	0
28	FW	(Croatia) Roko Brajković	28	4	16+5	3	4+0	0	1+2	1
29	DF	(Australia) Fran Karačić	17	2	7+4	1	3+1	1	1+1	0
30	MF	(Spain) Iker Almena	23	4	18+3	3	0+0	0	2+0	1
31	DF	(Croatia) Zvonimir Šarlija	33	1	26+1	1	4+0	0	1+1	0
32	DF	(Croatia) Šimun Hrgović	36	0	27+2	0	4+0	0	2+1	0
33	GK	(Croatia) Toni Silić	24	0	21+0	0	0+0	0	3+0	0
34	FW	(Croatia) Bruno Durdov	20	1	3+13	0	1+2	1	0+1	0
36	DF	(Croatia) Marino Skelin	6	0	3+1	0	1+0	0	1+0	0
37	MF	(Croatia) Noa Skoko	12	0	4+6	0	2+0	0	0+0	0
38	DF	(Croatia) Luka Hodak	17	0	11+5	0	0+0	0	1+0	0
39	MF	(Ukraine) Illia Kutia	1	0	0+1	0	0+0	0	0+0	0
45	MF	(Morocco) Yassine Benrahou	8	3	3+1	2	0+4	1	0+0	0

== Transfers ==
=== In ===
Date	Position	Player	From	Fee
18 June 2025	FW	(Croatia) Dominik Babić	(Croatia) Osijek	Free
30 June 2025	DF	(Croatia) Zvonimir Šarlija	(Cyprus) Pafos	Loan ended
30 June 2025	DF	(Croatia) Luka Vušković	(Belgium) Westerlo	Loan ended
30 June 2025	MF	(Morocco) Yassine Benrahou	(France) Caen	Loan ended
30 June 2025	MF	(Croatia) Luka Jurak	(Slovenia) Mura	Loan ended
8 July 2025	DF	(Australia) Fran Karačić	(Croatia) Lokomotiva Zagreb	€200,000
8 July 2025	MF	(Albania) Adrion Pajaziti	(England) Fulham	Free
14 July 2025	GK	(Croatia) Ivica Ivušić	(Cyprus) Pafos	€800,000
26 July 2025	DF	(Kosovo) Ron Raçi	(Kosovo) Prishtina	€300,000
1 August 2025	FW	(Croatia) Ante Rebić	(Italy) Lecce	Free
26 August 2025	DF	(Spain) Edgar González	(Spain) Almería	Loan
26 August 2025	MF	(Spain) Hugo Guillamón	(Spain) Valencia	Free
5 September 2025	MF	(Spain) Iker Almena	(Saudi Arabia) Al Qadsiah	Loan
6 January 2026	MF	(Croatia) Mihael Žaper	(Croatia) Lokomotiva Zagreb	Recalled from loan
10 January 2026	GK	(Croatia) Raul Bezeljak	(Slovenia) Jadran Dekani	Loan ended
3 February 2026	GK	(Croatia) Dante Stipica	(Poland) Pogoń Szczecin II	Free
17 February 2026	DF	(Austria) Dario Marešić	(Croatia) Istra 1961	€175,000

Total Spending: ▼€1,475,000

=== Out ===
Date	Position	Player	To	Fee
31 May 2025	DF	(Croatia) Niko Đolonga	(Croatia) Karlovac 1919	End of contract
31 May 2025	DF	(Kosovo) Elvis Letaj	(Kosovo) Ballkani	End of contract
31 May 2025	FW	(North Macedonia) Aleksandar Trajkovski	(Croatia) Lokomotiva Zagreb	End of contract
20 June 2025	DF	(Croatia) Josip Elez	(Croatia) Vukovar 1991	End of contract
1 July 2025	GK	(Croatia) Lovre Kalinić		End of contract
1 July 2025	DF	(Croatia) Luka Vušković	(England) Tottenham Hotspur	€11,000,000
1 July 2025	FW	(Croatia) Stipe Biuk	(Spain) Real Valladolid	Loan ended
1 July 2025	FW	(Slovenia) Jan Mlakar	(Italy) Pisa	Loan ended
1 July 2025	FW	(Ukraine) Nazariy Rusyn	(England) Sunderland	Loan ended
7 July 2025	MF	(Croatia) Ivan Rakitić		Retired
10 July 2025	DF	(Croatia) Dominik Prpić	(Portugal) Porto	€4,500,000
20 July 2025	DF	(Croatia) Ivan Krstanović	Croatia Zmijavci	Loan
20 July 2025	FW	(Croatia) Dominik Babić	Croatia Zmijavci	Loan
2 August 2025	DF	(Croatia) Filip Uremović	(Japan) Kawasaki Frontale	€800,000
27 August 2025	MF	(Croatia) Mihael Žaper	(Croatia) Lokomotiva Zagreb	Loan
29 August 2025	GK	(Croatia) Raul Bezeljak	(Slovenia) Jadran Dekani	Loan
3 September 2025	MF	(Morocco) Yassine Benrahou	(Turkey) Manisa	Free (released)
3 September 2025	MF	(Croatia) Luka Jurak	(Croatia) Uskok	Dual registration
3 September 2025	MF	(Croatia) Noa Skoko	(Croatia) Uskok	Dual registration
3 September 2025	FW	(Croatia) Lovre Lončar	(Croatia) Uskok	Dual registration
9 January 2026	MF	(Croatia) Mihael Žaper	(Slovenia) Radomlje	Loan
10 January 2026	DF	(Spain) Edgar González	(Spain) Almería	Recalled from loan
10 January 2026	DF	(Australia) Fran Karačić	(Croatia) Osijek	Loan
12 January 2026	GK	(Austria) Ivan Lučić	(Poland) Miedź Legnica	Free (released)
12 January 2026	MF	(Croatia) Marko Capan	(Lithuania) Žalgiris	Undisclosed
2 February 2026	DF	(Croatia) Branimir Mlačić	(Italy) Udinese	€4,500,000
17 February 2026	GK	(Croatia) Raul Bezeljak	(Croatia) Sesvete	Free (released)

Total Income: ▲€20,800,000

Total expenditure: ▲€19,325,000

=== Promoted from youth squad ===
Position	Player	Age
DF	(Croatia) Branimir Mlačić	18
DF	(Croatia) Luka Hodak	19
