= Javi Eslava =

Spanish footballer

Personal information
- Full name: Javier Eslava Carrasco
- Date of birth: 14 June 1996 (age 30)
- Place of birth: Barcelona, Spain
- Height: 1.90 m (6 ft 3 in)
- Position: Forward

Team information
- Current team: Ibiza
- Number: 19

Youth career
- Cornellà
- Hospitalet

Senior career*
Years	Team	Apps	(Gls)
2016–2019	Can Vidalet		
2019–2021	Vilassar Mar	45	(5)
2021–2023	Castelldefels	60	(17)
2023–2024	Europa	30	(9)
2024–2025	Mérida	32	(12)
2025–2026	Zamora	17	(3)
2026–	Ibiza	13	(4)
- * Club domestic league appearances and goals as of 10 June 2026

Javier "Javi" Eslava Carrasco (born 14 June 1996) is a Spanish footballer who plays for Primera Federación club Ibiza. Mainly a forward, he can also play as a right winger.

== Career ==
Born in Barcelona, Catalonia, Eslava represented UE Cornellà and CE L'Hospitalet as a youth. In 2016, after finishing his formation, he signed for Segona Catalana side CF Can Vidalet.

Eslava helped Can Vidalet to achieve promotion to Primera Catalana in his first season, and remained a starter afterwards. In July 2019, he joined Tercera División side UE Vilassar de Mar.

On 23 June 2021, Eslava was announced at UE Castelldefels in Tercera División RFEF. On 13 June 2023, after scoring 13 goals for the side, he moved to Segunda Federación side CE Europa.

On 16 June 2024, Eslava signed a one-year deal with Primera Federación side Mérida AD.
