= Iker Almena =

Spanish footballer

Personal information
- Full name: Iker Almena Horcajo
- Date of birth: 4 May 2004 (age 22)
- Place of birth: L'Hospitalet de Llobregat, Spain
- Height: 1.78 m (5 ft 10 in)
- Position: Winger

Team information
- Current team: Dinamo Zagreb (on loan from Al Qadsiah)
- Number: 23

Youth career
- Can Vidalet
- 2011–2017: Barcelona
- 2017–2019: Cornellà
- 2019–2020: Gavà
- 2020: Académica
- 2020–2022: Can Vidalet
- 2022–2023: Girona

Senior career*
Years	Team	Apps	(Gls)
2021–2022	Can Vidalet	24	(1)
2022–2024	Girona B	37	(6)
2023–2024	Girona	2	(0)
2024–	Al Qadsiah	17	(0)
2025–2026	→ Hajduk Split (loan)	21	(3)
2026–	→ Dinamo Zagreb (loan)	5	(0)
- * Club domestic league appearances and goals as of 27 October 2026

Iker Almena Horcajo (born 4 May 2004) is a Spanish professional footballer who plays as a right back or right winger for Dinamo Zagreb, on loan from Saudi Pro League club Al Qadsiah FC.

== Career ==
Born in L'Hospitalet de Llobregat, Barcelona, Catalonia, Almena began his career with CF Can Vidalet before joining FC Barcelona's La Masia in 2011, aged seven. After leaving the club in 2017, he subsequently represented UE Cornellà and CF Gavà's youth sides EF Gavà before moving to Portuguese side Académica de Coimbra in 2020; however, due to the COVID-19 pandemic, he returned to his first club Can Vidalet.

Initially a member of the Juvenil squad, Almena made his senior on 16 May 2021, playing the last 20 minutes in a 2–2 Primera Catalana home draw against CFJ Mollerussa, and scored his first goal seven days later in a 4–0 away routing of FC Alcarràs. In 2022, after another campaign alternating between the Juvenil and the first teams, he moved to Girona FC and returned to youth football.

On 4 September 2023, after already making his debut with the reserves and featuring with the main squad in the pre-season, Almena renewed his contract with the Blanquivermells until 2026. He made his first team debut on 7 December, starting in a 5–2 away win over Orihuela CF, for the season's Copa del Rey.

After impressing in the 2024 pre-season, Almena made his La Liga debut on 15 August of that year; after coming on as a second-half substitute for Portu, he assisted Gabriel Misehouy's equalizer in a 1–1 away draw against Real Betis.

Almena was transferred to Al Qadsiah FC on 30 August 2024.

== Career statistics ==
As of match played 27 October 2026

Appearances and goals by club, season and competition
Club	Season	League			Cup		Europe		Other		Total	
Club	Season	Division	Apps	Goals	Apps	Goals	Apps	Goals	Apps	Goals	Apps	Goals
Can Vidalet	2021–22	Primera Catalana	11	1	—		—		—		11	1
Can Vidalet	2022–23	Primera Catalana	13	0	—		—		—		13	0
Can Vidalet	Total		24	1	—		—		—		24	1
Girona B	2022–23	Tercera Federación	7	0	—		—		—		7	0
Girona B	2023–24	Tercera Federación	30	6	—		—		—		30	6
Girona B	Total		37	6	—		—		—		37	6
Girona	2023–24	La Liga	0	0	1	0	—		—		1	0
Girona	2024–25	La Liga	2	0	0	0	0	0	—		2	0
Girona	Total		2	0	1	0	0	0	0	0	3	0
Al Qadsiah	2024–25	Saudi Pro League	17	0	5	0	—		—		22	0
Hajduk Split (loan)	2025–26	Croatian Football League	21	3	2	1	—		—		23	4
Dinamo Zagreb (loan)	2026–27	Croatian Football League	5	0	2	1	3 (Note: Appearances in UEFA Europa League)	0	—		10	1
Career total			106	10	10	2	3	0	0	0	119	12
