= Jurilj =

Jurilj is a surname. Notable people with the surname include:

- Alen Jurilj (born 1996), Bosnian footballer
- Mirko Jurilj (born 1973), Australian soccer player
