= Andrei Bezhonov =

Russian footballer

Personal information
- Full name: Andrei Nikolayevich Bezhonov
- Date of birth: 6 April 1993 (age 33)
- Place of birth: Moscow, Russia
- Height: 1.78 m (5 ft 10 in)
- Position: Midfielder

Youth career
- 2004–2010: Timiryazevets Moscow
- 2011–2012: Nizhny Novgorod Football Academy

Senior career*
Years	Team	Apps	(Gls)
2011	Nizhny Novgorod-3-Knyaginino		
2011	Nizhny Novgorod-2		
2012	Khimik Koryazhma		
2013	Ilūkste	17	(0)
2014	Shakhtyor Soligorsk	0	(0)
2015	Trudovye Rezervy Moscow		
2016–2017	Dynamo Bryansk	14	(0)
2017	Anzhi-Yunior Zelenodolsk	13	(0)
2018	Can Vidalet		
2018	Torrevieja		
2019	Inkomsport Yalta	9	(0)
2020	Belshina Bobruisk	8	(0)
2020	Sputnik Rechitsa	7	(1)
- * Club domestic league appearances and goals

Andrei Nikolayevich Bezhonov (Russian: Андрей Николаевич Бежонов; born 6 April 1993) is a Russian former football player.

== Club career ==
He made his debut in the Russian Professional Football League for FC Dynamo Bryansk on 25 August 2016 in a game against FC Arsenal-2 Tula.

In 2018 he played in Spanish lower leagues for CF Can Vidalet and CD Torrevieja.
