= Hugo San =

Spanish footballer (born 2005)

Personal information
- Full name: Hugo San Modesto Valdespino
- Date of birth: 24 October 2005 (age 21)
- Place of birth: Valladolid, Spain
- Height: 1.73 m (5 ft 8 in)
- Position: Left-back

Team information
- Current team: Ibiza

Youth career
- Boecillo
- Laguna de Valladolid
- 2016–2024: Valladolid

Senior career*
Years	Team	Apps	(Gls)
2024–2026	Valladolid B	43	(2)
2025–2026	Valladolid	9	(0)
2026–	Ibiza	0	(0)
- * Club domestic league appearances and goals as of 31 May 2026

Hugo San Modesto Valdespino (born 24 October 2005), known as Hugo San, is a Spanish footballer who plays as a left-back for UD Ibiza.

== Career ==
Born in Valladolid, Castile and León San joined Real Valladolid's youth sides in 2016, from CD Laguna de Valladolid. He made his senior debut with the reserves on 1 September 2024, starting in a 1–0 Segunda Federación away loss to Pontevedra CF.

San scored his first senior goal on 9 March 2025, netting the B's second in a 2–0 home win over Coruxo FC, and renewed his contract with the Pucela until 2027 on 2 April. He made his first team debut on 29 October, starting a 1–0 away loss to Club Portugalete, for the season's Copa del Rey.

San made his professional debut on 3 January 2026, coming on as a first-half substitute for injured Guille Bueno in a 1–1 home draw against Racing de Santander. On 30 July, he moved to Primera Federación side UD Ibiza on a two-year deal.
