= Josip Skoko =

Australian soccer player (born 1975)

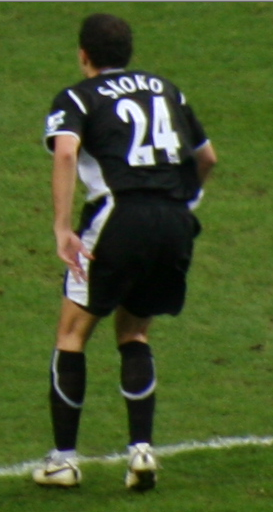
- Skoko in 2007

Personal information
- Full name: Josip Skoko
- Date of birth: 10 December 1975 (age 50)
- Place of birth: Mount Gambier, Australia
- Height: 1.80 m (5 ft 11 in)
- Position: Central midfielder

Youth career
- 1991: North Geelong Warriors
- 1992–1993: AIS

Senior career*
Years	Team	Apps	(Gls)
1994–1995	North Geelong Warriors	32	(8)
1995–1999	Hajduk Split	97	(20)
1999–2003	Genk	100	(8)
2003–2005	Gençlerbirliği	58	(4)
2005–2008	Wigan Athletic	45	(0)
2006	→ Stoke City (loan)	9	(2)
2008–2010	Hajduk Split	52	(1)
2010–2011	Melbourne Heart	22	(0)
Total		415	(43)

International career
1993–1995	Australia U20	11	(3)
2000	Australia Olympic (O.P.)	3	(0)
1997–2007	Australia	51	(9)

Managerial career
- North Geelong Warriors (youth)
Medal record
Representing Australia
Men's Association football
OFC Nations Cup
Winner	2004 Australia
FIFA Confederations Cup
Runner-up	1997 Saudi Arabia
Third place	2001 South Korea-Japan
OFC U-20 Championship
Winner	1994 Fiji
- * Club domestic league appearances and goals

Josip Skoko (Croatian: [jǒsip skôko]; born 10 December 1975) is an Australian former professional soccer player who played as a central midfielder for North Geelong Warriors, Hajduk Split, Genk, Gençlerbirliği, Wigan Athletic, Stoke City and Melbourne Heart. Skoko has been described as a central midfielder with "superb on-ball ability, inch perfect passing, and his ability to turn defence to attack in an instant." Skoko is currently the Director of Football at North Geelong Warriors FC.

== Club career ==
=== Early career ===
Skoko was born in Mount Gambier, to a Croatian family. He played for Mt Gambier Croatia until he was 9 years old when he and his family moved to Geelong. Skoko played for North Geelong Warriors before moving to Croatian side Hajduk Split in 1995. After four years at Stadion Poljud he signed for Belgium club Genk. At Genk he was made captain and helped the team win the title in 2001–02. He joined Turkish club Gençlerbirliği in 2003 where he spent two years before moving to English football.

=== Wigan Athletic ===
Skoko joined Premier League club Wigan Athletic for €1 million at the beginning of the 2005–06 season, although he initially failed to maintain a regular place in the first team. On 7 January 2006, Skoko signed for Football League Championship side Stoke City on loan until the end of the 2005–06 season. He played nine times for Stoke and scored twice against Sheffield United and Crystal Palace.

In the 2006–07 season, Paul Jewell showed renewed faith in Skoko giving him an extended run in the side. The transfers of Jimmy Bullard and Graham Kavanagh to Fulham and Sunderland, respectively, in the summer of 2006 left a gap in Wigan's midfield and this led to him becoming a mainstay in the Wigan Athletic midfield, partnering Paul Scharner and Denny Landzaat. He signed a new contract deal keeping him at Wigan until 2008. However, at the end of the season it became clear that Skoko had played his last game for the club. The two main reasons were because he did not play enough games for Wigan to trigger a clause in his contract and also the impossibility of receiving a visa for his stay in England due to his international retirement with Australia. It was decided in May 2008 that Skoko's contract would not be renewed and he was subsequently released by Wigan.

=== Hajduk Split ===
Due to various work permit issues when playing in Europe, it took a longer than expected time for Skoko to put pen to paper with a club of his choice. However, on 21 July, and after several weeks of speculation, Skoko had finally signed a two-year deal with former club Hajduk. The decision, he said, took only minutes for the club and himself to agree terms. Skoko is relishing the chance to return to the side he made more than 100 appearances for between 1995 and 1999, with a club he describes as "a second home".

=== Melbourne Heart ===
Skoko's return home to Australia to play for A-League newcomers Melbourne Heart was confirmed by the club on 19 May 2010. The club signed the former Socceroo for one season as their inaugural Australian marquee player. He was also named as one of the initial members of the leadership group. In his second game for Melbourne Heart, he suffered a hamstring injury, which forced him out of the side for at least one month. In February 2012, Skoko came out of retirement to take part in the 2012 Hawaiian Island Invitational before retiring for good.

== International career ==
Skoko was a member of the Australia senior team for ten years, from 1997 to 2007. He made his debut for Australia against Macedonia in 1997 and was a mainstay of the Socceroos side from then on, participating in two World Cup qualifying campaigns. He also represented his country at the Olympics in 2000.

In November 2005, Skoko came on as a substitute in Australia's playoff victory over Uruguay to qualify for the 2006 FIFA World Cup. He also captained a weakened Australian side against Bahrain in an Asian Cup qualifier in 2006.

On 25 May 2006, Skoko scored a cracking volley from 25m for Australia in a 1–0 friendly victory over Greece in front of 95,103 spectators at the Melbourne Cricket Ground, which he regards as "the most legendary moment of all time". He was selected in the squad for the 2006 World Cup in Germany but did not play in any of Australia's four games.

After being named in the Australian side for a friendly match against Argentina on 11 September 2007, Skoko stated that the game would be his home farewell from international football. Skoko ended his international career 51 minutes into the match in Melbourne when he was replaced by midfielder Carl Valeri.

== Personal life ==
Josip's sons Noa and Luka Skoko are also professional footballers.

== Career statistics ==
=== Club ===
Appearances and goals by club, season and competition
Club	Season	League			National cup		League cup		Total	
Club	Season	Division	Apps	Goals	Apps	Goals	Apps	Goals	Apps	Goals
North Geelong Warriors	1993	Victoria Premier League	22	6	—		—		22	6
North Geelong Warriors	1994	Victoria Premier League	10	2	—		—		10	2
North Geelong Warriors	Total		32	8	—		—		32	8
Hajduk Split	1995–96	1. HNL	14	1	—		—		14	1
Hajduk Split	1996–97	1. HNL	27	10	—		—		27	10
Hajduk Split	1997–98	1. HNL	26	5	—		—		26	5
Hajduk Split	1998–99	1. HNL	24	3	—		—		24	3
Hajduk Split	1999–2000	1. HNL	6	1	—		—		6	1
Hajduk Split	Total		97	20	—		—		97	20
Genk	1999–2000	Belgian First Division	9	1	—		—		9	1
Genk	2000–01	Belgian First Division	29	3	—		—		29	3
Genk	2001–02	Belgian First Division	32	2	—		—		32	2
Genk	2002–03	Belgian First Division	30	2	—		—		30	2
Genk	Total		100	8	—		—		100	8
Gençlerbirliği	2003–04	Süper Lig	28	2	—		—		28	2
Gençlerbirliği	2004–05	Süper Lig	30	2	—		—		30	2
Gençlerbirliği	Total		58	4	—		—		58	4
Wigan Athletic	2005–06	Premier League	5	0	3	0	3	0	11	0
Wigan Athletic	2006–07	Premier League	28	0	0	0	0	0	28	0
Wigan Athletic	2007–08	Premier League	12	0	1	0	1	0	14	0
Wigan Athletic	Total		45	0	4	0	4	0	53	0
Stoke City (loan)	2005–06	Championship	9	2	0	0	0	0	9	2
Hajduk Split	2008–09	1. HNL	29	0	—		—		29	0
Hajduk Split	2009–10	1. HNL	23	1	—		—		23	1
Hajduk Split	Total		52	1	—		—		52	1
Melbourne Heart	2010–11	A-League	22	0	—		—		22	0
Career total			415	43	4	0	4	0	423	43

=== International ===
Appearances and goals by national team and year
National team	Year	Apps	Goals
Australia	1997	6	0
Australia	1998	2	0
Australia	1999	0	0
Australia	2000	7	1
Australia	2001	8	1
Australia	2002	0	0
Australia	2003	2	0
Australia	2004	10	4
Australia	2005	8	1
Australia	2006	6	2
Australia	2007	2	0
Total		51	9

Scores and results list Australia's goal tally first, score column indicates score after each Skoko goal.

List of international goals scored by Josip Skoko
No.	Date	Venue	Opponent	Score	Result	Competition
1	23 February 2000	Üllői úti stadion, Budapest, Hungary	Hungary	2–0	3–0	Friendly
2	30 May 2001	Suwon World Cup Stadium, Suwon, South Korea	Mexico	2–0	2–0	2001 FIFA Confederations Cup
3	31 May 2004	Hindmarsh Stadium, Adelaide, Australia	Tahiti	2–0	9–0	2004 OFC Nations Cup
4	9 October 2004	Lawson Tama Stadium, Honiara, Solomon Islands	Solomon Islands	1–0	5–1	2004 OFC Nations Cup
5	9 October 2004	Lawson Tama Stadium, Honiara, Solomon Islands	Solomon Islands	3–0	5–1	2004 OFC Nations Cup
6	16 November 2004	Craven Cottage, London, England	Norway	2–1	2–2	Friendly
7	15 June 2005	Waldstadion, Frankfurt, Germany	Germany	1–1	3–4	2005 FIFA Confederations Cup
8	22 February 2006	Bahrain National Stadium, Manama, Bahrain	Bahrain	2–1	3–1	2007 AFC Asian Cup qualification
9	25 May 2006	Melbourne Cricket Ground, Melbourne, Australia	Greece	1–0	1–0	Friendly

== Honours ==
Genk

- Belgian First Division: 2001–02
- Belgian Cup: 1999–2000

Australia

- OFC Nations Cup: 2004
- FIFA Confederations Cup: runner-up 1997; third place 2001

Australia U-20

- OFC U-20 Championship: 1994
