= Branimir Mlačić =

Croatian footballer

Personal information
- Date of birth: 12 March 2007 (age 19)
- Place of birth: Split, Croatia
- Height: 1.92 m (6 ft 4 in)
- Position: Centre-back

Team information
- Current team: Watford (on loan from Udinese)
- Number: 29

Youth career
- 2016–2018: Trogir 1912
- 2018–2025: Hajduk Split

Senior career*
Years	Team	Apps	(Gls)
2025–2026	Hajduk Split	15	(0)
2026–	Udinese	7	(0)
2026–	→ Watford (loan)	3	(0)

International career^{‡}
2024	Croatia U18	4	(0)
2025–	Croatia U19	2	(0)
2025–	Croatia U21	1	(0)
- * Club domestic league appearances and goals as of 14 October 2026 ‡ National team caps and goals as of 13 November 2025

Branimir Mlačić (born 12 March 2007) is a Croatian professional footballer who plays as a centre-back for EFL Championship club Watford, on loan from Serie A club Udinese.

== Club career ==
Mlačić joined the Hajduk Split youth system in 2018. He made his debut for the senior team on 31 July 2025, in the club's UEFA Conference League 2–1 away win against Zira FK, aged 18, following Marino Skelin's injury. Mlačić made his league debut on 3 August 2025 against Istra 1961.

On 2 February 2026, Mlačić signed a five-and-a-half-year contract with Serie A club Udinese.

== International career ==
Mlačić made his debut for Croatia national under-18 team on 4 September 2024 in a friendly match against Poland, followed by his debut for the Under-19 team on 22 March 2025. In late September 2025, Mlačić was called up to the Croatia national under-21 team for the first time.
