= Luka Skoko =

Croatian footballer (born 2003)

Personal information
- Full name: Luka Ivan Skoko
- Date of birth: 22 January 2003 (age 23)
- Place of birth: Split, Croatia
- Position: Central midfielder

Team information
- Current team: N.K. Hrvace

Youth career
- -2022: North Geelong Warriors
- 2022: NK Dugopolje

Senior career*
Years	Team	Apps	(Gls)
2022-	NK Solin	0	(0)
2023	→ NK Urania Baška Voda (loan)		
2024	NK Croatia Zmijavci	5	(0)
2024-	NK Hrvace	3	(0)
- * Club domestic league appearances and goals as of 00:15, 28 December 2025 (UTC)

Luka Skoko (born 22 January 2003) is a Croatian professional footballer who plays as a central midfielder for NK Hrvace. He is the son of Australian former international Josip Skoko, and brother of Croatian youth international Noa Skoko.

== Career ==
Skoko played for the Elcho Park Cardinals, before joining North Geelong's NPL youth program. He played for North Geelong Warriors in the NPL2, and was awarded the senior team's best player award in 2021. Following a trial, he joined up with Croatian side NK Dugopolje in February 2022.

In July 2022, Skoko joined up with NK Solin, who play near Split, in the Croatian second division 1. NL. In October 2022, be played in the fourth tier of Croatian football for NK Urania Baška Voda. He signed with Croatia Zmijavci in 2024. In August 2024, he joined NK Hrvace.

== Style of play ==
A central midfielder, he is said to be capable of playing in a deep defensive midfield position as well as an "8".

== Personal life ==
He is the son of Australian former international footballer Josip Skoko and brother of Croatian youth international footballer Noa Skoko.
