= UD Ibiza =

Coordinates: 38.913794°N 1.414987°E

Ibiza
- Full name: Unión Deportiva Ibiza, S.A.D.
- Nicknames: L'Eivissa; Ibiza; Celestes; UD
- Founded: 31 July 2015; 11 years ago
- Stadium: Can Misses
- Capacity: 6,000
- Owner: Amadeo Salvo
- President: Amadeo Salvo
- Head coach: Raúl Llona
- League: Primera Federación – Group 2
- 2025–26: Primera Federación – Group 2, 12th of 20
- Website: www.ibizaud.com
Home colours	Away colours

Unión Deportiva Ibiza, S.A.D. is a Spanish professional football club based in the town of Ibiza, in the autonomous community of the Balearic Islands. Founded in 2015, it plays in Primera Federación – Group 2, holding home matches at Estadi Municipal de Can Misses, with a capacity of 6,000.

== History ==
UD Ibiza was founded in 2015 by former Valencia CF president Amadeo Salvo, as a revival of UD Ibiza-Eivissa which had folded five years earlier. The new organisation was allowed to use the old one's identity, by settling its €50,000 debt with the Royal Spanish Football Federation and the regional federation in the Balearic Islands. In June 2017, the club was promoted to Tercera División after spending two seasons in the Regional league.

On 7 August 2018, after the RFEF blocked Lorca FC's participation in Segunda División B, Ibiza paid the club's debts and achieved an administrative promotion to the third level.

In 2019–20, the club competed in the Copa del Rey for the first time. They defeated Pontevedra and Albacete Balompié before a 1–2 home loss to FC Barcelona in the round of 32, having led the league title holders with 20 minutes to play. In the following edition, UD Ibiza beat a top-flight team for the first time, winning 5–2 against Celta Vigo in the second round of the competition; later they lost 2–1 to Athletic Bilbao after extra time.

On 23 May 2021, Ibiza was promoted for the first time ever to Segunda División by defeating UCAM Murcia in the final of the promotion play-off, via an Ekain Zenitagoia goal from the penalty spot. To compete in the Liga Nacional de Fútbol Profesional, the club became a Sociedad Anónima Deportiva with a starting capital of €700,000. Manager Juan Carlos Carcedo, who led the team to promotion, was dismissed on 18 December following six games without a win; his replacement Paco Jémez saved the team from relegation with a 15th-place finish, which was not enough for Salvo to give him a new contract.

On 28 April 2023, Ibiza were relegated to Primera Federación after being defeated 1–0 at Racing Santander, ending their two-season spell in the second division.

== Season to season ==
Season	Tier	Division	Place	Copa del Rey
2015–16	5	Reg. Pref.	4th	
2016–17	5	Reg. Pref.	1st	
2017–18	4	3ª	3rd	
2018–19	3	2ª B	6th	
2019–20	3	2ª B	2nd	Round of 32
2020–21	3	2ª B	1st	Round of 32
2021–22	2	2ª	15th	Second round
2022–23	2	2ª	21st	Second round
2023–24	3	1ª Fed.	4th	First round
2024–25	3	1ª Fed.	3rd	First round
2025–26	3	1ª Fed.	12th	First round
2026–27	3	1ª Fed.		

- 2 seasons in Segunda División
- 4 seasons in Primera Federación
- 3 seasons in Segunda División B
- 1 season in Tercera División
- 2 seasons in Categorías Regionales

== Players ==
=== First team squad ===
As of 4 November 2026.

Note: Flags indicate national team as defined under FIFA eligibility rules; some limited exceptions apply. Players may hold more than one non-FIFA nationality.

No.	Pos.	Nation	Player
1	GK	ESP	Andrés Prieto
2	DF	ESP	Pablo Busto
3	DF	ESP	Víctor García
4	DF	FRA	Jérémy Blasco (on loan from Radomiak Radom)
5	DF	MAR	Ismael Fadel (on loan from Castellón)
6	MF	ESP	Josep Calavera (on loan from Tenerife)
7	FW	ESP	Javi Eslava
8	MF	ESP	Iván del Olmo
9	FW	ESP	Manu Justo
10	FW	ESP	Ander Yoldi
11	FW	ESP	Georges Nsukula
13	GK	GRE	Dimitrios Stamatakis (on loan from Osasuna)

No.	Pos.	Nation	Player
15	DF	ESP	Eric Curbelo
16	MF	ESP	Genaro Rodríguez
17	MF	FRA	Théo Valls
18	DF	ESP	David Astals
19	FW	ESP	Iker Varela
20	MF	ESP	Pedro Ortiz
21	FW	ESP	José Carlos Lazo
22	DF	ESP	Hugo San
23	DF	ESP	Gonzalo Almenara
24	DF	ESP	Erik Ruiz
31	GK	ROU	Rareș Vlad

=== Reserve team ===
Note: Flags indicate national team as defined under FIFA eligibility rules; some limited exceptions apply. Players may hold more than one non-FIFA nationality.

No.	Pos.	Nation	Player
26	MF	ESP	Agustín Gorla
27	DF	ITA	Paolo Pugliese

=== Out on loan ===
Note: Flags indicate national team as defined under FIFA eligibility rules; some limited exceptions apply. Players may hold more than one non-FIFA nationality.

No.	Pos.	Nation	Player
—	GK	FRA	Tao Paradowski (at Algeciras until 30 June 2027)

== Managers ==
=== Current technical staff ===
Position	Staff
Head coach	(Spain) Miguel Álvarez
Assistant coach	(Spain) Javier Prats
Fitness coach	(Spain) Moisés Falces
Goalkeeping coach	(Spain) Francisco Torres

Last updated: 17 Jan 2026
Source: UD Ibiza

=== Managerial history ===
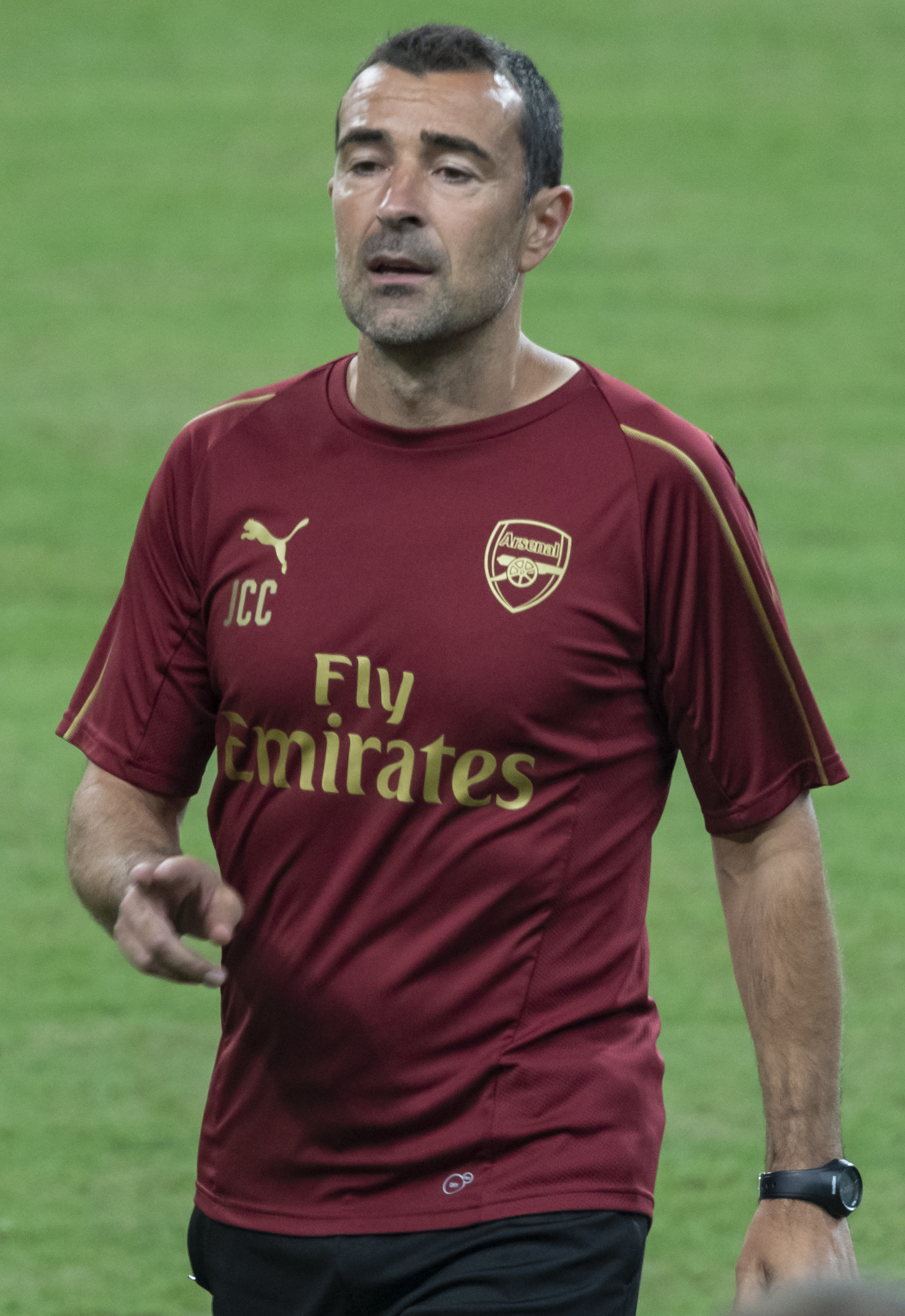
Juan Carlos Carcedo won Ibiza's first promotion to Segunda División in 2021

- (Spain) Buti (2015–2017)
- (Spain) José López Bargues (2017)
- (Spain) David Porras (2017)
- (Spain) Manuel Benavente (2017)
- (Spain) Toni Amor (2017–2018)
- (Spain) Francisco Rufete (2018)
- (Spain) Antonio Méndez (2018)
- (Spain) Andrés Palop (2018–2019)
- (Spain) Pablo Alfaro (2019–2020)
- (Spain) Juan Carlos Carcedo (2020–2021)
- (Spain) Paco Jémez (2022)
- (Spain) Javier Baraja (2022)
- (Spain) Juan Antonio Anquela (2022)
- (Spain) Carlos Sánchez (2022)
- (Spain) Lucas Alcaraz (2022–2023)
- (Spain) Guillermo Fernández Romo (2023–2024)
- (Spain) Onésimo Sánchez (2024)
- (Spain) José Luis Martí (2024)
- (Spain) Paco Jémez (2024–2025)
- (Spain) Miguel Álvarez (2025-)
