= Noa Skoko =

Croatian footballer (born 2006)

Personal information
- Date of birth: 12 January 2006 (age 20)
- Place of birth: Wythenshawe, England
- Height: 1.75 m (5 ft 9 in)
- Position: Central midfielder

Team information
- Current team: Rudeš (on loan from Hajduk Split)
- Number: 15

Youth career
- –2022: North Geelong Warriors
- 2022–: Hajduk Split

Senior career*
Years	Team	Apps	(Gls)
2022	North Geelong Warriors	15	(1)
2024–	Hajduk Split	13	(0)
2025–2026	→ Uskok Klis (loan)	10	(3)
2026–	→ Rudeš (loan)	9	(3)

International career
2022–2023	Croatia U17	17	(2)
2024	Croatia U18	3	(1)
2024–2025	Croatia U19	10	(0)
2025	Croatia U20	1	(0)
- * Club domestic league appearances and goals as of 9 August 2026

Noa Skoko (born 12 January 2006) is a professional footballer who plays as a central midfielder for Croatian Football League club Rudeš, on loan from Hajduk Split. Born in England and raised in Australia, he represents Croatia at youth level.

== Club career ==
Skoko joined the North Geelong Warriors and broke into their first team, playing in NPL 2 at the age of 16, prior to the outbreak of the coronavirus pandemic which cancelled the league season. He subsequently scored his first senior goal on June 4, 2022, against Northcote City FC. before joining the Hajduk Split academy in Croatia that summer. He was a member of the Hajduk Split team that reached the final of the 2022–23 UEFA Youth League, beating a high calibre of youth team clubs, such as Manchester City and AC Milan, as well as Borussia Dortmund, against whom Skoko scored in a penalty shoot-out that went to 9–8 in his club's favour. On 11 October 2023, Skoko was named by English newspaper The Guardian as one of the best players born in 2006 worldwide.

Skoko made his senior club debut for Hajduk Split on 27 April 2024 in a game against Rudeš.

== International career ==
Skoko is a Croatia youth international, for whom he played his first tournament at the 2023 UEFA European Under-17 Championship.

He featured for the Croatia national under-19 team against England on 7 September 2024.

== Style of play ==
He is described as a box-to-box central midfielder, similar in profile to his father, Josip Skoko.

== Personal life ==
Born in Wythenshawe, England, Skoko is brother of footballer Luka Skoko and the son of Josip Skoko, an Australian former professional footballer of Croatian descent. He was educated in Australia at St. Joseph's College, Geelong.
