= Marino Skelin =

Croatian footballer

Personal information
- Date of birth: 18 September 2006 (age 20)
- Place of birth: Split, Croatia
- Height: 1.90 m (6 ft 3 in)
- Position: Centre-back

Team information
- Current team: Hajduk Split
- Number: 36

Youth career
- 2013–2014: Spinut Split
- 2014–2024: Hajduk Split

Senior career*
Years	Team	Apps	(Gls)
2024–	Hajduk Split	6	(0)

International career^{‡}
2022–2023	Croatia U17	15	(1)
2025–	Croatia U20	1	(0)
- * Club domestic league appearances and goals as of 15 June 2026 ‡ National team caps and goals as of 6 October 2025

Marino Skelin (born 18 September 2006) is a Croatian professional footballer who plays as a centre-back for Croatian Football League club Hajduk Split.

== Club career ==
Skelin joined the Hajduk Split youth system in 2014. He made his league debut for the senior team on 18 April 2025, aged 18, coming in for Šimun Hrgović in extra time of the 1–1 draw against NK Varaždin, starting for the first time in the first 11 on 18 May 2025 in the 2–1 win against HNK Rijeka, due to the absences of Dominik Prpić and Filip Uremović. He made his European debut on 23 July 2025 in the club's UEFA Conference League 1–1 home draw against Zira FK, aged 18.

== International career ==
Skelin made his debut for Croatia national under-17 team on 22 August 2022, in a friendly match against Turkey, featuring in 15 matches in the age bracket in the following year, scoring 1 goal. In May 2025, he was called up to the Under-20 team, featuring in a single match against Qatar.
