= Alen Jurilj =

Bosnian footballer (born 1996)

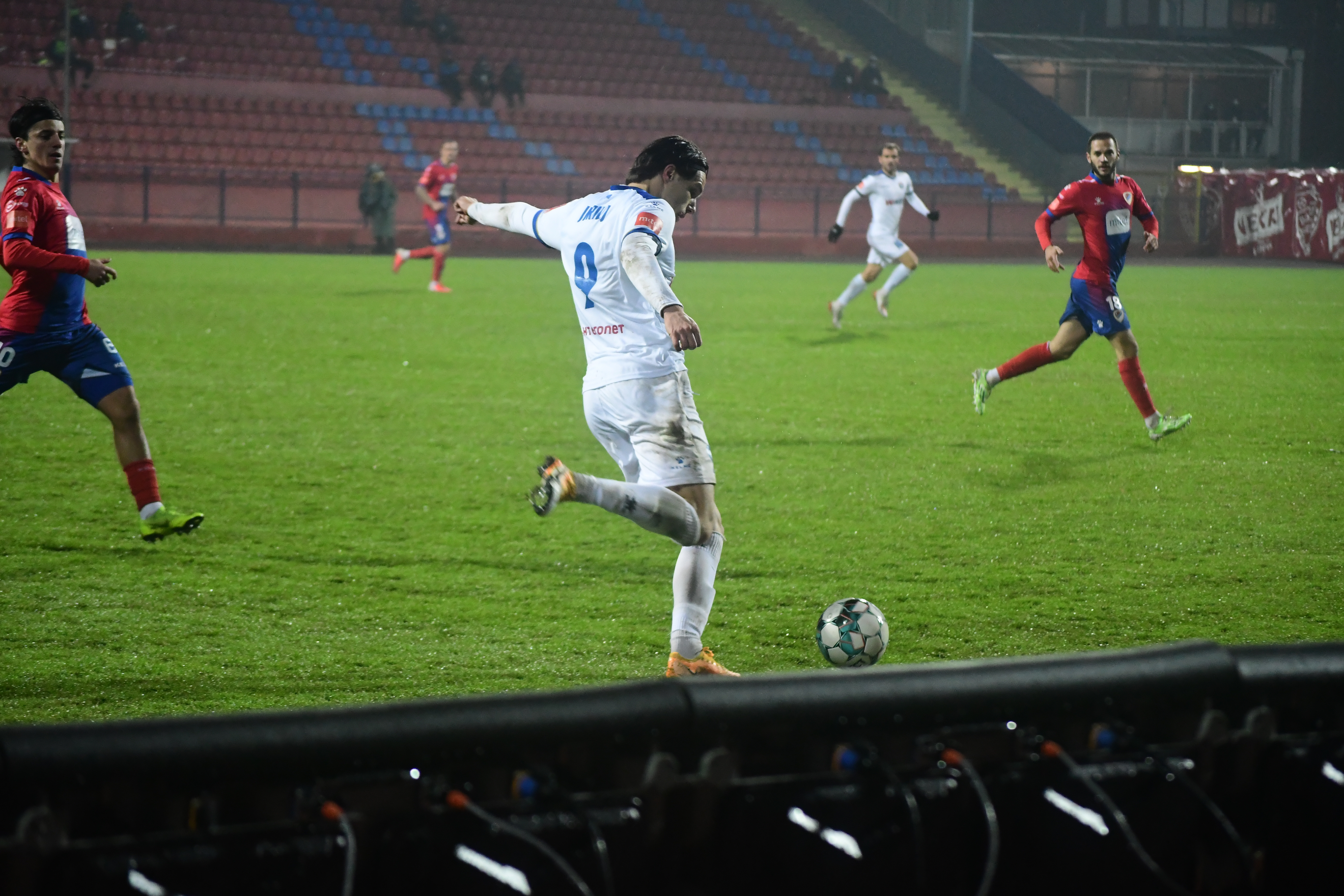
- Jurilj with Široki Brijeg in 2021

Personal information
- Date of birth: 7 March 1996 (age 30)
- Place of birth: Zagreb, Croatia
- Height: 1.87 m (6 ft 2 in)
- Position: Left winger

Team information
- Current team: Vukovar 1991
- Number: 19

Youth career
- 2004–2013: Dinamo Zagreb
- 2013–2014: Zagreb

Senior career*
Years	Team	Apps	(Gls)
2014–2017	Zagreb	52	(8)
2017–2019	Dinamo Zagreb	0	(0)
2017	Dinamo Zagreb II	7	(1)
2019	→ Kustošija (loan)	1	(0)
2019–2021	Široki Brijeg	54	(8)
2021–2022	Domžale	25	(0)
2022–2024	Borac Banja Luka	44	(5)
2024–2025	Zrinjski Mostar	14	(0)
2025–	Vukovar 1991	20	(2)

International career
2015	Bosnia and Herzegovina U19	3	(0)
- * Club domestic league appearances and goals as of 15 June 2026

Alen Jurilj (born 7 March 1996) is a Bosnian professional footballer who plays as a left winger for Croatian Football League club Vukovar 1991. Born in Croatia, he represented Bosnia and Herzegovina internationally.

== Honours ==
Dinamo Zagreb

- Croatian First League: 2017–18
- Croatian Cup: 2017–18

Borac Banja Luka

- Bosnian Premier League: 2023–24
