= CF Can Vidalet =

Association football club in Spain

Can Vidalet
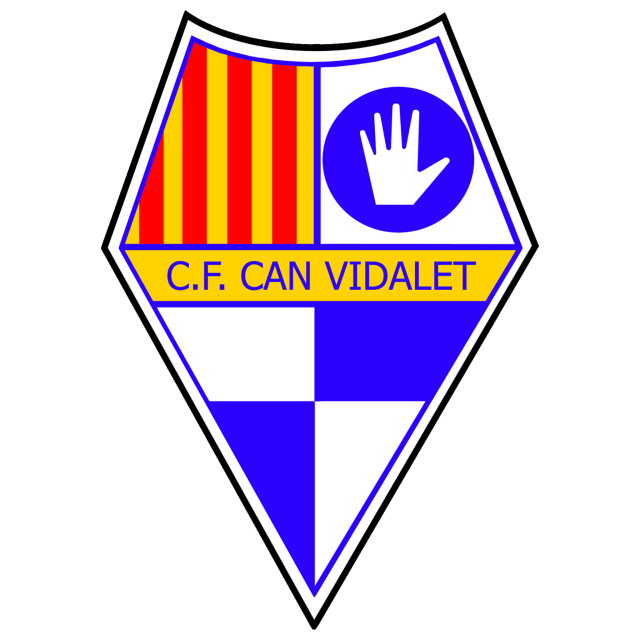
- Full name: Club de Futbol Can Vidalet
- Founded: 1966
- Ground: El Molí, Esplugues de Llobregat, Catalonia, Spain
- Capacity: 1,000
- President: Pedro Rubio
- Manager: Fran Rubio
- League: Tercera Federación – Group 5
- 2024–25: Lliga Elit, 3rd of 16 (promoted via play-offs)
- Website: https://www.cfcanvidalet.com/
Home colours	Away colours

Club de Futbol Can Vidalet is a Spanish football team based in Esplugues de Llobregat, Barcelona, Catalonia. Founded in 1966, they play in the Tercera Federación – Group 5, holding home matches at the Camp Municipal d'Esports El Molí.

== History ==
Founded in 1966, Can Vidalet played in the lower leagues before achieving a promotion to Primera Catalana in 1994. They spent only two seasons in the category before suffering relegation, and only returned to the fifth tier in 2017.

On 22 June 2025, Can Vidalet achieved a first-ever promotion to Tercera Federación, after defeating Atlètic Sant Just FC in the play-offs.

== Season to season ==
Season	Tier	Division	Place	Copa del Rey
1972–73	7	3ª Reg.		
1973–74	7	3ª Reg.	1st	
1974–75	6	2ª Reg.	13th	
1975–76	6	2ª Reg.	7th	
1976–77	6	2ª Reg.	6th	
1977–78	7	2ª Reg.	1st	
1978–79	6	1ª Reg.	10th	
1979–80	6	1ª Reg.	8th	
1980–81	6	1ª Reg.	18th	
1981–82	6	1ª Reg.	12th	
1982–83	6	1ª Reg.	17th	
1983–84	7	2ª Reg.	9th	
1984–85	7	2ª Reg.	1st	
1985–86	6	1ª Reg.	13th	
1986–87	7	2ª Reg.	1st	
1987–88	6	1ª Reg.	3rd	
1988–89	6	1ª Reg.	8th	
1989–90	6	1ª Reg.	7th	
1990–91	6	1ª Reg.	4th	
1991–92	6	Pref. Terr.	9th	

Season	Tier	Division	Place	Copa del Rey
1992–93	6	Pref. Terr.	8th	
1993–94	6	Pref. Terr.	2nd	
1994–95	5	1ª Cat.	15th	
1995–96	5	1ª Cat.	19th	
1996–97	6	Pref. Terr.	7th	
1997–98	6	Pref. Terr.	12th	
1998–99	6	Pref. Terr.	18th	
1999–2000	7	1ª Terr.	11th	
2000–01	7	1ª Terr.	12th	
2001–02	7	1ª Terr.	11th	
2002–03	7	1ª Terr.	16th	
2003–04	8	2ª Terr.	4th	
2004–05	8	2ª Terr.	10th	
2005–06	8	2ª Terr.	10th	
2006–07	8	2ª Terr.	2nd	
2007–08	7	1ª Terr.	18th	
2008–09	8	2ª Terr.	4th	
2009–10	8	2ª Terr.	2nd	
2010–11	8	2ª Terr.	1st	
2011–12	6	2ª Cat.	10th	

Season	Tier	Division	Place	Copa del Rey
2012–13	6	2ª Cat.	3rd	
2013–14	6	2ª Cat.	3rd	
2014–15	6	2ª Cat.	4th	
2015–16	6	2ª Cat.	4th	
2016–17	6	2ª Cat.	1st	
2017–18	5	1ª Cat.	3rd	
2018–19	5	1ª Cat.	10th	
2019–20	5	1ª Cat.	15th	
2020–21	5	1ª Cat.	2nd	
2021–22	6	1ª Cat.	8th	
2022–23	6	1ª Cat.	3rd	
2023–24	6	Lliga Elit	10th	
2024–25	6	Lliga Elit	3rd	
2025–26	5	3ª Fed.		

- 1 season in Tercera Federación
